= 2025 Philippine local elections in Northern Mindanao =

- May 12, 2025
- Gubernatorial elections
- 5 provincial governors and 2 city mayors
Party	Seats	+/–
Lakas	2	+1
Nacionalista	2	0
PFP	2	+2
NUP	1	0
This lists parties that won seats. See the complete results below.
- Vice gubernatorial elections
- 5 provincial vice governors and 2 city vice mayors
Party	Seats	+/–
Lakas	2	New
ASPIN	1	New
BPP	1	0
CDP	1	0
PFP	1	+1
PMP	1	New
This lists parties that won seats. See the complete results below.
- Provincial Board elections
- 48 provincial board members and 28 city councilors
Party	Seats	+/–
PFP	16	+16
Lakas	11	+8
ASPIN	10	+3
BPP	9	0
Nacionalista	9	0
PADAYN	5	−3
UNLAD	4	New
PMP	3	New
NUP	2	−11
PDP–Laban	2	−20
CDP	1	−1
NPC	1	New
Independent	3	+3
This lists parties that won seats. See the complete results below.

The 2025 Philippine local elections in Northern Mindanao were held on May 12, 2025.

== Summary ==
=== Governors ===
Province/city	Incumbent	Incumbent's party	Winner	Winner's party	Winning margin
Bukidnon	Rogelio Neil Roque	PFP	Rogelio Neil Roque	PFP	27.52%
Cagayan de Oro (HUC)	Rolando Uy	PFP	Rolando Uy	PFP	28.12%
Camiguin	Xavier Jesus Romualdo	Lakas	Xavier Jesus Romualdo	Lakas	42.18%
Iligan (HUC)	Frederick Siao	Nacionalista	Frederick Siao	Nacionalista	4.06%
Lanao del Norte	Imelda Dimaporo	PFP	Mohamad Khalid Dimaporo	Lakas	80.56%
Misamis Occidental	Henry Oaminal	Nacionalista	Henry Oaminal	Nacionalista	76.76%
Misamis Oriental	Peter Unabia	Lakas	Juliette Uy	NUP	16.28%

=== Vice governors ===
Province/city	Incumbent	Incumbent's party	Winner	Winner's party	Winning margin
Bukidnon	Clive Quiño	Bukidnon Paglaum	Clive Quiño	Bukidnon Paglaum	31.60%
Cagayan de Oro (HUC)	Jocelyn Rodriguez	CDP	Jocelyn Rodriguez	CDP	61.31%
Camiguin	Rodin Romualdo	PFP	Rodin Romualdo	PFP	41.87%
Iligan (HUC)	Dodong Alemania	Nacionalista	Wekwek Uy	PMP	2.77%
Lanao del Norte	Allan Lim	Lakas	Allan Lim	Lakas	69.42%
Misamis Occidental	Rowena Gutierrez	Asenso Pinoy	Rowena Gutierrez	Asenso Pinoy	76.20%
Misamis Oriental	Jigjag Pelaez	Lakas	Jigjag Pelaez	Lakas	24.82%

=== Provincial boards ===
Province/city	Seats	Party control		Composition
Province/city	Seats	Previous	Result	Composition
Bukidnon	10 elected 3 ex-officio	Bukidnon Paglaum	Bukidnon Paglaum	Bukidnon Paglaum (9); Independent (1)
Cagayan de Oro (HUC)	16 elected 2 ex-officio	No majority	PFP	PFP (10); Padayon Pilipino (2); PDP–Laban (2); CDP (1); NUP (1)
Camiguin	8 elected 3 ex-officio	PDP–Laban	PFP	PFP (6); Independent (2)
Iligan (HUC)	12 elected 2 ex-officio	No majority	Nacionalista	Nacionalista (8); PMP (3); NPC (1)
Lanao del Norte	10 elected 3 ex-officio	PDP–Laban	No majority	Lakas (6); UNLAD (4)
Misamis Occidental	10 elected 3 ex-officio	Asenso Pinoy	Asenso Pinoy	Asenso Pinoy (10)
Misamis Oriental	10 elected 4 ex-officio	No majority	No majority	Lakas (5); Padayon Pilipino (3); NUP (1); Nacionalista (1)

== Bukidnon ==
=== Governor ===
Incumbent Governor Rogelio Neil Roque of the Partido Federal ng Pilipinas ran for a second term. He was previously affiliated with the People's Reform Party.

Roque won re-election against Valencia mayor Azucena Huervas (National Unity Party), Bukidnon indigenous peoples' mandatory representative Arbie Llesis (Independent), Pangantucan mayor Miguel Silva Jr. (Independent), and Bong Eligan (Workers' and Peasants' Party).

Candidate	Party	Votes	%
Rogelio Neil Roque (incumbent)	Partido Federal ng Pilipinas	392,204	53.10
Azucena Huervas	National Unity Party	188,947	25.58
Arbie Llesis	Independent	111,397	15.08
Miguel Silva Jr.	Independent	39,215	5.31
Bong Eligan	Workers' and Peasants' Party	6,909	0.94
Total		738,672	100.00
Valid votes		738,672	85.72
Invalid/blank votes		123,060	14.28
Total votes		861,732	100.00
Registered voters/turnout		995,736	86.54
PFP hold			
Source: Commission on Elections

=== Vice Governor ===
Incumbent Vice Governor Clive Quiño of Bukidnon Paglaum ran for a second term.

Quiño won re-election against Rhea Rhenna Agripo (Independent).

Candidate	Party	Votes	%
Clive Quiño (incumbent)	Bukidnon Paglaum	431,934	65.80
Rhea Rhenna Agripo	Independent	224,481	34.20
Total		656,415	100.00
Valid votes		656,415	76.17
Invalid/blank votes		205,317	23.83
Total votes		861,732	100.00
Registered voters/turnout		995,736	86.54
BPP hold			
Source: Commission on Elections

=== Provincial Board ===
The Bukidnon Provincial Board is composed of 13 board members, 10 of whom are elected.

Bukidnon Paglaum won nine seats, maintaining its majority in the provincial board.

Party	Votes	%	Seats	+/–
Bukidnon Paglaum	903,052	77.80	9	0
PDP–Laban	53,299	4.59	0	New
Workers' and Peasants' Party	7,260	0.63	0	0
Independent	197,170	16.99	1	+1
Total	1,160,781	100.00	10	0
Total votes	861,732	–		
Registered voters/turnout	995,736	86.54		
Source: Commission on Elections

==== 1st district ====
Bukidnon's 1st provincial district consists of the same area as Bukidnon's 1st legislative district. Two board members are elected from this provincial district.

Four candidates were included in the ballot.

Candidate	Party	Votes	%
Jong Albarece (incumbent)	Bukidnon Paglaum	93,235	44.45
Eliezer Onahon	Bukidnon Paglaum	71,831	34.24
Mario Cedeño	Independent	37,446	17.85
Riche Omaña	Workers' and Peasants' Party	7,260	3.46
Total		209,772	100.00
Total votes		195,955	–
Registered voters/turnout		217,275	90.19
Source: Commission on Elections

==== 2nd district ====
Bukidnon's 2nd provincial district consists of the same area as Bukidnon's 2nd legislative district. Three board members are elected from this provincial district.

Eight candidates were included in the ballot.

Candidate	Party	Votes	%
Marlon Dinlayan	Bukidnon Paglaum	105,162	25.59
Hollis Monsanto (incumbent)	Bukidnon Paglaum	81,414	19.81
Bobby Jay Dinlayan	Independent	77,226	18.79
Rolex Beltran	Bukidnon Paglaum	64,699	15.74
Richard Macas	Independent	52,435	12.76
Ali Dan Dumalahay	Independent	11,515	2.80
Rodolfo Laviña Jr.	Independent	10,959	2.67
Deryl Aranggo	Independent	7,589	1.85
Total		410,999	100.00
Total votes		227,102	–
Registered voters/turnout		267,163	85.01
Source: Commission on Elections

==== 3rd district ====
Bukidnon's 3rd provincial district consists of the same area as Bukidnon's 3rd legislative district. Three board members are elected from this provincial district.

Three candidates were included in the ballot.

Candidate	Party	Votes	%
Bing-bing Casinabe (incumbent)	Bukidnon Paglaum	127,589	37.23
Joseph Palmada (incumbent)	Bukidnon Paglaum	115,870	33.81
Jomic Fortich	Bukidnon Paglaum	99,269	28.96
Total		342,728	100.00
Total votes		265,176	–
Registered voters/turnout		311,057	85.25
Source: Commission on Elections

==== 4th district ====
Bukidnon's 4th provincial district consists of the same area as Bukidnon's 4th legislative district. Two board members are elected from this provincial district.

Three candidates were included in the ballot.

Candidate	Party	Votes	%
RJ Pepito (incumbent)	Bukidnon Paglaum	78,877	39.98
Babba Garcia	Bukidnon Paglaum	65,106	33.00
RJ Dangallo	PDP–Laban	53,299	27.02
Total		197,282	100.00
Total votes		173,499	–
Registered voters/turnout		200,241	86.65
Source: Commission on Elections

== Cagayan de Oro ==
=== Mayor ===
Incumbent Mayor Rolando Uy of the Partido Federal ng Pilipinas ran for a second term. He was previously affiliated with the National Unity Party.

Uy won re-election against Phividec Industrial Authority administrator Pompee La Viña (Independent), former Cagayan de Oro mayor Oscar Moreno (National Unity Party), Barangay Puntod councilor Bingky Beja (Independent), and two other candidates.

Candidate	Party	Votes	%
Rolando Uy (incumbent)	Partido Federal ng Pilipinas	175,686	52.57
Pompee La Viña	Independent	81,726	24.45
Oscar Moreno	National Unity Party	73,842	22.10
Bingky Beja	Independent	1,386	0.41
Vic Flores	Independent	1,107	0.33
Romer Cabildo	Independent	451	0.13
Total		334,198	100.00
Valid votes		334,198	95.16
Invalid/blank votes		16,997	4.84
Total votes		351,195	100.00
Registered voters/turnout		414,695	84.69
PFP hold			
Source: Commission on Elections

=== Vice Mayor ===
Incumbent Vice Mayor Jocelyn Rodriguez of the Centrist Democratic Party ran for a second term.

Rodriguez won re-election against former city councilor Zaldy Ocon (Nacionalista Party) and Leo Lagrimas (Independent).

Candidate	Party	Votes	%
Jocelyn Rodriguez (incumbent)	Centrist Democratic Party	243,080	79.05
Zaldy Ocon	Nacionalista Party	54,548	17.74
Leo Lagrimas	Independent	9,859	3.21
Total		307,487	100.00
Valid votes		307,487	87.55
Invalid/blank votes		43,708	12.45
Total votes		351,195	100.00
Registered voters/turnout		414,695	84.69
CDP hold			
Source: Commission on Elections

=== City Council ===
The Cagayan de Oro City Council is composed of 18 councilors, 16 of whom are elected.

The Partido Federal ng Pilipinas won 10 seats, gaining a majority in the city council.

Party	Votes	%	Seats	+/–
Partido Federal ng Pilipinas	769,687	36.62	10	New
Padayon Pilipino	398,988	18.98	2	–2
Centrist Democratic Party	255,409	12.15	1	–1
National Unity Party	168,137	8.00	1	–8
PDP–Laban	123,042	5.85	2	+1
Lakas–CMD	104,027	4.95	0	0
Nationalist People's Coalition	75,734	3.60	0	New
Nacionalista Party	58,283	2.77	0	New
Independent	148,382	7.06	0	0
Total	2,101,689	100.00	16	0
Total votes	351,195	–		
Registered voters/turnout	414,695	84.69		
Source: Commission on Elections

==== 1st district ====
Cagayan de Oro's 1st councilor district consists of the same area as Cagayan de Oro's 1st legislative district. Eight councilors are elected from this councilor district.

22 candidates were included in the ballot.

Candidate	Party	Votes	%
Des Dahino	Partido Federal ng Pilipinas	108,315	9.62
Roger Abaday (incumbent)	Partido Federal ng Pilipinas	95,879	8.52
Antuy Roa Pascual	Partido Federal ng Pilipinas	84,132	7.47
Aga Suan (incumbent)	Padayon Pilipino	81,281	7.22
George Goking (incumbent)	Partido Federal ng Pilipinas	80,044	7.11
Jing Daba	Partido Federal ng Pilipinas	77,675	6.90
Al Legaspi	Partido Federal ng Pilipinas	71,979	6.39
Imee Moreno (incumbent)	National Unity Party	69,530	6.18
Manny Darimbang	Centrist Democratic Party	64,296	5.71
Adonis Gumahad	Centrist Democratic Party	56,694	5.04
Win Militante	Padayon Pilipino	55,748	4.95
Jose Abbu Jr. (incumbent)	Padayon Pilipino	54,904	4.88
Rossana Calingin	National Unity Party	43,531	3.87
Ina Pizarro	Lakas–CMD	43,326	3.85
Edwin Micabani	Nacionalista Party	35,886	3.19
Malvern Esparcia (incumbent)	Nationalist People's Coalition	35,514	3.15
Cyril Francis Casiño	National Unity Party	24,492	2.18
Christian Beja	Independent	13,479	1.20
Roberto Amplayo	Independent	12,598	1.12
Brad Calonia	Independent	6,461	0.57
Garnet John Willkom	Independent	5,297	0.47
Kenneth Jude Teves	Independent	4,912	0.44
Total		1,125,973	100.00
Total votes		184,555	–
Registered voters/turnout		211,679	87.19
Source: Commission on Elections

==== 2nd district ====
Cagayan de Oro's 2nd councilor district consists of the same area as Cagayan de Oro's 2nd legislative district. Eight councilors are elected from this councilor district.

28 candidates were included in the ballot.

Candidate	Party	Votes	%
Yvy Emano (incumbent)	Padayon Pilipino	83,254	8.53
Jonjon Rodriguez	Centrist Democratic Party	80,881	8.29
Paolo Gaane	Partido Federal ng Pilipinas	74,645	7.65
Girlie Balaba (incumbent)	PDP–Laban	63,178	6.48
Alam Lim	Partido Federal ng Pilipinas	60,982	6.25
Eric Salcedo	PDP–Laban	59,864	6.14
Gigi Go	Partido Federal ng Pilipinas	58,277	5.97
Edgar Cabanlas (incumbent)	Partido Federal ng Pilipinas	57,759	5.92
Anthony Atterviry III	Independent	53,831	5.52
Anthony Abejuela	Centrist Democratic Party	53,538	5.49
Boboy Sabal	Padayon Pilipino	50,915	5.22
Ian Achas (incumbent)	Padayon Pilipino	45,203	4.63
RC Cagang	Lakas–CMD	40,757	4.18
James Judith II (incumbent)	Nationalist People's Coalition	40,220	4.12
Jasmin Borja	Padayon Pilipino	27,683	2.84
Roger Villazorda	Nacionalista Party	22,397	2.30
Maricris Mulat	National Unity Party	21,967	2.25
Jess Jardin	Lakas–CMD	19,944	2.04
BJ Raven Pitogo	Independent	15,872	1.63
Ike Olandesca	National Unity Party	8,617	0.88
Sam Rollo	Independent	6,383	0.65
Domer Postrero	Independent	5,651	0.58
Edison Lapiz	Independent	5,021	0.51
Rudy Oblimar	Independent	4,329	0.44
Kenneth Sarenas	Independent	3,810	0.39
Rene Abris	Independent	3,724	0.38
Elmer Cotiamco	Independent	3,707	0.38
Unotan Lucman Jr.	Independent	3,307	0.34
Total		975,716	100.00
Total votes		166,640	–
Registered voters/turnout		203,016	82.08
Source: Commission on Elections

== Camiguin ==
=== Governor ===
Incumbent Governor Xavier Jesus Romualdo of Lakas–CMD ran for a second term. He was previously affiliated with PDP–Laban.

Romualdo won re-election against Homer Mabale (Independent).

Candidate	Party	Votes	%
Xavier Jesus Romualdo (incumbent)	Lakas–CMD	42,067	71.09
Homer Mabale	Independent	17,105	28.91
Total		59,172	100.00
Valid votes		59,172	98.14
Invalid/blank votes		1,122	1.86
Total votes		60,294	100.00
Registered voters/turnout		66,557	90.59
Lakas hold			
Source: Commission on Elections

=== Vice Governor ===
Incumbent Vice Governor Rodin Romualdo of the Partido Federal ng Pilipinas ran for a third term. He was previously affiliated with PDP–Laban.

Romualdo won re-election against two other candidates.

Candidate	Party	Votes	%
Rodin Romualdo (incumbent)	Partido Federal ng Pilipinas	40,857	70.67
Eleanor Popera-Jose	Independent	16,651	28.80
Berms Daa	Reform PH Party	302	0.52
Total		57,810	100.00
Valid votes		57,810	95.88
Invalid/blank votes		2,484	4.12
Total votes		60,294	100.00
Registered voters/turnout		66,557	90.59
PFP hold			
Source: Commission on Elections

=== Provincial Board ===
Since Camiguin's reclassification as a 3rd class province in 2025, the Camiguin Provincial Board is composed of 11 board members, eight of whom are elected.

The Partido Federal ng Pilipinas won six seats, gaining a majority in the provincial board.

Party	Votes	%	Seats	+/–
Partido Federal ng Pilipinas	122,184	75.52	6	+6
Reform PH Party	539	0.33	0	New
Independent	39,060	24.14	2	+2
Total	161,783	100.00	8	+2
Total votes	60,294	–		
Registered voters/turnout	66,557	90.59		
Source: Commission on Elections

==== 1st district ====
Camiguin's 1st provincial district consists of the municipalities of Mahinog and Mambajao. Five board members are elected from this provincial district.

Six candidates were included in the ballot.

Candidate	Party	Votes	%
Shella Babanto (incumbent)	Partido Federal ng Pilipinas	25,868	25.97
Marivic Jansol (incumbent)	Partido Federal ng Pilipinas	25,163	25.26
Louis Bollozos (incumbent)	Partido Federal ng Pilipinas	24,679	24.78
Carlo Borromeo	Independent	8,873	8.91
Lourdes Mendoza-Gamutan	Independent	7,899	7.93
Alma Concepcion Parreño	Independent	7,124	7.15
Total		99,606	100.00
Total votes		35,453	–
Registered voters/turnout		38,832	91.30
Source: Commission on Elections

==== 2nd district ====
Camiguin's 2nd provincial district consists of the municipalities of Catarman, Guinsiliban and Sagay. Three board members are elected from this provincial district.

Seven candidates were included in the ballot.

Candidate	Party	Votes	%
Boyet Planco (incumbent)	Partido Federal ng Pilipinas	15,852	25.49
Bem-bem Loquias	Partido Federal ng Pilipinas	15,806	25.42
Webb Bajenio (incumbent)	Partido Federal ng Pilipinas	14,816	23.83
Jun Narido	Independent	5,232	8.41
Garee Bacsin	Independent	5,050	8.12
Hilario Cain	Independent	4,882	7.85
Becky Capricho	Reform PH Party	539	0.87
Total		62,177	100.00
Total votes		24,841	–
Registered voters/turnout		27,725	89.60
Source: Commission on Elections

== Iligan ==
=== Mayor ===
Incumbent Mayor Frederick Siao of the Nacionalista Party ran for a second term.

Siao won re-election against former Iligan City Police Office director Roy Ga (Pwersa ng Masang Pilipino), former National Commission on Senior Citizens chairman Franklin Quijano (Independent), and former Police Regional Office 10 director Rolando Anduyan (National Unity Party).

Candidate	Party	Votes	%
Frederick Siao (incumbent)	Nacionalista Party	74,458	47.41
Roy Ga	Pwersa ng Masang Pilipino	68,084	43.35
Franklin Quijano	Independent	10,386	6.61
Rolando Anduyan	National Unity Party	4,120	2.62
Total		157,048	100.00
Valid votes		157,048	97.46
Invalid/blank votes		4,085	2.54
Total votes		161,133	100.00
Registered voters/turnout		189,050	85.23
Nacionalista hold			
Source: Commission on Elections

=== Vice Mayor ===
Incumbent Vice Mayor Dodong Alemania of the Nacionalista Party ran for a second term.

Alemania was defeated by Wekwek Uy of the Pwersa ng Masang Pilipino. Former Iligan vice mayor Jemar Vera Cruz (PDP–Laban), and Jun Visaya (National Unity Party) also ran for vice mayor.

Candidate	Party	Votes	%
Wekwek Uy	Pwersa ng Masang Pilipino	71,491	46.48
Dodong Alemania (incumbent)	Nacionalista Party	67,223	43.71
Jemar Vera Cruz	PDP–Laban	13,387	8.70
Jun Visaya	National Unity Party	1,709	1.11
Total		153,810	100.00
Valid votes		153,810	95.46
Invalid/blank votes		7,323	4.54
Total votes		161,133	100.00
Registered voters/turnout		189,050	85.23
PMP gain from Nacionalista			
Source: Commission on Elections

=== City Council ===
The Iligan City Council is composed of 14 councilors, 12 of whom are elected.

48 candidates were included in the ballot.

The Nacionalista Party won eight seats, gaining a majority in the city council.

Party	Votes	%	Seats	+/–
Pwersa ng Masang Pilipino	714,880	43.05	3	New
Nacionalista Party	706,236	42.53	8	+1
PDP–Laban	85,581	5.15	0	–3
National Unity Party	66,317	3.99	0	–1
Nationalist People's Coalition	61,941	3.73	1	New
Independent	25,654	1.54	0	0
Total	1,660,609	100.00	12	0
Total votes	161,133	–		
Registered voters/turnout	189,050	85.23		
Source: Commission on Elections

Candidate	Party	Votes	%
Nhicolle Capangpangan (incumbent)	Pwersa ng Masang Pilipino	74,307	4.47
Derrick Siao	Nacionalista Party	69,286	4.17
Bong Abragan (incumbent)	Nacionalista Party	69,187	4.17
Tete Pacaña (incumbent)	Nacionalista Party	67,503	4.06
Michelle Sweet (incumbent)	Nacionalista Party	67,210	4.05
Marlene Young (incumbent)	Nacionalista Party	67,091	4.04
Samuel Huertas (incumbent)	Nacionalista Party	66,619	4.01
King Belmonte	Nacionalista Party	65,360	3.94
Ian Uy	Pwersa ng Masang Pilipino	63,757	3.84
Ryan Ong (incumbent)	Pwersa ng Masang Pilipino	63,308	3.81
Ramil Emborong (incumbent)	Nacionalista Party	63,132	3.80
Pisyong Larrazabal (incumbent)	Nationalist People's Coalition	61,941	3.73
Macky Macapagal	Pwersa ng Masang Pilipino	61,222	3.69
Nick Echavez	Pwersa ng Masang Pilipino	60,460	3.64
Demy Plando	Pwersa ng Masang Pilipino	59,139	3.56
Ian Loking	Pwersa ng Masang Pilipino	58,926	3.55
Melvin Anggot	Nacionalista Party	58,802	3.54
Grace Catubig	Pwersa ng Masang Pilipino	58,392	3.52
Betsy Zalsos (incumbent)	Nacionalista Party	58,014	3.49
Dexter Sumaoy	Pwersa ng Masang Pilipino	56,411	3.40
Vanni Encabo	Pwersa ng Masang Pilipino	55,638	3.35
Irvine Sumagang	Nacionalista Party	54,032	3.25
Dongki Baller	Pwersa ng Masang Pilipino	53,895	3.25
Richard Veloso	Pwersa ng Masang Pilipino	49,425	2.98
Sol Bacsarpa	PDP–Laban	17,710	1.07
Voltaire Rovira II	PDP–Laban	16,638	1.00
Tata Tamula	National Unity Party	14,529	0.87
Bong Magallanes	PDP–Laban	13,894	0.84
Rex Razo	Independent	13,261	0.80
MJ Gayo	National Unity Party	12,332	0.74
Cocoy Sabarre	National Unity Party	9,235	0.56
Dominic Carillo	PDP–Laban	8,740	0.53
Mike Macarambon	PDP–Laban	8,473	0.51
Randy Salcedo	PDP–Laban	7,797	0.47
Leo Ricarte	National Unity Party	7,703	0.46
Val Murillo	PDP–Laban	6,861	0.41
Jonathan Maeslim	PDP–Laban	5,468	0.33
Albert Ong	National Unity Party	5,395	0.32
Allysah Pangandaman	National Unity Party	5,146	0.31
Alfredo Obina Jr.	National Unity Party	5,031	0.30
Troy Fernan	National Unity Party	4,016	0.24
Lilibeth Imperial	National Unity Party	2,930	0.18
Julie Lao	Independent	2,710	0.16
Kenneth Austria	Independent	2,659	0.16
Concordio Baguio	Independent	2,439	0.15
Scott Summer	Independent	2,228	0.13
Jun Biston	Independent	1,205	0.07
Ike Marin	Independent	1,152	0.07
Total		1,660,609	100.00
Total votes		161,133	–
Registered voters/turnout		189,050	85.23
Source: Commission on Elections

== Lanao del Norte ==
=== Governor ===
Term-limited incumbent Governor Imelda Dimaporo of the Partido Federal ng Pilipinas ran for the House of Representatives in Lanao del Norte's 1st legislative district. She was previously affiliated with PDP–Laban.

Dimaporo endorsed her son, representative Mohamad Khalid Dimaporo (Lakas–CMD), who won the election against Sabdullah Abubacar (United Nationalist Alliance).

Candidate	Party	Votes	%
Mohamad Khalid Dimaporo	Lakas–CMD	258,853	90.28
Sabdullah Abubacar	United Nationalist Alliance	27,883	9.72
Total		286,736	100.00
Valid votes		286,736	88.44
Invalid/blank votes		37,482	11.56
Total votes		324,218	100.00
Registered voters/turnout		384,211	84.39
Lakas–CMD hold			
Source: Commission on Elections

=== Vice Governor ===
Incumbent Vice Governor Allan Lim of Lakas–CMD ran for a second term. He was previously affiliated with PDP–Laban.

Lim won re-election against Mack Salacop (United Nationalist Alliance).

Candidate	Party	Votes	%
Allan Lim (incumbent)	Lakas–CMD	211,476	84.71
Mack Salacop	United Nationalist Alliance	38,175	15.29
Total		249,651	100.00
Valid votes		249,651	77.00
Invalid/blank votes		74,567	23.00
Total votes		324,218	100.00
Registered voters/turnout		384,211	84.39
Lakas–CMD hold			
Source: Commission on Elections

=== Provincial Board ===
The Lanao del Norte Provincial Board is composed of 13 board members, 10 of whom are elected.

Lakas–CMD won six seats, becoming the largest party in the provincial board.

Party	Votes	%	Seats	+/–
Lakas–CMD	484,081	57.40	6	New
United Lanao Alliance for Development	292,344	34.67	4	New
United Nationalist Alliance	44,906	5.32	0	New
Independent	21,997	2.61	0	0
Total	843,328	100.00	10	0
Total votes	324,218	–		
Registered voters/turnout	384,211	84.39		
Source: Commission on Elections

==== 1st district ====
Lanao del Norte's 1st provincial district consists of the same area as Lanao del Norte's 1st legislative district. Five board members are elected from this provincial district.

Seven candidates were included in the ballot.

Candidate	Party	Votes	%
Grecille Matalines (incumbent)	Lakas–CMD	76,550	19.99
Sidick Dibaratun (incumbent)	Lakas–CMD	73,830	19.28
Bob Andot	United Lanao Alliance for Development	63,951	16.70
Eleuterio Obial Jr. (incumbent)	Lakas–CMD	63,853	16.67
Setty Deamila Macarambon	United Lanao Alliance for Development	61,319	16.01
Ali Mimbisa Jr.	Independent	21,997	5.74
Ranolfo Daligdig	United Nationalist Alliance	21,534	5.62
Total		383,034	100.00
Total votes		145,543	–
Registered voters/turnout		177,487	82.00
Source: Commission on Elections

==== 2nd district ====
Lanao del Norte's 2nd provincial district consists of the same area as Lanao del Norte's 2nd legislative district. Five board members are elected from this provincial district.

Six candidates were included in the ballot.

Candidate	Party	Votes	%
Cristy Atay (incumbent)	Lakas–CMD	100,729	21.88
Apta Malawani	Lakas–CMD	90,749	19.72
Maida Tawantawan	United Lanao Alliance for Development	86,939	18.89
Superman Usop Jr. (incumbent)	United Lanao Alliance for Development	80,135	17.41
Abdany Buanding (incumbent)	Lakas–CMD	78,370	17.03
Achmad Taha (incumbent)	United Nationalist Alliance	23,372	5.08
Total		460,294	100.00
Total votes		178,675	–
Registered voters/turnout		206,724	86.43
Source: Commission on Elections

== Misamis Occidental ==
=== Governor ===
Incumbent Governor Henry Oaminal of the Nacionalista Party ran for a second term.

Oaminal won re-election against Bonifacio mayor Samson Dumanjug (National Unity Party) and two other candidates.

Candidate	Party	Votes	%
Henry Oaminal (incumbent)	Nacionalista Party	297,067	88.13
Samson Dumanjug	National Unity Party	38,330	11.37
Marc Lester Malandaya	Independent	1,256	0.37
Bibiano Salvanera	Independent	416	0.12
Total		337,069	100.00
Valid votes		337,069	92.25
Invalid/blank votes		28,312	7.75
Total votes		365,381	100.00
Registered voters/turnout		437,401	83.53
Nacionalista hold			
Source: Commission on Elections

=== Vice Governor ===
Incumbent Vice Governor Rowena Gutierrez of Asenso Pinoy ran for a second term. She was previously affiliated with PDP–Laban.

Gutierrez won re-election against Ruel Yap (Independent).

Candidate	Party	Votes	%
Rowena Gutierrez (incumbent)	Asenso Pinoy	285,168	88.10
Ruel Yap	Independent	38,505	11.90
Total		323,673	100.00
Valid votes		323,673	88.59
Invalid/blank votes		41,708	11.41
Total votes		365,381	100.00
Registered voters/turnout		437,401	83.53
Asenso Pinoy hold			
Source: Commission on Elections

=== Provincial Board ===
The Misamis Occidental Provincial Board is composed of 13 board members, 10 of whom are elected.

Asenso Pinoy won 10 seats, maintaining its majority in the provincial board.

Party	Votes	%	Seats	+/–
Asenso Pinoy	1,331,386	92.90	10	+3
Katipunan ng Nagkakaisang Pilipino	26,913	1.88	0	New
PDP–Laban	11,493	0.80	0	–2
Independent	63,383	4.42	0	0
Total	1,433,175	100.00	10	0
Total votes	365,381	–		
Registered voters/turnout	437,401	83.53		
Source: Commission on Elections

==== 1st district ====
Misamis Occidental's 1st provincial district consists of the same area as Misamis Occidental's 1st legislative district. Five board members are elected from this provincial district.

Nine candidates were included in the ballot.

Candidate	Party	Votes	%
Alex Guantero (incumbent)	Asenso Pinoy	112,843	19.12
Winston Catane (incumbent)	Asenso Pinoy	111,501	18.89
Tata Paylaga-Lim (incumbent)	Asenso Pinoy	109,492	18.55
Agnes Villanueva (incumbent)	Asenso Pinoy	105,902	17.94
Donna Iyog (incumbent)	Asenso Pinoy	107,074	18.14
Rico Recoleto	Katipunan ng Nagkakaisang Pilipino	14,632	2.48
Rojim Banguis	Independent	11,823	2.00
Bonnie Macas	PDP–Laban	11,493	1.95
Ann Bangga	Independent	5,452	0.92
Total		590,212	100.00
Total votes		164,334	–
Registered voters/turnout		200,224	82.08
Source: Commission on Elections

==== 2nd district ====
Misamis Occidental's 2nd provincial district consists of the same area as Misamis Occidental's 2nd legislative district. Five board members are elected from this provincial district.

10 candidates were included in the ballot.

Candidate	Party	Votes	%
Calven Tito Decina (incumbent)	Asenso Pinoy	159,788	18.96
Eduardo Cebedo (incumbent)	Asenso Pinoy	157,546	18.69
Heinjie Estaño (incumbent)	Asenso Pinoy	156,061	18.51
Emie Lahaylahay (incumbent)	Asenso Pinoy	155,652	18.46
Jerry Cuizon (incumbent)	Asenso Pinoy	155,527	18.45
Presli Deles	Independent	13,461	1.60
Rocky Medina	Independent	12,865	1.53
Christopher Bodiongan	Katipunan ng Nagkakaisang Pilipino	12,281	1.46
Nilo Araco	Independent	10,073	1.19
Robert Taclob	Independent	9,709	1.15
Total		842,963	100.00
Total votes		201,047	–
Registered voters/turnout		237,177	84.77
Source: Commission on Elections

== Misamis Oriental ==
=== Governor ===
Incumbent Governor Peter Unabia of Lakas–CMD ran for a second term.

Unabia was defeated by former representative Juliette Uy of the National Unity Party. Lito Simacon (Independent) also ran for governor.

Candidate	Party	Votes	%
Juliette Uy	National Unity Party	327,305	57.76
Peter Unabia (incumbent)	Lakas–CMD	235,023	41.48
Lito Simacon	Independent	4,306	0.76
Total		566,634	100.00
Valid votes		566,634	93.30
Invalid/blank votes		40,712	6.70
Total votes		607,346	100.00
Registered voters/turnout		691,602	87.82
NUP gain from Lakas			
Source: Commission on Elections

=== Vice Governor ===
Incumbent Vice Governor Jigjag Pelaez of Lakas–CMD ran for a third term. He was previously affiliated with Padayon Pilipino.

Pelaez won re-election against provincial board member Erik Khu (National Unity Party) and Reynaldo Cagampang (Independent).

Candidate	Party	Votes	%
Jigjag Pelaez (incumbent)	Lakas–CMD	285,650	61.19
Erik Khu	National Unity Party	169,760	36.37
Reynaldo Cagampang	Independent	11,411	2.44
Total		466,821	100.00
Valid votes		466,821	76.86
Invalid/blank votes		140,525	23.14
Total votes		607,346	100.00
Registered voters/turnout		691,602	87.82
Lakas hold			
Source: Commission on Elections

=== Provincial Board ===
The Misamis Oriental Provincial Board is composed of 14 board members, 10 of whom are elected

Lakas–CMD won five seats, becoming the largest party in the provincial board.

Party	Votes	%	Seats	+/–
National Unity Party	626,339	34.13	1	–2
Lakas–CMD	503,451	27.44	5	+2
Padayon Pilipino	466,853	25.44	3	–1
Nacionalista Party	238,419	12.99	1	New
Total	1,835,062	100.00	10	0
Total votes	607,346	–		
Registered voters/turnout	691,602	87.82		
Source: Commission on Elections

==== 1st district ====
Misamis Oriental's 1st provincial district consists of the same area as Misamis Oriental's 1st legislative district. Five board members are elected from this provincial district.

10 candidates were included in the ballot.

Candidate	Party	Votes	%
Marlon Kho (incumbent)	Lakas–CMD	109,382	13.09
Rommel Maslog	Lakas–CMD	106,737	12.77
Rey Buhisan (incumbent)	Lakas–CMD	103,563	12.39
Jabi Bernaldez (incumbent)	Lakas–CMD	95,321	11.41
Roy Aniscal	Lakas–CMD	88,448	10.58
Jerry Khu	National Unity Party	80,070	9.58
Christian Khu	National Unity Party	78,167	9.35
John Romualdo	National Unity Party	65,565	7.85
Jhubert Pamisa	National Unity Party	59,509	7.12
Leonard Winstanley	National Unity Party	48,993	5.86
Total		835,755	100.00
Total votes		266,153	–
Registered voters/turnout		300,911	88.45
Source: Commission on Elections

==== 2nd district ====
Misamis Oriental's 2nd provincial district consists of the same area as Misamis Oriental's 2nd legislative district. Five board members are elected from this provincial district.

Eight candidates were included in the ballot.

Candidate	Party	Votes	%
Say-say Emano (incumbent)	Padayon Pilipino	186,821	18.70
Dexter Yasay (incumbent)	Padayon Pilipino	148,092	14.82
Nancy Madjos	Padayon Pilipino	131,940	13.20
Princess Emano (incumbent)	National Unity Party	130,851	13.09
Pangky Acain (incumbent)	Nacionalista Party	123,002	12.31
Meraluna Abrogar	Nacionalista Party	115,417	11.55
Boris Olivier Actub	National Unity Party	90,911	9.10
Jun Lim	National Unity Party	72,273	7.23
Total		999,307	100.00
Total votes		341,193	–
Registered voters/turnout		390,691	87.33
Source: Commission on Elections

== Election-related incidents ==
On November 26, 2024, the acting COMELEC officer for Nunungan, Lanao del Norte was shot dead in an ambush in Salvador, Lanao del Norte.
