= 2010 Northern Mindanao local elections =

Local elections were held in Northern Mindanao on May 10, 2010, as part of the 2010 Philippine general election.

== Bukidnon ==
=== Governor ===
Term-limited incumbent governor Jose Maria Zubiri Jr. of Lakas–Kampi–CMD ran for Vice Governor of Bukidnon. Lakas–Kampi–CMD nominated vice governor Alex Calingasan, who won the election.

Candidate	Party	Votes	%
Alex Calingasan	Lakas–Kampi–CMD	237,279	54.22
Diosdado Tabios	Nacionalista Party	119,399	27.28
Ernesto Tabios	Liberal Party	60,923	13.92
Romeo Zuce	Independent	15,608	3.57
Delfina Bicatulo	Independent	4,450	1.02
Total		437,659	100.00
Valid votes		437,659	79.56
Invalid/blank votes		112,439	20.44
Total votes		550,098	100.00
Lakas–Kampi–CMD hold			
Source: Commission on Elections

=== Vice governor ===
Term-limited incumbent vice governor Alex Calingasan of Lakas–Kampi–CMD ran for Governor of Bukidnon. Lakas–Kampi–CMD nominated governor Jose Maria Zubiri Jr., who won the election.

Candidate	Party	Votes	%
Jose Maria Zubiri Jr.	Lakas–Kampi–CMD	383,254	86.16
Emma Asok	Liberal Party	39,115	8.79
Johnny Dumala Sr.	Independent	15,127	3.40
Joevy Baldevarona	Independent	7,332	1.65
Total		444,828	100.00
Valid votes		444,828	80.86
Invalid/blank votes		105,270	19.14
Total votes		550,098	100.00
Lakas–Kampi–CMD hold			
Source: Commission on Elections

=== Provincial board ===
The Bukidnon Provincial Board is composed of 13 board members, 10 of whom are elected.

Party	Votes	%	Seats
Lakas–Kampi–CMD	714,434	67.38	8
Liberal Party	258,544	24.38	2
Nacionalista Party	42,524	4.01	0
Pwersa ng Masang Pilipino	12,078	1.14	0
Independent	32,746	3.09	0
Total	1,060,326	100.00	10
Total votes	550,098	–	
Source: Commission on Elections

==== 1st district ====
Candidate	Party	Votes	%
Clive Quiño	Lakas–Kampi–CMD	77,254	30.14
Jay Albarece	Liberal Party	52,076	20.31
Rogelio Lago	Lakas–Kampi–CMD	47,972	18.71
Alfredo Guden	Liberal Party	39,700	15.49
Evelio Cordovez	Lakas–Kampi–CMD	39,357	15.35
Total		256,359	100.00
Total votes		164,516	–
Source: Commission on Elections

==== 2nd district ====
Candidate	Party	Votes	%
Nemesio Beltran Jr.	Lakas–Kampi–CMD	94,140	18.34
Manuel Dinlayan	Lakas–Kampi–CMD	93,202	18.15
Ranulfo Pepito	Lakas–Kampi–CMD	77,328	15.06
Renato Centillas	Liberal Party	67,416	13.13
Gino Armstrong Garcia	Lakas–Kampi–CMD	55,477	10.81
Ruth Polinar	Liberal Party	55,135	10.74
George Tabios	Liberal Party	44,217	8.61
Victor Noval	Nacionalista Party	18,053	3.52
Elsie Sumalhay	Independent	8,418	1.64
Total		513,386	100.00
Total votes		208,845	–
Source: Commission on Elections

==== 3rd district ====
Candidate	Party	Votes	%
Gordon Torres	Lakas–Kampi–CMD	86,369	29.72
Alfeo Baguio	Lakas–Kampi–CMD	72,875	25.08
Marivic Montesclaros	Lakas–Kampi–CMD	70,460	24.25
Angelus Tan Jr.	Nacionalista Party	24,471	8.42
Eleazer Alvarez	Independent	13,413	4.62
Ben Acuña	Pwersa ng Masang Pilipino	12,078	4.16
Renfrido Olivo	Independent	6,914	2.38
Teresita Saloay-ay	Independent	4,001	1.38
Total		290,581	100.00
Total votes		176,737	–
Source: Commission on Elections

== Cagayan de Oro ==
=== Mayor ===
Incumbent mayor Constantino Jaraula of Lakas–Kampi–CMD retired. Lakas–Kampi–CMD nominated representative Rolando Uy, who was defeated by vice mayor Vicente Emano of Pwersa ng Masang Pilipino.

Candidate	Party	Votes	%
Vicente Emano	Pwersa ng Masang Pilipino	99,853	49.21
Rolando Uy	Lakas–Kampi–CMD	97,723	48.16
Berchmans Abejuela	Liberal Party	2,732	1.35
Jasper Uy	Independent	1,774	0.87
Romerico Lloren	Independent	360	0.18
Felix Borres Jr.	Independent	237	0.12
Sulpicio Illana	Independent	214	0.11
Total		202,893	100.00
Valid votes		202,893	95.23
Invalid/blank votes		10,164	4.77
Total votes		213,057	100.00
Pwersa ng Masang Pilipino gain from Lakas–Kampi–CMD			
Source: Commission on Elections

=== Vice mayor ===
Incumbent vice mayor Vicente Emano of Pwersa ng Masang Pilipino (PMP) ran for Mayor of Cagayan de Oro. The PMP nominated city councilor Caesar Ian Acenas, who won the election.

Candidate	Party	Votes	%
Caesar Ian Acenas	Pwersa ng Masang Pilipino	108,793	56.64
Zaldy Ocon	Lakas–Kampi–CMD	79,382	41.33
Carmelito Damo	Lapiang Manggagawa	3,913	2.04
Total		192,088	100.00
Valid votes		192,088	90.16
Invalid/blank votes		20,969	9.84
Total votes		213,057	100.00
Pwersa ng Masang Pilipino hold			
Source: Commission on Elections

=== City council ===
The Cagayan de Oro City Council is composed of 19 councilors, 16 of whom are elected.

Party	Votes	%	Seats
Pwersa ng Masang Pilipino	640,771	49.16	13
Lakas–Kampi–CMD	410,365	31.48	2
Liberal Party	58,347	4.48	0
PDP–Laban	27,285	2.09	0
Lapiang Manggagawa	9,322	0.72	0
Bangon Pilipinas	4,826	0.37	0
Nacionalista Party	3,982	0.31	0
Independent	148,601	11.40	1
Total	1,303,499	100.00	16
Total votes	213,057	–	
Source: Commission on Elections

==== 1st district ====
Candidate	Party	Votes	%
Roger Abaday	Lakas–Kampi–CMD	43,015	7.38
Annie Daba	Pwersa ng Masang Pilipino	41,641	7.14
Simeon Licayan	Pwersa ng Masang Pilipino	41,129	7.06
Dante Pajo	Pwersa ng Masang Pilipino	37,781	6.48
Adrian Barba	Pwersa ng Masang Pilipino	36,209	6.21
Alden Bacal	Pwersa ng Masang Pilipino	34,062	5.84
Alvin Calingin	Independent	34,058	5.84
Jose Pepe Abbu	Pwersa ng Masang Pilipino	28,263	4.85
Mary Cor Calizo	PDP–Laban	27,285	4.68
Yan Lam Lim	Pwersa ng Masang Pilipino	25,766	4.42
Maria Myrna Sabal	Lakas–Kampi–CMD	25,098	4.31
Myrna Marban	Lakas–Kampi–CMD	24,564	4.21
Marlyn Lagumen	Lakas–Kampi–CMD	23,925	4.11
Douglas Dabatian	Lakas–Kampi–CMD	22,508	3.86
Nicolas Raagas	Independent	20,461	3.51
Greg Macabodbod	Lakas–Kampi–CMD	18,286	3.14
Rey Mabunay	Lakas–Kampi–CMD	18,113	3.11
Casiano Gamotin Jr.	Independent	16,319	2.80
Samuel del Bando	Lakas–Kampi–CMD	12,199	2.09
Reynaldo Abacahin	Independent	11,052	1.90
Ben Joseph Acedera III	Liberal Party	10,755	1.85
Sheridan Maagad	Liberal Party	10,731	1.84
Rodulfo Galacio	Independent	4,546	0.78
Erwin Culanag	Nacionalista Party	3,982	0.68
Temotio Yap	Independent	3,809	0.65
Gerardo Tanasas Jr.	Bangon Pilipinas	2,492	0.43
Rey Angana	Lapiang Manggagawa	2,282	0.39
Jun Michael Agbon	Independent	1,466	0.25
Abundio Dumala	Independent	1,016	0.17
Total		582,813	100.00
Total votes		97,747	–
Source: Commission on Elections

==== 2nd district ====
Candidate	Party	Votes	%
Ramon Tabor	Pwersa ng Masang Pilipino	61,652	8.55
Ian Mark Nacaya	Pwersa ng Masang Pilipino	58,033	8.05
Nadya Emano	Pwersa ng Masang Pilipino	53,276	7.39
Alexander Dacer	Pwersa ng Masang Pilipino	48,621	6.75
President Elipe	Pwersa ng Masang Pilipino	46,033	6.39
Edgar Cabanlas	Lakas–Kampi–CMD	45,543	6.32
Juan Sia	Pwersa ng Masang Pilipino	45,131	6.26
Emmanuel Abejuela	Pwersa ng Masang Pilipino	44,558	6.18
Teodulfo Lao Jr.	Lakas–Kampi–CMD	40,684	5.65
Leon Gan Jr.	Pwersa ng Masang Pilipino	38,616	5.36
James Judith II	Lakas–Kampi–CMD	28,060	3.89
Rogelio Jaraula Jr.	Independent	28,019	3.89
Imelda Austria	Lakas–Kampi–CMD	27,088	3.76
Alejo Olano Jr.	Lakas–Kampi–CMD	23,497	3.26
Rogelio Villazorda Jr.	Lakas–Kampi–CMD	23,066	3.20
Raul Ramon Roa	Lakas–Kampi–CMD	22,707	3.15
Zoilo Antonio Velez	Liberal Party	16,768	2.33
Raoul de la Serna	Liberal Party	13,899	1.93
Dell Bersales	Lakas–Kampi–CMD	12,012	1.67
Morito Yee	Independent	9,244	1.28
Eric Saarenas	Liberal Party	6,194	0.86
Enrique Ampo	Independent	5,974	0.83
Rizaldy Balinado	Independent	3,996	0.55
Marlou Almeda	Lapiang Manggagawa	2,683	0.37
Vivian Libao	Bangon Pilipinas	2,334	0.32
Domingo Sonny David	Lapiang Manggagawa	2,201	0.31
Leodegario Lagrimas	Independent	2,195	0.30
Jenny Ramos	Independent	2,183	0.30
Chito Fernandez	Lapiang Manggagawa	2,156	0.30
Dennis Gaston	Independent	1,353	0.19
Espenito Caramba	Independent	1,244	0.17
Samie Tagalog	Independent	899	0.12
Alfredo Lonon	Independent	767	0.11
Total		720,686	100.00
Total votes		115,310	–
Source: Commission on Elections

== Camiguin ==
=== Governor ===
Term-limited incumbent governor Jurdin Jesus Romualdo of the Nationalist People's Coalition won re-election to a second term.

Candidate	Party	Votes	%
Jurdin Jesus Romualdo	Nationalist People's Coalition	34,540	75.89
Rogelio Gallardo	Liberal Party	10,974	24.11
Total		45,514	100.00
Valid votes		45,514	97.19
Invalid/blank votes		1,316	2.81
Total votes		46,830	100.00
Nationalist People's Coalition hold			
Source: Commission on Elections

=== Vice governor ===
Former vice governor Leo Lasacar of Lakas–Kampi–CMD won the election.

Candidate	Party	Votes	%
Leo Lasacar	Lakas–Kampi–CMD	32,567	75.35
Juan Margarito Neri	Nacionalista Party	9,753	22.56
Nicolaas Vicente Elio	Independent	902	2.09
Total		43,222	100.00
Valid votes		43,222	92.30
Invalid/blank votes		3,608	7.70
Total votes		46,830	100.00
Source: Commission on Elections

=== Provincial board ===
The Camiguin Provincial Board is composed of nine board members, six of whom are elected.

Party	Votes	%	Seats
Lakas–Kampi–CMD	92,154	80.46	6
Nacionalista Party	12,878	11.24	0
Liberal Party	3,871	3.38	0
Pwersa ng Masang Pilipino	3,783	3.30	0
Independent	1,854	1.62	0
Total	114,540	100.00	6
Total votes	46,830	–	
Source: Commission on Elections

==== 1st district ====
Candidate	Party	Votes	%
Jesus Pecuribot	Lakas–Kampi–CMD	20,256	30.91
Eugenio Peñalosa	Lakas–Kampi–CMD	19,815	30.24
Hermogenes Lobido	Lakas–Kampi–CMD	17,801	27.17
Jesus Wong	Liberal Party	3,871	5.91
Jose Arce	Pwersa ng Masang Pilipino	3,783	5.77
Total		65,526	100.00
Total votes		25,916	–
Source: Commission on Elections

==== 2nd district ====
Candidate	Party	Votes	%
Virgilio Lacerna	Lakas–Kampi–CMD	11,707	23.89
Periolo Banaag	Lakas–Kampi–CMD	11,449	23.36
Jose Ladao	Lakas–Kampi–CMD	11,126	22.70
Eleuterio Pabillore	Nacionalista Party	4,575	9.33
Rogen Dal	Nacionalista Party	4,185	8.54
Franklin Go	Nacionalista Party	4,118	8.40
Emmanuel Bitas	Independent	1,072	2.19
Rico Banaag	Independent	782	1.60
Total		49,014	100.00
Total votes		20,914	–
Source: Commission on Elections

== Iligan ==
=== Mayor ===
Incumbent mayor Lawrence Cruz of the Liberal Party won re-election to a third term.

Candidate	Party	Votes	%
Lawrence Cruz	Liberal Party	63,448	66.81
Franklin Quijano	Pwersa ng Masang Pilipino	17,050	17.95
Alipio Cirilo Badelles	Nacionalista Party	12,579	13.25
Yuri Taongan	Independent	1,044	1.10
Ismael Naga Jr.	Partido Demokratiko Sosyalista ng Pilipinas	322	0.34
Samuel Acut	Independent	231	0.24
Voltaire Lluch	Independent	223	0.23
Alberto Ong Jr.	Philippine Green Republican Party	71	0.07
Total		94,968	100.00
Valid votes		94,968	95.88
Invalid/blank votes		4,083	4.12
Total votes		99,051	100.00
Liberal Party hold			
Source: Commission on Elections

=== Vice mayor ===
Incumbent vice mayor Henry Dy of the Liberal Party was re-elected to a third term.

Candidate	Party	Votes	%
Henry Dy	Liberal Party	52,336	56.02
Bernard Pacaña	Nacionalista Party	41,081	43.98
Total		93,417	100.00
Valid votes		93,417	94.31
Invalid/blank votes		5,634	5.69
Total votes		99,051	100.00
Liberal Party hold			
Source: Commission on Elections

=== City council ===
The Iligan City Council is composed of 14 councilors, 12 of whom are elected.

Party	Votes	%	Seats
Liberal Party	472,042	49.13	10
Nacionalista Party	223,522	23.27	1
Pwersa ng Masang Pilipino	89,466	9.31	0
Ang Kapatiran	25,416	2.65	0
Partido Demokratiko Sosyalista ng Pilipinas	23,301	2.43	0
Bangon Pilipinas	6,089	0.63	0
Independent	120,877	12.58	1
Total	960,713	100.00	12
Total votes	99,051	–	
Source: Commission on Elections

Candidate	Party	Votes	%
Ruderic Marzo	Liberal Party	57,463	5.98
Providencio Abragan	Liberal Party	56,468	5.88
Frederick Siao	Liberal Party	45,699	4.76
Marlene Young	Nacionalista Party	44,502	4.63
Simplicio Larrazabal III	Liberal Party	43,332	4.51
Moises Dalisay Jr.	Liberal Party	43,145	4.49
Ariel Anghay	Liberal Party	39,967	4.16
Michelle Sweet	Independent	39,341	4.09
Bayani Areola	Liberal Party	34,094	3.55
Chonilo Ruiz	Liberal Party	33,350	3.47
Roy Openiano	Liberal Party	32,772	3.41
Jose Zalsos	Liberal Party	31,641	3.29
Voltaire Rovira	Liberal Party	30,911	3.22
Wilfredo Bacareza	Nacionalista Party	26,988	2.81
Usafeno Obial	Independent	25,444	2.65
Vic Ramon Bueno	Ang Kapatiran	25,416	2.65
Roderico Dumaug Jr.	Nacionalista Party	24,744	2.58
Editha Palafox	Liberal Party	23,200	2.41
Glenn Quijoy	Nacionalista Party	21,416	2.23
Jose Ma. Boza	Nacionalista Party	21,256	2.21
Severino Madlangbayan	Nacionalista Party	18,701	1.95
Ricardo Abellanosa Jr.	Nacionalista Party	17,354	1.81
Dan Salatandre	Nacionalista Party	17,331	1.80
Demosthenes Plando	Pwersa ng Masang Pilipino	16,363	1.70
Belinda Lim	Pwersa ng Masang Pilipino	15,907	1.66
Robert Fuentes	Nacionalista Party	14,334	1.49
Sol Erwin Diaz	Pwersa ng Masang Pilipino	10,898	1.13
Alejandro Yañez	Nacionalista Party	9,855	1.03
Samuel Largo Jr.	Independent	8,826	0.92
Simeon Clerigo	Independent	8,570	0.89
Steve Librado	Pwersa ng Masang Pilipino	8,525	0.89
Nicolas Pogay	Pwersa ng Masang Pilipino	7,382	0.77
Jules Verne Padilla	Pwersa ng Masang Pilipino	7,240	0.75
Warlindo Gajo	Nacionalista Party	7,041	0.73
Ronaldo Espina	Independent	6,721	0.70
Henry Dabatos	Pwersa ng Masang Pilipino	6,443	0.67
Arnold Garbanzos	Bangon Pilipinas	6,089	0.63
Anita Sescon	Independent	6,002	0.62
Jerry Ong	Pwersa ng Masang Pilipino	5,994	0.62
Sim Quina	Pwersa ng Masang Pilipino	5,505	0.57
Heintze Madjus	Independent	5,299	0.55
Jose Cui	Pwersa ng Masang Pilipino	5,209	0.54
Jessie Erag	Partido Demokratiko Sosyalista ng Pilipinas	4,811	0.50
Wilfredo Echavez	Independent	4,744	0.49
Jude Andrew Lluch	Partido Demokratiko Sosyalista ng Pilipinas	4,729	0.49
Jose Booc	Independent	4,635	0.48
Albert Cabili	Partido Demokratiko Sosyalista ng Pilipinas	3,598	0.37
Michael Eric Echiverri	Partido Demokratiko Sosyalista ng Pilipinas	2,834	0.29
Primitivo de los Santos	Independent	2,571	0.27
Nardito Clet	Independent	2,228	0.23
Bienvenido Mansumayan	Partido Demokratiko Sosyalista ng Pilipinas	2,158	0.22
Peregrimo Torres	Partido Demokratiko Sosyalista ng Pilipinas	2,024	0.21
Wilbur Tom Burgos	Partido Demokratiko Sosyalista ng Pilipinas	1,838	0.19
Camal Tantua	Independent	1,752	0.18
Alan Amantiad	Independent	1,715	0.18
Andres Silva Jr.	Independent	1,398	0.15
Romeo Sumalinog	Partido Demokratiko Sosyalista ng Pilipinas	1,309	0.14
Bethuel Ortaleza	Independent	939	0.10
Michael Paras	Independent	692	0.07
Total		960,713	100.00
Total votes		99,051	–
Source: Commission on Elections

== Lanao del Norte ==
=== Lanao del Norte ===
Term-limited incumbent governor Mohamad Khalid Dimaporo of Lakas–Kampi–CMD won re-election to a second term.

Candidate	Party	Votes	%
Mohamad Khalid Dimaporo	Lakas–Kampi–CMD	205,267	87.15
Alijandro Batalo	Liberal Party	18,259	7.75
Amer Nagamura Moner Sr.	Independent	7,459	3.17
Michael Siangco	Independent	3,151	1.34
Zamvitory Dimaampao	Independent	1,402	0.60
Total		235,538	100.00
Valid votes		235,538	87.84
Invalid/blank votes		32,603	12.16
Total votes		268,141	100.00
Lakas–Kampi–CMD hold			
Source: Commission on Elections

=== Vice governor ===
Incumbent vice governor Irma Ali of Lakas–Kampi–CMD was re-elected to a second term.

Candidate	Party	Votes	%
Irma Ali	Lakas–Kampi–CMD	165,662	83.39
Warlino Relova	Independent	18,024	9.07
Ronald Lomansoc	Liberal Party	14,967	7.53
Total		198,653	100.00
Valid votes		198,653	74.09
Invalid/blank votes		69,488	25.91
Total votes		268,141	100.00
Lakas–Kampi–CMD hold			
Source: Commission on Elections

=== Provincial board ===
The Lanao del Norte Provincial Board is composed of 13 board members, 10 of whom are elected.

Party	Votes	%	Seats
Lakas–Kampi–CMD	621,694	78.16	10
Liberal Party	129,238	16.25	0
Independent	44,519	5.60	0
Total	795,451	100.00	10
Total votes	268,141	–	
Source: Commission on Elections

==== 1st district ====
Candidate	Party	Votes	%
Robert Matalines	Lakas–Kampi–CMD	60,373	19.02
Casimero Bagol	Lakas–Kampi–CMD	47,044	14.82
Baldomero Zamora	Lakas–Kampi–CMD	46,904	14.77
Alexander Ali	Lakas–Kampi–CMD	45,515	14.34
Mohammad Moamar Maruhom	Lakas–Kampi–CMD	35,826	11.28
Diego Palomares Jr.	Liberal Party	26,973	8.50
Mahmoud Salacop	Liberal Party	18,065	5.69
Rakim Alingan	Liberal Party	17,326	5.46
Soraida Ensugo	Liberal Party	10,425	3.28
Adap Dimasimpun	Liberal Party	9,024	2.84
Total		317,475	100.00
Total votes		115,835	–
Source: Commission on Elections

==== 2nd district ====
Candidate	Party	Votes	%
Benny Baguio	Lakas–Kampi–CMD	84,325	17.64
Tominaman Sumalipao	Lakas–Kampi–CMD	80,340	16.81
Acmad Cotongan	Lakas–Kampi–CMD	78,254	16.37
Macabangkit Tawantawan	Lakas–Kampi–CMD	76,120	15.93
Tawantawan Cauntongan	Lakas–Kampi–CMD	66,993	14.02
Edgar Pantillo	Independent	29,039	6.08
Mama Abbas	Liberal Party	28,162	5.89
Laome Obedencia	Liberal Party	19,263	4.03
Santiago Saladaga	Independent	15,480	3.24
Total		477,976	100.00
Total votes		152,306	–
Source: Commission on Elections

== Misamis Occidental ==
=== Governor ===
Term-limited incumbent Governor Loreto Leo Ocampos of the Liberal Party ran for the House of Representatives in Misamis Occidental's 2nd district. The Liberal Party nominated Ozamiz vice mayor Carlos Patricio Bernad, who was defeated by representative Herminia Ramiro of Lakas–Kampi–CMD.

Candidate	Party	Votes	%
Herminia Ramiro	Lakas–Kampi–CMD	128,130	51.93
Francisco Paylaga Jr.	Nacionalista Party	100,698	40.81
Carlos Patricio Bernad	Liberal Party	17,263	7.00
Carlo Zafra	Pwersa ng Masang Pilipino	649	0.26
Total		246,740	100.00
Valid votes		246,740	90.64
Invalid/blank votes		25,471	9.36
Total votes		272,211	100.00
Lakas–Kampi–CMD gain from Liberal Party			
Source: Commission on Elections

=== Vice governor ===
Incumbent Vice Governor Francisco Paylaga Jr. of the Nacionalista Party ran for Governor of Misamis Occidental. The Nacionalista Party nominated provincial board member Henry Oaminal, who won the election.

Candidate	Party	Votes	%
Henry Oaminal	Nacionalista Party	140,688	64.63
Henry Ken Regalado	Lakas–Kampi–CMD	76,991	35.37
Total		217,679	100.00
Valid votes		217,679	79.97
Invalid/blank votes		54,532	20.03
Total votes		272,211	100.00
Nacionalista Party hold			
Source: Commission on Elections

=== Provincial board ===
The Misamis Occidental Provincial Board is composed of 13 board members, 10 of whom are elected.

Party	Votes	%	Seats
Nacionalista Party	395,236	44.90	6
Lakas–Kampi–CMD	382,929	43.50	4
Pwersa ng Masang Pilipino	35,743	4.06	0
Liberal Party	20,701	2.35	0
Independent	45,731	5.19	0
Total	880,340	100.00	10
Total votes		–	
Source: Commission on Elections

==== 1st district ====
Candidate	Party	Votes	%
Zaldy Daminar	Nacionalista Party	48,268	10.47
Inocencio Pagalaran Jr.	Nacionalista Party	45,628	9.90
Edilma Bulawin	Nacionalista Party	44,361	9.63
Lovely Liezl Yape	Lakas–Kampi–CMD	40,655	8.82
Jim de los Santos	Nacionalista Party	39,938	8.67
Celso Bergado	Lakas–Kampi–CMD	38,130	8.27
Jino Anoos Jr.	Lakas–Kampi–CMD	37,791	8.20
Rolando Regalado	Nacionalista Party	37,333	8.10
Lucita Francisco	Lakas–Kampi–CMD	34,265	7.44
Gustavo Neri Jr.	Lakas–Kampi–CMD	30,246	6.56
Henry Famas	Independent	20,328	4.41
Roy Yap	Liberal Party	17,552	3.81
Ruben Cagas	Independent	8,868	1.92
Rodolfo Ala	Independent	6,209	1.35
Solomon Molina	Independent	3,744	0.81
Nathaniel Nillas	Liberal Party	3,149	0.68
Antonio Abejo	Pwersa ng Masang Pilipino	3,064	0.66
Lino Tayrus	Pwersa ng Masang Pilipino	1,319	0.29
Total		460,848	100.00
Total votes		131,065	–
Source: Commission on Elections

==== 2nd district ====
Candidate	Party	Votes	%
Ricardo Parojinog	Lakas–Kampi–CMD	58,672	13.99
Gerard Teodorico Olegario II	Nacionalista Party	51,361	12.24
Edwin Florida	Lakas–Kampi–CMD	41,267	9.84
Morpheus Agot	Nacionalista Party	38,322	9.14
Tito Decina	Lakas–Kampi–CMD	37,283	8.89
Elias Revelo	Nacionalista Party	36,025	8.59
Matronilo Cartajenas	Lakas–Kampi–CMD	35,272	8.41
Christopher Ramayrat	Nacionalista Party	29,553	7.04
Irene Luansing Jr.	Lakas–Kampi–CMD	29,348	7.00
Sherwin del Carmen	Nacionalista Party	24,447	5.83
Fortunato Alcuizar Jr.	Pwersa ng Masang Pilipino	15,345	3.66
Norman Bantug	Independent	6,582	1.57
Luciano Tajado	Pwersa ng Masang Pilipino	5,860	1.40
Jesus Lagas	Pwersa ng Masang Pilipino	5,263	1.25
Dante Dinglasa	Pwersa ng Masang Pilipino	2,727	0.65
Paterno Nano	Pwersa ng Masang Pilipino	2,165	0.52
Total		419,492	100.00
Total votes		141,146	–
Source: Commission on Elections

== Misamis Oriental ==
=== Governor ===
Term-limited incumbent Governor Oscar Moreno of Lakas–Kampi–CMD won re-election to a third term.

Candidate	Party	Votes	%
Oscar Moreno	Lakas–Kampi–CMD	253,536	73.80
Michael Angelo Paderanga	Pwersa ng Masang Pilipino	88,243	25.69
Manuel Po	Independent	1,750	0.51
Total		343,529	100.00
Valid votes		343,529	86.45
Invalid/blank votes		53,826	13.55
Total votes		397,355	100.00
Lakas–Kampi–CMD hold			
Source: Commission on Elections

=== Vice governor ===
Incumbent Vice Governor Norris Babiera of Lakas–Kampi–CMD won re-election to a second term.

Candidate	Party	Votes	%
Norris Babiera	Lakas–Kampi–CMD	164,396	56.40
Victorico Vicente Chaves Jr.	Pwersa ng Masang Pilipino	127,100	43.60
Total		291,496	100.00
Valid votes		291,496	73.36
Invalid/blank votes		105,859	26.64
Total votes		397,355	100.00
Lakas–Kampi–CMD hold			
Source: Commission on Elections

=== Provincial board ===
The Misamis Oriental Provincial Board is composed of 13 board members, 10 of whom are elected.

Party	Votes	%	Seats
Lakas–Kampi–CMD	567,641	47.06	5
Pwersa ng Masang Pilipino	478,099	39.63	3
Liberal Party	72,684	6.03	1
Nacionalista Party	70,128	5.81	1
Independent	17,711	1.47	0
Total	1,206,263	100.00	10
Total votes	397,355	–	
Source: Commission on Elections

==== 1st district ====
Candidate	Party	Votes	%
Jeremy Pelaez	Lakas–Kampi–CMD	65,915	11.91
Benedict Lagbas	Liberal Party	60,037	10.85
Jimmy Caiña	Lakas–Kampi–CMD	57,401	10.37
Jabi Bernaldez	Lakas–Kampi–CMD	57,355	10.36
Geodeguil Ursal	Pwersa ng Masang Pilipino	54,831	9.91
Cancio Nicanor Guibone	Pwersa ng Masang Pilipino	54,015	9.76
Melchor Cubillo	Pwersa ng Masang Pilipino	47,190	8.53
Michele Anayron	Pwersa ng Masang Pilipino	43,858	7.92
Teodoro Sabuga-a Jr.	Lakas–Kampi–CMD	36,660	6.62
Alfredo Caharian	Lakas–Kampi–CMD	35,976	6.50
Rico Taray	Pwersa ng Masang Pilipino	27,587	4.98
Jaime Abaarrientos	Liberal Party	12,647	2.29
Total		553,472	100.00
Total votes		174,538	–
Source: Commission on Elections

==== 2nd district ====
Candidate	Party	Votes	%
Mercy Grace Acain	Pwersa ng Masang Pilipino	82,858	12.69
Oliver Actub	Lakas–Kampi–CMD	78,301	11.99
Heckert Emano	Pwersa ng Masang Pilipino	75,975	11.64
Jesus Jardin	Nacionalista Party	70,128	10.74
Emmanuel Mugot	Lakas–Kampi–CMD	65,306	10.00
Ma Bebina Casiño	Lakas–Kampi–CMD	62,498	9.57
Santiago Sabal	Lakas–Kampi–CMD	55,960	8.57
Eduardo Ayunting	Lakas–Kampi–CMD	52,269	8.01
Nancy Madjos	Pwersa ng Masang Pilipino	50,116	7.68
Elger Cortez	Pwersa ng Masang Pilipino	41,669	6.38
Nilo Labares	Independent	13,084	2.00
Mansueto Gritan Sr.	Independent	4,627	0.71
Total		652,791	100.00
Total votes		222,817	–
Source: Commission on Elections
