= 2022 Philippine local elections in Northern Mindanao =

- May 9, 2022
- Gubernatorial elections
- 5 provincial governors and 2 city mayors
Party	Seats	+/–
Nacionalista	2	+1
PDP–Laban	2	−1
Lakas	1	+1
NUP	1	+1
PRP	1	New
This lists parties that won seats. See the complete results below.
- Vice gubernatorial elections
- 5 provincial vice governors and 2 city vice mayors
Party	Seats	+/–
PDP–Laban	3	−1
BPP	1	0
CDP	1	New
Nacionalista	1	0
PADAYN	1	+1
This lists parties that won seats. See the complete results below.
- Provincial Board elections
- 46 provincial board members and 28 city councilors
Party	Seats	+/–
PDP–Laban	22	−18
NUP	13	+12
BPP	9	0
Nacionalista	9	−4
PADAYN	8	+2
ASPIN	7	New
Lakas	3	New
CDP	2	+1
UNA	1	−1
This lists parties that won seats. See the complete results below.

The 2022 Philippine local elections in Northern Mindanao were held on May 9, 2022.

== Summary ==
=== Governors ===
Province/city	Incumbent	Incumbent's party	Winner	Winner's party	Winning margin
Bukidnon	Jose Maria Zubiri Jr.	Bukidnon Paglaum	Rogelio Neil Roque	PRP	0.72%
Cagayan de Oro (HUC)	Oscar Moreno	PROMDI	Rolando Uy	NUP	10.04%
Camiguin	Jurdin Jesus Romualdo	PDP–Laban	Xavier Jesus Romualdo	PDP–Laban	47.88%
Iligan (HUC)	Celso Regencia	PDP–Laban	Frederick Siao	Nacionalista	19.37%
Lanao del Norte	Imelda Dimaporo	PDP–Laban	Imelda Dimaporo	PDP–Laban	79.77%
Misamis Occidental	Philip Tan	LDP	Henry Oaminal	Nacionalista	43.00%
Misamis Oriental	Yevgeny Emano	Padayon Pilipino	Peter Unabia	Lakas	12.71%

=== Vice governors ===
Province/city	Incumbent	Incumbent's party	Winner	Winner's party	Winning margin
Bukidnon	Rogelio Quiño	Bukidnon Paglaum	Clive Quiño	Bukidnon Paglaum	23.58%
Cagayan de Oro (HUC)	Joaquin Uy	NUP	Jocelyn Rodriguez	CDP	27.78%
Camiguin	Rodin Romualdo	PDP–Laban	Rodin Romualdo	PDP–Laban	48.88%
Iligan (HUC)	Jemar Vera Cruz	PDP–Laban	Dodong Alemania	Nacionalista	5.80%
Lanao del Norte	Cristy Atay	PDP–Laban	Allan Lim	PDP–Laban	77.99%
Misamis Occidental	Jie-jie Almonte	Nacionalista	Rowena Gutierrez	PDP–Laban	36.45%
Misamis Oriental	Jigjag Pelaez	Padayon Pilipino	Jigjag Pelaez	Padayon Pilipino	20.52%

=== Provincial boards ===
Province/city	Seats	Party control		Composition
Province/city	Seats	Previous	Result	Composition
Bukidnon	10 elected 3 ex-officio	Bukidnon Paglaum	Bukidnon Paglaum	Bukidnon Paglaum (9); Nacionalista (1)
Cagayan de Oro (HUC)	16 elected 2 ex-officio	PDP–Laban	No majority	NUP (9); Padayon Pilipino (4); CDP (2); PDP–Laban (1)
Camiguin	6 elected 3 ex-officio	PDP–Laban	PDP–Laban	PDP–Laban (6)
Iligan (HUC)	12 elected 2 ex-officio	PDP–Laban	No majority	Nacionalista (7); PDP–Laban (3); UNA (1); NUP (1)
Lanao del Norte	10 elected 3 ex-officio	PDP–Laban	PDP–Laban	PDP–Laban (10)
Misamis Occidental	10 elected 3 ex-officio	Nacionalista	Asenso Pinoy	Asenso Pinoy (7); PDP–Laban (2); Nacionalista (1)
Misamis Oriental	10 elected 4 ex-officio	No majority	No majority	Padayon Pilipino (4); NUP (3); Lakas (3)

== Bukidnon ==
=== Governor ===
Term-limited incumbent Governor Jose Maria Zubiri Jr. of Bukidnon Paglaum ran for the House of Representatives in Bukidnon's 3rd legislative district.

Bukidnon Paglaum nominated representative Manuel Antonio Zubiri, who was defeated by representative Rogelio Neil Roque of the People's Reform Party. Three other candidates also ran for governor.

Candidate	Party	Votes	%
Rogelio Neil Roque	People's Reform Party	371,222	49.94
Manuel Antonio Zubiri	Bukidnon Paglaum	365,864	49.22
Bong Eligan	Workers' and Peasants' Party	2,300	0.31
Edgar Mabilog	Independent	1,962	0.26
Rodrigo Tero	Independent	1,918	0.26
Total		743,266	100.00
Total votes		817,990	–
Registered voters/turnout		944,838	86.57
PRP gain from BPP			
Source: Commission on Elections

=== Vice Governor ===
Incumbent Vice Governor Rogelio Quiño of Bukidnon Paglaum ran for mayor of Manolo Fortich.

Bukidnon Paglaum nominated Manolo Fortich mayor Clive Quiño, who won the election against two other candidates.

Candidate	Party	Votes	%
Clive Quiño	Bukidnon Paglaum	349,394	56.07
Dan Dangallo	Partido Federal ng Pilipinas	202,441	32.49
Lean Catarata	Partido Pederal ng Maharlika	71,317	11.44
Total		623,152	100.00
Total votes		817,990	–
Registered voters/turnout		944,838	86.57
BPP hold			
Source: Commission on Elections

=== Provincial Board ===
The Bukidnon Provincial Board is composed of 13 board members, 10 of whom are elected.

Bukidnon Paglaum won nine seats, maintaining its majority in the provincial board.

Party	Votes	%	Seats	+/–
Bukidnon Paglaum	778,579	60.79	9	0
Nacionalista Party	264,395	20.64	1	New
People's Reform Party	133,160	10.40	0	New
Liberal Party	12,248	0.96	0	0
Workers' and Peasants' Party	2,989	0.23	0	New
Independent	89,324	6.97	0	–1
Total	1,280,695	100.00	10	0
Total votes	817,990	–		
Registered voters/turnout	944,838	86.57		

==== 1st district ====
Bukidnon's 1st provincial district consists of the same area as Bukidnon's 1st legislative district. Two board members are elected from this provincial district.

Seven candidates were included in the ballot.

Candidate	Party	Votes	%
Jong Albarece (incumbent)	Bukidnon Paglaum	65,694	27.58
Larry Onahon	Bukidnon Paglaum	47,684	20.02
Carlo Rey Calingasan	Independent	46,956	19.71
Barth Onahon	People's Reform Party	31,041	13.03
Titing Quiño	People's Reform Party	21,051	8.84
Jenny Uplinger	Independent	13,548	5.69
Dokben Pancrudo	Liberal Party	12,248	5.14
Total		238,222	100.00
Total votes		180,164	–
Registered voters/turnout		205,494	87.67
Source: Commission on Elections

==== 2nd district ====
Bukidnon's 2nd provincial district consists of the same area as Bukidnon's 2nd legislative district. Three board members are elected from this provincial district.

Nine candidates were included in the ballot.

Candidate	Party	Votes	%
Hollis Monsanto	Bukidnon Paglaum	81,406	19.09
Lorenzo Dinlayan Jr. (incumbent)	Bukidnon Paglaum	81,271	19.06
Jun Beltran (incumbent)	Bukidnon Paglaum	76,633	17.97
Bobby Jay Dinlayan	Nacionalista Party	76,121	17.85
Loi Tortola	Nacionalista Party	51,051	11.97
Manny James Cudal II	Nacionalista Party	37,546	8.80
Datu Boy Damasco	Independent	17,082	4.01
Nonoy Pahayahay	Workers' and Peasants' Party	2,989	0.70
Alejandro Halina	Independent	2,346	0.55
Total		426,445	100.00
Total votes		217,793	–
Registered voters/turnout		247,814	87.89
Source: Commission on Elections

==== 3rd district ====
Bukidnon's 3rd provincial district consists of the same area as Bukidnon's 3rd legislative district. Three board members are elected from this provincial district.

Five candidates were included in the ballot.

Candidate	Party	Votes	%
Bing-bing Casinabe (incumbent)	Bukidnon Paglaum	104,136	27.01
Benito Baguio (incumbent)	Bukidnon Paglaum	100,164	25.98
Joseph Palmada (incumbent)	Bukidnon Paglaum	92,586	24.02
Gordon Torres	People's Reform Party	81,068	21.03
Jonas Cabanatan	Independent	7,522	1.95
Total		385,476	100.00
Total votes		254,258	–
Registered voters/turnout		301,841	84.24
Source: Commission on Elections

==== 4th district ====
Bukidnon's 4th provincial district consists of the same area as Bukidnon's 4th legislative district. Two board members are elected from this provincial district.

Five candidates were included in the ballot.

Candidate	Party	Votes	%
Dodong Rosal	Bukidnon Paglaum	67,402	29.24
RJ Pepito	Nacionalista Party	63,189	27.41
Rhea Rhenna Agripo	Bukidnon Paglaum	61,603	26.72
Ricah Chea Catarata	Nacionalista Party	36,488	15.83
Jenson Pamisa	Independent	1,870	0.81
Total		230,552	100.00
Total votes		165,775	–
Registered voters/turnout		189,689	87.39
Source: Commission on Elections

== Cagayan de Oro ==
=== Mayor ===
Term-limited incumbent Mayor Oscar Moreno of PROMDI ran for governor of Misamis Oriental. He was previously affiliated with PDP–Laban.

PROMDI nominated Dondon Ragasi, who was defeated by representative Rolando Uy of the National Unity Party. Former Phividec Industrial Authority administrator Pompee La Viña (Lakas–CMD) and three other candidates also ran for mayor.

Candidate	Party	Votes	%
Rolando Uy	National Unity Party	160,312	54.18
Pompee La Viña	Lakas–CMD	130,583	44.14
Dondon Ragasi	PROMDI	2,103	0.71
Felix Borres Jr. III	Independent	1,224	0.41
Glenn Ubalde	Independent	879	0.30
Vic Flores	Kilusang Bagong Lipunan	760	0.26
Total		295,861	100.00
Total votes		317,273	–
Registered voters/turnout		372,293	85.22
NUP gain from PROMDI			
Source: Commission on Elections

=== Vice Mayor ===
Incumbent Vice Mayor Joaquin Uy of the National Unity Party (NUP) ran for the House of Representatives in Cagayan de Oro's 1st legislative district. He was previously affiliated with PDP–Laban.

The NUP nominated city councilor Inday Dahino, who was defeated by city councilor Jocelyn Rodriguez of the Centrist Democratic Party.

Candidate	Party	Votes	%
Jocelyn Rodriguez	Centrist Democratic Party	178,162	63.89
Inday Dahino	National Unity Party	100,691	36.11
Total		278,853	100.00
Total votes		317,273	–
Registered voters/turnout		372,293	85.22
CDP gain from NUP			
Source: Commission on Elections

=== City Council ===
The Cagayan de Oro City Council is composed of 18 councilors, 16 of whom are elected.

The National Unity Party won nine seats, becoming the largest party in the city council.

Party	Votes	%	Seats	+/–
National Unity Party	802,490	41.81	9	New
Padayon Pilipino	355,322	18.51	4	+3
Centrist Democratic Party	238,381	12.42	2	+1
Lakas–CMD	147,751	7.70	0	New
PDP–Laban	130,492	6.80	1	–13
People's Reform Party	40,626	2.12	0	New
PROMDI	33,011	1.72	0	New
Kilusang Bagong Lipunan	9,022	0.47	0	New
Partido Pederal ng Maharlika	3,377	0.18	0	New
Independent	158,935	8.28	0	0
Total	1,919,407	100.00	16	0
Total votes	317,273	–		
Registered voters/turnout	372,293	85.22		

==== 1st district ====
Cagayan de Oro's 1st councilor district consists of the same area as Cagayan de Oro's 1st legislative district. Eight councilors are elected from this councilor district.

28 candidates were included in the ballot.

Candidate	Party	Votes	%
Aga Suan	Padayon Pilipino	73,424	7.97
Roger Abaday (incumbent)	National Unity Party	68,726	7.46
Jay Pascual (incumbent)	National Unity Party	63,747	6.92
Imee Moreno	National Unity Party	62,459	6.78
Romeo Calizo (incumbent)	National Unity Party	56,555	6.14
George Goking (incumbent)	National Unity Party	54,359	5.90
Jose Abbu Jr.	Padayon Pilipino	51,208	5.56
Bernie Esparcia	Centrist Democratic Party	49,838	5.41
Manny Darimbang	Centrist Democratic Party	49,254	5.35
Boboy Daba (incumbent)	National Unity Party	48,980	5.32
Oscar Salcedo	National Unity Party	46,976	5.10
Ferdie Miranda	National Unity Party	46,926	5.10
Alvin Calingin	Lakas–CMD	41,781	4.54
Jerry Sabanal	Padayon Pilipino	36,790	4.00
Annie Daba	Independent	33,349	3.62
Dures Fe Tagayuna	Centrist Democratic Party	32,528	3.53
Ronald Acenas	PROMDI	25,537	2.77
Abner Dalapu	Independent	21,669	2.35
Christian Beja	Independent	12,344	1.34
Willie Cuenca	PDP–Laban	9,717	1.06
Bernie Calam	Independent	9,240	1.00
Bert Amplayo	Independent	5,606	0.61
Herbert Serrano	Independent	5,070	0.55
Eldeoro Rotoras	Partido Pederal ng Maharlika	3,377	0.37
Paul Cempron	Independent	3,335	0.36
Bebskie Coronel	Independent	2,705	0.29
Rico Medija	Independent	2,616	0.28
Imelda Cultura	Independent	2,605	0.28
Total		920,721	100.00
Total votes		151,492	–
Registered voters/turnout		177,163	85.51
Source: Commission on Elections

==== 2nd district ====
Cagayan de Oro's 2nd councilor district consists of the same area as Cagayan de Oro's 2nd legislative district. Eight councilors are elected from this councilor district.

32 candidates were included in the ballot.

Candidate	Party	Votes	%
Yvy Emano	Padayon Pilipino	90,178	9.03
Malou Gaane (incumbent)	National Unity Party	72,718	7.28
Girlie Balaba (incumbent)	PDP–Laban	65,891	6.60
James Judith II	Centrist Democratic Party	64,177	6.43
Ian Mark Nacaya (incumbent)	National Unity Party	63,968	6.41
Edgar Cabanlas (incumbent)	National Unity Party	63,934	6.40
Ian Achas	Padayon Pilipino	56,970	5.70
Suzette Daba (incumbent)	National Unity Party	55,702	5.58
Jun Acenas	National Unity Party	54,440	5.45
Roger Villazorda	Lakas–CMD	53,084	5.32
Jasmin Borja	Lakas–CMD	52,886	5.30
Marlon Tabac	PDP–Laban	48,321	4.84
Anthony Abejuela	Padayon Pilipino	46,752	4.68
Pastor Andales	National Unity Party	43,000	4.31
Nixon Baban	Centrist Democratic Party	42,584	4.26
Marlon Fidel Bongay Jr.	People's Reform Party	40,626	4.07
Spencer Cailing	Independent	12,962	1.30
Domer Postrero	Kilusang Bagong Lipunan	9,022	0.90
Vic Talingting	Independent	7,172	0.72
Antonio Pontipedra	PDP–Laban	6,563	0.66
James Almonte	Independent	5,019	0.50
Philip Kenn Jaudian	Independent	4,773	0.48
Jan Michael Igot	Independent	4,519	0.45
Rustico Gabutin	Independent	4,343	0.43
Kenneth Sarenas	Independent	4,304	0.43
Tes Padla	Independent	4,056	0.41
Ronald Rufin	PROMDI	3,907	0.39
Rogelio Ibacarra	Independent	3,815	0.38
Roger Satur	Independent	3,801	0.38
Elmer Cotiamco	PROMDI	3,567	0.36
Floro Piloton Jr.	Independent	3,197	0.32
Dario Lagudas	Independent	2,435	0.24
Total		998,686	100.00
Total votes		165,781	–
Registered voters/turnout		195,130	84.96
Source: Commission on Elections

== Camiguin ==
=== Governor ===
Incumbent Governor Jurdin Jesus Romualdo of PDP–Laban ran for the House of Representatives in Camiguin's lone legislative district. He was previously affiliated with the Nationalist People's Coalition.

PDP–Laban nominated Romualdo's son, representative Xavier Jesus Romualdo, who won the election against three other candidates.

Candidate	Party	Votes	%
Xavier Jesus Romualdo	PDP–Laban	37,183	72.76
Eddy Chan	People's Reform Party	12,714	24.88
Periolo Banaag	Partido Federal ng Pilipinas	871	1.70
Senio Ebarle	Pederalismo ng Dugong Dakilang Samahan	335	0.66
Total		51,103	100.00
Total votes		55,153	–
Registered voters/turnout		64,090	86.06
PDP–Laban hold			
Source: Commission on Elections

=== Vice Governor ===
Incumbent Vice Governor Rodin Romualdo of PDP–Laban ran for a second term.

Romualdo won re-election against two other candidates.

Candidate	Party	Votes	%
Rodin Romualdo (incumbent)	PDP–Laban	35,893	71.19
Alma Concepcion Parreño	Independent	11,247	22.31
Nicky Neri	Partido Federal ng Pilipinas	3,278	6.50
Total		50,418	100.00
Total votes		55,153	–
Registered voters/turnout		64,090	86.06
PDP–Laban hold			
Source: Commission on Elections

=== Provincial Board ===
The Camiguin Provincial Board is composed of nine board members, six of whom are elected.

The PDP–Laban won six seats, maintaining its majority in the provincial board.

Party	Votes	%	Seats	+/–
PDP–Laban	101,610	79.72	6	0
People's Reform Party	4,792	3.76	0	New
Partido Federal ng Pilipinas	3,372	2.65	0	New
Independent	17,688	13.88	0	New
Total	127,462	100.00	6	0
Total votes	55,153	–		
Registered voters/turnout	64,090	86.06		

==== 1st district ====
Camiguin's 1st provincial district consists of the municipalities of Mahinog and Mambajao. Three board members are elected from this provincial district.

Six candidates were included in the ballot.

Candidate	Party	Votes	%
Shella Babanto	PDP–Laban	21,409	27.28
Marivic Jansol	PDP–Laban	20,946	26.69
Louis Bollozos	PDP–Laban	20,014	25.50
Jesus Jajalla Jr.	Independent	5,672	7.23
Henry Cutab	Independent	5,647	7.20
Virgilio Arce	Independent	4,793	6.11
Total		78,481	100.00
Total votes		32,186	–
Registered voters/turnout		36,443	88.32
Source: Commission on Elections

==== 2nd district ====
Camiguin's 2nd provincial district consists of the municipalities of Catarman, Guinsiliban and Sagay. Three board members are elected from this provincial district.

Eight candidates were included in the ballot.

Candidate	Party	Votes	%
Boyet Planco	PDP–Laban	14,220	29.03
Christina Loquias	PDP–Laban	12,627	25.78
Webb Bajenio (incumbent)	PDP–Laban	12,394	25.30
Jerry Ong	People's Reform Party	2,747	5.61
Rebeco Aboc	Partido Federal ng Pilipinas	2,546	5.20
Toping Rodriguez	People's Reform Party	2,045	4.18
Garee Bacsin	Independent	1,576	3.22
Allan Enopia	Partido Federal ng Pilipinas	826	1.69
Total		48,981	100.00
Total votes		22,967	–
Registered voters/turnout		27,647	83.07
Source: Commission on Elections

== Iligan ==
=== Mayor ===
Term-limited incumbent Mayor Celso Regencia of PDP–Laban ran for the House of Representatives in Iligan's lone legislative district.

PDP–Laban nominated Iligan vice mayor Jemar Vera Cruz, who was defeated by representative Frederick Siao of the Nacionalista Party. City councilor Tata Tamula (PROMDI) and four other candidates also ran for mayor.

Candidate	Party	Votes	%
Frederick Siao	Nacionalista Party	81,205	55.31
Jemar Vera Cruz	PDP–Laban	52,766	35.94
Tata Tamula	PROMDI	6,296	4.29
Leo Zaragoza	Partido para sa Demokratikong Reporma	4,888	3.33
Alberto Ong Jr.	Independent	820	0.56
Angel Cruz	Independent	624	0.43
Manuel Battung Jr.	Independent	219	0.15
Total		146,818	100.00
Total votes		154,734	–
Registered voters/turnout		185,452	83.44
Nacionalista gain from PDP–Laban			
Source: Commission on Elections

=== Vice Mayor ===
Term-limited incumbent Vice Mayor Jemar Vera Cruz of PDP–Laban ran for mayor of Iligan.

PDP–Laban nominated city councilor Ian Uy, who was defeated by Dodong Alemania of the Nacionalista Party. Two other candidates also ran for vice mayor.

Candidate	Party	Votes	%
Dodong Alemania	Nacionalista Party	69,424	49.18
Ian Uy	PDP–Laban	61,239	43.38
Bong Magallanes	PROMDI	7,973	5.65
Jun Visaya	Partido para sa Demokratikong Reporma	2,534	1.79
Total		141,170	100.00
Total votes		154,734	–
Registered voters/turnout		185,452	83.44
Nacionalista gain from PDP–Laban			
Source: Commission on Elections

=== City Council ===
The Iligan City Council is composed of 14 councilors, 12 of whom are elected.

48 candidates were included in the ballot.

The Nacionalista Party won seven seats, becoming the largest party in the city council.

Party	Votes	%	Seats	+/–
Nacionalista Party	623,432	40.43	7	+4
PDP–Laban	588,698	38.17	3	–5
United Nationalist Alliance	73,595	4.77	1	0
National Unity Party	70,672	4.58	1	New
PROMDI	66,358	4.30	0	New
Partido para sa Demokratikong Reporma	33,438	2.17	0	New
Independent	85,986	5.58	0	0
Total	1,542,179	100.00	12	0
Total votes	154,734	–		
Registered voters/turnout	185,452	83.44		

Candidate	Party	Votes	%
Tete Pacaña	Nacionalista Party	78,202	5.07
Pisyong Larrazabal (incumbent)	United Nationalist Alliance	73,595	4.77
Queenie Belmonte (incumbent)	National Unity Party	70,672	4.58
Michelle Sweet (incumbent)	Nacionalista Party	70,367	4.56
Samuel Huertas	Nacionalista Party	69,388	4.50
Bong Abragan	Nacionalista Party	65,690	4.26
Jake Balanay (incumbent)	PDP–Laban	65,147	4.22
Ryan Ong (incumbent)	PDP–Laban	64,932	4.21
Marlene Young	Nacionalista Party	62,811	4.07
Ramil Emborong	Nacionalista Party	59,932	3.89
Betsy Zalsos	Nacionalista Party	58,551	3.80
Nhicole Capangpangan	PDP–Laban	57,407	3.72
Eric Capitan	Nacionalista Party	55,917	3.63
Sol Bacsarpa (incumbent)	PDP–Laban	55,225	3.58
Demy Plando (incumbent)	PDP–Laban	53,171	3.45
Rene Orbe	Nacionalista Party	52,744	3.42
Esay Minaga	Nacionalista Party	49,830	3.23
Noli Pardillo (incumbent)	PDP–Laban	47,137	3.06
Ralph Vincent Gerona	PDP–Laban	47,057	3.05
Titin Ancis	PDP–Laban	43,774	2.84
Jun Bacus	PDP–Laban	41,831	2.71
Richard Veloso	PDP–Laban	38,166	2.47
Bobby Tabimina	PDP–Laban	37,479	2.43
Ed Prospero	PDP–Laban	37,372	2.42
Cocoy Sabarre	Independent	23,453	1.52
Reggie Punongbayan	Independent	18,802	1.22
Butch Abellanosa	Independent	18,186	1.18
Teodoro Gayo Jr.	PROMDI	11,973	0.78
Clint Galan	PROMDI	10,005	0.65
Joel Jumawan	Partido para sa Demokratikong Reporma	9,888	0.64
Seano Actub	PROMDI	8,896	0.58
Albert Cabili	PROMDI	8,093	0.52
James Aberilla Jr.	PROMDI	6,667	0.43
Edward Chan Blaza	PROMDI	6,627	0.43
Rolando Bado	Partido para sa Demokratikong Reporma	6,621	0.43
Dominic Carillo	Independent	6,050	0.39
Rey Manzanero	PROMDI	5,687	0.37
Dean Noel Benegrado	Partido para sa Demokratikong Reporma	5,493	0.36
Walter Lubguban	Partido para sa Demokratikong Reporma	4,776	0.31
Roger Suminguit	Partido para sa Demokratikong Reporma	4,759	0.31
Eduardo Loyola	PROMDI	4,337	0.28
Sonny Taping	Independent	4,178	0.27
Sherwel Mancio	PROMDI	4,073	0.26
Aldrich Sabac	Independent	4,047	0.26
Alvin Galorio	Independent	3,934	0.26
Marion Suerte	Independent	2,834	0.18
Michael Coleto	Independent	2,515	0.16
Danilo Galleto	Independent	1,987	0.13
Rab Bonto	Partido para sa Demokratikong Reporma	1,901	0.12
Total		1,542,179	100.00
Total votes		154,734	–
Registered voters/turnout		185,452	83.44
Source: Commission on Elections

== Lanao del Norte ==
=== Governor ===
Incumbent Governor Imelda Dimaporo of PDP–Laban ran for a third term.

Dimaporo won re-election against two other candidates.

Candidate	Party	Votes	%
Imelda Dimaporo (incumbent)	PDP–Laban	248,583	89.53
Amer Nagamura Moner Sr.	Partido Federal ng Pilipinas	27,091	9.76
Boy Umpa	Independent	1,975	0.71
Total		277,649	100.00
Total votes		319,742	–
Registered voters/turnout		391,564	81.66
PDP–Laban hold			
Source: Commission on Elections

=== Vice Governor ===
Term-limited incumbent Vice Governor Cristy Atay of PDP–Laban ran for the Lanao del Norte Provincial Board in the 2nd provincial district.

PDP–Laban nominated provincial board member Allan Lim, who won against two other candidates.

Candidate	Party	Votes	%
Allan Lim	PDP–Laban	204,314	86.98
Okboy Pasandalan	Partido Federal ng Pilipinas	21,113	8.99
Melodina Cantalejo	Independent	9,470	4.03
Total		234,897	100.00
Total votes		319,742	–
Registered voters/turnout		391,564	81.66
PDP–Laban hold			
Source: Commission on Elections

=== Provincial Board ===
The Lanao del Norte Provincial Board is composed of 13 board members, 10 of whom are elected.

PDP–Laban won 10 seats, maintaining its majority in the provincial board.

Party	Votes	%	Seats	+/–
PDP–Laban	749,282	76.09	10	+1
Partido Federal ng Pilipinas	179,460	18.22	0	0
Independent	55,978	5.68	0	–1
Total	984,720	100.00	10	0
Total votes	319,742	–		
Registered voters/turnout	391,564	81.66		

==== 1st district ====
Lanao del Norte's 1st provincial district consists of the same area as Lanao del Norte's 1st legislative district. Five board members are elected from this provincial district.

11 candidates were included in the ballot.

Candidate	Party	Votes	%
Grecille Matalines	PDP–Laban	67,146	16.10
Dick Dibaratun	PDP–Laban	64,453	15.46
Reinario Bihag (incumbent)	PDP–Laban	59,465	14.26
Eleuterio Obial Jr. (incumbent)	PDP–Laban	54,176	12.99
Marivic Ramos	PDP–Laban	53,991	12.95
Casimero Bagol (incumbent)	Independent	48,955	11.74
Nagz Moner	Partido Federal ng Pilipinas	17,127	4.11
Soler Garlan	Partido Federal ng Pilipinas	15,921	3.82
Silvestre dela Torre	Partido Federal ng Pilipinas	13,467	3.23
Sacar Mutia	Partido Federal ng Pilipinas	12,804	3.07
Alejandro Batalo	Partido Federal ng Pilipinas	9,518	2.28
Total		417,023	100.00
Total votes		144,783	–
Registered voters/turnout		180,628	80.16
Source: Commission on Elections

==== 2nd district ====
Lanao del Norte's 2nd provincial district consists of the same area as Lanao del Norte's 2nd legislative district. Five board members are elected from this provincial district.

11 candidates were included in the ballot.

Candidate	Party	Votes	%
Cristy Atay	PDP–Laban	102,411	18.04
Achmad Taha (incumbent)	PDP–Laban	92,431	16.28
Superman Usop Jr.	PDP–Laban	91,924	16.19
Haron Omar Jr.	PDP–Laban	88,645	15.61
Abdany Buanding	PDP–Laban	74,640	13.15
Noska Abdulrahman	Partido Federal ng Pilipinas	30,196	5.32
Eting Omandam	Partido Federal ng Pilipinas	22,460	3.96
Caridad Tatoy	Partido Federal ng Pilipinas	21,315	3.75
Melchor Zaragoza	Partido Federal ng Pilipinas	20,387	3.59
Cristino Enricoso	Partido Federal ng Pilipinas	16,265	2.87
Nel de Garcia	Independent	7,023	1.24
Total		567,697	100.00
Total votes		174,959	–
Registered voters/turnout		210,936	82.94
Source: Commission on Elections

== Misamis Occidental ==
=== Governor ===
Incumbent Governor Philip Tan of Laban ng Demokratikong Pilipino ran for a second term. He was previously affiliated with the Nacionalista Party.

Tan was defeated by representative Henry Oaminal of the Nacionalista Party. Bibiano Salvanera (Independent) also ran for governor.

Candidate	Party	Votes	%
Henry Oaminal	Nacionalista Party	242,083	71.27
Philip Tan (incumbent)	Laban ng Demokratikong Pilipino	96,024	28.27
Bibiano Salvanera	Independent	1,577	0.46
Total		339,684	100.00
Total votes		370,071	–
Registered voters/turnout		434,832	85.11
Nacionalista gain from LDP			
Source: Commission on Elections

=== Vice Governor ===
Term-limited incumbent Jie-jie Almonte of the Nacionalista Party ran for vice mayor of Oroquieta.

Rowena Gutierrez of PDP–Laban won the election against former board member Richard Centino (National Unity Party) and Alfredo Conol (Partido Federal ng Pilipinas). Rowena Gutierrez was the substitute to her husband, former Lopez Jaena mayor Michael Gutierrez, a candidate for vice governor who died on December 27, 2021, after being shot at a Christmas party.

Candidate	Party	Votes	%
Rowena Gutierrez	PDP–Laban	202,431	67.19
Richard Centino	National Unity Party	92,624	30.74
Alfredo Conol	Partido Federal ng Pilipinas	6,226	2.07
Total		301,281	100.00
Total votes		370,071	–
Registered voters/turnout		434,832	85.11
Nacionalista gain from LDP			
Source: Commission on Elections

=== Provincial Board ===
The Misamis Occidental Provincial Board is composed of 13 board members, 10 of whom are elected.

Asenso Pinoy won seven seats, gaining a majority in the provincial board.

Party	Votes	%	Seats	+/–
Asenso Pinoy	634,500	52.61	7	New
PDP–Laban	209,596	17.38	2	+2
National Unity Party	129,799	10.76	0	0
Nacionalista Party	102,647	8.51	1	–9
Laban ng Demokratikong Pilipino	76,590	6.35	0	New
Partido Federal ng Pilipinas	26,379	2.19	0	0
Partido para sa Demokratikong Reporma	15,214	1.26	0	New
PROMDI	5,511	0.46	0	New
Independent	5,796	0.48	0	0
Total	1,206,032	100.00	10	0
Total votes	370,071	–		
Registered voters/turnout	434,832	85.11		

==== 1st district ====
Misamis Occidental's 1st provincial district consists of the same area as Misamis Occidental's 1st legislative district. Five board members are elected from this provincial district.

Nine candidates were included in the ballot.

Candidate	Party	Votes	%
Alex Guantero	Asenso Pinoy	90,862	17.91
Winston Catane (incumbent)	Asenso Pinoy	85,784	16.91
Tata Paylaga-Lim (incumbent)	Asenso Pinoy	85,337	16.82
Donna Iyog	Asenso Pinoy	84,315	16.62
Agnes Villanueva (incumbent)	Asenso Pinoy	80,864	15.94
Nesty Gonzales	National Unity Party	33,408	6.59
Carl Zafra	National Unity Party	33,119	6.53
Eelre Limpahan	Partido Federal ng Pilipinas	7,786	1.53
Arlyn Ann Bangga	Independent	5,796	1.14
Total		507,271	100.00
Total votes		169,444	–
Registered voters/turnout		202,347	83.74
Source: Commission on Elections

==== 2nd district ====
Misamis Occidental's 2nd provincial district consists of the same area as Misamis Occidental's 2nd legislative district. Five board members are elected from this provincial district.

15 candidates were included in the ballot.

Candidate	Party	Votes	%
Calven Decina (incumbent)	PDP–Laban	107,059	15.32
Nemesio Lahaylahay (incumbent)	Asenso Pinoy	104,368	14.94
Tata Cebedo	Asenso Pinoy	102,970	14.74
Heinjie Estaño (incumbent)	Nacionalista Party	102,647	14.69
Jerry Cuizon	PDP–Laban	102,537	14.67
Mel Navarro	National Unity Party	36,313	5.20
Ada Gomez	National Unity Party	26,959	3.86
Frank Candia	Laban ng Demokratikong Pilipino	26,314	3.77
Nida Lee	Laban ng Demokratikong Pilipino	25,263	3.62
Doming Elemento	Laban ng Demokratikong Pilipino	25,013	3.58
Presli Deles	Partido para sa Demokratikong Reporma	15,214	2.18
Ron Saquin	Partido Federal ng Pilipinas	10,869	1.56
Mario Castro	Partido Federal ng Pilipinas	7,724	1.11
Arman Anuada	PROMDI	2,815	0.40
Mhar Undag	PROMDI	2,696	0.39
Total		698,761	100.00
Total votes		200,627	–
Registered voters/turnout		232,485	86.30
Source: Commission on Elections

== Misamis Oriental ==
=== Governor ===
Term-limited incumbent Governor Yevgeny Emano of Padayon Pilipino ran for the House of Representatives in Misamis Oriental's 2nd legislative district.

Emano endorsed Gingoog vice mayor Peter Unabia (Lakas–CMD) won the election against representative Juliette Uy (National Unity Party), Cagayan de Oro mayor Oscar Moreno (PROMDI) and three other candidates.

Candidate	Party	Votes	%
Peter Unabia	Lakas–CMD	248,859	47.37
Juliette Uy	National Unity Party	182,130	34.66
Oscar Moreno	PROMDI	89,404	17.02
Cynthia Mary Magallanes	Independent	2,205	0.42
Manuel Po	Independent	1,559	0.30
Ellen Sabuero	Independent	1,249	0.24
Total		525,406	100.00
Total votes		585,181	–
Registered voters/turnout		667,416	87.68
Lakas gain from Padayon Pilipino			
Source: Commission on Elections

=== Vice Governor ===
Incumbent Vice Governor Jigjag Pelaez of Padayon Pilipino ran for a second term. He was previously affiliated with the United Nationalist Alliance.

Pelaez won re-election against his brother, former Misamis Oriental vice governor Joey Pelaez (United Nationalist Alliance), and two other candidates.

Candidate	Party	Votes	%
Jigjag Pelaez (incumbent)	Padayon Pilipino	251,042	53.26
Joey Pelaez	United Nationalist Alliance	154,314	32.74
Ayi Hernandez	PROMDI	61,897	13.13
Leonardo Bingcoy	Partido Demokratiko Sosyalista ng Pilipinas	4,094	0.87
Total		471,347	100.00
Total votes		585,181	–
Registered voters/turnout		667,416	87.68
Padayon Pilipino hold			
Source: Commission on Elections

=== Provincial Board ===
The Misamis Oriental Provincial Board is composed of 14 board members, 10 of whom are elected

Padayon Pilipino won four seats, remaining as the largest party in the provincial board.

Party	Votes	%	Seats	+/–
National Unity Party	632,763	33.72	3	+2
Padayon Pilipino	588,967	31.38	4	–1
PROMDI	260,331	13.87	0	New
Lakas–CMD	258,199	13.76	3	New
Katipunan ng Nagkakaisang Pilipino	38,223	2.04	0	New
Aksyon Demokratiko	26,351	1.40	0	New
PDP–Laban	13,827	0.74	0	–3
Independent	58,021	3.09	0	0
Total	1,876,682	100.00	10	0
Total votes	585,181	–		
Registered voters/turnout	667,416	87.68		

==== 1st district ====
Misamis Oriental's 1st provincial district consists of the same area as Misamis Oriental's 1st legislative district. Five board members are elected from this provincial district.

18 candidates were included in the ballot.

Candidate	Party	Votes	%
Win Militante (incumbent)	Padayon Pilipino	106,924	13.51
Marlon Kho	Lakas–CMD	91,158	11.52
Rey Buhisan	Lakas–CMD	85,819	10.84
Erik Khu (incumbent)	Lakas–CMD	81,222	10.26
Jabi Bernaldez	National Unity Party	57,679	7.29
Hardrock Bernales	National Unity Party	56,719	7.17
April Vosotros	National Unity Party	49,906	6.31
Mayet Abogado	PROMDI	45,280	5.72
Maloy Khu	Katipunan ng Nagkakaisang Pilipino	38,223	4.83
Eliza Mae Lagbas	Independent	31,105	3.93
Junbals Baldivino	PROMDI	30,690	3.88
William Cabana	PROMDI	28,831	3.64
Bong Buot	National Unity Party	22,924	2.90
Art Sumanpan	National Unity Party	20,427	2.58
Dan Dan Jamolin	PROMDI	18,643	2.36
Richard Rejas	PDP–Laban	13,827	1.75
Mark Sumastre	Independent	6,256	0.79
Pastor Salarda	Independent	5,829	0.74
Total		791,462	100.00
Total votes		252,300	–
Registered voters/turnout		289,032	87.29
Source: Commission on Elections

==== 2nd district ====
Misamis Oriental's 2nd provincial district consists of the same area as Misamis Oriental's 2nd legislative district. Five board members are elected from this provincial district.

18 candidates were included in the ballot.

Candidate	Party	Votes	%
Say-say Emano (incumbent)	Padayon Pilipino	149,216	13.75
Boboy Sabal (incumbent)	Padayon Pilipino	123,761	11.40
Dexter Yasay (incumbent)	Padayon Pilipino	121,394	11.19
Princess Emano	National Unity Party	103,442	9.53
Pangky Acain	National Unity Party	93,553	8.62
Leoncio Abejo	Padayon Pilipino	87,672	8.08
Jessa Mugot (incumbent)	National Unity Party	82,235	7.58
Boris Olivier Actub	National Unity Party	81,063	7.47
Angel Lim Jr.	National Unity Party	64,815	5.97
Oliver Ubaub	PROMDI	39,491	3.64
Jardin Jesus	PROMDI	35,458	3.27
Fermin Jarales	Aksyon Demokratiko	26,351	2.43
Cel Casiño-Rivera	PROMDI	22,619	2.08
Felixberto Macasarte	PROMDI	18,638	1.72
Dodong Benavidez	PROMDI	15,549	1.43
Mar Zayas	Independent	10,290	0.95
Dorwin Lajot	PROMDI	5,132	0.47
Edie Llanita	Independent	4,541	0.42
Total		1,085,220	100.00
Total votes		332,881	–
Registered voters/turnout		378,384	87.97
Source: Commission on Elections
