= Asenso Pinoy Party =

Political party in the Philippines

Asenso Pinoy
- Founder: Henry Oaminal
- Founded: 2021; 5 years ago
- Colors: Orange Yellow
- Slogan: Asenso Kabataang Pilipino! Asenso Pamilya! Asenso para sa Bawat Pilipino! (transl. Progress (of the) Filipino Youth! Progress (of) Families! Progress for Every Filipino!)
- Senate: 0 / 24
- House of Representatives: 1 / 64 (Party-list seats)
- Provincial Governors: 1 / 82
- Provincial Vice Governors: 1 / 82
- Provincial Board Members: 10 / 840

Website
- Official Facebook page

The Asenso Pinoy Party is a political party in the Philippines. It was founded in 2021 by then-Misamis Occidental 2nd district representative Henry Oaminal Sr. The party has been represented in the Philippine House of Representatives since 2025 through its party-list representative, Henry Oaminal Jr., and represents Filipino youth and families.

== History ==
The party was founded in 2021 by representative Henry Oaminal Sr., who later successfully ran for governor of Misamis Occidental in 2022. It narrowly failed to secure representation in the party-list election for the House of Representatives that year, placing second among the parties that did not win a seat, behind Akbayan, the last party-list to secure representation.

In 2025, Oaminal's son, Henry Jr., was the party's first nominee for the party-list election, in which Asenso Pilipino placed 24th among the 57 winning party-lists and won one seat in the House of Representatives. One candidate for vice governor, Rowena Gutierrez of Misamis Occidental, was elected, along with ten provincial board members running under Asenso Pinoy.

== Electoral performance ==
=== Party-list elections ===
| Election | Votes | % | Secured seats | Party-list seats | Congress | 1st representative | 2nd representative | 3rd representative |
|---|---|---|---|---|---|---|---|---|
| 2022 | 232,229 | 0.64% | 0 / 3 | 63 | 19th Congress; 2022–2025 | —N/a | —N/a | —N/a |
| 2025 | 423,133 | 1.07% | 1 / 3 | 64 | 20th Congress; 2025–2028 | Henry Oaminal Jr. | —N/a | —N/a |
Note: A party-list group can win a maximum of three seats in the House of Representatives.

== Elected members ==
=== Governors ===
Provincial governors of Asenso Pinoy in 2026
| Name | Province | Took office |
|---|---|---|
| Henry Oaminal Sr. (Note: Party founder Henry Oaminal Sr. ran under the Nacionalista Party in the 2022 and 2025 elections.) | Misamis Occidental | June 30, 2022 |

=== Vice governors ===
Provincial vice governors of Asenso Pinoy in 2026
| Name | Province | Took office |
|---|---|---|
| Rowena Gutierrez | Misamis Occidental | June 30, 2022 |
