= Asenso Pinoy =

Asenso Pinoy may refer to:

- Asenso Pinoy (TV show), a Philippine television infotainment show aired from 2005 to 2024
- Asenso Pinoy Party, a Philippine political party founded in 2021
