= Philip Tan (politician) =

Filipino politician

The Honorable Philip Tan

Governor of Misamis Occidental
- In office June 30, 2019 – June 30, 2022
- Vice Governor: Aurora Virginia "Jie-Jie" M. Almonte
- Preceded by: Herminia M. Ramiro
- Succeeded by: Atty. Henry S. Oaminal

Mayor of Tangub
- In office June 30, 2010 – June 30, 2019
- President: Benigno Aquino III; Rodrigo Duterte
- Preceded by: Jeniffer W. Tan
- Succeeded by: Jennifer W. Tan
- In office June 30, 1992 – June 30, 2001
- President: Fidel Ramos; Joseph Estrada; Gloria Macapagal Arroyo
- Preceded by: Eleno Regidor Jr.
- Succeeded by: Jennifer W. Tan

Personal details
- Born: Misamis Occidental, Philippines
- Party: LDP (2021–present)
- Other political affiliations: Nacionalista (2018–2021); Liberal (2015–2018); NUP (2012–2015); Lakas (2009–2012)
- Spouse: Jennifer Wee
- Occupation: Lawyer, Certified Public Accountant, Politician, and Businessman

Philip Tiu Tan is a Filipino politician from the province of Misamis Occidental in the Philippines. He is the former Governor of Misamis Occidental, serving from 2019 to 2022. He also served as the mayor of Tangub from 2010 to 2019, and previously from 1992 to 2001.

== See also ==
- Panguil Bay Bridge
