= Mahinog =

Municipality in Camiguin, Philippines

- Municipality
- Municipality of Mahinog
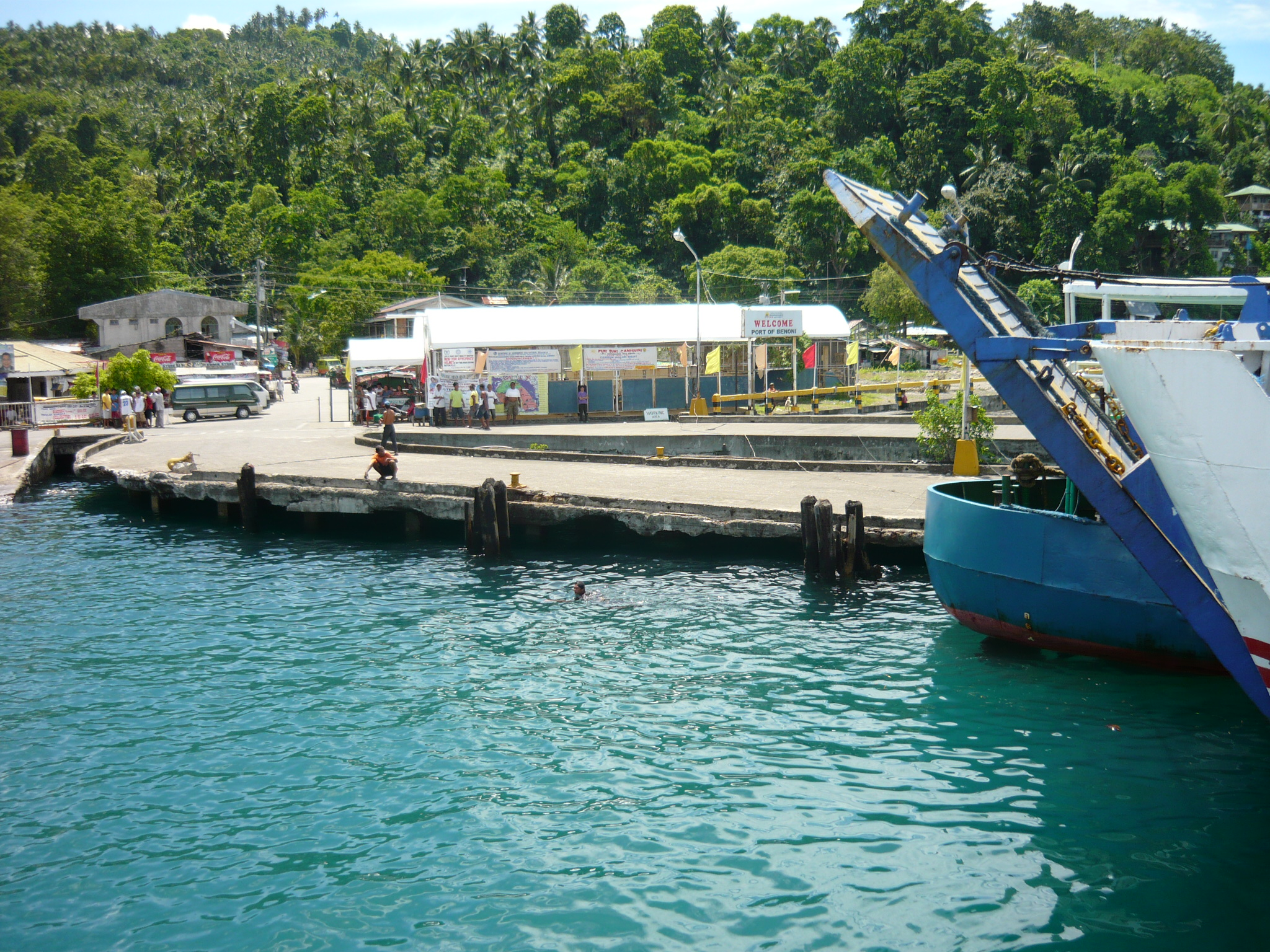
- Port of Benoni

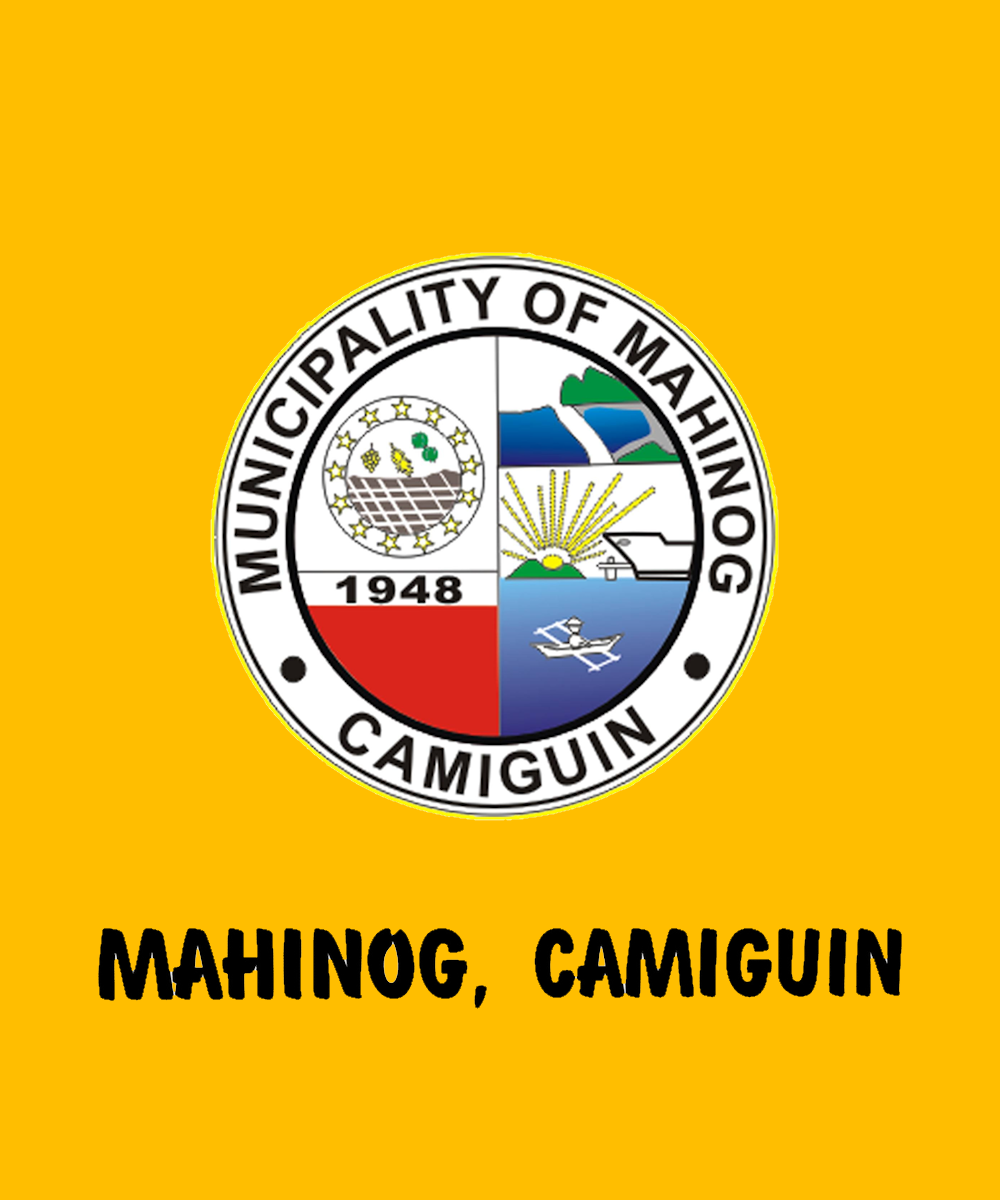
- Flag

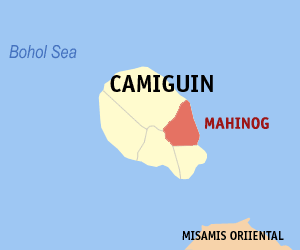
- Map of Camiguin with Mahinog highlighted
- Interactive map of Mahinog
- Location within the Philippines
- Coordinates: 9°09′N 124°47′E
- Country: Philippines
- Region: Northern Mindanao
- Province: Camiguin
- District: Lone district
- Founded: September 14, 1869
- Chartered: July 1, 1948
- Barangays: 13 (see Barangays)

Government
  - Type: Sangguniang Bayan
  - Mayor: Rey Lawrence K. Tan (PDPLBN)
  - Vice Mayor: Nerio Y. Galochino (PDPLBN)
  - Representative: Jurdin Jesus M. Romualdo
  - Municipal Council: Members: Neoleda Clara P. Salon; Maida O. Pacuribot; Fe Rachel U. Tabamo-Lumbay; Kindred C. Jajalla; Rosie D. Dewetes; Ramil L. Bayucot; Nilo R. Salcedo; Kaiser A. Abao
  - Electorate: 10,919 voters (2025)

Area
  - Total: 32.55 km^{2} (12.57 sq mi)
- Elevation: 47 m (154 ft)
- Highest elevation: 1,625 m (5,331 ft)
- Lowest elevation: 0 m (0 ft)

Population (2024 census)
  - Total: 14,905
  - Density: 457.9/km^{2} (1,186/sq mi)
  - Households: 3,502

Economy
  - Income class: 4th municipal income class
  - Poverty incidence: 17.88% (2023)
  - Revenue: ₱ 131.8 million (2024)
  - Assets: ₱ 306.9 million (2024)
  - Expenditure: ₱ 123.8 million (2024)
  - Liabilities: ₱ 80.45 million (2024)

Service provider
  - Electricity: Camiguin Electric Cooperative (CAMELCO)
- Time zone: UTC+8 (PST)
- ZIP code: 9101
- PSGC: 1001803000
- IDD : area code: +63 (0)88
- Native languages: Kinamigin; Cebuano; Tagalog
- Website: www.mahinogcamiguin.gov.ph

Mahinog, officially the Municipality of Mahinog, is a municipality in the province of Camiguin, Philippines. According to the 2024 census, it has a population of 14,905 people.

== Geography ==
=== Barangays ===
Mahinog is politically subdivided into 13 barangays. Each barangay consists of puroks while some have sitios.

- Benoni
- Binatubo (Binaliwan)
- Catohugan
- Hubangon
- Owakan
- Poblacion
- Puntod
- San Isidro
- San Jose
- San Miguel
- San Roque
- Tubod
- Tupsan Pequeño

=== Climate ===
Climate data for Mahinog, Camiguin
Month	Jan	Feb	Mar	Apr	May	Jun	Jul	Aug	Sep	Oct	Nov	Dec	Year
Mean daily maximum °C (°F)	28 (82)	28 (82)	29 (84)	30 (86)	30 (86)	30 (86)	29 (84)	30 (86)	30 (86)	29 (84)	29 (84)	28 (82)	29 (84)
Mean daily minimum °C (°F)	23 (73)	23 (73)	23 (73)	23 (73)	25 (77)	25 (77)	25 (77)	25 (77)	25 (77)	25 (77)	24 (75)	24 (75)	24 (75)
Average precipitation mm (inches)	327 (12.9)	254 (10.0)	185 (7.3)	128 (5.0)	215 (8.5)	273 (10.7)	248 (9.8)	243 (9.6)	214 (8.4)	246 (9.7)	271 (10.7)	271 (10.7)	2,875 (113.3)
Average rainy days	24.3	21.1	22.5	20.6	28.3	28.8	29.4	29.0	28.0	28.3	26.0	24.2	310.5
Source: Meteoblue

== Demographics ==
Population census of Mahinog
Year	Pop.	±% p.a.
1903	5,727	—
1948	9,500	+1.13%
1960	7,719	−1.71%
1970	8,999	+1.54%
1980	9,993	+1.05%
1990	11,313	+1.25%
1995	11,351	+0.06%
2000	12,592	+2.25%
2007	13,168	+0.62%
2010	13,531	+0.99%
2015	14,038	+0.70%
2020	14,634	+0.88%
2024	14,905	+0.44%
Source: Philippine Statistics Authority

In the 2024 census, the population of Mahinog was 14,905 people, with a density of 460 inhabitants per square kilometre or 1,200 inhabitants per square mile.

== Economy ==
Poverty incidence of Mahinog (%)

Source: Philippine Statistics Authority
