= Henry Oaminal =

Filipino politician (born 1958)

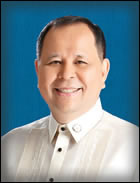
- Official portrait, 2013

Governor of Misamis Occidental
- Incumbent
- Assumed office June 30, 2022
- Vice Governor: Rowena Gutierrez
- Preceded by: Philip T. Tan

Member of the Philippine House of Representatives from Misamis Occidental's 2nd District
- In office June 30, 2013 – June 30, 2022
- Preceded by: Loreto Leo S. Ocampos
- Succeeded by: Sancho Fernando F. Oaminal

Deputy Speaker of the House of Representatives
- In office July 29, 2019 – June 1, 2022 Serving with several others

Vice Governor of Misamis Occidental
- In office June 30, 2010 – June 30, 2013
- Governor: Herminia M. Ramiro
- Preceded by: Francisco T. Paylaga Jr.
- Succeeded by: Aurora Virginia M. Almonte

Member of the Misamis Occidental Provincial Board
- In office June 30, 2007 – June 30, 2010
- Governor: Loreto Leo S. Ocampos

Personal details
- Born: Henry Sevilla Oaminal; October 11, 1958 (age 67) Clarin, Misamis Occidental, Philippines
- Party: Nacionalista (2007–2017; 2019–present); Asenso Pinoy (2024–present)
- Other political affiliations: PDP (2017–2019)
- Spouse: Pearl Grace F. Oaminal (m. 1988)
- Children: Althea Isobel; Henry Jr. Sancho Fernando
- Occupation: Politician, lawyer, entrepreneur
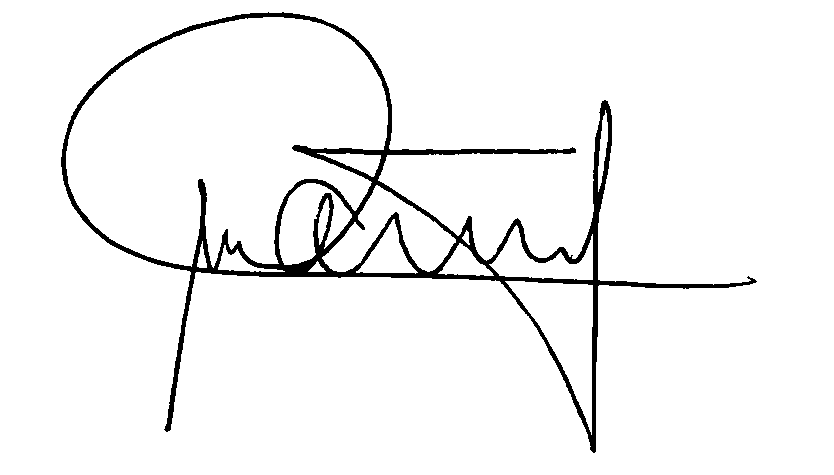
- Signature

Henry Sevilla Oaminal Sr. (born October 11, 1958) is a Filipino politician, lawyer, and businessman serving as the governor of Misamis Occidental since 2022. He was the Representative of Misamis Occidental's 2nd district from 2013 to 2022 and was a House Deputy Speaker from 2019 to 2022.

== Political career ==
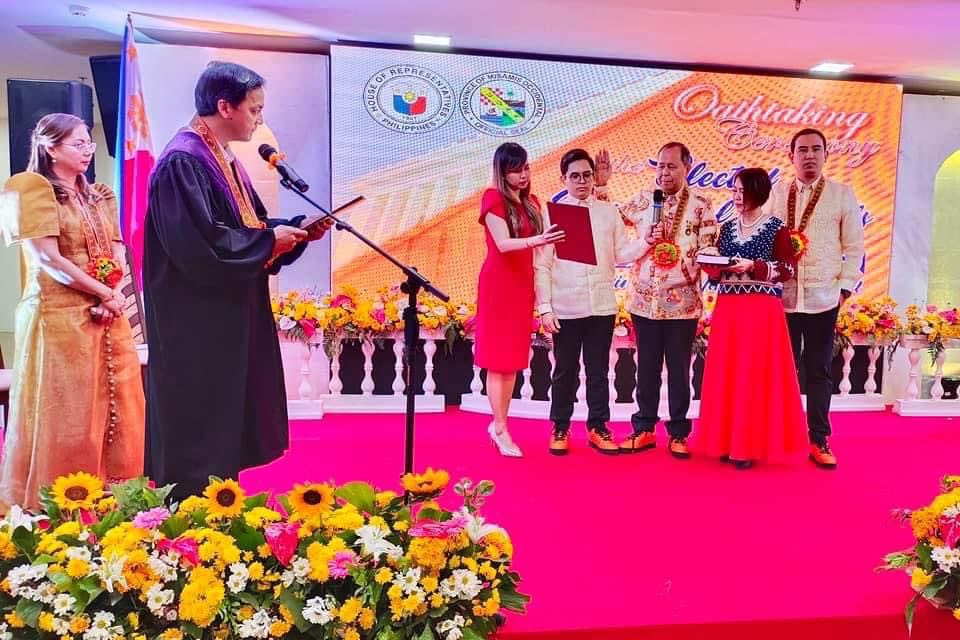
Oaminal being sworn in by Supreme Court Associate Justice Midas Marquez as Misamis Occidental governor in 2022.

On July 10, 2020, Oaminal was one of the 70 representatives who voted to reject the franchise renewal of ABS-CBN.

== Controversies ==
=== Lam-an housing project ===
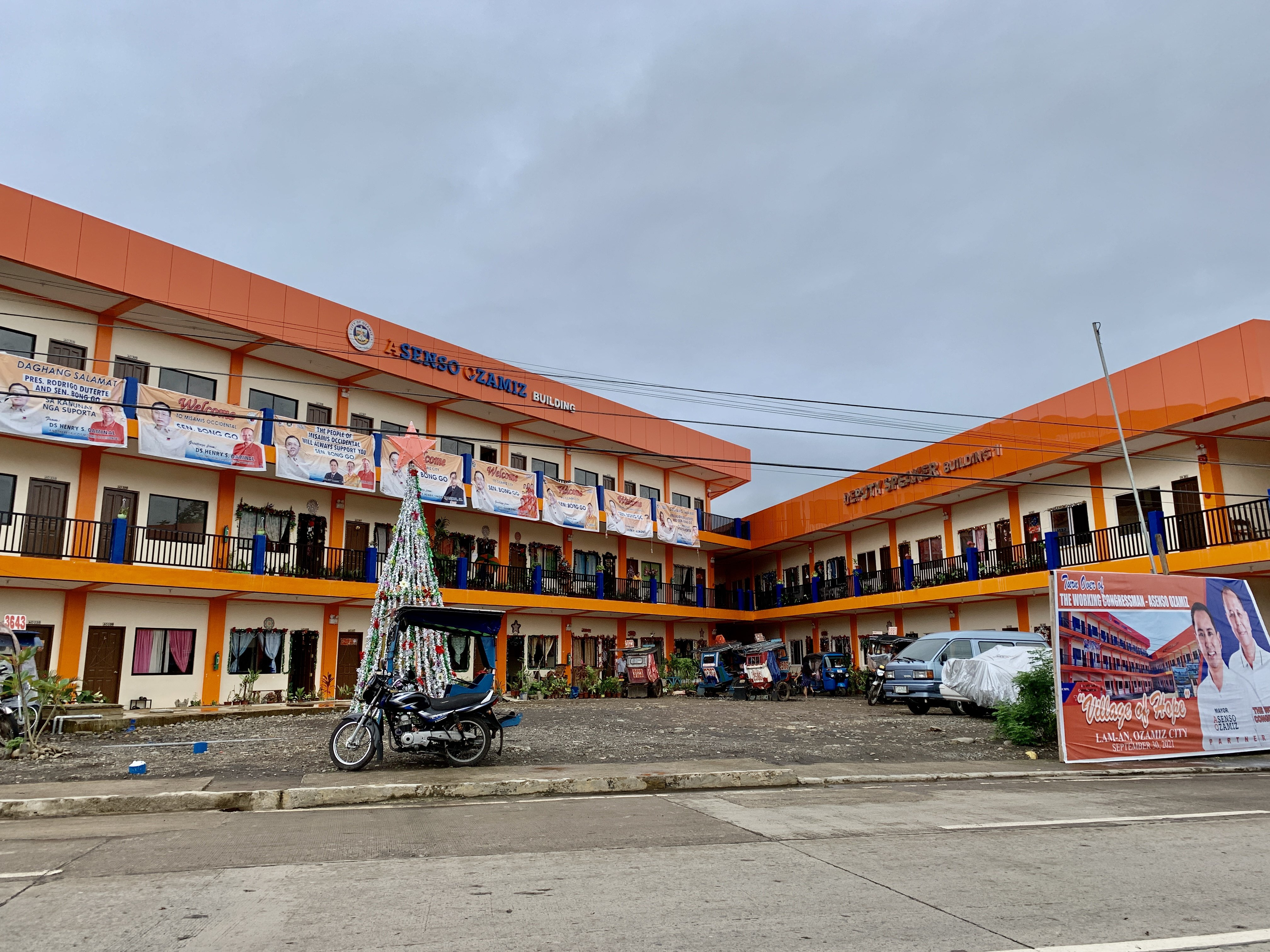
The "Village of Hope" housing for informal settlers in Ozamiz City

In early 2020, at least five houses were demolished in Barangay Lam-an, Ozamiz to make way for a free housing project for informal settlers. Longtime homes and landowners complained about 'harassment' and believed that the eviction lacked legal basis. Families were allegedly threatened to leave and 'pack up' by their barangay captain, councilor, and Oaminal himself. Oaminal debunked this claim saying that their family was always 'observant of the rule of law'.

Rodante Marcoleta, party-list representative of SAGIP, called on to have Oaminal investigated by the Committee on Ethics and the Committee on Good Government and Public Accountability for his alleged involvement in the illegal demolition for the Lam-an housing project. Marcoleta pointed out that the Neri family has a valid title to the property where their property stood. He pointed out that the construction of a housing project on private property is a violation of R.A. 7279 otherwise known as the 'Urban Development and Housing Act of 1992'.

House Speaker Lord Allan Velasco ordered hearings to stop. Oaminal was given 3 weeks to compensate the affected families.

=== DPWH corruption allegations ===
In 2020, Oaminal was included in the list of 9 lawmakers who were allegedly involved in corruption related to infrastructure projects. He said that the report from the Presidential Anti-Corruption Commission is 'not a condemnation or indictment' and should 'not be taken as the gospel of truth'. He says he supports the anti-graft campaign of President Rodrigo Duterte.

=== House session attendance despite positive COVID-19 test ===
Oaminal attended the opening session of the House of Representatives on July 26, 2021, despite testing positive in a COVID-19 test taken on the day before President Rodrigo Duterte's sixth State of the Nation Address, breaking the isolation rules set by the Department of Health. Oaminal said he received his antigen in the evening before the SONA. He said he was immediately scheduled to get tested for COVID-19 in a lab. His sample was taken at 12:10 AM and he received his negative results at 5:15 AM before the SONA.

=== PNB case ===
In 2021, the Supreme Court granted the petition of Philippine National Bank, overturning the decision of the Court of Appeals on June 1, 2015. PNB's petition seeks to revive criminal charges against Oaminal for six bouncing checks worth P12,797,767.20 in 2002. The court has directed the second branch of the Municipal Court in Ozamiz City to resume the trial on G.R. No. 219325 for six counts of violation of Batas Pambansa (PB) Bilang 22, otherwise known as the Bouncing Checks Law.

=== Assassination attempt ===
On 15 October 2023, Oaminal survived an IED attack on his convoy in Clarin, Misamis Occidental.

== See also ==
- House of Representatives of the Philippines
- 2022 Philippine gubernatorial elections
- Ozamiz City
