= Camiguin Provincial Board =

Legislative body of the province of Camiguin, Philippines

Camiguin Provincial Board Sangguniang Panlalawigan ng Camiguin

Type
- Type: Unicameral
- Term limits: 3 terms (9 years)

Leadership
- Presiding Officer: Rodin M. Romualdo, PFP since June 30, 2019

Structure
- Seats: 11 board members 1 ex officio presiding officer
- Political groups: PFP (6) Independent (2) TBD (1) Nonpartisan (2)
- Length of term: 3 years
- Authority: Local Government Code of the Philippines

Elections
- Voting system: Plurality-at-large (regular members); Indirect election (ex officio members)
- Last election: May 12, 2025
- Next election: May 15, 2028

Meeting place
- Camiguin Sangguniang Panlalawigan Building, Mambajao

The Camiguin Provincial Board is the Sangguniang Panlalawigan (provincial legislature) of the Philippine province of Camiguin.

The members are elected via plurality-at-large voting: the province is divided into two districts, each having three seats. A voter votes up to three names, with the top three candidates per district being elected. The vice governor is the ex officio presiding officer, and only votes to break ties. The vice governor is elected via the plurality voting system province-wide.

The districts used in appropriation of members are not coextensive with the legislative district of Camiguin; unlike congressional representation which is at-large, Camiguin is divided into two districts for representation in the Sangguniang Panlalawigan.

Aside from the regular members, the board also includes the provincial federation presidents of the Liga ng mga Barangay (ABC, from its old name "Association of Barangay Captains"), the Sangguniang Kabataan (SK, youth councils) and the Philippine Councilors League (PCL).

== Apportionment ==
Elections	Seats per district		Ex officio seats	Total seats
Elections	1st	2nd	Ex officio seats	Total seats
2010–2025	3	3	3	9
2025-Present	5	3	3	11

== List of members ==
=== Current members ===
These are the members after the 2025 local elections and 2023 barangay and SK elections:

- Vice Governor: Rodin M. Romualdo (PFP)

Seat	Board member	Party	Start of term	End of term
1st district	Shella G. Babanto	PFP	June 30, 2022	June 30, 2028
1st district	Ma. Victoria J. Jansol	PFP	June 30, 2022	June 30, 2028
1st district	Louis G. Bollozos	PFP	June 30, 2022	June 30, 2028
1st district	Carlo C. Borromeo	Independent	June 30, 2025	June 30, 2028
1st district	Lourdes P. Mendoza-Gamutan	Independent	June 30, 2025	June 30, 2028
2nd district	Stanley K. Planco	PFP	June 30, 2022	June 30, 2028
2nd district	Christina T. Loquias	PFP	June 30, 2022	June 30, 2028
2nd district	Webb I. Bajenio	PFP	June 30, 2019	June 30, 2028
ABC	Jaime A. Mestrado	Nonpartisan	July 30, 2018	January 1, 2023
PCL	TBD			June 30, 2028
SK	Lucile Salvani	Nonpartisan	June 8, 2018	January 1, 2023

=== Vice Governor ===
Election year	Name	Party	Ref.
2016	James A. Ederango	Liberal	
2019	Rodin M. Romualdo	PDP–Laban	
2022	Rodin M. Romualdo	PDP–Laban	
2025	Rodin M. Romualdo	PFP	

=== 1st District ===
- Population (2024):

Election year	Member (party)	Member (party)	Member (party)	Member (party)	Member (party)	Ref.
2016	Rodin M. Romualdo (Liberal)	Nerio Y. Galochino (Liberal)	Miguel L. Ibahay (Liberal)	—		
2019	Placido Oclarit (PDP–Laban)	Nerio Y. Galochino (PDP–Laban)	Miguel L. Ibahay (PDP–Laban)	—		
2022	Shella G. Babanto (PDP–Laban)	Ma. Victoria J. Jansol (PDP–Laban)	Louis G. Bollozos (PDP–Laban)	—		
2025	Shella G. Babanto (PFP)	Ma. Victoria J. Jansol (PFP)	Louis G. Bollozos (PFP)	Carlo C. Borromeo (Independent)	Lourdes P. Mendoza-Gamutan (Independent)	

=== 2nd District ===
- Population (2024):

Election year	Member (party)	Member (party)	Member (party)	Ref.
2016	Rony N. Sagocsoc (Liberal)	Jose Rufino B. Ladao (Liberal)	Virgilio F. Lacerna (Liberal)	
2019	Rony N. Sagocsoc (PDP–Laban)	Jose Rufino B. Ladao (PDP–Laban)	Webb I. Bajenio (PDP–Laban)	
2022	Stanley K. Planco (PDP–Laban)	Christina T. Loquias (PDP–Laban)	Webb I. Bajenio (PDP–Laban)	
2025	Stanley K. Planco (PFP)	Christina T. Loquias (PFP)	Webb I. Bajenio (PFP)	
