= Lanao del Norte Provincial Board =

Legislative body of the province of Lanao del Norte, Philippines

Lanao del Norte Provincial Board Sangguniang Panlalawigan ng Lanao del Norte

Type
- Type: Unicameral
- Term limits: 3 terms (9 years)

Leadership
- Presiding Officer: Allan J. Lim, Lakas-CMD since June 30, 2022

Structure
- Seats: 13 board members 1 ex officio presiding officer
- Political groups: Lakas-CMD (7) UNLAD (3) TBD (1) Nonpartisan (3)
- Length of term: 3 years
- Authority: Local Government Code of the Philippines

Elections
- Voting system: Multiple non-transferable vote (regular members); Indirect election (ex officio members)
- Last election: May 12, 2025
- Next election: May 15, 2028

Meeting place
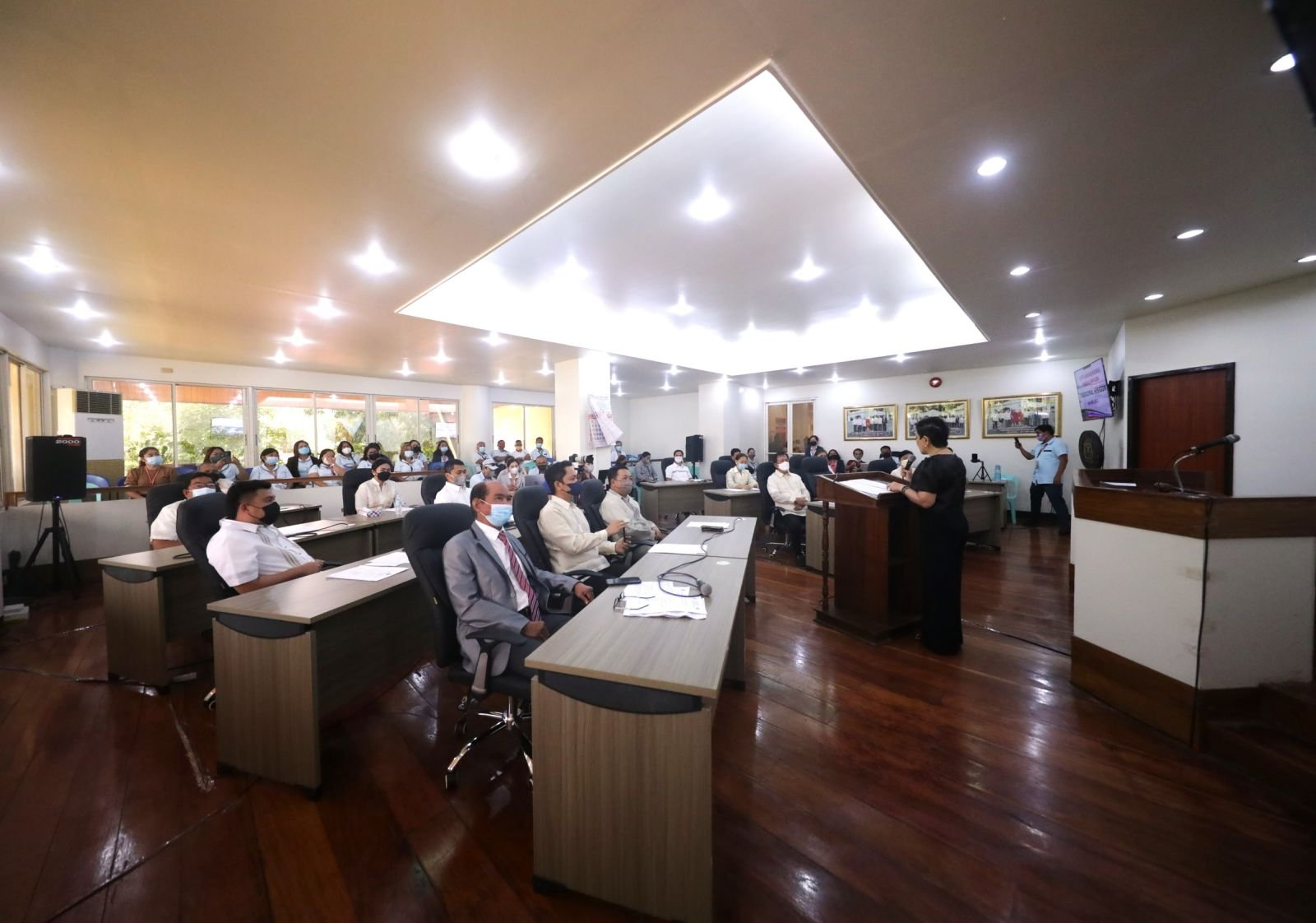
- Lanao del Norte Provincial Capitol, Tubod

The Lanao del Norte Provincial Board is the Sangguniang Panlalawigan (provincial legislature) of the Philippine province of Lanao del Norte.

The members are elected via plurality-at-large voting: the province is divided into two districts, each having five seats. A voter votes up to five names, with the top five candidates per district being elected. The vice governor is the ex officio presiding officer, and only votes to break ties. The vice governor is elected via the plurality voting system province-wide.

The districts used in appropriation of members is coextensive with the legislative districts of Lanao del Norte.

Aside from the regular members, the board also includes the provincial federation presidents of the Liga ng mga Barangay (ABC, from its old name "Association of Barangay Captains"), the Sangguniang Kabataan (SK, youth councils) and the Philippine Councilors League (PCL).

== Apportionment ==
Elections	Seats per district		Ex officio seats	Total seats
Elections	1st	2nd	Ex officio seats	Total seats
2010–present	5	5	3	13

== List of members ==
=== Current members ===
These are the members after the 2025 local elections and 2023 barangay and SK elections:

- Vice Governor: Allan J. Lim (Lakas)

Seat	Board member	Party	Start of term	End of term
1st district	Grecille I. Matalines	Lakas	June 30, 2022	June 30, 2028
1st district	Sidick M. Dibaratun	Lakas	June 30, 2022	June 30, 2028
1st district	Bob C. Andot	Lakas	June 30, 2025	June 30, 2028
1st district	Eleuterio M. Obial Jr.	Lakas	June 30, 2019	June 30, 2028
1st district	Setty Deamila C. Macarambon	UNLAD	June 30, 2025	June 30, 2028
2nd district	Ma. Cristina N. Atay	Lakas	June 30, 2022	June 30, 2028
2nd district	Afsalur L. Malawani	Lakas	June 30, 2025	June 30, 2028
2nd district	Maida A. Tawantawan	UNLAD	June 30, 2025	June 30, 2028
2nd district	Superman B. Usop Jr.	UNLAD	June 30, 2019	June 30, 2028
2nd district	Abdany C. Buanding	Lakas	June 30, 2022	June 30, 2028
ABC	Genesis Tura	Nonpartisan	July 30, 2018	January 1, 2023
PCL	TBD			June 30, 2028
SK	Rheca Macabangon	Nonpartisan	November 2023	December 2025

=== Vice governor ===
Election year	Name	Party	Ref.
2016	Maria Cristina N. Atay	Liberal	
2019	Maria Cristina N. Atay	PDP–Laban	
2022	Allan J. Lim	PDP–Laban	
2025	Allan J. Lim	Lakas	

=== 1st district ===
- Population (2024):

Election year	Member (party)	Member (party)	Member (party)	Member (party)	Member (party)	Ref.
2016	Grecille I. Matalines (Liberal)	Macarupung B. Dibaratun (Liberal)	Mohammad Moamar Jack S. Maruhom (Liberal)	Reinario B. Bihag (Liberal)	Marivic D. Ramos (Liberal)	
2019	Casimero C. Bagol (PDP–Laban)	Macarupung B. Dibaratun (PDP–Laban)	Eleuterio M. Obial, Jr. (PDP–Laban)	Reinario B. Bihag (PDP–Laban)	Marivic D. Ramos (PDP–Laban)	
2022	Grecille I. Matalines (PDP–Laban)	Sidick M. Dibaratun (PDP–Laban)	Eleuterio M. Obial, Jr. (PDP–Laban)	Reinario B. Bihag (PDP–Laban)	Marivic D. Ramos (PDP–Laban)	
2025	Grecille I. Matalines (Lakas)	Sidick M. Dibaratun (Lakas)	Eleuterio M. Obial, Jr. (Lakas)	Bob C. Andot (Lakas)	Setty Deamila C. Macarambon; UNLAD	

=== 2nd district ===
- Population (2024):

Election year	Member (party)	Member (party)	Member (party)	Member (party)	Member (party)	Ref.
2016	Cesar Q. Yap, Jr. (Liberal)	Superman A. Usop (Liberal)	Abdul Harris U. Ali (Liberal)	Tawantawan M. Cauntongan (Liberal)	Ronda M. Maruhom (Liberal)	
2019	Allan J. Lim (PDP–Laban)	Superman A. Usop (PDP–Laban)	Abdul Harris U. Ali (PDP–Laban)	Maida A. Tawantawan (PDP–Laban)	Achmad B. Taha (PDP–Laban)	
2022	Maria Cristina N. Atay (PDP–Laban)	Superman A. Usop (PDP–Laban)	Haron B. Omar, Jr. (PDP–Laban)	Abdany C. Buanding (PDP–Laban)	Achmad B. Taha (PDP–Laban)	
2025	Maria Cristina N. Atay (Lakas)	Superman A. Usop; UNLAD	Afsalur L. Malawani (Lakas)	Maida A. Tawantawan; UNLAD	Abdany C. Buanding (Lakas)	
