= Governor of Misamis Occidental =

Local chief executive

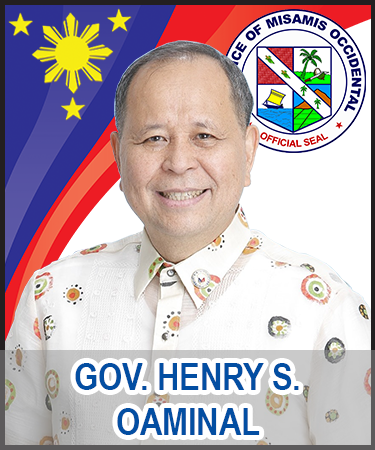
- Incumbent; Henry Oaminal since June 30, 2022
- Appointer: Elected via popular vote
- Term length: 3 years
- Inaugural holder: José Ozámiz
- Formation: 1929

The governor of Misamis Occidental (Filipino: Punong Panlalawigan ng Misamis Occidental), is the chief executive of the provincial government of Misamis Occidental. The governor holds office at the Misamis Occidental Provincial Capitol. Like all local government heads in the Philippines, the governor is elected via popular vote, and may not be elected for a fourth consecutive term (although the former governor may return to office after an interval of one term). In case of death, resignation or incapacity, the vice governor becomes the governor.

== Misamis Province (District of Cebu) ==
Governor	Term	Note	Ref.
Major José Caraballo	1874–1876		
Lt. Col. Leopoldo Roldán	1877–1883		
Lt. Col. Alberto Bacaj	1883–1884		
Lt. Col. Luis Huertas	1884–1886		
Lt. Col. Conde de Turealta	1886–1887	Served in an acting position.	
Lt. Col. Federico Tianta	1887—1888		
Major Juan Zanón	1888–1890		
Lt. Col. José de Tógores	1890–1893		
Lt. Col. Juan de Frats	1893–1894		
Capt. Ricardo Carmecerno	1895–1896		
Lt. Col. Jose de Tógores	1895–1896		
Lt. Col. Cristóbal de Aguilar	1896–1898		
Cayetano Pacana	1898–1899	Served as gobernadorcillo.	
José Roa y Casas	1899–1900	Served as Provincial President.	

== Undivided Misamis Province ==
Governor	Term	Ref.
Manuel Roa Corrales	1901–1905	
Apolinar Velez	1906–1909	
Ricardo Reyes Barrientos	1910–1912	
Jose Reyes Barrientos	1912–1916	
Isidro Rillas	1917–1919	
Juan Valdeconcha Roa	1920–1922	
Segundo Gaston	1923–1925	
Don Gregorio A. Pelaez	1926-1929	

== Province of Misamis Occidental ==
No.	Governor	Portrait	Term	Notes	Ref.
	José F. Ozámiz		1929-1931	Ozámiz was first appointed to the position. He would later go on to become the representative of the province's lone district and then a member of the Senate of the Philippines.	
	Anselmo L. Bernad		1931-1940		
	Porfirio G. Villarin		1940-1944		
	Angel N. Medina Sr.		1945-1950		
	Gedeon G. Quijano		1946-1954	A physician by trade, Quijano was appointed governor by President Manuel Roxas in 1946.	
	Diego T. Deling		1955-1958		
	Gedeon G. Quijano		1959-1964 (Note: Sources claim that Quijano served as governor until 1967, while Regalado began serving as governor after Quijano in 1964. Therefore, a conflict of dates arose.)	Quijano was re-elected governor for a non-consecutive term in 1959.	
	Henry Y. Regalado		1964-1978	Regalado was an engineer by profession before entering politics in 1964. During his governorship, he was appointed as a member of the Batasang Bayan for Region X (1976-1978).	
	Maximo R. Fernandez		1978-1979		
	Fortunato M. Sagrado		1979-1986		
	Alfonso D. Tan		1986-1987		
	Gorgonio F. Buaquiña		1987		
1	William L. Chiongbian		1987-1992	A shipping magnate by trade, Chiongbian served as a member of the House of Representatives for the province's at-large district (1953-1962; 1965-1972) prior to the governorship.	
2	Benito P. Chiongbian		1992-1995		
3	Florencio L. Garcia		1995-1998	Garcia served as vice governor under Governor William Chiongbian.	
4	Ernie D. Clarete		1998-2001	Clarete served as municipal mayor of Plaridel from 1986 until his eventual election as governor in 1998.	
5	Loreto Leo S. Ocampos		2001-2010	Ocampos first served as a provincial board member (1995-1998), and vice governor (1998-2001) before his election as governor.	
6	Herminia M. Ramiro		2010-2019	Ramiro served as a member of the House of Representatives for the province's 2nd district (1995-1998; 2001-2010) prior to the governorship.	
7	Philip T. Tan		2019-2022	Tan served as mayor of Tangub (1992-2001; 2010-2019) prior to the governorship.	
8	Henry S. Oaminal Sr.		2022-present	Oaminal served as a member of the House of Representatives for the province's 2nd district (2013-2022) prior to the governorship.	
