= List of members of the House of Representatives of the Philippines (B) =

This is a complete list of past and present members of the House of Representatives of the Philippines whose last names begin with the letter B.

This list also includes members of the Philippine Assembly (1907–1916), the Commonwealth National Assembly (1935–1941), the Second Republic National Assembly (1943–1944) and the Batasang Pambansa (1978–1986).

== Ba ==
- Numeriano Babao, member for Batangas's 2nd district (1949–1961)
- Leonardo Babasa Jr., member for Zamboanga del Sur's 2nd district (2019–2022)
- Natalio Bacalso, member for Region VII (1978–1984)
- Antonio Bacaltos, member for Cebu's 1st district (1987–1992)
- Rodolfo Bacani, member for Manila's 4th district (1998–2007)
- Augusto Baculio, member for Misamis Oriental's 2nd district (1998–2007)
- Pedro Baculio, member for Misamis Oriental (1946–1949)
- Alipio Cirilo Badelles, Lanao del Norte's 1st district (1998–2007)
- Laurentino Badelles, member for Lanao (1957–1961), and Lanao del Norte (1961–1965)
- Mariano Badelles Sr., member for Lanao del Norte's 1st district (1987–1998)
- Anacleto Badoy Jr., member for Region XII (1978–1984)
- Juan Baes, member for Laguna's 2nd district (1949–1951)
- Kaka Bag-ao, member for Akbayan party-list (2010–2013), and Dinagat Islands (2013–2019, 2025–present)
- Tomas Baga Jr., member for Region XII (1978–1984), and Cotabato (1984–1986)
- Catalina Bagasina, member for ALE party-list (2010–2013)
- Amado Bagatsing, member for Manila's 5th district (1987–1998, 2007–2016)
- Cristal Bagatsing, member for Manila's 5th district (2016–2022)
- Ramon Bagatsing, member for Manila's 3rd district (1957–1965, 1969–1972)
- Ramon Bagatsing Jr., member for Manila's 4th district (1987–1998)
- Teddy Baguilat, member for Ifugao (2010–2019)
- Celso Baguio, member for Camarines Sur's 2nd district (1992–1995)
- Florencio Bagwan, member for Mountain Province (1943–1944)
- Naealla Rose Bainto-Aguinaldo, member for Bahay party-list (2019–2022)
- Luz Cleta Bakunawa, member for Masbate's 2nd district (1987–1998)
- Datu Sinsuat Balabaran, member for Cotabato (1935–1938)
- Pangalian Balindong, member for Lanao del Sur's 2nd district (1995–2001, 2007–2016)
- Yasser Balindong, member for Lanao del Sur's 2nd district (2019–present)
- Eladio Balite, member for Samar's 1st district (1955–1967)
- Joaquin Balmori, member for Pangasinan's 4th district (1909–1912)
- Eugenio Baltao, member for Nueva Ecija's 1st district (1957–1969)
- Florencio Baltazar, member for La Union's 2nd district (1912–1916)
- Rodolfo Baltazar, member for La Union's 2nd district (1931–1934)
- Aquilino Banaag, member for Pangasinan's 2nd district (1916–1919)
- Leovigildo Banaag, member for Agusan del Norte's 1st district (1998–2007)
- Marlo Bancoro, member for Zamboanga Sibugay's 1st district (2025–present)
- Gregorio Bañaga, member for Tarlac's 1st district (1922–1925, 1928–1931)
- Rufino Bañas, member for South Cotabato (1984–1986)
- Shirlyn Bañas-Nograles, member for South Cotabato's 1st district (2019–2022), and General Santos (2025–present)
- Jorge Banal, member for Quezon City's 3rd district (2010–2019)
- Alawadin Bandon Jr., member for Tawi-Tawi (1987–1990)
- Pedro Bandoquillo, member for Negros Oriental's 1st district (1949–1953)
- Francisco Bangoy, member for Mindanao and Sulu (1931–1934)
- Manuel Banson, member for Bataan (1925–1928)
- Eugenio Angelo Barba, member for Ilocos Norte's 2nd district (2019–present)
- Arturo Maria Carmelo Barbero, member for Abra (1984–1986)
- Carmelo Barbero, member for Abra (1965–1972)
- Ace Barbers, member for Surigao del Norte's 2nd district (1998–2007, 2016–2025)
- Bernadette Barbers, member for Surigao del Norte's 2nd district (2025–present)
- Robert Barbers, member for Surigao del Norte's 2nd district (1992–1996)
- Catherine Barcelona-Reyes, member for Camarines Norte's 1st district (2013–2016)
- Roseller Barinaga, member for Zamboanga del Norte's 2nd district (1998–2007)
- Julienne Baronda, member for Iloilo City (2019–present)
- Marciano Barrera, member for Tarlac's 2nd district (1909–1912)
- Alberto Barretto, member for Zambales (1907–1911)
- Eduardo Barretto, member for Laguna's 1st district (1946–1949)
- Vicente Barsana, member for Batanes (1911–1916)
- Elpidio Barzaga Jr., member for Cavite's 2nd district (2007–2010), and Cavite's 4th district (2010–2016, 2019–2024)
- Jenny Barzaga, member for Cavite's 4th district (2016–2019, 2026–present)
- Kiko Barzaga, member for Cavite's 4th district (2025–2026)
- Ernesto Bascon, member for Cebu's 3rd district (1965–1969)
- Alex Bascug, member for Agusan del Sur (1998–2001)
- Alfel Bascug, member for Agusan del Sur's 1st district (2019–present)
- Leopoldo Bataoil, member for Pangasinan's 2nd district (2010–2019)
- Salacnib Baterina, member for Region I (1978–1984), Ilocos Sur (1984–1986), and Ilocos Sur's 1st district (1998–2007)
- Rodel Batocabe, member for Ako Bicol party-list (2010–2018)
- Lorna Bautista-Bandigan, member for Davao Occidental (2016–2022)
- Claudine Bautista-Lim, member for DUMPER PTDA party-list (2019–present)
- Basilio Bautista, member for Rizal's 1st district (1925–1928)
- Benjamin Bautista Sr., member for Region IX (1978–1984), and Davao del Sur's 2nd district (1987–1998)
- Claude Bautista, member for Davao del Sur's 2nd district (2001–2007), and Davao Occidental (2022–present)
- Franklin Bautista, Davao del Sur's 2nd district (1998–2001, 2007–2016)
- Felix Bautista, member for Pampanga (1943–1944)
- Jesus Bautista, member for Laguna (1943–1944)
- Johanne Monich Bautista, member for Trabaho party-list (2025–present)
- Cirilo Bayaya Jr., member for Leyte's 4th district (1928–1934)
- Flores Bayot, sectoral member (1984–1986)
- Rolando Bayot, sectoral member (1978–1984)

== Be ==
- Gaudencio Beduya, member for Cebu's 4th district (1969–1972)
- Eleanor Begtang, member for Apayao (2010–2019, 2022–present)
- Salvador Belaro Jr., member for 1-Ang Edukasyon party-list (2016–2019)
- Julian Belen, member for Albay's 1st district (1928–1931)
- Prospero Bello, member for Region II (1978–1984), and Isabela (1984–1986)
- Silvestre Bello III, member for 1-BAP party-list (2013–2016)
- Walden Bello, member for Akbayan party-list (2009–2015)
- Feliciano Belmonte Jr., member for Quezon City's 4th district (1992–2001, 2010–2019)
- Gabriel Belmonte, member for Nueva Ecija's 2nd district (1945–1946)
- Kit Belmonte, member for Quezon City's 6th district (2013–2022)
- Ricardo Belmonte Jr., member for Serbisyo sa Bayan party-list (2016–2019)
- Vicente Belmonte Jr., member for Lanao del Norte's 1st district (2007–2010), and Iligan (2010–2016)
- Antonio Belo, member for Capiz's 1st district (1916–1919)
- Enrique Belo, member for Capiz (1984–1986)
- Crispin Beltran, member for Bayan Muna party-list (2001–2004), and Anakpawis party-list (2004–2008)
- Ferdinand Beltran, member for Magbubukid party-list (2025–present)
- Natalio Beltran Jr., member for Romblon (1984–1986, 1987–1992)
- Pascual Beltran, member for Pangasinan's 3rd district (1945–1949)
- Benjo Benaldo, member for Cagayan de Oro's 1st district (2010–2013)
- Teodoro Benedicto, member for Region VI (1978–1984)
- Antonio Bengson, member for Pangasinan's 1st district (1919–1922)
- Antonio Bengson III, member for Pangasinan's 2nd district (1987–1992, 1995–1998)
- Jose Bengzon, member for Pangasinan's 1st district (1945–1946), and Region IV (1978–1984)
- Mario Bengzon, member for Pangasinan's 1st district (1953–1957)
- Albee Benitez, member for Negros Occidental's 3rd district (2010–2019), and Bacolod (2025–present)
- Eulogio Benitez, member for Laguna's 2nd district (1919–1922)
- Helena Benitez, member for Region IV-A (1978–1984), and Cavite (1984–1986)
- Javi Benitez, member for Negros Occidental's 3rd district (2025–present)
- Jose Conrado Benitez, member for Region IV (1978–1984), and Pasay (1984–1986)
- Jose Francisco Benitez, member for Negros Occidental's 3rd district (2019–2024)
- Datu Benito, member for Mindanao and Sulu (1917–1919)
- Justino Benito, member for Pangasinan's 5th district (1953–1957)
- Napoleon Beratio, member for Cavite's 3rd district (1998–2002)
- Manuel Bernabe, member for Rizal's 1st district (1928–1931)
- Anselmo Bernad, member for Misamis's 2nd district (1922–1925)
- Rudolfo Bernardez, member for Abra (1987–1992)
- Felicita Bernardino, member for Region III (1978–1984)
- Esteban Bernido, member for Bohol's 3rd district (1949–1957)
- Ching Bernos, member for Abra (2022–2025), and Solid North party-list (2025–present)
- Joseph Bernos, member for Abra (2016–2022, 2025–present)
- Joy Bernos, member for Abra (2010–2016)
- Luis Bersamin Jr., member for Abra (2001–2006)
- Aniceto Bertiz III, member for ACTS-OFW party-list (2016–2019)

== Bi ==
- Rodolfo Biazon, member for Muntinlupa (2010–2016)
- Ruffy Biazon, member for Muntinlupa (2001–2010, 2016–2022)
- Al Francis Bichara, member for Albay's 3rd district (1992–1995), and Albay's 2nd district (2007–2016)
- Jose Bico, sectoral member (1984–1986)
- Tawi Billones, member for Capiz's 1st district (2016–2025)
- Miguel Binag, member for Isabela's 1st district (1919–1922)
- Isabelo Binamira, member for Albay's 1st district (1945–1946)
- Abigail Binay, member for Makati's 2nd district (2007–2016)
- Braeden John Biron, member for Iloilo's 4th district (2019–2022)
- Ferjenel Biron, member for Iloilo's 4th district (2004–2013, 2016–2019, 2022–present)
- Hernan Biron Jr., member for Iloilo's 4th district (2013–2016)
- Lupo Biteng, member for Ilocos Sur's 2nd district (1922–1928)

== Bo ==
- Juan Bocar, member for Samar's 3rd district (1935–1941)
- Daniel Bocobo, member for Taguig's 2nd district (2025–present)
- Cesar Bolaños, member for Quezon (1984–1986)
- Caloy Bolilia, member for Batangas's 4th district (2025–present)
- Lianda Bolilia, member for Batangas's 4th district (2016–2025)
- Marcelo Boncan, member for Tayabas's 2nd district (1928–1931)
- Juan Bondad, member for Mountain Province's 1st district (1953–1957)
- Anna York Bondoc, member for Pampanga's 4th district (2004–2013, 2022–present)
- Emigdio Bondoc, member for Pampanga's 4th district (1992–1997)
- Juan Pablo Bondoc, member for Pampanga's 4th district (1998–2004, 2013–2022)
- Guillermo Bongolan, member for Nueva Vizcaya (1938–1941, 1943–1944)
- Jil Bongalon, member for Ako Bicol party-list (2022–2025)
- Arsenio Bonifacio, member for Laguna's 2nd district (1928–1934, 1935–1938)
- Trisha Bonoan-David, member for Manila's 4th district (2007–2016)
- Jose Bonto, member for Albay's 1st district (1935–1941)
- Julio Borbon, member for Ilocos Sur's 3rd district (1912–1916)
- Pablo Borbon, member for Batangas's 2nd district (1916–1919)
- Gabriel Bordado, member for Camarines Sur's 3rd district (2016–2025)
- Candelario Borja, member for Bohol's 1st district (1907–1916)
- Venice Borja-Agana, member for Bohol's 1st district (1987–1998)
- Arturo Borjal, sectoral member (1989–1992)
- Juan Borra, member for Iloilo's 5th district (1945–1949)
- Gregorio Borromeo, member for Misamis's 1st district (1916–1919)
- Leon Borromeo, member for Misamis's 1st district (1909–1916), and Misamis Oriental (1935–1938)
- Bonifacio Bosita, member for 1-Rider party-list (2022–2025)
- Eutiquio Boyles, member for Bohol's 3rd district (1907–1912)

== Br ==
- Cirilo Braganza, member for Pangasinan's 1st district (1909–1912)
- Enrique Braganza, member for Pangasinan's 1st district (1925–1928)
- Hernani Braganza, member for Pangasinan's 1st district (1995–2001)
- Anthony Bravo, member for Coop-NATCCO party-list (2013–2019)
- Maria Vida Bravo, member for Masbate's 1st district (2013–2019)
- Narciso Bravo Jr., member for Masbate's 1st district (2004–2013, 2019–2022)
- Adolfo Brillantes, member for Abra (1922–1925)
- Juan Brillantes, member for Abra (1943–1944)
- Sixto Brillantes, member for Ilocos Sur's 2nd district (1935–1938)
- Silvino Brimbuela, member for Albay's 2nd district (1909–1912)
- Arturo Brion, member for Laguna (1984–1986)
- Jose Briones, member for Cebu's 2nd district (1961–1969)
- Manuel Briones, member for Cebu's 1st district (1919–1931)
- Nicanor Briones, member for AGAP party-list (2007–2016, 2022–present)
- Rolando Briones, member for Pasay (1998–2001)
- Salvador Britanico, member for Region VI (1978–1984), Iloilo (1984–1986), and Banat party-list (2009–2010)
- Arlene Brosas, member for Gabriela party-list (2016–2025)

== Bu ==
- Bernardo Buenafe, member for Nueva Vizcaya (1935–1938)
- Tomas Buenaflor, member for Iloilo's 4th district (1928–1934, 1935–1941)
- Felipe Buencamino Jr., member for Nueva Ecija's 2nd district (1931–1934, 1935–1941)
- Agapito Buenconsejo, member for Albay's 1st district (1919–1925)
- Andres Buendia, member for Batangas's 2nd district (1925–1928)
- Nicolas Buendia, member for Bulacan's 1st district (1935–1941)
- Danton Bueser, member for Laguna's 3rd district (1998–2007)
- Eric Buhain, member for Batangas's 1st district (2022–2025)
- Rafael Bulanyungan, member for Mountain Province (1917–1922)
- Vicente Bullecer, member for Bohol (1943–1944)
- Elias Bulut, member for Kalinga-Apayao (1992–1998), and Apayao (1998–2001)
- Elias Bulut Jr., member for Apayao (2001–2010, 2019–2022)
- Ignacio Bunye, member for Muntinlupa (1998–2001)
- Teofilo Buslon, member for Bohol's 3rd district (1938–1941)
- Andres Bustamante, member for Negros Oriental (1984–1986)
- Jorge Antonio Bustos, member for Patrol party-list (2019–2025)
- Ricardo Butalid, member for Region V (1978–1984)
