= List of members of the House of Representatives of the Philippines (V–W) =

This is a complete list of past and present members of the House of Representatives of the Philippines whose last names begin with the letter V and W.

This list also includes members of the Philippine Assembly (1907–1916), the Commonwealth National Assembly (1935–1941), the Second Republic National Assembly (1943–1944) and the Batasang Pambansa (1978–1986).

== Va ==
- Nicasio Valderrosa, member for Baguio (1943–1944)
- Edgar Valdez, member for APEC party-list (2002–2010)
- Estanislao Valdez, member for Region XII (1978–1984), and Sultan Kudarat (1987–1995)
- Simeon Valdez, member for Ilocos Norte's 2nd district (1961–1972, 1995–1998)
- Leon Valencia, member for Bulacan's 1st district (1945–1946)
- Rodolfo Valencia, member for Oriental Mindoro's 1st district (1987–1992, 2004–2013)
- Jose Valenciano, member for Albay's 2nd district (1931–1934, 1945–1946)
- Vicente Isidro Valera, member for Abra (1998–2001)
- Virgilo Valera, member for Abra (1949–1953)
- Wenceslao Valera, member for Nueva Vizcaya (1916–1919)
- Rolando Valeriano, member for Manila's 2nd district (2019–present)
- Gerardo Valmayor Jr., member for Negros Occidental's 1st district (2019–2025)
- Vicente Valley, member for Eastern Samar (1984–1986)
- Isidro Vamenta, member for Mindanao and Sulu (1919–1920), Misamis's 2nd district (1928–1931), and Misamis Oriental (1931–1934, 1938–1941, 1943–1944)
- Jose Varela Jr., member for Region VI (1978–1984), and Negros Occidental (1984–1986)
- Samantha Vargas-Alfonso, member for Cagayan's 2nd district (2019–2022)
- Alfred Vargas, member for Quezon City's 5th district (2013–2022)
- Patrick Michael Vargas, member for Quezon City's 5th district (2022–present)
- Florencio Vargas, member for Cagayan's 2nd district (2004–2010)
- Raymundo Vargas, member for Negros Occidental's 3rd district (1945–1946)
- Tomas Vargas, member for Iloilo's 5th district (1922–1925)
- Francisco Varona, member for Manila's 1st district (1928–1935)

== Ve ==
- Aguedo Velarde, member for Bulacan's 1st district (1907–1909, 1912–1914)
- Mariano Michael Velarde Jr., member for Buhay party-list (2010–2019)
- Rene Velarde, member for Buhay party-list (2003–2010)
- Lord Allan Velasco, member for Marinduque (2010–2013, 2016–2025)
- Lorna Velasco, member for AMA party-list (2013–2016)
- Tricia Nicole Velasco-Catera, member for MATA party-list (2016–2019)
- Teogenes Velez, member for Misamis's 2nd district (1925–1928)
- Alberto Veloso, member for Region VIII (1978–1984), Leyte (1984–1986), and Leyte's 3rd district (1987–1998)
- Anna Veloso-Tuazon, member for Leyte's 3rd district (2022–present)
- Domingo Veloso, member for Leyte's 2nd district (1946–1957)
- Eduardo Veloso, member for Leyte's 3rd district (1998–2007)
- Fernando Veloso, member for Samar's 2nd district (1961–1965), Western Samar (1965–1969), Samar (1969–1972, 1984–1986), and Region VIII (1978–1984)
- Girlie Veloso, member for Malasakit@Bayanihan party-list (2025–present)
- Ismael Veloso, member for Davao (1949–1957, 1961–1965)
- Jose Maria Veloso, member for Leyte's 3rd district (1922–1925), Leyte's 1st district (1935–1938), Leyte (1943–1944), and Leyte's 5th district (1945–1946)
- Manuel Veloso, member for Leyte's 1st district (1916–1919)
- Marcelino Veloso, member for Leyte's 1st district (1957–1961), and Leyte's 3rd district (1961–1972)
- Vicente Veloso III, member for Leyte's 3rd district (2016–2022)
- Dominador Venegas, member for Bataan's 2nd district (1992–1995)
- Pedro Venida, member for Camarines Norte (1957–1961)
- Gaudencio Vera, member for Quezon's 2nd district (1949–1953)
- Jose O. Vera, member for Albay's 2nd district (1916–1919)
- Pedro Vera, member for Albay's 2nd district (1928–1931), and Albay's 4th district (1931–1934, 1935–1941)
- Lorna Verano-Yap, member for Pasay (1987–1992)
- Felixberto Verano, member for Surigao (1949–1951)
- Ernesto Verceles, sectoral member (1992–1998)
- Leandro Verceles Jr., member for Catanduanes (1992–2001)
- Regino Veridiano, member for Cagayan's 2nd district (1935–1938)
- Bernardo Vergara, member for Baguio (1995–2001, 2010–2013)
- Jay Vergara, member for Nueva Ecija's 3rd district (2025–present)
- Rosanna Vergara, member for Nueva Ecija's 3rd district (2016–2025)
- Mauro Verzosa, member for Isabela (1916–1919, 1935–1941)
- Sam Verzosa, member for Tutok To Win party-list (2022–2025)
- Tolentino Verzosa, member for Isabela (1922–1925)

== Vi ==
- Romualdo Vicencio, member for Northern Samar's 2nd district (1998–2006)
- Rafael Vilar, member for Quezon's 2nd district (1922–1925)
- Jake Vincent Villa, member for Siquijor (2019–2022)
- Silvestre Villa, member for Iloilo's 3rd district (1931–1934)
- Zaldy Villa, member for Siquijor (2022–present)
- Luigi Villafuerte, member for Camarines Sur's 2nd district (2025–present)
- Luis Villafuerte, member for Region V (1978–1934), Camarines Sur (1984–1986), Camarines Sur's 2nd district (2004–2010), and Camarines Sur's 3rd district (2010–2013)
- Luis Raymund Villafuerte, member for Camarines Sur's 2nd district (2016–2025)
- Mariano Villafuerte, member for Camarines Sur's 1st district (1928–1934)
- Miguel Luis Villafuerte, member for Camarines Sur's 5th district (2022–present)
- Juan Villamor, member for Ilocos Sur's 3rd district (1907–1912)
- Eddie Villanueva, member for CIBAC party-list (2019–present)
- Enrique Villanueva, member for Negros Oriental's 2nd district (1925–1931)
- Fidel Villanueva, member for Ilocos Sur's 2nd district (1928–1934, 1946–1949), and Ilocos Sur (1943–1944)
- Francisco Villanueva, member for Iloilo's 1st district (1909–1916)
- Guillermo Zosimo Villanueva, member for Negros Oriental's 1st district (1922–1941), and Negros Oriental (1943–1944)
- Hermenegildo Villanueva, member for Negros Oriental's 1st district (1909–1916)
- Joel Villanueva, member for CIBAC party-list (2001–2010)
- Jose Lopez Villanueva, member for Negros Oriental's 1st district (1909–1916)
- Mario Villanueva, member for La Union's 2nd district (1928–1931)
- Noel Villanueva, member for Tarlac's 3rd district (2013–2022)
- Rafael Villanueva, member for Batangas's 2nd district (1922–1925)
- Antonio Villar, member for Pangasinan's 4th district (1969–1972), and Region I (1978–1984)
- Camille Villar, member for Las Piñas (2019–2025)
- Cynthia Villar, member for Las Piñas (2001–2010)
- Manny Villar, member for Las Piñas–Muntinlupa (1992–1998), and Las Piñas (1998–2001)
- Mark Villar, member for Las Piñas (2010–2016)
- Antonio Villarama, member for Bulacan's 2nd district (1935–1941, 1945–1946), and Bulacan (1943–1944)
- Wilfrido Villarama, member for Bulacan's 2nd district (2001–2004)
- Anna Villaraza-Suarez, member for ALONA party-list (2016–2025)
- Ceferino Villareal, member for Albay's 3rd district (1912–1916)
- Cornelio Villareal, member for Capiz (1943–1944), and Capiz's 2nd district (1945–1972, 1987–1992)
- Julita Villareal, member for Nueva Ecija's 4th district (1995–2001)
- Raul Villareal, member for Nueva Ecija's 4th district (2001–2004)
- Cesar Villariba, member for Region IV-A (1978–1984)
- Henry Villarica, member for Bulacan's 4th district (2019–2022)
- Linabelle Villarica, member for Bulacan's 4th district (2010–2019, 2022–present)
- Porfirio Villarin, member for Misamis Occidental (1946–1953)
- Tomasito Villarin, member for Akbayan party-list (2016–2019)
- Girlie Villarosa, member for Occidental Mindoro (1998–2000, 2004–2013)
- Jose T. Villarosa, member for Occidental Mindoro (1992–1998)
- Primo Villasin, member for Leyte's 2nd district (1961–1965)
- Alejandro Villaviza, sectoral member (1990–1998)
- Alberto Villavert, member for Antique (1943–1944)
- Jesus Villegas, member for Region VII (1978–1984)
- Restituto Villegas, member for Negros Oriental's 1st district (1916–1922)
- Wenceslao Vinzons, elected in 1941 as member for Camarines Norte, but died not being able to take office on July 15, 1942
- Liwayway Vinzons-Chato, member for Camarines Norte (2007–2010)
- Cholo Violago, member for Bulacan's 3rd district (2025–present)
- Eleuterio Violago, member for Nueva Ecija's 2nd district (1992–1998, 2001–2007)
- Joseph Gilbert Violago, member for Nueva Ecija's 2nd district (2007–2016, 2022–2025)
- Micaela Violago, member for Nueva Ecija's 2nd district (2016–2022)
- Joel Virador, member for Bayan Muna party-list (2003–2007)
- Cesar Virata, Cabinet member (1978–1984), and Cabinet member and member for Cavite (1984–1986)
- Emilio Virata, member for Cavite (1919–1922)
- Juan Virtudes, member for Bohol's 3rd district (1912–1916)
- Genaro Visarra, member for Bohol's 1st district (1938–1941, 1945–1949), and Bohol (1943–1944)
- Maria Salud Vivero-Parreño, member for Leyte's 2nd district (1965–1972)

== Wa ==
- Lawrence Wacnang, member for Kalinga (1998–2007)

== We ==
- Freddie Webb, member for Parañaque (1987–1992)
