= Plaza Divisoria =

Park in Cagayan de Oro, Philippines

- Golden Friendship Park
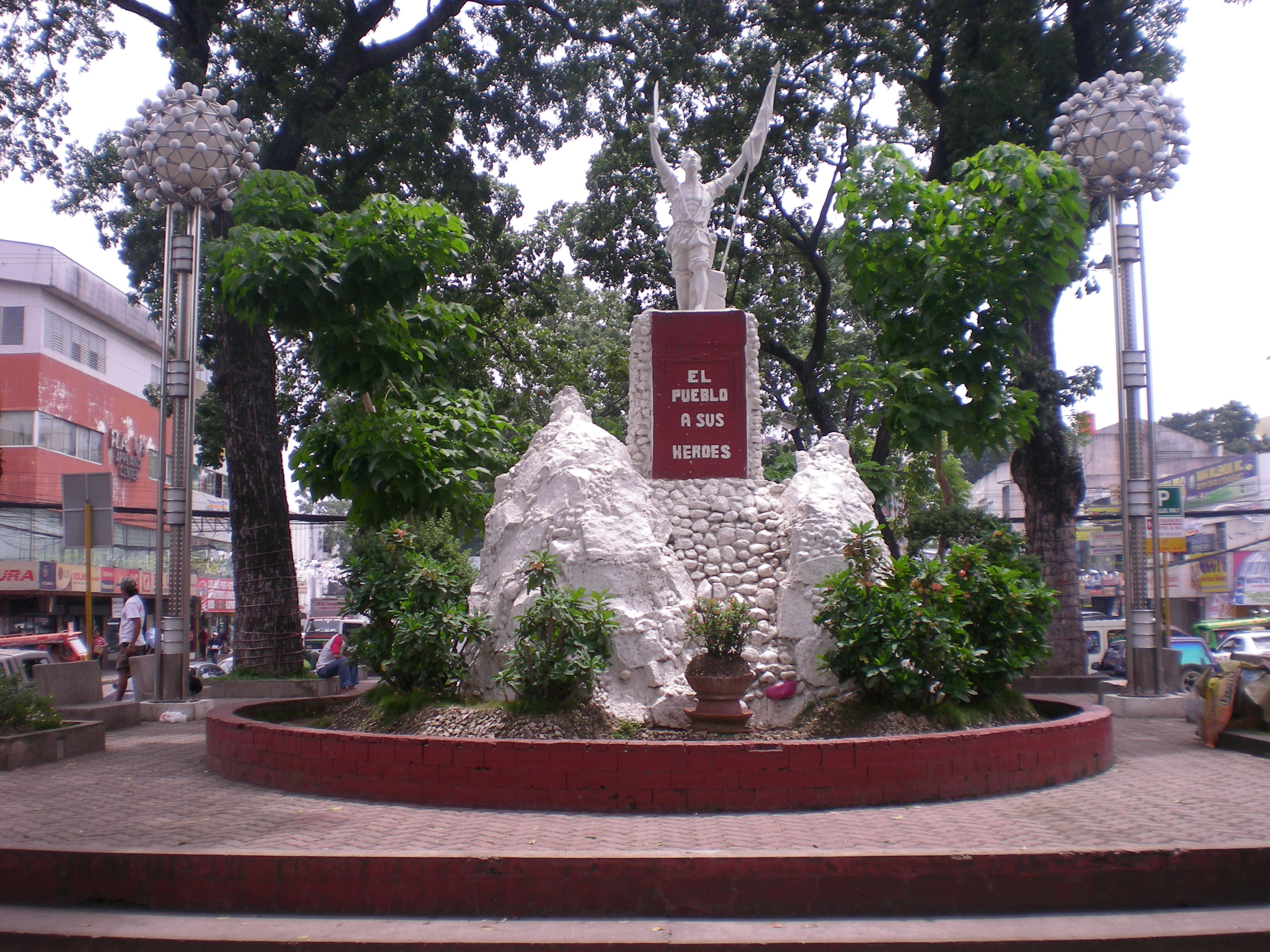
- The Bonifacio monument in 2008
- Interactive map of Plaza Divisoria
- Type: City plaza and amphitheater
- Location: Cagayan de Oro
- Coordinates: 8°28′39.9″N 124°38′37.6″E

Plaza Divisoria, also known as the Golden Friendship Park, is a park located in Cagayan de Oro City. The plaza was established in the town center as a fire break in the early 20th century and was then developed into an urban park. Since the 1920s, the surrounding area serves as a commercial center. The plaza features an amphitheater, a freedom park, and monuments such as a burial ground for Filipinos in the Filipino-American War.

== Description ==
The park is bounded by the Cagayan River in the west and Xavier University – Ateneo de Cagayan in the east. Plaza Divisoria is situated between two tree-lined roads: the North Divisoria and South Divisoria roads, renamed to Tirso Neri and RN Abejuela Streets. It is separated into six island sections by roads, named the Amphitheater Area, JR Borja Park, Rizal Park, Kiosko Kagawasan (lit. 'Freedom Kiosk'), Bonifacio Park, and Magsaysay Park. The park features monuments of Jose Rizal, Andres Bonifacio, Ramon Magsaysay, and former mayor of Cagayan de Oro Justiniano Borja. Each section also contains benches along with trees, such as mahogany.

Kiosko Kagawasan, formerly known as the Bandstand, serves as a freedom park, which were used as gathering places for demonstrations such as the People Power Revolution, Second EDSA Revolution, and the National Rally for Peace. Kiosko Kagawasan also hosts the statue of Justiniano Borja sculpted by Napoleon Abueva. The Cagayan de Oro Amphitheater, located in Plaza Divisoria and also used as a venue for demonstrations, is situated in the former location of a municipal market relocated in 1958.. The amphitheater, which architecturally followed the Hollywood Bowl, was built in the same year by Justiniano Borja but was demolished in 2010 to make way for an overpass and public educational and cultural facility, which was left unfinished. Restoration of the amphitheater began in April 2019 and was reopened in February 2022. Aside from political events, cultural events such as amateur boxing matches and beauty pageants are also held in the amphitheater.

The Bonifacio monument, located in the middle of Plaza Divisoria serves as the burial site of skeletal remains of local heroes who resisted American forces during the Philippine-American War. The monument, which has text inscribed "El Pueblo A Sus Héroes" (lit. 'The Town to its Heroes') depicts Andres Bonifacio in the Cry of Pugad Lawin on a pile of white stones that make up a chamber for the remains. The monument was erected in 1931 by municipal mayor Apolinar Velez in honor of the Filipinos who died in the Battle of Agusan Hill.

== History ==
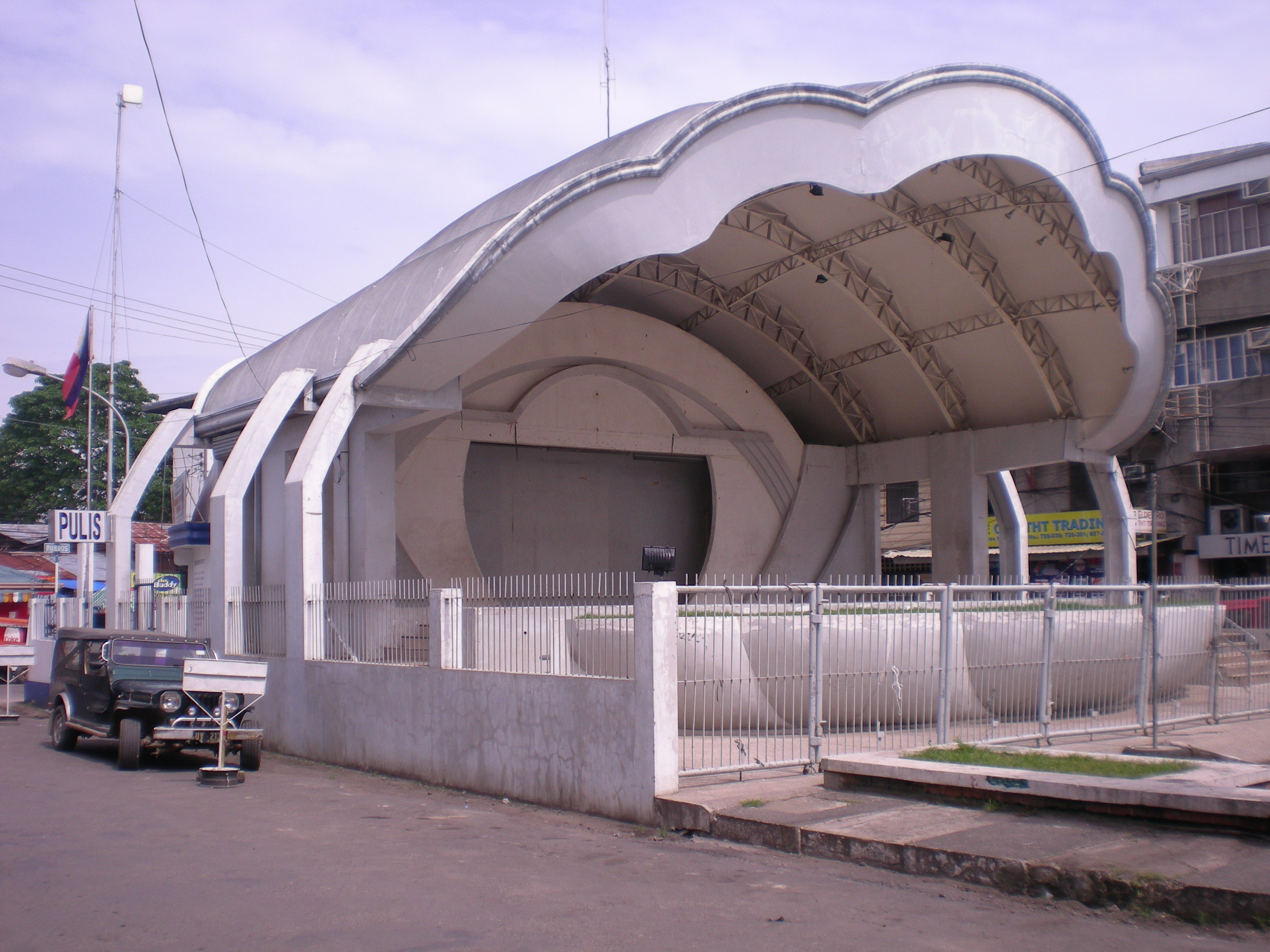
The amphitheater in 2008, which was demolished in 2010 for an unfinished development and was restored 12 years later

The park was built in the early 20th century as a fire break that divides two areas of the city center. Its construction was initiated by Tirso Neri. (Note: Other sources claim a more specific year, such as 1902) Divisoria eventually served as a business district surrounded by commercial pedestrian streets, starting from the 1920s. Plaza Divisoria won the first prize in the Plaza Category National Committee Beautification Contest in 1962. Divisoria was planned to be expanded and converted into a pedestrian shopping mall in 1972 in the Framework Plan for the City of Cagayan de Oro. This plan was not done.

Vicente Emano established the formation of a Night Café in 2003. The Night Café was a public regular weekend festivity that allowed vendors at night from 7:00 pm to 2:00 am. The plaza was physically renovated in 2004 with large multi-colored lamp posts, permanent toilets, a dancing fountain, and paved stone footpaths after it was formally designated as a Business-Tourism Park in October the same year. Vendors, who reported to earn a higher income after the opening of the Night Café, sold everyday items, second-hand apparel, food and beverages, domestic pets, and pirated DVDS in the park. Masseurs, henna tattoo artists, band players, and prostitutes also provided services in the Night Café.

Months after the opening of the Night Café, vendors were found violating rules. For instance, liquor was sold to minors, garbage disposal rules were disregarded, and vendors did not follow the prescribed schedule of setting up and closing their stalls. Although rule amendments were passed, local authorities were unable to enforce the guidelines. During the Night Café, the closure of two main roads, Tirso Neri and RN Abejuela, caused traffic jams. Drunken customers also desecrated monuments and loud music from live bands disrupted classes in the nearby Xavier University – Ateneo de Cagayan. As there was no proper water supply in the park, vendors used pails for hand and dishwashing. The Night Café ceased in 2013 by Oscar Moreno in his first executive order.

A redevelopment plan called Project Lunhaw (transl. Project Green) was commenced in 2017 to renovate Plaza Divisoria and provide green spaces along Cagayan River through various phases with United Nations Habitat. Several sections of the park was reopened in June 2025 after a six-month renovation worth around ₱50 million. Renovations included path accessibility, replanting, addition of permeable concrete, and plans for a fountain near the Bonifacio monument.

== See also ==
- Plaza Miranda
- Plaza Miranda bombing
