= Misamis's 1st congressional district =

Legislative district of the Philippines

Misamis's 1st congressional district was one of the two congressional districts of the Philippines in the formerly undivided province of Misamis. It was created ahead of the 1907 Philippine Assembly elections and initially comprised the municipalities east of Macajalar Bay and on the island of Camiguin, namely Balingasag, Mambajao, Tagoloan and Talisayan. It was represented in all three meetings of the Philippine Assembly from 1907 to 1916 and the first five meetings of the House of Representatives under the Insular Government of the Philippine Islands from 1916 to 1931.

The district was represented by a total of six representatives throughout its existence. It was abolished in 1931 after Misamis was split between the new provinces of Misamis Occidental and Misamis Oriental created through Act No. 3537 in 1930. It was last represented by Silvino Maestrado of the Nacionalista Consolidado who was also designated as the first representative for Misamis Oriental according to the legislative act.

== Representation history ==
#	Image	Member	Term of office		Legislature	Party	Electoral history	Constituent LGUs
#	Image	Member	Start	End	Legislature	Party	Electoral history	Constituent LGUs
=== Misamis's 1st district for the Philippine Assembly ===
District created January 9, 1907.
1		Carlos Corrales	October 16, 1907	October 16, 1909	1st	Independent	Elected in 1907.	1907–1909; Balingasag, Mambajao, Tagoloan, Talisayan
2		León Borromeo	October 16, 1909	October 16, 1916	2nd	Nacionalista	Elected in 1909.	1909–1912; Balingasag, Gingoog, Mambajao, Sagay, Tagoloan, Talisayan
2		León Borromeo	October 16, 1909	October 16, 1916	3rd	Nacionalista	Re-elected in 1912.	1912–1916; Balingasag, Catarman, Gingoog, Mambajao, Sagay, Tagoloan, Talisayan
=== Misamis's 1st district for the House of Representatives of the Philippine Islands ===
3		Gregorio Borromeo	October 16, 1916	June 3, 1919	4th	Nacionalista	Elected in 1916.	1916–1919; Balingasag, Catarman, Gingoog, Mambajao, Sagay, Tagoloan, Talisayan
4		José Artadi	June 3, 1919	June 2, 1925	5th	Nacionalista	Elected in 1919.	1919–1928; Balingasag, Catarman, Gingoog, Mambajao, Sagay, Salay, Tagoloan, Talisayan
4		José Artadi	June 3, 1919	June 2, 1925	6th	Nacionalista; Unipersonalista	Re-elected in 1922.	1919–1928; Balingasag, Catarman, Gingoog, Mambajao, Sagay, Salay, Tagoloan, Talisayan
5		Segundo Gastón	June 2, 1925	June 5, 1928	7th	Demócrata	Elected in 1925.	1919–1928; Balingasag, Catarman, Gingoog, Mambajao, Sagay, Salay, Tagoloan, Talisayan
6		Silvino Maestrado	June 5, 1928	June 2, 1931	8th	Nacionalista; Consolidado	Elected in 1928.	1928–1931; Balingasag, Catarman, Claveria, Gingoog, Mambajao, Sagay, Salay, Tagoloan, Talisayan
District dissolved into Misamis Oriental's at-large district.

== See also ==
- Legislative districts of Misamis Occidental
- Legislative districts of Misamis Oriental
