= Cayetano Pacana =

Filipino politician

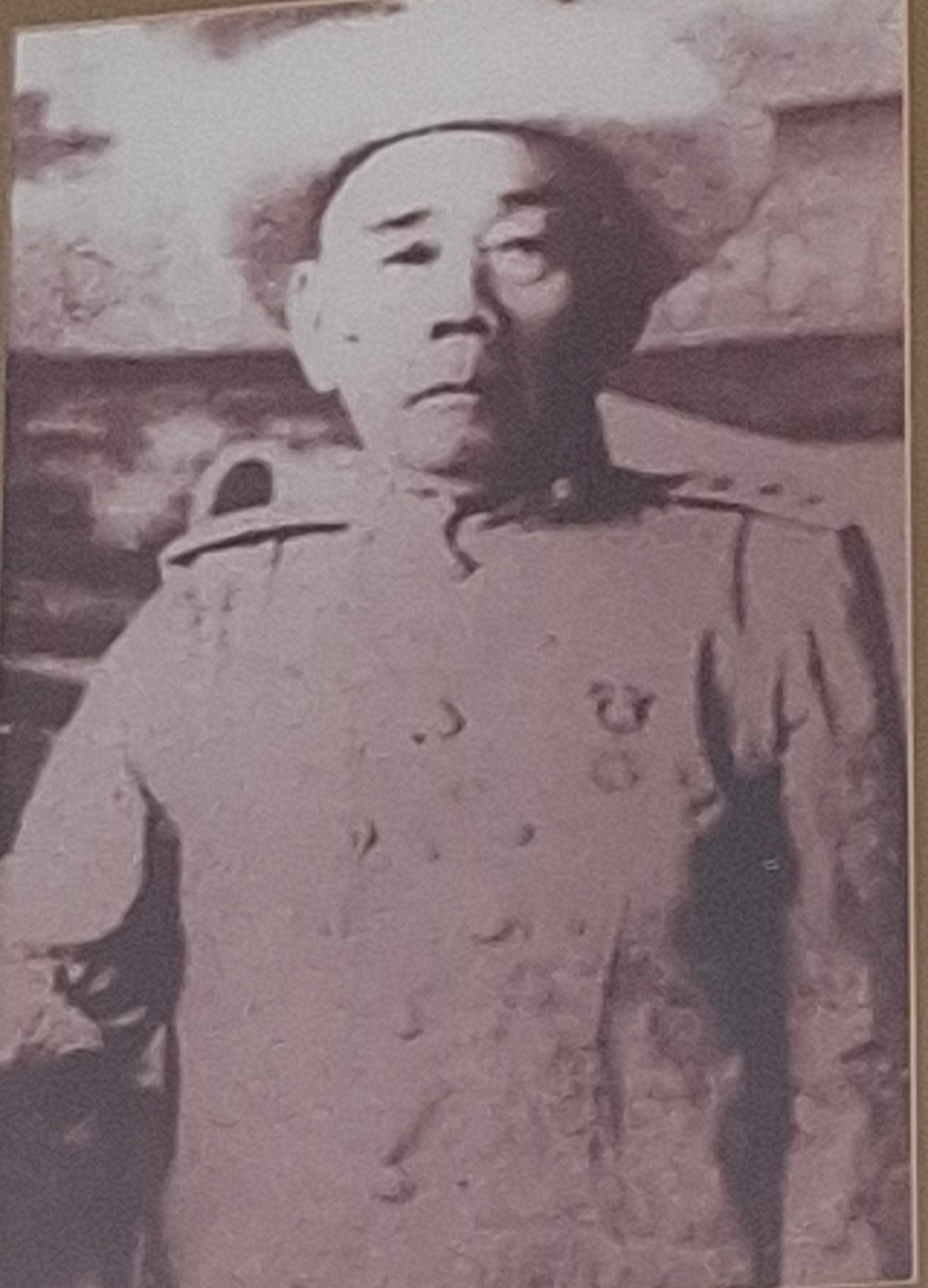
Cayetano Pacana

Cayetano Pacana was the second Mayor of Cagayan de Misamis. From 1898 to 1899, he was the gobernadorcillo of Misamis. He served as mayor from 1903–1905. He was a Hero of the Battle of Cagayan de Misamis in 1900.

Preceded by Tirso Neri	Mayor of Cagayan de Oro; 1904–1905	Succeeded by Pedro Velez
Preceded by Cristobal de Aguilar; Spanish Governor	Governor of Misamis; 1898–1899	Succeeded by Jose Casas Roa (as Provincial President)
