= Gaston Park (Cagayan de Oro) =

Park in Cagayan de Oro, Philippines

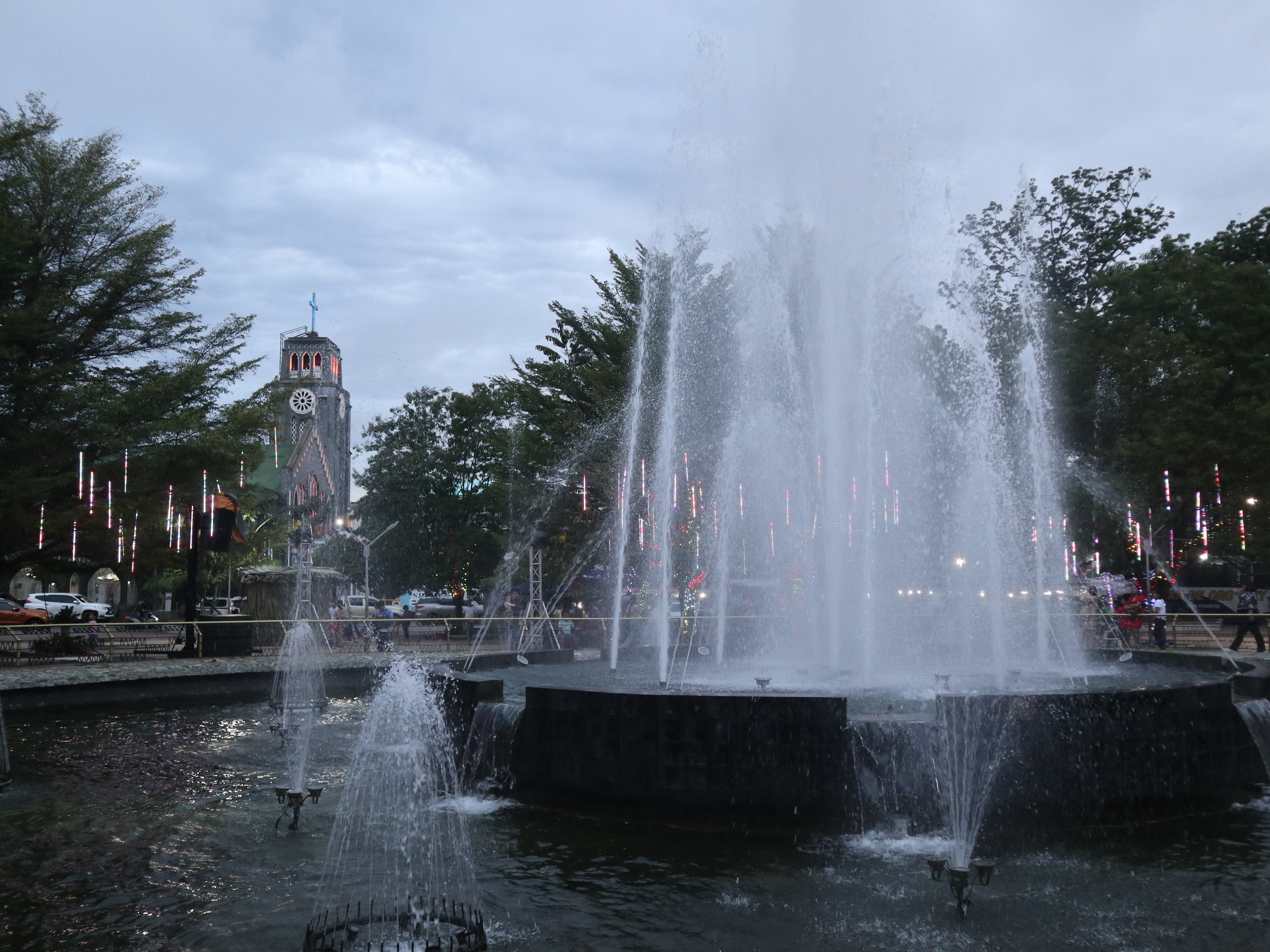
- The park's fountain in 2023
- Interactive map of Gaston Park
- Type: Urban park
- Location: Cagayan de Oro
- Coordinates: 8°28′31.44″N 124°38′31.56″E

Gaston Park is a park located in Cagayan de Oro, Philippines. The park serves as the main plaza of the city since the Spanish era. It is located beside Saint Augustine Metropolitan Cathedral and is named after former mayor Segundo Gaston.

== Description ==
Gaston Park is structured as a rotunda park for its circular shape. It is near the Saint Augustine Metropolitan Cathedral and the Cagayan de Oro city hall, formerly the Casa Real de Cagayan.

The park has a playground and various food stands. A memorial wall engraved with the names of those deceased by Tropical Storm Washi was erected in the park.

== History ==
Gaston Park, which began in the 17th century, served as a town square of Cagayan de Misamis, now Cagayan de Oro. The area was the site of the Battle of Cagayan de Misamis in April 1900.

A jet fountain was installed during the term of Justiniano Borja as mayor. A national historical marker was placed in 2000. During the mayoral term of Oscar Moreno, the park's fountain was rehabilitated and the grounds, which used to be grass, was tiled. The renovation took three years from 2013 to 2016.
