= Ramon Neri =

Filipino journalist and politician (1884-1929)

The Honorable Ramon Neri
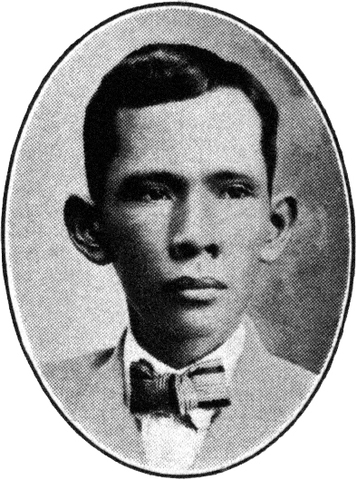
- Neri in c. 1917

Member of the House of Representatives from Misamis's 2nd district
- In office October 16, 1916 – June 3, 1919
- Preceded by: Nicolas Capistrano
- Succeeded by: Fortunato Clavano

Mayor of Cagayan de Misamis
- In office January 3, 1910 – October 21, 1912
- Preceded by: Isidro Vamenta
- Succeeded by: Uldarico Akut

Personal details
- Born: November 20, 1884 Cagayan, Misamis, Captaincy General of the Philippines
- Died: June 28, 1929 (aged 44) Cagayan, Misamis, Philippine Islands
- Party: Nacionalista

Ramón B. Neri y San José (November 20, 1884 – June 28, 1929) was a Filipino journalist and politician who was the Mayor of Cagayan de Misamis from 1912–1916 and represented Misamis during the 4th Philippine Legislature. Together with his brother, Misamis Oriental Governor Vicente Neri, they Founded the first weekly newspaper in Cagayan de Oro. It was called Ang Katarungan.

Preceded by Isidro Vamenta	Mayor of Cagayan de Misamis; January 3, 1910 – October 21, 1912	Succeeded by Uldarico Akut
