= Battle of Agusan Hill =

1900 Filipino battle

- Part of Philippine–American War
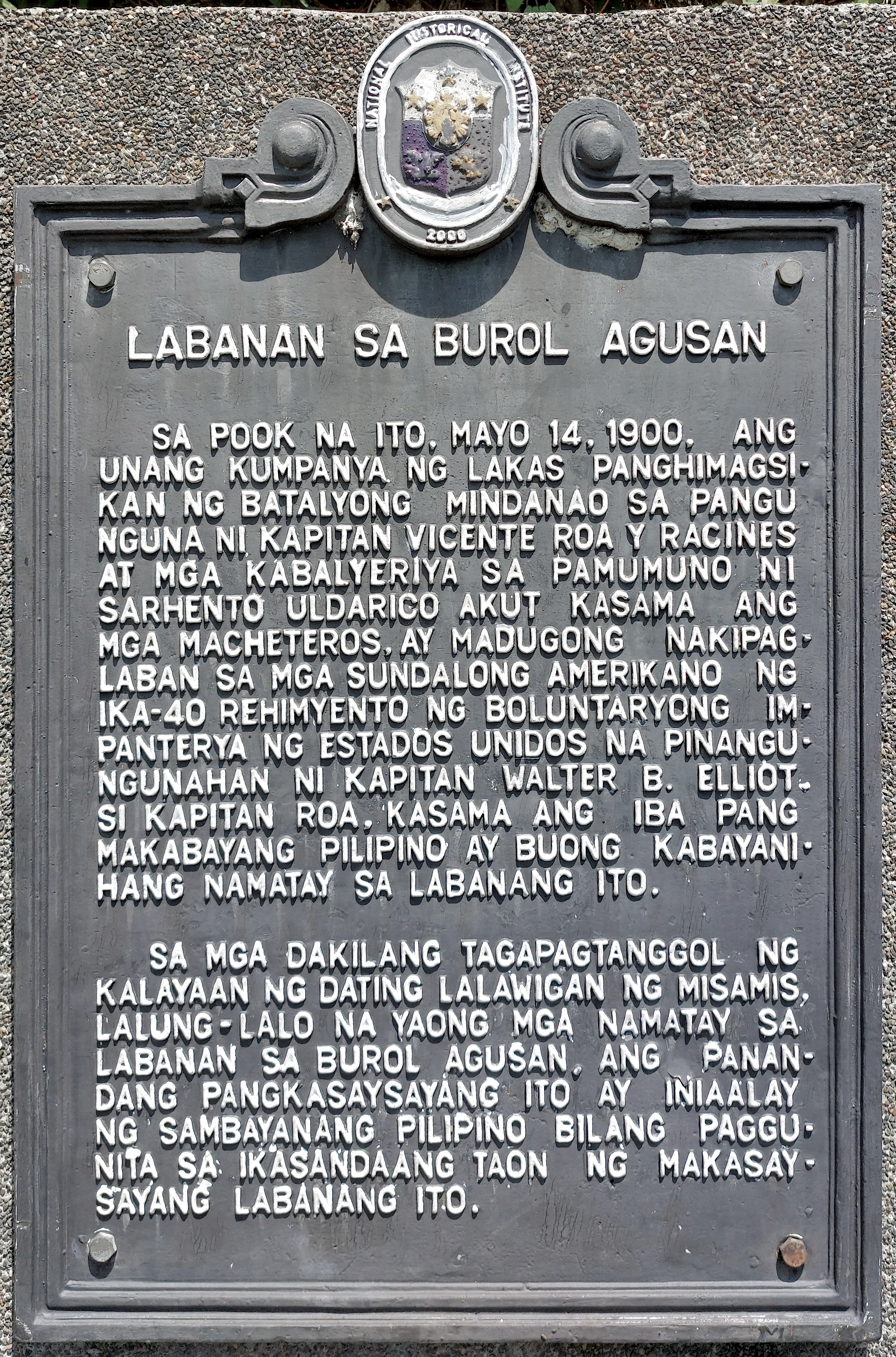
- Historical marker installed in 2000 at the site of the battle
Date	May 14, 1900
Location	Cagayan de Oro, Mindanao
Result	American victory

Belligerents
First Philippine Republic	United States

Commanders and leaders
Capt. Vicente Roa †	Capt. Walter B. Elliot

Strength
500	80

Casualties and losses
38 killed	2 killed 3 wounded

Battle of Agusan Hill, May 14, 1900. Capt. Walter B. Elliott, CO of Company I, 40th Infantry Regiment USV, with 80 men proceeded to the village of Agusan, about 16 kilometers west of Cagayan de Misamis town proper, to dislodge about 500 guerillas who were entrenched on a hill with 200 rifles and shotguns. The attack was successful; 2 Americans were killed and 3 wounded; the Filipinos suffered 38 killed, including their commander, Capt. Vicente Roa. The Americans also captured 35 Remington rifles.

== See also ==
- Philippine–American War
- Battle of Cagayan de Misamis
- Battle of Makahambus Hill
- Cagayan de Oro
