= CGH =

CGH may refer to:

- Comparative genomic hybridization
- Computer-generated holography
- the IATA airport code of Congonhas-São Paulo Airport
- Changi General Hospital, a hospital in Simei, Singapore
- Chinese General Hospital, a hospital in Manila, Philippines
- Colorado General Hospital, former name of University of Colorado Hospital
- cGh physics, a characterization of unified physical theories encompassing relativity, gravitation and quantum mechanics
- Coventry Godiva Harriers
- Chief of the Order of the Golden Heart of Kenya
- Camiguin General Hospital, a hospital in Mambajao, Philippines
