= Isidro Vamenta =

Filipino politician

The Honorable Isidro Vamenta
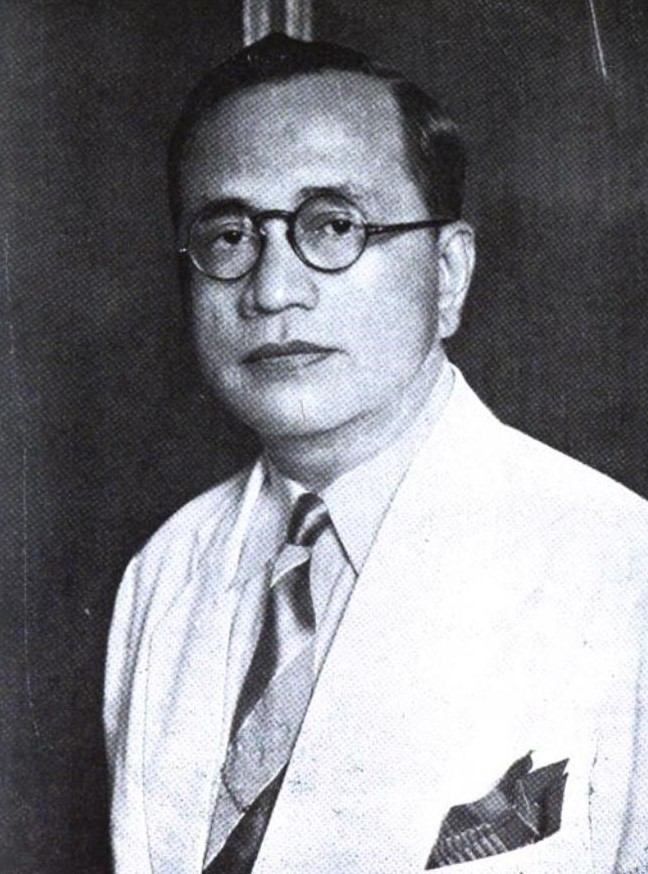
- Photograph from The Commercial & Industrial Manual of the Philippines, 1941

Member of the National Assembly from Misamis Oriental
- In office September 25, 1943 – February 2, 1944 Serving with José Artadi

Member of the House of Representatives from Misamis Oriental's at-large district
- In office December 30, 1938 – December 30, 1941
- Preceded by: Leon Borromeo
- Succeeded by: Position abolished Position next held by Jose Artadi
- In office June 2, 1931 – June 5, 1934
- Preceded by: District established
- Succeeded by: Segundo Gastón

Member of the House of Representatives from Misamis's 2nd district
- In office June 5, 1928 – June 2, 1931
- Preceded by: Teogenes Vélez
- Succeeded by: District abolished

Member of the House of Representatives of the Philippine Islands from Department of Mindanao and Sulu's Lone District
- In office 1919–1920 Serving with Datu Piang, Teodoro Palma Gil, Datu Tampugao, and Pablo Lorenzo
- Appointed by: Francis Burton Harrison

Mayor of Cagayan de Misamis
- In office 1908–1909
- Preceded by: Cipriano Vamenta, Sr.
- Succeeded by: Ramon Neri

Personal details
- Born: Isidro Vamenta y Abrogar; May 15, 1884 Cagayan, Misamis, Captaincy General of the Philippines
- Died: Unknown
- Party: Nacionalista
- Other political affiliations: KALIBAPI

Isidro Vamenta y Abrogar was a Filipino politician. He served the Mayor of Cagayan de Misamis from 1908 to 1909. He later represented the second district of the then-undivided province of Misamis from 1928 to 1931 and the lone district of Misamis Oriental from 1931 to 1934, from 1939 to 1941, and from 1943 to 1944. He studied law at the Escuela de Derecho.

Political offices
Preceded by Cipriano Vamenta Sr.	Mayor of Cagayan de Misamis; 1908–1909	Succeeded by Ramon B. Neri
House of Representatives of the Philippines
Preceded by Teogenes Vélez	Representative, 2nd district of Misamis; 1928–1931	District abolished
New district	Representative, Misamis Oriental; 1931–1934	Succeeded by Segundo Gastón
