= Mayor of Cagayan de Oro =

Local chief executive of Cagayan de Oro, Philippines

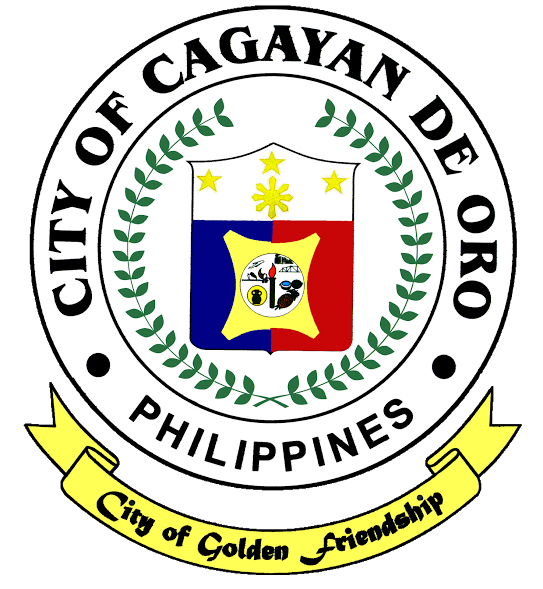
- Seal of Cagayan de Oro
- Incumbent; Rolando Adlao Uy since June 30, 2022
- Style: The Honorable (Formal)
- Appointer: Elected via popular vote
- Term length: 3 years, not eligible for re-election immediately after three consecutive terms
- Inaugural holder: Toribio Chaves
- Formation: 1898

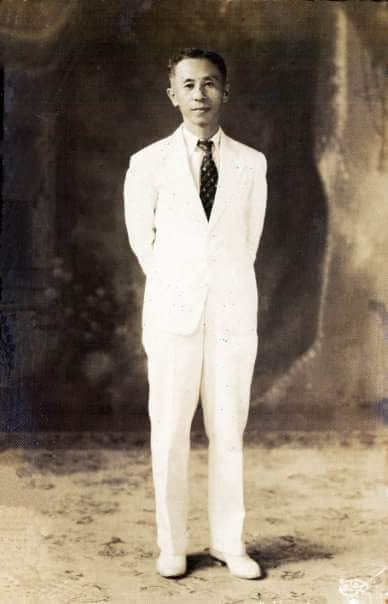
Mariano A. Velez appointed Military Mayor after World War II to rehabilitate the city.

The mayor of Cagayan de Oro (Filipino: Punong lungsod ng Cagayan de Oro) is the head of the local government of the city who elected to three year terms. The Mayor is also the executive head and leads the city's departments in executing the city ordinances and improving public services. The city mayor is restricted to three consecutive terms, totaling nine years, although a mayor can be elected again after an interruption of one term.

== Cagayan de Misamis ==
No.	Photo	Mayor	Period	Vice Mayor	Note
1		Toribio Chaves	December 1898 – 1900		the first Municipal Mayor
2		Tirso Neri	1901-1904		
3		Cayetano Pacana	1904-1905		
4		Pedro Vélez	January–April, 1906		
5		Cipriano Vamenta, Sr.	1906-1908		
6		Isidro Vamenta	1908-1909		
5		Ramon B. Neri	January 3, 1910 – October 21, 1912		
6		Uldarico Akut	1912-1916		
7		Segundo Gaston	1916-1919		
8		Pedro P. Mabulay	1919-1922		Appointed by Insular Government of the Philippine Islands United States Territorial Government
9		Fernándo Pacana, Sr.	1922-1925		
10		Vicente P. Castro	1925-1928	Mariano A. Velez	
11		Don Apolinar Vélez	1928-1931	Mariano A. Velez	
12		Lucio S. Ramos	1931-1934		
13		Julio B. Pacana	(1934-1940 died in office)	Roque Chávez	
14		Roque Chávez	1940-1945	Patricia Velez y Mercado	Then vice mayor Roque Chaves assumed the post of Mayor after the untimely demise of Julio Pacana in 1940. Patricia Mercado Velez as the #1 Municipal Councilor assume the vacated Vice Mayor position. Patricia Mercado became the first female council and eventually the first female vice mayor.
15		Herminigildo Avanceña	1941-1945, 1946	Salvador Pacana (1945-1947)	restored to office.

== Post World War II ==
No.	Photo	Mayor	Period	Vice Mayor	Note
16		Lucio S. Ramos	1946-1947		on his second term as Municipal Mayor.
17		Mariano A. Vélez Sr.	1948		appointed as Military Mayor entrusted for the post-World War II rehabilitation.

== City of Cagayan de Oro ==
No.	Photo	Mayor	Period	Vice Mayor
1		Máximo Y. Suniel	1948-1953	Pedro E. Pimentel
2		Pedro S. Baculio	1953-1955	Osmundo R. Waga (1952-1962); Alejandro M. Velez (1963); Jesús V. Seriña, Sr. (1964)
3		Justiniano Borja	1955-1964	Osmundo R. Waga (1952-1962); Alejandro M. Velez (1963); Jesús V. Seriña, Sr. (1964)
4		Jesús V. Seriña, Sr.	1964-1971	Pio Roa (1966-1967); Cecilio Luminarias (1967-1976)
5		Reuben R. Canoy	1971-1976	Pio Roa (1966-1967); Cecilio Luminarias (1967-1976)
6		Concordio C. Diel	1976-1978	Pio Roa (1966-1967); Cecilio Luminarias (1967-1976)
7		Pedro "Oloy" N. Roa	1978-1980	
8		Aquilino Pimentel, Jr.	1980-1984	Pablo "Ambing" P. Magtájas (1980-1984)
9		Pablo "Ambing" P. Magtájas	1984–1998	Henry J. Bacal (1984–1987); Erasmo Damásing (1988–1992); Antonio Soriano (1992-1995); John L. Elizaga (1995-1998)
10		Manolo Z. Tagarda	1998	
11		John L. Elizaga	1998	
12		Vicente Yap Emano	1998–2007	John L. Elizaga (1998-2004); Michelle J. Tagarda-Spiers (2004–2007)
13		Constantino Jaraula	2007–2010	Vicente Yap Emano (2007–2010)
14		Vicente Yap Emano	2010–2013	Cesar Ian Acenas (2010–2016)
15		Oscar S. Moreno	2013–2022	Cesar Ian Acenas (2010–2016)
15		Oscar S. Moreno	2013–2022	Raineir Joaquín Vélez Uy (2016–2022)
16		Rolando A. Uy	2022–present	Jocelyn B. Rodriguez

== Vice Mayor ==
The Vice Mayor is the second-highest official of the city The vice mayor is elected via popular vote; although most mayoral candidates have running mates, the vice mayor is elected separately from the mayor. This can result in the mayor and the vice mayor coming from different political parties.

The Vice Mayor is the presiding officer of the 19-man Cagayan de Oro City Council, and he can only vote in case of a tiebreaker. If the mayor dies or is either suspended or removed from office, the vice mayor assumes the functions as city mayor and serve out his remaining term until the next election.

In case that the vice mayor dies while in office or is either removed or suspended, his duties will be carried out by the No.1 councilor, which is the councilor who garnered the most votes in the immediately preceding election.

The incumbent Vice Mayor is Jocelyn B. Rodriguez as of June 30, 2022.

== See also ==
- Justiniano R. Borja
