= Freedom park =

Area for free speech in the Philippines

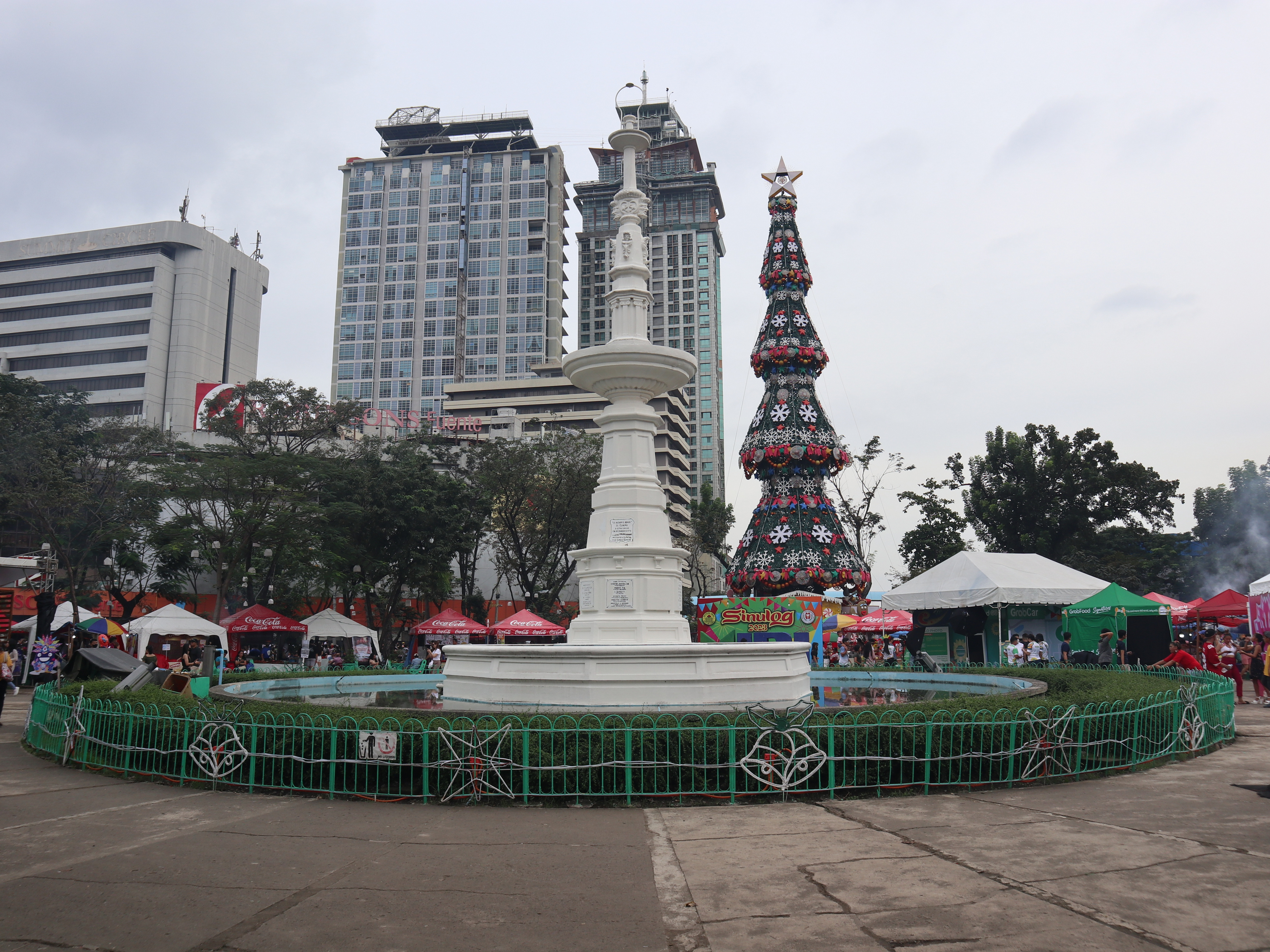
From 1985 to 2006, the Fuente Osmeña Circle in Cebu City was the country's only freedom park.

In the Philippines, a freedom park is a centrally located public space where political gatherings, rallies and demonstrations may be held without the need of prior permission from government authorities. Similar to free speech zones in the United States, the existence of freedom parks are based on the premise that the government may regulate the time, place and manner of assemblies, without prejudice to the nature of expression being expressed in those assemblies.

These spaces, of which every city and municipality is required to have at least one space designated as such, were created as a result of Reyes v. Bagatsing, a 1983 case heard by the Supreme Court of the Philippines where it was decided that there is no legal impediment to holding a rally in a public venue, which in this case was Rizal Park. This led to the enactment of Batas Pambansa Blg. 880, the Public Assembly Act of 1985, which codified the Reyes decision.

Despite the Public Assembly Act of 1985 requiring that all cities and municipalities have freedom parks, until 2006 only one freedom park was legally designated in the entire country: the Fuente Osmeña Rotonda in downtown Cebu City, according to testimony provided by Alfredo Benipayo, then Solicitor General of the Philippines, in Bayan v. Ermita. In its decision of the case, promulgated on April 26, 2006, the Supreme Court stipulated that in the absence of a freedom park in a particular city or municipality, all public spaces in that particular locality shall be open for the use of the public to peacefully assemble, with the only requirement for doing such being prior notice given to the local mayor. Most localities established freedom parks after Bayan v. Ermita was heard by the Supreme Court, following an order wherein all cities and municipalities were to establish freedom parks within thirty days of the decision's promulgation.

Freedom parks may not be closed without provisions for its relocation, under Section 21 of the Local Government Code of 1991.

== List ==
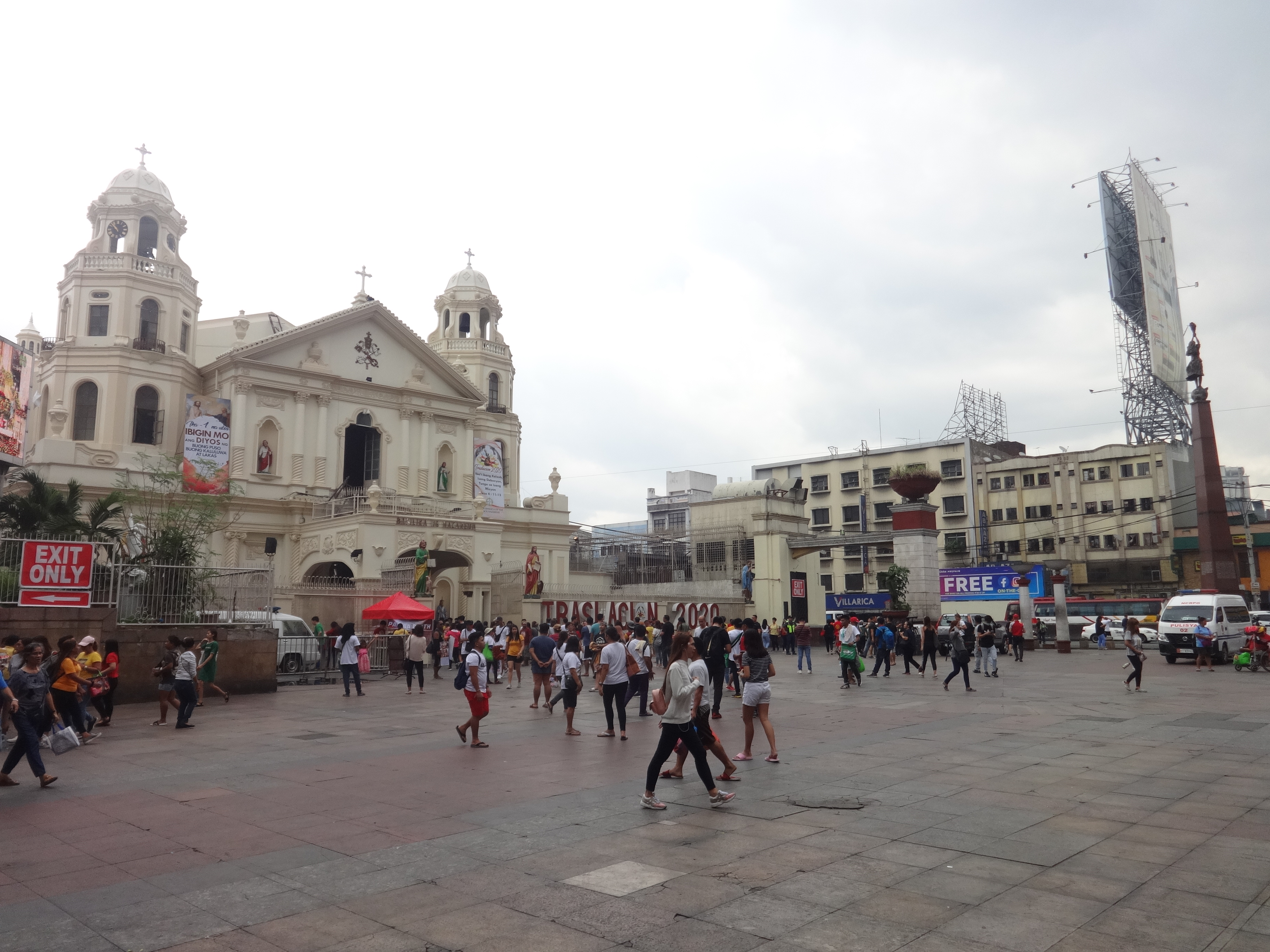
Plaza Miranda is one of Manila's four freedom parks.

In 2006, the Department of the Interior and Local Government designated the following as freedom parks in Metro Manila:

- Caloocan: LRT-1 Westside in Grace Park
- Manila:
  - Plaza Miranda
  - Plaza Dilao
  - Plaza Moriones
  - Liwasang Bonifacio
  - Although not officially designated as such, Rizal Park (a.k.a. Luneta) is considered as a de facto freedom park and rallies may be held in the venue without permits. The Agrifina Circle, also located in the park itself, falls under the same category.
- Makati: Paseo de Roxas corner Makati Avenue
- Marikina: Freedom Park (in front of Marikina city hall)
- Navotas: Veterans Park
- Pasig: Plaza Rizal (in front of Pasig Cathedral)
- Quezon City: Quezon Memorial Circle
- San Juan: Pinaglabanan Shrine
- Valenzuela: Park in front of Valenzuela City Hall (by 2015, this became the Valenzuela People's Park)

In 2020, the Commission on Human Rights reiterated that the University of the Philippines Diliman campus, including Liwasang Diokno outside their headquarters, is a freedom park. The Public Assembly Act of 1985 states that a "campus of a government-owned and operated educational institution" are freedom parks.

Other cities:

- Baguio: Malcolm Square
- Bacolod City:
  - Bacolod City Public Plaza
  - Fountain of Justice (under redevelopment with the Old City Hall)
- Iloilo City
  - Iloilo Freedom Grandstand
  - Ganzon Freedom Park
- Dumaguete: Ninoy Aquino Freedom Park
- Cebu City:
  - Fuente Osmeña Circle
  - Carbon Market Freedom Park
- Cagayan de Oro: Kiosko Kagawasan (a portion of Plaza Divisoria)
- Zamboanga City
  - Cesar Climaco Freedom Park
  - Pasonanca Park
- Davao City:
  - Clifford Park
  - Millennium Park
- General Santos City: Oval Plaza

== See also ==
- Speakers' Corner
