= Justiniano Borja =

Filipino politician

Honorable Justiniano R. Borja
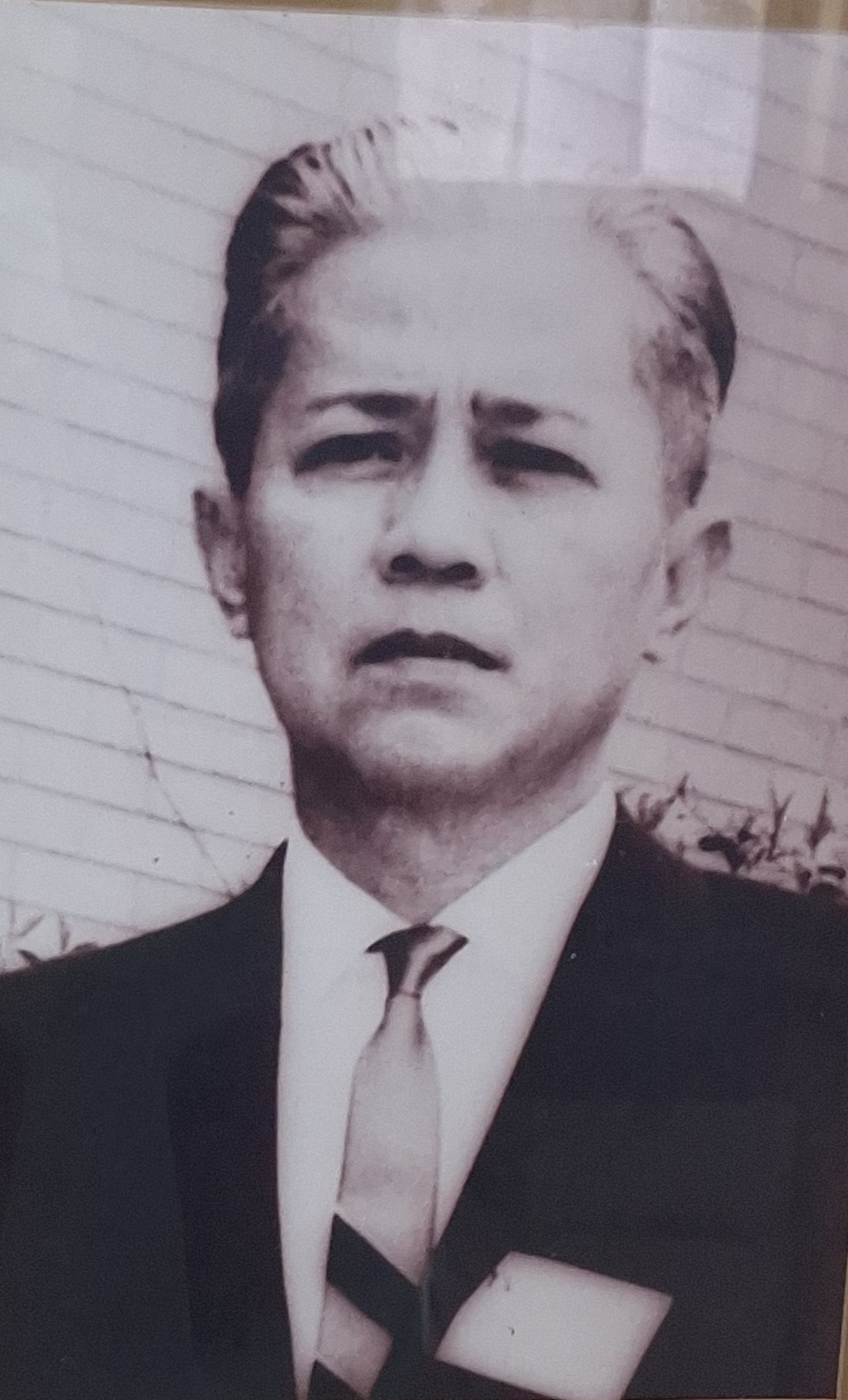

3rd Mayor of Cagayan de Oro
- In office 1955 – October 3, 1964
- Preceded by: Pedro Sa. Baculio
- Succeeded by: Jesus V. Serina Sr.

Personal details
- Born: July 6, 1912 Cagayan de Oro, Misamis, Philippine Islands
- Died: October 3, 1964 (aged 52) Manila, Philippines
- Spouse: Dulce Valdehuesa

Justiniano Romulo Dancel Borja (July 6, 1912 – October 3, 1964) was the mayor of Cagayan de Oro from 1955 to 1964.

== Background ==
Borja was responsible for economic growth in Cagayan de Oro. He is known for opening the Cogon Public Market in 1959 and was called the "Arsenio Lacson of Cagayan de Oro". He died in his office on October 3, 1964.

== Information ==
Historian and anthropologist Dr. Antonio J. Montalvan II wrote that Borja was called the Arsenio Lacson of Cagayan de Oro because "he was, above all, no-nonsense. He ruled without fear or favor. He had political will. Most importantly, he remained simple and would walk to and from his office without any bodyguards. His funeral cortege, which I personally witnessed, was attended by legions of Kagay-anons, many of whom openly wept at the sight of his bier, which was placed atop a decorated float. Shops and establishments were closed for business at their own behest."

== Legacy ==
Borja is the only city mayor who has been given multiple honors, proof of how much he was loved by the city that he served so well. There are J.R. Borja Street, JR Borja Memorial Medical Hospital (City Hospital), and a statue located at Plaza Divisoria (Golden Friendship Park). He was the only city mayor of Cagayan de Oro given a doctorate degree "Honoris Causa" in public administration by Xavier University - Ateneo de Cagayan in 1963. Many male babies were named Justiniano, complete with the nickname of Tiñing.

Raf Benaldo, who served as undersecretary of the Department of the Interior and Local Government (DILG), told Montalvan that Tiñing Borja has become the benchmark for the city's public servants, a fact that, sadly, no one has capably equaled. - Elson T. Elizaga.

| Preceded by Pedro Sa. Baculio | Mayor of Cagayan de Oro; 1955–1963 | Succeeded by Jesus V. Seriña Sr. |
