= Plaza Dilao =

Public square in Paco, Manila

- Public square
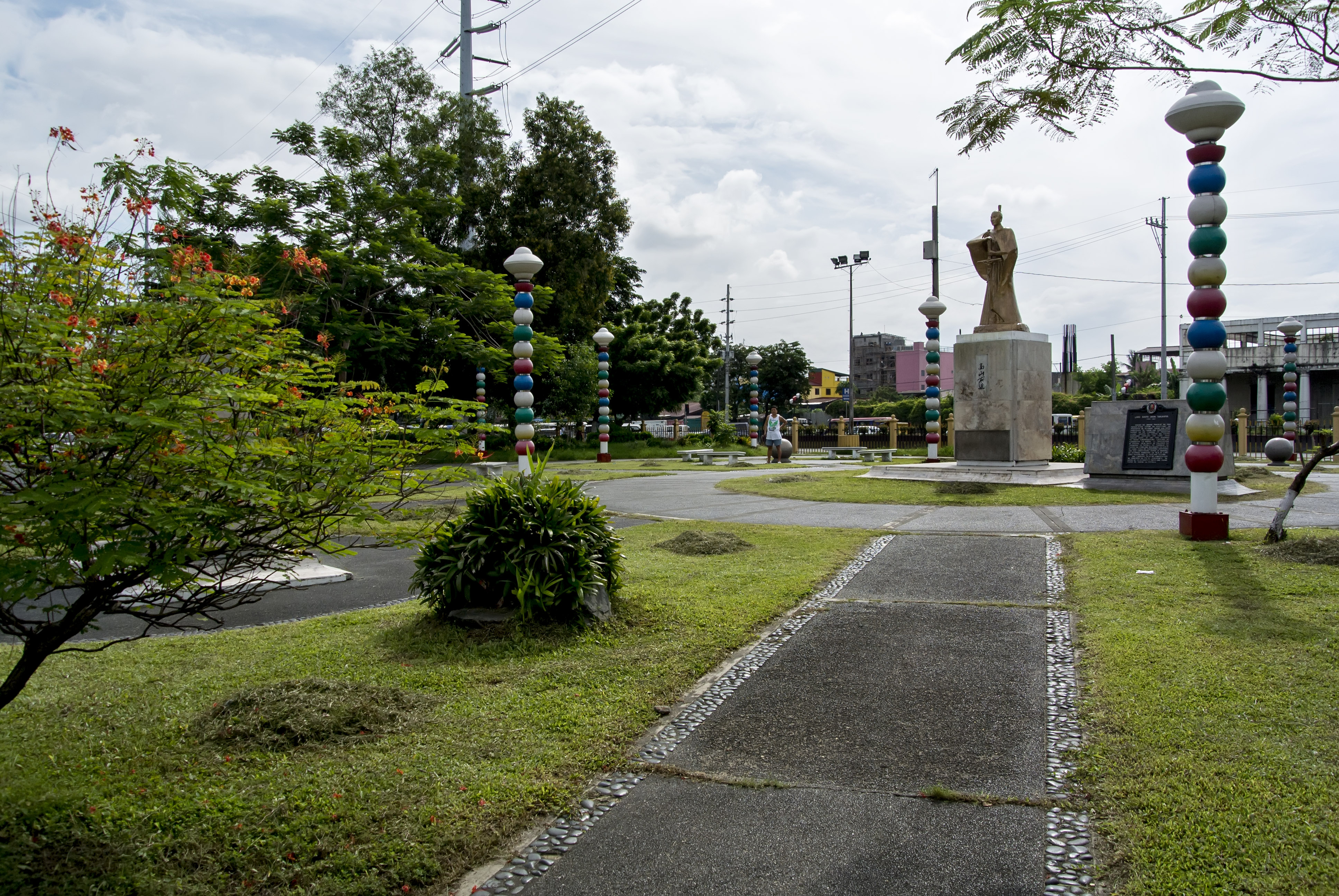
- The center of the plaza, photographed in 2013, is dominated by a statue of Dom Justo Takayama.
- Owner: City of Manila
- Location: Quirino Avenue, Paco; Manila, Philippines
- Interactive map of Plaza Dilao
- Coordinates: 14°34′51″N 120°59′58″E

Plaza Dilao is a public square in Paco, Manila, bounded by Quirino Avenue to the south and east and Plaza Dilao Road to the north and west. The former site of a Japanese settlement from the Spanish colonial era, the plaza prominently features a memorial commemorating Japanese Catholic kirishitan daimyō Dom Justo Takayama, who settled there in 1615. It is one of two open public spaces in Paco, the other being Paco Park.

Plaza Dilao is one of five freedom parks in the City of Manila, where protests and rallies may be held without requiring permission from local authorities.

== History ==
In Spanish colonial times, Paco (originally Dilao) was home to one of two Japanese settlements in Manila, with the other in San Miguel. While the Japanese community of Plaza Dilao began with Dom Justo Takayama and his family settling in the surrounding area after they were exiled from Japan in 1615, most Japanese in Manila at the time were settled around the area now occupied by the Philippine Normal University. However, in 1762, the Japanese residents of Manila were later relocated here by the Spanish authorities, although after that, the community's population began to decline owing to reduced Japanese immigration to the Philippines and Japan's policy of sakoku. It is believed that the presence of the Japanese community around the plaza eventually led it to be called "Plaza Dilao", referring to the yellowish (dilaw in Tagalog) skin tone of the area's inhabitants.

During the American period, Plaza Dilao became a transport center with the construction of Paco railway station in 1915, directly across from the plaza. During World War II, the area was the site of an intense battle between Japanese and joint Filipino and American forces led by Cleto Rodriguez. The plaza remained a transport center when Manila Mayor Joseph Estrada in 2013 ordered a ban on city buses entering Manila, wherein buses temporarily terminated at the plaza instead of their usual terminus at the Liwasang Bonifacio.

== Surrounding buildings and structures ==
Aside from Paco railway station, two prominent organizations in the Philippines are headquartered near Plaza Dilao. The Philippine Columbian Association (PCA), the Philippines' oldest sporting club, relocated its headquarters to the plaza on April 1, 1979, while the Asociación de Damas de Filipinas (Ladies' Association of the Philippines) is located close to the plaza along Quirino Avenue Extension, having been in the same place since its establishment in 1913. The Paco substation of Meralco, a part of the Sucat–Paco–Araneta–Balintawak Transmission Line of National Grid Corporation of the Philippines (NGCP), is located west of the plaza. Metro Manila Skyway Stage 3's Quirino southbound off-ramp and Plaza Dilao southbound on-ramp are located around the plaza.
