= Camiguin General Hospital =

Government hospital in Camiguin, Philippines

Geography
- Location: Mambajao, Camiguin, Northern Mindanao, Philippines
- Coordinates: 9°14′54″N 124°43′18″E

Organization
- Funding: Government hospital
- Type: tertiary level hospital

The Camiguin General Hospital is a government hospital in the Philippines. It is located in Mambajao, Camiguin.
