= Segundo Gastón =

Filipino politician (1887-1939)

The Honorable Segundo Gastón
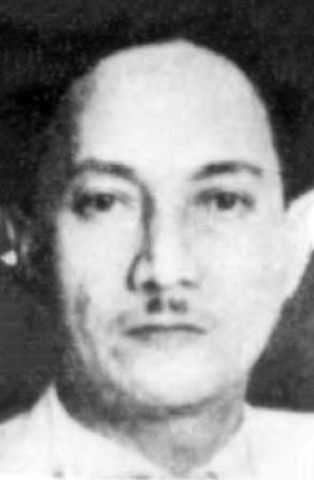
- Gastón in 1934

Member of the House of Representatives from Misamis Oriental's at-large district
- In office June 5, 1934 – September 16, 1935
- Preceded by: Isidro Vamenta
- Succeeded by: León Borromeo

Member of the House of Representatives from Misamis's 1st district
- In office June 2, 1925 – June 5, 1928
- Preceded by: José Artadi
- Succeeded by: Silvino Maestrado

Governor of Misamis
- In office 1923–1925
- Preceded by: Juan Valdeconcha Roa
- Succeeded by: Gregorio A. Peláez

Mayor of Cagayan de Misamis
- In office 1916–1919
- Preceded by: Uldarico Akut
- Succeeded by: Pedro P. Mabulay

Personal details
- Born: Segundo Gastón y Soriba; June 2, 1887 Silay, Negros Occidental, Captaincy General of the Philippines
- Died: 1939 (aged 51–52)
- Party: Democrata

Segundo Gastón y Soriba (June 2, 1887 – 1939) was the mayor of Cagayan de Misamis from 1916 to 1919, Governor of Misamis from 1923 to 1925, and Representative of Misamis's 1st district from 1925 to 1928 and of Misamis Oriental's lone district from 1934 to 1935. The Gaston Park in Cagayan de Oro is named after him. The National Assembly of the Philippines made a resolution about his passing for his work as a representative in the seventh and tenth Philippine legislatures.

Political offices
Preceded by Uldarico Akut	Mayor of Cagayan de Misamis; 1916–1922	Succeeded by Pedro P. Mabulay
Preceded by Juan Roa Valdeconcha	Governor of Misamis; 1923–1925	Succeeded by Gregorio A. Pelaez
House of Representatives of the Philippines
Preceded by José Artadi	Representative, Misamis's 1st district 1925–1928	Succeeded by Silvino Maestrado
Preceded by Isidro Vamenta	Representative, Misamis Oriental; 1934–1935	Succeeded by León Borromeo as Assemblyman
