= Misamis's 2nd congressional district =

Former congressional district in Misamis, Philippines

Misamis's 2nd congressional district was one of the two congressional districts of the Philippines in the formerly undivided province of Misamis. It was created ahead of the 1907 Philippine Assembly elections and initially comprised the municipalities west of Macajalar Bay and in the northeast Zamboanga peninsula and Panguil Bay regions, namely Cagayan, Initao, Jimenez, Langaran, Misamis and Oroquieta. It was represented in all three meetings of the Philippine Assembly from 1907 to 1916 and the first five meetings of the House of Representatives under the Insular Government of the Philippine Islands from 1916 to 1931.

The district was represented by a total of seven representatives throughout its existence. It was abolished in 1931 after Misamis was split between the new provinces of Misamis Occidental and Misamis Oriental created through Act No. 3537 in 1930. It was last represented by Isidro Vamenta of the Nacionalista Consolidado who was also designated as the first representative for Misamis Occidental according to the legislative act.

== Representation history ==
| # | Image | Member | Term of office | | Legislature | Party | Electoral history | Constituent LGUs |
| # | Image | Member | Start | End | Legislature | Party | Electoral history | Constituent LGUs |
|---|---|---|---|---|---|---|---|---|
=== Misamis's 2nd district for the Philippine Assembly ===
District created January 9, 1907.
| 1 | | Manuel Corrales | October 16, 1907 | October 16, 1909 | 1st | Independent | Elected in 1907. | 1907–1912; Cagayan, Initao, Jimenez, Langaran, Misamis, Oroquieta |
| 2 | | Nicolás Capistrano | October 16, 1909 | October 16, 1916 | 2nd | Nacionalista | Elected in 1909. | 1907–1912; Cagayan, Initao, Jimenez, Langaran, Misamis, Oroquieta |
| 2 | | Nicolás Capistrano | October 16, 1909 | October 16, 1916 | 3rd | Nacionalista | Re-elected in 1912. | 1912–1916; Baliangao, Cagayan, Initao, Jimenez, Langaran, Misamis, Oroquieta |
=== Misamis's 2nd district for the House of Representatives of the Philippine Islands ===
| 3 | | Ramón Neri | October 16, 1916 | June 3, 1919 | 4th | Nacionalista | Elected in 1916. | 1916–1922; Aloran, Baliangao, Cagayan, Initao, Jimenez, Misamis, Oroquieta, Plaridel |
| 4 | | Fortunato Clavano | June 3, 1919 | June 6, 1922 | 5th | Independent | Elected in 1919. | 1916–1922; Aloran, Baliangao, Cagayan, Initao, Jimenez, Misamis, Oroquieta, Plaridel |
| 5 | | Anselmo Bernard | June 6, 1922 | June 2, 1925 | 6th | Independent | Elected in 1922. | 1922–1928; Aloran, Baliangao, Cagayan, Initao, Jimenez, Loculan, Misamis, Oroquieta, Plaridel, Tudela |
| 6 | | Teogenes Vélez | June 2, 1925 | June 5, 1928 | 7th | Demócrata | Elected in 1925. | 1922–1928; Aloran, Baliangao, Cagayan, Initao, Jimenez, Loculan, Misamis, Oroquieta, Plaridel, Tudela |
| 7 | | Isidro Vamenta | June 5, 1928 | June 2, 1931 | 8th | Nacionalista; Consolidado | Elected in 1928. Redistricted to Misamis Oriental's at-large district. | 1928–1931; Aloran, Baliangao, Cagayan, Initao, Jimenez, Loculan, Lourdes, Lumbia, Misamis, Oroquieta, Plaridel, Taglimao, Tudela |
District dissolved into Misamis Occidental's at-large district and Misamis Oriental's at-large district.

== See also ==
- Legislative districts of Misamis Occidental
- Legislative districts of Misamis Oriental
