= Tirso Neri =

Filipino politician

Tirso Neri was the second mayor of the Cagayan de Misamis. He featured prominently as a revolutionary leader during the Philippine revolution. He opened the streets around the present Divisoria. He served as mayor from 1901 to 1903.

Preceded by Toribio Chavez	Mayor of Cagayan de Misamis; 1901–1903	Succeeded by Cayetano Pacana
