= Battle of Makahambus Hill =

1900 battle of the Philippine–American War

- Part of Philippine–American War
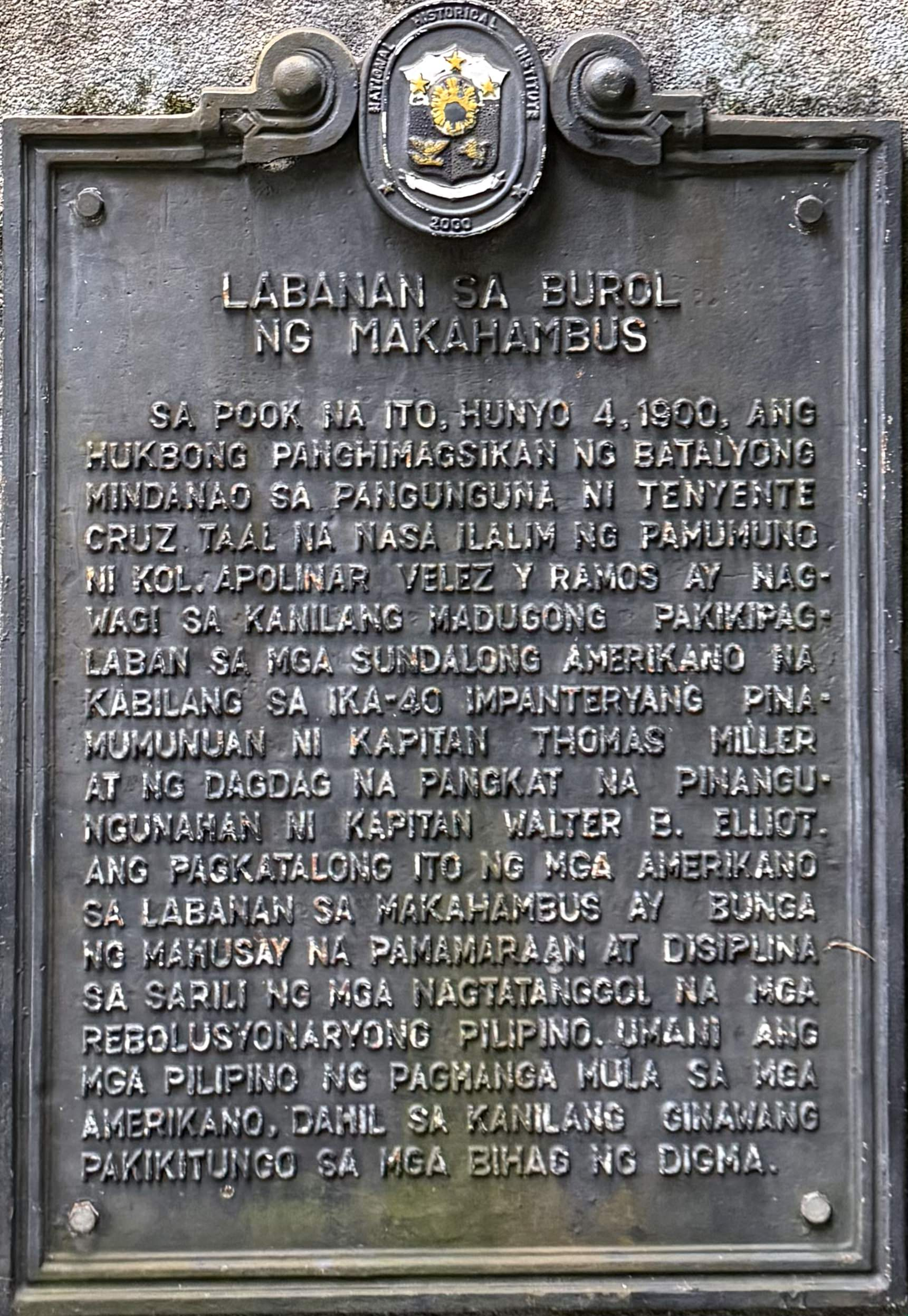
- National historical marker installed in 2000
Date	June 4, 1900
Location	Cagayan de Oro, Mindanao
Result	Filipino victory

Belligerents
First Philippine Republic	United States

Commanders and leaders
(First Philippine Republic) Lt. Cruz Taal (First Philippine Republic) Col. Apolinar Velez	(United States) Cpt. Walter B. Elliot (United States) Cpt. Thomas Millar

Strength
200 soldiers 2 cannon	40th Infantry Regiment

Casualties and losses
1 killed 3 wounded	10 killed 12 wounded

The Battle of Makahambus Hill was one of the victories won by the Filipinos over the Americans during the Philippine–American War. It was fought on June 4, 1900, in Cagayan de Misamis (now Cagayan de Oro). The Filipinos were under the command of Colonel Apolinar Velez of the Western Mindanao Division. Most of them were volunteers apart from some Filipino army men who joined.

== Background ==
Atop Makahambus Hill near Cagayan de Misamis stood a small fort that served as the headquarters of the Western Mindanao Division of the Philippine Revolutionary Army. This strategic stronghold was fortified by Filipino forces during the Philippine-American War, and it played a critical role in the defense of the area. The fort’s defenses were bolstered by two cannons left behind by Spanish forces following their departure from the region.

Recognizing its importance, Captain Walter B. Elliot and Captain Thomas Millar of the 40th Infantry Regiment of the United States Army identified the fort as a potential base for Filipino operations to disrupt American supply lines. Determined to neutralize this threat, they planned an attack on the stronghold, leading to the ensuing confrontation at Makahambus Hill.

== Battle ==
On June 4, 1900, Captain Elliot ordered an assault on the fort at Makahambus Hill, a stronghold situated atop a steep and heavily fortified hill. Recognizing the fort's formidable defenses, the American forces initially attempted to negotiate a surrender from the Filipino defenders. The Filipinos responded with a barrage of cannon and rifle fire, forcing the Americans to retreat down the hill.

The Filipino forces had prepared the terrain with cunning defensive measures, including booby-trapped pits concealed with foliage and bristling with sharpened bamboo spears, which inflicted heavy casualties on the advancing American troops. Despite repeated counterattacks, the Americans were unable to breach the fort's defenses and were repelled by continuous rifle fire from the entrenched Filipino forces. Ultimately, the American forces were forced to retreat, leaving behind many of their dead and wounded on the battlefield. This decisive victory for the Filipinos highlighted their tactical ingenuity and the effectiveness of their defensive preparations.

== Aftermath ==
The disaster prompted Maj. Gen. Arthur MacArthur Jr. to write a reprimand of Captains Elliot and Millar:

“The palpable mismanagement in this affair consists in not having reconnoitered the enemy’s position, but there appears to be no means of reaching a force intrenched, as was this one, in a carefully selected position, which must be approached in single file through a pathless jungle, nor any reason why it should be attacked at all, because, under the circumstances, it does not threaten our troops nor any natives under their protection, and it is sufficient to keep it under observation.”

American losses totaled as many as 22 dead and wounded. The Filipinos, however, suffered only 1 killed and 3 wounded, making this battle a one-sided victory for the Filipinos during the war.

== See also ==
- Battle of Cagayan de Misamis
