= Mambajao =

Capital of Camiguin, Philippines

- Municipality
- Municipality of Mambajao
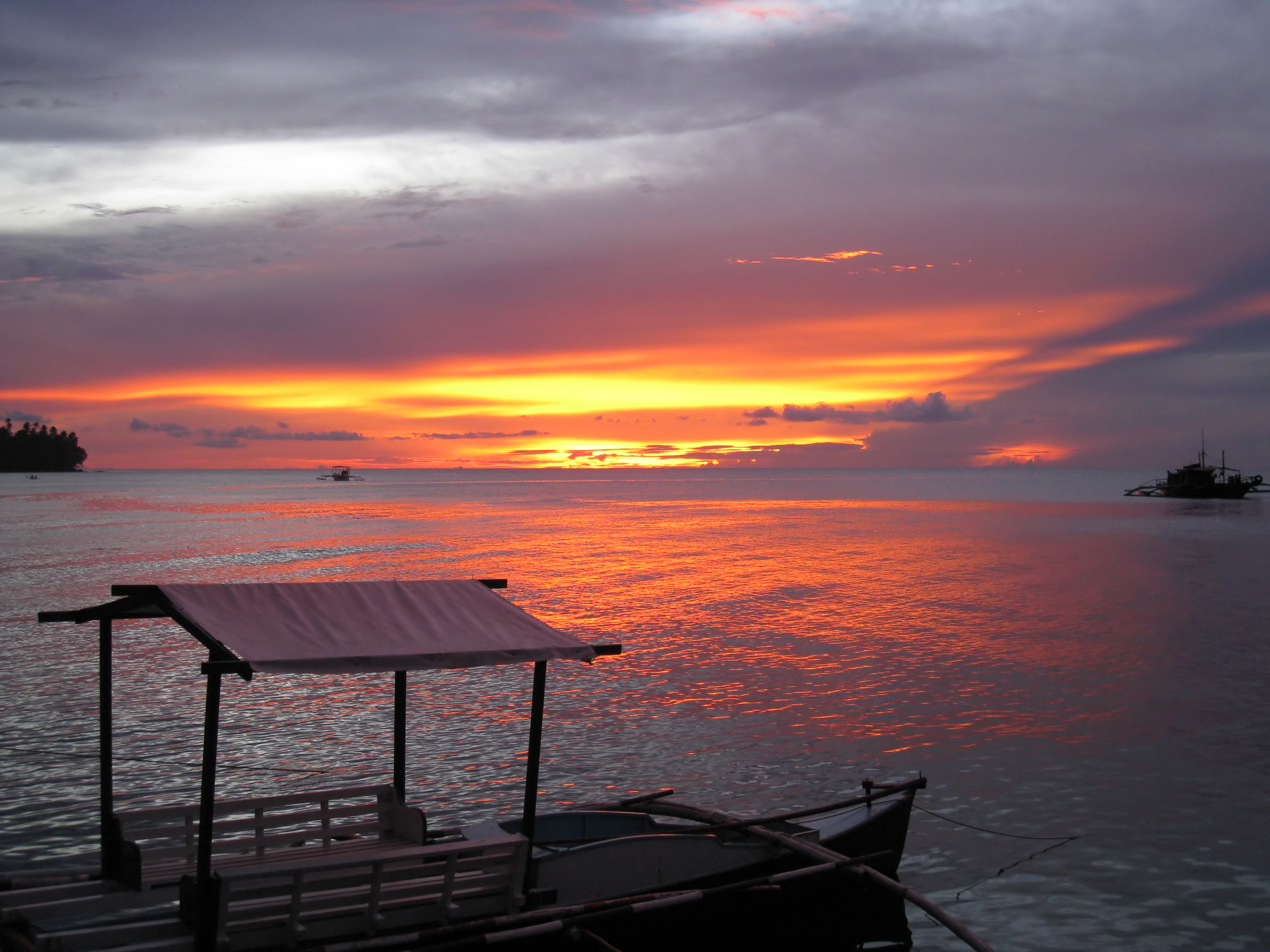
- Sunset at Mambajao

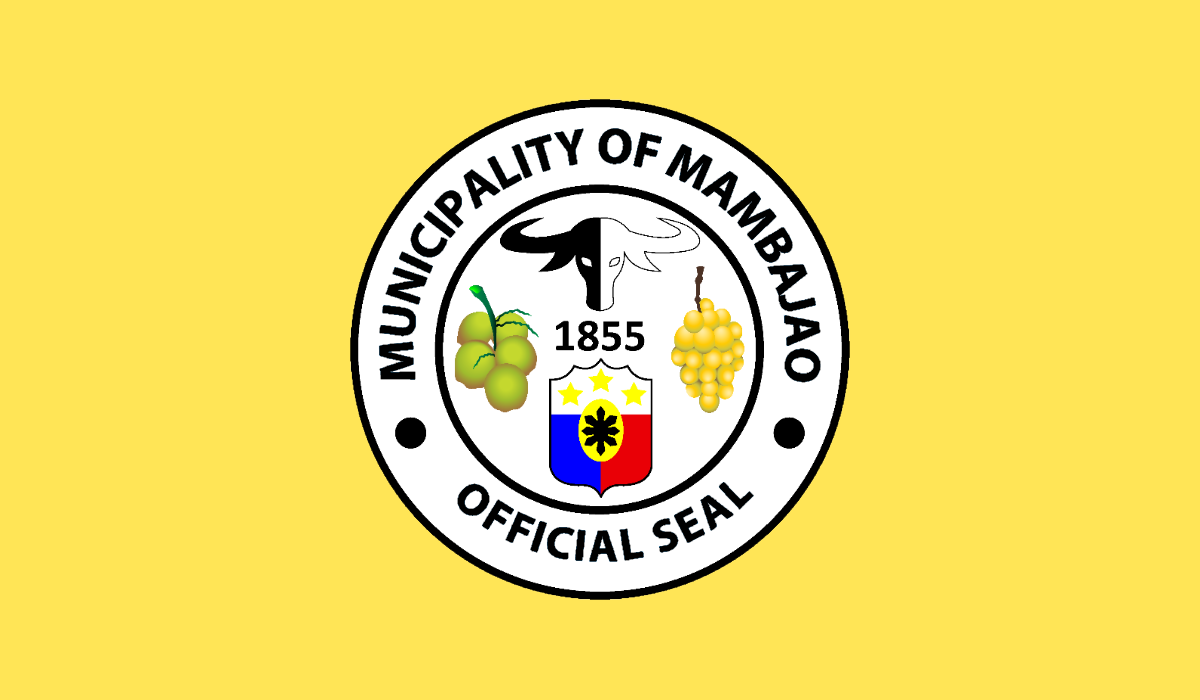
- Flag Seal
- Nickname: Lanzones Capital of the Philippines
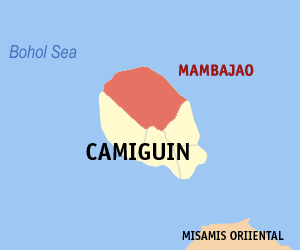
- Map of Camiguin with Mambajao highlighted
- Interactive map of Mambajao
- Location within the Philippines
- Coordinates: 9°15′N 124°43′E
- Country: Philippines
- Region: Northern Mindanao
- Province: Camiguin
- District: Lone district
- Founded: July 6, 1855
- Barangays: 15 (see Barangays)

Government
  - Type: Sangguniang Bayan
  - Mayor: Yñigo Jesus D. Romualdo (Lakas)
  - Vice Mayor: Robert Jones H. Closas (Lakas)
  - Representative: Jurdin Jesus M. Romualdo (Lakas)
  - Municipal Council: Members: Lander Jun O. Cutab; Rex Anthony S. Vivares; Argenito E. Sabacajan Jr.; Nelpher C. Catacutan; Aileen C. Grado; Emmanuel A. Aranas; Zita M. Abellare; Rogelio O. Salugsugan Jr.
  - Electorate: 27,913 voters (2025)

Area
  - Total: 89.00 km^{2} (34.36 sq mi)
- Elevation: 50 m (160 ft)
- Highest elevation: 1,619 m (5,312 ft)
- Lowest elevation: 0 m (0 ft)

Population (2024 census)
  - Total: 41,782
  - Density: 469.5/km^{2} (1,216/sq mi)
  - Households: 9,351

Economy
  - Income class: 2nd municipal income class
  - Poverty incidence: 11.61% (2023)
  - Revenue: ₱ 222.7 million (2024)
  - Assets: ₱ 428.4 million (2024)
  - Expenditure: ₱ 211 million (2024)
  - Liabilities: ₱ 112.4 million (2024)

Service provider
  - Electricity: Camiguin Electric Cooperative (CAMELCO)
- Time zone: UTC+8 (PST)
- ZIP code: 9100
- PSGC: 1001804000
- IDD : area code: +63 (0)88
- Native languages: Kinamigin; Cebuano; Tagalog
- Website: www.mambajao-cam.gov.ph

Mambajao, officially the Municipality of Mambajao, is a municipality and capital of the province of Camiguin, Philippines. According to the 2024 census, it has a population of 41,094 people making it the most populous town in the province.

== Etymology ==
Mambajao is from Visayan mambahaw (archaic form of mamahaw), meaning "to eat breakfast"; from the root word bahaw, "leftover rice from [last night]".

== History ==
On January 4, 1855, Mambajao was separated from Catarman, and by July 6 that year it was proclaimed as a town, with Fr. Valero Salvo as its first parish priest. On July 17, 1864, tremors were felt across the town, which were signs of an ongoing activity within an undersea volcano near Catarman. By May 1, 1871, the volcano erupted, decimating the town of Catarman, which lead to almost all of its inhabitants moving to Mambajao. In January 1872, Barrio Agojo was transferred from Guinsiliban to Mambajao.

The town's principal crop in the 19th century was abaca, while coffee and cacao were mostly produced for local consumption. Sporadic fires were started from April 13, 1865, until 1881 by people attempting to burn down the town. By the 1880s, the town had become cosmopolitan, for its population then included Spaniards, Tagalogs, Cebuanos, Leyteños, Samareños, Ilocanos, and others in addition to Camigueños and Boholanos.

By the virtue of Act No. 951, issued by the Philippine Commission on October 21, 1903, which reduced the number of municipalities in the then-undivided Misamis (Camiguin's mother province) from 24 to 10, Catarman, Sagay, and Mahinog became part of Mambajao.

In 1942, the Japanese forces landed in the town of Mambajao.

On November 19, 2018, the old municipal hall of Mambajao was destroyed by a fire after it was spread to its second floor.

== Geography ==
=== Barangays ===
Mambajao is politically subdivided into 16 barangays. Each barangay consists of puroks while some have sitios.

- Tupsan
- Benhaan
- Magting
- Anito
- Abatukam
- Balbagon
- Pandan
- Soro-Soro
- Poblacion
- Baylao
- Tagdo
- Kuguita
- Bug ong
- Agoho
- Yumbing
- Naasag

=== Climate ===
Climate data for Mambajao, Camiguin
Month	Jan	Feb	Mar	Apr	May	Jun	Jul	Aug	Sep	Oct	Nov	Dec	Year
Mean daily maximum °C (°F)	28 (82)	29 (84)	30 (86)	31 (88)	31 (88)	30 (86)	30 (86)	30 (86)	30 (86)	29 (84)	29 (84)	29 (84)	30 (85)
Mean daily minimum °C (°F)	23 (73)	22 (72)	23 (73)	23 (73)	24 (75)	25 (77)	24 (75)	24 (75)	24 (75)	24 (75)	23 (73)	23 (73)	24 (74)
Average precipitation mm (inches)	102 (4.0)	85 (3.3)	91 (3.6)	75 (3.0)	110 (4.3)	141 (5.6)	121 (4.8)	107 (4.2)	111 (4.4)	144 (5.7)	169 (6.7)	139 (5.5)	1,395 (55.1)
Average rainy days	18.6	14.8	16.5	16.7	23.9	26.4	25.6	24.1	24.4	26.3	23.7	20.5	261.5
Source: Meteoblue

== Demographics ==
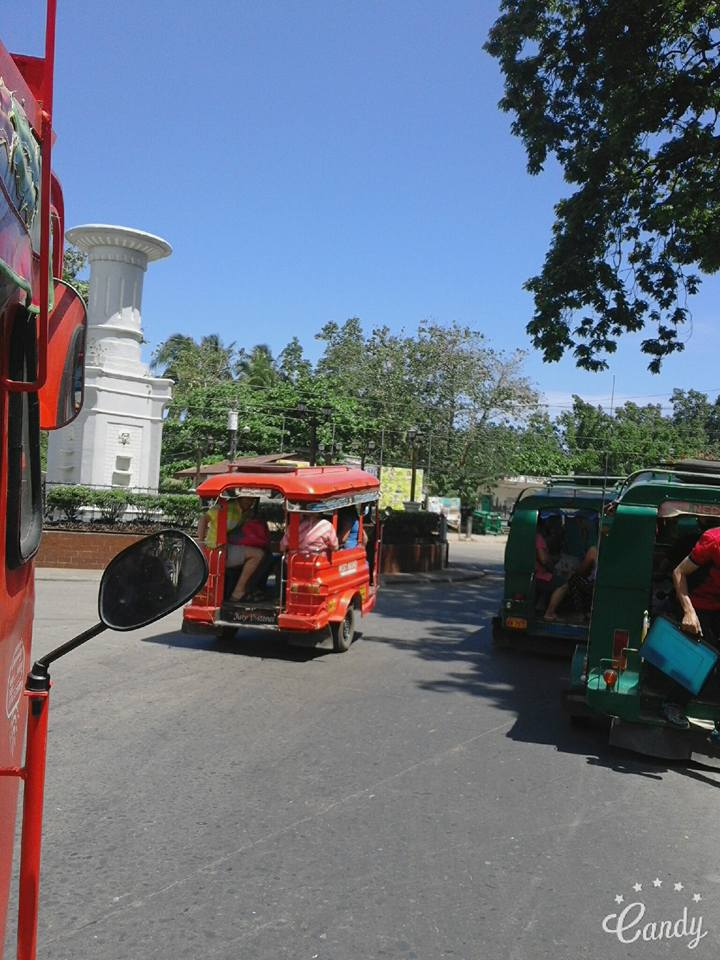
Motorized tricycles are the main mode of transport in the municipality

Population census of Mambajao
Year	Pop.	±% p.a.
1903	14,446	—
1918	21,308	+2.62%
1939	21,414	+0.02%
1948	25,193	+1.82%
1960	15,288	−4.08%
1970	18,673	+2.02%
1975	19,183	+0.54%
1980	21,337	+2.15%
1990	25,207	+1.68%
1995	27,770	+1.83%
2000	30,806	+2.25%
2007	35,308	+1.90%
2010	36,435	+1.15%
2015	38,735	+1.17%
2020	41,094	+1.25%
Source: Philippine Statistics Authority

In the 2024 census, the population of Mambajao was 41,094 people, with a density of 460 inhabitants per square kilometre or 1,200 inhabitants per square mile.

== Economy ==
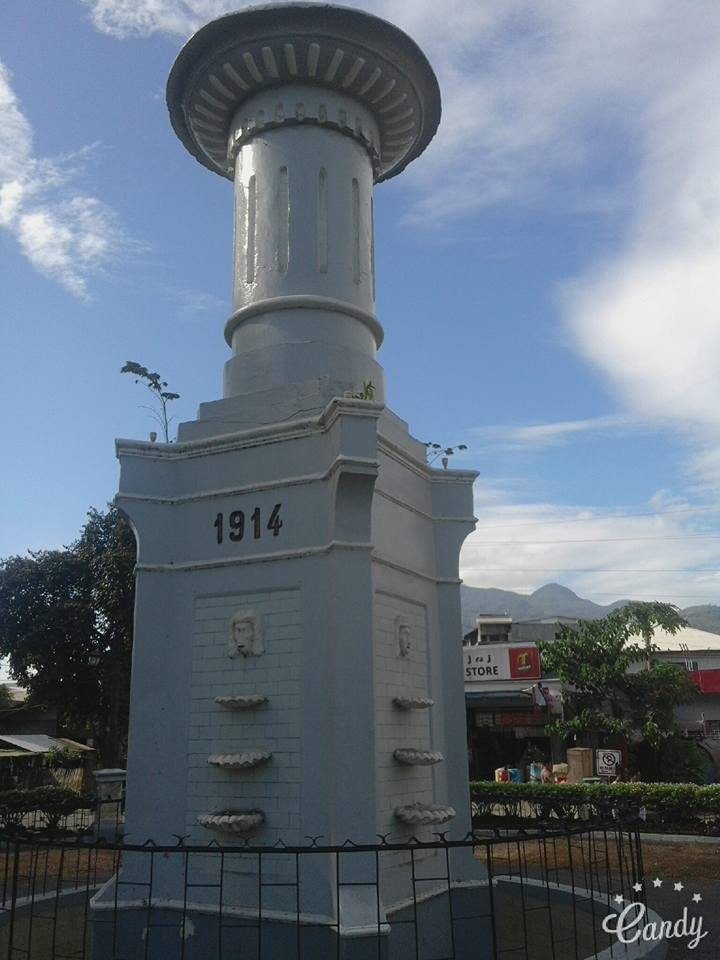
Town monument and rotunda

Poverty incidence of Mambajao (%)

Source: Philippine Statistics Authority

== Infrastructure ==
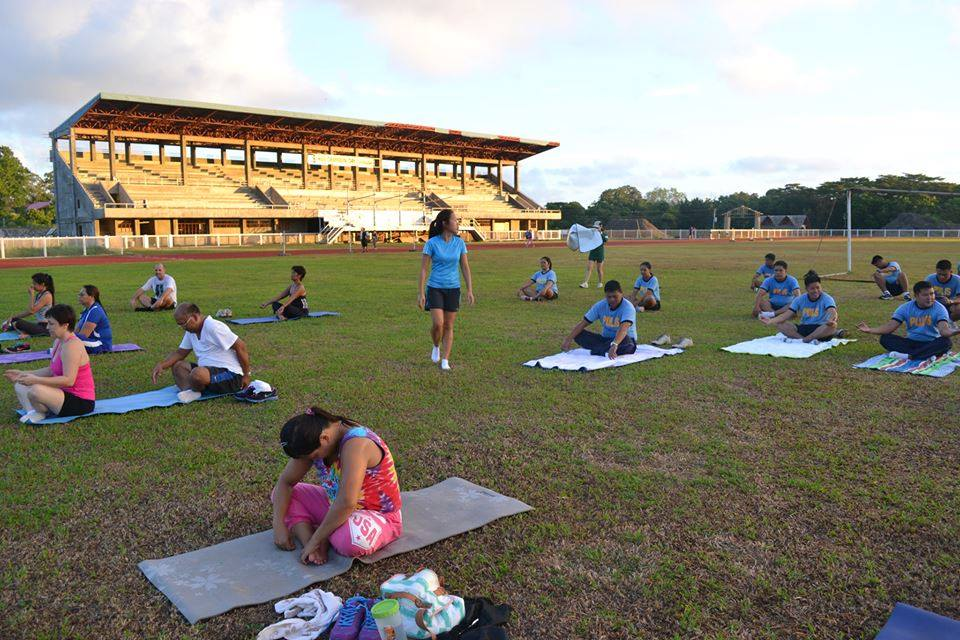
Camiguin Sports Complex

The Camiguin Sports Complex (Also known as Cong. Pedro Palarca-Romualdo Tourism and Sports Complex) is a sports complex located in Mambajao, and hosts to the 2016 Northern Mindanao Regional Athletic Meet, and Lanzones Festival events.

The main campus of the Camiguin Polytechnic State College is located in Mambajao.

== Notable personalities ==
- Mary "Maymay" Entrata, actress and singer who won the seventh edition of Pinoy Big Brother
