= Pedro Baculio =

Filipino lawyer and politician (1909–1962)

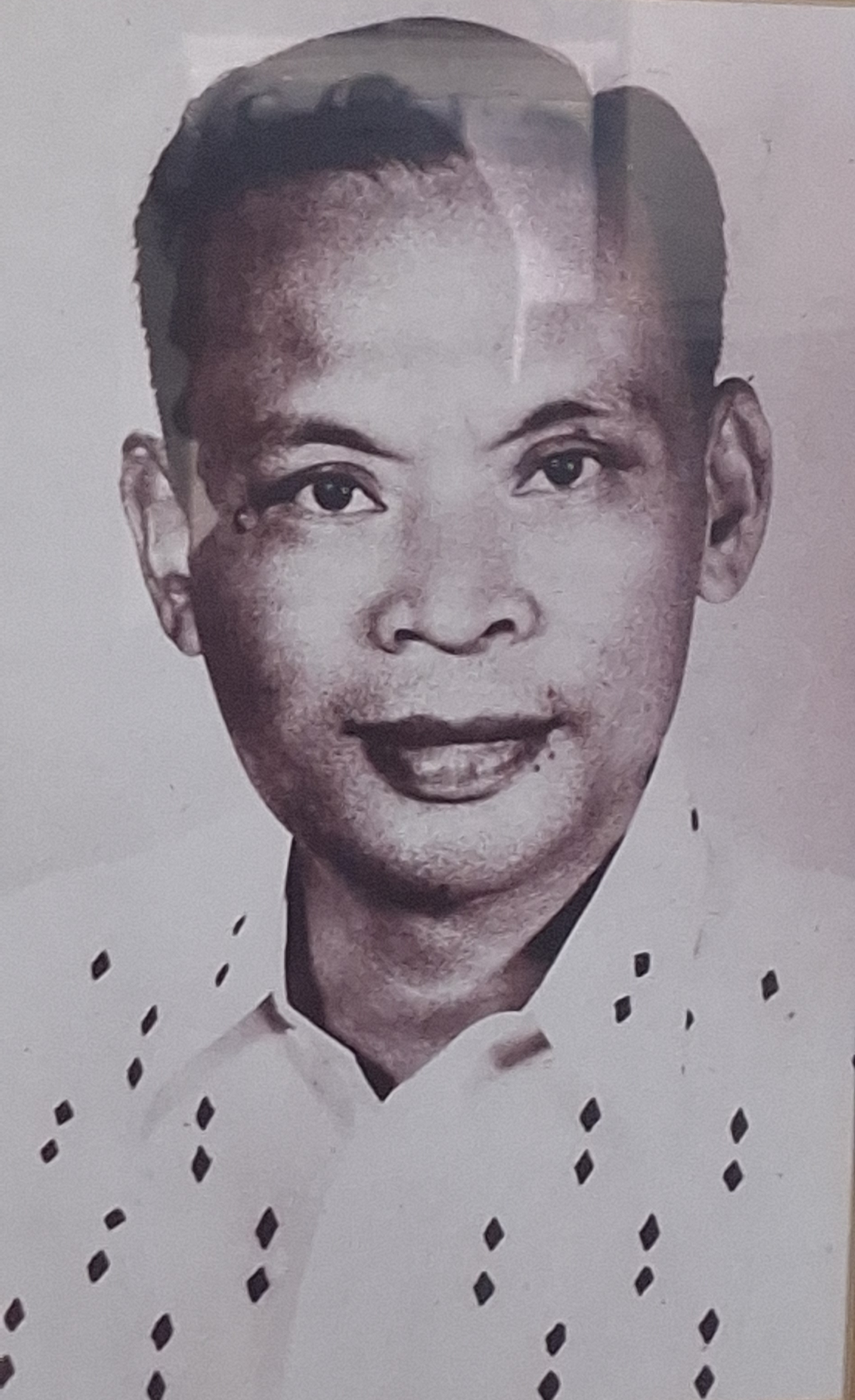

2nd Mayor of Cagayan de Oro
- In office 1953–1955
- Vice Mayor: Osmundo R. Waga
- Preceded by: Máximo Y. Suniel
- Succeeded by: Justiniano Borja

Member of the House of Representatives from Misamis Oriental's at-large district
- In office May 25, 1946 – December 30, 1949
- Preceded by: José Artadi
- Succeeded by: Emmanuel Pelaez

Governor of Misamis Oriental
- In office 1941–1945
- Preceded by: Gregorio A. Pelaez
- Succeeded by: Mariano Marbella

Personal details
- Born: Pedro Salvador Baculio; October 19, 1909
- Died: November 1, 1962 (aged 53)
- Party: Liberal

Pedro Salvador Baculio (October 19, 1909 – November 1, 1962) was a Filipino lawyer and politician. His father was a cattle rancher and copra farmer. He was the mayor of Cagayan de Oro from 1953 to 1955. He relinquished his post when his presidential candidate lost to incumbent President Elpidio Quirino. Baculio was also appointed as the acting provincial governor of Misamis Oriental on August 1, 1945. He also represented Misamis Oriental, which at that time included the Island of Camiguin and Cagayan de Oro, during the 1st Congress, from 1946 to 1949. In 1948, he authored the bills to create the City of Cagayan de Oro, Municipalities of Jasaan, Manticao and El Salvador in Misamis Oriental. In 1949, future Vice President Emmanuel Pelaez succeeded him as the representative of Misamis Oriental.

By 2007, his son authored the bill converting El Salvador into a city. A barangay in El Salvador City was named after him. Converting then Barangay Bolo-bolo to Barangay Pedro Sa. Baculio commonly known as P.S.B.

Preceded by Don Gregorio A. Pelaez	Governor of Misamis Oriental; 1941 - 1945	Succeeded by Mariano Ope Marbella
Preceded by Maximo Y. Suniel	Mayor of Cagayan de Oro; 1953 - 1955	Succeeded by Justiniano R. Borja
