= Apolinar Velez =

Leader in the Philippine Revolution and the Philippine-American War

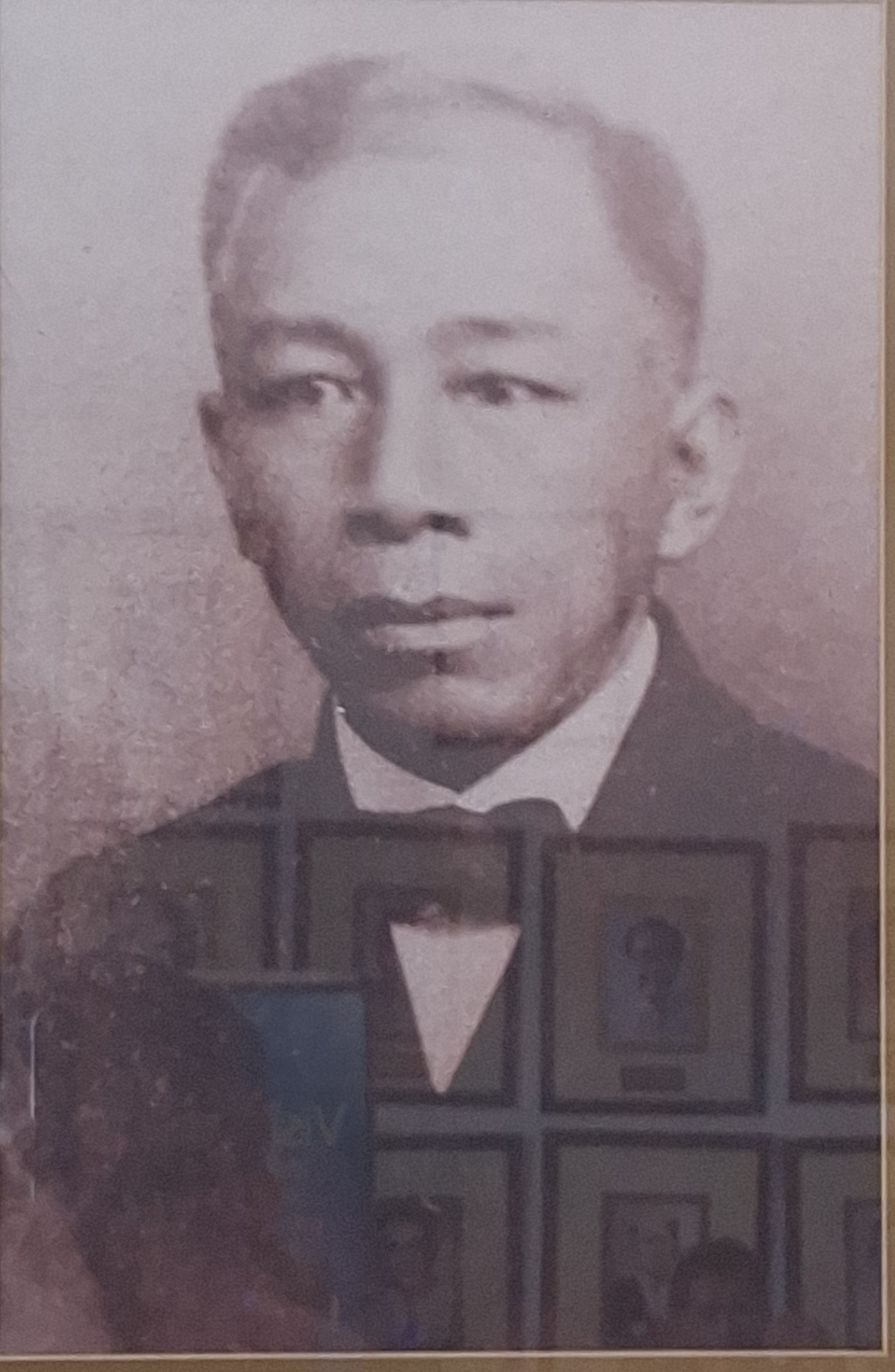
Official portrait of Colonel Apolinar Velez

Colonel Apolinar Velez y Ramos (July 23, 1865 – October 19, 1939) was the Mayor of Cagayan de Misamis From 1928 to 1931 and also the Governor of the Misamis Province from 1906 to 1909. He led the Filipinos during the Battle of Makahambus that resulted in the victory of the Filipinos.

== Early life and education ==
He was born on July 23, 1865, in Cagayan, Misamis. He was the son of Blas Velez and Saturnina Ramos.

He was educated at Fra. R. Zueco’s private school of Attorney Leoncio Roa, and S. Jis de Ortega’s college. In 1884, he was a clerk in the office of the court of first instance of Misamis. From 1886 to 1891, he held the positions of oficial de mesa, interpreter, and defensor de presos pobres.

Previous to that time, he held the post of second lieutenant of infantry of the Spanish army, and was decorated with the Medalla de Mindanao. In 1898, he was made chief of the division of justice of the provincial council of the Revolutionary Government two years later, he was promoted to the rank of major of the revolutionary army and chief of the battalion “El Mindanao.”

== Political life ==
From 1901 to 1906, Don Apolinar Velez held the post of provincial secretary after which he was elected governor of Misamis for two terms.

During the 1928 election, in response to the demands of his sympathizers, he ran for the post of municipal president of Cagayan, and was easily elected. He ran for the position of member of the provincial board last June and was elected to hold office for the next three years.

== Personal life ==
Velez is known by his nickname Senor Cayong. Don Apolinar spends his leisure hours playing chess, billiard, or reading books. He plays piano, like everybody else in the family. He married Leona Chaves y Roa on May 10, 1887, thus joining two of the biggest families in Misamis.

Preceded by Vicente P. Castro	Mayor of Cagayan de Misamis; 1928–1931	Succeeded by Lucio S. Ramos

Preceded by Manuel Corrales Roa	Governor of Misamis; 1906–1909	Succeeded by Ricardo Reyes Barrientos
