= Misamis Oriental's at-large congressional district =

Legislative district of the Philippines

Misamis Oriental's at-large congressional district is an obsolete congressional district of the Philippines that encompassed the entire province of Misamis Oriental. It was created ahead of the 1931 Philippine House of Representatives elections following the 1929 division of Misamis into two provinces. The district elected one member in each of the final two meetings of the Philippine Assembly from 1931 to 1935 and in the two meetings of Commonwealth National Assembly from 1935 to 1941.

Two members represented the district in the Second Republic National Assembly from 1943 to 1944. It returned to a single-member constituency for the restored House of Representatives in both the Commonwealth Congress from 1945 to 1946 and all seven meetings post-independence until 1972. The district was last contested at the 1984 Philippine parliamentary election when its capital city of Cagayan de Oro also began to elect its own separate representative. It was abolished following the 1987 reapportionment under a new constitution.

== Representation history ==
#	Term of office		Legislature	Single seat							
#	Start	End	Legislature	Image	Member	Party	Electoral history				
=== Misamis Oriental's at-large district for the House of Representatives of the Philippine Islands ===
District created November 2, 1929.
1	June 2, 1931	June 5, 1934	9th		Isidro Vamenta	Nacionalista; Consolidado	Redistricted from Misamis's 2nd district and re-elected in 1931.				
2	June 5, 1934	September 16, 1935	10th		Segundo Gastón	Nacionalista; Demócrata Pro-Independencia	Elected in 1934.				
#	Term of office		National Assembly	Single seat							
#	Start	End	National Assembly	Image	Member	Party	Electoral history				
=== Misamis Oriental's at-large district for the National Assembly (Commonwealth of the Philippines) ===
3	September 16, 1935	December 30, 1938	1st		León Borromeo	Nacionalista; Democrático	Elected in 1935.				
(1)	December 30, 1938	December 30, 1941	2nd		Isidro Vamenta	Nacionalista	Elected in 1938.				
#	Term of office		National Assembly	Seat A				Seat B			
#	Start	End	National Assembly	Image	Member	Party	Electoral history	Image	Member	Party	Electoral history
=== Misamis Oriental's at-large district for the National Assembly (Second Philippine Republic) ===
District re-created September 7, 1943.
–	September 25, 1943	February 2, 1944	3rd		Isidro Vamenta	KALIBAPI	Elected in 1943.		José Artadi	KALIBAPI	Appointed as an ex officio member.
#	Term of office		Common wealth Congress	Single seat				Seats eliminated			
#	Start	End	Common wealth Congress	Image	Member	Party	Electoral history	Seats eliminated			
=== Misamis Oriental's at-large district for the House of Representatives of the Commonwealth of the Philippines ===								Seats eliminated			
District re-created May 24, 1945.								Seats eliminated			
4	June 11, 1945	May 25, 1946	1st		José Artadi	Nacionalista	Elected in 1941.	Seats eliminated			
#	Term of office		Congress	Single seat				Seats eliminated			
#	Start	End	Congress	Image	Member	Party	Electoral history	Seats eliminated			
=== Misamis Oriental's at-large district for the House of Representatives of the Philippines ===								Seats eliminated			
5	May 25, 1946	December 30, 1949	1st		Pedro Baculio	Liberal	Elected in 1946.	Seats eliminated			
6	December 30, 1949	December 30, 1953	2nd		Emmanuel Pelaez	Liberal	Elected in 1949.	Seats eliminated			
7	December 30, 1953	December 30, 1957	3rd		Ignacio S. Cruz	Nacionalista	Elected in 1953.	Seats eliminated			
8	December 30, 1957	December 30, 1961	4th		Fausto Dugenio	NCP	Elected in 1957.	Seats eliminated			
9	December 30, 1961	December 30, 1965	5th		Vicente B. de Lara	Liberal	Elected in 1961.	Seats eliminated			
(6)	December 30, 1965	November 14, 1967	6th		Emmanuel Pelaez	Independent	Elected in 1965. Resigned on election as senator.	Seats eliminated			
(6)	December 30, 1965	November 14, 1967	6th		Emmanuel Pelaez	Nacionalista	Elected in 1965. Resigned on election as senator.	Seats eliminated			
10	December 30, 1969	September 23, 1972	7th		Pedro N. Roa	Nacionalista	Elected in 1969. Removed from office after imposition of martial law.	Seats eliminated			
District dissolved into the nine-seat Region X's at-large district for the Interim Batasang Pambansa.
#	Term of office		Batasang Pambansa	Seat A				Seat B			
#	Start	End	Batasang Pambansa	Image	Member	Party	Electoral history	Image	Member	Party	Electoral history
=== Misamis Oriental's at-large district for the Regular Batasang Pambansa ===
District re-created February 1, 1984.
–	July 23, 1984	March 25, 1986	2nd		Homobono A. Adaza	Mindanao Alliance	Elected in 1984.		Concordio C. Diel	KBL	Elected in 1984.
District dissolved into Misamis Oriental's 1st and 2nd districts.

== See also ==
- Legislative districts of Misamis Oriental
