= Battle of Cagayan de Misamis =

1900 Filipino battle

- Part of Philippine–American War
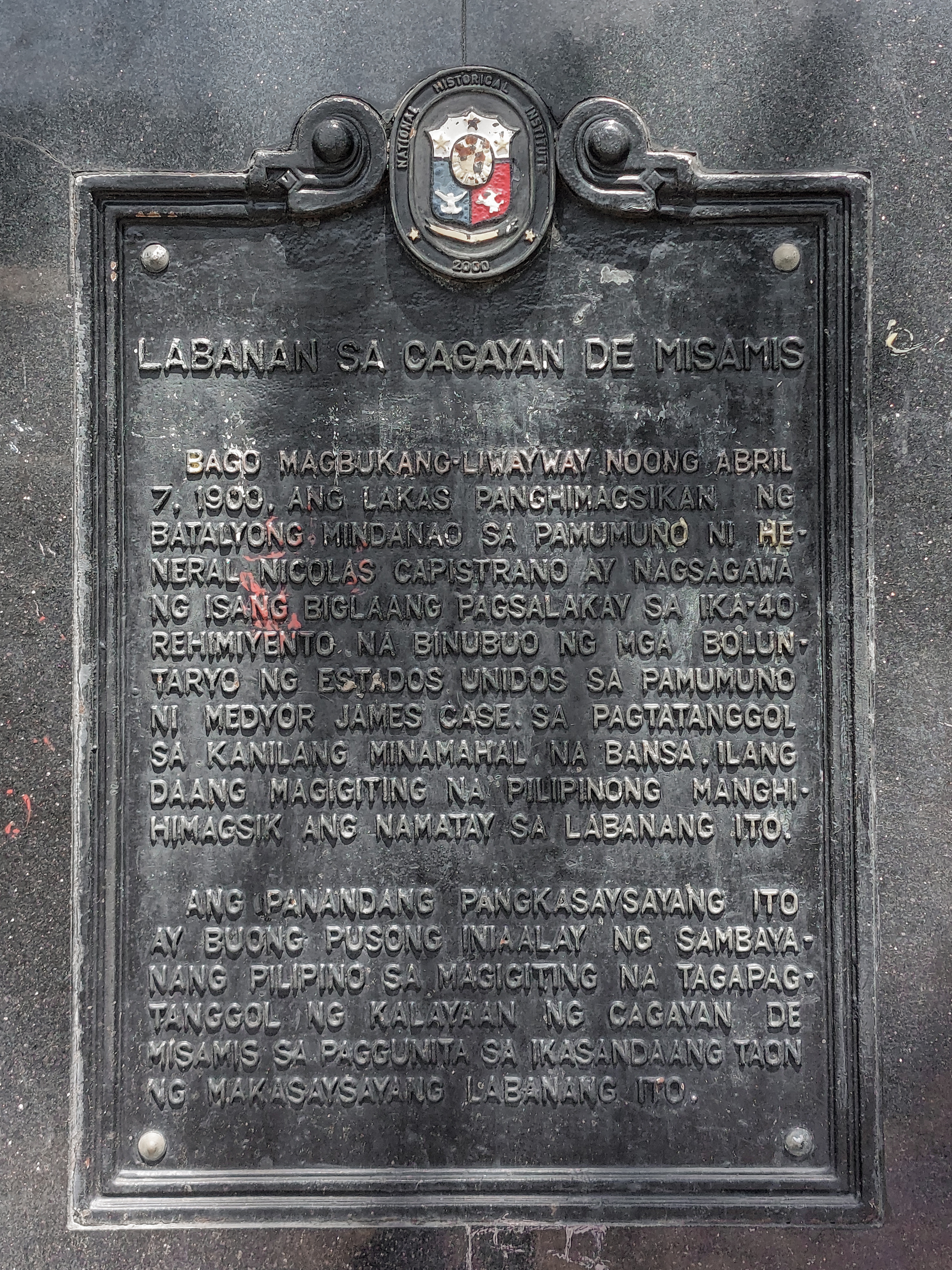
- Historical marker installed at Gaston Park in Cagayan de Oro
| Date | April 7, 1900 |
| Location | Cagayan de Misamis (now Cagayan de Oro), Mindanao, Philippines |
| Result | American victory |

Belligerents
| First Philippine Republic | United States |

Commanders and leaders
| Gen. Nicolas Capistrano | Col. Edward A. Godwin |

Casualties and losses
| 52 killed 9 wounded 10 captured | 4 killed 9 wounded |

The Battle of Cagayan de Misamis was fought on April 7, 1900, in the town of Cagayan de Misamis (now Cagayan de Oro) in Mindanao, Philippines, during the Philippine–American War. The Filipinos were under the command of General Nicolas Capistrano.

The surprise dawn attack was foiled when one of the lumad (ethnic minority) warriors shouted a battle cry as he killed an American sentry that aroused the American soldiers. The fighting was centered on the town plaza (now Gaston Park) where the American barracks were located.

General Capistrano, foreseeing imminent defeat, ordered the retreat of his men. The Americans pursued General Capistrano and his men to the edge of the town.

== See also ==
- Battle of Makahambus Hill
- Cagayan de Oro
