= Misamis (province) =

Former province of the Philippines

Coordinates: 8°09′N 123°46′E

- Province of the Philippines
- 1901–1929
- Location of the historical province of Misamis
- Capital: Cagayan de Oro
- Historical era: Colonial period
  - Established: 15 May 1901
  - Disestablished: 2 November 1929
Preceded by
| Misamis (district) |
Succeeded by
| Moro Province |
| Agusan |
| Misamis Occidental |
| Misamis Oriental |
- Today part of: Philippines · Misamis Occidental · Misamis Oriental · Camiguin · Bukidnon · Cotabato · Lanao del Norte · Lanao del Sur · Zamboanga del Norte · Zamboanga del Sur

Misamis was a province of the Philippines located in Mindanao. Originally a Spanish-era district, it became a chartered province on May 15, 1901 (Philippine Commission Act 128). The province was dissolved in 1929, when it was divided into two.

== History ==
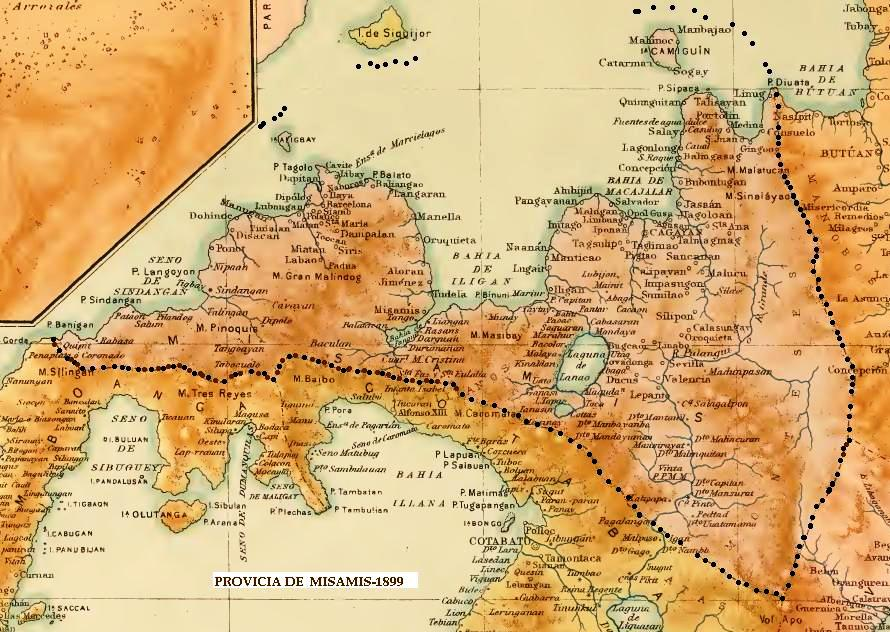
Boundary of Misamis until 1902

Misamis takes its name from an old settlement at the mouth of the Panguil Bay once populated by Subanen, now the city of Ozamiz. The name is believed to derive from the Subanen term kuyamis, a term for a sweet variety of coconut. However, as a result of continued raids by Moros from Lanao, the Subanens retreated into the interior and Visayan and Bukidnon settlers occupied the coast. By 1818, Misamis was organized as a province covering the region from Dapitan in the west, up to Gingoog in the east and as far as Cotabato and Lanao del Sur in the south. Effective control, however, was limited to the coast.

For most of the 17th and 18th centuries, Misamis remained vulnerable to the Moro slave raiders. Forts were constructed, the principal ones being in Misamis (Fuerte de la Concepcion y del Triunfo), Iligan and Cagayan de Misamis. The population of Misamis gradually increased during the 19th century due largely to the influx of settlers from Cebu, Bohol, Siquijor and Negros Oriental and doubled a century later with another influx of settlers from Luzon and other parts of Visayas. By the end of the 1700s, Misamis had 1,278 native families. By 1818, there were an additional three pure Spanish-Filipino families and 35 mixed Spanish-Filipino Mestizo families. It was also fortified and colonized by 100 Spanish soldiers.

Misamis used to be a part of Cebu. In 1818, it became a "corregimiento" made up of four "partidos" or divisions: Partido de Misamis, Partido de Dapitan, Partido de Cagayan and Partido de Catarman. During the latter part of the 19th century, Misamis was one of the six districts of Mindanao and, later, one of the seven districts in Mindanao and Sulu at the close of the Spanish era with Cagayan de Misamis (now Cagayan de Oro) as its capital. When it was still a part of the district of Cebu, there were twelve Spaniards and nine Filipinos who successively served as "governadore" with Mayor Carabello as the first governor in 1874.

In 1917, following the organization of the Department of Mindanao and Sulu, the province of Misamis lost the territory of Iligan to the province of Lanao. In 1929, the Philippine Legislature passed Act No. 3537 to dissolve the province and split it into Occidental Misamis and Oriental Misamis. The change took effect on January 1, 1930.

== List of governors ==
Misamis was headed by a governor.

| Governor | Term | Note | Ref. |
|---|---|---|---|
| Major José Caraballo | 1874–1876 | | |
| Lt. Col. Leopoldo Roldán | 1877–1883 | | |
| Lt. Col. Alberto Bacaj | 1883–1884 | | |
| Lt. Col. Luis Huertas | 1884–1886 | | |
| Lt. Col. Conde de Turealta | 1886–1887 | Served in an acting position. | |
| Lt. Col. Federico Tianta | 1887—1888 | | |
| Major Juan Zanón | 1888–1890 | | |
| Lt. Col. José de Tógores | 1890–1893 | | |
| Lt. Col. Juan de Frats | 1893–1894 | | |
| Capt. Ricardo Carmecerno | 1895–1896 | | |
| Lt. Col. Jose de Tógores | 1895–1896 | | |
| Lt. Col. Cristóbal de Aguilar | 1896–1898 | | |
| Cayetano Pacana | 1898–1899 | Served as gobernadorcillo. | |
| José Roa y Casas | 1899–1900 | Served as provincial president. | |
| Manuel Roa Corrales | 1901–1905 | | |
| Apolinar Velez | 1906–1909 | | |
| Ricardo Reyes Barrientos | 1910–1912 | | |
| Jose Reyes Barrientos | 1912–1916 | | |
| Isidro Rillas | 1917–1919 | | |
| Juan Valdeconcha Roa | 1920–1922 | | |
| Segundo Gastón | 1923–1925 | | |
| Don Gregorio A. Pelaez | 1926–1929 | Last governor of undivided Misamis. Continued as governor of Misamis Oriental until 1931. | |

== See also ==
- Misamis Occidental
- Misamis Oriental
- Iligan City
- Legislative districts of Misamis
