= Timpoong and Hibok-Hibok Natural Monument =

Natural monument in Camiguin, Philippines

- IUCN category III (natural monument or feature)
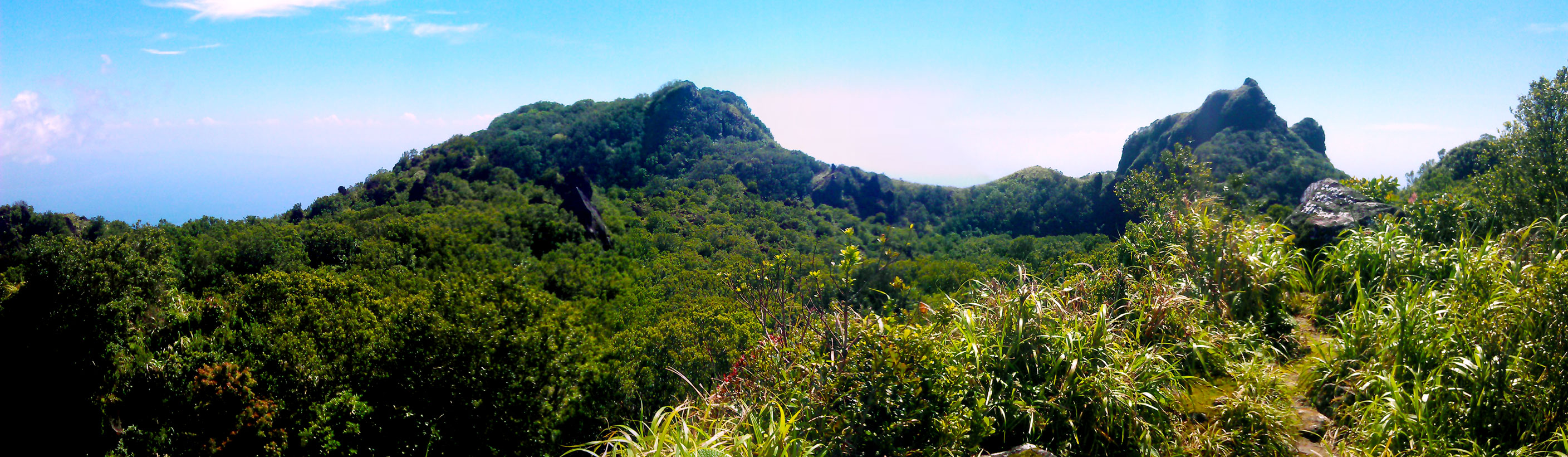
- Summit of Mount Hibok-Hibok

- Location within Mindanao mainland Location within Philippines
- Location: Camiguin, Philippines
- Nearest city: Gingoog
- Coordinates: 9°10′21″N 124°43′24″E
- Area: 2,227.62 hectares (5,504.6 acres)
- Established: March 9, 2004
- Governing body: Department of Environment and Natural Resources

Timpoong and Hibok-Hibok Natural Monument is a Philippine natural monument located in Northern Mindanao on the island of Camiguin. It encompasses two scenic volcanoes in the Camiguin Mindanao range that span the core of Camiguin: Mount Mambajao, which includes Mount Timpoong, its highest peak, and Mount Catarman, which includes Mount Hibok-Hibok, the island's only currently active volcano. Established in 2004 through Proclamation No. 570 issued by President Gloria Arroyo, the natural monument is an important watershed containing the only remaining rainforest on Camiguin. It supports a variety of endemic flora and fauna and is also noted for its waterfalls, rivers and springs.

During the 13th ASEAN Ministerial Meeting on the Environment in 2015, the Timpoong and Hibok-Hibok monument was formally declared an ASEAN Heritage Park.

== Description ==
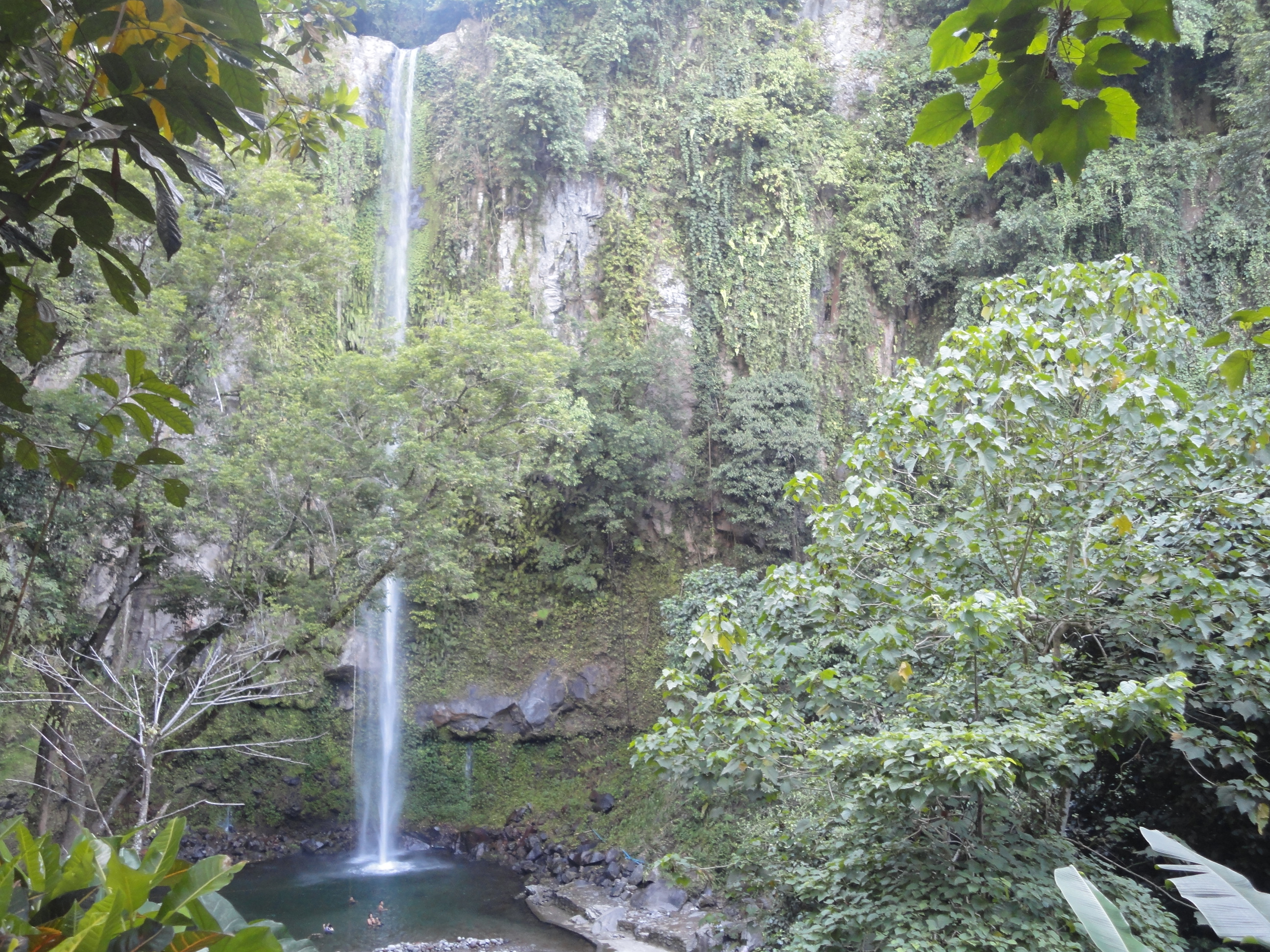
Katibawasan Falls in the Timpoong–Hibok-Hibok Natural Monument

The 2,227.62-hectare (5,504.6-acre) protected area stretches along the central and western interior of the island of Camiguin. It also includes a buffer zone of 182.91 hectares (452.0 acres) surrounding Mount Hibok-Hibok and 1,239.7 hectares (3,063 acres) surrounding Mount Timpoong, and extends into four of the five municipalities on the island: Mambajao, Catarman, Mahinog and Sagay.

At 1,614 metres (5,295 ft) above sea level, Mount Timpoong is the highest peak of Mount Mambajao. Mambajao is the central and largest of the island's three volcanic mountains (the others being Mount Catarman and Mount Sagay, also known as Mount Guinsiliban). Mount Mambajao's other peaks are Mambajao Peak at 1,568 metres (5,144 ft) above sea level, and an unnamed peak with an elevation of 1,529 metres (5,016 ft). It has flank vents located on Campana Hill and Minokol Hill.

Located just northwest of Mambajao is Mount Catarman. Its highest peak is Mount Hibok-Hibok which measures 1,250 metres (4,100 ft) in elevation and is classified as an active stratovolcano. Mount Tres Marias and Mount Vulcan Daan (Old Volcano) are Mount Catarman's other peaks.

The protected area is also noted for its hydrological features, many of which are popular among tourists and hikers. They include waterfalls such as the Katibawasan, Binangawan and Tuasan Falls, cold and hot springs like those of Ardent and Santo Niño, and rivers such as Sagay and Binangawan rivers. It is also the location of the Hibok-Hibok Volcano Observatory of the Philippine Institute of Volcanology and Seismology.

== Flora and fauna ==
Timpoong and Hibok-Hibok comprises about 300 hectares (740 acres) of mossy forests at elevations above 1,100 metres (3,600 ft), 1,282 hectares (3,170 acres) of residual lowland dipterocarp forests at elevations above 500 metres (1,600 ft), and brush lands and open grasslands covering the remaining 1,585 hectares (3,920 acres). The natural monument was established for the conservation of endangered and endemic fauna that live within those forests. They include one bird species and two mammals that can only be found in Camiguin: the Camiguin hanging parrot, and the Camiguin forest mouse and Camiguin forest rat. Other fauna include the Camiguin hawk-owl, writhed hornbill, Mindanao shrew, Camiguin narrow-mouthed frog, big-eyed frog and small rufous horseshoe bat.

Its vegetation consists of tropical plants endemic to Camiguin such as Miguelia reticulata, Medinilla multiflora, Memecylon subcaudatum, Syzygium camiguense, Coelogyne confusa and Goodyera ramosii.
