= Camiguin forest mouse =

Conservation status
- Vulnerable (IUCN 3.1)

Scientific classification
- Kingdom: Animalia
- Phylum: Chordata
- Class: Mammalia
- Order: Rodentia
- Family: Muridae
- Genus: Apomys
- Species: A. camiguinensis

Binomial name
- Apomys camiguinensis Heaney & Tabaranza, 2006
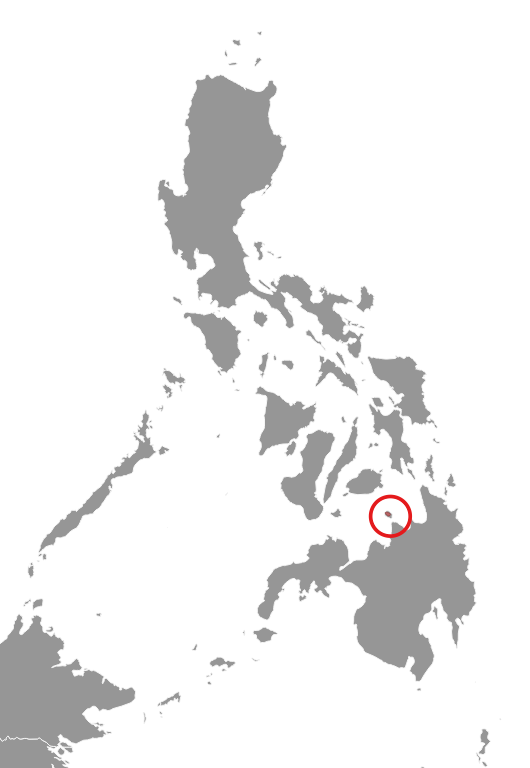

Species of rodent

The Camiguin forest mouse (Apomys camiguinensis) is a forest mouse endemic to the island of Camiguin in the southern Philippines. It has large ears and eyes, a long tail and rusty-brown fur, and it feeds mostly on insects and seeds. This description is based on mice captured during a biological survey conducted in 1994 and 1995 high on the steep slopes of one of the island's volcanoes.

In April, 2006, the new mammal, a Philippine forest mouse, now identified as Apomys camiguinensis was captured on the steep slopes of a volcano of Camiguin during a biological survey by Heaney and Tabaranza. In 2002, Heaney, Tabaranza, and Eric Rickart (from the Utah Museum of Natural History), described a different species of forest-living rodent, Bullimus gamay, from Mt. Timpoong, the same mountain where the new mouse was collected. A frog (Oreophryne nana) named in 1967 had been thought to be the only vertebrate restricted to the island prior to the surveys by Heaney and Tabaranza. The scientists' research was described in the April 5 issue of Fieldiana: Zoology, a scientific journal about biodiversity research published by The Field Museum. It is endemically distributed to Dinagat (FMNH), Luzon (Benguet [USNM], Camarines Sur [FMNH], and Isabela [FMNH] provinces) and Mindoro (FMNH). It is abundant in primary montane forest (1125 – 1350 m), uncommon in mossy forest (1550 – 1750 m), and absent in disturbed lowland forest (475 – 900 m) on Mt. Isarog, southern Luzon, and also in montane forest at 925 m elevation in Balbalasang, Kalinga Province.
