= Guinsiliban =

Municipality in Camiguin, Philippines

- Municipality
- Municipality of Guinsiliban
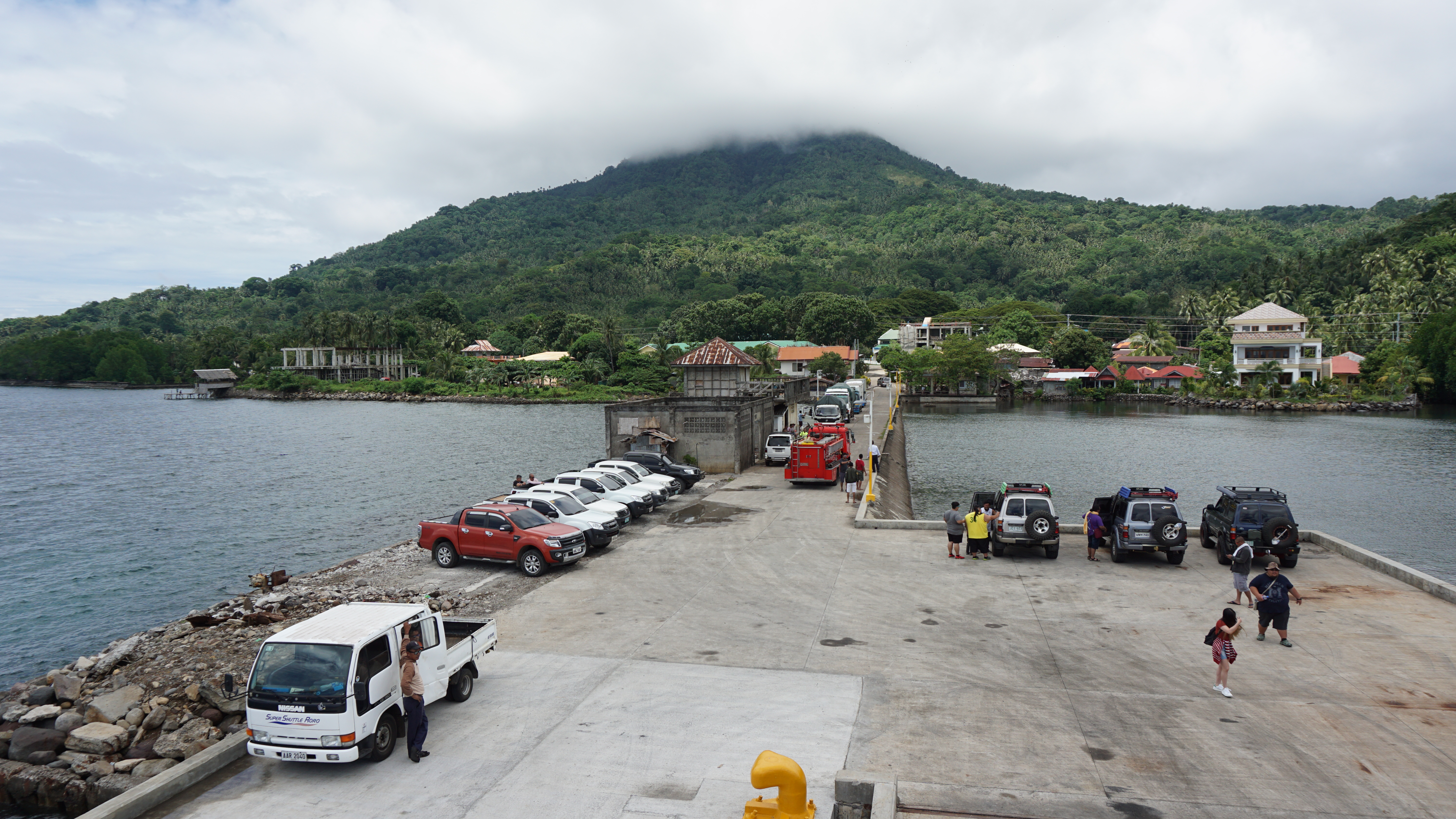
- Guinsiliban Port

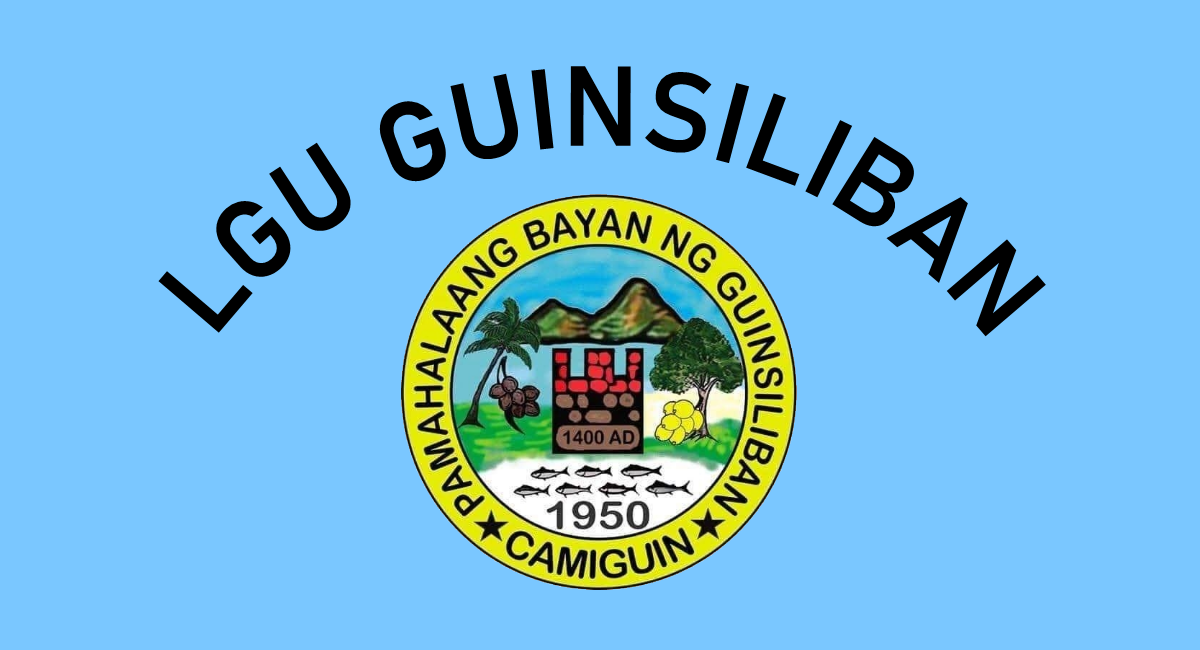
- Flag
- Interactive map of Guinsiliban
- Location within the Philippines
- Coordinates: 9°05′53″N 124°47′10″E
- Country: Philippines
- Region: Northern Mindanao
- Province: Camiguin
- District: Lone district
- Founded: June 13, 1950
- Barangays: 7 (see Barangays)

Government
  - Type: Sangguniang Bayan
  - Mayor: Helenio N. Abecia (PDPLBN)
  - Vice Mayor: Elvis O. Roxas (PDPLBN)
  - Representative: Jurdin Jesus M. Romualdo
  - Municipal Council: Members: Maria Rose B. Albis; Lyndee J. Medalla; Rajah Rex V. Tabalba; Arturo U. Chaves Jr.; Charita R. Ayuban; Veronica Len A. Cadavez; Virgilio F. Lacerna; Manuelito P. Pacudan
  - Electorate: 5,419 voters (2025)

Area
  - Total: 18.52 km^{2} (7.15 sq mi)
- Highest elevation: 676 m (2,218 ft)
- Lowest elevation: 0 m (0 ft)

Population (2024 census)
  - Total: 6,827
  - Density: 368.6/km^{2} (954.7/sq mi)
  - Households: 1,707

Economy
  - Income class: 5th municipal income class
  - Poverty incidence: 25.4% (2023)
  - Revenue: ₱ 73.33 million (2024)
  - Assets: ₱ 163 million (2024)
  - Expenditure: ₱ 62.15 million (2024)
  - Liabilities: ₱ 42.15 million (2024)

Service provider
  - Electricity: Camiguin Electric Cooperative (CAMELCO)
- Time zone: UTC+8 (PST)
- ZIP code: 9102
- PSGC: 1001802000
- IDD : area code: +63 (0)88
- Native languages: Kinamigin; Cebuano; Tagalog
- Website: www.guinsilibancamiguin.gov.ph

Guinsiliban, officially the Municipality of Guinsiliban, is a municipality in the province of Camiguin, Philippines. According to the 2024 census, it has a population of 6,827 people, making it the least populated town in the province.

== Geography ==
=== Barangays ===
Guinsiliban is politically subdivided into 7 barangays. Each barangay consists of puroks while some have sitios.

- Butay
- Cabuan
- Cantaan
- Liong
- Maac
- North Poblacion
- South Poblacion

=== Climate ===
Climate data for Guinsiliban, Camiguin
Month	Jan	Feb	Mar	Apr	May	Jun	Jul	Aug	Sep	Oct	Nov	Dec	Year
Mean daily maximum °C (°F)	28 (82)	28 (82)	29 (84)	30 (86)	30 (86)	29 (84)	29 (84)	30 (86)	30 (86)	29 (84)	29 (84)	28 (82)	29 (84)
Mean daily minimum °C (°F)	23 (73)	23 (73)	23 (73)	23 (73)	24 (75)	25 (77)	25 (77)	25 (77)	25 (77)	25 (77)	24 (75)	24 (75)	24 (75)
Average precipitation mm (inches)	327 (12.9)	254 (10.0)	185 (7.3)	128 (5.0)	215 (8.5)	273 (10.7)	248 (9.8)	243 (9.6)	214 (8.4)	246 (9.7)	271 (10.7)	271 (10.7)	2,875 (113.3)
Average rainy days	24.3	21.1	22.5	20.6	28.3	28.8	29.4	29.0	28.0	28.3	26.0	24.2	310.5
Source: Meteoblue

== Demographics ==
Population census of Guinsiliban
Year	Pop.	±% p.a.
1960	3,499	—
1970	5,686	+4.97%
1975	4,057	−6.55%
1980	4,254	+0.95%
1990	4,341	+0.20%
1995	4,919	+2.37%
2000	5,092	+0.74%
2007	5,559	+1.22%
2010	5,580	+0.14%
2015	6,281	+2.28%
2020	6,685	+1.32%
2024	6,827	+0.51%
Source: Philippine Statistics Authority

In the 2024 census, the population of Guinsiliban was 6,827 people, with a density of 370 inhabitants per square kilometre or 960 inhabitants per square mile.

== Economy ==
Poverty incidence of Guinsiliban (%)

Source: Philippine Statistics Authority
