= Mantigue =

Island in the Philippines

Mantigue Island
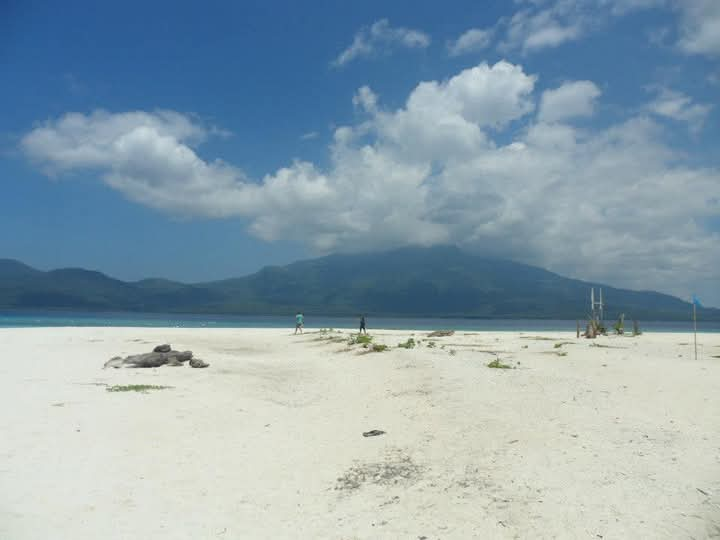
- White Beach in Mantigue Island, Mahinog, Camiguin

- Location within Philippines

Geography
- Coordinates: 9°10′18″N 124°49′31″E
- Adjacent to: Bohol Sea

Administration
- Philippines
- Region: Northern Mindanao
- Province: Camiguin
- Municipality: Mahinog

Mantigue is a small island located about 3.5 kilometres (2.2 mi) off the coast of volcanic island province of Camiguin province in the Philippines. Also known as Magsaysay Island, it is about 4 hectares (9.9 acres) of greenery fringed with a gleaming white beach of powdery coral sand. It used to be home to a fishing village until the government prohibited any locals from residing therein and declared the island a protected area and sanctuary for sea turtles.

One side of the island is a white sand beach with corals offshore, and the opposite side provides a deep drop-off for snorkeling and diving. Both are open to the public during daytime only, where people can stay in cottages or swim in the sea.

Mantigue Island can be reached by light water craft in 25–30 minutes from Barangays Benoni, San Roque or Binaliwan, all in the town of Mahinog. The provincial government of Camiguin mandates the local government of Mahinog as the official caretaker of the island.

== See also ==
- List of islands of the Philippines
