= Camiguin =

- Province
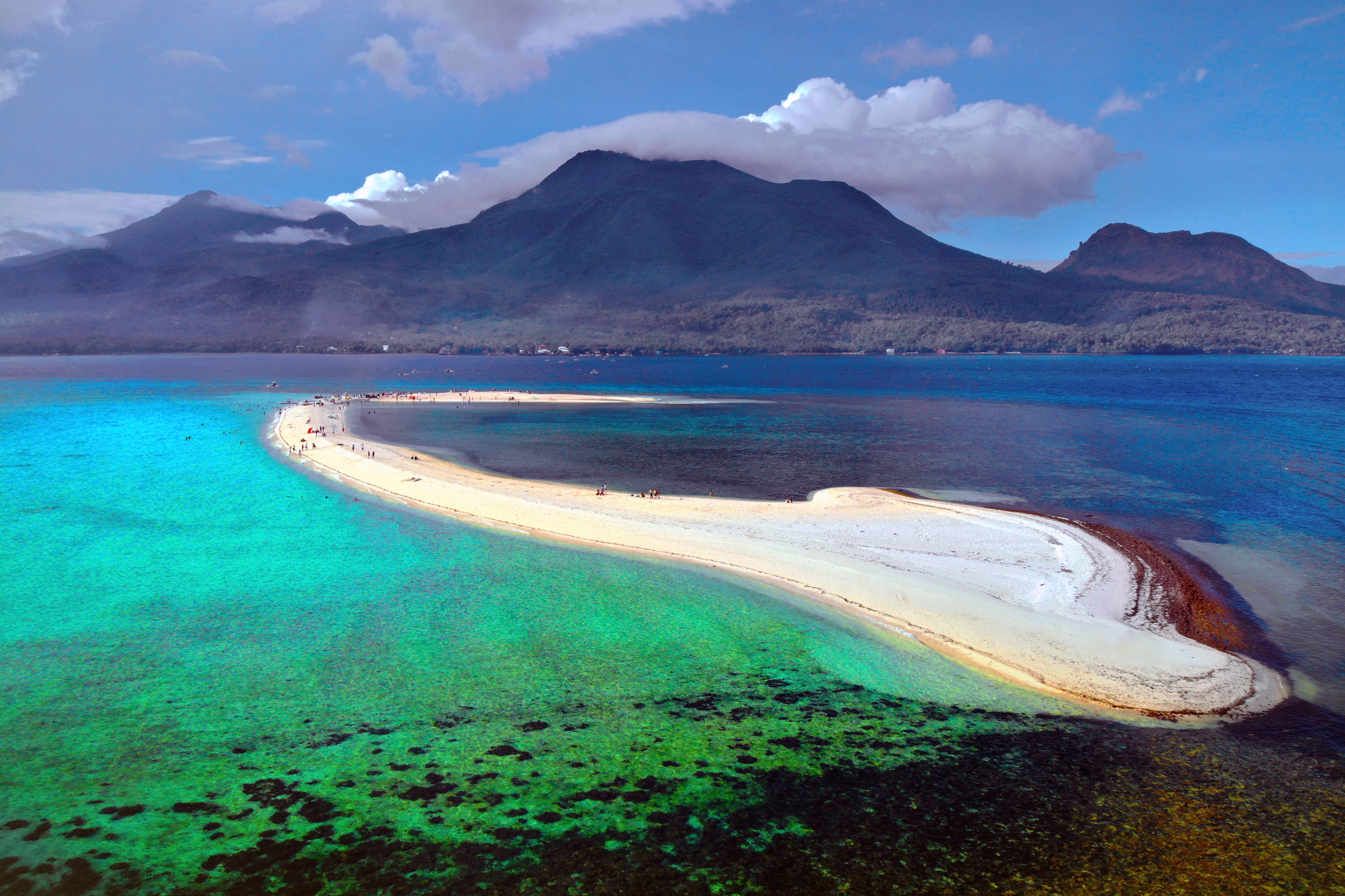
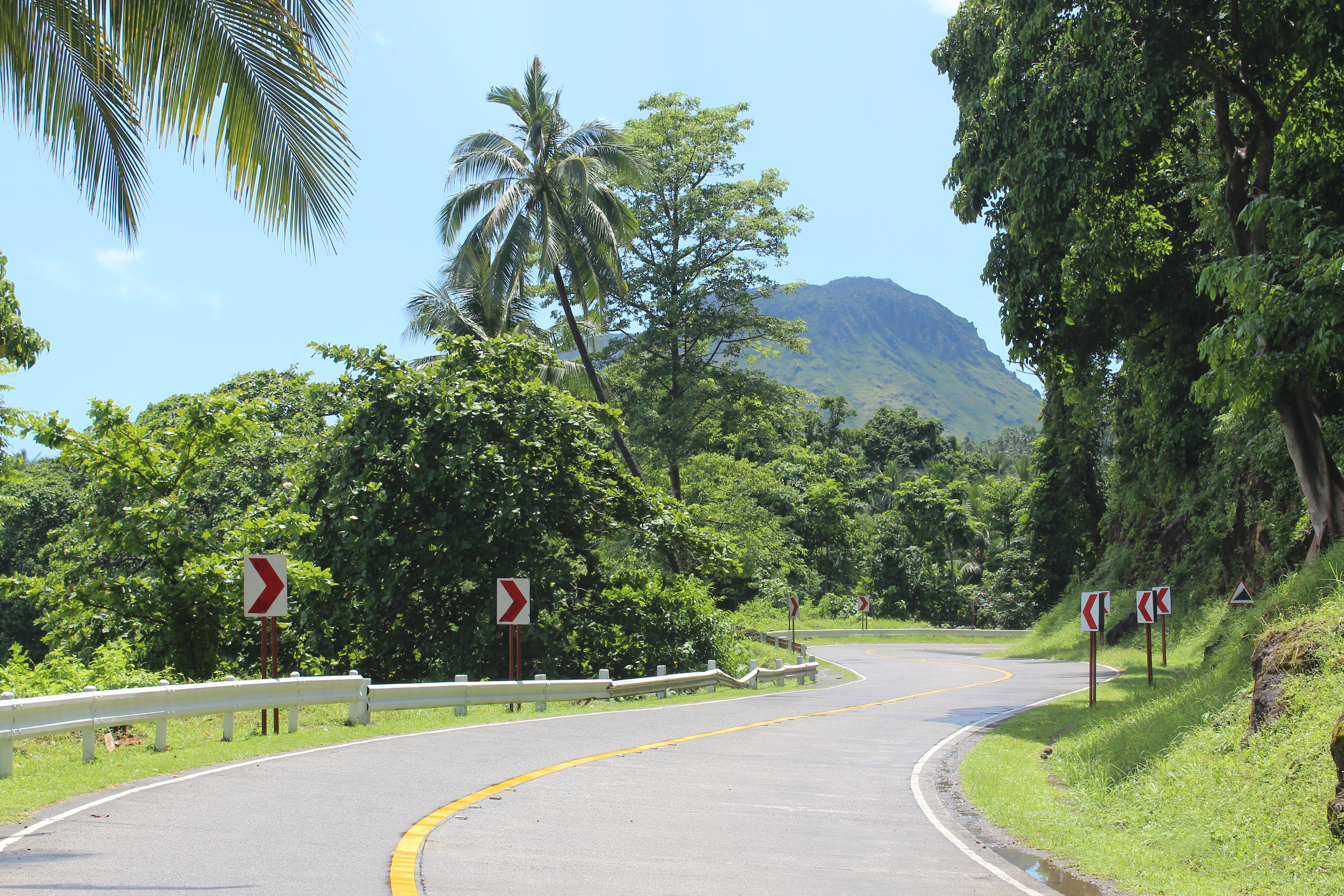
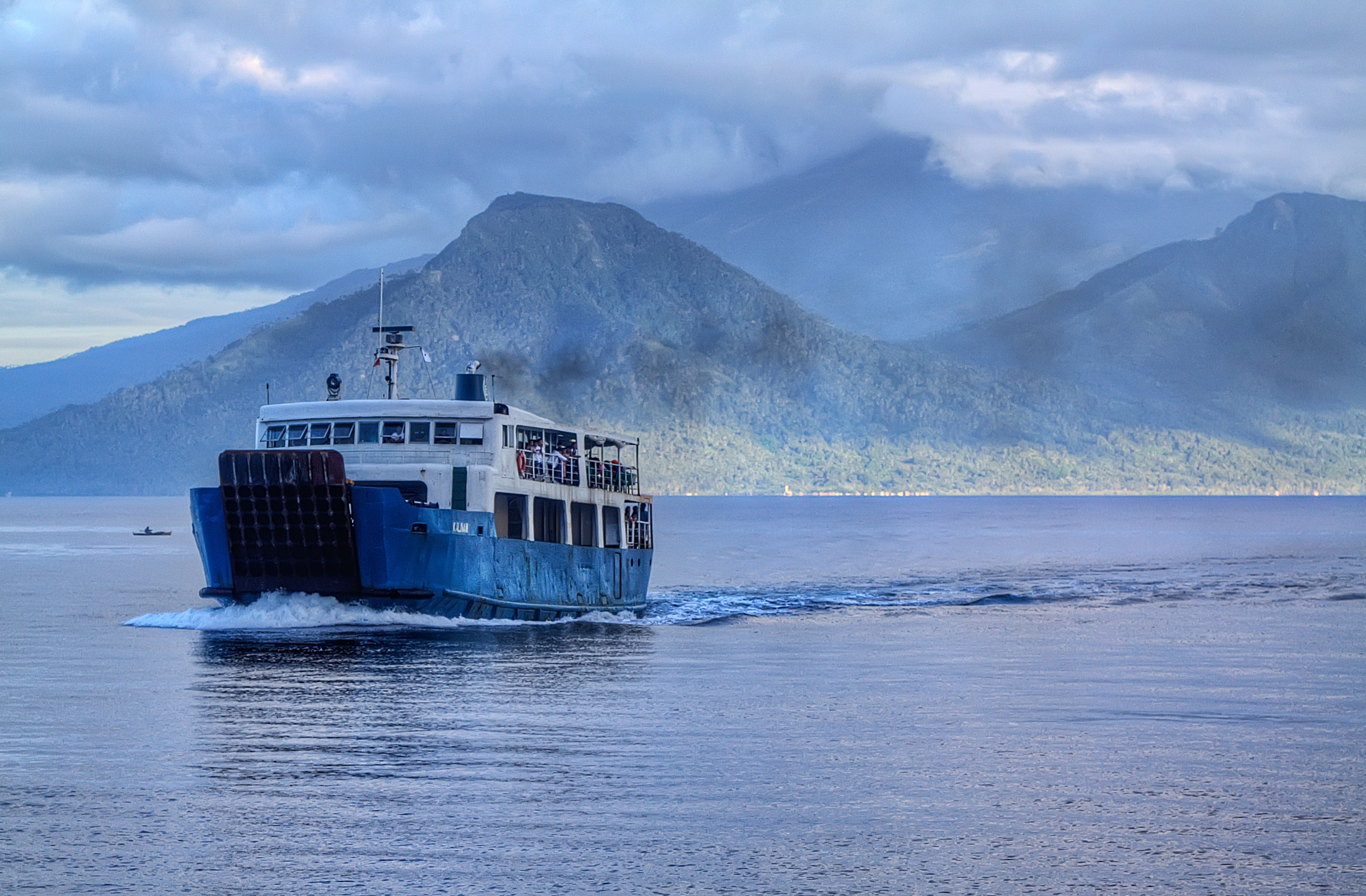
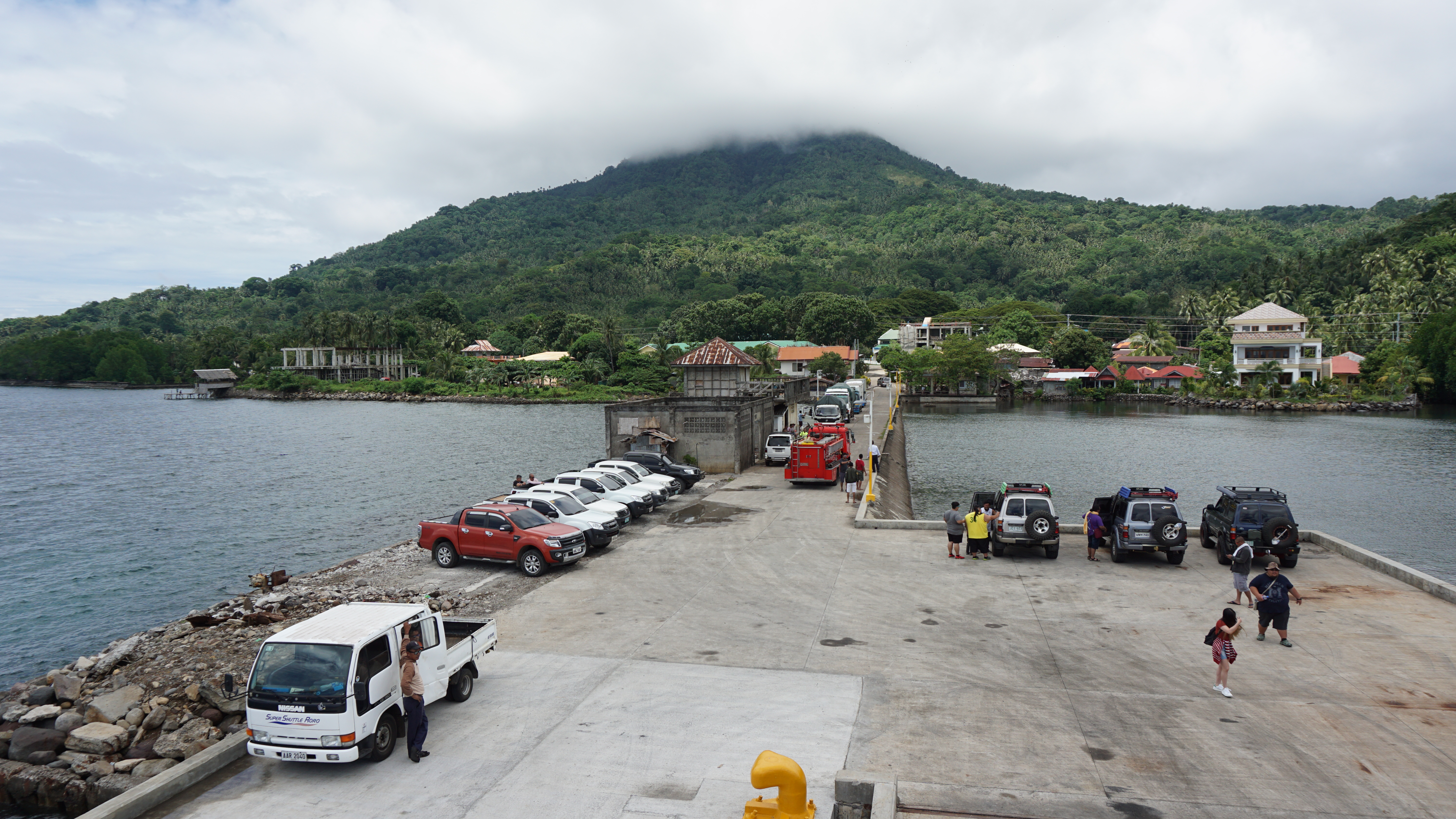
- (clockwise from top) Timpoong and Hibok-Hibok Natural Monument, Ferry in Camiguin, Guinsiliban Port, and Camiguin Circumferential Road

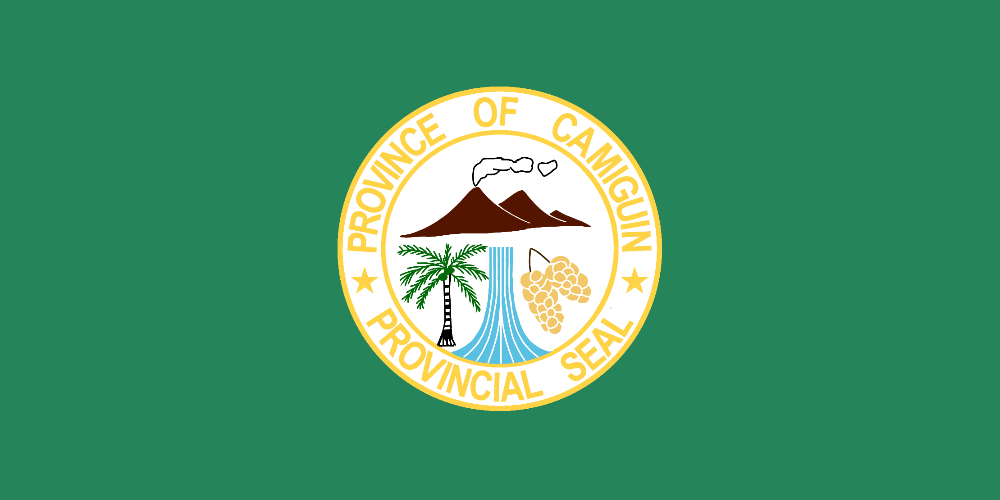
- Flag Seal
- Nickname: The Island Born of Fire
- Location in the Philippines
- Interactive map of Camiguin
- Coordinates: 9°10′N 124°43′E
- Country: Philippines
- Region: Northern Mindanao
- Founded: 1565
- Chartered: June 18, 1966
- Capital and largest municipality: Mambajao

Government
  - Governor: Xavier Jesus M. Romualdo (Lakas)
  - Vice Governor: Rodin M. Romualdo (PFP)
  - Representative: Jurdin Jesus Romualdo
  - Legislature: Camiguin Provincial Board
  - Electorate: 66,557 voters (2025)

Area
  - Total: 241.44 km^{2} (93.22 sq mi)
  - Rank: 80th out of 82
- Highest elevation (Mount Timpoong): 1,630 m (5,350 ft)

Population (2024 census)
  - Total: 94,892
  - Rank: 80th out of 82
  - Density: 393.03/km^{2} (1,017.9/sq mi)
  - Rank: 17th out of 82
  - Households: 22,281
- Demonym: Kamiginhon

Divisions
  - Independent cities: 0
  - Component cities: 0
  - Municipalities: 5: Catarman; Guinsiliban; Mahinog; Mambajao; Sagay
  - Barangays: 58
  - Districts: Legislative districts of Camiguin

Economy
  - Income class: 3rd provincial income class
  - Poverty incidence: 9.4% (2023)
  - Revenue: ₱ 850.6 million (2024)
  - Assets: ₱ 4,205 million (2024)
  - Expenditure: ₱ 727 million (2024)
  - Liabilities: ₱ 1,056 million (2024)
- Time zone: UTC+8 (PST)
- PSGC: 101800000
- IDD : area code: +63 (0)88
- ISO 3166 code: PH-CAM
- Spoken languages: Cebuano; Kinamigin; Tagalog; English
- Website: www.camiguin.gov.ph

Camiguin, officially the Province of Camiguin (Cebuano: Lalawigan sa Camiguin; Tagalog: Lalawigan ng Camiguin; Kamigin: Probinsya ta Kamigin), is an island province in the Philippines located in the Bohol Sea, about 10 kilometers (6.2 mi) off the northern coast of mainland Mindanao. It is geographically part of Region X, the Northern Mindanao Region of the country and formerly a part of Misamis Oriental province.

Camiguin is the second-smallest province in the country in both population and land area after Batanes. The provincial capital is Mambajao, which is also the province's largest municipality in both area and population.

The province is famous for its sweet lanzones, to which its annual Lanzones Festival is dedicated and celebrated every third weekend of October. It is home to lush interior forest reserves, collectively known as the Mount Hibok-Hibok Protected Landscape, which has been declared by all Southeast Asian nations as an ASEAN Heritage Park. The province also boasts three National Cultural Treasures, namely, the Old Bonbon Church ruins in Catarman, the Sunken Cemetery of Catarman, and the Spanish-era watchtower in Guinsiliban. The three sites were declared for “possessing outstanding historical, cultural, artistic and/or scientific value which is highly significant and important to the country and nation.”

Additionally, the island province has numerous Important Cultural Treasures, such as the Old Mambajao Fountain - situated in the town's rotonda, the Old Mambajao Municipal Building, the façade of the Santo Rosario Church in Sagay, and 14 heritage and ancestral houses. The sites were declared for “having exceptional cultural, artistic and historical significance to the Philippines.” All cultural treasures were declared by the National Commission for Culture and the Arts. There have been moves to establish a dossier nomination for the province to be included in the UNESCO World Heritage List.

Camiguin is sometimes called Camiguin Sur ("South Camiguin") or Camiguin de Mindanao to distinguish it from Camiguin de Babuyanes of the Babuyan Islands, which in turn is referred to as Camiguin Norte ("North Camiguin"). Both are volcanic islands.

== Etymology ==
The name Camiguin is derived from the native word Kamagong, a species of ebony tree that thrives near Lake Mainit in the province of Surigao del Norte, in the mainland Mindanao, where the earlier inhabitants of the islands, the Manobos, originated. Kamigin, the local dialect of Camiguin, is the northernmost variant of the Manobo languages.

An earlier Spanish geography book spells the island as Camiguing. There is reason to suppose the Spaniards dropped the final g, given how the phoneme /ŋ/ does not exist in Spanish. Today it is rendered as Camiguín.

== History ==
=== Early history ===
The island of Camiguin is believed to have been first inhabited by the Manobo people of Surigao del Norte, as evidenced by the distinctly connected language between the two groups. The island was used as a trading stop point by various merchants and traders from the Rajahnate of Butuan, the Kedatuan of Dapitan, the ancient people of the Anda peninsula, and possibly the Rajahnate of Cebu and the animist Maranao of Lanao before the Islamization of the Lanao provinces.

=== Spanish colonial era ===
Old Spanish documents indicate that the explorers Ferdinand Magellan and Miguel Lopez de Legaspi landed in Camiguin in 1521 and 1565, respectively. The first Spanish settlement was established in 1598 in what is now Guinsiliban. Guinsiliban, which comes from the old Kinamiguin word Ginsil-ipan (which means “to look out for pirates from a watchtower”) has an old Spanish watchtower where the Camiguinons kept watch for Moro pirates.

The first major Spanish settlement, established in 1679, was called Katagman or Katadman (known as Catarman). The settlement grew and prospered but was destroyed by the eruption of Mt. Vulcan in 1871. The former location is what is now Barangay Bonbon of Catarman. The Spanish era census of 1818, recorded 1,653 native families in Camiguin and 35 Spanish-Filipino families.

Sagay, located south of Catarman, was formally established as a town in 1848. The word Sagay is derived from the name of poisonous fruit trees that grow in the area. Mambajao became a town in 1855. The name was coined from the Visayan terms mamahaw, meaning to usher breakfast, and bajao, which is leftover boiled rice. In the early 1900s, Mambajao prospered and became the busiest port in Northern Mindanao. Mahinog was established as a municipality in 1860. The name Mahinog comes from a Visayan word meaning "to ripen" or "to become ripe". Although Guinsiliban was the oldest settlement in the island, it was only in 1950 that it became a municipality. Mahinog was formerly governed by Mambajao while Guinsiliban was formally governed from Sagay.

=== American invasion era ===
In 1901, in the middle of the Philippine–American War, American soldiers landed in Camiguin to assume political control over the island. A group of Camiguinons, armed with bolos and spears, led by Valero Camaro, fought them in a short battle in Catarman. Valero Camaro was killed by a bullet in the forehead. Further study is needed before he and his band can be recognized as patriots in the same way the Katipuneros are recognized. There is no study that identifies an independence movement in Camiguin during the American occupation. However, a small detail with regards to the colonial resistance in Cagayan, Misamis indicates that Camiguinons supported in a clandestine way the revolutionary activities of the Cagayanons against the new colonizers. They offered their arms and ammunitions and a typewriter to the revolucionarios in Cagayan. In the same year, Camiguin became part of the newly established province of Misamis by virtue of Act No. 128.

In 1903, the first public school in Camiguin was built in Mambajao but what is known today as the Mambajao Central School was completed in 1912. On September 9, 1904, the first public water system, known as Las Aguas Potables de Mambajao, spearheaded by an admired civic leader by the name of Placido Reyes and co-operated by townspeople, was inaugurated.

In 1929, Camiguin Island became part of Oriental Misamis when Misamis was divided into two provinces by virtue of Act No. 3537. The change took effect on January 1, 1930.

=== Japanese occupation ===
On June 18, 1942, the Japanese Imperial Army landed in Camiguin and set up a government in Mambajao. They gutted central Mambajao in reprisal to guerrilla activities in the area. The remains of some of these buildings still exist today.

=== Postwar era ===
On July 4, 1946, the Philippines gained independence from the United States. On June 22, 1957, Camiguin formally became a subprovince of Misamis Oriental through Republic Act No. 2021 signed by President Carlos P. Garcia.

Finally, on June 18, 1966, Camiguin was made into a separate province through Republic Act No. 4669 which was formally signed in 1968.

=== Martial law era ===
The beginning months of the 1970s had marked a period of turmoil and change in the Philippines, with many implications for Camiguin. During his bid to be the first Philippine president to be re-elected for a second term, Ferdinand Marcos launched an unprecedented number of foreign debt-funded public works projects. This caused the Philippine economy took a sudden downwards turn known as the 1969 Philippine balance of payments crisis, which in turn led to a period of economic difficulty and a significant rise of social unrest.

In 1972, one year before the expected end of his last constitutionally allowed term as president in 1973, Ferdinand Marcos placed the Philippines under Martial Law. This allowed Marcos to remain in power for fourteen more years, during which Camiguin went through many social and economic ups and downs. Camiguinon citizens were among those who were victims of the human rights abuses during Martial law under Ferdinand Marcos; some of them were among the Northern Mindanaoans whose grievances were formally recognized and granted the right to reparations in 2014.

=== Recent history ===
In 2004, an area in the core of the island which included the Mambajao and its highest peak Mount Timpoong, as well as Mount Catarman including the active volcano Mount Hibok-Hibok, as a protected area named the Timpoong and Hibok-Hibok Natural Monument. Proclamation 570 s. 2004, which created the monument, also set aside its adjacent areas as "buffer zones" for the protection of the area. During the 13th ASEAN Ministerial Meeting on the Environment in 2015, the Timpoong and Hibok-Hibok monument was formally declared an ASEAN Heritage Park.

== Geography ==
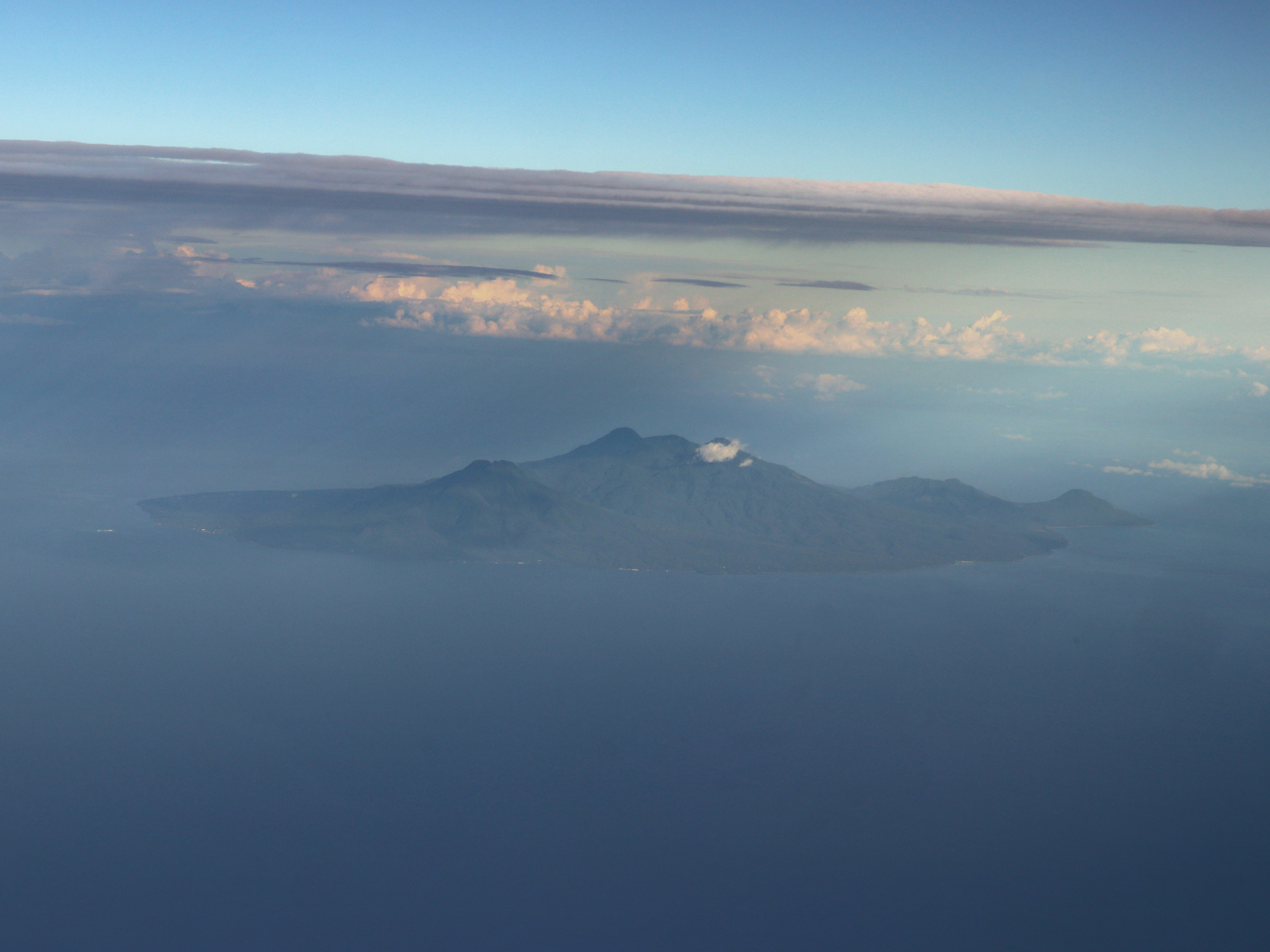
Aerial view of Camiguin in 2023

The province consists primarily of Camiguin Island, as well as a few other surrounding minor islets including:

- White Island, about 5 kilometers (3.1 mi) west of the town of Mambajao
- Mantigue Island, about 14 kilometers (8.7 mi) south of Mambajao.

=== Physical ===
Camiguin Island is a pearl-shaped island with an area of approximately 238 square kilometers (92 sq mi). The island measures about 23 kilometers (14 mi) at its longest and 14.5 kilometers (9.0 mi) at its widest breadth. The island is mountainous with the highest elevation reaching over 5,000 ft (1,500 m). It is encircled by a national road with a length of about 64 kilometers (40 mi). As of the August 1, 2007, census, the province has a fifth-class income classification with a population of 81,293.

=== Administrative divisions ===
Camiguin comprises five municipalities, which are further subdivided into a total of 58 barangays.

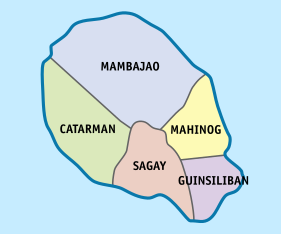
Political divisions

Municipality (Note: The globe icon marks the town center.)		Population			±% p.a.	Area		Density		Barangay
		(2020)		(2015)		km^{2}	sq mi	/km^{2}	/sq mi	
Catarman		18.9%	17,569	16,798	+0.86%	53.75	20.75	330	850	14
Guinsiliban		7.2%	6,685	6,281	+1.19%	18.52	7.15	360	930	7
Mahinog		15.8%	14,634	14,038	+0.79%	32.55	12.57	450	1,200	13
Mambajao	†	44.3%	41,094	38,735	+1.13%	89.00	34.36	460	1,200	15
Sagay		13.8%	12,826	12,626	+0.30%	44.13	17.04	290	750	9
Total			92,808	88,478	+0.91%	241.44	93.22	380	980	58
	† Provincial capital					Municipality				

== Demographics ==
Population census of Camiguin
Year	Pop.	±% p.a.
1903	30,754	—
1918	37,839	+1.39%
1939	40,805	+0.36%
1948	69,599	+6.11%
1960	44,717	−3.62%
1970	53,913	+1.89%
1975	52,547	−0.51%
1980	57,126	+1.68%
1990	64,247	+1.18%
1995	68,039	+1.08%
2000	74,232	+1.89%
2007	81,293	+1.26%
2010	83,807	+1.11%
2015	88,478	+1.04%
2020	92,808	+1.01%
2024	94,892	+0.53%
Source: Philippine Statistics Authority

The population of Camiguin in the 2024 census was 94,892 people, with a density of 400 inhabitants per square kilometre or 1,000 inhabitants per square mile.

The people of Camiguin are called Camiguingnon or Camiguinon (Spanish: Camigueños (m)/Camigueñas (f)). Cebuano is the most spoken language in the province, although Kinamigin is considered to be the indigenous language. Today, Kinamigin is still spoken by a few people in the municipalities of Sagay and Guinsiliban. Other languages spoken varyingly include Boholano dialect of Cebuano, Hiligaynon, Ilocano, Kapampangan and Waray. Tagalog and English are also widely spoken and understood by the local population.

=== Indigenous people ===
An indigenous people group, the Cinamiguin Manobo, are believed to have been the first inhabitants of Camiguin. Their language, known as Kamigin, had 26,700 speakers as of the 2000 census.

=== Religion ===
==== Catholicism ====
Camiguin is a predominantly Roman Catholic province with 95% adherence.

==== Others ====
Other religions are represented by various Protestant and a few Islamic groups.

== Economy ==
Poverty incidence of Camiguin (%)

Source: Philippine Statistics Authority

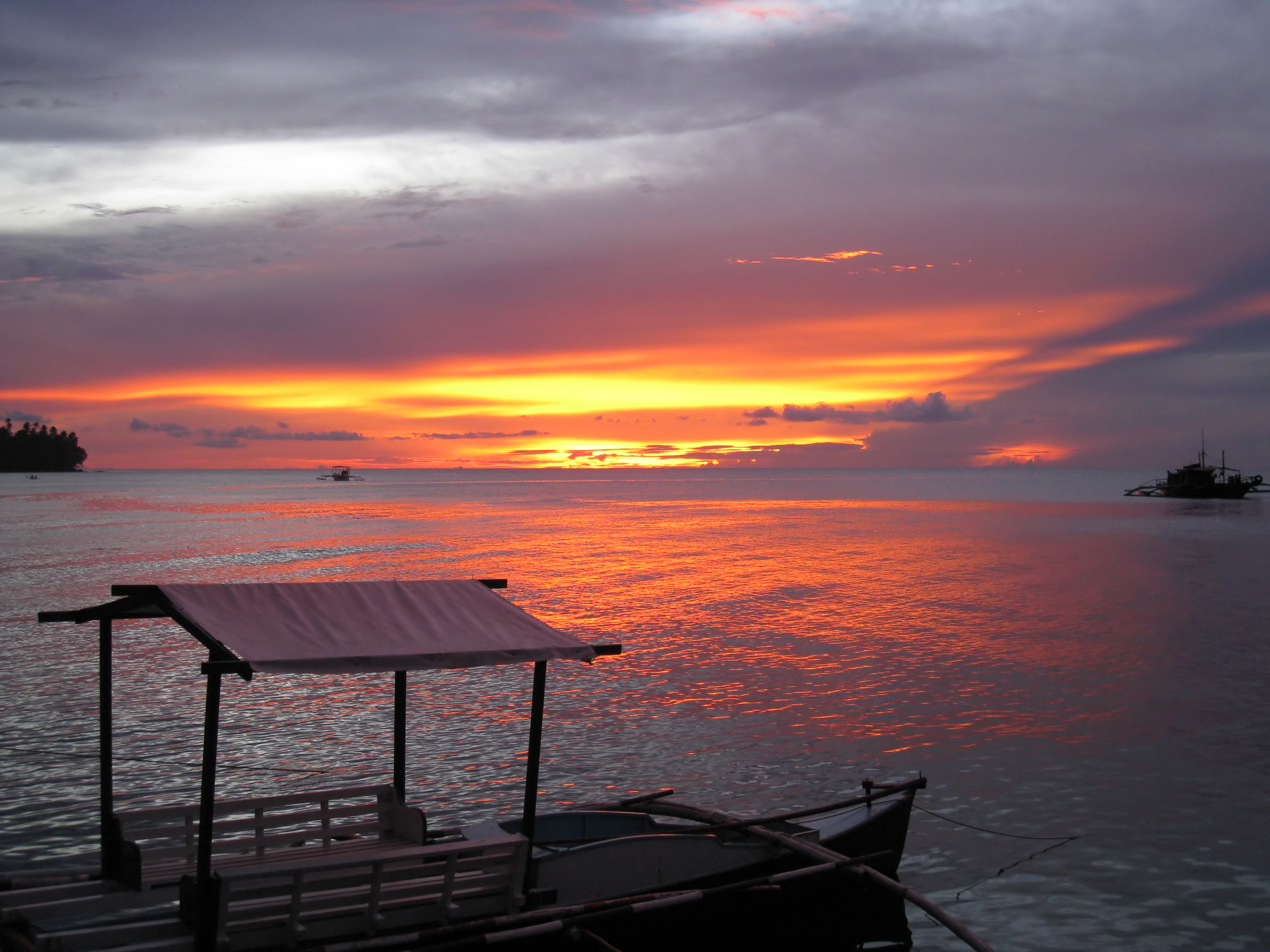
Sunset at Camiguin

The economy is based upon fishing and farming, with copra providing the greatest income contribution. Lanzones has since then become the main agricultural product of the island province. Other agricultural products are abaca, rice, mangoes and other fruit trees. The growing tourism industry has improved the economy of the province. Small cottage industries have increased in number to accommodate the influx of visitors.

== Education ==
Camiguin has three colleges, all located in Mambajao: Fatima College of Camiguin (FCC), Camiguin Polytechnic State College (CPSC), with a satellite campus in Catarman, and Camiguin School of Arts and Trades (CSAT). A complete secondary and elementary education is provided as well, both in private and public schools. There are also day care centers offering nursery and pre-school education.

The province has a total number of 68 day care centers managed by the Department of Social Welfare and Development (DSWD) and 56 public and private elementary schools. There are 13 secondary schools, 3 private institutions and the rest government-owned. There is one special school, which accommodates underprivileged or special children, the Family-to-Family School and Farm, which is managed by a Non-Government Organization (NGO).

The Technical Education and Skills Development Authority (TESDA) also offers vocational courses, as well as the Alternative Learning System Education Sector which helps individuals through its literacy and livelihood program.

== Man-made attractions ==
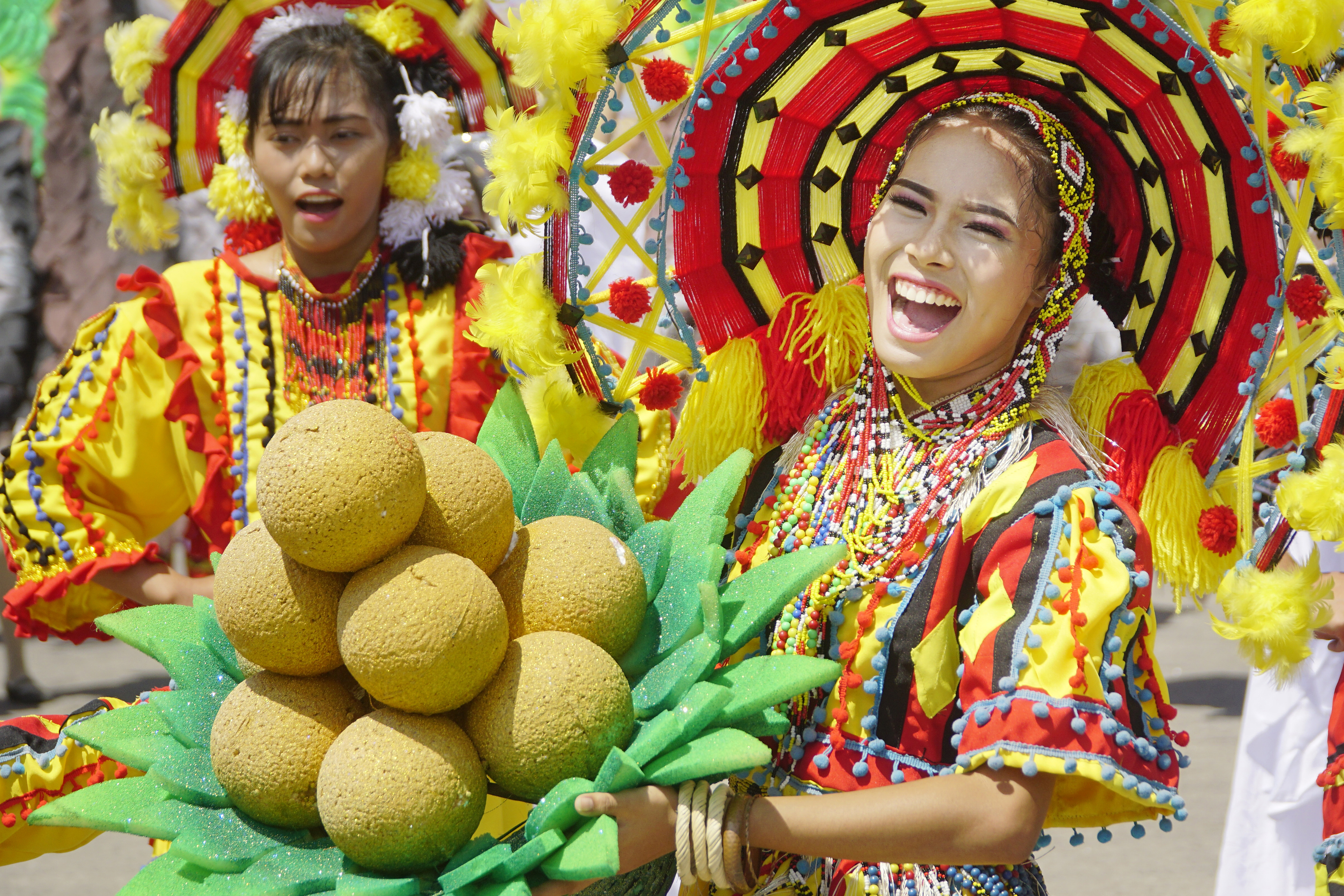
Lanzones Festival, where the lanzones fruit is celebrated by the whole island every third week of October in Mambajao

=== Lanzones Festival ===
Each year in the third week of October, a festival is held to celebrate the Lanzones (locally called bwahan/buahan),a small grape-sized tropical fruit grown all over the island. Lanzones grown in Camiguin is often considered to be one of the sweetest fruits in the Philippines. The unique flavor is due to the richness of the volcanic soil. The week-long Lanzones Festival is one of numerous colorful events in the Philippines that is widely celebrated every year.

=== Churches ===
Several centuries-old Spanish Colonial and 20th century churches are found in various parts of the island.

- Santo Rosario Church: The Santo Rosario Church in the municipality of Sagay was built in 1882. The facade of the church is a declared Important Cultural Property of the Philippines.
- Old Bonbon Church Ruins of Catarman: The church of the Old Bonbon was destroyed and partly submerged by volcanic debris during the eruption and formation of Mount Vulcan from 1871 to 1875. Also known as Gui-ob Church, only the ruins of the church and bell tower remain of the old town. A modern white lighthouse was recently erected close to the bell tower. The archaeological site has been declared as a National Cultural Treasure of the Philippines.
- Baylao Church: The Church located in Barangay Baylao in Mambajao is claimed to be miraculous and the saving of many lives during the last volcanic eruption of Hibok-hibok is attributed to it.
Churches in Camiguin

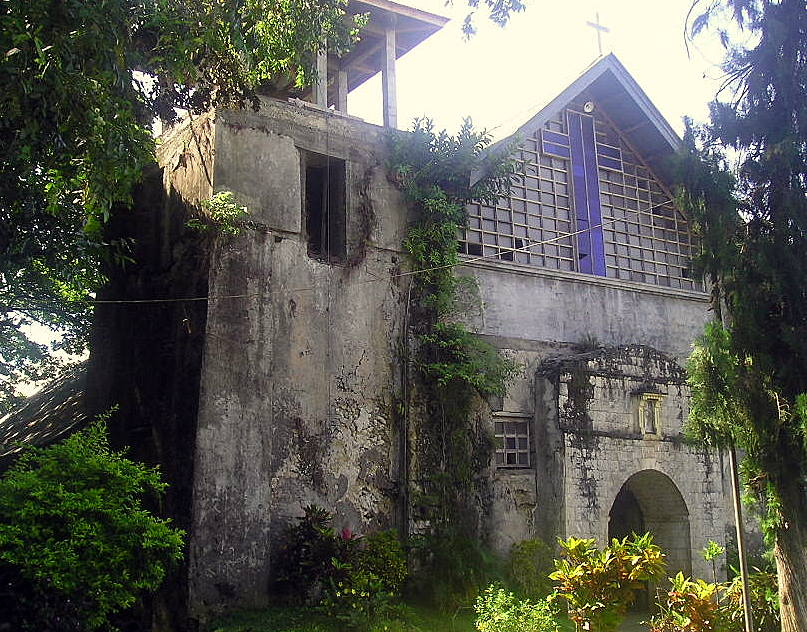
Facade of Santo Rosario Church, in Sagay

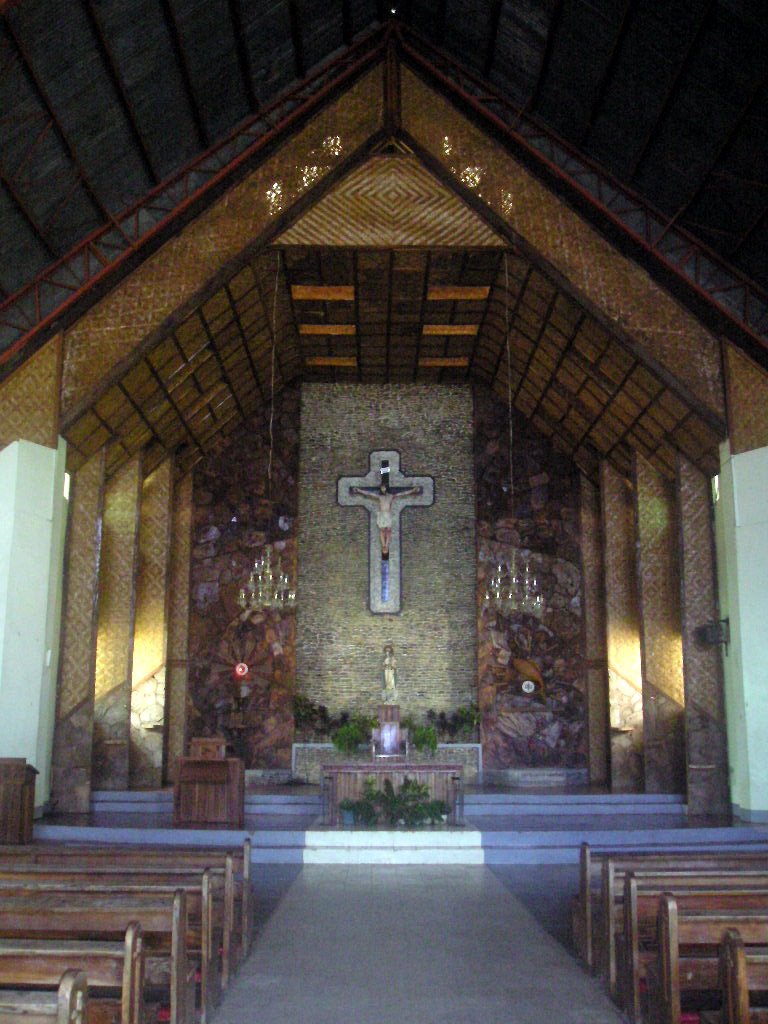
Interior of Santo Rosario Church in the town of Sagay

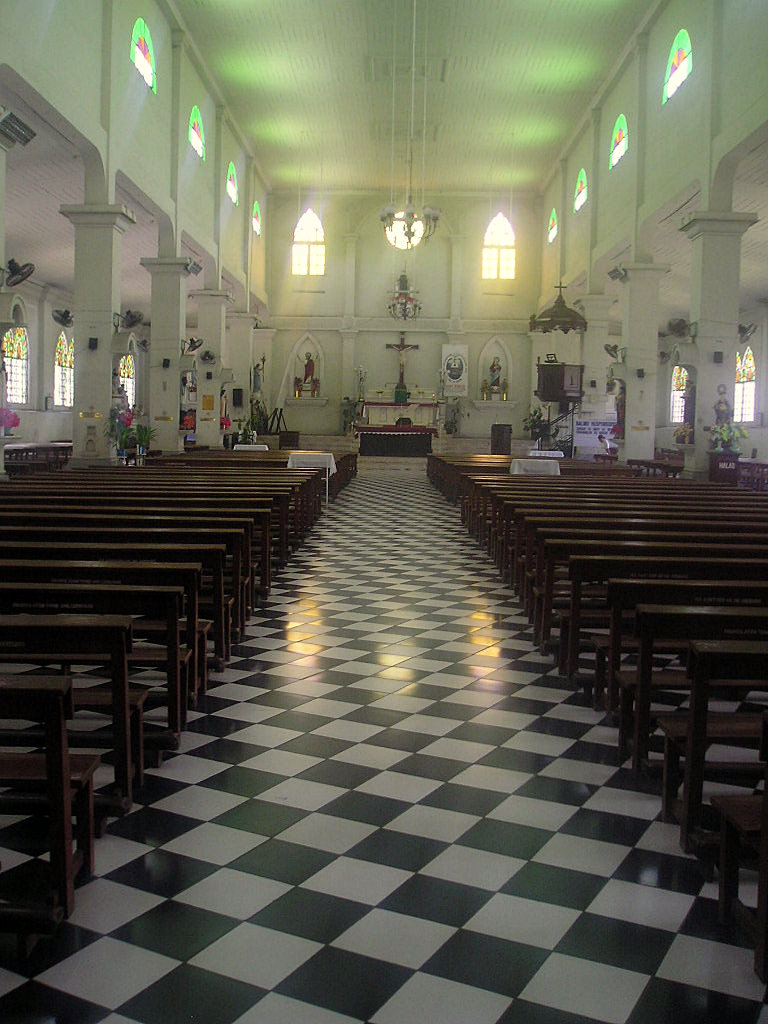
Mambajao church: main altar.

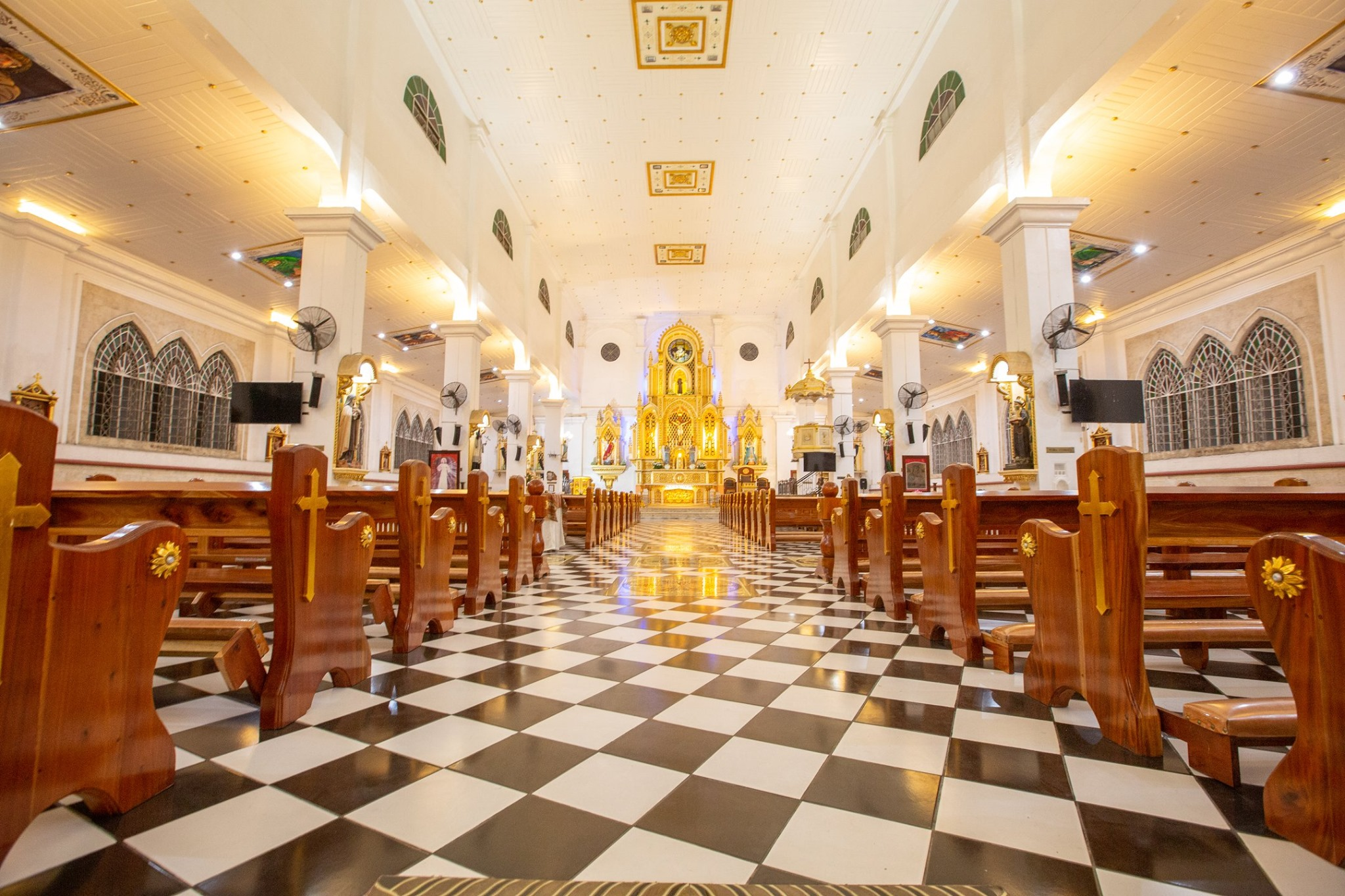

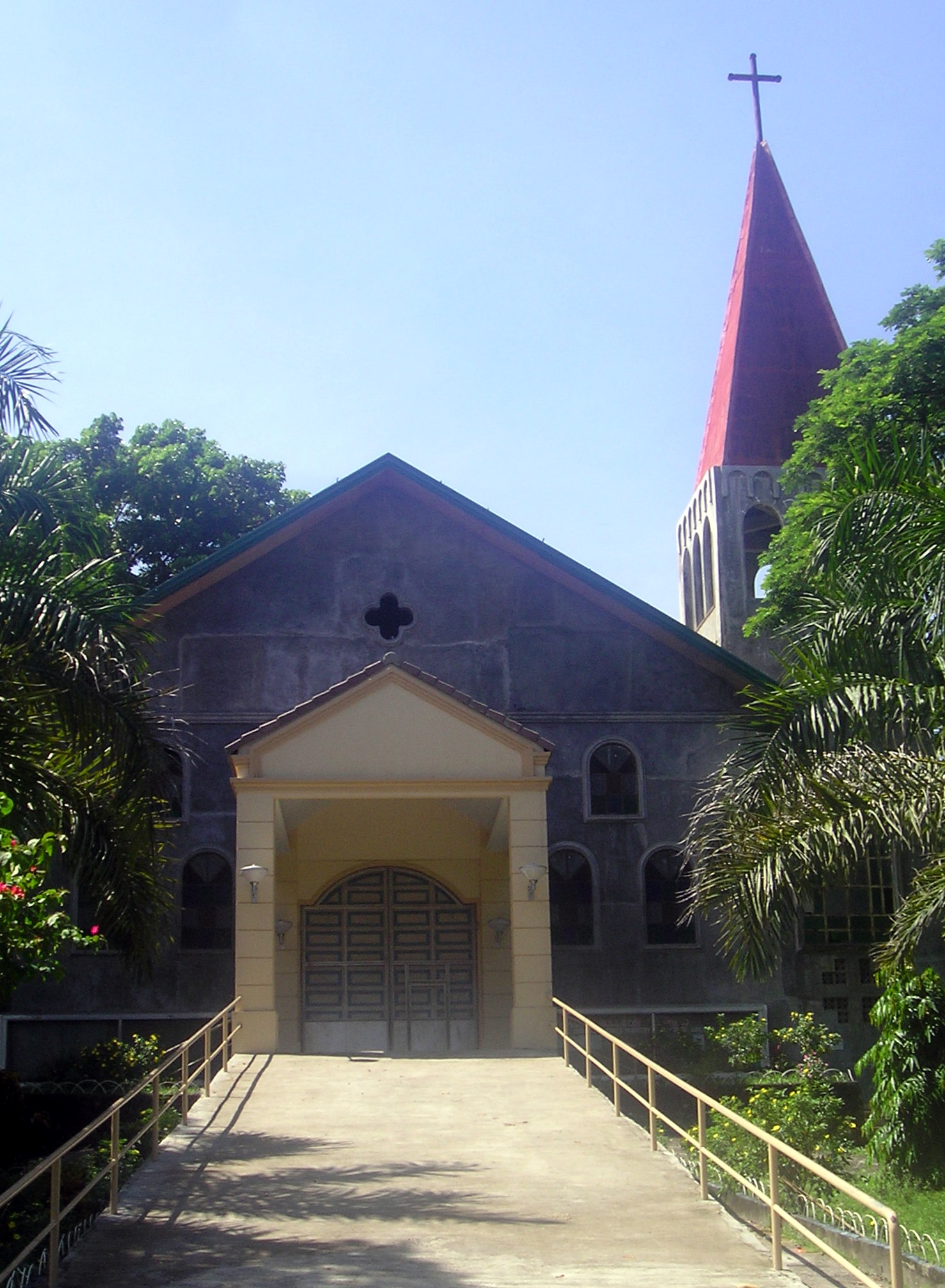
The Catholic Church of Catarman, Camiguin

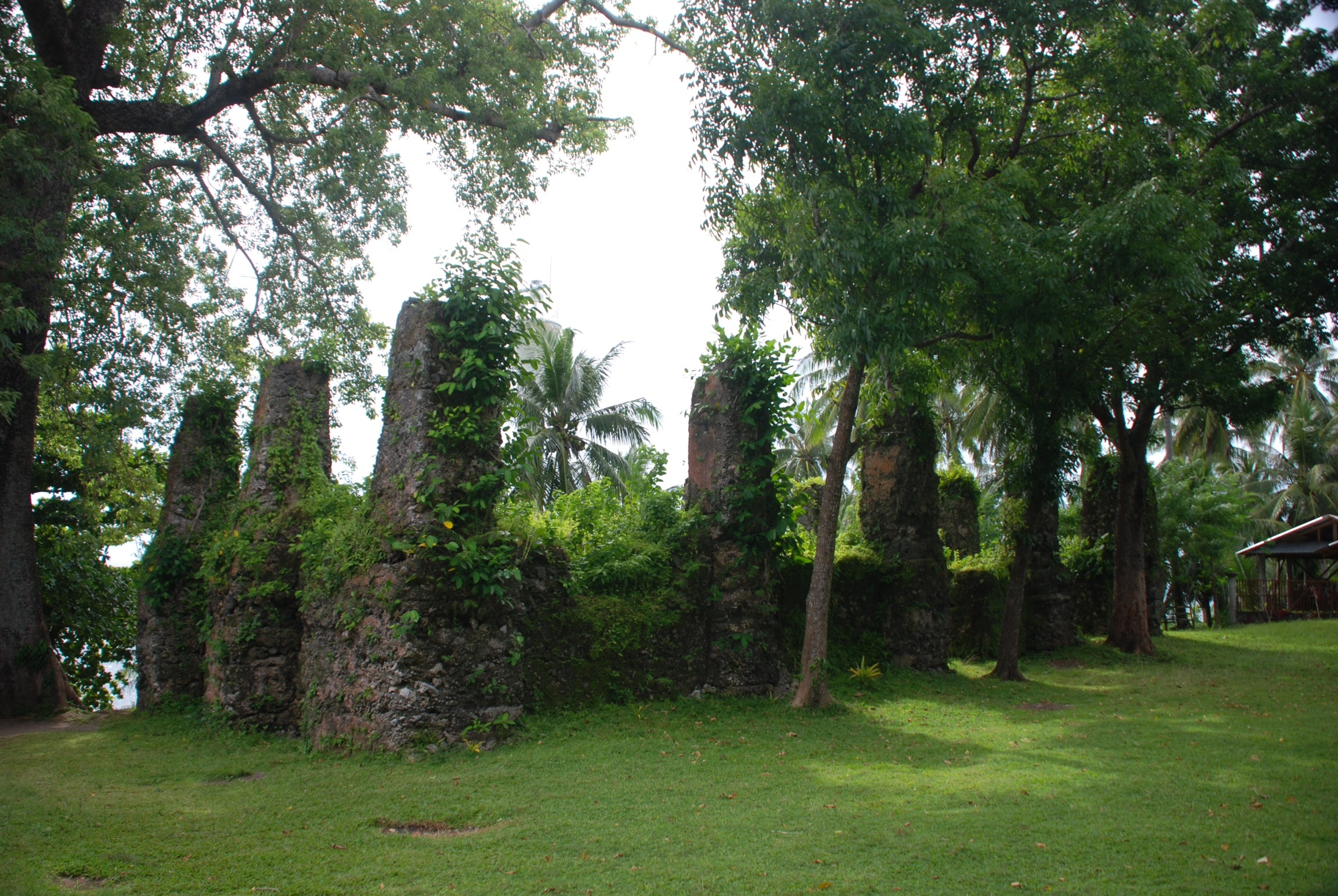
Old Bonbon Church Ruins, Catarman

=== Old ancestral homes ===
Beautiful and ornate ancestral homes dating back to the Spanish Colonial Period and American Colonial Period are still abundant and can be found along the streets of Camiguin. Fourteen of these heritage houses have been declared as Important Cultural Properties of the Philippines. These include the Borromeo ancestral house, Bacut ancestral house, Luspo ancestral house, Neri ancestral house, Nery ancestral house, Nerio-Chan ancestral house, Corrales ancestral house, Corrales y Gamali ancestral house, Francisco ancestral house, Juni ancestral house and Lim ancestral house, and Catalino Chan and Eleuterio Chan ancestral houses.

=== Other structures ===
The province is dotted with numerous heritage structures and zones from the classical, Spanish, and American eras, but most of its heritage sites are from the 300-year Spanish colonial era.

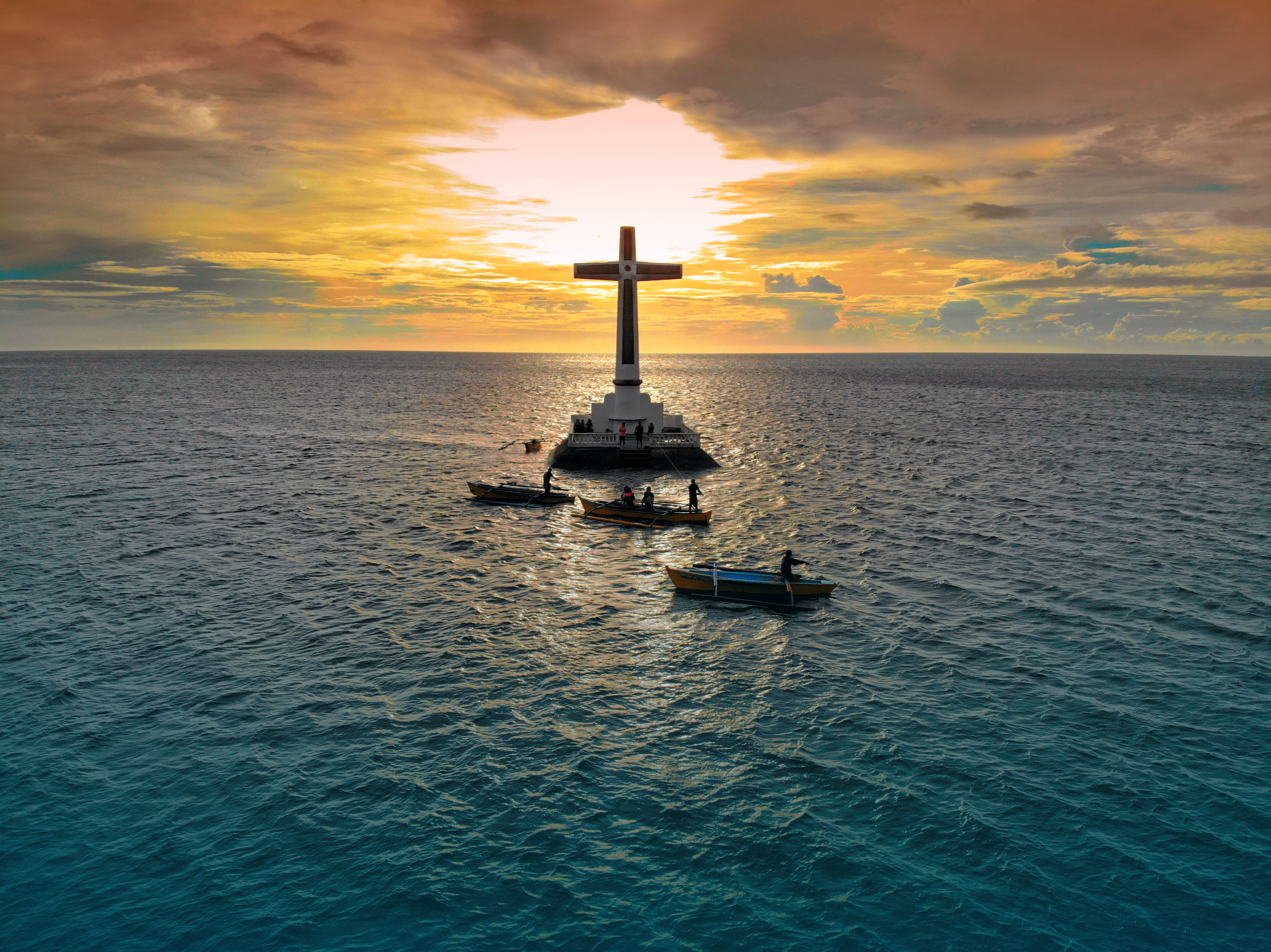
Commemorative Cross later sunk to memorialise the Sunken Cemetery of Catarman.

- Sunken Cemetery of Catarman – an ancient cemetery which sank beneath the sea due to a volcanic eruption. The archaeological site has been declared as a National Cultural Treasure of the Philippines.
- Spanish-era watchtower in Guinsiliban – the watchtower of Guinsiliban was one of the most important in the area during the Spanish colonial era. The watchtower has been declared as a National Cultural Treasure of the Philippines.
- Old Mambajao Fountain – a unique-style fountain from the Spanish era. It has been declared an Important Cultural Property of the Philippines.
- Old Mambajao Municipal building – a well-preserved Spanish-era government building which has been declared an Important Cultural Property of the Philippines.

== Natural attractions ==
=== Volcanoes ===
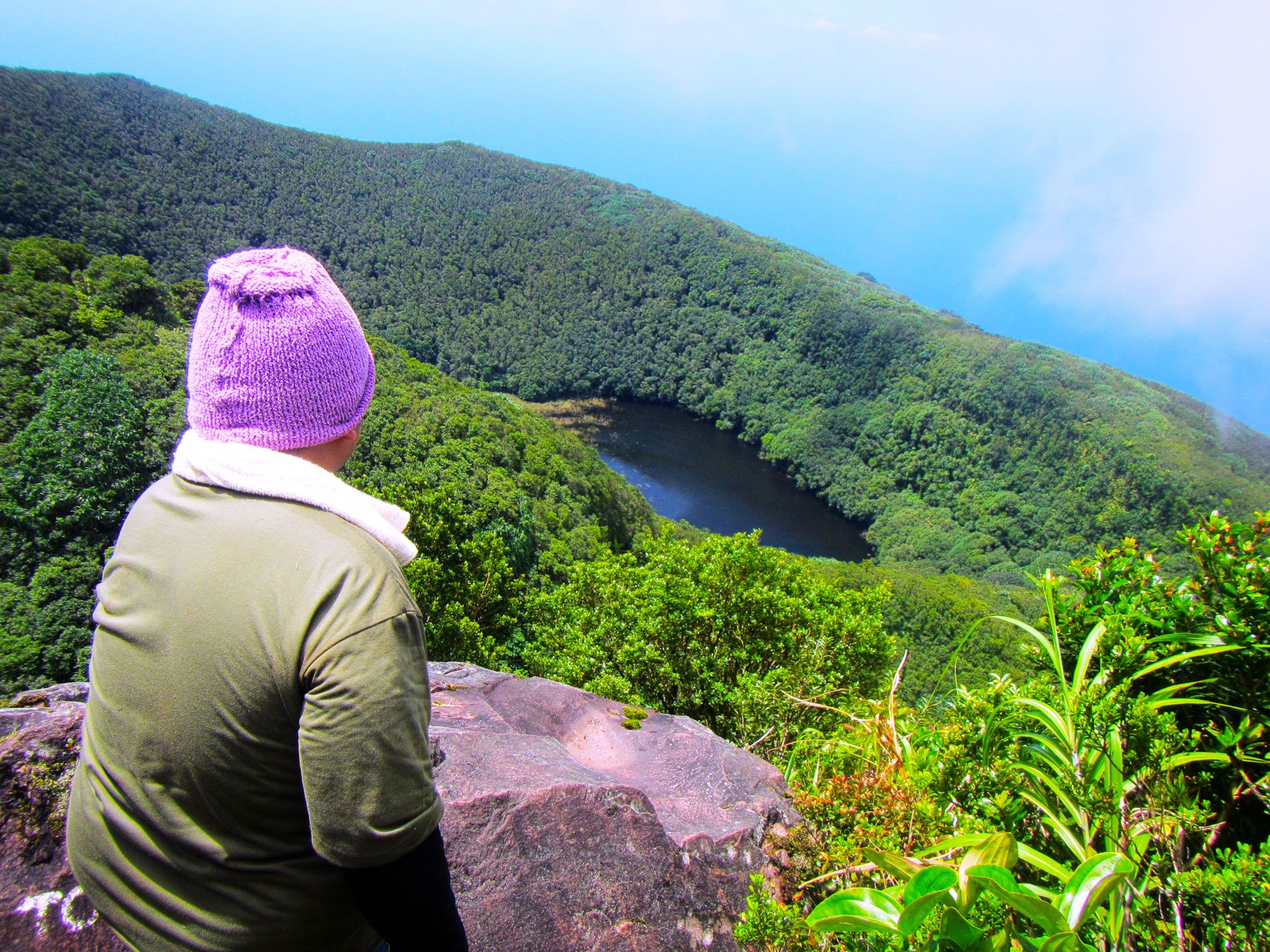
Hibok Hibok volcano crater

The island of Camiguin is of volcanic origin composed of four stratovolcanoes. Each volcano (except Mount Guinsiliban) is made up of several flank domes. The only volcano on the island with historical eruptions is Hibok-Hibok, which last erupted in 1953.

Below is the list of volcanoes, arranged with respect to location from north to south:

- Mount Hibok-Hibok and Mount Vulcan are the northernmost and the only active volcanic vents on Camiguin. Mount Vulcan, ironically known as the Old Volcano [671 m (2,201 ft)], is actually the youngest volcano on the island, starting as a fissure vent in 1871 on the northwestern flank of Mount Hibok-Hibok [4,370 feet (1,330 m)] (see Volcanic eruption below). As a parasitic cone of Hibok-Hibok, it is still considered part of the volcano. Some of the other flank domes of the volcano are Carling Hill, Tres Marias Hills and Piyakong Hill. Ilihan Crater is the site of the 1950 eruption.
- Mount Timpoong is the largest mountain on Camiguin. It is composed of several domes, the tallest of which is Timpoong Peak, also the highest on Camiguin at 5,294 ft (1,614 m). The peak of Mambajao is the second tallest at 5,143 ft (1,568 m). A lower central peak of 5,015 ft (1,529 m) is located between the two peaks. Some of the flank vents on Mount Timpoong are Campana Hill and Minokol Hill.
- Mount Butay, also known as Mount Uhay, is located between the towns of Mahinog and Guinsiliban.
- Mount Guinsiliban is located in the town of Guinsiliban. The 1,872-foot-high (571 m) mountain is the southernmost volcano and the first seen coming from the port of Balingoan on mainland Mindanao.
The Volcanoes of Camiguin

Hibok-hibok Volcano and Mt. Vulcan in the background as seen from White Island

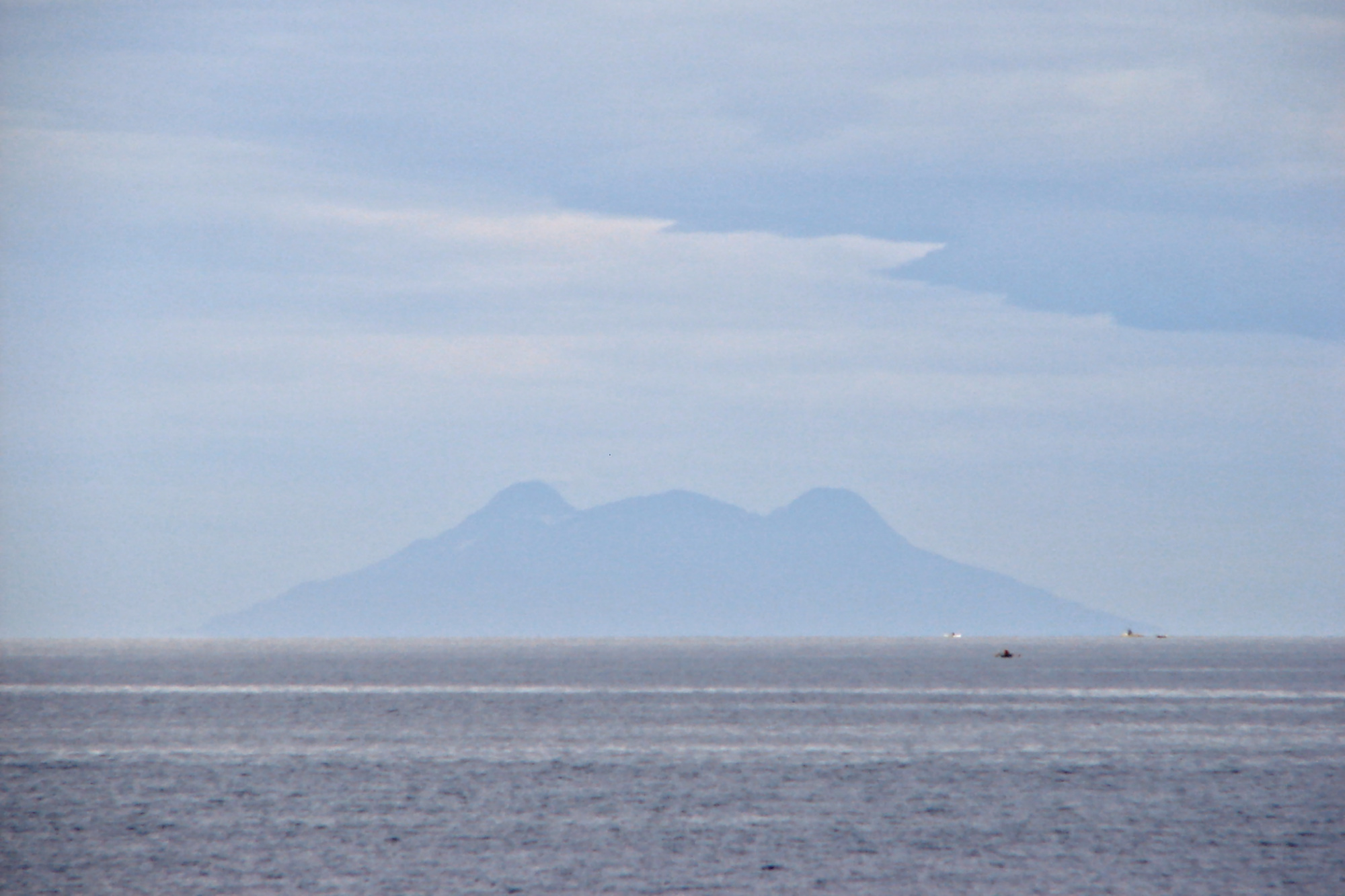
Silhouette of Mt. Timpoong (L) and Mt. Mambajao (R), the highest peaks of the largest mountain in Camiguin, as seen from the north, across Bohol Sea

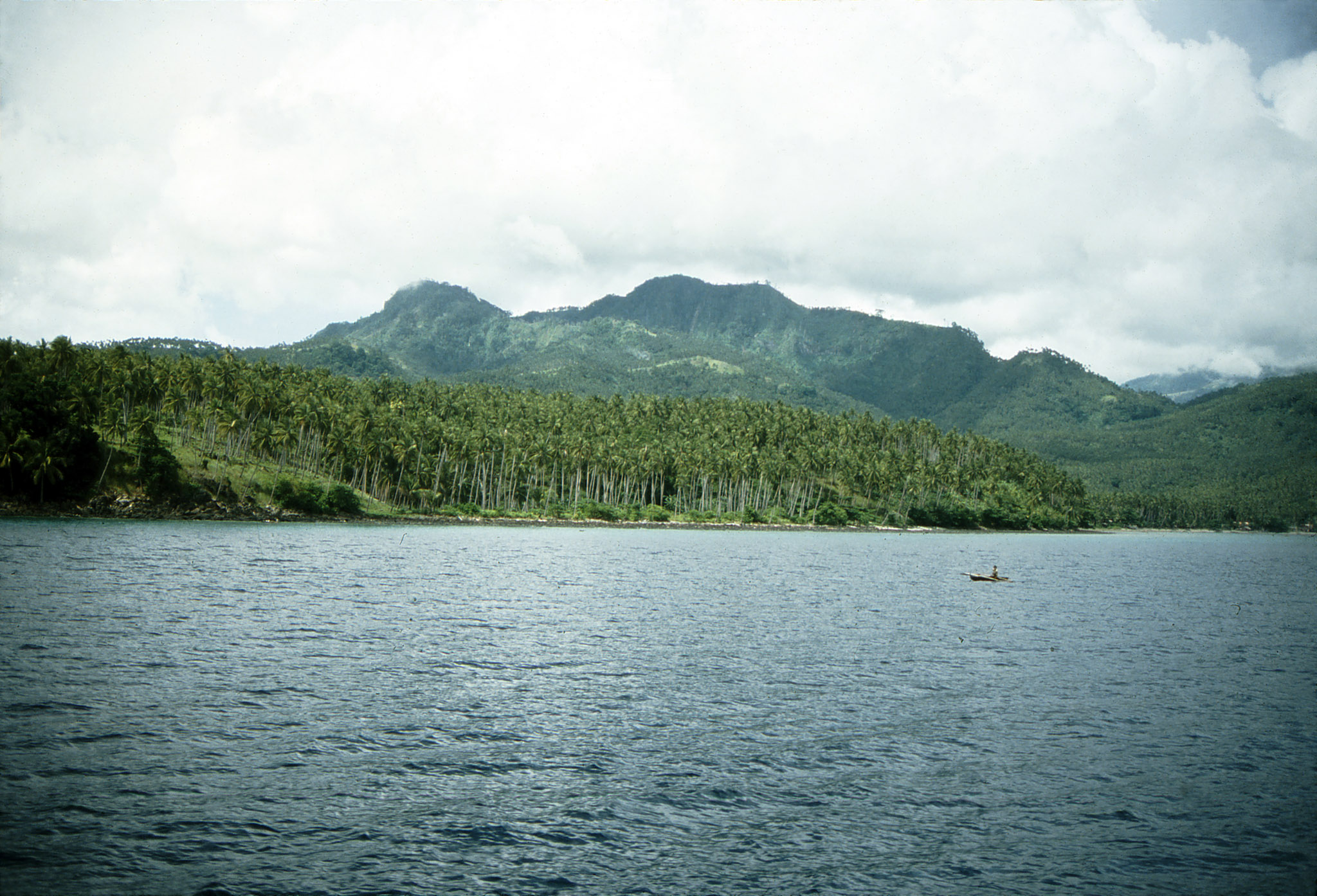
Mount Butay is located near the Port of Benoni.

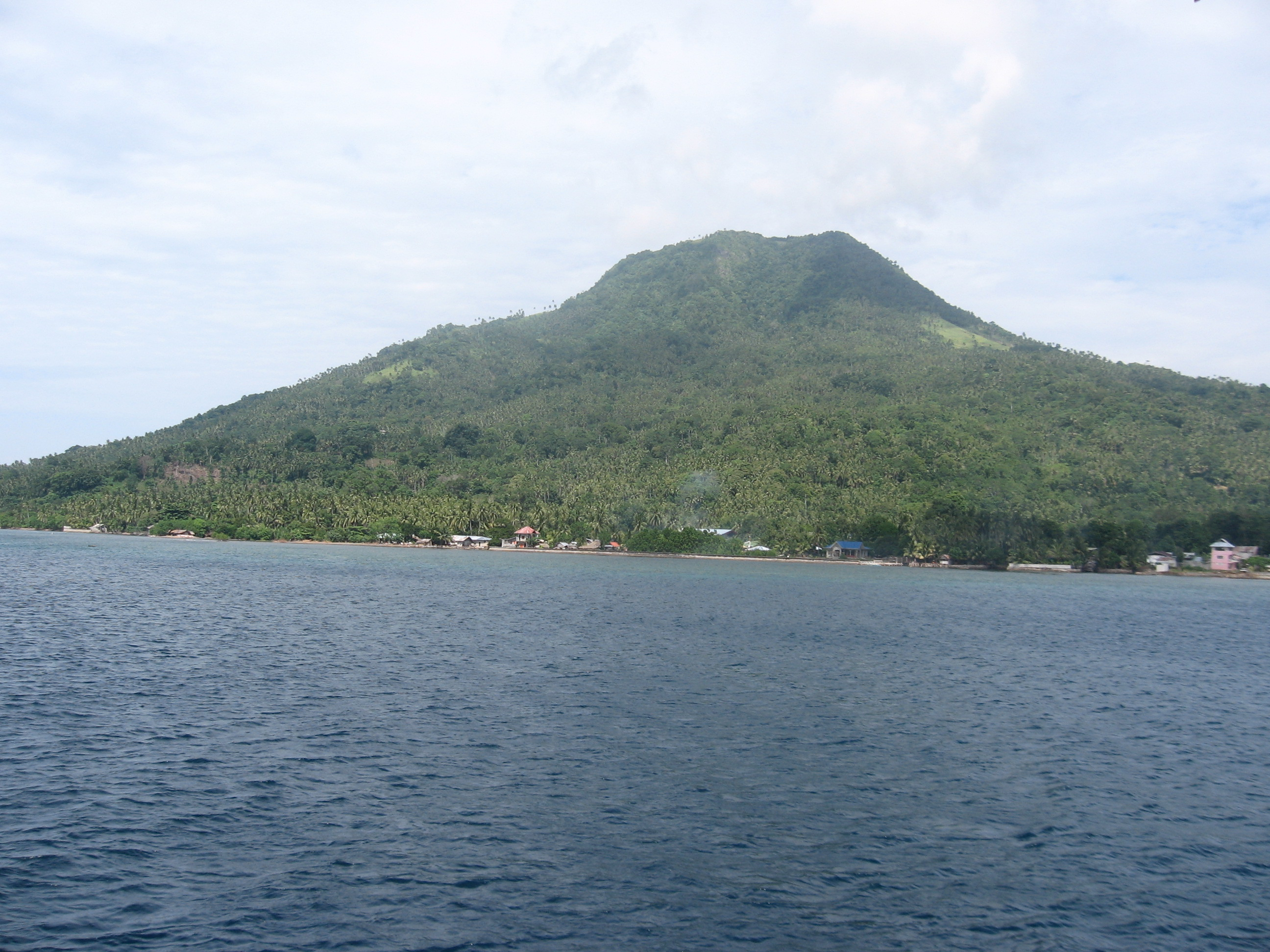
Mount Guisiliban is the southernmost volcano of the island.

=== Islands ===
Located just a few kilometers off the coast are the two islands of Camiguin.

- White Island can be accessed from Agoho which is about 5 kilometers (3.1 mi) west of the town of Mambajao.
- Mantigue Island can be reached from Mahinog about 14 kilometers (8.7 mi) south of Mambajao.

=== Springs ===
- Ardent Hibok-Hibok Hot Spring — At the foot of Hibok-Hibok Volcano flow the mineral pools of Ardent Hot Springs. Wisps of steam can be seen rising from the running waters heated by the cauldron of the mountain, the most recently active of the seven volcanoes on the island.
- Santo Niño Cold Spring and Bura Natural Soda Water Swimming Pool in Catarman are other popular places to get a relaxing dip on the island.
- Tangub Hot Spring is an interesting hot spring located on the shore close to the Sunken Cemetery. Most of the spring is submerged and can be partly seen during low tide. The spring can also be examined by scuba diving or snorkeling, as visibility is excellent and it is also a recommended spot for observing underwater life.

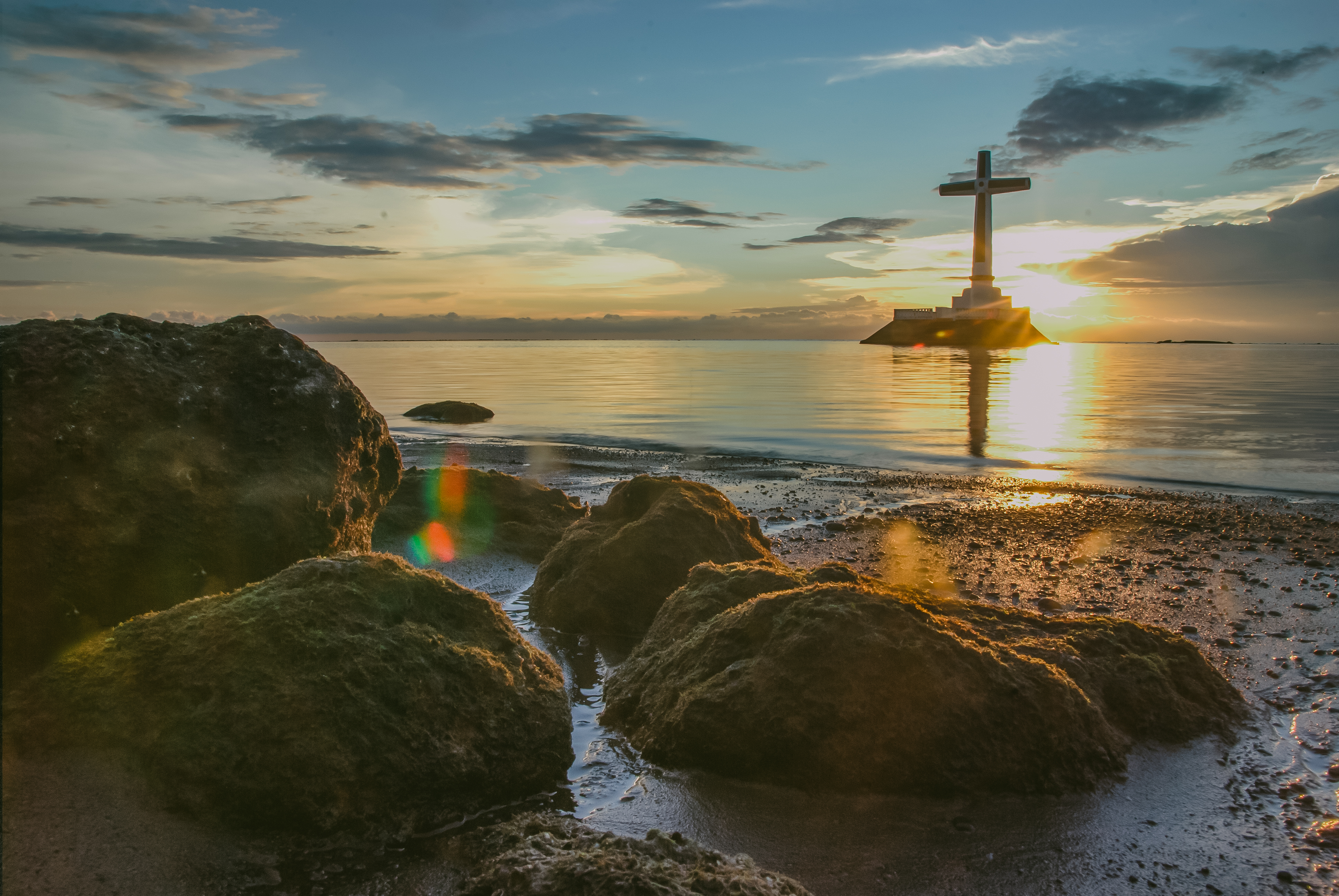
Sunken Cemetery in 2018

=== Sunken cemetery ===
During the volcanic birth of Mt. Vulcan lasting from 1871 to about 1875, some areas in the town of Bonbon subsided, sinking the cemetery of the town to below sea level. The place is commemorated by a huge cross erected in 1982.

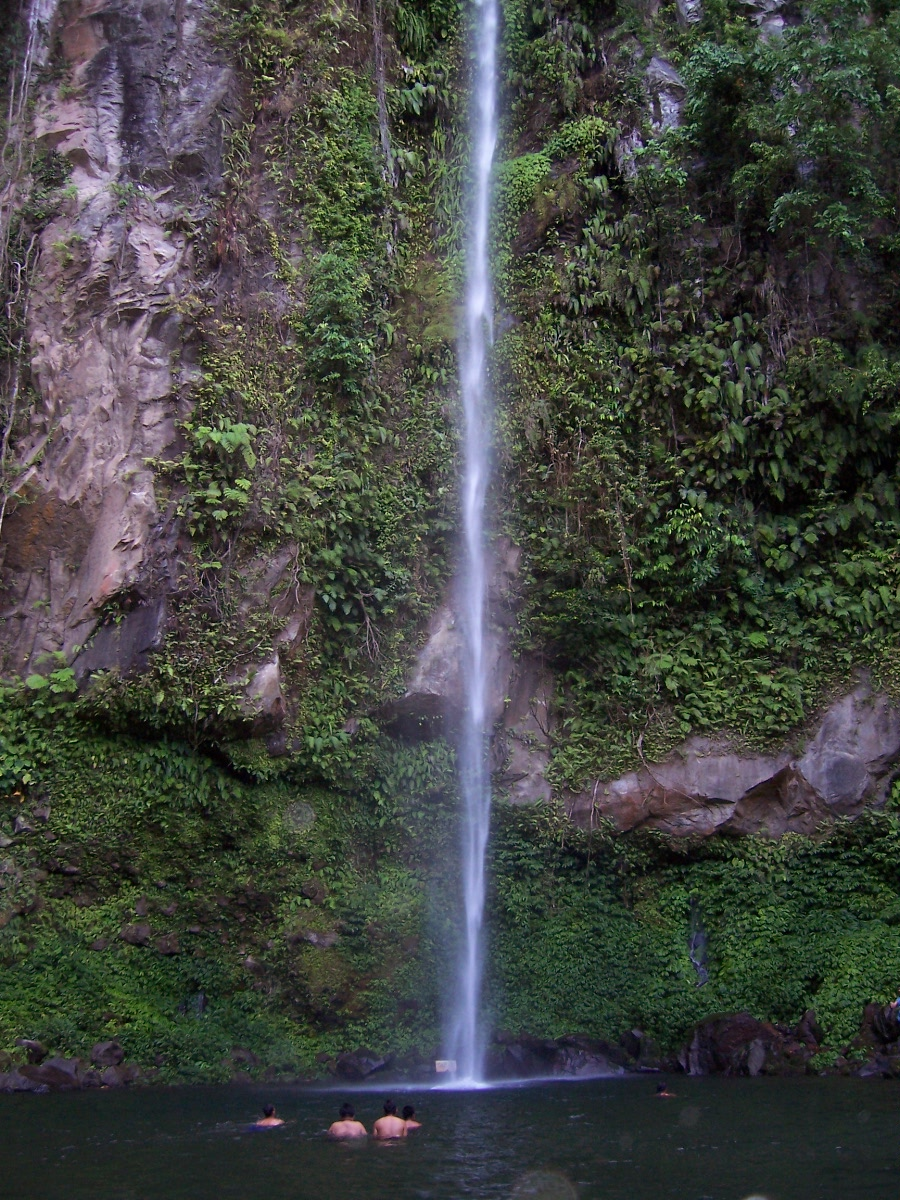
Katibawasan Falls

Since then the municipality of Bonbon has been transferred to the town of Catarman.

=== Waterfalls ===
- Katibawasan Falls — Located 5 kilometers (3.1 mi) southeast of Mambajao, the Katibawasan Falls cascades 250 feet (76 m) down to a pool surrounded by orchids and ferns. An invigorating dip in the pool is popular, especially on warmer days, and there are also several hiking trails within the park. This is the favorite jump-off point for trekkers and mountaineers in search of adventure on the slopes of Mt. Timpoong.
- Tuasan Falls is a 20-meter waterfall, located 6 kilometers (3.7 mi) northeast of Catarman. Unfortunately, accessing the falls no longer entails a scenic hike passing through the Barrio of Mainit, Catarman and along the rocky river bed. The local government, to accommodate local tourism, decided in 2012 to improve access to the falls with a road built all the way up to the falls, which was finished in late 2014. Cars may be parked near the waterfalls, and from there it's just a few minutes to reach the falls and the pool. The pool at the base of the waterfall is deep and clear. As of March 2015, the local government is finalizing construction of the "Trans Island Highway", a road crossing Camiguin from Catarman to Mambajao which runs directly to the left of Tuasan Falls.

=== Protected areas ===
- Timpoong and Hibok-Hibok Natural Monument — Located in the central and western portions of Camiguin, the natural monument preserves an important watershed and center of biodiversity in the Mount Hibok-Hibok and Timpoong ranges. As the island's only remaining forest, it supports the vast majority of the island's endemic and endangered flora and fauna such as the Camiguin hanging parrot, Camiguin hawk-owl and Camiguin forest mouse.
- Giant Clam Sanctuary — Established by a non-government organization called Kabila Giant Clam Conservation and Ocean Nursery, this area is home to various species of corals and giant clams. Currently, 7 out of 9 species of giant clams can be found in the sanctuary.

== Biodiversity ==
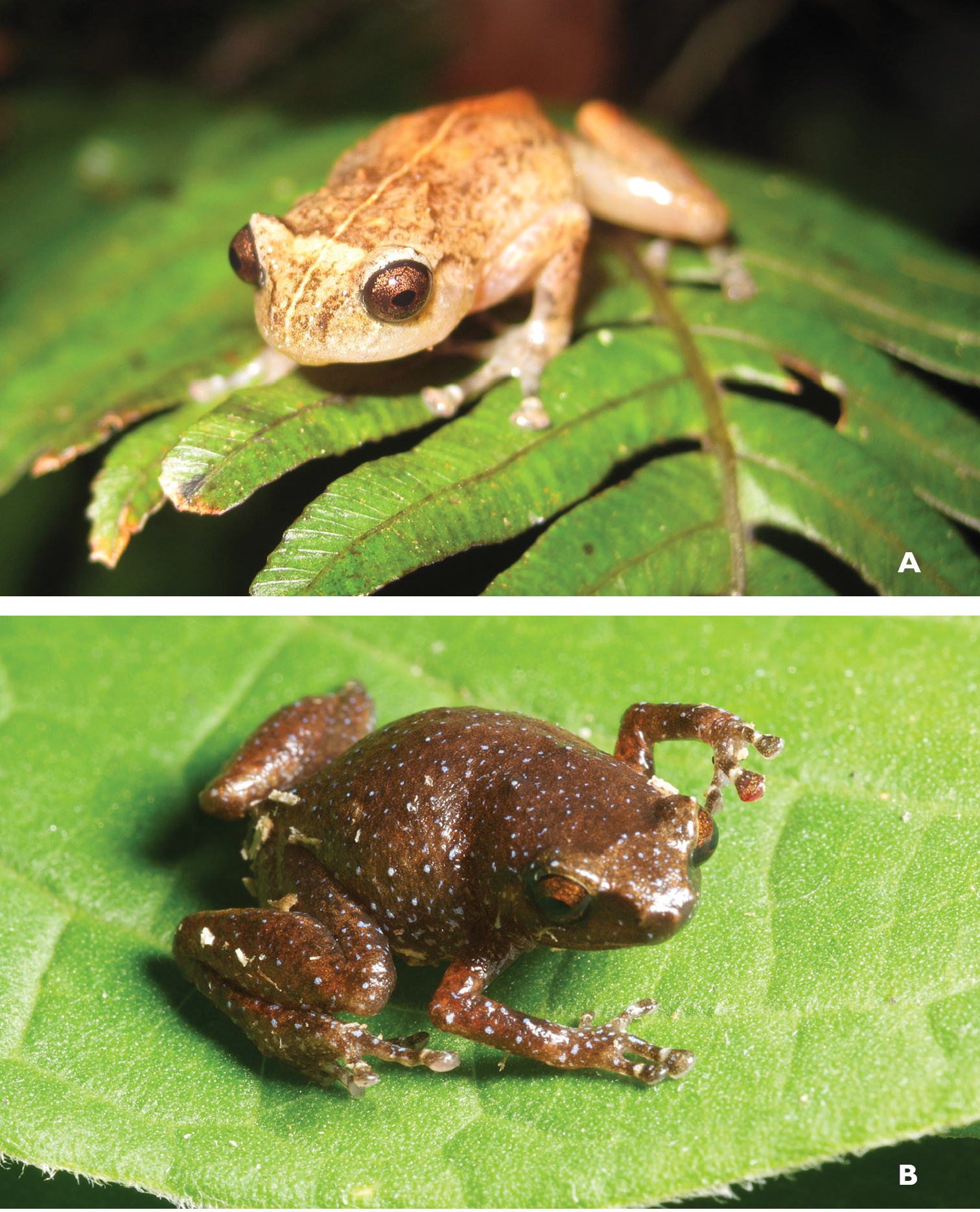
Camiguin volcano cross frog

There are at least six vertebrate species are believed to be endemic to Camiguin.

=== Amphibians ===
Camiguin narrow-mouthed frog (Oreophryne nana).

=== Mammals ===
- Bullimus gamay, or the Camiguin forest rat
- Apomys camiguinensis, the Camiguin forest mouse

=== Birds ===
- Ninox leventisi, or the Camiguin hawk-owl
- Loriculus camiguinensis, the Camiguin hanging parrot
- Hypsipetes catarmanensis, or the Camiguin Bulbul

== Transportation ==
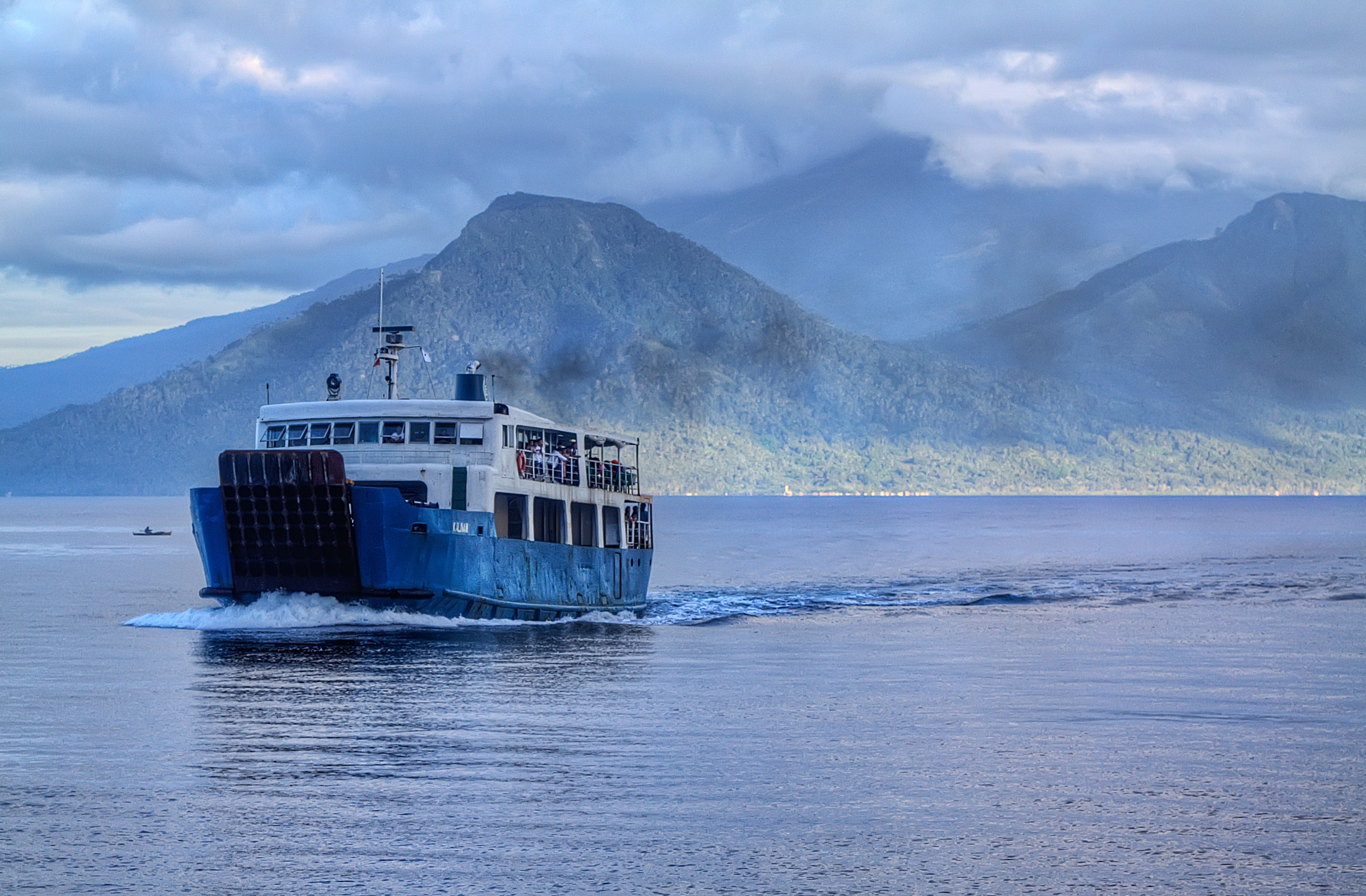
Ferry to Camiguin with Mount Guinsiliban in the background

- Cebu Pacific serves daily flights between Mactan Cebu International Airport and Camiguin Airport.
- Visitors may fly to mainland Mindanao via Laguindingan Airport in Cagayan de Oro in Misamis Oriental province, the gateway to Northern Mindanao. From the airport, a shuttle ride ferries visitors to any point in mainland Mindanao via Agora Bus Terminal in Cagayan de Oro. Eastbound buses take visitors to the port of Balingoan, Misamis Oriental in about two hours. The ferries to Benoni port take just over an hour (depending on weather conditions) and have more scheduled trips as it takes passengers closer to Mambajao. The time between trips varies during the day and runs from 4:00 am to 5:00 pm.
- A Super Shuttle Roro transports passengers daily between Camiguin's Port of Balbagon and Bohol's Port of Jagna.

== Natural calamities ==
=== Volcanic activity from 1871 to 1875 ===
On February 16, 1871, earthquakes began to be felt on the island, which increased in severity until April 30, when a volcanic fissure opened up 400 yards (370 m) southwest of the village of Catarman, northwest of Hibok-Hibok Volcano. Mt. Vulcan was born and continued erupting and pouring lava into the sea, at the same time gaining in height and width. In 1875, the Challenger expedition visited the area and described the mountain as a dome, 1,950 ft (590 m) in height, without any crater, but still smoking and incandescent at the top.

The old town of Catarman was destroyed and a portion of the town sank beneath the sea. The settlement moved to where the town center is presently located. All that remains today of Catarman Viejo are the ruins of the ancient Spanish church, a convent, and a bell tower.

=== Eruptions from 1948 to 1951 ===
From 1948 to 1951, Mt. Hibok-Hibok was constantly rumbling and smoking. The first minor eruption in 1948 caused little damage and loss of life, but in 1949, a larger eruption caused 79 deaths due to pyroclastic flows. The largest eruption occurred in the morning of December 4, 1951. The volcano unleashed lava flows, poisonous gases, and pyroclastic flows destroying nearly 19 square kilometers of land, particularly in Mambajao. All in all, over 3,000 people were killed. Before the eruption of Mt. Hibok-Hibok in 1951, the population of Camiguin had reached 69,000. After the eruption, the population was reduced to about 34,000 due to massive out-migration. Most who left moved to the mainland Mindanao, mainly around Misamis Oriental.

=== Typhoon of 2001 ===
A disastrous typhoon hit the province in the dawn of November 7, 2001. The tropical storm named Lingling (local name Nanang) brought buhawi (torrential downpours) on the mountains, causing multiple massive mudslides which killed about 200 inhabitants, most of whom were missing.

== Notable people ==
- Maymay Entrata – actress, singer, big winner of Pinoy Big Brother: Lucky 7 (born in Mambajao and raised in Cagayan de Oro)

== See also ==
- List of volcanoes in the Philippines
- List of islands in the Philippines
