= Sagay, Camiguin =

Municipality in Camiguin, Philippines

Sagay
- Municipality
- Municipality of Sagay
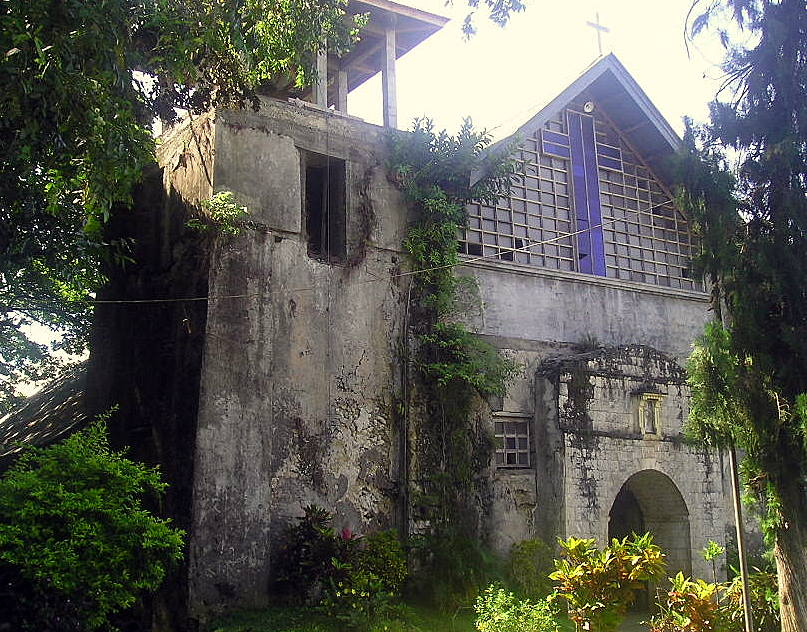
- Sagay Church

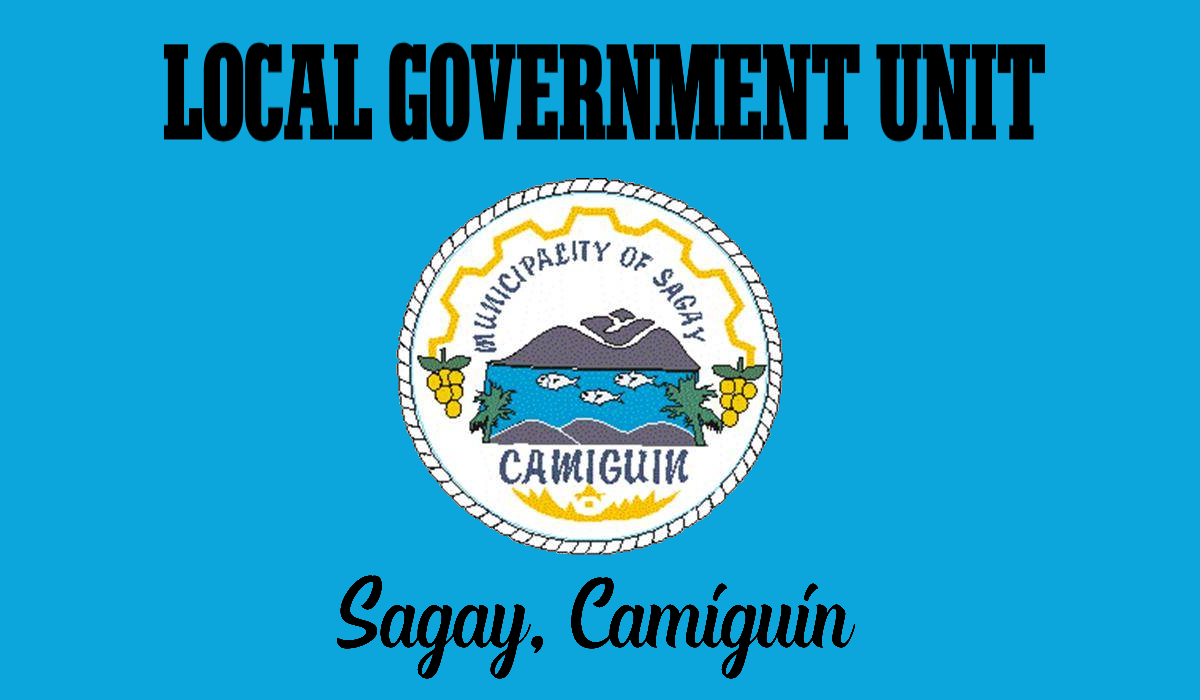
- Flag

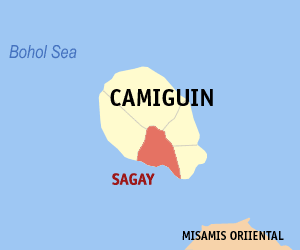
- Map of Camiguin with Sagay highlighted
- Interactive map of Sagay
- Location within the Philippines
- Coordinates: 9°07′N 124°43′E
- Country: Philippines
- Region: Northern Mindanao
- Province: Camiguin
- District: Lone district
- Founded: June 11, 1848
- Barangays: 9 (see Barangays)

Government
  - Type: Sangguniang Bayan
  - Mayor: Joseph G. Uayan (PDPLBN)
  - Vice Mayor: Neil John B. Yanco (PDPLBN)
  - Representative: Jurdin Jesus M. Romualdo
  - Municipal Council: Members: Niel John B. Yangco; Nestor E. Tongol; Roger C. Zaballero; Maria Naomi E. Fuentes; Jose Rufino B. Ladao; Edgar C. Dagaraga; Domyleo P. Dadang; Nestor U. Castañares
  - Electorate: 9,240 voters (2025)

Area
  - Total: 44.13 km^{2} (17.04 sq mi)
- Elevation: 116 m (381 ft)

Population (2024 census)
  - Total: 13,192
  - Density: 298.9/km^{2} (774.2/sq mi)
  - Households: 3,228

Economy
  - Income class: 5th municipal income class
  - Poverty incidence: 22.54% (2023)
  - Revenue: ₱ 95.84 million (2024)
  - Assets: ₱ 252 million (2024)
  - Expenditure: ₱ 102.7 million (2024)
  - Liabilities: ₱ 28.14 million (2024)

Service provider
  - Electricity: Camiguin Electric Cooperative (CAMELCO)
- Time zone: UTC+8 (PST)
- ZIP code: 9103
- PSGC: 1001805000
- IDD : area code: +63 (0)88
- Native languages: Kinamigin; Cebuano; Tagalog
- Website: www.sagaycamiguin.gov.ph

Sagay, officially the Municipality of Sagay, is a municipality in the province of Camiguin, Philippines. According to the 2024 census, it has a population of 13,192 people.

== History ==
The town square of Sagay includes a British cannon. This cannon has been dated at 1707, and is a nine-pounder Demi-Culverin. It can clearly be identified as British by the emblem on the top which includes the Tudor rose. It was possibly left behind in 1763 after the siege of Manila, and perhaps was brought to Camiguin by the Spanish to defend against Moro raiders.

In 1909, the municipality of Sagay was created. Prior to this date, Sagay town had been a part of the municipality of Catarman. Initially, Sagay municipality included the town of Guinsiliban, but that later became a municipality in its own right.

In 1942, the Japanese Occupation forces entered the town of Sagay, Camiguin.

In 1945, the town of Sagay was liberated by the invasion of the Filipino forces of the 6th and 10th Infantry Division of the Philippine Commonwealth Army who attacked the Japanese Imperial forces during the Battle of Camiguin at the end of World War II.

== Geography ==
=== Barangays ===
Sagay is politically subdivided into 9 barangays. Each barangay consists of puroks while some have sitios.

- Alangilan
- Bacnit
- Balite
- Bonbon
- Bugang
- Cuña
- Manuyog
- Mayana
- Poblacion

=== Climate ===
Climate data for Sagay, Camiguin
Month	Jan	Feb	Mar	Apr	May	Jun	Jul	Aug	Sep	Oct	Nov	Dec	Year
Mean daily maximum °C (°F)	28 (82)	29 (84)	30 (86)	31 (88)	30 (86)	30 (86)	30 (86)	30 (86)	30 (86)	30 (86)	29 (84)	29 (84)	30 (85)
Mean daily minimum °C (°F)	24 (75)	24 (75)	24 (75)	25 (77)	26 (79)	26 (79)	25 (77)	25 (77)	25 (77)	25 (77)	25 (77)	25 (77)	25 (77)
Average precipitation mm (inches)	271 (10.7)	217 (8.5)	193 (7.6)	178 (7.0)	344 (13.5)	423 (16.7)	362 (14.3)	358 (14.1)	329 (13.0)	320 (12.6)	322 (12.7)	260 (10.2)	3,577 (140.9)
Average rainy days	23.2	19.5	22.0	22.8	29.6	28.9	30.3	29.8	28.1	28.8	26.1	24.1	313.2
Source: Meteoblue

== Demographics ==
Population census of Sagay
Year	Pop.	±% p.a.
1903	6,321	—
1918	8,551	+2.03%
1939	9,907	+0.70%
1948	18,061	+6.90%
1960	7,552	−7.01%
1970	8,559	+1.26%
1975	7,728	−2.03%
1980	9,120	+3.37%
1990	9,494	+0.40%
1995	9,243	−0.50%
2000	10,356	+2.47%
2007	11,198	+1.08%
2010	11,873	+2.15%
2015	12,626	+1.18%
2020	12,826	+0.33%
2024	13,192	+0.68%
Source: Philippine Statistics Authority

In the 2024 census, the population of Sagay was 13,192 people, with a density of 300 inhabitants per square kilometre or 780 inhabitants per square mile.

== Economy ==
Poverty incidence of Sagay (%)

Source: Philippine Statistics Authority
