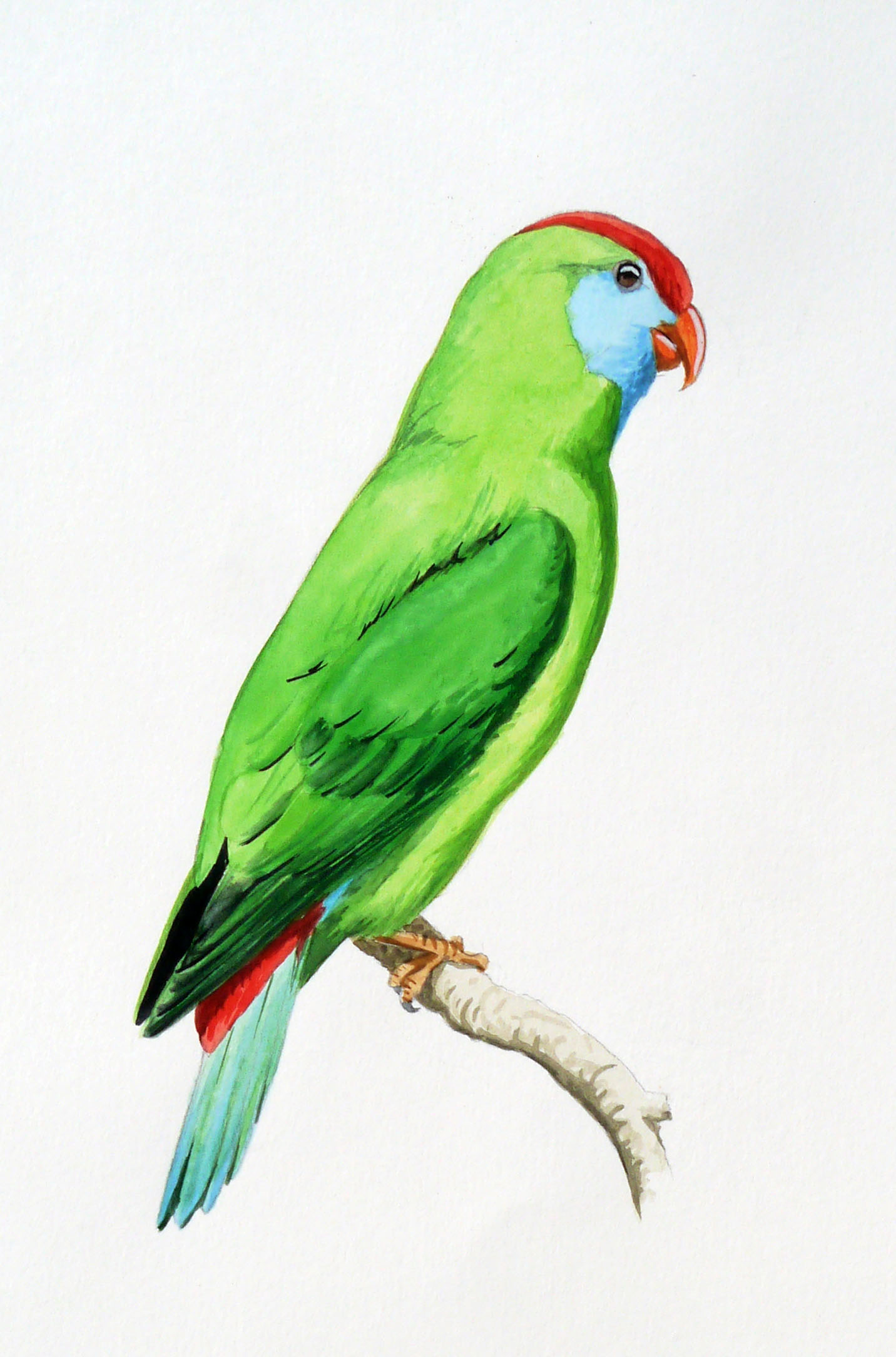

Conservation status
- Vulnerable (IUCN 3.1)

Scientific classification
- Kingdom: Animalia
- Phylum: Chordata
- Class: Aves
- Order: Psittaciformes
- Family: Psittaculidae
- Genus: Loriculus
- Species: L. camiguinensis

Binomial name
- Loriculus camiguinensis Tello, Degner, Bates, JM & Willard, 2006

= Camiguin hanging parrot =

Species of bird

The Camiguin hanging parrot (Loriculus camiguinensis) is a hanging parrot endemic to the Philippine island of Camiguin, where its habitat is diminishing. The taxonomy of this population of parrots on Camiguin is uncertain. This species has been listed as vulnerable on the IUCN Red List, is declining primarily due to the cagebird trade. Population estimates of this species are between 500 - 2,500 mature individuals.

== Description and taxonomy ==
The Camiguin hanging parrot is mostly green with blue throat, face and thighs, and a red tail and red crown. Males and female birds look identical, which is unusual for a hanging parrot native to the Philippines. Only the males of all the other populations living on other islands have a red area on their fronts.Voice includes a rapid "tsik-tsik-tsik!"

In 2006, the hanging parrots living on the island of Camiguin, off the northern coast of Mindanao, were described as a separate species than the Philippine hanging parrot (Loriculus philippensis). It is differentiated by its blue face, red crown, longer tail and lack of sexual dimorphism. However, more research and DNA analysis is required to clarify their taxonomy.

== Ecology and behavior ==
Diet consists of nectar, seeds, wild bananas of the Musa genus, soft fruit, berries and flowers. Mostly seen alone but also occurs in pairs and small groups.

Breeding season is September to November. Nests in tree cavities in dead tree-ferns.

== Habitat and conservation status ==
This species is only found in lowland forest and secondary growth from 150 to 1,700 meters above sea level.

The International Union for Conservation of Nature has not yet recognised this species as separate and thus has not yet assessed the Camiguin hanging parrot. It is generally believed that this species is threatened as it is already rare on the island. It is severely threatened by illegal wildlife trade.
