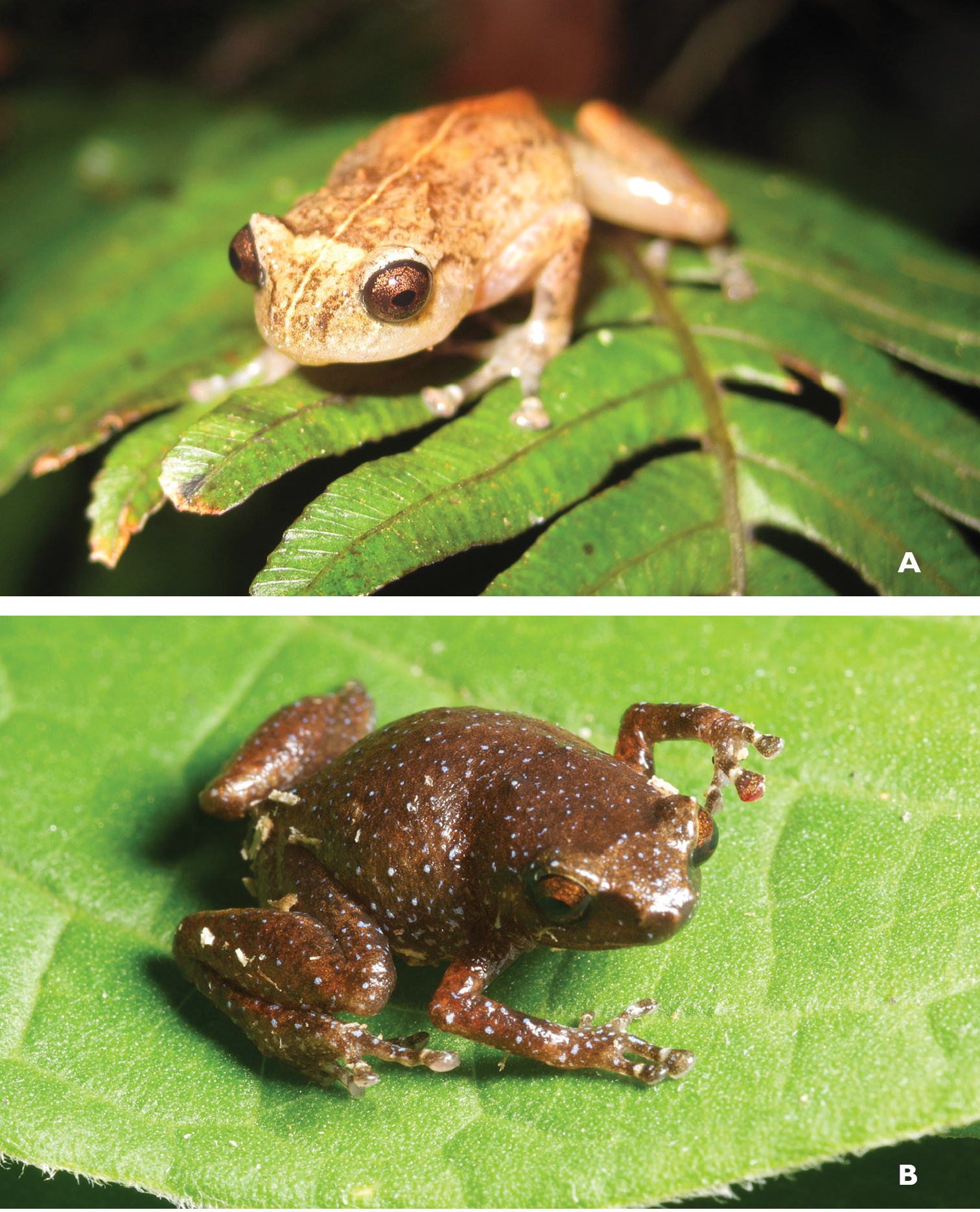
- Aphantophryne cf. nana males from Mindanao: it is uncertain whether these specimens belong to Aphantophryne nana.

Conservation status
- Near Threatened (IUCN 3.1)

Scientific classification
- Kingdom: Animalia
- Phylum: Chordata
- Class: Amphibia
- Order: Anura
- Family: Microhylidae
- Genus: Aphantophryne
- Species: A. nana

Binomial name
- Aphantophryne nana (Brown and Alcala, 1967)

Synonyms
- Oreophryne nana Brown and Alcala, 1967

= Aphantophryne nana =

Species of amphibian

Aphantophryne nana is a species of frog in the family Microhylidae. It is endemic to the Philippines and is known with certainty only from the island of Camiguin. It is unclear whether similar frogs from northeast Mindanao are referable to this species. It was described as Oreophryne nana, but based on molecular data it was moved to Aphantophryne in 2017. Common names Camiguin cross frog, Camiguin narrow-mouthed frog, and volcano cross frog have been coined for the species.

== Description ==
Aphantophryne nana are small, moderately slender-bodied frogs. Adult females in the type series measure 17–20 mm (0.7–0.8 in) in snout–vent length; no males were collected. The head is broader than it is long. The snout is short and bluntly round–pointed. The canthus rostralis is rounded. The tympanum is distinct. The fingers and the toes are dilated into moderately large disks (with the exception of the first finger). Skin is smooth. Preserved specimens are dusky brown, apart from the blackish snout, upper eyelids, and axillary and loreal regions.

Aphantophryne nana differs from Aphantophryne anulata by the absence of subarticular tubercles on the hand, but the diagnostic value of this character has been questioned because specimens from Mindanao show a variable degree of distinctiveness for this trait.

== Habitat and conservation ==
Aphantophryne nana occurs in mossy and montane rainforests. The types were collected in dipterocarp forest at elevations between 550 and 910 m (1,800 and 3,000 ft) above sea level. Eggs presumably belonging to this species have been found under mosses. Development is direct, without a free-living tadpole stage.

Aphantophryne nana is rare on Camiguin. Shifting agriculture and illegal logging threaten its habitat at lower altitudes.
