= 2013 Philippine gubernatorial elections =

- May 13, 2013

All 80 provincial governorships
	First party	Second party	Third party
Party	Liberal	NPC	Nacionalista
Last election	13 (16%)	9 (11%)	10 (13%)
Seats before	37 (46%)	10 (13%)	5 (6%)
Seats after	38 (48%)	13 (16%)	6 (8%)
Seat change	▲1	▲3	▲1
	Fourth party	Fifth party	Sixth party
Party	NUP	UNA	Lakas
Last election	N/A	2 (3%)	41 (51%)
Seats before	8 (10%)	8 (10%)	2 (3%)
Seats after	8 (10%)	4 (5%)	1 (1%)
Seat change	Steady	▼4	▼1
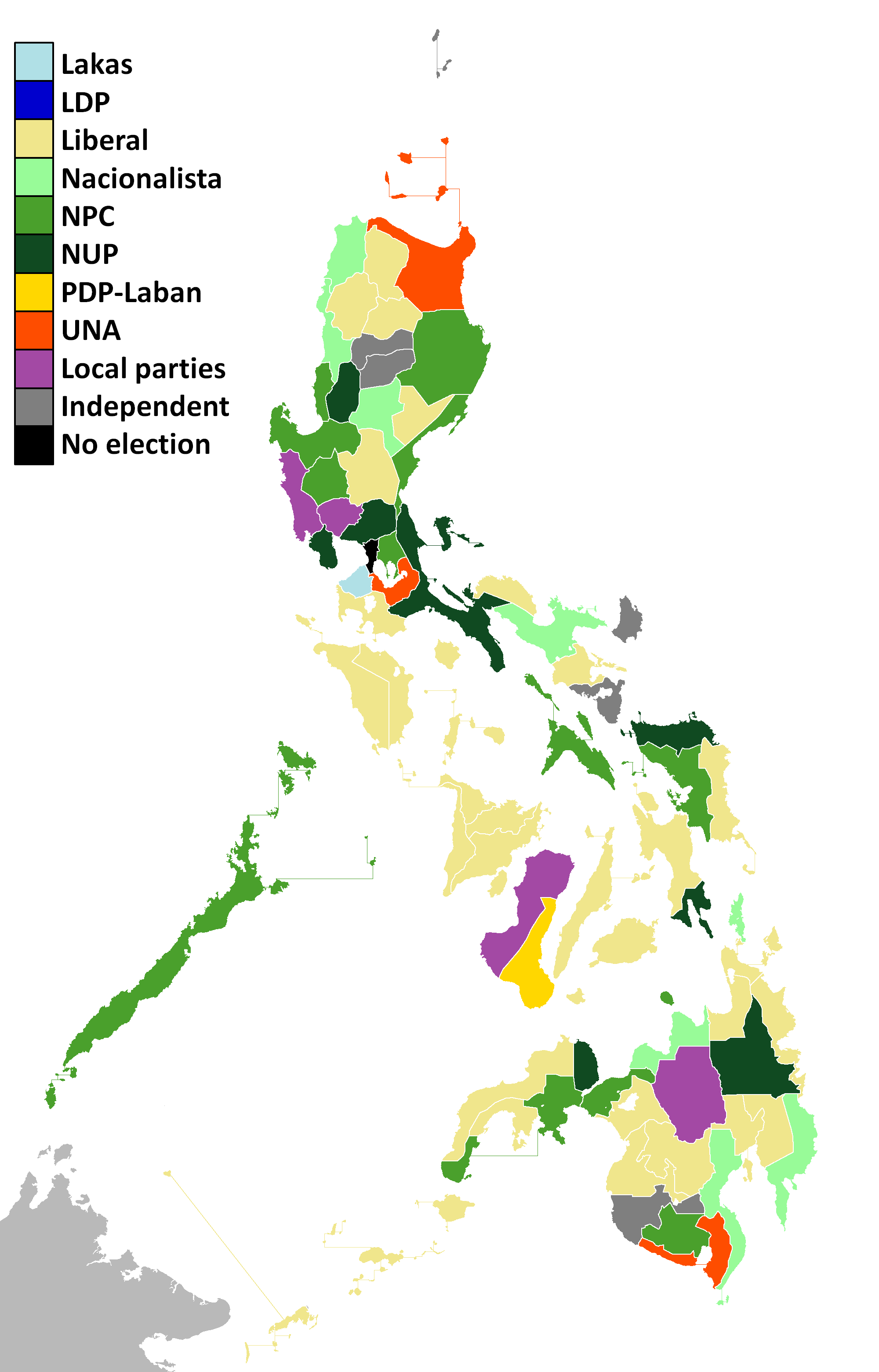
- Results of the election

Gubernatorial elections were held in the Philippines on May 13, 2013. All provinces elected their provincial governors for three-year terms who will be inaugurated on June 30, 2013, after their proclamation. Governors that are currently serving their third consecutive terms are prohibited from running as governors (they may run in any other position).

Highly urbanized cities and independent component cities such as Angeles City, Cebu City, and Metro Manila with the municipality of Pateros are outside the jurisdiction of any province and thus won't elect for governors of their mother provinces (Pampanga and Cebu, for Angeles and Cebu City, respectively). These cities and Pateros would elect mayors instead.

== Summary ==
Party	2010 elections	Before elections	Gains	Holds	Losses	Total	%	Change (vs. before)
Liberal	13	37	6	32	5	38	47.5%	▲1
NPC	9	10	3	10	0	13	16.3%	▲3
NUP	—N/a	8	1	7	1	8	10.0%	Steady
Nacionalista	10	5	3	3	2	6	7.5%	▲1
UNA	—N/a	7	1	2	5	3	3.8%	▼4
PDP–Laban	0	1	0	1	0	1	1.3%	Steady
Lakas	41**	2	0	1	1	1	1.3%	▼1
LDP	1	1	0	0	1	0	0.0%	▼1
Local parties	0	5	0	4	1	4	5.0%	▼1
Independent	1	4	3	3	1	6	7.5%	▲2
Totals	80	80	17	63	17	80	100%	Steady

*Election results for Pwersa ng Masang Pilipino, as the Partido Demokratiko Pilipino-Lakas ng Bayan did not win governorships in 2010.
**Election results as Lakas-Kampi.

== Luzon ==
=== Ilocos Region ===
==== Ilocos Norte ====
Incumbent governor Imee Marcos is running for reelection unopposed.

Ilocos Norte gubernatorial election
Party	Candidate	Votes	%
Nacionalista	Imee Marcos (incumbent)	244,092	100.00
Total votes		244,092	100.00
Nacionalista hold			

==== Ilocos Sur ====
Incumbent governor Chavit Singson is not running. His son, incumbent congressman Ryan Singson is running in his place.

Ilocos Sur (Note: Incumbent governor Chavit Singson is not running. His son, incumbent congressman Ryan Singson is running in his place.) gubernatorial election
Party	Candidate	Votes	%
Nacionalista	Ryan Luis Singson	208,715	67.64
Liberal	Roque Versoza	99,852	32.36
Total votes		308,567	100.00
Nacionalista gain from Independent			

==== La Union ====
Incumbent governor Manuel Ortega is running for reelection. His opponent is former congressman Tomas Dumpit.

La Union gubernatorial election
Party	Candidate	Votes	%
NPC	Manuel Ortega (incumbent)	281,544	89.06
NUP	Tomas Dumpit	34,595	10.94
Total votes		316,139	100.00
NPC hold			

==== Pangasinan ====
Incumbent governor Amado Espino, Jr. is running for reelection. His opponent is incumbent Alaminos Mayor Hernani Braganza.

Pangasinan gubernatorial election
Party	Candidate	Votes	%
NPC	Amado Espino, Jr. (incumbent)	851,760	74.12
Liberal	Hernani Braganza	297,409	25.88
Total votes		1,149,169	100.00
NPC hold			

=== Cagayan Valley ===
==== Batanes ====
Incumbent governor Vicente Gato is running for reelection as an independent. His opponent is former governor Telesforo Castillejos.

Batanes gubernatorial election
Party	Candidate	Votes	%
Independent	Vicente Gato (incumbent)	3,959	45.41
Liberal	Marilou Cayco	2,389	27.40
UNA	Telesforo Castillejos	2,371	27.19
Total votes		8,719	100.00
Independent hold			

==== Cagayan ====
Incumbent governor Alvaro Antonio is running for reelection. His opponent is incumbent Tuao Mayor William Mamba.

Cagayan gubernatorial election
Party	Candidate	Votes	%
UNA	Alvaro Antonio (incumbent)	282,647	62.98
Liberal	William Mamba	165,961	37.02
Total votes		448,338	100.00
UNA hold			

==== Isabela ====
Incumbent governor Faustino Dy III is running for reelection. Candidates Tony Aliangan and Lilia Uy were disqualified by Comelec.

Isabela gubernatorial election
Party	Candidate	Votes	%
NPC	Faustino Dy III (incumbent)	358,998	86.10
Aksyon	Marlo Angelo Padaca	47,537	11.40
Independent	Glorietta Almazan	10,440	2.50
Total votes		416,975	100.00
NPC hold			

==== Nueva Vizcaya ====
Incumbent governor Luisa Cuaresma is term-limited and running for congress instead. Jose Gambito is her party's nominee.

Nueva Vizcaya (Note: Incumbent governor Luisa Cuaresma is term limited and is running for congresswoman.) gubernatorial election
Party	Candidate	Votes	%
Nacionalista	Ruth Padilla	69,637	41.61
UNA	Jose Gambito	50,482	30.16
Liberal	Donna Lyn Gerdan	35,059	20.95
PMP	John Severino Bagasao	12,194	7.29
Total votes		167,372	100.00
Nacionalista gain from UNA			

==== Quirino ====
Incumbent governor Junie Cua is running for reelection unopposed.

Quirino gubernatorial election
Party	Candidate	Votes	%
Liberal	Junie Cua (incumbent)	68,980	100.00
Total votes		68,980	100.00
Liberal hold			

=== Cordillera Administrative Region ===
==== Abra ====
Incumbent governor Eustaquio Bersamin is running for reelection. His primary opponent is former congresswoman Cecilia Seares-Luna. Candidate Joel Bicera Bersamin was disqualified by Comelec.

Abra gubernatorial election
Party	Candidate	Votes	%
Liberal	Eustaquio Bersamin (incumbent)	93,776	80.34
Lakas	Cecilia Seares-Luna	22,946	19.66
Total votes		116,722	100.00
Liberal hold			

==== Apayao ====
Incumbent governor Elias Bulut Jr. is running for reelection.

Apayao gubernatorial election
Party	Candidate	Votes	%
Liberal	Elias Bulut Jr. (incumbent)	41,844	93.34
UNA	Amado Almazan	2,988	6.66
Total votes		44,832	100.00
Liberal hold			

==== Benguet ====
Incumbent governor Nestor Fongwan is running for reelection.

Benguet gubernatorial election
Party	Candidate	Votes	%
NUP	Nestor Fongwan (incumbent)	108,950	73.85
Liberal	Jerome Selmo	38,584	26.15
Total votes		147,534	100.00
NUP hold			

==== Ifugao ====
Incumbent governor Eugene Balitang is running for reelection.

Ifugao gubernatorial election
Party	Candidate	Votes	%
Independent	Dennis Habawel	38,177	45.41
Liberal	Eugene Balitang (incumbent)	20,299	24.14
NPC	Jonathan Cuyahon	18,374	21.85
Independent	Robert Humiwat	7,230	8.60
Total votes		84,080	100.00
Independent gain from Liberal			

==== Kalinga ====
Incumbent governor Jocel Baac is running for reelection.

Kalinga gubernatorial election
Party	Candidate	Votes	%
Liberal	Jocel Baac (incumbent)	63,213	65.36
PDP–Laban	Conrado Dieza	33,498	34.64
Total votes		96,711	100.00
Liberal hold			

==== Mountain Province ====
Incumbent governor Leonard Mayaen is running for reelection.

Mountain Province gubernatorial election
Party	Candidate	Votes	%
Independent	Leonard Mayaen (incumbent)	40,260	55.53
Independent	Arnolfo Pilando	27,151	37.45
NPC	Harry Dominguez	5,095	7.03
Total votes		72,506	100.00
Independent hold			

=== Central Luzon ===
==== Aurora ====
Incumbent governor Bellaflor Angara-Castillo is term-limited and therefore decides to run for Congress instead. Her brother, incumbent Baler Mayor Arturo Angara is running in her place.

Aurora (Note: Incumbent governor Bellaflor Angara-Castillo is term-limited and is running for congresswoman. Her brother, incumbent senator Edgardo Angara is running in her place.) gubernatorial election
Party	Candidate	Votes	%
NPC	Gerardo Noveras	51,211	56.33
LDP	Arturo Angara	39,696	43.67
Total votes		90,907	100.00
NPC gain from LDP			

==== Bataan ====
Incumbent governor Tet Garcia is term-limited and is running for congressman. His son Albert Garcia is running in his place.

Bataan (Note: Incumbent governor Carlito Marquez is term limited.) gubernatorial election
Party	Candidate	Votes	%
NUP	Albert Garcia	257,596	74.93
NPC	Joel Payumo	82,878	24.11
Independent	Patrick Santos	3,311	0.96
Total votes		343,785	100.00
NUP hold			

==== Bulacan ====
Incumbent governor Wilhelmino Sy-Alvarado is running for reelection. Candidate Jaime Almera was disqualified by COMELEC.

Bulacan gubernatorial election
Party	Candidate	Votes	%
NUP	Wilhelmino Sy-Alvarado (incumbent)	894,593	100.00
Total votes		894,593	100.00
NUP hold			

==== Nueva Ecija ====
Incumbent governor Aurelio Umali is running for reelection. His opponent is incumbent congresswoman Josefina Joson.

Nueva Ecija gubernatorial election
Party	Candidate	Votes	%
Liberal	Aurelio Umali (incumbent)	556,319	62.23
NPC	Josefina Joson	337,708	37.77
Total votes		894,027	100.00
Liberal hold			

==== Pampanga ====
Incumbent governor Lilia Pineda is running for reelection. Her main opponent is former governor Ed Panlilio.

Pampanga gubernatorial election
Party	Candidate	Votes	%
KAMBILAN	Lilia Pineda (incumbent)	594,011	78.91
Liberal	Ed Panlilio	148,376	19.71
Independent	Jose Montemayor Jr.	6,262	0.83
Independent	Joe Ocampo	4,110	0.55
Total votes		752,759	100.00
KAMBILAN hold			

==== Tarlac ====
Incumbent governor Victor Yap is running for reelection. His opponent is incumbent Vice-Governor Pearl Pacada and Dr. Isa Cojuanco-Suntay.

Tarlac gubernatorial election
Party	Candidate	Votes	%
NPC	Victor Yap (incumbent)	328,558	63.75
Independent	Isa Cojuanco-Suntay	121,874	23.65
Lakas	Pearl Angeli Pacada	64,951	12.60
Total votes		515,383	100.00
NPC hold			

==== Zambales ====
Incumbent governor Hermogenes Ebdane is running for reelection. His opponent is former governor Amor Deloso.

Zambales gubernatorial election
Party	Candidate	Votes	%
SZP	Hermogenes Ebdane (incumbent)	130,960	54.71
Liberal	Amor Deloso	108,393	45.29
Total votes		239,353	100.00

=== Calabarzon ===
==== Batangas ====
Incumbent governor Vilma Santos Recto is running for reelection.

Batangas gubernatorial election
Party	Candidate	Votes	%
Liberal	Vilma Santos-Recto (incumbent)	878,579	93.50
Independent	Marcos Mandanas Sr.	55,494	5.91
Independent	Praxedes Bustamante	5,618	0.60
Total votes		939,691	100.00
Liberal hold			

==== Cavite ====
Incumbent governor Jonvic Remulla is running for reelection running against incumbent congressman and former governor Ayong Maliksi.

Cavite gubernatorial election
Party	Candidate	Votes	%
Lakas	Jonvic Remulla (incumbent)	612,521	54.53
Liberal	Ayong Maliksi	510,767	45.47
Total votes		1,123,288	100.00
Lakas hold			

==== Laguna ====
Incumbent governor E. R. Ejercito is running for reelection. His opponent is incumbent congressman Edgar San Luis.

Laguna gubernatorial election
Party	Candidate	Votes	%
UNA	E. R. Ejercito (incumbent)	549,310	53.83
Liberal	Edgar San Luis	471,209	46.17
Total votes		1,020,519	100.00
UNA hold			

==== Quezon ====
Incumbent governor David Suarez is running for reelection.

Quezon gubernatorial election
Party	Candidate	Votes	%
NUP	David Suarez (incumbent)	418,895	53.65
Liberal	Irvin Alcala	358,943	45.97
Independent	Rolando Merano	2,920	0.37
Total votes		780,758	100.00
NUP hold			

==== Rizal ====
Incumbent governor Casimiro Ynares III is running for mayor of Antipolo. His mother, former governor Rebecca Ynares is running in his place.

Rizal (Note: Incumbent governor Casimiro Ynares III is running for mayor of Antipolo. His mother, former governor Rebecca Ynares is running in his place.) gubernatorial election
Party	Candidate	Votes	%
NPC	Rebecca Ynares	616,573	78.13
Independent	Esteban Salonga	162,457	20.59
Independent	Anamariela Bush	10,143	1.29
Total votes		789,173	100.00

=== Mimaropa ===
==== Marinduque ====
Incumbent governor Carmencita Reyes is running for reelection. Her opponents are vice governor Antonio Uy Jr. and former governor Jose Antonio Carrion.

Marinduque gubernatorial election
Party	Candidate	Votes	%
Liberal	Carmencita Reyes (incumbent)	53,869	54.74
NUP	Antonio Uy Jr.	25,836	26.25
NPC	Jose Antonio Carrion	18,706	19.01
Total votes		98,411	100.00
Liberal hold			

==== Occidental Mindoro ====
Incumbent governor Josephine Sato is term limited and is running for congresswoman. Incumbent vice governor Mario Gene Mendiola is her party's nominee.

Occidental Mindoro (Note: Incumbent governor Josephine Sato is term limited and is running for congresswoman.) gubernatorial election
Party	Candidate	Votes	%
Liberal	Mario Gene Mendiola	96,673	56.99
Lakas	Girlie Villarosa	71,280	42.01
Independent	Alejo Fantone	1,690	1.00
Total votes		169,643	100.00
Liberal hold			

==== Oriental Mindoro ====
Incumbent governor Alfonso Umali Jr. is running for reelection unopposed.

Oriental Mindoro gubernatorial election
Party	Candidate	Votes	%
Liberal	Alfonso Umali Jr. (incumbent)	216,533	100.00
Total votes		216,533	100.00
Liberal hold			

==== Palawan ====
Incumbent governor Abraham Mitra is running for reelection.

Palawan gubernatorial election
Party	Candidate	Votes	%
NPC	Jose Alvarez	196,302	61.06
Liberal	Abraham Mitra (incumbent)	123,881	38.54
KBL	Richard Lopez	1,292	0.40
Total votes		321,475	100.00
NPC gain from Liberal			

==== Romblon ====
Incumbent governor Eduardo Firmalo is running for reelection.

Romblon gubernatorial election
Party	Candidate	Votes	%
Liberal	Eduardo Firmalo (incumbent)	91,912	78.55
UNA	Bernie Fondevilla	25,093	21.45
Total votes		117,005	100.00
Liberal hold			

=== Bicol Region ===
==== Albay ====
Incumbent governor Joey Salceda is running for reelection unopposed.

Albay gubernatorial election
Party	Candidate	Votes	%
Liberal	Joey Salceda (incumbent)	431,043	100.00
Total votes		431,043	100.00
Liberal hold			

==== Camarines Norte ====
Incumbent governor Edgar Tallado is running for reelection. His opponents are 1st District Congressman Renato Unico Jr. and former governor Jesus Typoco Jr.

Camarines Norte gubernatorial election
Party	Candidate	Votes	%
Liberal	Edgar Tallado (incumbent)	116,270	53.82
NUP	Renato Unico Jr.	97,568	45.16
Nacionalista	Jesus Typoco Jr.	2,194	1.02
Total votes		216,032	100.00
Liberal hold			

==== Camarines Sur ====
Incumbent governor Luis Raymund Villafuerte is term limited and is running for congressman. His son, Miguel Luis Villafuerte is running in his place. His primary opponents are his grandfather, incumbent congressman Luis Villafuerte and former Solicitor General Jose Anselmo Cadiz.

Camarines Sur (Note: Incumbent governor Luis Raymund Villafuerte is term limited and is running for congressman. His son, Miguel Luis Villafuerte is running in his place.) gubernatorial election
Party	Candidate	Votes	%
Nacionalista	Miguel Luis Villafuerte	263,792	43.53
NPC	Luis Villafuerte	200,086	33.02
Liberal	Jose Anselmo Cadiz	135,022	22.28
KBL	Joel Pelo	4,810	0.79
Independent	William Iliw Iliw	2,274	0.38
Total votes		605,984	100.00
Nacionalista hold			

==== Catanduanes ====
Incumbent governor Joseph Cua is running for reelection.

Catanduanes gubernatorial election
Party	Candidate	Votes	%
Independent	Araceli Wong	67,252	51.81
Liberal	Joseph Cua (incumbent)	60,831	46.87
Independent	Pio Jose Joson	1,351	1.04
Independent	Larry Que	359	0.28
Total votes		129,793	100.00
Independent gain from Liberal			

==== Masbate ====
Incumbent governor Rizalina Seachon-Lanete is running for reelection. Her opponents are incumbent congressman Antonio Kho and Catholic priest Leo Casas.

Masbate gubernatorial election
Party	Candidate	Votes	%
NPC	Rizalina Seachon-Lanete (incumbent)	158,666	50.53
Lakas	Antonio Kho	124,454	39.63
Liberal	Leo Casas	26,998	8.60
Independent	Romeo Alburo, Jr.	3,896	1.24
Total votes		314,014	100.00
NPC hold			

==== Sorsogon ====
Incumbent governor Raul Lee is running for reelection.

Sorsogon gubernatorial election
Party	Candidate	Votes	%
UNA	Raul Lee (incumbent)	123,232	44.32
Independent	Marc Eric Dioneda	118,889	42.75
Liberal	Renato Laurinaria	33,522	12.06
Independent	Amadeo Brin	2,428	0.87
Total votes		278,071	100.00
UNA hold			

== Visayas ==
=== Western Visayas ===
==== Aklan ====
Incumbent governor Carlito Marquez is term-limited. Incumbent Congressman Florencio Miraflores is his party's nominee. Miraflores would be challenged by Makato mayor Ramon Legaspi Jr.

Aklan (Note: Incumbent governor Carlito Marquez is term limited.) gubernatorial election
Party	Candidate	Votes	%
Liberal	Florencio Miraflores	122,427	55.28
UNA	Ramon Legaspi Jr.	99,034	44.72
Total votes		221,461	100.00
Liberal hold			

==== Antique ====
Incumbent governor Exequiel Javier is running for reelection. His opponent is lawyer Cornelio Aldon.

Antique gubernatorial election
Party	Candidate	Votes	%
Liberal	Exequiel Javier (incumbent)	112,668	52.14
UNA	Cornelio Aldon	103,409	47.86
Total votes		216,077	100.00
Liberal hold			

==== Capiz ====
Incumbent governor Victor Tanco Sr. is running for reelection.

Capiz gubernatorial election
Party	Candidate	Votes	%
Liberal	Victor Tanco Sr. (incumbent)	232,986	77.84
UNA	Joel Longares Sr.	66,317	22.16
Total votes		299,303	100.00
Liberal hold			

==== Guimaras ====
Incumbent governor Felipe Hilian Nava is running for reelection.

Guimaras gubernatorial election
Party	Candidate	Votes	%
Liberal	Samuel Gumarin	40,859	52.63
UNA	Felipe Hilian Nava (incumbent)	36,068	46.46
Independent	Edgardo Junco	710	0.91
Total votes		77,637	100.00
Liberal gain from UNA			

==== Iloilo ====
Incumbent governor Arthur Defensor Sr. is running for reelection. His opponent is incumbent representative Ferjenel Biron.

Iloilo gubernatorial election
Party	Candidate	Votes	%
Liberal	Arthur Defensor Sr. (incumbent)	431,520	57.04
UNA	Ferjenel Biron	319,768	42.27
Independent	Toto Serapio Camposano	5,288	0.70
Total votes		756,576	100.00
Liberal hold			

==== Negros Occidental ====
Incumbent governor Alfredo Marañon successfully contested his reelection. His opponent was Vice Governor Genaro Alvarez Jr.

Negros Occidental gubernatorial election
Party	Candidate	Votes	%
UNegA	Alfredo Marañon (incumbent)	528,895	59.65
NPC	Genaro Alvarez Jr.	357,809	40.35
Total votes		886,704	100.00

=== Central Visayas ===
==== Bohol ====
Incumbent governor Edgardo Chatto is running for reelection.

Bohol gubernatorial election
Party	Candidate	Votes	%
Liberal	Edgardo Chatto (incumbent)	380,964	68.53
UNA	Conchita Torribio-delos Reyes	164,904	29.66
Independent	Wenceslao Garcia	6,919	1.24
Independent	Roberto "Amay Bisaya" Reyes	3,102	0.56
Total votes		555,889	100.00
Liberal hold			

==== Cebu ====
Incumbent governor Gwendolyn Garcia is term-limited and running for Congress instead. Her brother Congressman Pablo John Garcia is her party and the National Unity Party's nominee.

Cebu (Note: Incumbent governor Gwendolyn Garcia is term-limited and is running for congresswoman. His brother, incumbent congressman Pablo John Garcia is running in her place) gubernatorial election
Party	Candidate	Votes	%
Liberal	Hilario Davide III	654,054	55.52
NUP	Pablo John Garcia	490,148	41.61
Independent	Roliveth Cortes	25,735	2.18
Independent	Hermelito Bulala	8,105	0.69
Total votes		1,178,042	100.00
Liberal gain from UNA			

==== Negros Oriental ====
Roel Degamo is the incumbent after the death of the former governor, the late Agustin Perdices, He will face incumbent Congresswoman Jocelyn Sy-Limkaichong and former finance secretary Margarito Teves.

Negros Oriental gubernatorial election
Party	Candidate	Votes	%
PDP–Laban	Roel Degamo (incumbent)	212,687	40.55
Liberal	Jocelyn Sy-Limkaichong	161,849	30.85
NPC	Margarito Teves	148,887	28.38
Independent	Samuel Torres	1,142	0.22
Total votes		524,565	100.00
PDP–Laban hold			

==== Siquijor ====
Incumbent governor Orlando Fua, Jr. running for congressman instead; his brother Orville Fua is his party's nominee.

Siquijor (Note: Incumbent governor Orlando Fua, Jr. is running for congressman. His brother, Orville Fua is running in his place) gubernatorial election
Party	Candidate	Votes	%
Liberal	Zaldy Villa	30,143	56.17
Lakas	Orville Fua	23,519	43.83
Total votes		53,662	100.00
Liberal gain from Lakas			

=== Eastern Visayas ===
==== Biliran ====
Incumbent Gerardo Espina Jr. is running for reelection.

Biliran gubernatorial election
Party	Candidate	Votes	%
Liberal	Gerardo Espina Jr. (incumbent)	47,066	63.75
PMP	Niceto Limpiado	25,095	33.99
Independent	Edgardo Ambe	1,499	2.03
Independent	Luis Sumaya	165	0.22
Total votes		73,825	100.00
Liberal hold			

==== Eastern Samar ====
Incumbent governor Conrado Nicart, Jr. is running for reelection.

Eastern Samar gubernatorial election
Party	Candidate	Votes	%
Liberal	Conrado Nicart Jr. (incumbent)	109,095	53.48
NUP	Javier Zacarte	93,450	45.81
Independent	Alfredo Hobayan	1,460	0.72
Total votes		204,005	100.00
Liberal hold			

==== Leyte ====
Incumbent governor Jericho Petilla was appointed Secretary of Energy, Vice Gov. Mimiet Bagulaya assumed as acting governor and is running as board member; Leopoldo Dominico Petilla is her party's nominee.

Leyte (Note: Mimieta Bagulaya assumed as acting governor when incumbent governor Jericho Petilla was appointed as Energy Secretary and is not running. His brother, Leopoldo Dominico Petilla is running in his place.) gubernatorial election
Party	Candidate	Votes	%
Liberal	Leopoldo Dominico Petilla	394,243	100.00
Total votes		394,243	100.00
Liberal hold			

==== Northern Samar ====
Incumbent governor Paul Daza is running for reelection.

Northern Samar gubernatorial election
Party	Candidate	Votes	%
NUP	Jose Ong, Jr.	153,613	57.17
Liberal	Paul Daza (incumbent)	115,077	42.83
Total votes		268,690	100.00
NUP gain from Liberal			

==== Samar ====
Incumbent governor Sharee Ann Tan is running for reelection.

Samar gubernatorial election
Party	Candidate	Votes	%
NPC	Sharee Ann Tan (incumbent)	169,504	50.74
Liberal	Rosa Jessica Delgado	161,831	48.44
KBL	Antonio San Buenaventura, Jr.	2,718	0.81
Total votes		334,053	100.00
NPC hold			

==== Southern Leyte ====
Incumbent governor Damian Mercado chose to run for Congressman instead; incumbent Congressman Roger Mercado is his party's nominee.

Southern Leyte (Note: Incumbent governor Damian Mercado is running for congressman. His brother, incumbent congressman Roger Mercado is running in his place) gubernatorial election
Party	Candidate	Votes	%
NUP	Roger Mercado	109,237	59.70
Liberal	Robert Castañares	73,736	40.30
Total votes		182,973	100.00
NUP hold			

== Mindanao ==
=== Zamboanga Peninsula ===
==== Zamboanga del Norte ====
Incumbent governor Rolando Yebes is term-limited, he is running for congressman instead; his party didn't have any nominee, but nominated his ally, Cesar Jalosjos, to run for governor.

Zamboanga del Norte (Note: Incumbent governor Rolando Yebes is term limited and is running for congressman) gubernatorial election
Party	Candidate	Votes	%
Liberal	Roberto Uy	247,373	58.64
Nacionalista	Cesar Jalosjos	174,475	41.36
Total votes		421,848	100.00
Liberal gain from Nacionalista			

==== Zamboanga del Sur ====
Incumbent governor Antonio Cerilles is running for reelection. On January 15, 2013, the Commission on Elections disqualified Dominador Jalosjos, Jr. (Nacionalista) who was to run for governor and his brother, Romeo Jalosjos who is a candidate for mayor of Zamboanga City for violating the Local Government Code of 1991 which bars ex-convicts to run for office and run short of the required one-year residency in the place where a candidate can run. Thereby, Cerilles is running for reelection unopposed.

Zamboanga del Sur gubernatorial election
Party	Candidate	Votes	%
NPC	Antonio Cerilles (incumbent)	257,605	100.00
Total votes		257,605	100.00
NPC hold			

==== Zamboanga Sibugay ====
Incumbent governor Rommel Jalosjos is running for reelection.

Zamboanga Sibugay gubernatorial election
Party	Candidate	Votes	%
Liberal	Wilter Palma	118,575	51.07
Nacionalista	Rommel Jalosjos (incumbent)	113,616	48.93
Total votes		232,191	100.00
Liberal gain from Nacionalista			

=== Northern Mindanao ===
==== Bukidnon ====
Incumbent governor Alex Calingasan is not running for reelection. He is running for Vice Governor instead; Vice Governor Jose Maria Zubiri, Jr. is his party's nominee.

Bukidnon (Note: Incumbent governor Alex Calingasan is running for vice governor) gubernatorial election
Party	Candidate	Votes	%
BPP	Jose Maria Zubiri Jr.	386,776	84.99
Independent	Lynard Allan Bigcas	61,713	13.56
Independent	Delfina Bicatulo	3,743	0.82
Independent	Romeo Zuce	2,859	0.63
Total votes		455,091	100.00
BPP hold			

==== Camiguin ====
Incumbent governor Jurdin Jesus Romualdo is running for reelection.

Camiguin gubernatorial election
Party	Candidate	Votes	%
NPC	Jurdin Jesus Romualdo (incumbent)	33,008	72.79
Liberal	Rita Gallardo	12,341	27.21
Total votes		45,349	100.00
NPC hold			

==== Lanao del Norte ====
Incumbent governor Mohamad Khalid Dimaporo is running for reelection.

Lanao del Norte gubernatorial election
Party	Candidate	Votes	%
NPC	Mohamad Khalid Dimaporo (incumbent)	137,475	59.91
Liberal	Casan Maquiling	87,118	37.97
Independent	Diego Palomares	4,488	1.96
Independent	Michael Siangco	381	0.17
Total votes		229,462	100.00
NPC hold			

==== Misamis Occidental ====
Incumbent governor Herminia Ramiro is running for reelection.

Misamis Occidental gubernatorial election
Party	Candidate	Votes	%
NUP	Herminia Ramiro (incumbent)	209,906	91.86
Independent	Pacita Yap	18,597	8.14
Total votes		228,503	100.00
NUP hold			

==== Misamis Oriental ====
Incumbent governor Oscar Moreno is term-limited and will instead run for Mayor of Cagayan de Oro; Vice Governor Norris Babiera is his party's nominee. He will face Congressman Yevgeny Emano.

Misamis Oriental (Note: Incumbent governor Oscar Moreno is term limited and is running for Mayor of Cagayan de Oro.) gubernatorial election
Party	Candidate	Votes	%
Nacionalista	Yevgeny Emano	190,986	52.86
Liberal	Norris Babiera	170,321	47.14
Total votes		361,307	100.00
Nacionalista gain from Liberal			

=== Davao Region ===
==== Compostela Valley ====
Incumbent governor Arturo Uy is running for reelection unopposed.

Compostela Valley gubernatorial election
Party	Candidate	Votes	%
Liberal	Arturo Uy (incumbent)	188,598	100.00
Total votes		188,598	100.00
Liberal hold			

==== Davao del Norte ====
Incumbent governor Rodolfo del Rosario is running for reelection. Candidate Norberto Mijanes was disqualified by Comelec. As a result, Governor del Rosario was running unopposed.

Davao del Norte gubernatorial election
Party	Candidate	Votes	%
Liberal	Rodolfo del Rosario (incumbent)	308,645	100.00
Total votes		308,645	100.00
Liberal hold			

==== Davao del Sur ====
Incumbent governor Douglas Cagas is not running for reelection. He is instead running for Mayor of Digos City; Congressman Marc Douglas Cagas IV is his party's nominee.

Davao del Sur (Note: Incumbent governor Douglas Cagas is running for Mayor of Digos City. His son, incumbent congressman Marc Douglas Cagas IV is running in his place.) gubernatorial election
Party	Candidate	Votes	%
Liberal	Claude Bautista	215,927	57.20
Nacionalista	Marc Douglas Cagas IV	161,590	42.80
Total votes		377,517	100.00
Liberal gain from Nacionalista			

==== Davao Oriental ====
Incumbent governor Corazon Malanyaon is running for reelection unopposed.

Davao Oriental gubernatorial election
Party	Candidate	Votes	%
Nacionalista	Corazon Malanyaon (incumbent)	149,297	100.00
Total votes		149,297	100.00
Nacionalista hold			

==== Davao del Norte ====
Incumbent governor Rodolfo Del Rosario is running for reelection. Candidate Norberto Mijanes was disqualified by Comelec, as a result Governor Del Rosario was running unopposed.

Davao del Norte gubernatorial election
Party	Candidate	Votes	%
Liberal	Rodolfo del Rosario (incumbent)	229,960	100.00
Total votes		283,152	100.00
Liberal hold			

==== Davao del Sur ====
Incumbent governor Douglas Cagas is not running for reelection. He is instead running for Mayor of Digos City; Congressman Marc Douglas Cagas IV is his party's nominee.

Davao del Sur gubernatorial election
Party	Candidate	Votes	%
Liberal	Claude Bautista	126,516	57.15
Nacionalista	Marc Douglas Cagas IV	94,852	42.85
Total votes		238,799	100.00
Liberal gain from Nacionalista			

==== Davao Oriental ====
Incumbent governor Corazon Malanyaon is running for reelection unopposed.

Davao Oriental gubernatorial election
Party	Candidate	Votes	%
Nacionalista	Corazon Malanyaon (incumbent)	99,865	100.00
Total votes		168,075	100.00
Nacionalista hold			

=== Soccsksargen ===
==== Cotabato ====
Incumbent governor Emmylou Taliño-Mendoza is running for reelection. Her main opponent is former governor Emmanuel Piñol.

Cotabato gubernatorial election
Party	Candidate	Votes	%
Liberal	Emmylou Taliño-Mendoza (incumbent)	242,839	54.69
NPC	Emmanuel Piñol	198,965	44.81
Independent	Kamarozaman Rajahmuda	2,196	0.49
Total votes		444,000	100.00
Liberal hold			

==== Sarangani ====
Incumbent governor Miguel Rene Dominguez is term-limited.

Sarangani (Note: Incumbent governor Miguel Rene Dominguez term-limited) gubernatorial election
Party	Candidate	Votes	%
PCM	Steve Solon	133,175	100.00
Total votes		133,175	100.00
PCM gain from SARRO			

==== South Cotabato ====
Incumbent governor Arthur Pingoy Jr. is running for reelection. His main opponent is incumbent congresswoman Daisy Avance-Fuentes.

South Cotabato gubernatorial election
Party	Candidate	Votes	%
NPC	Daisy Avance-Fuentes	117,855	35.91
UNA	Arthur Pingoy, Jr. (incumbent)	111,214	33.89
Lakas	Fernando Miguel	99,103	30.20
Total votes		328,172	100.00
NPC gain from UNA			

==== Sultan Kudarat ====
Incumbent governor Suharto Mangudadatu is running for reelection as an independent candidate.

Sultan Kudarat gubernatorial election
Party	Candidate	Votes	%
Independent	Suharto Mangudadatu (incumbent)	139,809	55.48
Liberal	Lino Montilla	111,114	44.09
Independent	Ephraim Delfino	1,066	0.42
Total votes		251,989	100.00
Independent hold			

=== Caraga Region ===
==== Agusan del Norte ====
Incumbent governor Erlpe John Amante is term-limited and will instead run for Congress; His sister, Representative Angelica Amante-Matba is his party's nominee. Candidate Jorge Lomongsod was disqualified by Comelec. As a result, Amante-Matba was running unopposed.

Agusan del Norte (Note: Incumbent governor Erlpe John Amante is term limited and is running for congressman. His sister, incumbent congresswoman Angelica Amante-Matba is running in his place) gubernatorial election
Party	Candidate	Votes	%
Liberal	Angelica Amante-Matba	106,626	100.00
Total votes		106,626	100.00
Liberal hold			

==== Agusan del Sur ====
Incumbent governor Eddiebong Plaza is running for reelection.

Agusan del Sur gubernatorial election
Party	Candidate	Votes	%
NUP	Eddiebong Plaza (incumbent)	153,042	64.81
Liberal	Isoceles Otero	80,687	34.17
Independent	Ben Cebuala	2,418	1.02
Total votes		236,147	100.00
NUP hold			

==== Dinagat Islands ====
Incumbent governor Glenda Ecleo is running for reelection. Her opponent is her daughter, incumbent vice governor Jade Ecleo.

Dinagat Islands gubernatorial election
Party	Candidate	Votes	%
Nacionalista	Glenda Ecleo (incumbent)	23,385	50.68
Liberal	Jade Ecleo	22,760	49.32
Total votes		46,145	100.00
Nacionalista hold			

==== Surigao del Norte ====
Incumbent governor Sol Matugas is running for reelection. Her primary opponent is former governor Robert Lyndon Barbers.

Surigao del Norte gubernatorial election
Party	Candidate	Votes	%
Liberal	Sol Matugas (incumbent)	145,681	66.18
Nacionalista	Robert Lyndon Barbers	72,603	32.98
Independent	Nestor Madelo	1,539	0.70
Independent	Vitaliano Ugalde Jr.	300	0.14
Total votes		220,123	100.00
Liberal hold			

==== Surigao del Sur ====
Incumbent governor Johnny Pimentel is running for reelection.

Surigao del Sur gubernatorial election
Party	Candidate	Votes	%
Liberal	Johnny Pimentel (incumbent)	197,688	92.75
Independent	Anecito Murillo	15,461	7.25
Total votes		213,149	100.00
Liberal hold			

=== Autonomous Region in Muslim Mindanao ===
==== Basilan ====
Incumbent governor Jum Akbar is running for reelection.

Basilan gubernatorial election
Party	Candidate	Votes	%
Liberal	Jum Akbar (incumbent)	102,181	70.82
Lakas	Rabia Salapuddin	42,104	29.18
Total votes		144,285	100.00
Liberal hold			

==== Lanao del Sur ====
Incumbent governor Mamintal Adiong Jr. is running for reelection.

Lanao del Sur gubernatorial election
Party	Candidate	Votes	%
Liberal	Mamintal Adiong Jr. (incumbent)	186,879	67.69
PDP–Laban	Omar Ali	78,824	28.55
NPC	Amer Pangandaman	5,371	1.95
Independent	Ahmadjan Abdulcarim	3,213	1.16
Independent	Arab Aguam	1,811	0.66
Total votes		276,098	100.00
Liberal hold			

==== Maguindanao ====
Incumbent governor Esmael Mangudadatu is running for reelection.

Maguindanao gubernatorial election
Party	Candidate	Votes	%
Liberal	Esmael Mangudadatu (incumbent)	195,473	67.37
PDP–Laban	Tucao Mastura	94,678	32.63
Total votes		290,151	100.00
Liberal hold			

==== Sulu ====
Incumbent governor Abdusakur Mahail Tan is not running for reelection. His son, Abdusakur Tan II is running in his place.

Sulu (Note: Incumbent governor Abdusakur Tan is not running. His son, Abdusakur Tan II is running in his place) gubernatorial election
Party	Candidate	Votes	%
Liberal	Abdusakur Tan II	164,013	85.24
PDP–Laban	Abdulwahid Sahidula	27,423	14.25
KBL	Kadra Masihul	983	0.51
Total votes		192,419	100.00
Liberal hold			

==== Tawi-Tawi ====
Incumbent governor Sadikul Sahali is term limited. His son, Nurbert Sahali is his party's nominee.

Tawi-Tawi (Note: Incumbent governor Sadikul Sahali is term limited. His son, Nurbert Sahali is running in his place.) gubernatorial election
Party	Candidate	Votes	%
Liberal	Nurbert Sahali	47,922	55.47
UNA	Rashidin Matba	26,170	30.29
NPC	Nur Jaafar	12,303	14.24
Total votes		86,395	100.00
Liberal hold			
