= 2022 Philippine gubernatorial elections =

- May 9, 2022

All 81 provincial governorships
	First party	Second party	Third party
Party	PDP–Laban	Nacionalista	NPC
Last election	41	8	7
Seats before	33	9	9
Seats after	24	13	12
Seat change	▼9	▲4	▲3
	Fourth party	Fifth party	Sixth party
Party	NUP	Lakas	PDDS
Last election	8	2	0
Seats before	7	5	2
Seats after	8	7	3
Seat change	▲1	▲2	▲1
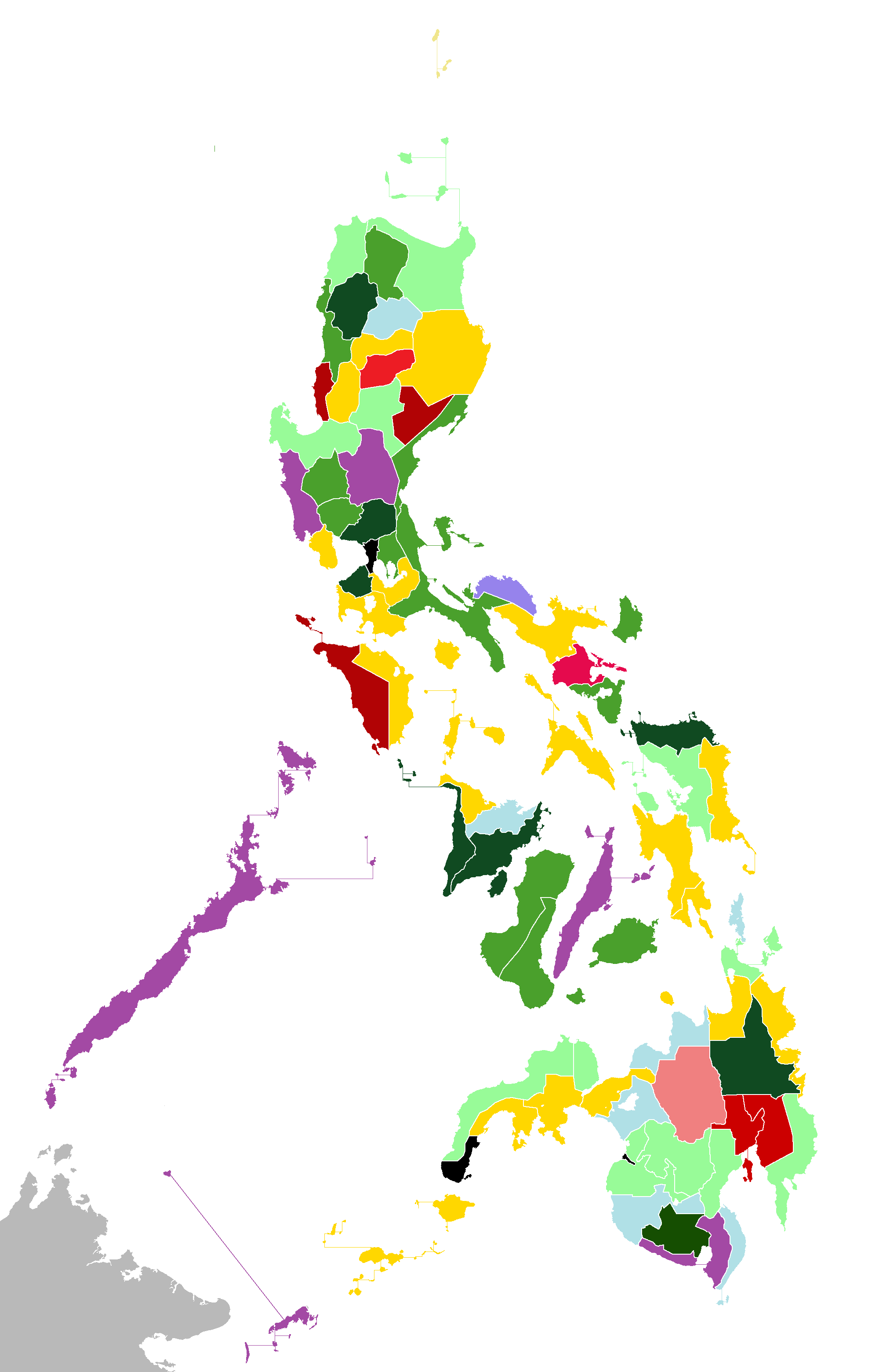
President of the League of Provinces of the Philippines before election
Presbitero Velasco (Marinduque)
PDP–Laban
Elected President of the League of Provinces of the Philippines
Reynaldo Tamayo Jr. (South Cotabato)
PFP

Gubernatorial elections were held in the Philippines on May 9, 2022. All provinces will elect their provincial governors for three-year terms, who will be inaugurated on June 30, 2022 after their proclamation. Governors that are currently serving their third consecutive terms are prohibited from running as governors (they may run for any other posts however).

Highly urbanized cities and independent component cities such as Baguio, Cebu City and Davao City and Metro Manila with the municipality of Pateros are outside the jurisdiction of any province and thus do not run elections for governors of their mother provinces (Benguet, Cebu and Davao del Sur respectively). These cities and Pateros elect mayors instead.

== Summary ==
Party	2019 elections	Before elections	Won	%	Change (vs. before)
PDP–Laban	41	33	24	29.6%	▼9
Nacionalista	8	9	13	16.1%	▲4
NPC	7	9	12	14.8%	▲3
NUP	8	7	8	9.9%	▲1
Lakas	2	5	7	8.6%	▲2
PDDS	—N/a	2	3	3.7%	▲1
Reporma	0	1	2	2.5%	▲1
Liberal	2	2	1	1.2%	▼1
KBL	0	1	1	1.2%	Steady
PFP	0	1	1	1.2%	Steady
Aksyon	—N/a	0	1	1.2%	▲1
PRP	—N/a	0	1	1.2%	▲1
KANP	—N/a	0	1	1.2%	▲1
UNA	1	0	0	0.0%	Steady
LDP	0	1	0	0.0%	▼1
Local parties	9	10	6	7.4%	▼4
Independent	3	0	0	0.0%	Steady
Totals	81	81	81	100%	Steady

== Luzon ==
Incumbents are expressed in italics.

=== Ilocos Region ===
==== Ilocos Norte ====
Incumbent Governor Matthew Manotoc is running for reelection; his primary opponent is former congressman Rodolfo Fariñas.

Ilocos Norte gubernatorial election
Party	Candidate	Votes	%
Nacionalista	Matthew Manotoc	261,885	73.51%
Reporma	Rodolfo Fariñas	94,372	26.49%
Total votes		356,257	100.00%

==== Ilocos Sur ====
Incumbent Governor Ryan Luis Singson is term-limited, and will be running for Vice Governor. His wife, Patricia Savellano-Singson, was supposed to be running in his place, but withdrew her candidacy on October 11, leaving the governor's uncle and incumbent Vice Governor, Jerry Singson, running unopposed.

Ilocos Sur gubernatorial election
Party	Candidate	Votes	%
NPC	Jerry Singson	313,620	100%
Total votes		313,620	100.00%

==== La Union ====
Incumbent Governor Francisco Emmanuel Ortega III is supposed to run for reelection. On November 11, he withdrew from the race to run for mayor of San Fernando and was replaced by his daughter, Raphaelle Ortega-David.

La Union gubernatorial election
Party	Candidate	Votes	%
PDDS	Raphaelle Ortega-David	348,269	89.72%
Independent	Emmanuel Fonseca	39,907	10.28%
Total votes		388,176	100.00%

==== Pangasinan ====
Incumbent Governor Amado Espino III is running for reelection. He will be running against incumbent 5th District representative Ramon Guico III.

Pangasinan gubernatorial election
Party	Candidate	Votes	%
Nacionalista	Ramon Guico III	888,027	56.67%
PDP–Laban	Amado Espino III	669,441	42.72%
Independent	Rolly Jimenez	6,224	0.40%
PGRP	Caloy Padilla	3,251	0.21%
Total votes		1,566,943	100.00%

=== Cagayan Valley ===
==== Batanes ====
Incumbent Governor Marilou Cayco is running for reelection.

Batanes gubernatorial election
Party	Candidate	Votes	%
Liberal	Marilou Cayco	6,489	61.04%
NPC	Telesforo Castillejos	4,142	38.96%
Total votes		10,631	100.00%

==== Cagayan ====
Incumbent Governor Manuel Mamba is running for reelection. He will be running against Zarah Lara, the wife of incumbent 3rd District representative Joseph Lara.

Cagayan gubernatorial election
Party	Candidate	Votes	%
Nacionalista	Manuel Mamba	302,025	52.02%
PDP–Laban	Zarah Rose Lara	278,562	47.98%
Total votes		580,587	100.00%

==== Isabela ====
Incumbent Governor Rodolfo Albano III is running for reelection. He will be running against Gloria Almazan and Romeo Carlos.

Isabela gubernatorial election
Party	Candidate	Votes	%
PDP–Laban	Rodolfo Albano III	673,774	95.17%
Independent	Gloria Almazan	26,115	3.69%
PGRP	Romeo Carlos	8,101	1.14%
Total votes		707,990	100.00%

==== Nueva Vizcaya ====
Incumbent Governor Carlos Padilla is running for reelection against Incumbent Vice Governor Jose Tomas Jr.

Nueva Vizcaya gubernatorial election
Party	Candidate	Votes	%
Nacionalista	Carlos Padilla	143,552	59.48%
PRP	Jose Tomas Jr.	97,774	40.52%
Total votes		241,326	100.00%

==== Quirino ====
Incumbent Governor Dakila Cua is running for reelection against former Nagtipunan Mayor Rosario Camma.

Quirino gubernatorial election
Party	Candidate	Votes	%
PDDS	Dakila Cua	82,377	81.65%
Aksyon	Rosario Camma	18,512	18.35%
Total votes		100,889	100.00%

=== Cordillera Administrative Region ===
==== Abra ====
Incumbent Governor Maria Jocelyn Bernos will be running for Vice Governor. Her party nominated her father, incumbent Bangued, Abra Mayor Dominic Valera. His main opponents will be Derdrei Roce Luna-Ifurung, daughter of former Congresswoman Cecilia Seares-Luna and former Governor Eustaquio Bersamin.

Abra gubernatorial election
Party	Candidate	Votes	%
NUP	Dominic Valera	74,337	51.1%
Reporma	Eustaquio Bersamin	63,537	43.68%
Aksyon	Derdrei Roce Luna-Ifurung	6,210	4.27%
Independent	Xander Alexander Cariño	1,383	0.95%
Total votes		145,467	100.00%

==== Apayao ====
Congressman Elias Bulut Jr. is aiming to switch places with his sister Governor Eleonor Bulut Begtang.

Apayao gubernatorial election
Party	Candidate	Votes	%
NPC	Elias Bulut Jr.	49,851	100%
Total votes		49,851	100.00%

==== Benguet ====
Incumbent Governor Melchor Diclas is running for reelection.

Benguet gubernatorial election
Party	Candidate	Votes	%
PDP–Laban	Melchor Diclas	112,345	57.62%
PFP	Robert Namoro	64,187	32.92%
KBL	Jerry Marave	15,352	7.87%
Independent	Jerome Wakat	2,274	1.17%
Katipunan	Alexander Tadina	828	0.42%
Total votes		194,986	100.00%

==== Ifugao ====
Incumbent Governor Jerry Dalipog is running for reelection.

Ifugao gubernatorial election
Party	Candidate	Votes	%
KBL	Jerry Dalipog	80,127	79.90%
Aksyon	Julio Tindungan	17,112	17.06%
Independent	Thomas Tundagui Jr.	3,047	3.04%
Total votes		100,286	100.00%

==== Kalinga ====
Incumbent Governor Ferdinand Tubban is running for reelection against former Vice Governor James Edduba. Tubban defeated Edduba by ten votes in 2019.

Kalinga gubernatorial election
Party	Candidate	Votes	%
Lakas	James Edduba	60,070	46.57%
PDP–Laban	Ferdinand Tubban	56,019	43.43%
PFP	Conrado Dieza Jr.	12,899	9.99%
Total votes		128,988	100.00%

==== Mountain Province ====
Incumbent Governor Bonifacio Lacwasan is running for reelection against Albert Paday-os.

Mountain Province gubernatorial election
Party	Candidate	Votes	%
PDP–Laban	Bonifacio Lacwasan	76,104	89.30%
Independent	Albert Paday-os	9,121	10.70%
Total votes		85,225	100.00%

=== Central Luzon ===
==== Aurora ====
Incumbent Governor Edgardo Noveras is term-limited. He is running for Vice Governor swapping together with his son Incumbent Vice Governor Christian Noveras running against former board member Isidro Galban for province's governorship.

Aurora gubernatorial election
Party	Candidate	Votes	%
PDP–Laban	Christian Noveras	76,220	62.78%
LDP	Isidro Galban	45,187	37.22%
Total votes		121,407	100.00%

==== Bataan ====
Incumbent Governor Albert Garcia is term-limited and will instead be running for 2nd District Representative. His brother, 2nd District representative Joet Garcia will be running in his stead and is unopposed.

Bataan gubernatorial election
Party	Candidate	Votes	%
PDP–Laban	Joet Garcia	376,924	100%
Total votes		376,924	100.00%

==== Bulacan ====
Governor Daniel Fernando is going up against Vice Governor Wilhelmino Sy-Alvarado.

Bulacan gubernatorial election
Party	Candidate	Votes	%
NUP	Daniel Fernando	987,160	61.00%
PDP–Laban	Wilhelmino Sy-Alvarado	586,650	36.25%
Independent	Pancho Valerio	23,228	1.44%
Independent	Datu Adam Ocampo	10,958	0.68%
Independent	Ernesto Balite	10,391	0.64%
Total votes		1,618,387	100.00%

==== Nueva Ecija ====
Incumbent Governor Aurelio Umali is running for reelection against Palayan Mayor Adrianne Mae Cuevas.

Nueva Ecija gubernatorial election
Party	Candidate	Votes	%
Sigaw	Aurelio Umali	826,876	69.21%
PDP–Laban	Adrianne Mae Cuevas	367,816	30.79%
Total votes		1,194,692	100.00

==== Pampanga ====
Incumbent Dennis Pineda is going up against Danilo Baylon, the former mayor of Candaba who is said to have received an order from God for him to run.

Pampanga gubernatorial election
Party	Candidate	Votes	%
NPC	Dennis Pineda	668,787	58.95%
Liberal	Danilo Baylon	465,704	41.05%
Total votes		1,134,491	100.00%

==== Tarlac ====
Tarlac gubernatorial election
Party	Candidate	Votes	%
NPC	Susan Yap	600,355	100%
Total votes		600,355	100.00%

==== Zambales ====
Governor Hermogenes Ebdane is seeking a second consecutive term. His main opponent is 2nd District Representative Atty. Cheryl P. Deloso-Montalla.

Zambales gubernatorial election
Party	Candidate	Votes	%
SZP	Hermogenes Ebdane	199,874	59.69%
NPC	Cheryl Deloso-Montalla	133,479	39.86%
PDDS	Milinia Nuezca	1,502	0.45%
Total votes		334,855	100.00%

=== Calabarzon ===
==== Batangas ====
Incumbent Hermilando Mandanas is running for his third and final term. His opponents are Praxedes Bustamante and former Padre Garcia mayor Prudencio Gutierrez.

On April 22, gubernatorial aspirant and former vice governor Richard Recto withdrew his candidacy.

Batangas gubernatorial election
Party	Candidate	Votes	%
PDP–Laban	Hermilando Mandanas	928,322	65.93%
NPC	Prudencio Gutierrez	391,868	27.83%
Independent	Richard Recto (candidacy withdrawn)	72,430	5.14%
Independent	Praxedes Bustamante	15,414	1.09%
Total votes		1,408,034	100%

==== Cavite ====
Governor Jonvic Remulla is seeking his second consecutive term.

Remulla was re-elected; his running-mate, Athena Tolentino, was elected vice governor.

Cavite gubernatorial election
Party	Candidate	Votes	%
NUP	Jonvic Remulla	1,368,199	84.67%
Independent	Weng Aguinaldo	122,590	7.59%
Independent	Augusto Pera, Jr.	98,848	6.12%
Independent	Jerum Gilles	26,228	1.62%
Total votes		1,615,865	100%

==== Laguna ====
Governor Ramil Hernandez is going up against outgoing congresswoman Sol Aragones.

Laguna gubernatorial election
Party	Candidate	Votes	%
PDP–Laban	Ramil Hernandez	872,378	57.60%
Nacionalista	Sol Aragones	630,232	41.61%
Independent	Berlene Alberto	11,936	0.79%
Total votes		1,514,546	100%

==== Quezon ====
Governor Danilo Suarez is going up against outgoing congresswoman Angelina Tan.

Angelina Tan was elected, becoming the first woman governor of the province.

Quezon gubernatorial election
Party	Candidate	Votes	%
NPC	Angelina Tan	790,739	68.90%
Lakas	Danilo Suarez	320,395	27.92%
KBL	Angelita Tan	13,119	1.14%
Independent	Jeson Tan	8,523	0.74%
PRP	Sonny Suarez	7,287	0.63%
Independent	Romeo Suarez	4,162	0.36%
Independent	Warren Sio	3,532	0.31%
Total votes		1,147,667	100%

==== Rizal ====
Incumbent Governor Rebecca Ynares is term limited. Her husband, former governor Casimiro Ynares Jr. was supposed to run in her place, but later substituted by her daughter, GSIS Board of Trustee Nina Ricci Ynares on November 15.

Rizal gubernatorial election
Party	Candidate	Votes	%
NPC	Nina Ricci Ynares	952,019	85.52%
Independent	Andrew Sumulong	95,791	8.60%
Independent	Jose Velasco	28,734	2.58%
Independent	Benedict Angeles	25,042	2.25%
PGRP	Fernando Dizon	11,628	1.04%
Total votes		1,113,214	100%

=== Mimaropa ===
==== Marinduque ====
Incumbent Governor Presbitero Velasco will run for reelection. His opponents are Vice Governor Romulo Bacorro and national chairman emeritus of the League of Barangays in the Philippines James Marty Lim.

Marinduque gubernatorial election
Party	Candidate	Votes	%
PDP–Laban	Presbitero Velasco Jr.	63,115	48.08%
Aksyon	Romulo Bacorro	40,063	30.52%
ABC	James Marty Lim	28,086	21.4%
Total votes		131,264	100%

==== Occidental Mindoro ====
Incumbent Governor Eduardo Gadiano secured his post against incumbent Congresswoman Josephine Ramirez-Sato.

Occidental Mindoro gubernatorial election
Party	Candidate	Votes	%
PDDS	Eduardo Gadiano	150,627	61.59%
Liberal	Josephine Ramirez-Sato	92,138	37.68%
Independent	Adrian Bernardo Gatdula	1,781	0.73%
Total votes		244,546	100%

==== Oriental Mindoro ====
Governor Humerlito Dolor is going up against outgoing congressman Salvador Leachon.

Dolor was re-elected.

Oriental Mindoro gubernatorial election
Party	Candidate	Votes	%
PDP–Laban	Humerlito Dolor	255,696	58.25%
MBS	Paulino Salvador Leachon	182,201	41.51%
Independent	Jerry Casao	1,088	0.25%
Total votes		438,985	100%

==== Palawan ====
Jose Alvarez is term-limited and is running for congressman from Palawan's 2nd congressional district under PDP–Laban. That party is not running candidates for governor, but the local party he founded, Partidong Pagbabago ng Palawan, is fielding in former congressman & term-limited incumbent Vice Governor Victorino Dennis Socrates.

Palawan gubernatorial election
Party	Candidate	Votes	%
PPPL	Victorino Dennis Socrates	190,391	45.31%
Independent	Joel Reyes	147,919	35.20%
Independent	Frederick Abueg	64,732	15.41%
Independent	Art Ventura	9,795	2.33%
PPP	Agapito Salido Jr.	4,915	1.17%
Independent	Richard Lopez	2,445	0.58%
Total votes		420,197	100%

==== Romblon ====
Governor Jose Riano is going up against former congressman Eduardo Firmalo.

Romblon gubernatorial election
Party	Candidate	Votes	%
PDP–Laban	Jose Riano	94,513	59.25%
Liberal	Eduardo Firmalo	65,016	40.75%
Total votes		159,529	100%

=== Bicol Region ===
==== Albay ====
Governor Al Francis Bichara is going up against Legazpi mayor Noel Rosal.

Albay gubernatorial election
Party	Candidate	Votes	%
KANP	Noel Rosal	469,481	65.67%
Nacionalista	Al Francis Bichara	238,746	33.39%
Independent	Rodel Luna	4,421	0.62%
Independent	Mario Bacuil	2,282	0.32%
Total votes		714,930	100.00

==== Camarines Norte ====
Camarines Norte gubernatorial election
Party	Candidate	Votes	%
Aksyon	Ricarte Padilla	162,081	51.84%
PDP–Laban	Edgar Tallado	147,985	47.33%
Independent	Romeo Balmeo	1,417	0.45%
PPM	John Rom	1,199	0.38%
Total votes		312,682	100.00

==== Camarines Sur ====
Incumbent governor Miguel Luis Villafuerte is term-limited and is running for congressman. His younger brother Luigi (his party's nominee), congressman Rolando Andaya Jr. and vice governor Imelda Papin are the major candidates for the open seat.

Camarines Sur gubernatorial election
Party	Candidate	Votes	%
PDP–Laban	Vincenzo Luigi Villafuerte	492,415	52.92%
NPC	Rolando Andaya Jr.	416,434	44.75%
PFP	Imelda Papin	13,699	1.47%
Independent	Richard Cabal	4,208	0.45%
Independent	Ireneo Bongat, Jr.	3,744	0.40%
Total votes		930,500	100.00

==== Catanduanes ====
Catanduanes gubernatorial election
Party	Candidate	Votes	%
NPC	Joseph Cua	101,838	64.87%
Aksyon	Shirley Abundo	51,967	33.10%
Independent	Randy Tanael	3,192	2.03%
Total votes		156,997	100.00

==== Masbate ====
Masbate gubernatorial election
Party	Candidate	Votes	%
PDP–Laban	Antonio Kho	250,493	57.52%
NUP	Narciso Bravo Jr.	185,001	42.48%
Total votes		435,494	100.00

==== Sorsogon ====
Incumbent Francis Escudero is running for senator. His party nominated incumbent Casiguran mayor Jose Edwin Hamor for governor.

Sorsogon gubernatorial election
Party	Candidate	Votes	%
NPC	Jose Edwin Hamor	285,888	72.81%
NUP	Sally Ante Lee	101,848	25.94%
PPM	Noli Gimena	3,464	0.88%
Independent	Rodel Sentes	1,866	0.48%
Total votes		392,666	100.00

== Visayas ==
Incumbents are expressed in italics.

=== Western Visayas ===
==== Aklan ====
Governor Florencio Miraflores is term-limited and is retiring from politics. His son, Ibajay mayor Jose Enrique, is his party's candidate.

Aklan gubernatorial election
Party	Candidate	Votes	%
PDP–Laban	Jose Enrique Miraflores	196,897	63.09%
KBL	William Lachica	112,053	35.91%
Independent	Willie Tolentino	2,759	0.88%
Independent	Rayam Torres	992	0.32%
Total votes		312,071	100.00

==== Antique ====
Governor Rhodora Cadiao is eyeing reelection.

Antique gubernatorial election
Party	Candidate	Votes	%
NUP	Rhodora Cadiao	217,573	75.58%
PDP–Laban	Vicente Felidicio	66,207	23.00%
Independent	Mayong Petinglay	4,085	1.42%
Total votes		287,865	100.00

==== Capiz ====
Governor Esteban Evan Contreras is going up against congressman Fredenil Castro.

Capiz gubernatorial election
Party	Candidate	Votes	%
Lakas	Fredenil Castro	253,074	62.18%
PDP–Laban	Esteban Evan Contreras	151,218	37.16%
PFP	Elmer Villasis	2,695	0.66%
Total votes		406,987	100.00

==== Guimaras ====
Governor Samuel Gumarin is term-limited and is running for mayor of Buenavista. His party, PDP–Laban, did not name a nominee for the governorship. Meanwhile, former congressman Joaquin Carlos Nava is running as candidate of the National Unity Party.

Guimaras gubernatorial election
Party	Candidate	Votes	%
NUP	Joaquin Carlos Nava	92,570	96.60%
KBL	Jose Ramon Cacho	3,262	3.40%
Total votes		95,832	100.00

==== Iloilo ====
Governor Arthur Defensor Jr. is eyeing reelection.

Iloilo gubernatorial election
Party	Candidate	Votes	%
NUP	Arthur Defensor Jr.	891,980	97.18%
Independent	Nolbert Gil	25,919	2.82%
Total votes		917,899	100.00

==== Negros Occidental ====
Governor Eugenio Jose Lacson is eyeing reelection.

Negros Occidental gubernatorial election
Party	Candidate	Votes	%
NPC	Eugenio Jose Lacson	935,079	92.63%
PDDS	Juan Orola Jr.	57,845	5.73%
Independent	Maria Socorro Sibulan-Okada	16,579	1.64%
Total votes		1,009,503	100.00

=== Central Visayas ===
==== Bohol ====
Governor Arthur Yap is going up against congressman Erico Aristotle Aumentado after Leoncio Evasco Jr. declined to challenge Yap who had beaten him in 2019.

Bohol gubernatorial election
Party	Candidate	Votes	%
NPC	Erico Aristotle Aumentado	469,736	61.76%
PDP–Laban	Arthur Yap	283,903	37.33%
Independent	Hercules Castillo	4,220	0.55%
Independent	Concepcion Flores	2,693	0.35%
Total votes		760,552	100%

==== Cebu ====
Governor Gwendolyn Garcia is going up against former Tourism Secretary Ace Durano.

Cebu gubernatorial election
Party	Candidate	Votes	%
1CEBU	Gwendolyn Garcia	1,478,436	80.80%
PPP	Ace Durano	341,455	18.66%
Independent	Nonito Magnanao	9,812	0.54%
Total votes		1,829,703	100%

==== Negros Oriental ====
Governor Roel Degamo is going up against vice governor Edward Mark Macias and Bayawan mayor Pryde Henry Teves. Degamo was allowed by the COMELEC to seek re-election despite completing three consecutive terms. On his defense, Degamo claimed that his three terms in office were interrupted a number of times following suspension and dismissal orders by the Office of the Ombudsman over cases of intelligence and calamity fund use filed against him.

On December 16, 2021, the Commission on Elections (Second Division), through a resolution, declared Grego Gaudia as a nuisance candidate and cancelled his candidacy, citing that he used the name "Ruel Degamo", which later appeared in the ballots, to confuse the voters. He later filed a motion for reconsideration, allowing him to run; but it was denied by the COMELEC en banc on September 1, 2022. With the commission finalizing its decision on Gaudia and crediting his votes to Degamo, on October 3, Degamo was proclaimed as the elected candidate.

Negros Oriental gubernatorial election
Party	Candidate	Votes	%
NPC	Pryde Henry Teves (Note: Victory later invalidated.)	301,319	44.41%
Nacionalista	Roel Degamo (Note: Votes obtained by Ruel Degamo credited to him; proclaimed winner, Oct. 2022.)	281,773	41.53%
Independent	Ruel Degamo (Note: Candidacy invalidated; votes obtained later credited to Roel Degamo.)	49,953	7.36%
Liberal	Edward Mark Macias	45,454	6.70%
Total votes		678,499	100%

==== Siquijor ====
Governor Zaldy Villa is term-limited and is running for congressman. His local party Partidong Siquijor nominated his son, congressman Jake Vincent Villa. His opponent is Larena mayor Dean Villa.

Siquijor gubernatorial election
Party	Candidate	Votes	%
NPC	Jake Vincent Villa	32,615	50.96%
Aksyon	Dean Villa	31,388	49.04%
Total votes		64,003	100%

=== Eastern Visayas ===
==== Biliran ====
Governor Rogelio Espina originally filed his candidacy to defend the governorship. However, he withdrew and was replaced by his son, Naval mayor Gerard Espina.

Biliran gubernatorial election
Party	Candidate	Votes	%
Nacionalista	Gerard Espina	73,565	89.21%
PROMDI	Edgardo Ambe	8,900	10.79%
Total votes		82,465	100.00

==== Eastern Samar ====
Governor Ben Evardone is eyeing reelection.

Eastern Samar gubernatorial election
Party	Candidate	Votes	%
PDP–Laban	Ben Evardone	211,554	88.52%
PFP	Petronilo Abuyen Jr.	21,444	8.97%
Independent	Alfredo Hobayan	6,001	2.51%
Total votes		238,999	100.00

==== Leyte ====
Governor Leopoldo Dominico Petilla is term-limited, having served three terms since 2013. His older brother, former governor and Energy Secretary Jericho Petilla, is running in his stead.

Leyte gubernatorial election
Party	Candidate	Votes	%
PDP–Laban	Jericho Petilla	547,109	82.23%
PRP	Avito Opiniano	94,670	14.23%
Independent	Romulo Gacgacao	23,528	3.54%
Total votes		665,307	100.00

==== Northern Samar ====
Northern Samar gubernatorial election
Party	Candidate	Votes	%
NUP	Edwin Marino Ongchuan	226,400	90.26%
Independent	Hildegardes Dineros	24,442	9.74%
Total votes		250,842	100.00

==== Samar ====
Incumbent Reynolds Michael Tan who assumed office after the death of former governor Milagrosa Tan is running for congressman. His sister, incumbent congresswoman Sharee Ann Tan is running in his place. Santa Margarita mayor Gemma Zosa is her opponent.

Samar gubernatorial election
Party	Candidate	Votes	%
Nacionalista	Sharee Ann Tan	293,557	62.27%
NUP	Gemma Zosa	173,457	36.79%
Independent	Ronald Paldez	2,847	0.60%
Independent	Billy Golden	1,600	0.34%
Total votes		471,461	100.00

==== Southern Leyte ====
Southern Leyte gubernatorial election
Party	Candidate	Votes	%
PDP–Laban	Damian Mercado	167,859	100%
Total votes		167,859	100.00

== Mindanao ==
Incumbents are expressed in italics.

=== Zamboanga Peninsula ===
==== Zamboanga del Norte ====
Governor Roberto Uy is term-limited and is running for mayor of Dapitan. His party, PDP–Laban, nominated his wife and former Dipolog mayor Evelyn Uy. Her primary opponent is Dapitan mayor Rosalina Jalosjos.

Zamboanga del Norte gubernatorial election
Party	Candidate	Votes	%
Nacionalista	Rosalina Jalosjos	256,885	49.94%
PDP–Laban	Evelyn Uy	246,785	47.98%
Independent	Eduardo Sumalpong	3,602	0.70%
Independent	Jun Cabigon	2,952	0.57%
PPM	Emmanuel Nueva	2,677	0.52%
Independent	Reynaldo Diputado	1,478	0.29%
Total votes		514,379	100.00

==== Zamboanga del Sur ====
Governor Victor Yu is eyeing for reelection. His primary opponents include former 2nd district congresswoman and 2019 gubernatorial challenger Aurora Enerio-Cerilles, and former Dumingag mayor Jun Pacalioga.

Zamboanga del Sur gubernatorial election
Party	Candidate	Votes	%
PDP–Laban	Victor Yu	291,227	55.41%
PRP	Jun Pacalioga	154,389	29.38%
Nacionalista	Aurora Enerio-Cerilles	69,234	13.17%
Aksyon	Shaira Yu-Gustaham	9,274	1.76%
Independent	Alex Delos Santos	1,148	0.22%
Total votes		525,572	100.00

==== Zamboanga Sibugay ====
Governor Wilter Palma is term-limited and is running for congressman from the 1st district. His son, 1st district congressman Wilter II was nominated by his party for the open position. His primary opponent is congresswoman from the 2nd district Dulce Ann Hofer.

Zamboanga Sibugay gubernatorial election
Party	Candidate	Votes	%
PDP–Laban	Dulce Ann Hofer	168,373	53.8%
Lakas	Wilter Palma II	143,539	45.86%
Independent	Jose Policarpio Jr.	763	0.24%
Independent	Peping Tu	309	0.10%
Total votes		312,984	100.00

=== Northern Mindanao ===
==== Bukidnon ====
Incumbent Governor Jose Maria Zubiri Jr. is term-limited, and will be running for Representative of 3rd District. His son, Manuel, will run in his place against 4th District Representative Rogelio Neil Roque.

Bukidnon gubernatorial election
Party	Candidate	Votes	%
PRP	Rogelio Neil Roque	371,222	49.94%
BPP	Manuel Zubiri	365,864	49.22%
WPP	Andrew Eligan	2,300	0.31%
Independent	Edgar Mabilog	1,962	0.26%
Independent	Rodrigo Tero	1,918	0.26%
Total votes		743,266	100.00

==== Camiguin ====
Governor Jurdin Jesus Romualdo is running for congressman. His party nominated his son term-limited congressman Xavier Jesus as their candidate.

Camiguin gubernatorial election
Party	Candidate	Votes	%
PDP–Laban	Xavier Jesus Romualdo	37,183	72.76%
PRP	Eduardo Chan	12,714	24.88%
PFP	Periolo Banaag	871	1.70%
PDDS	Pacundo Ebarle	335	0.66%
Total votes		51,103	100.00

==== Lanao del Norte ====
Governor Imelda Dimaporo is eyeing reelection.

Lanao del Norte gubernatorial election
Party	Candidate	Votes	%
PDP–Laban	Imelda Dimaporo	248,583	89.53%
PFP	Amer Moner Sr.	27,091	9.76%
Independent	Paisal Umpa	1,975	0.71%
Total votes		277,649	100.00

==== Misamis Occidental ====
Misamis Occidental gubernatorial election
Party	Candidate	Votes	%
Nacionalista	Henry Oaminal	242,083	71.27%
LDP	Philip Tan	96,024	28.27%
Independent	Bibiano Salvanera	1,577	0.46%
Total votes		339,684	100.00

==== Misamis Oriental ====
Governor Yevgeny Emano is term-limited. He is running for congressman from the 2nd district. His Padayon Pilipino local party did not name a candidate for governor but instead supported Gingoog vice mayor Peter Unabia as their gubernatorial candidate. Unabia's opponents for the position are Cagayan de Oro mayor and former governor Oscar Moreno and 2nd district congresswoman Juliette Uy.

Misamis Oriental gubernatorial election
Party	Candidate	Votes	%
Lakas	Peter Unabia	248,859	47.37%
NUP	Juliette Uy	182,130	34.66%
PROMDI	Oscar Moreno	89,404	17.02%
Independent	Cynthia Mary Magallanes	2,205	0.42%
Independent	Manuel Po	1,559	0.30%
Independent	Ellen Sabuero	1,249	0.24%
Total votes		525,406	100.00%

=== Davao Region ===
==== Davao de Oro ====
Governor Tyron Uy was the original candidate of the Hugpong ng Pagbabago, but withdrew in favor of his father, Davao de Oro Provincial Board member Arturo Uy and ran for vice governor instead. Arturo's primary opponent is former Panabo regional trial court judge Dorothy Gonzaga, wife of 2nd district congressman Ruwell Peter Gonzaga.

Davao de Oro gubernatorial election
Party	Candidate	Votes	%
Reporma	Dorothy Gonzaga	226,731	54.11%
Hugpong	Arturo Uy	190,552	45.47%
Independent	Alexander Dondiego	1,744	0.42%
Total votes		419,027	100.00

==== Davao del Norte ====
Governor Edwin Jubahib is going up against Davao del Norte Provincial Board member Roy Catalan.

Davao del Norte gubernatorial election
Party	Candidate	Votes	%
Reporma	Edwin Jubahib	310,947	60.61%
Hugpong	Roy Catalan	202,112	39.39%
Total votes		513,059	100.00

==== Davao del Sur ====
Governor Marc Douglas Cagas IV is not running; his party nominated his wife Yvonne as their nominee. She is going up against Kiblawan mayor Carl Jason Rama and Israelito Torreon, lawyer of Apollo Quiboloy.

Davao del Sur gubernatorial election
Party	Candidate	Votes	%
Nacionalista	Yvonne Roña Cagas	183,697	53.54%
Hugpong	Carl Jason Rama	126,138	36.76%
Independent	Israelito Torreon	31,183	9.09%
Independent	Rosemarie Villamor	1,223	0.36%
Independent	Dolson Adlog	862	0.25%
Total votes		343,103	100.00

==== Davao Occidental ====
Governor Claude Bautista is term limited and running for congressman. He nominated his elder brother Vice Governor Franklin Bautista who is running under Lakas party.

Bautista is running unopposed.

Davao Occidental gubernatorial election
Party	Candidate	Votes	%
Lakas	Franklin Bautista	102,421	100%
Total votes		102,421	100%

==== Davao Oriental ====
Governor Nelson Dayanghirang is running for congressman. His party nominated congresswoman Corazon Nuñez Malanyaon as their nominee.

Malanyaon is running unopposed.

Davao Oriental gubernatorial election
Party	Candidate	Votes	%
Nacionalista	Corazon Malanyaon	237,401	100%
Total votes		237,401	100%

=== Soccksargen ===
==== Cotabato ====
Governor Nancy Catamco is going up against vice governor Emmylou Taliño-Mendoza.

Cotabato gubernatorial election
Party	Candidate	Votes	%
Nacionalista	Emmylou Taliño-Mendoza	310,681	50.95%
PDP–Laban	Nancy Catamco	296,330	48.59%
Independent	Rex Maongko	1,618	0.27%
Independent	Manuel Adajar	1,195	0.20%
Total votes		609,824	100.00

==== Sarangani ====
Governor Steve Solon is term-limited and is vying for the congressional seat instead. His party nominated congressman Rogelio Pacquiao.

Sarangani gubernatorial election
Party	Candidate	Votes	%
PCM	Rogelio Pacquiao	166,249	73.42%
Aksyon	Mohamad Bong Aquia	52,634	23.24%
Independent	Gladden Lim	7,564	3.34%
Total votes		226,447	100.00

==== South Cotabato ====
Governor Reynaldo Tamayo Jr. is going up against congressman Ferdinand Hernandez.

South Cotabato gubernatorial election
Party	Candidate	Votes	%
PFP	Reynaldo Tamayo Jr.	253,944	52.32%
PDP–Laban	Ferdinand Hernandez	229,628	47.31%
Independent	Ramir Badayos	1,809	0.37%
Total votes		485,381	100.00

==== Sultan Kudarat ====
Incumbent Suharto Mangudadatu is not running. Incumbent Datu Abdullah Sangki, Maguindanao mayor Datu Pax Ali Mangudadatu is his party's nominee. His opponent is Miss Asia Pacific International 2018 Sharifa Akeel, wife of incumbent Maguindanao 2nd district representative Esmael Mangudadatu. Esmael and Suharto are cousins.

On January 18, the Commission on Elections (First Division) granted two petitions for the cancellation of the certificate of candidacy of Mangudadatu, citing "material misrepresentation". On May 2, COMELEC denied the motion for reconsideration filed by Mangudadatu, upholding the earlier decision. Akeel—Mangudadatu is supposed to be the only candidate for the position.

Despite the decision, the Supreme Court issued a temporary restraining order, allowing Mangudadatu to run. He would be elected as the issue remains unresolved.

Sultan Kudarat gubernatorial election
Party	Candidate	Votes	%
Lakas	Datu Pax Ali Mangudadatu (candidacy cancelled, but allowed to run through a TRO)	262,854	75.16%
Aksyon	Sharifa Akeel-Mangudadatu	86,868	24.84%
Total votes		349,722	100.00%

=== Caraga ===
==== Agusan del Norte ====
Governor Dale Corvera is running for congressman. His party nominated congresswoman Angelica Amante.

Agusan del Norte gubernatorial election
Party	Candidate	Votes	%
PDP–Laban	Angelica Amante	166,971	81.10%
Independent	Liza Aquino	36,896	17.92%
Independent	Cosme Dominise Jr.	2,004	0.97%
Total votes		205,871	100.00

==== Agusan del Sur ====
Governor Santiago Cane Jr. is running unopposed.

Agusan del Sur gubernatorial election
Party	Candidate	Votes	%
NUP	Santiago Cane Jr.	258,786	100%
Total votes		258,786	100%

==== Dinagat Islands ====
Governor Kaka Bag-ao is going up against vice governor Nilo Demerey Jr.

Dinagat Islands gubernatorial election
Party	Candidate	Votes	%
Lakas	Nilo Demerey Jr.	34,906	57.26%
Liberal	Kaka Bag-ao	26,055	42.76%
Total votes		60,961	100.00

==== Surigao del Norte ====
Governor Francisco Matugas is going up against former governor Lyndon Barbers and pastor Artemio Maquiso.

Surigao del Norte gubernatorial election
Party	Candidate	Votes	%
Nacionalista	Lyndon Barbers	165,373	52.59%
PDP–Laban	Francisco Matugas	147,291	46.84%
Independent	Artemio Maquiso	1,797	0.57%
Total votes		314,461	100.00

==== Surigao del Sur ====
Governor Alexander Pimentel is going up against Cantilan mayor Carla Pichay.

Surigao del Sur gubernatorial election
Party	Candidate	Votes	%
PDP–Laban	Alexander Pimentel	195,606	53.81%
Lakas	Carla Pichay	159,746	43.94%
PDSP	Juan Pimentel Jr.	8,194	2.25%
Total votes		363,546	100.00

=== Bangsamoro Autonomous Region in Muslim Mindanao ===
==== Basilan ====
Governor Hadjiman Hataman-Salliman is going up against former Basilan Provincial Board member Alfiya Akbar and retired policeman Ismael Garingan.

Basilan gubernatorial election
Party	Candidate	Votes	%
PDP–Laban	Hadjiman Hataman Salliman	121,457	59.03%
Lakas	Alfiya Akbar	83,056	40.37%
PDDS	Walid Amiril	630	0.31%
Independent	Ismael Garingan	617	0.30%
Total votes		205,760	100.00

==== Lanao del Sur ====
Governor Mamintal Alonto Adiong Jr. is going up against former special envoy for Muslim Affairs Ameroddin Sarangani.

Lanao del Sur gubernatorial election
Party	Candidate	Votes	%
Lakas	Mamintal Alonto Adiong Jr.	353,769	74.22%
RP	Gapor Usman	67,605	14.18%
Ummah Party	Ameroddin Sarangani	42,958	9.01%
Independent	Mansawi Mimbalawag	5,705	1.20%
Independent	Alim Ibrahim	2,200	0.46%
Independent	Camar Banocag, Jr.	1,386	0.29%
WPP	Jahlalodin Lucman	1,353	0.28%
Reporma	Ansary Maongco	659	0.14%
Independent	Haber Dida-agun	639	0.13%
PDDS	Hamza Molia	407	0.09%
Total votes		476,681	100.00

==== Maguindanao ====
Incumbent Governor Bai Mariam Sangki-Mangudadatu is going up against congressman Esmael Mangudadatu, who is her cousin-in-law.

Maguindanao gubernatorial election
Party	Candidate	Votes	%
Nacionalista	Bai Mariam Sangki-Mangudadatu	332,141	60.01%
UBJP	Esmael Mangudadatu	215,613	38.96%
PROMDI	Hadji Yasser Ampatuan	1,793	0.32%
Independent	Norsalyn Kasim	1,778	0.32%
Independent	Datu Mala Lumbos	1,763	0.32%
Aksyon	Dhats Ganasi	381	0.07%
Total votes		553,469	100.00

==== Sulu ====
Governor Abdusakur Tan is running unopposed.

Sulu gubernatorial election
Party	Candidate	Votes	%
PDP–Laban	Abdusakur Tan	346,273	100.00%
Total votes		346,273	100.00

==== Tawi-Tawi ====
Tawi-Tawi gubernatorial election
Party	Candidate	Votes	%
TOP	Yshmael Sali	106,225	58.31%
PDP–Laban	Sadikul Sahali	74,878	41.1%
Independent	Kennedy Tan	580	0.32%
Independent	Darwin Abdul	327	0.18%
PDP–Laban	Putli Zenaida Ibnohajil	168	0.09%
Total votes		182,178	100.00
