= League of Provinces of the Philippines =

Organization of provincial governors

- Liga ng mga Probinsya ng Pilipinas
- Headquarters: Unit 1510 West Tower Philippine Stock Exchange Center, Exchange Road, Ortigas Center, Pasig
- Members: 82
- National president: Reynaldo Tamayo Jr.
- Website: www.lpp.gov.ph

The League of Provinces of the Philippines (LPP), also referred to as the League of Provinces, is an organization composed of governors of the provinces in the Philippines. All of the 82 provinces are members of the organization.

== Statutory basis ==
Its creation and purpose is mandated by Section 502 of the Republic Act No. 7160, otherwise known as the Local Government Code of 1991, as amended, which states:

There shall be an organization of all provinces to be known as the League of Provinces for the primary purpose of ventilating, articulating and crystallizing issues affecting provincial and metropolitan political subdivision government administration, and securing, through proper and legal means, solutions thereto. For this purpose, the Metropolitan Manila Area and any metropolitan political subdivision shall be considered as separate provincial units of the league.

== Objectives ==
The league as the following objectives:

1. To foster unity and cooperation among all provinces of the country;
2. To provide a cohesive force that embodies the sentiments and aspirations of member provinces;
3. To serve as a forum of discussion and feedback mechanism on policies affecting local governments;
4. To collaborate with national and other local government agencies in attaining efficient and effective inter-governmental relations to provide development programs that will enrich and upgrade the capabilities of local government units;
5. To engage in continuing programs for the development of local government units;
6. To involve League officers and members in international associations, conventions, seminars and congresses.

== Representation ==
Each province is represented in the League by their governor. In case of his absence or incapacity, the vice governor or a sanggunian member of the province shall be its representative after being elected for this purpose by its members.

== Powers, functions and duties ==
Section 504 of the Local Government Code of 1991 outlines the following powers, functions and duties of the League:

- Assist the national government in the formulation and implementation of the policies, programs and projects affecting provinces as a whole
- Promote local autonomy at the provincial level
- Adopt measures for the promotion of the welfare of all provinces and its officials and employees
- Encourage people's participation in local government administration in order to promote united and concerted action for the attainment of countrywide development goals;
- Supplement the efforts of the national government in creating opportunities for gainful employment within the province
- Give priority to programs designed for the total development of the provinces in consonance with the policies, programs and projects of the national government
- Serve as a forum for crystallizing and expressing ideas, seeking the necessary assistance of the national government and providing the private sector avenues for cooperation in the promotion of the welfare of the provinces
- Exercise such other powers and perform such other duties and functions as the league may prescribe for the welfare of the provinces and metropolitan political subdivisions.

== Funding ==
The league is funded by contributions of its member local government units and/or by any fund raising activity that they organize. These funds shall be deposited to the treasurer as trust funds and is subjected to pertinent accounting and auditing rules.

== Leaders ==
The league is headed by the president, who leads the league and presides over its national assembly, and the chairman, who presides over its national executive board.

These are the past leaders of the league:

Year	President			Chairman		
Year	Name	Province	Party	Name	Province	Party
1988	Luis Villafuerte	Camarines Sur	UNIDO			
1990	Roberto Pagdanganan	Bulacan	Lakas	Lito Osmeña	Cebu	Lakas
1992	Roberto Pagdanganan	Bulacan	Lakas	Isagani Amatong	Zamboanga del Norte	Liberal
1995	Roberto Pagdanganan	Bulacan	Lakas	Prospero Amatong	Davao del Norte	Lakas
1998	Joey Lina	Laguna	LDP	Luis Villafuerte	Camarines Sur	LDP
2001	Rodolfo del Rosario	Davao del Norte	Lakas	Luis Villafuerte	Camarines Sur	LDP
2004	Erico Aumentado	Bohol	Lakas	Chavit Singson	Ilocos Sur	Lakas
2007	Loreto Ocampos	Misamis Occidental	Lakas	Luis Raymond Villafuerte	Camarines Sur	Lakas
2010	Alfonso Umali Jr.	Oriental Mindoro	Liberal	Chavit Singson	Ilocos Sur	Nacionalista
2013	Alfonso Umali Jr.	Oriental Mindoro	Liberal	Arthur Defensor Sr.	Iloilo	Liberal
2016	Ryan Luis Singson	Ilocos Sur	Nacionalista	Al Francis Bichara	Albay	Nacionalista
2019	Presbitero Velasco Jr.	Marinduque	PDP–Laban	Dakila Carlo Cua	Quirino	PDP–Laban
2022	Reynaldo Tamayo Jr.	South Cotabato	PFP	Dakila Carlo Cua	Quirino	PDDS
2025	Reynaldo Tamayo Jr.	South Cotabato	PFP	Dakila Carlo Cua	Quirino	PFP
