= Erick Cañosa =

Filipino politician

The Honourable Erick G. Cañosa
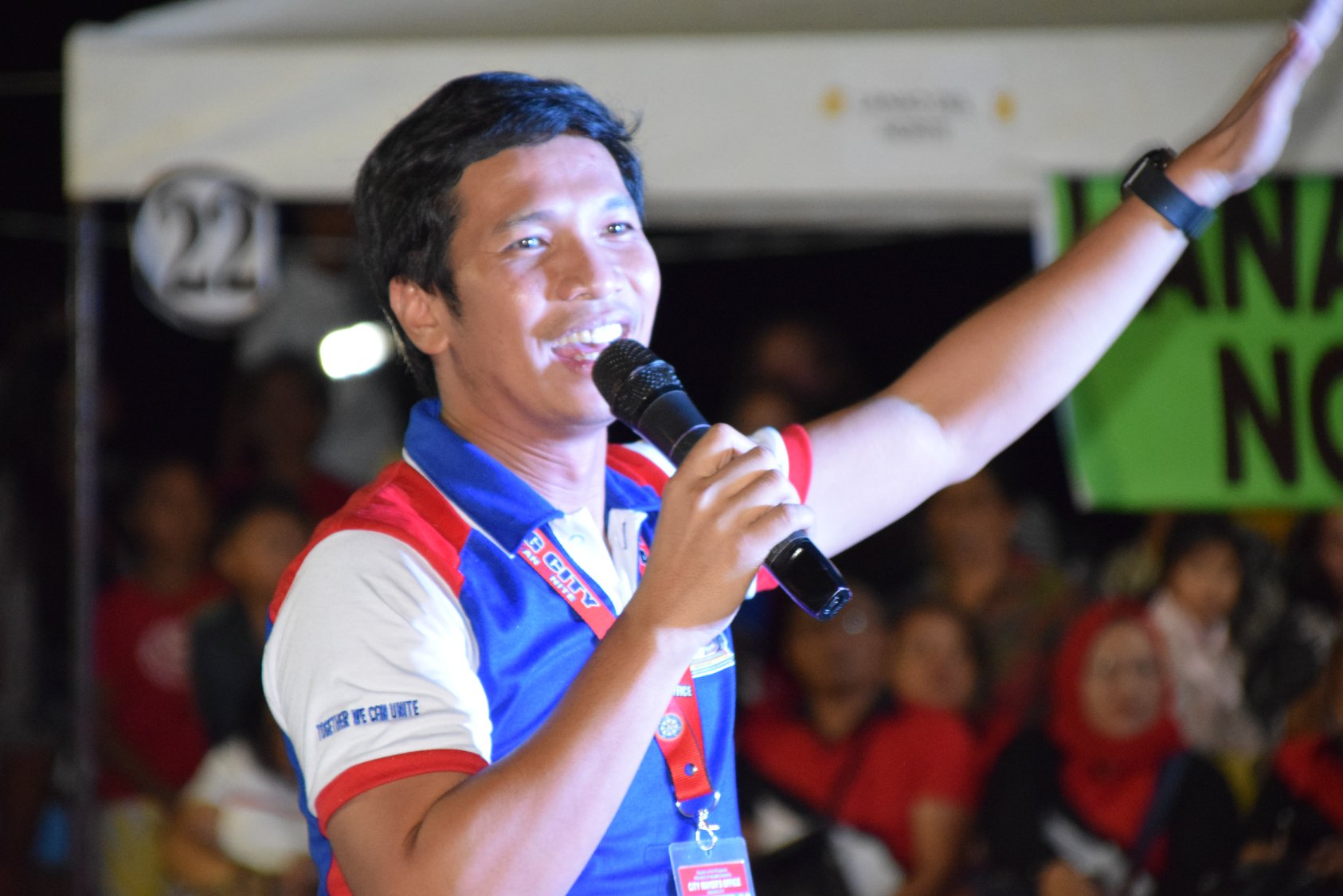
- Cañosa in 2019

Mayor of Gingoog
- Incumbent
- Assumed office June 30, 2019
- Vice Mayor: Peter Unabia (2019–2022); Thaddeus Lugod (2022–present)
- Preceded by: Marie Guingona

Personal details
- Born: Erick Generales Cañosa; January 2, 1982 (age 44) Gingoog, Misamis Oriental, Philippines
- Party: PDP–Laban
- Education: Cebu Doctors' University (BS)
- Occupation: Politician

Erick Generales Cañosa (born January 2, 1982) is a Filipino politician and a medical technologist. He is the incumbent mayor of Gingoog, Misamis Oriental, Philippines. After taking up medical technology in college, he served as a councilor, vice-mayor, and mayor. He is a descendant of a Avelino 'A&E' Cañosa.

== Politics ==
During the 2019 general elections he was elected as mayor of Gingoog. Being newly-elected, on July 1 Cañosa had stated he will conduct a special audit on the City Government as he had received irregularities and questionable transactions relating to the previous administration. "We plan to do special audit if we can see irregularities then that's the time we will act on it," Cañosa said.

On December 12, 2019, during his first State of the City Address (SOCA), Cañosa said his administration would allot P150 million every year for the agricultural sector. "From P28 million each year from the previous administration, we will increase the agriculture budget to P150 million every year starting January. It consists of crops, fishery, livestock, and poultry production," Cañosa said.
