= Constantino Jaraula =

Filipino politician (born 1937)

Constantino Galagnara Jaraula
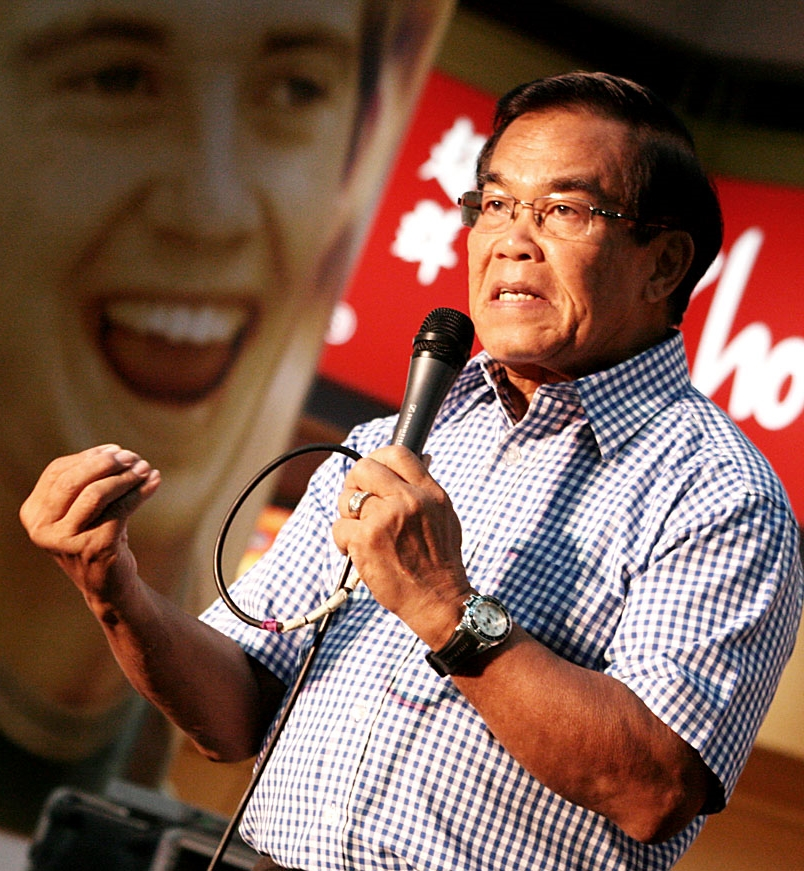

13th Mayor of Cagayan de Oro
- In office June 30, 2007 – June 30, 2010
- Vice Mayor: Vicente Emano
- Preceded by: Vicente Emano
- Succeeded by: Vicente Emano

Member of the Philippine House of Representatives from Cagayan de Oro's at-large congressional district
- In office June 30, 1998 – June 30, 2007
- Preceded by: Erasmo Damasing
- Succeeded by: Post dissolved

Personal details
- Born: June 20, 1937 (age 89) Cagayan de Oro, Misamis Oriental, Philippines
- Party: Lakas-CMD (2004–present)
- Other political affiliations: LDP (2001–2004); LAMMP (1998–2001)
- Spouse: Divina B. Jaraula (died 2024)
- Education: University of the Philippines Diliman (BS, LL.B.)

Constantino "Tinnex" Galagnara Jaraula (born June 20, 1937) is a Filipino lawyer and politician who served as Mayor of Cagayan de Oro from 2007 to 2010. He served as representative of Cagayan de Oro's at-large congressional district during the 11th, 12th, and 13th congresses.

During the 11th Congress, Jaraula's first act was filing a resolution seeking to amend the 1987 Constitution through a constitutional convention. In 2003, during the 12th Congress, he was among the many congressmen that endorsed the unconstitutional impeachment complaint against then-Chief Justice Hilario Davide Jr. In the 13th Congress, he served as the chairman of the House Committee on Constitutional Amendments. The committee during his term approved a charter change bill and was passed by the House of Representatives however it was not taken up by the Senate.

== Controversy ==
In 2021, Jaraula was convicted by the Sandiganbayan alongside Janet Lim-Napoles for graft and corruption in connection with the Priority Development Assistance Fund scandal. In 2024, he was again convicted by the Sandiganbayan for graft over his involvement in the Fertilizer Fund scam in 2004. He was sentenced to suffer 6 to 10 years imprisonment with perpetual disqualification from public office. The court however nullified the P3 million civil liability.

House of Representatives of the Philippines
Preceded by Erasmo Damasing	Representative, Cagayan de Oro's at-large congressional district 1998–2007	District Divided
Political offices
Preceded by Vicente Emano	Mayor of Cagayan de Oro; 2007–2010	Succeeded by Vicente Emano
