= Governor of Misamis Oriental =

Local chief executive

- Gobernador sa Lalawigan sa Sidlakang Misamis (in Cebuano)
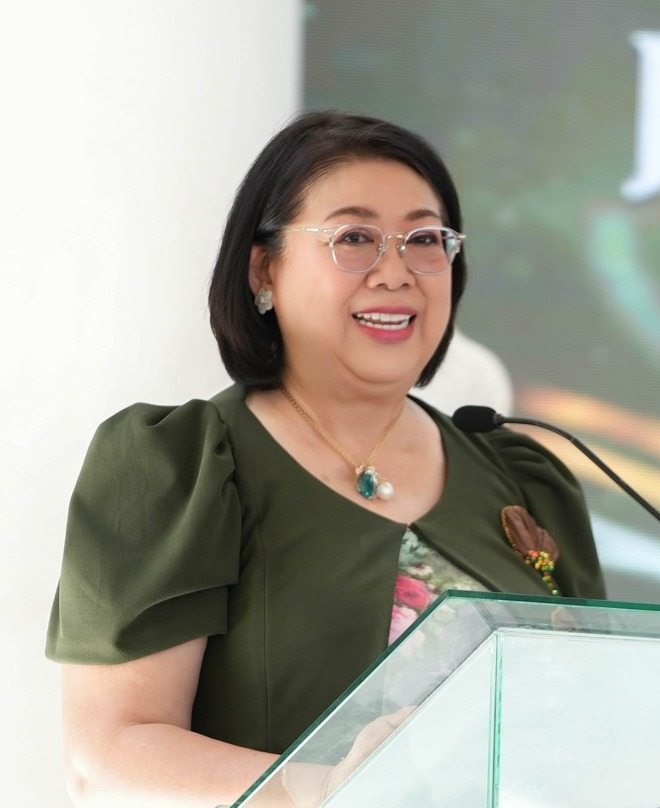
- Incumbent; Juliette T. Uy since June 30, 2025
- Style: The Honorable (Formal)
- Appointer: Elected via popular vote
- Term length: 3 years, not eligible for re-election immediately after three consecutive terms
- Inaugural holder: Don Gregorio Pelaez
- Formation: 1929

The Governor of Misamis Oriental (Filipino: Gobernador ng Lalawigan sa Sidlakang Misamis) is the head of the local government of Misamis Oriental province in Northern Mindanao, Philippines, elected to three-year terms. The governor is also the head of the executive branch and leads the provincial departments in executing the provincial ordinances and improving public services. The provincial governor is restricted to three consecutive terms totaling nine years, although a governor can be elected again after an interruption of one term.

== Misamis Province (District of Cebu) ==
Governor	Term	Note	Ref.
Major José Caraballo	1874–1876		
Lt. Col. Leopoldo Roldán	1877–1883		
Lt. Col. Alberto Bacaj	1883–1884		
Lt. Col. Luis Huertas	1884–1886		
Lt. Col. Conde de Turealta	1886–1887	Served in an acting position.	
Lt. Col. Federico Tianta	1887—1888		
Major Juan Zanón	1888–1890		
Lt. Col. José de Tógores	1890–1893		
Lt. Col. Juan de Frats	1893–1894		
Capt. Ricardo Carmecerno	1895–1896		
Lt. Col. Jose de Tógores	1895–1896		
Lt. Col. Cristóbal de Aguilar	1896–1898		
Cayetano Pacana	1898–1899	Served as gobernadorcillo.	
José Roa y Casas	1899–1900	Served as Provincial President.	

== Undivided Misamis Province ==
Governor	Term	Ref.
Manuel Roa Corrales	1901–1905	
Apolinar Velez	1906–1909	
Ricardo Reyes Barrientos	1910–1912	
Jose Reyes Barrientos	1912–1916	
Isidro Rillas	1917–1919	
Juan Valdeconcha Roa	1920–1922	
Segundo Gaston	1923–1925	

== Province of Misamis Oriental ==
No.	Portrait	Governor	Term	Ref.
1		Don Gregorio A. Pelaez	1926-1931	
2		Gregorio Borromeo	1935-1937	
(1)		Don Gregorio A. Pelaez	1938-1940	
3		Pedro S.A Baculio	1941-1945	
4		Mariano Ope Marbella	1945-1946	
5		Ignacio S. Cruz	1946-1947	
6		Felicisimo E. Aguilar	1948-1950	
7		Paciencio G. Ysalina	1951-1955	
8		Vicente L. De Lara, Sr.	1955-1961	
9		Alfonso R. Dadole	1961-1967	
10		Pedro N. Roa	1968-1969	
11		Concordio C. Diel	1969-1974	
12		Rosauro P. Dongallo	1974-1979	
13		Meynardo A. Tiro	1980	
14		Homobono A. Adaza	1980-1984	
15		Fernando B. Pacana, Jr.	1984-1986	
16		Vicente Y. Emano	1986-1987	
17		Norris C. Babiera	1987-1988	
(16)		Vicente Y. Emano	1988-1998	
18		Ruth de Lara-Guingona	1998	
19		Antonio P. Calingin	1998-2003	
20		Miguel C. de Jesus	2003-2004	
21		Oscar S. Moreno	2004-2013	
22		Yevgeny Vincente B. Emano	2013-2022	
23		Peter M. Unabia	2022-2025	
24		Juliette T. Uy	2025-Present	
