= Cagayan de Oro's at-large congressional district =

Former congressional district in the Philippines

Cagayan de Oro's at-large congressional district is an obsolete congressional district that encompassed the entire Cagayan de Oro prior to its 2007 reapportionment that took effect in the same year. It existed from 1984 to 2007, when Cagayan de Oro elected a representative city-wide at-large to the Batasang Pambansa and to the restored House of Representatives. Before 1984 when it was granted its own seat in the regular Batasan assembly as a highly-urbanized city, Cagayan de Oro was represented as part of the multi-member Region X's at-large assembly district for the Interim Batasang Pambansa and was also included in Misamis Oriental's at-large congressional district in the earlier meetings of the Philippine national legislatures from 1931 to 1972. It was last represented by Constantino Jaraula of the Lakas–CMD.

== Representation history ==
#	Image	Member	Term of office		Batasang Pambansa	Party	Electoral history
#	Image	Member	Start	End	Batasang Pambansa	Party	Electoral history
=== Cagayan de Oro's at-large district for the Regular Batasang Pambansa ===
District created February 1, 1984 from Region X's at-large district.
1		Aquilino Pimentel Jr.	July 23, 1984	March 25, 1986	2nd	PDP–Laban	Elected in 1984.
#	Image	Member	Term of office		Congress	Party	Electoral history
#	Image	Member	Start	End	Congress	Party	Electoral history
=== Cagayan de Oro's at-large district for the House of Representatives of the Philippines ===
District re-created February 2, 1987.
2		Benedicta B. Roa	November 16, 1987	June 30, 1992	8th	Lakas ng Bansa	Elected in 1987.
3		Erasmo B. Damasing	June 30, 1992	June 30, 1998	9th	Liberal	Elected in 1992.
3		Erasmo B. Damasing	June 30, 1992	June 30, 1998	10th	Lakas	Re-elected in 1995.
4		Constantino Jaraula	June 30, 1998	June 30, 2007	11th	LAMMP	Elected in 1998.
4		Constantino Jaraula	June 30, 1998	June 30, 2007	12th	LDP	Re-elected in 2001.
4		Constantino Jaraula	June 30, 1998	June 30, 2007	13th	Lakas	Re-elected in 2004.
District dissolved into Cagayan de Oro's 1st and 2nd districts.

== See also ==
- Legislative districts of Cagayan de Oro
