= Peter Unabia =

Filipino businessman and politician

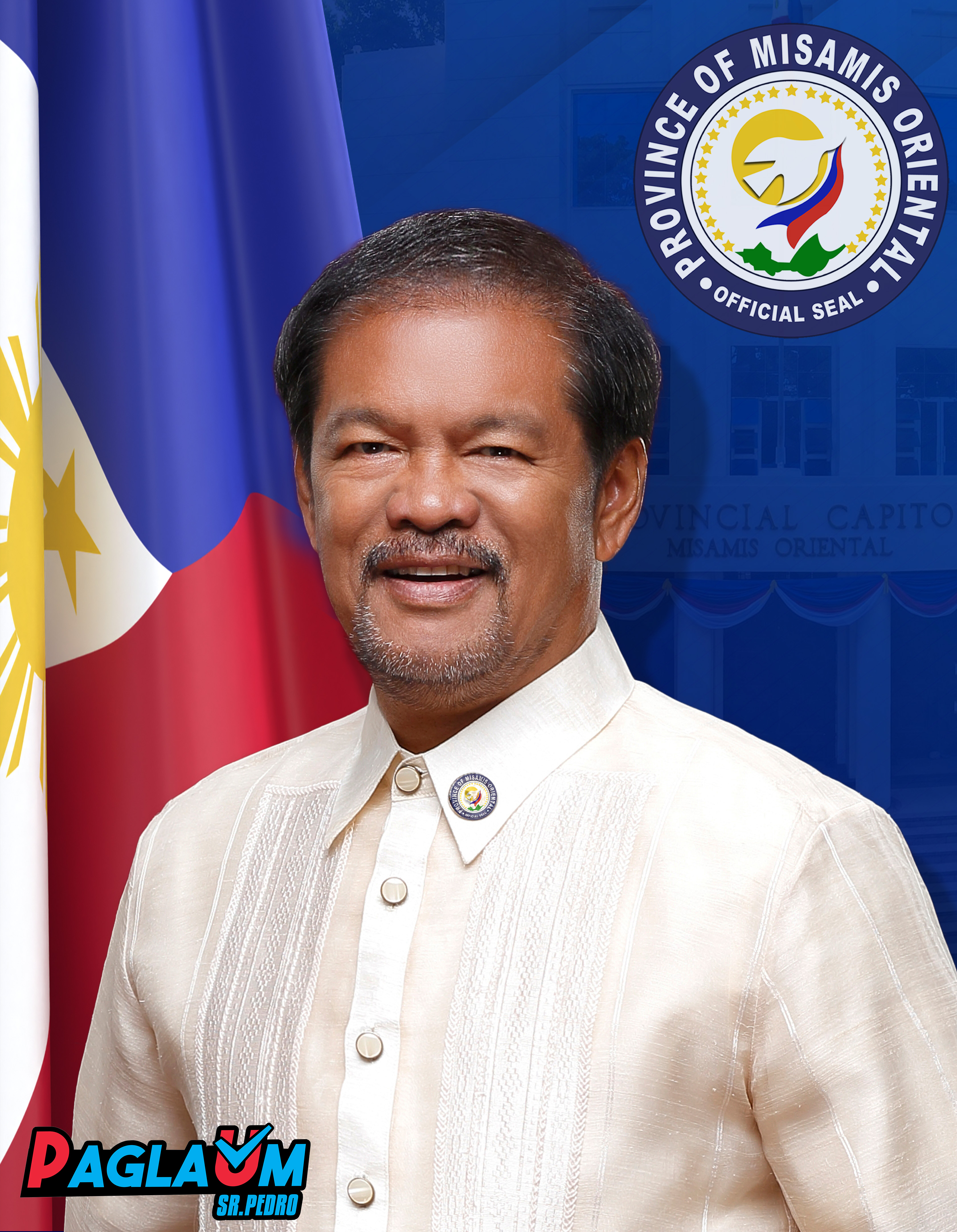
- Official portrait, 2022

Governor of Misamis Oriental
- In office June 30, 2022 – June 30, 2025
- Vice Governor: Jeremy "Jigjag" Pelaez
- Preceded by: Yevgeny "Bambi" Emano
- Succeeded by: Juliette Uy

Vice Mayor of Gingoog
- In office June 30, 2019 – June 30, 2022
- Mayor: Erick Cañosa
- Preceded by: Ruth Guingona
- Succeeded by: Thaddeus Lugod

Member of the Philippine House of Representatives from Misamis Oriental's 1st district
- In office June 30, 2010 – June 30, 2019
- Preceded by: Vacant (Last held by Danilo Lagbas)
- Succeeded by: Christian Unabia

Member of the Misamis Oriental Provincial Board from the 1st district
- In office June 30, 2007 – June 30, 2010

Personal details
- Born: Peter Mamawag Unabia; April 29, 1962 (age 64) Malaybalay, Bukidnon, Philippines
- Party: Lakas (2007–2009; 2021–present)
- Other political affiliations: PDP–Laban (2016–2021); Liberal (2009–2016)
- Spouse: Erlinda S. Unabia
- Children: 3
- Education: Xavier University – Ateneo de Cagayan (BS)
- Occupation: Businessman; politician

Peter Mamawag Unabia (born April 29, 1962), also known as Sr. Pedro, is a Filipino businessman and politician. He most recently served as governor of Misamis Oriental from 2022 to 2025. He also previously served as the vice mayor of Gingoog from 2019 to 2022, and as the representative for Misamis Oriental's 1st district from 2010 to 2019.

== Early life ==
Unabia grew up in barrio Managok, Malaybalay, Bukidnon, the eighth of eleven children. His father, Graciano, was a rice farmer originally from Carcar, Cebu. The young Unabia helped the family by plowing their fields with a carabao. After graduating from San Isidro High School in Malaybalay, he earned a scholarship to attend Xavier University, a Jesuit school in Cagayan de Oro. After graduating from Xavier, he spent a year with the Jesuit Volunteer program in Oriental Mindoro, where as a rice technician, he taught Mangyans better methods of rice production.

== Career ==
=== Business ===
Unabia worked as a salesman for a veterinary company for five years. Afterwards, he independently sold kitchen supplies such as salt, cooking oil, eggs, dressed chicken, and Spam products. He retired as a pharmaceutical sales representative for Unilab. In the 1990s, Unabia and his older brother, Antonietto, established the lechon manok chain Lechon Manok ni Sr. Pedro. The brand name was derived from the radio drama Ang Manok ni San Pedro. The food chain's first branch was opened by Unabia at the corner of Hayes Street and Corrales Avenue in Cagayan de Oro. As of 2022, Lechon Manok ni Sr. Pedro had 500 branches throughout the Philippines. Their business also includes Manok Pinoy dressed chicken and Fido Prito fried chicken, as well as a feed mill, an ice plant, a dressing plant, and grower operations. Unabia's family also owns the Amaya View mountain resort in Cagayan de Oro.

=== Politics ===
In the 2007 elections, Unabia won one of the five seats allocated for the 1st district in the Misamis Oriental Provincial Board. He then represented the 1st district of Misamis Oriental at the House of Representatives for three consecutive terms (2010 to 2019). During the 15th Congress, he voted against the Reproductive Health Bill (now Responsible Parenthood and Reproductive Health Act of 2012). During the 17th Congress, he voted in favor of House Bill No. 4727 which aimed to reinstate capital punishment, and House Bill No. 8858 which aimed to lower the age of criminal responsibility to 12 years old. Unabia considers his co-sponsoring of the Free Irrigation Act as his most important legislative work.

In the 2019 elections, he defeated outgoing Gingoog mayor Marie Guingona for the city's vice mayoral post. Meanwhile, his running mate, Erick Cañosa, was elected mayor. Unabia's son, Christian, won the House seat that he vacated.

In 2022, Unabia was elected governor of Misamis Oriental, defeating Cagayan de Oro mayor Oscar Moreno and Misamis Oriental 2nd district representative Juliette Uy.

During his reelection campaign for the 2025 elections, Unabia was criticized for his remarks described as "hate speech" and "sexist". He ended up losing his rematch with Juliette Uy.

== Controversies ==
In 2017, Unabia was accused of land grabbing by a couple from Cagayan de Oro, who alleged that he illegally fenced off a property they own in barangay Indahag. He countered the accusations by presenting a land title issued to him for the property in 2004.

In April 2025, during a campaign rally for the upcoming elections, Unabia made remarks that were described as "hate speech" toward Muslims. The reelectionist governor linked Muslims to incidents of crime and violence. He then warned his constituents that if his ticket will not win next month's elections, the predominantly Catholic Misamis Oriental might be dominated by Maranaos (a predominantly Muslim ethnic group), resulting in security instability. Unabia's remarks triggered a backlash from Filipino Muslims. 1BANGSA, a coalition of Muslim leaders, described Unabia's words as "hatred and contempt" and demanded for his public apology as well as the following: a boycott of his businesses, his declaration as persona non grata in the Bangsamoro Autonomous Region, and a fatwa against his candidacy. Muslim leaders Mamintal Adiong Jr., the governor of neighboring Lanao del Sur, and Amenah Pangandaman, the Secretary of Budget and Management, both cautioned against divisive political rhetoric. Meanwhile, the Bangsamoro regional government called for "deeper mutual understanding and cultural sensitivity."

Unabia later issued a statement explaining that the viral video of his remarks was a "distorted version" blown "out of proportion" and "out of context" by his political rivals. He insisted that "It was never our intention to cause offense or to undermine … the Maranao people." He explained further that he was discussing a safety concern regarding the "arrival of unfamiliar individuals" to the province, which are "isolated incidents and must never be used to generalize or cast suspicion on an entire group." Unabia also held a meeting behind closed doors with Christian and Muslim leaders and a representative from the National Commission on Muslim Filipinos. The imams present reportedly accepted Unabia's apology. However, Alan Balang-Amer, the national president of 1BANGSA, claimed that the apology was "exclusive" for the Muslims in Cagayan de Oro, and asserted that "Unabia insulted the Muslims from the Bangsamoro, and it just right that he asked forgiveness from all of us."

At another campaign rally, Unabia joked about the province's nursing scholarship program, saying: "This nursing scholarship is only for women, not for men. And only for beautiful women. It won't work if they're unattractive because if a male patient is already weak and an ugly nurse attends to him, his condition could worsen." Gabriela Women's Party condemned Unabia's joke as "a gross display of misogyny and discrimination." Unabia apologized to the nursing profession but reasoned that he made the joke to energize the audience who waited for four hours to hear him speak. He also called his critics "onion-skinned and overly sensitive."

On April 7, the Commission on Elections (COMELEC) issued a show cause order requiring Unabia to explain why a complaint for election offense and/or a petition for disqualification should not be filed against him. According to COMELEC, Unabia's remarks may have violated the Anti-Discrimination and Fair Campaigning Guidelines for the 2025 elections. 1BANGSA also filed a verified intervention before the COMELEC to support the show cause order. In his response, Unabia argued that his remarks were not an election offense, as they "were made in good faith, with no intent to discriminate, harass, or label any person or group" and are covered by the "ambit of protected political expression." On April 28, COMELEC filed a petition to disqualify Unabia.

Political offices
Preceded by Yevgeny Emano	Governor of Misamis Oriental; 2022-Present	Incumbent
House of Representatives of the Philippines
Preceded by Vacant; Last held by Danilo Lagbas	Representative, 1st District of Misamis Oriental; 2010-2019	Succeeded by Christian Unabia
