= Norris Babiera =

Filipino politician

Norris C. Babiera

Vice Governor of Misamis Oriental
- In office June 30, 2007 – June 30, 2013
- Governor: Oscar Moreno
- Preceded by: Julio Uy
- Succeeded by: Jose Mari G. Pelaez

Governor of Misamis Oriental
- Acting
- In office December 1987 – February 1988
- Preceded by: Vicente Emano
- Succeeded by: Vicente Emano

Personal details
- Born: 1953
- Died: July 13, 2017 (aged 63–64)
- Party: Liberal
- Spouse: Patricia Salvo Babiera

Norris C. Babiera (1953 – July 13, 2017) was a Filipino politician who was vice-governor of Misamis Oriental. Before he became the vice-governor, he was acting governor of the said province from December 1987 to February 1988.

In the May 2013 midterm election, he ran for governor of Misamis Oriental under the banner of the Liberal Party, but lost.
