= Vicente Emano =

Filipino politician (1941–2019)

Vicente Yap Emano
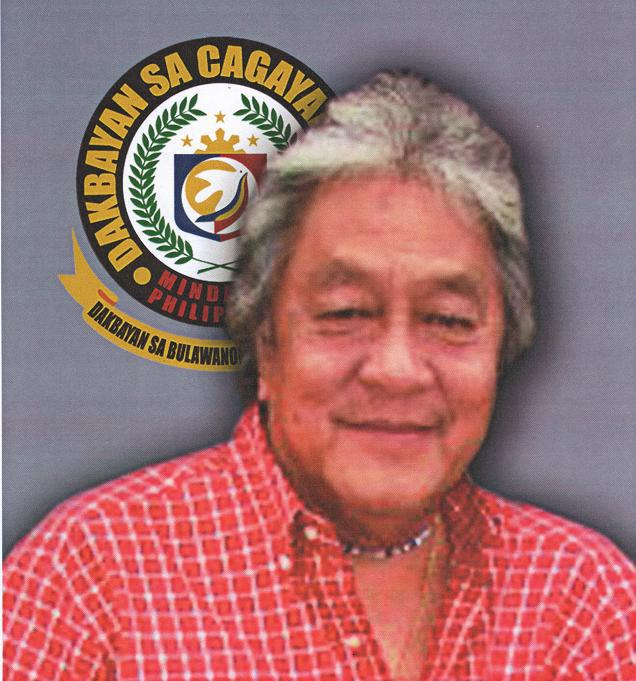

12th & 14th Mayor of Cagayan de Oro
- In office June 30, 2010 – June 30, 2013
- Vice Mayor: Cesar Ian Acenas
- Preceded by: Constantino Jaraula
- Succeeded by: Oscar S. Moreno
- In office June 30, 1998 – June 30, 2007
- Vice Mayor: John L. Elizaga (1998–2004); Michelle Tagarda-Spiers (2004–2007)
- Preceded by: Pablo Magtajas
- Succeeded by: Constantino Jaraula

Governor of Misamis Oriental
- In office 1988–1998
- Preceded by: Norris C. Babiera
- Succeeded by: Ruth de Lara-Guingona

Vice Mayor of Cagayan de Oro
- In office June 30, 2007 – June 30, 2010
- Mayor: Constantino Jaraula
- Preceded by: Michelle Tagarda-Spiers
- Succeeded by: Cesar Ian Acenas

Mayor of Tagoloan
- In office 1980–1986
- Succeeded by: Paulino Emano

Personal details
- Born: March 31, 1943 Tagoloan, Misamis Oriental, Philippines
- Died: May 7, 2019 (aged 76) Cagayan de Oro, Philippines
- Party: PADAYN (1994–2019)
- Other political affiliations: PMP (2009–2013); Lakas (2004–2009); LDP (2001–2004); PDP–Laban (until 1994)
- Spouse: Aloma Beja
- Children: Nenotchka Emano (deceased); Yevgeny "Bambi" Emano; Natasha Emano; Nadya Emano - Elipe; Yvy Emano

Vicente "Dongkoy" Yap Emano (March 31, 1943 – May 7, 2019) was a Filipino politician and was the mayor of the city of Cagayan de Oro from 1998 to 2007 and again from 2010 to 2013; he was the mayor of Tagoloan, Misamis Oriental from 1980 to 1986, governor of the province from 1986 to 1995 and Vice Mayor of Cagayan de Oro city from 2007 to 2010. His son "Bambi" is the current Representative of the 2nd District of Misamis Oriental in the House of Represantatives.

Political offices
Preceded by Pablo Magtajas	Mayor of Cagayan de Oro; 1998–2007	Succeeded by Constantino G. Jaraula
Preceded by Constantino G. Jaraula	Mayor of Cagayan de Oro; 2010–2013	Succeeded by Oscar S. Moreno
Preceded by Norris Babiera	Governor of Misamis Oriental; 1986, 1988–1998	Succeeded by Ruth de Lara-Guingona
