= Danilo Lagbas =

Filipino politician (1952–2008)

Member of the House of Representatives of the Philippines from Misamis Oriental's 1st District
- In office June 30, 2004 – June 8, 2008
- Preceded by: Oscar Moreno
- Succeeded by: Peter Unabia

Personal details
- Born: January 25, 1952
- Died: June 8, 2008 (aged 56)
- Party: Lakas–CMD
- Children: Karen Lagbas

Danilo P. Lagbas (January 25, 1952 – June 8, 2008) was a Filipino politician. A member of the Lakas-CMD Party, he was elected to two terms as a Member of the House of Representatives of the Philippines, representing the First District of Misamis Oriental. He first won election to Congress in 2004, and was re-elected in 2007. He died while in office in June 2008 from lung and liver cancer.

At the time of his death, Lagbas was the Chairperson of the House Committee on Small Business and Entrepreneurship Development. He was a principal author of Republic Act No. 9501, also known as the Magna Carta for Micro, Small and Medium Enterprises. Prior to his election to Congress, Lagbas had served as mayor of his hometown, Sugbongcogon, Misamis Oriental, and as Vice-Governor of the province in 1998.

== Notes ==
Preceded by Oscar S. Moreno	Representative, First District of Misamis Oriental; 2004–2008	Succeeded by Vacant
