= 2013 Philippine House of Representatives elections in Central Visayas =

Elections were held in Central Visayas for seats in the House of Representatives of the Philippines on May 13, 2013.

== Summary ==
Party	Popular vote	%	Swing	Seats won	Change
Liberal				7	
NPC				5	
Lakas				1	
Nacionalista				1	
NUP				1	
UNA				1	
1-Cebu				0	
Independent				0	
Valid votes				16	
Invalid votes					
Turnout					
Registered voters					

== Bohol ==
Each of Bohol's three legislative districts elected representative to the House of Representatives. The candidates with the highest number of votes won the seats.

=== 1st District ===
Rene Relampagos was the incumbent. The last termer and incumbent Tagbilaran city mayor Dan Neri Lim challenged him for the congressional seat.

Philippine House of Representatives election at Bohol's 1st district
Party	Candidate	Votes	%
Liberal	Rene Relampagos	125,442	65.20
NPC	Dan Neri Lim	46,014	23.91
Margin of victory		79,428	41.28%
Invalid or blank votes		20,954	10.89
Total votes		192,410	100.00
Liberal hold			

=== 2nd District ===
Incumbent Erico Aumentado died while in office on December 25, 2012. The Nationalist People's Coalition named his son Aris as their substitute. The younger Aumentado tangled with his father's perennial rival, former three-term congressman and the incumbent Trinidad mayor Roberto Cajes.

Philippine House of Representatives election at Bohol's 2nd district
Party	Candidate	Votes	%
NPC	Erico Aristotle Aumentado	99,691	50.64
Liberal	Roberto Cajes	70,128	35.62
Margin of victory		29,563	15.02%
Invalid or blank votes		27,060	13.74
Total votes		196,879	100.00
NPC hold			

=== 3rd District ===
Incumbent Arthur Yap ran unopposed for the second consecutive election after his opponent, Loboc mayor, Leon Calipusan, backed out for personal reasons.

Philippine House of Representatives election at Bohol's 3rd district
Party	Candidate	Votes	%
NPC	Arthur Yap	127,909	74.93
Invalid or blank votes		42,785	25.07
Total votes		170,694	100.00
NPC hold			

== Cebu ==
Each of Cebu's six and 3 others legislative districts elected representative to the House of Representatives. The candidates with the highest number of votes won the seats.

=== 1st District ===
Incumbent Eduardo Gullas was term limited; he ran for mayor of Talisay City. His party nominated his son, Gerard Anthony.

Philippine House of Representatives election at Cebu's 1st district
Party	Candidate	Votes	%
Nacionalista	Gerard Anthony Gullas, Jr.	153,514	63.88
Invalid or blank votes		86,792	36.12
Total votes		240,306	100.00
Nacionalista hold			

=== 2nd District ===
Pablo P. Garcia was the incumbent.

Philippine House of Representatives election at Cebu's 2nd district
Party	Candidate	Votes	%
Liberal	Wilfredo Caminero	84,256	40.88
NUP	Pablo P. Garcia	77,625	37.66
Independent	Simeon Kintanar	8,607	4.18
Margin of victory		6,901	3.35%
Invalid or blank votes		35,619	17.28
Total votes		206,107	100.00
Liberal gain from NUP			

=== 3rd District ===
Incumbent Pablo John Garcia ran for governor instead. His sister, incumbent Governor Gwen Garcia was party's nominee.

Philippine House of Representatives election at Cebu's 3rd district
Party	Candidate	Votes	%
UNA	Gwen Garcia	94,305	42.71
Liberal	Geraldine Yapha	89,952	40.74
Margin of victory		4,353	1.97%
Invalid or blank votes		36,560	16.56
Total votes		220,817	100.00
UNA gain from NUP			

=== 4th District ===
Benhur Salimbangon was the incumbent.

Philippine House of Representatives election at Cebu's 4th district
Party	Candidate	Votes	%
NUP	Benhur Salimbangon	117,844	55.73
Liberal	Celestino Martinez, III	71,438	33.79
Margin of victory		46,406	21.95%
Invalid or blank votes		22,157	10.48
Total votes		211,439	100.00
NUP hold			

=== 5th District ===
Incumbent Ramon Durano ran for the Danao city vice mayoralty instead; his brother, former tourism secretary Joseph Ace Durano ran under the Liberal Party banner.

Philippine House of Representatives election at Cebu's 5th district
Party	Candidate	Votes	%
Liberal	Joseph Ace Durano	162,036	65.11
1-Cebu	Alfie Pepito	21,936	8.81
Independent	Gilbert Wagas	10,120	4.07
Margin of victory		140,100	56.30%
Invalid or blank votes		54,578	22.00
Total votes		248,850	100.00
Liberal gain from NPC			

=== 6th District ===
Gabriel Luis Quisimbing was the incumbent, his opponent was former congresswoman Nerissa Corazon Soon-Ruiz running under the United Nationalist Alliance banner.

Philippine House of Representatives election at Cebu's 6th district
Party	Candidate	Votes	%
Liberal	Gabriel Luis Quisumbing	125,757	57.98
UNA	Nerissa Corazon Soon-Ruiz	71,209	32.83
Margin of victory		54,548	25.15%
Invalid or blank votes		19,948	9.20
Total votes		216,914	100.00
Liberal hold			

== Cebu City ==
=== 1st District ===
Incumbent Rachel del Mar did not run; her party named Raul del Mar as their nominee. Her primary opponent was actress Annabelle Rama. Rama announced her candidacy for Congress via Twitter in May 2012, debunking rumors that she was running for the city council. Cebu City mayor Michael Rama, her cousin, confirmed Rama's candidacy. The PDP–Laban, one of the parties within the United Nationalist Alliance, adopted Mayor Rama's ticket as their candidates in the elections, including Annabelle Rama.

The Commission on Elections disqualified Junan Arenasa, Pablo Dorinio and Eliseo Tumulak for being "nuisance candidates".

Philippine House of Representatives election at Cebu City's 1st district
Party	Candidate	Votes	%
Liberal	Raul del Mar	133,149	67.84
UNA	Annabelle Rama-Gutierrez	35,716	18.20
Independent	Marlo Maamo	7,092	3.61
Independent	Florencio Villarin	1,558	0.79
Independent	Don Navarro	442	0.23
Independent	Junex Doronio	353	0.18
Independent	Vic Manalac	287	0.15
Margin of victory		97,433	49.65%
Invalid or blank votes		11,662	5.94
Total votes		196,259	100.00
Liberal hold			

==== 2nd District ====
Incumbent Tomas Osmeña ran for mayor against incumbent Cebu City mayor Mike Rama. His party nominated Rodrigo Abellanosa for the South District congressional post.

Philippine House of Representatives election at Cebu City's 2nd district
Party	Candidate	Votes	%
Liberal	Rodrigo Abellanosa	123,757	50.90
UNA	Aristotle Batuhan	99,073	40.75
Margin of victory		24,684	10.15%
Invalid or blank votes		20,311	8.35
Total votes		243,141	100.00
Liberal hold			

== Lapu-Lapu City ==
Incumbent Arturo Radaza did not run; his daughter Aileen Radaza was the party's nominee.

Philippine House of Representatives election at Lapu-Lapu City
Party	Candidate	Votes	%
Lakas–Kampi	Aileen Radaza	60,602	44.77
Liberal	Angel Rodriguez	31,630	24.72
Independent	Remegio Oyao	14,375	11.33
Margin of victory		28,972	22.84%
Invalid or blank votes		20,255	15.97
Total votes		126,862	100.00
Lakas hold			

== Negros Oriental ==
Each of Negros Oriental's three legislative districts elected representatives to the House of Representatives. The candidates with the highest number of votes won the seats.

=== 1st District ===
Incumbent Jocelyn Sy-Limkaichong was on her second term but she decided to run for governor instead. The ruling Liberal Party nominated her brother-in-law, former Land Transportation Franchising and Regulatory Board board member Manuel Iway, as its nominee.

Philippine House of Representatives election at Negros Oriental's 1st district
Party	Candidate	Votes	%
Liberal	Manuel Iway	67,880	49.15
NPC	Jerome Paras	66,072	47.84
Independent	Lowell Andaya	3,399	2.46
Independent	Danilo Roble	755	0.55
Margin of victory		1,808	1.31%
Total votes		138,106	100.00
Liberal hold			

=== 2nd District ===
George P. Arnaiz was the incumbent. His primary opponent was Bais mayor Karen Villanueva.

Philippine House of Representatives election at Negros Oriental's 2nd district
Party	Candidate	Votes	%
NPC	George Arnaiz	68,630	45.67
Liberal	Karen Villanueva	53,462	35.57
Independent	Raul Aniñon	1,422	0.95
Margin of victory		15,168	10.09%
Invalid or blank votes		26,776	17.82
Total votes		150,290	100.00
NPC hold			

=== 3rd District ===
Pryde Henry Teves was the incumbent.

Philippine House of Representatives election at Negros Oriental's 3rd district
Party	Candidate	Votes	%
NPC	Pryde Henry Teves	40,187	49.00
Liberal	Marcelo Andaza	19,074	23.26
Margin of victory		21,113	25.74
Invalid or blank votes		22,751	27.74
Total votes		82,012	100.00
NPC hold			

== Siquijor ==
Orlando B. Fua Sr. was the incumbent on his second term but decided not to run. Instead his party named his son Governor Orlando Fua Jr. as their nominee.

Winning candidate Jose Ray Pernes died May 12, one day before election, because of a heart attack. He was substituted by his wife Marie Anne Pernes.

Philippine House of Representatives election at Siquijor's district
Party	Candidate	Votes	%
Liberal	Marie Anne Pernes	28,395	51.66
Lakas	Orlando Fua, Jr.	23,671	43.06
Margin of victory		4,724	8.59%
Invalid or blank votes		2,900	5.28
Total votes		54,966	100.00
Liberal gain from Lakas			
