= Oscar Moreno (politician) =

Filipino politician (born 1951)

Oscar S. Moreno
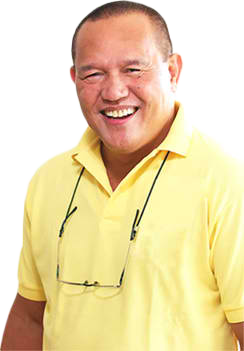
- Moreno in 2013

15th Mayor of Cagayan de Oro
- In office June 30, 2013 – June 30, 2022
- Vice Mayor: Cesar Ian Acenas (2013–2016); Rainier Joaquin Uy (2016–2022)
- Preceded by: Vicente Emano
- Succeeded by: Rolando Uy

Governor of Misamis Oriental
- In office June 30, 2004 – June 30, 2013
- Vice Governor: Julio Uy (2004–2007); Norris Babiera (2007–2013)
- Preceded by: Miguel de Jesus
- Succeeded by: Yevgeny Emano

Member of the Philippine House of Representatives from Misamis Oriental's 1st congressional district
- In office June 30, 1998 – June 30, 2004
- Preceded by: Homobono Cesar
- Succeeded by: Danilo Lagbas

Personal details
- Born: February 28, 1951 (age 75) Balingasag, Misamis Oriental, Philippines
- Party: NUP (2024–present)
- Other political affiliations: PROMDI (2021–2024); PDP–Laban (2018–2021); Liberal (2011–2018); Lakas (1998–2011); Independent (1995–1998)
- Spouse: Arlene P. Moreno
- Children: 3
- Education: Xavier University – Ateneo de Cagayan; San Beda College

Oscar "Oca" Seriña Moreno (born February 28, 1951) is a Filipino lawyer and politician. He served as mayor of Cagayan de Oro from June 30, 2013 to June 30, 2022. Prior to his mayoralty he was governor of Misamis Oriental from 2004 to 2013 and a member of the Philippine House of Representatives for Misamis Oriental’s 1st district from 1998 to 2004.

== Career ==
=== Politics ===
Moreno's first foray in public service was in 1995 when he ran for Representative of the First District of Misamis Oriental. He lost to the then-incumbent, the late Homobono Cezar.

Three years later in 1998, however, Moreno defeated Cezar to sit as representative of the First District of Misamis Oriental.

==== Congressman (1998–2004) ====
During his congressional tenure, he authored and co-authored legislation on fiscal and financial reform, anti-money laundering, barangay micro-business enterprise. Moreno also authored laws to strengthen education, social services and environment protection in the countryside. He was also a member of the Prosecution Panel during the 2000-2001 impeachment trial of President Joseph Ejercito Estrada.

Media organizations such as the Free Press Magazine, Reporter Magazine and the Asusasyon Ne Kumentarista at Anaunser ng Pilipinas named him one of the Top Ten Outstanding Congressmen. He is also a recipient of the Ramon V. Mitra Award.

==== Governor of Misamis Oriental (2004–2013) ====
In 2004, he was elected Governor of the Province of Misamis Oriental and re-elected for two more three year terms in 2007 and 2010.

His administration's agenda primarily focused on people-centered programs geared towards improving their social and economic welfare which would eventually lead to economic growth in the region.

Moreno's platform consists of the following:

1. Poverty alleviation- Improving quality of life especially of the poor;
2. Revenue generation - to fund the provincial government's services and programs to its constituents;
3. Infrastructure - Building roads, schools, classrooms and hospitals among others to serve the province's constituents and spur economic growth;
4. Misortel resuscitation – a rehabilitation program for the province-owned telephone company which incurred financial breakdown due to mismanagement and neglect of past administrations;
5. Education/environment – Improving quality and access to education in the province and institute as well as implement programs that would protect the environment;
6. Hospital services – to provide efficient, responsive health care services to the public especially the poor
7. Agricultural productivity programs – to help improve the livelihood and welfare of farmers and fisher-folk;
8. Teamwork – a key principle in his administration that encourages collaboration among all levels of government, non-government organizations, people's organizations and the private sector.

Under his administration, Misamis Oriental had been conferred twice with the Galing Pook Award for its strategic innovations in its hospital system and for transforming Lantad, a former no-man's land controlled by the communist New People's Army (NPA) to a land of hope and fulfilment.

The Department of Interior and Local Government (DILG) also awarded the provincial government under Moreno's administration with the Gawad Pamana ng Lahi and the Seal of Good Housekeeping for good governance.

Moreno's passion for sports had also catapulted him to key positions in the country's major sports organizations such as the Samahang Basketbol ng Pilipinas where he is now its chairman and as vice chairman of the Amateur Boxing Association of the Philippines.

==== The 'Lantad Initiative' ====
Prioritizing infrastructure in his development agenda was a key element in Moreno's opening of sitio (Spanish for site) Lantad in Barangay (village) Kibanban in Balingasag town, Misamis Oriental.

Long established as the seat of the communist movement in northern Mindanao, sitio Lantad was a battleground between the military and the communist New People's Army rebels in the 80s.

Months after he assumed office in 2004, then governor Moreno ordered the building of roads that would open access to and from Lantad and ensured the delivery of basic services to its residents who are mostly farmers.

Moreno's work in transforming Lantad from what its residents would describe as a 'no-man's land' to a thriving rural community earned him a Galing Pook Award from the national government and he would use this experience to push for more projects to communities long neglected by government.

His “Lantad Initiative” would also be cited by the country's military as a critical component in the government's overall strategy to resolving the communist insurgency which had plagued the country for more than 50 years.

==== Finishing the Laguindingan Airport project (2006–2013) ====
Midway through his first term in the Capitol, Moreno was instrumental in kick-starting the implementation and shepherding the completion of the long delayed Laguindingan Airport project in 2006.

The groundbreaking ceremonies for the airport project held in January 2008 was graced by then president Gloria Macapagal-Arroyo who pushed for construction of an international airport in the Cagayan de Oro-Iligan corridor.

But actual work on the airport project, a centerpiece program of the Cagayan-Iligan-Corridor (CIC) masterplan, had been bogged down since 1992 by land acquisition negotiations with the affected settlers and raising counterpart funding to purchase the 300 hectares required for the airport complex.

As governor, Moreno facilitated and fast-tracked dialogue between government agencies and the affected homeowners for the land acquisition component of the airport project. Moreno also ordered construction of the 4.4 kilometer access road that would link the new airport to a national road.

The eventual transfer of the airport from its former site in the hinterland barangay (village) of Lumbia in Cagayan de Oro and completion of the Laguindingan Airport project occurred in April 2013 during campaign season when Moreno ran and won Cagayan de Oro's mayoral seat from Vicente Emano, a former Misamis Oriental governor.

==== Mayor of Cagayan de Oro (2013-2022) ====
The inauguration as Mayor of Cagayan de Oro was held on June 30, 2013. The construction of hundreds of elementary and high school classrooms for the poor and the revival of the J.R. Borja Memorial City Hospital, including several free medical services for the less fortunate, are only some of the achievements within less than three years in service for the city.

When he assumed office as City Mayor of Cagayan de Oro in June 2013, Education has been his priority program, thus from 2014 to 2019, the city government managed to build 548 classrooms, with 48 more under construction on his last few months of office before the May 2019 Election, where he is running for re-election under the ruling national PDP–Laban party.

In 2022, Moreno ran for governor of Misamis Oriental; he finished third, behind Gingoog vice mayor Peter Unabia and Misamis Oriental 2nd district representative Juliette Uy.

==== 2025 mayoral comeback attempt ====
In the 2025 elections, Moreno ran again for mayor of Cagayan de Oro. He finished third, behind incumbent mayor Rolando Uy and former Phividec Industrial Authority administrator Jose Gabriel "Pompee" La Viña.

=== Other ===
He started as a trial attorney at the Philippine National Railways and later became the corporate legal counsel of major financial institutions in the country such as the Far East Bank and Trust Co., Ayala Investment and Development Corp., Ayala International Finance Ltd. (Hong Kong), Bank of the Philippines Islands, Citibank, Ayala Life Assurance, Inc. and FGU Insurance Corp.. He then became Associate Director of the Strategic Planning Group of Ayala Corp. and Vice President and Chief Legal Counsel of BPI Capital Corp.

== Education ==
He graduated at the Balingasag Central School and finished secondary education at Xavier University - Ateneo de Cagayan. He took up Bachelor of Arts at the University of Manila; finished his Bachelor of Laws degree at San Beda College. He took and passed the bar exams in 1975.

Among his international trainings include an Executive Program for Leaders in Development and Program on Budgeting and Financial Management in the Public Sector at the Kennedy School of Government, Harvard University in Massachusetts, USA; International Workshop on Privatization, Regulatory Reform and Corporate Governance at Princeton University, New Jersey, USA; Program on Fiscal Decentralization and Local Government Financial Management at Duke University, North Carolina, USA. During his stint as governor of Misamis Oriental, he participated in the Mindanao Bridging Leaders Program at the Asian Institute of Management.

== Personal life ==
Moreno was born in Balingasag, Misamis Oriental to Dr. Emeterio A. Moreno Sr., who served in the town's barangays and Milagros Roa Seriña, a retired public school teacher and music instructor. He is married to Arlene Parado Pasion from Laoag City and Dingras, Ilocos Norte with whom he has three children – Sean Oliver, Imee Rose and Oscar Jr.

He has a passion for sports and is the vice-chairman and regional president of the Amateur Boxing Association of the Philippines. He also served as the chairman of the Samahang Basketbol ng Pilipinas.

== See also ==
- Misamis Oriental
- 11th Congress of the Philippines
- 12th Congress of the Philippines

Preceded by Homobono T. Cesar	Representative, 1st District of Misamis Oriental; 1998–2004	Succeeded by Danilo P. Lagbas
Preceded by Antonio Calingin	Governor Of Misamis Oriental; 2004–2013	Succeeded by Yevgeny "Bambi" Beja Emano
Preceded by Vicente Emano	Mayor of Cagayan de Oro; 2013-2022	Succeeded by Rolando "Klarex" A. Uy
