= Juliette Uy =

Filipino politician

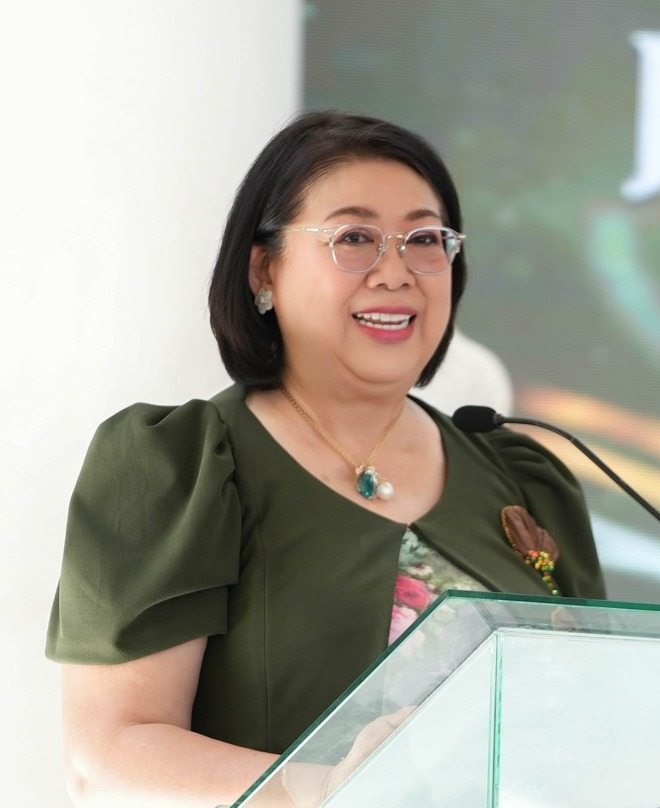
- Uy in 2025

Governor of Misamis Oriental
- Incumbent
- Assumed office June 30, 2025
- Vice Governor: Jeremy "Jigjag" Pelaez
- Preceded by: Peter Unabia

Member of the Philippine House of Representatives from Misamis Oriental's 2nd district
- In office June 30, 2013 – June 30, 2022
- Preceded by: Yevgeny Emano
- Succeeded by: Yevgeny Emano

Personal details
- Born: June 20, 1962 (age 63) Cagayan de Oro, Misamis Oriental, Philippines
- Party: NUP (2013–present)
- Other political affiliations: Independent (2012–2013)
- Spouse: Julio Uy
- Children: 1

Juliette Tiu Uy (born June 20, 1962) is a Filipino politician serving as the governor of Misamis Oriental since 2025. She previously served as the representative of Misamis Oriental's 2nd district from 2013 to 2022. She is a member of the National Unity Party (NUP).

== Early life and education ==
Juliette Uy hails from Villanueva, Misamis Oriental. She completed her secondary education at Kong Hua School and pursued higher education at Xavier University – Ateneo de Cagayan in Cagayan de Oro.

== Political career ==
=== House of Representatives (2013–2022) ===
Uy began her political career in provincial politics in 2013, when she was elected Representative of Misamis Oriental's 2nd congressional district. During her tenure, she focused on healthcare and community welfare. Notably, she authored House Bill 3462, which proposed the establishment of a 25-bed hospital in Villanueva, aiming to improve local healthcare infrastructure.

=== 2022 gubernatorial election ===
In 2022, Uy ran for Governor of Misamis Oriental but was defeated by Peter Unabia.

=== 2025 gubernatorial election ===
Uy contested the gubernatorial seat again in the 2025 elections, facing incumbent Governor Peter Unabia in a rematch.

On May 13, 2025, Uy was proclaimed as the newly elected Governor of Misamis Oriental, securing 327,305 votes against Unabia's 235,023.

== Personal life ==
Uy is married to Julio Uy, a former Mayor of Villanueva who became vice governor of Misamis Oriental. Their daughter, Jennie Rosalie Uy-Mendez, also became Mayor of Villanueva.

== See also ==
- List of female governors in the Philippines
- List of female members of the House of Representatives of the Philippines
