= Yevgeny Emano =

Filipino politician

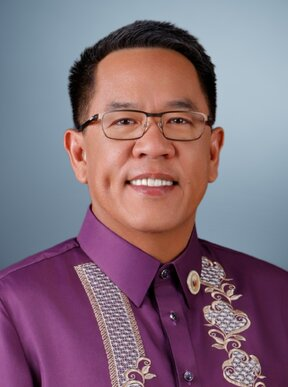
- Official portrait, 2025

Deputy Speaker of the House of Representatives of the Philippines
- Incumbent
- Assumed office August 11, 2025 Serving with several others
- House Speaker: Martin Romualdez; Faustino "Bojie" Dy III

Member of the Philippine House of Representatives from Misamis Oriental's 2nd District
- Incumbent
- Assumed office June 30, 2022
- Preceded by: Juliette Uy
- In office June 30, 2007 – June 30, 2013
- Preceded by: Augusto H. Baculio
- Succeeded by: Juliette Uy

Governor of Misamis Oriental
- In office June 30, 2013 – June 30, 2022
- Vice Governor: Jose Mari G. Pelaez (2013–2019); Jeremy Jonahmar G. Pelaez (2019–2022)
- Preceded by: Oscar Moreno
- Succeeded by: Peter Unabia

Mayor of Tagoloan, Misamis Oriental
- In office June 30, 1998 – June 30, 2007
- Preceded by: Paulino Y. Emano
- Succeeded by: Paulino Y. Emano

Personal details
- Born: Yevgeny Vincente Beja Emano; January 29, 1975 (age 51) Cagayan de Oro, Philippines
- Party: Nacionalista (2007–present); PADAYN (local party; 1998–present)
- Other political affiliations: Lakas (2004–2007); LDP (2001–2004)
- Relations: Vicente Emano (father)
- Education: Xavier University – Ateneo de Cagayan

Yevgeny Vincente Beja Emano (born January 29, 1975), also known as Bambi Emano, is a Filipino politician serving as the Representative of Misamis Oriental's 2nd district since 2022, having previously served from 2007 to 2013. He also previously served as governor of Misamis Oriental from 2013 to 2022, and mayor of Tagoloan, Misamis Oriental from 1998 to 2007.

Political offices
Preceded by Oscar S. Moreno	Governor of Misamis Oriental; 2013-2022	Succeeded by Peter M. Unabia
Preceded by Paulino Y. Emano	Mayor, Tagoloan, Misamis Oriental; 1998-2007	Succeeded by Paulino Y. Emano
House of Representatives of the Philippines
Preceded by Augusto H. Baculio	Congressman of the Second District of Misamis Oriental; 2007-2013	Succeeded by Juliette T. Uy
Preceded by Juliette T. Uy	Congressman of the Second District of Misamis Oriental; 2022-present	Incumbent
