= Cagayan de Oro =

Highly-urbanized city in Northern Mindanao, Philippines

- Highly urbanized city
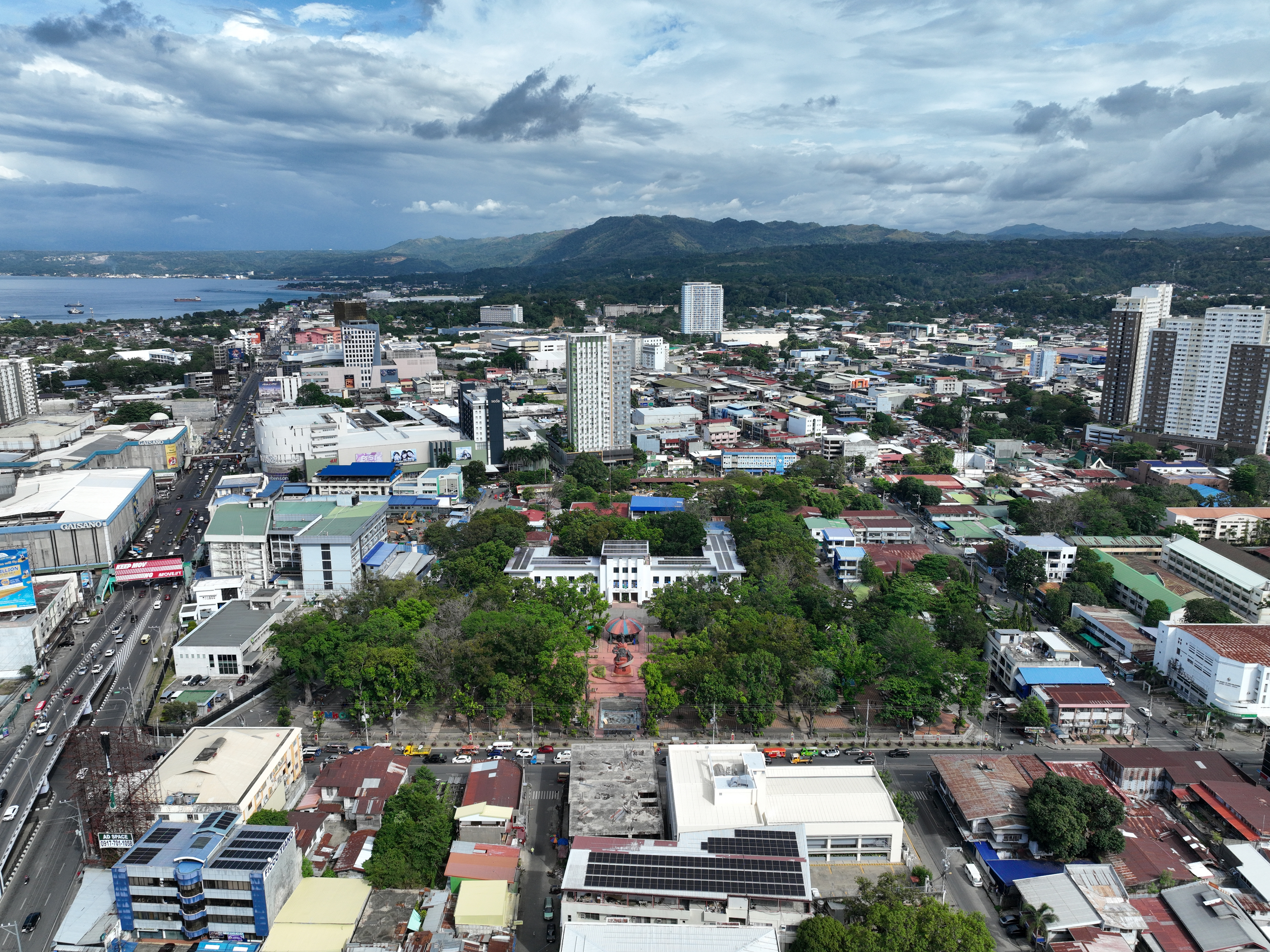
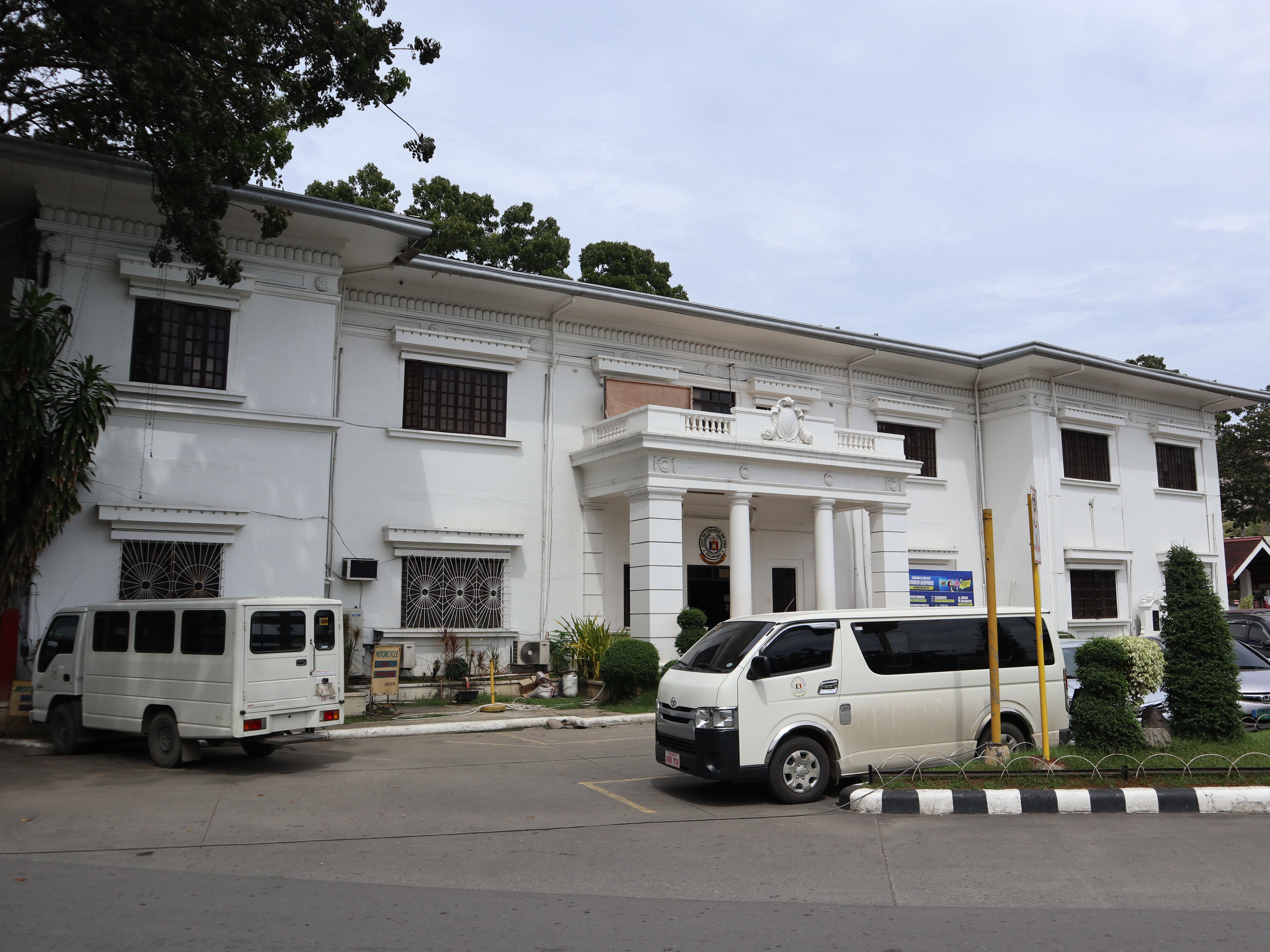
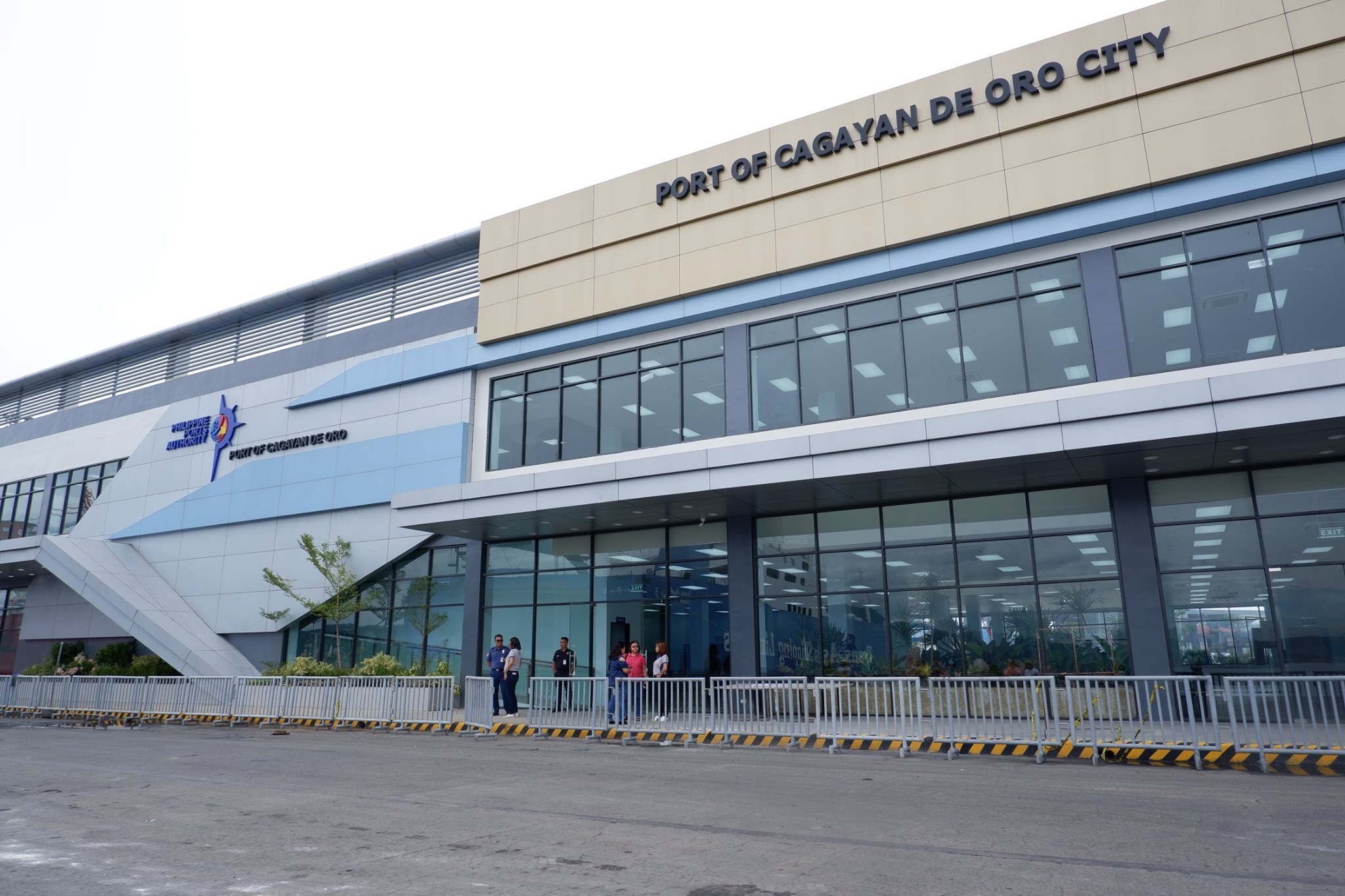
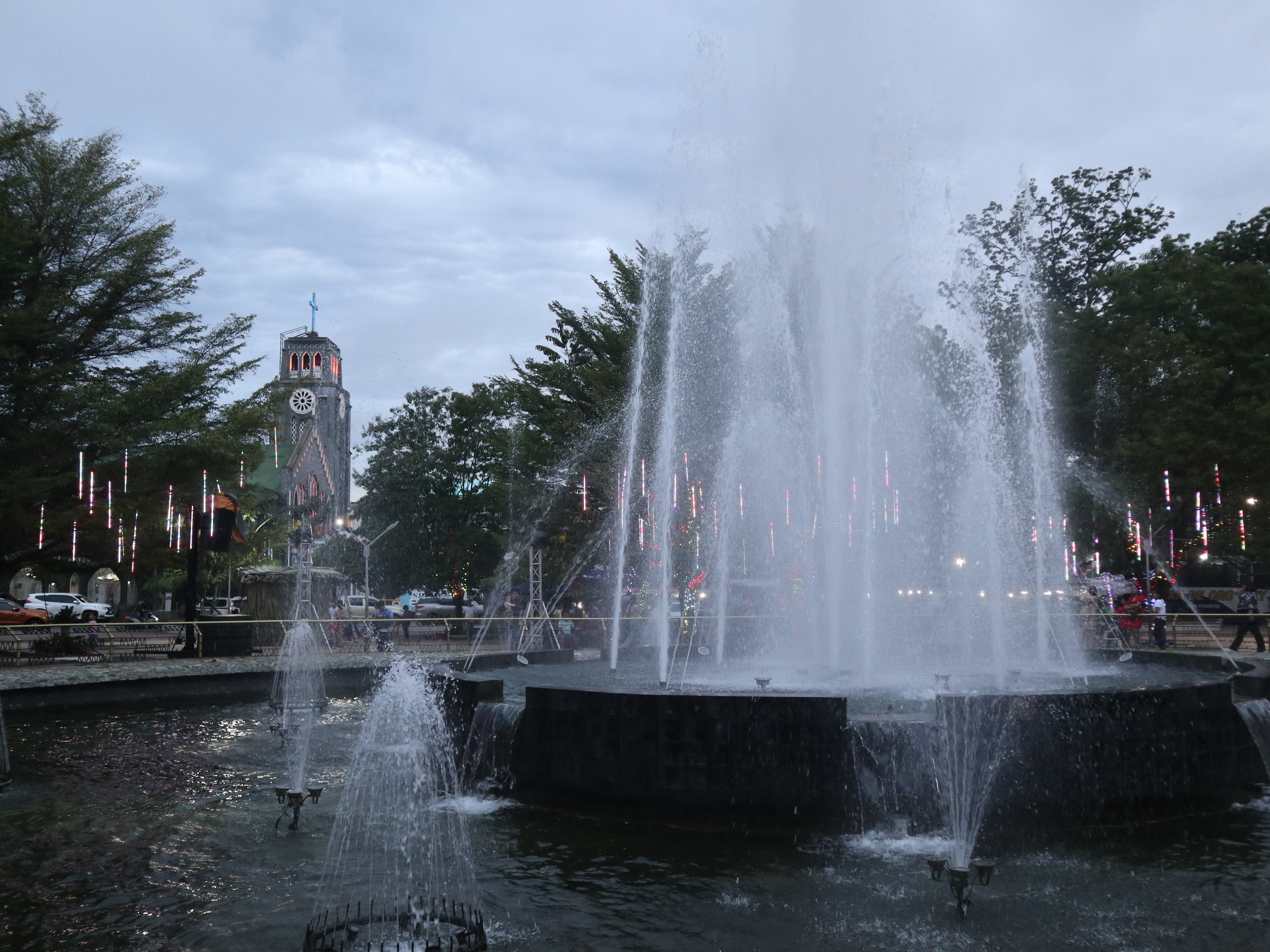
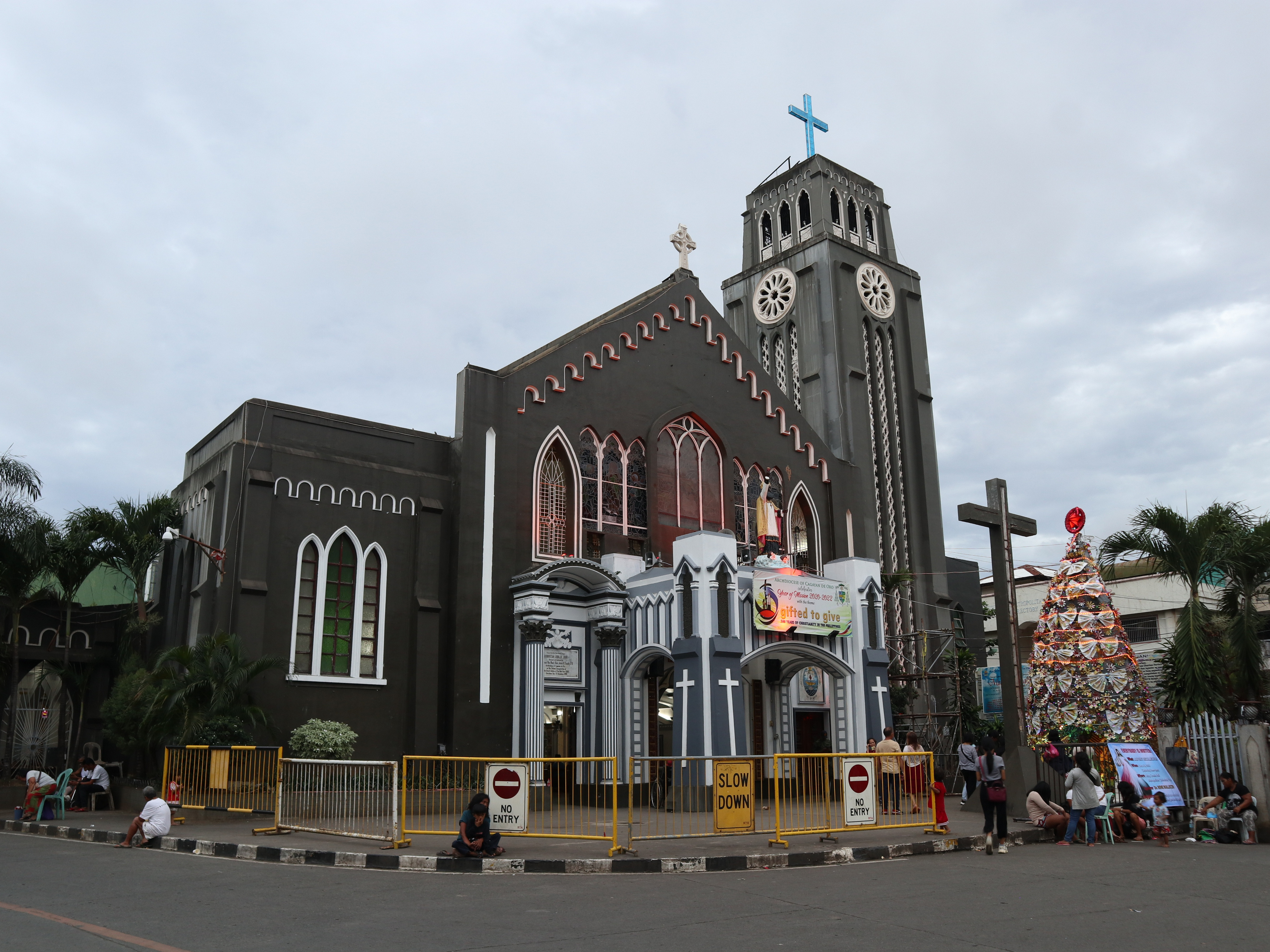
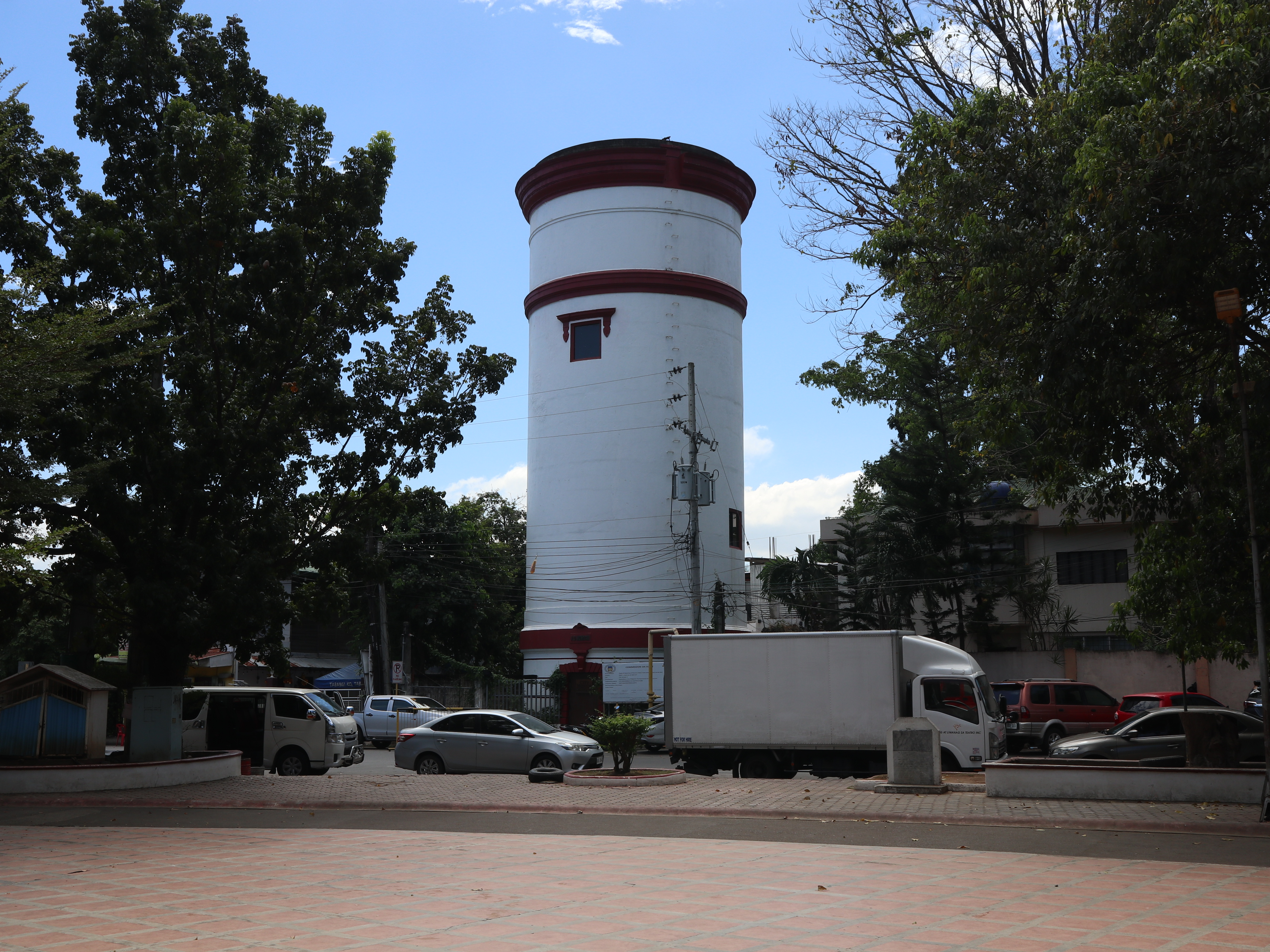
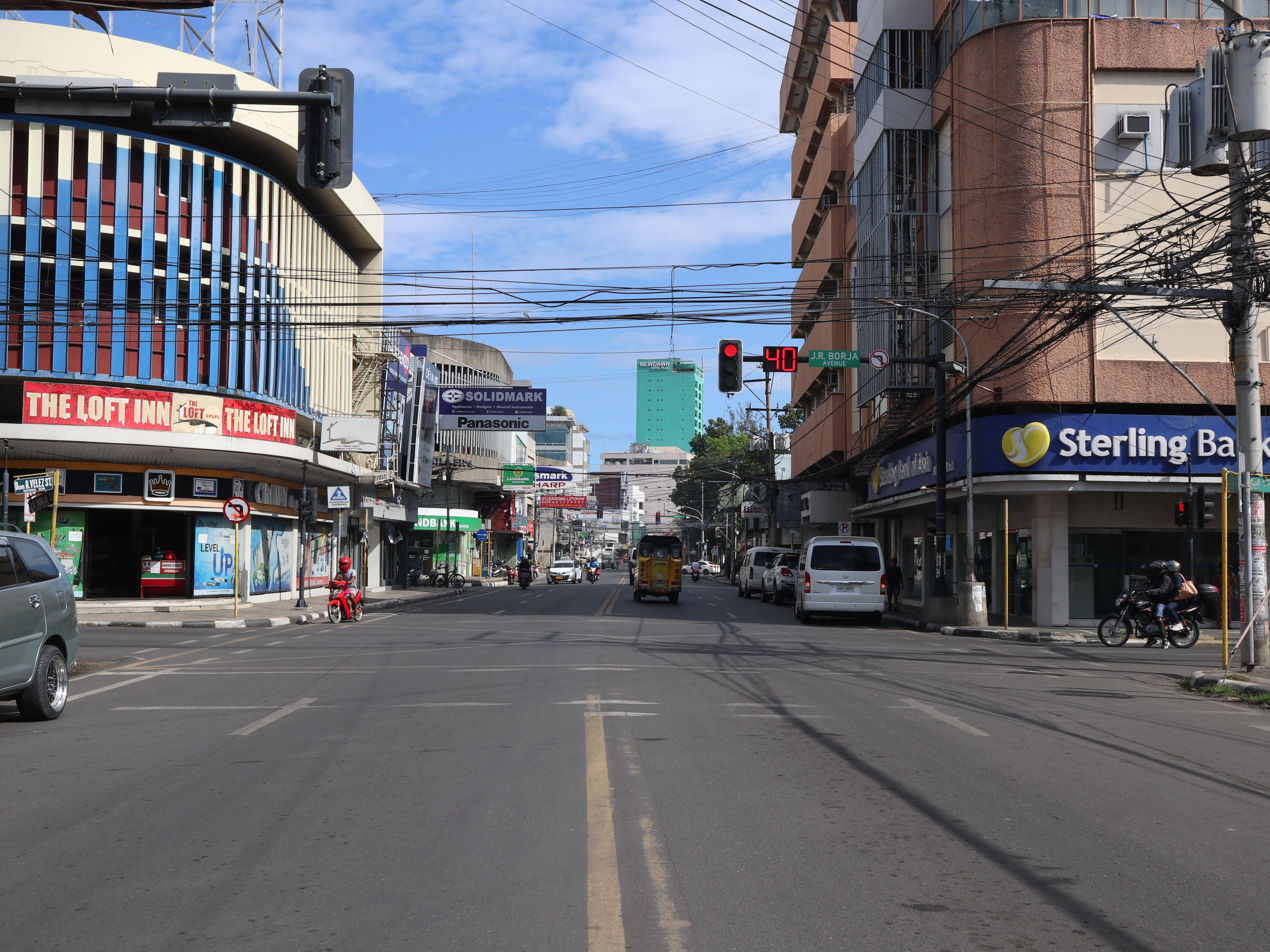
- Skyline City Hall Port of Cagayan de Oro Gaston Park Saint Augustine Cathedral Cagayan de Oro City Museum A. Velez Street corner J. R. Borja Avenue

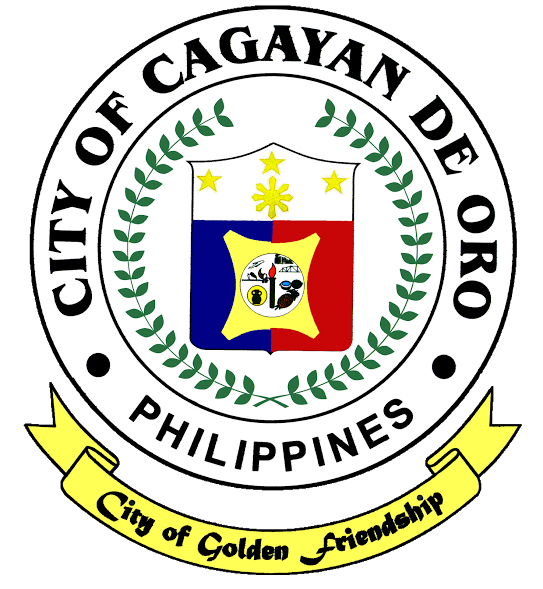
- Flag Seal
- Etymology: Cagayan de Misamis
- Nicknames: City of Golden Friendship; Whitewater Rafting Capital of the Philippines; City of Gold
- Anthem: "Cagayan de Oro March"
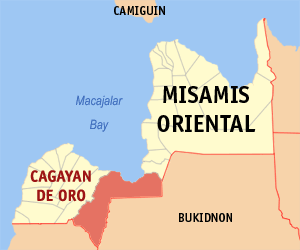
- Map of Northern Mindanao with Cagayan de Oro highlighted
- Interactive map of Cagayan de Oro
- Location within the Philippines
- Coordinates: 8°29′N 124°39′E
- Country: Philippines
- Region: Northern Mindanao
- Province: Misamis Oriental (geographically only)
- District: 1st and 2nd districts
- Settlement re-established: 1626
- Town: 1871
- Cityhood: June 15, 1950
- Highly urbanized city: November 22, 1983
- Barangays: 80 (see Barangays)

Government
  - Type: Sangguniang Panlungsod
  - Mayor: Rolando Adlao Uy (PFP)
  - Vice Mayor: Jocelyn B. Rodriguez (CDP)
  - Representatives: List: 1st LegDist; Lordan G. Suan (Lakas); 2nd LegDist; Rufus B. Rodriguez (CDP)
  - City Council: Members: 1st District; Desiree Ann Dahino; Roger G. Abaday; Juancho R. Pascual; Agapito Eriberto G. Suan; George Christopher Goking; Moreno Y. Daba IV; Al Legazpi; Imee Rose Moreno-Lapuz; 2nd District; Yevonna Yacine B. Emano; Maximo Rodriguez III; Paolo Niccolo Gaane; Joyleen Mercedes L. Balaba; Yan Lam S. Lim; Enrico Salcedo; Gilda Go; Edgar S. Cabanlas; Ex-Officio Member - ABC; Ex-Officio Member - SK; Kenneth John D. Sacala; Ex-Officio Member - IPMR; Datu Roberto P. Cabaring
  - Electorate: 414,695 voters (2025)

Area
  - City: 412.80 km^{2} (159.38 sq mi)
- Elevation: 428 m (1,404 ft)
- Highest elevation: 2,892 m (9,488 ft)
- Lowest elevation: 0 m (0 ft)

Population (2024 census)
  - City: 741,617
  - Rank: 10th
  - Density: 1,796.6/km^{2} (4,653.1/sq mi)
  - Metro: 1,687,159
  - Households: 190,225
- Demonym(s): Cagayanons; Kagay-anons

Economy
  - Gross domestic product: ₱317.41 billion (2025) $5.40 billion (2025)
  - Income class: 1st city income class
  - Poverty incidence: 10.3% (2023)
  - HDI: ▲0.793 (High)
  - Revenue: ₱ 5,888 million (2024)
  - Assets: ₱ 16,816 million (2024)
  - Expenditure: ₱ 5,396 million (2024)
  - Liabilities: ₱ 8,628 million (2024)

Service provider
  - Electricity: Cagayan Electric Power and Light Company (CEPALCO)
  - Water: Cagayan de Oro Water District (COWD)
  - Cable TV: Parasat Cable TV
- Time zone: UTC+08:00 (PST)
- ZIP code: 9000
- PSGC: 104305000
- IDD : area code: +63 (0)88
- Abbreviations: CdeO, CDO, CDOC, Cag. de Oro
- Feast date: August 28
- Patron saint: Augustine of Hippo
- Website: cagayandeoro.gov.ph

Cagayan de Oro (CDO), officially the City of Cagayan de Oro, (Note: Cebuano: Dakbayan sa Cagayan de Oro; Tagalog: Lungsod ng Cagayan de Oro; Binukid: Ciudad ta Cagayan de Oro; Maguindanaon: Kuta nu Kagayan de Oro; Kapampangan: Ciudad/Lakanbalen ning Cagayan de Oro; Hiligaynon: Dakbanwa sang Cagayan de Oro; Ilocano: Siudad ti Cagayan de Oro; Pangasinan: Siyudad na Cagayan de Oro; Central Bikol: Siyudad kan Cagayan de Oro; Waray: Syudad han Cagayan de Oro) is a highly urbanized city in the Northern Mindanao region of the Philippines. According to the 2024 census, it has a population of 741,617 people, making it the 10th most populous city in the Philippines and the most populous in Northern Mindanao.

It serves as the capital of the province of Misamis Oriental wherein it is geographically situated and grouped under the province by the Philippine Statistics Authority, but governed administratively independent from the provincial government and also the largest city of that province. It also serves as the regional center and business hub of Northern Mindanao, and part of the growing Metropolitan Cagayan de Oro area, which includes the city of El Salvador, the towns of Opol, Alubijid, Laguindingan, Gitagum, Lugait, Naawan, Initao, Libertad and Manticao at the western side, and the towns of Tagoloan, Villanueva, Jasaan, Claveria and Balingasag at the eastern side.

Cagayan de Oro is located along the north central coast of Mindanao island facing Macajalar Bay and is bordered by the municipalities of Opol to the west, Tagoloan to the east, and the provinces of Bukidnon and Lanao del Norte to the south of the city.

Cagayan de Oro is also famous for its white water rafting or kayaking adventures, one of the tourism activities being promoted along the Cagayan de Oro River.

== Etymology ==
The name Cagayan de Oro (lit. River of Gold) can be traced back to the arrival of the Spanish Augustinian Recollect friars in 1622, the area around Himologan (now Huluga), was already known as "Cagayán". Early Spanish written documents in the 16th century already referred to the place as "Cagayán". Variations of this word—karayan, kayan, kahayan, kayayan, kagayan and kalayan—all also mean river.

The region of Northern Mindanao, which included Cagayan de Oro, was granted as encomienda to a certain Don Juan Griego on January 25, 1571. It was then former Vice President of the Philippines Emmanuel Peláez who appended "de Oro" to Cagayan.

The name "Cagayan" is shared by other places in the Philippines; these include the province of Cagayan in Cagayan Valley, northern Luzon–in which is said to have similar reference with Cagayan de Oro as they refer to their respective rivers with the same name (one being the longest in the Philippines), the Cagayan Islands in the northern Sulu Sea, and the former Cagayan de Sulu, currently named Mapun, an island in Tawi-Tawi.

== History ==
=== Prehistoric period ===
The Cagayan de Oro area was continuously inhabited by Late Neolithic to Iron Age Austronesian cultures. The oldest human remains discovered was from the Huluga Caves, once used as a burial place by the natives. A skullcap sent to the Scripps Institution of Oceanography in 1977 was dated to be from between 350 and 377 AD.

The caves have yielded numerous artifacts, but most areas have been badly damaged by guano collectors and amateur treasure hunters. Associated with the cave is the Huluga Open Site, believed to be the site of the primary pre-colonial settlement in the region identified as "Himologan" by the first Spanish missionaries. The site is located about eight kilometers from present-day Cagayan de Oro.

=== Early historic period ===
The discovery of a grave site in 2009 uncovered remains of Song dynasty (960–1279 AD) celadon ware and Sukhothai period (1238–1347 AD) Sangkhalok ceramic ware, in addition to body ornaments and stone tools. It indicates that the region was part of the ancient maritime trading network of Southeast Asia. Skulls recovered from the sites show that native Kagay-anons practiced artificial cranial deformation since childhood as a mark of social status, similar to skulls from archeological sites in neighboring Butuan.

The Huluga Open Site was extensively damaged in 2001 to give way to a bridge project by the local administration. It was the source of controversy when a team from the University of the Philippines-Archaeological Studies Program dismissed the archeological importance of the site by declaring it as a "camp-like area" and not a settlement and thus not worthy of heritage protection under the laws. It was alleged by local conservationists that the UP-ASP team were influenced by the local government so the bridge project could continue. The site is still not protected and continues to be quarried, despite protests by local historians and archeologists.

=== Colonial period ===
==== Spanish period ====
The Himologan settlement was still occupied by the time the Europeans made contact. In 1622, two Spanish Augustinian Recollect missionaries reached the settlement and described it as being inhabited by a mixed stock descended from Lumad and sea-faring Visayans ("Dumagat"). They described the men of the settlement as being tattooed like other Visayans and the women as being ornamented with intricate jewelry, some of which were golden. They also identified them as animists, practicing traditional anitism, though they paid tribute to Muhammad Kudarat, the sultan of the Islamized Sultanate of Maguindanao to the south.

The original Lumad inhabitants of Cagayan de Oro (and Misamis Oriental in general) are the Higaonon people whose name means "people of the coast", from the Higaonon word higa, meaning "coastal plain" or "shore". They resisted the Spanish Reducciones policies and were displaced by more incoming Dumagat migrants (mostly Visayans) during the Spanish colonial period. Most Higaonon moved to the interior highlands of Misamis Oriental and northern Bukidnon.

In 1626, Fray Agustín de San Pedro persuaded the chief of Himologan, Datu Salangsang, to transfer his settlement down the Cagayan River, to the present-day Gaston Park. De San Pedro later fortified the new settlement against Sultan Kudarat's raiders.

In 1738, Spanish dominance was felt in Cagayan de Oro. When Misamis gained the status of province in 1818, one of its four districts was the Partidos de Cagayan. In 1871, the "Partidos" became a town and was made a permanent capital of Misamis. Of which there were 38 Spanish-Filipino families.

On February 27, 1872, Governor-General Carlos María de La Torre issued a decree declaring Cagayan the permanent capital of Segundo Distrito de Misamis. During this era, the name of the town was known as Cagayan de Misamis.

In 1883, the town became a seat of the Spanish government in Mindanao for the provinces of Misamis Oriental, Misamis Occidental, Bukidnon and Lanao del Norte.

The Spanish authorities surrendered to Misamis governor Jose Roa and municipal mayor Toribio Chavez, both appointees of President Emilio Aguinaldo. With the Fiesta Nacional of January 10–11, 1899, their independence was celebrated as the Philippine flag was raised for the second time in Mindanao. At that time, the town joined the Aguinaldo government in the second time it was declared.

==== American period ====
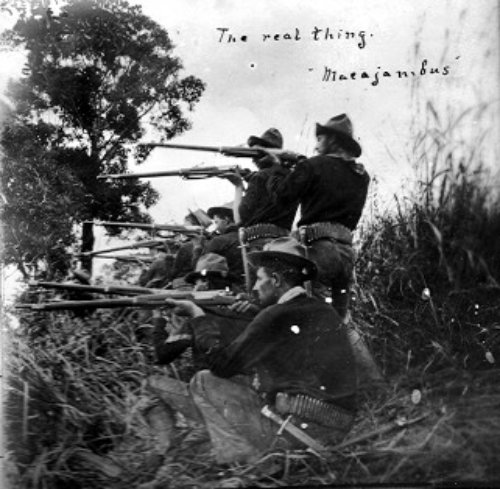
American forces attacking Makahambus, circa 1900s.

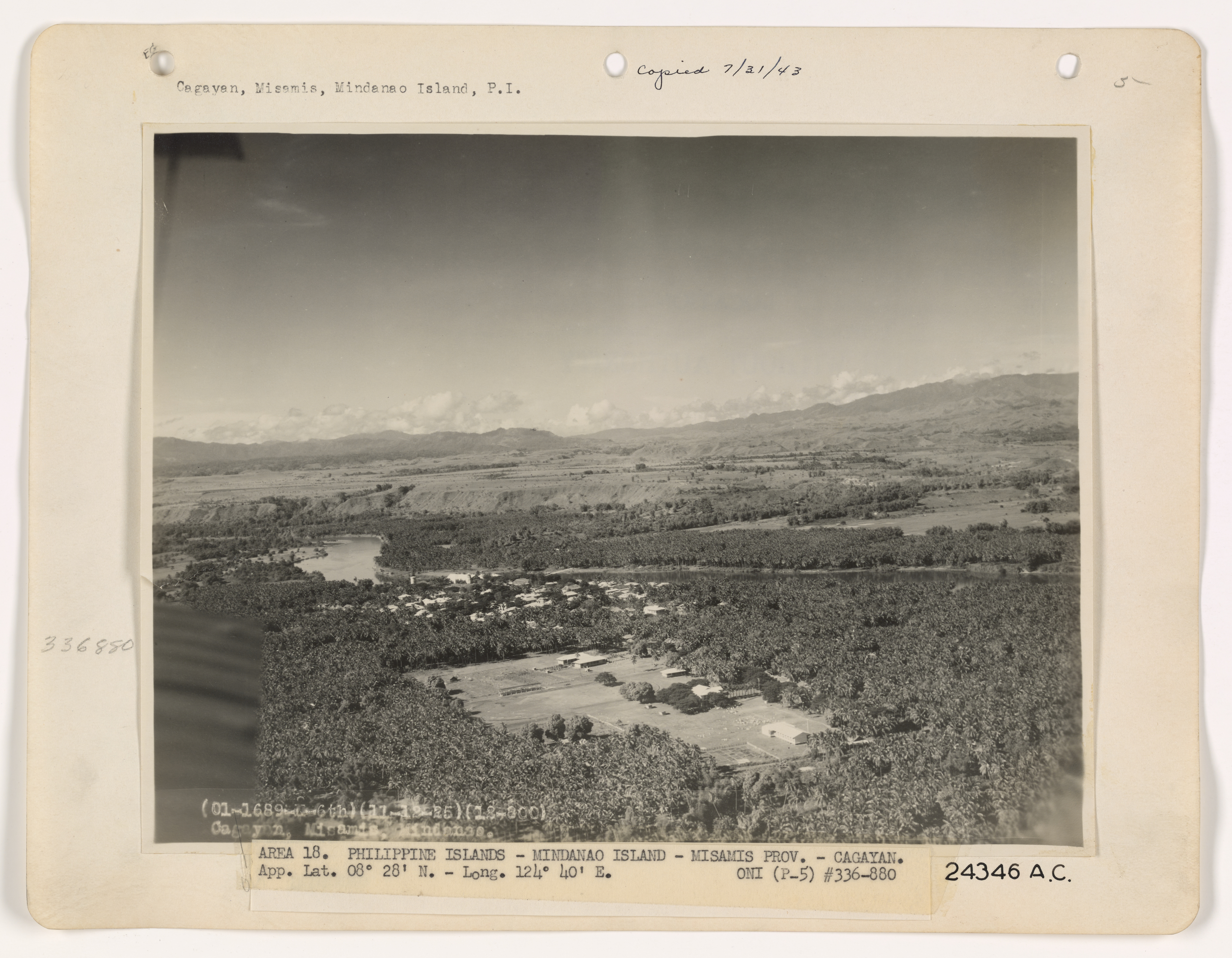
Aerial view of Cagayan de Misamis, 1925

Spain's cession of the Philippines to the United States through a peace treaty in 1898 mainly caused opposition from residents of then Cagayan de Misamis. Their involvement in the Philippine–American War was prompted by the presence of the Americans, who had invaded the municipality on March 31, 1900, and whom they fought against thrice since then.

Resistance fighters lost in the early battles. On April 7, Gen. Nicolas Capistrano led an attack in the town center, on the garrison of the U.S. 40th Infantry Regiment under Col. Edward Godwin, but were repulsed with heavy losses. On May 14, the positions of the 1st Company of El Mindanao Battalion in Agusan Hill was attacked by a military unit under Col. Walter Elliot, with 38 members including their commander, Capt. Vicente Roa, killed.

On June 4, the said battalion, under Col. Apolinar Velez and Lt. Cruz Taal, repulsed the U.S. 35th Regiment during the Battle of Makahambus Hill; marking the Americans' first defeat in the war.

After the troubled years, peace finally brought back the economic activities to normality under the guidance of the United States. Consequently, from a purely farming-fishing area, Cagayan de Oro emerged into a booming commerce and trade center, attracting migrants from Luzon and Visayas to settle in the area.

Americans gave the Philippines its independence on July 4, 1946.

==== Japanese period and second American period ====
On May 3, 1942, American and Philippine forces fought heroically against invading Japanese forces from Panay. Unable to resist the overwhelming and the better supplied Japanese, the allied forces retreated to more defensible positions outside the city. The Japanese burned most of the city and took up residence at the Ateneo de Cagayan University, now Xavier University Grade School and used the ferry crossing near San Agustin Church. In addition, the Japanese also established at least three (likely more) "comfort stations" in the city, where enslaved local girls and teenagers were forced by Japanese soldiers into sexual slavery, which included routine gang-rapes and murders.

The Japanese army implemented a scorch-earth policy. Filipino and American guerrilla forces fought back during this occupation and American planes bombed both the university and San Agustin church on October 10, 1944. The Japanese were never able to successfully move outside the city for any length of time due to the constant pressure and attacks from the Philippine resistant movement. Combined American and Free Philippine forces landed in Cagayan de Oro on May 10, 1945, three years and 7 days after the Japanese occupation.

During this period the Japanese committed many atrocities against the local population of Cagayan de Oro, as they did throughout the Philippines. Colonel Fumio Suzuki and two hundred of his men escaped capture during the liberation of the city and withdrew into the mountainous jungle. They were caught two years later; only 38 survived, by cannibalizing the Higaonon tribal people. At least 70 people were eaten.

A Cagayanon, the physician Antonio Julian Montalvan, was a member of an espionage team working for the return of Gen. Douglas MacArthur to the Philippines. Later, he became part of a Manila spy network. He was captured, tortured and decapitated by the Japanese.

=== Former municipalities as oldest barangays ===
Iponan, Gusa and Agusan, the city's oldest barangays, were once municipalities during the colonial period.

Iponan and Agusan, along with Bayug, Gompot (Balingasag), and Tagoloan, were among the visitas established by the Recollect missionaries in Cagaiang (city's former name) in 1674. The two were under Partido de Cagayan as the then-undivided Misamis was partitioned into four partidos in 1818.

Iponan was made into a separate parish in 1833. The three became visitas of then Cagayan de Misamis, which became the new provincial capital in 1871.

Gusa was established as a barrio in 1771, and shortly, became a municipality. Original settlers were Bukidnons, as well as few Manobos and Moros, who came from barrio Lapasan and town of Cagayan; but the increase of immigrants later resulted in all of the natives leaving the area. At the time of the American occupation, during the Philippine–American War, in 1901, Gen. Nicolas Capistrano chose to meet there twice with the American military officials for a peace conference, held in Julian Gevero's residence, eventually ending the year-long war. However, due to decrease of population following the evacuation of residents during the war, and the town's short distance from Cagayan, Gusa was reverted to a barrio, being part of Agusan.

Agusan became one of the ten barrios of Cagayan in 1844. It was the starting point for those traveling to Bukidnon until the late 1920s. On May 14, 1900, the 1st Company of the Mindanao Battalion perished in a battle against the Americans on the hills near the river. On May 10, 1945, the beaches of Agusan and Bugo were the landing sites of the soldiers of the United States Army's 40th Division, which joined with that of the 31st Division in Bukidnon where they finally defeated the Japanese in a battle.

Iponan (spelled "Yponan" in Spanish colonial records), originally called Kalumpang, was the place where there were streams meeting at one point to form Iponan River which, according to a report of British explorer Thomas Forrest, was considered as among the Mindanao's seven rivers abundant with gold; with a sitio, known for its gold mines, frequently raided by Moros during the Spanish occupation.

Through Act No. 951, issued by the Philippine Commission on October 21, 1903, which reduced the number of municipalities in Misamis from 24 to 10, the territories of Barrio Gusa, along with the towns of Iponan, Opol, Salvador, and Alubijid, joined with Cagayan; while the rest of Agusan joined with Tagoloan. Agusan, later a barrio, along with Bogo and Alae, were transferred from Tagoloan to the newly-converted Cagayan de Oro City in 1950.

=== Postwar era ===
In 1948, the barrios of El Salvador and Molugan with their sitios known as Sala, Sambulawan, Sinaloc, Lagtang, Talaba, Kalabaylabay and Hinigdaan were separated from Cagayan de Oro to form the town of El Salvador.

In 1949, a delegation headed by Cagayan de Misamis mayor Maximo Y. Suniel travelled to Manila to persuade the Philippine Congress to enact a legislative act supporting the creation of the City of Cagayan.

In 1950, the barrios of Opol, Igpit, and Lower Iponan (now Barangay Barra) were separated from Cagayan de Oro to form the town of Opol.

On June 15, 1950, President Elpidio Quirino signed Republic Act No. 521, which granted the status of a chartered city to the Municipality of Cagayan de Misamis. This was made possible through the efforts of then Cagayan de Oro Congressman Emmanuel Pelaez. Suniel was the last municipal mayor of Cagayan de Misamis and the first city mayor of Cagayan de Oro.

=== Martial law era ===
During the martial law era, Cagayan de Oro was not spared from military bombings and the usage of brutal mechanisms against dissenters of the Marcos regime. By the time martial law ended, more than a thousand people from the city had been tortured, raped, electrocuted, or salvaged.

Camp Evangelista in Cagayan de Oro was designated as one of the four provincial camps to become a Regional Command for Detainees (RECAD). It was designated RECAD IV, housing prisoners from throughout Mindanao. Amnesty International called particular attention to the case of Pastor Romeo O. Buenavidez, a United Church of Christ in the Philippines (UCCP) minister, who was beaten up in various safehouses in August 1981 and then brought to Camp Evangelista where he was forced to sign a waiver indicating he had been "well treated" during his "questioning." Results of later medical examinations showed medical findings matching the beatings he described. A case was filed against the officer and soldiers involved but there had been no updates by the time Amnesty International filed its report.

Another detention center in the city, under the administration of Camp Evangelista, was Camp Alagar. One of Camp Alagar's detainees was public school teacher Nicanor Gonzales Jr., who was detained for seven months and heavily tortured, leaving an abnormal growth on his skull. He was eventually honored in 2015 by having his name inscribed at the Philippines' Bantayog ng mga Bayani, which honors the martyrs and heroes who resisted the authoritarian regime.

Cagayan de Oro did not take these human rights abuses of the Marcos dictatorship lightly, and the city came to have a reputation as one of the centers of political opposition in the Philippines.

Cagayan de Oro was declared a highly urbanized city by the Ministry of Local Government on November 22, 1983. In 1986, the city participated in the People Power Revolution through rallies in the streets of the city. When the revolution succeeded and ousted Marcos from power in Manila, the city was among those who supported the installation of Corazon Aquino as president.

=== Later 20th Century ===
On October 4, 1990, the city was seized by a rebel army led by dissident RAM officer Alexander Noble and civilian supporters of the Mindanao Independence Movement led by Reuben Canoy, who marched across the city and took over the regional military garrison at Camp Edilberto Evangelista as part of an attempted coup against President Corazon Aquino. However, Noble's forces failed to gain further support and were isolated by government forces, culminating in Noble's surrender and Canoy's arrest on 6 October.

In 1992, the National Museum of the Philippines recognized the archaeological value of Huluga when it gave the Open Site and caves separate accession numbers. In 1999, however, mayor Vicente Y. Emano conceived the plan to bulldoze Huluga to give way to a road-and-bridge project. The project was stopped in 2001, but was eventually continued in 2002. The construction destroyed at least 60% of the archaeological site's open area, where the majority of artifacts can be found. Protests against the heritage destruction was made by cultural experts, but nothing happened with their plea.

=== Early 21st Century ===
In 2001, the city participated in the Second EDSA Revolution through rallies in the streets of the city. When the revolution succeeded and ousted Estrada from power in Manila, the city was among those that supported the installation of Gloria Macapagal-Arroyo as president.

In 2003, the Heritage Conservation Advocates (HCA) went to the open area of Huluga for a scientific surface investigation and managed to find earthenware, Chinese pottery sherds, obsidian flakes, animal bones, an ancient Spanish coin, and a whale harpoon similar to those being used in Lomblen Island, Indonesia. The newly discovered artifacts proved that there are still many artifacts that can be found in the area. This caused the HCA to file a case against Emano and the contractor, UKC Builders, before the Environmental Management Bureau (EMB). However, the construction continued and was inaugurated in September 2003 by Emano.

A day later, president Gloria Macapagal Arroyo made a speech in UNESCO about her administration's gains in cultural conservation. In January 2004, the city council enacted an ordinance that authorized Emano to sign a contract with the Archaeological Studies Program (ASP) of the University of the Philippines to do salvage archaeology in Huluga and vicinities. The program did not make cooperative linkages with existing archeological programs from Xavier University. The ASP declared that the site was an ancient camp, not a settlement, due to their findings in the destroyed archaeological site. The report did not consider the findings of Xavier University. The issue later climbed into the Philippine Senate, where Loren Legarda issued a resolution for investigation of the matter, but the investigation was never approved by the other members of the Senate. The artifacts found in the Huluga Caves and its destroyed open site from 1992 to 2003 are housed in Xavier University, Capitol University, and the University of the Philippines.

=== Recent history ===
==== Tropical Storm Sendong and subsequent disasters ====
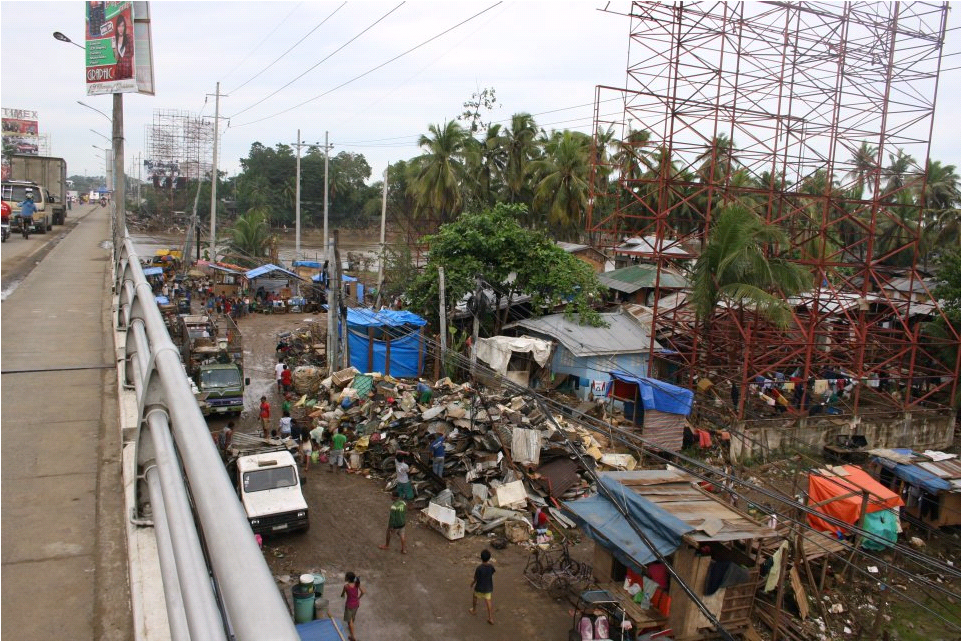
Aftermath of Tropical Storm Sendong (Washi)

On the evening of December 16–17, 2011, Tropical Storm Sendong (international name Washi) caused widespread flash flooding in Northern Mindanao. In Cagayan de Oro, hundreds living near the banks of the Cagayan de Oro River were killed, with hundreds still missing.

Officials said that despite government warning, some people did not evacuate. Five people were killed in a landslide, while others died in the flash floods which occurred overnight, following 10 hours of rain, compounded by overflowing rivers and tributaries. Most of the victims had been sleeping.

In some areas, up to 20 centimeters of rain fell in 24 hours. More than 2,000 were rescued, according to the Armed Forces of the Philippines (AFP), and at least 20,000 people were staying in 10 evacuation centers in Cagayan de Oro. Officials were also investigating reports that an entire village was swept away. The confirmed death toll from the disaster is 1,268. The disaster prompted a shift in settlement patterns in the city, with residents moving away from the areas along the Cagayan River in favor of upland areas.

In January 2017, Cagayan de Oro, along with other parts of Visayas and Mindanao, was impacted by a combination of a low-pressure area and the tail-end of a cold front. The heavy rain inundated many streets, stranding many commuters. At the University of Science and Technology of Southern Philippines (USTP), about 900–1,000 students were trapped as most of their campus was flooded. The students were forced to climb to the upper floors of the school's buildings and wait until rescue arrived. The city's shopping malls on Claro M. Recto Avenue were also severely affected, with Limketkai Center completely inundated by the floodwaters. A basement parking area of a mall at the corner of Corrales St. was covered with water, while another one near Bitan-ag Creek was flooded as well, even though the area was elevated.

On December 21, 2017, Typhoon Vinta (international name Tembin) impacted most of Mindanao. It made its landfall in the Davao Region. Three bridges were closed due to rising water levels in Cagayan de Oro, where 1,719 individuals were forced to evacuate. Roughly 30,000 people were either stranded in ports or stayed in evacuation centers while 22,000 people moved to higher grounds due to heavy flooding.

== Geography ==
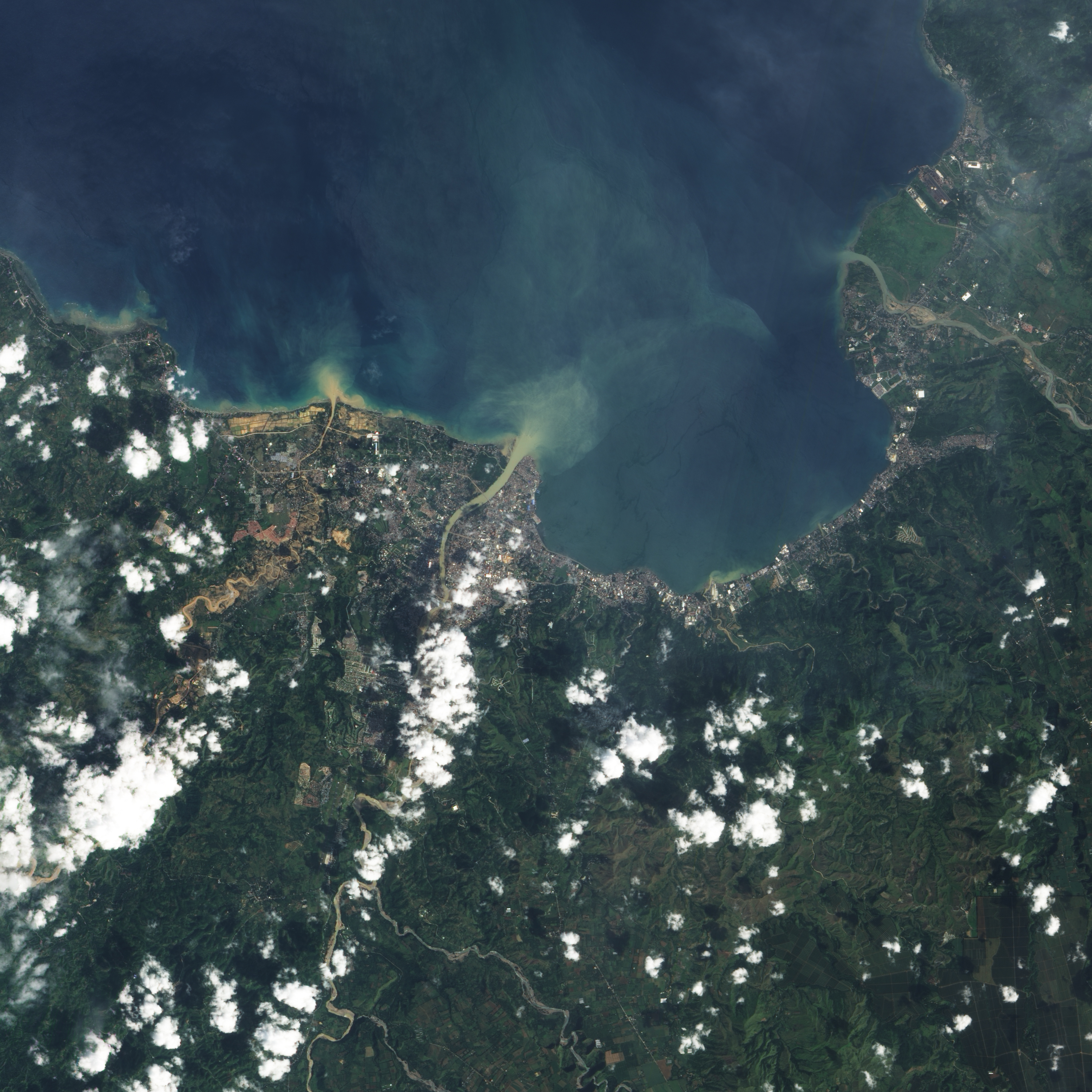
NASA—satellite image captured of Macajalar Bay and the metropolitan area.

Cagayan de Oro is located along the north central coast of Mindanao, the second-largest island in the Philippine archipelago.

Cagayan de Oro is bordered by various municipalities and barangays from neighboring provinces and cities:

- To the south, it shares a boundary with Bubong, Lanao del Sur.
- To the west, it is bordered by Rogongon, a barangay in Iligan City, Lanao del Norte.
- To the east, it is adjacent to the municipalities of Manolo Fortich, Libona, Baungon, and Talakag in Bukidnon's 1st district.
- As the provincial center, Cagayan de Oro serves as a hub for its neighboring municipalities from east to west, though it is governed independently from the province. It is bordered by Tagoloan to the east and Opol to the west.

Its total land area is 488.86 km^{2} representing 13.9% of the entire Misamis Oriental province. It includes 25 kilometers of coastline and a harbor, Macajalar Bay facing the Bohol Sea. Approximately 44.7% of Cagayan de Oro is classified as agricultural land, while 38.4% is classified as open spaces.

=== Barangays ===
Cagayan de Oro is politically subdivided into 80 barangays. Each barangay consists of puroks while some have sitios.

The city is frequently categorized and referenced according to geographic factors: the 1st District (west of the Cagayan River) consisting of 24 barangays which are mostly suburban, and the 2nd District (east of the river), made up of 56 barangays, including city proper barangays numbering from 1–40.

Barangay	Location	Classification	District	Population
Barangay 1	East	Urban	Second District	168
Barangay 2	East	Urban	Second District	50
Barangay 3	East	Urban	Second District	93
Barangay 4	East	Urban	Second District	68
Barangay 5	East	Urban	Second District	34
Barangay 6	East	Urban	Second District	33
Barangay 7	East	Urban	Second District	544
Barangay 8	East	Urban	Second District	90
Barangay 9	East	Urban	Second District	130
Barangay 10	East	Urban	Second District	557
Barangay 11	East	Urban	Second District	162
Barangay 12	East	Urban	Second District	257
Barangay 13	East	Urban	Second District	965
Barangay 14	East	Urban	Second District	351
Barangay 15	East	Urban	Second District	1847
Barangay 16	East	Urban	Second District	25
Barangay 17	East	Urban	Second District	2058
Barangay 18	East	Urban	Second District	1269
Barangay 19	East	Urban	Second District	227
Barangay 20	East	Urban	Second District	80
Barangay 21	East	Urban	Second District	363
Barangay 22	East	Urban	Second District	3324
Barangay 23	East	Urban	Second District	936
Barangay 24	East	Urban	Second District	607
Barangay 25	East	Urban	Second District	661
Barangay 26	East	Urban	Second District	1215
Barangay 27	East	Urban	Second District	1601
Barangay 28	East	Urban	Second District	493
Barangay 29	East	Urban	Second District	476
Barangay 30	East	Urban	Second District	678
Barangay 31	East	Urban	Second District	575
Barangay 32	East	Urban	Second District	792
Barangay 33	East	Urban	Second District	84
Barangay 34	East	Urban	Second District	529
Barangay 35	East	Urban	Second District	2002
Barangay 36	East	Urban	Second District	447
Barangay 37	East	Urban	Second District	181
Barangay 38	East	Urban	Second District	48
Barangay 39	East	Urban	Second District	17
Barangay 40	East	Urban	Second District	339
Agusan	East	Urban	Second District	19039
Balubal	East	Urban	Second District	7013
Bugo	East	Urban	Second District	31229
Camaman-an	East	Urban	Second District	35238
Consolacion	East	Urban	Second District	9396
Cugman	East	Urban	Second District	23468
F. S. Catanico	East	Urban	Second District	2364
Gusa	East	Urban	Second District	28974
Indahag	East	Urban	Second District	17831
Lapasan	East	Urban	Second District	39234
Macabalan	East	Urban	Second District	19562
Macasandig	East	Urban	Second District	23235
Nazareth	East	Urban	Second District	6971
Puerto	East	Urban	Second District	13174
Puntod	East	Urban	Second District	18775
Tablon	East	Urban	Second District	23578
Baikingon	West	Urban	First District	2879
Balulang	West	Urban	First District	42205
Bayabas	West	Urban	First District	13991
Bayanga	West	Urban	First District	3402
Besigan	West	Urban	First District	1700
Bonbon	West	Urban	First District	10976
Bulua	West	Urban	First District	35397
Canito-an	West	Urban	First District	34250
Carmen	West	Urban	First District	77756
Dansolihon	West	Urban	First District	6206
Iponan	West	Urban	First District	27521
Kauswagan	West	Urban	First District	40239
Lumbia	West	Urban	First District	31504
Mambuaya	West	Urban	First District	5963
Pagalungan	West	Urban	First District	2410
Pagatpat	West	Urban	First District	13007
Patag	West	Urban	First District	17941
Pigsag-an	West	Urban	First District	1428
San Simon	West	Urban	First District	1642
Taglimao	West	Urban	First District	1391
Tagpangi	West	Urban	First District	2823
Tignapoloan	West	Urban	First District	5621
Tuburan	West	Urban	First District	1388
Tumpagon	West	Urban	First District	2305

=== Climate ===
Under the Köppen climate classification system, Cagayan de Oro has a tropical monsoon climate (Am) with an annual average temperature of 28 °C. In June 1998, the city recorded its highest temperature to date of 39 °C.

Cagayan de Oro does not receive an even amount of rainfall throughout the year. The driest months are March and April while August and September are the wettest months. The rainy or wet season lasts from June until November with the relatively drier seasons lasting from December until May. The city lies outside the typhoon belt but is affected by the Inter-Tropical Convergence Zone.

Climate data for Cagayan de Oro (Lumbia Airport) 1991–2020, extremes 1979–2020
Month	Jan	Feb	Mar	Apr	May	Jun	Jul	Aug	Sep	Oct	Nov	Dec	Year
Record high °C (°F)	36.2 (97.2)	36.0 (96.8)	37.6 (99.7)	37.0 (98.6)	38.2 (100.8)	38.4 (101.1)	36.2 (97.2)	37.8 (100.0)	36.7 (98.1)	35.2 (95.4)	34.7 (94.5)	34.4 (93.9)	38.4 (101.1)
Mean daily maximum °C (°F)	29.8 (85.6)	30.3 (86.5)	31.4 (88.5)	32.6 (90.7)	33.0 (91.4)	32.1 (89.8)	31.7 (89.1)	32.2 (90.0)	32.1 (89.8)	31.5 (88.7)	31.1 (88.0)	30.4 (86.7)	31.5 (88.7)
Daily mean °C (°F)	25.8 (78.4)	26.0 (78.8)	26.7 (80.1)	27.6 (81.7)	28.1 (82.6)	27.5 (81.5)	27.2 (81.0)	27.4 (81.3)	27.3 (81.1)	27.0 (80.6)	26.7 (80.1)	26.3 (79.3)	27.0 (80.6)
Mean daily minimum °C (°F)	21.7 (71.1)	21.6 (70.9)	21.9 (71.4)	22.7 (72.9)	23.3 (73.9)	22.9 (73.2)	22.6 (72.7)	22.6 (72.7)	22.5 (72.5)	22.4 (72.3)	22.2 (72.0)	22.1 (71.8)	22.4 (72.3)
Record low °C (°F)	16.1 (61.0)	17.1 (62.8)	17.1 (62.8)	18.0 (64.4)	20.7 (69.3)	20.0 (68.0)	20.0 (68.0)	19.4 (66.9)	19.0 (66.2)	19.0 (66.2)	18.0 (64.4)	17.8 (64.0)	16.1 (61.0)
Average rainfall mm (inches)	97.6 (3.84)	85.3 (3.36)	57.6 (2.27)	62.1 (2.44)	128.9 (5.07)	220.1 (8.67)	247.3 (9.74)	197.4 (7.77)	220.8 (8.69)	191.6 (7.54)	127.1 (5.00)	137.5 (5.41)	1,773.3 (69.81)
Average rainy days (≥ 0.1 mm)	10	8	6	6	11	16	17	14	15	14	10	9	136
Average relative humidity (%)	85	84	81	79	80	83	84	82	83	84	84	85	83
Source: PAGASA

== Demographics ==
Population census of Cagayan de Oro
Year	Pop.	±% p.a.
1903	10,937	—
1918	28,062	+6.48%
1939	53,194	+3.09%
1948	54,293	+0.23%
1960	68,274	+1.93%
1970	128,319	+6.51%
1975	165,220	+5.20%
1980	227,312	+6.59%
1990	339,598	+4.10%
1995	428,314	+4.44%
2000	461,877	+1.63%
2010	602,088	+2.69%
2015	675,950	+2.23%
2020	728,402	+1.59%
2024	741,617	+0.43%
Source: Philippine Statistics Authority

According to the 2024 census, it has a population of 741,617 people, making it the 10th most populous city in the Philippines.

About 44% of the household population in Cagayan de Oro classified themselves as ethnically, mixed people, 22.15% as Cebuano, 4.38% as Boholano, while 28.07% as other ethnic groups, including those indigenous people from neighboring towns and provinces such as Higaonons, Manobos, Subanens, as well as Muslim ethnolinguistic groups such as Maranaos, Iranuns, Maguindanaons and Tausugs, and other Christian ethnolinguistic groups such as Bicolanos, Ilocanos, Kapampangans, Pangasinans, and Tagalogs from Luzon and Hiligaynons from Western Visayas(as of 2000 census).

=== Religion ===
==== Roman Catholicism ====
Roman Catholicism is the city's dominant religion, represented by almost 70 percent of the population. It is administered by the Archdiocese of Cagayan de Oro, which comprises the three civil provinces of Misamis Oriental, Bukidnon, and Camiguin in Northern Mindanao, as well as the entire Caraga region. It is a metropolitan seat on the island of Mindanao.

The current Archbishop of Cagayan de Oro is the Most Reverend José Araneta Cabantan, S.S.J.V., D.D., who was installed on August 28, 2020. His seat is located at the Saint Augustine Metropolitan Cathedral.

===== Black Nazarene shrine =====
In 2009, the Minor Basilica of the Black Nazarene in Quiapo, Manila decided to move the replica statue of the Black Nazarene to the Archdiocesan Shrine of the Black Nazarene (Jesus Nazareno Parish Church), located along Claro M. Recto Avenue. This was so that Black Nazarene devotees from Mindanao do not have to travel to Quiapo for their annual pilgrimage. To this day, it hosts the largest traslación parade in all of Mindanao.

In September 2018, the Jesus Nazareno Parish Church underwent year-long physical renovations to make its façade look more like the very basilica in Quiapo itself.

==== Protestant Christianity and Independent Christian denominations ====
Protestant missionary activity in the city started in 1916, although it has grown in numbers over recent decades. One of the known Protestant groups in the city is Pentecostalism, which dramatically increased with 2.8 percent of the total population. About 20 churches have settled in the metropolitan area. Celebration International Church has one of the highest member attendances with a record of 735 members.

In addition, three main Pentecostal mother churches are situated in the suburban area and few in the metropolitan areas. Meanwhile, Adventists, Latter-day Saints, Lutherans, and Methodists have lately grown in numbers within the suburban areas.

Other Christian churches with significant number of adherents include the Iglesia Filipina Independiente, the Iglesia ni Cristo, Members Church of God International, the United Church of Christ in the Philippines, Christ's Commission Fellowship, Victory Christian Fellowship, Baptists, Reformed churches, and the Jesus Miracle Crusade.

==== Islam ====
Islam is practiced mainly by Maranao settlers and the Balik Islam ("reverts") in Cagayan de Oro, mostly belonging to the Sunni sect. Majority of the Muslim population consists of migrants from nearby Iligan and Marawi, where they travel to work, engage in business, and study. It has increased over the years due to conflicts in the Bangsamoro region, most recently the Marawi siege that started on May 23, 2017. Additionally, the city is also home to other sizeable Muslim minorities such as Iranuns, Maguindanaons and Tausugs, as well as Muslim foreign nationals such as Arabs, Pakistanis, and Indonesians.

There are several large mosques and about 50 small mosques that can be found in the city, as well as Muslim prayer rooms or musallahs in some schools, malls, ports of entry, Halal restaurants, and government buildings. Masjid Oro Jammah, located in the corner of Aguinaldo and Domingo Velez streets, is the oldest mosque in the city, founded in 1930. Masjid Sharif Alawi in Barangay Balulang is the largest mosque in Northern Mindanao, with over 3,200 square meters in land area, which also includes a madrasah and community center.

==== Other religions ====
Buddhism and Taoism are practiced by majority of local Chinese. Some are even members of the local chapter of the Bell Church in Barangay Macasandig. Sikhism and Hinduism are practiced by many Indian residents in city. A Sikh gurdwara, the Guru Nanak Indian Temple, is also located in Barangay Macasandig.

=== Languages ===
The Cebuano language is primarily spoken among Cagayanons, with its own dialect that has a distinct vocabulary and dialectal terms not found in standard Cebuano dictionaries and other dialects. Tagalog serves as a secondary language of the city's population. English is mainly used for business and in local academe. Maranao is widely spoken by the city's Muslim community, the majority of which is composed of ethnic Maranaos. Subanen, Binukid, Higaonon, Iranun, Maguindanaon, Tausug, Hiligaynon, Ilocano and Kapampangan are also spoken to varying degrees by their respective ethnic communities within the city. Philippine Hokkien is also used by the local Chinese Filipino community. Indians and their Filipino-born descendants varyingly speak several Indian languages, mainly Hindi and Punjabi, in addition to Cebuano and Tagalog.

== Economy ==
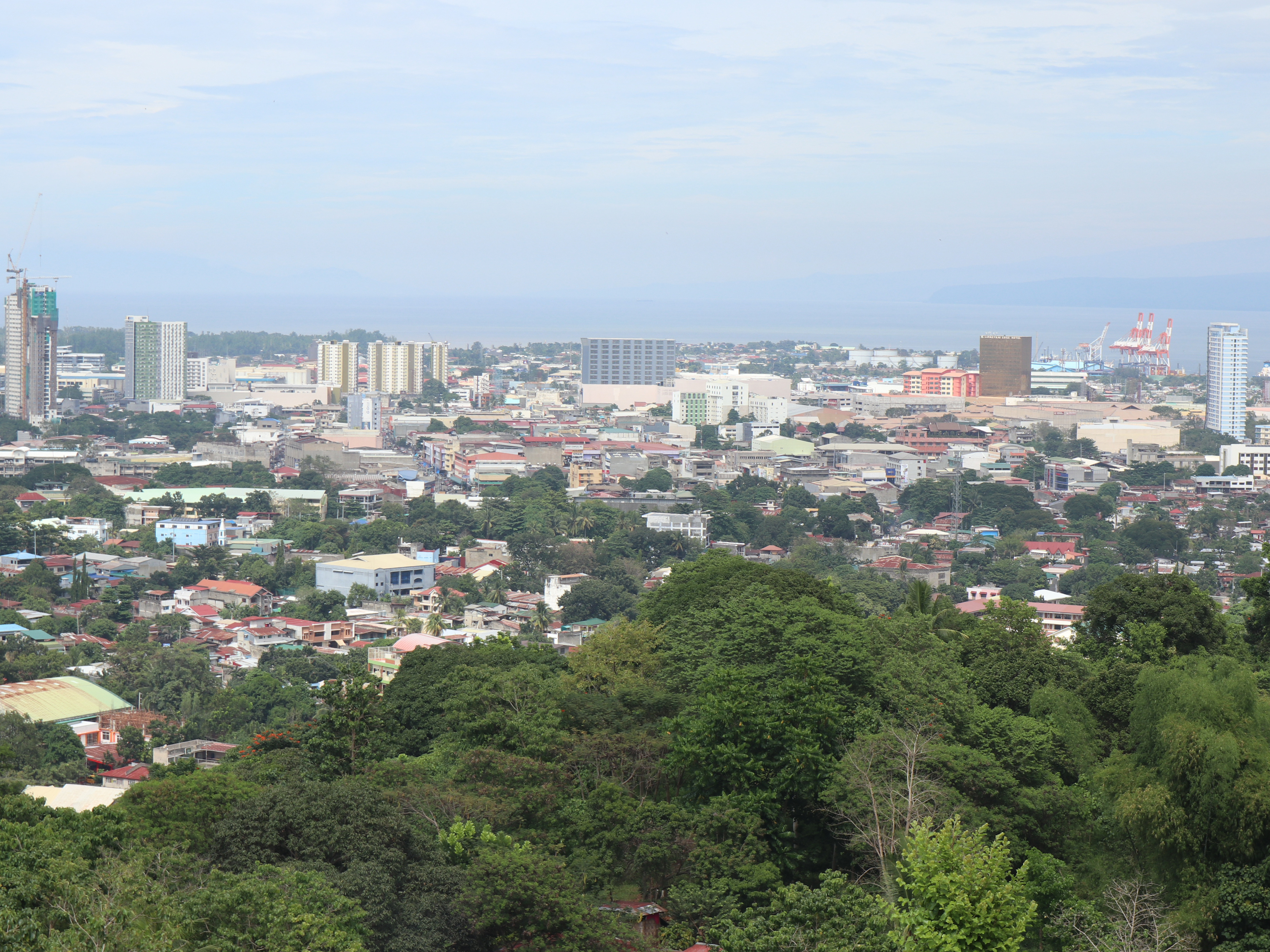
Cagayan de Oro skyline 2021

Poverty incidence of Cagayan de Oro (%)

Source: Philippine Statistics Authority

Cagayan de Oro is the regional center and logistics and business hub of Northern Mindanao. The city's economy is largely based on industry, commerce, trade, service and tourism. Investment in Cagayan de Oro City for the first six months of 2012 reached 7.4 billion pesos outpacing the local government's expectation of to nearly 100 percent. Investments in the city are dominated by malls, high-rise hotels and condominiums and convention centers. The net income for 2012 pegged at PHP 2,041,036,807.89.

It noted the United Nations cited Cagayan de Oro City in 2014 as "emerging city of tomorrow," owing to its strong fundamentals that help strengthen its position as an emerging business leader in Mindanao.

FWD Life Philippines President and CEO Peter Grimes said that Cagayan de Oro City is emerging as the economic and financial center of Mindanao due to the city's conducive peace and order conditions, stable power supply, readily available and well-trained human resources, efficient governance and appropriate infrastructure.

Cagayan de Oro is home of the multi-billion peso fuel import facility of Pilipinas Shell Petroleum Corporation, dubbed as the North Mindanao Import Facility (NMIF).

In 2018, during the 6th Regional Competitiveness Summit organized by the Department of Trade and Industry, Cagayan de Oro was named as the country's "Top 5 Most Competitive City" in the highly urbanized cities category, notching five ranks higher as compared to its overall ranking last year outranking the country's top financial center, Makati, which ranked sixth.

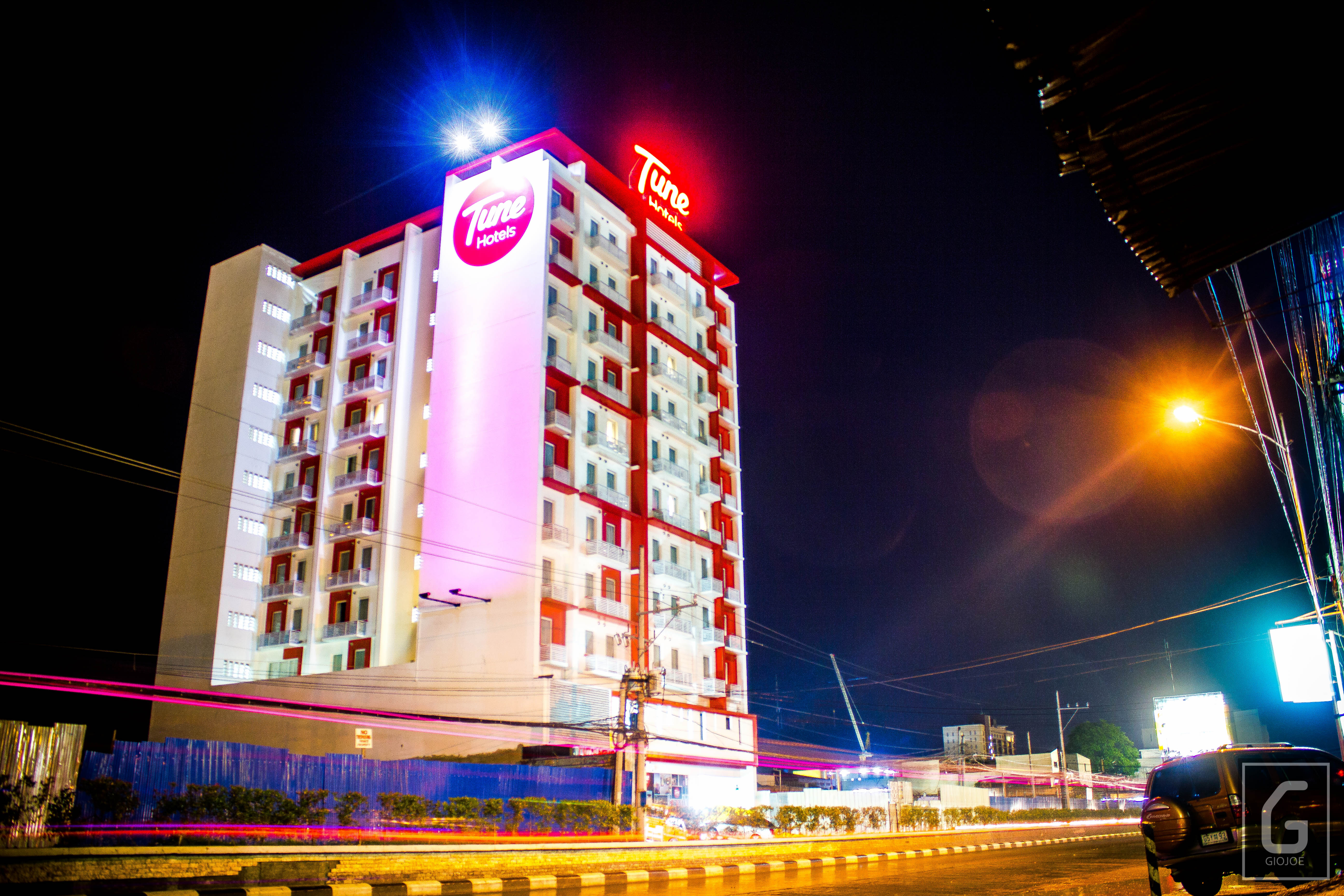
International hotel chain Tune Hotels along CM Recto Avenue

=== Big industries and homegrown industries ===
Cagayan de Oro is the home of multinational companies, like Del Monte, Nestle, Liwayway Marketing Corporation (goes by a more well-known name, Oishi), Unipace Corporation (a multi-national company carrying the Gaisano Group), Philip Morris Fortune Tobacco Inc. (PMFTC), Madison Shopping and Supervalue, Inc. (runs all SM Malls and Savemore Supermarkets and also into heavy manufacturing and distribution).

=== Bank industry ===
Cagayan de Oro, as the regional economic center of Northern Mindanao, houses the Cagayan de Oro Branch of the Bangko Sentral ng Pilipinas (Central Bank of the Philippines). As of December 2019, at least 143 banks are operating in the city.

=== Retail industry ===
Limketkai Center, which has two shopping malls (Limketkai M & Robinsons CDO Mall), hosts many flagship tenants which include two supermarket branches.

=== Business process outsourcing ===
Business process outsourcing (BPO) in Cagayan de Oro is booming due to ample supply of human capital supported by available health, research, educational, and modern telecommunication facilities. The increase of BPO companies in the city has led to new buildings and zones dedicated for contact centers which are all PEZA registered.

=== Cooperative business ===
Cagayan de Oro is home to cooperatives that provide employment, economic assistance, and considered one of the prime drivers of the city's economy. The extension office of Cooperative Development Authority, located in the city as the center of Northern Mindanao (Region X), provides technical advisory services, regulatory services, and online application processing.

The big names of Cooperatives located in Cagayan de Oro are:

- Philippine Federation of Credit Cooperatives Mindanao League – a federation of cooperatives in the Philippines
- MASS-SPECC Cooperative Development Center – a federation of cooperatives in the Philippines
- First Community Cooperative (FICCO – formerly Ateneo Community Credit Union) – a billionaire cooperative covering the entire of Mindanao
- Oro Integrated Cooperative – consisting of more than 100,000 strong members of farmers, fisher folk, women, workers, vendors, drivers, government employees scattered in Cagayan de Oro and the provinces of Misamis Oriental, Bukidnon and Tagbilaran City who are engaged in small and micro enterprises
- ACDI Multipurpose Cooperative – preferred brand of financial services in the Armed Forces of the Philippines
- Asian Business Cabletow Cooperative Academy (ABCCA) – provides access to and quality of education for the less-privileged students
- CFI Community Cooperative
- Coop-Life Mutual Benefit Services (CLIMBS Life and General Insurance Cooperative) – owned by over 2000 cooperatives in the Philippines since 1971
- Oro Savings & Sharing Cooperative
- Cooperative Bank of Misamis Oriental – with 268 cooperatives and Samahang Nayon as member-incorporators

== Government ==
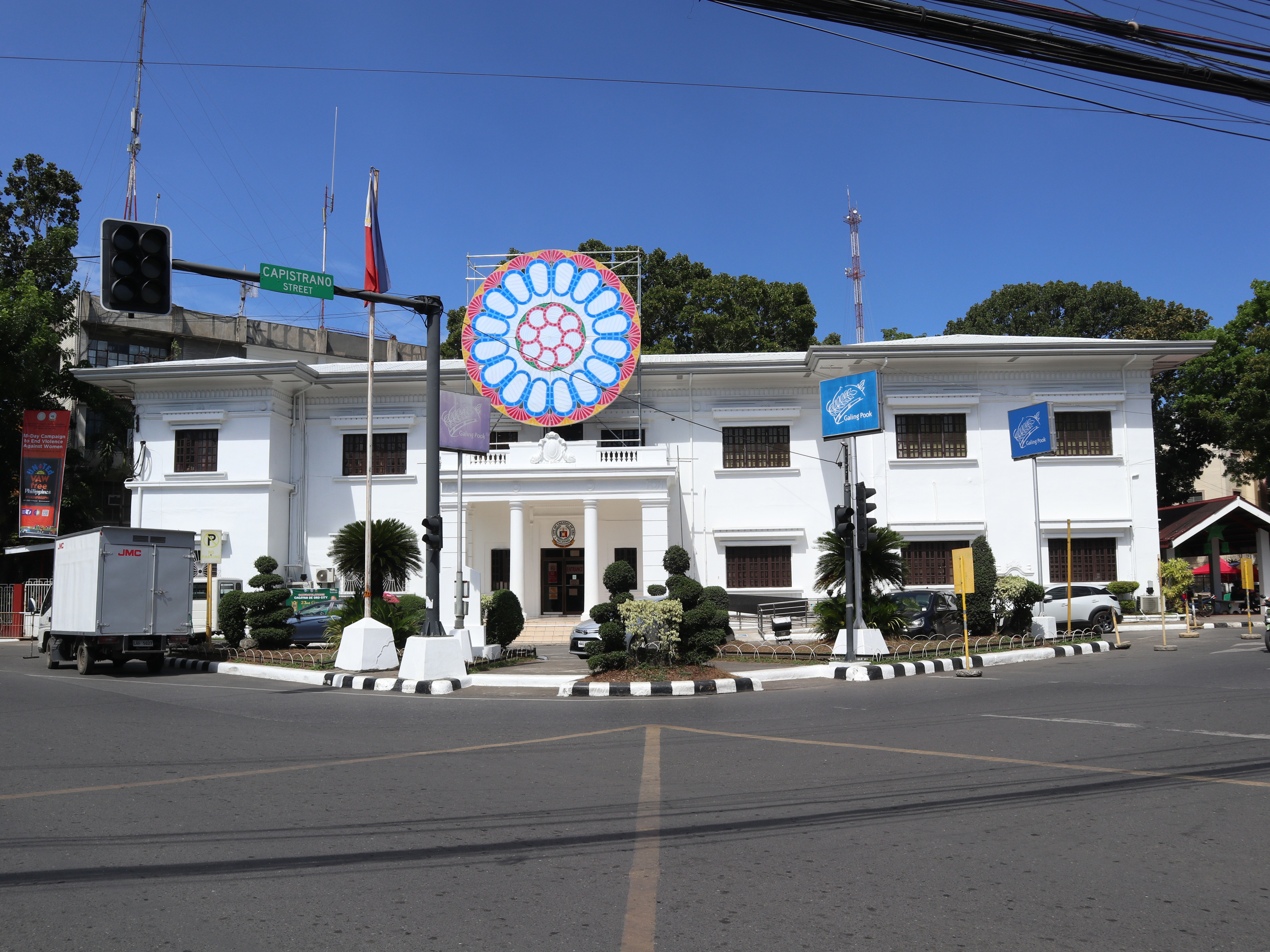
City Hall

The seal of Cagayan de Oro when it attained its cityhood in 1950 and was replaced in 1976. The 1976 seal was revised in 1990 to reflect the status of the city as a highly urbanized city independent of the province, but it was later replaced on the 50th anniversary of cityhood in 2000 with a newer seal. In 2014, the 1990 seal was readopted contrary to recommendations of local historians to readopt the 1950 seal which was recognized as the seal of the city by NHCP. The non-registration of the 1990 seal to NHCP left its legality open to question.

Elected and appointed public officials have governed Cagayan de Oro since June 15, 1950, with a strong mayor-council government. The city political government is composed of the mayor, vice mayor, two congressional districts representatives, sixteen councilors, one Sangguniang Kabataan (SK) Federation representative and an Association of Barangay Captains (ABC) representative. Each official is elected publicly to a three-year terms.

The following are the current city officials of Cagayan de Oro:

- House of Representatives
1. 1st Legislative district: Rep. Lordan G. Suan (Padayon Pilipino)
2. 2nd Legislative district: Rep. Rufus B. Rodriguez (CDP)
- Mayor: Rolando A. Uy (NUP)
- Vice Mayor: Jocelyn B. Rodriguez (CDP)

=== Barangays and legislative districts ===
Cagayan de Oro is politically subdivided into 80 barangays. These are grouped into two congressional districts, 24 barangays in the 1st district (West) and 56 barangays in the 2nd district (East), with the Cagayan de Oro River as the natural boundary. The city has a 57 urbanized barangays and 23 rural barangays all in all.

Map of the barangays of Cagayan de Oro

District	Sub-District (# of Barangays)	Population (as of 2024)	Barangays
1st	Non-Poblacion (24)	427,513	Baikingon; Balulang; Bayabas; Bayanga; Besigan; Bonbon; Bulua; Canito-an; Carmen; Dansolihon; Iponan; Kauswagan; Lumbia; Mambuaya; Pagalungan; Pagatpat; Patag; Pigsag-an; San Simon; Taglimao; Tagpangi; Tignapoloan; Tuburan; Tumpagon
2nd	Non-Poblacion (16)	314,104	Agusan; Balubal; Bugo; Camaman-an; Consolacion; Cugman; F.S. Catanico; Gusa; Indahag; Lapasan; Macabalan; Macasandig; Nazareth; Puerto; Puntod; Tablon
2nd	Poblacion (40)	314,104	Barangay 1; Barangay 2; Barangay 3; Barangay 4; Barangay 5; Barangay 6; Barangay 7; Barangay 8; Barangay 9; Barangay 10; Barangay 11; Barangay 12; Barangay 13; Barangay 14; Barangay 15; Barangay 16; Barangay 17; Barangay 18; Barangay 19; Barangay 20; Barangay 21; Barangay 22; Barangay 23; Barangay 24; Barangay 25; Barangay 26; Barangay 27; Barangay 28; Barangay 29; Barangay 30; Barangay 31; Barangay 32; Barangay 33; Barangay 34; Barangay 35; Barangay 36; Barangay 37; Barangay 38; Barangay 39; Barangay 40

== Culture and arts ==
There are several notable events in the city. Each barangay or barrio has its own feast locally known as Fiesta (or festivals) honoring their patron saints after achieving recognition in their own rights.

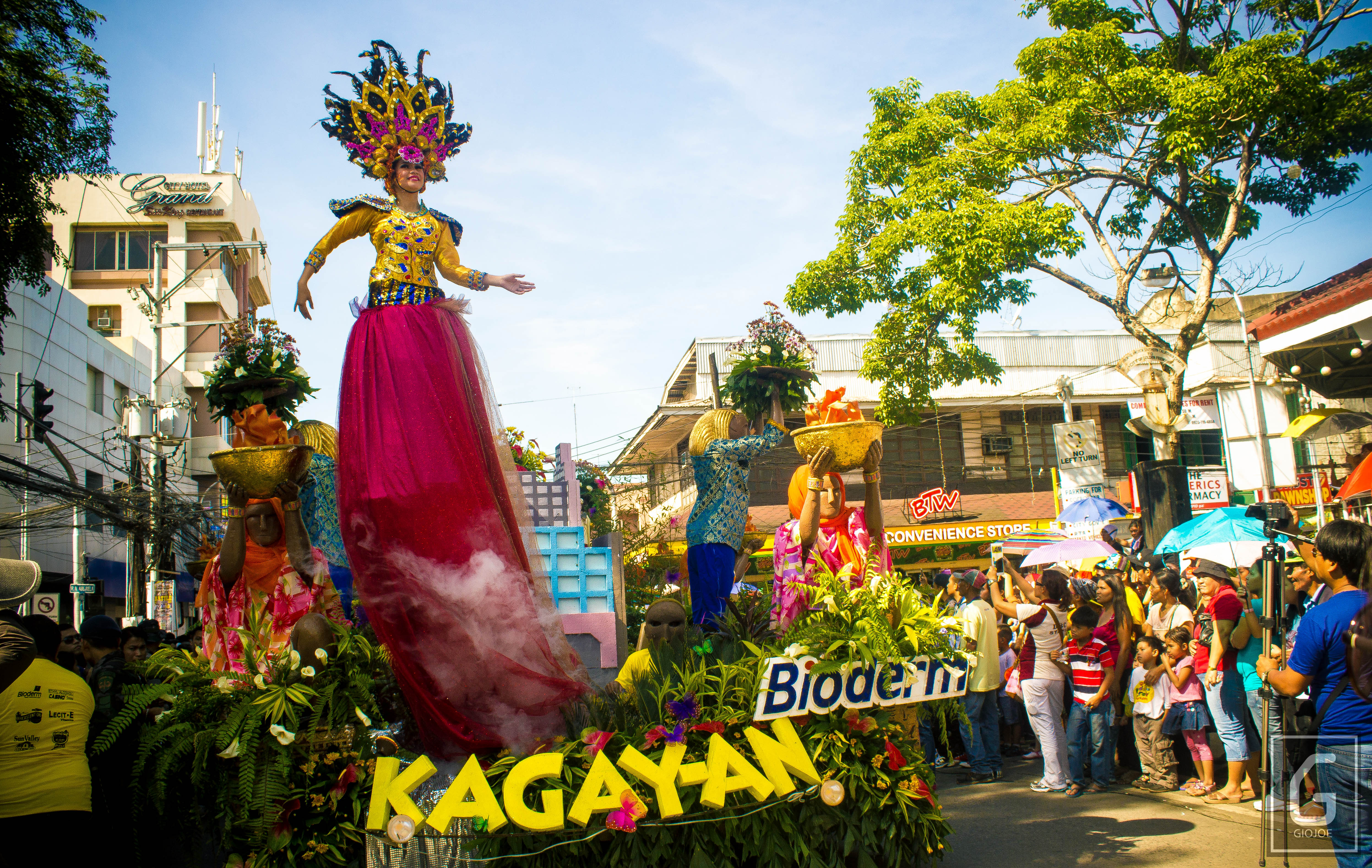
During the Higalaay (Kagay-an Festival) 2014

The Higalaay Festival (formerly the Kagay-an Festival, then the Higalaay Kagay-an Festival) is a week-long celebration in honor of Cagayan de Oro's patron saint St. Augustine held every August.

Highlights of the Higalaay Festival are the Kahimunan Trade Fair, which features the native products of the city and province, particularly agricultural, Miss Cagayan de Oro, Folkloric Street Dancing Competition featuring colorful attires and cultural dances of the Higaonon tribes, Higalas Parade of Cagayan de Oro Icons and Floats, Halad sa Lambagohan, PE Rhythmic Dance Competition, Kalo Festival and Kumbira, a culinary show and exhibit that started in 1996 by Kagay-anons hoteliers and restaurants. It has since evolved over the years and now hosts a culinary competition among students and professionals from all over Mindanao. The competition is divided into students and professionals where hotel and restaurant management schools and professional chefs compete against each other in their respective categories. There are also cultural shows, competitions and celebrity concerts. In more recent years, some of these competitions have been replaced with new ones, such as the Folkloric Street Dancing Competition, which was replaced by the Cagayan de Oro Carnival Parade in 2014.

The Pasko de Oro festival of December 2023 after the August Higalaay Festival is hosted at the 2.5-kilometer two-lane Rio de Oro Boulevard along the Cagayan de Oro River, which was declared a major tourist attraction. The festival features the dragon boat racing, street dancing competition, fluvial religious procession, agro fair, photo contest, cowboy rodeo festival and trade fair.

The annual religious tradition of the Feast of the Black Nazarene in Cagayan de Oro City is held every January 9 by having a procession called "Traslacion" in which hundreds of thousands of devotees participate. Cagayan de Oro is one of only three sites in the country to have this 'Traslacion'.

"Himugso", which means birth, is a week-long celebration of Cagayan de Oro's Charter Day and Philippine Independence Day. Cagayan de Oro's cityhood was established on June 15, 1950. Independence Day is the national commemoration of the Philippine Declaration of Independence from Spain on June 12, 1898. Both Charter Day and Independence day are non-working holidays and a roster of special activities is lined up annually to mark the dual special occasion.

RODELSA Hall, operated by Liceo de Cagayan University, serves as a center for the performing arts. Concerts of many genres have been performed at RODELSA. Cine Europa (films) featuring European Union's cultures which include Austria, Belgium, Bulgaria, Czech Republic, Denmark, Finland, France, Germany, Hungary, Italy, Netherlands, Norway, Poland, Romania were shown at RODELSA.

Xavier Center for Culture and the Arts (XCCA), part of Xavier University - Ateneo de Cagayan, commissions and hosts culture and arts programs (Filipino and foreign, classical and contemporary).

In addition, the city is also the birthplace of Kadaiyahan festival, which claimed to be the first Mindanao-wide Pride March. Mindanao Pride, an emerging social movement that advocates for lesbian, gay, bisexual, transgender, and queer (LGBTQ+) rights and welfare in the island's regions. Kadaiyahan is the Visayan word for diversity and the lesbian, gay, bisexual, transgender, queer and intersex (LGBTQI) community. The LGBTQI are at the forefront of fighting for acceptance, not just tolerance in Philippine society.

=== Cuisine ===
Cagayan de Oro food cultures include a variety of world cuisines influenced by the city's immigrant history. Western and Austronesian immigrants have made the city famous for pastel bread, chicharrón and Hamon de Cagayan. Some mobile food vendors licensed by the city sell street food like kwek-kwek, fish balls, tempura, proven (made from chicken proventriculus), and grilled meat.

Cagayan de Oro has local, national, and foreign owned restaurants (Chinese and Korean cuisines), eateries, fast-foods, snack bars, bakeshops, and coffee shops that sprout all over the city.

=== Sports ===
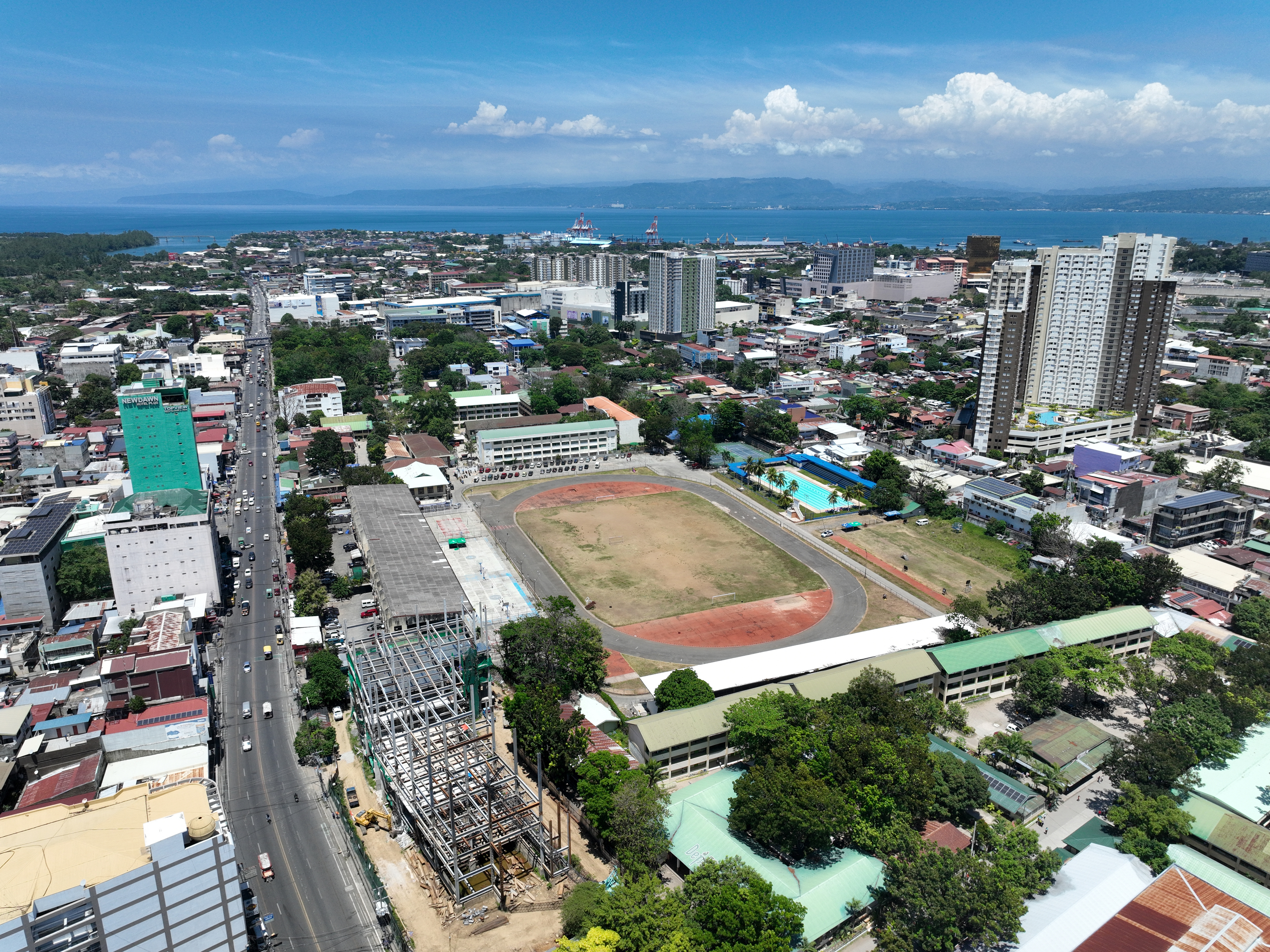
Pelaéz Sports Complex.

Cagayan de Oro is the home of the Cagayan de Oro Stars and Cagayan de Oro Rapids basketball teams. This major teams of the city is member community of Mindanao Visayas Basketball Association, an amateur commercial basketball league in southern Philippines sanctioned by the country's National Sports Association for basketball, the Samahang Basketbol ng Pilipinas (SBP). It is also the home of "Holcim MoneyGram-Misamis Oriental" and "Holcim Pryce Pharma", which commencing the Misamis Oriental province. Aside from basketball, Cagayan de Oro is known for its oldest lawn tennis clubs like the "Golden Friendship Tennis Club". In addition, the city is ornamented with amateur volleyball teams like the Xavier University Volleyball Team.

The city was known for its leading sport, chess, one of the most common recreations by continuing championships in Mindanao since the 1990s. White water rafting and kayaking have annual sport events through the Cagayan River.

Sport venues include one of the biggest sports complex in Mindanao the Pelaez Memorial Sports Center, Xavier University-Ateneo de Cagayan Gymnasium, Liceo Civic Center, University of Science and Technology in Southern Philippine Gymnasium and others, a sports and entertainment complex that also hosts concerts. The Pelaez Memorial Sports Center serves as the home complex of Misamis Oriental sports teams.

Cagayan de Oro's new indoor sport is go-karting. The Speed Master Go Kart Race Track at SM City Carpark Building was the first race track in the city and in Mindanao. F1 Go Karts will be the second facility of its kind in the city and the first to use electric cars.

Cagayan de Oro is home to Pueblo de Oro Golf and Country Club, the cities only championship golf course. The Robert Trent Jones Jr. design stretches out to 7,000 yards from the championship tees, but has numerous tees for all skill levels. PDOGCC has also hosted premier professional golf events, most recently the 2019 ICTSI Pueblo de Oro Championship on the Philippines Golf Tour.

== Infrastructure ==
=== Transportation ===
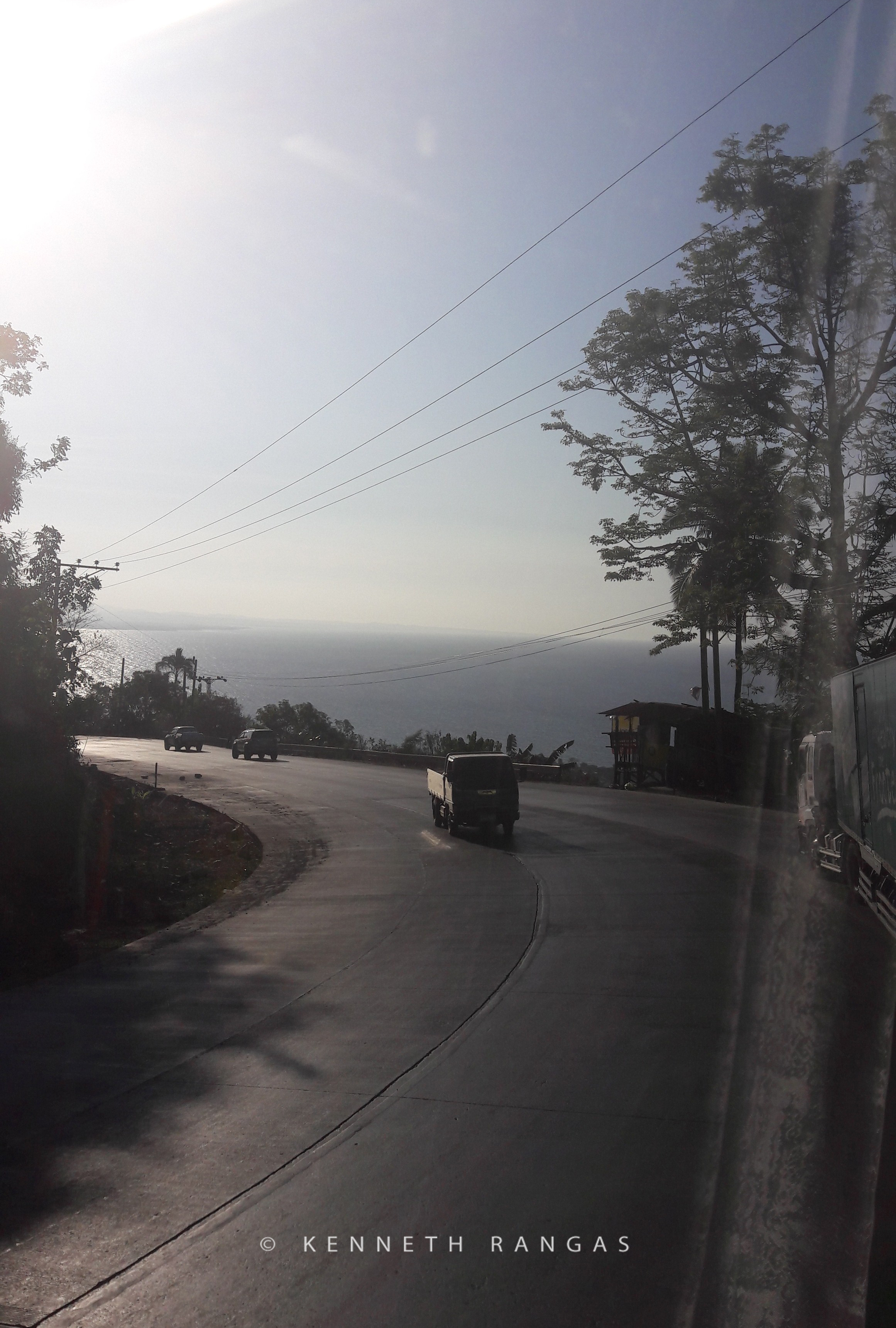
Sayre Highway in upland Barangay Puerto connecting the city to the province of Bukidnon

As the gateway to Northern Mindanao and the rest of Mindanao, Cagayan de Oro is accessible via land, air and water transportation. Main public transportation systems within the city are metered taxis, jeepneys with fixed routes, and motorelas within the city. There have also been new additions of transportation such as trisikads(pedicabs), which can transport people within close ranges at an affordable rate (roughly 10 PHP or 16 cents in US dollars.). Vans have also been a new mode of transport which can take people outside of the city towards places like the Laguindingan airport, and other further places. In some areas of the city there are motorcycles that could take you to the much harder to get parts such as the mountainous areas.

==== Ports ====
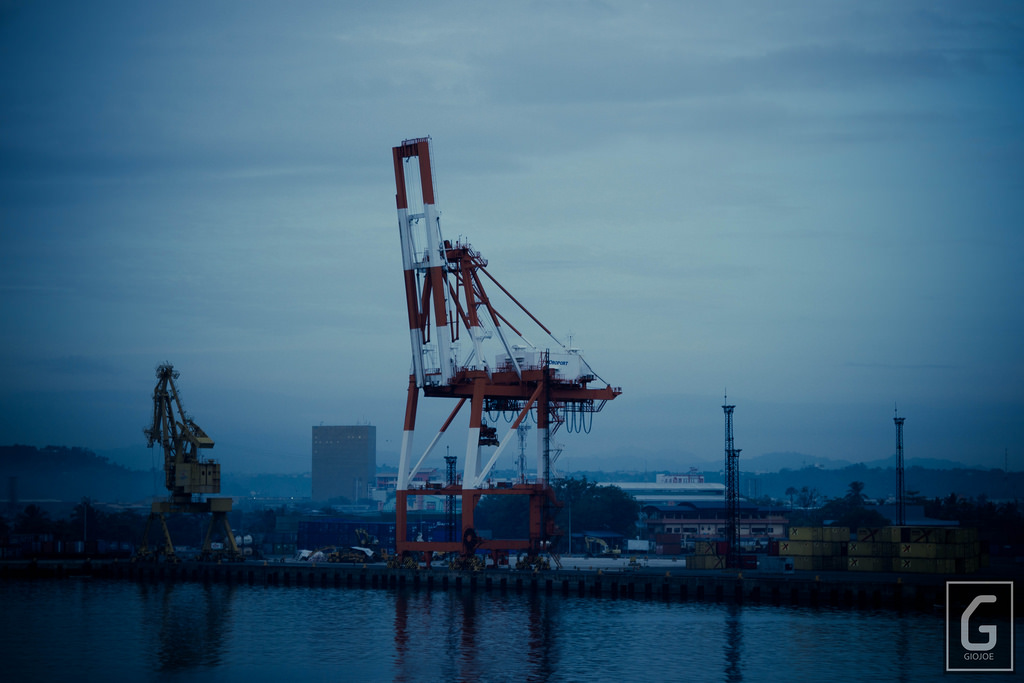
Port of Cagayan de Oro, one of the busiest ports in Mindanao

The Port of Cagayan de Oro in Macabalan is located near the estuary of the Cagayan de Oro River. It has an anchorage depth of 18 meters (59 ft) and is around 400 meters (1,300 ft) from the shoreline. It has four large gantry cranes and the biggest international and domestic seaport in Mindanao. It handled 1.399 million metric tons (1,377,000 long tons; 1,542,000 short tons) of cargoes during the first quarter of 2016 to rank 3rd in the country after Manila's North Harbor with 5.577 million metric tons (5,489,000 long tons; 6,148,000 short tons) and Manila International Container Terminal (MICT) with 3.746 million metric tons (3,687,000 long tons; 4,129,000 short tons). The Port of Cagayan de Oro increased its volume of cargoes by 9.7% from 2015. This is according to data from the Philippine Ports Authority (PPA).

The Port of Cagayan de Oro (Macabalan Port) serves regular trips to and from cities of

General Milling and Del Monte Philippines also operate their own port facilities within Cagayan de Oro. The $85 million Mindanao International Container Port located in nearby town Tagoloan 17 kilometers (11 mi) from Cagayan de Oro serves the PHIVIDEC Industrial Estate. This city's sub-port connects Mindanao to the ports of major cities in Visayas, Batangas, Metro Manila and the rest of the world.

==== Airport ====
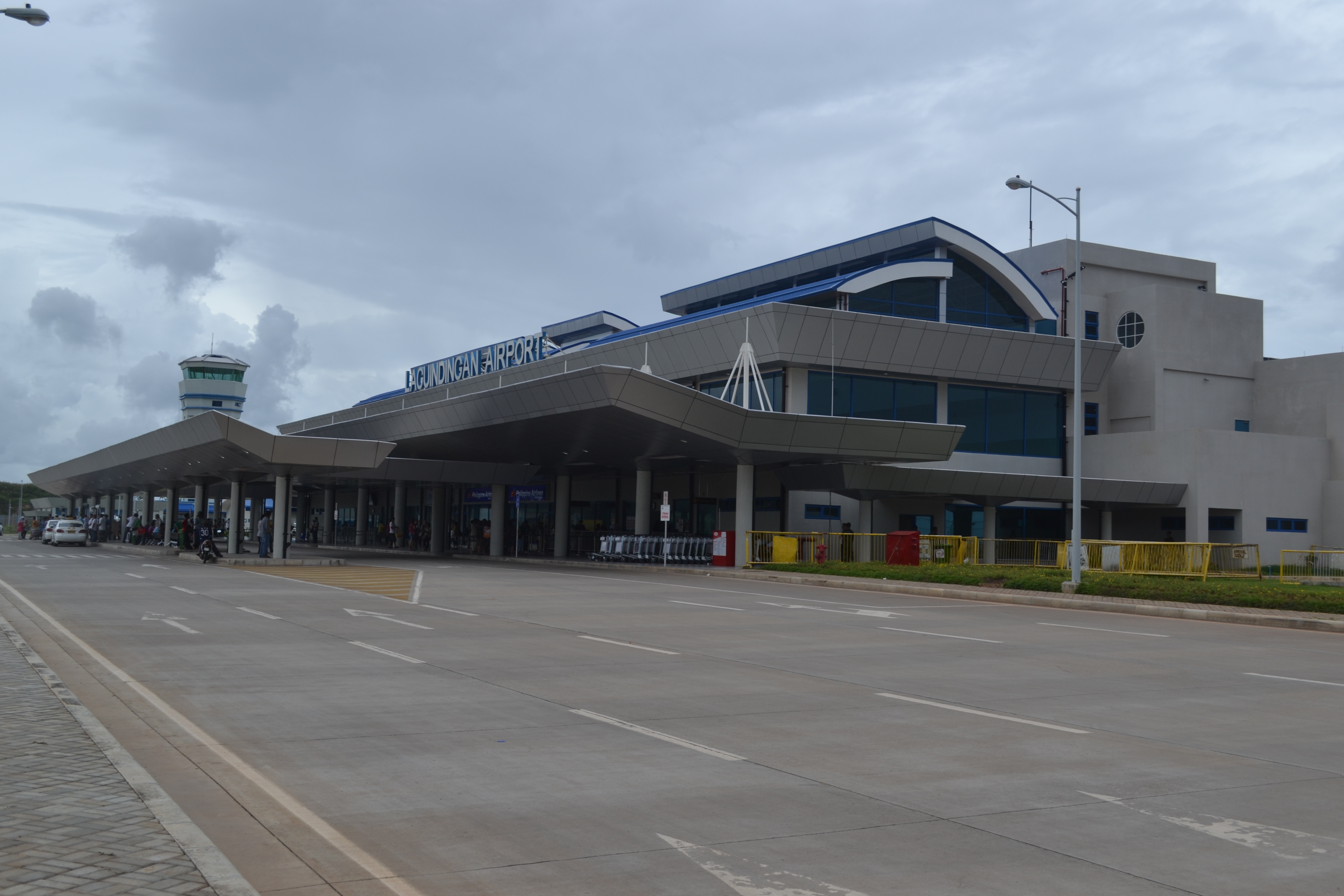
Laguindingan Airport

Cagayan de Oro's Laguindingan Airport (CGY), declared recently as the 7th hub of Cebu Pacific Airlines, handles domestic flights to and from Davao City. It will serve international flights in the future. It sits on a 4.17 square kilometers (1.61 sq mi) site in Barangay Moog, Laguindingan, some 46 kilometers (29 mi) northwest of Cagayan de Oro. The airport was inaugurated on January 11, 2006, by then President Gloria Macapagal Arroyo, who advocated the idea of an international airport along the Cagayan de Oro-Iligan Corridor, and was officially opened on June 15, 2013.

Laguindingan Airport is accessible by various modes of transportation provided by several transport operators from CDO and vice versa. These are ALPHAT Airport metered yellow taxi, regular metered taxi, and several shuttle express vans that run on an hourly basis (Magnum Express with its terminal at Limketkai Center, LAX Shuttle with its terminal at Ayala Centrio, Odyssey Airport Express with its terminal at SM CDO Downtown Premier, CAGATRANSCO, Glorymer Transport, Donsals Express, JTS, The Lord's Transport Services, Europcar, Super 5, CDOTRANSCO, Numano Express). All have booths near the parking area at Laguindingan Airport.

In 2019, the Civil Aviation Authority of the Philippines (CAAP) has granted Original Proponent Status (OPS) to Aboitiz InfraCapital, Inc. for its unsolicited proposal for the upgrade, expansion, operations, and maintenance of the Laguindingan Airport in Misamis Oriental. The ₱42.7 billion project involves capacity augmentation through expansion or construction of new passenger terminals, installation of required equipment, and enhancement and development of airside facilities.

==== Bus terminals ====
There are two bus terminals in the city: The Eastbound Integrated Bus Terminal also known as Market City and The Westbound Integrate Bus and Jeepney Terminal.

The Eastbound Integrated Bus Terminal (Agora) also known as Market City offers regular landtrips to and from eastern municipalities of Misamis Oriental, Bukidnon and Agusan del Norte.

The Westbound Integrated Bus and Jeepney Terminal also has regular land trips to and from western municipalities of Misamis Oriental and Lanao del Norte.

=== Public utilities ===
Water services are provided by the Cagayan de Oro Water District (COWD), the first water district established in the entire Philippines. The Bulk Water Supply, a supply agreement between COWD and the contractor, has a total production capacity of 198,262 cubic metres per day, and comes from treated water from Cagayan de Oro river, the main water source of the city.

Electricity in the city is provided mainly by Cagayan Electric Power and Light Company (CEPALCO) and partly by Misamis Oriental 1st Rural Electric Service Cooperative (MORESCO-1). Cagayan Electric Power and Light Company (CEPALCO). CEPALCO, which began operations in 1952, covers almost all of Cagayan de Oro and the municipalities of Tagoloan, Villanueva and Jasaan, all in the province of Misamis Oriental, including the 3,000-hectare PHIVIDEC Industrial Estate and caters to more than 100,000 consumers. The company's distribution system network includes 138,000 volt, 69,000 volt, 34,500 volt and 13,800 volt systems. CEPALCO's power supply is mainly coming from embedded power generators, namely: 165MW-Coal Power Plant of Minergy Power Corporation in Balingasag, 46MW-Diesel Power Plants of Minergy in Tablon, 8MW-Cabulig Hydro Electric Power Plant in Claveria, 7MW-Bubunawan Hydro Power Plant in Baungon-Libona, Bukidnon, 12.5MW Kirahon Solar Power Plant in Villanueva. CEPALCO is also operating the Developing World's first and largest (at the time of its inauguration in 2004) on-grid solar photovoltaic power plant. The 1-megawatt polycrystalline silicon-based photovoltaic (PV) plant in Barangay Indahag of this city is connected with the distribution network of CEPALCO. It is the biggest solar power plant connected to the power grid in Southeast Asia. Misamis Oriental −1 Rural Electric Service Cooperative (MORESCO-1) whose office is located in Laguindingan covers remote parts of Cagayan de Oro. These are barangays Canitoan, Pagatpat, San Simon, and Baikingon.

Telecommunications are provided by PLDT, Philcom, Misortel, Globe, Smart, and Sun.

== Law and order ==
Insignia of PNP Cagayan de Oro City Police Office

Cagayan de Oro is the regional base of the Philippine Air Force, Philippine Army, and Philippine National Police in Northern Mindanao. Lumbia Airport is currently used as an air base, operating service equipment such as OV-10 Bronco aircraft, UH-1 Huey, and MD-520MG Defender helicopters. The 15th Air Strike Wing from Sangley Point, Cavite will be moved to Lumbia Airport.

The Philippine Army operates the largest military camp in Mindanao located in Barangay Patag with an area of 129 hectares. Camp Evangelista is home to the 4th infantry division of the Philippine Army. The camp's external jurisdiction covers the Northern Mindanao and Caraga regions. Minor military camps are also located in Barangay Lumbia and Upper Puerto.

The Philippine National Police (PNP) operates its Regional Headquarters at Camp Alagar in Barangay Lapasan. Camp Alagar has jurisdiction over the entirety of Northern Mindanao, namely the provinces of Bukidnon, Camiguin, Lanao del Norte, Misamis Occidental and Misamis Oriental including its major cities; Cagayan de Oro and Iligan. The PNP and AFP, with the help of Cagayan de Oro's local government unit formed a new integrated security force named Task Force Oro.

Cagayan de Oro upgraded its emergency services on October 30, 2017. Dialing the 911 will immediately link the call to CDRRMC, utilizing computer-aided emergency response. The city patterned its improved emergency response program after Davao City's central 911 emergency call.

The Judiciary's Court of Appeals holds office in Cagayan de Oro. The Court of Appeals of the Philippines is the Philippines' second-highest judicial court. Cagayan de Oro's Court of Appeals has 3 divisions covering all of Mindanao.

== Health ==
Cagayan de Oro has a hospital bed-to-population ratio of 1:474 as of 2003. The Justiniano R. Borja General Hospital (a.k.a. City Hospital), the Camp Evangelista Station Hospital (Phil. Army), and Northern Mindanao Medical Center (formerly Provincial Hospital) are the three government-run hospitals.

Capitol University Medical City, Polymedic General Hospital, Polymedic Medical Plaza, Maria Reyna–Xavier University Hospital, Cagayan de Oro Medical Center, Madonna and Child Hospital, Sabal Hospital, Puerto Community Hospital, and Maternity-Children's Hospital and Puericulture Center (formerly Oro Doctor's Hospital) are privately owned.

A special medical facility for drug-abuse treatment and rehabilitation is the Department of Health-Treatment and Rehabilitation Center-Cagayan de Oro located at Upper Puerto, Barangay Puerto.

Many of these government-owned and privately owned hospital facilities have undergone expansion, renovation and modernization.

== Education ==
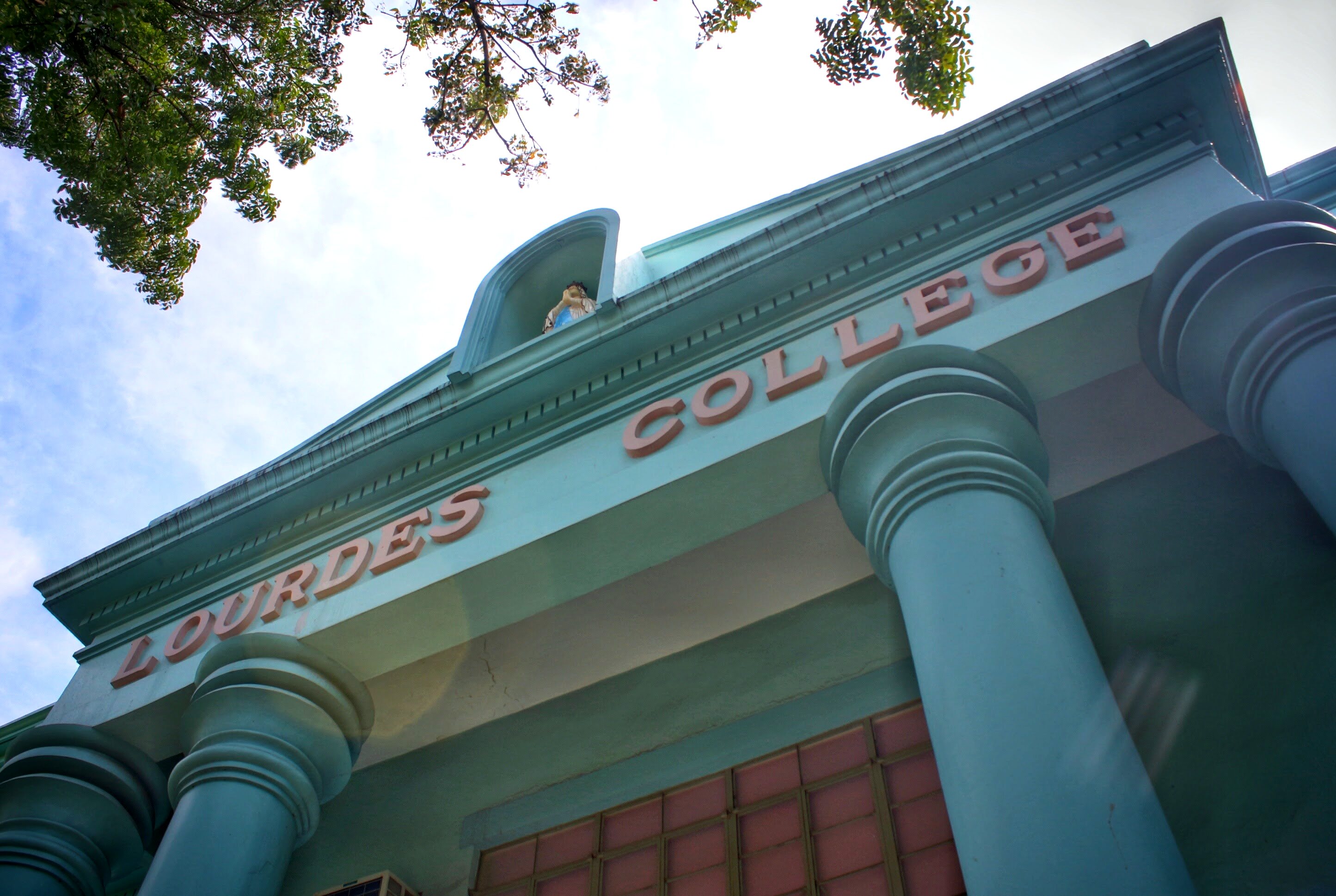
Lourdes College Inc.

The city has five major private universities/colleges: Xavier University – Ateneo de Cagayan, Capitol University, Liceo de Cagayan University, Lourdes College, and Cagayan de Oro College. The University of Science and Technology of Southern Philippines is the only state university in the city. Other higher education institutions include Southern Philippines College, Pilgrim Christian College, Informatics College Mindanao and STI College – Cagayan de Oro with Senior High School programs. There are also a number of foreign schools in the city with study programs.

Notable public and private elementary and high schools include Cagayan de Oro National High School, Bulua National High School, Misamis Oriental General Comprehensive High School, Gusa Regional Science High School - X, City Central School, St. Mary's School, Corpus Christi School, The Abba's Orchard Montessori School, Merry Child School, International School, Marymount Academy, Vineyard International Polytechnic College, St. Mary's Academy of Carmen run by the RVM Sisters, and Montessori de Oro. There are also schools in Cagayan de Oro that use the Accelerated Christian Education system. Two of these schools include Cavite Bible Baptist Academy-CDO branch, and Shekinah Glory Christian Academy. There are two Chinese schools in the city: Kong Hua School (Roman Catholic) and Oro Christian Grace School (an Evangelical Christian school). There are two international schools run by Koreans, namely: Nanuri International School and Immanuel Mission International School.

== Media ==
=== Television ===
==== Analog ====
- DXAL TV-4 (ALLTV2)
- DXCC TV-10 (IBC)
- DXTE TV-21 (TV5)
- DXCO TV-29 (One Sports)
- DXJC TV-35 (GMA)

==== Digital ====
- DXAL DTV-16 (ALLTV2)
- DXCC DTV-17 (IBC13)
- DXTE DTV-18 (TV5)
- DXEV DTV-20 (A2Z)
- DXBA DTV-43 (PRTV PRIME)
- DXDZ DTV-47 (GMA)
- PA DTV-51 (JAO TV)

==== Cable ====
- RPN (5 - Parasat Cable TV)

=== Radio ===
==== AM Frequency ====
- DXIF 729 (Bombo Radyo)
- DXCC 828 (RMN DXCC)
- DXIM 936 (Radyo Pilipinas) (Note: Off the air as an AM/FM radio station.) (Note: Operating through an internet/streaming radio station at the moment.)
- DXCO 1044 (Radyo Pilipino)
- DXKO 1368 (RPN Radyo Ronda)

==== FM Frequency ====
- DXRJ 88.5 (RJFM)
- DXKB 89.3 (K5 News FM)
- DXKI 90.3 (Strong Radio)
- 91.1 (Juander Radyo)
- PA 91.9 (Marian Radio)
- DXOC 92.7 (Heart FM)
- DXQR 93.5 (Home Radio)
- DXWZ 94.3 (Wild FM)
- DXBL 95.7 (Radyo Trumpeta)
- DXKS 96.9 (Easy Rock)
- DXJS 98.7 (Vanzy FM)
- DXVM 99.1 (iFM News)
- DXMR 99.9 (Magnum Radyo)
- DXLX 100.7 (Barangay LS)
- DXRL 101.5 (True FM)
- DXMM 102.5 (Brigada News FM)
- DXJL 103.3 (The New J)
- DXGR 103.9 (G103 Gold Radio)
- DXYR 104.7 (Yes FM)
- DXHY 106.3 (Radyo Natin)
- DXNY 107.9 (Win Radio)

=== Cable TV (Local) ===
- Parasat Cable Television
- Jade Cable TV

=== Newspaper ===
- Cagayan de Oro Journal
- Cagayan de Oro Times
- SuperBalita Cagayan de Oro
- SunStar
- Mindanao Post

=== Newscast ===
- One Mindanao (GMA TV-35/DTV-47 Cagayan de Oro, simulcast on GMA TV-5/DTV-37 Davao)

==== Defunct ====
- TV Patrol North Mindanao (ABS-CBN TV-23/DTV-40 Cagayan de Oro)

== Sister cities ==
Cagayan de Oro currently has six local and five international sister cities, as classified by the city government.

=== Local ===
- Quezon City
- Surigao City (1984)
- Batac (2023)
- Iligan
- Imus, Cavite (2019)
- Zamboanga City (2023)

=== International ===
- Lawndale, California, United States (1986)
- Tainan City, Taiwan (2005)
- Harbin, Heilongjiang, China (2007)
- Norfolk, Virginia, United States (2008)
- Gwangyang, Jeollanam-do, South Korea (n/a)

== Gallery ==
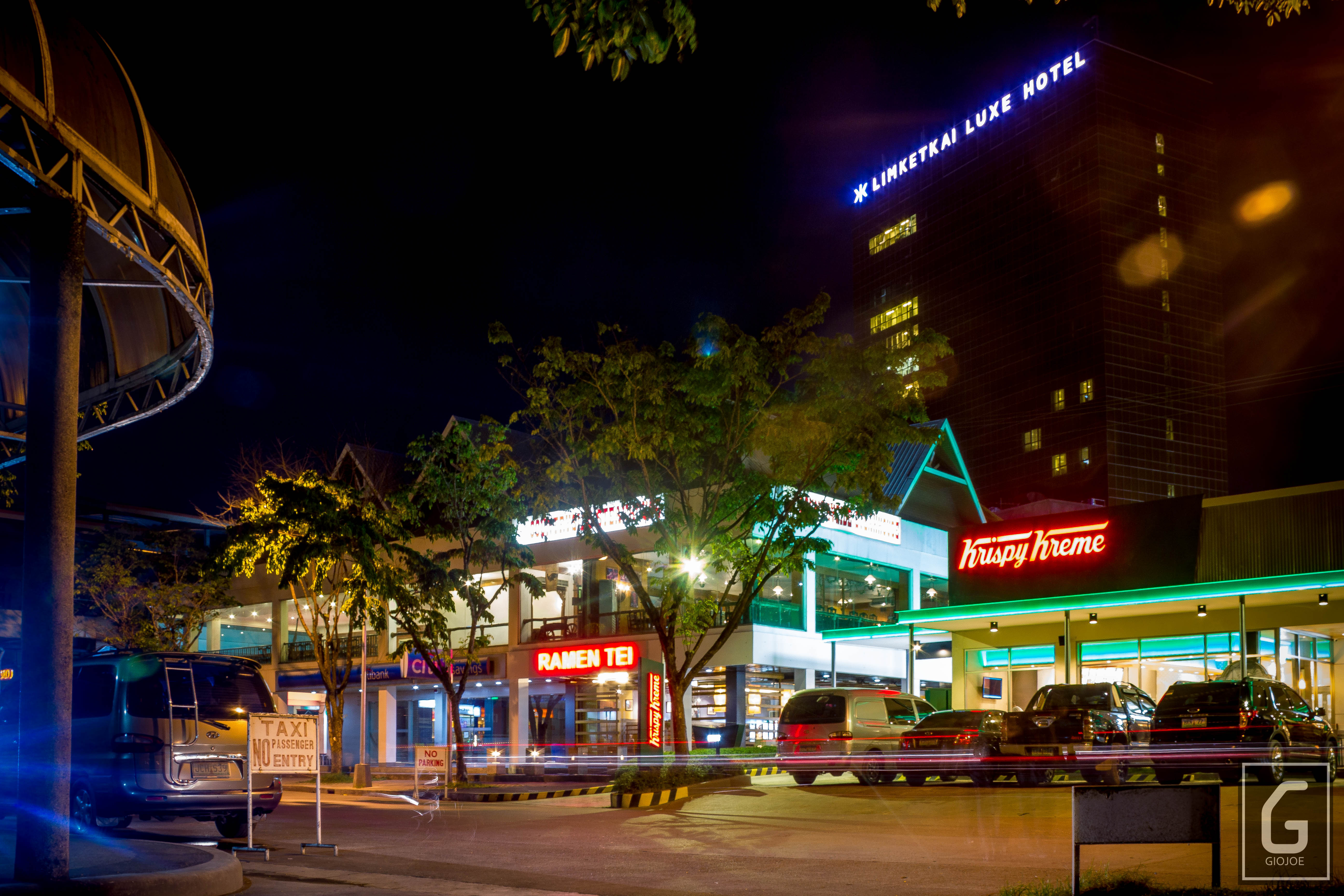
North Concourse, Limketkai Mall

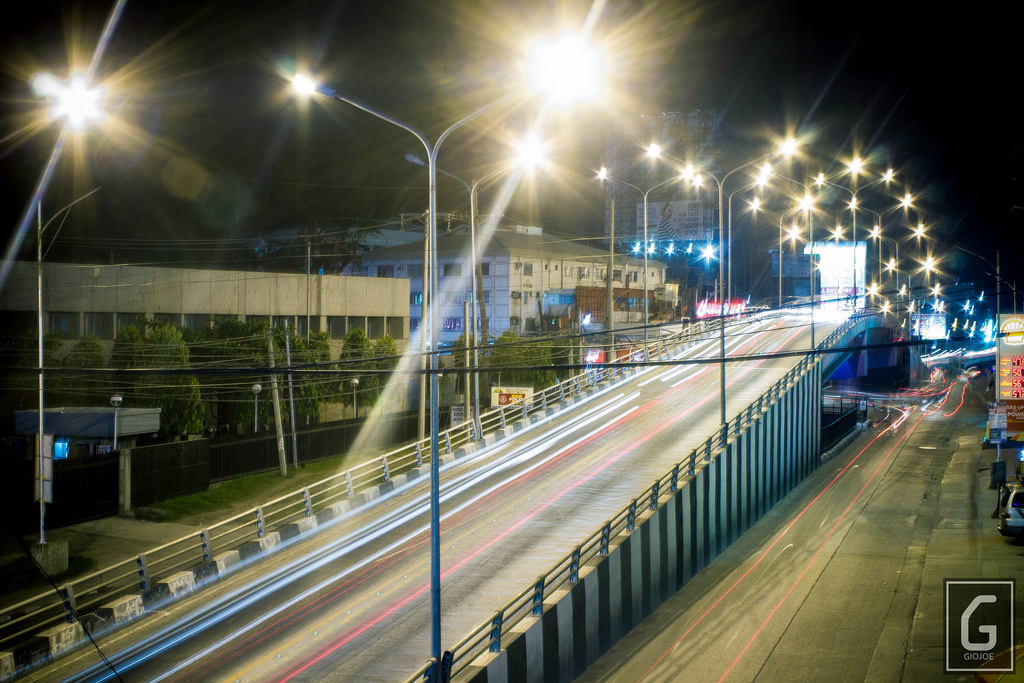
CM Recto Flyover

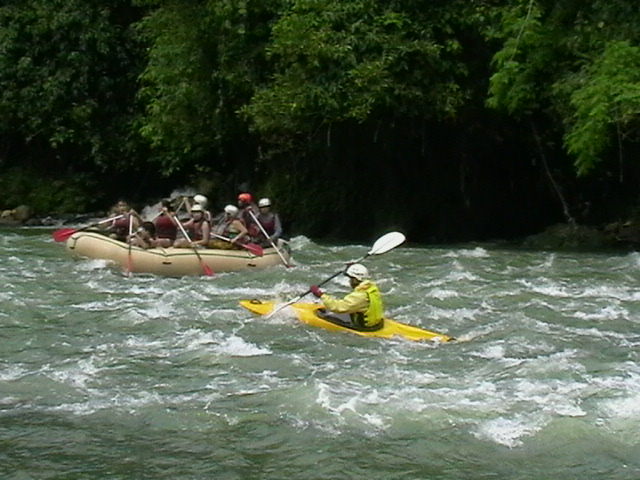
Whitewater rafting or kayaking adventures in the Cagayan River (Mindanao)

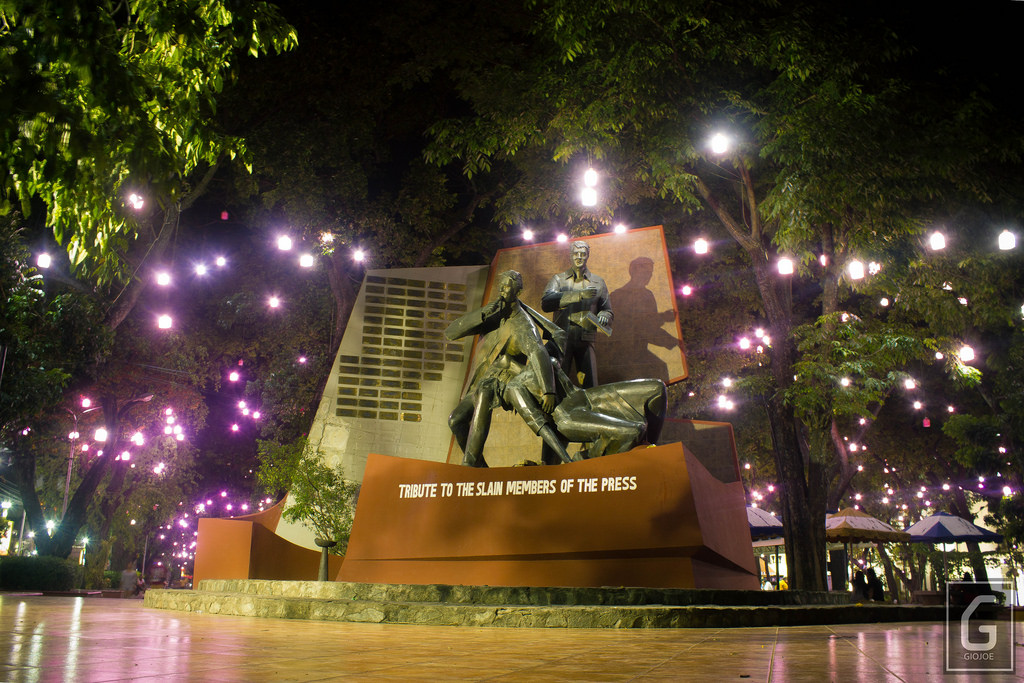
A Tribute monument to the slain members of the press

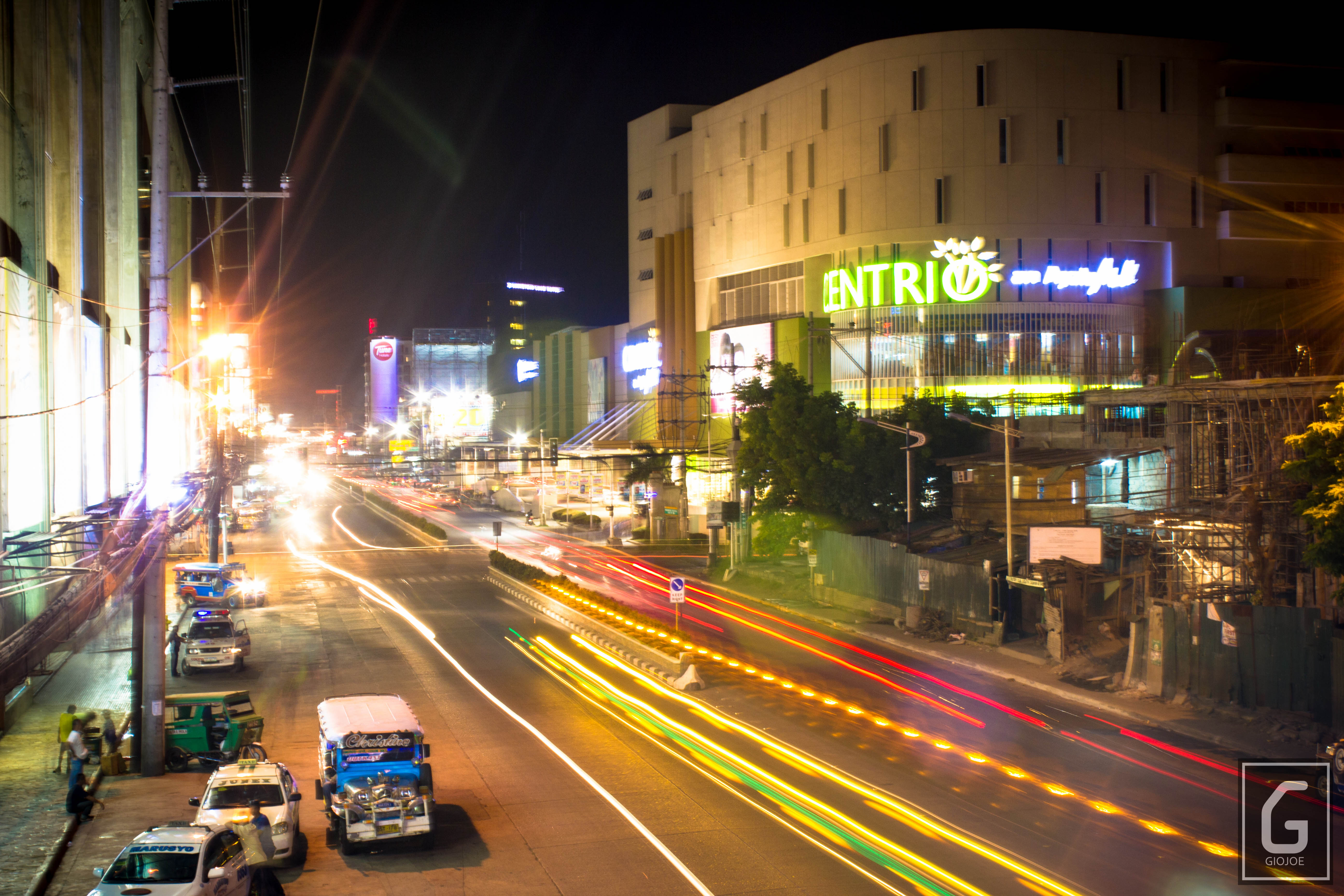
CM Recto Avenue with Centrio Mall at the background

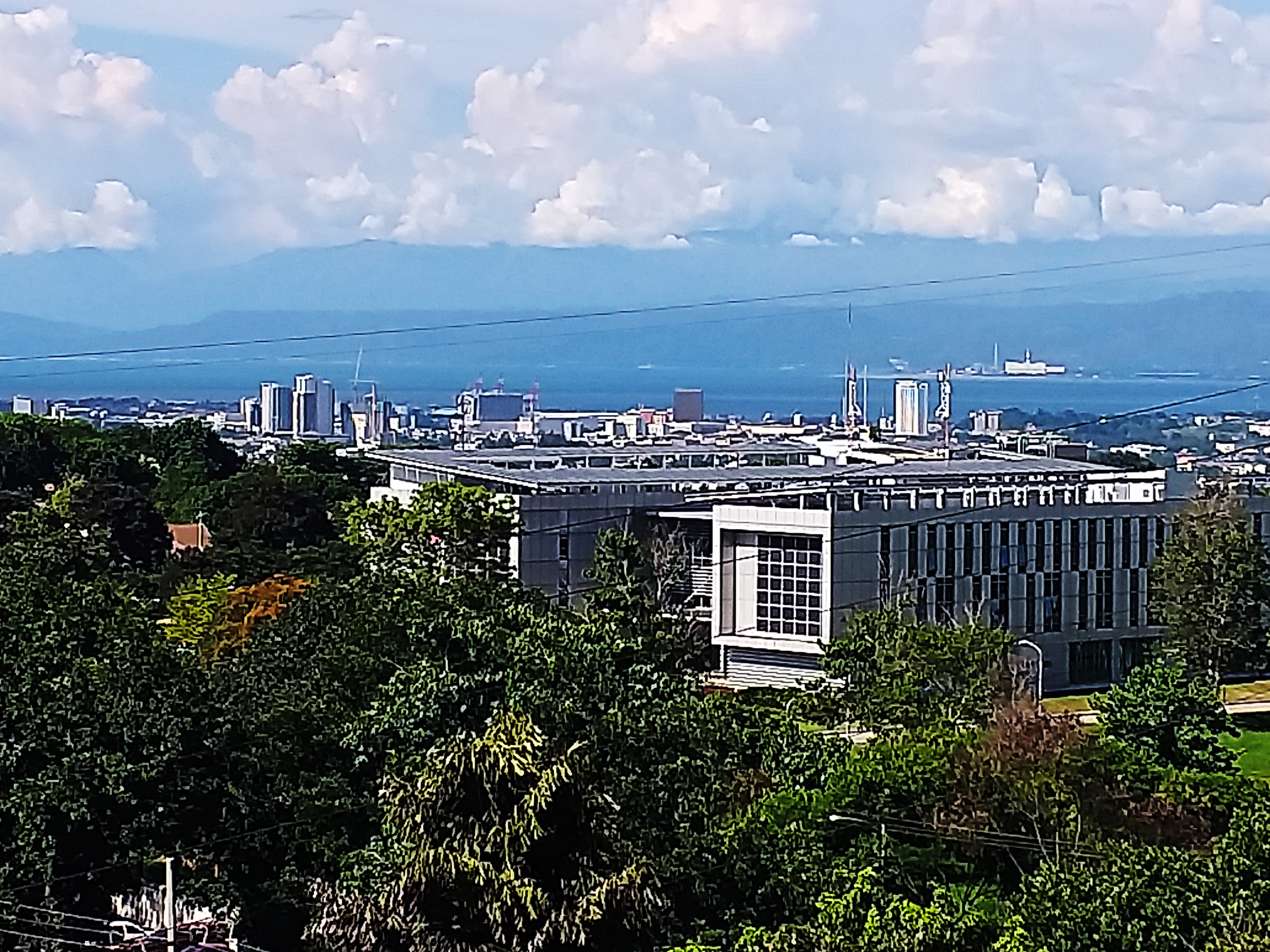
Photo taken from Uptown CDO

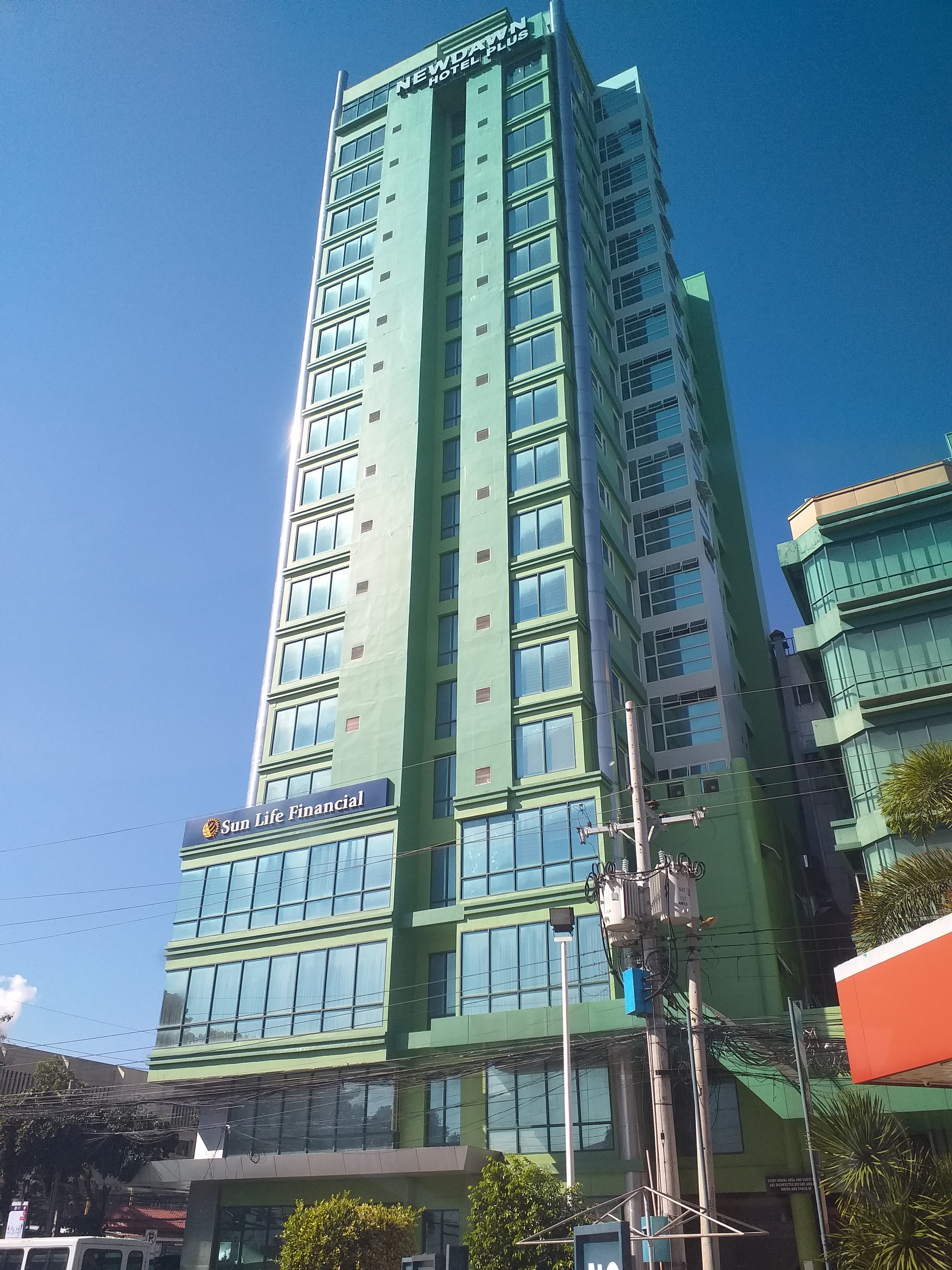
New Dawn Hotel Plus Building

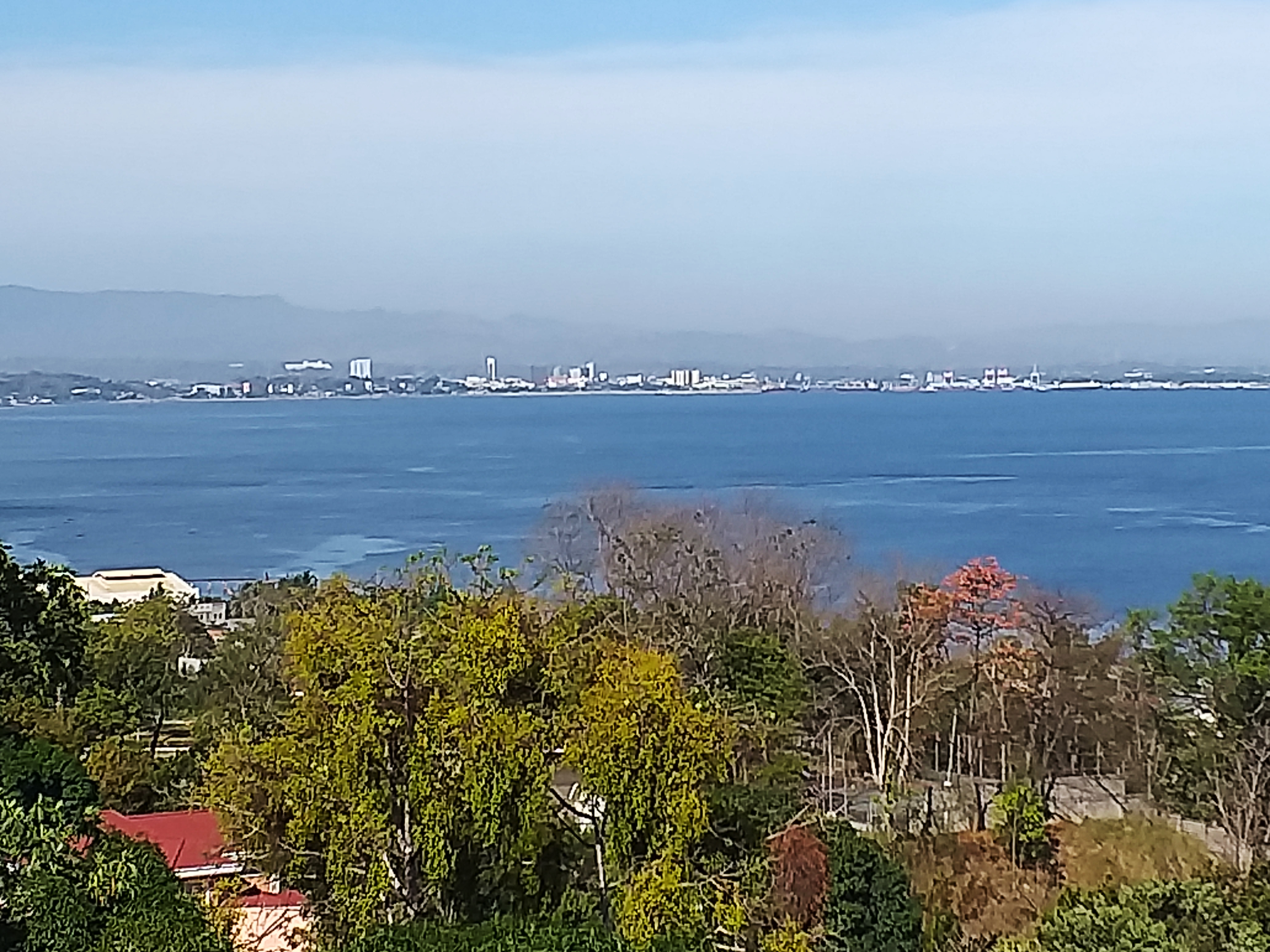
Cagayan de Oro City as seen from Upper Puerto

== See also ==
- List of renamed cities and municipalities in the Philippines
- List of tallest buildings in Cagayan de Oro
