= List of digital television stations in the Philippines =

Digital TV Standards around the world.

This is a list of digital terrestrial television (DTT) entries recorded by the National Telecommunications Commission (NTC) in the Philippines. The NTC selected ISDB-T as the country's DTT standard in 2010 and retained it after a review in 2013.

== Background ==
ISDB-T Segments

Updated as of November 2026. Most channels are still under test broadcast. All analog services in Mega Manila will be terminated on January 15, 2027 while the timing for the shutoff in the rest of the Philippines will be determined at a later date.

Under the NTC's regulatory framework, a DTT service uses a 6 MHz television channel and may carry television, audio and data services.

*Data collected from sources and some wiki pages. *Channels received may vary based on location or the strength of the broadcaster's signal. *Most channels are currently in the test broadcast phase, leading to areas where some stations cannot be received due to dead spots and low transmitting power among stations. *Some channels are encrypted and can only be accessed through select set-top box or mobile dongle manufacturers.

== National Capital Region (NCR) ==
=== Metro Manila ===
Callsign	Channel	Frequency	LCN	Name	Programming	Format	Power	Company	Airtime	Notes
DWGT	14	473.143 MHz	4.01	PTV HD1	PTV	16:9 1080i	10 kW	People's Television Network, Inc.	M-F 5:30 AM - 12:00 AM; S-Su 7:00 AM - 12:00 AM	Commercial Broadcast
DWGT	14	473.143 MHz	4.02	PTV SD1	PTV	16:9 480i	10 kW	People's Television Network, Inc.	M-F 5:30 AM - 12:00 AM; S-Su 7:00 AM - 12:00 AM	Commercial Broadcast
DWGT	14	473.143 MHz	4.03	PTV SD2	RP1	16:9 480i	10 kW	People's Television Network, Inc.	M-Su 6:00 AM - 8:00 PM	Commercial Broadcast
DWGT	14	473.143 MHz	4.04	PTV SD3	PTV Sports	16:9 480i	10 kW	People's Television Network, Inc.	M-Su 8:00 AM - 6:00 PM	Commercial Broadcast
DWGT	14	473.143 MHz	4.31	PTV 1 SEG	PTV	4:3 240p	10 kW	People's Television Network, Inc.	M-F 5:30 AM - 12:00 AM; S-Su 7:00 AM - 12:00 AM	1seg
DZBB	15	479.143 MHz	7.01	GMA	GMA	4:3 480i	15 kW	GMA Network, Inc.	M-F 5:30 AM - 12:30 AM; S-Su 5:30 AM - 12:00 AM	Commercial Broadcast
DZBB	15	479.143 MHz	7.02	GTV	GTV	4:3 480i	15 kW	GMA Network, Inc.	M-S 5:30 AM - 12:00 AM; Su 6:00 AM - 12:00 AM	Commercial Broadcast
DZBB	15	479.143 MHz	7.03	HEART OF ASIA	Heart of Asia	4:3 480i	15 kW	GMA Network, Inc.	M-Su 6:00 AM - 12:00 AM	Commercial Broadcast
DZBB	15	479.143 MHz	7.06	I HEART MOVIES	I Heart Movies	4:3 480i	15 kW	GMA Network, Inc.	M-Su 6:00 AM - 12:00 AM	Commercial Broadcast
DZBB	15	479.143 MHz	7.21	GMA 1-Seg	GMA	4:3 240p	15 kW	GMA Network, Inc.	M-F 5:30 AM - 12:30 AM; S-Su 5:30 AM - 12:00 AM	1seg
DZMV	16	485.143 MHz	2.01	ALLTV HD	ALLTV2	16:9 1080i	10 kW	Advanced Media Broadcasting System, Inc.	M-F 5:30 AM - 11:15 PM; S 5:30 AM - 12:00 AM; Su 6:00 AM - 12:45 AM	Commercial Broadcast
DZTV	17	491.143 MHz	13.01	IBC HD	IBC	16:9 1080i	5 kW	Intercontinental Broadcasting Corporation	M-F 5:30 AM - 11:00 PM; S-Su 7:00 AM - 10:00 PM	Commercial Broadcast
DZTV	17	491.143 MHz	13.02	CongressTV HD	Congress TV	16:9 1080i	5 kW	Intercontinental Broadcasting Corporation	M-Su 9:00 AM - 9:00 PM	Commercial Broadcast
DZTV	17	491.143 MHz	13.03	SenateTV HD	Senate TV	16:9 1080i	5 kW	Intercontinental Broadcasting Corporation	M-Su 9:00 AM - 9:00 PM	Test Broadcast
DWET	18	497.143 MHz	5.01	TV5	TV5	16:9 480i	20 kW	TV5 Network, Inc.	M-F 4:30 AM - 1:00 AM; S 7:00 AM - 1:30 AM; Su 5:30 AM - 1:30 AM	Commercial Broadcast
DWET	18	497.143 MHz	5.02	RPTV	RPTV	16:9 480i	20 kW	TV5 Network, Inc.	M-Su 6:00 AM - 12:00 AM	Commercial Broadcast
DWET	18	497.143 MHz	5.03	One Sports	One Sports	16:9 480i	20 kW	TV5 Network, Inc.	M-S 5:00 AM - 12:30 AM; Su 6:00 AM - 12:00 AM	Commercial Broadcast
DWET	18	497.143 MHz	5.35	One Seg S1	TV5	4:3 240p	20 kW	TV5 Network, Inc.	M-F 4:30 AM - 1:00 AM; S 7:00 AM - 1:30 AM; Su 5:30 AM - 1:30 AM	1seg
DZKB	19	503.143 MHz	19.02	RPTV HD	RPTV	16:9 1080i	5 kW	Radio Philippines Network, Inc.	M-Su 6:00 AM - 12:00 AM	Commercial Broadcast
DZKB	19	503.143 MHz	19.03	RPN SD Test 1	(SMPTE Color Bars)	4:3 480i	5 kW	Radio Philippines Network, Inc.	M-Su 6:00 AM - 12:00 AM	Test Broadcast
DZKB	19	503.143 MHz	19.06	RPTV 1-seg	RPTV	4:3 240p	5 kW	Radio Philippines Network, Inc.	M-Su 6:00 AM - 12:00 AM	1seg
DZOE	20	509.143 MHz	20.21	A2Z	A2Z	16:9 480i	5.5 kW	Zoe Broadcasting Network, Inc.	M-F 5:00 AM - 12:15 AM; S, Su 6:00 AM - 11:45 PM	Commercial Broadcast
DZOE	20	509.143 MHz	20.24	Light TV	Light TV	16:9 480i	5.5 kW	Zoe Broadcasting Network, Inc.	M-Su 6:00 AM - 12:00 AM	Commercial Broadcast
DZOE	20	509.143 MHz	20.31	A2Z Oneseg	—N/a	—N/a	5.5 kW	Zoe Broadcasting Network, Inc.	M-F 5:00 AM - 12:15 AM; S 6:00 AM - 11:00 PM; Su 6:00 AM - 11:45 PM	1seg
PA	21	515.143 MHz	21.02	SolarFlix	SolarFlix	4:3 480i	3 kW	Southern Broadcasting Network	M-Su 8:00 AM - 12:00 AM	Commercial Broadcast
PA	21	515.143 MHz	21.03	Solar Sports	Solar Sports	4:3 480i	3 kW	Southern Broadcasting Network	M-Su 8:00 AM - 12:00 AM	Commercial Broadcast
PA	21	515.143 MHz	21.04	DepEd TV	DepEd TV	4:3 480i	3 kW	Southern Broadcasting Network	M-Su 8:00 AM - 12:00 AM	Commercial Broadcast
PA	21	515.143 MHz	21.05	Shop TV	E-Novation TV	4:3 480i	3 kW	Southern Broadcasting Network	M-Su 8:00 AM - 12:00 AM	Test Broadcast
DWBA	23	527.143 MHz	23.01	ALIW CHANNEL 23	ALIW 23	16:9 1080i	5 kW	Aliw Broadcasting Corporation	M-Su 4:00 AM - 10:05 PM	Commercial Broadcast
DWBA	23	527.143 MHz	23.02	DWIZ NEWS TV	DWIZ News TV	16:9 480i	5 kW	Aliw Broadcasting Corporation	M-Su 4:00 AM - 10:05 PM	Commercial Broadcast
DZEC	28	557.143 MHz	25.01	NET25 HD	NET25	16:9 1080i	10 kW	Eagle Broadcasting Corporation	M-Su 4:00 AM - 12:00 AM	Commercial Broadcast
DZEC	28	557.143 MHz	25.02	NET25 SD	NET25	16:9 480i	10 kW	Eagle Broadcasting Corporation	M-Su 4:00 AM - 12:00 AM	Commercial Broadcast
DZRJ	29	563.143 MHz	29.21	RJ DigiTV	RJ DigiTV	16:9 480i	2.5 kW	Free Air Broadcasting Network, Inc.	M-Su 6:00 AM - 12:00 AM	Commercial Broadcast
DZRJ	29	563.143 MHz	29.22	Timeless TV	(SMPTE Color Bars)	16:9 480i	2.5 kW	Free Air Broadcasting Network, Inc.	M-Su 6:00 AM - 12:00 AM	Commercial Broadcast
DZRJ	29	563.143 MHz	29.23	Radyo Bandido TV	Radyo Bandido	4:3 480i	2.5 kW	Free Air Broadcasting Network, Inc.	M-Su 6:00 AM - 10:00 PM	Commercial Broadcast
DZRJ	29	563.143 MHz	29.24	Rock Of Manila TV	Rock MNL	16:9 480i	2.5 kW	Free Air Broadcasting Network, Inc.	M-Su 6:00 AM - 12:00 AM	Commercial Broadcast
DZRJ	29	563.143 MHz	29.25	TV Maria	TV Maria	16:9 480i	2.5 kW	Free Air Broadcasting Network, Inc.	M-Su 6:00 AM - 12:00 AM	Commercial Broadcast
DWKC	31	575.143 MHz	31.01	PRTV PRIME	PRTV Prime Media	4:3 480i	5 kW	Broadcast Enterprises & Affiliated Media, Inc.	M-F 6:00 AM - 12:00 AM; S 6:00 AM - 10:00 PM; Su 6:00 AM - 12:00 AM	Commercial Broadcast
DWKC	31	575.143 MHz	31.02	KNOWLEDGE CHANNEL	Knowledge Channel	4:3 480i	5 kW	Broadcast Enterprises & Affiliated Media, Inc.	6:00 AM - 11:00 PM	Commercial Broadcast
DWKC	31	575.143 MHz	31.03	RESERVED	(SMPTE Color Bars)	4:3 480i	5 kW	Broadcast Enterprises & Affiliated Media, Inc.	M-Su 6:00 AM - 12:00 AM	Test Broadcast
DWKC	31	575.143 MHz	31.04	BILYONARYO NEWS CHANNEL	Bilyonaryo News Channel	4:3 480i	5 kW	Broadcast Enterprises & Affiliated Media, Inc.	M-Su 6:00 AM - 12:00 AM	Commercial Broadcast
DWKC	31	575.143 MHz	31.05	D8TV	D8TV	4:3 480i	5 kW	Broadcast Enterprises & Affiliated Media, Inc.	M-Su 6:00 AM - 12:00 AM	Commercial Broadcast
DZOZ	33	587.143 MHz	33.01	Light TV HD	Light TV	16:9 1080i	5 kW	Zoe Broadcasting Network, Inc.	M-Su 6:00 AM - 12:00 AM	Commercial Broadcast
DZOZ	33	587.143 MHz	33.02	Light TV SD1	Light TV	16:9 1080i	5 kW	Zoe Broadcasting Network, Inc.	M-Su 6:00 AM - 12:00 AM	Commercial Broadcast
DWAO	38	617.143 MHz	55.01	UNTV-1	UNTV	4:3 480i	2.5 kW	Progressive Broadcasting Corporation	M-Su 12:01 AM - 12:00 AM	Commercial Broadcast
DWAO	38	617.143 MHz	55.02	STV	UNTV	16:9 1080i	2.5 kW	Progressive Broadcasting Corporation	M-Su 12:01 AM - 12:00 AM	Commercial Broadcast
DWAO	38	617.143 MHz	55.03	TRUTH CHANNEL	Truth Channel	16:9 1080i	2.5 kW	Progressive Broadcasting Corporation	M-Su 12:01 AM - 12:00 AM	Commercial Broadcast
DWAO	38	617.143 MHz	55.04	UNTV Reserve	—N/a	—N/a	2.5 kW	Progressive Broadcasting Corporation	M-Su 12:01 AM - 12:00 AM	Test Broadcast
DWAO	38	617.143 MHz	55.31	UNTV 1SEG	UNTV	4:3 240p	2.5 kW	Progressive Broadcasting Corporation	M-Su 12:01 AM - 12:00 AM	1seg
DWVN	45	659.143 MHz	45.01	Hope Phil	Hope Channel	16:9 720p	3.5 kW	Gateway UHF TV Broadcasting, Inc.	M-Su. 12:01 AM - 12:00 AM	Commercial Broadcast
DWVN	45	659.143 MHz	45.02	Hope Live	Hope Channel	16:9 720p	3.5 kW	Gateway UHF TV Broadcasting, Inc.	M-Su. 12:01 AM - 12:00 AM	Commercial Broadcast
DWVN	45	659.143 MHz	45.03	Hope Intl	Hope Channel	16:9 720p	3.5 kW	Gateway UHF TV Broadcasting, Inc.	M-Su. 12:01 AM - 12:00 AM	Commercial Broadcast
DWVN	45	659.143 MHz	45.04	GNN	GNN	16:9 720p	3.5 kW	Gateway UHF TV Broadcasting, Inc.	M-Su. 12:01 AM - 12:00 AM	Commercial Broadcast
DZCE	49	683.143 MHz	49.01	INCTV HD	INC TV	16:9 1080i	10 kW	Christian Era Bctg. Service, Inc.	M-Su 4:00 AM - 12:00 AM	Commercial Broadcast
DZCE	49	683.143 MHz	49.02	INCTV SD	INC TV	16:9 480i	10 kW	Christian Era Bctg. Service, Inc.	M-Su 4:00 AM - 12:00 AM	Commercial Broadcast
DZCE	49	683.143 MHz	49.05	INCTV 1SEG	INC TV	4:3 240p	10 kW	Christian Era Bctg. Service, Inc.	M-Su 4:00 AM - 12:00 AM	1seg
PA	51	695.143 MHz	5.01	TV5	TV5	16:9 480i	5.5 kW	Cignal TV, Inc. (Mediascape, Inc.)	M-F 4:30 AM - 1:00 AM; S 7:00 AM - 1:30 AM; Su 5:30 AM - 1:30 AM	Commercial Broadcast
PA	51	695.143 MHz	5.02	RPTV	RPTV	16:9 480i	5.5 kW	Cignal TV, Inc. (Mediascape, Inc.)	M-Su 6:00 AM - 12:00 AM	Commercial Broadcast
PA	51	695.143 MHz	5.03	One Sports	One Sports	16:9 480i	5.5 kW	Cignal TV, Inc. (Mediascape, Inc.)	M-S 5:00 AM - 12:30 AM; Su 6:00 AM - 12:00 AM	Commercial Broadcast
PA	51	695.143 MHz	5.35	One Seg S1	TV5	4:3 240p	5.5 kW	Cignal TV, Inc. (Mediascape, Inc.)	M-F 4:30 AM - 1:00 AM; S 7:00 AM - 1:30 AM; Su 5:30 AM - 1:30 AM	1seg

== Cordillera Administrative Region (CAR) ==
=== Benguet ===
Callsign	Channel	Frequency	LCN	Name	Programming	Format	Power	Location	Company	Airtime	Notes
DZHB	17	491.143 MHz	17.01	IBC13	IBC	16:9 1080i	5 kW	Mt. Sto. Tomas	Intercontinental Broadcasting Corporation	M-F 5:30 AM - 11:00 PM; S-Su 7:00 AM - 10:00 PM	Commercial Broadcast
DZHB	17	491.143 MHz	17.02	Congress TV	Congress TV	16:9 1080i	5 kW	Mt. Sto. Tomas	Intercontinental Broadcasting Corporation	M-Su 9:00 AM - 9:00 PM	Commercial Broadcast
DZBS	19	503.143 MHz	19.01	RPTV HD	RPTV	16:9 1080i	5 kW	Mt. Sto. Tomas	Radio Philippines Network, Inc.	M-Su 6:00 AM - 12:00 AM	Commercial Broadcast
DZBS	19	503.143 MHz	19.02	RPTV 1-seg	RPTV	4:3 240p	5 kW	Mt. Sto. Tomas	Radio Philippines Network, Inc.	M-Su 6:00 AM - 12:00 AM	1seg
PA	25	539.143 MHz	25.01	NET25	NET25	16:9 1080i	1 kW	Mt. Sto. Tomas	Eagle Broadcasting Corporation	M-Su 4:00 AM - 12:00 AM	Commercial Broadcast
PA	25	539.143 MHz	25.02	INCTV	INCTV	16:9 1080i	1 kW	Mt. Sto. Tomas	Eagle Broadcasting Corporation	M-Su 4:00 AM - 12:00 AM	Commercial Broadcast
DWHB	26	545.143 MHz	26.01	PRTV PRIME	PRTV Prime Media	4:3 480i	5 kW	Mt. Sto. Tomas	Broadcast Enterprises and Affiliated Media, Inc.	M-F 6:00 AM - 12:00 AM; S 6:00 AM - 10:00 AM; Su 6:00 AM - 12:00 AM	Commercial Broadcast
DWHB	26	545.143 MHz	26.02	KNOWLEDGE CHANNEL	Knowledge Channel	4:3 480i	5 kW	Mt. Sto. Tomas	Broadcast Enterprises and Affiliated Media, Inc.	M-Su 6:00 AM - 11:00 PM	Commercial Broadcast
DWHB	26	545.143 MHz	26.03	RESERVED	(SMPTE Color Bars)	4:3 480i	5 kW	Mt. Sto. Tomas	Broadcast Enterprises and Affiliated Media, Inc.	M-Su 6:00 AM - 12:00 AM	Test Broadcast
DWHB	26	545.143 MHz	26.04	BILYONARYO NEWS CHANNEL	Bilyonaryo News Channel	4:3 480i	5 kW	Mt. Sto. Tomas	Broadcast Enterprises and Affiliated Media, Inc.	M-Su 6:00 AM - 12:00 AM	Commercial Broadcast
DWHB	26	545.143 MHz	26.05	D8TV	D8TV	4:3 480i	5 kW	Mt. Sto. Tomas	Broadcast Enterprises and Affiliated Media, Inc.	M-Su 6:00 AM - 12:00 AM	Commercial Broadcast
DWAY	30	569.143 MHz	2.01	ALLTV HD	ALLTV2	16:9 1080i	10 kW	Mt. Sto. Tomas	Advanced Media Broadcasting System, Inc.	M-F 5:30 AM - 11:15 PM; S 5:30 AM - 12:00 AM; Su 6:00 AM - 12:45 AM	Commercial Broadcast
DWBJ	32	581.143 MHz	32.01	A2Z	A2Z	4:3 480i	5.5 kW	Mt. Sto. Tomas	Zoe Broadcasting Network, Inc.	M-F 5:00 AM - 12:15 AM; S 6:00 AM - 11:00 PM; Su 6:00 AM - 11:45 PM	Commercial Broadcast
DWBJ	32	581.143 MHz	32.02	Light TV	Light TV	4:3 480i	5.5 kW	Mt. Sto. Tomas	Zoe Broadcasting Network, Inc.	M-Su 6:00 AM - 12:00 AM	Commercial Broadcast
DWBJ	32	581.143 MHz	32.31	A2Z Oneseg	—N/a	—N/a	5.5 kW	Mt. Sto. Tomas	Zoe Broadcasting Network, Inc.	M-F 5:00 AM - 12:15 AM; S 6:00 AM - 11:00 PM; Su 6:00 AM - 11:45 PM	1Seg
DZEA	38	617.143 MHz	10.01	GMA	GMA	4:3 480i	15 kW	Mt. Sto. Tomas	GMA Network, Inc.	M-F 5:30 AM - 12:30 AM; S-Su 5:30 AM - 12:00 AM	Commercial Broadcast
DZEA	38	617.143 MHz	10.02	GTV	GTV	4:3 480i	15 kW	Mt. Sto. Tomas	GMA Network, Inc.	M-S 5:30 AM - 12:00 AM; Su 6:00 AM - 12:00 AM	Commercial Broadcast
DZEA	38	617.143 MHz	10.03	HEART OF ASIA	Heart of Asia	4:3 480i	15 kW	Mt. Sto. Tomas	GMA Network, Inc.	M-Su 6:00 AM - 12:00 AM	Commercial Broadcast
DZEA	38	617.143 MHz	10.06	I HEART MOVIES	I Heart Movies	4:3 480i	15 kW	Mt. Sto. Tomas	GMA Network, Inc.	M-Su 6:00 AM - 12:00 AM	Commercial Broadcast
DZEA	38	617.143 MHz	10.21	GMA 1-Seg	GMA	4:3 240p	15 kW	Mt. Sto. Tomas	GMA Network, Inc.	M-F 5:30 AM - 12:30 AM; S-Su 5:30 AM - 12:00 AM	1seg
D-8-XM	42	641.143 MHz	4.01	PTV HD1	PTV	16:9 1080i	5 kW	Mt. Sto. Tomas	People's Television Network, Inc.	M-F 5:30 AM - 12:00 AM; S-Su 7:00 AM - 12:00 AM	Commercial Broadcast
D-8-XM	42	641.143 MHz	4.02	PTV SD2	—N/a	16:9 480i	5 kW	Mt. Sto. Tomas	People's Television Network, Inc.	M-F 5:30 AM - 12:00 AM; S-Su 7:00 AM - 12:00 AM	Commercial Broadcast
D-8-XM	42	641.143 MHz	4.03	PTV SD3	—N/a	16:9 480i	5 kW	Mt. Sto. Tomas	People's Television Network, Inc.	M-F 5:30 AM - 12:00 AM; S-Su 7:00 AM - 12:00 AM	Commercial Broadcast
D-8-XM	42	641.143 MHz	4.04	PTV 1SEG	PTV	4:3 240p	5 kW	Mt. Sto. Tomas	People's Television Network, Inc.	M-F 5:30 AM - 12:00 AM; S-Su 7:00 AM - 12:00 AM	1seg
DWFB	44	653.143 MHz	44.01	GNN North Luzon	GNN North Luzon	16:9 720p	3 kW	Mt. Sto. Tomas	Global Satellite Technology Services, Inc.	M-Su 6:00 AM - 8:00 PM	Test Broadcast
DWFB	44	653.143 MHz	44.02	RNG	RNG Luzon	16:9 720p	3 kW	Mt. Sto. Tomas	Global Satellite Technology Services, Inc.	M-Su 6:00 AM - 8:00 PM	Test Broadcast
DWFB	44	653.143 MHz	44.03	Golf Philippines	Golf Channel	16:9 720p	3 kW	Mt. Sto. Tomas	Global Satellite Technology Services, Inc.	M-Su 6:00 AM - 8:00 PM	Test Broadcast
DWFB	44	653.143 MHz	44.04	Hope Channel Phils	Hope Channel	16:9 720p	3 kW	Mt. Sto. Tomas	Global Satellite Technology Services, Inc.	M-Su 6:00 AM - 8:00 PM	Test Broadcast
DZET	51	695.143 MHz	5.01	TV5	TV5	16:9 480i	10 kW	Mt. Sto. Tomas	TV5 Network, Inc. (ABC Development Corp.)	M-F 4:30 AM - 1:00 AM; S 7:00 AM - 1:30 AM; Su 5:30 AM - 1:30 AM	Commercial Broadcast
DZET	51	695.143 MHz	5.02	RPTV	RPTV	16:9 480i	10 kW	Mt. Sto. Tomas	TV5 Network, Inc. (ABC Development Corp.)	M-Su 6:00 AM - 12:00 AM	Commercial Broadcast
DZET	51	695.143 MHz	5.03	One Sports	One Sports	16:9 480i	10 kW	Mt. Sto. Tomas	TV5 Network, Inc. (ABC Development Corp.)	M-S 5:00 AM - 12:30 AM; Su 6:00 AM - 12:00 AM	Commercial Broadcast
DZET	51	695.143 MHz	5.35	One Seg S1	TV5	4:3 240p	10 kW	Mt. Sto. Tomas	TV5 Network, Inc. (ABC Development Corp.)	M-F 4:30 AM - 1:00 AM; S 7:00 AM - 1:30 AM; Su 5:30 AM - 1:30 AM	1seg

=== Mountain Province ===
Callsign	Channel	Frequency	LCN	Name	Programming	Format	Power	Location	Company	Airtime	Notes
DZVG	29	563.143 MHz	05.01	GMA	GMA	4:3 480i	10 kW	Mt. Amuyao	GMA Network, Inc.	M-F 5:30 AM - 12:30 AM; S-Su 5:30 AM - 12:00 AM	Commercial Broadcast
DZVG	29	563.143 MHz	05.02	GTV	GTV	4:3 480i	10 kW	Mt. Amuyao	GMA Network, Inc.	M-S 5:30 AM - 12:00 AM; Su 6:00 AM - 12:00 AM	Commercial Broadcast
DZVG	29	563.143 MHz	05.03	HEART OF ASIA	Heart of Asia	4:3 480i	10 kW	Mt. Amuyao	GMA Network, Inc.	M-Su 6:00 AM - 12:00 AM	Commercial Broadcast
DZVG	29	563.143 MHz	05.06	I HEART MOVIES	I Heart Movies	4:3 480i	10 kW	Mt. Amuyao	GMA Network, Inc.	M-Su 6:00 AM - 12:00 AM	Commercial Broadcast
DZVG	29	563.143 MHz	05.21	GMA 1-Seg	GMA	4:3 240p	10 kW	Mt. Amuyao	GMA Network, Inc.	M-F 5:30 AM - 12:30 AM; S-Su 5:30 AM - 12:00 AM	1seg

== Ilocos Region (Region I) ==
=== Ilocos Norte ===
Callsign	Channel	Frequency	LCN	Name	Programming	Format	Power	Location	Company	Airtime	Notes
PA	16	485.143 MHz	2.01	ALLTV HD	ALLTV2	16:9 1080i	1 kW	San Nicolas	Advanced Media Broadcasting System, Inc.	M-F 5:30 AM - 11:15 PM; S 5:30 AM - 12:00 AM; Su 6:00 AM - 12:45 AM	Test Broadcast
DWCS	17	491.143 MHz	17.01	IBC13	IBC 13	16:9 1080i	5 kW	Laoag	Intercontinental Broadcasting Corporation	M-F 5:30 AM - 11:00 PM; S-Su 7:00 AM - 10:00 PM	Test Broadcast
DWCS	17	491.143 MHz	17.02	Congress TV	Congress TV	16:9 1080i	5 kW	Laoag	Intercontinental Broadcasting Corporation	M-Su 9:00 AM - 9:00 PM	Test Broadcast
DWTE	18	497.143 MHz	5.01	TV5	TV5	16:9 480i	5 kW	Laoag	TV5 Network, Inc.	M-F 4:30 AM - 1:00 AM; S 7:00 AM - 1:30 AM; Su 5:30 AM - 1:30 AM	Commercial Broadcast
DWTE	18	497.143 MHz	5.02	RPTV	RPTV	16:9 480i	5 kW	Laoag	TV5 Network, Inc.	M-Su 6:00 AM - 12:00 AM	Commercial Broadcast
DWTE	18	497.143 MHz	5.03	One Sports	One Sports	16:9 480i	5 kW	Laoag	TV5 Network, Inc.	M-S 5:00 AM - 12:30 AM; Su 6:00 AM - 12:00 AM	Commercial Broadcast
DWTE	18	497.143 MHz	5.35	One Seg S1	TV5	16:9 96p	5 kW	Laoag	TV5 Network, Inc.	M-F 4:30 AM - 1:00 AM; S 7:00 AM - 1:30 AM; Su 5:30 AM - 1:30 AM	1seg
D-5-AS	24	533.143 MHz	7.01	GMA	GMA	4:3 480i	5 kW	San Nicolas	GMA Network, Inc.	M-F 5:30 AM - 12:30 AM; S-Su 5:30 AM - 12:00 AM	Commercial Broadcast
D-5-AS	24	533.143 MHz	7.02	GTV	GTV	4:3 480i	5 kW	San Nicolas	GMA Network, Inc.	M-S 5:30 AM - 12:00 AM; Su 6:00 AM - 12:00 AM	Commercial Broadcast
D-5-AS	24	533.143 MHz	7.03	HEART OF ASIA	Heart of Asia	4:3 480i	5 kW	San Nicolas	GMA Network, Inc.	M-Su 6:00 AM - 12:00 AM	Commercial Broadcast
D-5-AS	24	533.143 MHz	7.06	I HEART MOVIES	I Heart Movies	4:3 480i	5 kW	San Nicolas	GMA Network, Inc.	M-Su 6:00 AM - 12:00 AM	Commercial Broadcast
D-5-AS	24	533.143 MHz	7.21	GMA 1-Seg	GMA	4:3 240p	5 kW	San Nicolas	GMA Network, Inc.	M-F 5:30 AM - 12:30 AM; S-Su 5:30 AM - 12:00 AM	1seg
D-11-ZV	42	641.143 MHz	11.01	PTNI HD	PTV	16:9 1080i	1 kW	Batac	People's Television Network, Inc.	M-F 5:30 AM - 12:00 AM; S-Su 7:00 AM - 12:00 AM	Commercial Broadcast
D-11-ZV	42	641.143 MHz	11.02	PTNI SD	—N/a	—N/a	1 kW	Batac	People's Television Network, Inc.	M-F 5:30 AM - 12:00 AM; S-Su 7:00 AM - 12:00 AM	Commercial Broadcast
D-11-ZV	42	641.143 MHz	11.31	PTV 1SEG	PTV	4:3 240p	1 kW	Batac	People's Television Network, Inc.	M-F 5:30 AM - 12:00 AM; S-Su 7:00 AM - 12:00 AM	1seg

=== Ilocos Sur ===
Callsign	Channel	Frequency	LCN	Name	Programming	Format	Power	Location	Company	Airtime	Notes
DWBC	15	479.143 MHz	48.01	GMA	GMA	4:3 480i	5 kW	Bantay	GMA Network, Inc.	M-F 5:30 AM - 12:30 AM; S-Su 5:30 AM - 12:00 AM	Commercial Broadcast
DWBC	15	479.143 MHz	48.02	GTV	GTV	4:3 480i	5 kW	Bantay	GMA Network, Inc.	M-S 5:30 AM - 12:00 AM; Su 6:00 AM - 12:00 AM	Commercial Broadcast
DWBC	15	479.143 MHz	48.03	HEART OF ASIA	Heart of Asia	4:3 480i	5 kW	Bantay	GMA Network, Inc.	M-Su 6:00 AM - 12:00 AM	Commercial Broadcast
DWBC	15	479.143 MHz	48.06	I HEART MOVIES	I Heart Movies	4:3 480i	5 kW	Bantay	GMA Network, Inc.	M-Su 6:00 AM - 12:00 AM	Commercial Broadcast
DWBC	15	479.143 MHz	48.21	GMA 1-Seg	GMA	4:3 240p	5 kW	Bantay	GMA Network, Inc.	M-F 5:30 AM - 12:30 AM; S-Su 5:30 AM - 12:00 AM	1seg
DWDI	18	497.143 MHz	5.01	TV5	TV5	16:9 480i	5 kW	Vigan	Cignal TV, Inc. (Mediascape, Inc.)	M-F 4:30 AM - 1:00 AM; S 7:00 AM - 1:30 AM; Su 5:30 AM - 1:30 AM	Commercial Broadcast
DWDI	18	497.143 MHz	5.02	RPTV	RPTV	16:9 480i	5 kW	Vigan	Cignal TV, Inc. (Mediascape, Inc.)	M-Su 6:00 AM - 12:00 AM	Commercial Broadcast
DWDI	18	497.143 MHz	5.03	One Sports	One Sports	16:9 480i	5 kW	Vigan	Cignal TV, Inc. (Mediascape, Inc.)	M-S 5:00 AM - 12:30 AM; Su 6:00 AM - 12:00 AM	Commercial Broadcast
DWDI	18	497.143 MHz	5.35	One Seg S1	TV5	16:9 96p	5 kW	Vigan	Cignal TV, Inc. (Mediascape, Inc.)	M-F 4:30 AM - 1:00 AM; S 7:00 AM - 1:30 AM; Su 5:30 AM - 1:30 AM	1seg
DWTP	45	659.143 MHz	45.01	DZTP	DZTP	16:9 720p	2.5 kW	Candon	Tirad Pass & TV Broadcasting Nett., Inc.	M-Su 6:00 AM - 10:00 PM	Test Broadcast
DWTP	45	659.143 MHz	45.02	TPN	TPN	16:9 720p	2.5 kW	Candon	Tirad Pass & TV Broadcasting Nett., Inc.	M-Su 6:00 AM - 10:00 PM	Test Broadcast
DWTP	45	659.143 MHz	45.03	CABTV	CAB tV	16:9 720p	2.5 kW	Candon	Tirad Pass & TV Broadcasting Nett., Inc.	M-Su 6:00 AM - 10:00 PM	Test Broadcast

== Cagayan Valley (Region II) ==
=== Cagayan ===
Callsign	Channel	Frequency	LCN	Name	Programming	Format	Power	Location	Company	Airtime	Notes
PA	17	491.143 MHz	17.01	IBC13	IBC	16:9 1080i	5 kW	Tuguegarao	Intercontinental Broadcasting Corporation	M-F 5:30 AM - 11:00 PM; S-Su 7:00 AM - 10:00 PM	Test Broadcast
PA	17	491.143 MHz	17.02	Congress TV	Congress TV	16:9 1080i	5 kW	Tuguegarao	Intercontinental Broadcasting Corporation	M-Su 9:00 AM - 9:00 PM	Test Broadcast
DWZE	18	497.143 MHz	5.01	TV5	TV5	16:9 480i	5 kW	Tuguegarao	Interactive Broadcast Media, Inc.	M-F 4:30 AM - 1:00 AM; S 7:00 AM - 1:30 AM; Su 5:30 AM - 1:30 AM	Commercial Broadcast
DWZE	18	497.143 MHz	5.02	RPTV	RPTV	16:9 480i	5 kW	Tuguegarao	Interactive Broadcast Media, Inc.	M-Su 6:00 AM - 12:00 AM	Commercial Broadcast
DWZE	18	497.143 MHz	5.03	One Sports	One Sports	16:9 480i	5 kW	Tuguegarao	Interactive Broadcast Media, Inc.	M-S 5:00 AM - 12:30 AM; Su 6:00 AM - 12:00 AM	Commercial Broadcast
DWZE	18	497.143 MHz	5.35	One Seg S1	TV5	16:9 96p	5 kW	Tuguegarao	Interactive Broadcast Media, Inc.	M-F 4:30 AM - 1:00 AM; S 7:00 AM - 1:30 AM; Su 5:30 AM - 1:30 AM	1seg

=== Isabela ===
Callsign	Channel	Frequency	LCN	Name	Programming	Format	Power	Location	Company	Airtime	Notes
DWLE	15	479.143 MHz	7.01	GMA	GMA	4:3 480i	5 kW	Santiago	GMA Network, Inc.	M-F 5:30 AM - 12:30 AM; S-Su 5:30 AM - 12:00 AM	Commercial Broadcast
DWLE	15	479.143 MHz	7.02	GTV	GTV	4:3 480i	5 kW	Santiago	GMA Network, Inc.	M-S 5:30 AM - 12:00 AM; Su 6:00 AM - 12:00 AM	Commercial Broadcast
DWLE	15	479.143 MHz	7.03	HEART OF ASIA	Heart of Asia	4:3 480i	5 kW	Santiago	GMA Network, Inc.	M-Su 6:00 AM - 12:00 AM	Commercial Broadcast
DWLE	15	479.143 MHz	7.06	I HEART MOVIES	I Heart Movies	4:3 480i	5 kW	Santiago	GMA Network, Inc.	M-Su 6:00 AM - 12:00 AM	Commercial Broadcast
DWLE	15	479.143 MHz	7.21	GMA 1-Seg	GMA	4:3 240p	5 kW	Santiago	GMA Network, Inc.	M-F 5:30 AM - 12:30 AM; S-Su 5:30 AM - 12:00 AM	1seg
PA	16	485.143 MHz	2.01	ALLTV HD	ALLTV2	16:9 1080i	1 kW	Santiago	Advanced Media Broadcasting System, Inc.	M-F 5:30 AM - 11:15 PM; S 5:30 AM - 12:00 AM; Su 6:00 AM - 12:45 AM	Test Broadcast
DWDH	18	497.143 MHz	5.01	TV5	TV5	16:9 480i	10 kW	Santiago	Cignal TV, Inc. (Mediascape, Inc.)	M-F 4:30 AM - 1:00 AM; S 7:00 AM - 1:30 AM; Su 5:30 AM - 1:30 AM	Commercial Broadcast
DWDH	18	497.143 MHz	5.02	RPTV	RPTV	16:9 480i	10 kW	Santiago	Cignal TV, Inc. (Mediascape, Inc.)	M-Su 6:00 AM - 12:00 AM	Commercial Broadcast
DWDH	18	497.143 MHz	5.03	One Sports	One Sports	16:9 480i	10 kW	Santiago	Cignal TV, Inc. (Mediascape, Inc.)	M-S 5:00 AM - 12:30 AM; Su 6:00 AM - 12:00 AM	Commercial Broadcast
DWDH	18	497.143 MHz	5.35	One Seg S1	TV5	16:9 96p	10 kW	Santiago	Cignal TV, Inc. (Mediascape, Inc.)	M-F 4:30 AM - 1:00 AM; S 7:00 AM - 1:30 AM; Su 5:30 AM - 1:30 AM	1seg

== Central Luzon (Region III) ==
=== Bulacan ===
Callsign	Channel	Frequency	LCN	Name	Programming	Format	Power	Location	Company	Airtime	Notes
DWAU	34	593.143 MHz	2.01	ALLTV HD	ALLTV2	16:9 1080i	5 kW	San Miguel	Advanced Media Broadcasting System, Inc.	M-F 5:30 AM - 11:15 PM; S 5:30 AM - 12:00 AM; Su 6:00 AM - 12:45 AM	Commercial Broadcast

=== Nueva Ecija ===
Callsign	Channel	Frequency	LCN	Name	Programming	Format	Power	Location	Company	Airtime	Notes
PA	46	665.143 MHz	25.01	NET25	NET25	16:9 1080i	1 kW	Palayan	Eagle Broadcasting Corporation	M-Su 4:00 AM - 12:00 AM	Test Broadcast
PA	46	665.143 MHz	25.02	INCTV	INCTV	16:9 1080i	1 kW	Palayan	Eagle Broadcasting Corporation	M-Su 4:00 AM - 12:00 AM	Test Broadcast

=== Pampanga ===
Callsign	Channel	Frequency	LCN	Name	Programming	Format	Power	Location	Company	Airtime	Notes
DWAP	34	593.143 MHz	2.01	ALLTV HD	ALLTV2	16:9 1080i	5 kW	San Fernando	Advanced Media Broadcasting System, Inc.	M-F 5:30 AM - 11:15 PM; S 5:30 AM - 12:00 AM; Su 6:00 AM - 12:45 AM	Commercial Broadcast
DWRW	36	605.143 MHz	36.01	CLTV36	CLTV36	16:9 1080i	2.5 kW	San Fernando	RadioWorld Broadcasting Corporation	M-Su 9:00 AM - 10:00 PM	Commercial Broadcast
DWRW	36	605.143 MHz	36.02	RBC TEST BROADCAST	CLTV36	16:9 1080i	2.5 kW	San Fernando	RadioWorld Broadcasting Corporation	M-Su 9:00 AM - 10:00 PM	Test Broadcast
DWFU	44	653.143 MHz	44.01	GNN	GNN	16:9 480i	1 kW	San Fernando	Global Satellite Technology Services, Inc.	M-Su 5:00 AM - 12:00 AM	Commercial Broadcast
DWFU	44	653.143 MHz	44.02	GNN Central Luzon	—N/a	16:9 480i	1 kW	San Fernando	Global Satellite Technology Services, Inc.	M-Su 5:00 AM - 12:00 AM	Test Broadcast
DWFU	44	653.143 MHz	44.03	Hope Phil	Hope Channel	16:9 480i	1 kW	San Fernando	Global Satellite Technology Services, Inc.	M-Su 5:00 AM - 12:00 AM	Commercial Broadcast

=== Tarlac ===
Callsign	Channel	Frequency	LCN	Name	Programming	Format	Power	Location	Company	Airtime	Notes
PA	18	497.143 MHz	5.01	TV5	TV5	16:9 480i	5 kW	Capas	Cignal TV, Inc. (Mediascape, Inc.)	M-F 4:30 AM - 1:00 AM; S 7:00 AM - 1:30 AM; Su 5:30 AM - 1:30 AM	Commercial Broadcast
PA	18	497.143 MHz	5.02	RPTV	RPTV	16:9 480i	5 kW	Capas	Cignal TV, Inc. (Mediascape, Inc.)	M-Su 6:00 AM - 12:00 AM	Commercial Broadcast
PA	18	497.143 MHz	5.03	One Sports	One Sports	16:9 480i	5 kW	Capas	Cignal TV, Inc. (Mediascape, Inc.)	M-S 5:00 AM - 12:30 AM; Su 6:00 AM - 12:00 AM	Commercial Broadcast
PA	18	497.143 MHz	5.35	One Seg S1	TV5	16:9 96p	5 kW	Capas	Cignal TV, Inc. (Mediascape, Inc.)	M-F 4:30 AM - 1:00 AM; S 7:00 AM - 1:30 AM; Su 5:30 AM - 1:30 AM	1seg
DWAL	34	593.143 MHz	2.01	ALLTV HD	ALLTV2	16:9 1080i	5 kW	Tarlac City	Advanced Media Broadcasting System, Inc.	M-F 5:30 AM - 11:15 PM; S 5:30 AM - 12:00 AM; Su 6:00 AM - 12:45 AM	Commercial Broadcast

=== Zambales ===
Callsign	Channel	Frequency	LCN	Name	Programming	Format	Power	Location	Company	Airtime	Notes
PA	18	497.143 MHz	5.01	TV5	TV5	16:9 480i	5 kW	Olongapo	Interactive Broadcast Media, Inc.	M-F 4:30 AM - 1:00 AM; S 7:00 AM - 1:30 AM; Su 5:30 AM - 1:30 AM	Commercial Broadcast
PA	18	497.143 MHz	5.02	RPTV	RPTV	16:9 480i	5 kW	Olongapo	Interactive Broadcast Media, Inc.	M-Su 6:00 AM - 12:00 AM	Commercial Broadcast
PA	18	497.143 MHz	5.03	One Sports	One Sports	16:9 480i	5 kW	Olongapo	Interactive Broadcast Media, Inc.	M-S 5:00 AM - 12:30 AM; Su 6:00 AM - 12:00 AM	Commercial Broadcast
PA	18	497.143 MHz	5.35	One Seg S1	TV5	16:9 96p	5 kW	Olongapo	Interactive Broadcast Media, Inc.	M-F 4:30 AM - 1:00 AM; S 7:00 AM - 1:30 AM; Su 5:30 AM - 1:30 AM	1seg
DWNS	38	617.143 MHz	10.01	GMA	GMA	4:3 480i	5 kW	Olongapo	GMA Network, Inc.	M-F 5:30 AM - 12:30 AM; S-Su 5:30 AM - 12:00 AM	Commercial Broadcast
DWNS	38	617.143 MHz	10.02	GTV	GTV	4:3 480i	5 kW	Olongapo	GMA Network, Inc.	M-S 5:30 AM - 12:00 AM; Su 6:00 AM - 12:00 AM	Commercial Broadcast
DWNS	38	617.143 MHz	10.03	HEART OF ASIA	Heart of Asia	4:3 480i	5 kW	Olongapo	GMA Network, Inc.	M-Su 6:00 AM - 12:00 AM	Commercial Broadcast
DWNS	38	617.143 MHz	10.06	I HEART MOVIES	I Heart Movies	4:3 480i	5 kW	Olongapo	GMA Network, Inc.	M-Su 6:00 AM - 12:00 AM	Commercial Broadcast
DWNS	38	617.143 MHz	10.21	GMA 1-Seg	GMA	4:3 240p	5 kW	Olongapo	GMA Network, Inc.	M-F 5:30 AM - 12:30 AM; S-Su 5:30 AM - 12:00 AM	1seg

== CALABARZON (Region IV-A) ==
=== Batangas ===
Callsign	Channel	Frequency	LCN	Name	Programming	Format	Power	Location	Company	Airtime	Notes
PA	17	491.143 MHz	17.01	IBC13	IBC	16:9 1080i	5 kW	Batangas City	Intercontinental Broadcasting Corporation	M-F 5:30 AM - 11:00 PM; S-Su 7:00 AM - 10:00 PM	Test Broadcast
PA	17	491.143 MHz	17.02	Congress TV	Congress TV	16:9 1080i	5 kW	Batangas City	Intercontinental Broadcasting Corporation	M-Su 9:00 AM - 9:00 PM	Test Broadcast
D-12-ZB	32	581.143 MHz	12.01	GMA	GMA	4:3 480i	5 kW	Mt. Banoy	GMA Network, Inc.	M-F 5:30 AM - 12:30 AM; S-Su 5:30 AM - 12:00 AM	Commercial Broadcast
D-12-ZB	32	581.143 MHz	12.02	GTV	GTV	4:3 480i	5 kW	Mt. Banoy	GMA Network, Inc.	M-S 5:30 AM - 12:00 AM; Su 6:00 AM - 12:00 AM	Commercial Broadcast
D-12-ZB	32	581.143 MHz	12.03	HEART OF ASIA	Heart of Asia	4:3 480i	5 kW	Mt. Banoy	GMA Network, Inc.	M-Su 6:00 AM - 12:00 AM	Commercial Broadcast
D-12-ZB	32	581.143 MHz	12.06	I HEART MOVIES	I Heart Movies	4:3 480i	5 kW	Mt. Banoy	GMA Network, Inc.	M-Su 6:00 AM - 12:00 AM	Commercial Broadcast
D-12-ZB	32	581.143 MHz	12.21	GMA 1-Seg	GMA	4:3 240p	5 kW	Mt. Banoy	GMA Network, Inc.	M-F 5:30 AM - 12:30 AM; S-Su 5:30 AM - 12:00 AM	1seg
DWAG	36	605.143 MHz	36.01	PRTV PRIME	PRTV Prime Media	4:3 480i	1 kW	Mt. Banoy	Sphere Entertainment, Inc.	M-F 6:00 AM - 12:00 AM; S 6:00 AM - 10:00 AM; Su 6:00 AM - 12:00 AM	Commercial Broadcast
DWAG	36	605.143 MHz	36.02	KNOWLEDGE CHANNEL	Knowledge Channel	4:3 480i	1 kW	Mt. Banoy	Sphere Entertainment, Inc.	M-Su 6:00 AM - 11:00 PM	Commercial Broadcast
DWAG	36	605.143 MHz	36.03	RESERVED	(SMPTE Color Bars)	4:3 480i	1 kW	Mt. Banoy	Sphere Entertainment, Inc.	M-Su 6:00 AM - 12:00 AM	Test Broadcast
DWAG	36	605.143 MHz	36.04	BILYONARYO NEWS CHANNEL	Bilyonaryo News Channel	4:3 480i	1 kW	Mt. Banoy	Sphere Entertainment, Inc.	M-Su 6:00 AM - 12:00 AM	Commercial Broadcast
DWAG	36	605.143 MHz	36.05	D8TV	D8TV	4:3 480i	1 kW	Mt. Banoy	Sphere Entertainment, Inc.	M-Su 6:00 AM - 12:00 AM	Commercial Broadcast
DWAD	46	665.143 MHz	2.01	ALLTV HD	ALLTV2	16:9 1080i	10 kW	Mt. Banoy	Advanced Media Broadcasting System, Inc.	M-F 5:30 AM - 11:15 PM; S 5:30 AM - 12:00 AM; Su 6:00 AM - 12:45 AM	Commercial Broadcast
DWMD	51	695.143 MHz	5.01	TV5	TV5	16:9 480i	10 kW	Batangas City	TV5 Network, Inc.	M-F 4:30 AM - 1:00 AM; S 7:00 AM - 1:30 AM; Su 5:30 AM - 1:30 AM	Commercial Broadcast
DWMD	51	695.143 MHz	5.02	RPTV	RPTV	16:9 480i	10 kW	Batangas City	TV5 Network, Inc.	M-Su 6:00 AM - 12:00 AM	Commercial Broadcast
DWMD	51	695.143 MHz	5.03	One Sports	One Sports	16:9 480i	10 kW	Batangas City	TV5 Network, Inc.	M-S 5:00 AM - 12:30 AM; Su 6:00 AM - 12:00 AM	Commercial Broadcast
DWMD	51	695.143 MHz	5.35	One Seg S1	TV5	16:9 96p	10 kW	Batangas City	TV5 Network, Inc.	M-F 4:30 AM - 1:00 AM; S 7:00 AM - 1:30 AM; Su 5:30 AM - 1:30 AM	1seg

=== Laguna ===
Callsign	Channel	Frequency	LCN	Name	Programming	Format	Power	Location	Company	Airtime	Notes
PA	25	539.143 MHz	25.01	NET25	NET25	16:9 1080i	1 kW	Alaminos	Eagle Broadcasting Corporation	M-Su 4:00 AM - 12:00 AM	Commercial Broadcast
PA	25	539.143 MHz	25.02	INCTV	INCTV	16:9 1080i	1 kW	Alaminos	Eagle Broadcasting Corporation	M-Su 4:00 AM - 12:00 AM	Commercial Broadcast
DWAV	46	665.143 MHz	2.01	ALLTV HD	ALLTV2	16:9 1080i	5 kW	San Pablo	Advanced Media Broadcasting System, Inc.	M-F 5:30 AM - 11:15 PM; S 5:30 AM - 12:00 AM; Su 6:00 AM - 12:45 AM	Commercial Broadcast

=== Quezon Province ===
Callsign	Channel	Frequency	LCN	Name	Programming	Format	Power	Location	Company	Airtime	Notes
PA	18	497.143 MHz	5.01	TV5	TV5	16:9 480i	5 kW	Lucena	TV5 Network, Inc.	M-F 4:30 AM - 1:00 AM; S 7:00 AM - 1:30 AM; Su 5:30 AM - 1:30 AM	Commercial Broadcast
PA	18	497.143 MHz	5.02	RPTV	RPTV	16:9 480i	5 kW	Lucena	TV5 Network, Inc.	M-Su 6:00 AM - 12:00 AM	Commercial Broadcast
PA	18	497.143 MHz	5.03	One Sports	One Sports	16:9 480i	5 kW	Lucena	TV5 Network, Inc.	M-S 5:00 AM - 12:30 AM; Su 6:00 AM - 12:00 AM	Commercial Broadcast
PA	18	497.143 MHz	5.35	One Seg S1	TV5	16:9 96p	5 kW	Lucena	TV5 Network, Inc.	M-F 4:30 AM - 1:00 AM; S 7:00 AM - 1:30 AM; Su 5:30 AM - 1:30 AM	1seg
PA	51	695.143 MHz	25.01	NET25	NET25	16:9 1080i	1 kW	Lucena	Eagle Broadcasting Corporation	M-Su 4:00 AM - 12:00 AM	Commercial Broadcast
PA	51	695.143 MHz	25.02	INCTV	INCTV	16:9 1080i	1 kW	Lucena	Eagle Broadcasting Corporation	M-Su 4:00 AM - 12:00 AM	Commercial Broadcast

=== Rizal ===
Callsign	Channel	Frequency	LCN	Name	Programming	Format	Power	Location	Company	Airtime	Notes
PA	16	485.143 MHz	2.01	ALLTV HD	ALLTV2	16:9 1080i	5 kW	Jalajala	Advanced Media Broadcasting System, Inc.	M-F 5:30 AM - 11:15 PM; S 5:30 AM - 12:00 AM; Su 6:00 AM - 12:45 AM	Commercial Broadcast

== MIMAROPA (Region IV-B) ==
=== Occidental Mindoro ===
Callsign	Channel	Frequency	LCN	Name	Programming	Format	Power	Location	Company	Airtime	Notes
D-13-ZR	15	479.143 MHz	13.01	GMA	GMA	4:3 480i	5 kW	San Jose	GMA Network, Inc.	M-S 5:30 AM - 12:30 AM; Su 5:30 AM - 12:00 AM	Commercial Broadcast
D-13-ZR	15	479.143 MHz	13.02	GTV	GTV	4:3 480i	5 kW	San Jose	GMA Network, Inc.	M-Su 5:30 AM - 12:00 AM	Commercial Broadcast
D-13-ZR	15	479.143 MHz	13.03	HEART OF ASIA	Heart of Asia	4:3 480i	5 kW	San Jose	GMA Network, Inc.	M-Su 6:00 AM - 12:00 AM	Commercial Broadcast
D-13-ZR	15	479.143 MHz	13.06	I HEART MOVIES	I Heart Movies	4:3 480i	5 kW	San Jose	GMA Network, Inc.	M-Su 6:00 AM - 12:00 AM	Commercial Broadcast
D-13-ZR	15	479.143 MHz	13.21	GMA 1-Seg	GMA	4:3 240p	5 kW	San Jose	GMA Network, Inc.	M-S 5:30 AM - 12:30 AM; Su 5:30 AM - 12:00 AM	1seg
PA	18	497.143 MHz	5.01	TV5	TV5	16:9 480i	5 kW	San Jose	TV5 Network, Inc.	M-F 4:30 AM - 1:00 AM; S 7:00 AM - 1:30 AM; Su 5:30 AM - 1:30 AM	Commercial Broadcast
PA	18	497.143 MHz	5.02	RPTV	RPTV	16:9 480i	5 kW	San Jose	TV5 Network, Inc.	M-Su 6:00 AM - 12:00 AM	Commercial Broadcast
PA	18	497.143 MHz	5.03	One Sports	One Sports	16:9 480i	5 kW	San Jose	TV5 Network, Inc.	M-S 5:00 AM - 12:30 AM; Su 6:00 AM - 1:00 AM	Commercial Broadcast
PA	18	497.143 MHz	5.35	One Seg S1	TV5	16:9 96p	5 kW	San Jose	TV5 Network, Inc.	M-F 4:30 AM - 1:00 AM; S 7:00 AM - 1:30 AM; Su 5:30 AM - 1:30 AM	1seg

=== Palawan ===
Callsign	Channel	Frequency	LCN	Name	Programming	Format	Power	Location	Company	Airtime	Notes
DYPU	15	479.143 MHz	12.01	GMA	GMA	4:3 480i	10 kW	Puerto Princesa	GMA Network, Inc.	M-S 5:30 AM - 12:30 AM; Su 5:30 AM - 12:00 AM	Commercial Broadcast
DYPU	15	479.143 MHz	12.02	GTV	GTV	4:3 480i	10 kW	Puerto Princesa	GMA Network, Inc.	M-Su 5:30 AM - 12:00 AM	Commercial Broadcast
DYPU	15	479.143 MHz	12.03	HEART OF ASIA	Heart of Asia	4:3 480i	10 kW	Puerto Princesa	GMA Network, Inc.	M-Su 6:00 AM - 12:00 AM	Commercial Broadcast
DYPU	15	479.143 MHz	12.06	I HEART MOVIES	I Heart Movies	4:3 480i	10 kW	Puerto Princesa	GMA Network, Inc.	M-Su 6:00 AM - 12:00 AM	Commercial Broadcast
DYPU	15	479.143 MHz	12.21	GMA 1-Seg	GMA	4:3 240p	10 kW	Puerto Princesa	GMA Network, Inc.	M-S 5:30 AM - 12:30 AM; Su 5:30 AM - 12:00 AM	1seg
DWDD	18	497.143 MHz	5.01	TV5	TV5	16:9 480i	5 kW	Puerto Princesa	Nation Broadcasting Corporation	M-F 4:30 AM - 1:00 AM; S 7:00 AM - 1:30 AM; Su 5:30 AM - 1:30 AM	Commercial Broadcast
DWDD	18	497.143 MHz	5.02	RPTV	RPTV	16:9 480i	5 kW	Puerto Princesa	Nation Broadcasting Corporation	M-Su 6:00 AM - 12:00 AM	Commercial Broadcast
DWDD	18	497.143 MHz	5.03	One Sports	One Sports	16:9 480i	5 kW	Puerto Princesa	Nation Broadcasting Corporation	M-S 5:00 AM - 12:30 AM; Su 6:00 AM - 1:00 AM	Commercial Broadcast
DWDD	18	497.143 MHz	5.35	One Seg S1	TV5	16:9 96p	5 kW	Puerto Princesa	Nation Broadcasting Corporation	M-F 4:30 AM - 1:00 AM; S 7:00 AM - 1:30 AM; Su 5:30 AM - 1:30 AM	1seg

== Bicol Region (Region V) ==
=== Albay ===
Callsign	Channel	Frequency	LCN	Name	Programming	Format	Power	Location	Company	Airtime	Notes
PA	17	491.143 MHz	17.01	IBC13	IBC 13	16:9 1080i	5 kW	Legazpi	Intercontinental Broadcasting Corporation	M-F 5:30 AM - 11:00 PM; S-Su 7:00 AM - 10:00 PM	Commercial Broadcast
PA	17	491.143 MHz	17.02	Congress TV	Congress TV	16:9 1080i	5 kW	Legazpi	Intercontinental Broadcasting Corporation	M-Su 9:00 AM - 9:00 PM	Commercial Broadcast
DWLB	18	497.143 MHz	5.01	TV5	TV5	16:9 480i	10 kW	Legazpi	Cignal TV, Inc. (Mediascape, Inc.)	M-F 4:30 AM - 1:00 AM; S 7:00 AM - 1:30 AM; Su 5:30 AM - 1:30 AM	Commercial Broadcast
DWLB	18	497.143 MHz	5.02	RPTV	RPTV	16:9 480i	10 kW	Legazpi	Cignal TV, Inc. (Mediascape, Inc.)	M-Su 6:00 AM - 12:00 AM	Commercial Broadcast
DWLB	18	497.143 MHz	5.03	One Sports	One Sports	16:9 480i	10 kW	Legazpi	Cignal TV, Inc. (Mediascape, Inc.)	M-S 5:00 AM - 12:30 AM; Su 6:00 AM - 12:00 AM	Commercial Broadcast
DWLB	18	497.143 MHz	5.35	One Seg S1	TV5	16:9 96p	10 kW	Legazpi	Cignal TV, Inc. (Mediascape, Inc.)	M-F 4:30 AM - 1:00 AM; S 7:00 AM - 1:30 AM; Su 5:30 AM - 1:30 AM	1seg
PA	33	587.143 MHz	33.01	PRTV PRIME	PRTV Prime Media	4:3 480i	2.5 kW	Legazpi	Broadcast Enterprises and Affiliated Media, Inc.	M-F 6:00 AM - 12:00 AM; S 6:00 AM - 10:00 AM; Su 6:00 AM - 12:00 AM	Commercial Broadcast
PA	33	587.143 MHz	33.02	KNOWLEDGE CHANNEL	Knowledge Channel	4:3 480i	2.5 kW	Legazpi	Broadcast Enterprises and Affiliated Media, Inc.	M-Su 6:00 AM - 11:00 PM	Commercial Broadcast
PA	33	587.143 MHz	33.03	RESERVED	(SMPTE Color Bars)	4:3 480i	2.5 kW	Legazpi	Broadcast Enterprises and Affiliated Media, Inc.	M-Su 6:00 AM - 12:00 AM	Test Broadcast
PA	33	587.143 MHz	33.04	BILYONARYO NEWS CHANNEL	Bilyonaryo News Channel	4:3 480i	2.5 kW	Legazpi	Broadcast Enterprises and Affiliated Media, Inc.	M-Su 6:00 AM - 12:00 AM	Commercial Broadcast
PA	33	587.143 MHz	33.05	D8TV	D8TV	4:3 480i	2.5 kW	Legazpi	Broadcast Enterprises and Affiliated Media, Inc.	M-Su 6:00 AM - 12:00 AM	Commercial Broadcast
DWLA	41	635.143 MHz	12.01	GMA	GMA	4:3 480i	10 kW	Legazpi	GMA Network, Inc.	M-F 5:30 AM - 12:30 AM; S-Su 5:30 AM - 12:00 AM	Commercial Broadcast
DWLA	41	635.143 MHz	12.02	GTV	GTV	4:3 480i	10 kW	Legazpi	GMA Network, Inc.	M-S 5:30 AM - 12:00 AM; Su 6:00 AM - 12:00 AM	Commercial Broadcast
DWLA	41	635.143 MHz	12.03	HEART OF ASIA	Heart of Asia	4:3 480i	10 kW	Legazpi	GMA Network, Inc.	M-Su 6:00 AM - 12:00 AM	Commercial Broadcast
DWLA	41	635.143 MHz	12.06	I HEART MOVIES	I Heart Movies	4:3 480i	10 kW	Legazpi	GMA Network, Inc.	M-Su 6:00 AM - 12:00 AM	Commercial Broadcast
DWLA	41	635.143 MHz	12.21	GMA 1-Seg	GMA	4:3 240p	10 kW	Legazpi	GMA Network, Inc.	M-F 5:30 AM - 12:30 AM; S-Su 5:30 AM - 12:00 AM	1seg

=== Camarines Sur ===
Callsign	Channel	Frequency	LCN	Name	Programming	Format	Power	Location	Company	Airtime	Notes
PA	17	491.143 MHz	50.01	IBC13	IBC	16:9 1080i	5 kW	Naga	Intercontinental Broadcasting Corporation	M-F 5:30 AM - 11:00 PM; S-Su 7:00 AM - 10:00 PM	Commercial Broadcast
PA	17	491.143 MHz	50.02	Congress TV	Congress TV	16:9 1080i	5 kW	Naga	Intercontinental Broadcasting Corporation	M-Su 9:00 AM - 9:00 PM	Commercial Broadcast
DWHC	32	571.143 MHz	32.01	PRTV Prime	PRTV Prime Media	4:3 480i	5 kW	Naga	Broadcast Enterprises and Affiliated Media, Inc.	M-F 6:00 AM - 12:00 AM; S 6:00 AM - 10:00 AM; Su 6:00 AM - 12:00 AM	Commercial Broadcast
DWHC	32	571.143 MHz	32.03	Knowledge Channel	Knowledge Channel	4:3 480i	5 kW	Naga	Broadcast Enterprises and Affiliated Media, Inc.	M-Su 6:00 AM - 11:00 PM	Commercial Broadcast
DWHC	32	571.143 MHz	32.04	RESERVED	(SMPTE Color Bars)	4:3 480i	5 kW	Naga	Broadcast Enterprises and Affiliated Media, Inc.	M-Su 6:00 AM - 12:00 AM	Test Broadcast
DWHC	32	571.143 MHz	32.05	BILYONARYO NEWS CHANNEL	Bilyonaryo News Channel	4:3 480i	5 kW	Naga	Broadcast Enterprises and Affiliated Media, Inc.	M-Su 6:00 AM - 12:00 AM	Commercial Broadcast
DWHC	32	571.143 MHz	32.07	D8TV	D8TV	4:3 480i	5 kW	Naga	Broadcast Enterprises and Affiliated Media, Inc.	M-Su 6:00 AM - 12:00 AM	Commercial Broadcast
DWAI	38	617.143 MHz	7.01	GMA	GMA	4:3 480i	10 kW	Naga	GMA Network, Inc.	M-F 5:30 AM - 12:30 AM; S-Su 5:30 AM - 12:00 AM	Commercial Broadcast
DWAI	38	617.143 MHz	7.02	GTV	GTV	4:3 480i	10 kW	Naga	GMA Network, Inc.	M-S 5:30 AM - 12:00 AM; Su 6:00 AM - 12:00 AM	Commercial Broadcast
DWAI	38	617.143 MHz	7.03	HEART OF ASIA	Heart of Asia	4:3 480i	10 kW	Naga	GMA Network, Inc.	M-Su 6:00 AM - 12:00 AM	Commercial Broadcast
DWAI	38	617.143 MHz	7.06	I HEART MOVIES	I Heart Movies	4:3 480i	10 kW	Naga	GMA Network, Inc.	M-Su 6:00 AM - 12:00 AM	Commercial Broadcast
DWAI	38	617.143 MHz	7.21	GMA 1-Seg	GMA	4:3 240p	10 kW	Naga	GMA Network, Inc.	M-F 5:30 AM - 12:30 AM; S-Su 5:30 AM - 12:00 AM	1seg
PA	47	671.143 MHz	25.01	NET25	NET25	16:9 1080i	1 kW	Naga	Eagle Broadcasting Corporation	M-Su 4:00 AM - 12:00 AM	Commercial Broadcast
PA	47	671.143 MHz	25.02	INCTV	INCTV	16:9 1080i	1 kW	Naga	Eagle Broadcasting Corporation	M-Su 4:00 AM - 12:00 AM	Commercial Broadcast
DWFA	48	677.143 MHz	48.01	Tiger48 TV	GNN	16:9 1080i	1 kW	Naga	Global Satellite Technology Services, Inc.	M-Su 6:00 AM - 12:00 AM	Test Broadcast
DWFA	48	677.143 MHz	48.02	GNN Manila	—N/a	—N/a	1 kW	Naga	Global Satellite Technology Services, Inc.	M-Su 6:00 AM - 12:00 AM	Test Broadcast
DWFA	48	677.143 MHz	48.03	Tiger FM	—N/a	—N/a	1 kW	Naga	Global Satellite Technology Services, Inc.	M-Su 6:00 AM - 12:00 AM	Test Broadcast
DWFA	48	677.143 MHz	48.04	Island Living	—N/a	—N/a	1 kW	Naga	Global Satellite Technology Services, Inc.	M-Su 6:00 AM - 12:00 AM	Test Broadcast
PA	50	689.143 MHz	50.01	Tele-Radyo	CSPC TV	16:9 1080i	1 kW	Nabua	Philippine Collective Media Corporation	M-Su 9:00 AM - 8:00 PM	Test Broadcast
PA	50	689.143 MHz	50.02	RIC/TESDA	—N/a	—N/a	1 kW	Nabua	Philippine Collective Media Corporation	M-Su 9:00 AM - 8:00 PM	Test Broadcast
PA	50	689.143 MHz	50.03	GEC	—N/a	—N/a	1 kW	Nabua	Philippine Collective Media Corporation	M-Su 9:00 AM - 8:00 PM	Test Broadcast
PA	50	689.143 MHz	50.04	GEC Electives	—N/a	—N/a	1 kW	Nabua	Philippine Collective Media Corporation	M-Su 9:00 AM - 8:00 PM	Test Broadcast

=== Masbate ===
Callsign	Channel	Frequency	LCN	Name	Programming	Format	Power	Location	Company	Airtime	Notes
DYME	17	491.143 MHz	17.01	IBC13	IBC 13	16:9 1080i	1 kW	Masbate City	Masbate Communication Broadcasting Company	M-F 5:30 AM - 11:00 PM; S-Su 7:00 AM - 10:00 PM	Test Broadcast
DYME	17	491.143 MHz	17.02	Congress TV	Congress TV	16:9 1080i	1 kW	Masbate City	Masbate Communication Broadcasting Company	9:00 AM - 9:00 PM	Test Broadcast

== Western Visayas (Region VI) ==
=== Aklan ===
Callsign	Channel	Frequency	LCN	Name	Programming	Format	Power	Location	Company	Airtime	Notes
PA	18	497.143 MHz	5.01	TV5	TV5	16:9 480i	10 kW	Kalibo	Interactive Broadcast Media, Inc.	M-F 4:30 AM - 1:00 AM; S 7:00 AM - 1:30 AM; Su 5:30 AM - 1:30 AM	Commercial Broadcast
PA	18	497.143 MHz	5.02	RPTV	RPTV	16:9 480i	10 kW	Kalibo	Interactive Broadcast Media, Inc.	M-Su 6:00 AM - 12:00 AM	Commercial Broadcast
PA	18	497.143 MHz	5.03	One Sports	One Sports	16:9 480i	10 kW	Kalibo	Interactive Broadcast Media, Inc.	M-S 5:00 AM - 12:30 AM; Su 6:00 AM - 12:00 AM	Commercial Broadcast
PA	18	497.143 MHz	5.35	One Seg S1	TV5	16:9 96p	10 kW	Kalibo	Interactive Broadcast Media, Inc.	M-F 4:30 AM - 1:00 AM; S 7:00 AM - 1:30 AM; Su 5:30 AM - 1:30 AM	1seg

=== Capiz ===
Callsign	Channel	Frequency	LCN	Name	Programming	Format	Power	Location	Company	Airtime	Notes
DYAM	15	479.143 MHz	5.01	GMA	GMA	4:3 480i	5 kW	Roxas	GMA Network, Inc.	M-F 5:30 AM - 12:30 AM; S-Su 5:30 AM - 12:00 AM	Commercial Broadcast
DYAM	15	479.143 MHz	5.02	GTV	GTV	4:3 480i	5 kW	Roxas	GMA Network, Inc.	M-S 5:30 AM - 12:00 AM; Su 6:00 AM - 12:00 AM	Commercial Broadcast
DYAM	15	479.143 MHz	5.03	HEART OF ASIA	Heart of Asia	4:3 480i	5 kW	Roxas	GMA Network, Inc.	M-Su 6:00 AM - 12:00 AM	Commercial Broadcast
DYAM	15	479.143 MHz	5.06	I HEART MOVIES	I Heart Movies	4:3 480i	5 kW	Roxas	GMA Network, Inc.	M-Su 6:00 AM - 12:00 AM	Commercial Broadcast
DYAM	15	479.143 MHz	5.21	GMA 1-Seg	GMA	4:3 240p	5 kW	Roxas	GMA Network, Inc.	M-F 5:30 AM - 12:30 AM; S-Su 5:30 AM - 12:00 AM	1seg

=== Iloilo–Guimaras ===
Callsign	Channel	Frequency	LCN	Name	Programming	Format	Power	Location	Company	Airtime	Notes
PA	16	485.143 MHz	2.01	ALLTV HD	ALLTV2	16:9 1080i	10 kW	Jordan	Advanced Media Broadcasting System, Inc.	M-F 5:30 AM - 11:15 PM; S 5:30 AM - 12:00 AM; Su 6:00 AM - 12:45 AM	Commercial Broadcast
DYJB	17	491.143 MHz	17.01	IBC13	IBC	16:9 1080i	7.5 kW	Jordan	Intercontinental Broadcasting Corporation	M-F 5:30 AM - 11:00 PM; S-Su 7:00 AM - 10:00 PM	Commercial Broadcast
DYJB	17	491.143 MHz	17.02	Congress TV	Congress TV	16:9 1080i	7.5 kW	Jordan	Intercontinental Broadcasting Corporation	M-Su 9:00 AM - 9:00 PM	Commercial Broadcast
DYMB	18	497.143 MHz	5.01	TV5	TV5	16:9 480i	10 kW	Jordan	Cignal TV, Inc. (Mediascape, Inc.)	M-F 4:30 AM - 1:00 AM; S 7:00 AM - 1:30 AM; Su 5:30 AM - 1:30 AM	Commercial Broadcast
DYMB	18	497.143 MHz	5.02	RPTV	RPTV	16:9 480i	10 kW	Jordan	Cignal TV, Inc. (Mediascape, Inc.)	M-Su 6:00 AM - 12:00 AM	Commercial Broadcast
DYMB	18	497.143 MHz	5.03	One Sports	One Sports	16:9 480i	10 kW	Jordan	Cignal TV, Inc. (Mediascape, Inc.)	M-S 5:00 AM - 12:30 AM; Su 6:00 AM - 12:00 AM	Commercial Broadcast
DYMB	18	497.143 MHz	5.35	One Seg S1	TV5	16:9 96p	10 kW	Jordan	Cignal TV, Inc. (Mediascape, Inc.)	M-F 4:30 AM - 1:00 AM; S 7:00 AM - 1:30 AM; Su 5:30 AM - 1:30 AM	1seg
DYZA	20	509.143 MHz	20.01	A2Z	A2Z	4:3 480i	5.5 kW	Jordan	Zoe Broadcasting Network, Inc.	M-F 5:00 AM - 12:15 AM; S 6:00 AM - 11:00 PM; Su 6:00 AM - 11:45 PM	Commercial Broadcast
DYZA	20	509.143 MHz	20.02	Light TV	Light TV	4:3 480i	5.5 kW	Jordan	Zoe Broadcasting Network, Inc.	M-Su 6:00 AM - 12:00 AM	Commercial Broadcast
DYZA	20	509.143 MHz	20.31	A2Z Oneseg	—N/a	—N/a	5.5 kW	Jordan	Zoe Broadcasting Network, Inc.	M-F 5:00 AM - 12:15 AM; S 6:00 AM - 11:00 PM; Su 6:00 AM - 11:45 PM	1Seg
DYRM	26	545.143 MHz	26.01	PRTV PRIME	PRTV Prime Media	4:3 480i	5 kW	Jordan	Broadcast Enterprises and Affiliated Media, Inc.	M-F 6:00 AM - 12:00 AM; S 6:00 AM - 10:00 AM; Su 6:00 AM - 12:00 AM	Commercial Broadcast
DYRM	26	545.143 MHz	26.02	KNOWLEDGE CHANNEL	Knowledge Channel	4:3 480i	5 kW	Jordan	Broadcast Enterprises and Affiliated Media, Inc.	M-Su 6:00 AM - 11:00 PM	Commercial Broadcast
DYRM	26	545.143 MHz	26.03	RESERVED	(SMPTE Color Bars)	4:3 480i	5 kW	Jordan	Broadcast Enterprises and Affiliated Media, Inc.	M-Su 6:00 AM - 12:00 AM	Test Broadcast
DYRM	26	545.143 MHz	26.04	BILYONARYO NEWS CHANNEL	Bilyonaryo News Channel	4:3 480i	5 kW	Jordan	Broadcast Enterprises and Affiliated Media, Inc.	M-Su 6:00 AM - 12:00 AM	Commercial Broadcast
DYRM	26	545.143 MHz	26.05	D8TV	D8TV	4:3 480i	5 kW	Jordan	Broadcast Enterprises and Affiliated Media, Inc.	M-Su 6:00 AM - 12:00 AM	Commercial Broadcast
DYXX	29	563.143 MHz	6.01	GMA	GMA	4:3 480i	10 kW	Jordan	GMA Network, Inc.	M-F 5:30 AM - 12:30 AM; S-Su 5:30 AM - 12:00 AM	Commercial Broadcast
DYXX	29	563.143 MHz	6.02	GTV	GTV	4:3 480i	10 kW	Jordan	GMA Network, Inc.	M-S 5:30 AM - 12:00 AM; Su 6:00 AM - 12:00 AM	Commercial Broadcast
DYXX	29	563.143 MHz	6.03	HEART OF ASIA	Heart of Asia	4:3 480i	10 kW	Jordan	GMA Network, Inc.	M-Su 6:00 AM - 12:00 AM	Commercial Broadcast
DYXX	29	563.143 MHz	6.06	I HEART MOVIES	I Heart Movies	4:3 480i	10 kW	Jordan	GMA Network, Inc.	M-Su 6:00 AM - 12:00 AM	Commercial Broadcast
DYXX	29	563.143 MHz	6.21	GMA 1-Seg	GMA	4:3 240p	10 kW	Jordan	GMA Network, Inc.	M-F 5:30 AM - 12:30 AM; S-Su 5:30 AM - 12:00 AM	1seg
DYOK	43	647.143 MHz	43.21	DZRH NEWS TV	RHTV	16:9 1080i	1.5 kW	Iloilo City	Manila Broadcasting Company	M-Su 12:00 AM - 12:01 AM	Commercial Broadcast
DYOK	43	647.143 MHz	43.31	DZRH NEWS 1SEG	RHTV	4:3 240p	1.5 kW	Iloilo City	Manila Broadcasting Company	M-Su 12:00 AM - 12:01 AM	1seg

== Negros Island Region (NIR) ==
=== Negros Occidental ===
Callsign	Channel	Frequency	LCN	Name	Programming	Format	Power	Location	Company	Airtime	Notes
DYGM	15	479.143 MHz	13.01	GMA	GMA	4:3 480i	10 kW	Murcia	GMA Network, Inc.	M-F 5:30 AM - 12:30 AM; S-Su 5:30 AM - 12:00 AM	Commercial Broadcast
DYGM	15	479.143 MHz	13.02	GTV	GTV	4:3 480i	10 kW	Murcia	GMA Network, Inc.	M-S 5:30 AM - 12:00 AM; Su 6:00 AM - 12:00 AM	Commercial Broadcast
DYGM	15	479.143 MHz	13.03	HEART OF ASIA	Heart of Asia	4:3 480i	10 kW	Murcia	GMA Network, Inc.	M-Su 6:00 AM - 12:00 AM	Commercial Broadcast
DYGM	15	479.143 MHz	13.06	I HEART MOVIES	I Heart Movies	4:3 480i	10 kW	Murcia	GMA Network, Inc.	M-Su 6:00 AM - 12:00 AM	Commercial Broadcast
DYGM	15	479.143 MHz	13.21	GMA 1-Seg	GMA	4:3 240p	10 kW	Murcia	GMA Network, Inc.	M-F 5:30 AM - 12:30 AM; S-Su 5:30 AM - 12:00 AM	1seg
DYAG	16	485.143 MHz	2.01	ALLTV HD	ALLTV2	16:9 1080i	10 kW	Bacolod	Advanced Media Broadcasting System, Inc.	M-F 5:30 AM - 11:15 PM; S 5:30 AM - 12:00 AM; Su 6:00 AM - 12:45 AM	Commercial Broadcast
DYTE	18	497.143 MHz	5.01	TV5	TV5	16:9 480i	10 kW	Bacolod	TV5 Network, Inc.	M-F 4:30 AM - 1:00 AM; S 7:00 AM - 1:30 AM; Su 5:30 AM - 1:30 AM	Commercial Broadcast
DYTE	18	497.143 MHz	5.02	RPTV	RPTV	16:9 480i	10 kW	Bacolod	TV5 Network, Inc.	M-Su 6:00 AM - 12:00 AM	Commercial Broadcast
DYTE	18	497.143 MHz	5.03	One Sports	One Sports	16:9 480i	10 kW	Bacolod	TV5 Network, Inc.	M-S 5:00 AM - 12:30 AM; Su 6:00 AM - 12:00 AM	Commercial Broadcast
DYTE	18	497.143 MHz	5.35	One Seg S1	TV5	16:9 96p	10 kW	Bacolod	TV5 Network, Inc.	M-F 4:30 AM - 1:00 AM; S 7:00 AM - 1:30 AM; Su 5:30 AM - 1:30 AM	1seg
DYEZ	39	623.143 MHz	39.01	DZRH NEWS TV	RHTV	16:9 1080i	1.5 kW	Bacolod	Manila Broadcasting Company	M-Su 12:00 AM - 11:59 PM	Commercial Broadcast
DYEZ	39	623.143 MHz	39.31	DZRH NEWS 1SEG	RHTV	4:3 240p	1.5 kW	Bacolod	Manila Broadcasting Company	M-Su 12:00 AM - 11:59 PM	1seg
DWGM	44	653.143 MHz	13.01	GMA	GMA	4:3 480i	10 kW	Bacolod	GMA Network, Inc.	M-F 5:30 AM - 12:30 AM; S-Su 5:30 AM - 12:00 AM	Commercial Broadcast
DWGM	44	653.143 MHz	13.02	GTV	GTV	4:3 480i	10 kW	Bacolod	GMA Network, Inc.	M-S 5:30 AM - 12:00 AM; Su 6:00 AM - 12:00 AM	Commercial Broadcast
DWGM	44	653.143 MHz	13.03	HEART OF ASIA	Heart of Asia	4:3 480i	10 kW	Bacolod	GMA Network, Inc.	M-Su 6:00 AM - 12:00 AM	Commercial Broadcast
DWGM	44	653.143 MHz	13.06	I HEART MOVIES	I Heart Movies	4:3 480i	10 kW	Bacolod	GMA Network, Inc.	M-Su 6:00 AM - 12:00 AM	Commercial Broadcast
DWGM	44	653.143 MHz	13.21	GMA 1-Seg	GMA	4:3 240p	10 kW	Bacolod	GMA Network, Inc.	M-F 5:30 AM - 12:30 AM; S-Su 5:30 AM - 12:00 AM	1seg

=== Negros Oriental ===
Callsign	Channel	Frequency	LCN	Name	Programming	Format	Power	Location	Company	Airtime	Notes
D-5-YB	22	521.143 MHz	5.01	GMA	GMA	4:3 480i	5 kW	Valencia	GMA Network, Inc.	M-F 5:30 AM - 12:30 AM; S-Su 5:30 AM - 12:00 AM	Commercial Broadcast
D-5-YB	22	521.143 MHz	5.02	GTV	GTV	4:3 480i	5 kW	Valencia	GMA Network, Inc.	M-S 5:30 AM - 12:00 AM; Su 6:00 AM - 12:00 AM	Commercial Broadcast
D-5-YB	22	521.143 MHz	5.03	HEART OF ASIA	Heart of Asia	4:3 480i	5 kW	Valencia	GMA Network, Inc.	M-Su 6:00 AM - 12:00 AM	Commercial Broadcast
D-5-YB	22	521.143 MHz	5.06	I HEART MOVIES	I Heart Movies	4:3 480i	5 kW	Valencia	GMA Network, Inc.	M-Su 6:00 AM - 12:00 AM	Commercial Broadcast
D-5-YB	22	521.143 MHz	5.21	GMA 1-Seg	GMA	4:3 240p	5 kW	Valencia	GMA Network, Inc.	M-F 5:30 AM - 12:30 AM; S-Su 5:30 AM - 12:00 AM	1seg

== Central Visayas (Region VII) ==
=== Bohol ===
Callsign	Channel	Frequency	LCN	Name	Programming	Format	Power	Location	Company	Airtime	Notes
PA	18	497.143 MHz	5.01	TV5	TV5	16:9 480i	3 kW	Tagbilaran	TV5 Network, Inc.	M-F 4:30 AM - 1:00 AM; S 7:00 AM - 1:30 AM; Su 5:30 AM - 1:30 AM	Test Broadcast
PA	18	497.143 MHz	5.02	RPTV	RPTV	16:9 480i	3 kW	Tagbilaran	TV5 Network, Inc.	M-Su 6:00 AM - 12:00 AM	Test Broadcast
PA	18	497.143 MHz	5.03	One Sports	One Sports	16:9 480i	3 kW	Tagbilaran	TV5 Network, Inc.	M-S 5:00 AM - 12:30 AM; Su 6:00 AM - 12:00 AM	Test Broadcast
PA	18	497.143 MHz	5.35	One Seg S1	TV5	16:9 96p	3 kW	Tagbilaran	TV5 Network, Inc.	M-F 4:30 AM - 1:00 AM; S 7:00 AM - 1:30 AM; Su 5:30 AM - 1:30 AM	1seg

=== Cebu ===
Callsign	Channel	Frequency	LCN	Name	Programming	Format	Power	Location	Company	Airtime	Notes
DYAE	16	485.143 MHz	2.01	ALLTV HD	ALLTV2	16:9 1080i	10 kW	Cebu City	Advanced Media Broadcasting System, Inc.	M-F 5:30 AM - 11:15 PM; S 5:30 AM - 12:00 AM; Su 6:00 AM - 12:45 AM	Commercial Broadcast
DYTV	17	491.143 MHz	13.02	IBC 13	IBC	16:9 1080i	5 kW	Cebu City	Intercontinental Broadcasting Corporation	M-F 5:30 AM - 11:00 PM; S-Su 7:00 AM - 10:00 PM	Commercial Broadcast
DYTV	17	491.143 MHz	13.03	Congress TV	Congress TV	16:9 1080i	5 kW	Cebu City	Intercontinental Broadcasting Corporation	M-Su 9:00 AM - 9:00 PM	Commercial Broadcast
DYET	18	497.143 MHz	5.01	TV5	TV5	16:9 480i	10 kW	Cebu City	TV5 Network, Inc.	M-F 4:30 AM - 1:00 AM; S 7:00 AM - 1:30 AM; Su 5:30 AM - 1:30 AM	Commercial Broadcast
DYET	18	497.143 MHz	5.02	RPTV	RPTV	16:9 480i	10 kW	Cebu City	TV5 Network, Inc.	M-Su 6:00 AM - 12:00 AM	Commercial Broadcast
DYET	18	497.143 MHz	5.03	One Sports	One Sports	16:9 480i	10 kW	Cebu City	TV5 Network, Inc.	M-S 5:00 AM - 12:30 AM; Su 6:00 AM - 12:00 AM	Commercial Broadcast
DYET	18	497.143 MHz	5.35	One Seg S1	TV5	16:9 96p	10 kW	Cebu City	TV5 Network, Inc.	M-F 4:30 AM - 1:00 AM; S 7:00 AM - 1:30 AM; Su 5:30 AM - 1:30 AM	1seg
DYNZ	20	509.143 MHz	20.01	A2Z	A2Z	4:3 480i	5.5 kW	Cebu City	Zoe Broadcasting Network, Inc.	M-F 5:00 AM - 12:15 AM; S 6:00 AM - 11:00 PM; Su 6:00 AM - 11:45 PM	Commercial Broadcast
DYNZ	20	509.143 MHz	20.02	Light TV	Light TV	4:3 480i	5.5 kW	Cebu City	Zoe Broadcasting Network, Inc.	M-Su 6:00 AM - 12:00 AM	Commercial Broadcast
DYNZ	20	509.143 MHz	20.31	A2Z Oneseg	—N/a	—N/a	5.5 kW	Cebu City	Zoe Broadcasting Network, Inc.	M-F 5:00 AM - 12:15 AM; S 6:00 AM - 11:00 PM; Su 6:00 AM - 11:45 PM	1seg
DYGA	25	539.143 MHz	25.01	Hope Cebu	Hope Channel	16:9 1080i	1.5 kW	Cebu City	Gateway UHF TV Broadcasting, Inc.	M-Su 6:00 AM - 12:00 AM	Commercial Broadcast
DYSS	26	545.143 MHz	7.01	GMA	GMA	4:3 480i	15 kW	Cebu City	GMA Network, Inc.	M-F 5:30 AM - 12:30 AM; S-Su 5:30 AM - 12:00 AM	Commercial Broadcast
DYSS	26	545.143 MHz	7.02	GTV	GTV	4:3 480i	15 kW	Cebu City	GMA Network, Inc.	M-S 5:30 AM - 12:00 AM; Su 6:00 AM - 12:00 AM	Commercial Broadcast
DYSS	26	545.143 MHz	7.03	HEART OF ASIA	Heart of Asia	4:3 480i	15 kW	Cebu City	GMA Network, Inc.	M-Su 6:00 AM - 12:00 AM	Commercial Broadcast
DYSS	26	545.143 MHz	7.06	I HEART MOVIES	I Heart Movies	4:3 480i	15 kW	Cebu City	GMA Network, Inc.	M-Su 6:00 AM - 12:00 AM	Commercial Broadcast
DYSS	26	545.143 MHz	7.21	GMA 1-Seg	GMA	4:3 240p	15 kW	Cebu City	GMA Network, Inc.	M-F 5:30 AM - 12:30 AM; S-Su 5:30 AM - 12:00 AM	1seg
DYCT	31	575.143 MHz	31.01	PRTV Prime	PRTV Prime Media	4:3 480i	5 kW	Cebu City	Broadcast Enterprises and Affiliated Media, Inc.	M-F 6:00 AM - 12:00 AM; S 6:00 AM - 10:00 AM; Su 6:00 AM - 12:00 AM	Commercial Broadcast
DYCT	31	575.143 MHz	31.02	KNOWLEDGE CHANNEL	Knowledge Channel	4:3 480i	5 kW	Cebu City	Broadcast Enterprises and Affiliated Media, Inc.	M-Su 6:00 AM - 11:00 PM	Commercial Broadcast
DYCT	31	575.143 MHz	31.03	RESERVED	(SMPTE Color Bars)	4:3 480i	5 kW	Cebu City	Broadcast Enterprises and Affiliated Media, Inc.	M-Su 6:00 AM - 12:00 AM	Test Broadcast
DYCT	31	575.143 MHz	31.04	BILYONARYO NEWS CHANNEL	Bilyonaryo News Channel	4:3 480i	5 kW	Cebu City	Broadcast Enterprises and Affiliated Media, Inc.	M-Su 6:00 AM - 12:00 AM	Commercial Broadcast
DYCT	31	575.143 MHz	31.05	D8TV	D8TV	4:3 480i	5 kW	Cebu City	Broadcast Enterprises and Affiliated Media, Inc.	M-Su 6:00 AM - 12:00 AM	Commercial Broadcast
DYPT	42	641.143 MHz	4.01	PTV	PTV	16:9 480i	2.5 kW	Cebu City	People's Television Network, Inc.	M-F 5:30 AM - 12:00 AM; S-Su 7:00 AM - 12:00 AM	Commercial Broadcast
DYPT	42	641.143 MHz	4.02	PTV SPORTS	PTV Sports	16:9 480i	2.5 kW	Cebu City	People's Television Network, Inc.	M-F 5:30 AM - 12:00 AM; S-Su 7:00 AM - 12:00 AM	Commercial Broadcast
DYPT	42	641.143 MHz	4.03	PTV HD	(SMPTE Color Bars)	16:9 1080i	2.5 kW	Cebu City	People's Television Network, Inc.	M-F 5:30 AM - 12:00 AM; S-Su 7:00 AM - 12:00 AM	Test Broadcast
DYPT	42	641.143 MHz	4.04	PTV 1SEG	PTV	4:3 240p	2.5 kW	Cebu City	People's Television Network, Inc.	M-F 5:30 AM - 12:00 AM; S-Su 7:00 AM - 12:00 AM	1seg
DYBU	43	647.143 MHz	43.21	DZRH News TV	RHTV	16:9 720p	1.5 kW	Cebu City	Manila Broadcasting Company	M-Su 12:00 AM - 11:59 PM	Commercial Broadcast
DYBU	43	647.143 MHz	43.31	DZRH NEWS 1SEG	RHTV	4:3 240p	1.5 kW	Cebu City	Manila Broadcasting Company	M-Su 12:00 AM - 11:59 PM	1seg
DYCS	47	671.143 MHz	47.01	VERITAS	CCTN	16:9 480i	1 kW	Cebu City	Radio Veritas Global Broadcasting, Inc.	M-Su 4:00 AM - 12:00 AM	Test Broadcast
DYCS	47	671.143 MHz	47.02	TV-FUERZA	TV FUERZA	16:9 480i	1 kW	Cebu City	Radio Veritas Global Broadcasting, Inc.	M-S 4:00 AM - 11:00 PM; Su 4:00 AM - 10:00 PM	Test Broadcast
DYCS	47	671.143 MHz	47.03	TV MARIA	TV Maria	16:9 480i	1 kW	Cebu City	Radio Veritas Global Broadcasting, Inc.	M-Su 6:00 AM - 12:00 AM	Test Broadcast
DYFX	49	683.143 MHz	25.01	NET25	NET25	16:9 1080i	1 kW	Lapu-Lapu City	Eagle Broadcasting Corporation	M-Su 4:00 AM - 12:00 AM	Commercial Broadcast
DYFX	49	683.143 MHz	25.02	INCTV	INCTV	16:9 1080i	1 kW	Lapu-Lapu City	Eagle Broadcasting Corporation	M-Su 4:00 AM - 12:00 AM	Commercial Broadcast

== Eastern Visayas (Region VIII) ==
=== Leyte ===
Callsign	Channel	Frequency	LCN	Name	Programming	Format	Power	Location	Company	Airtime	Notes
DYDS	17	491.143 MHz	17.01	IBC13	IBC	16:9 1080i	5 kW	Palo	Intercontinental Broadcasting Corporation	M-F 5:30 AM - 11:00 PM S-Su 7:00 AM - 10:00 PM	Test Broadcast
DYDS	17	491.143 MHz	17.02	Congress TV	Congress TV	16:9 1080i	5 kW	Palo	Intercontinental Broadcasting Corporation	M-Su 9:00 AM - 9:00 PM	Test Broadcast
PA	28	557.143 MHz	28.01	PRTV PRIME	PRTV Prime Media	4:3 480i	1 kW	Tacloban	Sphere Entertainment, Inc.	M-F 6:00 AM - 12:00 AM; S 6:00 AM - 10:00 AM; Su 6:00 AM - 12:00 AM	Commercial Broadcast
PA	28	557.143 MHz	28.02	KNOWLEDGE CHANNEL	Knowledge Channel	4:3 480i	1 kW	Tacloban	Sphere Entertainment, Inc.	M-Su 6:00 AM - 11:00 PM	Commercial Broadcast
PA	28	557.143 MHz	28.03	RESERVED	(SMPTE Color Bars)	4:3 480i	1 kW	Tacloban	Sphere Entertainment, Inc.	M-Su 6:00 AM - 12:00 AM	Test Broadcast
PA	28	557.143 MHz	28.04	BILYONARYO NEWS CHANNEL	Bilyonaryo News Channel	4:3 480i	1 kW	Tacloban	Sphere Entertainment, Inc.	M-Su 6:00 AM - 12:00 AM	Commercial Broadcast
PA	28	557.143 MHz	28.05	D8TV	D8TV	4:3 480i	1 kW	Tacloban	Sphere Entertainment, Inc.	M-Su 6:00 AM - 12:00 AM	Commercial Broadcast
DYCL	34	593.143 MHz	10.01	GMA	GMA	4:3 480i	10 kW	Tacloban	GMA Network, Inc.	M-S 5:30 AM - 12:30 AM; Su 5:30 AM - 12:00 AM	Commercial Broadcast
DYCL	34	593.143 MHz	10.02	GTV	GTV	4:3 480i	10 kW	Tacloban	GMA Network, Inc.	M-Su 5:30 AM - 12:00 AM	Commercial Broadcast
DYCL	34	593.143 MHz	10.03	HEART OF ASIA	Heart of Asia	4:3 480i	10 kW	Tacloban	GMA Network, Inc.	M-Su 6:00 AM - 12:00 AM	Commercial Broadcast
DYCL	34	593.143 MHz	10.06	I HEART MOVIES	I Heart Movies	4:3 480i	10 kW	Tacloban	GMA Network, Inc.	M-Su 6:00 AM - 12:00 AM	Commercial Broadcast
DYCL	34	593.143 MHz	10.21	GMA 1-Seg	GMA	4:3 240p	10 kW	Tacloban	GMA Network, Inc.	M-S 5:30 AM - 12:30 AM; Su 5:30 AM - 12:00 AM	1seg
DYPR	50	689.143 MHz	27.01	PRTV TACLOBAN	PRTV TACLOBAN	16:9 1080i	2 kW	Tacloban	Philippine Collective Media Corporation	M-Su 6:00 AM - 12:00 AM	Test Broadcast
DYPR	50	689.143 MHz	27.02	TV5	TV5	16:9 480i	2 kW	Tacloban	Philippine Collective Media Corporation	M-F 4:30 AM- 1:00 AM; S 7:00 AM - 1:30 AM; Su 5:30 AM - 1:30 AM	Test Broadcast
DYPR	50	689.143 MHz	27.03	A2Z	A2Z	16:9 720p	2 kW	Tacloban	Philippine Collective Media Corporation	M-F 5:00 AM - 12:15 AM; S 6:00 AM - 11:45 PM; Su 6:00 AM - 11:30 PM	Test Broadcast

=== Samar ===
Callsign	Channel	Frequency	LCN	Name	Programming	Format	Power	Location	Company	Airtime	Notes
PA	17	491.143 MHz	17.01	IBC13	IBC	16:9 1080i	3 kW	Calbayog	Intercontinental Broadcasting Corporation	M-F 5:30 AM - 11:00 PM S-Su 7:00 AM - 10:00 PM	Test Broadcast
PA	17	491.143 MHz	17.02	Congress TV	Congress TV	16:9 1080i	3 kW	Calbayog	Intercontinental Broadcasting Corporation	M-Su 9:00 AM - 9:00 PM	Test Broadcast

== Zamboanga Peninsula (Region IX) ==
=== Zamboanga del Norte ===
Callsign	Channel	Frequency	LCN	Name	Programming	Format	Power	Location	Company	Airtime	Notes
D-4-XT	15	479.143 MHz	4.01	GMA	GMA	4:3 480i	5 kW	Dipolog	GMA Network, Inc.	M-S 5:30 AM - 12:30 AM; Su 5:30 AM - 12:00 AM	Commercial Broadcast
D-4-XT	15	479.143 MHz	4.02	GTV	GTV	4:3 480i	5 kW	Dipolog	GMA Network, Inc.	M-Su 5:30 AM - 12:00 AM	Commercial Broadcast
D-4-XT	15	479.143 MHz	4.03	HEART OF ASIA	Heart of Asia	4:3 480i	5 kW	Dipolog	GMA Network, Inc.	M-Su 6:00 AM - 12:00 AM	Commercial Broadcast
D-4-XT	15	479.143 MHz	4.06	I HEART MOVIES	I Heart Movies	4:3 480i	5 kW	Dipolog	GMA Network, Inc.	M-Su 6:00 AM - 12:00 AM	Commercial Broadcast
D-4-XT	15	479.143 MHz	4.21	GMA 1-Seg	GMA	4:3 240p	5 kW	Dipolog	GMA Network, Inc.	M-S 5:30 AM - 12:30 AM; Su 5:30 AM - 12:00 AM	1seg

=== Zamboanga City ===
Callsign	Channel	Frequency	LCN	Name	Programming	Format	Power	Company	Airtime	Notes
DXMZ	18	497.143 MHz	18.01	TV5	TV5	16:9 480i	10 kW	Cignal TV, Inc. (Mediascape, Inc.)	M-F 4:30 AM - 1:00 AM; S 7:00 AM - 1:30 AM; Su 5:30 AM - 1:30 AM	Commercial Broadcast
DXMZ	18	497.143 MHz	18.02	RPTV	RPTV	16:9 480i	10 kW	Cignal TV, Inc. (Mediascape, Inc.)	M-Su 6:00 AM - 12:00 AM	Commercial Broadcast
DXMZ	18	497.143 MHz	18.03	One Sports	One Sports	16:9 480i	10 kW	Cignal TV, Inc. (Mediascape, Inc.)	M-S 5:00 AM - 12:30 AM; Su 6:00 AM - 12:00 AM	Commercial Broadcast
DXMZ	18	497.143 MHz	18.35	One Seg S1	TV5	16:9 96p	10 kW	Cignal TV, Inc. (Mediascape, Inc.)	M-F 4:30 AM - 1:00 AM; S 7:00 AM - 1:30 AM; Su 5:30 AM - 1:30 AM	1seg
DXBE	31	575.143 MHz	31.01	PRTV PRIME	PRTV Prime Media	4:3 480i	5 kW	Broadcast Enterprises and Affiliated Media, Inc.	M-F 6:00 AM - 12:00 AM; S 6:00 AM - 10:00 AM; Su 6:00 AM - 12:00 AM	Commercial Broadcast
DXBE	31	575.143 MHz	31.02	KNOWLEDGE CHANNEL	Knowledge Channel	4:3 480i	5 kW	Broadcast Enterprises and Affiliated Media, Inc.	M-Su 6:00 AM - 11:00 PM	Commercial Broadcast
DXBE	31	575.143 MHz	31.03	RESERVED	(SMPTE Color Bars)	4:3 480i	5 kW	Broadcast Enterprises and Affiliated Media, Inc.	M-Su 6:00 AM - 12:00 AM	Test Broadcast
DXBE	31	575.143 MHz	31.04	BILYONARYO NEWS CHANNEL	Bilyonaryo News Channel	4:3 480i	5 kW	Broadcast Enterprises and Affiliated Media, Inc.	M-Su 6:00 AM - 12:00 AM	Commercial Broadcast
DXBE	31	575.143 MHz	31.05	D8TV	D8TV	4:3 480i	5 kW	Broadcast Enterprises and Affiliated Media, Inc.	M-Su 6:00 AM - 12:00 AM	Commercial Broadcast
DXAX	40	629.143 MHz	40.04	ALLTV	One PH	4:3 480i	1 kW	Westwind Broadcasting Corporation	M-Su 4:45 AM - 9:30 PM	Test Broadcast
DXAX	40	629.143 MHz	40.11	Emedia Digital TV	eMedia	4:3 480i	1 kW	Westwind Broadcasting Corporation	M-Su 4:45 AM - 9:30 PM	Test Broadcast
DXLA	41	635.143 MHz	9.01	GMA	GMA	4:3 480i	10 kW	GMA Network, Inc.	M-S 5:30 AM - 12:30 AM; Su 5:30 AM - 12:00 AM	Commercial broadcast
DXLA	41	635.143 MHz	9.02	GTV	GTV	4:3 480i	10 kW	GMA Network, Inc.	M-Su 5:30 AM - 12:00 AM	Commercial broadcast
DXLA	41	635.143 MHz	9.03	HEART OF ASIA	Heart of Asia	4:3 480i	10 kW	GMA Network, Inc.	M-Su 6:00 AM - 12:00 AM	Commercial broadcast
DXLA	41	635.143 MHz	9.06	I HEART MOVIES	I Heart Movies	4:3 480i	10 kW	GMA Network, Inc.	M-Su 6:00 AM - 12:00 AM	Commercial broadcast
DXLA	41	635.143 MHz	9.21	GMA 1-Seg	GMA	4:3 240p	10 kW	GMA Network, Inc.	M-S 5:30 AM - 12:30 AM; Su 5:30 AM - 12:00 AM	1seg
DXGB	51	695.143 MHz	51.01	GBPI TV11 HD	GBPI TV11	16:9 720p	5 kW	Golden Broadcasting Professional, Inc.	M-Su 5:00 AM - 11:30 PM	Commercial Broadcast
DXGB	51	695.143 MHz	51.02	GBPI 1Sports	One PH	16:9 480i	5 kW	Golden Broadcasting Professional, Inc.	M-Su 12:01 AM - 12:00 AM	Commercial Broadcast

== Northern Mindanao (Region X) ==
=== Bukidnon ===
Callsign	Channel	Frequency	LCN	Name	Programming	Format	Power	Location	Company	Airtime	Notes
DXMK	44	653.143 MHz	12.01	GMA	GMA	4:3 480i	10 kW	Mt. Kitanglad	GMA Network, Inc.	M-S 5:30 AM - 12:30 AM; Su 5:30 AM - 12:00 AM	Commercial Broadcast
DXMK	44	653.143 MHz	12.02	GTV	GTV	4:3 480i	10 kW	Mt. Kitanglad	GMA Network, Inc.	M-Su 5:30 AM - 12:00 AM	Commercial Broadcast
DXMK	44	653.143 MHz	12.03	HEART OF ASIA	Heart of Asia	4:3 480i	10 kW	Mt. Kitanglad	GMA Network, Inc.	M-Su 6:00 AM - 12:00 AM	Commercial Broadcast
DXMK	44	653.143 MHz	12.06	I HEART MOVIES	I Heart Movies	4:3 480i	10 kW	Mt. Kitanglad	GMA Network, Inc.	M-Su 6:00 AM - 12:00 AM	Commercial Broadcast
DXMK	44	653.143 MHz	12.21	GMA 1-Seg	GMA	4:3 240p	10 kW	Mt. Kitanglad	GMA Network, Inc.	M-S 5:30 AM - 12:30 AM; Su 5:30 AM - 12:00 AM	1seg

=== Lanao del Norte ===
Callsign	Channel	Frequency	LCN	Name	Programming	Format	Power	Location	Company	Airtime	Notes
PA	18	497.143 MHz	5.01	TV5	TV5	16:9 480i	5 kW	Iligan	TV5 Network, Inc.	M-F 4:30 AM - 1:00 AM; S 7:00 AM - 1:30 AM; Su 5:30 AM - 1:30 AM	Commercial Broadcast
PA	18	497.143 MHz	5.02	RPTV	RPTV	16:9 480i	5 kW	Iligan	TV5 Network, Inc.	M-Su 6:00 AM - 12:00 AM	Commercial Broadcast
PA	18	497.143 MHz	5.03	One Sports	One Sports	16:9 480i	5 kW	Iligan	TV5 Network, Inc.	M-S 5:00 AM - 12:30 AM; Su 6:00 AM - 1:00 AM	Commercial Broadcast
PA	18	497.143 MHz	5.35	One Seg S1	TV5	16:9 96p	5 kW	Iligan	TV5 Network, Inc.	M-F 4:30 AM - 1:00 AM; S 7:00 AM - 1:30 AM; Su 5:30 AM - 1:30 AM	1seg
DXRV	33	587.143 MHz	11.01	GMA	GMA	4:3 480i	5 kW	Iligan	GMA Network, Inc.	M-S 5:30 AM - 12:30 AM; Su 5:30 AM - 12:00 AM	Commercial Broadcast
DXRV	33	587.143 MHz	11.02	GTV	GTV	4:3 480i	5 kW	Iligan	GMA Network, Inc.	M-Su 5:30 AM - 12:00 AM	Commercial Broadcast
DXRV	33	587.143 MHz	11.03	HEART OF ASIA	Heart of Asia	4:3 480i	5 kW	Iligan	GMA Network, Inc.	M-Su 6:00 AM - 12:00 AM	Commercial Broadcast
DXRV	33	587.143 MHz	11.06	I HEART MOVIES	I Heart Movies	4:3 480i	5 kW	Iligan	GMA Network, Inc.	M-Su 6:00 AM - 12:00 AM	Commercial Broadcast
DXRV	33	587.143 MHz	11.21	GMA 1-Seg	GMA	4:3 240p	5 kW	Iligan	GMA Network, Inc.	M-S 5:30 AM - 12:30 AM; Su 5:30 AM - 12:00 AM	1seg

=== Misamis Oriental ===
Callsign	Channel	Frequency	LCN	Name	Programming	Format	Power	Location	Company	Airtime	Notes
DXAL	16	485.143 MHz	2.01	ALLTV HD	ALLTV2	16:9 1080i	10 kW	Cagayan de Oro	Advanced Media Broadcasting System, Inc.	M-F 5:30 AM - 11:15 PM; S 5:30 AM - 12:00 AM; Su 6:00 AM - 12:45 AM	Commercial Broadcast
DXCC	17	491.143 MHz	17.01	IBC13	IBC	16:9 1080i	5 kW	Cagayan de Oro	Intercontinental Broadcasting Corporation	M-F 5:30 AM - 11:00 PM S-Su 7:00 AM - 10:00 PM	Commercial Broadcast
DXCC	17	491.143 MHz	17.02	Congress TV	Congress TV	16:9 1080i	5 kW	Cagayan de Oro	Intercontinental Broadcasting Corporation	M-Su 9:00 AM - 9:00 PM	Commercial Broadcast
DXTE	18	497.143 MHz	5.01	TV5	TV5	16:9 480i	10 kW	Cagayan de Oro	TV5 Network, Inc.	M-F 4:30 AM - 1:00 AM; S 7:00 AM - 1:30 AM; Su 5:30 AM - 1:30 AM	Commercial Broadcast
DXTE	18	497.143 MHz	5.02	RPTV	RPTV	16:9 480i	10 kW	Cagayan de Oro	TV5 Network, Inc.	M-Su 6:00 AM - 12:00 AM	Commercial Broadcast
DXTE	18	497.143 MHz	5.03	One Sports	One Sports	16:9 480i	10 kW	Cagayan de Oro	TV5 Network, Inc.	M-S 5:00 AM - 12:30 AM; Su 6:00 AM - 1:00 AM	Commercial Broadcast
DXTE	18	497.143 MHz	5.35	One Seg S1	TV5	16:9 96p	10 kW	Cagayan de Oro	TV5 Network, Inc.	M-F 4:30 AM - 1:00 AM; S 7:00 AM - 1:30 AM; Su 5:30 AM - 1:30 AM	1seg
DXEV	20	509.143 MHz	20.01	A2Z	A2Z	4:3 480i	5.5 kW	Cagayan de Oro	Zoe Broadcasting Network, Inc.	M-F 5:00 AM - 12:15 AM; S 6:00 AM - 11:00 PM; Su 6:00 AM - 11:45 PM	Commercial Broadcast
DXEV	20	509.143 MHz	20.02	Light TV	Light TV	4:3 480i	5.5 kW	Cagayan de Oro	Zoe Broadcasting Network, Inc.	M-Su 6:00 AM - 12:00 AM	Commercial Broadcast
DXEV	20	509.143 MHz	20.31	A2Z Oneseg	—N/a	—N/a	5.5 kW	Cagayan de Oro	Zoe Broadcasting Network, Inc.	M-F 5:00 AM - 12:15 AM; S 6:00 AM - 11:00 PM; Su 6:00 AM - 11:45 PM	1seg
DXBA	43	647.143 MHz	43.01	PRTV PRIME	PRTV Prime Media	4:3 480i	2.4 kW	Cagayan de Oro	Broadcast Enterprises and Affiliated Media, Inc.	M-F 6:00 AM - 11:30 PM; S 6:00 AM - 10:00 PM; Su 6:00 AM - 10:30 PM	Commercial Broadcast
DXBA	43	647.143 MHz	43.02	KNOWLEDGE CHANNEL	Knowledge Channel	4:3 480i	2.4 kW	Cagayan de Oro	Broadcast Enterprises and Affiliated Media, Inc.	M-Su 6:00 AM - 11:00 PM	Commercial Broadcast
DXBA	43	647.143 MHz	43.03	RESERVED	(SMPTE Color Bars)	4:3 480i	2.4 kW	Cagayan de Oro	Broadcast Enterprises and Affiliated Media, Inc.	M-Su 6:00 AM - 12:00 AM	Commercial Broadcast
DXBA	43	647.143 MHz	43.04	BILYONARYO NEWS CHANNEL	Bilyonaryo News Channel	4:3 480i	2.4 kW	Cagayan de Oro	Broadcast Enterprises and Affiliated Media, Inc.	M-Su 6:00 AM - 12:00 AM	Commercial Broadcast
DXBA	43	647.143 MHz	43.05	D8TV	D8TV	4:3 480i	2.4 kW	Cagayan de Oro	Broadcast Enterprises and Affiliated Media, Inc.	M-Su 6:00 AM - 12:00 AM	Commercial Broadcast
DXDZ	47	671.143 MHz	12.01	GMA	GMA	4:3 480i	10 kW	Cagayan de Oro	GMA Network, Inc.	M-S 5:30 AM - 12:30 AM; Su 5:30 AM - 12:00 AM	Commercial Broadcast
DXDZ	47	671.143 MHz	12.02	GTV	GTV	4:3 480i	10 kW	Cagayan de Oro	GMA Network, Inc.	M-Su 5:30 AM - 12:00 AM	Commercial Broadcast
DXDZ	47	671.143 MHz	12.03	HEART OF ASIA	Heart of Asia	4:3 480i	10 kW	Cagayan de Oro	GMA Network, Inc.	M-Su 6:00 AM - 12:00 AM	Commercial Broadcast
DXDZ	47	671.143 MHz	12.06	I HEART MOVIES	I Heart Movies	4:3 480i	10 kW	Cagayan de Oro	GMA Network, Inc.	M-Su 6:00 AM - 12:00 AM	Commercial Broadcast
DXDZ	47	671.143 MHz	12.21	GMA 1-Seg	GMA	4:3 240p	10 kW	Cagayan de Oro	GMA Network, Inc.	M-S 5:30 AM - 12:30 AM; Su 5:30 AM - 12:00 AM	1seg
PA	51	695.143 MHz	51.21	JAO TV	Jao TV	16:9 480i	0.2 kW	Cagayan de Oro	Westwind Broadcasting Corporation	Su 7:30 AM - 8:30 AM	Commercial Broadcast
PA	51	695.143 MHz	51.22	NOA TV	(SMPTE Color Bars)	16:9 480i	0.2 kW	Cagayan de Oro	Westwind Broadcasting Corporation	Su 7:30 AM - 8:30 AM	Commercial Broadcast
PA	51	695.143 MHz	51.23	DTV3 CH51	(SMPTE Color Bars)	16:9 480i	0.2 kW	Cagayan de Oro	Westwind Broadcasting Corporation	Su 7:30 AM - 8:30 AM	Commercial Broadcast
PA	51	695.143 MHz	51.24	DTV4 CH51	Klarex TV	16:9 480i	0.2 kW	Cagayan de Oro	Westwind Broadcasting Corporation	Su 7:30 AM - 8:30 AM	Commercial Broadcast

== Davao Region (Region XI) ==
=== Davao City ===
Callsign	Channel	Frequency	LCN	Name	Programming	Format	Power	Company	Airtime	Notes
DXAK	16	485.143 MHz	2.01	ALLTV HD	ALLTV2	16:9 1080i	10 kW	Advanced Media Broadcasting System, Inc.	M-F 5:30 AM - 11:15 PM; S 5:30 AM - 12:00 AM; Su 6:00 AM - 12:45 AM	Commercial Broadcast
DXTV	17	491.143 MHz	17.01	IBC13	IBC	16:9 1080i	5 kW	Intercontinental Broadcasting Corporation	M-F 5:30 AM - 11:00 PM; S-Su 7:00 AM - 10:00 PM	Commercial Broadcast
DXTV	17	491.143 MHz	17.02	Congress TV	Congress TV	16:9 1080i	5 kW	Intercontinental Broadcasting Corporation	M-Su 9:00 AM - 9:00 PM	Commercial Broadcast
DXET	18	497.143 MHz	5.01	TV5	TV5	16:9 480i	10 kW	TV5 Network, Inc.	M-F 4:30 AM - 1:00 AM; S 7:00 AM - 1:30 AM; Su 5:30 AM - 1:30 AM	Commercial Broadcast
DXET	18	497.143 MHz	5.02	RPTV	RPTV	16:9 480i	10 kW	TV5 Network, Inc.	M-Su 6:00 AM - 12:00 AM	Commercial Broadcast
DXET	18	497.143 MHz	5.03	One Sports	One Sports	16:9 480i	10 kW	TV5 Network, Inc.	M-S 5:00 AM - 12:30 AM; Su 6:00 AM - 12:00 AM	Commercial Broadcast
DXET	18	497.143 MHz	5.35	One Seg S1	TV5	16:9 96p	10 kW	TV5 Network, Inc.	M-F 4:30 AM - 1:00 AM; S 7:00 AM - 1:30 AM; Su 5:30 AM - 1:30 AM	1seg
DXEX	20	509.143 MHz	20.01	A2Z	A2Z	4:3 480i	5.5 kW	Zoe Broadcasting Network, Inc.	M-F 5:00 AM - 12:15 AM; S 6:00 AM - 11:00 PM; Su 6:00 AM - 11:45 PM	Commercial Broadcast
DXEX	20	509.143 MHz	20.02	Light TV	Light TV	4:3 480i	5.5 kW	Zoe Broadcasting Network, Inc.	M-Su 6:00 AM - 12:00 AM	Commercial Broadcast
DXEX	20	509.143 MHz	20.31	A2Z Oneseg	—N/a	—N/a	5.5 kW	Zoe Broadcasting Network, Inc.	M-F 5:00 AM - 12:15 AM; S 6:00 AM - 11:00 PM; Su 6:00 AM - 11:45 PM	1seg
DXKC	31	575.143 MHz	26.01	PRTV PRIME	PRTV Prime Media	16:9 480i	5 kW	Broadcast Enterprises and Affiliated Media, Inc.	M-F 6:00 AM - 12:00 AM; S 6:00 AM - 10:00 AM; Su 6:00 AM - 12:00 AM	Commercial Broadcast
DXKC	31	575.143 MHz	26.02	KNOWLEDGE CHANNEL	Knowledge Channel	16:9 480i	5 kW	Broadcast Enterprises and Affiliated Media, Inc.	M-Su 6:00 AM - 11:00 PM	Commercial Broadcast
DXKC	31	575.143 MHz	26.03	RESERVED	(SMPTE Color Bars)	16:9 480i	5 kW	Broadcast Enterprises and Affiliated Media, Inc.	M-Su 6:00 AM - 12:00 AM	Test Broadcast
DXKC	31	575.143 MHz	26.04	BILYONARYO NEWS CHANNEL	Bilyonaryo News Channel	16:9 480i	5 kW	Broadcast Enterprises and Affiliated Media, Inc.	M-Su 6:00 AM - 12:00 AM	Commercial Broadcast
DXKC	31	575.143 MHz	26.05	D8TV	D8TV	16:9 480i	5 kW	Broadcast Enterprises and Affiliated Media, Inc.	M-Su 6:00 AM - 12:00 AM	Commercial Broadcast
DXMJ	37	611.143 MHz	5.01	GMA	GMA	4:3 480i	15 kW	GMA Network, Inc.	M-F 5:30 AM - 12:30 AM; S-Su 5:30 AM - 12:00 AM	Commercial Broadcast
DXMJ	37	611.143 MHz	5.02	GTV	GTV	4:3 480i	15 kW	GMA Network, Inc.	M-S 5:30 AM - 12:00 AM; Su 6:00 AM - 12:00 AM	Commercial Broadcast
DXMJ	37	611.143 MHz	5.03	HEART OF ASIA	Heart of Asia	4:3 480i	15 kW	GMA Network, Inc.	M-Su 6:00 AM - 12:00 AM	Commercial Broadcast
DXMJ	37	611.143 MHz	5.06	I HEART MOVIES	I Heart Movies	4:3 480i	15 kW	GMA Network, Inc.	M-Su 6:00 AM - 12:00 AM	Commercial Broadcast
DXMJ	37	611.143 MHz	5.21	GMA 1-Seg	GMA	4:3 240p	15 kW	GMA Network, Inc.	M-F 5:30 AM - 12:30 AM; S-Su 5:30 AM - 12:00 AM	1seg
DXNP	45	659.143 MHz	11.01	PTV HD1	PTV	16:9 1080i	5 kW	People's Television Network, Inc.	M-F 5:30 AM - 12:00 AM; S-Su 7:00 AM - 12:00 AM	Commercial Broadcast
DXNP	45	659.143 MHz	11.02	PTV SD2	PTV	16:9 480i	5 kW	People's Television Network, Inc.	M-F 5:30 AM - 12:00 AM; S-Su 7:00 AM - 12:00 AM	Commercial Broadcast
DXNP	45	659.143 MHz	11.03	PTV SD3	PTV Sports	16:9 480i	5 kW	People's Television Network, Inc.	M-F 5:30 AM - 12:00 AM; S-Su 7:00 AM - 12:00 AM	Commercial Broadcast
DXNP	45	659.143 MHz	11.04	PTV 1seg	—N/a	—N/a	5 kW	People's Television Network, Inc.	M-F 5:30 AM - 12:00 AM; S-Su 7:00 AM - 12:00 AM	1seg
DXED	49	683.143 MHz	25.01	NET25	NET25	16:9 1080i	1 kW	Eagle Broadcasting Corporation	M-Su 4:00 AM - 12:00 AM	Commercial Broadcast
DXED	49	683.143 MHz	25.02	INCTV	INCTV	16:9 1080i	1 kW	Eagle Broadcasting Corporation	M-Su 4:00 AM - 12:00 AM	Commercial Broadcast

== SOCCSKSARGEN (Region XII) ==
=== South Cotabato ===
Callsign	Channel	Frequency	LCN	Name	Programming	Format	Power	Location	Company	Airtime	Notes
DXER	18	497.143 MHz	5.01	TV5	TV5	16:9 480i	10 kW	General Santos	TV5 Network, Inc.	M-F 4:30 AM - 1:00 AM; S 7:00 AM - 1:30 AM; Su 5:30 AM - 1:30 AM	Commercial Broadcast
DXER	18	497.143 MHz	5.02	RPTV	RPTV	16:9 480i	10 kW	General Santos	TV5 Network, Inc.	M-Su 6:00 AM - 12:00 AM	Commercial Broadcast
DXER	18	497.143 MHz	5.03	One Sports	One Sports	16:9 480i	10 kW	General Santos	TV5 Network, Inc.	M-S 5:00 AM - 12:30 AM; Su 6:00 AM - 12:00 AM	Commercial Broadcast
DXER	18	497.143 MHz	5.35	One Seg S1	TV5	16:9 96p	10 kW	General Santos	TV5 Network, Inc.	M-F 4:30 AM - 1:00 AM; S 7:00 AM - 1:30 AM; Su 5:30 AM - 1:30 AM	1seg
DXBG	34	593.143 MHz	8.01	GMA	GMA	4:3 480i	10 kW	General Santos	GMA Network, Inc.	M-F 5:30 AM - 12:30 AM; S-Su 5:30 AM - 12:00 AM	Commercial Broadcast
DXBG	34	593.143 MHz	8.02	GTV	GTV	4:3 480i	10 kW	General Santos	GMA Network, Inc.	M-S 5:30 AM - 12:00 AM; Su 6:00 AM - 12:00 AM	Commercial Broadcast
DXBG	34	593.143 MHz	8.03	HEART OF ASIA	Heart of Asia	4:3 480i	10 kW	General Santos	GMA Network, Inc.	M-Su 6:00 AM - 12:00 AM	Commercial Broadcast
DXBG	34	593.143 MHz	8.06	I HEART MOVIES	I Heart Movies	4:3 480i	10 kW	General Santos	GMA Network, Inc.	M-Su 6:00 AM - 12:00 AM	Commercial Broadcast
DXBG	34	593.143 MHz	8.21	GMA 1-Seg	GMA	4:3 240p	10 kW	General Santos	GMA Network, Inc.	M-F 5:30 AM - 12:30 AM; S-Su 5:30 AM - 12:00 AM	1seg
DXBC	37	611.143 MHz	37.01	BRIGADA TV-HD	Brigada TV	16:9 1080i	0.5 kW	General Santos	Baycomms Broadcasting Corporation	M-Su 4:30 AM - 11:30 PM	Commercial Broadcast
DXBC	37	611.143 MHz	37.02	BRIGADA TV-SD	Brigada News FM General Santos	16:9 480i	0.5 kW	General Santos	Baycomms Broadcasting Corporation	M-Su 4:30 AM - 11:30 PM	Commercial Broadcast
DXAH	51	695.143 MHz	51.01	PRTV PRIME	PRTV Prime Media	4:3 480i	1 kW	General Santos	Sphere Entertainment, Inc.	M-F 6:00 AM - 12:00 AM; S 6:00 AM - 10:00 AM; Su 6:00 AM - 12:00 AM	Commercial Broadcast
DXAH	51	695.143 MHz	51.02	KNOWLEDGE CHANNEL	Knowledge Channel	4:3 480i	1 kW	General Santos	Sphere Entertainment, Inc.	M-Su 6:00 AM - 11:00 PM	Commercial Broadcast
DXAH	51	695.143 MHz	51.03	RESERVED	(SMPTE Color Bars)	4:3 480i	1 kW	General Santos	Sphere Entertainment, Inc.	M-Su 6:00 AM - 12:00 AM	Test Broadcast
DXAH	51	695.143 MHz	51.04	BILYONARYO NEWS CHANNEL	Bilyonaryo News Channel	4:3 480i	1 kW	General Santos	Sphere Entertainment, Inc.	M-Su 6:00 AM - 12:00 AM	Commercial Broadcast
DXAH	51	695.143 MHz	51.05	D8TV	D8TV	4:3 480i	1 kW	General Santos	Sphere Entertainment, Inc.	M-Su 6:00 AM - 12:00 AM	Commercial Broadcast

== Caraga (Region XIII) ==
=== Agusan del Norte ===
Callsign	Channel	Frequency	LCN	Name	Programming	Format	Power	Location	Company	Airtime	Notes
DXBM	15	479.143 MHz	26.01	GMA	GMA	4:3 480i	10 kW	Butuan	GMA Network, Inc.	M-F 5:30 AM - 12:30 AM; S-Su 5:30 AM - 12:00 AM	Commercial Broadcast
DXBM	15	479.143 MHz	26.02	GTV	GTV	4:3 480i	10 kW	Butuan	GMA Network, Inc.	M-S 5:30 AM - 12:00 AM; Su 6:00 AM - 12:00 AM	Commercial Broadcast
DXBM	15	479.143 MHz	26.03	HEART OF ASIA	Heart of Asia	4:3 480i	10 kW	Butuan	GMA Network, Inc.	M-Su 6:00 AM - 12:00 AM	Commercial Broadcast
DXBM	15	479.143 MHz	26.06	I HEART MOVIES	I Heart Movies	4:3 480i	10 kW	Butuan	GMA Network, Inc.	M-Su 6:00 AM - 12:00 AM	Commercial Broadcast
DXBM	15	479.143 MHz	26.21	GMA 1-Seg	GMA	4:3 240p	10 kW	Butuan	GMA Network, Inc.	M-F 5:30 AM - 12:30 AM; S-Su 5:30 AM - 12:00 AM	1seg
PA	18	497.143 MHz	5.01	TV5	TV5	16:9 480i	5 kW	Butuan	TV5 Network, Inc.	M-F 4:30 AM - 1:00 AM; S 7:00 AM - 1:30 AM; Su 5:30 AM - 1:30 AM	Commercial Broadcast
PA	18	497.143 MHz	5.02	RPTV	RPTV	16:9 480i	5 kW	Butuan	TV5 Network, Inc.	M-Su 6:00 AM - 12:00 AM	Commercial Broadcast
PA	18	497.143 MHz	5.03	One Sports	One Sports	16:9 480i	5 kW	Butuan	TV5 Network, Inc.	M-S 5:00 AM - 12:30 AM; Su 6:00 AM - 12:00 AM	Commercial Broadcast
PA	18	497.143 MHz	5.35	One Seg S1	TV5	16:9 96p	5 kW	Butuan	TV5 Network, Inc.	M-F 4:30 AM - 1:00 AM; S 7:00 AM - 1:30 AM; Su 5:30 AM - 1:30 AM	1seg

== Bangsamoro Autonomous Region in Muslim Mindanao (BARMM) ==
There are no digital TV stations yet.
