= DXGS =

DXGS may refer to:

- DXGS-AM, an AM radio station broadcasting in General Santos, branded as Radyo Pilipino
- DXGS-FM, an FM radio station broadcasting in Marawi, branded as Radyo Dansalan
