= DWFU-DTV =

- San Fernando, Pampanga; Philippines
- Channels: Digital: 44 (UHF) (ISDB-T test broadcast)
- Branding: GNN TV44 Pampanga

Programming
- Affiliations: One Media Network

Ownership
- Owner: Infomax Media; (Global Satellite Technology Services)

History
- First air date: 2005
- Former call signs: DWFU-TV (2011-2021)
- Former channel numbers: Analog: 44 (UHF, 2011–2021)
- Former affiliations: Global News Network (2011–2019); One Media Network (2019–2021); Golden Nation Network (2021-2023)
- Call sign meaning: First United Broadcasting Corporation (former branding)

Technical information
- Licensing authority: NTC
- Power: 1,000 watts TPO
- ERP: 3,000 watts ERP

Links
- Website: http://www.facebook.com/GNNTV44Pampanga

DWFU-DTV is a regional free-to-air television station located in Pampanga, Philippines. Its studios and transmitter are located at Mac Arthur Highway, Barangay Del Rosario, San Fernando, Pampanga. It was formerly on cable channel 8 but later transferred to free TV via Channel 44 with the power of 1000 watts. It is currently an affiliate of Golden Nation Network (thus it became GNN-Infomax TV). It also served as a community channel for Kapampangans.

Following the closure of GNN on January 31, 2019, this station retained the GNN brand and its own local programming. On June 6, 2019, GNN44 was officially rebranded as One Media TV44 before reverting to GNN.

== GNN TV-44 Pampanga Programs ==
- NewsForce Pampanga
- Morning Balitaktakan Pampanga
- Oras Na Pampanga
- GNN Konek
- Inside Pampanga
- Kabuhayang Pilipino Pampanga
- Pulisya at Barangay

== Digital television ==
=== Digital channels ===
DWFU-DTV's digital signal operates on UHF channel 44 (653.143 MHz) and broadcasts on the following subchannels:

| Channel | Video | Aspect | Short name | Programming | Note |
|---|---|---|---|---|---|
| 44.01 | 480i | 4:3 | GNN | GNN Pampanga | Fully migrated from analog to digital/Test Broadcast/Configuration Testing |
| 44.02 | 480i | 4:3 | GNN Central Luzon | Black Screen | Fully migrated from analog to digital/Test Broadcast/Configuration Testing |
| 44.03 | 480i | 4:3 | Hope Phil | Black Screen | Fully migrated from analog to digital/Test Broadcast/Configuration Testing |
