= Jao TV =

- Cagayan de Oro; Philippines
- Channels: Digital: 51; Virtual: 51.21
- Branding: JaoTV Cagayan de Oro

Programming
- Affiliations: 51.21: JAO TV; 51.22: NOA TV; 51.23: DTV3 CH51; 51.24: DTV4 CH51

Ownership
- Owner: Westwind Broadcasting Corporation
- Operator: Cagayan de Oro Eagle's Eye Broadcasting Corp.

History
- First air date: 2018
- Former channel numbers: Analog: 37; Digital: 32

Technical information
- Licensing authority: NTC
- Power: 200 watts

Jao TV (DTV-51 digital) is a television station of Westwind Broadcasting Corporation operated by Cagayan de Oro Eagle's Eye Broadcasting Corp.. Its studio and transmitter are located in Sitio Bontula, Brgy. Macasandig, Cagayan de Oro. This station currently operates on a low powered signal (200 watts).

== Digital Television ==
=== Digital Channels ===
UHF Channel 51 (695.143 MHz)

LCN	Video	Aspect	Name	Programming	Notes
51.21	480i	16:9	JAO TV	Jao TV	Commercial Broadcast
51.22	480i	16:9	NOA TV	(SMPTE Color Bars)	Commercial Broadcast
51.23	480i	16:9	DTV3 CH51	(SMPTE Color Bars)	Commercial Broadcast
51.24	480i	16:9	DTV4 CH51	Klarex TV	Commercial Broadcast

== Cable Televisions ==
Provider	Channel	Coverage
Parasat Cable TV	29	Regional
Jade Cable TV	27 or 28	Cagayan de Oro
DEARBC Cable TV	19 (Analog)	Bukidnon
DEARBC Cable TV	2 (Digital)	Bukidnon

== Coverage Areas ==
=== Primary Areas ===
- Cagayan de Oro
- Portion of Misamis Oriental

==== Secondary Areas ====
- Northern portion of Bukidnon
