= G Sat =

Satellite television service in the Philippines

G-Sat
- Type: Direct-broadcast satellite television
- Country: Philippines
- Founded: 2006; 20 years ago
- Owner: Global Satellite Technology Services (First Global Conglomerates)
- Picture format: DVB-S2 MPEG-4
- Official website: gsattv.asia

G-Sat (Global Satellite) is a subscription-based direct-to-home (DTH) satellite television service commercially available in the Philippines. G-Sat is owned by Global Satellite Technology Services (GSTS), registered in the Philippines with the Securities and Exchange Commission (SEC). G-Sat also carried pay TV channels from Hong Kong (through its feed of some channels), Macau and Taiwan, which TV shows and movies subtitled in Cantonese and Mandarin.

It is operated and managed by international and professional management groups engaged in the business of: satellite wireless transmission, WIMAX transmission, landline transmission, satellite internet data transmission, satellite direct-to-home TV operation, terrestrial television operation, broadband data service, head end in the sky operation, content aggregation, production and distribution, consolidation of telecom and broadcasting management.

In August 2016, G-Sat was moved to SES-9 from their former satellite broadcaster NSS 11 due on its system upgrade.

== Technical information ==
Satellite	Band	Position	Frequency	Polarity	SR	FEC	Encryption	System	Status	Coverage
SES-9	Ku Band	108.2° East	12341, 12401 and 12461 MHz	Horizontal (H)	45000	5/6	Conax	DVB-S2 MPEG-4	Commercial broadcast	Philippines
SES-9	Ku Band	108.2° East	12711 MHz	Horizontal (H)	45000	5/6	Conax	DVB-S2 MPEG-4	Commercial broadcast	Philippines

G Sat broadcasts in DVB-S (for standard definition channels and audio channels) and DVB-S2 (for HD channels) on SES-9 satellite at 108.2°E. Originally, prior to its system upgrade in August 2016, a loophole has been discovered that half of G Sat's channels were free-to-air, which can be received using an existing free-to-air satellite receiver, this allowed viewers to watch some half of the channels without any existing subscription (in a way to United Kingdom's Freesat service). However, as of August 2016, due to its system upgrade and migration to SES-9, all of the channels are now encrypted (except Golden Nation Network and BBC World Service), which now requires subscription.

In January 2017, G Sat announced to their subscribers to rescan their subscriber's receivers for the channel line-up's change.

Frame rates in some NTSC-relying TV channels, including GMA, Kapamilya Channel, A2Z, TAP Movies, and others have been dropped from 30/60 FPS to 25/50 FPS (which 25/50 frames per second is based on PAL).

== Status of competition and controversy ==
Dream Satellite TV filed a complaint with the National Telecommunications Commission (NTC) against Global Broadcasting and Multimedia, Inc. (G Sat) for offering A DTH service in the Philippines without a franchise and a license from Philippine authorities, namely the Philippine Congress for a broadcast franchise and the NTC for a Certificate of Public Convenience. Aside from Dream, the Lopez group, SkyCable, a sister company of ABS-CBN, also filed a similar complaint against GBMI. It argued that GBMI's illegal entry into the industry will result in the unnecessary duplication of an existing service that existing cable TV and DTH-TV service providers already adequately provide.

On July 30, 2020, President Rodrigo Duterte signed Republic Act No. 11481, which extended the franchise of First United Broadcasting Corporation to 25 years.

== In-house channels ==
=== Current ===
Currently, G Sat owns its in-house channels:

- Golden Nation Network - news, current affairs and lifestyle channel
- Golf Channel Philippines - Dedicated golf channel, in partnership with Comcast/NBCUniversal International Networks
- Music Quest - Karaoke channel

=== Former channels ===
- GKTV 3/PCTV 3
- Global News Network
- Global Pinoy Cinema - Filipino movie channel
- Global Theater - Mandarin movie channel
- One Media Network
- Golden Nation Network
- GCLTHP Movies Channel (GMC)

== See also ==
- Cignal (rival)
- DirecTV (United States)
- Dish Network (United States)
