= DWFA-DTV =

DWFA-DTV (GNN TV 48 Naga)
- Naga City; Philippines
- Channels: Digital: 48 (UHF) (ISDB-T) (Test Broadcast)
- Branding: GNN TV48

Programming
- Affiliations: 48.01: Tiger48 TV; 48.02: GNN Manila; 48.03: Tiger FM; 48.04: Island Living

Ownership
- Owner: Global Satellite Technology Services

History
- Founded: 2009
- Former channel numbers: Analog: 48 (UHF, 2009–2021)
- Former affiliations: Global News Network (2009–2019); One Media Network (2019–2021); Golden Nation Network (2021–2023)
- Call sign meaning: DW; First United BroadcAsting Corporation (former branding)

Technical information
- Licensing authority: NTC
- Power: 1 kilowatts
- ERP: 5 kilowatts

Links
- Website: GNN TV48 Naga on Facebook

DWFA-DTV, better known on-air as GNN TV 48 Naga, is a TV station owned by Global Satellite Technology Services and currently an affiliate of the Golden Nation Network in the Philippines. Its studios and transmitter are located at the 5th Floor, S.T. Bldg., Naga College Foundation Compound, Brgy. Peñafrancia, Naga City. It covers the whole Naga City and nearby towns.

== Programs ==
- GNN NewsBreak
- Talk of the Town

== Digital television ==
=== Digital channels ===
UHF Channel 48 (677.143 MHz)

Channel	Video	Aspect	Short name	Programming	Notes
48.01	1080i	16:9	Tiger TV48	Tiger TV48	Fully migrated from analog to digital/Test Broadcast
48.02	1080i	16:9	GNN Manila	GNN Local Programs	Fully migrated from analog to digital/Test Broadcast

== See also ==
- Global News Network
- One Media Network
- DWVN-DTV
- Gateway UHF Television
- Global Satellite Technology Services
- DepEd TV
- UHF Broadcasting
- Seventh-day Adventist Church
- List of TV Stations operated by Gateway UHF Television
- List of TV Stations operated by Global Satellite Technology Services
