= Global Satellite Technology Services =

Philippine media company

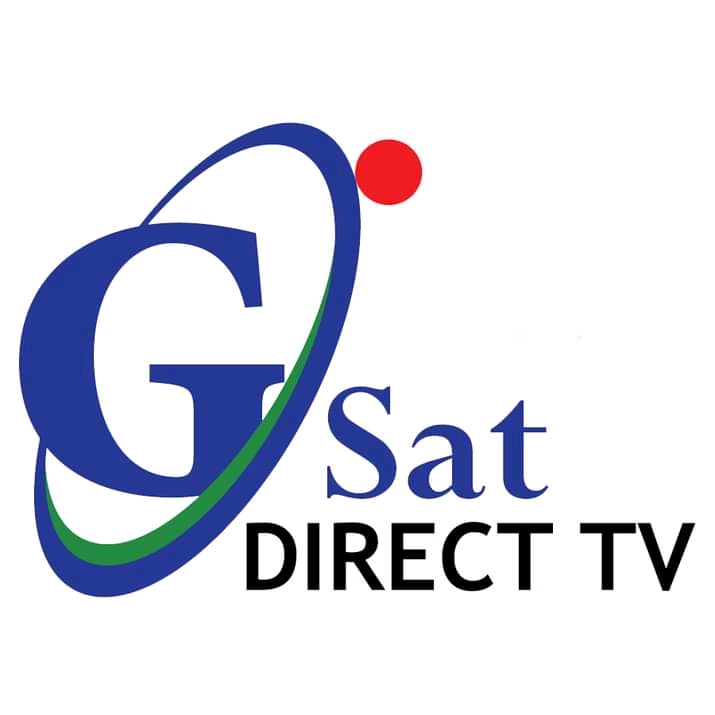
- Type: Private
- Industry: Mass media Telecommunications
- Predecessor: First United Broadcasting Corporation (1977-2002)
- Founded: 1977
- Founder: Ma. Clara "Caling" L. Lobregat; Basilio "Bong" Apolinario II
- Headquarters: First Global Building, 122 Gamboa corner Adelantado streets, Legazpi Village, Makati, Metro Manila, Philippines; GSTS Building, First Global Technopark, Lot 1910 Governor's Drive, Mabuhay, Carmona, Cavite, Philippines
- Key people: Philip J. Chien (Chairman of the Board); Allan P. Dungao (President and CEO)
- Brands: G Sat; Golden Nation Network
- Services: Television broadcasting, direct broadcast satellite
- Owner: First Global Conglomerates
- Website: www.fgci.ph

Global Satellite Technology Services (formerly known as First United Broadcasting Corporation) is a broadcast media and telecommunications company in the Philippines. Its original station FUBC TV-9 in Zamboanga was an affiliate of BBC from 1974 to 1986, ABS-CBN in 1986–1995 and GMA Network from 1995 until April 1996.

Currently, GSTS owns a satellite television service G Sat and a free-to-air/cable news channel Golden Nation Network, which is also available in the company's UHF stations.

== History ==
=== Early years ===
First United Broadcasting Corporation was founded by Ma. Clara "Caling" L. Lobregat, Zamboanga City's first ever female city mayor, and Basilio "Bong" Apolinario II. It brought to Zamboanga City its first FM station and its first color television station in 1977. The television station, DXLA 9Alive, was characterized by 9 "lovely" ladies, and it was affiliated by the Banahaw Broadcasting Corporation. This network has produced several media personalities such as Cathy Veloso Santillan (one of the original 9Alive Girls who became a broadcaster and NewsWatch anchor of RPN-9 in the early 1990s), Zamboanga City District II Congressman Erico Basilio "Erbie" Fabian and ABS-CBN Correspondent for Western Mindanao and former anchor Pal Marquez, all of whom began their careers as part of the channel's news division.

=== Later years ===
In 1995, its original TV station, VHF channel 9 in Zamboanga City was sold to GMA. Its FM station, DXLA-FM 99.5 MHz, and AM station, DXRH-AM 1080 kHz went off the air.

In 2003, a group of broadcast investors led by Global Destiny Cable (now Destiny Cable) then-executive Philip J. Chien acquired the franchise, ownership and management of FUBC. FUBC has reinvented its image and now operates one of the Philippines' Direct-To-Home (DTH) Satellite Networks called G Sat and one of the Philippines' all news channel in cable and now in terrestrial networks called Global News Network, which is currently known as Golden Nation Network.

In 2014, it partnered with Newtec to launch a broadband service called iGSat Satellite Broadband.

In 2018, FUBC merged with Global Broadcasting and Multimedia Inc. into a single entity and changed its name to Global Satellite Technology Services Inc.

On July 30, 2020, Philippine President Rodrigo Duterte signed Republic Act No. 11481 which renewed GSTS's license for another 25 years. The law granted GSTS a franchise to construct, install, operate, and maintain, for commercial purposes, radio broadcasting stations and television stations, including digital television system, with the corresponding facilities such as relay stations, throughout the Philippines.

On June 23, 2021, GSTS inaugurated its own Technical facilities and Earth station at the new First Global Technopark complex in Mabuhay, Carmona, Cavite.

In August 2023, Y2H Broadcasting Network Inc., a subsidiary of Yes2Health Inc. took over broadcast operations of GSTS-owned DXLA 99.5 FM in Zamboanga and began its test broadcast as 99.5 XFM Zamboanga. on November 12 of the same year, XFM Zamboanga was officially launched with a motorcade and the station held a grand opening of its studios and offices along Marquez Drive corner Estrada Street, Zamboanga City. On June 29, 2024, a large explosion occurred in Marquez Drive, where XFM studios are based. Reports indicate that there are 5 people dead, and 21 more injured in the forementioned incident, as well as several nearby establishments and houses are also damaged. XFM Zamboanga took off-the-air for the time being for technical adjustments and the safety of its personnel.

== Global Satellite stations ==
=== TV stations ===
Analog

Branding	Callsign	Ch. #	Power	Station Type	Location
GNN TV-30 Ilocos Sur	DZWR	30	20 kW	Originating	Ilocos Sur

Digital

Branding	Callsign	Ch. #	Frequency	Power	Area of Coverage
GNN TV-44 Baguio	DWFB	44	653.143 MHz	1 kW (5 kW ERP)	Baguio
GNN TV-48 Naga	DWFA	48	677.143 MHz	1 kW (5 kW ERP)	Naga
GNN TV-45 Cebu	DYFA	45	659.143 MHz	1 kW (5 kW ERP)	Cebu
GNN TV-41 Davao	DXOW	41	635.143 MHz	1 kW (5 kW ERP)	Davao
GNN TV-43 Zamboanga	DXFA	43	647.143 MHz	1 kW (5 kW ERP)	Zamboanga

Affiliate stations

Branding	Callsign	Ch. #	Frequency	Power	Owner	Area of Coverage
GNN TV-47 Manila	DWDZ	47	671.143 MHz	3.5 kW	Interactive Broadcast Media	Mega Manila
GNN TV-44 Pampanga	DWFU	44	653.143 MHz	1 kW	Infomax Media	Pampanga

GNN on Cable/Satellite

Cable/Satellite	Ch. #	Coverage
G Sat	1	Nationwide
Sky Cable	73	Mega Manila
Sky TV	44	Nationwide
Cablelink	213 (Digital)	Mega Manila, Cavite, Tarlac
Parasat	45	Regional

=== Radio stations ===
Branding	Callsign	Frequency	Power	Location
XFM Zamboanga (Note: Operated by Y2H Broadcasting Network, Inc.)	DXLA	99.5 MHz	5 kW	Zamboanga City
Radyo Dansalan	DXGS	104.1 MHz	1 kW	Marawi

== Affiliations ==
- BBC
- ABS-CBN
- GMA Network
- Voice of America
- Golden Nation Network
