= DXGS-FM =

Radyo Dansalan (DXGS)
- Marawi; Philippines
- Broadcast area: Lanao del Norte and Lanao del Sur
- Frequency: 104.1 MHz
- Branding: 104.1 Radyo Dansalan

Programming
- Languages: Maranao, Cebuano
- Format: Islamic Radio

Ownership
- Owner: Global Satellite Technology Services

History
- First air date: 2019
- Former frequencies: 92.1 MHz
- Call sign meaning: Global Satellite

Technical information
- Licensing authority: NTC
- Power: 5,000 watts

DXGS (104.1 FM) Radyo Dansalan is a radio station owned and operated by Global Satellite Technology Services. The station's studio is located at Brgy. Tubacan, Marawi.
