= DZTP =

Philippine radio station

Radyo Tirad Pass (DZTP)
- Candon; Philippines
- Broadcast area: Ilocos Sur, Abra and surrounding areas
- Frequency: 693 kHz
- Branding: Radyo Tirad Pass

Programming
- Languages: Ilocano, Filipino
- Format: News, Public Affairs, Talk
- Affiliations: RMN Networks

Ownership
- Owner: Tirad Pass Radio-Television Broadcasting Network

History
- First air date: January 8, 1995
- Former frequencies: 1467 kHz
- Call sign meaning: Tirad Pass

Technical information
- Licensing authority: NTC
- Power: 10,000 watts

Links
- Website: https://dztp.wordpress.com/

DZTP (693 AM) Radyo Tirad Pass is a radio station owned and operated by Tirad Pass Radio-Television Broadcasting Network. The station's studio and transmitter are located in Brgy. San Nicolas, Candon.
