= Golden Nation Network =

Philippine television news channel

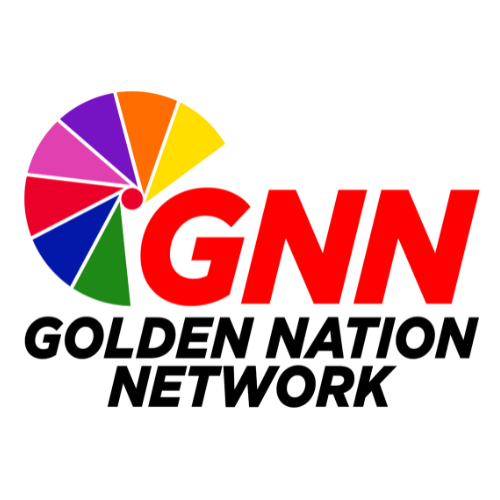
- Official logo (2025)
- Country: Philippines
- Headquarters: First Global Building, Gamboa cor. Adelantado St., Legazpi Village, Makati, Metro Manila

Programming
- Languages: Tagalog, English
- Picture format: 720p/1080i HDTV (downscaled to 16:9 480i for the SDTV feed)

Ownership
- Owner: Global Satellite Technology Services
- Sister channels: Global Pinoy Cinema (defunct)

History
- Launched: January 6, 2003; 23 years ago

Links
- Website: gnn.com.ph

Availability

Terrestrial
- Various local free-to-air channels (nationwide)

Golden Nation Network (GNN) is a national news and public affairs television channel in the Philippines owned by Global Satellite Technology Services (GSTS), operator of GSAT Direct TV. GNN was established in 2019 by a team of broadcast industry veterans with the aim of offering a credible, well-rounded alternative to mainstream media.

The channel is known for its news coverage, public service programming, government affairs reporting, and civic engagement initiatives.

== History ==
GNN was founded in 2019 as a successor to Global Kabayan TV (2003–2006), Philippine Cable Television (2006–2008) and Global News Network (2008–2019) and briefly rebranded as One Media Network (2019–2021; 2023–2024). The Golden Nation Network branding was officially relaunched in January 2025 to unify its nationwide presence and reinforce its identity as a public-oriented broadcaster.

Originally available through GSAT Channel 1, GNN expanded its coverage via free-to-air television stations and cable providers, and further expand its presence through digital platforms including social media channels and YouTube. The network restructured its operations to focus more on high-impact journalism and government transparency initiatives. It now reaches over 10 million viewers across the country.

== Coverage and distribution ==
GNN broadcasts from its headquarters in Makati City, with satellite operations in Carmona, Cavite. It has a nationwide presence via:

- GSAT Direct to Home TV (SES-9) – Channel 1
- Sky Cable – Channel 73 (Metro Manila)
- Sky TV – Channel 44 (Nationwide)
- Cablelink – Channel 213 (Metro Manila, Cavite, Laguna, Tarlac, and Bulacan)
- Various provincial pay TV providers (including Asian Vision, Parasat, etc.)
- Free-to-air digital terrestrial TV stations in Metro Manila, Baguio, Pampanga, and Naga (Camarines Sur).

== TV stations ==
=== Digital ===
Branding	Callsign	Channel	Frequency	Location
GNN Baguio	DWFB	44	653.143 MHz	Mt. Sto. Tomas
GNN Pampanga	DWFU	44	653.143 MHz	San Fernando
GNN Naga	DWFA	48	677.143 MHz	Naga

=== Digital affiliate ===
Branding	Callsign	Channel	Frequency	Location
GNN Manila	DWDZ (Note: Licensed to Interactive Broadcast Media)	47	671.143 MHz	Cavite

== Programming ==
GNN’s content is structured with a combination of live coverage, studio programs, public affairs, and documentaries.

=== Current programming ===
- Barangay and Police Patrol
- Chinatown TV
- Face the Nation
- GNN NewsForce
- Opinyon Ngayon
- The People's Court
- Sa Barangay Tayo
- The Fourth Estate
- GNN Times
- Island Living
- DW on GNN
- Miss Arriba
- Ganda Mo Pangasinan
- What's Up Doc?
- Tsismaxxx
- Millennial TV
- Window To The World

== Digital and Social Media ==
GNN has a digital presence through its official website and social platforms.

== See also ==
- G Sat
- Media in the Philippines
- Television in the Philippines
