= Parasat Cable Television =

Philippines cable television operator

Parasat Cable TV, Inc.
- Formerly: Cable 21 Technologies
- Type: Private
- Industry: Telecommunications
- Founded: 1991; 35 years ago
- Headquarters: Cagayan de Oro, Philippines
- Area served: Cagayan de Oro; Some parts of Misamis Oriental, Bukidnon, and Lanao del Norte; San Carlos, Negros Occidental, some parts of Davao City
- Key people: Engr. Elpidio M. Paras
- Products: Cable television, fiber broadband internet
- Owner: Parasat Cable Television, Incorporated
- Website: parasat.tv

Parasat Cable TV, Inc. (stylized upper case as PARASAT with a satellite dish icon) is a Philippine cable television operator billed as Mindanao's only digital television system and fiber broadband internet provider. It is based in Cagayan de Oro and started as an electronic retail store and repair shop established by Engr. Elpidio M. Paras. It was known as Paras Industrial Systems.

== History and company background ==
Parasat Cable TV, Inc. started as a local electronics retail store and repair shop in Cagayan de Oro, established by Elpidio M. Paras in the late 1970s under the name Paras Industrial Systems. The company later transitioned into the cable television business, focusing on CATV services in the Cagayan de Oro area.
