= List of radio stations in Misamis Oriental =

Below is a list of radio stations in Misamis Oriental, whose coverage is in part or whole of the same (including Cagayan de Oro).

== Cagayan de Oro ==
=== AM Stations ===
Frequency	Branding	Company	Format	Callsign	Power
729 kHz	Bombo Radyo Cagayan de Oro	Newsounds Broadcasting Network, Inc. (Note: Operated by People's Broadcasting Service, Inc.)	News, Public Service, Talk Radio	DXIF	10 kW
828 kHz	RMN Cagayan de Oro	Radio Mindanao Network, Inc.	Music, News, Public Service, Talk Radio	DXCC	10 kW
936 kHz (Note: Off the air as an AM/FM radio station.)	Radyo Pilipinas Cagayan de Oro (Note: Operating through an internet/streaming radio station at the moment.)	Presidential Broadcasting Service	News, Government Radio, Talk Radio	DXIM	—N/a
1044 kHz	Radyo Pilipino Cagayan de Oro	Radyo Pilipino Corp.	Music, News, Talk Radio	DXCO	5 kW
1368 kHz	Radyo Ronda Cagayan de Oro	Radio Philippines Network, Inc.	Music, News, Talk Radio	DXKO	10 kW

=== FM Stations ===
Frequency	Branding	Company	Format	Callsign	Power
88.5 MHz	RJFM Cagayan de Oro (Note: Relay station of DZRJ 100.3 RJFM Manila.)	Free Air Broadcasting Network, Inc. (Note: Operated by Rajah Broadcasting Network, Inc.)	Adult Hits	DXRJ	10 kW
89.3 MHz	K5 News FM Cagayan de Oro	Quest Broadcasting, Inc. (SBS Radio Network) (Note: Operated by 5K Broadcasting Network, Inc.)	Contemporary MOR, OPM, News, Talk	DXKB	10 kW
90.3 MHz	Strong Radio	Katigbak Enterprises, Inc. (Note: Operated by Saturn Media Advertising and Digital Marketing Corporation.)	Classic Hits, News, Talk	DXKI	10 kW
91.1 MHz	Juander Radyo Cagayan de Oro	Malindang Broadcasting Network Corporation (Note: Operated by RSV Broadcasting Network, Inc.)	Contemporary MOR, News, Talk	—N/a	10 kW (Note: Transmitter location in Laguindingan.)
91.9 MHz	Marian Radio	Catholic Bishops Conference of the Philippines (Note: Operated by Archdiocese of Cagayan de Oro.)	Religious Radio	PA	10 kW
92.7 MHz	Heart FM Cagayan de Oro	Cagayan de Oro Media Corporation (Note: Operated by Highland Broadcasting Network Corporation.)	Soft AC, OPM, News	DXOC	5 kW
93.5 MHz	Home Radio Cagayan de Oro	Aliw Broadcasting Corporation	Soft AC	DXQR	10 kW
94.3 MHz	Wild FM Cagayan de Oro	University of Mindanao Broadcasting Network, Inc.	Contemporary MOR, OPM	DXWZ	10 kW
95.7 MHz	Radyo Trumpeta Cagayan de Oro	FBS Radio Network	Contemporary MOR, News, Talk	DXBL	10 kW
96.9 MHz	Easy Rock Cagayan de Oro	Manila Broadcasting Company	Soft Adult Contemporary	DXKS	10 kW
98.7 MHz	Vanzy FM	—N/a	Soft Adult Contemporary	DXJS	1 kW
99.1 MHz	iFM News Cagayan de Oro	Radio Mindanao Network, Inc.	Contemporary MOR, News, Talk	DXVM	10 kW (Note: Transmitter location in Opol.)
99.9 MHz	Magnum Radyo	Reliance Broadcasting Unlimited, Inc. (Note: Operated by Radyo de Oro Corporation.)	Contemporary MOR, News, Talk	DXMR	10 kW
100.7 MHz	Barangay LS Cagayan de Oro	GMA Network, Inc.	Contemporary MOR, OPM	DXLX	5 kW
101.5 MHz	True FM Cagayan de Oro (Note: Relay station of DWLA 105.9 True FM Manila.)	Nation Broadcasting Corporation (Note: Operated by TV5 Network, Inc.)	News, Public Affairs, Talk	DXRL	10 kW
102.5 MHz	Brigada News FM Cagayan de Oro	Baycomms Broadcasting Corporation (Note: Operated by Brigada Mass Media Corporation.)	Contemporary MOR, News, Talk	DXMM	10 kW
103.3 MHz	The New J	Sarraga Intg. & Mgmt. Corp. (Note: Operated by Far East Broadcasting Company.)	CCM, Religious Radio	DXJL	2.5 kW
103.9 MHz	G103.9 Gold Radio	Ultracraft Broadcasting Corporation	News, Talk Radio, Public Affairs	DXGR	15 kW
104.7 MHz	Yes FM Cagayan de Oro	Philippine Broadcasting Corporation (Note: Operated by Manila Broadcasting Company.)	Contemporary MOR, OPM	DXYR	10 kW
106.3 MHz	Radyo Natin Cagayan de Oro	Cebu Broadcasting Company	Community Radio, Music	DXHY	10 kW
107.9 MHz	Win Radio Cagayan de Oro	Mabuhay Broadcasting System, Inc. (Note: Operated by ZimZam Management, Inc.)	Contemporary MOR, OPM	DXNY	10 kW

== Gingoog ==
=== AM Stations ===
Frequency	Branding	Company	Format	Callsign	Power
882 kHz	Radyo Pilipinas Gingoog	Presidential Broadcast Service	News, Talk Radio	DXRG	10 kW

=== FM Stations ===
Frequency	Branding	Company	Format	Callsign	Power
90.5 MHz	Energy FM Gingoog	Ultrasonic Broadcasting System, Inc. (Note: Operated by 5K Broadcasting Network, Inc.)	Contemporary MOR, OPM, News	DXQU	5 kW
92.9 MHz	Mellow Touch Gingoog	FBS Radio Network	Soft AC, News, Talk	—N/a	5 kW
95.3 MHz	Mark Radio Gingoog	—N/a	Community Radio	—N/a	5 kW
99.3 MHz	Juander Radyo Gingoog (Note: Relay station of 91.1 Juander Radyo Cagayan de Oro.)	RMC Broadcasting Corporation (Note: Operated by RSV Broadcasting Network, Inc.)	Contemporary MOR, News, Talk	DXOG	5 kW
101.7 MHz	Prime FM Gingoog	Prime Broadcasting Network	News, Health Radio, Music	DXPT	10 kW
104.9 MHz	Real Beat Radio	PEC Broadcasting Corporation	Contemporary MOR, OPM, Talk	—N/a	5 kW
105.7 MHz	Radyo Natin Gingoog	Manila Broadcasting Company (Note: Operated by Goodluck Radio Network.)	Community Radio	DXRS	5 kW

== Misamis Oriental ==
=== FM Stations ===
Frequency	Branding	Company	Format	Callsign	Power	Location
87.5 MHz	MISOR Radyo	—N/a	Contemporary MOR, News, Talk	—N/a	5 kW	Tagoloan
93.7 MHz	i93.7 Radio Initao	—N/a	Community Radio, Music	—N/a	1 kW	Initao
94.1 MHz	Power Lite FM	—N/a	Community Radio, Music	—N/a	1 kW	Initao
94.9 MHz	Radyo Kaibigan Laguindingan	Amapola Broadcasting System, Inc.	Contemporary MOR, News, Talk	DXDD	1 kW	Laguindingan
97.9 MHz	Power Radio Villanueva	JL Broadcast Media	News, Talk, Contemporary MOR	DXPQ	5 kW	Villanueva
100.3 MHz	Infinite Radio Sugbongcogon	St. Jude Thaddeus Institute of Technology	Contemporary MOR, OPM, News, Talk	DXUN	5 kW	Sugbongcogon
103.7 MHz	Lite FM Medina	Presidential Broadcast Service	Contemporary MOR, News, Talk	DXPU	1 kW	Medina
104.3 MHz	Tiger FM Sugbongcogon	Amapola Broadcasting System, Inc.	Contemporary MOR, News, Talk	DXDD	1 kW	Sugbongcogon
105.5 MHz	Bay Radio Balingasag	Mindanao Institute of Technology	Contemporary MOR, News, Talk	—N/a	1 kW	Balingasag

== TBD (To Be Determined) ==
=== AM Stations ===
Frequency	Remarks

=== FM Stations ===
Frequency	Remarks
