= Metro Cagayan de Oro =

Metro Cagayan de Oro Kaulohang Cagayan de Oro
- Metropolitan Area
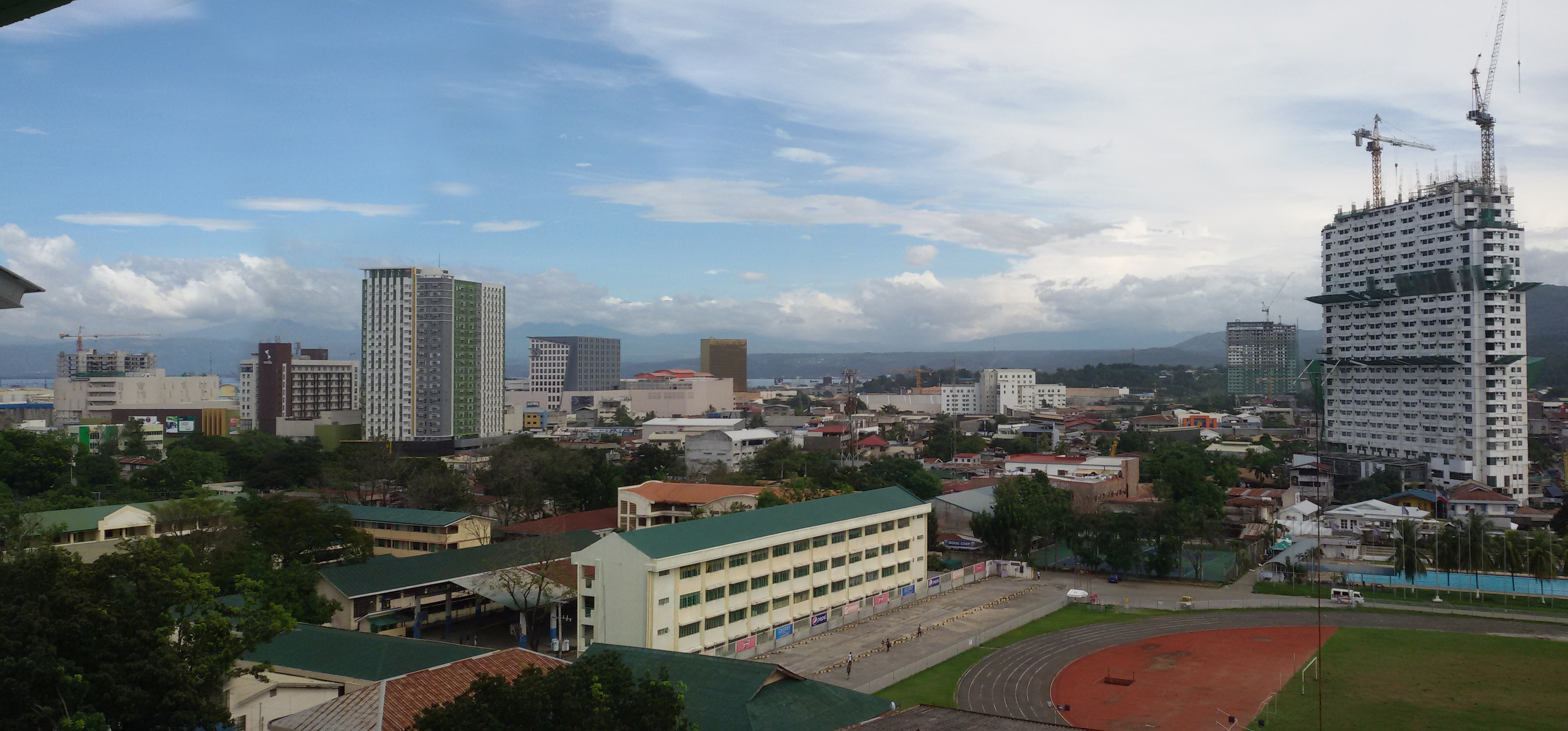
- City Skyline of Metro Cagayan de Oro as of January 2018
- Nickname: Metro CDO
- Metro Cagayan de Oro within Misamis Oriental and Bukidnon
- Interactive map of Metro Cagayan de Oro
- Coordinates: 8°29′N 124°39′E
- Country: Philippines
- Region: Northern Mindanao (Region X)
- Province: Misamis Oriental (capital); Bukidnon
- Cities and Municipalities: 22

Area
  - Total: 4,891.37 km^{2} (1,888.57 sq mi)

Population (2020)
  - Total: 1,687,159
  - Density: 345/km^{2} (890/sq mi)
  - Languages: Cebuano; Maranao; Higaonon; Bukid; Subanon; Hiligaynon; Ilocano; English

Divisions
  - Highly urbanized cities: 1: Cagayan de Oro
  - Component cities: 1: El Salvador
  - Municipalities: 20: Alubijid; Balingasag; Baungon; Claveria; Gitagum; Initao; Jasaan; Laguindingan; Libertad; Libona; Lugait; Malitbog, Bukidnon; Manolo Fortich; Manticao; Naawan; Opol; Sumilao; Tagoloan; Talakag; Villanueva
- Time zone: UTC+8 (PST)

Metropolitan Cagayan de Oro (Cebuano: Kaulohang Cagayan de Oro; Filipino: Kalakhang Cagayan de Oro), also known as Metro Cagayan de Oro, is the fourth largest metropolitan area in the Philippines. It is located on the northern coast of Mindanao and comprises the two chartered cities of Cagayan de Oro and El Salvador and the fourteen municipalities of Misamis Oriental which are Alubijid, Balingasag, Claveria, Gitagum, Initao, Jasaan, Laguindingan, Libertad, Lugait, Manticao, Naawan, Opol, Tagoloan and Villanueva and the six municipalities of Bukidnon which are Manolo Fortich, Baungon, Libona, Malitbog, Sumilao and Talakag. According to the 2020 Philippine census, Metro Cagayan de Oro has a population of 1,687,159 people.

== Geography ==
Metro Cagayan de Oro is bounded by Macajalar Bay, which curves north. Forty percent of its area is elevated plains, located partially in Bukidnon. In the western portion the Cagayan de Oro River outlines the area, which is divided by the river's tributaries from district 1 of Cagayan de Oro to Gitagum (including Laguindingan, Alubijid, El Salvador and Opol). The eastern and southern regions run from district 2 of Cagayan de Oro to Tagoloan to Claveria and Malitbog to Talakag, which is bordered by Bukidnon-Central Mindanao and Lanao del Norte.

Metro Cagayan comprises hills and mountain ranges, mountains and rain forests. Its biodiversity and greenery helps keep the area's temperature cool. The southern portion has semi-active volcanoes in the Kalatungan Mountain Range, although the Philippine Institute of Volcanology and Seismology (PhilVolcs) maintains that there is little risk of eruption or earthquakes.

== Climate ==
Under the Köppen climate classification system Cagayan de Oro has a tropical climate, with an annual average temperature of 28 °C (82 °F). In June 1998, the city recorded its highest temperature to date, 39 °C (102 °F). The city receives a varying amount of rainfall throughout the year; March and April are the driest months, and August and September the wettest. The rainy season lasts from June to November, and the drier season from December to May. The city lies outside the typhoon belt, but is affected by the Intertropical Convergence Zone.

Climate data for Cagayan de Oro (Lumbia Airport) 1991–2020, extremes 1979–2020
Month	Jan	Feb	Mar	Apr	May	Jun	Jul	Aug	Sep	Oct	Nov	Dec	Year
Record high °C (°F)	36.2 (97.2)	36.0 (96.8)	37.6 (99.7)	37.0 (98.6)	38.2 (100.8)	38.4 (101.1)	36.2 (97.2)	37.8 (100.0)	36.7 (98.1)	35.2 (95.4)	34.7 (94.5)	34.4 (93.9)	38.4 (101.1)
Mean daily maximum °C (°F)	29.8 (85.6)	30.3 (86.5)	31.4 (88.5)	32.6 (90.7)	33.0 (91.4)	32.1 (89.8)	31.7 (89.1)	32.2 (90.0)	32.1 (89.8)	31.5 (88.7)	31.1 (88.0)	30.4 (86.7)	31.5 (88.7)
Daily mean °C (°F)	25.8 (78.4)	26.0 (78.8)	26.7 (80.1)	27.6 (81.7)	28.1 (82.6)	27.5 (81.5)	27.2 (81.0)	27.4 (81.3)	27.3 (81.1)	27.0 (80.6)	26.7 (80.1)	26.3 (79.3)	27.0 (80.6)
Mean daily minimum °C (°F)	21.7 (71.1)	21.6 (70.9)	21.9 (71.4)	22.7 (72.9)	23.3 (73.9)	22.9 (73.2)	22.6 (72.7)	22.6 (72.7)	22.5 (72.5)	22.4 (72.3)	22.2 (72.0)	22.1 (71.8)	22.4 (72.3)
Record low °C (°F)	16.1 (61.0)	17.1 (62.8)	17.1 (62.8)	18.0 (64.4)	20.7 (69.3)	20.0 (68.0)	20.0 (68.0)	19.4 (66.9)	19.0 (66.2)	19.0 (66.2)	18.0 (64.4)	17.8 (64.0)	16.1 (61.0)
Average rainfall mm (inches)	97.6 (3.84)	85.3 (3.36)	57.6 (2.27)	62.1 (2.44)	128.9 (5.07)	220.1 (8.67)	247.3 (9.74)	197.4 (7.77)	220.8 (8.69)	191.6 (7.54)	127.1 (5.00)	137.5 (5.41)	1,773.3 (69.81)
Average rainy days (≥ 0.1 mm)	10	8	6	6	11	16	17	14	15	14	10	9	136
Average relative humidity (%)	85	84	81	79	80	83	84	82	83	84	84	85	83
Source: PAGASA

== Government ==
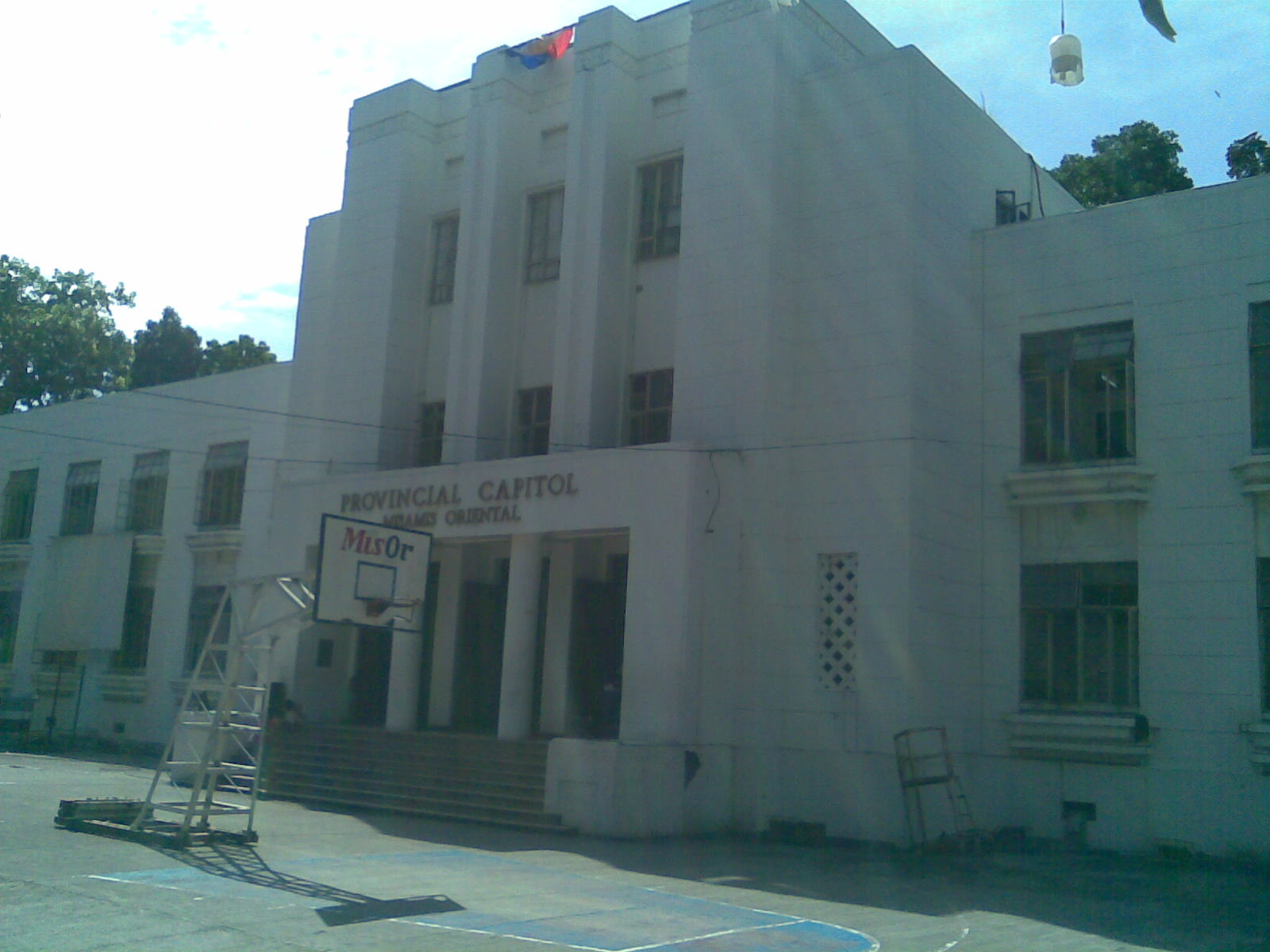
Misamis Oriental provincial capitol building

Cagayan de Oro is a chartered city which is geographically located in Misamis Oriental. Although, the provincial capitol of Misamis Oriental is located in Cagayan de Oro, the provincial government has no administrative authority and jurisdiction over the city government of Cagayan de Oro.

Metro Cagayan de Oro has the fourth-largest population in the Philippines, and is the third-largest metropolitan area geographically. Cagayan de Oro City is the center of the Metro Cagayan de Oro, the emerging 4th metropolis of the country. Metro Cagayan de Oro covers municipalities in eastern and western Misamis Oriental and northern Bukidnon.

Cities or municipalities	Province	Barangays	Population (2020)	Income class
Cagayan de Oro	Misamis Oriental (geographical only)	80	728,402	1st Class City; Highly urbanized
El Salvador	Misamis Oriental	15	58,771	4th class component city
Balingasag	Misamis Oriental	30	74,385	1st Class Municipality
Libertad	Misamis Oriental	39	12,948	5th Class Municipality
Claveria	Misamis Oriental	24	52,478	1st Class Municipality
Tagoloan	Misamis Oriental	10	80,319	1st Class Municipality
Laguindingan	Misamis Oriental	11	26,363	4th Class Municipality
Manticao	Misamis Oriental	13	29,469	2nd Class Municipality
Opol	Misamis Oriental	14	66,327	2nd Class Municipality
Naawan	Misamis Oriental	10	22,444	4th Class Municipality
Jasaan	Misamis Oriental	15	57,055	2nd Class Municipality
Lugait	Misamis Oriental	8	20,559	2nd Class Municipality
Alubijid	Misamis Oriental	16	32,163	4th Class Municipality
Gitagum	Misamis Oriental	11	17,920	5th Class Municipality
Initao	Misamis Oriental	16	33,902	3rd Class Municipality
Villanueva	Misamis Oriental	11	40,419	2nd Class Municipality
Manolo Fortich	Bukidnon	22	113,200	1st Class Municipality
Talakag	Bukidnon	29	77,027	1st Class Municipality
Malitbog	Bukidnon	11	26,741	2nd Class Municipality
Baungon	Bukidnon	16	37,111	2nd Class Municipality
Libona	Bukidnon	14	48,965	1st Class Municipality
Sumilao	Bukidnon	10	29,531	4th Class Municipality

Since the 1986 People Power Revolution, political power has returned to Misamis Oriental. Each city and municipality is self-governing, divided into barangays led by mayors.

== Demographics ==
Metro Cagayan de Oro is inhabited by distinct Visayan (notably Cebuano-speaking majority) and Lumad cultural communities. Several cultural minorities exist in central Mindanao (Talakag, Sumilao and Baungon), including the Bagobos, Subanons and Badjaos. It has also some sizeable minorities hailing from Luzon, such as Bicolanos, Ilocanos, Kapampangans and Tagalogs, and Hiligaynons from Panay and Negros Occidental. The city of Cagayan de Oro has a population of 675,950 people, making it the most-populous city in northern Mindanao and the tenth in the country.

=== Religion ===
Religion in Metro Cagayan de Oro
religion	percentage
Roman Catholic	83%
Islam	10%
Protestant/Evangelical	4%
None	1%
Buddhist	1%
Others	1%

Roman Catholicism is the predominant religion, although Protestant denominations, such as the United Church, the Seventh-day Adventist Church and the Iglesia Filipina Independiente (Philippine Independent Church), as well as Evangelical Pentecostals, are increasing in numbers.

Followers of Islam are mostly Maranao and Maguindanaon traders and migrants, as well as converts known as the Balik Islam.

=== Population ===
About 44 percent of households in Metro Cagayan de Oro classify themselves as Bisaya, 22.15 percent as Cebuano and 4.38 percent as Boholano; 28.07 percent are from other ethnic groups, including Maranao, Higaonon and Bukidnon. The rest of the areas' population includes migrants and their descendants from Luzon and other parts of Visayas, such as Bicolanos, Ilocanos, Kapampangans, Tagalogs and Hiligaynons. In addition to the city of Cagayan de Oro, there is rapid growth in nearby cities and municipalities (including Tagoloan and El Salvador). According to the Statistical Yearbook of the Philippines, this urban growth is a result of migration from neighboring provinces.

Cultural communities and ethnic groups living primarily in remote areas of Talakag, Baungon and Bukidnon include the Maranaos, Maguindanaons, Tausugs, Higaonons, Subanens, Binukid, T’boli and Bagobo. These groups have declined in population by about 12 percent since 2000 and, despite comprising 20.4 percent of the population of Mindanao, they experience discrimination in Filipino society.

== Economy ==
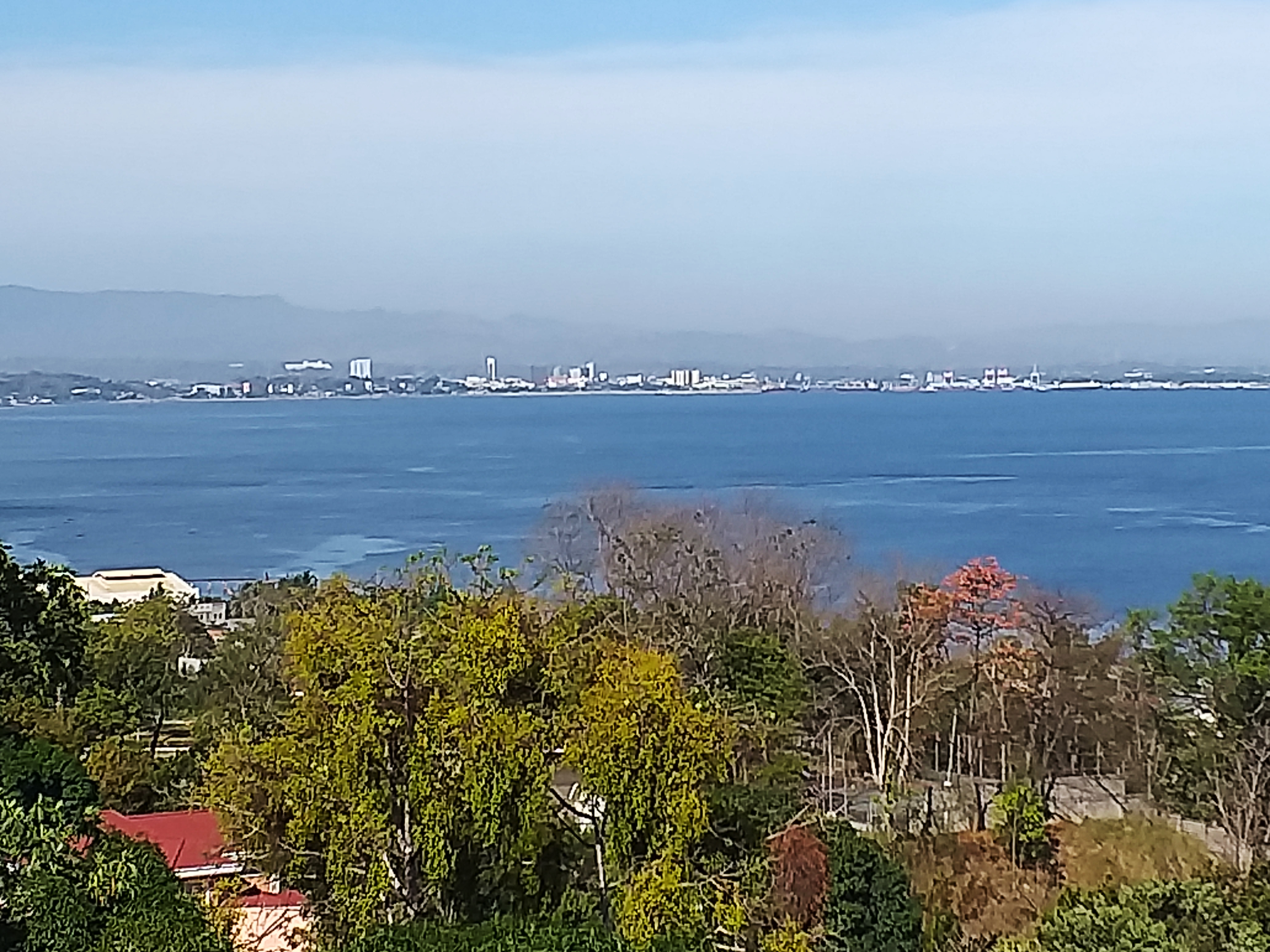
Metro Cagayan de Oro as seen from Puerto Ridge

Cagayan de Oro is the "melting pot of Mindanao" because of its accessibility, business growth and attractions. It is a business hub of the northern Mindanao region, with a reported income of ₱1.8 billion in fiscal year 2010. The city's economy is based on industry, commerce, trade, services and tourism. The city of Cagayan de Oro reported seven billion pesos in investment during the first six months of 2012, primarily in the service and industrial sectors. Investment in Metro Cagayan de Oro focuses on tourism, agriculture and the hospitality industry.

== Healthcare ==
Metro Cagayan de Oro has a number of hospitals:

In addition, Every municipalities has public health center and/or mini-hospital that caters their constituents for minor health cases under the supervision of Local government Units and Department of Health.

=== Public ===
- J.R. Borja Memorial Hospital City Hospital
- German Doctors Hospital (indefinitely closed since 2011)
- Northern Mindanao Medical Center

=== Private ===
- ACE Medical Center
- Cagayan de Oro Medical Center
- Capitol University Medical Center
- Madonna and Child Hospital
- Maria Reyna Xavier University Hospital
- Orthopedic Rehab Institute
- Polymedic Medical Group
  - Cagayan Polymedic General Hospital
  - Cagayan Polymedic General Plaza
  - Tagoloan Polymedic General Hospital
- Puerto General Hospital
- Sabal General Hospital
- Saint Francis Doctors' Hospital

== Education ==
Education, which has the largest share (about 40 percent) of the Metro Cagayan de Oro budget, is supervised by the Northern Mindanao Region X Department of Education. The 2010 census counted 203 schools in the metropolis, including seven universities, 17 colleges, 52 high schools and 64 elementary and primary schools (primarily in urban areas). The student population of Metro Cagayan de Oro is estimated at 380,580.

Colleges and universities in Metro Cagayan de Oro are:

=== Colleges ===
==== Public ====
- City College of Cagayan de Oro
- City College of El Salvador
- Initao College
- Northern Bukidnon State College
- Opol Community College
- Tagoloan Community College

==== Private ====
- AMA Computer College - Cagayan de Oro
- Blessed Mother College
- Cagayan de Oro College – PHINMA Education Network
- Colegio de Santo Niño de Jasaan
- Informatics Computer Institute of Cagayan de Oro
- Lourdes College
- New El Salvador Colleges
- Pilgrim Christian College
- STI College – Cagayan de Oro
- Southern de Oro Philippines College
- St. Rita's College of Balingasag

=== Universities ===
==== Public ====
- Bukidnon State University
- Mindanao State University at Naawan
- University of Science and Technology of Southern Philippines

==== Private ====
- Capitol University
- Liceo de Cagayan University
- Xavier University – Ateneo de Cagayan

== Media ==
=== Television ===
==== Analog ====
- DXAL TV-4 (ALLTV2)
- DXCC TV-10 (IBC)
- DXTE TV-21 (TV5)
- DXCO TV-29 (One Sports)
- DXJC TV-35 (GMA)

==== Digital ====
- DXAL DTV-16 (ALLTV2)
- DXCC DTV-17 (IBC13)
- DXTE DTV-18 (TV5)
- DXEV DTV-20 (A2Z)
- DXBA DTV-43 (PRTV PRIME)
- DXDZ DTV-47 (GMA)
- PA DTV-51 (JAO TV)

==== Cable ====
- RPN (5 - Parasat Cable TV)

=== Radio ===
==== AM Frequency ====
- DXIF 729 (Bombo Radyo)
- DXCC 828 (RMN DXCC)
- DXIM 936 (Radyo Pilipinas) (Note: Off the air as an AM/FM radio station.) (Note: Operating through an internet/streaming radio station at the moment.)
- DXCO 1044 (Radyo Pilipino)
- DXKO 1368 (RPN Radyo Ronda)

==== FM Frequency ====
- DXRJ 88.5 (RJFM)
- DXKB 89.3 (K5 News FM)
- DXKI 90.3 (Strong Radio)
- 91.1 (Juander Radyo)
- PA 91.9 (Marian Radio)
- DXOC 92.7 (Heart FM)
- DXQR 93.5 (Home Radio)
- DXWZ 94.3 (Wild FM)
- DXBL 95.7 (Radyo Trumpeta)
- DXKS 96.9 (Easy Rock)
- DXJS 98.7 (Vanzy FM)
- DXVM 99.1 (iFM News)
- DXMR 99.9 (Magnum Radyo)
- DXLX 100.7 (Barangay LS)
- DXRL 101.5 (True FM)
- DXMM 102.5 (Brigada News FM)
- DXJL 103.3 (The New J)
- DXGR 103.9 (G103 Gold Radio)
- DXYR 104.7 (Yes FM)
- DXHY 106.3 (Radyo Natin)
- DXNY 107.9 (Win Radio)

=== Cable TV (Local) ===
- Parasat Cable Television
- Jade Cable TV

=== Newspaper ===
- Cagayan de Oro Journal
- Cagayan de Oro Times
- SuperBalita Cagayan de Oro
- SunStar
- Mindanao Post

=== Newscast ===
- One Mindanao (GMA TV-35/DTV-47 Cagayan de Oro, simulcast on GMA TV-5/DTV-37 Davao)

==== Defunct ====
- TV Patrol North Mindanao (ABS-CBN TV-23/DTV-40 Cagayan de Oro)

== Transportation ==
=== Land ===
Metro Cagayan de Oro is accessible by land from several cities and municipalities in Mindanao. There are three bus and jeepney terminals with regular service: Agora Integrated Bus Terminal, Eastbound-Gusa Jeepney Terminal and Westbound-Bulua Integrated Bus and Jeepney Terminal.

=== Air ===
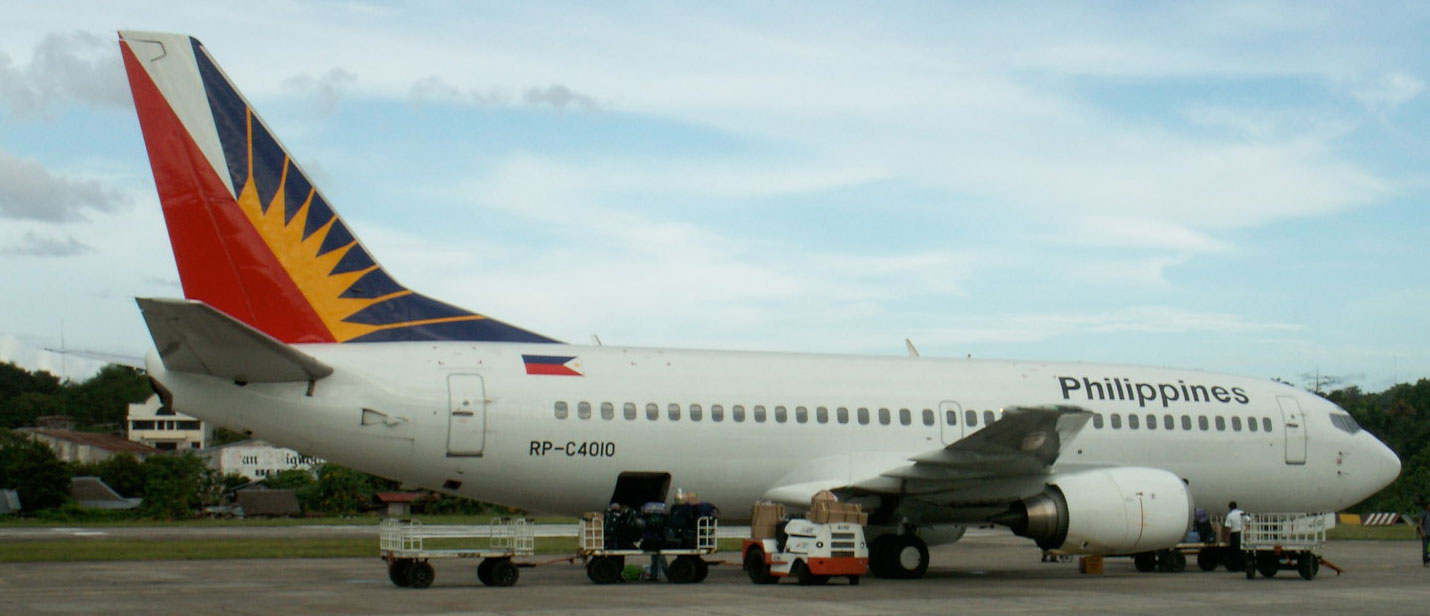
Boeing 737-300 at Lumbia Airport

Lumbia Airport, also known as Cagayan de Oro Airport (now Lumbia Airfield), hosted domestic service to Manila, Cebu, Davao and Iloilo. Manila is 75 minutes away by air, Iloilo one hour and Cebu 45 minutes, and Davao 25 minutes. It was the second-busiest airport in Mindanao, after Francisco Bangoy International Airport in Davao City.

Laguindingan International Airport (which opened June 15, 2013, replacing Lumbia) is in the municipality of Laguindingan. It serves northern Mindanao (including Iligan and Cagayan de Oro), offering domestic service throughout the Philippines. It will offer international flights in the future.

=== Sea ===
Cagayan de Oro Port is an international seaport situated near the estuary of the Cagayan de Oro River. It has an anchorage depth of 18 metres (59 ft), with two cargo-handling operators. With the recent completion of the 250 million peso rehabilitation project, it is the largest seaport in Mindanao. The port has regular service to Manila, Cebu, Tagbilaran, Bacolod, Dumaguete, Iloilo and Jagna.

== See also ==
- Metro Manila
