= DXCO =

DXCO may refer to the following stations in Cagayan de Oro:

- DXCO-AM (1044 AM), branded as Radyo Pilipino
- DXCO-FM (92.7 FM), branded as Heart FM
- DXCO-TV (channel 29), branded as RPTV
