= Celebration International Church (Philippines) =

- Location: Capistrano St. Cagayan de Oro
- Country: Philippines
- Website: www.CIchurch.com.ph

History
- Founder: N/A

Administration
- Metropolis: Cagayan de Oro

Clergy
- Pastor: John David Moncada

Celebration International Church is a Pentecostal international church, a denomination affiliated with the Christian Conference of Asia. This fellowship is located in Cagayan de Oro, Philippines. The church's senior pastor, Alex Eduave, started the church in 2000. After 5 years, the center attracted 735 people to services.

== Leadership ==
It is a mother church combining 4 tributary affiliated churches. The principal companionship constellation has a member of about 200 people, giving it the highest attendance for a Pentecostal church in the city.

Eight zone leaders preside. It has 2 pastors, 3 cell leaders and corresponding superiors. Accordingly, the church mass involve one head pastor with senior pastors, casting to zone pastors and other contributing members. The youth body has one youth organizer and youth members who help run church services.

=== Affiliated countries ===
- United States
- Australia
- Lebanon
- Saudi Arabia
- Iraq
- Israel
- Canada
- India
- South Korea
- Egypt
- Myanmar
- Indonesia
- Malaysia
- China

== Ministry ==
Celebration International Church runs different ministries. Celebration International, like other churches, runs a group structure of "cell groups". Every group has approximately 10-20 members who meet on different places.

Celebration International Church offers leadership training, contemporary praise and worship and specialized youth, children's and media ministries.

== Music ==
The church predominantly used bilingual Hillsong Music along with Filipino and Cebuano compositions.

== See also ==
- Hillsong Church
- Christian Conference of Asia
