= DXJR =

Radio station in Bukidnon, Philippines

- Manolo Fortich; Philippines
- Broadcast area: Northern Bukidnon, Central Misamis Oriental
- Frequency: 1575 kHz

Programming
- Format: Silent

Ownership
- Owner: Cagayan de Oro Media Corporation
- Sister stations: 92.7 Heart FM Cagayan de Oro

History
- First air date: 2005
- Last air date: January 2019
- Former names: Media Higala (2010–2012); Radyo ni Juan (2014–2017); Radyo Lumad (2017–2019)

Technical information
- Licensing authority: NTC

DXJR (1575 AM) was a radio station owned by Cagayan de Oro Media Corporation. After existing as a commercial station in Cagayan de Oro from 2005 to 2012, it left the air before being taken over by the Rizal Memorial Colleges Broadcasting Corporation in 2014 and moved to Manolo Fortich. After being relaunched in 2017, DXJR provided programming for the Lumad community. Under harassment from government supporters, the station ceased broadcasting in January 2019.

== History ==
This station was established in 2005 in Cagayan de Oro with a news and talk format. In February 2010, it was relaunched as Media Higala and adopted a TeleRadyo format, with its programs simulcast over TV-39. In 2012, it went off the air. In 2014, Rizal Memorial Colleges Broadcasting Corporation took over the station's operations and relaunched it as Radyo ni Juan Northern Mindanao. It relocated its operations to Brgy. Damilag, Manolo Fortich.

In September 2017, the Rural Missionaries of the Philippines-Northern Mindanao Region, Kalumbay Regional Lumad Organization and Kodao Productions took over the station's operations and rebranded it as Radyo Lumad, serving as the community station for the Lumad. It transferred its operations to Brgy. Dahilayan. It carried news and commentaries from the Radyo ni Juan network every morning, while carrying local programming for the rest of the day. In January 2019, Radyo Lumad went off the air due to threats and harassment from allies of the government.
