= Libertad, Misamis Oriental =

Municipality in Misamis Oriental, Philippines

Libertad
- Municipality
- Municipality of Libertad
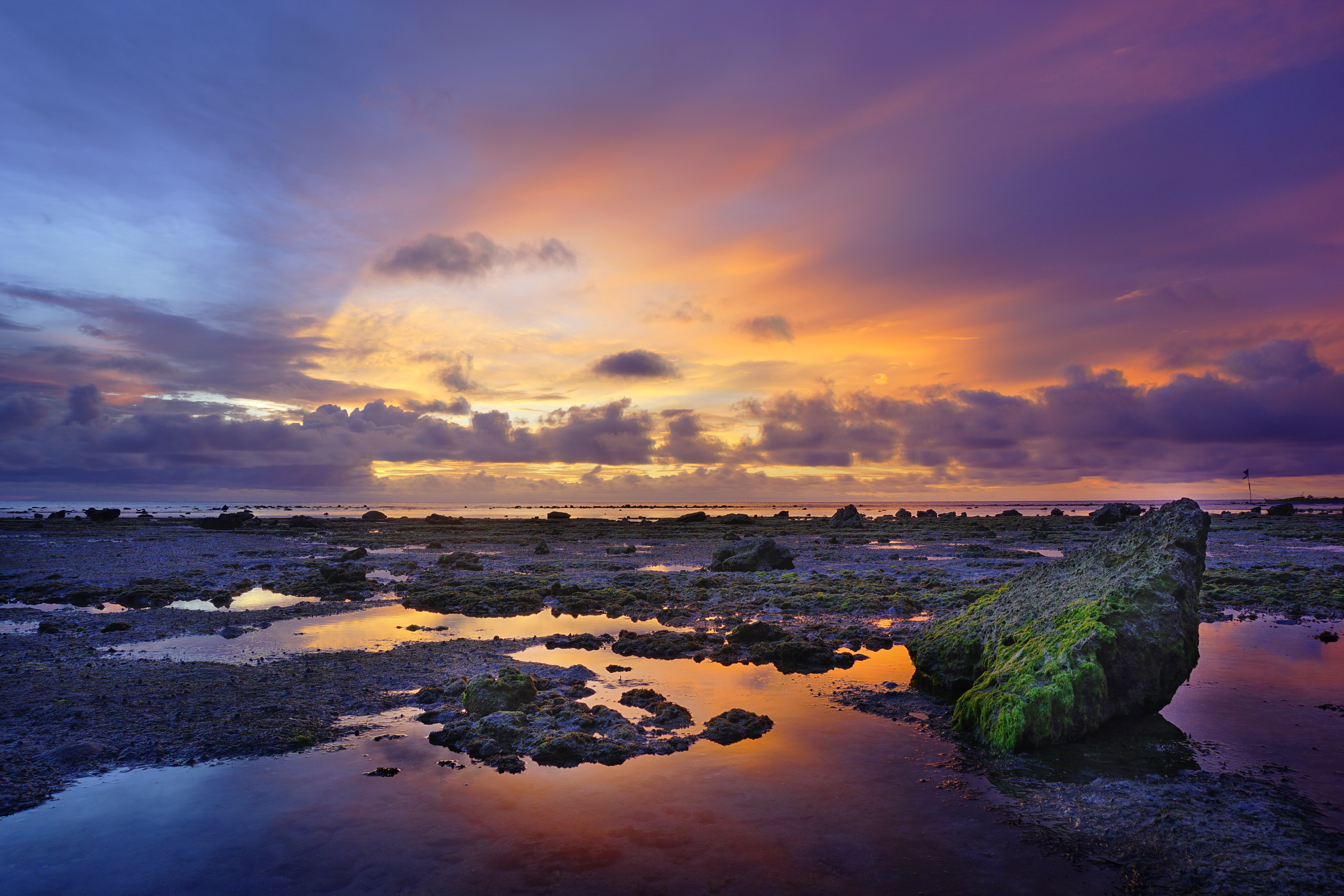
- Libertad Protected Area

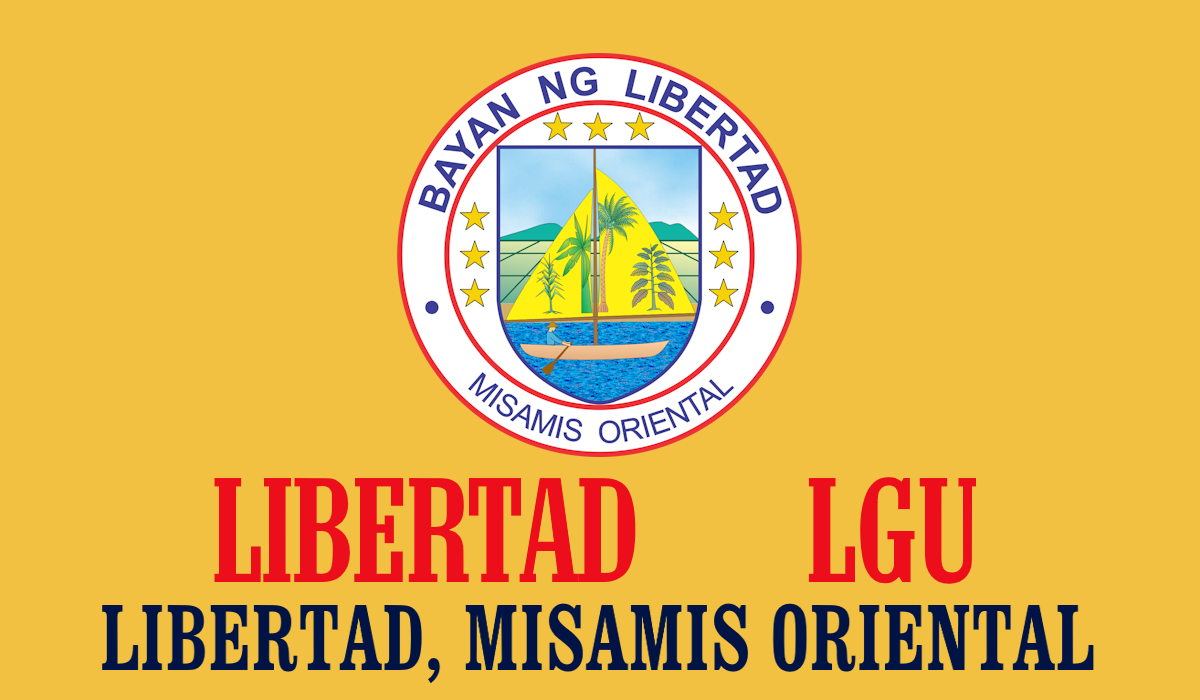
- Flag Seal

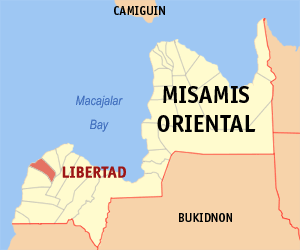
- Map of Misamis Oriental with Libertad highlighted
- Interactive map of Libertad
- Location within the Philippines
- Coordinates: 8°33′30″N 124°21′00″E
- Country: Philippines
- Region: Northern Mindanao
- Province: Misamis Oriental
- District: 2nd district
- Founded: June 21, 1963
- Barangays: 9 (see Barangays)

Government
  - Type: Sangguniang Bayan
  - Mayor: Leonardo L. Uy Jr.
  - Vice Mayor: Sharon M. Ballangan
  - Representative: Yevgeny Vicente B. Emano
  - Municipal Council: Members: Quirino J. Illana; Alex S. Namocot; Armando L. Cisneros; Roberto I. Gaid; Sharon M. Ballangan; Lilian U. Gallogo; Arnold N. Uy; Elmer G. Jagonal
  - Electorate: 11,180 voters (2025)

Area
  - Total: 22.47 km^{2} (8.68 sq mi)
- Elevation: 59 m (194 ft)
- Highest elevation: 439 m (1,440 ft)
- Lowest elevation: 0 m (0 ft)

Population (2024 census)
  - Total: 13,461
  - Density: 599.1/km^{2} (1,552/sq mi)
  - Households: 3,030

Economy
  - Income class: 4th municipal income class
  - Poverty incidence: 23.99% (2023)
  - Revenue: ₱ 102.8 million (2024)
  - Assets: ₱ 310.7 million (2024)
  - Expenditure: ₱ 86.8 million (2024)
  - Liabilities: ₱ 25.83 million (2024)

Service provider
  - Electricity: Misamis Oriental 1 Rural Electric Cooperative (MORESCO 1)
- Time zone: UTC+8 (PST)
- ZIP code: 9021
- PSGC: 1004315000
- IDD : area code: +63 (0)88
- Native languages: Cebuano; Binukid; Subanon; Tagalog
- Website: www.libertadmisor.gov.ph

Libertad, officially the Municipality of Libertad (Cebuano: Lungsod sa Libertad; Tagalog: Bayan ng Libertad), is a municipality in the province of Misamis Oriental, Philippines. According to the 2024 census, it has a population of 13,461 people.

Libertad is known for its Barungoy Festival and is also home to the Initao–Libertad Protected Landscape and Seascape which it shares with neighboring Initao municipality.

== Geography ==
=== Barangays ===
Libertad is politically subdivided into 9 barangays. Each barangay consists of puroks while some have sitios.

- Dulong
- Gimaylan
- Kimalok
- Lubluban
- Poblacion
- Retablo
- Santo Niño
- Tangkub
- Taytayan

=== Climate ===
Climate data for Libertad, Misamis Oriental
Month	Jan	Feb	Mar	Apr	May	Jun	Jul	Aug	Sep	Oct	Nov	Dec	Year
Mean daily maximum °C (°F)	28 (82)	29 (84)	30 (86)	31 (88)	30 (86)	30 (86)	30 (86)	30 (86)	30 (86)	30 (86)	29 (84)	29 (84)	30 (85)
Mean daily minimum °C (°F)	24 (75)	24 (75)	24 (75)	25 (77)	26 (79)	26 (79)	25 (77)	25 (77)	25 (77)	25 (77)	25 (77)	25 (77)	25 (77)
Average precipitation mm (inches)	271 (10.7)	217 (8.5)	193 (7.6)	178 (7.0)	344 (13.5)	423 (16.7)	362 (14.3)	358 (14.1)	329 (13.0)	320 (12.6)	322 (12.7)	260 (10.2)	3,577 (140.9)
Average rainy days	23.2	19.5	22.0	22.8	29.6	28.9	30.3	29.8	28.1	28.8	26.1	24.1	313.2
Source: Meteoblue

== Demographics ==
Population census of Libertad

Year	Pop.	±% p.a.
1970	6,523	—
1975	7,309	+2.31%
1980	7,770	+1.23%
1990	8,487	+0.89%
1995	9,258	+1.64%
2000	10,231	+2.17%

Year	Pop.	±% p.a.
2007	11,038	+1.05%
2010	11,586	+1.78%
2015	12,354	+1.23%
2020	12,948	+0.99%
2024	13,461	+0.94%

Source: Philippine Statistics Authority

In the 2024 census, the population of Libertad was 13,461 people, with a density of 600 inhabitants per square kilometre or 1,600 inhabitants per square mile.

== Economy ==
Poverty incidence of Libertad (%)

Source: Philippine Statistics Authority
