= DXCO-FM =

Radio station in Cagayan de Oro, Philippines

Heart FM Cagayan de Oro (DXCO)
Cagayan de Oro; Philippines
- Broadcast area: Misamis Oriental, parts of Lanao del Norte and Bukidnon
- Frequency: 92.7 MHz
- Branding: Heart FM 92.7

Programming
- Languages: Cebuano, Filipino
- Format: Soft adult contemporary, Talk

Ownership
- Owner: Cagayan de Oro Media Corporation
- Operator: Highland Broadcasting Network Corporation

History
- First air date: July 1, 2017
- Former names: Radyo ni Juan (2017–2020); Radyo Abante (2021–2022)
- Call sign meaning: Cagayan de Oro

Technical information
- Licensing authority: NTC
- Power: 5,000 watts
- Repeater: Bukidnon: DXIZ 93.7 MHz

DXCO (92.7 FM), on-air as Heart FM 92.7, is a radio station owned by Cagayan de Oro Media Corporation and operated by Highland Broadcasting Network Corporation. The station's studio is located at the 5th Floor, FICCO Admin Building, Vamenta Blvd., Brgy. Carmen, Cagayan de Oro, and its transmitter is located along Gumamela Ext., Brgy. Carmen, Cagayan de Oro.

== History ==
The station was established on July 1, 2017, under the Radyo ni Juan network. It was managed by Rizal Memorial Colleges Broadcasting Corporation, which also managed sister station DXJR. In August 2020, the station, along with most of Radyo ni Juan stations, went off the air due to financial problems.

On March 1, 2021, former Bukidnon 3rd District board member Gordon Torres, manager of Bukidnon-based 92.1 FM, took over the station's operations and relaunched it as Radyo Abante. It went off the air in March 2022. On February 14, 2023, management of Bukidnon-based DXIZ took over the station's operations and relaunched it as Heart FM.
