= Initao–Libertad Protected Landscape and Seascape =

Protected area in the Philippines

- IUCN category V (protected landscape/seascape)
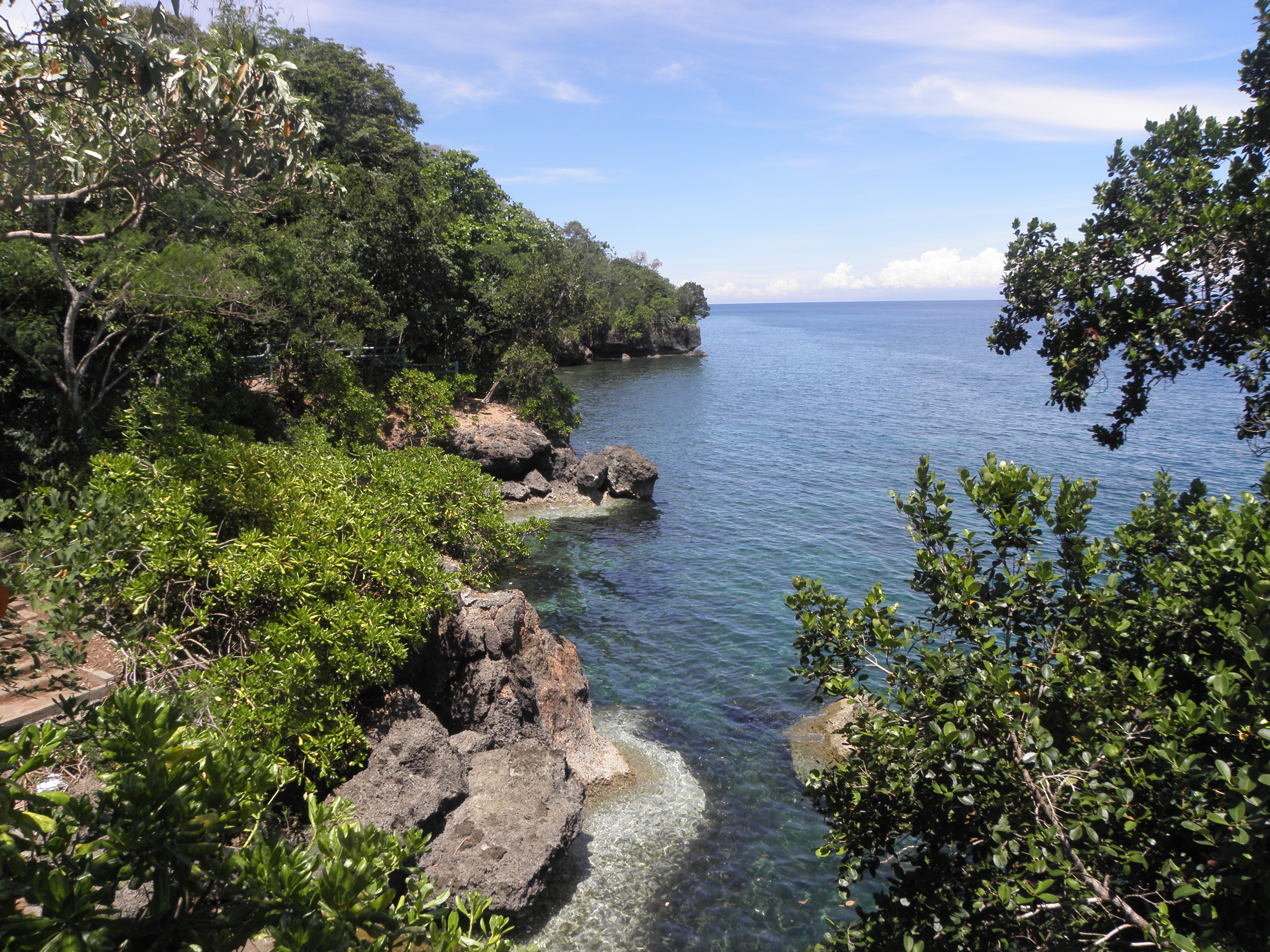
- View of the coast of the Initao–Libertad park

- Location within Philippines
- Location: Misamis Oriental, Philippines
- Nearest city: Cagayan de Oro
- Coordinates: 8°32′35″N 124°19′12″E
- Area: 1,300.78 hectares (3,214.3 acres)
- Established: September 16, 2002
- Governing body: Department of Environment and Natural Resources

The Initao–Libertad Protected Landscape and Seascape is a protected area in western Misamis Oriental, Philippines. At 1,300.78 hectares (3,214.3 acres), the park includes the limestone forests of the old Initao National Park, locally known as Lasang (Cebuano for "forest"), as well as their adjacent marine waters in the municipalities of Initao and Libertad. Established in 2002, it is home to the Lasang Secret Adventure Park, a theme park which is being promoted by the provincial government as an eco-tourism and corporate events destination. The park is 27 kilometres (17 mi) southwest of the Laguindingan Airport and 59 kilometres (37 mi) west of the provincial capital Cagayan de Oro.

== Description ==
The Initao–Libertad Park extends from the northern foothills of the Kitanglad Mountain Range to the northeastern entrance of Iligan Bay. It includes a buffer zone of 800.45 hectares (1,978.0 acres) and is located on the main highway of the Iligan–Cagayan–Butuan Road which divides this mossy virgin forest into two parts: the Initao portion in the barangay of Tubigan and the Libertad portion in the barangay of Gimaylan. The park also hosts at least 30 caves, with four currently accessible to visitors. It is also notable for its coral reefs and rugged coastline consisting of a series of cliffs interspersed with short sandy beaches.

=== Lasang Secret Adventure Park ===
The Lasang Secret Adventure Park is the focal point of the Initao–Libertad protected area. Developed by the Misamis Oriental Provincial Government in 2009, the PHP3 million eco-tourism site contains a 100-meter treetop boardwalk with an 80-foot spiral staircase, five hanging bridges, and a 120-meter zipline. It also contains an adventure trek providing access to the different caves and other areas around the coastal park. Campsites, picnic tables, barbecue pits, restrooms and open cottages with view decks are also provided. In 2011, the provincial government opened the Lasang Eco-Lodge and Day Spa for overnight visitors and corporate guests which offers conference rooms, a business center, day spa and guided tours by park rangers.

== Biodiversity ==
The park preserves the last remaining stand of old-growth forests in the province of Misamis Oriental. It is home to century-old trees consisting of talisay gubat (Elacocarpus monecera combretaccae) as well as molave, narra and teak, which serve as a habitat of some rare bird species such as the green imperial pigeon, native dove, emerald dove, serpent-eagle, Philippine megapode, Philippine sparrowhawk, Steere's pitta, Philippine hanging parrot and Little slaty flycatcher. Other species documented in the park include flying lemur, king spider, splitnose bat, monitor lizard, and rare priority species like the Philippine python, Philippine long-tailed macaque and the Philippine tarsier.

Finfish identified in the marine park include the Blacktipped sardine, striped sea catfish, flying fish, red squirrelfish, Australasian snapper, soldierfish, Papuan trevally, lapu-lapu, butterflyfish, wrasse, parrotfish, surgeonfish, Indian mackerel, triggerfish, tree-bar porcupinefish and flounder.
