= DXRS-FM =

Radyo Natin Gingoog (DXRS)
Gingoog; Philippines
- Broadcast area: Eastern Misamis Oriental
- Frequency: 105.7 MHz
- Branding: Radyo Natin 105.7

Programming
- Languages: Cebuano, Filipino
- Format: Community radio
- Network: Radyo Natin Network

Ownership
- Owner: MBC Media Group
- Operator: Goodluck Radio Network

History
- First air date: 1997

Technical information
- Licensing authority: NTC
- Power: 1,000 watts
- ERP: 5,000 watts

DXRS (105.7 FM), broadcasting as Radyo Natin 105.7, is a radio station owned by MBC Media Group and operated by Goodluck Radio Network. The station's studio and transmitter are located at Radyo Natin Bldg., Gundaya Ext, Brgy. 19, Gingoog.
