= DXIZ =

Heart FM Bukidnon (DXIZ)
- Maramag; Philippines
- Broadcast area: Bukidnon
- Frequency: 93.7 MHz
- Branding: Heart FM 93.7

Programming
- Languages: Cebuano, Filipino
- Format: Contemporary MOR, News, Talk

Ownership
- Owner: Highland Broadcasting Network

History
- Former names: Paglaum Radio (2021–2022)

Technical information
- Licensing authority: NTC
- Power: 5 kW

Heart FM 93.7 (DXIZ 93.7 MHz) is an FM station owned and operated by Highland Broadcasting Network. Its studios are located at the 2nd Floor, ZGas Bldg., Purok 6A, Brgy. South Poblacion, Maramag, and its transmitter is located at Brgy. Linabo, Quezon, Bukidnon. The frequency is formerly owned by Rizal Memorial Colleges Broadcasting Corporation.
