= Mindanao Post =

- Type: Weekly newspaper
- Format: Broadsheet
- Publisher: Elena Baron
- Editor-in-chief: Doming Rosal
- Founded: November 1999
- Language: English
- Headquarters: Davao City

The Mindanao Post is a newspaper has published and edited every Wednesday with general circulation in the whole Mindanao, with editorial and business address located at Blk. 16, Lot 3, SIR New Matina, Davao City.
