= DXMM-FM =

Radio station in Cagayan de Oro, Philippines

Brigada News FM Cagayan de Oro (DXMM)
- Cagayan de Oro; Philippines
- Broadcast area: Misamis Oriental, parts of Lanao del Norte and Bukidnon
- Frequency: 102.5 MHz
- Branding: 102.5 Brigada News FM

Programming
- Languages: Cebuano, Filipino
- Format: Contemporary MOR, News, Talk
- Network: Brigada News FM

Ownership
- Owner: Brigada Mass Media Corporation; (Baycomms Broadcasting Corporation)

History
- First air date: September 8, 2014

Technical information
- Licensing authority: NTC
- Power: 10,000 watts

Links
- Webcast: Live Stream
- Website: brigadanews.ph

DXMM (102.5 FM), broadcasting as 102.5 Brigada News FM, is a radio station owned and operated by Brigada Mass Media Corporation. The station's studio is located at Suan Arcade, Mastersons Ave., Ilaya Carmen, Cagayan de Oro, while its transmitter is located at the Zone 10, Upper Carmen, Cagayan de Oro.

Prior to the station's existence in 2014, Baycomms Broadcasting Corporation used to own 99.9 MHz under the call letters DXBD from February 24, 2003 to December 25, 2010.
