= DXWZ =

Radio station in Cagayan de Oro, Philippines

Wild FM CDO (DXWZ)
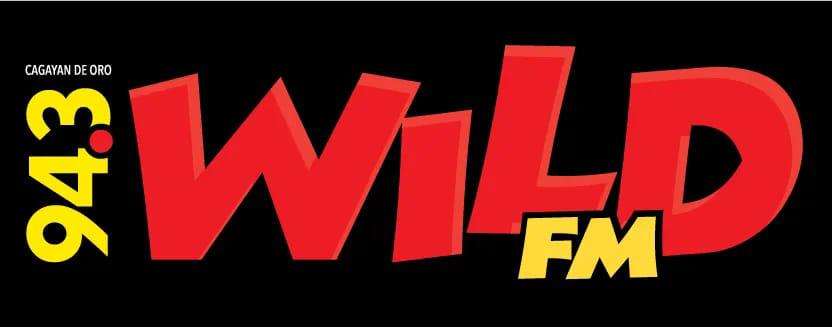
- Logo since 2023
- Cagayan de Oro; Philippines
- Broadcast area: Misamis Oriental, parts of Lanao del Norte and Bukidnon
- Frequency: 94.3 MHz
- Branding: 94.3 Wild FM

Programming
- Languages: Cebuano, Filipino, English
- Format: Contemporary MOR, Dance, OPM
- Network: Wild FM

Ownership
- Owner: UM Broadcasting Network

History
- First air date: 1965 (on AM); December 1991 (on FM)
- Former call signs: DXMO (1965-December 1991)
- Former names: Wild Zee
- Former frequencies: 950 kHz (1965–1978); 1260 kHz (1978–1991)
- Call sign meaning: Wild Zee (former branding)

Technical information
- Licensing authority: NTC
- Class: B C D
- Power: 10,000 watts
- ERP: 23,420 watts

Links
- Website: Official Facebook Website

Logo from 2018 to 2023 and again since 2023 as a secondary logo.

DXWZ (94.3 FM), broadcasting as 94.3 Wild FM, is a radio station owned and operated by UM Broadcasting Network. The station's studio and transmitter are located along Osmena Ext., Brgy. 26, Cagayan de Oro. It was formerly known as Wild Zee and also aired CCM as part of its programming.
