= DXLX =

Radio station in Cagayan de Oro, Philippines

Barangay LS Cagayan de Oro (DXLX)
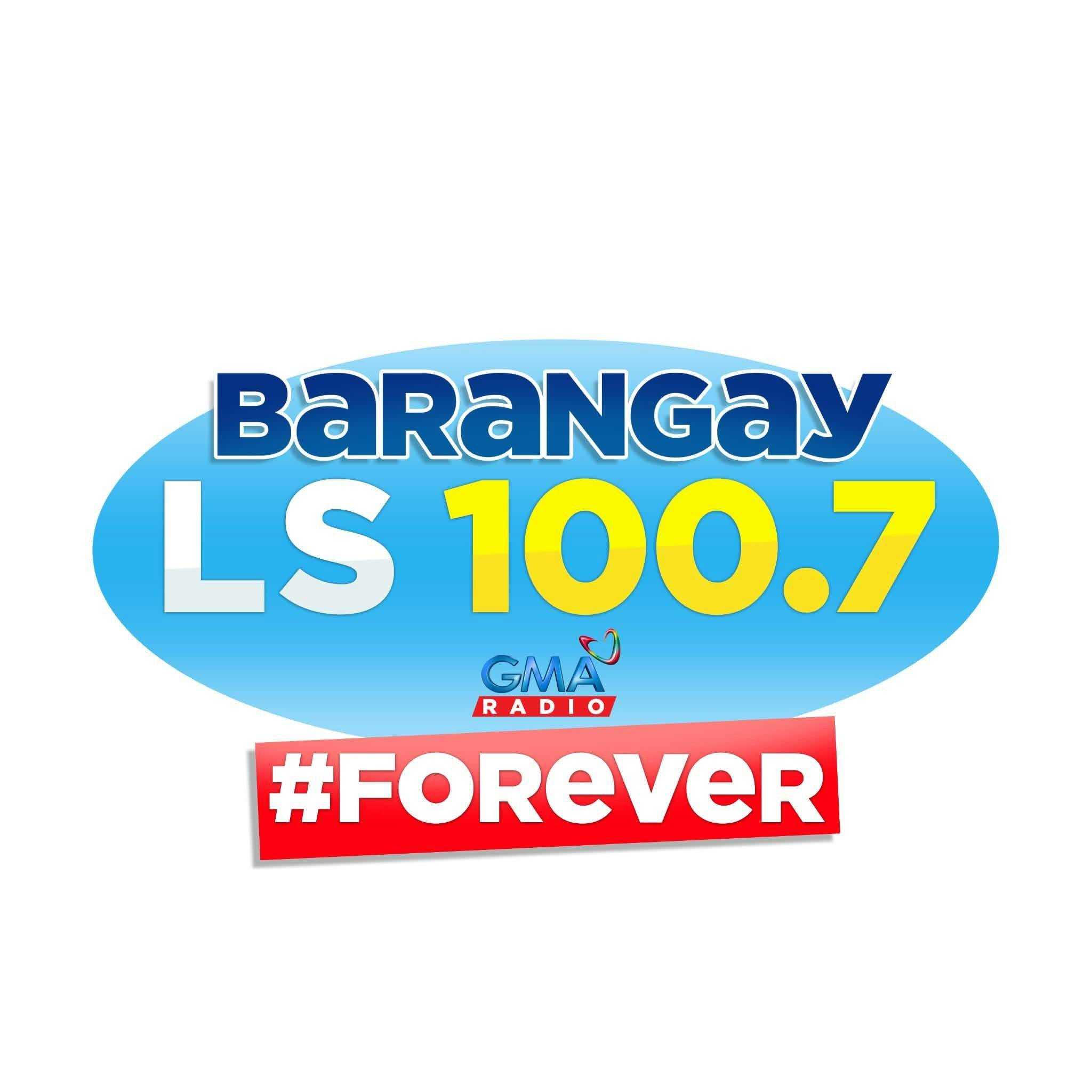
- Cagayan de Oro; Philippines
- Broadcast area: Misamis Oriental and surrounding areas
- Frequency: 100.7 MHz
- Branding: Barangay LS 100.7

Programming
- Languages: Cebuano, Filipino
- Format: Contemporary MOR, OPM
- Network: Barangay LS

Ownership
- Owner: GMA Network Inc.
- Sister stations: GMA TV-35 Cagayan de Oro; GMA DTV-47 Cagayan de Oro

History
- First air date: 1981
- Former names: LX 100.7 (1981-April 29, 1992); Campus Radio (1995–2002, 2005-2014); Wow FM (2002-2005)
- Call sign meaning: Roman numeral of 60

Technical information
- Licensing authority: NTC
- Power: 5,000 watts
- ERP: 15,000 watts

Links
- Website: www.gmanetwork.com

DXLX (100.7 FM), broadcasting as Barangay LS 100.7, is a radio station owned and operated by GMA Network Inc. The station's studio and offices are located at the 2/F Centro Mariano Bldg., Sergio Osmeña St., Brgy. 31, Cagayan de Oro, while its transmitter is located at GMA Transmitter Site, Malasag Heights, Brgy. Cugman, Cagayan de Oro.

== History ==
=== 1981-1992: LX 100.7 ===
Launched in 1981 as LX 100.7: The Romantic Touch, the station was the second FM outlet in the Romantic Touch network, owned by Republic Broadcasting System. The network's first station, DYRT in Cebu, had begun broadcasting under the same branding on February 4, 1980. LX 100.7 featured an easy listening format in English but ceased operations on April 29, 1992.

=== 1995-2014: Campus Radio ===
On March 1, 1995, after three years off the air, the station returned as Campus Radio 100.7 with the slogan “Forever”. This coincided with Mike Enriquez taking over GMA's radio operations under the RGMA Network on the same day. The station simultaneously switched to a mass-based format. In 1998, following the establishment of GMA Cagayan de Oro, it adopted the local slogans “Patsadaha Uy!” and “Nindota Ah!”— similar to its sister station in Cebu. On July 29, 2002, it was rebranded as Wow FM, but reverted to Campus Radio a few years later.

=== 2014-present: Barangay ===
Barangay FM 100.7 logo from 2023 to 2026

On February 17, 2014, as part of RGMA's brand unification, the station rebranded as Barangay 100.7, adopting the slogan “Isang Bansa, Isang Barangay.” Following the launch, it began simulcasting several programs from its flagship station in Metro Manila. In 2020, Barangay FM revived the “Forever” slogan while retaining the older “Nindota Ah!” for local use.

On April 5, 2026, the station adapted the Barangay LS branding from its flagship station.
