= DXHY =

Radio station in Cagayan de Oro, Philippines

Radyo Natin CDO (DXHY)
- Cagayan de Oro; Philippines
- Broadcast area: Misamis Oriental, parts of Lanao del Norte and Bukidnon
- Frequency: 106.3 MHz
- Branding: Radyo Natin 106.3

Programming
- Languages: Cebuano, Filipino
- Format: Community Radio
- Network: Radyo Natin Network

Ownership
- Owner: MBC Media Group; (Cebu Broadcasting Company)
- Sister stations: 96.9 Easy Rock, 104.7 Yes FM, DZRH CDO

History
- First air date: 2007
- Call sign meaning: Hayahay

Technical information
- Licensing authority: NTC
- Class: B C D
- Power: 10,000 watts

Links
- Website: Facebook page

DXHY (106.3 FM), broadcasting as Radyo Natin 106.3, is a radio station owned and operated by MBC Media Group through its licensee Cebu Broadcasting Company. Its studios and transmitter are located along 9-14th Sts. Brgy. Nazareth, Cagayan de Oro. It is one of the few Radyo Natin stations in major markets.
