= DXIM =

Radio station in Cagayan de Oro, Philippines

Radyo Pilipinas Cagayan de Oro (DXIM)
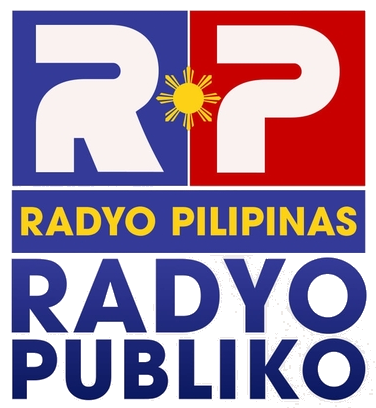
- Cagayan de Oro; Philippines
- Broadcast area: Misamis Oriental and surrounding areas
- Frequency: 936 kHz
- Branding: Radyo Pilipinas

Programming
- Languages: Cebuano, Filipino
- Format: News, Public Affairs, Talk, Government Radio

Ownership
- Owner: Presidential Broadcast Service

History
- First air date: 1974
- Former frequencies: 930 kHz (1974–1978)
- Call sign meaning: Imelda Marcos

Technical information
- Licensing authority: NTC
- Power: 1,000 watts
- Repeater: 87.9 MHz

DXIM (936 AM) Radyo Pilipinas is a radio station owned and operated by the Presidential Broadcast Service. The station's studio and transmitter are located at Don Apolinar Velez, Brgy. Carmen, Cagayan de Oro.
