= Gold Radio (Cagayan de Oro) =

Radio station in Cagayan de Oro, Philippines

Gold Radio Cagayan de Oro
- Cagayan de Oro; Philippines
- Broadcast area: Misamis Oriental and surrounding areas
- Frequency: 103.9 MHz
- Branding: G103.9 Gold Radio

Programming
- Languages: Cebuano, Filipino
- Format: News, Public Affairs, Talk

Ownership
- Owner: Ultracraft Broadcasting Corporation

History
- First air date: July 31, 2025
- Former call signs: DXRU (2012–2025)
- Former names: Radio Ultra (2012–2025)
- Former frequencies: 1188 kHz (2012–2025)

Technical information
- Licensing authority: NTC
- Power: 15,000 watts

G103.9 Gold Radio (103.9 FM) is a radio station owned and operated by Ultracraft Broadcasting Corporation. The station's studio and transmitter is located at Suan Arcade, Masterson Ave., Brgy. Carmen, Cagayan de Oro.

== History ==
DXRU first went on air on March 16, 2012 on 1188 kHz. Prior to Hypersonic Broadcasting Center's acquisition, the frequency was formerly used by DXIF from December 30, 1987, to April 22, 2011, when it transferred to 729 kHz. On July 31, 2025, the station moved to the 103.9 MHz FM band and adopted the new name G103.9 Gold Radio.

== Controversies ==
This station was reported to a DZMM program Kabayan on Sep, 2015 when 2 (technically 3) of it’s reporters got fired, because the staff and reporters ate a lechon with a note saying “To Radio Ultra” by the son of then city mayor, Oscar Moreno. The lechon was originally meant to be brought to the owner’s house, Girlie Gualberto-Suan, for a dinner, but the technician panicked and said “Naubos na namin.”, so the reporters and staff raised money and bought another lechon. Later, in March, 2016, the station lost the case.
