= DXKO-AM =

Radio station in Cagayan de Oro, Philippines

Radyo Ronda Cagayan de Oro (DXKO)
- Cagayan de Oro; Philippines
- Broadcast area: Misamis Oriental and surrounding areas
- Frequency: 1368 kHz
- Branding: RPN DXKO Radyo Ronda

Programming
- Languages: Cebuano, Filipino
- Format: News, Public Affairs, Talk, Drama
- Network: Radyo Ronda

Ownership
- Owner: Radio Philippines Network
- Sister stations: DXKO-TV (RPTV)

History
- First air date: 1969
- Former frequencies: 1350 kHz (1969–1978)

Technical information
- Licensing authority: NTC
- Power: 10,000 watts

Links
- Website: https://rpnradio.com/dxko-cdo

RPN DXKO Radyo Ronda
- Country: Philippines
- Broadcast area: Service Coverage Areas of Parasat Cable TV

Programming
- Languages: Cebuano, Filipino
- Picture format: 16:9 480i SDTV

Ownership
- Owner: Radio Philippines Network

Links
- Website: rpnradio.com/dxko-cdo

DXKO (1368 AM) Radyo Ronda is a radio station owned and operated by the Radio Philippines Network. The station's studio is located along C.M. Recto Ave., Brgy. Gusa, Cagayan de Oro, and its transmitter is located at PHIVIDEC, Brgy. Casinglot, Tagoloan, Misamis Oriental.
