= DXJL =

Radio station in Cagayan de Oro, Philippines

The New J (DXJL)
- Cagayan de Oro; Philippines
- Broadcast area: Misamis Oriental, parts of Lanao del Norte and Bukidnon
- Frequency: 103.3 MHz
- Branding: The New J 103.3

Programming
- Language: English
- Format: Christian radio

Ownership
- Owner: Sarraga Integrated and Management Corporation
- Operator: Far East Broadcasting Company

History
- First air date: 2006
- Call sign meaning: Jesus, our Lord

Technical information
- Licensing authority: NTC
- Power: 2,500 watts
- ERP: 7,500 watts

Links
- Website: http://thenewjradio.febc.ph/

DXJL (103.3 FM), broadcasting as The New J 103.3, is a radio station owned by Sarraga Integrated and Management Corporation (SIAM) and operated by the Far East Broadcasting Company. The station's studio and transmitter are located at Unit 210, 2nd Floor, CKY Center, Capistrano-T.Chaves Sts., Cagayan de Oro. It is the first & only Christian FM Station in the city.

== History ==
The New J was launched in 2006. It formerly broadcast from 199 J.R. Borja St.

On July 1, 2016, FEBC took over the station's operations.

In 2019, The New J relocated to its current home in CKY Center.
