= DXKI-FM =

Radio station in Cagayan de Oro, Philippines

Strong Radio (DXKI)
- Cagayan de Oro; Philippines
- Broadcast area: Misamis Oriental, Northern Bukidnon and surrounding areas
- Frequency: 90.3 MHz
- Branding: 90.3 Strong Radio

Programming
- Languages: Cebuano, Filipino
- Format: Classic hits, News, Talk

Ownership
- Owner: DCG Radio-TV Network; (Katigbak Enterprises, Inc.)
- Operator: Saturn Media Advertisement and Digital Marketing Corporation

History
- First air date: December 30, 1992 (under Bombo Radyo); August 26, 2019 (under Saturn Media)
- Former call signs: DXEQ (1992–2010)
- Call sign meaning: Kiss

Technical information
- Licensing authority: NTC
- Power: 10,000 watts

DXKI (90.3 FM), on-air as 90.3 Strong Radio, is a radio station owned by DCG Radio-TV Network and operated by Saturn Media Advertisement and Digital Marketing Corporation. The station's studio is located along Max Suniel St., Brgy. Carmen, Cagayan de Oro, and its transmitter is located at Upper Sumpong, Brgy. Indahag, Cagayan de Oro.

It was formerly known as 90.3 EQ and Star FM under Bombo Radyo Philippines through its now-defunct licensee Consolidated Broadcasting System from 1992 to circa 2010, when it went off the air.
