= DXQR =

Radio station in Cagayan de Oro, Philippines

Home Radio CDO (DXQR)
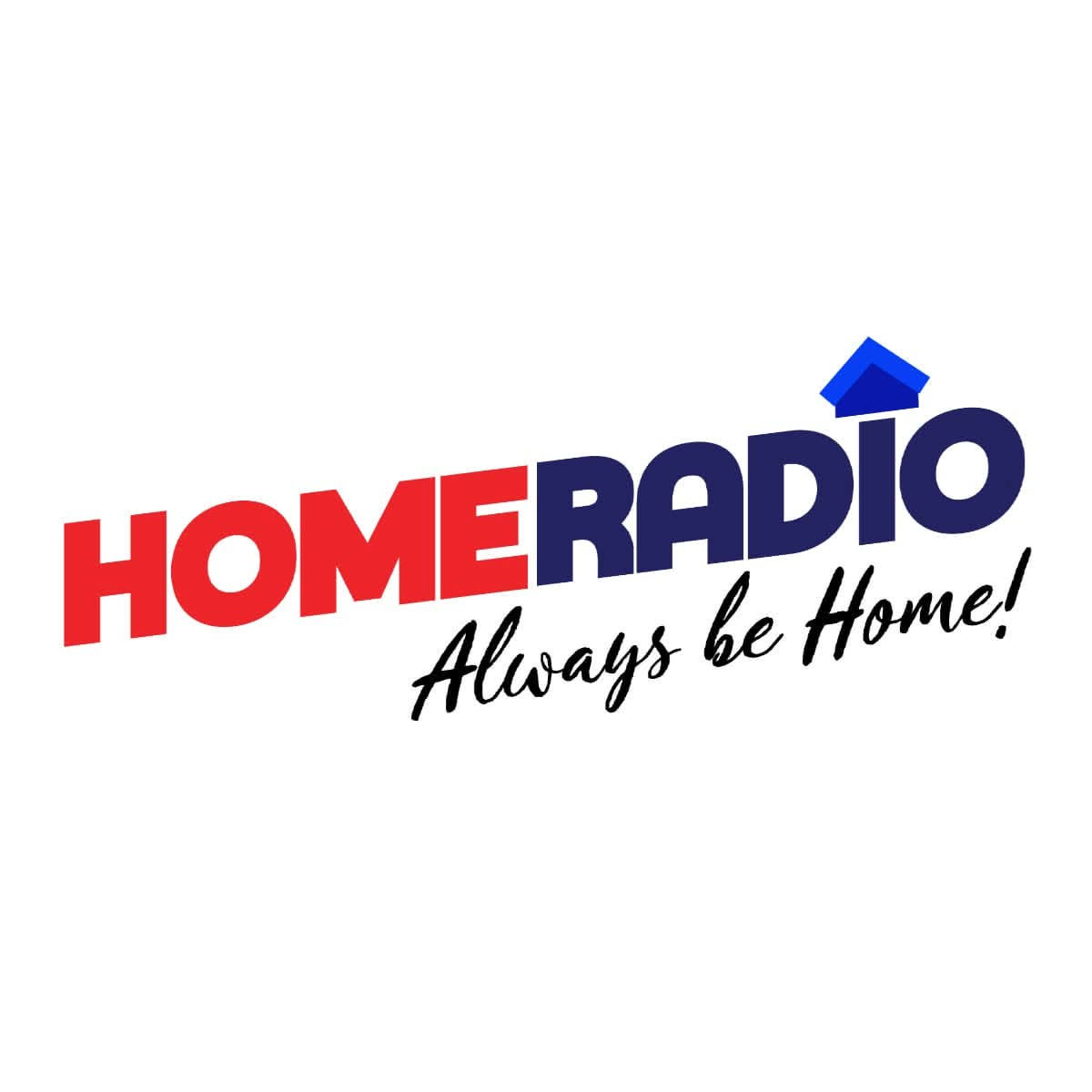
- Cagayan de Oro; Philippines
- Broadcast area: Misamis Oriental, parts of Lanao del Norte and Bukidnon
- Frequency: 93.5 MHz
- Branding: 93.5 Home Radio

Programming
- Language: English
- Format: Soft adult contemporary
- Network: Home Radio

Ownership
- Owner: Aliw Broadcasting Corporation

History
- First air date: December 22, 1997
- Former names: Q93 (1997-2000); DWIZ (2023–26)

Technical information
- Licensing authority: NTC
- Power: 10,000 watts
- ERP: 20,000 watts

DXQR (93.5 FM), broadcasting as 93.5 Home Radio, is a radio station owned and operated by Aliw Broadcasting Corporation. Its studio and transmitter are located along Don Apolinar Velez St. cor. Hayes St., Cagayan de Oro.

== History ==
Home Radio CDO logo from July 2017 to January 2023.

The station first went on air on December 22, 1997 as Q93. In 1999, it became part of the Home Radio network. On January 16, 2023, it dropped the Home branding. On January 30, 2023, after two weeks of music automation, it was relaunched under the DWIZ network. On April 30, 2026, DWIZ News FM made its final broadcast. On May 8, after a week of music automation, it was relaunched under the Home Radio network.
