= DXIF =

Radio station in Cagayan de Oro, Philippines

Bombo Radyo Cagayan de Oro (DXIF)
- Cagayan de Oro; Philippines
- Broadcast area: Misamis Oriental and surrounding areas
- Frequency: 729 kHz
- Branding: DXIF Bombo Radyo

Programming
- Languages: Cebuano, Filipino
- Format: News, Public Affairs, Talk, Drama
- Network: Bombo Radyo

Ownership
- Owner: Bombo Radyo Philippines; (Newsounds Broadcasting Network, Inc.)

History
- First air date: December 30, 1987
- Former call signs: DXOR (1970–2005)
- Former frequencies: 1188 kHz (1987–2011)
- Call sign meaning: Imelda Florete

Technical information
- Licensing authority: NTC
- Power: 10,000 watts

Links
- Webcast: Listen Live
- Website: Bombo Radyo Cagayan de Oro

DXIF (729 AM) Bombo Radyo is a radio station owned and operated by Bombo Radyo Philippines through its licensee Newsounds Broadcasting Network. Its studio is located at Bombo Radyo Broadcast Center, Ballos Bldg., Door no. 7, Corrales Ext. corner Baculio St., Cagayan de Oro, and its transmitter is located at Brgy. Taboc, Opol.

It was formerly situated on 1188 kHz from its inception on December 30, 1987 to April 22, 2011. It went back on air on its current frequency a couple of days later. Meanwhile, DXRU was launched on the former's old frequency. Its current frequency was originally owned by P.N. Roa Broadcasting System under the call letters DXOR from 1970 to 2005.
