= DXYR =

Radio station in Cagayan de Oro, Philippines

Yes FM CDO (DXYR)
- Cagayan de Oro; Philippines
- Broadcast area: Misamis Oriental, parts of Lanao del Norte and Bukidnon
- Frequency: 104.7 MHz
- Branding: 104.7 Yes FM

Programming
- Languages: Cebuano, Filipino
- Format: Contemporary MOR, OPM
- Network: Yes FM

Ownership
- Owner: MBC Media Group; (Philippine Broadcasting Corporation)
- Sister stations: 96.9 Easy Rock, 106.3 Radyo Natin, DZRH CDO

History
- First air date: 1999
- Former call signs: DXTR
- Call sign meaning: Yes Radio

Technical information
- Licensing authority: NTC
- Power: 10 kW
- ERP: 30 kW

Links
- Website: www.yesthebest.com.ph/cagayan-de-oro

104.7 Yes FM (DXYR 104.7 MHz) is an FM station owned and operated by MBC Media Group through its licensee Philippine Broadcasting Corporation. Its studios and transmitter are located at 6th Floor, Imperial Appliance Plaza Bldg., Velez St., Cagayan de Oro.
