= Initao =

Municipality in Misamis Oriental, Philippines

- Municipality
- Municipality of Initao
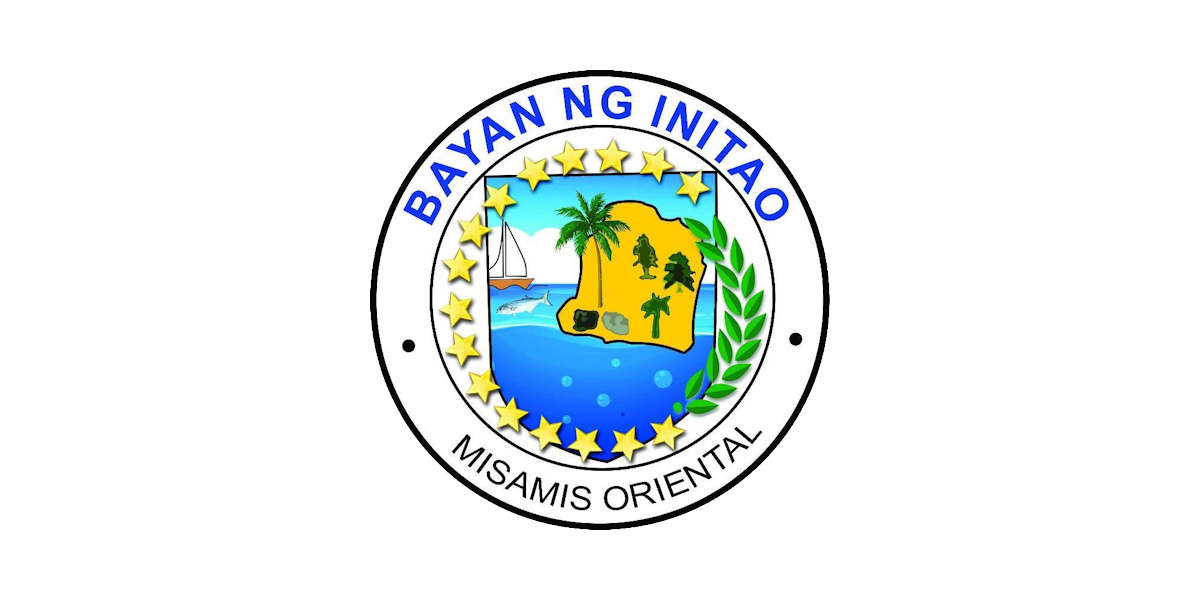
- Flag

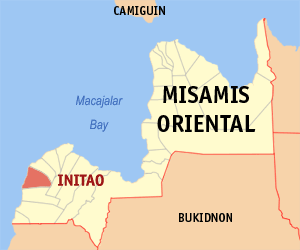
- Map of Misamis Oriental with Initao highlighted
- Interactive map of Initao
- Location within the Philippines
- Coordinates: 8°30′00″N 124°19′00″E
- Country: Philippines
- Region: Northern Mindanao
- Province: Misamis Oriental
- District: 2nd district
- Barangays: 16 (see Barangays)

Government
  - Type: Sangguniang Bayan
  - Mayor: Mercy Grace J. Acain
  - Vice Mayor: Enerito J. Acain V
  - Representative: Yevgeny Vincente B. Emano
  - Municipal Council: Members: Louie Jay Ban Jarales; Richard Magno; Cora Sayre; Richard Go; Ariel Galaroza; Agustin Caberte; Hernan Carbonilla; Victoria Galarroza
  - Electorate: 22,655 voters (2022 general election)

Area
  - Total: 111.27 km^{2} (42.96 sq mi)
- Elevation: 51 m (167 ft)
- Highest elevation: 409 m (1,342 ft)
- Lowest elevation: 0 m (0 ft)

Population (2024 census)
  - Total: 34,445
  - Density: 309.56/km^{2} (801.76/sq mi)
  - Households: 8,756

Economy
  - Income class: 1st municipal income class
  - Poverty incidence: 24.91% (2023)
  - Revenue: ₱ 275.9 million (2024)
  - Assets: ₱ 1,535 million (2024)
  - Expenditure: ₱ 239.1 million (2024)
  - Liabilities: ₱ 285.3 million (2024)

Service provider
  - Electricity: Misamis Oriental 1 Rural Electric Cooperative (MORESCO 1)
- Time zone: UTC+8 (PST)
- ZIP code: 9022
- PSGC: 1004310000
- IDD : area code: +63 (0)88
- Native languages: Cebuano; Binukid; Subanon; Tagalog
- Website: none

Initao, officially the Municipality of Initao (Cebuano: Lungsod sa Initao; Tagalog: Bayan ng Initao), is a 1st class municipality in the province of Misamis Oriental, Philippines based on the new reclassification of Department of Finance DOF-DO-074.2024 (Annex A Page 27). According to the 2024 census, it has a population of 34,445 people.

It is seated about 39 kilometres (24 mi) west of the provincial capital of Cagayan de Oro, 29 kilometres (18 mi) east of Iligan City, and about 767 kilometres (477 mi) south-south-east of Philippine capital, Manila. The nearest primary road network is the Butuan–Cagayan de Oro–Iligan Road. The nearest airport is Laguindingan International Airport located 39 minutes away towards Cagayan de Oro.

HazardHunterPh app assessment on seismic hazard marks the town safe from ground rupture, prone to ground shaking and generally susceptible to liquefaction. Volcanic Hazard assessment mainly identifies it as having no immediate volcanic hazard threat base on its location to the nearest active volcano. However, it has high susceptibility to flooding at 1 to 2 meters flood height and lasting for more than 3 days.

Economic activity in the area is mainly dependent on fishing, agriculture, retail, tourism and government services such as The Misamis Oriental Provincial Hospital-Initao, Regional Trial Court Branch 44, Initao-Libertad 8th Municipal Circuit Trial Court, Initao College, the BJMP, DENR, DepEd etc. According to the Bureau of Local Government Finance, the annual regular revenue of Initao for the fiscal year of 2022 was ₱225,963,427.43 and for the first quarter of the fiscal year 2024, Initao has total fund/cash available amounting to ₱200,255,983.98 with ₱11,494,867.01 total payments of prior year/s accounts payable and ₱5,823,799.61 total continuing appropriation which results to ₱182,937,317.36 total fund/cash balance based on the Statement of Receipts and Expenditures (SRE) by LGU for the fiscal year of 2024 Q1.

Tourism sites include the Initao-Libertad Protected Landscape and Seascape which locals simply call "lasang" or forest in the local dialect, various beaches dotting its shorelines and recent additions of agritourism sites developed by locals.

Significant town celebrations include the town fiesta celebrated by Roman Catholics in honor of the Patron Saint Francis Xavier which is held every December 2 and 3 although the celebration stretches for a week. Various festivals promoting tourism are also being spearheaded by the LGU and the Provincial Government of Misamis Oriental.

== History ==
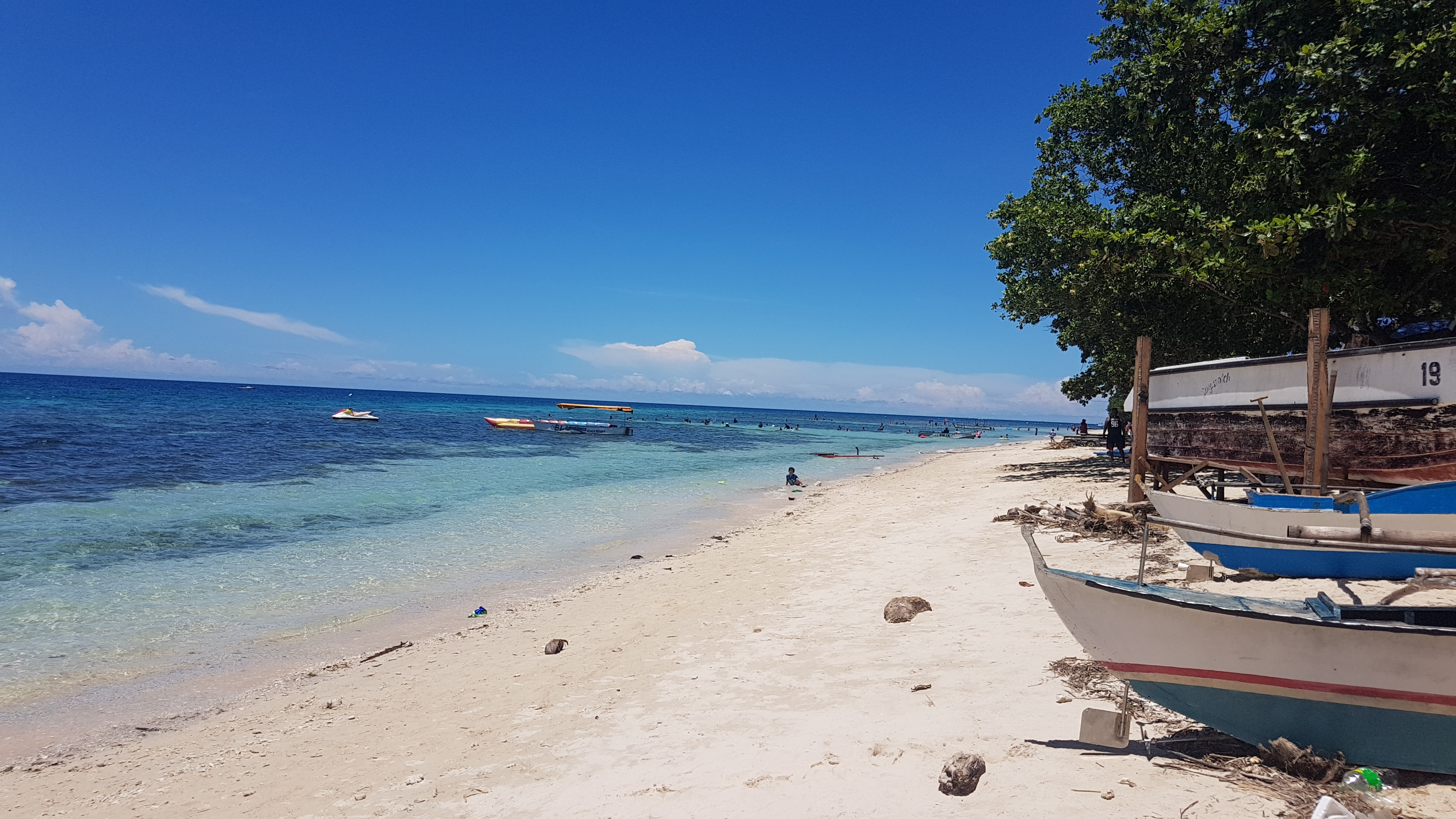
White sand beach at Initao

Based on the research report submitted by L.M. Neri, A.M.M. Ragrario, E.C.R. Robles, and A.J. Carlos, the original settlers of Initao were the Bukidnons. They were described as warlike and aggressive and ready to sacrifice their lives in defending their territory. It is said that the early community in Initao was ruled by three (3) brothers named Datu Hukom, Datu Tamparong, and Datu Pulagoyan, who had to protect early settlers in Initao against Moro invasions in the sixteenth century.

Because of the frequent threat by the Moro pirates, the people of Initao became war-like. They were considered to be hot-blooded or hot-tempered, fearless fighters. Hence, the word Initao comes from the word init which means “hot” and tao which means “people.” They were people perpetually prepared to fight their enemy to defend their territory and community. Legend also has it that the Moro raiders were defeated, the people planted bamboo along the Initao River as a symbol of peace and truce among them.

The word Initao, originally spelled by the Spaniards as Ynitao, was mentioned on August 6, 1838, in the inventory of livestock, fruits, exotic and cereal plants in the Provincia de Misamis (Ereccion de Pueblos, Misamis 1808–1839). In May 1858, Ynitao was headed by Gobernadorcillo Francisco Antonio and succeeded by Gobernadorcillo Abariano Caburratan in 1894.

In 1838, Initao was a Spanish pueblo composed of 3 cabecerias (Ereccion de Pueblos, Misamis 1808–1839). On October 27, 1877, Ynitao had 7 cabecerias which became 8 on June 30, 1882. It was decreased to 1 cabeceria, known as Apas, on June 30, 1883, until 1884 with a total population of 1,514. On June 30, 1887, Ynitao again increased its number of cabeceria to 19 and decreased to 12 on October 3, 1892.

In 1896–1902, Ynitao was in the province of Lanao. In 1903, Initao once again became a pueblo. The municipality is one of the oldest in the western part of Misamis Oriental.

Initao, which became part of the then-undivided Misamis, reduced its territory following the establishment of Moro Province in 1903 through Act No. 787.

In 1957, the barrio of Naawan, then part of Initao, was constituted into the town of Naawan.

Moreover, the municipalities of Manticao and Lugait were once part of Initao until 1948.

== Geography ==
=== Barangays ===
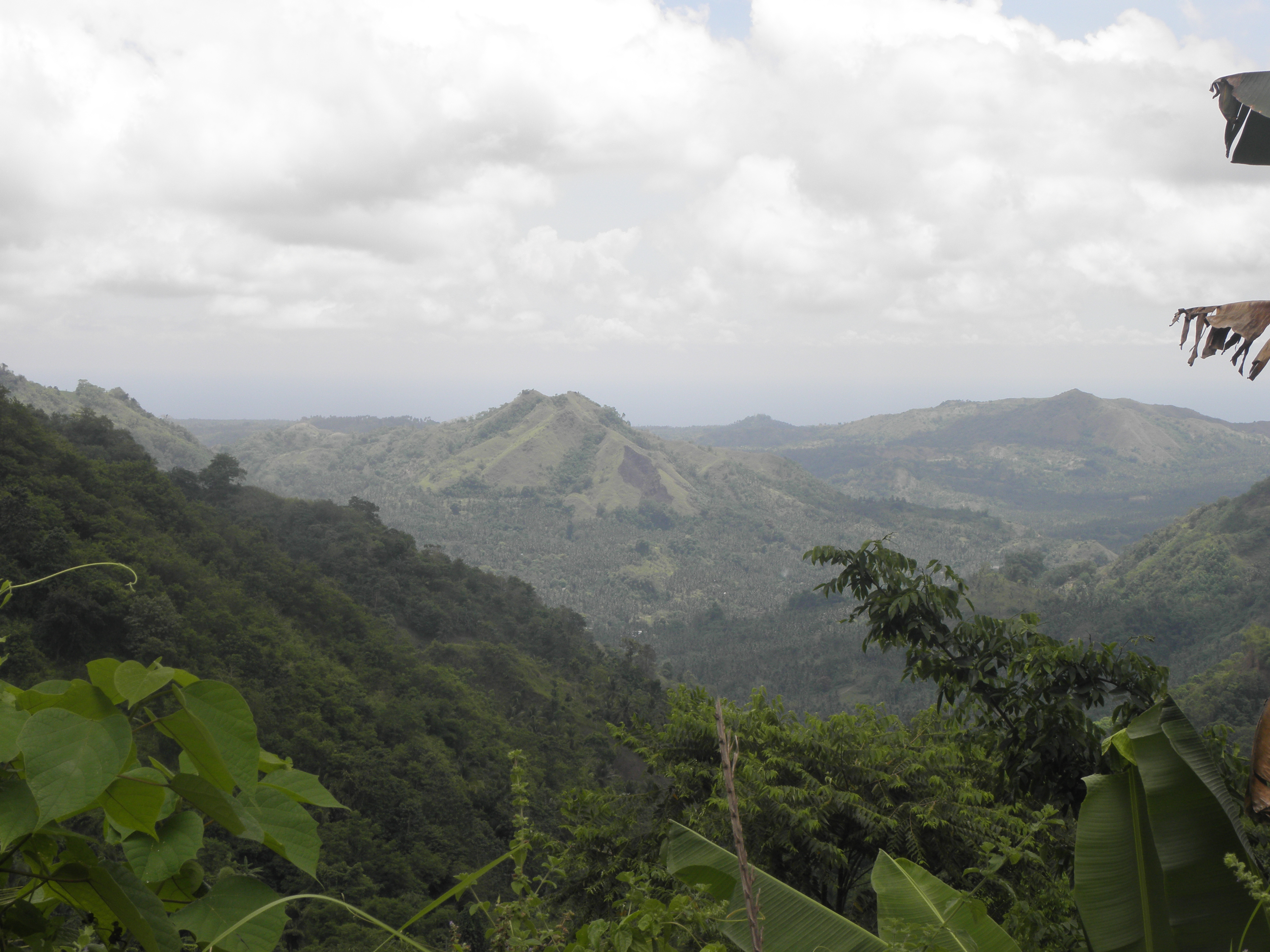
Rural area

Initao is politically subdivided into 16 barangays. Each barangay consists of puroks while some have sitios.

- Aluna
- Andales
- Apas
- Calacapan
- Gimangpang
- Jampason
- Kamelon
- Kanitoan
- Oguis
- Pagahan
- Poblacion
- Pontacon
- San Pedro
- Sinalac
- Tawantawan
- Tubigan

=== Climate ===
Climate data for Initao, Misamis Oriental
Month	Jan	Feb	Mar	Apr	May	Jun	Jul	Aug	Sep	Oct	Nov	Dec	Year
Mean daily maximum °C (°F)	28 (82)	29 (84)	30 (86)	31 (88)	30 (86)	30 (86)	30 (86)	30 (86)	30 (86)	30 (86)	29 (84)	29 (84)	30 (85)
Mean daily minimum °C (°F)	24 (75)	24 (75)	24 (75)	25 (77)	26 (79)	26 (79)	25 (77)	25 (77)	25 (77)	25 (77)	25 (77)	25 (77)	25 (77)
Average precipitation mm (inches)	271 (10.7)	217 (8.5)	193 (7.6)	178 (7.0)	344 (13.5)	423 (16.7)	362 (14.3)	358 (14.1)	329 (13.0)	320 (12.6)	322 (12.7)	260 (10.2)	3,577 (140.9)
Average rainy days	23.2	19.5	22.0	22.8	29.6	28.9	30.3	29.8	28.1	28.8	26.1	24.1	313.2
Source: Meteoblue

== Demographics ==
Population census of Initao

Year	Pop.	±% p.a.
1903	4,374	—
1918	7,371	+3.54%
1939	19,576	+4.76%
1948	39,462	+8.10%
1960	17,272	−6.65%
1970	16,904	−0.21%
1975	18,906	+2.27%
1980	21,842	+2.93%

Year	Pop.	±% p.a.
1990	23,113	+0.57%
1995	23,340	+0.18%
2000	27,035	+3.20%
2007	29,624	+1.27%
2010	29,331	−0.36%
2015	32,370	+1.90%
2020	33,902	+0.98%
2024	34,445	+0.38%

Source: Philippine Statistics Authority

In the 2024 census, the population of Initao was 34,445 people, with a density of 310 inhabitants per square kilometre or 800 inhabitants per square mile.

== Economy ==
Poverty incidence of Initao (%)

Source: Philippine Statistics Authority

== Tourism ==
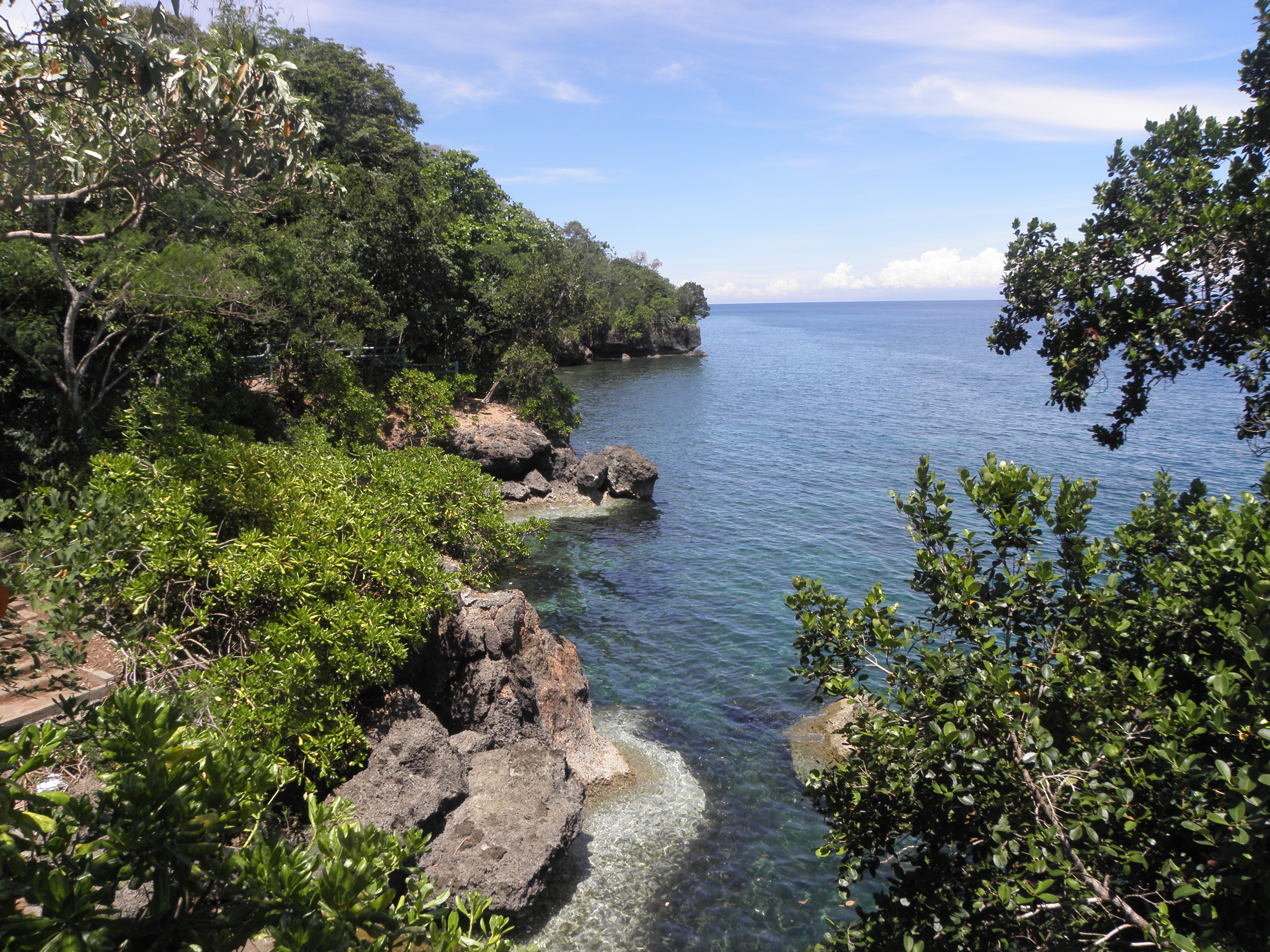
Lasang

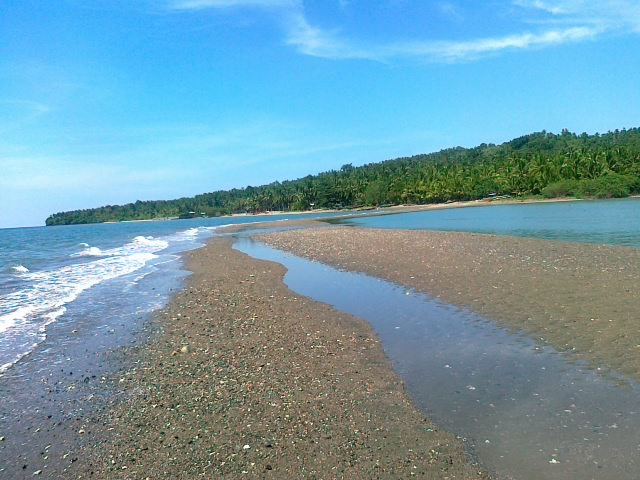
Initao Beach

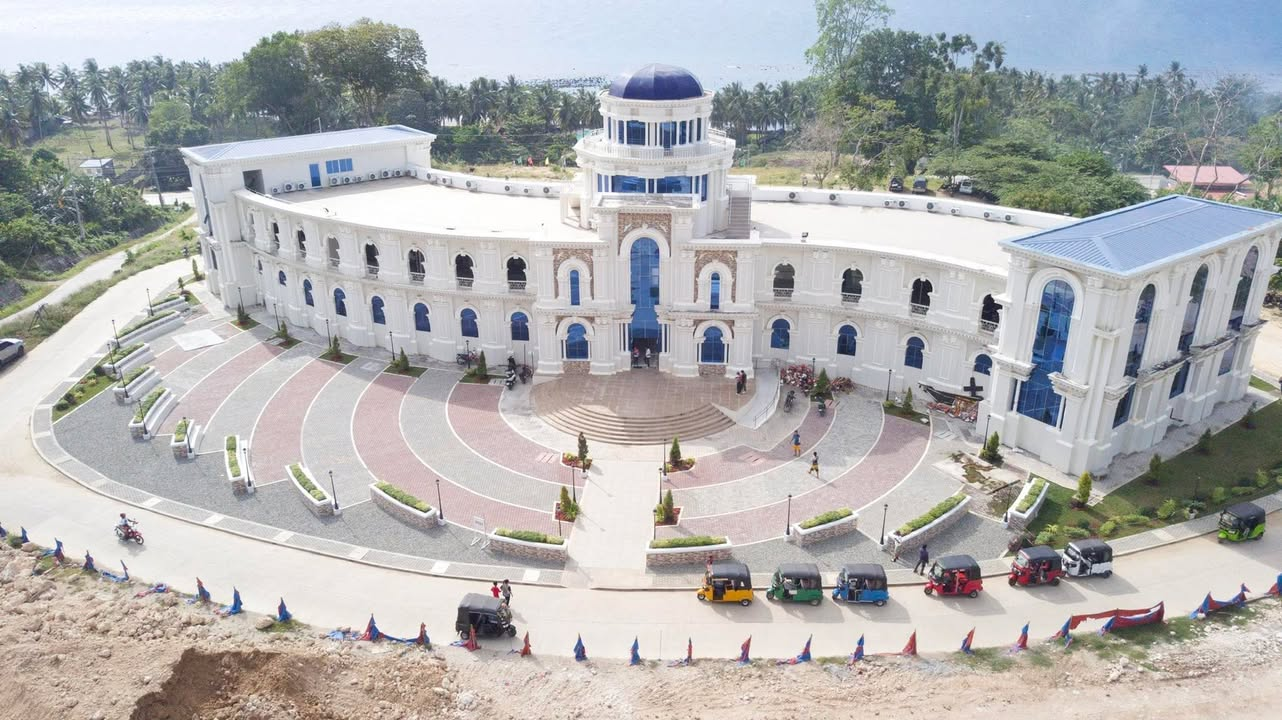
Initao Municipal Hall

- Lasang Secret Adventure is a 57-hectare natural forest with diverse flora and fauna located within the Initao–Libertad Protected Landscape and Seascape, accessible via the Butuan-Cagayan de Oro-Iligan Road that convenient snakes through the heart of the forest. Attractions and activities include split-nosed bats, caves, spelunking, fishing, swimming, snorkeling, scuba diving, cliff diving, and day camping. Facilities for overnight stays are present. Be aware though, that the place may be closed to visitors during major holidays. Philippine native trees are also found in the area.
- Mount Kitanglay considered to be the highest elevation in the municipality is located in Brgy Tawantawan. It is a beginner-friendly climb which affords a panoramic view of the Iligan Bay.
- Many private beach resorts also dot the shorelines of this town. From the white sandy beaches of Brgy. Tubigan, to the black sand beaches of Brgy. Gimangpang, to the rocky cliffs of Brgy. Pagahan and Brgy. Jampason.
- Inland resorts and venues include JEstrella Resort in Brgy. Jampason, Duthai Swimming Pool in the Poblacion, SJ & Telights in Brgy. Pagahan, Precious Overview with Bali feels in Brgy. Oguis, Julemons Nature Farm in Brgy. Tawantawan.
- The Initao Municipal Hall also draw interest from visitors because of its unusual design.

== Insfrastructure ==
=== Health Care ===
- Misamis Oriental Provincial Hospital-Initao is conveniently located within the municipality. Small clinics offering services such as dental, OB-GYN, and pediatric and private medical laboratories also operate here.

=== Transportation ===
- Initao can be reached by ferry through major seaports of Cagayan de Oro, and Iligan, and by plane via Laguindingan Airport. Public transportations such as buses, taxis, and other motor vehicles also ply through the town via the Iligan-Butuan-Cagayan de Oro-Iligan Road.
- Visitors and locals go around the town by just hailing public transportations such as the sikad-sikad (rickshaw), habal-habal (motorcycle taxis), tricabs, etc. Ride hailing apps do not cater this area.

=== Communication ===
PLDT Home Fibr, Globe, TM, Smart and Sun are serviceable in this town. DITO Telecommunity lines have also been constructed to cater customers in the event of its activation.

=== Electricity ===
Misamis Oriental Electric Cooperative (Moresco 1) is the only electric provider of the municipality.

=== Roads ===
Butuan-Cagayan de Oro-Iligan Road passes through the town.

Provincial, Municipal, and Barangay roads makes the interior barangay accessible. The state of these roads ranges from concreted to nerve-wracking dirt roads.

=== Government Agencies ===
- Hall of Justice
- Land Transportation Office (LTO)
- Department of Environment and Natural Resources - Community Environment and Natural Resources (DENR-CENRO)
- Philippine National Police (PNP)
- Bureau of Jail Management and Penology (BJMP)

=== Financial Institutions/Banks ===
- Land Bank of the Philippines
- 1st Valley Bank

== Education ==
- Initao Central School (ICS) is the largest and oldest public elementary school under the Department of Education (DepEd) located in the Poblacion. There are also public elementary schools located in almost every barangay in this town.
- Initao National Comprehensive High School (INCHS) is a public secondary school which also offers the Senior High School program. Its prominent features include the playing field which hosts different activities such soccer matches and concerts, and a covered court/activity center.
- Kalacapan National High School also under DepEd, offers both Junior and Senior High School programs and is located in Brgy. Kalacapan.
- Integrated schools, or public schools offering elementary and junior high school programs are also located in Brgy. Andales, Tawantawan, and Gimangpang.
- Xavier Academy High School is a Catholic private school which offers basic education programs.
- Eliz Learning Center is a private school offering preschool, kindergarten and elementary programs.
- Initao College (I.C.), formerly known as Initao Community College, was established in 2003 as an LGU of Initao-run higher education institution to provide residents of the municipality access to higher education, preparing students with the competencies necessary in both the local and global industries. Currently, Initao College offers CHED-recognized undergraduate programs in Business Administration, Hospitality Management, Elementary Education, and more recently, BS. Criminology. Since 2018, I.C. is one of the country's implementing schools under the Universal Access to Quality Tertiary Education Act.
