= DXMR-FM =

Radio station in Cagayan de Oro, Philippines

Magnum Radyo (DXMR)
- Cagayan de Oro; Philippines
- Broadcast area: Misamis Oriental, parts of Lanao del Norte and Bukidnon
- Frequency: 99.9 MHz
- Branding: 99.9 Magnum Radyo

Programming
- Languages: Cebuano, Filipino
- Format: Contemporary MOR, News, Talk

Ownership
- Owner: Reliance Broadcasting Unlimited, Inc.
- Operator: Radyo De Oro Corporation

History
- First air date: 1979
- Former call signs: DXRK (1979–2003); DXBD (2003–10)
- Former names: 99.9 RK (1979–2002); Bay Radio (2003–10)
- Call sign meaning: Magnum Radio

Technical information
- Licensing authority: NTC
- Class: B C D
- Power: 10,000 watts
- ERP: 20,000 watts

Links
- Website: Magnum999.com

DXMR (99.9 FM), broadcasting as 99.9 Magnum Radyo, is a radio station owned by Reliance Broadcasting Unlimited, Inc. and operated by Radyo De Oro Corporation. The station's studio is located at the Magnum Broadcast Center, 2nd floor, SBS Bldg., C.M. Recto Ave., Brgy. 24, while its transmitter is located along Camiguin St., Brgy. Macasandig Cagayan de Oro (sharing transmitter site with Radyo Trumpeta 95.7).

== History ==
=== 1979–2002: 99.9 RK ===
The station was launched on December 26, 1979, as 99.9 RK with the call letters DXRK. It was formerly owned by P.N. Roa Broadcasting System of then-Mayor Pedro "Oloy" N. Roa. The station carried slogan "The Rhythm of the City" (inherited from 99.5 RT in Manila [now 99.5 XFM] and Y101 Cebu) and aired a Top 40 (CHR) format.

Originally operating 24 hours a day, on February 3, 1997, it reduced its broadcasting hours from 8:00 AM to 12:00 MN.

99.9 RK ceased broadcasting on December 31, 2002, after 23 years of broadcasting.

=== 2003–2010: Bay Radio ===
On January 27, 2003, Baycomms Broadcasting Corporation acquired the station and changed its call letters to DXBD. On February 24, 2003, it was relaunched as 99.9 Bay Radio and carried a mass-based music format. It initially operated from 5:00 AM to 12:00 MN. At that time, its studios and transmitter were located at J.R. Borja St. In 2008, its changed its callsign back to DXRK. On March 2, 2009, Bay Radio began broadcasting 24 hours a day.

After 7 years of broadcasting, 99.9 Bay Radio signed off for the last time on December 25, 2010. During that time, the station was sold to Hypersonic Broadcasting Center, and its studios moved to its present location at the 2nd floor, SBS Building, C.M. Recto Ave., while the transmitter moved to its present location at Osmeña St.

=== 2011–present: Magnum Radyo ===
On February 28, 2011, after a series of test broadcast, the station was relaunched as Magnum Radyo, with the call letters DXMR, and switched to a "newsic" (news and music) format, similar to 89.5 Brigada News FM in General Santos.

Originally operating daily from 4:00 AM to 12:00 MN, it broadcasts 24 hours a day since October 1, 2012.

Magnum Radyo has been ranked as the overall #1 FM station in Cagayan de Oro, according to the KBP-Radio Research Council (RRC) Kantar Media Radio Surveys.

Magnum Gilbert as Electricity ident began October 31, 2019, and has drum like news sound effect as 99.9 has automation break 12am to 1am and 3am to 4am 2nd version from April 2021 until May 2022.
