= DXCO-AM =

Radio station in Cagayan de Oro, Philippines

Radyo Pilipino Cagayan de Oro (DXCO)
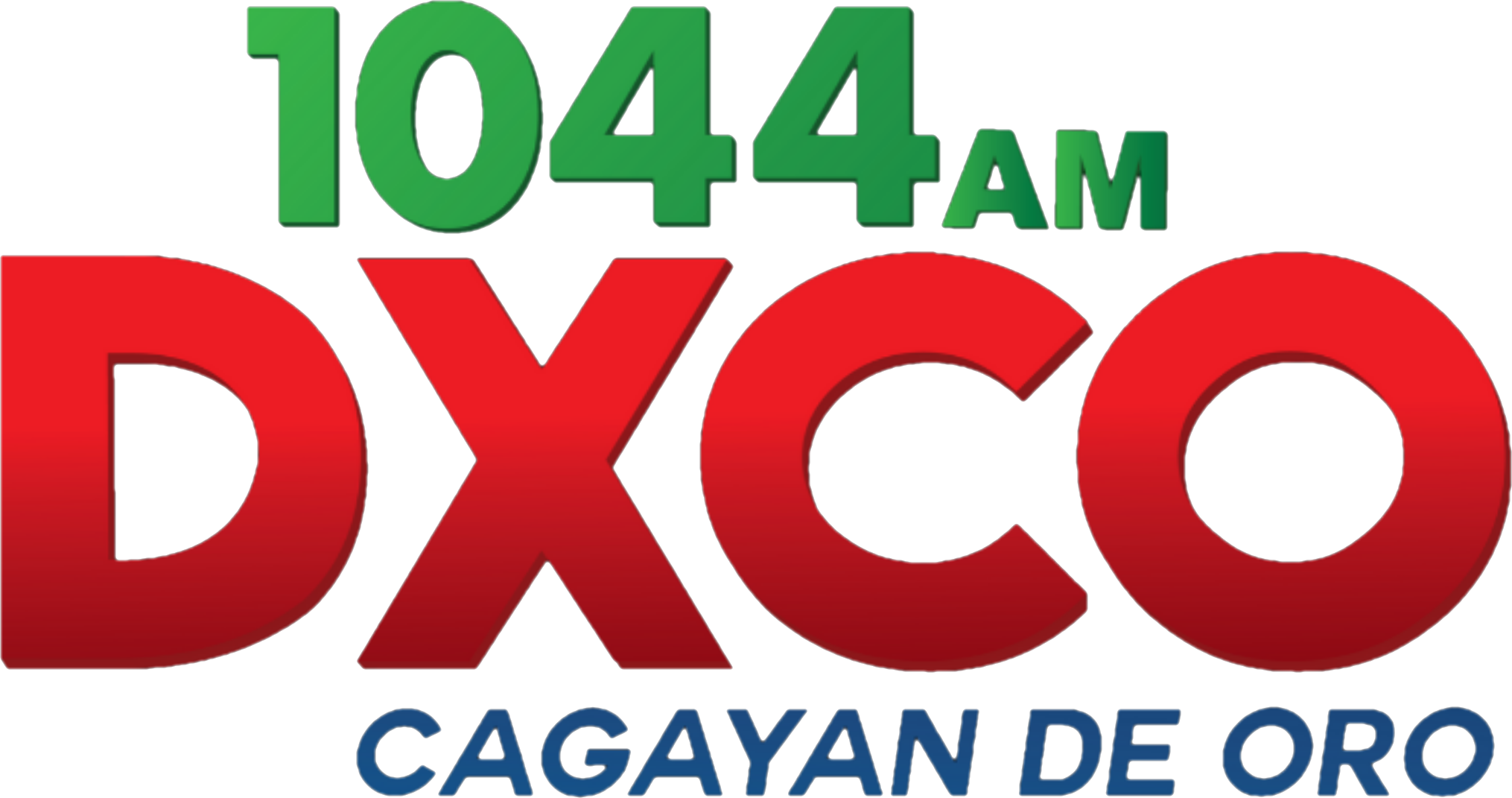
- Cagayan de Oro; Philippines
- Broadcast area: Misamis Oriental and surrounding areas
- Frequency: 1044 kHz
- Branding: DXCO 1044 Radyo Pilipino

Programming
- Languages: Cebuano, Filipino
- Format: News, Public Affairs, Talk
- Network: Radyo Pilipino

Ownership
- Owner: Radyo Pilipino Corporation

History
- First air date: 1968
- Former frequencies: 1030 kHz (1968–1978)
- Call sign meaning: Cagayan de Oro

Technical information
- Licensing authority: NTC
- Power: 5,000 watts

DXCO (1044 AM) Radyo Pilipino is a radio station owned and operated by Radyo Pilipino Corporation. The station's studio is located at ATCO Bldg., Capistrano cor. Gomez St., Cagayan de Oro and its transmitter is located at Brgy. Igpit, Opol, Misamis Oriental.

== On-air illegal gambling controversy ==
The radio station has been already raided by the Philippine National Police and GMA Network's public service program Imbestigador on their July 2, 2011 episode because of the non-stop on-air illegal gambling.
