= Cagayan de Oro College =

Private college in Cagayan de Oro, Philippines

PHINMA – Cagayan de Oro College Cagayan de Oro College PHINMA Education Network
- Dalubhasaan ng Cagayan de Oro (Filipino)
- Former name: Parent-Teacher College (1948-1967)
- Motto: Pro Deo Et Humanitate
- Motto in English: "For God and Humanity"
- Type: Private, non-sectarian
- Established: June 1947
- Affiliations: PHINMA Education Network
- Chairman: Ramon R. Del Rosario Jr.
- President: Chito B. Salazar, Ph.D.
- Students: 21,000 (2023)
- Location: Cagayan de Oro, Misamis Oriental, Philippines; 8°28′55″N 124°38′10″E
- Campus: 3 campuses all in Northern Mindanao; Carmen (Max Y. Suniel Street - Main Campus); Puerto Campus; Iligan Campus
- Colors: Green, Gold and White
- Nickname: PHINMA COC Scorpions
- Mascot: Golden Scorpions
- Website: www.coc.phinma.edu.ph
- Location in Mindanao Location in the Philippines

PHINMA – Cagayan de Oro College (PHINMA–COC) is a private non-sectarian college on Max Suniel St, Carmen, Cagayan de Oro, Philippines. The college offers a wide range of courses including criminology, education, arts and sciences, engineering, commerce, nursing, and vocational education. It is one of the leading educational institutions in the country in the field of criminology, having produced a number of topnotch graduates since its inception in 1947. The college also offers preschool, elementary and secondary education, which primarily serve as laboratory schools for its teacher education programs.

PHINMA COC attracts students from Northern Mindanao, especially the provinces of Misamis Oriental, Camiguin, and Bukidnon. Most of these students stay in boarding houses throughout the city.

The official student publication The Oro Collegian. Its supreme student government is the Cagayan de Oro College – Central Student Government (COC – CSG).

== History ==
PHINMA COC was formed in October 1946 by a group of civic-minded individuals as Parent-Teacher College (PTC). The aim, as defined in its Articles of Incorporation and By-Laws, was to give elementary, secondary, collegiate, and vocational education, with a non-political and non-sectarian characteristic. The institution formally opened in June 1948 and admitted not only children and youth to earn degrees but also men and women already employed who needed further education growth, knowledge and skills to help them advance professionally.

To attain the aims of the founders, the school initially offered classes in the elementary and secondary (day and night) school and courses in Education, Liberal Arts, Secretarial and Commerce in the tertiary level. The first classes met in a two-storey building at the corner of Apolinar Velez and Claro Recto Streets. Seven years later, all academic activities were transferred to Asok Building at the corner of Tiano Brothers and Gomez Streets, Cagayan de Oro.

In 1955, a bigger lot in Carmen, Cagayan de Oro, was acquired by the school. A two-storey building was constructed to house the classrooms, the administrative offices and laboratory rooms; it was occupied later that year.

In 1970, COC offered full courses leading to Bachelor of Science in Civil Engineering, Bachelor of Science in Chemical Engineering, Bachelor of Science in Mechanical Engineering, Bachelor of Science in Electrical Engineering, Bachelor of Science in architecture, and Associate in Geodetic Engineering.

In 1981–1982, the college was authorized to offer Master of Arts in Teaching Social Studies and Bachelor of Science in Secretarial Administration.

In 1984, the college received permission from the Ministry of Education, Culture and Sports (MECS) to offer Bachelor of Elementary Education courses. In the same year, the graduate expanded its major fields of concentration when it received MECS permission to offer Master of Arts in Educational Administration and Master of Arts in Elementary Education.

In the college, Engineering and Architecture courses were opened to meet demand. In June 1988, COC opened the two-year technical-vocational courses in Mechanical Technology, Electrical Technology, and Electronics Technology, obtaining government recognition in March 1991. In 1993, a permit to offer a full course in Bachelor of Science in Geodetic Engineering was granted. A year after, a permit was issued by the Department of Education, Culture and Sports (DECS) to offer the first three years of five-year courses in Bachelor of Science in Computer Engineering and Bachelor of Science in Electronics and Communications Engineering. As part of the ladderized curriculum of Bachelor of Science in Architecture which commenced in June 1991, a Certificate of Building Technology may be granted to those students who have finished the first three years of the said course, while Certificate of Architectural Interior may be granted to those who have finished the four curriculum years.

In the College of Arts and Sciences, three new courses were granted government recognition, namely: a four-year course leading to a Bachelor of Science in mathematics in 1990, Bachelor of Science in General Science in 1991, and the first two years of Associate in Computer Science in 1994. Three new courses are offered, AB Journalism, AB Broadcasting and AB Mass Communication, in AY 2001–2002. These courses are now granted government recognition.

The College of Commerce and Secretarial offered Marketing as an additional major in its Bachelor of Science in Commerce effective school year 1989–1990. The Bachelor of Science in Commerce ceased to offer Accounting as a major and, instead, this field was given a separate designation, now called Bachelor of Science in Accountancy, which is currently being offered in the College of Accountancy. It was granted recognition in 1993. The Bachelor of Science in Secretarial Administration offered Computer Secretarial Education as another major field. In June 1994, BSC major in Management Accounting was offered.

New advanced courses were also opened in the Graduate School, namely: Master in Government Management and Ph.D. in Educational Administration and Supervision in 1998, Master of Science in criminology in 1999, and Master in Engineering Management in 2000. The Ph.D. in Educational Administration and Supervision was granted government recognition in 2001.

At present, PHINMA COC is the only educational institution in the country to have been granted the authority to operate a commercial television and radio stations by virtue of RA 8740. The college is a member of national associations, has national awards for two straight years: the third- and second-highest accredited programs in 2003 and 2004, bestowed by the Philippine Association of Colleges and Universities – Commission on Accreditation (PACU – COA).

In 2012, PHINMA COC inaugurated the Puerto Campus. The new campus increased the total school population of COC by 19 percent one year after it opened.

== Ownership ==
Since 2005, PHINMA COC has been owned and managed by the PHINMA Group, an investment firm with interests in property, energy, education, and business process outsourcing.
