= List of dioceses of the Iglesia Filipina Independiente =

The following are the dioceses or bishoprics of the Philippine Independent Church, officially the Iglesia Filipina Independiente (IFI), an Independent Catholic denomination with nationalist and Anglo-Catholic orientation, along with their respective bishops and cathedrals (seats of dioceses), which were organized by the church's Supreme Council of Bishops and bishops conferences (as of 2026):

== Dioceses under the Obispo Máximo ==
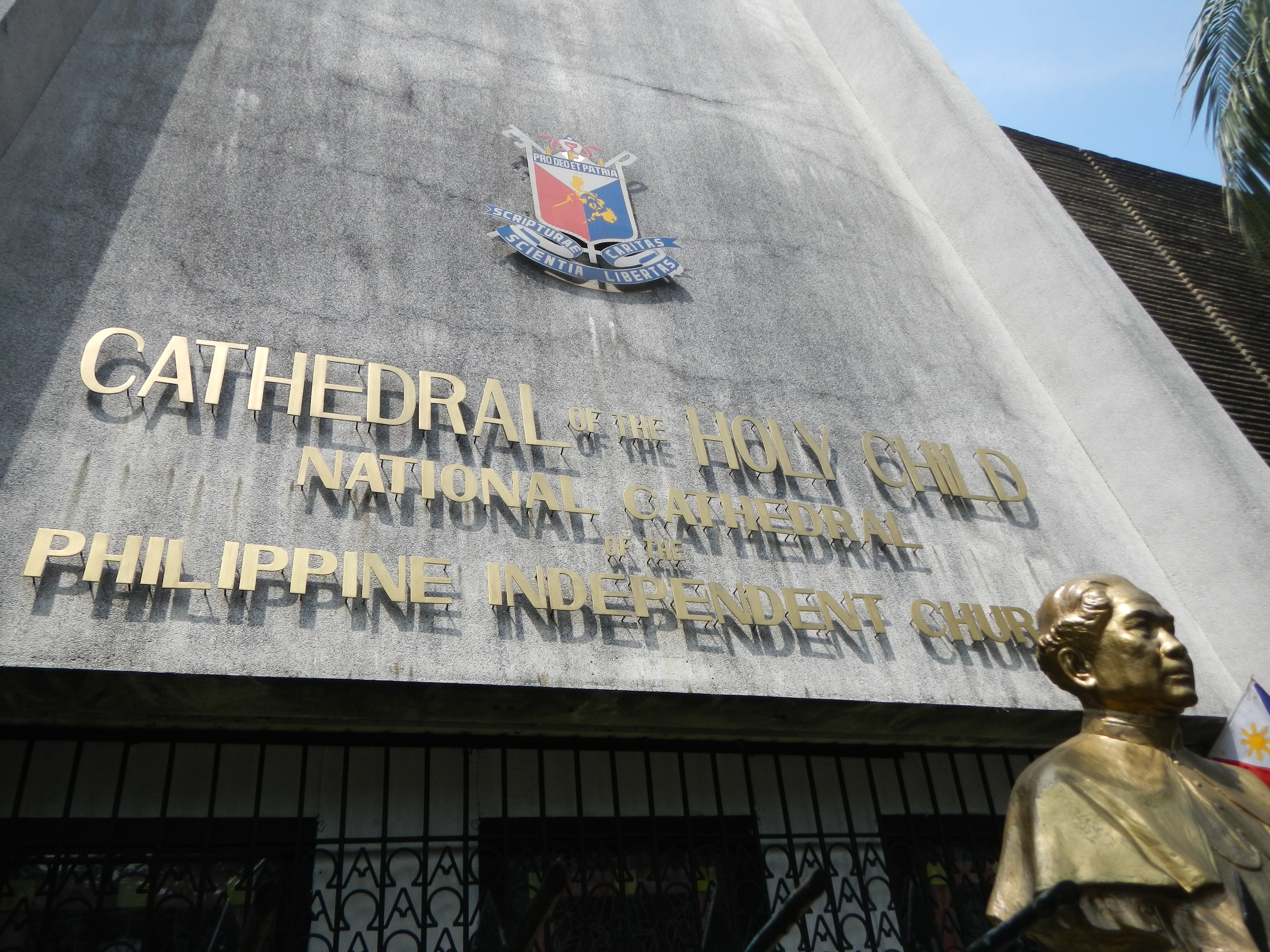
Cathedral of the Holy Child (National Cathedral) at Ermita, Manila
- Iglesia Filipina Independiente National Cathedral

Cathedral of the Holy Child
1500 Taft Avenue, Ermita, Manila

== Dioceses under diocesan bishops ==
=== North Central Luzon Bishops Conference (NCLBC) ===
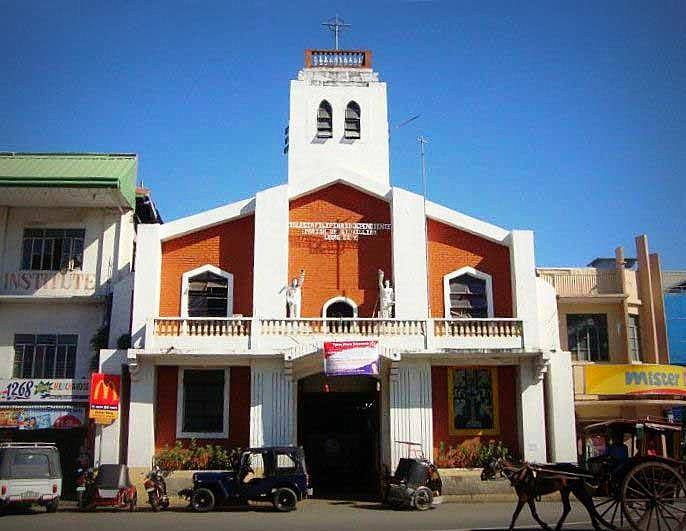
Cathedral of St. William the Hermit, Laoag City

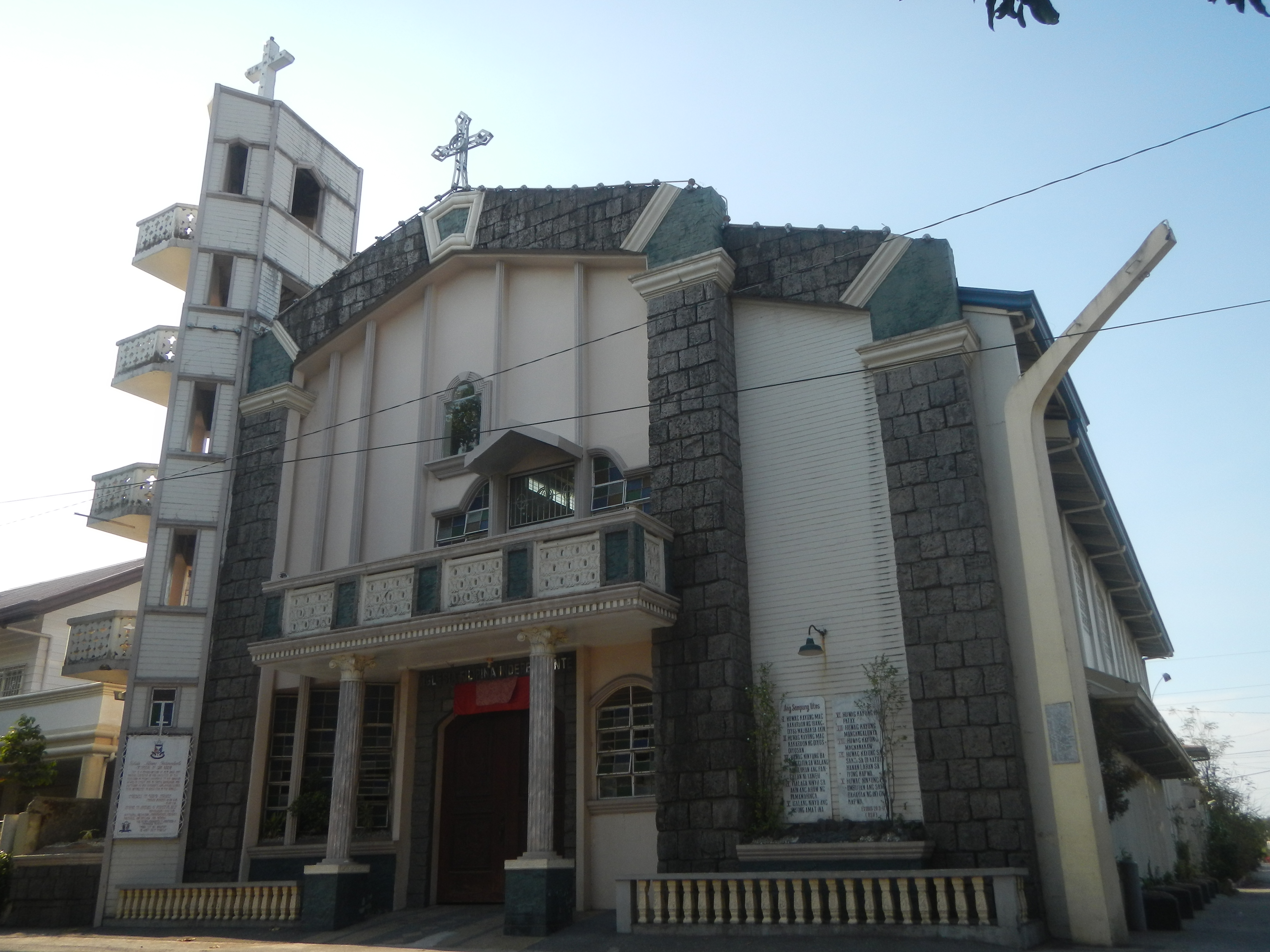
Cathedral Church of San Roque, San Felipe, Zambales

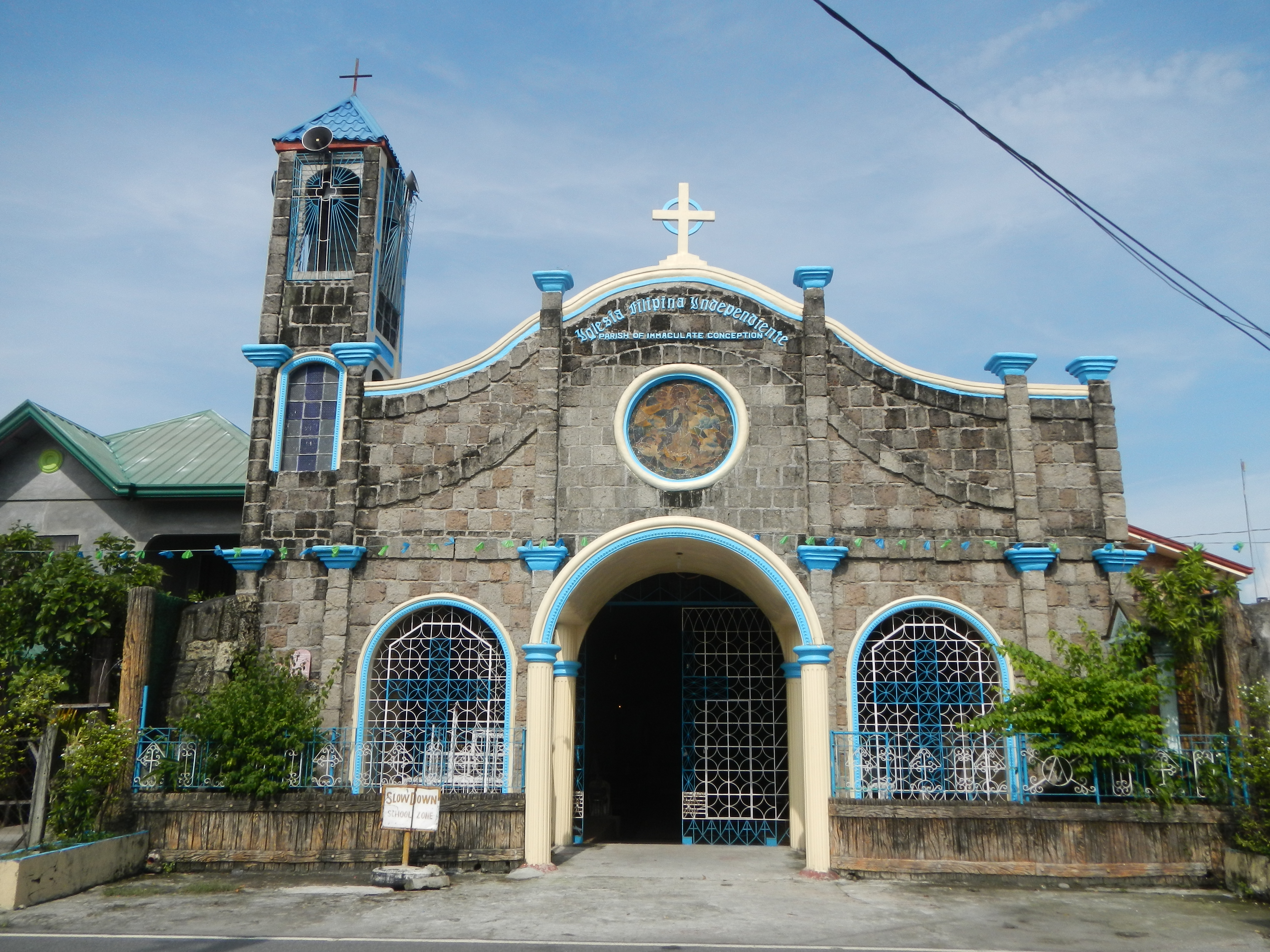
Cathedral of the Immaculate Conception, Victoria, Tarlac

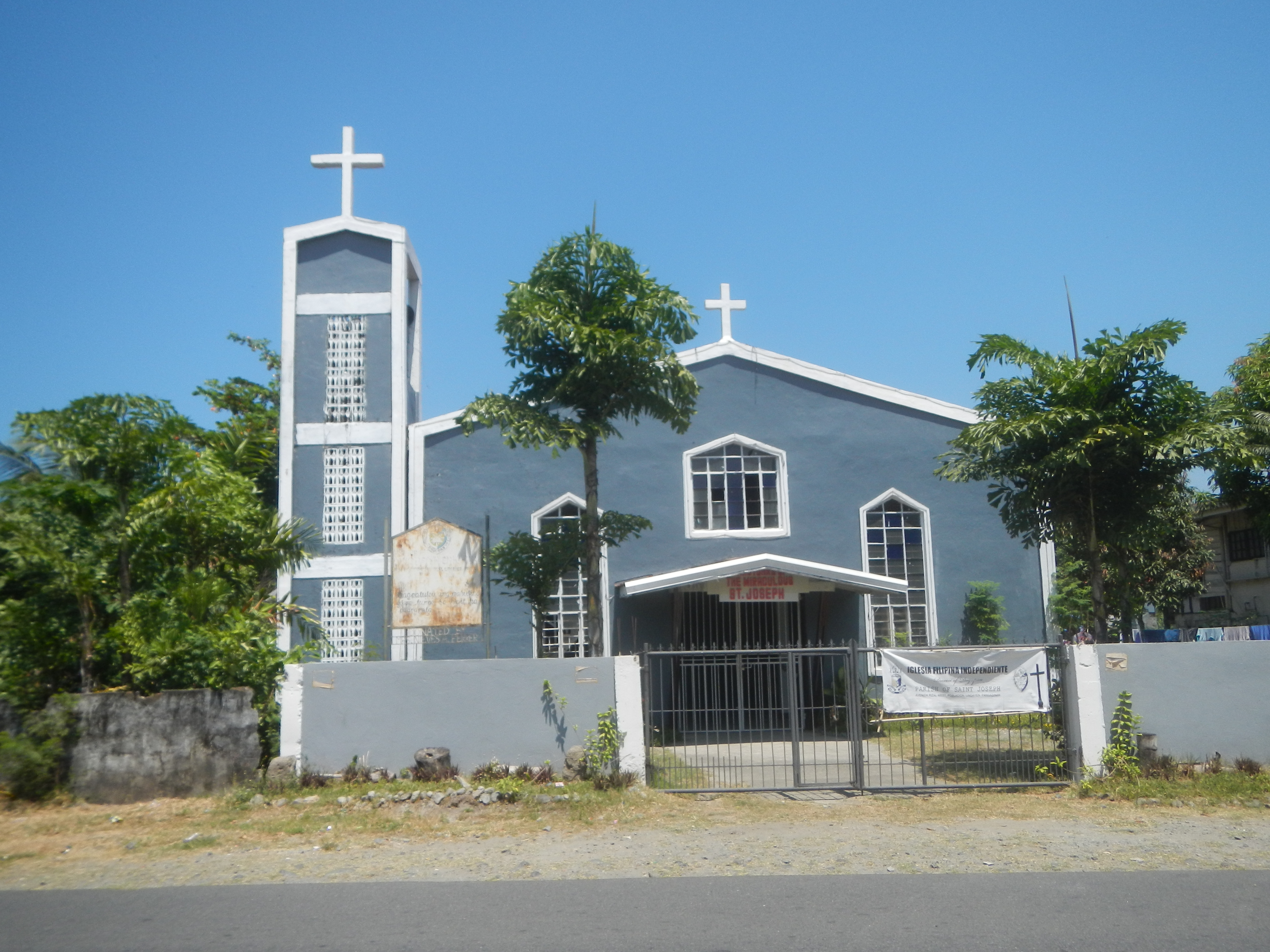
Pro-Cathedral of St. Joseph, SBVM, Lingayen, Pangasinan

Chairperson: Conrado M. de Guzman

- Diocese of Batac

Emelyn G. Dacuycuy
Cathedral of Saint Mary, Aglipay National Shrine
Batac, Ilocos Norte
Church building founded: 1902
Episcopal jurisdiction: All parishes and missions within the 2nd district of the Province of Ilocos Norte

- Diocese of Laoag

Vermilion C. Tagalog
Cathedral of St. William the Hermit
Laoag, Ilocos Norte
Church building founded: 1902
Episcopal jurisdiction: All parishes and missions within the 1st district of the Province of Ilocos Norte

- Diocese of Tuguegarao

Jerry L. Sagun (Interim Bishop)
Pro-Cathedral of St. William
Ballesteros, Cagayan
Diocese established: 2002
Church building founded: 1904
Episcopal jurisdiction: All parishes and missions within the provinces of Cagayan, Kalinga, and Apayao

- Diocese of Santiago (DioSa)

Jed C. Manzano
Cathedral of St. James the Greater
Santiago City
Diocese established: 1999
Church building founded: 1924
Episcopal jurisdiction: All parishes and missions within the southern territory of the Province of Isabela

- Diocese of Northern Isabela (DioNI)

Alvin V. Valera
Cathedral of St. Joseph the Worker
San Jose, Delfin Albano, Isabela
Diocese established: 2019
Church building founded: 1924
Episcopal jurisdiction: All parishes and missions within the northern territory of the Province of Isabela

- Diocese of Rosales (Eastern Pangasinan)

Emiliano D. Domingo
Cathedral of St. Anthony of Padua
Rosales, Pangasinan
Diocese established: 1941
Church building founded: 1902
Episcopal jurisdiction: All parishes and missions within the eastern territory of the Province of Pangasinan

- Diocese of Dagupan

Jovy B. Fodulla
Pro-Cathedral of St. Joseph, SBVM
Avenida Rizal West, Poblacion, Lingayen, Pangasinan
Diocese established: 1941
Church building founded: 1902
Episcopal jurisdiction: All parishes and missions within the western territory of the Province of Pangasinan

- Diocese of La Union, Ilocos Sur, and Abra (LUISA)

Nixon T. Jose
Cathedral of St. Stephen
San Esteban, Ilocos Sur
Church building founded: 1902
Episcopal jurisdiction: All parishes and missions within the provinces of La Union, Ilocos Sur, and Abra

- Diocese of Nueva Ecija

Jojit S. Sayas
Cathedral of St. Jerome
Baloc, Santo Domingo, Nueva Ecija
Church building founded: 1920
Episcopal jurisdiction: All parishes and missions within the Province of Nueva Ecija

- Diocese of Tarlac

Gilbert G. Garcia
Cathedral of the Immaculate Conception
San Nicolas, Victoria, Tarlac
Church building founded: 1902
Episcopal jurisdiction: All parishes and missions within the Province of Tarlac

- Diocese of Zambales

Conrado M. de Guzman
Cathedral Church of San Roque (St. Roche)
San Felipe, Zambales
Diocese established: 1958
Church building founded: 1903
Episcopal jurisdiction: All parishes and missions within the Province of Zambales

- Diocese of Nueva Vizcaya and Quirino (NVQ)

Alan Bert R. Pascual
Cathedral of St. Louis Beltran
Solano, Nueva Vizcaya
Diocese established: 1973
Church building founded: 1902
Episcopal jurisdiction: All parishes and missions within the provinces of Nueva Vizcaya and Quirino

=== South Central Luzon Bishops Conference (SCLBC) ===
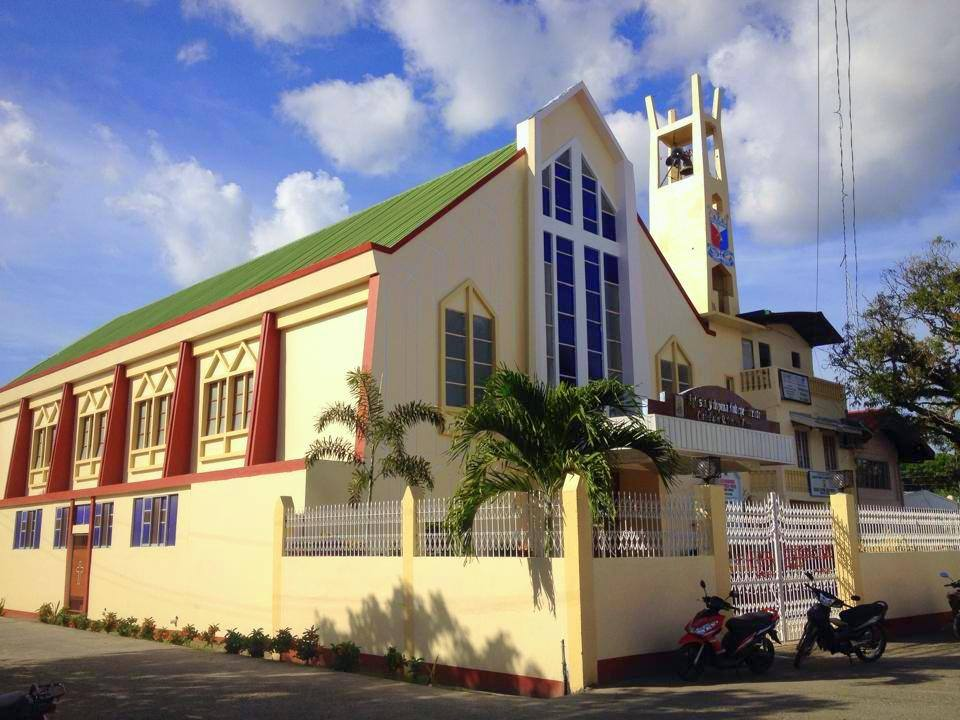
Cathedral of St. Vincent Ferrer, J.P. Rizal St., Tabin-dagat (Poblacion), Odiongan, Romblon

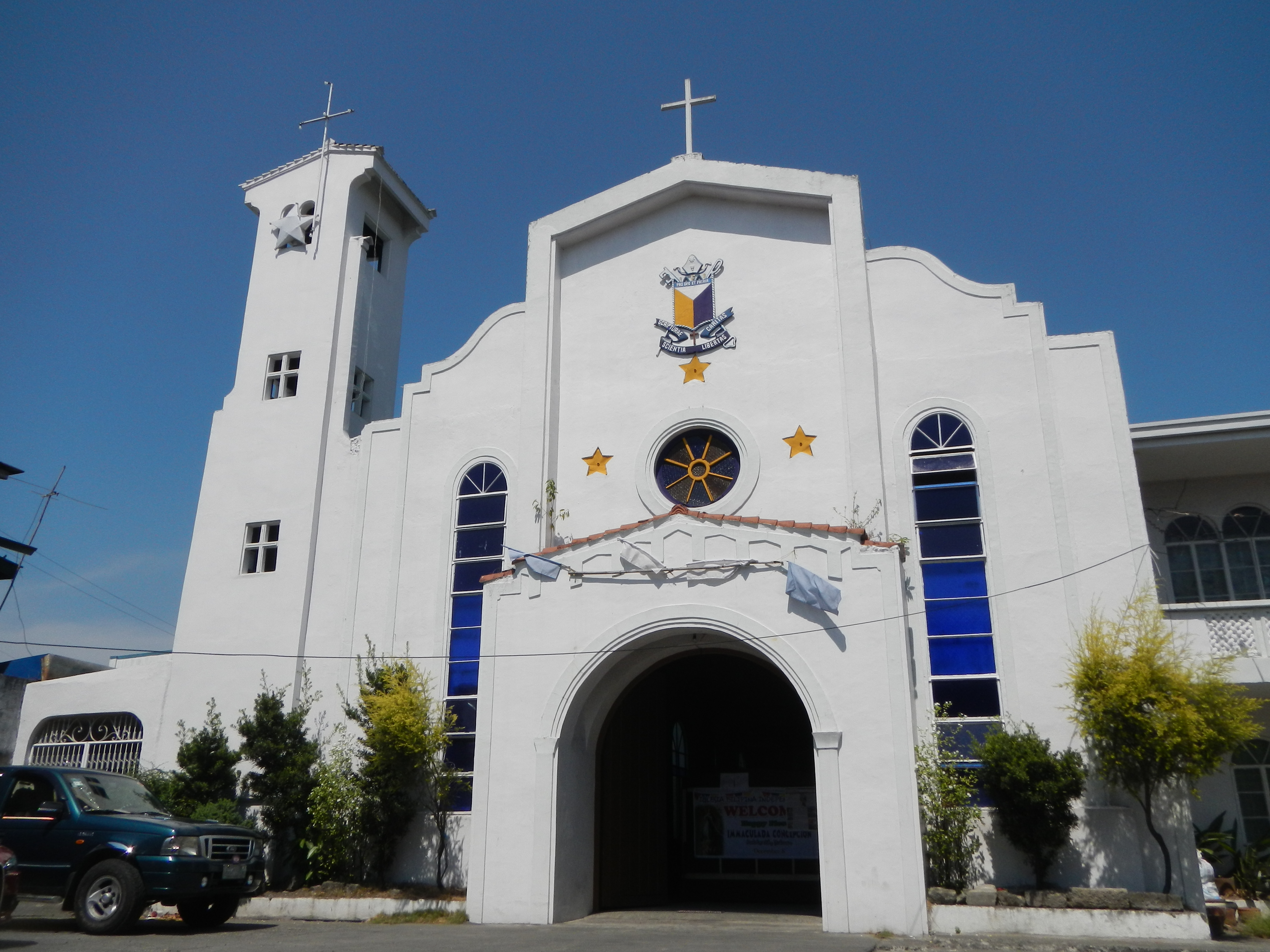
Cathedral of the Conception of Mary, Malolos City, Bulacan

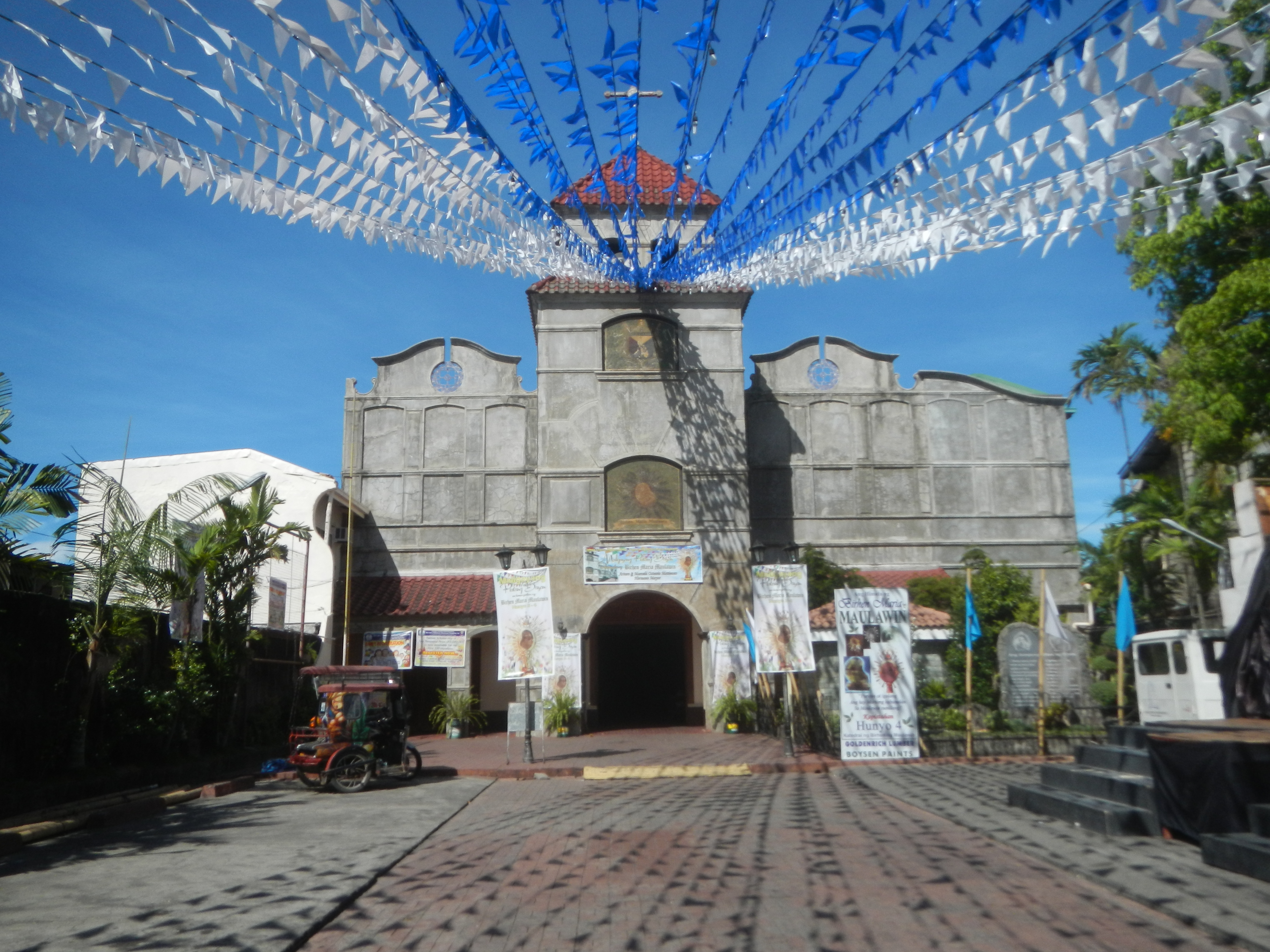
Cathedral of Our Lady of Maulawin, Sta. Cruz, Laguna

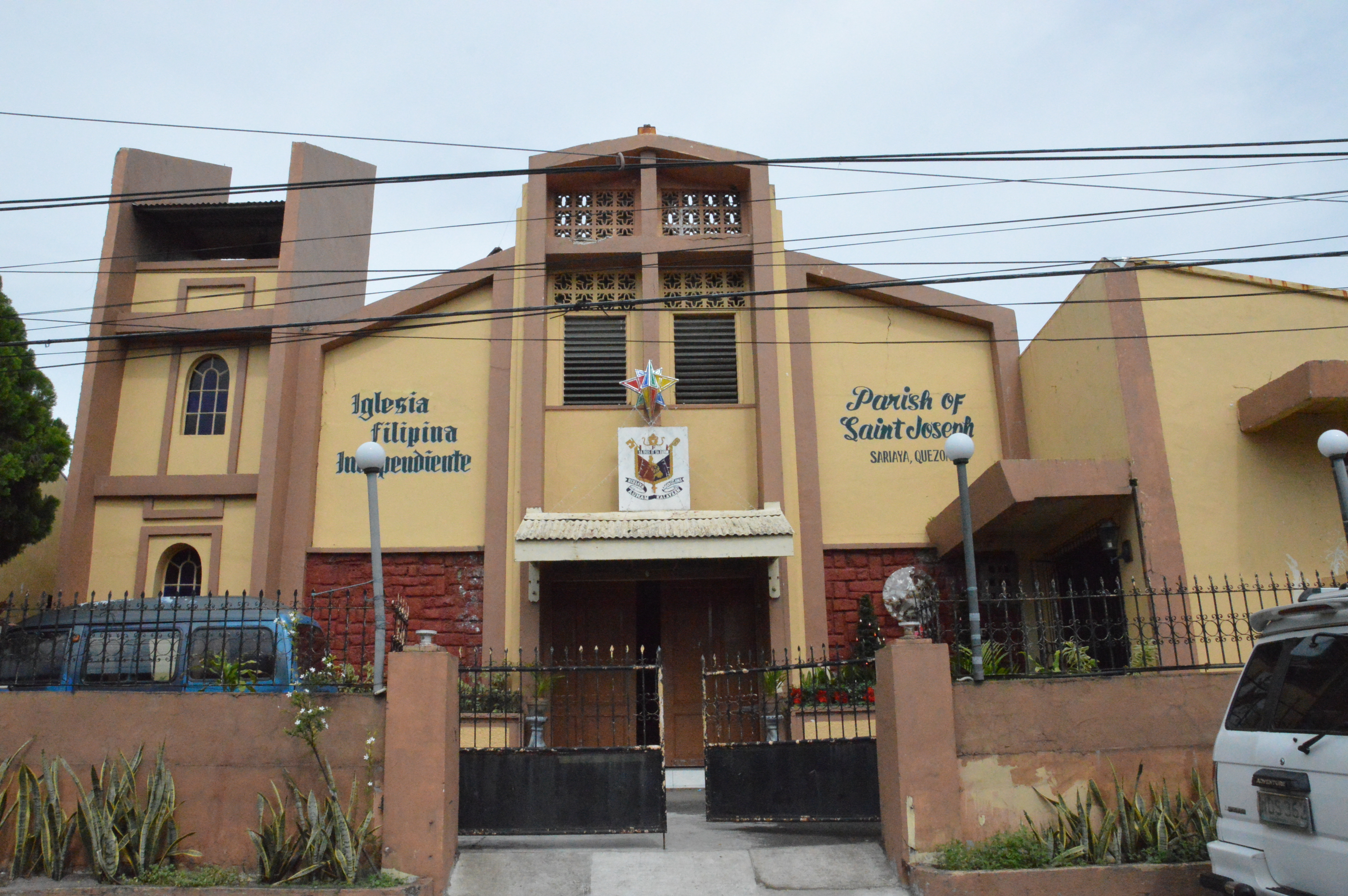
Pro-Cathedral of St. Joseph, Sariaya, Quezon

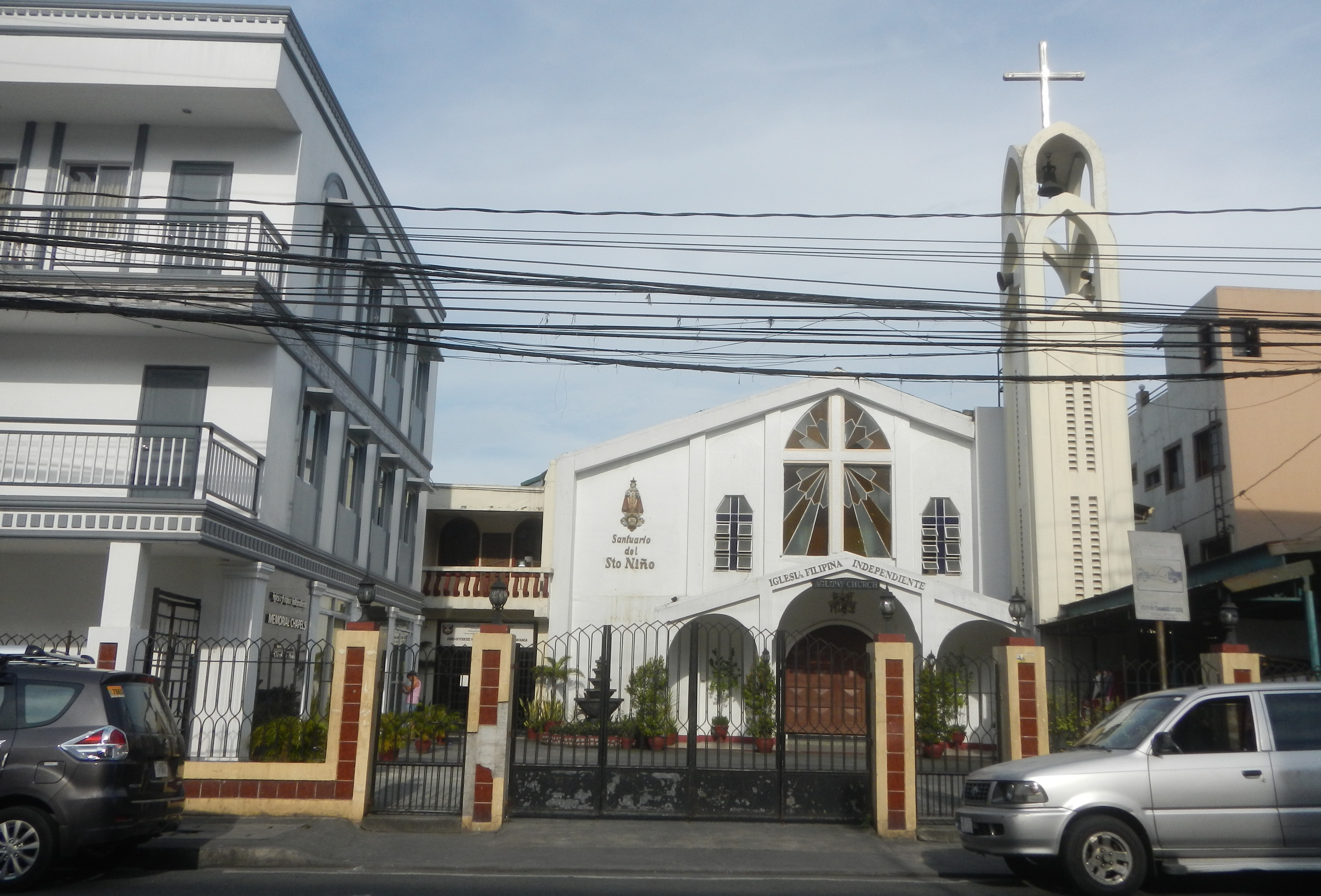
Cathedral of the Holy Child, Mandaluyong City

Chairperson: Vicente Salvador R. Ballesteros

- Diocese of Cavite

Joselito Perpetuo T. Cruz (Interim Bishop)
Cathedral of St. Michael and All Archangels
H. Rubio St., Digman, Bacoor, Cavite
Diocese established: 1952
Church building founded: 1902
Episcopal jurisdiction: All parishes and missions within the Province of Cavite

- Diocese of Greater Manila Area (DGMA)

Vicente Salvador R. Ballesteros
Cathedral of the Crucified Lord
Sampaguita St., Brgy. Apolonio Samson (Kangkong), Quezon City
Diocese established: 1902
Church building founded in the 1950s
Episcopal jurisdiction: All parishes and missions within Manila, Quezon City, Pasay, Caloocan, and other nearby places of Metro Manila

- Diocese of Bataan and Bulacan (BatBul)

Joselito Perpetuo T. Cruz
Cathedral of the Conception of Mary
F. Estrella St., Sto. Rosario, Malolos, Bulacan
Diocese established: 1966
Church building founded: 1902
Episcopal jurisdiction: All parishes and missions within the provinces of Bataan and Bulacan

- Diocese of Laguna

Rowel S. Arevalo
Cathedral of Our Lady of Maulawin
A. Mabini St., Sta. Cruz, Laguna
Diocese established: 1946
Church building founded: 1903
Episcopal jurisdiction: All parishes and missions within the Province of Laguna

- Diocese of Masbate

Santiago R. Azaula (Interim Bishop)
Cathedral of Our Lady of Remedies
Placer, Masbate
Diocese established: 1988
Church building founded: 1927
Episcopal jurisdiction: All parishes and missions within the provinces of Masbate and Sorsogon

- Diocese of Rizal and Pampanga (RizPam)

Godofredo J. David, Obispo Máximo XI
Cathedral of the Holy Child (Sto. Niño)
241 Aglipay St., Poblacion, Mandaluyong
Church building founded: 1903
Episcopal jurisdiction: Some parishes and missions within Metro Manila, particularly those that are formerly part of the Province of Rizal, as well as parishes and missions within the whole provinces of present-day Rizal and Pampanga

- Diocese of Odiongan

Ronelio V. Fabriquier
Cathedral of St. Vincent Ferrer
J.P Rizal St., Poblacion, Odiongan, Romblon
Diocese established: 1965
Church building founded: 1906
Episcopal jurisdiction: All parishes and missions within the province of Romblon

- Diocese of Mindoro

Nelson F. Faderogao
Pro-Cathedral of the Holy Child
Roxas, Oriental Mindoro
Diocese established: 2025
Church building founded: 1948
Episcopal jurisdiction: All parishes and missions within the provinces of Oriental Mindoro and Occidental Mindoro

- Diocese of Palawan

Fernando V. Quintans
Pro-Cathedral of Sts. Peter and Paul
San Pedro, Puerto Princesa, Palawan
Church building founded: 1992
Episcopal jurisdiction: All parishes and missions within the Province of Palawan

- Diocese of Marinduque, Quezon, Batangas and Camarines (MaQueBaCa)

Arnold M. Damayan
Pro-Cathedral of St. Joseph, Gasan / Pro-Cathedral of St. Joseph, Sariaya / Pro-Cathedral of Our Lady of Rosary / Pro-Cathedral of Sts. Philip and James
Gasan, Marinduque / Sariaya, Quezon / Rosario, Batangas / Lagonoy, Camarines Sur
Diocese established: 2000
Church buildings founded: 1908
Episcopal jurisdiction: All parishes and missions within the provinces of Marinduque, Quezon, Batangas, and Camarines Sur

=== Visayas Bishops Conference (ViBisCon) ===
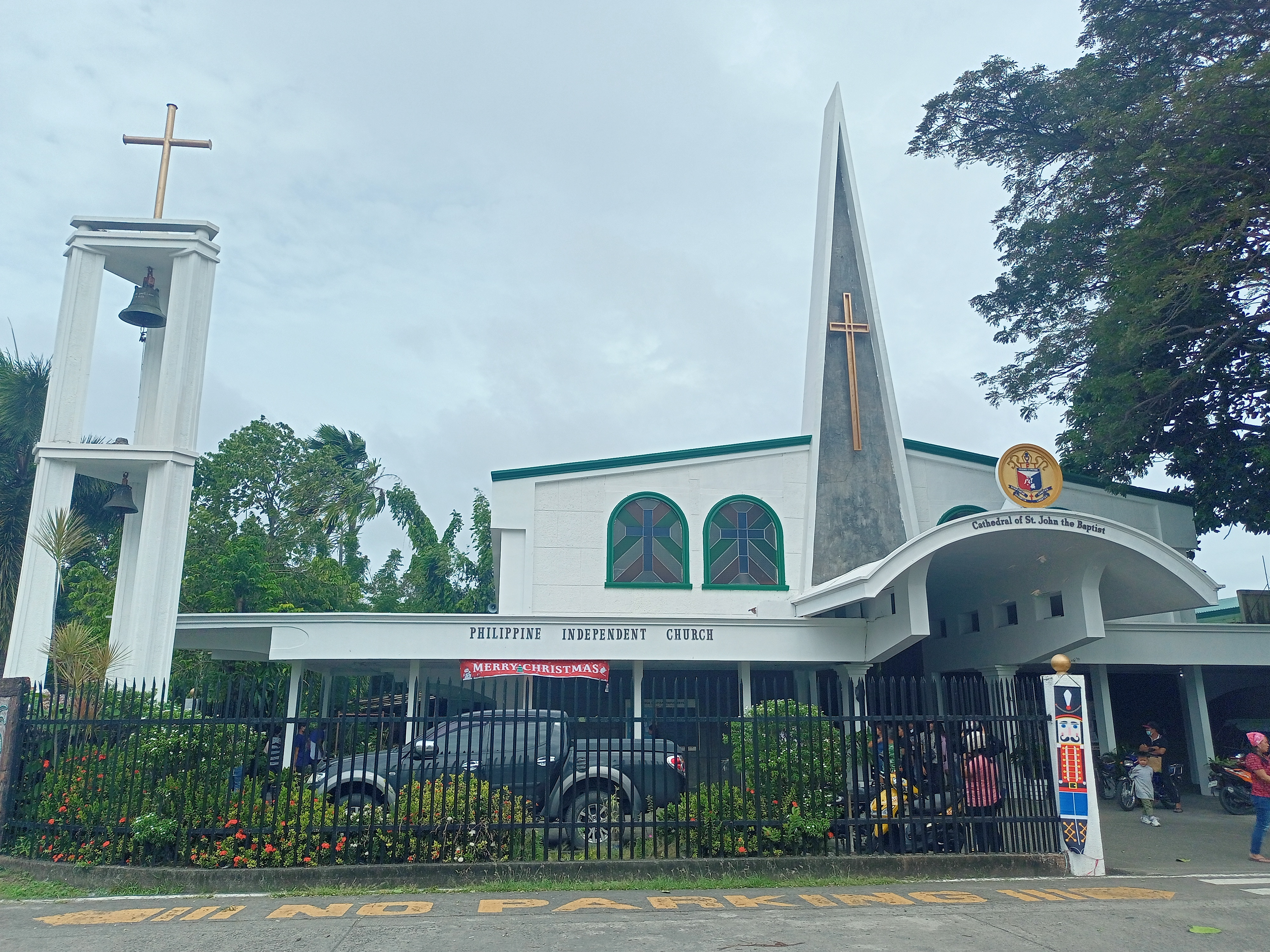
Cathedral of St. John the Baptist, Bago City, Negros Occidental

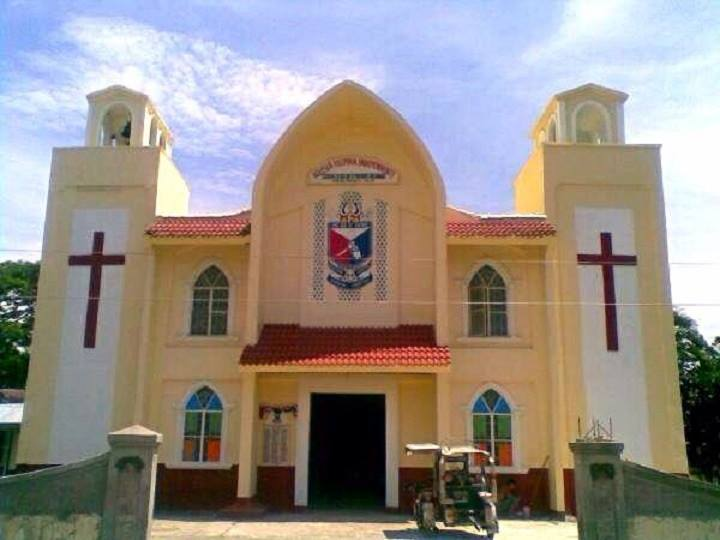
Cathedral of Our Lady of Providence and Guidance, Albasan, Numancia, Aklan

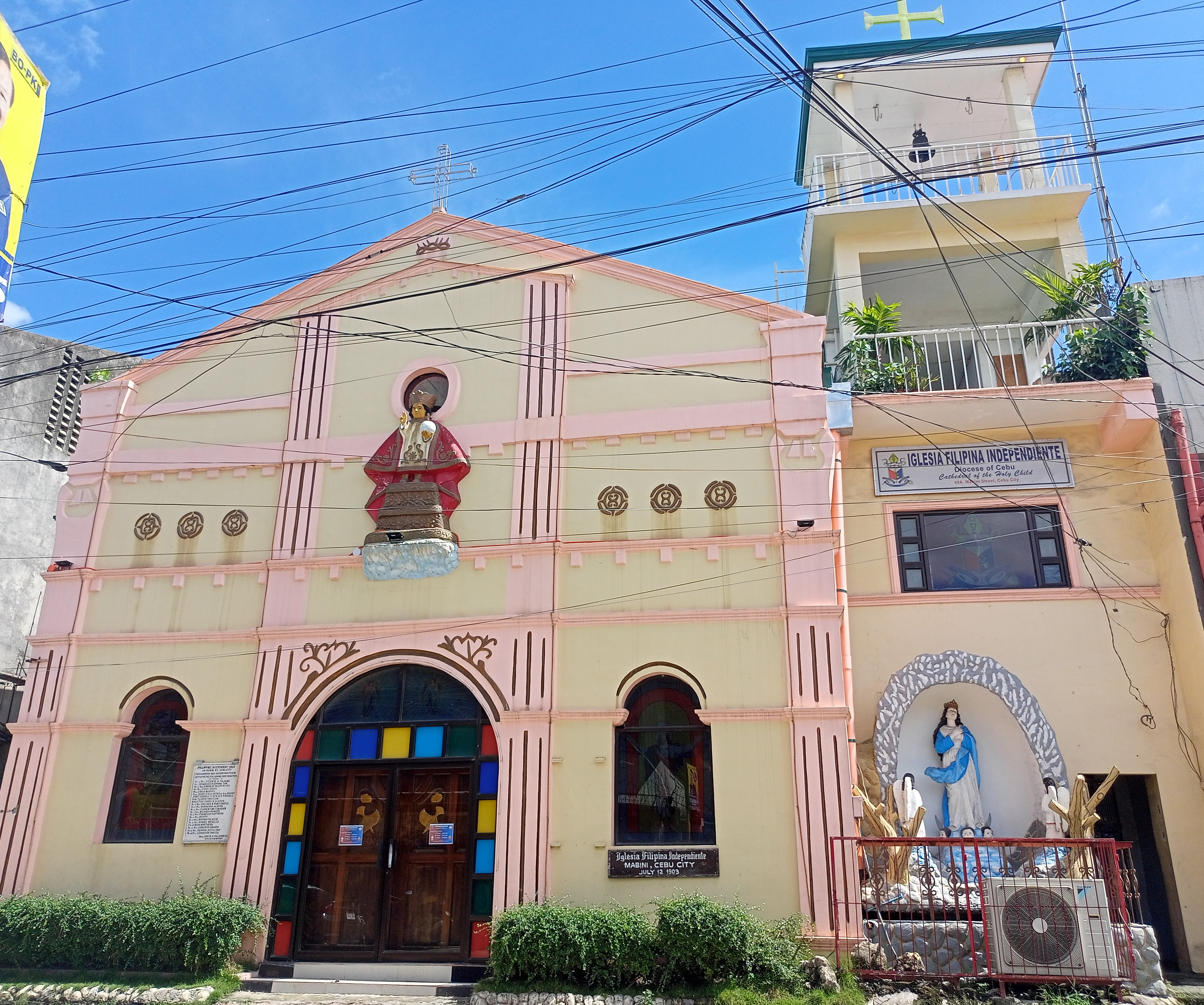
Cathedral of the Holy Child, Cebu City

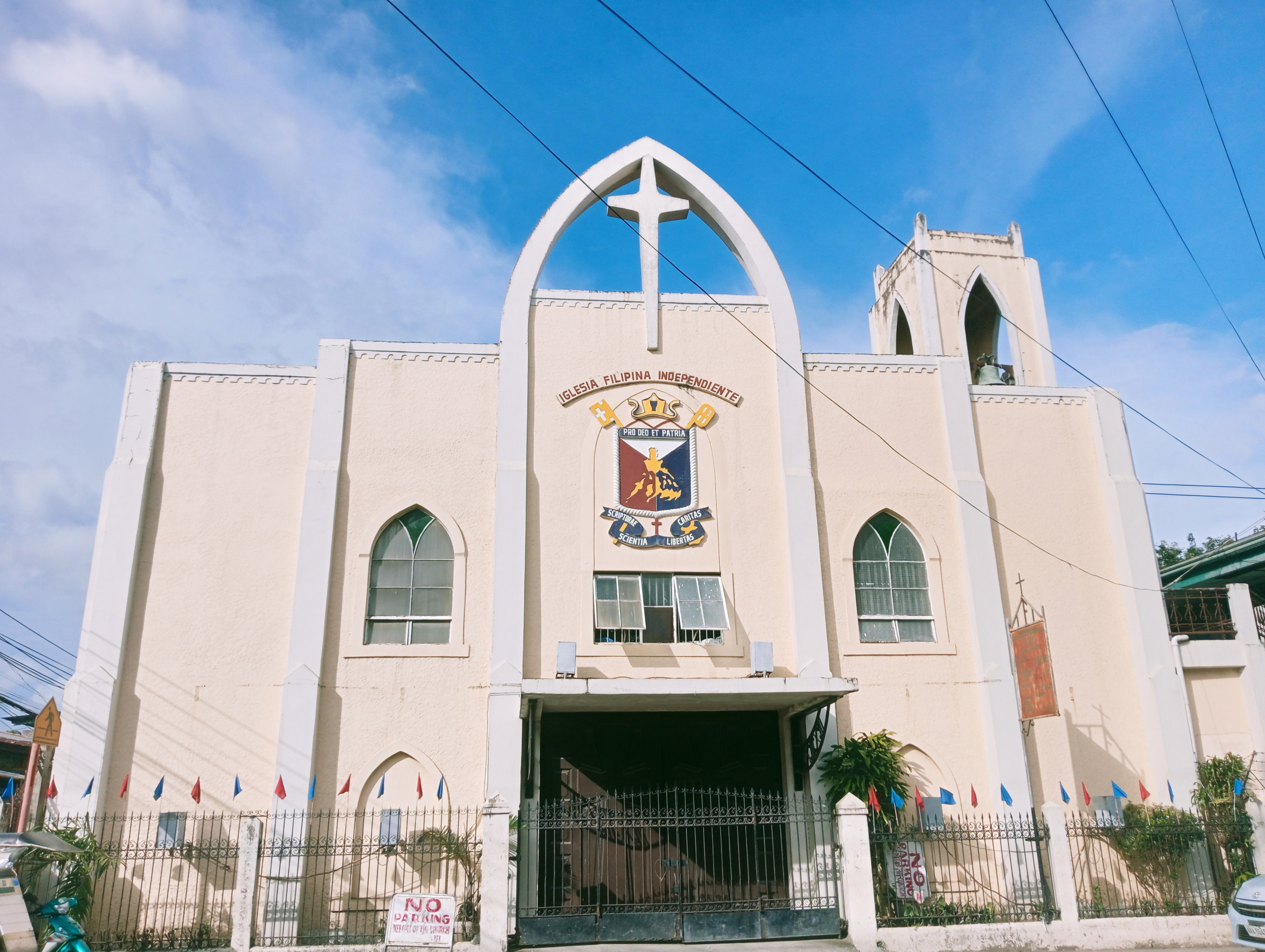
Cathedral of Our Lady of Peace and Good Voyage, Iloilo City

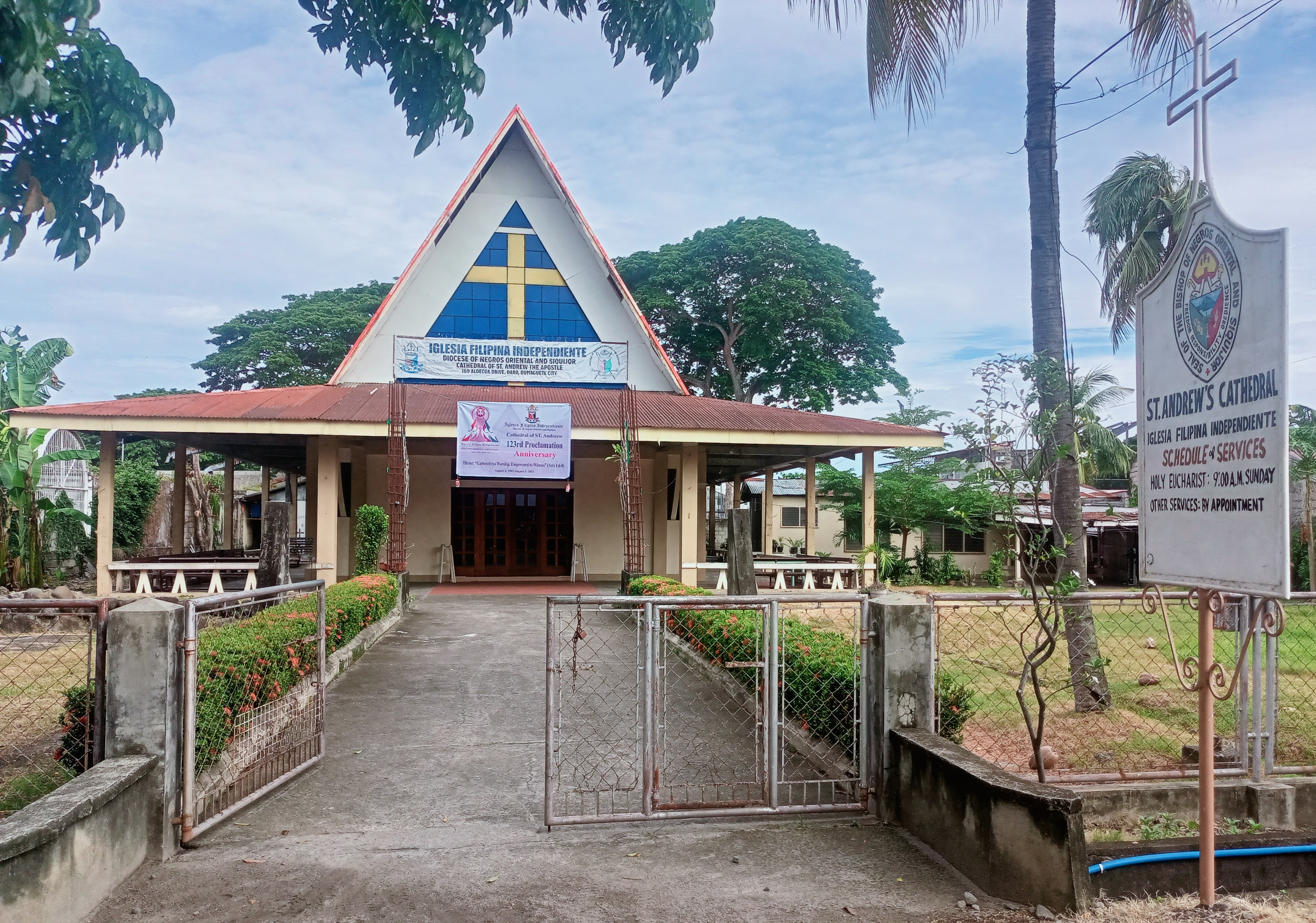
Cathedral of St. Andrew the Apostle, Dumaguete City, Negros Oriental

Chairperson: Alger D. Loyao Sr.

- Diocese of Antique

Leon T. Estrella
Cathedral of St. Jude Thaddeus
Veñegas St., Sibalom, Antique
Church building founded: 1902
Episcopal jurisdiction: All parishes and missions within the Province of Antique

- Diocese of Aklan and Capiz (AkCap)

Andy Mark G. Loma
Cathedral of Our Lady of Providence and Guidance
Albasan, Numancia, Aklan
Church building founded: 1903
Episcopal jurisdiction: All parishes and missions within the provinces of Aklan and Capiz

- Diocese of Biliran and Leyte

Victor M. Palero
Cathedral of Our Lady of Peace and Good Voyage
Almeria, Biliran
Diocese established: 2019
Church building founded: 1905
Episcopal jurisdiction: All parishes and missions within the provinces of Biliran and Leyte

- Diocese of Samar

Allan C. Caparro (Interim Bishop)
Cathedral of the Holy Trinity
Trinidad, Calbayog, Samar
Diocese established: 2019
Church building founded: 1905
Episcopal jurisdiction: All parishes and missions within the provinces of Samar, Eastern Samar, and Northern Samar

- Diocese of Padre Burgos

Arly M. Balili
Cathedral of St. James the Apostle
Sta. Sofia St., Padre Burgos, Southern Leyte
Diocese established: 2015
Church building founded: 1904
Episcopal jurisdiction: All parishes and missions within the Province of Southern Leyte

- Diocese of Cebu

Alger D. Loyao Sr.
Cathedral of the Holy Child (Sto. Niño)
A. Mabini St., Tinago, Cebu City
Diocese established: 2014
Church building founded: 1903
Episcopal jurisdiction: All parishes and missions within the Province of Cebu

- Diocese of Bohol

Warner C. Bulacan
Cathedral Church of St. Joseph the Worker
Tamblot St., Cogon, Tagbilaran, Bohol
Diocese established: 2014
Church building founded: 1990
Episcopal jurisdiction: All parishes and missions within the Province of Bohol

- Diocese of Guimaras

Renelito T. Invento (Interim Bishop)
Cathedral of Our Lady of Salvation
Salvacion, Buenavista, Guimaras
Diocese established: 1993
Church building founded: 1937
Episcopal jurisdiction: All parishes and missions within the Province of Guimaras

- Diocese of Bago

Virgilio B. Amihan Jr.
Cathedral of St. John the Baptist
Bago, Negros Occidental
Diocese established: 1948
Church building founded: 1903
Episcopal jurisdiction: All parishes and missions within the northern part of the Province of Negros Occidental

- Diocese of La Castellana

Jonash A. Joyohoy
Cathedral of St. Vincent Ferrer
La Castellana, Negros Occidental
Diocese established: 2025
Church building founded: 1904
Episcopal jurisdiction: All parishes and missions within the southern part of the Province of Negros Occidental

- Diocese of Negros Oriental and Siquijor (DiNOS)

Jonash A. Joyohoy (Bishop-in-Charge)
Cathedral of St. Andrew the Apostle
Aldecoa Ave., Daro, Dumaguete, Negros Oriental
Church building founded: 1903
Episcopal jurisdiction: All parishes and missions within the provinces of Negros Oriental and Siquijor

- Diocese of Iloilo

Christopher N. Macaday (Bishop-in-Charge)
Cathedral of Our Lady of Peace and Good Voyage
La Paz, Iloilo City
Church building founded: 1903
Episcopal jurisdiction: All parishes and missions within the Province of Iloilo

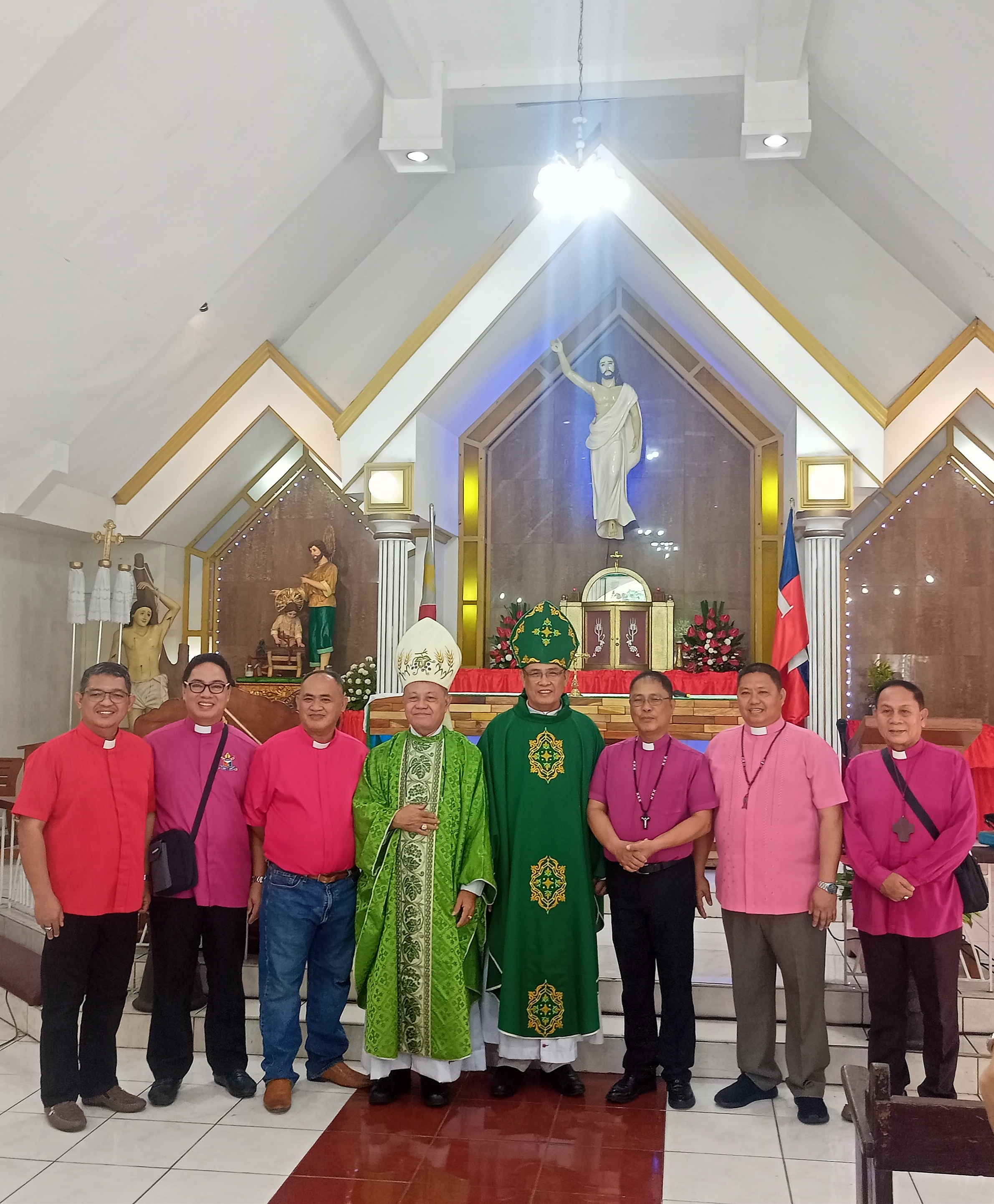
ViBisCon bishops in 2023; from left to right: Virgilio Amihan Jr., Victor Palero, Mervin Jose Elimanco, Alger Loyao Sr., Allan Caparro, Christopher Macaday, Arly Balili, and Leon Estrella.

=== West Mindanao Bishops Conference (West MinBisCon) ===
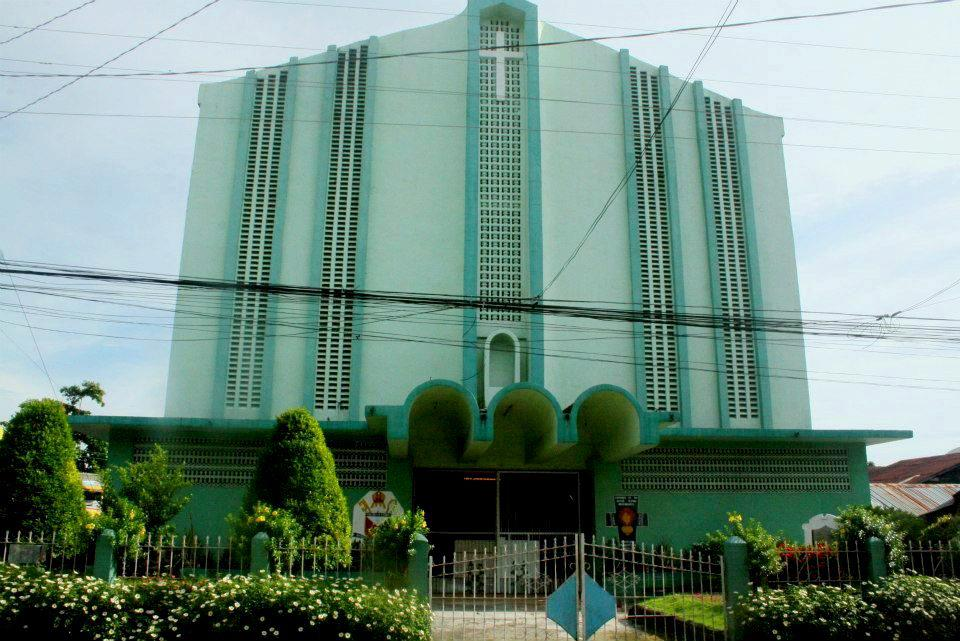
Cathedral Church of St. Mary, Ozamiz City, Misamis Occidental

Chairperson: Romeo G. Tagud

- Diocese of Cagayan de Oro

Felixberto L. Calang
Metropolitan Cathedral of Jesus the Nazarene
Pabayo-Pacana Sts., Cagayan de Oro
Church building founded: 1904
Episcopal jurisdiction: All parishes and missions within the City of Cagayan de Oro

- Diocese of Sugbongcogon

Romeo G. Tagud
Cathedral of the Lord of Compassion
Purok 5, Mangga, Sugbongcogon, Misamis Oriental
Diocese established: 2023
Church building founded: 1920
Episcopal jurisdiction: All parishes and missions within the eastern part of the Province of Misamis Oriental and the entire Province of Camiguin

- Diocese of Libertad

Rolly James B. Miso
Cathedral of St. Matthew
Poblacion, Libertad, Misamis Oriental
Diocese established: 2008
Church building founded: 1904
Episcopal jurisdiction: All parishes and missions within the western part of the Province of Misamis Oriental

- Diocese of Oroquieta

Victom Y. Batoy
Cathedral of St. Mary
Pastrano St. cor. Bishop Quijano St., Poblacion 1, Oroquieta, Misamis Occidental
Church building founded: 1902
Episcopal jurisdiction: All parishes and missions within the northern part of the Province of Misamis Occidental and the entire Province of Zamboanga del Norte

- Diocese of Ozamiz

Redeemer A. Yañez Jr.
Cathedral Church of St. Mary
Mabini St. cor. J.L. Luna St., Aguada, Ozamiz, Misamis Occidental
Diocese established: 2010
Church building founded: 1902
Episcopal jurisdiction: All parishes and missions within the southern part of the Province of Misamis Occidental

- Diocese of Pagadian

Dave A. Bitos
Cathedral of St. Luke, the Apostle and Physician
Gatas, Pagadian, Zamboanga del Sur
Diocese established: 2008
Church building founded: 1928
Episcopal jurisdiction: All parishes and missions within the provinces of Zamboanga del Sur and Zamboanga Sibugay

- Diocese of Tubod

Noel B. Lorente
Cathedral of St. James, the Lord's Brother and the Just
Rufo dela Cruz St., Tubod, Lanao del Norte
Church building founded: 1924
Episcopal jurisdiction: All parishes and missions within the Province of Lanao del Norte

- Diocese of Malaybalay

Gil M. Dinapo
Cathedral of the Transfiguration
Lanzones Rd., Casisang, Malaybalay, Bukidnon
Diocese established: 2012
Church building founded: 1904
Episcopal jurisdiction: All parishes and missions within the Province of Bukidnon

- Diocese of Koronadal (DioKor)

Giomary P. Neri
Cathedral of the Holy Trinity
Koronadal, South Cotabato
Church building founded: 1950
Episcopal jurisdiction: All parishes and missions within the provinces of South Cotabato (except General Santos and Polomolok), Cotabato, Maguindanao del Norte, Maguindanao del Sur, and Sultan Kudarat

=== East Mindanao Bishops Conference (East MinBisCon) ===
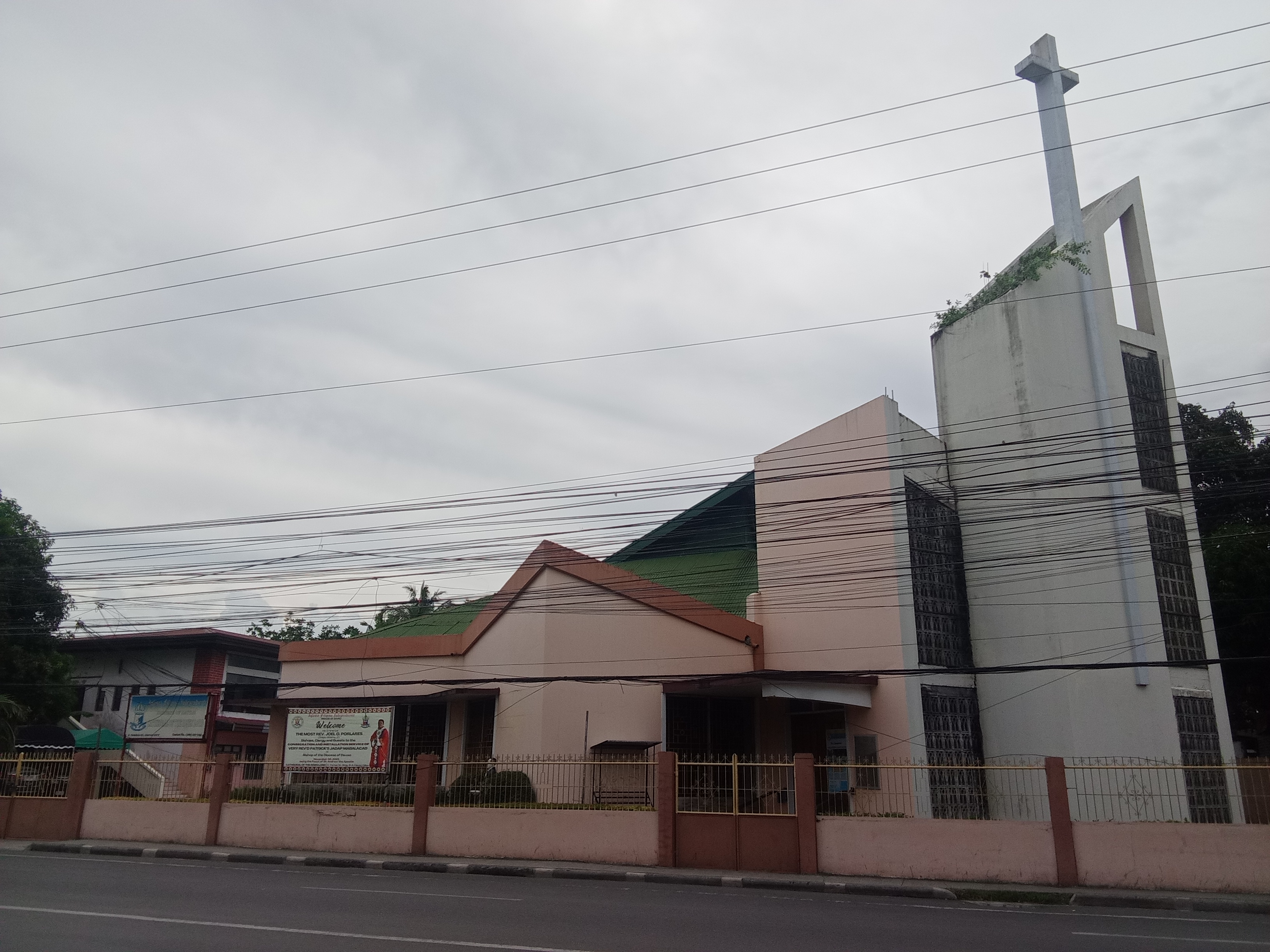
Cathedral of the Risen Lord, Davao City

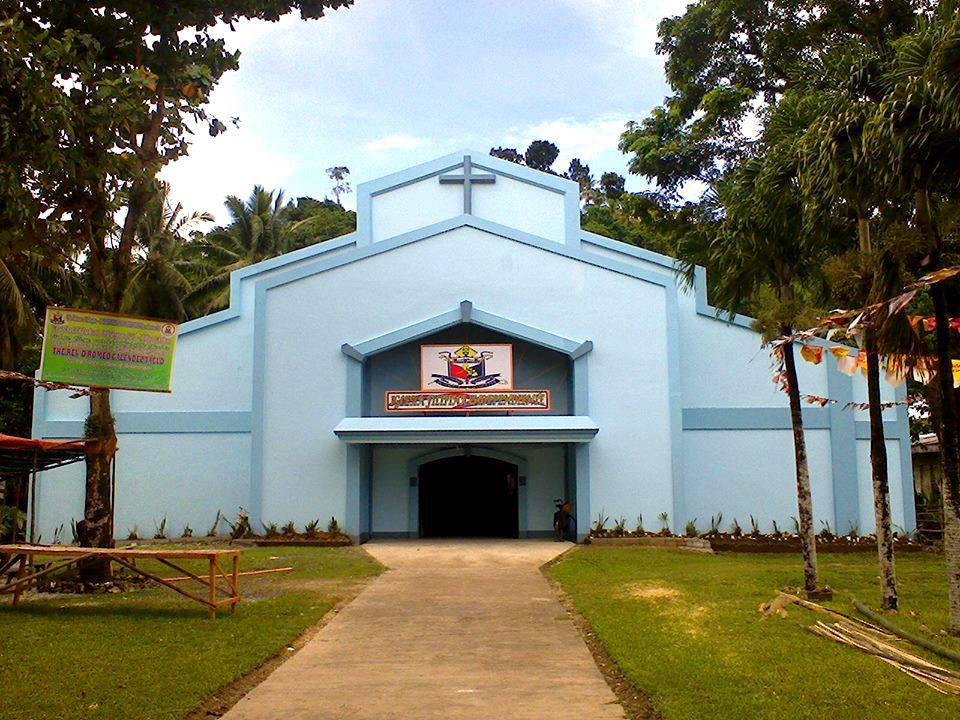
Cathedral of the Holy Child, Dapa, Siargao, Surigao del Norte

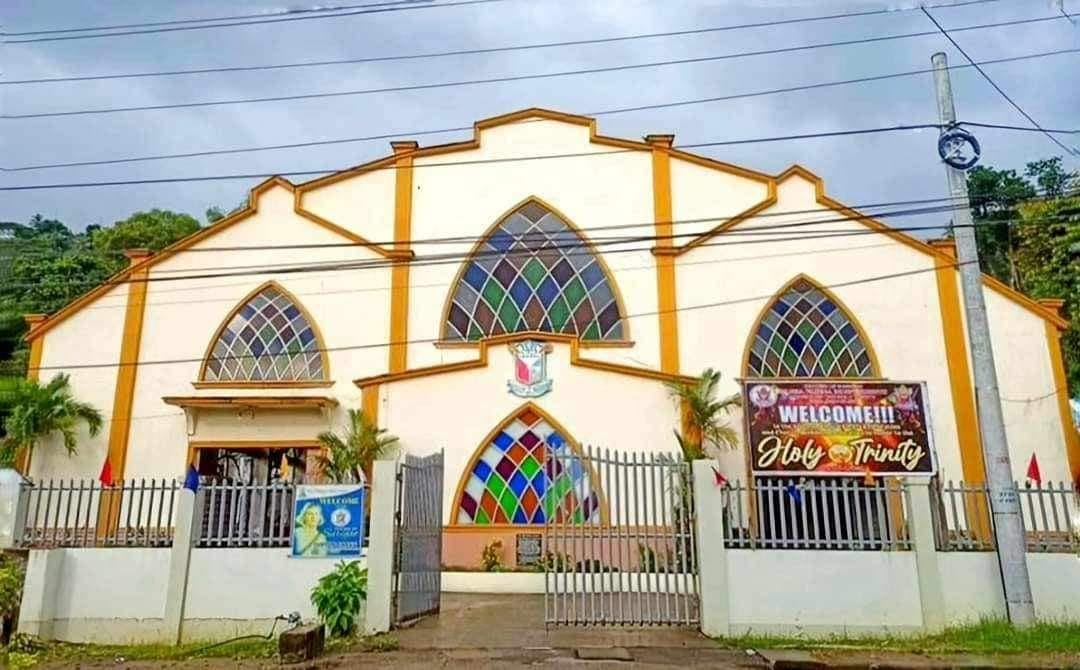
Cathedral of the Most Holy Trinity, Placer, Surigao del Norte

Chairperson: Carlo A. Morales

- Diocese of Cortes

Denny D. Dapitan
Cathedral of St. Joseph, SBVM
Cortes, Surigao del Sur
Diocese established: 2015
Church building founded: 1910
Episcopal jurisdiction: All parishes and missions within the provinces of Surigao del Sur and Agusan del Sur

- Diocese of Cabadbaran

Delfin D. Callao Jr.
Cathedral of Our Lady of Presentation
Cabadbaran, Agusan del Norte
Church building founded: 1903
Episcopal jurisdiction: All parishes and missions within the Province of Agusan del Norte

- Diocese of Davao

Patrick's J. Mabalacad
Cathedral of the Risen Lord
F. Torres-Tuvera Sts., Barangay 9-A, Davao City
Diocese established: 2010
Church building founded: 1924
Episcopal jurisdiction: All parishes and missions within the provinces of Davao del Norte, Davao del Sur, Davao de Oro, Davao Occidental, Davao Oriental, Sarangani, the City of General Santos, and the Municipality of Polomolok

- Diocese of Surigao

Rhee M. Timbang, Obispo Máximo XIII
Cathedral of the Transfiguration
Km. 2, National Road, Surigao City, Surigao del Norte
Diocese established: 1994
Church building founded: 1904
Episcopal jurisdiction: All parishes and missions within the northern territory in the mainland part of the Province of Surigao del Norte

- Diocese of Siargao

Paulo O. Esparrago Jr.
Cathedral of the Holy Child
Dapa, Surigao del Norte
Diocese established: 2013
Church building founded: 1908
Episcopal jurisdiction: All parishes and missions within the islands of Siargao and Bucas Grande

- Diocese of Dinagat

Allan G. Buñe
Cathedral of the Blessed Virgin Mary
Dinagat, Dinagat Islands
Diocese established: 2011
Church building founded: 1904
Episcopal jurisdiction: All parishes and missions within the Province of Dinagat Islands

- Diocese of Placer

Carlo A. Morales
Cathedral of the Most Holy Trinity
Placer, Surigao del Norte
Diocese established: 2024
Church building founded: 1905
Episcopal jurisdiction: All parishes and missions within the southern territory in the mainland part of the Province of Surigao del Norte

== Dioceses abroad ==
=== Overseas Bishops Conference ===
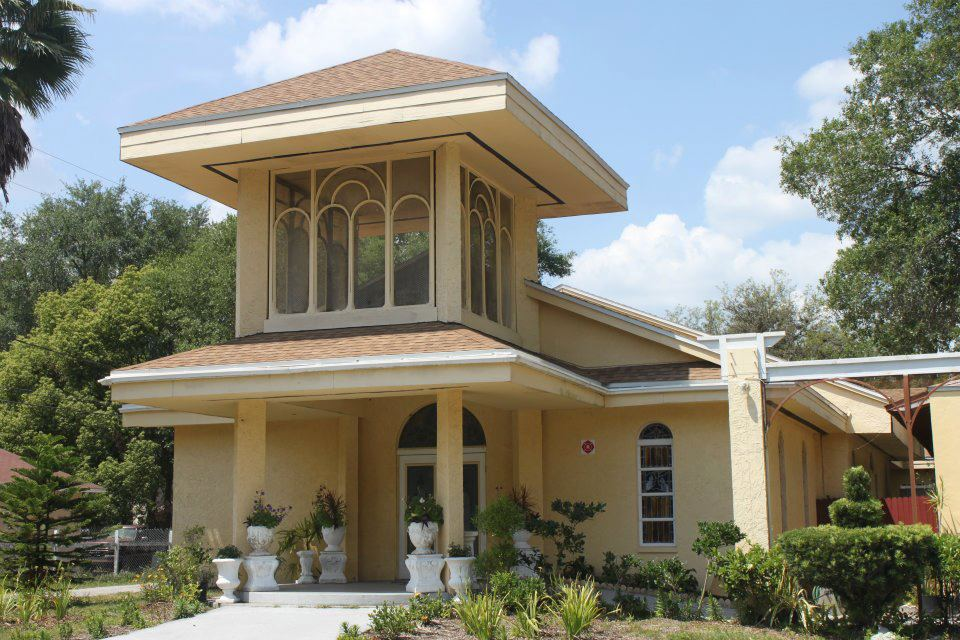
The Cathedral of Jesus of Nazareth was the first church of IFI outside the Philippines, inaugurated and blessed on 19 May 1979.

Chairperson: Gerry F. Engnan

==== North America ====
- Diocese of Tampa

Roberto R. Pamatmat Jr.
Cathedral of Jesus of Nazareth
14322 North Blvd., Tampa, Florida, United States of America
Diocese established: April 15, 2012
Church building founded: 1977
Episcopal jurisdiction: All parishes and missions within the eastern territories of USA and Canada

- Diocese of Western USA and Western Canada (WUSACA) and the Pacific Islands

Gerry F. Engnan
Cathedral of Our Lady of the Immaculate Conception (church building of Saint Mark's Episcopal Church)
14646 Sherman Way, Van Nuys, California, United States of America
Church building founded: 1922
Episcopal jurisdiction: All parishes and missions within the western territories of USA and Canada, and the Pacific Islands

== Organized worshipping congregations/fellowships abroad ==
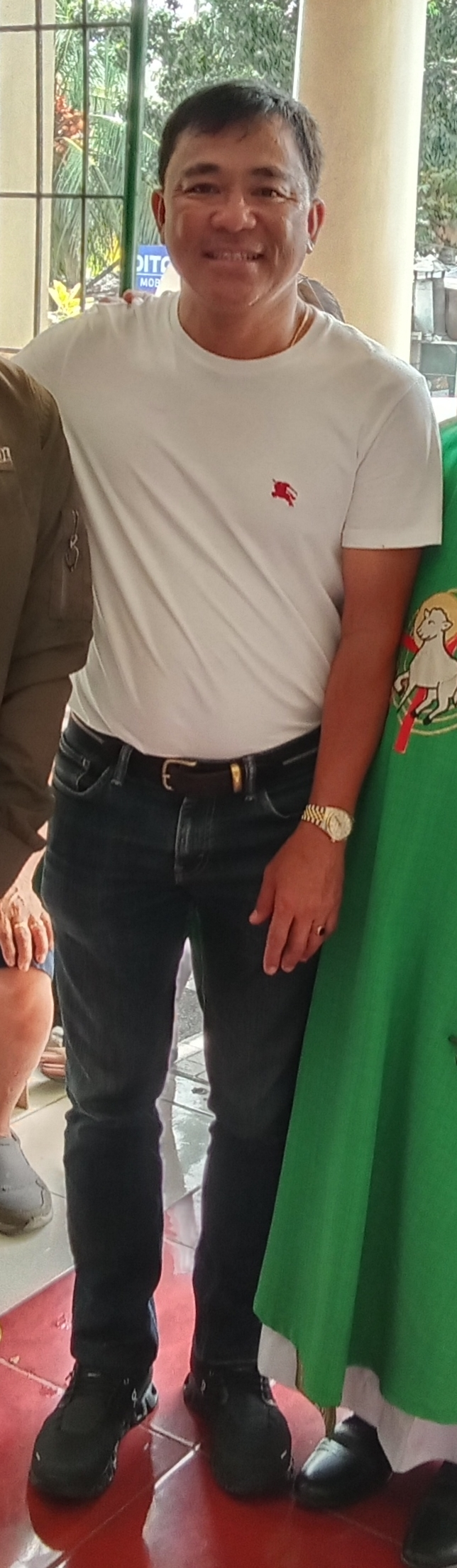
Larry Galon (in 2024), the chaplain of the Filipino Chaplaincy of the Diocese of London at St. John's Church, Notting Hill – a congregation composed of IFI and Anglican adherents.

- United Kingdom (as part of the Anglican Diocese of London Filipino Chaplaincy)

Larry Galon (chaplain)
St. John's Church, Notting Hill (base place of worship)
Lansdowne Crescent, London W11 2NN, England, United Kingdom
Organized in 2012

- Hong Kong (chaplaincy)

Dwight Q. dela Torre (chaplain)
St. John's Cathedral (base place of worship)
4 Garden Rd., Central, Hong Kong
Organized in 1994

- United Arab Emirates (community)

House church (base place of worship)
Abu Dhabi and Dubai, United Arab Emirates
Organized in 2011

- Singapore (community)

Dwight Q. dela Torre (community priest)
St. Andrew's Cathedral (base place of worship)
11 St. Andrew's Rd., Central Area, Singapore
Organized in 2014

- Germany (Deutsch [German] Seamen's Mission)

Amelito D. Bag-o II (missionary priest)
Evangelical Lutheran Church in Northern Germany (base place of worship)
Hamburg, Germany
Organized in 2002

== See also ==
- Philippine Independent Church
- List of cathedrals in the Philippines
- List of Roman Catholic dioceses in the Philippines
- Christianity in the Philippines
- Episcopal Church in the Philippines

== Sources ==
- "Parish Locations". Iglesia Filipina Independiente. Archived from the original on November 18, 2023.
