= Our Lady of Balintawak =

Marian apparition and Patroness of the Iglesia Filipina Independiente

Our Lady of Balintawak Nuestra Señora de Balintawak La Hermosa Virgen de Balintawak Mahal na Birhen ng Balintawak
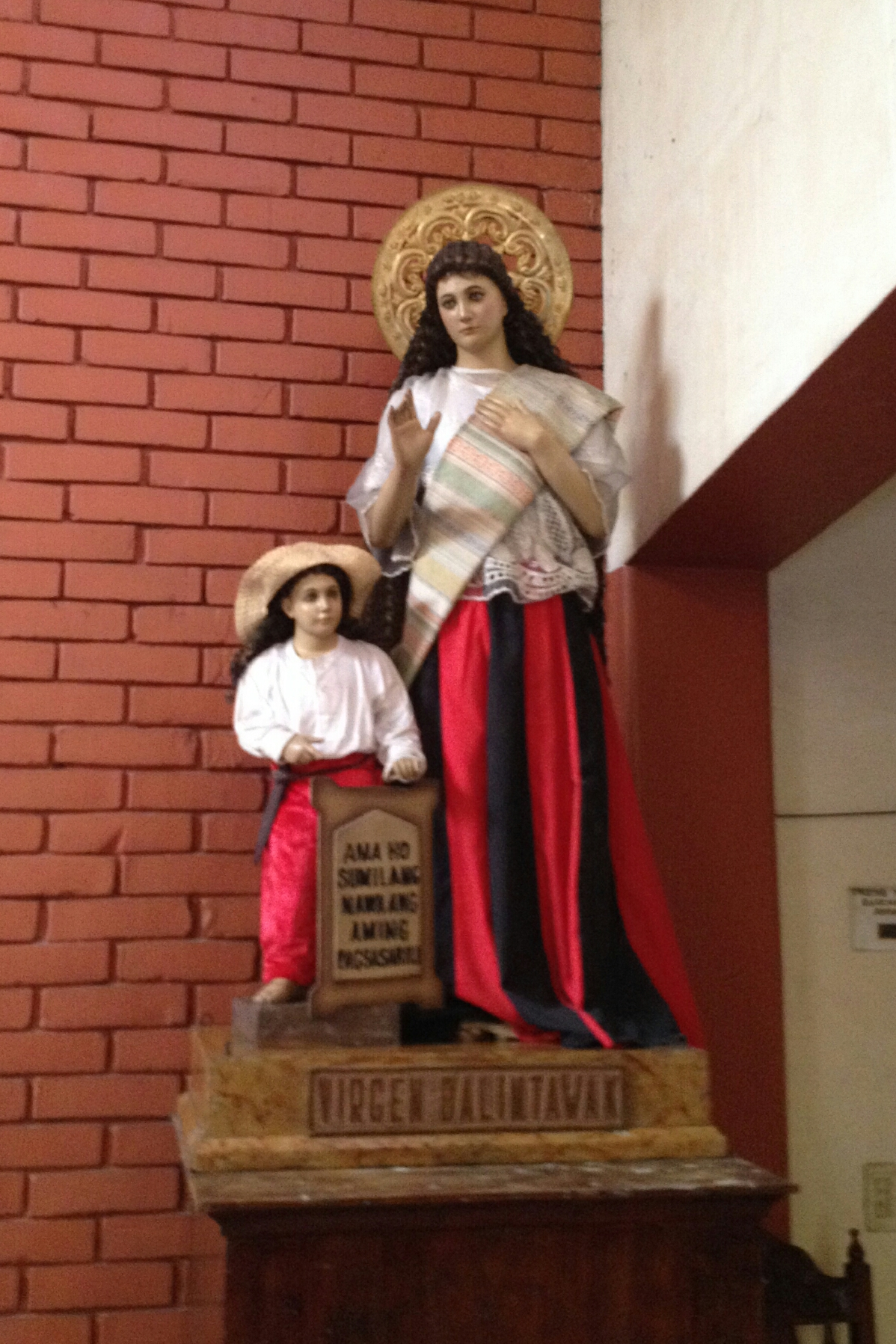
- The original image of the Our Lady of Balintawak located in María Clara Parish Church, Manila, Philippines.
- Location: Balingasa, Quezon, City, Philippines
- Date: 26 August 1896
- Witness: Katipunan soldier
- Type: Marian apparition
- Approval: 26 August 1925, Canonically granted by Obispo Máximo Gregorio Aglipay
- Venerated in: Aglipayan Church
- Shrine: Maria Clara Parish Church, 1318, Concepcion Street, Santa Cruz, Manila, Philippines
- Patronage: Iglesia Filipina Independiente (Philippine Independent Church)
- Attributes: Virgin Mary wearing a traditional Filipiniana (balintawak) dress and rosary, with the Child Jesus in Katipunan attire, bolo, and the banner stating Ama ko sumilang nawa ang aming pagsasarili ("My Father, may our independence be born")
- Feast day: 26 August

Our Lady of Balintawak (Spanish: Nuestra Señora de Balintawak, Filipino: Mahal na Birhen ng Balintawak), also known as the Virgin of Balintawak (Spanish: Virgen de Balintawak, Filipino: Birhen ng Balintawak) or Virgin Balintawak (Spanish: Virgen Balintawak, Filipino: Birhen Balintawak), is an Aglipayan title of the Blessed Virgin Mary, mother of Jesus based on the Marian apparitions reported in 1896 by a Katipunan soldier during his dream. The Virgin of Balintawak is a Marian image and icon venerated in the Philippine Independent Church, one of only two (the other the Our Lady of Maulawin) indigenous to the nationalist church that considers her as its patroness.

== History ==
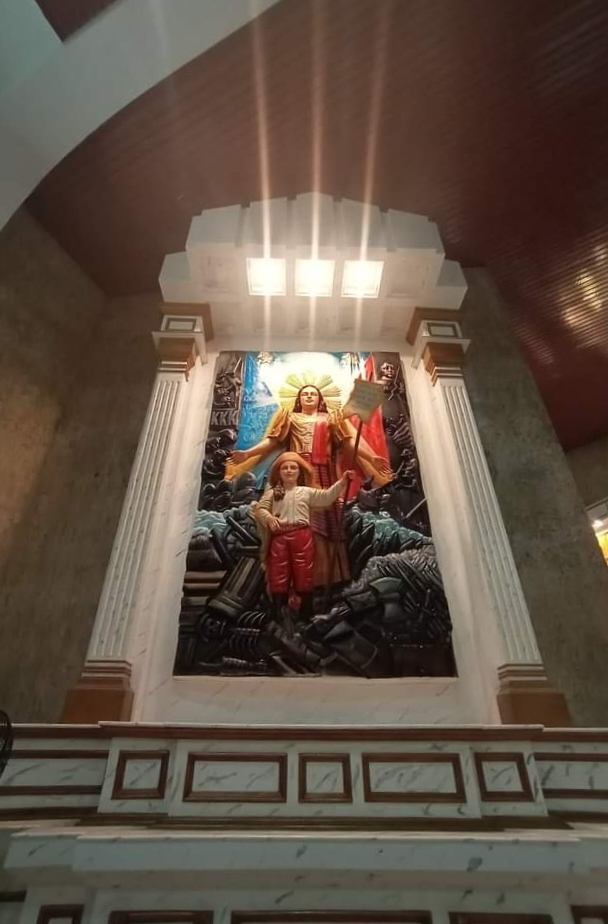
Image sculpture depicting the apparition of the icon Virgin of Balitawak displayed at the Iglesia Filipina Independiente National Cathedral of the Holy Child.

The novena of Obispo Máximo Gregorio Aglipay from 18 to 26 of August 1925 was intended to commemorate the nine-day period that marked the beginning of the Philippine Revolution (formerly known as the "Cry of Balintawak" until it was formally renamed the Cry of Pugad Lawin).

The "Pagsisiyam ng Birhen sa Balintawak" novena was based on a dream that freed Andres Bonifacio, Emilio Jacinto, Gregoria de Jesus, and other Katipuneros from the Spanish Guardia Civil's grasp. The original source is an article that was published in the pre-war journal La Vanguardia.

According to legend, Bonifacio, Jacinto, and other comrades were sleeping in Melchora Aquino's home in Balintawak. One of the Katipunan soldiers had a dream in which a beautiful mother dressed in the manner of the farmers of Balintawak (balintawak dress) was holding a pretty child by the hand and crying for freedom while wearing short red pants and shouted Kalayaan! (freedom!) The stunning lady approached the dreamer and warned him, Mag-iingat kayo (be careful).

When the dreamer awoke, he described his experience to his companions, stating that the mother and child were dressed like Filipinos but had the faces of Europeans and he narrated the message from the Blessed Virgin Mary which they took as a serious warning. They cancelled their plan to return to Manila and decided to stay put in Balintawak. Shortly, the group learned that Spanish soldiers had raided the Diario de Manila and found incriminating evidence that led to the discovery of the Katipunan. The novena later implies that the mother and child are Mary and Jesus.

According to Aglipay in regards to the Mother of Balintawak, "the voice of the people will constantly resound from our pulpits, reminding you of the great teachings of Rizal, Mabini, Bonifacio, and other Filipinos. These teachings of our greatest compatriots will form the special seal of our National Church." Additionally according to Aglipay, "she is the sacred image of our Country," and she "reminds you constantly of your sacred and inescapable duty to make every effort possible to obtain our longed-for independence."

Obispo Máximo Gregorio Aglipay said in another passage of the novena: "The Mother of Balintawak symbolizes our Country, and the Katipunan child expresses the Filipino people, the emerging generation that longs for independence, and both figures consistently remind us of the tremendous sacrifices of the liberators of our Country and of our sacred history".

Once more, Aglipay stated: "We reflect all of our innate desire for national freedom in this image of the Motherland. The only mother that can genuinely be referred to as virgin since she is free of any lust is the country, who is also known as the virgin-mother. Rizal, Mabini, Bonifacio, and other great Filipino professors, whose contemporary sapient teachings will make up the best national Gospel, serve as the People's spokesmen, prophets, and evangelists in the Katipunero movement".

Because they are a part of Philippine history and a reflection of the past, historians Reynaldo Ileto and Francis Gealogo have written essays on the Virgin of Balintawak and Infant Jesus wielding a bolo arguing that the image should be more well recognized and Filipinized until it becomes unmistakably, like the Roman Catholic version of Our Lady of Barangay.

== Veneration and the Marian image ==
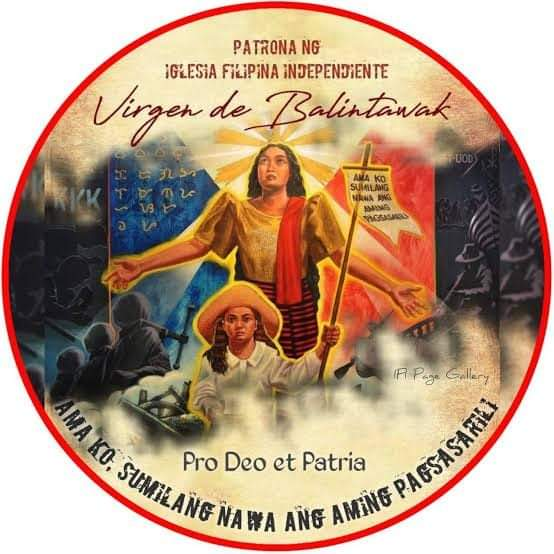
A depiction of the apparition of the Virgin of Balintawak.

The Lady of Balintawak is the first original image owned by the Philippine Independent Church and one of the two native Marian icons of the church, the other one being the Lady of Maulawin. They have no counterpart with the Roman Catholic Marian images or icons. The image was venerated in the church and is enshrined in the Maria Clara Parish Church in Manila. The feast day is celebrated every year on 26 August.

== See also ==
- Our Lady of Maulawin
- Philippine Independent Church
