= Our Lady of Maulawin =

Aglipayan title

Our Lady of Maulawin Nuestra Señora de Maulawin Virgen sa Maulawin
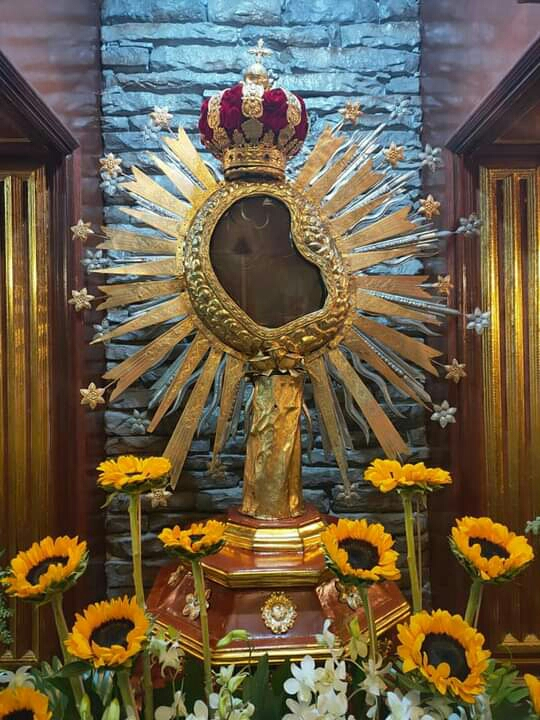
- Location: Sta. Cruz, Laguna, Philippines
- Date: June 4, 1910
- Witness: Tomás de los Santos; Hipólito Pimentel
- Type: Wooden statue
- Approval: June 4, 1911, Canonically granted by Obispo Máximo Gregorio Aglipay
- Venerated in: Iglesia Filipina Independiente
- Shrine: Cathedral of Our Lady of Maulawin, Sta. Cruz, Laguna
- Patronage: Sta. Cruz, Laguna
- Attributes: Marian imprint on Molave wood
- Feast day: June 4

Our Lady of Maulawin (Spanish: Nuestra Señora de Maulawin, Filipino: Mahal na Birhen ng Maulawin), also known as the Virgin of Maulawin (Spanish: Virgen de Maulawin) and Virgin of Molave (Spanish: Virgen de Molave), is an Aglipayan title of the Blessed Virgin Mary, mother of Jesus venerated by the Iglesia Filipina Independiente, one of only two images of the Virgin Mary (the other the Our Lady of Balintawak) to be indigenous to the nationalist church from the Philippines.

== Etymology ==
Maulawin is the Tagalog name of the hardwood species Molave (Vitex parviflora). The tree, native in Asia, Central America and South America, is valued in the Philippines for its dense, termite-resistant lumber used in construction of wooden structures and furniture.

== Origins ==
In 1921, the Novena sa Virgen Maulawin ñg Katagalugan: na pinipintakasi sa Iglesia Flipina Independiente sa Sta. Cruz, Laguna, K. T. (Kapuluang Tagalog) (“Novena to the Virgin of Mulawain of the Katagalugan: who is recognised as a patroness by the Philippine Independent Church in Santa Cruz, Laguna, Tagalog Archipelago [Philippines]”) was published by L. Reyes, and recounts a hagiography of this Marian title.

In May 1910, a group of loggers climbed Mount Sembrano on the Jalajala side to select and cut lumber for sale in Santa Cruz, Laguna. Upon inspecting it, Telesforo Cruz, to whom they had offered the log, deemed the wood not to his liking.

The group then brought the logs to Daáng Malusak (now Mabini Street), where Tomás "Tomeng" de los Santos bought the lumber, intending to build a storehouse. The wood sat unused for a year (as was customary for freshly cut timber) until June 4, 1910, when De los Santos decided to start construction with the help of carpenter Hipólito "Poleng" Pimentel.

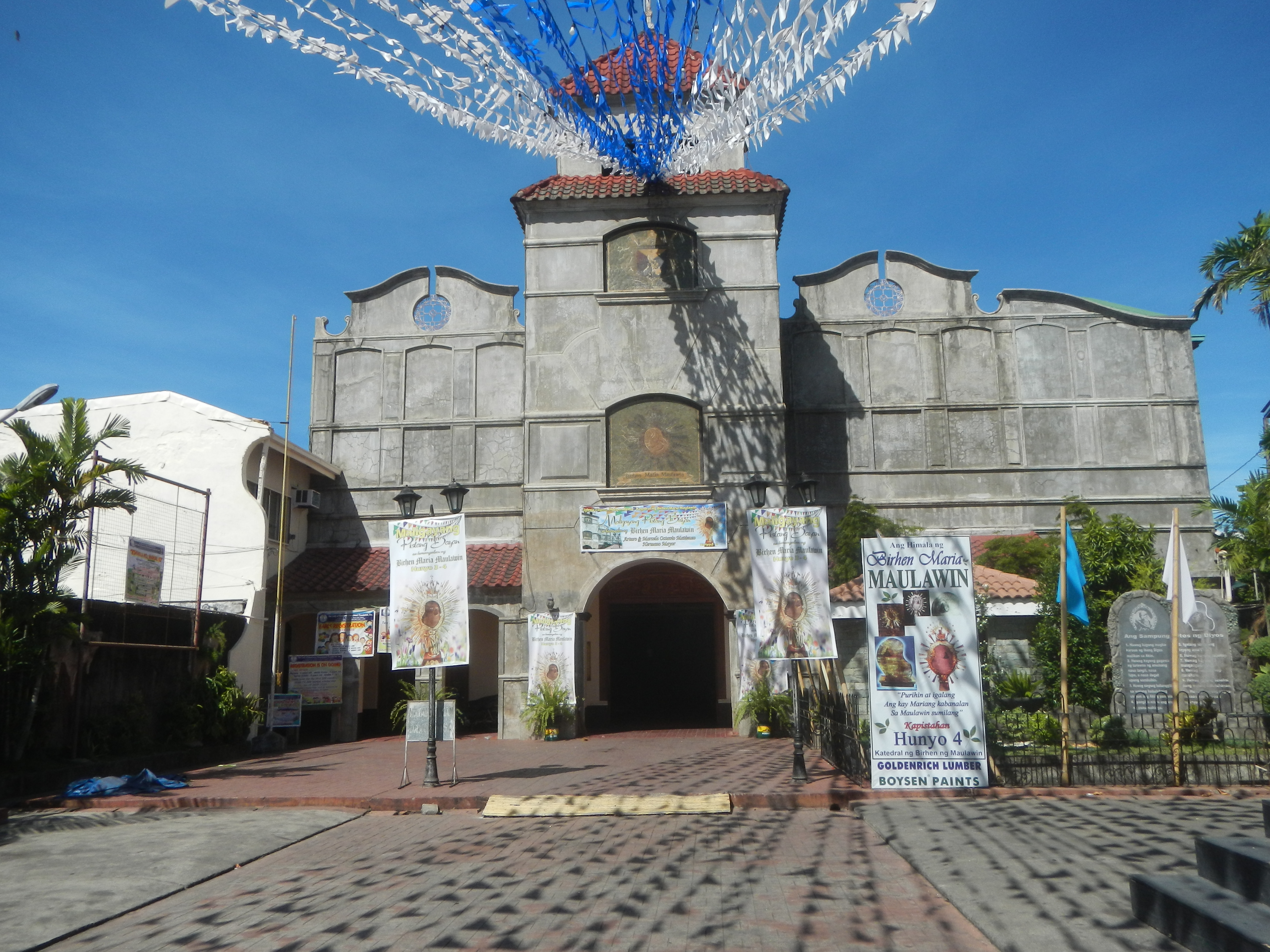
Cathedral of Our Lady of Maulawin

In preparing the wood, Pimentel sawed off a crooked piece of the log and discovered the image of Our Lady imprinted on it. Cutting more of the wood revealed more imprints. The first imprints were placed in the storehouse, which eventually became a chapel. Visitors and curious onlookers made it a pilgrimage site, hoping for miracles and healing. On the other hand, Mount Sembrano also became a Santong Lugar (“Holy place”) for Aglipayan pilgrims to remember the source of the wood.

On June 4, 1911, a year after the image’s discovery on the wood, Obispo Máximo Gregorio Aglipay said Mass in the chapel, now the Cathedral of Our Lady of Maulawin (Filipino: Katedral ng Birhen Maulawin) .

== Veneration ==
The original pieces of Molave wood with the image are venerated in a side chapel of the cathedral, which also functions as a gallery of church practices over the years. One of the pieces is also in a chapel at the Santong Lugar site on Mount Sembrano, while another can be found in the Parish of the Holy Child in Marikina.

Fluvial and foot processions are done by devotees on the images feast day, and other special occasions.

In September 2024, the cathedral was declared the Shrine of the Blessed Virgin of Maulawin by the Supreme Council of Bishops (SCB) of the Iglesia Filipina Independiente.

== See also ==
- Our Lady of Balintawak
- Philippine Independent church
