= Legislative districts of Misamis Oriental =

The legislative districts of Misamis Oriental are the representations of the province of Misamis Oriental in the various national legislatures of the Philippines. The province is currently represented in the lower house of the Congress of the Philippines through its first and second congressional districts.

Camiguin and Cagayan de Oro last formed part of its representation in 1969 and 1972, respectively.

== History ==
Prior to gaining separate representation, most areas now under the jurisdiction of Misamis Oriental were represented under the former province of Misamis (1907–1931). Exceptions are territories which were annexed in 1921 from Bukidnon and thus formed part of the representation of the Department of Mindanao and Sulu from 1917 to 1922: Napaliran (annexed to Balingasag in 1921), Claveria (became a municipality in 1950), Lourdez (distributed between Alubijid, El Salvador, Initao, Manticao and Opol in 1955) and Lumbia (distributed between Cagayan de Oro and Opol in 1954).

The approval of Act No. 3537 on November 2, 1929, split the old Misamis Province into Misamis Occidental and Misamis Oriental, and provided each successor province a separate representative in the Philippine Assembly. The new province of Misamis Oriental first elected its own representative in the 1931 elections. The province also remained part of the eleventh senatorial district which elected two out of the 24-member upper house of the Philippine Legislature when senators were still elected from territory-based districts until 1935.

During the Second World War, the Province of Misamis Oriental sent two delegates to the National Assembly of the Japanese-sponsored Second Philippine Republic: one was the provincial governor (an ex officio member), while the other was elected through a provincial assembly of KALIBAPI members during the Japanese occupation of the Philippines. Upon the restoration of the Philippine Commonwealth in 1945 the province retained its pre-war lone congressional district.

Even after receiving their own city charters, Cagayan de Oro and Gingoog remained part of the representation of the Province of Misamis Oriental by virtue of Section 90 of Republic Act No. 521 (June 15, 1950) and Section 89 of Republic Act No. 2668 (June 18, 1960), respectively.

The passage of Republic Act No. 4669 on June 18, 1966, separated the sub-province of Camiguin from Misamis Oriental and constituted it into an independent province; per Section 4 of the said law, the incumbent representative for Misamis Oriental continued representing the new province until its separate representative was elected in the November 1969 elections.

Misamis Oriental was represented in the Interim Batasang Pambansa as part of Region X from 1978 to 1984. The province returned two representatives, elected at large, to the Regular Batasang Pambansa in 1984. Cagayan de Oro separately elected its own representative starting that year.

Under the new Constitution which was proclaimed on February 11, 1987, the province was reapportioned into two congressional districts; each elected its member to the restored House of Representatives starting that same year.

== Current districts ==
Misamis Oriental's current congressional delegation is composed of two members since 1987.

Political parties

NUP (1)
Nacionalista (1)

Legislative districts and representatives of Misamis Oriental
District	Current Representative		Party	Constituent LGUs	Population (2015)	Area	Map
District	Image	Name	Party	Constituent LGUs	Population (2015)	Area	Map
1st		Karen Lagbas (since 2025); Sugbongcogon	NUP	List: Balingasag; Balingoan; Binuangan; Gingoog; Kinoguitan; Lagonglong; Magsaysay; Medina; Salay; Sugbongcogon; Talisayan	376,271	1,481.17 km²	
2nd		Yevgeny Emano (since 2022); Tagoloan	Nacionalista	List: Alubijid; Claveria; El Salvador; Gitagum; Initao; Jasaan; Laguindingan; Libertad; Lugait; Manticao; Naawan; Opol; Tagoloan; Villanueva	512,238	1,650.35 km²	

== Historical districts ==
=== 1931–1969 ===
- includes the cities of Cagayan de Oro (chartered 1950) and Gingoog (chartered 1960), and the sub-province of Camiguin (established 1957)

Period	Representative
9th Philippine Legislature; 1931–1934	Isidro Vamenta
10th Philippine Legislature; 1934–1935	Segundo Gastón
1st National Assembly; 1935–1938	Leon Borromeo
2nd National Assembly; 1938–1941	Isidro Vamenta
1st Commonwealth Congress; 1945	Jose Artadi
1st Congress; 1946–1949	Pedro S. Baculio
2nd Congress; 1949–1953	Emmanuel N. Pelaez
3rd Congress; 1953–1957	Ignacio S. Cruz
4th Congress; 1957–1961	Fausto Dugenio
5th Congress; 1961–1965	Vicente B. De Lara
6th Congress; 1965–1969	Emmanuel N. Pelaez (Note: Elected to the Senate in the 1967 elections; seat remained vacant until the end of the 6th Congress.)
6th Congress; 1965–1969	vacant

==== 1969–1972 ====
- includes the chartered cities of Cagayan de Oro and Gingoog

Period	Representative
7th Congress; 1969–1972	Pedro M. Roa

=== At-Large (defunct) ===
==== 1943–1944 ====
- includes the present-day province of Camiguin and the highly urbanized city of Cagayan de Oro

Period	Representatives
National Assembly; 1943–1944	Isidro Vamenta
National Assembly; 1943–1944	Jose Artadi (ex officio)

==== 1984–1986 ====
Period	Representatives
Regular Batasang Pambansa; 1984–1986	Homobono A. Adaza
Regular Batasang Pambansa; 1984–1986	Concordio C. Diel

== See also ==
- Legislative districts of Misamis
- Legislative district of Camiguin
- Legislative district of Cagayan de Oro
