= Legislative districts of Misamis =

The legislative districts of Misamis were the representations of the historical province of Misamis in the various national legislatures of the Philippines until 1931. The undivided province's representation encompassed what are now the provinces of Camiguin, Misamis Occidental and Misamis Oriental, and the highly urbanized city of Cagayan de Oro.

== History ==
Misamis was initially represented in the lower house of the Philippine Legislature through two assembly districts. When seats for the upper house of the Philippine Legislature were elected from territory-based districts between 1916 and 1935, the province formed part of the eleventh senatorial district which elected two out of the 24-member Senate.

In February 1921 the enactment of Act No. 2968 or the "Artadi Law" enlarged the province of Misamis southward with the annexation of northern areas of Bukidnon: the municipal districts of Claveria and Napaliran were annexed to Balingasag and became part of the first district; the municipal district of Lourdes (also spelled Lourdez), along with areas around the middle stretches of the Iponan and Cagayan rivers, were annexed to Cagayan de Misamis and became part of the second district. Executive Order No. 74 issued on August 22, 1927, re-constituted Claveria and Lourdes into separate municipal districts, and also created two new municipal districts: Taglimao (the area in the middle reaches of the Iponan River) and Lumbia (middle reaches of the Cagayan River).

On November 2, 1929, the Philippine Legislature approved Act No. 3537 which divided Misamis into two new provinces with effect on January 1, 1930. Per Section 6 of the said law the incumbent Misamis first district and second district assemblymen were to represent Misamis Oriental and Misamis Occidental respectively. The two successor provinces first elected their separate lower house representatives in the 1931 elections.

== 1st District (defunct) ==
=== 1907–1922 ===
- Municipalities: Balingasag, Mambajao, Tagoloan, Talisayan, Gingoog (re-established 1907), Sagay (re-established 1909), Catarman (re-established 1911), Salay (established 1919)

Period	Representative
1st Philippine Legislature; 1907–1909	Carlos Corrales
2nd Philippine Legislature; 1909–1912	Leon Borromeo
3rd Philippine Legislature; 1912–1916	Leon Borromeo
4th Philippine Legislature; 1916–1919	Gregorio Borromeo
5th Philippine Legislature; 1919–1922	Jose Artadi

=== 1922–1931 ===
- Municipalities: Balingasag, Catarman, Gingoog, Mambajao, Sagay, Salay, Tagoloan, Talisayan, Claveria (former municipal district of Bukidnon, annexed to Balingasag 1921; re-established as municipal district 1927), Napaliran (former municipal district of Bukidnon, annexed to Balingasag 1921), Quinoguitan (Kinogitan) (established 1929)

Period	Representative
6th Philippine Legislature; 1922–1925	Jose Artadi
7th Philippine Legislature; 1925–1928	Segundo Gaston
8th Philippine Legislature; 1928–1931	Silvino Maestrado

== 2nd District (defunct) ==
=== 1907–1922 ===
- Municipalities: Cagayan, Initao, Jimenez, Misamis, Oroquieta, Plaridel (Langaran), Baliangao (re-established 1910), Aloran (re-established 1916), Clarin (Loculan) (re-established 1920), Tudela (established 1920)

Period	Representative
1st Philippine Legislature; 1907–1909	Manuel Corrales
2nd Philippine Legislature; 1909–1912	Nicolas Capistrano
3rd Philippine Legislature; 1912–1916	Nicolas Capistrano
4th Philippine Legislature; 1916–1919	Ramon B. Neri
5th Philippine Legislature; 1919–1922	Fortunato U. Clavano

=== 1922–1931 ===
- Municipalities: Aloran, Baliangao, Cagayan, Clarin, Initao, Jimenez, Misamis, Oroquieta, Plaridel, Tudela, Lourdes (former municipal district of Bukidnon, annexed to Cagayan 1921; re-established as municipal district 1927), Lumbia (former unorganized territory of Bukidnon, annexed to Cagayan 1921; established as separate municipal district 1927; merged with Taglimao 1930), Taglimao (former unorganized territory of Bukidnon, annexed to Cagayan 1921; established as separate municipal district 1927; annexed to Lumbia 1930), Lopez Jaena (established 1929), Tangub (Regidor) (established 1930)

Period	Representative
6th Philippine Legislature; 1922–1925	Anselmo Bernard
7th Philippine Legislature; 1925–1928	Teogenes Velez
8th Philippine Legislature; 1928–1931	Isidro Vamenta

== See also ==
- Legislative district of Misamis Occidental
- Legislative district of Misamis Oriental
  - Legislative district of Camiguin
  - Legislative districts of Cagayan de Oro
