= Tabok =

Tabok can refer to the following places in the Philippines:

- Tabok, a barangay in the city of Mandaue
- Tabok, a barangay in the municipality of Danao, Bohol
- Tabok, a barangay in the municipality of Llorente, Eastern Samar
- Tabok, a barangay in the municipality of Hindang, Leyte
- Tabok, a barangay in the municipality of Lagonglong, Misamis Oriental
