= Misamis Oriental's 1st congressional district =

Legislative district of the Philippines

- Constituency for the House of Representatives of the Philippines
- Location of Misamis Oriental within the Philippines
- Province: Misamis Oriental
- Region: Northern Mindanao
- Population: 376,271 (2015)
- Electorate: 274,450 (2019)
- Major settlements: 11 LGUs: Cities; Gingoog; Municipalities; Balingasag; Balingoan; Binuangan; Kinoguitan; Lagonglong; Magsaysay; Medina; Salay; Sugbongcogon; Talisayan
- Area: 1,481.17 km^{2} (571.88 sq mi)

Current constituency
- Created: 1987
- Representative: Karen Lagbas
- Political party: NUP
- Congressional bloc: Majority

Misamis Oriental's 1st congressional district is one of the two congressional districts of the Philippines in the province of Misamis Oriental. It has been represented in the House of Representatives since 1987. The district encompasses the eastern half of the province consisting of the city of Gingoog and the municipalities of Balingasag, Balingoan, Binuangan, Kinoguitan, Lagonglong, Magsaysay, Medina, Salay, Sugbongcogon and Talisayan. It is currently represented in the 20th Congress by Karen Lagbas of the National Unity Party (NUP).

== Representation history ==
#	Image	Member	Term of office		Congress	Party	Electoral history	Constituent LGUs
#	Image	Member	Start	End	Congress	Party	Electoral history	Constituent LGUs
=== Misamis Oriental's 1st district for the House of Representatives of the Philippines ===
District created February 2, 1987 from Misamis Oriental's at-large district.
1		Isacio A. Pelaez	June 30, 1987	June 30, 1992	8th	PDP–Laban	Elected in 1987.	1987–present Balingasag, Balingoan, Binuangan, Gingoog, Kinoguitan, Lagonglong, Magsaysay, Medina, Salay, Sugbongcogon, Talisayan
2		Homobono T. Cezar	June 30, 1992	June 30, 1998	9th	Lakas–CMD	Elected in 1992.	1987–present Balingasag, Balingoan, Binuangan, Gingoog, Kinoguitan, Lagonglong, Magsaysay, Medina, Salay, Sugbongcogon, Talisayan
2		Homobono T. Cezar	June 30, 1992	June 30, 1998	10th	Lakas–CMD	Re-elected in 1995.	1987–present Balingasag, Balingoan, Binuangan, Gingoog, Kinoguitan, Lagonglong, Magsaysay, Medina, Salay, Sugbongcogon, Talisayan
3		Oscar Moreno	June 30, 1998	June 30, 2004	11th	Lakas–CMD	Elected in 1998.	1987–present Balingasag, Balingoan, Binuangan, Gingoog, Kinoguitan, Lagonglong, Magsaysay, Medina, Salay, Sugbongcogon, Talisayan
3		Oscar Moreno	June 30, 1998	June 30, 2004	12th	Lakas–CMD	Re-elected in 2001.	1987–present Balingasag, Balingoan, Binuangan, Gingoog, Kinoguitan, Lagonglong, Magsaysay, Medina, Salay, Sugbongcogon, Talisayan
4		Danilo Lagbas	June 30, 2004	June 8, 2008	13th	KNP	Elected in 2004.	1987–present Balingasag, Balingoan, Binuangan, Gingoog, Kinoguitan, Lagonglong, Magsaysay, Medina, Salay, Sugbongcogon, Talisayan
4		Danilo Lagbas	June 30, 2004	June 8, 2008	14th	Lakas–CMD	Re-elected in 2007. Died in office.	1987–present Balingasag, Balingoan, Binuangan, Gingoog, Kinoguitan, Lagonglong, Magsaysay, Medina, Salay, Sugbongcogon, Talisayan
—	vacant		June 8, 2008	June 30, 2010	14th	—	No special election held to fill vacancy.	1987–present Balingasag, Balingoan, Binuangan, Gingoog, Kinoguitan, Lagonglong, Magsaysay, Medina, Salay, Sugbongcogon, Talisayan
5		Peter Unabia	June 30, 2010	June 30, 2019	15th	Liberal	Elected in 2010.	1987–present Balingasag, Balingoan, Binuangan, Gingoog, Kinoguitan, Lagonglong, Magsaysay, Medina, Salay, Sugbongcogon, Talisayan
5		Peter Unabia	June 30, 2010	June 30, 2019	16th	Liberal	Re-elected in 2013.	1987–present Balingasag, Balingoan, Binuangan, Gingoog, Kinoguitan, Lagonglong, Magsaysay, Medina, Salay, Sugbongcogon, Talisayan
5		Peter Unabia	June 30, 2010	June 30, 2019	17th	PDP–Laban	Re-elected in 2016.	1987–present Balingasag, Balingoan, Binuangan, Gingoog, Kinoguitan, Lagonglong, Magsaysay, Medina, Salay, Sugbongcogon, Talisayan
6		Christian Unabia	June 30, 2019	June 30, 2025	18th	Lakas–CMD	Elected in 2019.	1987–present Balingasag, Balingoan, Binuangan, Gingoog, Kinoguitan, Lagonglong, Magsaysay, Medina, Salay, Sugbongcogon, Talisayan
6		Christian Unabia	June 30, 2019	June 30, 2025	19th	Lakas–CMD	Re-elected in 2022.	1987–present Balingasag, Balingoan, Binuangan, Gingoog, Kinoguitan, Lagonglong, Magsaysay, Medina, Salay, Sugbongcogon, Talisayan
7		Karen Lagbas	June 30, 2025	Incumbent	20th	NUP	Elected in 2025.	1987–present Balingasag, Balingoan, Binuangan, Gingoog, Kinoguitan, Lagonglong, Magsaysay, Medina, Salay, Sugbongcogon, Talisayan

== Election results ==
=== 2025 ===
Candidate	Party	Votes	%
Karen Lagbas	National Unity Party	140,549	55.49
Christian Unabia (incumbent)	Lakas–CMD	112,758	44.51
Total		253,307	100.00
Valid votes		253,307	95.17
Invalid/blank votes		12,846	4.83
Total votes		266,153	100.00
Registered voters/turnout		300,911	88.45
National Unity Party gain from Lakas–CMD			
Source: Commission on Elections

=== 2022 ===
Candidate	Party	Votes	%
Christian Unabia (incumbent)	Lakas–CMD	114,936	51.04
Karen Lagbas	National Unity Party	105,875	47.02
Jerry Khu	Katipunan ng Nagkakaisang Pilipino	4,370	1.94
Total		225,181	100.00
Total votes		252,300	–
Registered voters/turnout		289,032	87.29
Lakas–CMD hold			
Source: Commission on Elections

=== 2016 ===
2016 Philippine House of Representatives elections
Party	Candidate	Votes	%
Liberal	Peter Unabia	117,027	70.12%
Padayun Misamis	Rey Moreno	48,367	28.98%
LM	Rommel Zagado	1,495	0.89%
Total votes		166,889	100.00%

=== 2013 ===
2013 Philippine House of Representatives elections
Party	Candidate	Votes	%	±%
Independent	Henry Clyde C. Abott			
Liberal	Peter Unabia			
LM	Rommel S. Zagada			
Margin of victory				
Rejected ballots				
Turnout				
Liberal hold		Swing		

=== 2010 ===
Candidate	Party	Votes	%
Peter Unabia	Pwersa ng Masang Pilipino	61,321	39.79
Genaro Jose Moreno Jr.	Lakas–Kampi–CMD	47,668	30.93
Jennifer Lagbas	Liberal Party	43,389	28.16
Wevino Palamine	Independent	1,355	0.88
Rommel Zagado	Kilusang Bagong Lipunan	362	0.23
Total		154,095	100.00
Valid votes		154,095	88.29
Invalid/blank votes		20,443	11.71
Total votes		174,538	100.00
Pwersa ng Masang Pilipino gain from Lakas–Kampi–CMD			
Source: Commission on Elections

== See also ==
- Legislative districts of Misamis Oriental
