= Legislative districts of Cagayan de Oro =

Legislative district of the Philippines

Cagayan de Oro divided into 1st and 2nd District

The legislative districts of Cagayan de Oro are the representations of the highly urbanized city of Cagayan de Oro in the various national legislatures of the Philippines. The city is currently represented in the lower house of the Congress of the Philippines through its first and second congressional districts.

== History ==
Prior to gaining separate representation, areas now under the jurisdiction of Cagayan de Oro were represented under the historical Misamis Province (1907–1931), Misamis Oriental (1931–1969) and Region X (1978–1984).

By virtue of being classified as a highly urbanized city on November 22, 1983, Cagayan de Oro was granted separate representation for the first time in the Regular Batasang Pambansa, electing one representative, at large, in 1984.

Under the new Constitution which was proclaimed on February 11, 1987, the city constituted a lone congressional district, and elected its member to the restored House of Representatives starting that same year.

The passage of Republic Act No. 9371 on February 22, 2007 increased the city's representation by reapportioning it into two congressional districts: barangays west of the Cagayan de Oro River were constituted into the first district, and those lying east of the river, the second. The districts elected their separate representatives starting in that year's elections.

== Current districts ==
Cagayan de Oro's current congressional delegation is composed of two members.

Political parties

PFP (1)
CDP (1)

Legislative districts and representatives of Cagayan de Oro
District	Current Representative		Party	Constituent LGUs	Population (2020)	Area
District	Image	Name	Party	Constituent LGUs	Population (2020)	Area
1st		Lordan Suan (since 2022); Carmen	PFP	List: Baikingon; Balulang; Bayabas; Bayanga; Besigan; Bonbon; Bulua; Calaanan; Canitoan; Carmen; Dansolihon; Iponan; Kauswagan; Lumbia; Mambuaya; Pagalungan; Pagatpat; Patag; Pigsag-an; San Simon; Taglimao; Tagpangi; Tignapoloan; Tuburan; Tumpagon	383,945	377.81 km²
2nd		Rufus Rodriguez (since 2019); Nazareth	CDP	List: Barangays 1–40 (City Proper); Agusan; Balubal; Bugo; Camaman-an; Consolacion; Cugman; F.S. Catanico; Gusa; Indahag; Lapasan (Agora); Macabalan; Macasandig; Nazareth; Puerto; Puntod; Tablon	342,474	123.50 km²

== Historical districts ==
=== Lone District (defunct) ===
Period	Representative
8th Congress; 1987–1992	Benedicta B. Roa
9th Congress; 1992–1995	Erasmo B. Damasing
10th Congress; 1995–1998	Erasmo B. Damasing
11th Congress; 1998–2001	Constantino G. Jaraula
12th Congress; 2001–2004	Constantino G. Jaraula
13th Congress; 2004–2007	Constantino G. Jaraula

=== At-Large (defunct) ===
Period	Representative
Regular Batasang Pambansa; 1984–1986	Aquilino Pimentel, Jr.

== See also ==
- Legislative districts of Misamis
- Legislative districts of Misamis Oriental
