= Balingoan =

Municipality in Misamis Oriental, Philippines

- Municipality
- Municipality of Balingoan
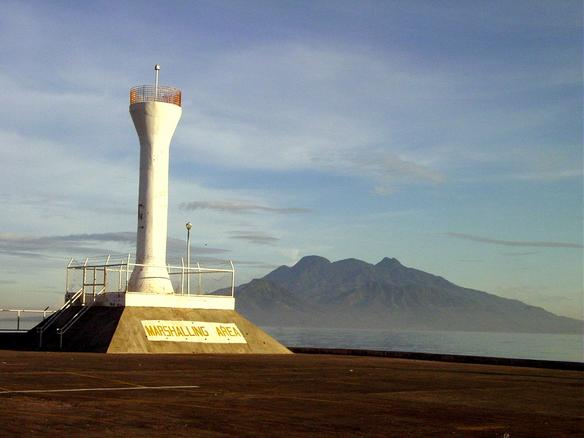
- Balingoan pier with Camiguin in the background

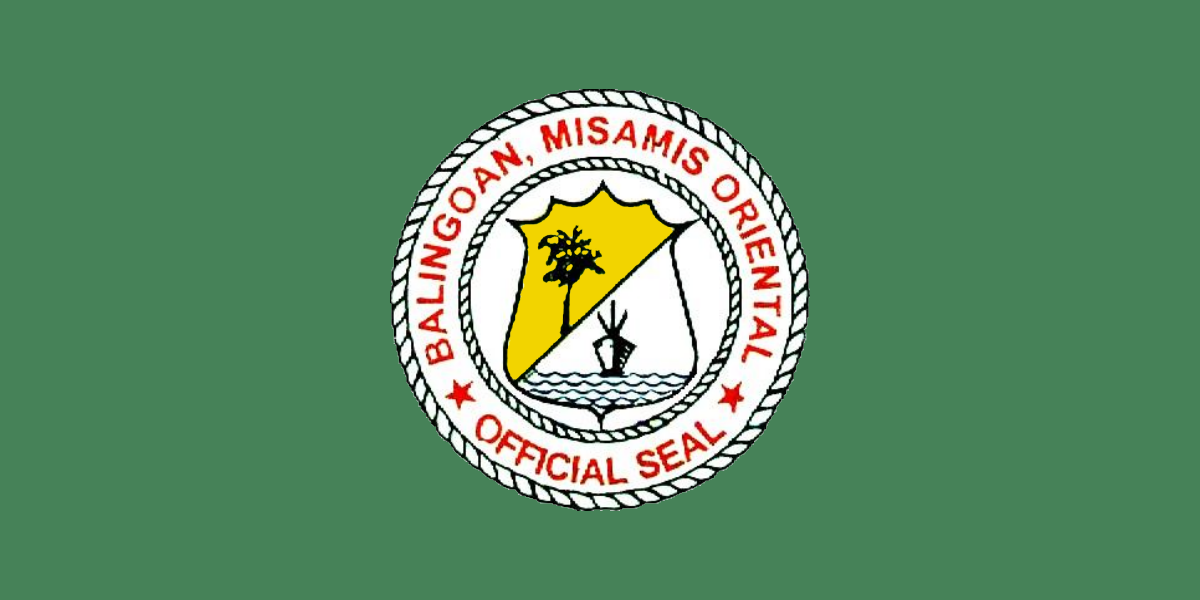
- Flag

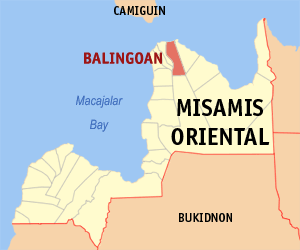
- Map of Misamis Oriental with Balingoan highlighted
- Interactive map of Balingoan
- Location within the Philippines
- Coordinates: 9°00′N 124°51′E
- Country: Philippines
- Region: Northern Mindanao
- Province: Misamis Oriental
- District: 1st district
- Founded: March 1, 1952
- Barangays: 9 (see Barangays)

Government
  - Type: Sangguniang Bayan
  - Mayor: Aaron Paul S. Unabia
  - Vice Mayor: Franklin C. Panulaya
  - Representative: Christian S. Unabia
  - Municipal Council: Members: Jhon Eliezer Q. Padillo; Roberto M. Corrales Jr.; Richard P. Gepte; Agosto C. Mercado; Joel L. Torremoro; Rogelio P. Budlao; Ronie O. Panulaya; Erlando S. Santos Jr.
  - Electorate: 9,241 voters (2025)

Area
  - Total: 57.80 km^{2} (22.32 sq mi)
- Elevation: 84 m (276 ft)
- Highest elevation: 489 m (1,604 ft)
- Lowest elevation: 0 m (0 ft)

Population (2024 census)
  - Total: 11,896
  - Density: 205.8/km^{2} (533.1/sq mi)
  - Households: 2,585

Economy
  - Income class: 4th municipal income class
  - Poverty incidence: 20.78% (2023)
  - Revenue: ₱ 99.46 million (2024)
  - Assets: ₱ 282.9 million (2024)
  - Expenditure: ₱ 89.28 million (2024)
  - Liabilities: ₱ 36.44 million (2024)

Service provider
  - Electricity: Misamis Oriental 2 Rural Electric Cooperative (MORESCO 2)
- Time zone: UTC+8 (PST)
- ZIP code: 9011
- PSGC: 1004303000
- IDD : area code: +63 (0)88
- Native languages: Cebuano; Binukid; Subanon; Tagalog
- Website: www.balingoanmisor.gov.ph

Balingoan, officially the Municipality of Balingoan (Cebuano: Lungsod sa Balingoan; Tagalog: Bayan ng Balingoan), is a municipality in the province of Misamis Oriental, Philippines. According to the 2024 census, it has a population of 11,896 people.

== History ==
Formerly part of Talisayan, it gained independence on March 1, 1952. According to the local legend, it derived its name from the word "baling ni juan" (John's Fishing Net), which later on became simply as "Balingoan".

== Geography ==
=== Barangays ===
Balingoan is politically subdivided into 9 barangays. Each barangay consists of puroks while some have sitios.

- Baukbauk (Poblacion)
- Dahilig
- Kabangasan
- Kabulakan
- Kauswagan
- Lapinig (Poblacion)
- Mantangale
- Mapua
- San Alonzo

=== Climate ===
Climate data for Balingoan, Misamis Oriental
| Month | Jan | Feb | Mar | Apr | May | Jun | Jul | Aug | Sep | Oct | Nov | Dec | Year |
|---|---|---|---|---|---|---|---|---|---|---|---|---|---|
| Mean daily maximum °C (°F) | 28 (82) | 28 (82) | 29 (84) | 30 (86) | 30 (86) | 30 (86) | 30 (86) | 30 (86) | 30 (86) | 29 (84) | 29 (84) | 28 (82) | 29 (85) |
| Mean daily minimum °C (°F) | 23 (73) | 23 (73) | 23 (73) | 23 (73) | 25 (77) | 25 (77) | 25 (77) | 25 (77) | 25 (77) | 25 (77) | 24 (75) | 24 (75) | 24 (75) |
| Average precipitation mm (inches) | 327 (12.9) | 254 (10.0) | 185 (7.3) | 128 (5.0) | 215 (8.5) | 273 (10.7) | 248 (9.8) | 243 (9.6) | 214 (8.4) | 246 (9.7) | 271 (10.7) | 271 (10.7) | 2,875 (113.3) |
| Average rainy days | 24.3 | 21.1 | 22.5 | 20.6 | 28.3 | 28.8 | 29.4 | 29.0 | 28.0 | 28.3 | 26.0 | 24.2 | 310.5 |
Source: Meteoblue

== Demographics ==
Population census of Balingoan

| Year | Pop. | ±% p.a. |
|---|---|---|
| 1960 | 6,136 | — |
| 1970 | 5,821 | −0.53% |
| 1975 | 5,838 | +0.06% |
| 1980 | 6,596 | +2.47% |
| 1990 | 6,689 | +0.14% |
| 1995 | 7,548 | +2.29% |

| Year | Pop. | ±% p.a. |
|---|---|---|
| 2000 | 8,197 | +1.78% |
| 2007 | 9,021 | +1.33% |
| 2010 | 10,175 | +4.48% |
| 2015 | 11,051 | +1.59% |
| 2020 | 11,020 | −0.06% |
| 2024 | 11,896 | +1.85% |

Source: Philippine Statistics Authority

In the 2024 census, the population of Balingoan was 11,896 people, with a density of 210 inhabitants per square kilometre or 540 inhabitants per square mile.

== Economy ==
Poverty incidence of Balingoan

Source: Philippine Statistics Authority

Produce: Copra, fish, sea shells, fruits, vegetables, animal meat, and dairy products.

== Culture ==
Feast day: May 29. Patron Saint: San Alonzo de Rodriguez

== Transportation ==
Port of Balingoan is the main port for travellers going to the provincial island of Camiguin. From Cagayan de Oro to Balingoan is about 86 kilometres (53 mi) and would take around 1.5 hours bus ride as well as from Butuan.

== Education ==
There are 9 Public Elementary Schools situated in Barangays San Alonzo, Bauk-bauk, Lapinig, Mantangale, Mapua, Kauswagan, Kabulakan, Dahilig and Kabangasan.
