= Binuangan =

Municipality in Misamis Oriental, Philippines

- Municipality
- Municipality of Binuangan
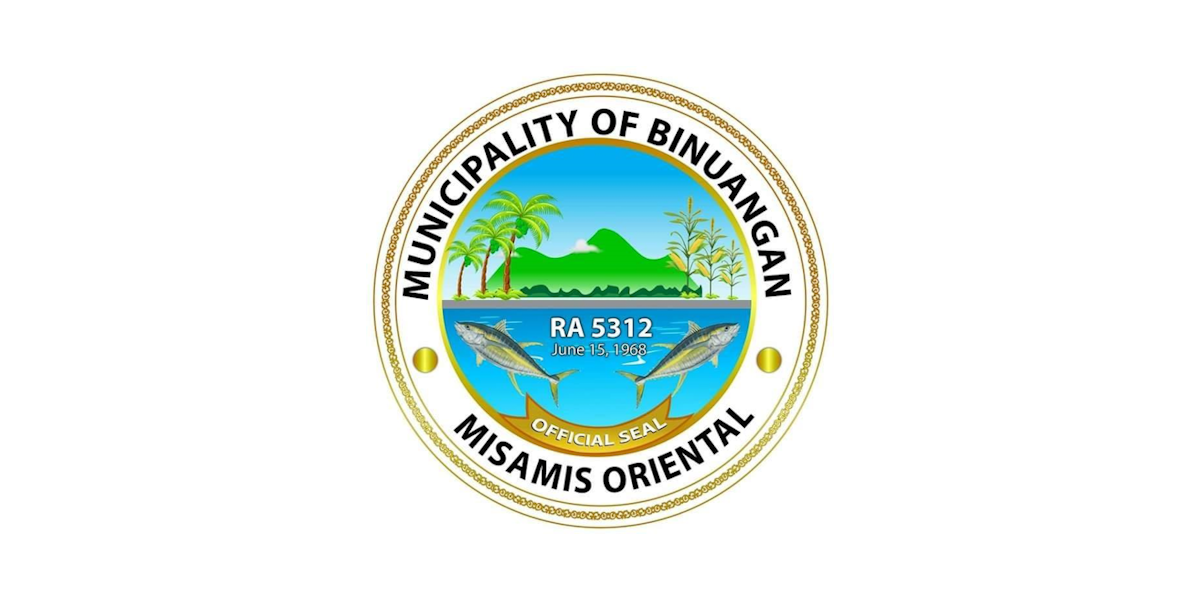
- Flag

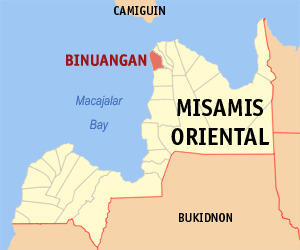
- Map of Misamis Oriental with Binuangan highlighted
- Interactive map of Binuangan
- Location within the Philippines
- Coordinates: 8°55′N 124°48′E
- Country: Philippines
- Region: Northern Mindanao
- Province: Misamis Oriental
- District: 1st district
- Founded: June 15, 1968
- Barangays: 8 (see Barangays)

Government
  - Type: Sangguniang Bayan
  - Mayor: Dann Isaiah D. Lusterio
  - Vice Mayor: Michelle C. Abao
  - Representative: Christian S. Unabia
  - Municipal Council: Members: Elvie D. Ty; Delaila C. Kho; Rene D. Nahial; Nelsi C. Dagcuta; Ricky A. Chua; Brayan P. Pabellan; Andres R. De la Cera; Renato Y. Abao
  - Electorate: 7,590 voters (2025)

Area
  - Total: 30.43 km^{2} (11.75 sq mi)
- Elevation: 143 m (469 ft)

Population (2024 census)
  - Total: 8,293
  - Density: 272.5/km^{2} (705.8/sq mi)
  - Households: 1,789

Economy
  - Income class: 5th municipal income class
  - Poverty incidence: 27.06% (2023)
  - Revenue: ₱ 82.2 million (2024)
  - Assets: ₱ 278 million (2024)
  - Expenditure: ₱ 78.47 million (2024)
  - Liabilities: ₱ 61.77 million (2024)

Service provider
  - Electricity: Misamis Oriental 2 Rural Electric Cooperative (MORESCO 2)
- Time zone: UTC+8 (PST)
- ZIP code: 9008
- PSGC: 1004304000
- IDD : area code: +63 (0)88
- Native languages: Cebuano; Binukid; Subanon; Tagalog
- Website: www.binuanganmisor.gov.ph

Binuangan, officially the Municipality of Binuangan (Cebuano: Lungsod sa Binuangan; Tagalog: Bayan ng Binuangan), is a municipality in the province of Misamis Oriental, Philippines. According to the 2024 census, it has a population of 8,293 people, making it the least populated municipality in the province.

== Geography ==
=== Barangays ===
Binuangan is politically subdivided into 8 barangays. Each barangay consists of puroks while some have sitios.

- Dampias
- Kitamban
- Kitambis
- Mabini
- Mosangot
- Nabataan
- Poblacion
- Valdeconcha

=== Climate ===
Climate data for Binuangan, Misamis Oriental
Month	Jan	Feb	Mar	Apr	May	Jun	Jul	Aug	Sep	Oct	Nov	Dec	Year
Mean daily maximum °C (°F)	27 (81)	28 (82)	28 (82)	30 (86)	30 (86)	29 (84)	29 (84)	29 (84)	29 (84)	29 (84)	28 (82)	28 (82)	29 (83)
Mean daily minimum °C (°F)	23 (73)	23 (73)	22 (72)	23 (73)	24 (75)	25 (77)	25 (77)	25 (77)	25 (77)	24 (75)	24 (75)	24 (75)	24 (75)
Average precipitation mm (inches)	327 (12.9)	254 (10.0)	185 (7.3)	128 (5.0)	215 (8.5)	273 (10.7)	248 (9.8)	243 (9.6)	214 (8.4)	246 (9.7)	271 (10.7)	271 (10.7)	2,875 (113.3)
Average rainy days	24.3	21.1	22.5	20.6	28.3	28.8	29.4	29.0	28.0	28.3	26.0	24.2	310.5
Source: Meteoblue

== Demographics ==
Population census of Binuangan

Year	Pop.	±% p.a.
1970	4,045	—
1975	3,909	−0.68%
1980	4,457	+2.66%
1990	5,090	+1.34%
1995	5,374	+1.02%
2000	5,924	+2.11%

Year	Pop.	±% p.a.
2007	6,568	+1.43%
2010	6,765	+1.08%
2015	7,515	+2.02%
2020	7,441	−0.21%
2024	8,293	+2.64%

Source: Philippine Statistics Authority

In the 2024 census, the population of Binuangan was 8,293 people, with a density of 270 inhabitants per square kilometre or 700 inhabitants per square mile.

== Economy ==
Poverty incidence of Binuangan (%)

Source: Philippine Statistics Authority
