= Magsaysay, Misamis Oriental =

Municipality in Misamis Oriental, Philippines

Magsaysay Linugos
- Municipality
- Municipality of Magsaysay
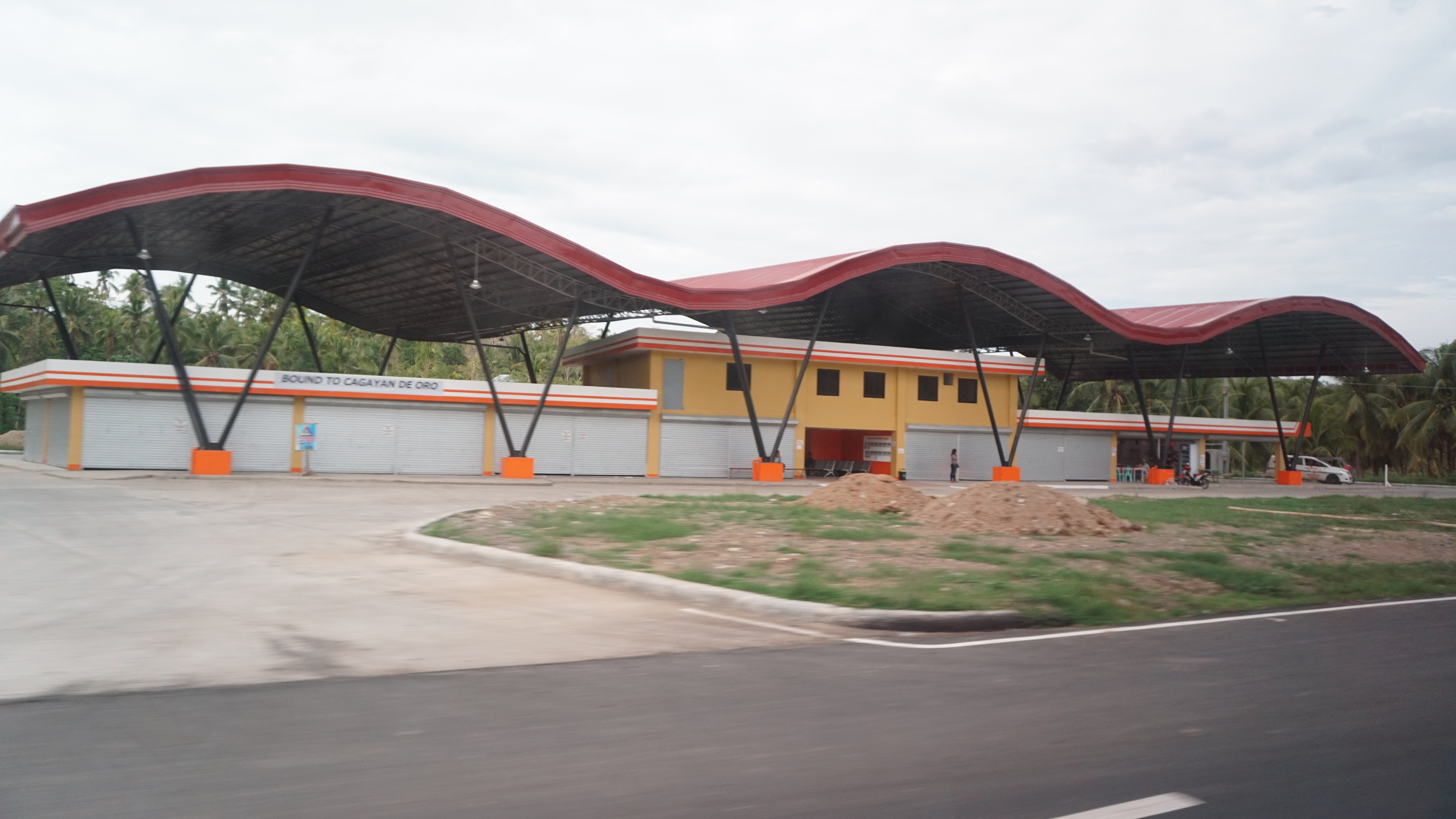
- Magsaysay Municipal Public Bus Terminal

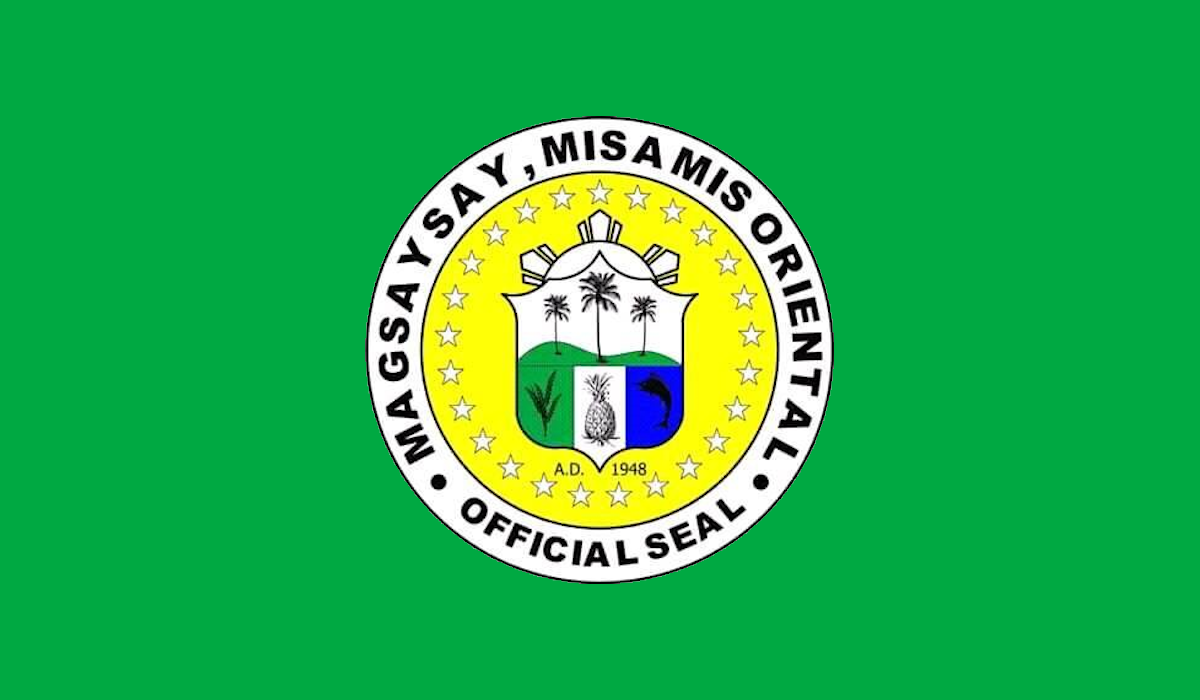
- Flag

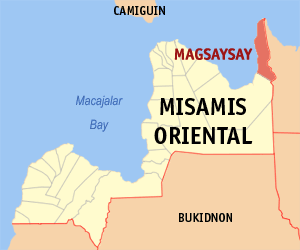
- Map of Misamis Oriental with Magsaysay highlighted
- Interactive map of Magsaysay
- Location within the Philippines
- Coordinates: 9°01′N 125°11′E
- Country: Philippines
- Region: Northern Mindanao
- Province: Misamis Oriental
- District: 1st district
- Founded: July 1, 1948
- Named for: Ramon Magsaysay
- Barangays: 13 (see Barangays)

Government
  - Type: Sangguniang Bayan
  - Mayor: Charlie B. Buhisan(Lakas-CMD)
  - Vice Mayor: Bernando B. Buhisan(NP)
  - Representative: Atty. Karen Lagbas(NUP)
  - Municipal Council: Members: Johnnylou F. Roxas; Django Gerona; Bendijo Bimbo; Shalako L. Uba; Lijun C. Mendoza; Rave Del Amor M. Deloso; Mario C. Betonio; Ariel G. Gamil
  - Electorate: 24,662 voters (2025)

Area
  - Total: 143.14 km^{2} (55.27 sq mi)
- Elevation: 38 m (125 ft)
- Highest elevation: 298 m (978 ft)
- Lowest elevation: 0 m (0 ft)

Population (2024 census)
  - Total: 37,084
  - Density: 259.08/km^{2} (671.00/sq mi)
  - Households: 8,046

Economy
  - Income class: 2nd municipal income class
  - Poverty incidence: 35.7% (2023)
  - Revenue: ₱ 189.5 million (2024)
  - Assets: ₱ 569.2 million (2024)
  - Expenditure: ₱ 226.8 million (2024)
  - Liabilities: ₱ 175.8 million (2024)

Service provider
  - Electricity: Misamis Oriental 2 Rural Electric Cooperative (MORESCO 2)
- Time zone: UTC+8 (PST)
- ZIP code: 9015
- PSGC: 1004317000
- IDD : area code: +63 (0)88
- Native languages: Cebuano; Binukid; Subanon; Tagalog
- Website: sikatmagsaysay.gov.ph

Magsaysay, officially the Municipality of Magsaysay (Cebuano: Lungsod sa Magsaysay; Tagalog: Bayan ng Magsaysay), is a municipality in the province of Misamis Oriental, Philippines. According to the 2020 census, it has a population of 36,803 people.

Magsaysay was formerly known as Linugos. It acquired its current name in 1957.

== Geography ==
=== Barangays ===
Magsaysay is politically subdivided into 25 barangays. Each barangay consists of puroks while some have sitios.

- Abunda
- Artadi
- Bonifacio Aquiño
- Cabalawan
- Cabantian
- Cabubuhan
- Candiis
- Consuelo
- Damayuhan
- Gumabon
- Katipunan
- Kauswagan
- Kibungsod
- Mahayahay
- Mindulao
- Pag-asa
- Poblacion
- San Isidro
- San Vicente
- Santa Cruz
- Tama
- Tibon-tibon
- Tinaan
- Tulang (Cadena de Amor)
- Villa Felipa

=== Climate ===
Climate data for Magsaysay, Misamis Oriental
Month	Jan	Feb	Mar	Apr	May	Jun	Jul	Aug	Sep	Oct	Nov	Dec	Year
Mean daily maximum °C (°F)	28 (82)	28 (82)	29 (84)	30 (86)	30 (86)	30 (86)	30 (86)	30 (86)	30 (86)	29 (84)	29 (84)	28 (82)	29 (85)
Mean daily minimum °C (°F)	23 (73)	23 (73)	23 (73)	23 (73)	25 (77)	25 (77)	25 (77)	25 (77)	25 (77)	25 (77)	24 (75)	24 (75)	24 (75)
Average precipitation mm (inches)	327 (12.9)	254 (10.0)	185 (7.3)	128 (5.0)	215 (8.5)	273 (10.7)	248 (9.8)	243 (9.6)	214 (8.4)	246 (9.7)	271 (10.7)	271 (10.7)	2,875 (113.3)
Average rainy days	24.3	21.1	22.5	20.6	28.3	28.8	29.4	29.0	28.0	28.3	26.0	24.2	310.5
Source: Meteoblue

== Demographics ==
Population census of Magsaysay

Year	Pop.	±% p.a.
1948	8,976	—
1960	10,893	+1.63%
1970	19,194	+5.82%
1975	21,782	+2.57%
1980	22,830	+0.94%
1990	22,099	−0.32%
1995	23,730	+1.34%

Year	Pop.	±% p.a.
2000	24,550	+0.73%
2007	28,747	+2.20%
2010	33,047	+5.20%
2015	34,605	+0.88%
2020	36,803	+1.30%
2024	37,084	+0.18%

Source: Philippine Statistics Authority

In the 2024 census, the population of Magsaysay was 37,084 people, with a density of 260 inhabitants per square kilometre or 670 inhabitants per square mile.

== Economy ==
Poverty incidence of Magsaysay (%)

Source: Philippine Statistics Authority

== Tourism ==
The Divine Mercy Monument was built December 2018 at the top of the hill in the barangay of Kibungsod and was inaugurated and blessed. It is the second monument of the province 10 years after the inauguration of Divine Mercy Shrine in El Salvador, Misamis Oriental since 2008.

== See also ==
- List of renamed cities and municipalities in the Philippines
