= Lagonglong =

Municipality in Misamis Oriental, Philippines

- Municipality
- Municipality of Lagonglong
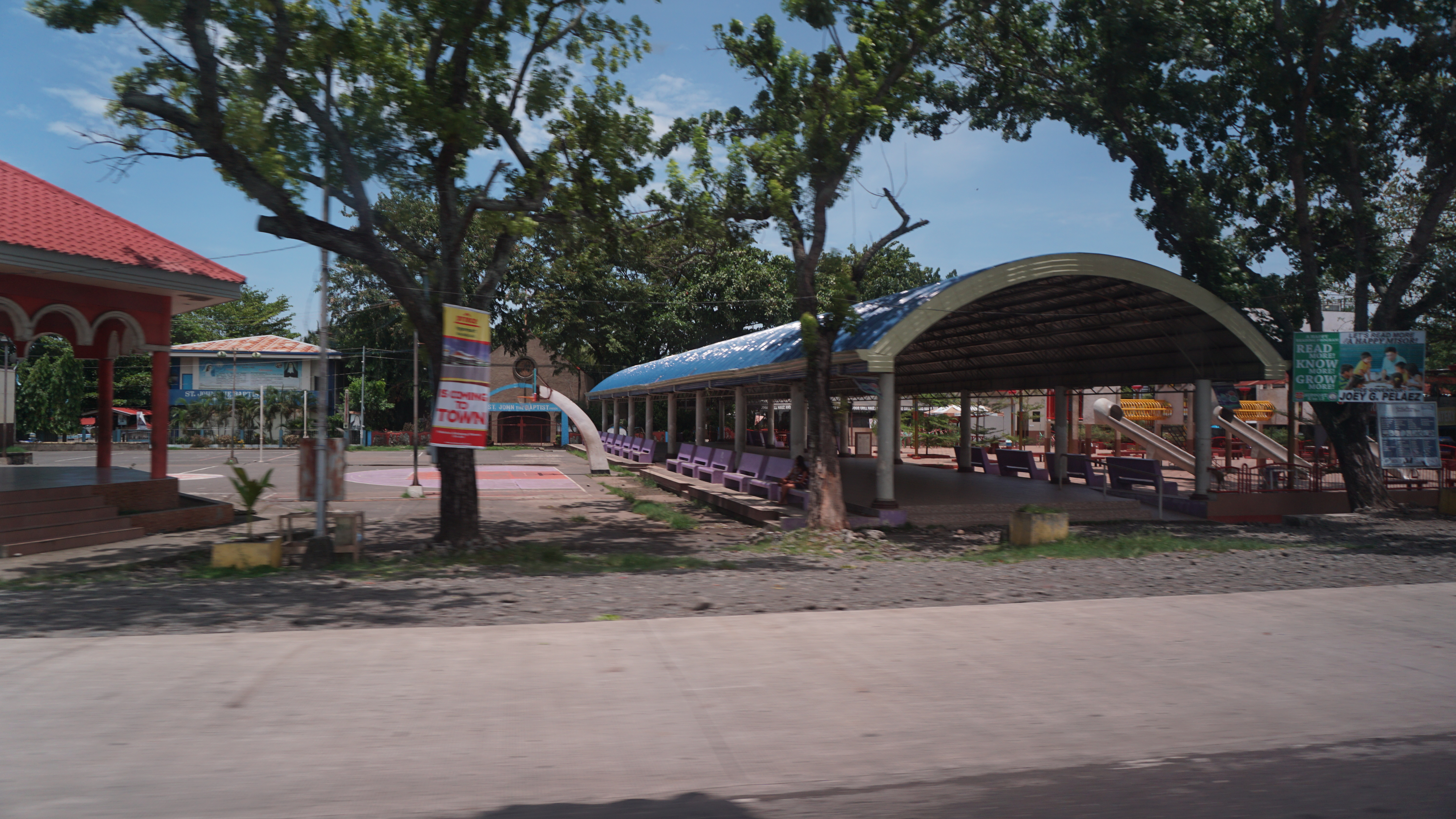
- Municipal Park

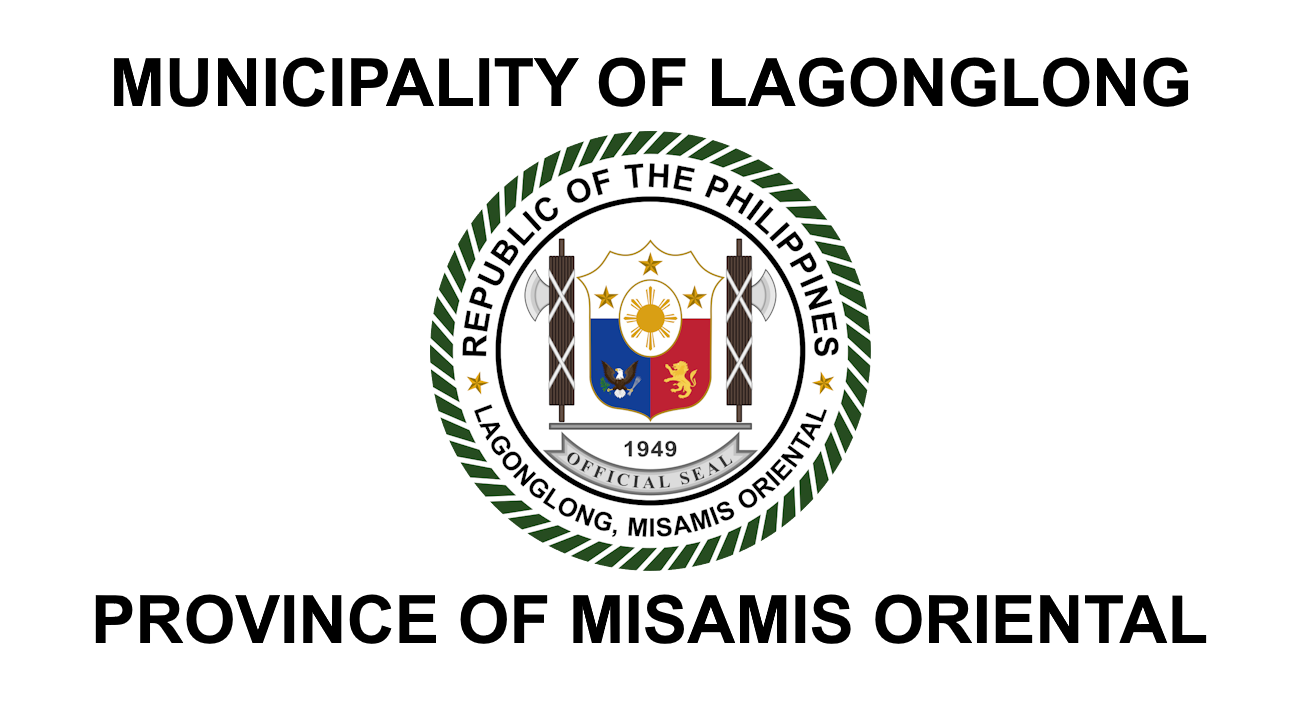
- Flag Seal

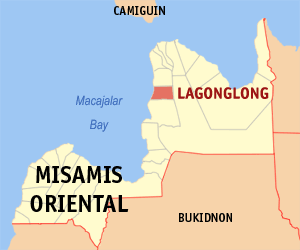
- Map of Misamis Oriental with Lagonglong highlighted
- Interactive map of Lagonglong
- Location within the Philippines
- Coordinates: 8°48′N 124°47′E
- Country: Philippines
- Region: Northern Mindanao
- Province: Misamis Oriental
- District: 1st district
- Founded: 1949
- Barangays: 10 (see Barangays)

Government
  - Type: Sangguniang Bayan
  - Mayor: Franz Angelo A. Capistrano
  - Vice Mayor: Marita D. Ramonal
  - Representative: Karen Lagbas
  - Municipal Council: Members: Benjamin G. Capistrano; Sammy T. Velarde; Renie U. Llausas; Kaiser P. Acao; Charlemagne C. Marban III; Teresa A. Delima; Teodulo B. Sabucdalao; Aldrich C. Yugom
  - Electorate: 19,028 voters (2025)

Area
  - Total: 83.78 km^{2} (32.35 sq mi)
- Elevation: 128 m (420 ft)
- Highest elevation: 808 m (2,651 ft)
- Lowest elevation: −1 m (−3.3 ft)

Population (2024 census)
  - Total: 25,072
  - Density: 299.3/km^{2} (775.1/sq mi)
  - Households: 5,491

Economy
  - Income class: 4th municipal income class
  - Poverty incidence: 27.61% (2023)
  - Revenue: ₱ 139.4 million (2024)
  - Assets: ₱ 444.9 million (2024)
  - Expenditure: ₱ 122.7 million (2024)
  - Liabilities: ₱ 148.8 million (2024)

Service provider
  - Electricity: Misamis Oriental 2 Rural Electric Cooperative (MORESCO 2)
- Time zone: UTC+8 (PST)
- ZIP code: 9006
- PSGC: 1004313000
- IDD : area code: +63 (0)88
- Native languages: Cebuano; Binukid; Subanon; Tagalog

Lagonglong, officially the Municipality of Lagonglong (Cebuano: Lungsod sa Lagonglong; Tagalog: Bayan ng Lagonglong), is a municipality in the province of Misamis Oriental, Philippines. According to the 2024 census, it has a population of 25,072 people.

== Geography ==
=== Barangays ===
Lagonglong is politically subdivided into 10 barangays. Each barangay consists of puroks while some have sitios.

- Banglay
- Dampil
- Gaston
- Kabulawan
- Kauswagan
- Lumbo
- Manaol
- Poblacion
- Tabok
- Umagos

=== Climate ===
Climate data for Lagonglong, Misamis Oriental
Month	Jan	Feb	Mar	Apr	May	Jun	Jul	Aug	Sep	Oct	Nov	Dec	Year
Mean daily maximum °C (°F)	28 (82)	28 (82)	29 (84)	30 (86)	30 (86)	30 (86)	30 (86)	30 (86)	30 (86)	29 (84)	29 (84)	28 (82)	29 (85)
Mean daily minimum °C (°F)	23 (73)	23 (73)	23 (73)	23 (73)	25 (77)	25 (77)	25 (77)	25 (77)	25 (77)	25 (77)	24 (75)	24 (75)	24 (75)
Average precipitation mm (inches)	327 (12.9)	254 (10.0)	185 (7.3)	128 (5.0)	215 (8.5)	273 (10.7)	248 (9.8)	243 (9.6)	214 (8.4)	246 (9.7)	271 (10.7)	271 (10.7)	2,875 (113.3)
Average rainy days	24.3	21.1	22.5	20.6	28.3	28.8	29.4	29.0	28.0	28.3	26.0	24.2	310.5
Source: Meteoblue

== Demographics ==
Population census of Lagonglong

Year	Pop.	±% p.a.
1903	1,758	—
1960	6,899	+2.43%
1970	9,332	+3.06%
1975	11,395	+4.09%
1980	13,576	+3.56%
1990	12,705	−0.66%
1995	15,258	+3.49%

Year	Pop.	±% p.a.
2000	16,882	+2.19%
2007	18,372	+1.17%
2010	19,303	+1.82%
2015	21,659	+2.22%
2020	24,190	+2.35%
2024	25,072	+0.86%

Source: Philippine Statistics Authority

In the 2024 census, the population of Lagonglong was 25,072 people, with a density of 300 inhabitants per square kilometre or 780 inhabitants per square mile.

== Economy ==
Poverty incidence of Lagonglong (%)

Source: Philippine Statistics Authority
