= Sugbongcogon =

Municipality in Misamis Oriental, Philippines

Municipality of Sugbongcogon
- Municipality
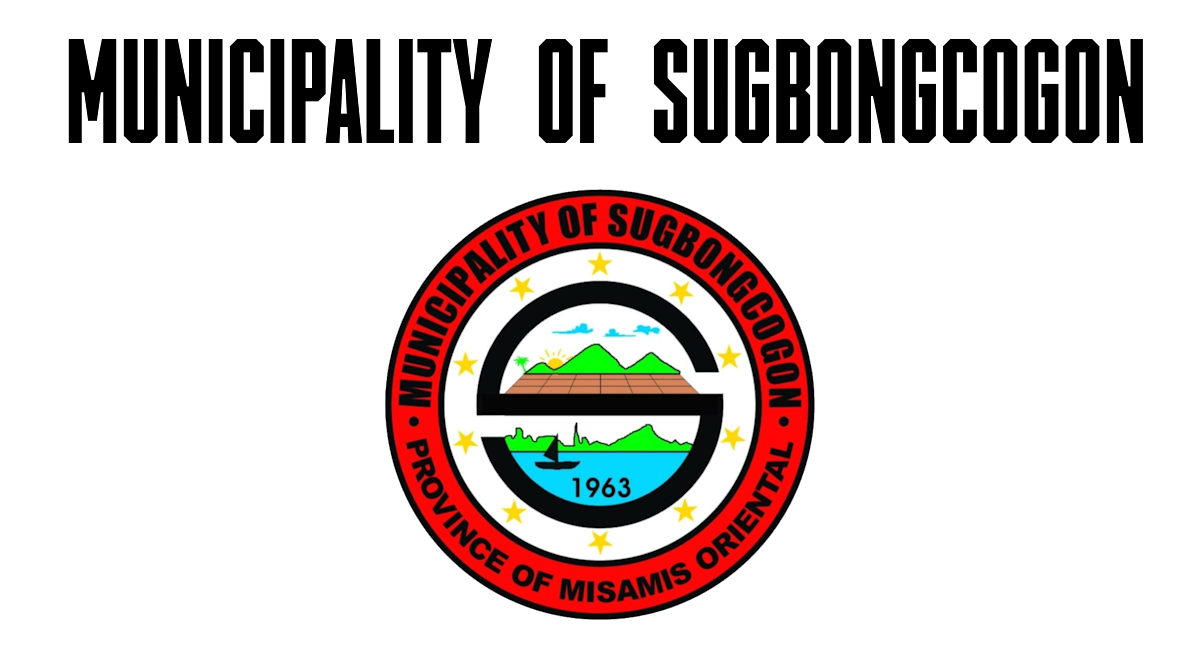
- Flag
- Nicknames: Cleanest and Greenest Municipality of Misamis Oriental, Summer Capital of the Province of Misamis Oriental
- Anthem: Sugbongcogon Kong Mahal
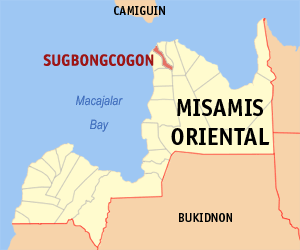
- Map of Misamis Oriental with Sugbongcogon highlighted
- Interactive map of Municipality of Sugbongcogon
- Location within the Philippines
- Coordinates: 8°57′N 124°47′E
- Country: Philippines
- Region: Northern Mindanao
- Province: Misamis Oriental
- District: 1st district
- Founded: June 22, 1963
- Mandate: Republic Act No. 3633
- Barangays: 10 (see Barangays)

Government
  - Type: Sangguniang Bayan
  - Mayor: Mildred L. Mondigo
  - Vice Mayor: Ivan Chester E. Lagbas
  - Representative: Christian S. Unabia
  - Municipal Council: Members: Ricky B. Aragua, Jr.; Madonna L. Nercuit; Edison S. Aragua; Michelle N. Anayron; Wilfredo S. Abcede; Benedict J. Lagbas, Jr.; Maria Sherry S. Cometa; Andrew Wilson J. Cabana
  - Electorate: 9,758 voters (2025)

Area
  - Total: 26.50 km^{2} (10.23 sq mi)
- Elevation: 108 m (354 ft)
- Highest elevation: 604 m (1,982 ft)
- Lowest elevation: 0 m (0 ft)

Population (2024 census)
  - Total: 11,156
  - Density: 421.0/km^{2} (1,090/sq mi)
  - Households: 2,221

Economy
  - Income class: 5th municipal income class
  - Poverty incidence: 35.37% (2023)
  - Revenue: ₱ 93.81 million (2024)
  - Assets: ₱ 357.3 million (2024)
  - Expenditure: ₱ 89.4 million (2024)
  - Liabilities: ₱ 110.3 million (2024)

Service provider
  - Electricity: Misamis Oriental 2 Rural Electric Cooperative (MORESCO 2)
- Time zone: UTC+8 (PST)
- ZIP code: 9009
- PSGC: 1004323000
- IDD : area code: +63 (0)88
- Native languages: Cebuano; Binukid; Subanon; Tagalog
- Website: www.sugbongcogonmisor.gov.ph

Sugbongcogon, officially the Municipality of Sugbongcogon (Cebuano: Lungsod sa Sugbongcogon; Tagalog: Bayan ng Sugbongcogon), is a municipality in the province of Misamis Oriental, Philippines. According to the 2024 census, it has a population of 11,156 people. Sugbongcogon became a separate municipality on June 22, 1963.

== Geography ==
=== Barangays ===
Sugbongcogon is politically subdivided into 10 barangays. Each barangay consists of puroks while some have sitios.

- Alicomohan
- Ampianga
- Kaulayanan
- Kidampas
- Kiraging
- Mangga
- Mimbuahan
- Poblacion
- Santa Cruz
- Silad

=== Climate ===
Climate data for Sugbongcogon, Misamis Oriental
Month	Jan	Feb	Mar	Apr	May	Jun	Jul	Aug	Sep	Oct	Nov	Dec	Year
Mean daily maximum °C (°F)	27 (81)	27 (81)	28 (82)	29 (84)	29 (84)	29 (84)	29 (84)	29 (84)	29 (84)	29 (84)	28 (82)	27 (81)	28 (83)
Mean daily minimum °C (°F)	23 (73)	22 (72)	22 (72)	23 (73)	24 (75)	24 (75)	24 (75)	24 (75)	24 (75)	24 (75)	24 (75)	23 (73)	23 (74)
Average precipitation mm (inches)	327 (12.9)	254 (10.0)	185 (7.3)	128 (5.0)	215 (8.5)	273 (10.7)	248 (9.8)	243 (9.6)	214 (8.4)	246 (9.7)	271 (10.7)	271 (10.7)	2,875 (113.3)
Average rainy days	24.3	21.1	22.5	20.6	28.3	28.8	29.4	29.0	28.0	28.3	26.0	24.2	310.5
Source: Meteoblue

== Demographics ==
Population census of Sugbongcogon

Year	Pop.	±% p.a.
1970	5,276	—
1975	6,021	+2.68%
1980	6,243	+0.73%
1990	6,175	−0.11%
1995	6,957	+2.26%
2000	7,362	+1.22%

Year	Pop.	±% p.a.
2007	8,164	+1.44%
2010	8,745	+2.53%
2015	9,226	+1.02%
2020	9,764	+1.20%
2024	11,156	+3.25%

Source: Philippine Statistics Authority

In the 2024 census, the population of Sugbongcogon was 11,156 people, with a density of 420 inhabitants per square kilometre or 1,100 inhabitants per square mile.

== Economy ==
Poverty incidence of Sugbongcogon (%)

Source: Philippine Statistics Authority
