= Salay =

Municipality in Misamis Oriental, Philippines

- Municipality
- Municipality of Salay
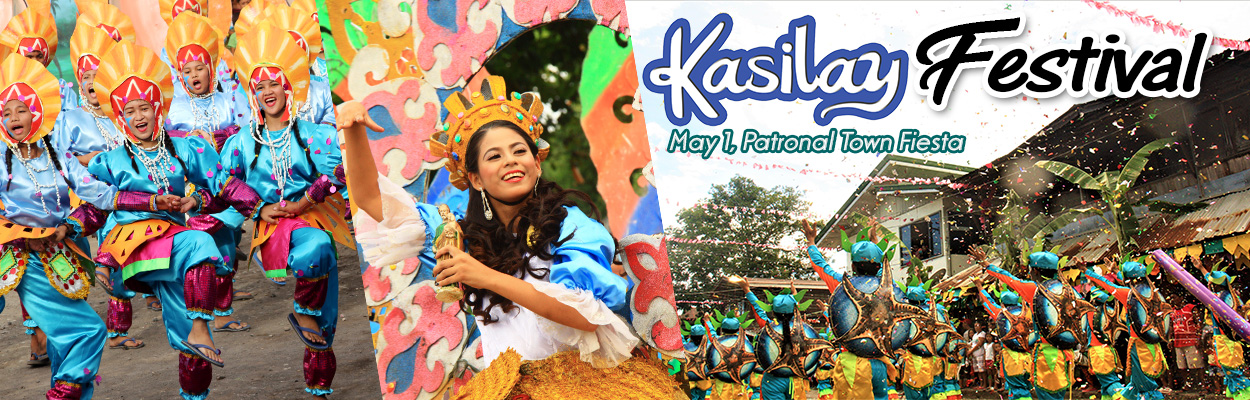
- Kasilay Festival celebrated every 1 May in Salay, Misamis Oriental

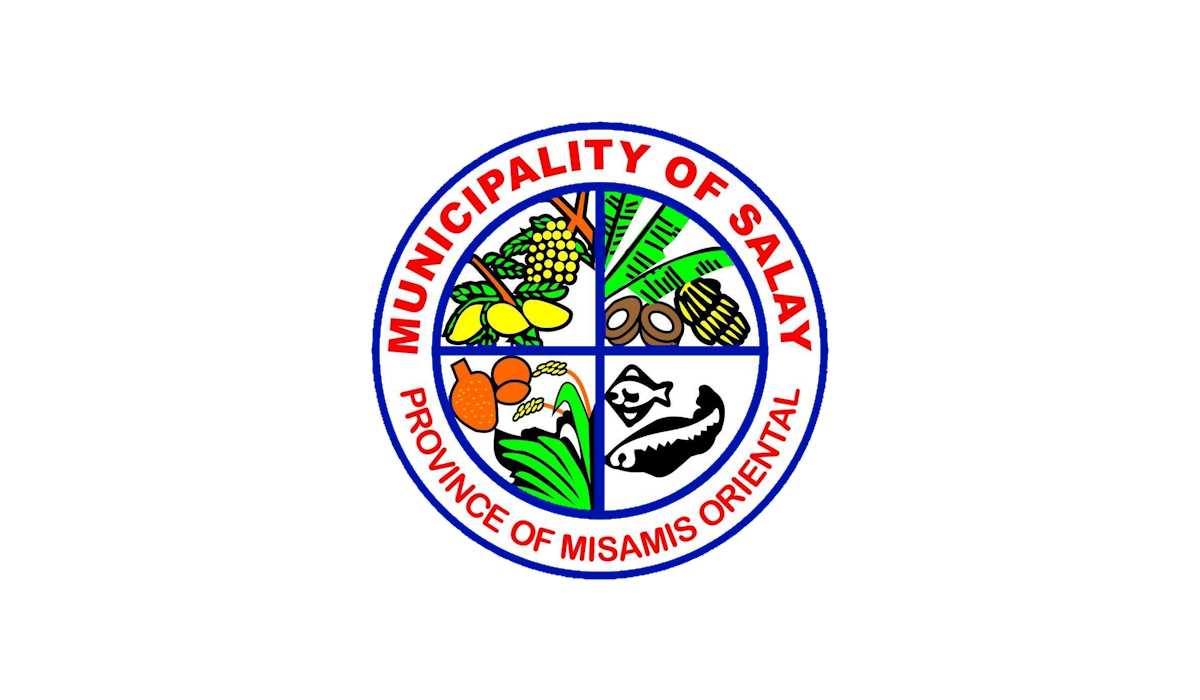
- Flag

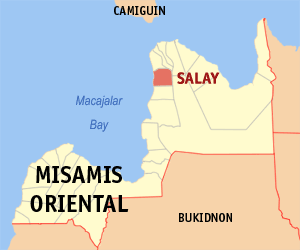
- Map of Misamis Oriental with Salay highlighted
- Interactive map of Salay
- Location within the Philippines
- Coordinates: 8°52′N 124°48′E
- Country: Philippines
- Region: Northern Mindanao
- Province: Misamis Oriental
- District: 1st district
- Founded: January 1, 1920
- Mandate: Executive Order No. 94, s. 1919
- Barangays: 18 (see Barangays)

Government
  - Type: Sangguniang Bayan
  - Mayor: Angelo G. Capistrano Jr.
  - Vice Mayor: Rey Amelito K. Tan
  - Representative: Christian S. Unabia
  - Municipal Council: Members: Roy M. Rostata; Dianne Jane L. Galamiton; Glenn D. Zambrano Sr.; Imelda C. Deang; Lorimer U. Mangay; Ronald S. Cervantes; Canesio G. Tagarda; Jacqueline C. Abejuela
  - Electorate: 22,374 voters (2025)

Area
  - Total: 92.79 km^{2} (35.83 sq mi)
- Elevation: 148 m (486 ft)
- Highest elevation: 785 m (2,575 ft)
- Lowest elevation: 0 m (0 ft)

Population (2024 census)
  - Total: 31,128
  - Density: 335.5/km^{2} (868.9/sq mi)
  - Households: 7,103

Economy
  - Income class: 2nd municipal income class
  - Poverty incidence: 26.45% (2023)
  - Revenue: ₱ 221.1 million (2024)
  - Assets: ₱ 720 million (2024)
  - Expenditure: ₱ 205.1 million (2024)
  - Liabilities: ₱ 260.7 million (2024)

Service provider
  - Electricity: Misamis Oriental 2 Rural Electric Cooperative (MORESCO 2)
- Time zone: UTC+8 (PST)
- ZIP code: 9007
- PSGC: 1004322000
- IDD : area code: +63 (0)88
- Native languages: Cebuano; Binukid; Subanon; Tagalog
- Website: www.salaymisor.gov.ph

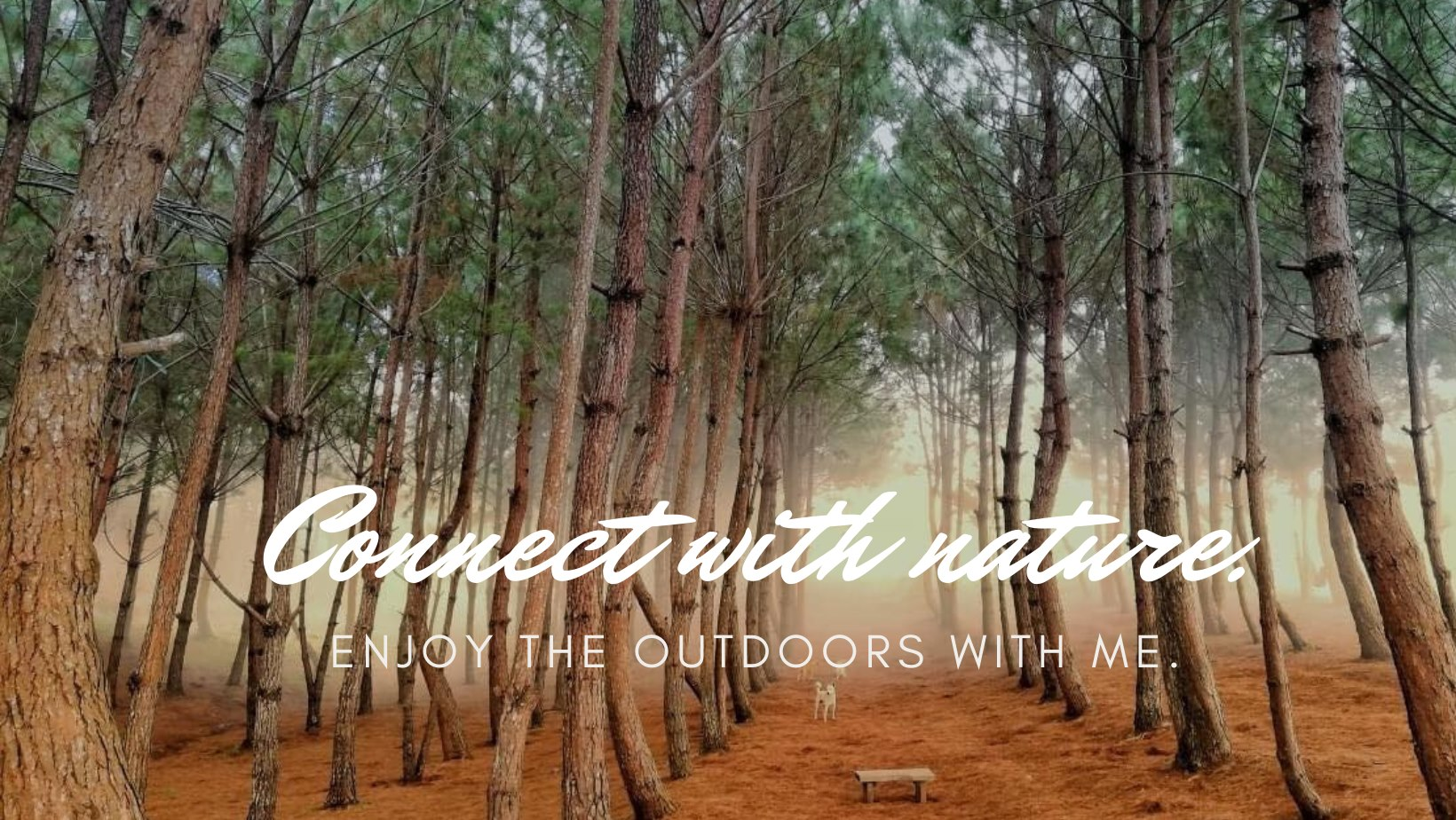
Matampa Pines Park or known as the "Little Baguio" is a famous tourist spot in Salay, Misamis Oriental

Salay, officially the Municipality of Salay (Cebuano: Lungsod sa Salay; Tagalog: Bayan ng Salay), is a municipality in the province of Misamis Oriental, Philippines. According to the 2024 census, it has a population of 31,128 people. The town is known for its handmade paper and papercrafts, similar to washi, but made with indigenous fibers.

Poblacion is the center of Salay and had been governed by the Capistrano politicians until the 2007 elections. Lanzones is one of the major source of income among Salayanos aside from commerce at Poblacion and fishing to other people. May 1 is the official feast day of Salay although March feast is also celebrated and is the original.

Salay Central School provides primary education to the graders in this town while the nearby Salay National High School provides the secondary education, the latter has been nationally recognized for quality education among public schools.

== Geography ==
=== Barangays ===
Salay is politically subdivided into 18 barangays. Each barangay consists of puroks while some have sitios.

- Alipuaton
- Ampenican
- Bunal
- Casulog
- Dinagsaan
- Guinalaban
- Ili-ilihon
- Inobulan
- Looc
- Matampa
- Membuli
- Poblacion
- Salagsag
- Salay River I
- Salay River II
- Saray
- Tinagaan
- Yungod

=== Climate ===
Climate data for Salay, Misamis Oriental
Month	Jan	Feb	Mar	Apr	May	Jun	Jul	Aug	Sep	Oct	Nov	Dec	Year
Mean daily maximum °C (°F)	28 (82)	28 (82)	29 (84)	30 (86)	30 (86)	30 (86)	30 (86)	30 (86)	30 (86)	29 (84)	29 (84)	28 (82)	29 (85)
Mean daily minimum °C (°F)	23 (73)	23 (73)	23 (73)	23 (73)	25 (77)	25 (77)	25 (77)	25 (77)	25 (77)	25 (77)	24 (75)	24 (75)	24 (75)
Average precipitation mm (inches)	327 (12.9)	254 (10.0)	185 (7.3)	128 (5.0)	215 (8.5)	273 (10.7)	248 (9.8)	243 (9.6)	214 (8.4)	246 (9.7)	271 (10.7)	271 (10.7)	2,875 (113.3)
Average rainy days	24.3	21.1	22.5	20.6	28.3	28.8	29.4	29.0	28.0	28.31	26.0	24.2	310.51
Source: Meteoblue

== Demographics ==
Population census of Salay

Year	Pop.	±% p.a.
1903	3,411	—
1939	10,777	+3.25%
1948	13,194	+2.27%
1960	15,769	+1.50%
1970	13,386	−1.62%
1975	15,751	+3.32%
1980	17,945	+2.64%
1990	18,101	+0.09%

Year	Pop.	±% p.a.
1995	18,923	+0.84%
2000	19,664	+0.83%
2007	22,577	+1.92%
2010	27,591	+7.57%
2015	28,705	+0.76%
2020	29,998	+0.93%
2024	31,128	+0.89%

Source: Philippine Statistics Authority

In the 2024 census, the population of Salay was 31,128 people, with a density of 340 inhabitants per square kilometre or 880 inhabitants per square mile.

== Economy ==
Poverty incidence of Salay

Source: Philippine Statistics Authority

== Transportation ==
On February 16, 2022, the new Salay Terminal II was officially opened when it fully operational. It caters buses to and from Butuan/Cagayan de Oro.
