= Kinoguitan =

Municipality in Misamis Oriental, Philippines

- Municipality
- Municipality of Kinoguitan
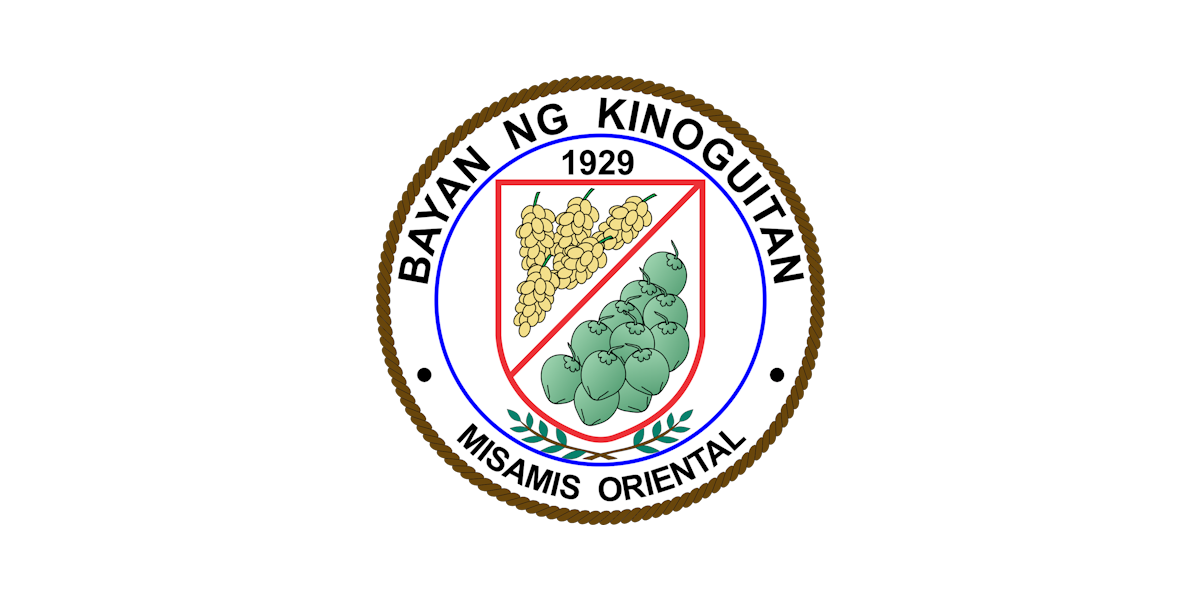
- Flag Seal

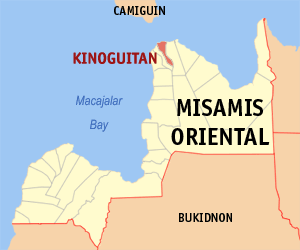
- Map of Misamis Oriental with Kinoguitan highlighted
- Interactive map of Kinoguitan
- Location within the Philippines
- Coordinates: 8°59′08″N 124°47′37″E
- Country: Philippines
- Region: Northern Mindanao
- Province: Misamis Oriental
- District: 1st district
- Founded: June 22, 1929 (Executive Order No. 178, s. 1929)
- Barangays: 15 (see Barangays)

Government
  - Type: Sangguniang Bayan
  - Mayor: Danilo A. Lagbas, Jr.
  - Vice Mayor: Tomas M. Zarate
  - Representative: Christian S. Unabia
  - Municipal Council: Members: Lilibeth M. Lagbas; Lorenzo Ramoso; Ernido Durano; Giovy Hisoler; Rodulfo Macabinlar; Hermes Avila; Jun Rey Pajaron; Eleno D. Zarate
  - Electorate: 12,537 voters (2025)

Area
  - Total: 42.56 km^{2} (16.43 sq mi)
- Elevation: 70 m (230 ft)
- Highest elevation: 454 m (1,490 ft)
- Lowest elevation: 0 m (0 ft)

Population (2024 census)
  - Total: 15,763
  - Density: 370.4/km^{2} (959.3/sq mi)
  - Households: 3,437

Economy
  - Income class: 4th municipal income class
  - Poverty incidence: 28.6% (2023)
  - Revenue: ₱ 98.6 million (2024)
  - Assets: ₱ 265.1 million (2024)
  - Expenditure: ₱ 112.8 million (2024)
  - Liabilities: ₱ 105.8 million (2024)

Service provider
  - Electricity: Misamis Oriental 2 Rural Electric Cooperative (MORESCO 2)
- Time zone: UTC+8 (PST)
- ZIP code: 9010
- PSGC: 1004312000
- IDD : area code: +63 (0)88
- Native languages: Cebuano; Binukid; Subanon; Tagalog
- Website: www.kinoguitanmisor.gov.ph

Kinoguitan, officially the Municipality of Kinoguitan (Cebuano: Lungsod sa Kinoguitan; Tagalog: Bayan ng Kinoguitan), is a municipality in the province of Misamis Oriental, Philippines. According to the 2024 census, it has a population of 15,763 people.

The town's name has been spelled as "Kinogitan" by the old folks, especially during the early 1950s.

== Geography ==
=== Barangays ===
Kinoguitan is politically subdivided into 15 barangays. Each barangay consists of puroks while some have sitios.

- Beray
- Bolisong
- Buko
- Kalitian
- Calubo
- Campo
- Esperanza
- Kagumahan
- Kitotok
- Panabol
- Poblacion
- Salicapawan
- Salubsob
- Suarez
- Sumalag

=== Climate ===
Climate data for Kinogitan, Misamis Oriental
Month	Jan	Feb	Mar	Apr	May	Jun	Jul	Aug	Sep	Oct	Nov	Dec	Year
Mean daily maximum °C (°F)	28 (82)	28 (82)	29 (84)	30 (86)	30 (86)	30 (86)	30 (86)	30 (86)	30 (86)	29 (84)	29 (84)	28 (82)	29 (85)
Mean daily minimum °C (°F)	23 (73)	23 (73)	23 (73)	23 (73)	25 (77)	25 (77)	25 (77)	25 (77)	25 (77)	25 (77)	24 (75)	24 (75)	24 (75)
Average precipitation mm (inches)	327 (12.9)	254 (10.0)	185 (7.3)	128 (5.0)	215 (8.5)	273 (10.7)	248 (9.8)	243 (9.6)	214 (8.4)	246 (9.7)	271 (10.7)	271 (10.7)	2,875 (113.3)
Average rainy days	24.3	21.1	22.5	20.6	28.3	28.8	29.4	29.0	28.0	28.3	26.0	24.2	310.5
Source: Meteoblue

== Demographics ==
Population census of Kinoguitan

Year	Pop.	±% p.a.
1939	8,907	—
1948	15,670	+6.48%
1960	13,584	−1.18%
1970	6,473	−7.14%
1975	6,724	+0.77%
1980	7,203	+1.39%
1990	8,795	+2.02%

Year	Pop.	±% p.a.
1995	10,406	+3.20%
2000	10,519	+0.23%
2007	11,915	+1.73%
2010	12,761	+2.53%
2015	14,391	+2.32%
2020	14,091	−0.44%
2024	15,763	+2.73%

Source: Philippine Statistics Authority

In the 2024 census, the population of Kinoguitan was 15,763 people, with a density of 370 inhabitants per square kilometre or 960 inhabitants per square mile.

== Economy ==
Poverty incidence of Kinoguitan (%)

Source: Philippine Statistics Authority
