= Karen Lagbas =

Filipino politician

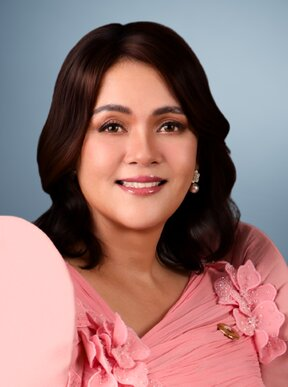
- Official portrait, 2025

Member of the House of Representatives of the Philippines from Misamis Oriental's 1st District
- Incumbent
- Assumed office June 30, 2025
- Preceded by: Christian Unabia

Personal details
- Born: Jennifer Artadi Lagbas; February 26, 1976 (age 50)
- Party: NUP (2021–present)
- Other political affiliations: Liberal (2009–2010)
- Parent: Danilo Lagbas (father)

Jennifer "Karen" Artadi Lagbas (born February 26, 1976) is a Filipino lawyer and politician who is a member of the House of Representatives. She has represented Misamis Oriental's 1st congressional district since the 2025 elections. She is an attorney.

== See also ==
- List of female members of the House of Representatives of the Philippines
