= Talisayan =

Municipality in Misamis Oriental, Philippines

- Municipality
- Municipality of Talisayan
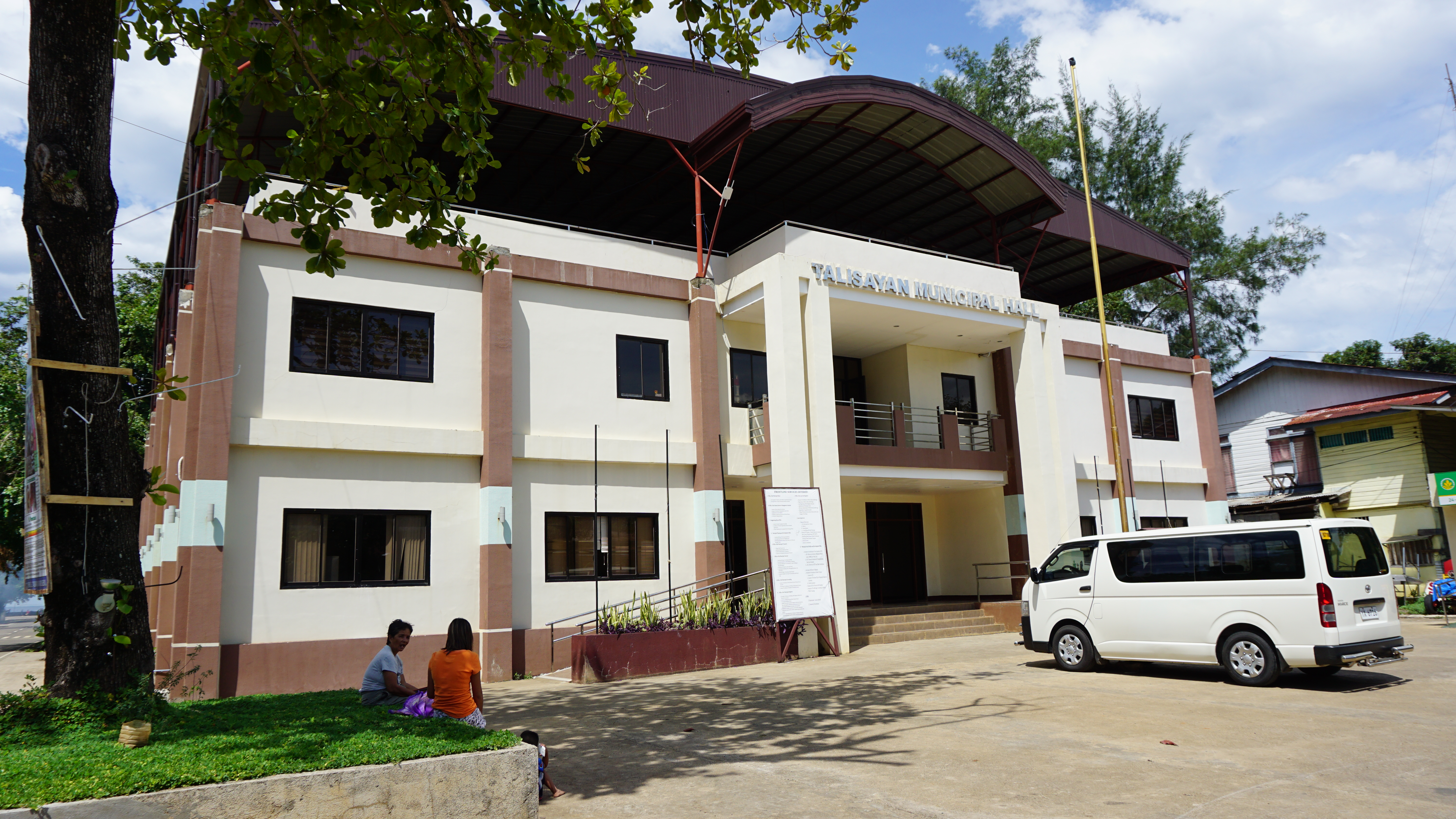
- The Municipal Hall

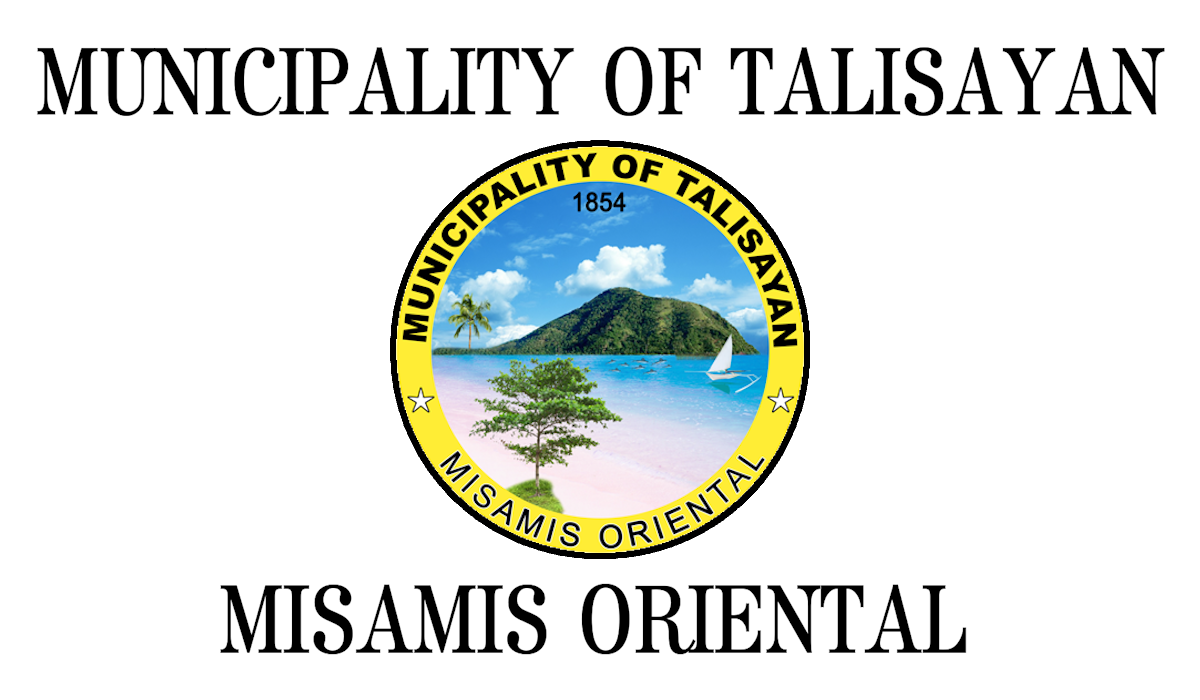
- Flag

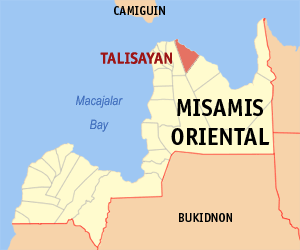
- Map of Misamis Oriental with Talisayan highlighted
- Interactive map of Talisayan
- Location within the Philippines
- Coordinates: 8°59′30″N 124°53′00″E
- Country: Philippines
- Region: Northern Mindanao
- Province: Misamis Oriental
- District: 1st district
- Founded: 1864
- Barangays: 18 (see Barangays)

Government
  - Type: Sangguniang Bayan
  - Mayor: Ciriaco A. Talines
  - Vice Mayor: Jimmy P. Taray
  - Representative: Jennifer "Karen" Artadi Lagbas
  - Municipal Council: Members: Niel Asupan; Henry G. Macalib-og; Raffy R. Mendoza; Don Luis Sumanpan; Joveline B. Asuncion; Andres H. Llagas; Josefina T. Omondang; Ric B. Llemit
  - Electorate: 20,398 voters (2025)

Area
  - Total: 140.33 km^{2} (54.18 sq mi)
- Elevation: 109 m (358 ft)
- Highest elevation: 522 m (1,713 ft)
- Lowest elevation: 0 m (0 ft)

Population (2024 census)
  - Total: 26,801
  - Density: 190.99/km^{2} (494.65/sq mi)
  - Households: 5,974

Economy
  - Income class: 3rd municipal income class
  - Poverty incidence: 28.52% (2023)
  - Revenue: ₱ 15.32 million (2024)
  - Assets: ₱ 241 million (2024)
  - Expenditure: ₱ 135.3 million (2024)
  - Liabilities: ₱ 63.62 million (2024)

Service provider
  - Electricity: Misamis Oriental 2 Rural Electric Cooperative (MORESCO 2)
- Time zone: UTC+8 (PST)
- ZIP code: 9012
- PSGC: 1004325000
- IDD : area code: +63 (0)88
- Native languages: Cebuano; Binukid; Subanon; Tagalog
- Website: www.talisayanmisor.gov.ph

Talisayan, officially the Municipality of Talisayan (Cebuano: Lungsod sa Talisayan; Tagalog: Bayan ng Talisayan), is a municipality in the province of Misamis Oriental, Philippines. According to the 2024 census, it has a population of 26,801 people.

== History ==
At the time of the American occupation, Talisayan gained its territory for a while with the passage of Act No. 951 when the municipality of Gingoog became part of it, but was separated and reorganized by Act No. 1618 of 1907.

== Geography ==
=== Barangays ===
Talisayan is politically subdivided into 18 barangays. Each barangay consists of puroks while some have sitios.

- Bugdang
- Calamcam
- Casibole
- Macopa
- Magkarila
- Mahayag
- Mandahilag
- Mintabon
- Pangpangon
- Poblacion
- Pook
- Punta Santiago
- Puting Balas
- San Jose
- Santa Ines
- Sibantang
- Sindangan
- Tagbocboc

=== Climate ===
Climate data for Talisayan, Misamis Oriental
Month	Jan	Feb	Mar	Apr	May	Jun	Jul	Aug	Sep	Oct	Nov	Dec	Year
Mean daily maximum °C (°F)	28 (82)	28 (82)	29 (84)	30 (86)	30 (86)	30 (86)	30 (86)	30 (86)	30 (86)	29 (84)	29 (84)	28 (82)	29 (85)
Mean daily minimum °C (°F)	23 (73)	23 (73)	23 (73)	23 (73)	25 (77)	25 (77)	25 (77)	25 (77)	25 (77)	25 (77)	24 (75)	24 (75)	24 (75)
Average precipitation mm (inches)	327 (12.9)	254 (10.0)	185 (7.3)	128 (5.0)	215 (8.5)	273 (10.7)	248 (9.8)	243 (9.6)	214 (8.4)	246 (9.7)	271 (10.7)	271 (10.7)	2,875 (113.3)
Average rainy days	24.3	21.1	22.5	20.6	28.3	28.8	29.4	29.0	28.0	28.3	26.0	24.2	310.5
Source: Meteoblue

== Demographics ==
Population census of Talisayan

Year	Pop.	±% p.a.
1903	7,571	—
1918	13,126	+3.74%
1939	17,476	+1.37%
1948	22,215	+2.70%
1960	13,818	−3.88%
1970	14,988	+0.82%
1975	15,016	+0.04%
1980	15,667	+0.85%

Year	Pop.	±% p.a.
1990	17,015	+0.83%
1995	19,742	+2.82%
2000	19,959	+0.23%
2007	20,842	+0.60%
2010	23,289	+4.12%
2015	24,505	+0.97%
2020	25,761	+1.06%
2024	26,801	+0.95%

Source: Philippine Statistics Authority

In the 2024 census, the population of Talisayan was 26,801 people, with a density of 190 inhabitants per square kilometre or 490 inhabitants per square mile.

== Economy ==
Poverty incidence of Talisayan (%)

Source: Philippine Statistics Authority
