= Misamis Oriental =

Province in Northern Mindanao, Philippines

- Province
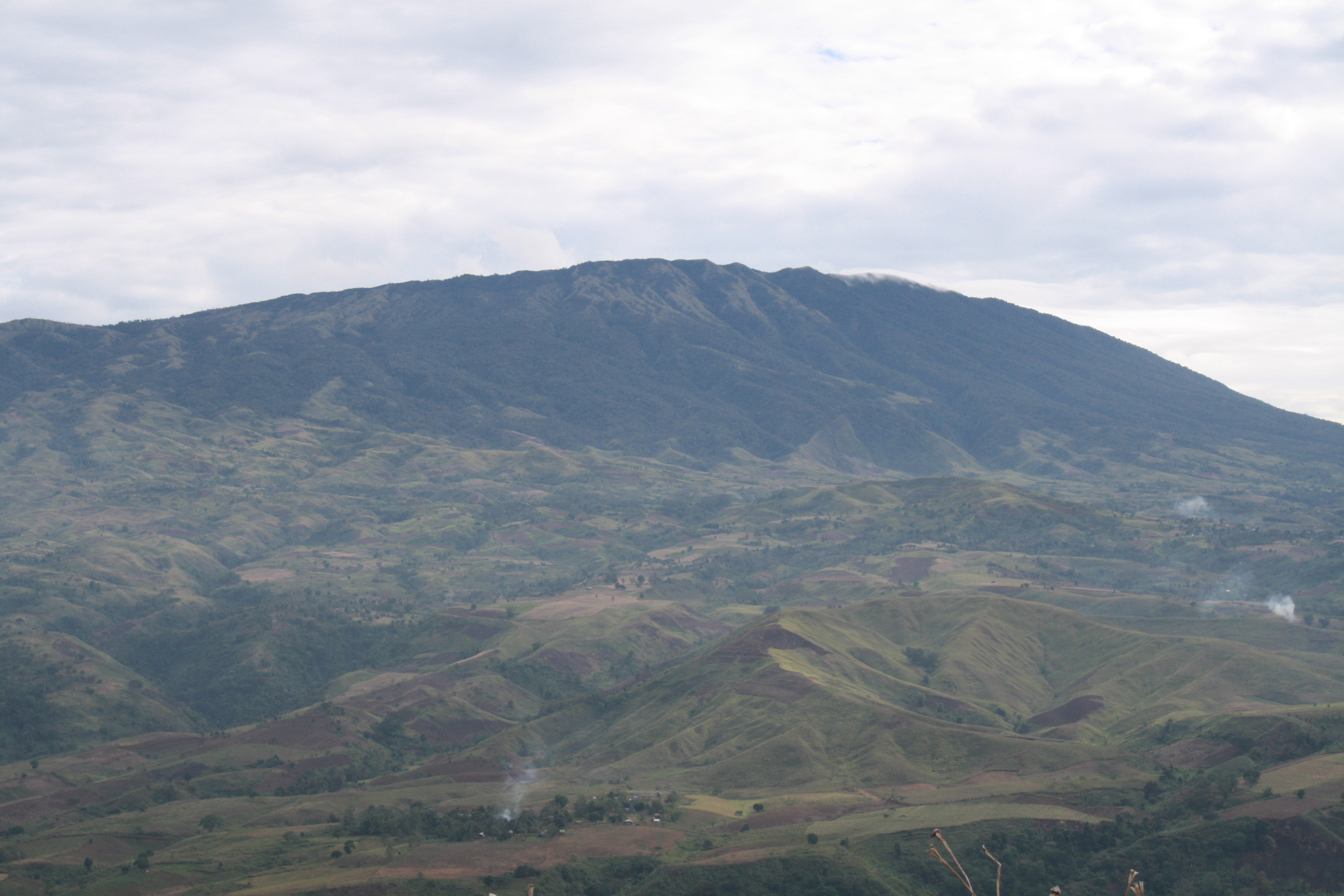
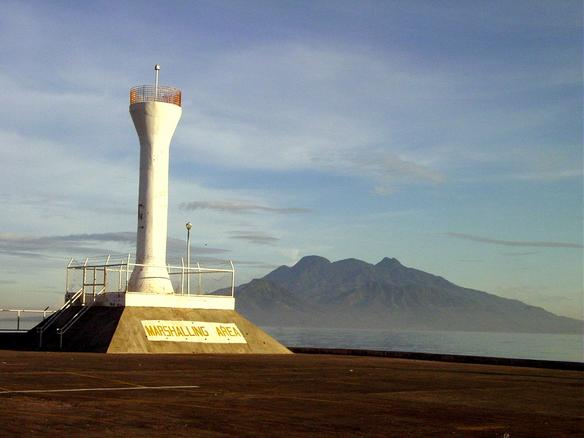
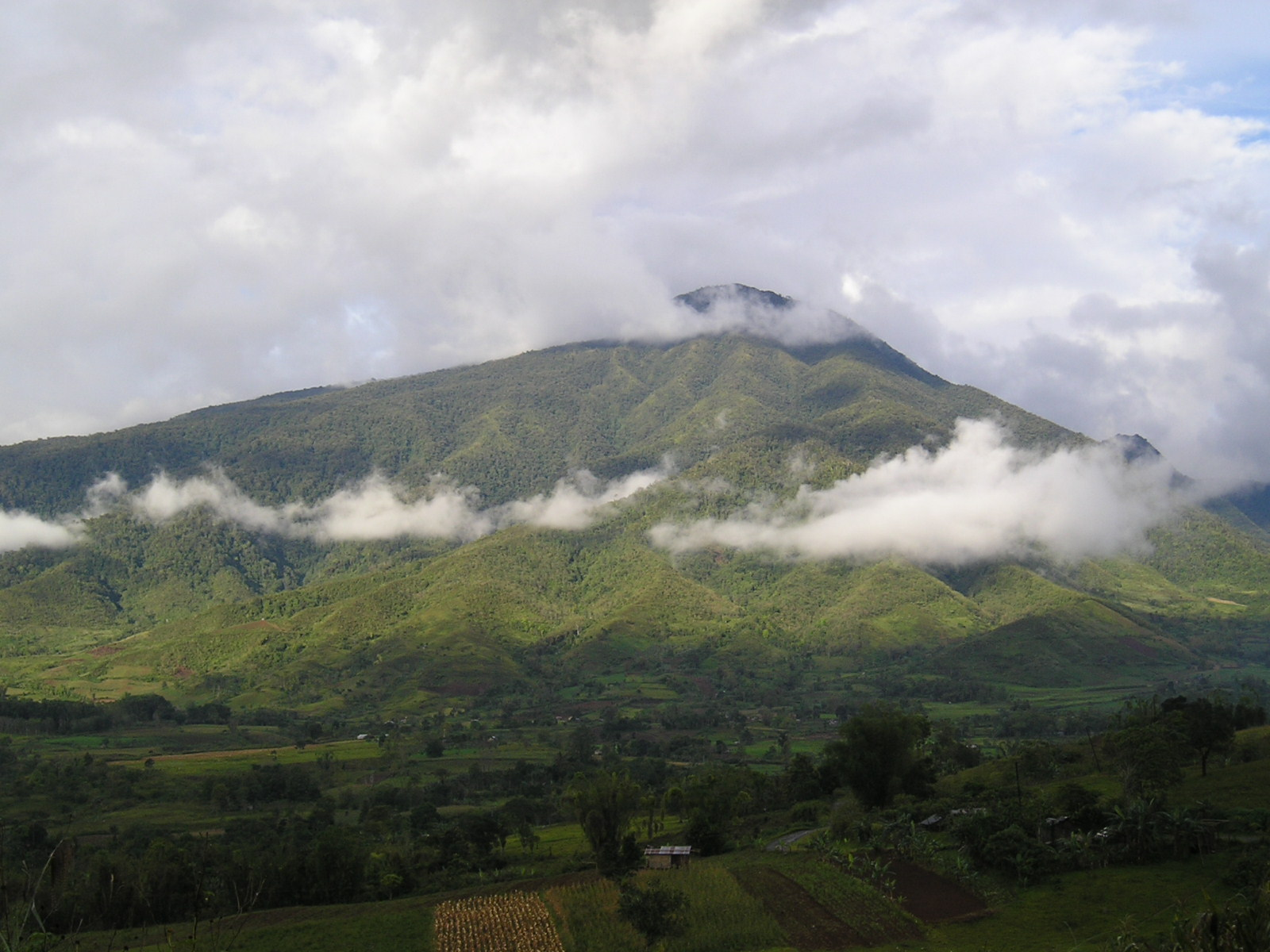
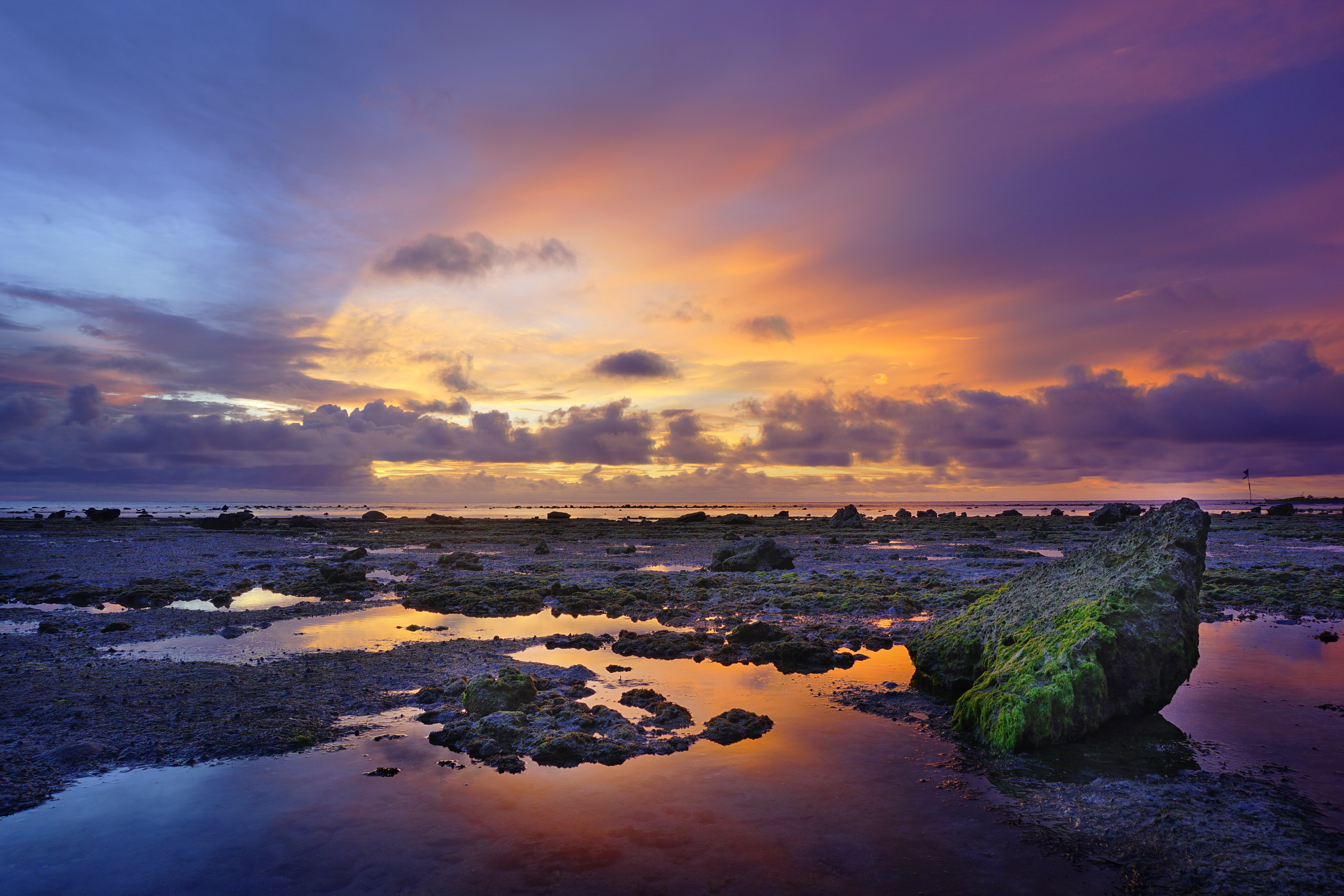
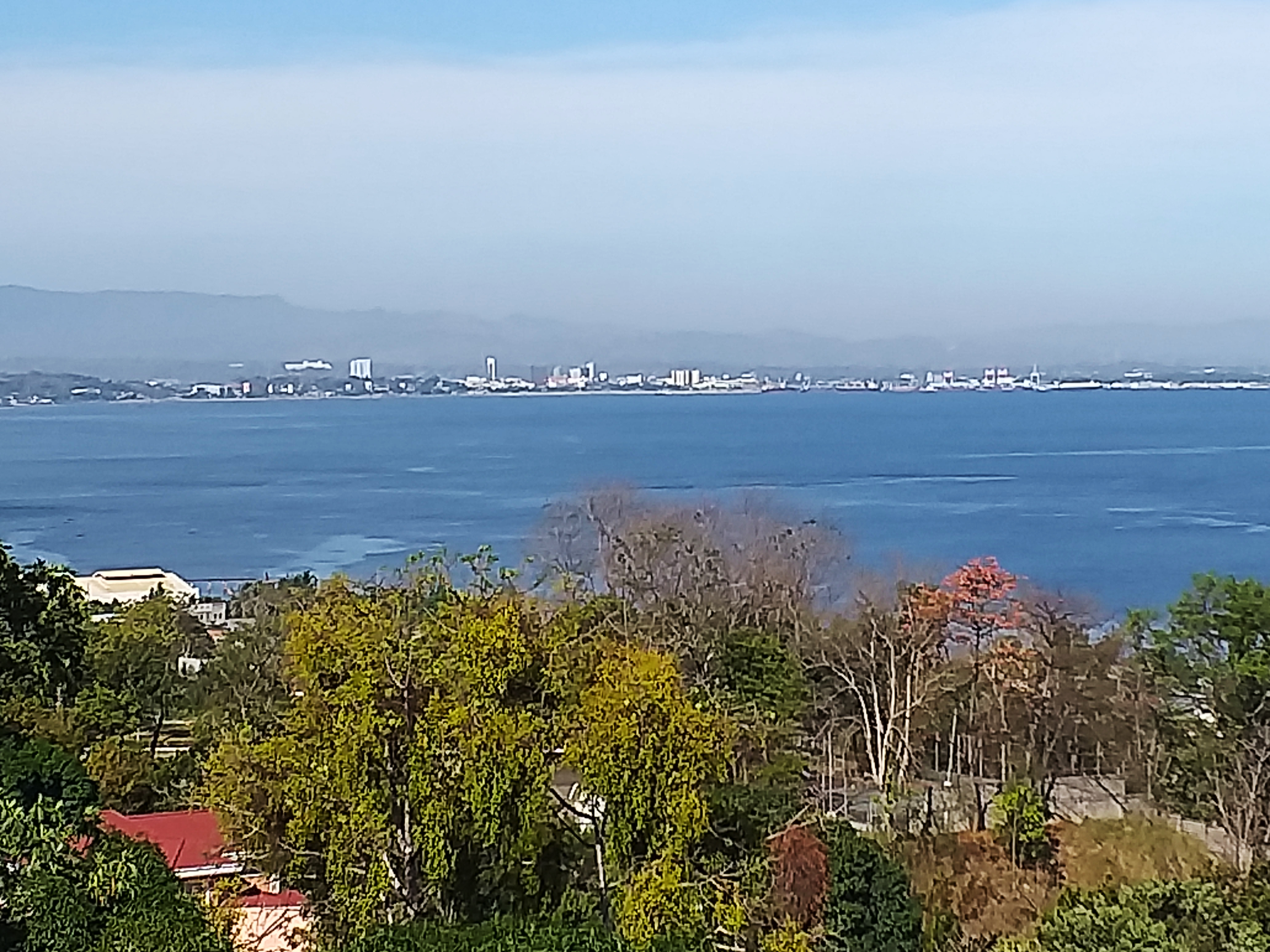
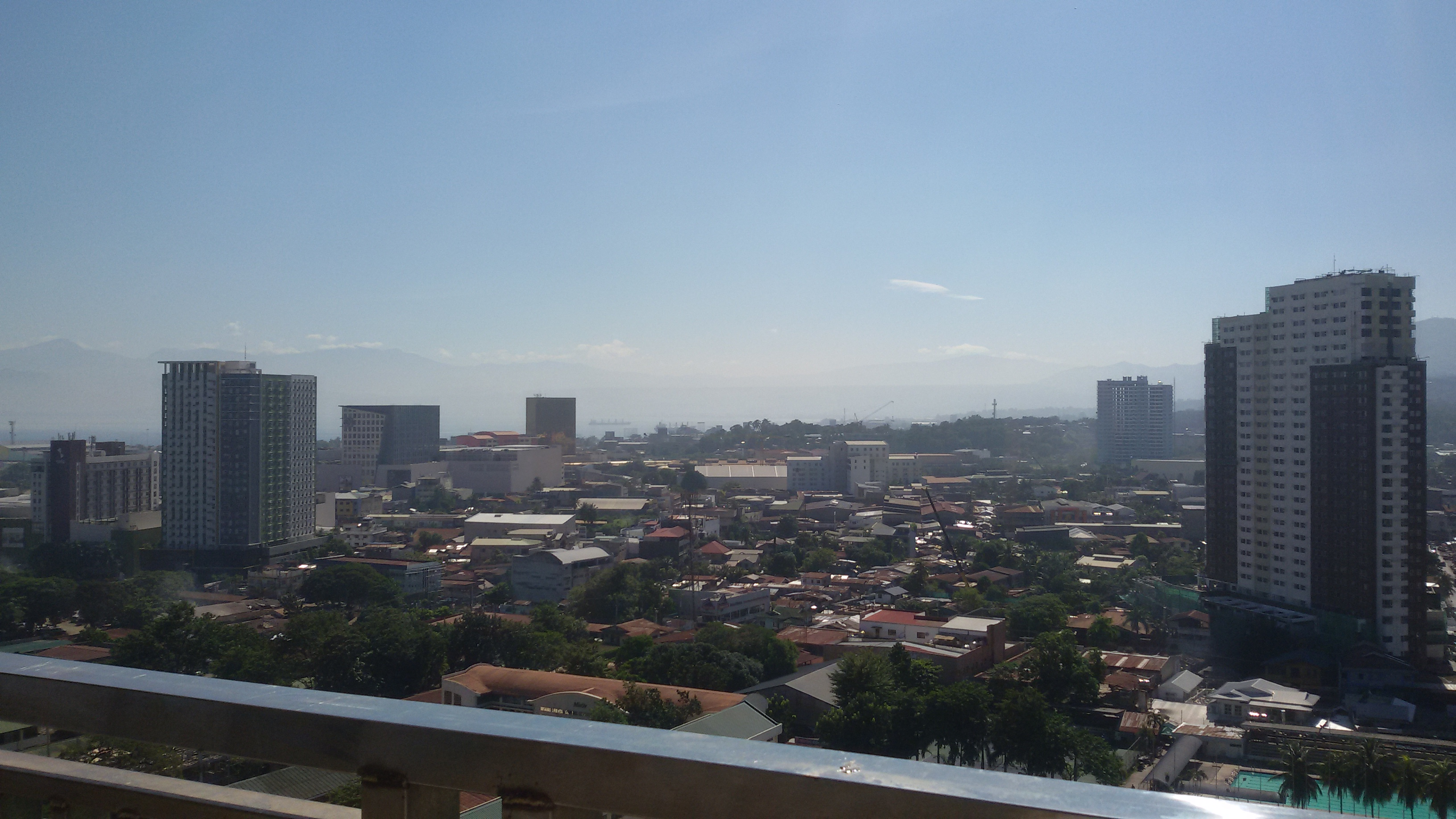
- (from top: left to right) Mount Balatukan, Balingoan Port, Mount Sumagaya, Libertad coastline, Macajalar Bay and Cagayan de Oro.

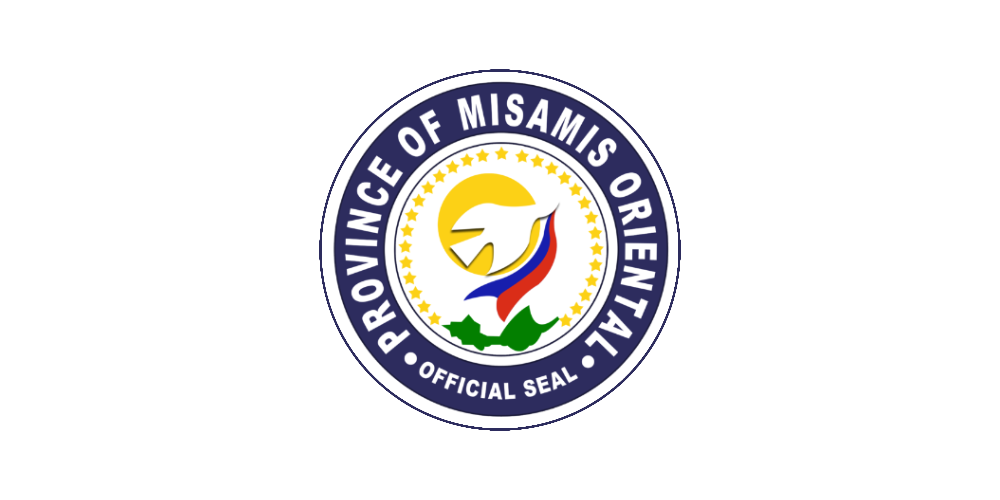
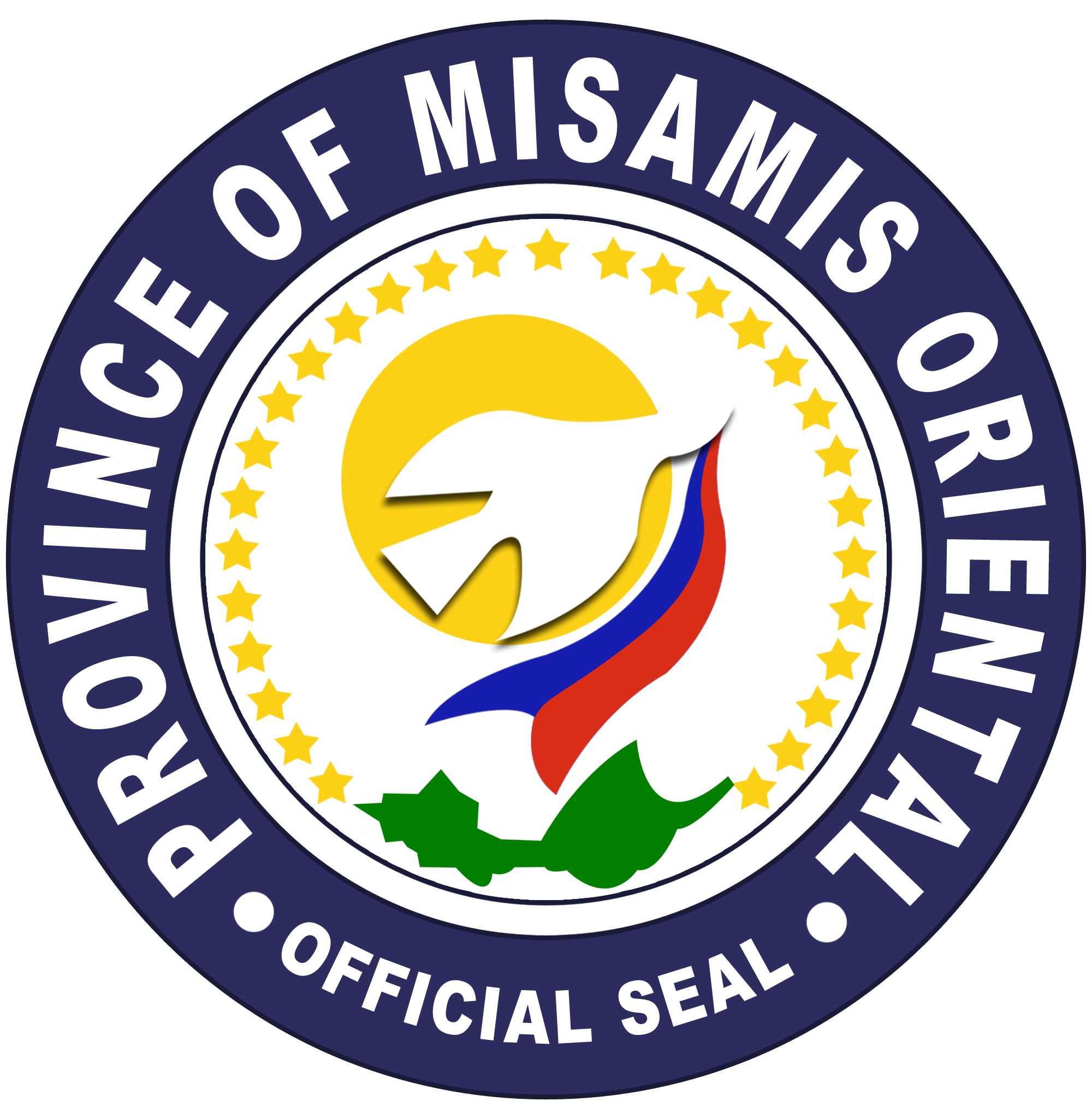
- Flag Seal
- Anthem: "Misamis Oriental Hymn"
- Location in the Philippines
- Interactive map of Misamis Oriental
- Coordinates: 8°45′N 125°00′E
- Country: Philippines
- Region: Northern Mindanao
- Founded: November 28, 1939
- Capital and largest city: Cagayan de Oro*

Government
  - Type: Sangguniang Panlalawigan
  - Governor: Juliette T. Uy (NUP)
  - Vice Governor: Jeremy Jonahmar G. Pelaez (Lakas)
  - Legislature: Misamis Oriental Provincial Board
  - Electorate: 1,106,297 voters (2025)

Area
  - Total: 3,131.52 km^{2} (1,209.09 sq mi)
  - Rank: 43rd out of 82
- (excluding Cagayan de Oro)
- Highest elevation (Mount Balatukan): 2,560 m (8,400 ft)

Population (2024 census)
  - Total: 988,065
  - Rank: 30th out of 82
  - Density: 315.522/km^{2} (817.200/sq mi)
  - Rank: 30th out of 82
  - Households: 230,233
- (excluding Cagayan de Oro)
- Demonym: East Misamisnon

Divisions
  - Independent cities: 1: Cagayan de Oro*
  - Component cities: 2: El Salvador; Gingoog
  - Municipalities: 23: Alubijid; Balingasag; Balingoan; Binuangan; Claveria; Gitagum; Initao; Jasaan; Kinoguitan; Lagonglong; Laguindingan; Libertad; Lugait; Magsaysay; Manticao; Medina; Naawan; Opol; Salay; Sugbongcogon; Tagoloan; Talisayan; Villanueva
  - Barangays: 424; including independent cities: 504
  - Districts: Legislative districts of Misamis Oriental; Legislative districts of Cagayan de Oro

Economy
  - Income class: 1st provincial income class
  - Poverty incidence: 12% (2023)
  - Revenue: ₱ 3,464 million (2024)
  - Assets: ₱ 8,904 million (2024)
  - Expenditure: ₱ 3,089 million (2024)
  - Liabilities: ₱ 3,689 million (2024)
- Time zone: UTC+8 (PST)
- PSGC: 104300000
- IDD : area code: +63 (0)88
- ISO 3166 code: PH-MSR
- Spoken languages: Cebuano; Higaonon; Subanon
- Website: www.misamisoriental.gov.ph
- * Cagayan de Oro is a highly-urbanized city, politically independent from Misamis Oriental.

Misamis Oriental (Cebuano: Sidlakang Misamis; Maranao: Sebangan Misamis; Filipino: Silangang Misamis), officially the Province of Misamis Oriental, is a province located in the region of Northern Mindanao in the Philippines. Its capital and largest city is Cagayan de Oro, the regional center of Northern Mindanao, which is geographically grouped but governed independently from the province.

== History ==
=== Spanish colonial era ===
Misamis Oriental shared a history with Misamis Occidental of being part of the Province of Cebu during the Spanish colonial era. In 1818, Misamis was carved out from Cebu to become a separate province and was further subdivided into partidos or divisions: Partido de Cagayan (Division of Cagayan), Partido de Catarman (Division of Catarman), Partido de Dapitan (Division of Dapitan), and Partido de Misamis (Division of Misamis). The new Misamis province was part of the districts of Mindanao during the later part of the 19th Century, with its territory spanning from Dapitan to the west, Gingoog to the East, and as far as Lanao and Cotabato to the south. On February 27, 1872, Spanish Governor General Carlos María de la Torre y Navacerrada issued a decree declaring Cagayan de Misamis the permanent capital of Misamis.

Misamis is one of the Spanish-controlled territories vulnerable to Moro raids. The Fuerza de la Concepcion y del Triunfo in Ozamiz was built as a Spanish military installation and one of the staging points in their expeditions against Moros. A fort in Balo-i in present-day Lanao del Norte was also constructed in 1891 on the orders of General Valeriano Weyler in its renewed campaign against the Maranaos. The Fuerza de San Miguel in Iligan was also built, serving as a muster point for Spanish forces in their campaigns in Lanao. Undivided Misamis, had 3 pure Spanish-Filipino civilian families and 35 mixed Spanish-Filipino Mestizo civilian families. It was also fortified and colonized by 100 Spanish soldiers.

=== American colonial era ===
==== Misamis province ====
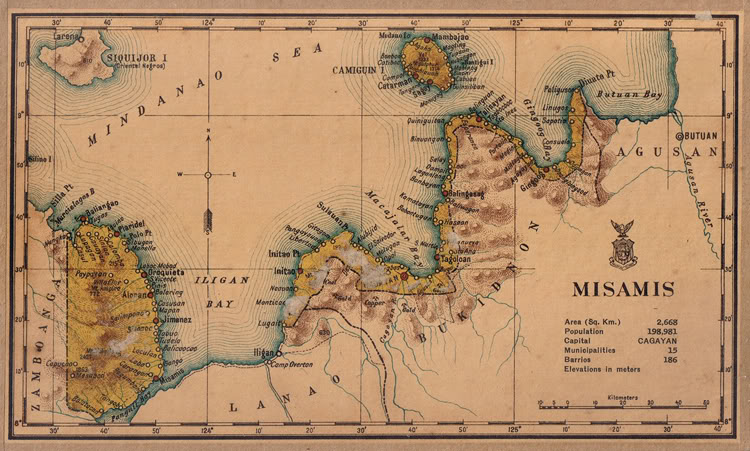
Misamis province map in 1918

With the organization of the Department of Mindanao and Sulu in 1917, Misamis lost a territory covering Iligan and coastal towns along Iligan and Panguil bays to become part of the Lanao province, making the remaining western and eastern territories of Misamis isolated from each other. Highland areas south of Cagayan de Misamis down to Malaybalay area were carved out to become a sub-province of Bukidnon in 1914, then eventually a full province in 1917. During this period migrants from Luzon and Visayas then flocked to the area to seek new and better life and various economic opportunities. Most of them are

Legislative Act. No. 3537 approved on November 2, 1929, divided the province of Misamis into two due to the lack of geographic contiguity. It was not until a decade later, on November 28, 1939, that the division between Misamis Oriental and Misamis Occidental was implemented by Act. No. 3777. When Misamis Oriental separated, Don Gregorio Pelaez became its first governor.

=== Japanese occupation ===
In 1942, at the onset of World War II in the Philippines, Japanese soldiers landed in Misamis Oriental to occupy the region. Filipino and American resistance guerrillas operated in the hills and forests of Misamis Oriental and Bukidnon, and both provinces fell under the jurisdiction of the 10th Military District commanded by Colonel Wendell Fertig.

The American liberation forces landed in Cagayan in May 1945, with the support of the Filipino and American guerrillas based in Opol, Gingoog, and Tagoloan clearing the beachhead of Japanese defenders for the liberation forces to land.

=== Philippine independence ===
Subsequent creations of new local government units in the province occurred after the war. Opol and El Salvador were barangays of Cagayan, but due to their relative isolation from the Cagayan town proper, the residents petitioned for their separation to become municipalities in 1948. El Salvador became a municipality within the same year, while Opol was carved out from Cagayan in 1950, the same year the latter was chartered to become a city. Lagonglong was organized as a separate municipality out of the 11 sitios of Balingasag which were then grouped into 5 barangays. Villanueva was created out of the 5 barrios of Tagoloan in 1962, and the municipality of Libertad out of the 6 barrios of Initao in 1963.

The island of Camiguin was part of the province, and in 1958 it was made into a sub-province. The island eventually separated from Misamis Oriental and achieved regular province status in 1966, with Mambajao as its new provincial capital.

=== Martial law era ===
The 21-year administration of Ferdinand Marcos, which included 14 years of one-man rule under Marcos, saw the rise of ethnic conflicts and the overall degradation of peace and order throughout Mindanao - first in the form of conflicts between local Mindanaoan Muslims and Christian settlers which the Marcos administration had encouraged first to migrate and then to form militias, and later in the form of Muslim secessionist movements arising from outrage after the 1986 Jabidah massacre.

Additionally, an economic crisis in late 1969 led to social unrest throughout the country, and violent crackdowns on protests led to the radicalization of many students, with some joining the New People's Army, bringing the Communist rebellion to Mindanao.

During this time, Initao, Misamis Oriental was the site of the Holy Temple of Power of the Christian settler cult named Sagrado Corazon Senor (Sacred Heart of the Lord), which became better known as Tadtad (literally "to chop") because of their violent actions, and was one of numerous cults tapped by Marcos' military as force multipliers in their efforts against the Muslim secessionists and the communists.

In September 1972, Marcos was nearing the end of this last term allowed under the Philippines 1935 constitution when he placed the entirety of the Philippines under Martial Law, a period historically remembered for its human rights abuses, particularly targeting political opponents, student activists, journalists, religious workers, farmers, and others who fought against the Marcos dictatorship. Only about 170 survivors from Northern Mindanao - including Misamis Oriental - were fortunate to live long enough to receive legally mandated compensation in the mid-2010s.

Others were not as fortunate, such as labor leader Julieta Cupino-Armea, a key figure in the Labor sector resistance against the Marcos dictatorship in Mindanao whom records show was "tortured, raped, beaten with wood all over her body" for four hours by the Tadtad before she finally died. Cupino-Armea would later be recognized as one of the martyrs of the fight to restore Philippine democracy when her name was inscribed on the wall of remembrance of the Philippines' Bantayog ng mga Bayani (lit. "Monument of Heroes") in Quezon city. Another figure killed in Misamis Oriental and honored at the Bantayog ng mga Bayani was Gingoog City Councillor Renato Bucag, who was head of the opposition PDP–Laban party in Gingoog City until he, his wife, and 11-year old son were assaulted and murdered at their farm on the outskirts of the city just two weeks before the 1984 Philippine parliamentary election.

=== Contemporary ===
The municipality of El Salvador became a component city by virtue of Republic Act No. 9435 which sought to convert the municipality into a city. The law was ratified on June 15, 2007. However, the cityhood status was lost twice in the years 2008 and 2010 after the LCP questioned the validity of the cityhood law. The cityhood status was reaffirmed after the court finalized its ruling on February 15, 2011 which declared the cityhood law constitutional.

In May 2014 it was reported that an area in Barangay Lapad in Laguindingan, Misamis Oriental, in northern Mindanao, was declared a heritage site. Oyster fossils older than 200,000 years were discovered, according to Balita Pilipinas. Property owner, Raul Ilogon, told Balita Pilipinas that they had been seeing the fossils for 20 years thinking that they were ordinary rocks.

== Geography ==
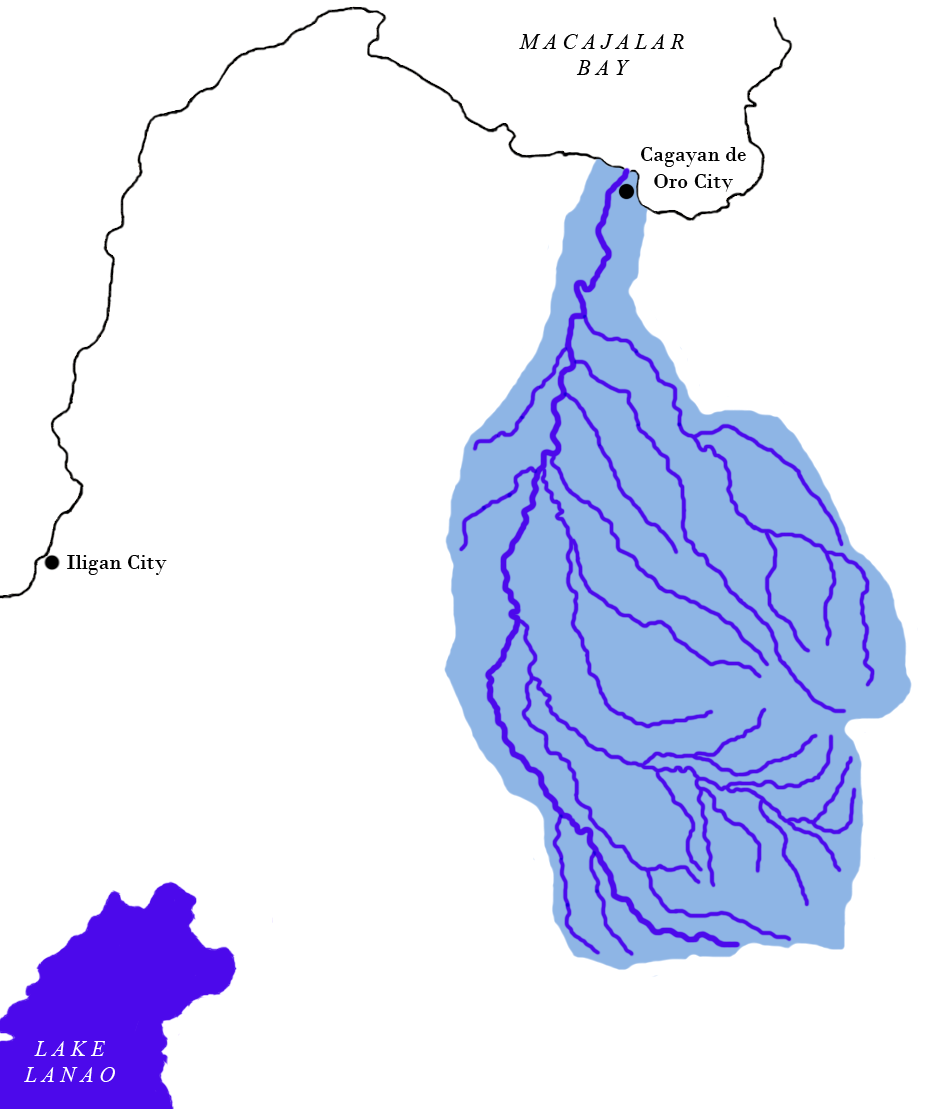
The Cagayan de Oro River and its major tributaries.

Located in Northern Mindanao, the province borders Bukidnon to the south, Agusan del Norte and Agusan del Sur to the east and Lanao del Norte to the west. On the north is the Bohol Sea with the island-province of Camiguin just off its northern coast.

Misamis Oriental occupies a total land area of 3,131.52 square kilometres (1,209.09 sq mi). When the independent city of Cagayan de Oro is included for geographical purposes, the province's land area is 3,544.32 square kilometres (1,368.47 sq mi).

Misamis Oriental, as a coastal province, is dominated by two bays to the north; the Macajalar and the Gingoog Bay. The central portion of the province features several rivers originating from the highlands of Bukidnon, such as the Cagayan.

=== Administrative divisions ===
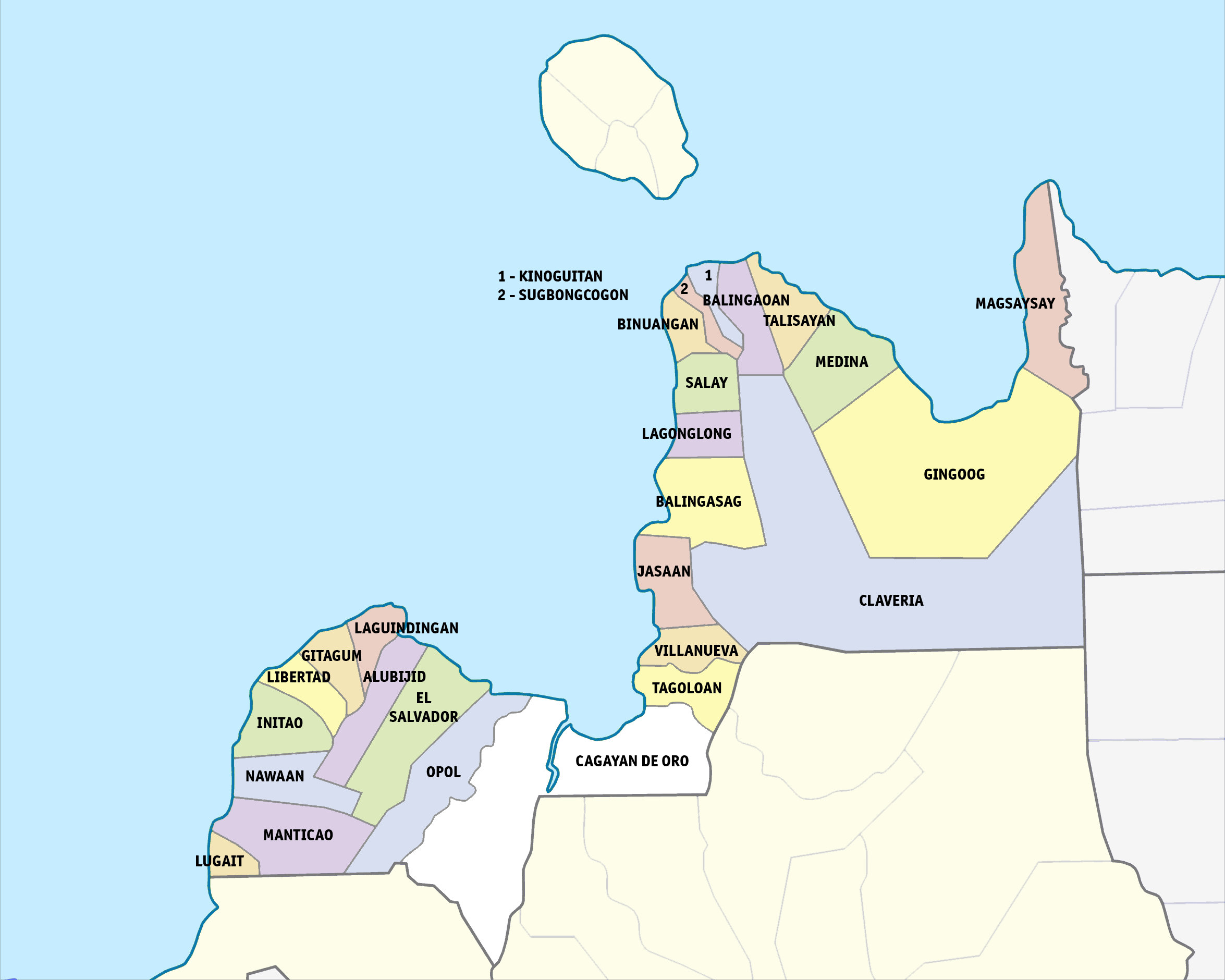
Political map of Misamis Oriental

Misamis Oriental comprises 23 municipalities and 2 component cities, which are organized into three legislative districts and further subdivided into 424 barangays. The provincial capital, Cagayan de Oro, is a highly urbanized city that is administered independently from the province.

- † Provincial capital and highly urbanized city
- ∗ Component city
- Municipality

City or municipality		District	Population			±% p.a.	Area		Density		Barangay	Coordinates^{[A]}
			(2020)		(2015)		km^{2}	sq mi	/km^{2}	/sq mi		
Alubijid		3rd	3.4%	32,163	29,724	+1.51%	85.56	33.03	380	980	16	8°34′13″N 124°28′16″E
Balingasag		1st	7.8%	74,385	67,059	+1.99%	147.11	56.80	510	1,300	30	8°44′34″N 124°46′28″E
Balingoan		1st	1.2%	11,020	11,051	−0.05%	57.80	22.32	190	490	9	9°00′15″N 124°50′47″E
Binuangan		1st	0.8%	7,441	7,515	−0.19%	30.43	11.75	240	620	8	8°55′08″N 124°47′02″E
Cagayan de Oro	†	2 LD	—	728,402	675,950	+1.43%	412.80	159.38	1,800	4,700	80	8°29′03″N 124°38′50″E
Claveria		2nd	5.5%	52,478	48,906	+1.35%	579.63	223.80	91	240	24	8°36′44″N 124°53′34″E
El Salvador	∗	2nd	6.1%	58,771	50,204	+3.05%	106.15	40.98	550	1,400	15	8°33′40″N 124°31′28″E
Gingoog	∗	1st	14.3%	136,698	124,648	+1.77%	568.44	219.48	240	620	79	8°49′29″N 125°06′13″E
Gitagum		3rd	1.9%	17,920	16,373	+1.73%	43.40	16.76	410	1,100	11	8°35′40″N 124°24′21″E
Initao		3rd	3.5%	33,902	32,370	+0.88%	111.27	42.96	300	780	16	8°29′51″N 124°18′20″E
Jasaan		2nd	6.0%	57,055	54,478	+0.88%	77.02	29.74	740	1,900	15	8°39′06″N 124°45′13″E
Kinoguitan		1st	1.5%	14,091	14,391	−0.40%	42.56	16.43	330	850	15	8°59′04″N 124°47′35″E
Lagonglong		1st	2.5%	24,190	21,659	+2.13%	83.78	32.35	290	750	10	8°48′20″N 124°47′27″E
Laguindingan		3rd	2.8%	26,363	24,405	+1.48%	44.23	17.08	600	1,600	11	8°34′29″N 124°26′27″E
Libertad		3rd	1.4%	12,948	12,354	+0.90%	22.47	8.68	580	1,500	9	8°33′28″N 124°21′12″E
Lugait		3rd	2.1%	20,559	19,758	+0.76%	27.45	10.60	750	1,900	8	8°20′34″N 124°15′39″E
Magsaysay		1st	3.8%	36,803	34,605	+1.18%	143.14	55.27	260	670	25	9°01′11″N 125°10′53″E
Manticao		3rd	3.1%	29,469	28,422	+0.69%	123.01	47.49	240	620	13	8°24′01″N 124°17′31″E
Medina		1st	3.7%	35,612	32,907	+1.52%	148.29	57.26	240	620	19	8°54′41″N 125°01′26″E
Naawan		3rd	2.3%	22,444	21,213	+1.08%	88.50	34.17	250	650	10	8°26′01″N 124°17′27″E
Opol		2nd	6.9%	66,327	61,503	+1.45%	175.13	67.62	380	980	14	8°31′16″N 124°34′29″E
Salay		1st	3.1%	29,998	28,705	+0.84%	92.79	35.83	320	830	18	8°53′00″N 124°49′00″E
Sugbongcogon		1st	1.0%	9,764	9,226	+1.08%	26.50	10.23	370	960	10	8°57′22″N 124°47′14″E
Tagoloan		2nd	8.4%	80,319	73,150	+1.80%	117.73	45.46	680	1,800	10	8°32′21″N 124°45′14″E
Talisayan		1st	2.7%	25,761	24,505	+0.96%	140.33	54.18	180	470	18	8°59′45″N 124°53′01″E
Villanueva		2nd	4.2%	40,419	39,378	+0.50%	48.80	18.84	830	2,100	11	8°35′09″N 124°46′13″E
Total^{[B]}				956,900	888,509	+1.42%	3,131.52	1,209.09	310	800	424	(see GeoGroup box)
1. Coordinates mark the town center, and are sortable by latitude.; 2. Total figures exclude the highly urbanized city of Cagayan de Oro.

== Biodiversity ==
Misamis Oriental is rich in biodiversity. The Indigenous Higaonon community helps protect the natural environment on the forests of Misamis Oriental and Bukidnon. A study by the Mindanao State University attributes the biodiversity on Mount Sumagaya to the Indigenous management strategy and sustainable agriculture practiced by the Higaonon. Higaonon ancestral lands are threatened by land grabbing and land clearing.

Mount Sumagaya hosts at least 52 floral species from 19 families, including many that are considered economically and socially significant to the Higaonon people. It has a high floral diversity and is home to a threatened carnivorous pitcher plant that was first discovered in 2014. It is also home to 22 endemic species of birds, including the Philippine eagle. It also hosts various mammals, reptiles, and amphibians.

== Demographics ==
Population census of Misamis Oriental

Year	Pop.	±% p.a.
1903	56,477	—
1918	82,114	+2.53%
1939	173,007	+3.61%
1948	300,072	+6.31%
1960	343,898	+1.14%
1970	344,437	+0.02%

Year	Pop.	±% p.a.
1975	395,270	+2.80%
1980	462,720	+3.20%
1990	525,453	+1.28%
1995	587,551	+2.12%
2000	664,338	+2.67%
2007	748,885	+1.67%

Year	Pop.	±% p.a.
2010	813,856	+3.07%
2015	888,509	+1.69%
2020	956,900	+1.57%
2024	988,065	+0.77%

(excluding Cagayan de Oro)
Source: Philippine Statistics Authority

The population of Misamis Oriental in the 2024 census was 988,065 people, with a density of 320 inhabitants per square kilometre or 830 inhabitants per square mile. When Cagayan de Oro is included for geographical purposes, the province's population is 1,564,459 people, with a density of 441/km^{2} (1,143/sq mi).

=== Ethnicities and languages ===
Although the native inhabitants of Misamis Oriental are Higaonons, Binukid and Manobo, the majority of the province's residents descended from earlier non-native Visayan Christian settlers from Cebu, Bohol, Negros Oriental, Siquijor and nearby Camiguin, accounting for 95.97% of the province's population. The rest of the residents are native Higaonons, Binukid, Manobos (who became minorities in their own homeland because of the non-native Visayan majority) and neighboring Subanens (native to neighboring provinces of Lanao del Norte and Misamis Occidental), as well as other Christian settlers (and their native-born descendants) from Ilocandia, Cagayan Valley, Cordillera Administrative Region, Calabarzon, Central Luzon, and Bicolandia in Luzon, and Panay and Negros Occidental in Visayas who came during the late Spanish colonial period and since the American colonial and postwar eras. These non-native settlers are informally called Dumagats, from the root word "dagat" (literally means "sea" or "ocean") because they dwell among the province's coastline upon landing from Luzon and Visayas by boats or later by ships, causing indigenous Higaonons to relocate to the mountains to avoid contact with these newcomers.

Cebuano is the primary spoken language of Misamis Oriental, with the vast majority claiming it to be their mother tongue. There are also sizeable speakers of Bohol dialect of Cebuano in the province. A unique Cebuano dialect spoken in or around the municipality of Jasaan is called Jasaanon. The province include the native Binukid, Higaonon, Subanon, as well as Maguindanaon and Tausug.

=== Religion ===
==== Catholicism ====
Roman Catholic Christianity predominates in the province with roughly 68% of the population. Other Christian denominations compose most of the minority religions that forms 9% of the population with 28% belongs to Iglesia Filipina Independiente (IFI or Aglipayan Church).

==== Others ====
The rest belongs to Members Church of God International (MCGI), Iglesia ni Cristo, Pentecostal church, Evangelical churches, Baptist church, United Church of Christ in the Philippines (UCCP), Seventh Day Adventist church, Episcopal church, and Presbyterian church, while Islam has a small but steadily increasing number.

== Economy ==
Poverty incidence of Misamis Oriental (%)

Source: Philippine Statistics Authority

The province is host to industries such as agricultural, forest, steel, metal, chemical, mineral, rubber and food processing. It is home to the 30 square kilometre PHIVIDEC Industrial Estate and the Mindanao International Container Port, all in Tagoloan. Del Monte Philippines, which exports pineapples all over the Asia-Pacific region, has a processing plant in Cagayan de Oro.

On January 10, 2008, Hanjin Heavy Industries and Construction Company of South Korea inked a contract to build a $2 billion shipyard building complex at Villanueva, Misamis Oriental with the PHIVIDEC Industrial Authority. It is bigger than Hanjin's $1 billion shipyard complex in Subic and Olongapo which will hire 20,000 Filipinos to manufacture ship parts. The government declared the 441.8-hectare project site an economic zone (part of 3,000-hectare industrial estate managed by PHIVIDEC).

== Government ==
Seal of the province, in use since 1928 and was registered in NHCP in 1950. Still recognized as the official seal of the province by NHCP as of 2018.

Misamis Oriental Provincial Government 2022-2025

=== Executive officials ===
- Congressmen:
  - 1st District of Misamis Oriental with Gingoog: Jennifer "Karen" A. Lagbas (NUP)
  - 2nd District of Misamis Oriental with El Salvador: Yevgeny Vicente B. Emano (Nacionalista Party)
- Governor: Juliette T. Uy (NUP)
- Vice Governor: Jeremy Jonahmar G. Pelaez (Padayon)

=== Members of the Sangguniang Panlalawigan ===
- 1st District:
  - Rommel C. Maslog (Lakas–CMD)
  - Marlon C. Kho (Lakas–CMD)
  - Rey B. Buhisan (Lakas–CMD)
  - Roy E. Aniscal (Lakas–CMD)
  - Jabi Abing I. Bernaldez (Lakas–CMD)
- 2nd District:
  - Syremae N. Emano (Padayon)
  - Nancy S. Madjos (Padayon)
  - Dexter B. Yasay (Padayon)
  - Princess N. Emano (NUP)
  - Bliss Francis J. Acain (Nacionalista)
- Sectoral
  - Robert J. De Lara - ABC President (Non-partisan)
  - Michelle Anayron - PCL President (PDP–Laban)
  - Mary Kate Temple - SK Federation President (Non-partisan)
  - Alan Mandokita - IPMR (Non-partisan)

== See also ==
- Misamis Occidental
- Misamis
