= Mindanao Railway =

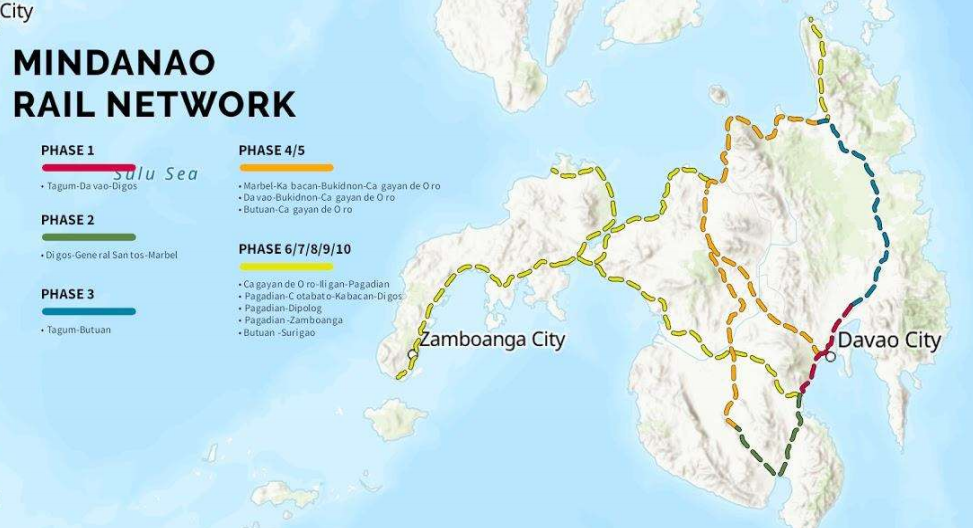
- System map of the Mindanao Railway as of 2021, including all phases.

Overview
- Status: Under preliminary studies
- Owner: Department of Transportation
- Locale: Mindanao

Service
- Operator: Philippine National Railways
- Rolling stock: Electric multiple units
- Daily ridership: 130,000 (estimated)

History
- Planned opening: TBA

Technical
- Line length: 1,544 km (959 mi)
- Track length: 2,278 km (1,415 mi)
- Num of tracks: Double track
- Character: Grade separated
- Track gauge: 1,435 mm (4 ft 8½ in)
- Electrification: Overhead
- Operating speed: 200 km/h (125 mph)
- Signalling: ETCS Level 1

The Mindanao Railway, previously known as the Trans-Mindanao High Speed Railway, is a proposed railway system in Mindanao, the southernmost major island of the Philippines. Originally proposed in 1936 as part of Manuel L. Quezon's efforts to strengthen the presence of Commonwealth government in Mindanao against the rising influence of Imperial Japan before World War II, the line was shelved. Other proposals and studies were made in the 1950s, 1990s, and the 2000s, but never materialized. The current line began development in 2018; however, construction has yet to start.

The system will be constructed as a network 1,544 km (959 mi) long in its present form, totalling 2,278 km (1,415 mi) of track, with the centerpiece being a circumferential mainline that connects some of the major cities of the island. An east–west radial mainline will also be built to the Zamboanga Peninsula, and a number of other radial lines will serve as branch lines. As with other projects of the Philippine National Railways, the Mindanao Railway will be constructed in phases covering segments of various lengths.

The first phase, the Tagum–Digos segment of the circumferential mainline, will be the first section to be constructed. This segment was initially set to be partially opened by 2022, with the rest of its 17 segments being completed by the 2030s, but the entire project has been beset by delays with funding and construction. An official development assistance (ODA) loan from China was planned for funding most of the project; however, the Philippine government backed out of pursuing it in 2023. While the project is still stalled, the government is starting again on the project in 2024. A fresh feasibility study was conducted by the Asian Development Bank (ADB). Another proposal is the second phase (originally Phase 3), or the Northern Mindanao Railway, a 54.8-kilometer high-capacity line connecting Cagayan de Oro, connecting the municipalities of Laguindingan and Villanueva, Misamis Oriental, which is under study from the Public-Private Partnership (PPP) Center.

== History ==
=== Historical railways ===
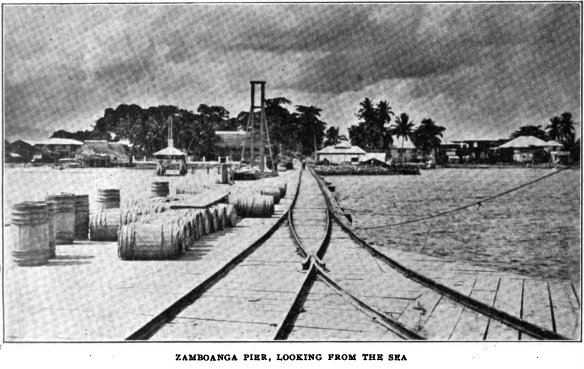
A pier with railroad in Zamboanga City (1906)

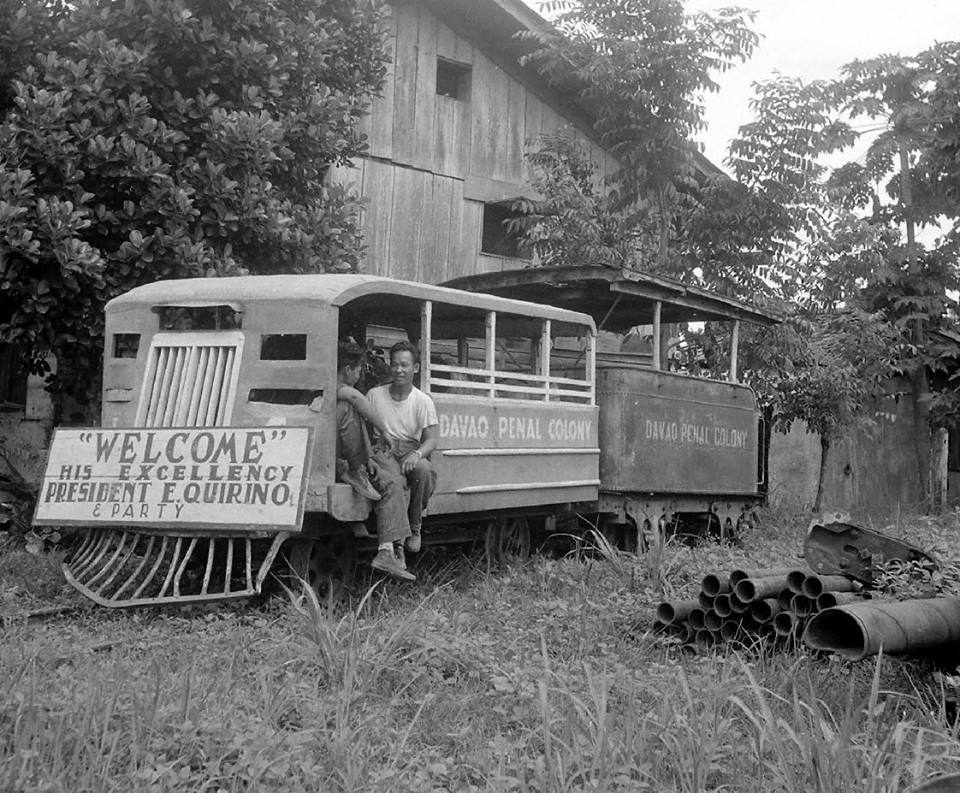
President Elpidio Quirino's welcoming train in the Davao Penal Colony, taken prior to 1953.

The first attempt to construct a rail line in Mindanao was made in the 1890s, when the Spanish colonial government attempted to build a Decauville railway between Iligan and Marawi. However, this was never finished.

Not long after, a series of narrow-gauge railroads were opened by the American government in Mindanao. These short lines were constructed to transport supplies and United States Army personnel. A line was opened in Camp Keithley in what is now Marawi where trains carried war materiel on flatcars. A 2 ft (610 mm) gauge short line was also opened in Jolo, Sulu.

The best-documented system built by the government was the single-track line of the Davao Penal Colony in Davao del Norte. The prison was established in 1932 by the American government. It was converted into a facility for American POWs after its occupation by Imperial Japanese Army forces in 1942. Davao Penal Colony survivor Raymond C. Heimbuch wrote in his book that the line suffered from poor condition of the rolling stock and lack of maintenance of the tracks. There were 40 flatcars and a sole diesel locomotive, which replaced a steam locomotive whose tender survived after the war. The diesel locomotive would pair with 5 or 6 flatcars that carried prisoners, sacks of rice, or forestry products. The train took a 45-minute trip per way. According to an interview with POW survivor Hayes Bolitho in 2009, the line is estimated to be 7 km (4.3 mi) long. He also commented that prisoners were forced to push the train in case of rain or when ascending steep grades due to the poor conditions of the tracks. A few years after the war, a two-car train welcomed the party of then-president Elpidio Quirino during his visit to the area.

At the same time, local plantations and lumber mills also built their own systems during the 1920s and the 1930s, typically serving freight trains from the production facilities to a port. At Port Lamon, Surigao del Norte, trains carried timber from the jungle and sawmill to the pier. One Class B Shay locomotive was used by the Kolambugan Lumber and Development Company of Lanao del Norte during the 1920s and the 1930s. In Malabang, Lanao del Sur, a local company also ran freight trains through the town during the 1930s. In Misamis Oriental, the Anakan Lumber Company operated Heisler locomotives in the town of Gingoog during the 1920s and 1930s.

These short lines were either destroyed during World War II or dismantled (the Davao Penal Colony line was dismantled due to its condition sometime after President Quirino's visit). The metal used was then sold to the Chinese black market due to the high market value of iron there. Despite closures of local freight railroads due to the rise of truck traffic, one line was established in the Davao Region by the Tagum Agricultural Development Company (TADECO). It started operations in 1950 and had two diesel locomotives that hauled abacá and Cavendish banana produce. The locomotives were decommissioned and stored in 2010.

=== Initial proposals ===
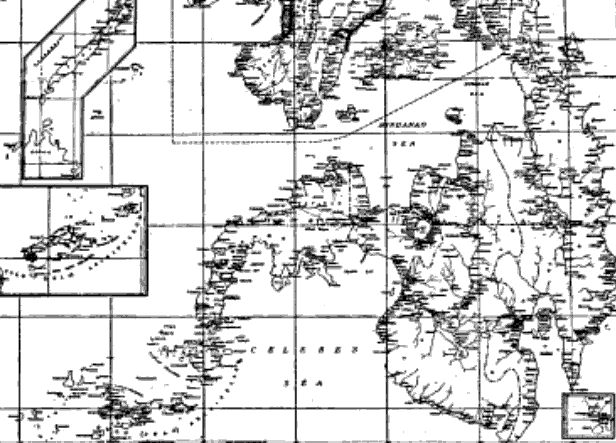
Early proposals for rail lines in Mindanao in 1906.

Proposals for the Mindanao Railway were published by the Daily Bulletin and The Far Eastern Review as early as August 1906. These proposed corridors include those surrounding Cotabato, Davao City, Lake Lanao, and Sulu. There were no proposed interconnections between these four lines due to the technology and rather low population density of the region during that time.

Then-president Manuel L. Quezon proposed the construction of an electrified railroad between Cagayan de Oro (then known as Misamis) and Davao City passing through the province of Bukidnon. It would have been electrified by overhead lines powered by the Maria Cristina Falls' hydroelectric power plant (now the Agus VI Hydroeletric Plant). This proposal was made in January 1936, and was taken note by Quezon's adviser Francis Burton Harrison. Some track bed construction began the same year, but the project was left incomplete without a single track placed when construction was halted in 1940.

After the war, Manila Railroad General Manager and later-Senator Prospero Sanidad proposed a standard-gauge railway in 1952 with consideration for a future electrified network. A network 1,170 kilometers (730 miles) long was proposed for construction with the assistance of American firm De Leuw, Cather and Company.

The following lines were proposed, each at least 100 kilometres (62 miles) long:

1. Davao City – Kibawe, Bukidnon (100 km)
2. Cagayan de Oro – Kibawe (140 km)—The route would have also passed by Malaybalay.
3. Cotabato City – Kibawe (120 km)—A branch line would have passed by Parang, Maguindanao del Norte.
4. Nasipit, Agusan del Norte – Santa Josefa, Agusan del Sur (120 km)—A branch line would have passed by Butuan.
5. Butuan – Surigao City (100 km)
6. Davao City – Santa Josefa (110 km)
7. Iligan – Kibawe (110 km)—A station would have also been built in the area of Dansalan.
8. Makar – Midsayap, Cotabato (150 km)—The area referred in this study as Makar is now divided between General Santos and T'Boli, South Cotabato.
9. Davao City – Makar (110 km)
10. Bislig – Santa Josefa (50 km)—A branch of Segment 4.

According to this older plan, Kibawe (then known as Kibawa) and Davao City were the main hubs for the network. Although never realized, it influenced the right-of-way of the present Mindanao Railway proposal, particularly on the circumferential main line.

==== Mindanao and the Philippine National Railway ====
When the Philippine National Railway (PNR) was created by virtue of Republic Act 4156 in 1964, establishment of a railway in Mindanao was made part of its mandate. Section 5 of the law explicitly stated that ₱50 million had been allocated for the survey and establishment of a railway on the island. When Republic Act 4156 was superseded by Republic Act 6366 in 1971, the same explicit mandate to create a Mindanao Railway, under the PNR, remained.

However, when the law enabling the PNR was amended by Presidential Decree 741 in July 1975, reference to a railway in Mindanao was omitted.

==== Return of the Mindanao Railway to the national agenda ====
On December 15, 1992, Fidel Ramos signed Memorandum Circular No. 23 which directed the formulation of the Medium-Term Philippine Development Plan 1993–1998. Section 4.4.2 of this plan focused on Transportation. Sub-paragraph "M" called for a feasibility study for the Mindanao Railway under a Build Operate Transfer (BOT) arrangement.

==== From the Mindanao Railway System Task Force to the Mindanao Railway Project Office ====
President Joseph Estrada created the Presidential Committee on Flagship Programs and Projects to identify projects for the administration. On October 7, 1998, the committee directed the Philippine National Railways, Public Estates Authority, and the Southern Philippine Development Authority to conduct preparatory studies for the Mindanao Railway System.

On June 28, 1999, Estrada signed Administrative Order 74, series of 1999 which allocated ₱10 million to the Mindanao Rail System Task Force to, as stated in the order, "act as the clearing house for policy and operational issues affecting the implementation of the MRS Project".

However, on February 11, 2002—after Estrada's impeachment the year before—President Gloria Macapagal Arroyo signed Executive Order 72, series 2002, which abolished the MRS Task Force. Later, however, Arroyo replaced the task force with another organization.

On May 25, 2006, President Gloria Macapagal Arroyo signed Executive Order 536 which created the Cebu Railway Project Office (CRPO) and the Mindanao Railway Project Office (MRPO) under the control of the Department of Transportation and Communication (DOTC). Both were charged formulating plans for, identifying funding mechanisms for, and developing railways in Metro Cebu and Mindanao, respectively.

==== Mindanao Strategic Railway Development Plan ====
The government made numerous studies and technical assessments during the 1990s. In the early 2000s, the Mindanao Strategic Railway Development Plan was formulated. The planned railway, with a total length of 1,533 km (953 mi), was designed to span the entire island in a loop and was estimated to cost ₱66.5 billion. The plan for a railway divided into four phases: Laguindingan to Cagayan de Oro, Cagayan de Oro to Tagoloan, Laguindingan to Iligan, and Iligan to Linamon. The network would have linked urban centers across the island and was aimed to cut the 90-minute travel time by bus between Cagayan de Oro and Iligan to 15–20 minutes. The project was slated to start construction in 2011, and Saudi Arabia expressed interest in funding the project. The project was later discontinued.

==== 2010s ====
As part of the updated 2011–2016 Philippine Development Plan, ₱400 million (US$8.85 million) was allotted for conducting feasibility studies to develop infrastructure projects such as railways and roads. In 2014, there were debates on whether the system would be privately managed or run by the Philippine National Railways, which intermittently operated inter-city rail services in Luzon at the time.

The Japan International Cooperation Agency (JICA) and the National Economic and Development Authority conducted studies for the construction of a rail system in the island of Mindanao along with its partners starting in 2015. The proposal in 2015 resembled the 1952 right-of-way. The government planned to build the railway in six phases, with the first running from Iligan to Gingoog. A pre-proposal conference was conducted in 2015, but the railway was not included in the Public-Private Partnership program.

=== Development ===
==== Phase 1 ====
The railway in its present form began development in the late 2010s. While JICA was conducting initial studies, then-presidential candidate Rodrigo Duterte supported the construction of the railway. Upon Duterte's election, he aimed to begin construction of the first phase between the cities of Tagum and Digos by 2017 and open it partially before the end of his term in 2022, which did not happen due to rampant corruption. In 2018, the project, initially called the Trans-Mindanao High Speed Railway, was approved and received initial funding from Congress. The rest of the funding would have come from an official development assistance (ODA) loan from China. However, construction was delayed after several eminent domain issues, specifically after residents of a high-end gated community near Davao City has requested the Department of Transportation (DOTr) to realign the railway line to avoid hitting an 18-hole golf course.

The railway's route was modified into a system centered around a circular mainline. However, it was later reverted into the old right-of-way, but now incorporates the extensions and branch lines featured in the 2019 proposal. In its current state, the project has 18 segments to be divided into 10 phases.

On March 24, 2021, the DOTr Undersecretary for Project Implementation in Mindanao, Eymard Eje, Tagum mayor Allan Rellon, and Carmen mayor Virginia Perandos signed a deed of absolute sale for land to be used for the construction of the Tagumpay Train Village, a resettlement area for families affected by the project. As of April 2021, land acquisition from Panabo to Carmen was almost complete. On April 19, 2021, the city government of Panabo issued an ordinance prohibiting any unrelated construction on the right-of-way of the Mindanao Railway.

The Project Management Consultant Contract for the Tagum–Davao–Digos segment of the project was signed on October 20, 2021. It was also announced that the final length of the system would be 1,544 km (959 mi).

In July 2022, the project funding was withdrawn after the Chinese government failed to act on the funding requests by the Duterte administration, including the Subic–Clark Railway (later Subic–Clark–Manila–Batangas Railway under a new initiative) and PNR South Long Haul projects. A month later, on August 11, Chinese Ambassador to the Philippines Huang Xilian and Transport Secretary Jaime Bautista held formal talks ending in an agreement to restart negotiations for the three railway projects.

On September 30, 2022, the DOTr said that the project could be finished by 2028 if the loan for the project was finalized by 2023. However, on October 25, 2023, the Philippine government declared that it had formally withdrawn its request for Chinese ODA funding. A day later, on the sidelines of the German-Philippine Chamber of Commerce and Industry forum in Makati, Bautista stated that the country can still seek assistance from other ODA partners like JICA, ADB, and the World Bank.

After China withdrew from funding the project in 2024, the government decided to re-study the first phase of the project with the inclusion of freight services as part of its adjustments to the DOTr, and at the same time, the transportation department revamped the feasibility study of the project to use environmentally friendly or electric trains. At the same time, JICA announced that the funding decision for the project is not ready yet as it awaits the completion of a feasibility study with the revised project.

In July of that year, 3 foreign firms expressed interest in pursuing the project. Mindanao Development Authority Secretary Leo Tereso Magno said that there were 2 Korean and 1 Japanese firms their willingness to design and build the said project. In November, Vice President Sara Duterte lamented the delay of the construction of the railway and made the pronouncement in a press conference in Butuan when asked that regarding the development, particularly its rumored cancellation. The pre-construction activities are still ongoing.

As of May 2025, there has yet to be any advancements, and DOTr Secretary Vince Dizon stated: “Yes, these projects remain in the priority list of the President and in the priority list of the DOTr. However, it is difficult to say if we don’t have the funding yet. We cannot program a timeline for them,”. Nonetheless, the project is currently undergoing a revised feasibility study conducted by the ADB, via the Infrastructure Preparation and Innovation Facility. According to Dizon, "We will try our best to look for funds for the Mindanao Railway,".

Romeo Montenegro, the Assistant Secretary of MinDA, articulated that the initiative remains within the jurisdiction of the DOTr for further study. Montenegro recognized the public's dissatisfaction regarding the project's protracted advancement. In addressing the inquiry concerning the completion timeline of the railway prior to the current administration ends, it is noteworthy that the government is considering a PPP model.

In September, the DOTr mentioned that studies are still in progress, with the ADB, France, India, and South Korea expressing interest in this project. They aim to complete the study by 2026. The agency failed to include the project in that year's budget.

The government declared the relocation of the 178 families in November 2025. However, Senator Alan Peter Cayetano claimed in January 2026 that the project had lost out on budgetary opportunities. Nonetheless, the feasibility study has been finalized, enabling ADB to potentially offer more advantageous financing conditions and reduced geopolitical limitations.

==== Phase 2 ====
The second phase of the project, also known as the Northern Mindanao Railway, started its development in 2022 and was approved by the NEDA board in March 2023. At the same time, PPP Center granted the project's P100 million in funding for its feasibility study via the agency’s Project Development and Monitoring Facility, a revolving fund that supports infrastructure projects. It became one of the 194 flagship infrastructure projects under the Marcos administration's Build Better More program. The planned project and a feasibility study conducted by Deloitte Touche Tohmatsu India LLP are expected to be submitted in July 2024. The contract “will involve project preparation services for a preliminary assessment of the viability of the railway in Northern Mindanao,” the DOTr said in a statement. Among the aspects that will potentially be studied are the alignment of the railway, the number of stations, and the economic impact. It is a 54.8-kilometer railway line connecting Cagayan de Oro, connecting the municipalities of Laguindingan and Villanueva, Misamis Oriental. The Public-Private Partnership (PPP) Center is also backing the proposal.

Based on the project description, the railway project will include passenger railway stations, maintenance depots, operations control centers, connectivity to Languindingan Airport, connectivity to seaports, and transit-oriented developments (TOD). The railway will be designed to be capable of handling freight cargo at cargo terminals in the future. As per DEPDEV, the project is in the preparation phase, slated for implementation after 2028. Originally called Phase 3, the project has been rebranded to its current name as of 2025. A new study will be carried out, as it has been disclosed. The pre-feasibility study for Phase 3 was finalized in October.

In December of that year, Senator Loren Legarda criticized the project's omission from the 2026 budget.

== Construction ==
The Philippine government has delayed the construction of the project's first phase indefinitely, which was set to be undertaken by China. Prior to the withdrawal of the Chinese loan in 2023, the system was originally set to begin construction in the third quarter of 2021, with partial operations by 2022. The rest of the system will be opened between 2032 and 2037.

The start of construction was delayed in May 2022 as the DOTr did not receive the shortlist of the design-and-build contractors from the Chinese government.

== Route ==
Tagum–Davao–Digos section
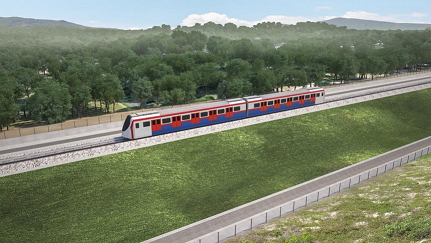
- A conceptual art showing an embankment section on the Mindanao Railway's Tagum–Davao–Digos section, showing a 2-car version of MTR's SP1900 EMU for reference.

Overview
- Owner: Philippine National Railways
- Area served: Davao City; Davao del Norte; Davao del Sur
- Locale: Davao Region
- Transit type: Commuter rail
- Number of lines: 1
- Number of stations: 8
- Daily ridership: 130,000 (projected)
- Website: www.pnr.gov.ph

Operation
- Operation will start: TBA
- Character: Grade-separated
- Rolling stock: Electric multiple units
- Train length: TBD
- Headway: 13 minutes

Technical
- System length: 100 km (62 mi)
- No. of tracks: Double
- Track gauge: 1,435 mm (4 ft 8 1/2 in) standard gauge
- Minimum radius of curvature: 850 m (2,790 ft)
- Average speed: 77–81 km/h (48–50 mph)
- Top speed: 120 km/h (75 mph)

The Mindanao Railway is planned to be constructed in ten phases, with a total of 2,278 kilometers (1,415 miles) of track to be built for the system. Phase 1 will be partially opened between Panabo and Carmen, Davao del Norte, by 2022, and full operations are expected by 2024.

=== Phase 1 ===
Also known as the Tagum–Davao–Digos (TDD) segment, this phase involves the construction of a 100 km (62 mi) segment between the cities of Tagum and Digos, (Note: Applies only to the Tagum–Digos segment or Phase 1.) passing through Davao City. It will have eight stations alongside two depots to be located in Tagum and Davao City, with the former being the segment's main yard. This is the only segment confirmed to have planned double-tracking and electrification upgrades in the future.

Station	Location
Tagum	Tagum City, Davao del Norte
Carmen	Carmen, Davao del Norte
Panabo	Panabo City, Davao del Norte
Mudiang	Mudiang, Bunawan, Davao City
Davao	Waan, Buhangin, Davao City
Toril	Toril, Davao City
Santa Cruz	Santa Cruz, Davao del Sur
Digos	Digos City, Davao del Sur

=== Other proposed phases ===
- Phase 2 (Original plan) – The second phase would have involve a 150 km (93 mi) segment south of Phase 1 between the cities of Digos and Koronadal, passing through General Santos.

Station	Location
Hagonoy	Hagonoy, Davao del Sur
Padada	Padada, Davao del Sur
Sulop	Sulop, Davao del Sur
Malalag	Malalag, Davao del Sur
Malungon	Malungon, Sarangani
Alabel	Alabel, Sarangani
General Santos	General Santos City
Polomolok	Polomolok, South Cotabato
Tupi	Tupi, South Cotabato
Tampakan	Tampakan, South Cotabato
Koronadal	Koronadal City, South Cotabato

Languindingan–Villanueva section (Northern Mindanao Railway)

Overview
- Owner: Philippine National Railways
- Area served: Metro Cagayan de Oro
- Locale: Northern Mindanao
- Transit type: Commuter rail/Freight rail
- Number of stations: 7

Operation
- Operation will start: TBA
- Character: Grade-separated
- Rolling stock: Electric multiple units

Technical
- System length: 54.8 km
- Track gauge: 1,435 mm (4 ft 8 1/2 in) standard gauge
- Minimum radius of curvature: 850 m (2,790 ft)
- Average speed: 77–81 km/h (48–50 mph)
- Top speed: 120 km/h (75 mph)

- Phase 2 (New plan) – The second phase is estimated to be 54.8 kilometers long and connect the metropolitan area of Cagayan de Oro from Laguindingan to Villanueva. It was identified in the 2021 Master Plan for the Sustainable Urban Infrastructure Development in Metropolitan Cagayan de Oro and will be an important transportation mode as Cagayan de Oro develops as the fourth metro area, according to the National Spatial Strategy.

Station	Location
Laguindingan	Laguindingan, Misamis Oriental
Alubijid	Alubijid, Misamis Oriental
El Salvador	El Salvador City, Misamis Oriental
Opol	Opol, Misamis Oriental
Cagayan de Oro	Cagayan de Oro
Tagoloan	Tagoloan, Misamis Oriental
Villanueva	Villanueva, Misamis Oriental

- Phase 3 – The third phase will involve a 214 km (133 mi) segment north of Phase 1 between the cities of Tagum and Butuan.

Station	Location
Mawab	Mawab, Davao de Oro
Nabunturan	Nabunturan, Davao de Oro
Montevista	Montevista, Davao de Oro
Monkayo	Monkayo, Davao de Oro
Trento	Trento, Agusan del Sur
Bunawan	Bunawan, Agusan del Sur
Rosario	Rosario, Agusan del Sur
San Francisco	San Francisco, Agusan del Sur
Prosperidad	Prosperidad, Agusan del Sur
Bayugan	Bayugan City, Agusan del Sur
Sibagat	Sibagat, Agusan del Sur
Butuan	Butuan

- Phase 4 – Phases 4 and 5 are the last two projects in sealing the new circumferential mainline of the Mindanao Railway, which replaced the Cagayan de Oro–Pagadian–Digos segment.
  - Koronadal–Cagayan de Oro mainline segment and Davao City–Bukidnon branch (undetermined total length) – The Davao City–Bukidnon branch will meet with the other end of the main line of the Koronadal–Cagayan de Oro segment at Talakag, Bukidnon, according to DOTr. This right-of-way is different to the earlier proposals that would have passed by the area of Valencia and Malaybalay.
  - Butuan–Cagayan de Oro segment (170 km) – A branch line will be also constructed north from Butuan to Surigao City.
- Phases 6–10 – These phases involve the construction of four radial lines, with one having an extension into the mainline network. Pagadian will be the main hub of four of these segments and lines. The following branch lines are involved:
  - Cagayan de Oro–Pagadian segment via Iligan (216 km)
  - Pagadian–Digos segment (242 km) – Digos is the southern terminus of Phase 1. This segment will also pass through Cotabato City and traverse the circumferential mainline via Kabacan.
  - Pagadian–Dipolog branch (122 km)
  - Pagadian–Zamboanga segment (222 km)
  - Butuan–Surigao branch (97 km)

The total length of the Koronadal–Cagayan de Oro and Davao City–Bukidnon segments, as well as future extensions on the line beyond Phase 10 such as the double-tracking of the Tagum–Digos segment, amounts to 645 kilometers (401 miles).

== Design ==
The Mindanao Railway will be initially constructed as a single-track line with future upgrades to dual tracking and rail electrification. The right-of-way acquired for the alignment is sufficient for a dual-track system, thus facilitating the upgrade. Timothy John Batan, Department of Transportation Undersecretary for Railways, said he wanted these upgrades to be implemented at once. Like all proposed intercity lines of the Philippine National Railways, it will be built in 1,435 mm (4 ft 8 1/2 in) standard gauge. This is part of the larger efforts by the agency to convert its network from narrow to standard gauge, the first in Southeast Asia to do so.

The maximum speed of trains on the line is 120 km/h (75 mph) and the average speed is 77–81 km/h (48–50 mph). Commuter trains will also have a headway of 13 minutes during partial operations for Phase 1. Lastly, the project suggests the use of the European Train Control System for its signalling and train control systems with at least Level 1 to be installed on the line.

A section of Phase 1 in Davao City shall also be connected to the Davao People Mover by a connecting bus service.

=== Electrification and double-tracking ===
The line will be initially constructed as a single-track line that will be by operated with diesel rolling stock, although upgrades to a standard electrified double-track mainline will be constructed in the future. The specific type of electrification system that will be adopted on the Mindanao Railway is yet to be determined. On the other hand, expansion of the single-track line to double-track has already been considered for at least the Tagum–Davao–Digos section, which is included in the total of 2,278 km (1,415 mi) track length of the entire system. For the current station arrangement however, passing sidings shall be used to allow trains to stop without obstructing traffic from the opposite direction, especially with the target headway being 13 minutes.

If the electrification and double-tracking plans were adopted, the current 120 km/h (75 mph) maximum speed for the diesel line would be raised to 160 km/h (99 mph), which is comparable to PNR's Luzon System's maximum speed and would count as higher-speed rail. The 2016 JICA study suggests the use of overhead catenaries on or before 2045.

==== High-speed rail ====
In 2018, the project was initially given the marketing title of "Trans-Mindanao High-Speed Railway". This was later simplified to "Mindanao Railway" after a maximum speed of 120 km/h (75 mph) was determined, which is less than half that of true high-speed rail. The name change also happened with the North–South Commuter Railway in Luzon and the Tel Aviv–Jerusalem railway in Israel, both of which were marketed as "high-speed" to distinguish themselves from the much slower existing train services there.

Despite the change in the project title, there are plans for a genuine high-speed rail network in the region, and the proposed infrastructure of the Mindanao Railway was planned with future high-speed rail development in mind along as with all the proposed railways for PNR. The two shortlisted Chinese proponents also stated interest in designing a high-speed line that will be capable of running speeds of up to 250 kilometers per hour (160 mph) once the present project achieves successful operations.

== Rolling stock ==
=== Under Chinese loan ===
In 2023, China backed out of providing loans to the Philippines for Mindanao Railway Project Phase 1. The system was supposed to accommodate both passenger and freight rolling stock, the latter due to its dual purpose to connect seaports around the island. Only the specifications for the commuter trains for the Tagum–Digos section was given as of December 2020. The design speed of the commuter trains is at 130 km/h (81 mph), although speed will be limited to 120 km/h (75 mph) for passenger trains and 80 km/h (50 mph) for freight trains. The diesel multiple units that will be used in the commuter service are arranged in married pairs, and will be combined in the future for arrangement of four- and eight-car unit trainsets.

An earlier order also cited the purchase of rolling stock for the intercity section. This order includes 33 DMU cars for the passenger service, which include six 5-car units and three spare cars for passenger trains, and 4 diesel-electric locomotives with 15 freight cars. The whereabouts of this order is yet to be determined.

Rolling stock	Commuter train	Intercity train	Freight train
Year	2022	c. 2024	
Manufacturer	TBD		
Units to be built	46	33 (Note: Includes 3 spare cars.)	4 locos, 15 freight cars
Cars per train	2	5	Does not apply
Length	21,500 mm (70.5 ft)	TBD	
Width	3,100 mm (10.2 ft)		
Train height	3,700 mm (12.1 ft) (Note: Includes air conditioning unit located on top of the trainset or locomotive.)		
Body material	Aluminium or stainless steel		TBD
Empty weight	TBD		
Capacity	250 per car (Note: 45 seated, 205 standing)	TBD	Freight only
Doors	TBD		
Traction power	Diesel-electric		
Top speed	120 km/h (75 mph)		80 km/h (50 mph)

=== Under revamped proposal for the first phase ===
In 2024, the government announced the proposed plan to change the system from a diesel-hauling to an electric one for the train sets. According to Transportation Secretary Bautista, he said that the diesel-powered trains were identified in the original study, but they will adopt a more modern and environment-friendly (eco-friendly) technology.

== See also ==
- PNR South Long Haul – another railway project that was supposed to be financed by China
- North–South Commuter Railway – a commuter rail under construction in Luzon
