= List of executive orders by Ramon Magsaysay =

Listed below are executive orders signed by Philippine President Ramon Magsaysay.

== 1953 ==
No.	Title	Date signed
1	Creating the Presidential Complaint and Action Commission under the Office of the President	December 30, 1953

== 1954 ==
No.	Title	Date signed
2	Changing "Malacañan Palace" to "Malacañang" and directing the omission of "Excellency" in addressing the president	January 4, 1954
3	Organizing a certain portion of the municipality of San Jose, province of Antique, into an independent municipality under the name of Hamtic	January 5, 1954
4	Abolishing the Integrity Board	January 5, 1954
5	Dissolving the Property Requisition Committee, Office of the President and transferring its functions to the different executive departments of the Government	January 7, 1954
6	Merging the municipality of Amaya, created by Executive Order Numbered Six Hundred Thirty-Nine issued on November 5, 1953, with the municipality of Tanza, province of Cavite	January 7, 1954
7	Creating the Peace and Amelioration Fund Commission	January 7, 1954
8	Prohibiting the slaughtering of carabaos for a period of one year	January 26, 1954
9	Promulgating rules and regulations for the control and supervision of the licensing, sale, possession, use, storage and manufacture of explosives	February 1, 1954
10	Creating a National Agricultural Council, provincial agricultural councils, city agricultural councils, and municipal agricultural councils	February 1, 1954
11	Creating the Liberty Wells Association	February 3, 1954
12	Creating a Council of State	February 11, 1954
13	Creating the municipality of Pagudpud in the province of Ilocos Norte	February 14, 1954
14	Merging the municipality of Victoria, created by Executive Order Numbered Six Hundred and Twenty-Eight issued on October 14, 1953, with the municipality of Allen, province of Samar	February 14, 1954
15	Implementing Republic Act No. 657, otherwise known as the Cassava Flour Law, in the interest of the national economy	February 15, 1954
16	Merging the territories of the new municipalities of Villanueva and Libertad with their respective mother municipalities of Jasaan, Tagoloan, Initao and Alubijid, Oriental Misamis	March 9, 1954
17	Fixing office hours during the hot season	March 17, 1954
18	Terminating the collection of tolls at the Tinori-an and Quianan (Tiolas) Toll Bridges, province of Iloilo	March 17, 1954
19	Creating the Presidential Complaints and Action Committee under the Office of the President	March 17, 1954
20	Transferring the seat of government of the municipality of Santo Tomas, province of Pampanga, from barrio San Matias to the old poblacion of Santo Tomas	March 23, 1954
21	Amending Paragraph Five of Executive Order No. 111, dated August 30, 1937, entitled "Prohibiting and restricting the practice of nepotism"	March 23, 1954
22	Prohibiting the use of trawls in San Miguel Bay	April 5, 1954
23	Providing an award of one hundred thousand pesos (₱100,000.00) for the best method of eradicating rats by means of microorganism - virus, bacterium, bacillus or fungus - not dangerous to human beings, animals and plants	April 7, 1954
24	Creating the Consultative Council of Students	April 8, 1954
25	Amending Paragraph 3, Part II of Executive Order No. 321 dated June 12, 1950, entitled "Prescribing the code of the National Flag and the National Anthem of the Republic of the Philippines"	April 10, 1954
26	Amending further the First Paragraph of Executive Order No. 79, dated December 17, 1945, entitled "Creating a Quezon Memorial Committee to take charge of the nation-wide campaign to raise funds for the erection of a national monument in honor of the late president Manuel L. Quezon"	April 19, 1954
27	Prohibiting the use of public funds for the entertainment of visiting officials and the collection of contributions from Government officials and employees for the same purpose	April 19, 1954
28	Amending Executive Order No. 651, dated December 15, 1953, creating the Roxas Memorial Commission	April 23, 1954
29	Directing that no officer or employee of Government corporations be allowed per diems of more than ₱50.00 when traveling abroad	May 3, 1954
30	Designating the district health officers, city health officers and sanitary engineers of the Department of Health to regulate the planning and construction of water supplies	May 3, 1954
31	Regulations governing the use of motor vehicles or other means of transportation for official purposes	May 3, 1954
32	Further amending Executive Order No. 651, dated December 15, 1953, creating the Roxas Memorial Commission	May 20, 1954
33	Revising further Executive Order No. 72, dated December 3, 1936, establishing a classification of ports	May 20, 1954
34	Declaring that portion of the Benguet Road (Kennon Road) from Klondyke's Spring to Camp Six within the Mountain Province as toll road and fixing schedule of fees for the collection of tolls thereon	May 20, 1954
35	Providing for an effective organization for national security and for the coordination and unified direction of national mobilization plans and policies	May 20, 1954
36	Creating a special committee to administer the rural reconstruction project at San Luis, Pampanga	May 22, 1954
37	Amending Executive Order No. 500, dated May 2, 1952, relative to the transfer of unserviceable Government property to the National Shipyards and Steel Corporation	May 22, 1954
38	Merging the municipal district of Lumbia in the province of Misamis Oriental with the municipality of Opol, same province, and the city of Cagayan de Oro	May 26, 1954
39	Adjusting the initial classifications of the newly created municipalities of Manukan, province of Zamboanga del Norte, and Dinas and Malangas, both of the province of Zamboanga del Sur	May 28, 1954
40	Creating a committee to implement the execution of the Fisheries Act for purposes of suppressing dynamite fishing	June 14, 1954
40-A	Instituting the Golden Heart Presidential Award	June 21, 1954
41	Creating a committee to coordinate and deliver essential services of the Government and civic organizations to farm families in new-development agricultural areas	June 25, 1954
42	Creating a committee to screen and aid deserving squatters and new settlers in Davao province	June 25, 1954
43	Creating an Expropriation Committee in the Office of the President to study requests for expropriation of landed estates and home sites	July 6, 1954
44	Incorporating the municipal port of Lazareto in the municipality of Calapan with the national port of Calapan, Oriental Mindoro	July 6, 1954
45	Terminating the collection of tolls at the Guimbal Bridge, province of Iloilo	July 10, 1954
46	Exempting the National Rice and Corn Corporation from the payment of seventeen per centum (17%) excise tax on foreign exchange for the importation of rice	July 10, 1954
47	Creating the Investment Assistance Commission	July 13, 1954
48	Delegating to the Undersecretary of Agriculture and Natural Resources the power to sign patents and certificates	July 21, 1954
49	Conferring the temporary rank of Lieutenant General upon the Chief of Staff of the Armed Forces of the Philippines	July 23, 1954
50	Terminating the collection of tolls at the Hibagnan Toll Bridge, province of Leyte	August 10, 1954
51	Amending Executive Order Numbered Four Hundred Seventy-Five and for other purposes	August 10, 1954
52	Creating the Jose Rizal National Centennial Commission	August 10, 1954
53	Amending further the First Paragraph of Executive Order No. 79, dated December 17, 1945, entitled "Creating a Quezon Memorial Committee to take charge of the nation-wide campaign to raise funds for the erection of a national monument in honor of the late president Manuel L. Quezon"	August 10, 1954
54	Ordering the furnishing of complete service records of all personnel of the Republic of the Philippines to the Government Service Insurance System	August 10, 1954
55	Amending Section 2 of Executive Order No. 111, dated August 30, 1937, entitled "Prohibiting and restricting the practice of nepotism"	August 11, 1954
56	Transferring the seat of government of the municipality of Lala, province of Lanao, from its present location to the barrio of Lanipao of the same municipality	August 13, 1954
57	Creating the Community Development Planning Council and defining its functions and activities	August 16, 1954
58	Declaring Corregidor and Bataan National Shrines, opening them to the public and making them accessible as tourist attractions and scenes of popular pilgrimages, and creating a commission for their development and maintenance	August 16, 1954
59	Providing for facilities necessary to declare effectivity of Republic Act No. 832 in all provinces and chartered cities of the Philippines according to a definite schedule of dates	August 24, 1954
60	Designating the Board of Liquidators created under Executive Order No. 372, dated November 24, 1950, to liquidate the assets and liabilities of the Land Settlement and Development Corporation (LASEDECO), abolished under Republic Act No. 1160	August 31, 1954
61	Amending Annex "A" to Executive Order No. 453 dated June 19, 1951, entitled "Establishing rules and regulations to control, curtail, regulate and/or prohibit the exportation or re-exportation of certain items from the Philippines, to implement Republic Act No. 613"	August 31, 1954
62	Further amending Section 5-c of Executive Order No. 601 dated June 26, 1953, entitled "Prescribing rules and regulations for the appointment of reserve officers into the Regular Force, Armed Forces of the Philippines", as amended by Executive Order No. 644, dated November 21, 1953	September 6, 1954
63	Organizing a certain portion of the municipality of Kidapawan, province of Cotabato, into an independent municipality under the name of Makilala	September 8, 1954
64	Terminating the collection of tolls at the Daet Toll Bridge, province of Camarines Norte	September 11, 1954
65	Creating the municipality of Monkayo in the province of Davao	September 14, 1954
66	Amending Executive Order No. 22, dated April 5, 1954, entitled "Prohibiting the use of trawls in San Miguel Bay"	September 23, 1954
67	Promulgating rules and regulations covering detail or assignment of military personnel to civilian offices and officials	September 23, 1954
68	Amending the proviso of the First Paragraph of Executive Order Numbered Thirty-Four, dated May 20, 1954, declaring that portion of the Benguet Road (Kennon Road) from Klondyke's Spring to Camp Six within the Mountain Province as toll road and fixing schedule of fees for the collection of tolls thereon	September 23, 1954
69	Transferring the seat of government of the municipality of Oteiza, province of Surigao, from its present site to the barrio of Marihatag, same municipality	September 23, 1954
70	Creating an Asian Good Neighbor Relations Commission to promote more intimate understanding of the aims and aspirations of the Filipino people, better appreciation of their culture and progress as a Christian and democratic nation, and closer relations with their Asian neighbors	September 27, 1954
71	Merging the barrio of Limba, municipality of La Paz, province of Leyte with the poblacion of said municipality	September 27, 1954
72	Terminating the collection of tolls at the Digdig Toll Bridge, province of Nueva Ecija	September 27, 1954
73	Creating a special committee to determine present and future real estate requirements for the national defense program	September 30, 1954
74	Terminating the collection of tolls at the Mandulog Toll Bridge, city of Iligan	October 13, 1954
75	Terminating the collection of tolls at the Libungan Toll Bridge, province of Cotabato	October 13, 1954
76	Terminating the collection of tolls at the Cagayan Toll Bridge, Cagayan de Oro city	October 15, 1954
77	Transferring the remains of war dead interred at Bataan Memorial Cemetery, Bataan province and at other places in the Philippines to the Republic Memorial Cemetery at Fort Wm. McKinley, Rizal province	October 23, 1954
78	Further amending Executive Order No. 24, dated November 12, 1946, entitled "Creating the National Advisory Health Council"	October 25, 1954
79	Creating a National Forestry Council	November 2, 1954
80	Further amending Executive Order No. 22, dated April 5, 1954, as amended by Executive Order No. 66, dated September 23, 1954	November 2, 1954
81	Further amending Executive Order No. 475, dated October 5, 1951, as amended by Executive Order No. 51, dated August 10, 1954	November 20, 1954
82	Prescribing the collection of uniform fees in connection with the issuance of permits to engage in retail business under the provisions of Republic Act No. 1180	November 29, 1954
83	Amending Executive Order No. 23 dated April 7, 1954, entitled "Providing an award of one hundred thousand pesos (₱100,000.00) for the best method of eradicating rats by means of microorganism - virus, bacterium, bacillus or fungus - not dangerous to human beings, animals and plants"	December 4, 1954
84	Creating the municipality of Saint Bernard in the province of Leyte.	December 9, 1954
85	Establishing the Manila Port Area Rat-Proof Building Zone	December 15, 1954
86	Creating the municipality of Botocan in the province of Laguna	December 15, 1954

== 1955 ==
No.	Title	Date signed
87	Amending Executive Order No. 58 dated August 16, 1954, "Declaring Corregidor and Bataan National Shrines, opening them to the public and making them accessible as tourist attractions and scenes of popular pilgrimages, and creating a commission for their development and maintenance"	January 5, 1955
88	Prohibiting the slaughtering of carabaos for a period of one year	January 6, 1955
89	Amending Executive Order No. 70 and Administrative Order No. 64, both dated September 27, 1954, creating and organizing the Asian Good Neighbor Relations Commission	January 7, 1955
90	Prohibiting the use of trawls in Sorsogon Bay	January 12, 1955
91	Amending Executive Order No. 324, dated February 11, 1941, entitled "Prescribing regulations governing the approval of applications for vacation and sick leave of officers and employees of the Government"	January 12, 1955
92	Amending Executive Order No. 11, dated February 3, 1954, creating the Liberty Wells Association	January 17, 1955
93	Revoking Executive Order Numbered Eighty-Six creating the municipality of Botocan in the province of Laguna	January 19, 1955
94	Further amending Executive Order No. 58, dated August 16, 1954, so as to include the director of planning of the National Planning Commission as member of the commission for the development and maintenance of Corregidor and Bataan	February 7, 1955
95	Amending Executive Order No. 45 dated July 6, 1936, entitled "Creating a National Transformation Board to advise the Government on the improvement of land, marine, and air transportation facilities"	February 7, 1955
96	Merging the municipal district of Lourdez in the province of Misamis Oriental with the municipalities of Alubijid, El Salvador, Initao, Manticao and Opol, same province	February 7, 1955
97	Organizing the sitio of Sibacungan of the poblacion, municipality of Lambunao, Iloilo, into a separate and independent barrio	February 12, 1955
98	Annexing a portion of the territory of the municipality of Catigbian, province of Bohol, to the municipality of Tubigon, same province	February 17, 1955
99	Terminating the collection of tolls at the Mabolo Toll Bridge, Naga city	February 26, 1955
100	Creating a committee to study and find ways and means of promoting farm mechanization and improving credit facilities to farmers	February 26, 1955
101	Waiving the additional progressive taxes to be collected from, and paid by, proprietors and operators of certain sugar mills for the 1953–1954 crop	March 3, 1955
102	Amending Executive Order No. 79 dated November 2, 1954, by designating the Undersecretary of Education as an additional member of the National Forestry Council and authorizing the Director of Forestry to organize city and municipal forestry councils	March 5, 1955
103	Further amending Paragraph 18 of Executive Order No. 303 dated September 26, 1940, as amended by Executive Order No. 646 dated December 7, 1953	March 5, 1955
104	Terminating the collection of tolls at the Embarcadero Toll Bridge, Alaminos, Pangasinan	March 9, 1955
105	Designating the Commissioner of Public Highways as an additional member of the National Traffic Commission created in Executive Order No. 536 dated October 21, 1952, as amended by Executive Order No. 569 dated February 17, 1953	March 10, 1955
106	Creating a committee on facilitation of international air transport in the Philippines	March 12, 1955
107	Creating a Presidential Committee on Trade Agreements and related matters covered by Republic Act 1189	March 15, 1955
108	Further amending Executive Order No. 70, and Administrative Order No. 64, both dated September 27, 1954, as amended by Executive Order No. 89, dated January 7, 1955, creating and organizing the Asian Good Neighbor Relations Commission	March 23, 1955
109	Fixing office hours during the hot season	March 30, 1955
110	Reclassifying all municipalities in the Philippines	April 14, 1955
111	Terminating the collection of tolls at the Ganano Toll Bridge, province of Isabela	April 16, 1955
112	Authorizing the Commissioner of Immigration to issue through the Secretary of Justice readmission certificates to refugees who take advantage of the Refugee Relief Act of 1953 of the United States	April 21, 1955
113	Establishing the classification of roads	May 2, 1955
114	Further amending Paragraph Five of Executive Order No. 111 dated August 30, 1937, entitled "Prohibiting and restricting the practice of nepotism"	May 13, 1955
115	Reorganizing the Council of National Defense	May 27, 1955
116	Creating a committee to screen and aid deserving squatters and new settlers in Basilan city	June 11, 1955
117	Organizing the sitio of Biasong of barrio Lanao in the municipality of Pilar, province of Cebu, into an independent barrio under the same name	June 11, 1955
118	Creating a committee to screen and aid deserving squatters and new settlers in Oriental Mindoro	June 22, 1955
119	Providing for the implementing details for Reorganization Plan No. 10, on economic planning	July 1, 1955
120	Giving the Secretary of National Defense full authority to administer all matters relating to the construction and equipping of hospitals for veterans and the provision of medical care and treatment for veterans, and to appoint consultants in the Veterans Memorial Hospital	July 18, 1955
121	Amending Executive Order No. 11 dated February 3, 1954, as amended, creating the Liberty Wells Association	July 18, 1955
122	Defining the territorial limits of the city of Trece Martires	July 18, 1955
123	Creating the Tagaytay Development Commission	July 29, 1955
124	Segregating the barrio of Bicos from the municipality of Rizal, province of Nueva Ecija, and annexing the same to the municipality of Llanera, same province	August 25, 1955
125	Amending Executive Order No. 124, dated August 25, 1955	September 6, 1955
126	Creating the municipality of Claver in the province of Surigao	September 13, 1955
127	Transferring to the National Waterworks and Sewerage Authority all the records, properties, machinery, equipment, appropriations, assets, choses in action, contracts, liabilities, obligations, mortgage bonds, and all indebtedness of the former Metropolitan Water District, the Waterworks Section and the Wells and Drills Section of the Bureau of Public Works, the National Market and Waterworks Board of the Department of Public Works and Communications (insofar as they pertain to its waterworks functions), and all other waterwork projects under the ICA-PHILCUSA and the Government-owned waterworks and sewerage systems in the provinces, cities, municipalities, and municipal districts	September 19, 1955
128	Requiring all Government entities, bureaus, agencies, and instrumentalities producing palay and corn to sell their surplus production to the National Rice and Corn Corporation	September 23, 1955
129	Designating the Agricultural Credit and Cooperative Financing Administration (ACCFA) as the Government agency to handle the purchase and exportation of ramie fiber and the importation of ramie goods processed from 100 per cent Philippine ramie fiber	September 23, 1955
130	Creating a committee to screen and aid deserving squatters and new settlers in Mindoro Occidental	September 23, 1955
131	Revising the schedule of per diems for provincial, city, and municipal officers and employees and revoking Executive Order No. 369, dated September 15, 1941	September 23, 1955
132	Declaring the area comprising the living and operational quarters and areas assigned to the Japanese salvage teams off limits to civilians and unauthorized persons	September 23, 1955
133	Fixing the boundary line between the municipalities of Padada and Hagonoy, both of the province of Davao	September 23, 1955
134	Amending Section 38 of Executive Order No. 119 dated July 1, 1955, entitled "Providing for the implementing details for Reorganization Plan No. 10, on economic planning"	September 24, 1955
135	Further amending Paragraph Five of Executive Order No. 111 dated August 30, 1937, entitled "Prohibiting and restricting the practice of nepotism"	October 10, 1955
136	Prescribing rules and regulations for the appointment in the Regular Force, Philippine Air Force, of reserve officer pilots who are graduates of the Philippine Air Force or United States Air Force flying schools	October 10, 1955
137	Adjusting the classification of the municipality of Madrid, province of Surigao, from fourth class to third class, thereby amending Executive Order Numbered One Hundred Ten, dated April 14, 1955, reclassifying all municipalities in the Philippines	October 17, 1955
138	Terminating the collection of tolls at the Sigma Toll Bridge, province of Capiz	October 22, 1955
139	Further amending Section 38 of Executive Order No. 119, dated July 1, 1955, entitled "Providing for the implementing details for Reorganization Plan No. 10, on economic planning" as amended by Executive Order No. 134, dated September 24, 1955	October 25, 1955
140	Defining the administrative organization of the Land Tenure Administration and providing for its cooperation and coordination with the other land reform agencies	December 6, 1955
141	Creating a Science Advisory Committee	December 8, 1955
142	Annexing a certain portion of the territory of the municipality of Dinaig, province of Cotabato, to the newly created municipality of Upi in the same province	December 16, 1955
143	Amending Executive Order No. 36, dated May 22, 1954, entitled "Creating a special committee to administer the rural reconstruction project at San Luis, Pampanga"	December 19, 1955
144	Authorizing the designation of personnel officers in the departments, bureaus, offices, and agencies of the National Government and defining the duties of such officers	December 19, 1955
145	Waiving the additional progressive taxes to be collected from, and paid by, proprietors and operators of certain sugar mills for the crop years 1953-1954 and 1954–1955	December 21, 1955
146	Amending Executive Order No. 298 dated August 12, 1940, entitled "Prescribing the automatic renewal of contracts, requiring public bidding before entering into new contracts, and providing exceptions therefore," by inserting the following as the Fourth Paragraph thereof	December 27, 1955
147	Revoking Executive Order No. 124 dated August 25, 1955, as amended by Executive Order No. 125 dated September 6, 1955, segregating the barrio of Bicos from the municipality of Rizal, province of Nueva Ecija, and annexing the same to the municipality of Llanera, same province	December 28, 1955
148	Creating a National Housing Council to advise the president of the Philippines on housing matters	December 28, 1955
149	Terminating the collection of tolls at the Bancag Toll Bridge, province of Abra	December 28, 1955
150	Modifying the rates of import duty provided under the Philippine Tariff Act of 1909, as amended	December 31, 1955
151	Readjusting the classification of the province of Zambales from second class to first class	December 31, 1955
152	Creating the barrios of Mabinit and Bagacay in the municipality of Legaspi, province of Albay	December 31, 1955
153	Amending Executive Order No. 7 dated January 7, 1954, entitled "Creating the Peace and Amelioration Fund Commission"	December 31, 1955

== 1956 ==
No.	Title	Date signed
154	Segregating the sitio of Delabayan from the municipality of Kolambugan and annexing the same to the municipality of Kauswagan, both in the province of Lanao	January 4, 1956
155	Conferring Cabinet rank upon the Press Secretary to the President	January 6, 1956
156	Abolishing the Community Development Planning Council, transferring its administrative staff, records, funds, equipment, and supplies to the Office of the President and placing the same under the supervision and control of a Presidential Assistant on Community Development	January 6, 1956
157	Creating a committee to choose a parcel of vacant land of the Government in the city of Manila as a suitable site for a National Theater and to prepare an appropriate architectural design or plan therefor	January 13, 1956
158	Revoking Executive Order No. 634, issued on October 26, 1953, creating the municipality of Victoria in the province of Bohol	January 16, 1956
159	Terminating the collection of tolls at the Daguitan Toll Bridge, province of Leyte	January 17, 1956
160	Recreating the municipal district of Kasibu in the province of Nueva Vizcaya	January 19, 1956
161	Changing the boundary line between the municipalities of Hamtic and San Jose, both of the province of Antique	January 25, 1956
162	Prohibiting the slaughtering of carabaos for a period of one year	January 30, 1956
163	Creating provincial, city, municipal, and barrio committees to lead the celebration of the Rizal centenary in their respective communities	January 30, 1956
164	Condoning the taxes on all real properties located in the municipal district of Luuk, province of Sulu	February 11, 1956
165	Creating the National Fire Control Council	February 27, 1956
166	Amending Executive Order No. 116 dated September 1, 1937, by providing additional exceptions thereto	February 29, 1956
167	Terminating the collection of tolls at the Calumpang River Bridge, province of Batangas	March 15, 1956
168	Terminating the collection of tolls at the Jalud Toll Bridge, province of Iloilo	March 17, 1956
169	Organizing the sitio of Daha-Diot in the municipality of San Isidro, province of Leyte, into a regular barrio	March 24, 1956
170	Fixing office hours during the hot season	March 28, 1956
171	Annexing certain barrios of the municipality of Pontevedra to the municipality of Ma-ayon, both in the province of Capiz	March 28, 1956
172	Creating the barrio of Maymatan in the municipality of Goa, province of Camarines Sur	March 28, 1956
173	Creating certain barrios in the municipality of Naujan, province of Mindoro Oriental	March 28, 1956
174	Merging the barrio of Nasuli-a of the municipality of Anini-y with the municipality of Dao, both in the province of Antique	April 3, 1956
175	Amending Executive Order No. 73, dated September 30, 1954	April 4, 1956
176	Fixing the boundary line between the municipalities of Milagros and Cawayan, both of the province of Masbate	April 27, 1956
177	Terminating the collection of tolls at the Lajab Toll Bridge, province of Capiz	April 27, 1956
178	Creating the barrios of San Isidro and Union in the municipality of Ubay, Bohol	May 7, 1956
179	Reclassifying the province of Catanduanes	May 8, 1956
180	Prescribing rules and regulations governing the acquisition of titles to farm lots within the Mount Data National Park Reservation and Central Cordillera Forest Reserve, both in the Mountain Province, directing the eviction of the alien farmers within these two reservations and prosecution of Filipino dummies together with their alien exploiters for violation of the public land, anti-dummy, and internal revenue laws	May 10, 1956
181	Readjusting the classification of the province of Sulu from first class to first class-A	May 15, 1956
182	Amending Executive Order No. 116 dated June 11, 1955, entitled "Creating a committee to screen and aid deserving squatters and new settlers in Basilan city"	May 25, 1956
183	Creating certain barrios in the municipality of Bilar, province of Bohol	June 11, 1956
184	Creating the municipality of Dagohoy in the province of Bohol	June 21, 1956
185	Annexing to the municipality of San Miguel, province of Leyte, certain barrios of the municipality of Barugo, same province	June 22, 1956
186	Exempting the city of Manila from Executive Order No. 500 dated May 2, 1952, entitled "Directing that all unserviceable property from which scrap metal can be derived and no longer needed by the Government, its branches, agencies, and instrumentalities, be transferred, without cost, to the National Shipyards and Steel Corporation," as amended by Executive Order No. 37 dated May 22, 1954	June 24, 1956
187	Transferring the seat of government of the municipality of Liloy, province of Zamboanga del Norte, from the barrio of Liloy to the barrio of Timan in the same municipality	June 26, 1956
188	Reclassifying the province of the Philippines	July 9, 1956
189	Annexing to the municipality of Padre Garcia, province of Batangas, a certain portion of the territory of the municipality of Rosario, same province	July 9, 1956
190	Merging the municipal district of Tambo in the province of Negros Oriental with the municipality of Ayungon, same province	July 18, 1956
191	Terminating the collection of tolls at the Bucao Toll Bridge, province of Zambales	July 18, 1956
192	Reducing the present rate of tariff duty on cement	July 19, 1956
193	Designating the President of the Sanitary Inspectors Association of the Philippines as a member of the National Advisory Health Council	July 20, 1956
194	Extending the prohibition to slaughter carabaos up to December 31, 1956	July 23, 1956
195	Creating the municipality of Malimono in the province of Surigao	July 31, 1956
196	Annexing to the municipality of Borja, province of Bohol, certain barrios of the municipality of Carmen, same province	August 1, 1956
197	Terminating the collection of tolls at the Lasang Toll Bridge, province of Davao	August 1, 1956
198	Creating the barrio of Linao in the municipality of Badajoz, province of Romblon	August 1, 1956
199	Annexing a certain portion of the so-called barrio of Jones, municipality of Tanjay, Negros Oriental, to the municipality of Pamplona, same province	August 15, 1956
200	Amending Executive Order No. 192 dated July 19, 1956, entitled "Reducing the present rate of tariff duty on cement"	August 24, 1956
201	Abolishing the President's San Luis Project Committee	September 3, 1956
202	Organizing certain sitios within the municipality of Aloran, Misamis Occidental, into municipal district under the name of Concepcion	September 27, 1956
203	Creating an Air Navigation Services Coordinating Committee (ANSCC) in the Philippines	October 9, 1956
204	Renaming the Corregidor-Bataan National Shrines Commission created under Executive Order No. 58 dated August 16, 1954, as the National Shrines Commission, modifying the membership thereof, and giving it additional functions	October 9, 1956
205	Revoking Executive Order No. 196, issued on August 1, 1956, annexing to the municipality of Borja, province of Bohol, certain barrios of the municipality of Carmen, same province	October 12, 1956
206	Creating a joint committee for Philippine participation in the Brussels International Exposition of 1958	October 13, 1956
207	Annexing to the municipality of San Jose, province of Negros Oriental, certain sitios of the barrio of Siapo, municipality of Amlan, same province	October 15, 1956
208	Creating an Interim Reparations Committee	October 17, 1956
209	Providing for the implementing details for Reorganization Plan No. 60 relative to public utilities regulation and land transportation	October 19, 1956
210	Creating the barrio of Cawayan in the municipality of Badajoz, province of Romblon	October 29, 1956
211	Allowing reserve officers of the Armed Forces of the Philippines to possess firearms under special permit, etc.	November 5, 1956
212	Amending the Fourth Paragraph of Executive Order No. 298 dated August 12, 1940, entitled "Prescribing the automatic renewal of contracts, requiring public bidding before entering into new contracts, and providing exceptions therefor," as inserted by Executive Order No. 146 dated December 27, 1955	November 6, 1956
213	Requiring all departments, bureaus, offices, agencies, instrumentalities and political subdivisions of the Government, including the corporations owned or controlled by the Government, the Armed Forces, Government hospitals and public educational institutions to buy from the National Rice and Corn Corporation and the Central Cooperative Exchange, Inc., whenever available, all their requirements for rice	November 12, 1956
214	Creating the municipality of Carmen in the province of Cotabato	November 15, 1956
215	Amending Executive Order No. 524 dated August 12, 1952, entitled "Requiring all departments, bureaus, offices, agencies, instrumentalities and political subdivisions of the Government, including the corporations owned or controlled by the Government, the Armed Forces, Government hospitals, and public educational institutions to buy from the Textile Mills of the National Development Company, whenever available, all their requirements for clothing materials"	November 17, 1956
216	Providing for the implementing details for Reorganization Plan No. 30-A relative to agriculture and natural resources	November 17, 1956
217		December 3, 1956
218	Providing for the implementing details for Reorganization Plan No. 20-A relative to labor	December 10, 1956
219	Waiving the additional progressive taxes to be collected from, and paid by, proprietors and operators of certain sugar mills for the crop year 1955–1956	December 13, 1956
220	Providing that the various administrative actions required by Executive Order No. 209 dated October 19, 1956, and Reorganization Plan No. 60 relative to public utilities regulation and land transportation shall be taken within seventy days from October 19, 1956	December 18, 1956
221	Prescribing the base pay of the Chief of Staff and the Vice-Chief of Staff of the Armed Forces of the Philippines	December 19, 1956
222	Creating the municipality of Liargao in the province of Zamboanga del Sur	December 28, 1956
223	Creating the municipality of Siay in the province of Zamboanga del Sur	December 28, 1956
224	Providing that the various administrative actions required by Executive Order No. 209 dated October 19, 1956, and Reorganization Plan No. 60 relative to public utilities regulation and land transportation shall be taken on or before January 15, 1957	December 28, 1956

== 1957 ==
No.	Title	Date signed
225	Terminating the collection of tolls on the toll bridges listed hereunder	January 2, 1957
226	Creating a national campaign committee to raise funds to carry out the objectives of Jose Rizal National Centennial Commission	January 2, 1957
227	Providing for the implementing details for Reorganization Plans Nos. 15-A and 27-A relative to commerce and industry	January 5, 1957
228	Extending the prohibition to slaughter carabaos up to June 30, 1957	January 7, 1957
229	Terminating the collection of tolls at the Indiana Toll Bridge, province of Nueva Vizcaya	January 14, 1957
230	Terminating the collection of tolls at the Plaridel Toll Bridge, province of Pangasinan	January 14, 1957
231	Providing that the various administrative actions required by Executive Order No. 209 dated October 19, 1956, and Reorganization Plan No. 60 relative to public utilities regulation and land transportation shall be taken on or before January 25, 1957	January 15, 1957
232	Providing that the various administrative actions required by Executive Order No. 209 dated October 19, 1956, and Reorganization Plan No. 60 relative to public utilities regulation and land transportation shall be taken on or before February 28, 1957	January 25, 1957
233	Returning the seat of government of the municipality of Nueva Valencia, province of Iloilo, from its present site at the barrio of Igang to its former site at the barrio of Santa Ana, same municipality	January 31, 1957
234	Declaring the municipal properties under Tax Declaration No. 9984 in the name of the municipality of Batan, province of Aklan, as a national shrine	February 11, 1957
235	Classifying municipal districts in the Philippines	February 13, 1957
236	Prescribing procedures for the planning of development finances, the issuance of Government securities, and the disbursement of proceeds	February 13, 1957
237	Prescribing rules and regulations governing the seniority, appointment, promotion, elimination, and utilization in time of emergency, of officers of the Corps of Professors, Philippine Military Academy	February 13, 1957
238	Creating the municipality of Monreal in the province of Masbate	February 13, 1957
239	Creating the municipality of Liargao in the province of Zamboanga del Sur	February 13, 1957
240	Abolishing the municipality of Pagudpud in the province of Ilocos Norte, and restoring the different barrios composing this municipality to the municipality of Bangui, same province, to which they belonged prior to their becoming parts of Paguidpud	February 16, 1957
241	Providing the implementation of Executive Order No. 209 dated October 19, 1956, and Reorganization Plan No. 60, relative to public utilities regulations and land transportation until the appointment and qualification of the Commissioners composing the Public Utilities Commission	February 28, 1957
242	Postponing the implementation of Executive Order No. 227 dated January 5, 1957, and Reorganization Plans Nos. 15-A and 27-A which relates to commerce and industry until the appointment and qualification of the Directors of Domestic Trade, Foreign Trade, Industrial Promotion and Cooperatives Administration	March 1, 1957
243	Condoning the taxes on all real properties located in the province of Cotabato	March 6, 1957
