= Sanjia Steel =

Coordinates: 8°33′03.7″N 124°44′42.5″E

Philippine Sanjia-Steel Corp.
- Type: Private
- Industry: Steel
- Founded: October 17, 2018; 7 years ago in Cagayan de Oro
- Headquarters: Tagoloan, Misamis Oriental, Philippines
- Number of locations: 1 steel mill (2026)
- Products: Reinforcing steel bar
- Production output: 600 thousand metric tons per year (2026)

Philippine Sanjia-Steel Corporation is a Philippine steel company which runs a steel plant in Tagoloan, Misamis Oriental.

== History ==
The Philippine Sanjia Steel Corporation was established on October 17, 2018, in Cagayan de Oro. The Chinese-backed company was able to lease a 22.6 hectares (56 acres) within the Phividec Industrial Estate in Tagoloan, Misamis Oriental.

The groundbreaking for the Tagoloan steel plant was held on March 15, 2019. The steel plant became fully operational by 2021.

The Philippine Iron and Steel Institute in 2024 found steel allegedly from Sanjia Steel to be substandard. The company denied the claim raising the possibility that the tested products are counterfeit and do not belong to Sanjia Steel.

In May 2026, law enforcement agencies raided the Tagoloan steel plant and detained 69 Chinese workers who are allegedly undocumented and concerns over substandard steel which was allegedly detected to be contaminated with radiation. The company disputed the claims characterizing the raid "harassment" stating the workers have proper documentation and plans to invite independent international auditors to check its compliance.

== Plant ==
The Sanjia Steel steel plant in Tagoloan, Misamis Oriental within the Phividec Industrial Estate has an annual steel production capacity of 600,000 MT. As of 2026, the plant employed 300 people.
