= Misamis Oriental's 2nd congressional district =

Legislative district of the Philippines

- Constituency for the House of Representatives of the Philippines
- Location of Misamis Oriental within the Philippines
- Province: Misamis Oriental
- Region: Northern Mindanao
- Population: 512,238 (2015)
- Electorate: 349,580 (2019)
- Major settlements: 14 LGUs: Cities; El Salvador; Municipalities; Alubijid; Claveria; Gitagum; Initao; Jasaan; Laguindingan; Libertad; Lugait; Manticao; Naawan; Opol; Tagoloan; Villanueva
- Area: 1,650.35 km^{2} (637.20 sq mi)

Current constituency
- Created: 1987
- Representative: Yevgeny Vincente B. Emano
- Political party: Nacionalista; PADAYN
- Congressional bloc: Majority

Misamis Oriental's 2nd congressional district is one of the two congressional districts of the Philippines in the province of Misamis Oriental. It has been represented in the House of Representatives since 1987. The district encompasses the western half of the province consisting of the city of El Salvador and the municipalities of Alubijid, Claveria, Gitagum, Initao, Jasaan, Laguindingan, Libertad, Lugait, Manticao, Naawan, Opol, Tagoloan and Villanueva. It is currently represented in the 20th Congress by Yevgeny Vincente B. Emano of the Nacionalista Party and Padayon Pilipino.

== Representation history ==
#	Image	Member	Term of office		Congress	Party	Electoral history	Constituent LGUs
#	Image	Member	Start	End	Congress	Party	Electoral history	Constituent LGUs
=== Misamis Oriental's 2nd district for the House of Representatives of the Philippines ===
District created February 2, 1987 from Misamis Oriental's at-large district.
1		Victorico Chaves	June 30, 1987	June 30, 1998	8th	PDP–Laban	Elected in 1987.	1987–present Alubijid, Claveria, El Salvador, Gitagum, Initao, Jasaan, Laguindingan, Libertad, Lugait, Manticao, Naawan, Opol, Tagoloan, Villanueva
1		Victorico Chaves	June 30, 1987	June 30, 1998	9th	LDP	Re-elected in 1992.	1987–present Alubijid, Claveria, El Salvador, Gitagum, Initao, Jasaan, Laguindingan, Libertad, Lugait, Manticao, Naawan, Opol, Tagoloan, Villanueva
1		Victorico Chaves	June 30, 1987	June 30, 1998	10th	Lakas	Re-elected in 1995.	1987–present Alubijid, Claveria, El Salvador, Gitagum, Initao, Jasaan, Laguindingan, Libertad, Lugait, Manticao, Naawan, Opol, Tagoloan, Villanueva
2		Augusto Baculio	June 30, 1998	June 30, 2007	11th	LDP	Elected in 1998.	1987–present Alubijid, Claveria, El Salvador, Gitagum, Initao, Jasaan, Laguindingan, Libertad, Lugait, Manticao, Naawan, Opol, Tagoloan, Villanueva
2		Augusto Baculio	June 30, 1998	June 30, 2007	12th	LDP	Re-elected in 2001.	1987–present Alubijid, Claveria, El Salvador, Gitagum, Initao, Jasaan, Laguindingan, Libertad, Lugait, Manticao, Naawan, Opol, Tagoloan, Villanueva
2		Augusto Baculio	June 30, 1998	June 30, 2007	13th	KAMPI	Re-elected in 2004.	1987–present Alubijid, Claveria, El Salvador, Gitagum, Initao, Jasaan, Laguindingan, Libertad, Lugait, Manticao, Naawan, Opol, Tagoloan, Villanueva
3		Yevgeny Emano	June 30, 2007	June 30, 2013	14th	Nacionalista (PADAYN)	Elected in 2007.	1987–present Alubijid, Claveria, El Salvador, Gitagum, Initao, Jasaan, Laguindingan, Libertad, Lugait, Manticao, Naawan, Opol, Tagoloan, Villanueva
3		Yevgeny Emano	June 30, 2007	June 30, 2013	15th	Nacionalista (PADAYN)	Re-elected in 2010.	1987–present Alubijid, Claveria, El Salvador, Gitagum, Initao, Jasaan, Laguindingan, Libertad, Lugait, Manticao, Naawan, Opol, Tagoloan, Villanueva
4		Juliette Uy	June 30, 2013	June 30, 2022	16th	NUP	Elected in 2013.	1987–present Alubijid, Claveria, El Salvador, Gitagum, Initao, Jasaan, Laguindingan, Libertad, Lugait, Manticao, Naawan, Opol, Tagoloan, Villanueva
4		Juliette Uy	June 30, 2013	June 30, 2022	17th	NUP	Re-elected in 2016.	1987–present Alubijid, Claveria, El Salvador, Gitagum, Initao, Jasaan, Laguindingan, Libertad, Lugait, Manticao, Naawan, Opol, Tagoloan, Villanueva
4		Juliette Uy	June 30, 2013	June 30, 2022	18th	NUP	Re-elected in 2019.	1987–present Alubijid, Claveria, El Salvador, Gitagum, Initao, Jasaan, Laguindingan, Libertad, Lugait, Manticao, Naawan, Opol, Tagoloan, Villanueva
(3)		Yevgeny Emano	June 30, 2022	Incumbent	19th	Nacionalista (PADAYN)	Elected in 2022.	1987–present Alubijid, Claveria, El Salvador, Gitagum, Initao, Jasaan, Laguindingan, Libertad, Lugait, Manticao, Naawan, Opol, Tagoloan, Villanueva
(3)		Yevgeny Emano	June 30, 2022	Incumbent	20th	Nacionalista (PADAYN)	Re-elected in 2025.	1987–present Alubijid, Claveria, El Salvador, Gitagum, Initao, Jasaan, Laguindingan, Libertad, Lugait, Manticao, Naawan, Opol, Tagoloan, Villanueva

== Election results ==
=== 2025 ===
Candidate	Party	Votes	%
Yevgeny Emano (incumbent)	Nacionalista Party	241,177	90.40
Manuel Po	Independent	25,608	9.60
Total		266,785	100.00
Valid votes		266,785	78.19
Invalid/blank votes		74,408	21.81
Total votes		341,193	100.00
Registered voters/turnout		390,691	87.33
Nacionalista Party hold			
Source: Commission on Elections

=== 2022 ===
Candidate	Party	Votes	%
Yevgeny Emano	Padayon Pilipino	166,374	56.31
Julio Uy	National Unity Party	127,292	43.08
Mylene Mehila	Independent	1,794	0.61
Total		295,460	100.00
Total votes		332,881	–
Registered voters/turnout		378,384	87.97
Padayon Pilipino gain from National Unity Party			
Source: Commission on Elections

=== 2016 ===
2016 Philippine House of Representatives elections
Party	Candidate	Votes	%
NUP	Juliette Uy	139,830	62.97%
Padayun Misamis	Jun Baculio	79,392	35.75%
Independent	Manuel Po	2,833	1.27%
Total votes		222,055	100.00%

=== 2013 ===
2013 Philippine House of Representatives elections
Party	Candidate	Votes	%	±%
Nacionalista	Augusto H. Baculio			
Independent	Antonio P. Calingin			
Liberal	Jesus M. Jardin			
Independent	Juliette Uy			
Margin of victory				
Rejected ballots				
Turnout				
Independent gain from Nacionalista		Swing		

=== 2010 ===
Candidate	Party	Votes	%
Yevgeny Emano (incumbent)	Nacionalista Party	103,337	51.66
Augusto Baculio	Liberal Party	60,209	30.10
Julio Uy	Lakas–Kampi–CMD	36,483	18.24
Total		200,029	100.00
Valid votes		200,029	89.77
Invalid/blank votes		22,788	10.23
Total votes		222,817	100.00
Nacionalista Party hold			
Source: Commission on Elections

== See also ==
- Legislative districts of Misamis Oriental
