= Laguindingan =

Municipality in Misamis Oriental, Philippines

- Municipality
- Municipality of Laguindingan
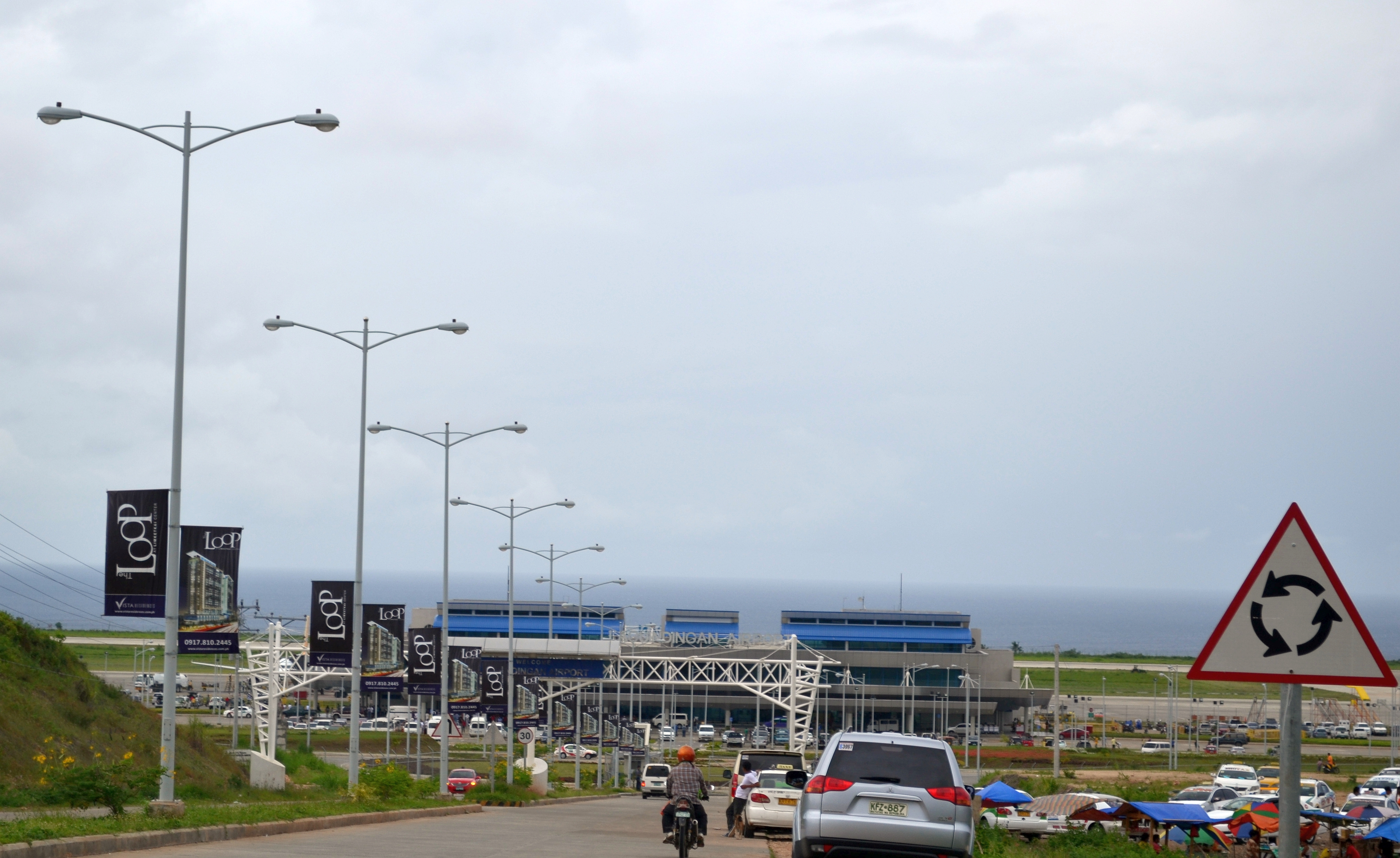
- Access Road to Laguindingan Airport

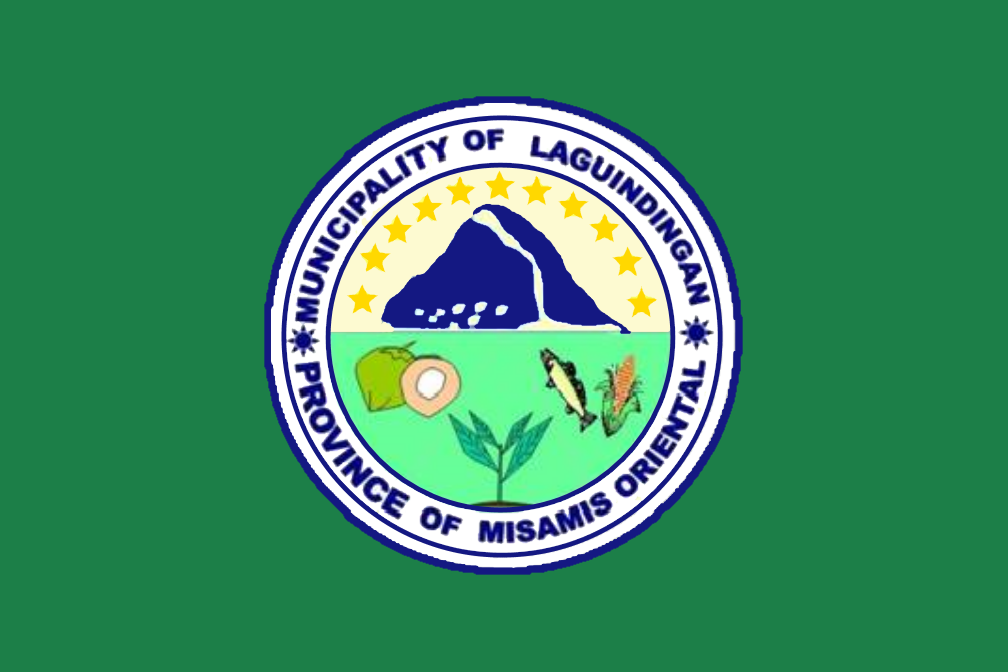
- Flag Seal
- Nickname: Gateway to Northern Mindanao
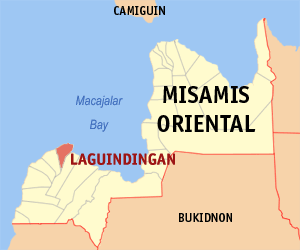
- Map of Misamis Oriental with Laguindingan highlighted
- Interactive map of Laguindingan
- Location within the Philippines
- Coordinates: 8°35′N 124°27′E
- Country: Philippines
- Region: Northern Mindanao
- Province: Misamis Oriental
- District: 2nd district
- Founded: June 8, 1963
- Barangays: 11 (see Barangays)

Government
  - Type: Sangguniang Bayan
  - Mayor: Roy I. Macua (NUP)
  - Vice Mayor: Cherwin B. Gabutin (NUP)
  - Representative: Yevgeny Vincente B. Emano (NP)
  - Municipal Council: Members: Ozellyna O. San Jose; Joseph B. Padero; Artemio G. Dalondonan; Generito W. Cuares Jr.; Lyn J. Denham; Julie C. Fajanilbo; Myrna M. Teves; Francisco N. Saburao Jr.
  - Electorate: 21,128 voters (2025)

Area
  - Total: 44.23 km^{2} (17.08 sq mi)
- Elevation: 68 m (223 ft)
- Highest elevation: 273 m (896 ft)
- Lowest elevation: 0 m (0 ft)

Population (2024 census)
  - Total: 27,688
  - Density: 626.0/km^{2} (1,621/sq mi)
  - Households: 6,397

Economy
  - Income class: 2nd municipal income class
  - Poverty incidence: 21.37% (2023)
  - Revenue: ₱ 277.6 million (2024)
  - Assets: ₱ 606.1 million (2024)
  - Expenditure: ₱ 163.1 million (2024)
  - Liabilities: ₱ 67.71 million (2024)

Service provider
  - Electricity: Misamis Oriental 1 Rural Electric Cooperative (MORESCO 1)
- Time zone: UTC+8 (PST)
- ZIP code: 9019
- PSGC: 1004314000
- IDD : area code: +63 (0)88
- Native languages: Cebuano; Binukid; Subanon; Tagalog
- Website: www.laguindingan.gov.ph

Laguindingan, officially the Municipality of Laguindingan (Cebuano: Lungsod sa Laguindingan; Tagalog: Bayan ng Laguindingan), is a municipality in the province of Misamis Oriental, Philippines. According to the 2024 census, it has a population of 27,688 people.

Its most notable landmark is the Laguindingan Airport, located between Cagayan de Oro and Iligan.

== History ==
Laguindingan used to be called "Daligdigan" coined from the words "daligdig", meaning trickling water from Soloan Creek, and "digan", a buri plant, which was used by the early settlers as roofing and walling materials. The name later evolved into "Laguindingan" because it is easier to pronounce and has a melodious sound.

The presence of an old Spanish port "Moog" at Punta Sulawan manifest the claim that before the settlers came to Laguindingan, the place was the hideout of robbers, pirates and bandoleros because of the once thick forest cover of the municipality. A brave man named Calixto Caseres together with his family moved in from Alubijid and settled for good. Other settlers (including migrants from Luzon and Visayas) followed and soon the place became a thriving community. A number of Cagayan de Oro civilians and government officials hide in Laguindingan during the second world war. Blocking force was established in Laguindingan that let Japanese soldiers to use boat instead going to Iligan. The Philippine Independent Church was the first religious order established in the early community. The religious presence was evidenced by the Chapel erected on the highest promontory now known as Salcedo's Hill. The cross still stand today. The silent witness of the establishment of the now growing town.

Laguindingan, was a sitio of Alubijid under the municipality of Cagayan de Oro. The first Barrio Teniente was Mariano Salcedo (from Kauswagan, Cagayan de Oro) which was appointed by the Alcalde de Cagayan. When Alubijid became a municipality, Proceso Pacana became the first Barrio Lieutenant until the end of World War II. Later a move to make Laguindingan a municipality was spearheaded by Glicerio Salcedo (Teniente del Barrio) who became the first Municipal Mayor of the town. The barangays that joined the move for township was known as the Sulawan Block namely: Kibaghot, Sinai, Mauswagon, Moog, Gasi, Aromahon, Tubajon, Sambulawan, Lapad and Liberty. On June 23, 1963, through House Bill No. 5612, President Diosdado Macapagal signed RA 3824, creating the municipality of Laguindingan.

Sambulawan derived from the word "Sulawan" because the place is situated on a hill or in Bisaya "ilaya" going up where the sun rises its bright lights is glaring to the eye, thus "Sulaw" in bisaya. The place is also known as a place of "sabungan" or where cock fights are held.

== Geography ==
=== Barangays ===
Laguindingan is politically subdivided into 11 barangays. Each barangay consists of puroks while some have sitios.

- Aromahon
- Gasi
- Kibaghot (San Isidro)
- Lapad
- Liberty
- Mauswagon
- Moog
- Poblacion
- Sambulawan
- Sinai
- Tubajon

=== Climate ===
Climate data for Lagindingan, Misamis Oriental
Month	Jan	Feb	Mar	Apr	May	Jun	Jul	Aug	Sep	Oct	Nov	Dec	Year
Mean daily maximum °C (°F)	28 (82)	28 (82)	29 (84)	30 (86)	30 (86)	29 (84)	29 (84)	29 (84)	29 (84)	29 (84)	28 (82)	28 (82)	29 (84)
Mean daily minimum °C (°F)	24 (75)	23 (73)	23 (73)	24 (75)	25 (77)	25 (77)	25 (77)	25 (77)	25 (77)	24 (75)	24 (75)	24 (75)	24 (76)
Average precipitation mm (inches)	271 (10.7)	217 (8.5)	193 (7.6)	178 (7.0)	344 (13.5)	423 (16.7)	362 (14.3)	358 (14.1)	329 (13.0)	320 (12.6)	322 (12.7)	260 (10.2)	3,577 (140.9)
Average rainy days	23.2	19.5	22.0	22.8	29.6	28.9	30.3	29.8	28.1	28.8	26.1	24.1	313.2
Source: Meteoblue

== Demographics ==
Population census of Laguindingan

Year	Pop.	±% p.a.
1970	10,292	—
1975	11,849	+2.87%
1980	12,059	+0.35%
1990	15,503	+2.54%
1995	16,521	+1.20%
2000	18,451	+2.40%

Year	Pop.	±% p.a.
2007	19,952	+1.08%
2010	21,822	+3.31%
2015	24,405	+2.15%
2020	26,363	+1.64%
2024	27,688	+1.18%

Source: Philippine Statistics Authority

In the 2024 census, the population of Laguindingan was 27,688 people, with a density of 630 inhabitants per square kilometre or 1,600 inhabitants per square mile.

Visayans form a majority in Laguindingan, whose ancestors came from Cebu, Bohol, Siquijor as well as Negros, Panay and Leyte who migrated to the area long before the Spaniards arrived, while the indigenous Higaonons and Binukid dwell in the municipality's remote interior. Bicolanos, Ilocanos, Kapampangans and Tagalogs from Luzon form another significant minority in Laguindingan, though in recent years after the airport was completed, many people from Luzon, Visayas and other parts of Mindanao as well as foreigners settle in the municipality in various numbers, doubling its local population. This waves of migrations have turned Laguindingan into a melting pot of cultures due to its nickname "the Gateway to Northern Mindanao".

The main language spoken in Laguindingan is Cebuano while Higaonons have their own eponymous language and it is still spoken among them, with Cebuano being their second language. Tagalog/Filipino and English are also spoken and utilized in media, business and government affairs. Other languages spoken varyingly include Bicolano, Ilocano, Hiligaynon, Kapampangan as well as Maranao, Maguindanaon and Tausug.

== Economy ==
Poverty incidence of Laguindingan (%)

Source: Philippine Statistics Authority

Laguindingan, Misamis Oriental is now the new gateway to Northern Mindanao, where the new Laguindingan Airport is located replacing the old Lumbia Airport of Cagayan de Oro. The Cooperative that has a mission or Rural Electrification sits here which is MORESCO-1 Head Office. It has a power distribution franchise for the west part of Misamis Oriental from the towns of Opol to Lugait . It operates in 15 barrios of Cagayan de Oro and the whole town and barangays of Talakag, Bukidnon and portions of barangays in Iligan City. Another growing industry is the hand crafted silk. The Mindanao silk which is woven by members of Ayala Beneficiaries Association Inc., based in Laguindingan affected by the construction of the airport. Today commercial enterprises is a thriving industry for heavy equipment, machinery and transport vehicles merchandise. Lohas Hotel and Moresco lodge are the new tourist inns available. Also beach and swimming pool is another attraction for the local which are located on Mauswagon to Tubajon road side resorts. Another tourist attraction is the Balsa of Laguindingan, the floating cottages that fuel the local economy. It had made the Town the Balsa Capital of Mindanao.

Laguindingan is also known for its Saturday sea food market also known as "tabu" in Cebuano. Sea urchins in bottles, sea weeds, sea clams and snails are sold, and the sea cucumber which is known as a cure for arthritis. Barbecued fish on sticks are known in Visayan as "tinap-an"; fish known as "pinyahin" are also sold. Fish from neighboring towns are also brought here for trade.

The common agricultural produce includes corn, cassava, copra, and tobacco.

The Saturday market had also made the town known for the livestock industry where poultry and livestock were traded. Neighboring towns Alubijid and Libertad had benefited from this trading as well as Cagayan de Oro, where here the lechon entrepreneurs get those young pork here.

Today another flourishing industry for beach tourism being developed is scuba diving where the rich exotic sea creatures are found in the coastal barangay Tubajon.

== Tourism ==
- Balsa sa Laguindingan

Located at Birhen sa Moog Bay near the punta sulawan point. It is floating cottages where groups or families can enjoy swimming and take shelter in these floating huts which can accommodate up to 30 persons. You have to ride a bangca to get there. Its docking point is now located at Moog Bay where an environment fee is collected for the municipality to sustain environment clean up.

- Binitinan Islet located at Mauswagon it is a rock formation which form like the head of a snake(bitin) with soil and trees where it is surrounded by sea.
- Tagbabanga Spring a place in Sinai where you walk distance from the National Highway. This spring is the source of potable water that is the source of drinking water not only in Barangay Sinai but to some neighboring barangays as well.
- Balete Hill also known as'Hill Top' (Buntod) a place where the old Iglesia Pilipina Independente Church site before it transferred. It is visible to everybody during Holy Week season where the people will walk towards the Holy Cruz.
- My Relaxing Terrace site in Tubajon a beach where many mangrove trees cited, the sand like Boracay sand.
- Berhen Milagrosa a place in Moog where it miracles it is site beside the sea, many people will Church there during Sunday it also become a tourist spot.
- La Cueva Con Agua Locally known as "Liyang", site in Mauswagon nearby the Barangay Hall, it is known as a place of enchanto, a cave that has water and being protected by Municipality of Laguindingan due to some superstitious belief.
- Tubajon Mang Groves
- Laguindingan Watchtower, an 18th-century watchtower built by the Spanish during the colonial era.
- Sambulawan Sinai Tagbabanga Spring and Water fall located in a river from Gitagum Misamis Oriental towards Aromahon Laguindingan Misamis Oriental.
- Our Lady of Fatima- Located in baranggay Sambulawan Laguindingan Misamis Oriental a 50 foot tall statue facing the east side to the Divine Mercy in El Salvador.

=== Town events ===
There are several notable events in the town. Each barangays or barrios has its own feast locally known as Fiesta literally as festivals honoring their patron saints after achieving recognition in their own rights.

- Tobacco Festival is a one-day festival celebration of Laguindinagan, held every month of July 12. Tobacco is Laguindinganon's center of commodity where immigrant from other province's and cities made their purchased of Tobacco every Sunday.
- Charter Day is the town's celebration of its townhood established on July 12, 1963. It is a non-working holiday and a roster of special activities is lined up annually to mark this special occasion.
- A Holy-Week Trek March or April (Movable) on the eve of Good Friday (Thursday evening), where hundreds of Laguindinganon trek towards the old Municipal Hall in "Balete Hill" for the annual Via crucis or way of the cross. This event is the town's catholic devotees in observation of the holy week.
- Miss Laguindingan (July 8) is a beauty pageant presenting the native beauty of Laguindingan ladies. It is one of the most prestigious beauty pageants in the Town.
- Town Fiesta April 20 the original town fiesta of Laguindingan. Majority of the people of Poblacion celebrating the fiesta.

== Transportation ==
Laguindingan does not have sea transportation facilities. Nearby Cagayan de Oro is the main entry point to Misamis Oriental. From there, one would then take a bus or jeepneys from the Westbound-Bulua Integrated Bus and Jeepney Terminal.

By land

- Habal-habal is the transportation in town for inner most barangays when you are in a hurry.
- Tricab is now the king of the urban road where the neighboring towns benefitted from it. It has become a local transport industry and increase commerce and had contributed to cheaper cost of transport for both neighboring and hinterland barangays.
- Laguindingan Integrated Bus Terminal is now operational since June 15, 2016, known as Laguindingan Transport Terminal since it was recently inaugurated. It caters buses to and from Iligan/Cagayan de Oro as well as the new route Balingasag town to Laguindigan direct.

By air

- Laguindingan Airport is the air transportation in town. The new airport is in barangay Moog, Laguindingan, and is expected to become a major hub for export of agricultural and trade products, and for the import of tourists to the areas around Cagayan de Oro and Iligan City. There are plans by the Philippine National Railways to connect Laguindingan to Cagayan de Oro city.

== Education ==
Public schools:

Elementary

- Laguindingan Central School
- Aromahon Elementary School
- Gasi Elementary School
- Kibaghot Elementary School
- Lapad Elementary School
- Liberty Elementary School
- Mauswagon Integrated School
- Moog Elementary School
- Sambulawan Elementary School
- Sinai Elementary School
- Tubajon Integrated School

Secondary

- Laguindingan National High School
- Kibaghot National High School
- Mauswagon Integrated School
- Tubajon Integrated School

== See also ==
- Metro Cagayan de Oro, fourth largest metropolitan area in the Philippines.
