= Phividec Industrial Estate =

- Special economic zone
- Phividec Industrial Estate in Misamis Oriental Special Economic Zone
- Phividec Building in Tagaloan
- Country: Philippines
- Region: Northern Mindanao
- Province: Misamis Oriental
- Municipalities (portions): Tagoloan and Villanueva
- Creation of Phividec: April 13, 1974

Government
  - Type: Administrating body
  - Body: Philippine Veterans Investment Development Corporation Industrial Authority

Area
  - Total: 30 km^{2} (12 sq mi)
- Time zone: UTC+8 (PST)
- Website: piamo.gov.ph

The Phividec Industrial Estate in Misamis Oriental Special Economic Zone (PIEMO-SEZ) is an industrial park spanning the municipalities of Tagoloan and Villanueva in the province of Misamis Oriental, Philippines and is one of the largest industrial estates in the country. It is under the Philippine Veterans Investment Development Corporation Industrial Authority (Phividec-IA or PHIVIDEC). It

== History ==
The managing entity of PIE-MO, the Philippine Veterans Investment Development Corporation Industrial Authority (Phividec-IA or PHIVIDEC) was established on August 13, 1974 through Presidential Decree No. 538 issued by President Ferdinand Marcos. The Phividec Industrial Estate is the first ever "Phividec Industrial Area" created under said decree.

On April 11, 2008, President Gloria Macapagal Arroyo issued Proclamation No. 1495, creating and designating 1,072 hectares (2,650 acres) of the 1,072 hectares (2,650 acres) PIEMO as a special economic zone under PEZA. Arroyo on June 29, 2010 issued Proclamation No. 2106 which converted the whole estate as a special economic zone.

== Scope ==
The Phividec Industrial Estate covers an area of 3,000 hectares (7,400 acres). It spans 13 barangays in the municipalities of Tagoloan and Villanueva in the province of Misamis Oriental. It is one of the largest industrial estates in the Philippines.

== Economy ==
Phividec is partnered with the Philippine Economic Zone Authority (PEZA). Locators within the PIEMO benefits from tax incentives under the CREATE Law.

The estate is the site for processing plants of agricultural produce in Northern Mindanao such as corn and pineapple from Bukidnon and Misamis Oriental.

A seaport mainly used by the Mindanao Container Terminal, a subsidiary of International Container Terminal Services is also located within the estate.
