= Manticao =

Municipality in Misamis Oriental, Philippines

- Municipality
- Municipality of Manticao
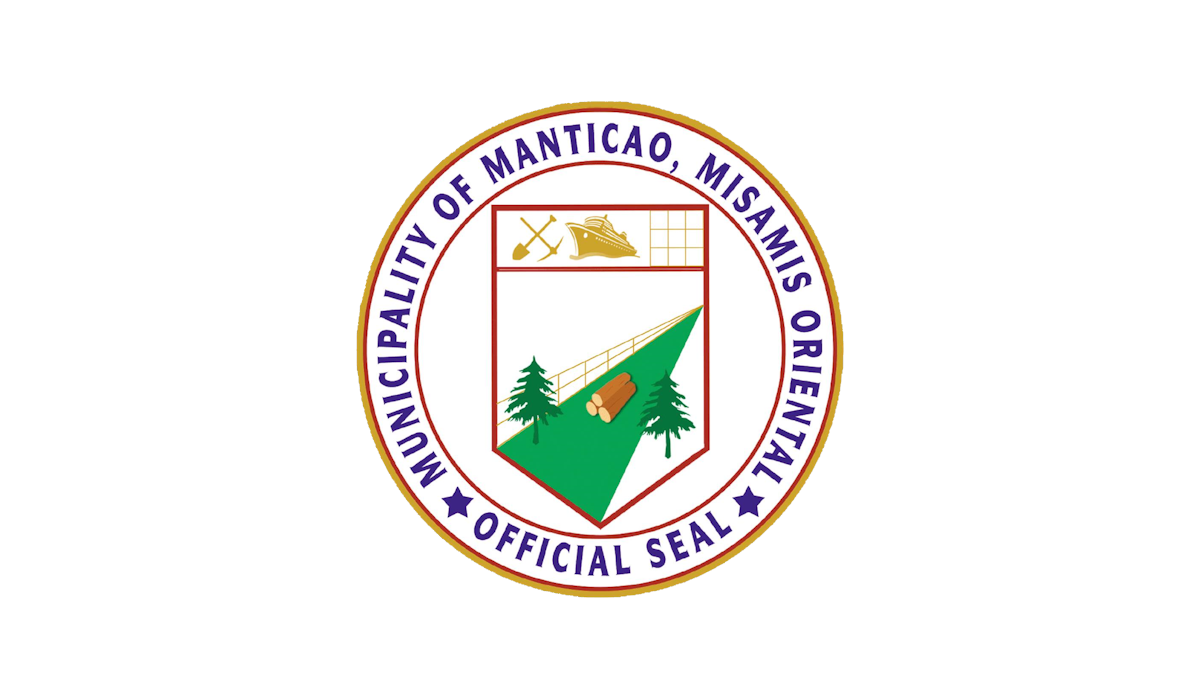
- Flag

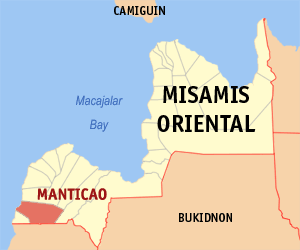
- Map of Misamis Oriental with Manticao highlighted
- Interactive map of Manticao
- Location within the Philippines
- Coordinates: 8°24′15″N 124°17′12″E
- Country: Philippines
- Region: Northern Mindanao
- Province: Misamis Oriental
- District: 2nd district
- Founded: February 7, 1949
- Barangays: 25 (see Barangays)

Government
  - Type: Sangguniang Bayan
  - Mayor: Antonio H. Baculio
  - Vice Mayor: Stephen S. Tan
  - Representative: Yevgeny Vincente B. Emano
  - Municipal Council: Members: Danden S. Catipay; Jaycel C. Macquinto; Eric F. Macacua; Bernabe B. Ely; Jessie G. Tan Jr.; Paulino B. Tinoy; Pete T. Faelnar; Lilith D. Jabla
  - Electorate: 22,125 voters (2025)

Area
  - Total: 123.01 km^{2} (47.49 sq mi)
- Elevation: 55 m (180 ft)
- Highest elevation: 436 m (1,430 ft)
- Lowest elevation: 0 m (0 ft)

Population (2024 census)
  - Total: 30,968
  - Density: 251.75/km^{2} (652.03/sq mi)
  - Households: 7,518

Economy
  - Income class: 2nd municipal income class
  - Poverty incidence: 25.4% (2023)
  - Revenue: ₱ 169.7 million (2024)
  - Assets: ₱ 485.7 million (2024)
  - Expenditure: ₱ 139.6 million (2024)
  - Liabilities: ₱ 2.526 million (2024)

Service provider
  - Electricity: Misamis Oriental 1 Rural Electric Cooperative (MORESCO 1)
- Time zone: UTC+8 (PST)
- ZIP code: 9024
- PSGC: 1004318000
- IDD : area code: +63 (0)88
- Native languages: Cebuano; Binukid; Subanon; Tagalog
- Website: www.manticao.gov.ph

Manticao, officially the Municipality of Manticao (Cebuano: Lungsod sa Manticao; Tagalog: Bayan ng Manticao), is a municipality in the province of Misamis Oriental, Philippines. According to the 2024 census, it has a population of 30,968 people.

Manticao River was known as Naawan River until 1957, when it was renamed.

In 1948, the barrio of Manticao, then part of Initao, was constituted into the town of Manticao.

== Geography ==
Manticao's geographical features consist of mountainous to flat plains to shorelines.

=== Barangays ===
Manticao is politically subdivided into 13 barangays. Each barangay consists of puroks while some have sitios.

- Argayoso
- Balintad
- Cabalantian
- Camanga
- Digkilaan
- Mahayahay
- Pagawan
- Paniangan
- Patag
- Poblacion
- Punta Silum
- Tuod
- Upper Malubog

=== Climate ===
Climate data for Manticao, Misamis Oriental
Month	Jan	Feb	Mar	Apr	May	Jun	Jul	Aug	Sep	Oct	Nov	Dec	Year
Mean daily maximum °C (°F)	28 (82)	29 (84)	30 (86)	31 (88)	30 (86)	30 (86)	30 (86)	30 (86)	30 (86)	30 (86)	29 (84)	29 (84)	30 (85)
Mean daily minimum °C (°F)	24 (75)	24 (75)	24 (75)	25 (77)	26 (79)	26 (79)	25 (77)	25 (77)	25 (77)	25 (77)	25 (77)	25 (77)	25 (77)
Average precipitation mm (inches)	271 (10.7)	217 (8.5)	193 (7.6)	178 (7.0)	344 (13.5)	423 (16.7)	362 (14.3)	358 (14.1)	329 (13.0)	320 (12.6)	322 (12.7)	260 (10.2)	3,577 (140.9)
Average rainy days	23.2	19.5	22.0	22.8	29.6	28.9	30.3	29.8	28.1	28.8	26.1	24.1	313.2
Source: Meteoblue

== Demographics ==
Population census of Manticao

Year	Pop.	±% p.a.
1960	15,212	—
1970	13,503	−1.18%
1975	15,248	+2.47%
1980	17,294	+2.55%
1990	21,443	+2.17%
1995	22,630	+1.01%

Year	Pop.	±% p.a.
2000	24,072	+1.33%
2007	25,443	+0.77%
2010	26,786	+1.89%
2015	28,422	+1.14%
2020	29,469	+0.76%
2024	30,968	+1.20%

Source: Philippine Statistics Authority

In the 2024 census, the population of Manticao was 30,968 people, with a density of 250 inhabitants per square kilometre or 650 inhabitants per square mile.

== Economy ==
Poverty incidence of Manticao (%)

Source: Philippine Statistics Authority
