= Opol =

Municipality in Misamis Oriental, Philippines

- Municipality
- Municipality of Opol
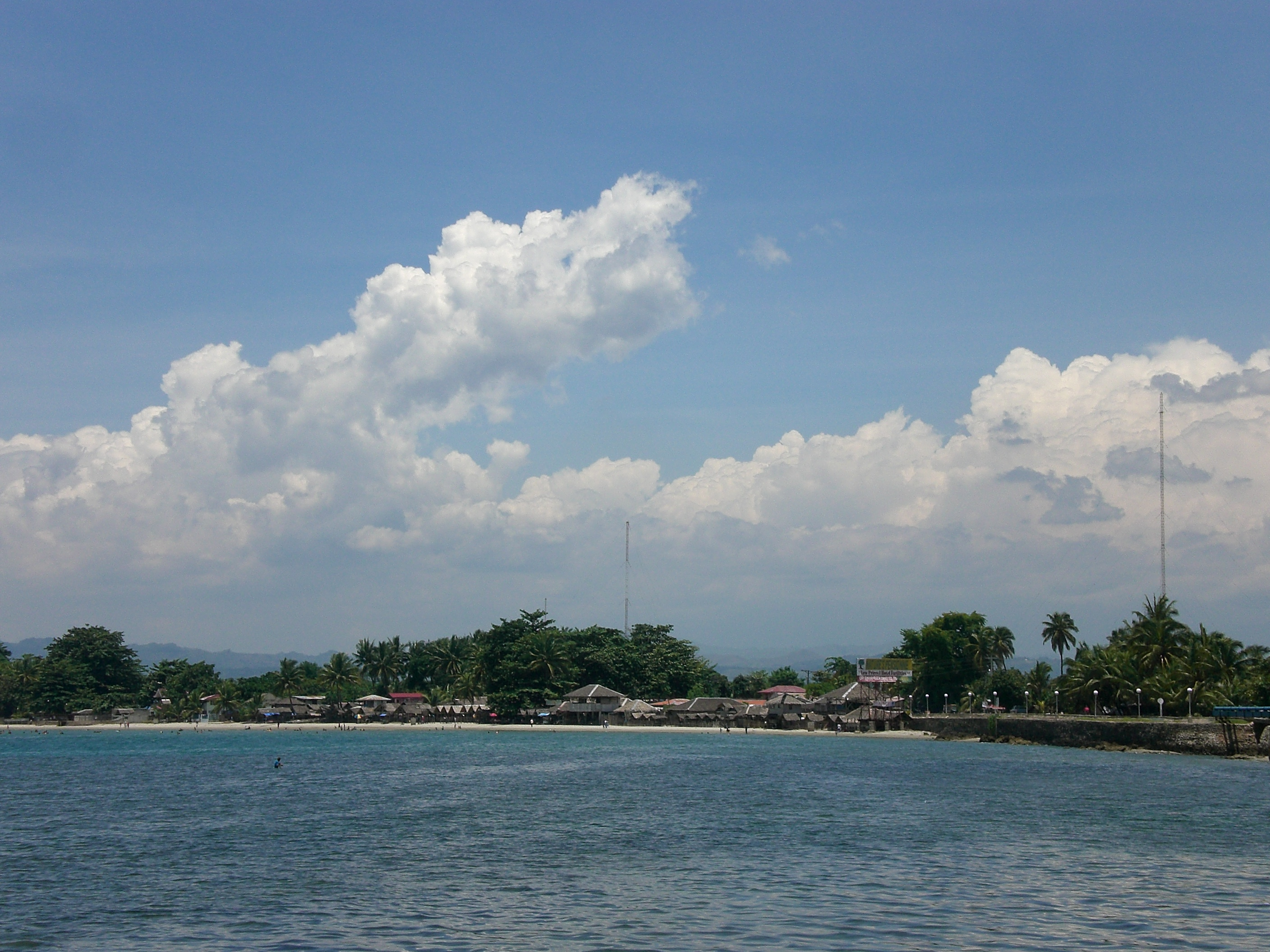
- Opol Waterfront

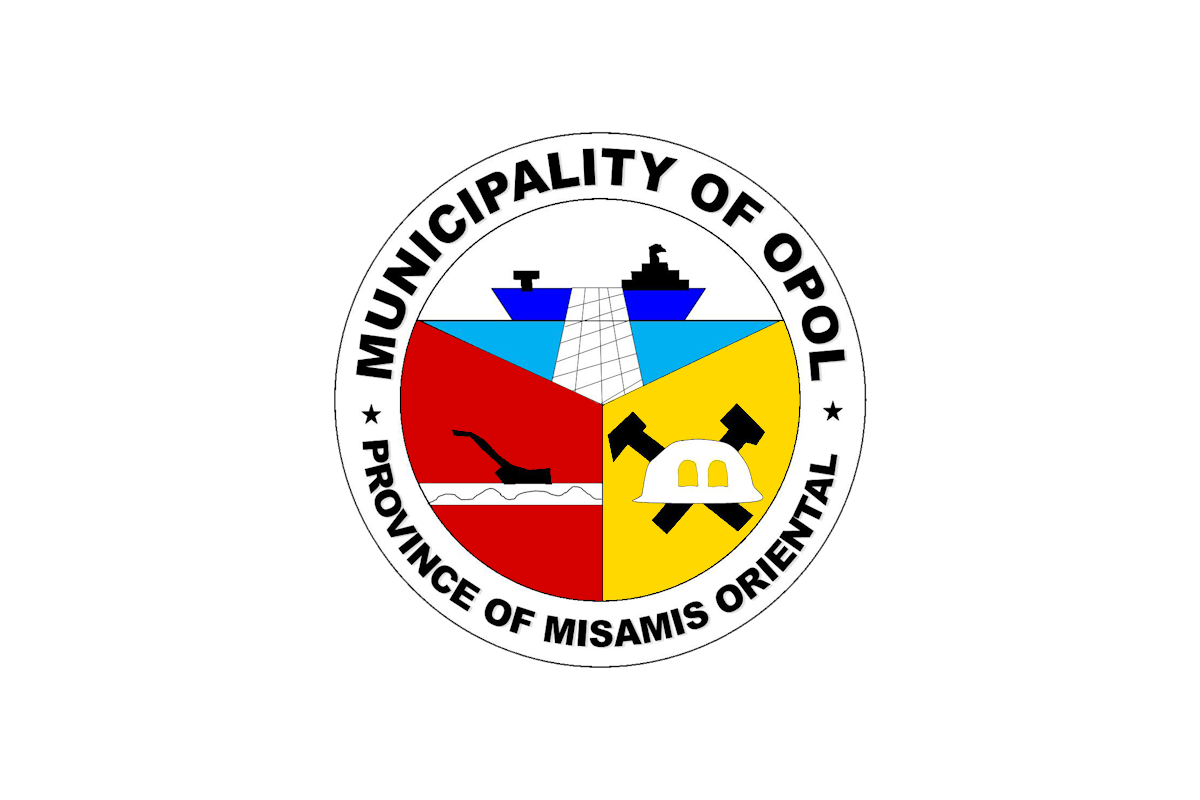
- Flag

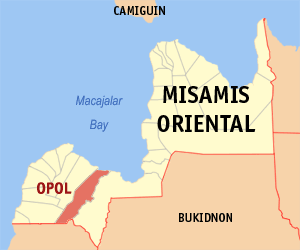
- Map of Misamis Oriental with Opol highlighted
- Interactive map of Opol
- Location within the Philippines
- Coordinates: 8°31′N 124°34′E
- Country: Philippines
- Region: Northern Mindanao
- Province: Misamis Oriental
- District: 2nd district
- Founded: June 15, 1950
- Barangays: 14 (see Barangays)

Government
  - Type: Sangguniang Bayan
  - Mayor: Jayfrancis D. Bago (PADAYN)
  - Vice Mayor: Danilo E. Daroy Jr.(PADAYN)
  - Representative: Yevgeny Vincente B. Emano (NP)
  - Municipal Council: Members: Glee A. Jacalan(NUP); Danilo O. Daroy(PADAYN); Eliezer A. Vacalares(NUP); Dr. Dante D. Roble(NUP); Chizarina M. Ortigoza(NUP); Roland B. Alfeche(PADAYN); Palmero F. Ebonia(PADAYN); Rhally Mae G. Piit(NP)
  - Electorate: 39,343 voters (2025)

Area
  - Total: 175.13 km^{2} (67.62 sq mi)
- Elevation: 25 m (82 ft)
- Highest elevation: 259 m (850 ft)
- Lowest elevation: −3 m (−9.8 ft)

Population (2024 census)
  - Total: 66,836
  - Density: 381.64/km^{2} (988.43/sq mi)
  - Households: 16,210

Economy
  - Income class: 1st municipal income class
  - Poverty incidence: 14.06% (2023)
  - Revenue: ₱ 387.2 million (2024)
  - Assets: ₱ 983 million (2024)
  - Expenditure: ₱ 348.9 million (2024)
  - Liabilities: ₱ 265.2 million (2024)

Service provider
  - Electricity: Misamis Oriental 1 Rural Electric Cooperative (MORESCO 1)
- Time zone: UTC+8 (PST)
- ZIP code: 9016
- PSGC: 1004321000
- IDD : area code: +63 (0)88
- Native languages: Cebuano; Binukid; Subanon; Tagalog
- Website: www.opolmisor.gov.ph

Opol, officially the Municipality of Opol (Cebuano: Lungsod sa Opol; Tagalog: Bayan ng Opol), is a municipality in the province of Misamis Oriental, Philippines. According to the 2024 census, it has a population of 66,836 people.

Historically, Opol was a more rural area focused on agriculture and fishing, which later attracted migrants from Luzon and Visayas in the area by the turn of 20th century. Over the years, however, the municipality is gradually becoming more urbanized, as a result of local population growth and the expansion of nearby Cagayan de Oro, due to another wave of migrants from Luzon and Visayas in the area. The subdivision of rural land for new residential housing is a matter of some controversy amongst locals. The current Mayor, Jayfrancis D. Bago (commonly known as "Jay Bago"), has held office in Opol after Maximo Seno.

== Etymology ==
The municipality's name comes from the word "opo" (white gourd), one of the widely cultivated and most abundant crops among Visayans settlers from Bohol who migrated in the area prior to Spanish colonial period. The inhabitants from the nearby village came to the area to buy the famous “opo”, until the place became popularly known as “opo”. Due to the slip of the tongue, most of the inhabitants began referring to the place as “opol”, hence the name.

== History ==
Although the first inhabitants of Opol were Higaonon people, the area was either once largely uninhabited or slightly populated before Spanish colonial period, until one group of Visayans from Bohol led by a datu, migrated to the place and settled in the area now known as Barangay Bonbon, where they planted different types of crops for their livelihood. This made Higaonons move to the mountains from coastal areas where they initially dwell prior, to avoid contact with Visayans and later from Spaniards. Those who remained then assimilated and intermarried with both Visayans and Spaniards, resulting to the presence of Spanish mestizas and mestizos in the area.

Since the end of Spanish colonial period, Opol started to grow as migrants from Luzon and Visayas as well as the Chinese and Indians flocked to the area seeking new life and various economic opportunities awaited them. Most of the migrants were experienced farmers and other agricultural workers as well as wealthy individuals consisted of Bicolanos, Hiligaynons, Ilocanos, Kapampangans, and Tagalogs in addition to Cebuanos and Boholanos, resulting to the process of Opol's urbanization from being a once largely agricultural area due to its proximity to Cagayan de Oro, where Opol was formerly part of.

Opol was created from the barrios of Opol, Igpit, and Lower Iponan, formerly part of Cagayan de Oro, by virtue of Republic Act No. 524, approved on June 15, 1950.

== Geography ==
=== Barangays ===
Opol is politically subdivided into 14 barangays. Each barangay consists of puroks while some have sitios.

- Awang
- Bagocboc
- Barra
- Bonbon
- Cauyonan
- Igpit
- Limonda
- Luyong Bonbon
- Malanang
- Nangcaon
- Patag
- Poblacion
- Taboc
- Tingalan

=== Climate ===
Climate data for Opol, Misamis Oriental
| Month | Jan | Feb | Mar | Apr | May | Jun | Jul | Aug | Sep | Oct | Nov | Dec | Year |
|---|---|---|---|---|---|---|---|---|---|---|---|---|---|
| Mean daily maximum °C (°F) | 28 (82) | 29 (84) | 30 (86) | 31 (88) | 30 (86) | 30 (86) | 30 (86) | 30 (86) | 30 (86) | 30 (86) | 29 (84) | 29 (84) | 30 (85) |
| Mean daily minimum °C (°F) | 24 (75) | 24 (75) | 24 (75) | 25 (77) | 26 (79) | 26 (79) | 25 (77) | 25 (77) | 25 (77) | 25 (77) | 25 (77) | 25 (77) | 25 (77) |
| Average precipitation mm (inches) | 271 (10.7) | 217 (8.5) | 193 (7.6) | 178 (7.0) | 344 (13.5) | 423 (16.7) | 362 (14.3) | 358 (14.1) | 329 (13.0) | 320 (12.6) | 322 (12.7) | 260 (10.2) | 3,577 (140.9) |
| Average rainy days | 23.2 | 19.5 | 22.0 | 22.8 | 29.6 | 28.9 | 30.3 | 29.8 | 28.1 | 28.8 | 26.1 | 24.1 | 313.2 |
Source: Meteoblue

== Demographics ==
Population census of Opol

| Year | Pop. | ±% p.a. |
|---|---|---|
| 1903 | 3,741 | — |
| 1960 | 10,079 | +1.75% |
| 1970 | 10,275 | +0.19% |
| 1975 | 13,023 | +4.87% |
| 1980 | 16,149 | +4.40% |
| 1990 | 20,473 | +2.40% |
| 1995 | 23,958 | +2.99% |

| Year | Pop. | ±% p.a. |
|---|---|---|
| 2000 | 36,389 | +9.37% |
| 2007 | 47,187 | +3.65% |
| 2010 | 52,108 | +3.68% |
| 2015 | 61,503 | +3.21% |
| 2020 | 66,327 | +1.60% |
| 2024 | 66,836 | +0.18% |

Source: Philippine Statistics Authority

In the 2020 census, the population of Opol, Misamis Oriental, was 66,327 people, with a density of 380 inhabitants per square kilometre or 980 inhabitants per square mile.

Visayans form the municipality's majority who descended from earlier migrants from Cebu, Bohol, Siquijor and Negros Oriental long before Spanish colonial period. Higaonons are native inhabitants of Opol despite being a minority living in municipality's inland areas. Other ethnolinguistic groups living in the municipality are Manobos, Iranuns, Maranaos, Maguindanaons and Tausugs as well as other Christian settlers from Ilocandia, Cagayan Valley, Cordillera Administrative Region, Central Luzon, Calabarzon, Mindoro, Marinduque and Bicolandia in Luzon and Panay and Negros Occidental in Visayas.

The majority of Opol's population are Roman Catholic Christians. Protestants (Baptists, Methodists, Seventh Day Adventists, Pentecostals, Evangelicals, etc.), Iglesia ni Cristo and Members Church of God International also make significant residents of the municipality. Opol also has Muslim residents mainly consist of ethnic Maranaos with Maguindanaon, Tausug and balik-Islam minorities, having two Islamic mosques located both in Barangay Barra.

Cebuano is the most widely spoken language, while Higaonon is also spoken among Opol's indigenous Higaonon tribes. Other languages spoken in the municipality are Bohol dialect of Cebuano, Hiligaynon, Ilocano, Kapampangan, Maguindanaon, Maranao and Tausug. Tagalog/Filipino and English are also widely understood and used in education, business, and administration as the national official languages.

== Economy ==
Poverty incidence of Opol (%)

Source: Philippine Statistics Authority

Key economic activities in Opol include commercial fishing, farming, tourism/hospitality, and light industry. Notable economic infrastructure includes the San Miguel/Coca-Cola bottling plant, Lechem Food Marketing, International Pharmaceuticals, Inc. (IPI), and fishing port at Luyong-Bonbon as well as the municipal market building, located adjacent to the Opol municipal centre.

The Cagayan de Oro - Iligan highway passes through Opol, alongside the coast. The highway is a key inter-regional transport route and comprises an integral part of the Cagayan de Oro - Iligan Corridor Special Development Project. This is a major infrastructure development initiative which is likely to result in significant economic growth for Opol, Misamis Oriental and the adjoining province of Lanao del Norte in coming years
