= Tagoloan, Misamis Oriental =

Municipality in Misamis Oriental, Philippines

Tagoloan
- Municipality
- Municipality of Tagoloan
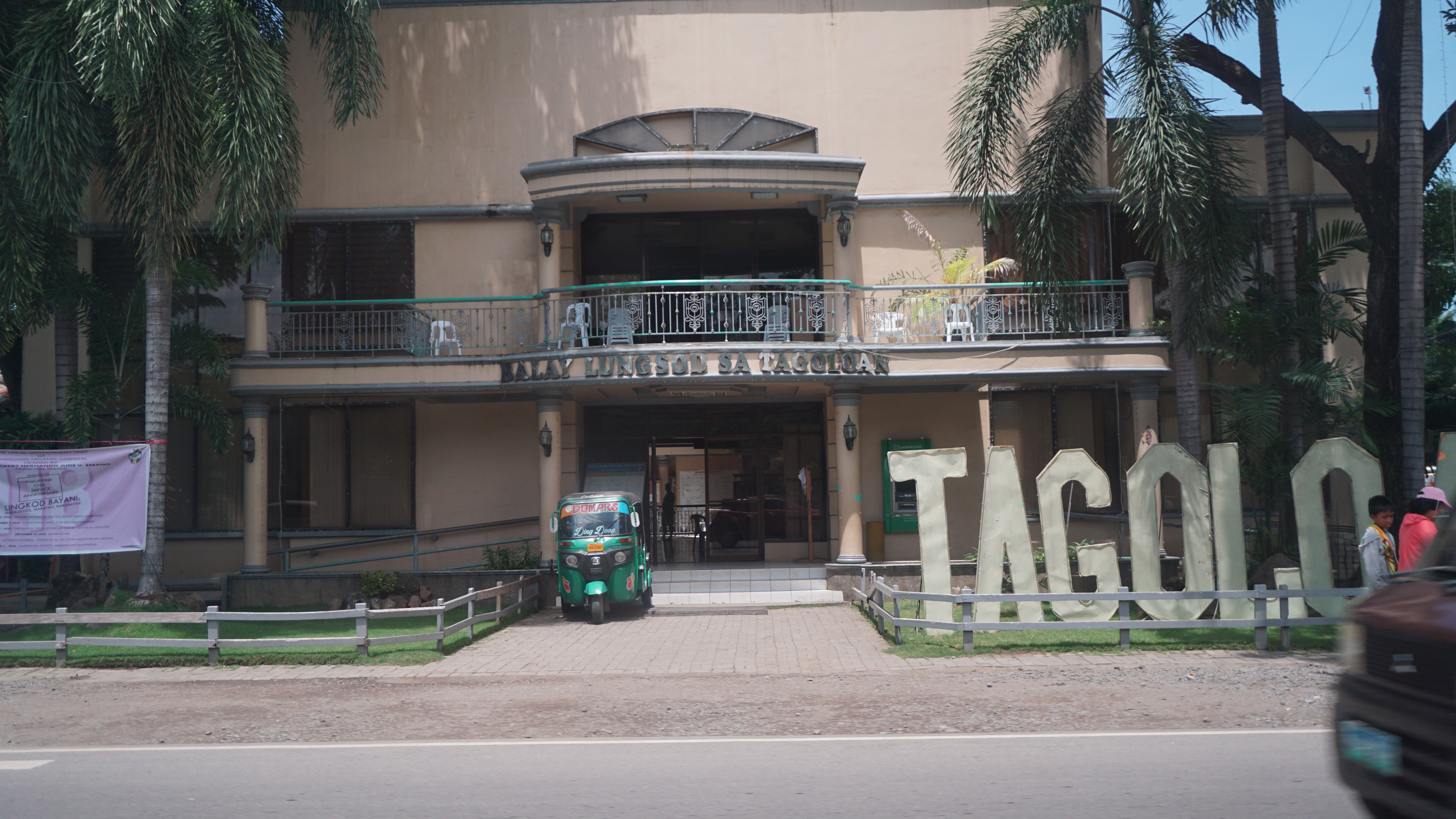
- Municipal Halls

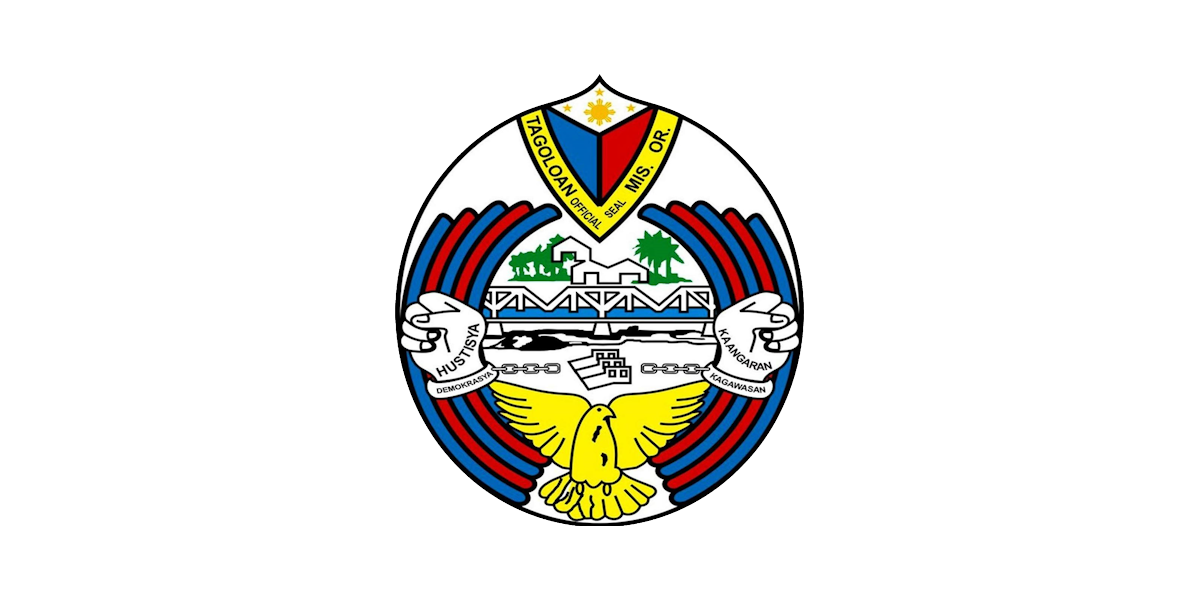
- Flag

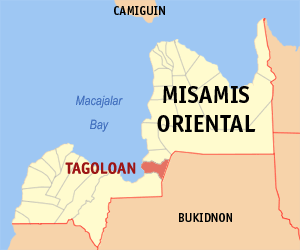
- Map of Misamis Oriental with Tagoloan highlighted
- Interactive map of Tagoloan
- Location within the Philippines
- Coordinates: 8°32′N 124°45′E
- Country: Philippines
- Region: Northern Mindanao
- Province: Misamis Oriental
- District: 2nd district
- Barangays: 10 (see Barangays)

Government
  - Type: Sangguniang Bayan
  - Mayor: Atty. Nadya Emano-Elipe
  - Vice Mayor: Robinson V. Sabio
  - Representative: Yevgeny Vincente " Bambi " B. Emano
  - Municipal Council: Members: Mikka N. Sultan; Chicque C. Co; Roger S. Achas; Cathlyn V. Alfante; Karl Marx M. Agustero; Honey Analou E. Doña; Armando C. Pomar; Audie C. Paduganan
  - Electorate: 49,826 voters (2025)

Area
  - Total: 117.73 km^{2} (45.46 sq mi)
- Elevation: 31 m (102 ft)
- Highest elevation: 375 m (1,230 ft)
- Lowest elevation: 0 m (0 ft)

Population (2024 census)
  - Total: 80,424
  - Density: 683.12/km^{2} (1,769.3/sq mi)
  - Households: 19,799

Economy
  - Income class: 1st municipal income class
  - Poverty incidence: 21.49% (2023)
  - Revenue: ₱ 672.5 million (2024)
  - Assets: ₱ 1,116 million (2024)
  - Expenditure: ₱ 646.3 million (2024)
  - Liabilities: ₱ 350.1 million (2024)

Service provider
  - Electricity: Cagayan Electric Power and Light Company (CEPALCO)
- Time zone: UTC+8 (PST)
- ZIP code: 9001
- PSGC: 1004324000
- IDD : area code: +63 (0)88
- Native languages: Cebuano; Binukid; Subanon; Tagalog
- Website: www.tagoloanmisor.gov.ph

Tagoloan, officially the Municipality of Tagoloan, is a municipality in the province of Misamis Oriental, Philippines. It is located to the east of Cagayan de Oro and located south-east of Macajalar Bay. According to the 2024 census, it has a population of 80,424 people.

== History ==
Tagoloan was among the five visitas established by the Recollect missionaries in Cagaiang (Cagayan de Oro's former name) in 1674. Through Act No. 951, issued by the Philippine Commission on October 21, 1903, which reduced the number of municipalities in the then-undivided Misamis from 24 to 10, the territories of Santa Ana and Agusan, excluding Barrio Gusa which became part of Cagayan, joined with Tagoloan. When Cagayan was converted into a city, renamed Cagayan de Oro, in 1950, barrios Agusan, Alae, and Bogo were transferred from this municipality.

=== World War II ===
Imperial Japanese forces of the Kawamura Detachment from Panay began landing on Cagayan de Misamis and Tagoloan on 3 May 1942. The town was liberated on 10 May 1945 after the Allied forces land on Cagayan de Misamis.

== Geography ==
Tagoloan is about 19 kilometres (12 mi) from the provincial capital, Cagayan de Oro.

Tagoloan total land area of 7,938 hectares represents 2.24 percent of Misamis Oriental's total area of 354,770 hectares. Among the barangays, Sta Ana is the largest, comprising 37 percent of the municipality's land area. Barangays Rosario, which includes contested areas between Municipality of Tagoloan and Municipality of Malitbog, Bukidnon and Sta Cruz, occupy relatively bigger areas (11.2%) than the other nine barangays.

The land area of Tagoloan is suitable for six major uses, which include protection forest, plantation forest, rice, tree and vine, pasture and cultivated crops. About 2,405 hectares or 30 percent of Tagoloan's total area are suitable for forest uses. Rice land is suitable for 2,199 hectares or about 28 percent, while the cultivation of annual crops are suited for 2,024 hectares or about 25 percent.

Tagoloan River that is located beside Barangay Poblacion is the 13th largest river system in the Philippines.

=== Barangays ===
Tagoloan is politically subdivided into 10 barangays. Each barangay consists of puroks while some have sitios.

Barangay	Area (hectares)	Population (2010)
Baluarte	289	9,306
Casinglot	680	8,588
Gracia	83	1,847
Mohon	282	3,648
Natumolan	622	7,674
Poblacion	341	10,258
Rosario	1,728	871
Santa Ana	2,934	6,283
Santa Cruz	890	11,490
Sugbongcogon	87	3,885
Total	7,938	63,850

Note: Barangay Rosario includes contested areas between the Municipalities of Tagoloan and Malitbog, Bukidnon, equal to 658.5 hectares (1,627 acres).

Landmarks found here are the following:

- MCT – Mindanao Container Port, located in Casinglot, Tagoloan
- FDC – First Distribution Corporation, located in Sihayun, Tagoloan
- MDC – Mindanao Distribution Center of Fast Services Corporation, located in Natumolan, Tagoloan
- CDC – Cagayan Distribution Center of Fast Services Corporation, located in Casinglot, Tagoloan

=== Climate ===
Climate data for Tagoloan, Misamis Oriental
Month	Jan	Feb	Mar	Apr	May	Jun	Jul	Aug	Sep	Oct	Nov	Dec	Year
Mean daily maximum °C (°F)	28 (82)	29 (84)	30 (86)	31 (88)	30 (86)	30 (86)	30 (86)	30 (86)	30 (86)	30 (86)	29 (84)	29 (84)	30 (85)
Mean daily minimum °C (°F)	24 (75)	24 (75)	24 (75)	25 (77)	26 (79)	26 (79)	25 (77)	25 (77)	25 (77)	25 (77)	25 (77)	25 (77)	25 (77)
Average precipitation mm (inches)	271 (10.7)	217 (8.5)	193 (7.6)	178 (7.0)	344 (13.5)	423 (16.7)	362 (14.3)	358 (14.1)	329 (13.0)	320 (12.6)	322 (12.7)	260 (10.2)	3,577 (140.9)
Average rainy days	23.2	19.5	22.0	22.8	29.6	28.9	30.3	29.8	28.1	28.8	26.1	24.1	313.2
Source: Meteoblue

== Demographics ==
Population census of Tagoloan

Year	Pop.	±% p.a.
1903	7,302	—
1918	10,985	+2.76%
1939	12,444	+0.60%
1948	11,045	−1.32%
1960	11,601	+0.41%
1970	11,468	−0.12%
1975	14,958	+5.47%
1980	22,023	+8.04%

Year	Pop.	±% p.a.
1990	33,919	+4.41%
1995	40,929	+3.58%
2000	46,649	+2.84%
2007	56,499	+2.68%
2010	63,850	+4.55%
2015	73,150	+2.62%
2020	80,319	+1.99%
2024	80,424	+0.03%

Source: Philippine Statistics Authority

In the 2024 census, the population of Tagoloan was 80,424 people, with a density of 680 inhabitants per square kilometre or 1,800 inhabitants per square mile.

=== Religion ===
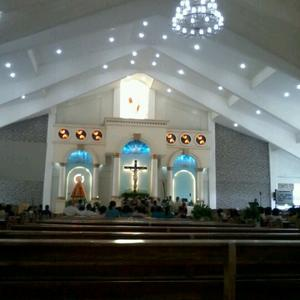
The altar of the Nuestra Señora de la Candelaria Parish

Majority or about 80% of the people in Tagoloan are Roman Catholic Christians. The Church of Nuestra Señora de la Candelaria, also known as the Tagoloan Church, is situated beside St. Mary's Academy of Tagoloan and fronting Tagoloan Plaza. The current parish priest is Rev. Fr. Enerio Tacastacas and his assistant vicar is Rev. Fr. Vincente Cervantes. The image commemorates the Presentation of Jesus at the Temple. Its feast is on February 2.

=== Ethnicities and languages ===
Like the rest of Misamis Oriental, Higaonons are among Tagoloan's native ethnolinguistic inhabitants. The majority of the municipality's residents, however, speak Cebuano as its main language, brought by Visayan settlers from Cebu, Bohol, Siquijor and Negros Oriental. Being bordered by Cagayan de Oro from its west, Tagoloan has becoming urbanized due to the massive influx of migrants from Luzon and other parts of Visayas, with many of whom had already settled in Cagayan de Oro had soon found its new home in the municipality since postwar or early 1950's, making Higaonons a minority in their own homeland but resulting from local population growth and the expansion of nearby Cagayan de Oro. These newcomers consisted of Bicolanos, Hiligaynons, Ilocanos, Kapampangans and Tagalogs seeking new and better life and various economic opportunities in Tagoloan had assimilated to and intermarried with the local population, both native Higaonons and earlier Visayan settlers alike. Alongside Cebuano, Tagalog and English are also spoken and used in business and government affairs. Other languages spoken varyingly include the indigenous Higaonon, as well as Bicolano, Hiligaynon, Ilocano and Kapampangan.

== Economy ==
Phividec Industrial Estate

Poverty incidence of Tagoloan (%)

Source: Philippine Statistics Authority

=== Crops ===
Agriculture plays a major role in Tagoloan's economy especially towards supporting agri-industrialization. But because of its industrialization and urbanization, Tagoloan's agriculture land areas have been permanently diminished.

During the last five years, a sizeable agricultural area was virtually unproductive due to encroachment of industries in prime tillable land.

The major agricultural crops in the area are corn, coconut, mango, peanut, rice, banana, and papaya.

=== Poultry and livestock ===
Poultry production, particularly chicken, increased from 70,000 birds in 1995 to 136,542 in 1999, and continuously rose to 226,452 birds in 2002 to 374,000 birds in 2003. The increase in poultry production was mainly due to the advent of broiler contract growing in the area. Multinational companies led by Swift, San Miguel Corporation, and Vitarich contributed to the growth of poultry production.

The cattle population of Tagoloan has decreased from 2,356 heads in 2002 to 1,102 heads in 2003. Carabao, swine, and goat-sheep populations decreased in production due to lack of interest in raising them and the high cost of investment.

=== Fishery ===
There are three fishing grounds in Tagoloan, Barangays Baluarte, Sugbongcogon, and Casinglot Macajalar Bay. Volume of catch from Baluarte – Macajalar Bay amounted to 4,500 kilograms (9,900 lb) per month. In Casinglot – Macajalar Bay, the volume of fishes summed to per month and Sugbongcogon – Macajalar Bay to 90 kilograms (200 lb) per month with an estimated total volume of catch of about 80,460 kilograms (177,380 lb) per month in 2003.
