= Alubijid =

Municipality in Misamis Oriental, Philippines

- Municipality
- Municipality of Alubijid
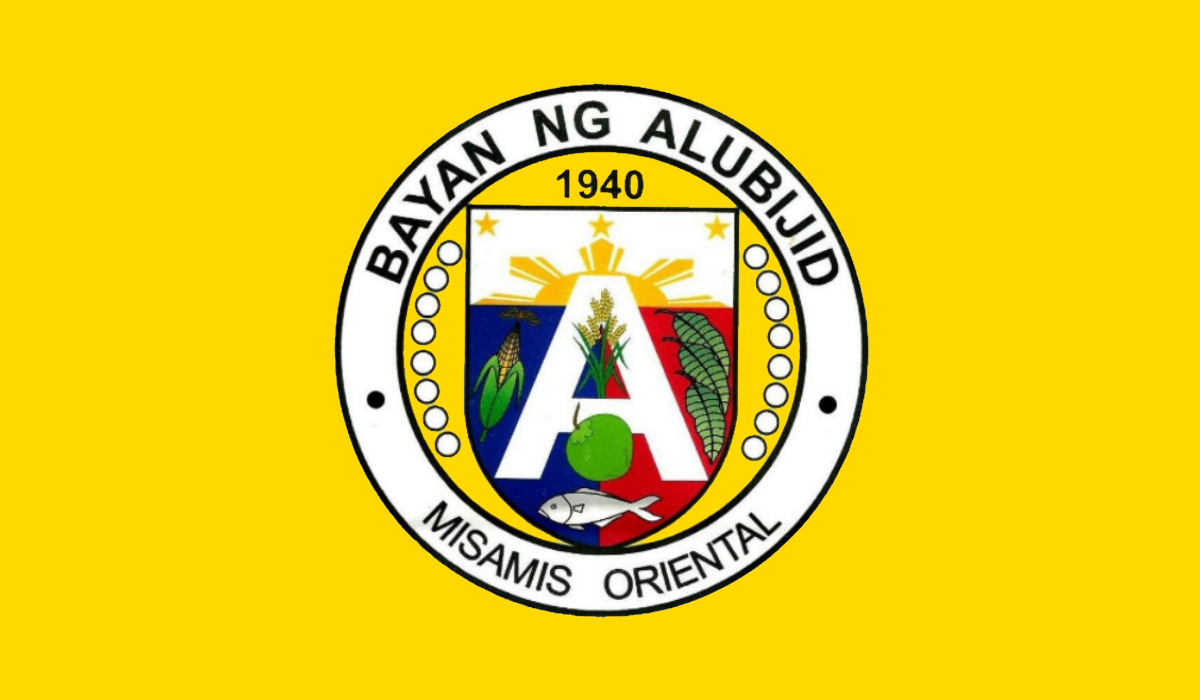
- Flag Seal

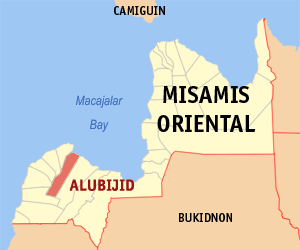
- Map of Misamis Oriental with Alubijid highlighted
- Interactive map of Alubijid
- Location within the Philippines
- Coordinates: 8°34′17″N 124°28′30″E
- Country: Philippines
- Region: Northern Mindanao
- Province: Misamis Oriental
- District: 2nd district
- Barangays: 16 (see Barangays)

Government
  - Type: Sangguniang Bayan
  - Mayor: Emmanuel L. Jamis
  - Vice Mayor: Rhanndy L. Akut
  - Representative: Yevgeny Vincente B. Emano
  - Municipal Council: Members: Krisyl Jane R. Badoles; Sonia J. Chang; Joar J. Dy; Sarhento M. Labis; Ferdinand A. Macahilos; Billy C. Macalaguing; Nikki Paolo M. Elarmo; Joel B. Abriol; Kirby Kent Benedict S. Undaya
  - Electorate: 22,250 voters (2025)

Area
  - Total: 85.56 km^{2} (33.03 sq mi)
- Elevation: 51 m (167 ft)
- Highest elevation: 182 m (597 ft)
- Lowest elevation: 0 m (0 ft)

Population (2024 census)
  - Total: 35,411
  - Density: 413.9/km^{2} (1,072/sq mi)
  - Households: 8,713

Economy
  - Income class: 1st municipal income class
  - Poverty incidence: 20.91% (2023)
  - Revenue: ₱ 304.7 million (2024)
  - Assets: ₱ 710.7 million (2024)
  - Expenditure: ₱ 191.2 million (2024)
  - Liabilities: ₱ 96.96 million (2024)

Service provider
  - Electricity: Misamis Oriental 1 Rural Electric Cooperative (MORESCO 1)
- Time zone: UTC+8 (PST)
- ZIP code: 9018
- PSGC: 1004301000
- IDD : area code: +63 (0)88
- Native languages: Cebuano; Binukid; Subanon; Tagalog
- Website: www.alubijidmisor.gov.ph

Alubijid (locally [ɐlʊˈbihɪd]), officially the Municipality of Alubijid (Cebuano: Lungsod sa Alubijid; Tagalog: Bayan ng Alubijid), is a municipality in the province of Misamis Oriental, Philippines. According to the 2024 census, it has a population of 35,411 people.

== Etymology ==
According to oral tradition, the town's name is derived from the local term for the hog plum tree (Spondias pinnata)—alubijid or alubihod. The trees grew along the town's coast and were used as landmarks by traders. Historical variations of the spelling include: Alubigid, Alubuhid, Alubijig, and Alubid.

== History ==
The origin of the town’s name “ALUBIJID” could be traced during the pre-Spanish time when what is now Barangay Baybay had been dotted by big trees named Alubijid. Legend had it that some of these trees had become landmarks particularly the huge ones that had grown near the “Bukana” of a river and a “Looc” which had been the landing site of different traders from other islands of the archipelago. From these traders, the place where they used to land had been called “Alubijid”.

The natives whom the traders visited had congregated on a place called Ilihan Hill near a river. It was an ideal dwelling place of the natives since from its summit one could see Macajalar Bay even the seas beyond Sulawan Point and could immediately view the incoming vessels of any traders and marauders. The place was also called “CALUMAT” coined from the words “Cauban, Agpas, Lukso, Ugma, Mamatay, Anak Tanan” a password adopted by the natives to warn them of surprise attacks of pirates and other marauders.

The natives’ settlement had expanded to as far as Barangays Talaba and Sampatulog which are also elevated areas. Recent findings showed that some residents of the area had excavated Chinese porcelains, brass gongs and old coins in these areas. Active trading between the natives in these places and visiting traders had continued up to the Spanish time and these areas had become the core of Spanish influence in the late 16th century.

Dean Manuel Gapuz who conducted investigations and researches of the history of the town noted that these settlement had been visited by Sultan Kudarat of Cotabato when he was recruiting forces to fight against the invading Spaniards. Some of Kudarat’s men had stayed in the place and intermarried with the natives. He further noted that as early as 1861, Alubijid was already an established community headed by local leaders until the outbreak of Philippine revolution against Spain in 1896.

During the American occupation in the early 20th century, Alubijid was organized as a barrio under Cagayan. From this modest beginning, it eventually developed into the present-day municipality.

On May 26, 1933, the Municipal Council of Cagayan, Misamis Oriental had passed Resolution No. 290 recommending the barrios of El Salvador and Alubijid to become two separate district municipalities. Immediately the people of Alubijid headed by Atty. Daniel S. Galarrita had made a petition for the creation of Alubijid into a municipality. He was supported by Ricardo Abellanosa, Vicente A. Sabellina, Timoteo Balacuit, Sr., Wenceslao Abellanosa, Quirico Villastique, Remedios Jamis Generalao, Onofre Ubay-ubay, Felix M. Roxas, Sixto M. Roxas, Ismael B. Labis, Arcadio Balacuit, Luis Balacuit, Lope Madjos, Bernabe Pacamalan, Eugenio Madrid and Juanario Macalaguing among others. So that on June 4, 1933, Provincial Governor Segundo Gaston promised the people of Alubijid who were gathered on assembly that he will personally bring the petition for the creation of Alubijid into a municipality and work for the approval with the Department of Interior in Manila.

At last, on November 14, 1937, the Undersecretary of the Interior, Honorable Rufino Luna sent to the Provincial Board of Misamis Oriental a communication outlining the necessary requirements for the creation of a new municipality of Alubijid. On December 21, 1938, the petitioners promptly prepared the requirements and after more than a year of preparation had sent it back to the Secretary of Interior for action. And finally, on April 18, 1939, the Department of the Interior submitted to the President of the Philippines with favorable recommendation for the organized portion of the municipality of Cagayan to form into an independent municipality of Alubijid.

On April 5, 1940, His Excellency Manuel L. Quezon, President of the Commonwealth of the Philippines signed Executive Order No. 266 creating the Municipality of Alubijid from the portion of the Municipality of Cagayan, Misamis Oriental. The new born municipality was formally inaugurated on July 1, 1940 with Don Gregorio Pelaez, the Provincial Governor inducting the newly appointed officials who were as follows: Timoteo Balacuit, Sr., Municipal Mayor; Ismael B. Labis, Municipal Vice-Mayor; Felix Roxas, Bernabe Pacamalan, Eugenio Madrid, Bartolome Tabura, Timoteo Abejo, Lino Maagad as Municipal Councilors.

== Geography ==
=== Barangays ===
Alubijid is politically subdivided into 16 barangays. Each barangay consists of puroks while some have sitios.

- Baybay
- Benigwayan
- Calatcat
- Lagtang
- Lanao
- Loguilo
- Lourdes
- Lumbo
- Molocboloc
- Poblacion
- Sampatulog
- Sungay
- Talaba
- Taparak
- Tugasnon
- Tula

=== Climate ===
Climate data for Alubijid, Misamis Oriental
Month	Jan	Feb	Mar	Apr	May	Jun	Jul	Aug	Sep	Oct	Nov	Dec	Year
Mean daily maximum °C (°F)	28 (82)	29 (84)	30 (86)	31 (88)	30 (86)	30 (86)	30 (86)	30 (86)	30 (86)	30 (86)	29 (84)	29 (84)	30 (85)
Mean daily minimum °C (°F)	24 (75)	24 (75)	24 (75)	25 (77)	26 (79)	26 (79)	25 (77)	25 (77)	25 (77)	25 (77)	25 (77)	25 (77)	25 (77)
Average precipitation mm (inches)	271 (10.7)	217 (8.5)	193 (7.6)	178 (7.0)	344 (13.5)	423 (16.7)	362 (14.3)	358 (14.1)	329 (13.0)	320 (12.6)	322 (12.7)	260 (10.2)	3,577 (140.9)
Average rainy days	23.2	19.5	22.0	22.8	29.6	28.9	30.3	29.8	28.1	28.8	26.1	24.1	313.2
Source: Meteoblue

== Demographics ==
Population census of Alubijid

Year	Pop.	±% p.a.
1903	2,634	—
1948	20,091	+4.62%
1960	27,330	+2.60%
1970	11,720	−8.11%
1975	13,942	+3.54%
1980	15,443	+2.07%
1990	19,531	+2.38%

Year	Pop.	±% p.a.
1995	21,765	+2.05%
2000	23,397	+1.56%
2007	25,154	+1.00%
2010	26,648	+2.12%
2015	29,724	+2.10%
2020	32,163	+1.67%
2024	35,411	+2.34%

Source: Philippine Statistics Authority

In the 2024 census, the population of Alubijid was 35,411 people, with a density of 410 inhabitants per square kilometre or 1,100 inhabitants per square mile.

== Economy ==
Poverty incidence of Alubijid

Source: Philippine Statistics Authority

== Education ==
College:

- University of Science and Technology of Southern Philippines (Main Campus)
- Bukidnon State University - Alubijid Campus

High schools:

- Alubijid National Comprehensive High School
- Lourdes National High School
- Living Hope Christian Academy (Private)

Elementary schools:

- Alubijid Central School
- Baybay Elementary School
- Benigwayan Elementary School
- Calatcat Elementary School
- Lagtang Elementary School
- Lanao Elementary School
- Loguilo Elementary School
- Lourdes Elementary School
- Lumbo Elementary School
- Molocboloc Elementary School
- Sampatulog Elementary School
- Sungay Elementary
- Talaba Elementary School
- Taparak Elementary School
- Tugasnon Elementary School
- Tula Elementary School
