= Butuan–Cagayan de Oro–Iligan Road =

Major highway in Mindanao, Philippines

Butuan–Cagayan de Oro–Iligan Road
- Butuan–Cagayan de Oro–Iligan–Tukuran Road
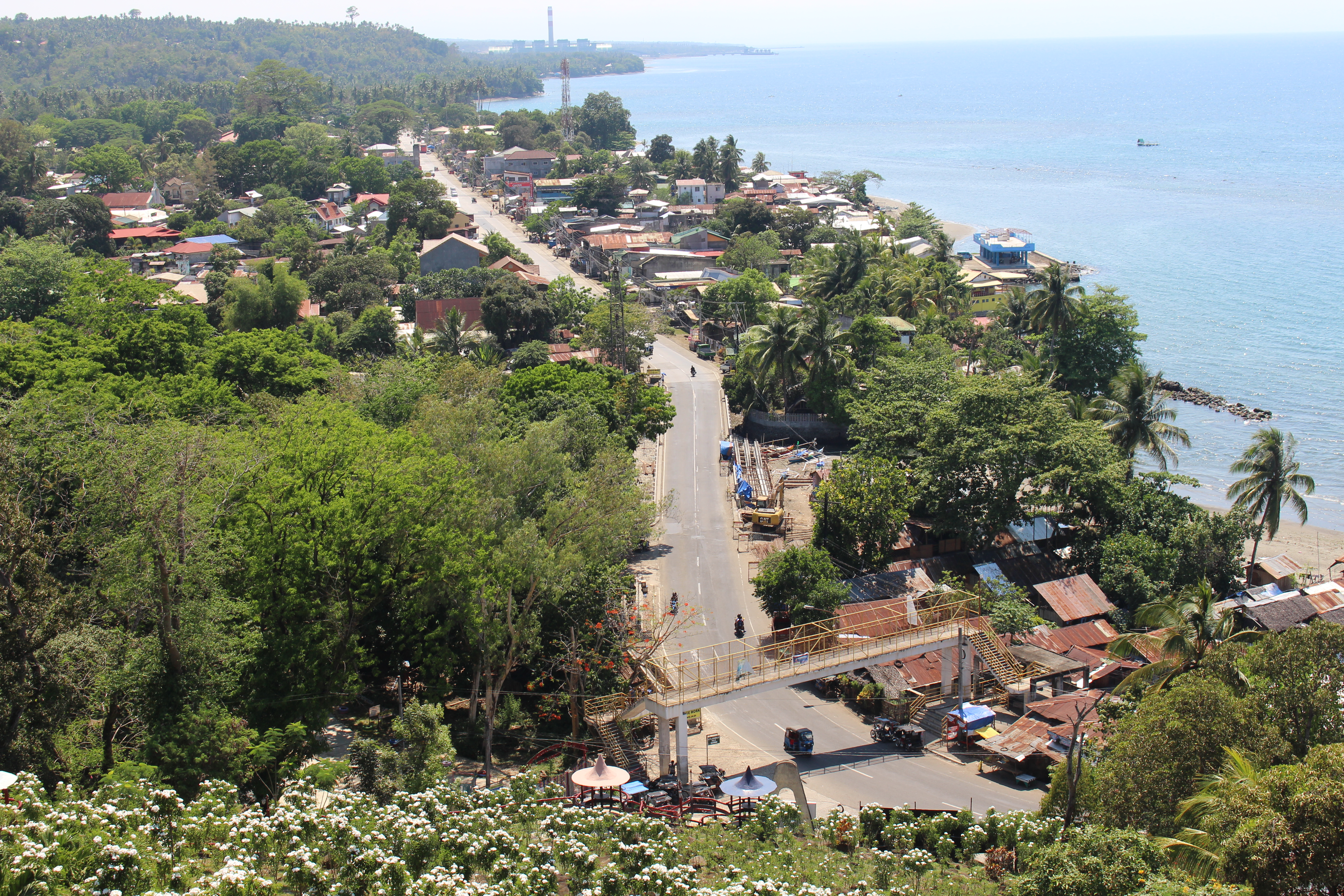
- Portion of the N9 Highway between Iligan and Linamon, Lanao del Norte

Route information
- Maintained by Department of Public Works and Highways
- Length: 416 km (258 mi)
- Component highways: N9

Major junctions
- East end: AH 26 (N1) (Surigao-Butuan National Highway) in Butuan
- N952 (Butuan–Masao Port Road) in Butuan; N951 (Mayor Democrito D. Plaza II Avenue) in Butuan; N951 (Mayor Democrito D. Plaza II Avenue) / N954 (Airport Road) in Butuan; N953 (Nasipit Port Road) in Nasipit; N955 (Gingoog–Claveria–Villanueva Road / Gingoog Wharf Road) in Gingoog; N955 (Gingoog–Claveria–Villanueva Road) in Villanueva, Misamis Oriental; AH 26 (N10) (Sayre Highway) in Cagayan de Oro; N945 (Don A. Velez Street) / N946 (Cagayan de Oro Port Road) in Cagayan de Oro; N946 (Corrales Street Extension) / Corrales Avenue in Cagayan de Oro; N945 (Carmen–Patag–Bulua Road) in Cagayan de Oro; N956 (Quezon Avenue) / Quezon Avenue Extension in Iligan; N77 (Misamis Oriental–Maria Cristina Boundary Road) in Iligan; N957 (Tubod Wharf Road) / Tubod–Ganassi Road in Tubod, Lanao del Norte; N78 (Ozamiz–Pagadian Road) in Aurora, Zamboanga del Sur
- West end: AH 26 (N1) (Maharlika Highway) in Tukuran

Location
- Country: Philippines
- Provinces: Agusan del Norte, Misamis Oriental, Lanao del Norte, Zamboanga del Sur
- Major cities: Butuan, Gingoog, Cagayan de Oro, El Salvador, Iligan
- Towns: Buenavista, Nasipit, Carmen, Magsaysay, Medina, Talisayan, Balingoan, Kinoguitan, Sugbongcogon, Binuangan, Salay, Lagonglong, Balingasag, Jasaan, Tagoloan, Opol, Alubijid, Laguindingan, Gitagum, Libertad, Initao, Naawan, Manticao, Lugait, Linamon, Kauswagan, Bacolod, Maigo, Kolambugan, Tubod, Baroy, Lala, Kapatagan, Aurora, Tukuran

Highway system
- Roads in the Philippines; Highways; Expressways; List
← N8	→ N10

The Butuan–Cagayan de Oro–Iligan Road, or Butuan–Cagayan de Oro–Iligan–Tukuran Road, is a 416-kilometer (258 mi), two-to-six lane major thoroughfare, connecting the provinces of Agusan del Norte, Misamis Oriental, Lanao del Norte, and Zamboanga del Sur.

== Route description ==
=== Butuan to Cagayan de Oro ===
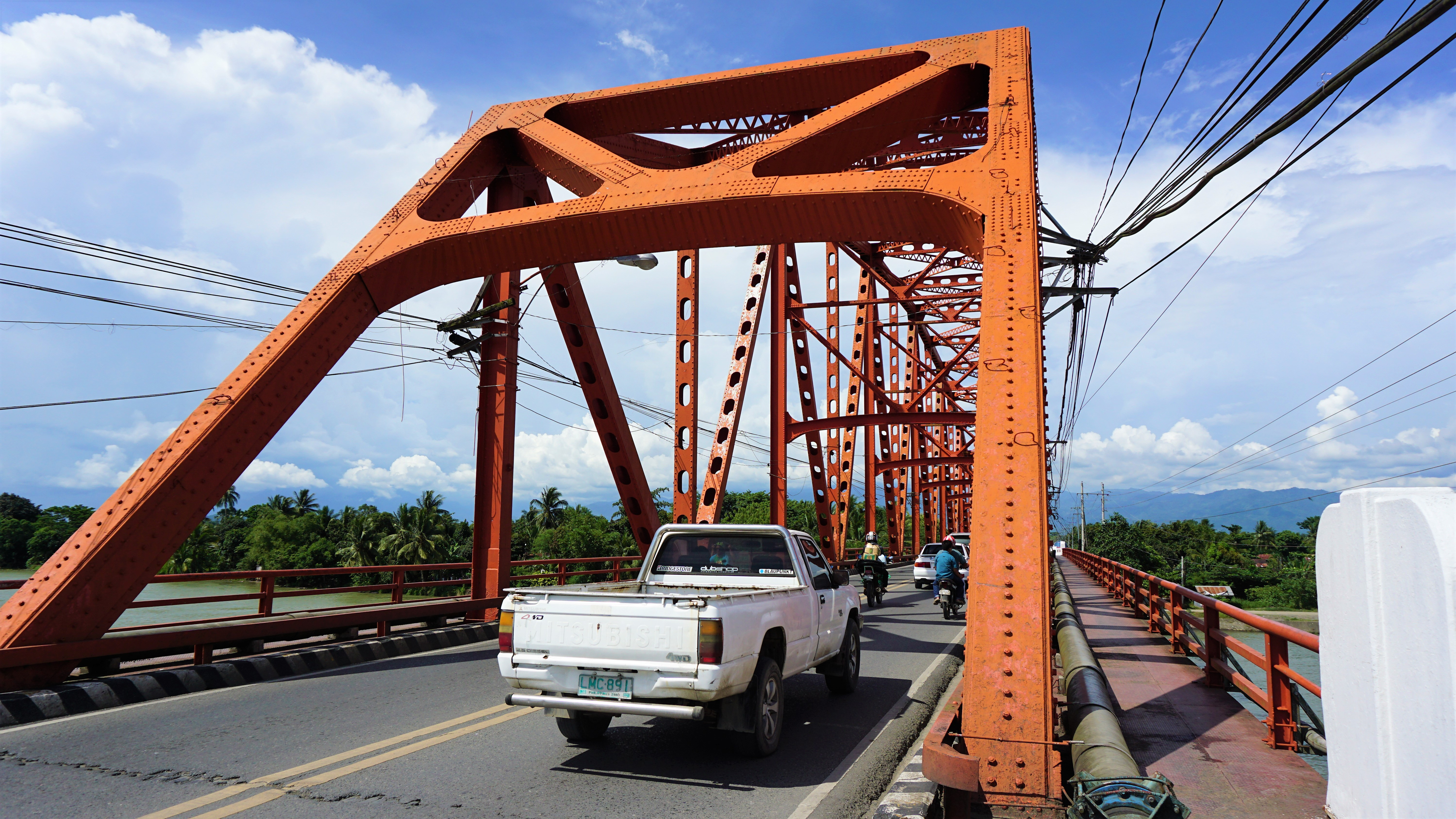
Magsaysay Bridge carries Butuan–Cagayan de Oro–Iligan Road over Agusan River in Butuan.

The highway starts at the junction with the Maharlika Highway (Surigao-Butuan National Highway) in Ampayon, Butuan. In the province of Agusan del Norte, including Butuan, it is alternatively known as Agusan–Misamis Oriental Road. It then crosses the Agusan River via Magsaysay Bridge and traverses the poblacion area of Butuan as J.C. Aquino Avenue. Past Butuan, it soon enters the coastal municipalities of Buenavista, Nasipit, and Carmen as it follows near the Agusan del Norte's coast with Butuan Bay before reaching the province of Misamis Oriental.

At Misamis Oriental, it traverses Magsaysay, the city of Gingoog (where it is locally known as J.J. Ganaban Avenue), Medina, Talisayan, Balingoan, Kinoguitan, Sugbongcogon, Binuangan, Salay, Lagonglong, Balingasag, Jasaan, and Tagoloan as it follows the provincial coastline with Gingoog Bay and Macajalar Bay.

=== Cagayan de Oro to Iligan ===
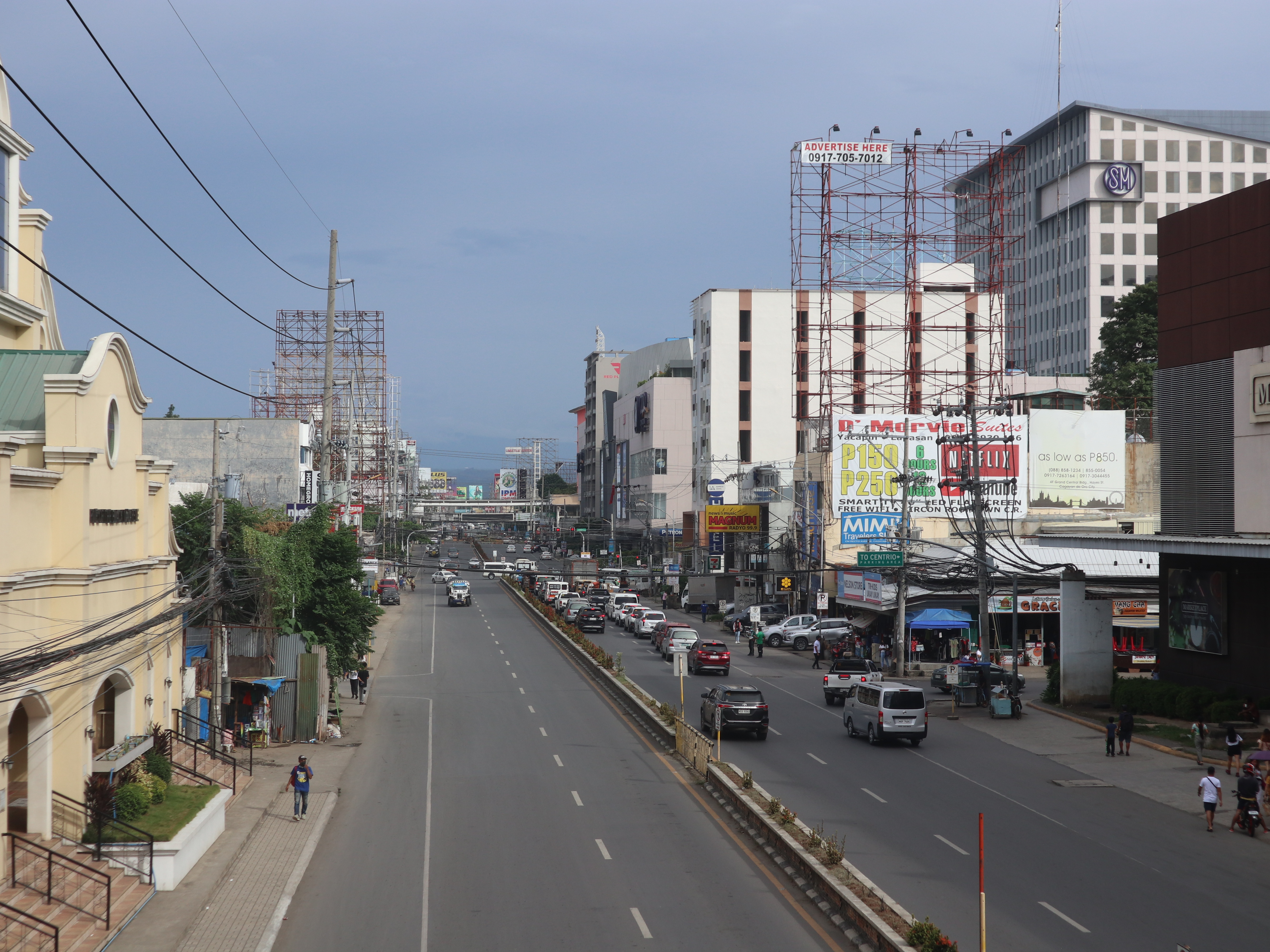
Portion of the highway as Claro M. Recto Avenue in Cagayan de Oro

The highway enters Cagayan de Oro, where it intersects with Sayre Highway. It would then traverse the downtown as Claro M. Recto Avenue. It then continues its course to the west towards other settlements of Misamis Oriental such as Opol, El Salvador, Alubijid, Laguindingan (where the highway is connected to the Laguindingan Airport), Gitagum, Libertad, Initao, Naawan, Manticao, and Lugait. The road is named Misamis Oriental–Maria Cristina Boundary Road.

=== Iligan to Tukuran ===
The highway then enters the city of Iligan, where it is alternatively known as the Misamis Oriental-Ma. Cristina Boundary Road from near the city boundary with Lugait, Misamis Oriental to Iligan–Marawi Road in barangay Maria Cristina and Overton-Buru-un Boundary Road from thereon to the city boundary with Linamon, Lanao del Norte at Agus Bridge. Traversing the downtown, it is also known as Andres Bonifacio Avenue from Mandulog Bridge over Mandulog River to Mariano Badelles Sr. Street and Roxas Avenue, which traverses the downtown, from thereon to Tubod Bridge over Iligan River.

Entering Linamon, it becomes alternatively known as the Linamon–Zamboanga Road. Following the province's coastline with Iligan Bay and Panguil Bay, it later traverses other costal towns such as Kauswagan, Bacolod, Maigo, Kolambugan, Tubod, and Baroy. It then veers away from the coast towards the towns of Lala and Kapatagan.

It soon enters Zamboanga del Sur as the Aurora–Tukuran segment of Lanao–Pagadian–Zamboanga City Road at the town of Aurora. At the Aurora Junction, it intersects with Ozamiz–Pagadian Road and turns south, alternatively as the Aurora–Tukuran Road. It then traverses the mountainous terrain and enters Tukuran, where it ends at a junction with Maharlika Highway, which continues the Lanao–Pagadian–Zamboanga City Road towards Zamboanga City.

- The southern-to-northern-to-western road called "Loo-na Highway" such as popular hit roads as Masterson Avenue (CDO-Airport-Bukidnon Road), PN Roa Avenue & more zig-zag shaped roads like Dipolog Winding Road, Casa Encatada and we arrived at the Dakak beach resort.

== History ==
During the American colonial era, the highway's section from Butuan to Iligan was part of Highway 1 in Mindanao, while the section from Butuan to Tukuran was part of Highway 7. By 2014, the highway was designated by the Department of Public Works and Highways as N9.

== Intersections ==
Intersections are numbered by kilometer post, with the Rizal Park in the city of Manila designated as kilometer 0.

Region	Province	City/Municipality	km	mi	Destinations	Notes
Caraga	Butuan				AH 26 (N1) (Surigao-Butuan National Highway)	Eastern terminus.
Caraga	Butuan				N951 (Mayor Democrito D. Plaza II Avenue)	
Caraga	Butuan				N952 (Butuan-Masao Road)	
Caraga	Butuan				N951 (Mayor Democrito D. Plaza II Avenue) / N954 (Airport Road) – Butuan Airport	Roundabout (Butuanon Chinese Friendship Gate)
Caraga	Agusan del Norte	Nasipit			N953 (Nasipit Port Road)	
Northern Mindanao	Misamis Oriental	Gingoog			N955 (Gingoog–Claveria–Villanueva Road / Guanzon Street)	Serves as a diversion road; provides access to Gingoog Port
Northern Mindanao	Misamis Oriental	Villanueva			N955 (Gingoog–Claveria–Villanueva Road)	Serves as a diversion road.
Northern Mindanao	Cagayan de Oro				AH 26 (N10) (Sayre Highway)	Crossing traffic is carried by Mayor Justiniano Borja Flyover
Northern Mindanao	Cagayan de Oro				N945 (Corrales Street Extension) / Corrales Street	
Northern Mindanao	Cagayan de Oro				N945 (Don Apolinario Velez Street) / N946 (Julio Pacana Street)	Crossing traffic is carried by Mayor Pablo Magtajas Flyover
Northern Mindanao	Cagayan de Oro				N945 (Carmen–Patag–Bulua Road)	
Northern Mindanao	Iligan				N956 (Quezon Avenue) / Quezon Avenue Extension	Provides access to Port of Iligan
Northern Mindanao	Iligan				N77 (Iligan–Marawi Road)	
Northern Mindanao	Lanao del Norte	Tubod			N957 (Tubod Wharf Road) / Tubod–Ganassi Road	
Zamboanga Peninsula	Zamboanga del Sur	Aurora			N78 (Ozamiz–Pagadian Road)	
Zamboanga Peninsula	Zamboanga del Sur	Tukuran			AH 26 (N1) (Maharlika Highway)	Western terminus.
1.000 mi = 1.609 km; 1.000 km = 0.621 mi
