= N9 highway =

Road in Mindanao, Philippines

Route 9

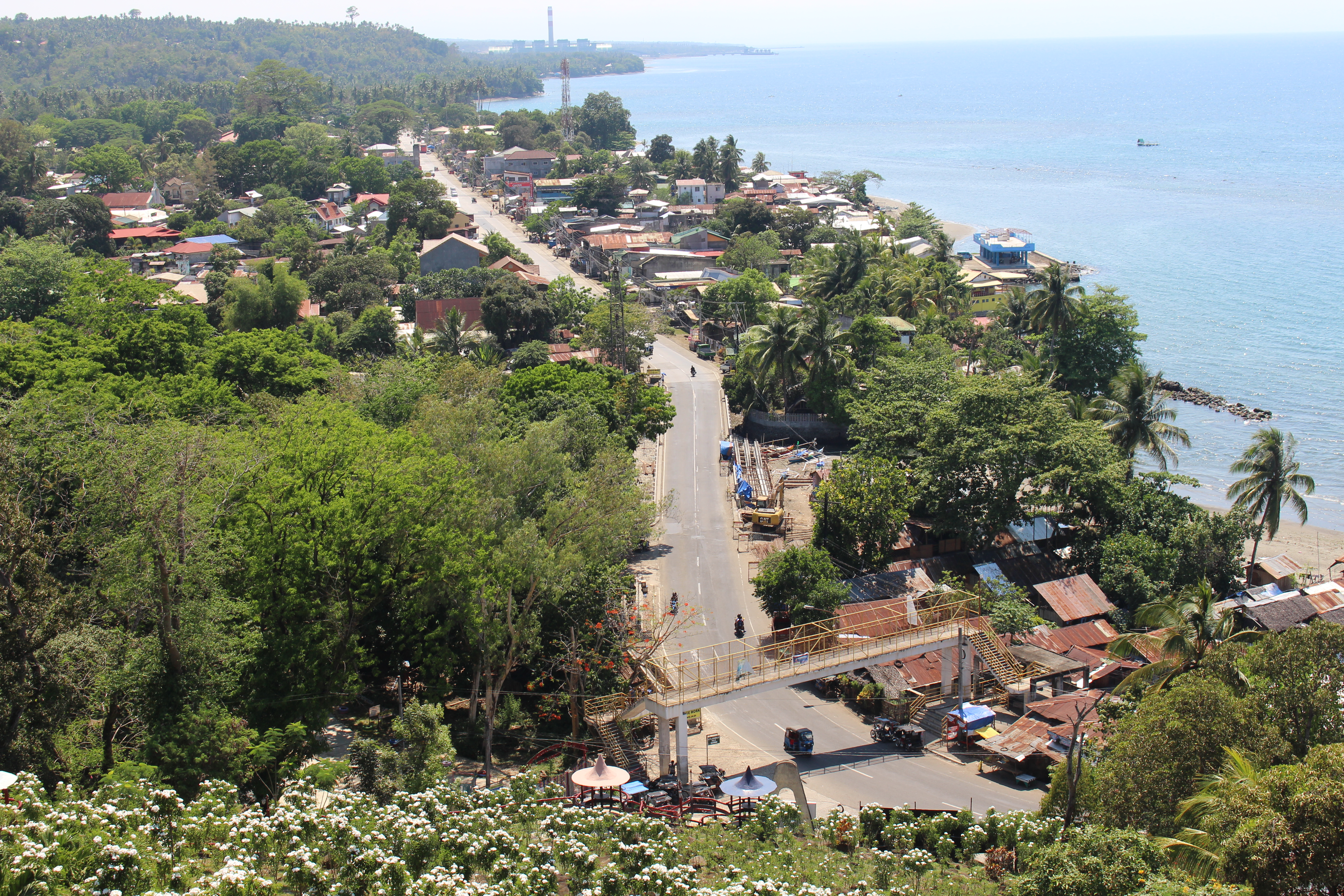
- Portion of the N9 Highway between Iligan and Linamon, Lanao del Norte

Route information
- Auxiliary route of AH 26 (26)
- Maintained by Department of Public Works and Highways
- Existed: 2015–present
- Component highways: N9

Major junctions
- East end: AH 26 (N1) (Surigao-Butuan National Highway) in Butuan
- N952 (Butuan–Masao Port Road) in Butuan; N951 (Mayor Democrito D. Plaza II Avenue) in Butuan; N951 (Mayor Democrito D. Plaza II Avenue) / N954 (Airport Road) in Butuan; N953 (Nasipit Port Road) in Nasipit; N955 (Gingoog–Claveria–Villanueva Road / Gingoog Wharf Road) in Gingoog; N955 (Gingoog–Claveria–Villanueva Road) in Villanueva, Misamis Oriental; AH 26 (N10) (Sayre Highway) in Cagayan de Oro; N862 (Cagayan de Oro Coastal Bypass Road) in Cagayan de Oro; N945 (Don A. Velez Street) / N946 (Cagayan de Oro Port Road) in Cagayan de Oro; N946 (Corrales Street Extension) in Cagayan de Oro; N945 (Carmen–Patag–Bulua Road) in Cagayan de Oro; N956 (Quezon Avenue) in Iligan; N956-1 (Highway Secondary Diversion Road) in Iligan; N77 (Misamis Oriental–Maria Cristina Boundary Road) in Iligan; N957 (Tubod Wharf Road) in Tubod, Lanao del Norte
- West end: N78 (Ozamiz–Pagadian Road) in Aurora, Zamboanga del Sur

Location
- Country: Philippines
- Provinces: Agusan del Norte, Misamis Oriental, Lanao del Norte, Zamboanga del Sur
- Major cities: Butuan, Gingoog, Cagayan de Oro, El Salvador, Iligan
- Towns: Buenavista, Nasipit, Carmen, Magsaysay, Medina, Talisayan, Balingoan, Kinoguitan, Sugbongcogon, Binuangan, Salay, Lagonglong, Balingasag, Jasaan, Tagoloan, Opol, Alubijid, Laguindingan, Gitagum, Libertad, Initao, Naawan, Manticao, Lugait, Linamon, Kauswagan, Bacolod, Maigo, Kolambugan, Tubod, Baroy, Lala, Kapatagan, Aurora

Highway system
- Roads in the Philippines; Highways; Expressways; List
← N8	→ N10

National Route 9 (N9) is a two to six major primary route network connecting the provinces of connecting the provinces of Agusan del Norte, Misamis Oriental, Lanao del Norte, and Zamboanga del Sur.

== Route description ==
The highway runs along the northern coast of Mindanao from Butuan, Agusan del Norte to Tukuran, Zamboanga del Sur. Its section from Balingoan, Misamis Oriental, the location of a ferry port to Camiguin, to Cagayan de Oro is part of the Central Nautical Highway of the Philippine Nautical Highway System. Its section from Alae Bridge 2 at Tagoloan–Cagayan de Oro boundary to Marcos Bridge, which crosses the Cagayan de Oro River, in Cagayan de Oro is part of the Mindanao spur of the Pan-Philippine Highway, although the signs that are on the kilometer markers are actually N10/AH26 signs, indicating that the latter route is on a concurrency with N9.

=== Caraga ===
==== Butuan City ====
National Route 9 starts in Ampayon, Butuan as Butuan–Cagayan de Oro–Iligan Road in a Y-junction stemmed from the Daang Maharlika. An 88-meter (96 yd) section of the latter refers a side of the triangle roundabout as part of N9. It is unknown if this is a mistake or not. The other side is named Butuan–Cagayan de Oro–Iligan Road. It passes through urban portions of the city and is the main highway for the city. It meets a Y-junction which stems a diversion road called Mayor Democrito D. Plaza II Avenue (N951). It enters a roundabout with the aforementioned highway and Bancasi Airport Road (N954).

==== Agusan del Norte ====
The road enters the province of Agusan del Norte and traverses through the towns of Buenavista, the industrial Nasipit and Carmen. The region ends in the Carmen-Magsaysay border.

=== Northern Mindanao ===
==== Misamis Oriental ====
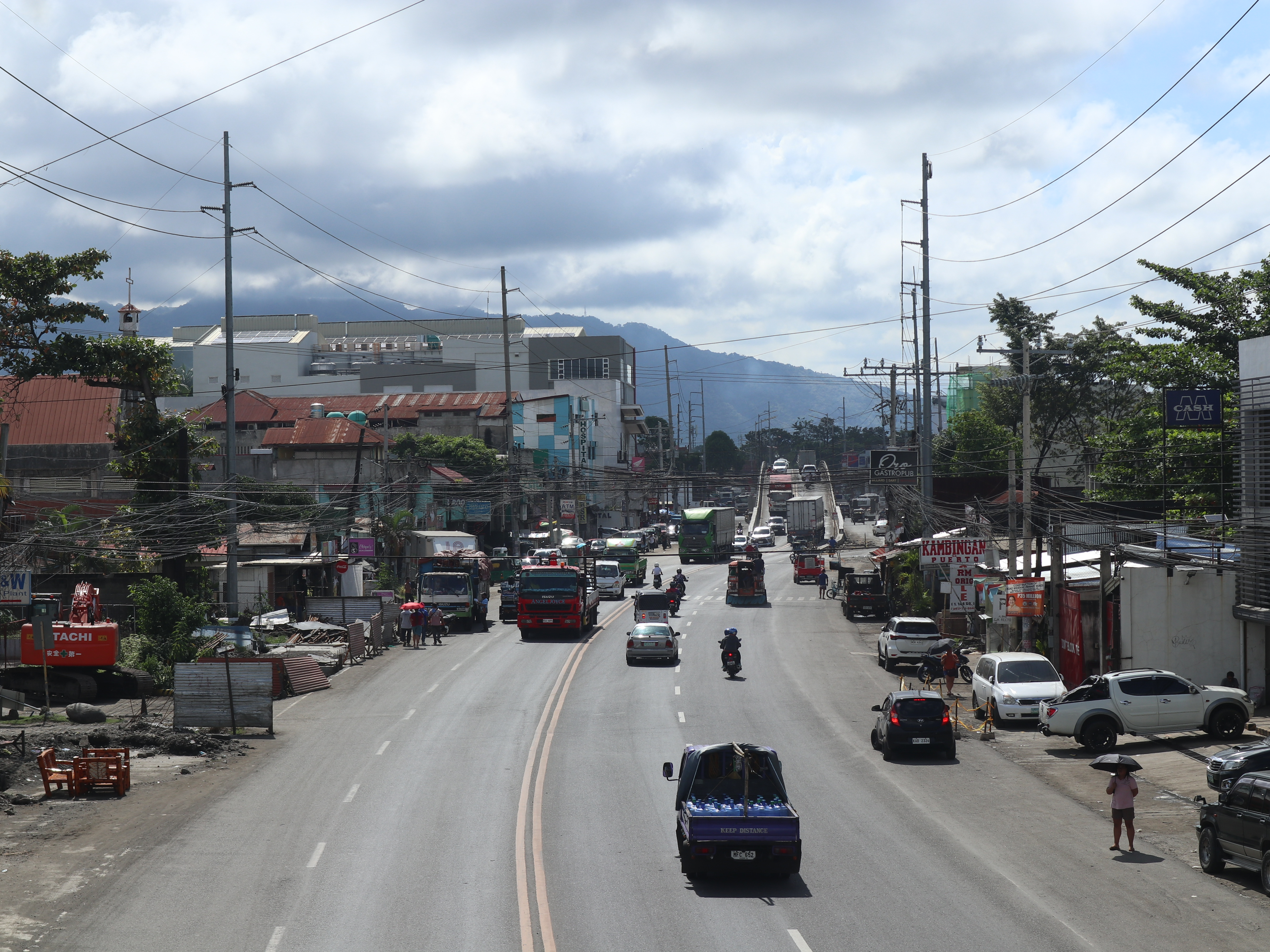
N9 as Claro M. Recto Avenue in Cagayan de Oro.

N9 and its assigned highway reaches the municipality of Magsaysay and reaches a sharp turn where the direction goes south. It is a road with many turns. After reaching Gingoog, the road is met with the Gingoog–Claveria–Villanueva Road, a diversion that ignores most of the towns in the eastern side of the province. After traversing through many municipalities, it is met again with the western end of the aforementioned road. Upon reaching the city of Cagayan de Oro, it reunites with the Asian Highway 26, albeit it is a spur route. It also reaches the junction of a coastal highway that ends in Opol instead of the eponymous town. It also gives access to the port road (N946) and two other streets designated as N945. It traverses to the industrial areas of Opol and El Salvador. It passes through multiple more towns including Laguindingan, which is the location of a non-national airport road. Upon reaching Gitagum, a road to the sharp left turn is actually the true route of the Butuan–Cagayan de Oro–Iligan Road because it gives access to its municipal hall and a part of the poblacion, the former road is actually a diversion road. After more towns have been passed, N9 reaches the Misamis Oriental-Iligan border, thus ending the Butuan–Cagayan de Oro–Iligan Road.

==== Iligan City ====
N9 starts in Iligan as Misamis Oriental–Maria Cristina Boundary Road. Upon reaching the urban area of the city, it is met with a diversion road (N956-1) that ends near the N77 junction. Once it enters the area containing Overton, the route changes to N77 where it goes left while N9's physical continuation is the Overton–Buru-un Road. This section ends in the border with Iligan and Linamon.

==== Lanao del Norte ====
The Lanao del Norte portion of the road is entirely the Linamon–Zamboanga Road. It enters multiple towns including the provincial capital Tubod, which is home to a port road (N957) and Panguil Bay Bridge, which connects Tangub and significantly cuts travel time between Misamis Occidental and the aforementioned province.

==== Zamboanga del Sur ====
The road enters Zamboanga del Sur at Aurora. Upon reaching the roundabout in the Aurora town proper, the road terminates at the Aurora–Tukuran Road and Aurora–Ozamiz City Road. The N9 designation resumes 538.4 meters (1,766 ft) away as the Junction Aurora–Monte Alegre Road, which eventually reaches its terminus at the intersection with the Ozamiz–Pagadian Road (N78) in Barangay Monte Alegre, also in Aurora.

== History ==
During the American colonial era, N9's section from Butuan to Iligan was part of Highway 1 in Mindanao, while the section from Butuan to Tukuran was part of Highway 7. By 2014, these highways were designated by the Department of Public Works and Highways as N9.

In the mid-2020s, Aurora–Tukuran Road, which runs between the Aurora town proper and the Pan-Philippine Highway in Tukuran—both located in Zamboanga del Sur—was removed from N9 and downgraded to a tertiary national road. Concurrently, the Junction Aurora–Monte Alegre Road in Aurora was incorporated into N9. This realignment effectively shifted the western terminus of N9 from Tukuran to Aurora.

== Intersections ==
Intersections are numbered by kilometer post, with the Rizal Park in the city of Manila designated as kilometer 0.

Province	City/Municipality	km	mi	Destinations	Notes
Butuan		1,232	766	AH 26 (N1) (Surigao–Butuan Highway/Daang Maharlika) / N9	Eastern terminus. An 88-meter (96 yd) portion of the Y-junction is labeled as N9
Butuan		1,235	767	N951 (Mayor Democrito D. Plaza II Avenue)	
Butuan		1,240	770	N952 (Butuan-Masao Road)	
Butuan		1,246	774	N951 (Mayor Democrito D. Plaza II Avenue) / N954 (Airport Road) – Butuan Airport	Roundabout (Butuanon Chinese Friendship Gate)
Agusan del Norte	Buenavista	1,255	780	Buenavista–Bunaguit Road	
Agusan del Norte	Buenavista	1,257	781	Agusan–Bukidnon Road	
Agusan del Norte	Nasipit	1,262	784	N953 (Nasipit Port Road)	
Misamis Oriental	Gingoog	1,315	817	N955 (Gingoog–Claveria–Villanueva Road / Guanzon Street)	Serves as a diversion road; access to Gingoog Port
Misamis Oriental	Medina	1,328	825	Medina Bypass Road	
Misamis Oriental	Talisayan	1,349	838	Talisayan Bypass Road	
Misamis Oriental	Kinoguitan	1,360	850	Kinoguitan Bypass Road	
Misamis Oriental	Salay	1,378	856	Looc–Salay Bypass Road	
Misamis Oriental	Lagonglong	1,380	860	Dampil–Lagonglong Bypass Road	
Misamis Oriental	Lagonglong	1,382	859	Lagonlong Bypass Road	
Misamis Oriental	Balingasag	1,389	863	Balingasag Bypass Road	
Misamis Oriental	Balingoan	1,351	839	East end of Central Nautical Highway concurrency.	
Misamis Oriental	Jasaan	1,405	873	Jasaan Bypass Road	
Misamis Oriental	Jasaan	1,407	874	Kimay–Solana Bypass Road	
Misamis Oriental	Villanueva	1,414	879	N955 (Gingoog–Claveria–Villanueva Road)	Serves as a diversion road.
Misamis Oriental	Tagoloan	1,420	880	Tagoloan Bypass Road	
Misamis Oriental	Tagoloan–Cagayan de Oro boundary	1,423.552	884.554	Alae Bridge 2. East end of AH26 concurrency.	
Cagayan de Oro		1,425	885	AH 26 (N10) (Sayre Highway)	Crossing traffic is carried by Mayor Justiniano Borja Flyover
Cagayan de Oro		1,431	889	Cugman Bypass Road	
Cagayan de Oro		1,433	890	N862 (Cagayan de Oro Coastal Bypass Road)	Road was converted to secondary road in 2023 and is currently numbered N862.
Cagayan de Oro		1,437	893	Lieutenant Vicente Alagar Street	Serves Camp Alagar
Cagayan de Oro		1,437	893	N946 (Corrales Street Extension) / Corrales Street	
Cagayan de Oro		1,437	893	N945 (Don Apolinario Velez Street) / N946 (Julio Pacana Street)	Crossing traffic is carried by Mayor Pablo Magtajas Flyover. West end of the Central Nautical Highway concurrency.
Cagayan de Oro		1,438.789	894.022	Marcos Bridge over Cagayan de Oro River. West end of AH26 concurrency.	
Cagayan de Oro		1,441	895	N945 (Carmen–Patag–Bulua Road)	
Misamis Oriental	Opol	1,445	898	N862 (Cagayan de Oro Coastal Bypass Road)	
Misamis Oriental	El Salvador	1,451	902	Amoros–Taytay Bypass Road	
Misamis Oriental	Alubijid	1,460	910	Loguilo–Alubijid Bypass Road	
Misamis Oriental	Alubijid	1,462	908	Alubijid Bypass Road	
Misamis Oriental	Gitagum	1,470	910	Gitagum Bypass Road	
Misamis Oriental	Manticao	1,499	931	Manticao Bypass Road	
Misamis Oriental–Lanao del Norte boundary	Lugait–Iligan boundary	1,511	939	End of Butuan–Cagayan de Oro–Iligan Road; start of Misamis Oriental–Maria Cristina Road	
Iligan		1,518	943	Santa Filomena–Bonbonon–Digikilangan–Rogongon Road – Talakag	Access to Talakag
Iligan		1,520	940	N956-1 (Highway Secondary Diversion Road)	
Iligan		1,525	948	N956 (Quezon Avenue) / Quezon Avenue Extension	Access to Port of Iligan
Iligan		1,529	950	N956-1 (Iligan City Diversion Road)	
Iligan		1,531	951	N77 (Iligan–Marawi Road)	N9 continues as Overton–Buru-un Road.
Lanao del Norte	Linamon	1,537	955	Balo-i–Matungao–Linamon Road – Matungao, Balo-i	
Lanao del Norte	Kauswagan	1,544	959	Kauswagan–Munai Road	
Lanao del Norte	Bacolod	1,555	966	Bacolod–Madalum Highway	
Lanao del Norte	Tubod	1,588	987	N957 (Tubod Wharf Road) / Tubod–Ganassi Road	
Lanao del Norte	Lala	1,602	995	Lala–Salvador–Tubod Road	
Lanao del Norte	Kapatagan	1,608	999	Dobleston–Butadon Road – Sultan Naga Dimaporo	Access to Sultan Naga Dimaporo
Zamboanga del Sur	Aurora			Aurora–Tukuran Road / Aurora–Ozamiz City Road	Western terminus of initial section
Zamboanga del Sur	Aurora			Aurora–Ozamiz City Road	Eastern terminus of Junction Aurora–Monte Alegre Road. N9 resumes.
Zamboanga del Sur	Aurora			N78 (Ozamiz–Pagadian Road)	Western terminus of N9
1.000 mi = 1.609 km; 1.000 km = 0.621 mi: Concurrency terminus; Route transition
