= Misamis Oriental–Maria Cristina Boundary Road =

Road in Iligan, Philippines

Misamis Oriental–Maria Cristina Boundary Road

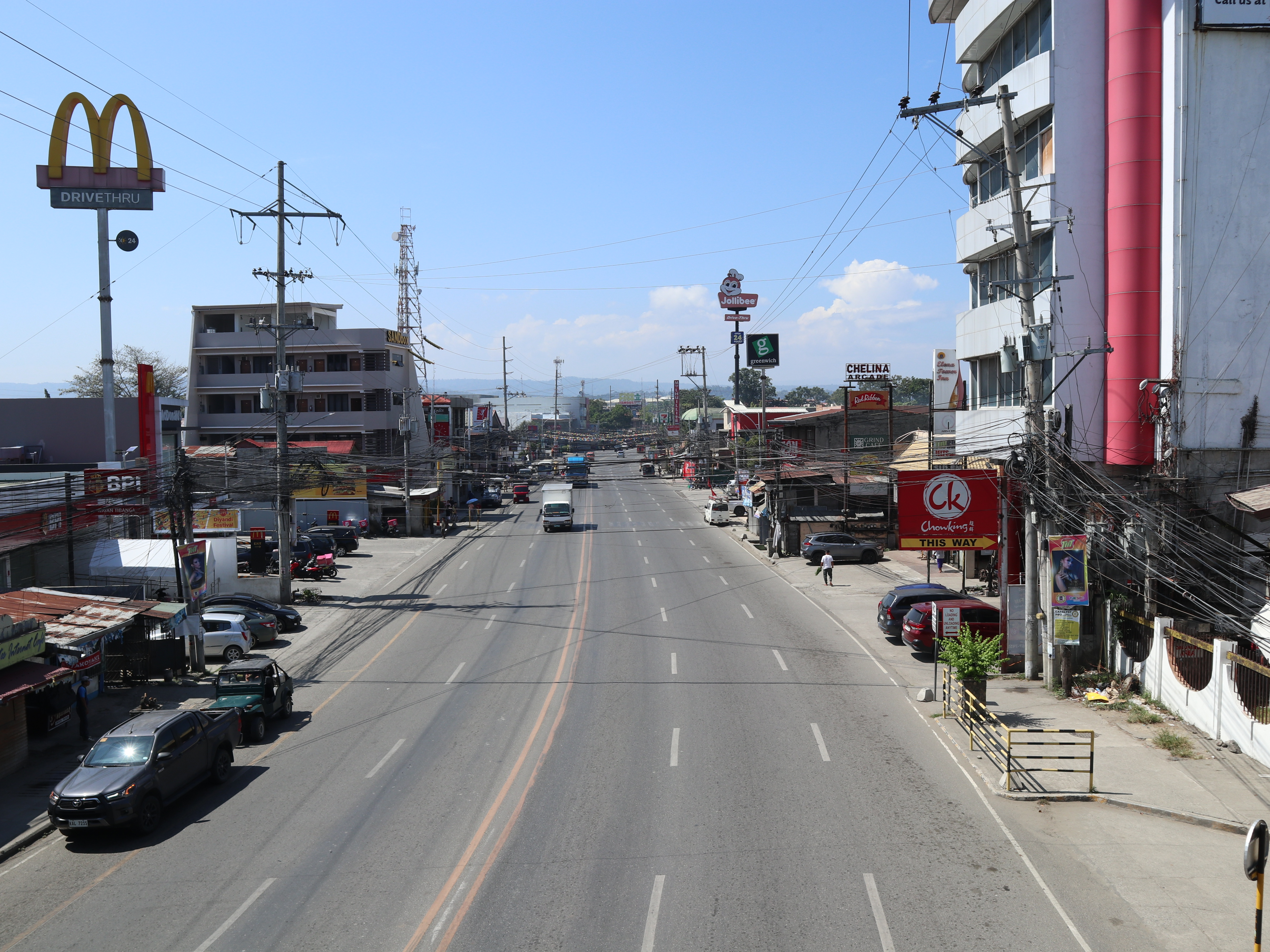
- The road as Andres Bonifacio Avenue in Iligan

Route information
- Maintained by Department of Public Works and Highways (DPWH)
- Component highways: N9 from Misamis Oriental-Iligan Boundary; N77 from N77 junction to Balo-i Boundary

Major junctions
- North end: N9 (Butuan–Cagayan de Oro–Iligan Road) in Misamis Oriental-Iligan Boundary
- N956 (Iligan Wharf Road) in Iligan; N9 (Overton–Buru-un Boundary Road) in Iligan
- South end: N77 (Iligan–Marawi Road) in Iligan-Balo-i Boundary

Location
- Country: Philippines
- Major cities: Iligan

Highway system
- Roads in the Philippines; Highways; Expressways; List

Misamis Oriental–Maria Cristina Boundary Road is a 22-kilometer (14 mi), primary road in Iligan. It is a component of National Route 9 (N9) and National Route 77 (N77).

== Route description ==
=== Misamis Oriental Boundary ===
The road starts after the boundary between Iligan and Lugait. It starts as N9 after the end of Butuan–Cagayan de Oro–Iligan Road.

=== Overton to Iligan-Balo-i ===
N9 transfers to Overton–Buru-un Road. The road’s route continues as N77. The road ends in the boundary of Iligan and Balo-i and is now called Iligan–Marawi Road (N77).
