= Northeastern Misamis General Hospital =

Government hospital in Misamis Oriental, Philippines

Geography
- Location: Villanueva, Misamis Oriental, Northern Mindanao, Philippines

History
- Opened: April 12, 2024

The Northeastern Misamis General Hospital (NMGH) is a government hospital in the Philippines. It is located in Barangay Looc, Villanueva, Misamis Oriental.

It was inaugurated on April 12, 2024.
