= N77 =

N77 may refer to:

- HMS Tetrarch (N77), a submarine of the Royal Navy
- N77 highway, in the Philippines
- N77 road (Ireland)
- Ngalakgan language
- Nokia N77, a mobile phone
