= Gingoog–Claveria–Villanueva Road =

Road in the Philippines

Gingoog–Claveria–Villanueva Road

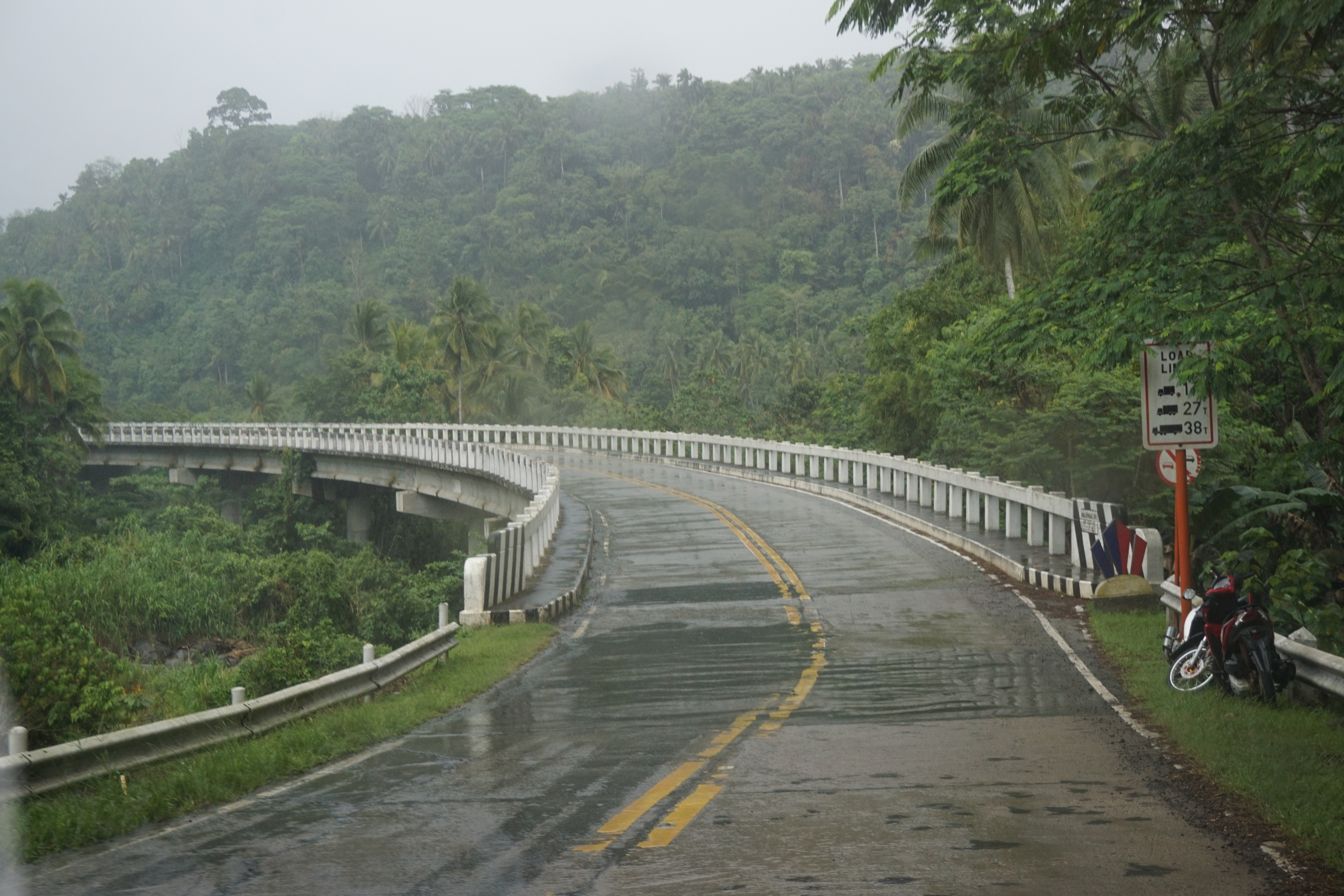
- Macapagal Bridge in Gingoog

Route information
- Length: 70.908 km (44.060 mi)
- Component highways: N955

Major junctions
- West end: N9 (Butuan–Cagayan de Oro–Iligan Road) in Villanueva
- East end: N9 (Butuan–Cagayan de Oro–Iligan Road) / N955 (Guanzon Street / Gingoog-Wharf Road) in Gingoog

Location
- Country: Philippines
- Provinces: Misamis Oriental
- Major cities: Gingoog
- Towns: Villanueva, Claveria

Highway system
- Roads in the Philippines; Highways; Expressways; List
← N954	→ N956

The Gingoog–Claveria–Villanueva Road is a 70.9-kilometer (44.1 mi), two-to-four lane national secondary highway, connecting the municipalities of Villanueva and Claveria, and the city of Gingoog in Misamis Oriental. Traversing through the mountain range that includes Mount Balatukan, it serves as a diversion road from the Butuan–Cagayan de Oro–Iligan Road.

The entire highway is designated as National Route 955 (N955) of the Philippine highway network. In Gingoog, it is locally known as J.Z. Mercado Avenue.
