= Macapagal Bridge =

Macapagal Bridge Tulay ng Macapagal
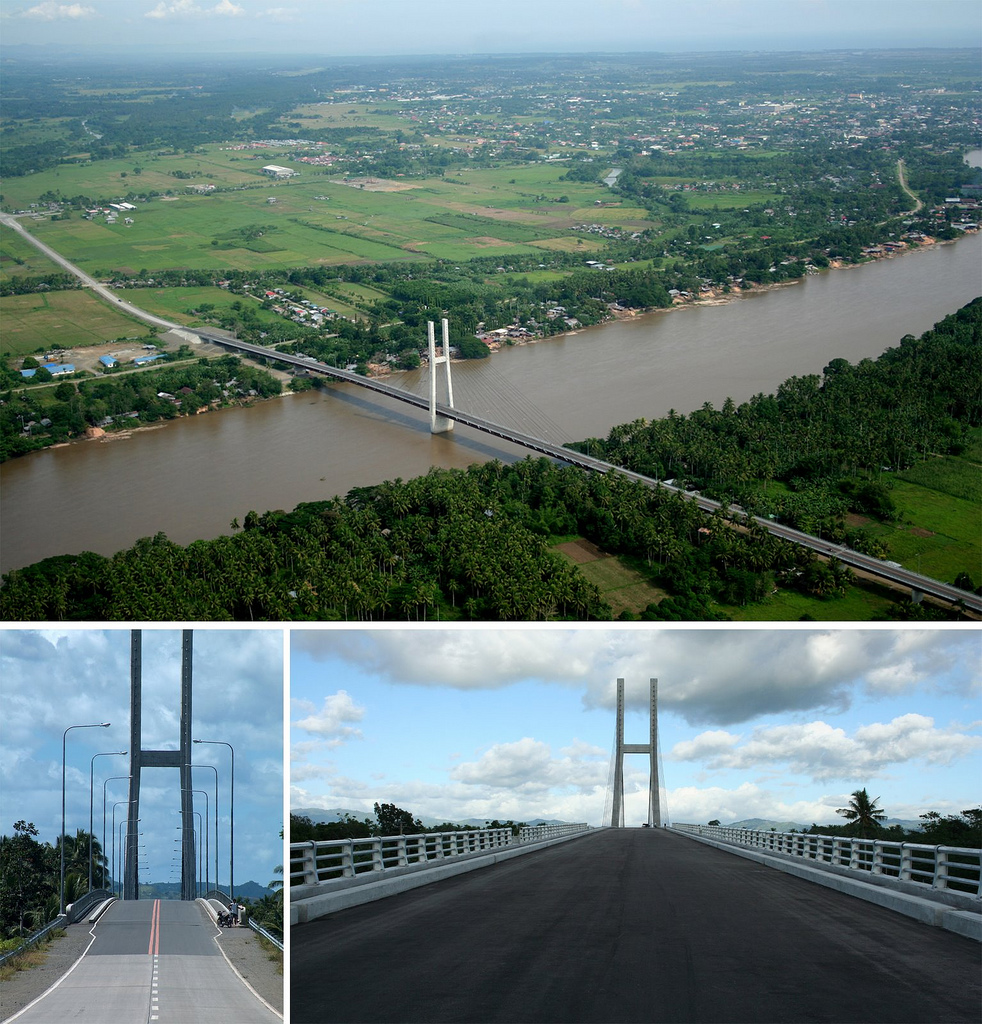
- Aerial and ground views of the bridge
- Coordinates: 8°55′21″N 125°33′13″E
- Carries: 2 lanes of N951 (Mayor Democrito D. Plaza II Avenue / Butuan Bypass Road); Pedestrians and vehicles
- Crosses: Agusan River
- Locale: Butuan, Agusan del Norte
- Official name: President Diosdado Macapagal Bridge
- Other name: Second Magsaysay Bridge
- Named for: Diosdado Macapagal
- Maintained by: Department of Public Works and Highways

Characteristics
- Design: Steel cable-stayed bridge
- Total length: 908 m (2,979 ft)
- Longest span: 360 m (1,180 ft)
- No. of lanes: Two-lane single carriageway

History
- Constructed by: Nippon Steel Corporation and TOA Corporation (Joint Venture)
- Construction start: May 6, 2004
- Construction end: May 2007
- Construction cost: ₱2.2 billion
- Inaugurated: May 3, 2007

Location
- Interactive map of Macapagal Bridge

The Macapagal Bridge (Filipino: Tulay ng Macapagal) is a steel cable-stayed bridge along Mayor Democrito D. Plaza II Avenue (also known as the Butuan Bypass Road) in Butuan that crosses the Agusan River. It has a length of 908 m (2,979 ft), making it the second-longest bridge in Mindanao after the Panguil Bay Bridge, and the third-longest cable-stayed bridge in the Philippines after the Marcelo Fernan Bridge and Cebu–Cordova Bridge.

Initially named as the "Second Magsaysay Bridge" during construction (referring to the nearby Magsaysay Bridge), the bridge was officially named after President Diosdado Macapagal when it was inaugurated in 2007. The bridge was constructed along with the 13.1 km (8.1 mi) Butuan Bypass Road, which aims to decongest traffic along the Agusan-Misamis Oriental Road in downtown Butuan, through official development assistance from the Japan Bank for International Cooperation worth ₱2.2 billion.

== Background ==
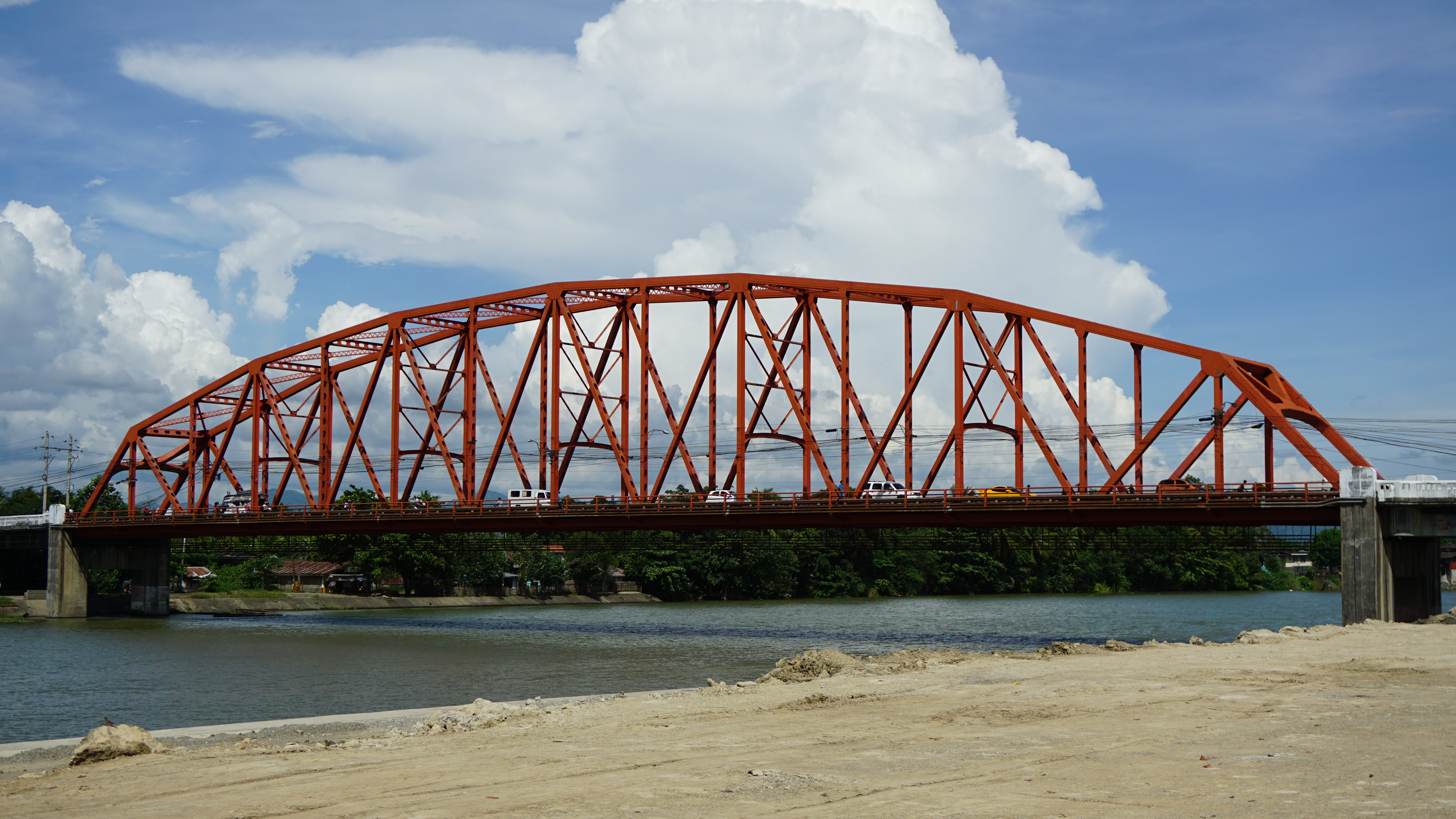
The old Magsaysay Bridge, built in 1957, was the only bridge spanning the Agusan River in Butuan before Macapagal Bridge was completed.

Before the construction of the bridge, the nearby Magsaysay Bridge was the only bridge in Butuan that spans the Agusan River. Built in 1957, the old truss bridge has deteriorated over time and has experienced heavy traffic congestion because of the increasing vehicular volume in the city, thus necessitating the construction of a new bridge.

Since the administration of Philippine President Fidel Ramos, there have been plans developed by the City Council for a bypass road and bridge that would alleviate the traffic problem along Magsaysay Bridge. During the administration of Philippine President Joseph Estrada, the development of a bypass road and bridge was included in his Mindanao 2000 Development Plan, which was part of his administration's effort to develop transportation infrastructure within the island.

In August 2000, the Japan Bank for International Cooperation included the Second Magsaysay Bridge and the Butuan Bypass Road in its Special Yen (ODA) Loan Scheme worth JP¥ 34,723 million, along with the New Iloilo Airport Development Project and the Subic Bay Port Development Project. Of this loaned amount, JP¥ 3,549 million was allocated for the project. However, after President Estrada was removed from office during the Second EDSA Revolution, implementation of the project fell upon the newly installed administration of President Gloria Macapagal Arroyo.

== Construction ==
The Macapagal Bridge, along with the Butuan Bypass Road, was constructed by a joint venture of Japanese engineering firms Nippon Steel Corporation and TOA Corporation, who were selected as main contractors after the loan agreement was signed. TOA Corporation was responsible for constructing the single main pylon made of reinforced concrete, the foundations to support the bridge superstructure, and all civil works for the road section. A joint venture of Japanese firms Katahira and Engineers International and Sogo Engineering, Inc. and Filipino companies Proconsult, Inc., TCGI Engineers and DCCD Engineering provided the detailed engineering design and construction supervision for the project, including the preparation of conceptual and preliminary designs, detailed design, contract drawings, technical specification, cost estimates, and bid documents.

During the design phase of the project, the length of the main span was increased from 255 m (837 ft) to 360 m (1,180 ft) to prevent falling debris from clashing with the bridge piers in the event of heavy rains. This resulted in the reduction of the length of the approach bridge from 630 m (2,070 ft) to 548 m (1,798 ft), while the total length of the bridge was increased from 885 m (2,904 ft) to 908 m (2,979 ft) because abutments had to be built in a location away from the Agusan River to avoid the soft ground.

Construction of the Macapagal Bridge and the Butuan Bypass Road was expected to last 70 months from the signing of the loan agreement in August 2000 up to the expected completion of civil works by May 2006. However, the actual construction took 82 months because of delays due to administrative procedures, delayed payment of billings for the contractors, flooding of the Agusan River due to inclement weather, delays in land acquisition and soft ground encountered near the bridge abutment, which required additional sub-surface investigations and design revisions. Civil works for both the bridge and the bypass road began in May 2004 and were completed in May 2007.

== Opening ==
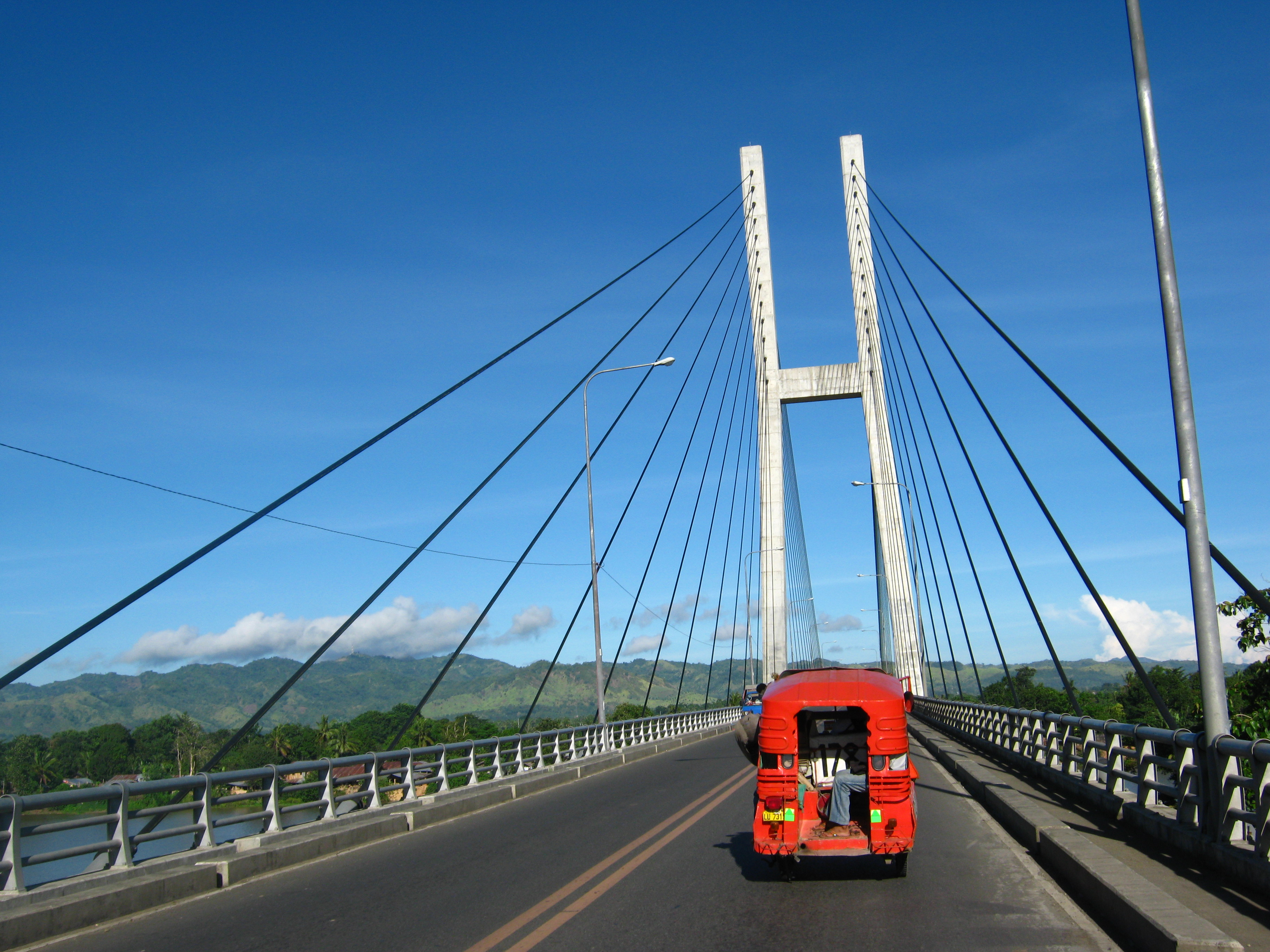
The opening of Macapagal Bridge helped ease traffic congestion in Butuan and made transportation within the Caraga Region faster and more efficient.

Macapagal Bridge was completed and opened to traffic on the second week of April 2007. Almost a month after, on May 3, 2007, the bridge was formally inaugurated during a ceremony led by Department of Public Works and Highways (DPWH) Secretary Manuel Bonoan, who represented President Arroyo. Also present during the inauguration are Akiri Sugiyama, economic minister of the Embassy of Japan in Manila, who represented Japanese Ambassador to the Philippines Ryuchiro Yamazaki; DPWH Assistant Secretary Rafael Yabut; Mindanao Economic Development Council Assistant Secretary Jose Aquino II; Japan Bank for International Cooperation (JBIC) chief representative Hiroshi Togo; Agusan del Norte First District Representative Leovigildo Banaag; and Japanese engineers from TOA Corporation, Nippon Steel Corporation and Katahira International.

The bridge, which was initially named "Second Magsaysay Bridge" during construction after the nearby Magsaysay Bridge 3 km (1.9 mi) to the north, was officially named President Diosdado Macapagal Bridge more than three years after its inauguration, after President Arroyo signed Republic Act No. 10051 on March 19, 2010. It's the third bridge named after former Philippine President Diosdado Macapagal after Macapagal Bridge in Cagayan de Oro and Macapagal Bridge in Marikina, Metro Manila.

== Later history ==
=== Economic benefits ===
The Butuan Bypass Road which the bridge carries across the Agusan River was completed in 2011 and opened to vehicular traffic the following year. The road connects the Bancasi Airport along the Butuan-Cagayan de Oro-Iligan Road with the Surigao-Agusan-Davao Road and bypassing downtown Butuan, thus easing traffic congestion in the city, and in the Magsaysay Bridge, which has banned vehicles over 15 tons from passing over the bridge since 2008 due to its old age. With the opening of the Macapagal Bridge, travel time between Libertad and Tiniwisan districts of the city was reduced to 13 minutes. Traffic congestion along Magsaysay Bridge also eased, reducing travel time from 30 minutes to just 16.5 minutes after Macapagal Bridge opened. Overall, transportation of goods between Caraga Region and other regions in Mindanao became more efficient, resulting in an increase in residential and commercial development in areas along the bypass road and an increase in investments and employment opportunities in the city.

=== Maintenance ===
The District Engineering Office (DEO) of Butuan under DPWH Region XIII was supposed to be in charge of operation and maintenance (O&M) for both the Macapagal Bridge and the Butuan Bypass Road. However, the responsibility for O&M was not delegated from DPWH Project Management Office - Philippine Japan Highway Loan (PMO-PJHL) to the DEO for six years after project completion. While no entity had the formal responsibility for O&M of the project, the DEO voluntarily conducted O&M to the extent possible. With the Butuan Bypass Road converted into a national road by virtue of Department Order No. 51 in May 2013, responsibility for O&M of the bridge and bypass road formally delegated to the DEO.

The bridge had its first major rehabilitation in April 2010 after it was discovered in their routine inspection that the foundation of the bridge had been sinking deeper into the Agusan River due to the softening of the soils and rocks where the abutment was built. They feared that the bridge might sink deeper and eventually collapse if no rehabilitation works are immediately done. The rehabilitation work lasted 10 months, thereby forcing the City Council to order temporary closure of the bridge to traffic and rerouting of traffic to the old Magsaysay Bridge.

=== Accidents and incidents ===
- On July 14, 2009, local police arrested 32-year-old Arthur, a resident of the city, for stealing electrical wires from the bridge's lighting system. Recovered from the suspect were 8 mm and 30 mm electrical wires measuring more than 50 meters long and estimated to cost more or less PH₱50,000. The suspect was charged with violating Republic Act 7832 or Theft of Electrical Power Transmission Link and Materials Act.
- On February 18, 2012, local search and rescue units rescued AJ Pangandaman, the son of Transportation and Communications Caraga Regional Director Alim Pangandaman, after jumping from the bridge following a misunderstanding with his girlfriend. Pangandaman jumped at around 5 a.m. and was found lying on a bamboo raft a few meters downstream from the bridge.

== See also ==
- List of bridges in the Philippines
- Mayor Democrito D. Plaza II Avenue
