= Mayor Democrito D. Plaza II Avenue =

Road in the Philippines

Mayor Democrito D. Plaza II Avenue
- Butuan Bypass Road
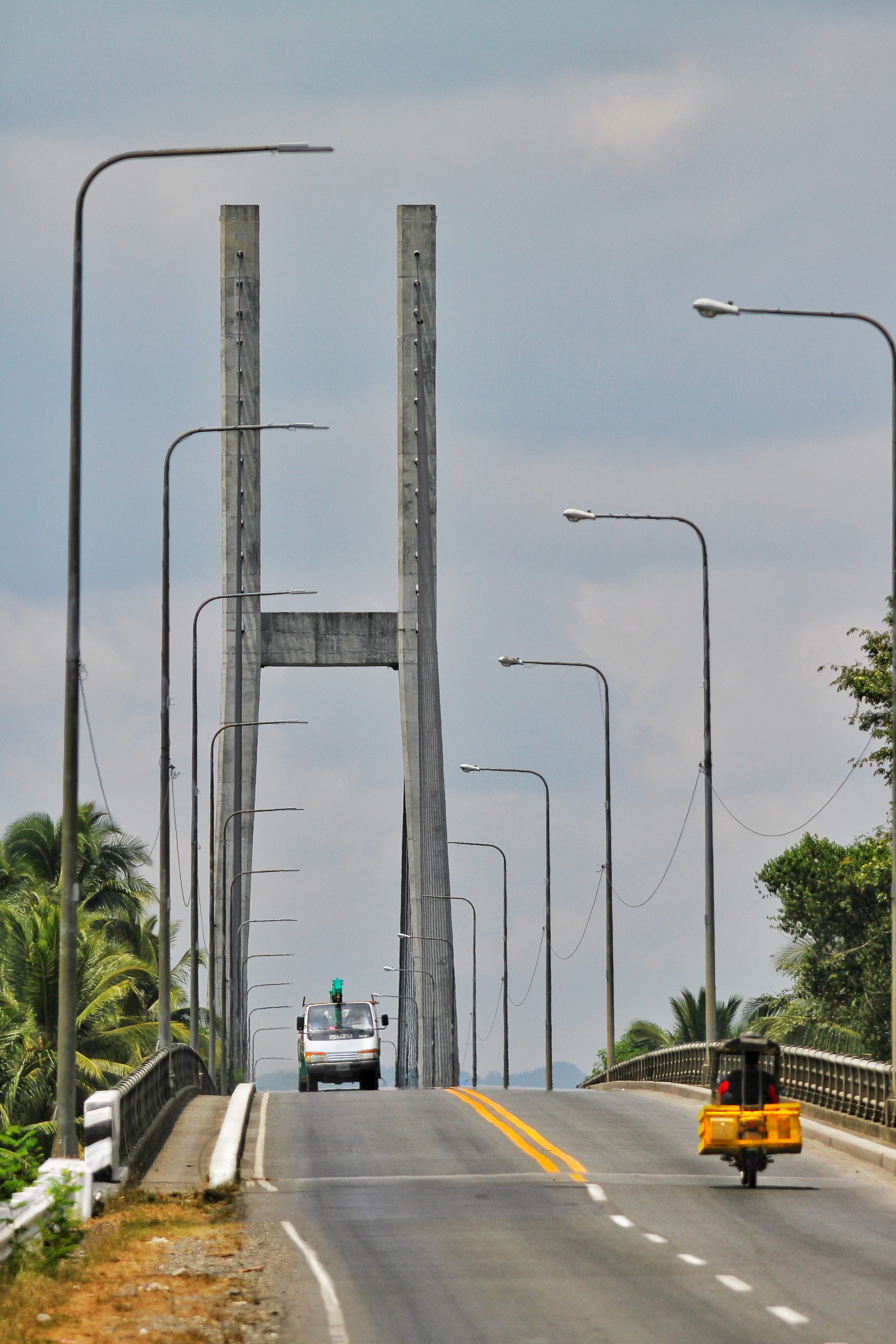
- Macapagal Bridge

Route information
- Length: 15.5 km (9.6 mi)
- Component highways: N951

Major junctions
- West end: N9 (Butuan–Cagayan de Oro–Iligan Road) at Bancasi
- East end: N9 (Butuan–Cagayan de Oro–Iligan Road) at Tiniwisan

Location
- Country: Philippines
- Major cities: Butuan

Highway system
- Roads in the Philippines; Highways; Expressways; List
← N947	→ N952

Mayor Democrito D. Plaza II Avenue (also known as the Butuan Bypass Road) is a 15.5-kilometre (9.6 mi), two-to-four lane national secondary highway in Butuan. It serves as a diversion road from the Butuan–Cagayan de Oro–Iligan Road.

This highway is designated as National Route 951 (N951) of the Philippine highway network.

This 15.5-kilometre highway was constructed along with the Macapagal Bridge which aims to decongest traffic along the Agusan-Misamis Oriental Road in downtown Butuan.

It was named after Democrito "Boy Daku" D. Plaza II, a former Barangay Captain from Baan, and city mayor of Butuan from 1992 to 2001 and 2004–2010.

== Gallery ==
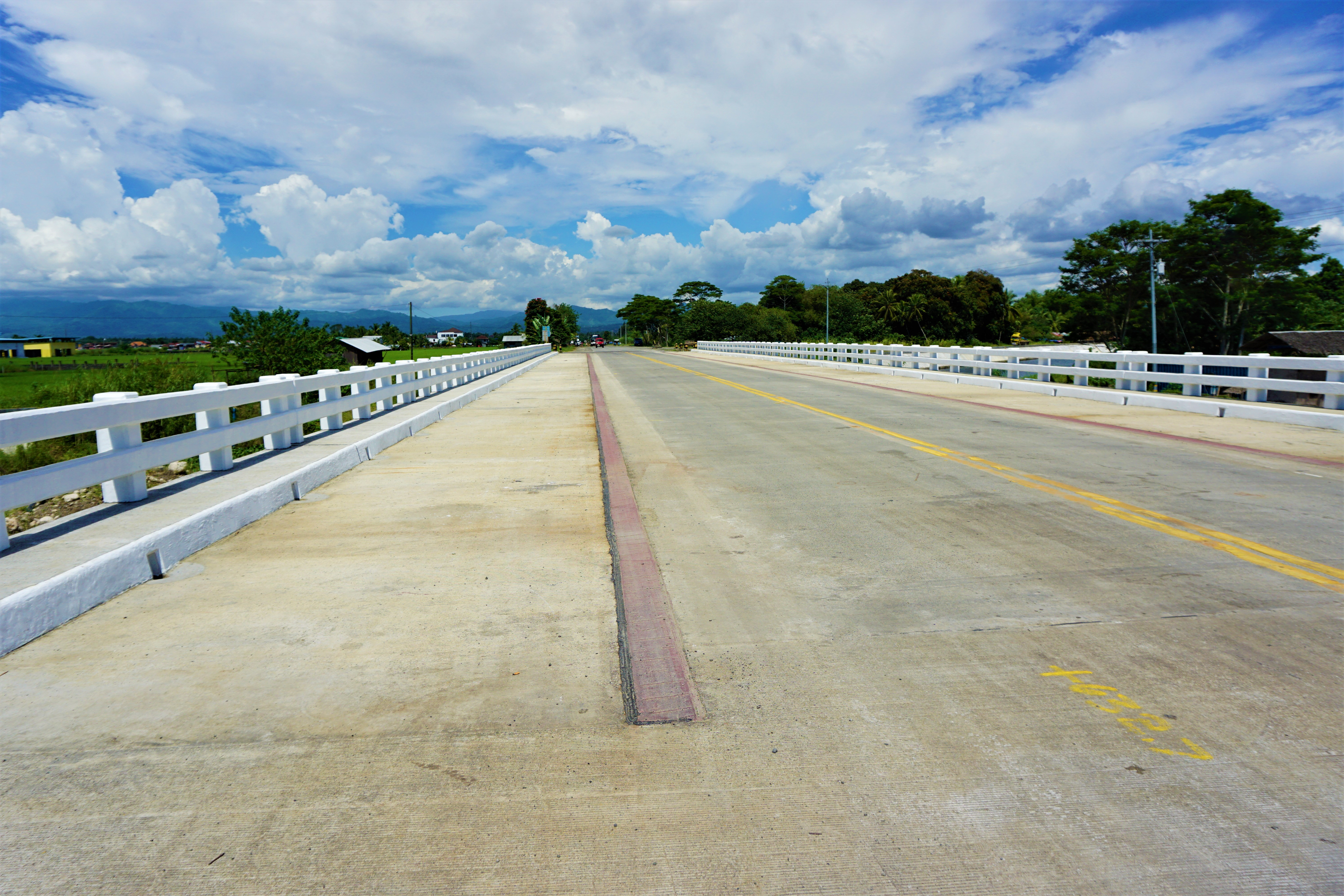
Mandacpan Bridge

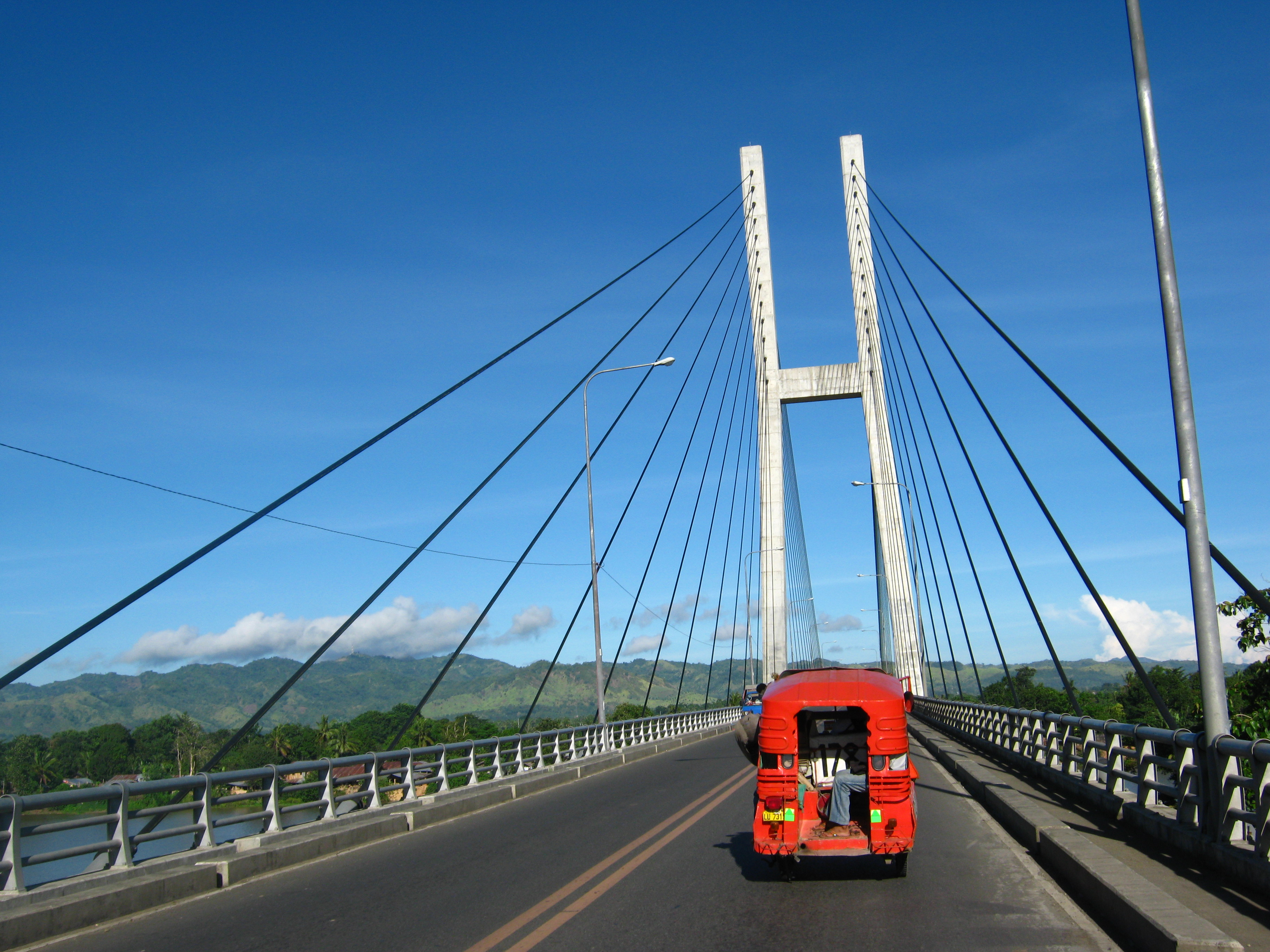
Macapagal Bridge

== See also ==
- Macapagal Bridge
