= Iligan–Marawi Road =

National primary road in the Philippines

Iligan–Marawi Road
- Malabang–Marawi–Iligan Road
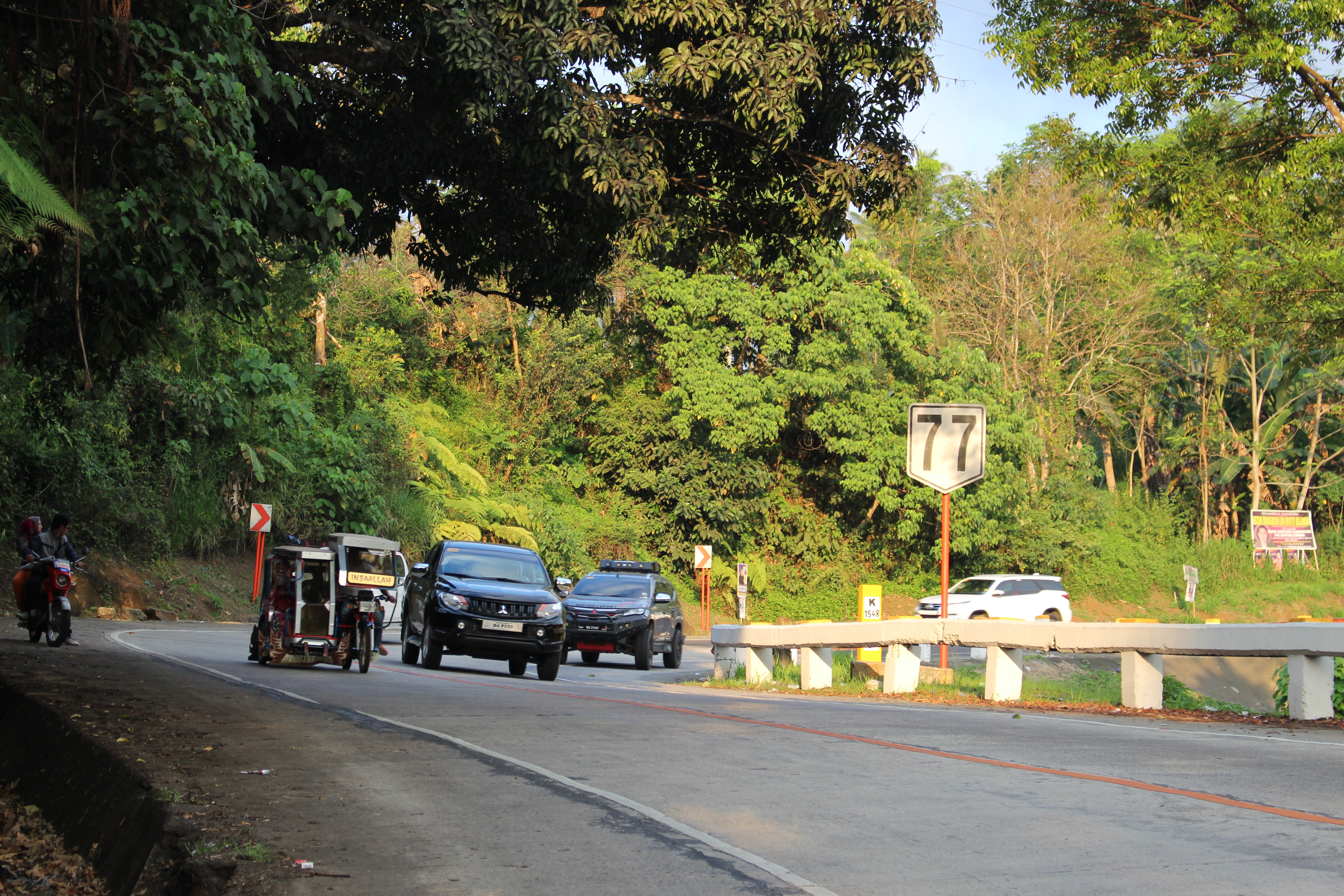
- Reassurance Marker at Balo-i, Lanao del Norte

Route information
- Maintained by Department of Public Works and Highways
- Length: 30 km (19 mi)
- Component highways: N77

Major junctions
- South end: AH 26 (N1) (Maharlika Highway) in Malabang, Lanao del Sur
- North end: N9 (Butuan–Cagayan de Oro–Iligan Road) in Iligan

Location
- Country: Philippines
- Provinces: Lanao del Norte, Lanao del Sur
- Major cities: Marawi, Iligan
- Towns: Saguiaran, Pantar, Balo-i

Highway system
- Roads in the Philippines; Highways; Expressways; List
← N76	→ N78

The Iligan–Marawi Road, officially the Malabang–Marawi–Iligan Road, is a 30-kilometer (19 mi), two-lane national primary road that connects the city of Iligan in Lanao del Sur to the municipality of Malabang in Lanao del Norte. It traverses through the cities and municipalities of Lanao del Sur and Lanao del Norte.

The highway is designated as National Route 77 (N77) of the Philippine highway network. It comprises Narciso Ramos Highway (Malabang-Marawi), Amai Pakpak Avenue (Marawi), Iligan-Marawi Road proper (Marawi-Iligan).
