= N77 highway =

Road in the Philippines

Route 77

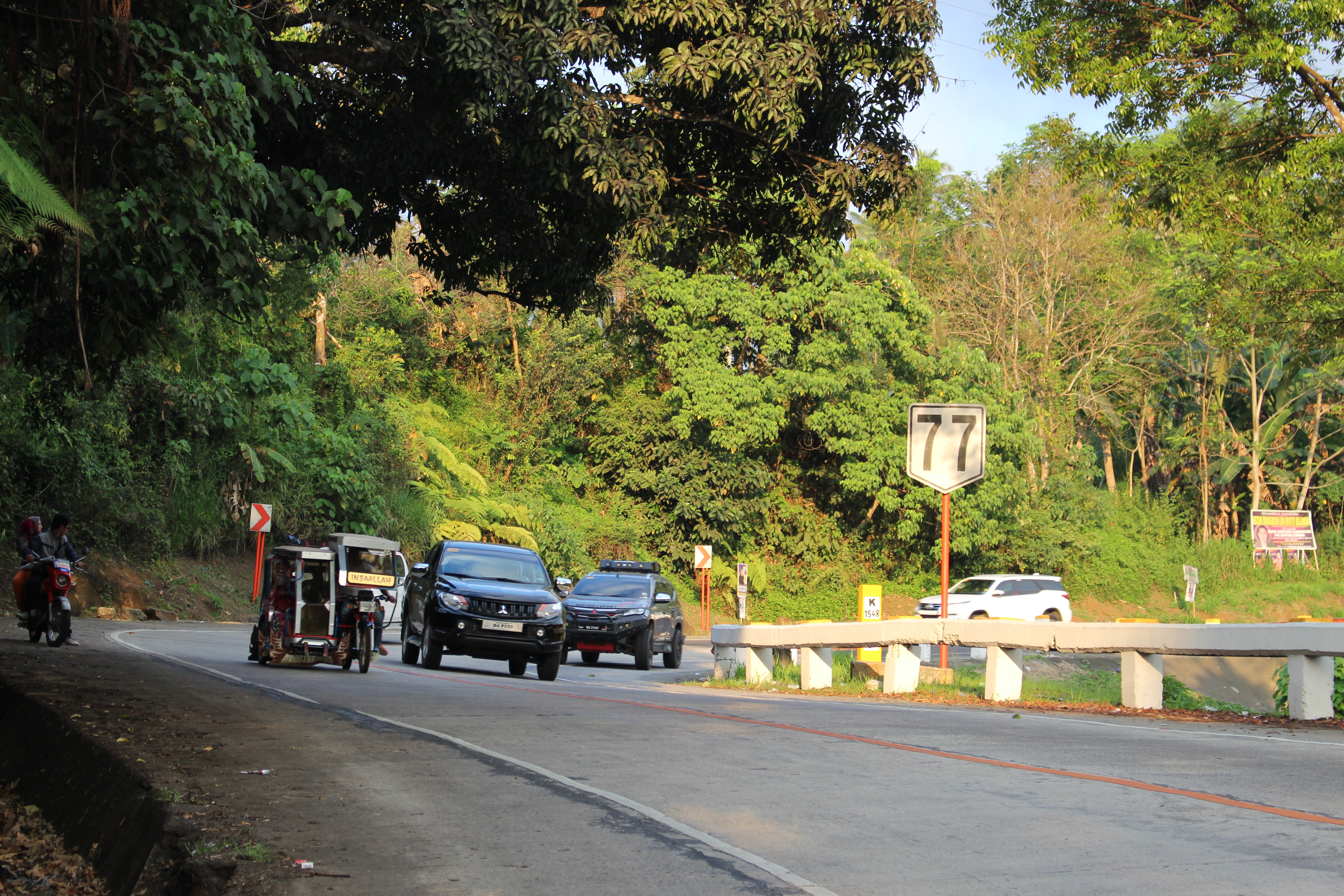

Major junctions
- North end: N9 (Misamis Oriental–Maria Cristina Boundary Road) in Balo-i
- N947 (Illigan-Marawi Airport Road); N948 (Marawi–Pugaan Road); N950 (Marawi–Ganassi Road)
- South end: AH 26 (N1) in Malabang

Location
- Country: Philippines

Highway system
- Roads in the Philippines; Highways; Expressways; List
| ← N76 | → N78 |

National Route 77 (N77) is a 99-kilometer (62 mi), two-to-four national primary road connecting Lanao del Norte and Lanao del Sur.

== History ==
The route numbers are implemented around early 2017. The Lanao del Norte portion is maintained by DPWH while the Lanao del Sur portion is maintained by Bangsamoro regional government.

== Route description ==
=== Iligan ===
N77 starts in Iligan as Misamis Oriental-Maria Cristina Boundary Road in a route change from N9.

=== Baloi to Saguiaran ===
After the end of the Iligan Section, it is called Iligan City-Marawi Road. After reaching Saguiaran, it is now maintained by the Bangsamoro Regional Government.

=== Marawi to Malabang ===
The road changes its name at parts of Lanao del Sur. It ends in Malabang at a half-y junction in AH26.
