= Lugait =

Municipality in Misamis Oriental, Philippines

- Municipality
- Municipality of Lugait
- Municipal Hall and Plaza

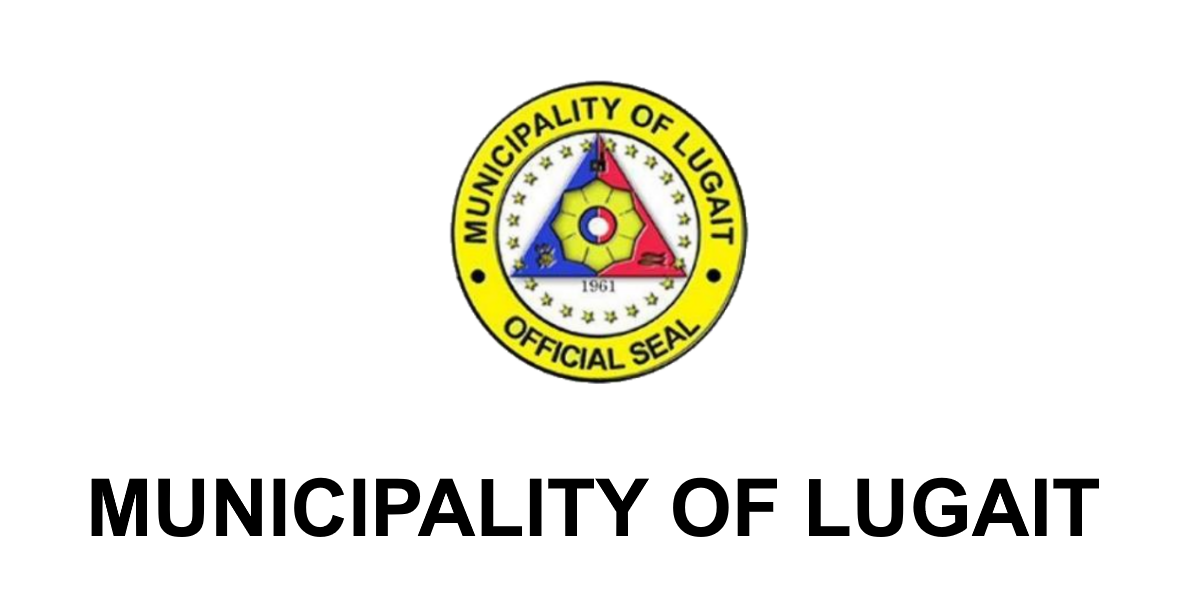
- Flag

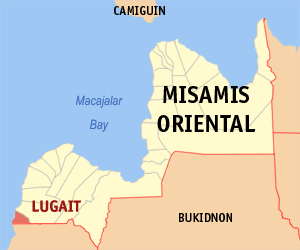
- Map of Misamis Oriental with Lugait highlighted
- Interactive map of Lugait
- Location within the Philippines
- Coordinates: 8°20′28″N 124°15′33″E
- Country: Philippines
- Region: Northern Mindanao
- Province: Misamis Oriental
- District: 2nd district
- Founded: March 16, 1961
- Barangays: 8 (see Barangays)

Government
  - Type: Sangguniang Bayan
  - Mayor: Wellie G. Lim
  - Vice Mayor: Roger G. Lim
  - Representative: Yevgeny Vincente B. Emano
  - Municipal Council: Members: Jay Michael T. Manlawe; Eddie R. Gabe; Patricio S. Hataas; Alberto S. Augusto; Adelfo M. Saura Sr.; Rued M. Sacabin; Juniolito B. Cabolbol; Dennis S. Bacatan
  - Electorate: 15,293 voters (2025)

Area
  - Total: 27.45 km^{2} (10.60 sq mi)
- Elevation: 89 m (292 ft)
- Highest elevation: 507 m (1,663 ft)
- Lowest elevation: 0 m (0 ft)

Population (2024 census)
  - Total: 20,946
  - Density: 763.1/km^{2} (1,976/sq mi)
  - Households: 5,062

Economy
  - Income class: 3rd municipal income class
  - Poverty incidence: 21.91% (2023)
  - Revenue: ₱ 180.1 million (2024)
  - Assets: ₱ 652.9 million (2024)
  - Expenditure: ₱ 166.8 million (2024)
  - Liabilities: ₱ 118.2 million (2024)

Service provider
  - Electricity: Misamis Oriental 1 Rural Electric Cooperative (MORESCO 1)
- Time zone: UTC+8 (PST)
- ZIP code: 9025
- PSGC: 1004316000
- IDD : area code: +63 (0)88
- Native languages: Cebuano; Binukid; Subanon; Tagalog

Lugait, officially the Municipality of Lugait (Cebuano: Lungsod sa Lugait; Tagalog: Bayan ng Lugait), is a municipality in the province of Misamis Oriental, Philippines. According to the 2024 census, it has a population of 20,946 people.

It is also spelled as Luga-it.

== History ==
Lugait was originally one of the barrios of Initao, Misamis Oriental until 1948. When Manticao was established as an independent municipality separate from Initao, Lugait became its largest barrio, having the highest population and making a significant contribution to the municipality’s revenue.

On March 16, 1961, Lugait achieved municipal independence from its mother municipality when then-President Carlos P. Garcia signed and issued Executive Order No. 425, officially creating the Municipality of Lugait in the province of Misamis Oriental.

From the beginning of its establishment, Lugait embraced industrial development and took advantage of the economic opportunities available during that period. The municipality soon gained recognition for its thriving cement and galvanized iron roofing industries, with these products becoming widely known and contributing greatly to Lugait’s growth and identity as an industrial community.

== Geography ==
Lugait is bounded on the west by Iligan Bay; north by the municipality of Manticao, Misamis Oriental; and south by Iligan City. As the westernmost municipality of Misamis Oriental, it lies approximately 80 kilometres (50 mi) from the regional capital of Northern Mindanao, Cagayan de Oro. It is also approximately 17 kilometres (11 mi) north of Iligan City.

It has a total land area of 27.45 square kilometres (10.60 sq mi). The coasts of Lugait are suitable for anchorage and navigation. A private wharf in fact is located at Salimbal Point.

Lugait's weather patterns follow the wet and dry seasons prevalent throughout the country. It however enjoys a typhoon free topography.

=== Barangays ===
Lugait is politically subdivided into 8 barangays. Each barangay consists of puroks while some have sitios.

- Aya-aya
- Betahon
- Biga
- Calangahan
- Kaluknayan
- Lower Talacogon
- Poblacion
- Upper Talacogon

=== Climate ===
Climate data for Lugait, Misamis Oriental
Month	Jan	Feb	Mar	Apr	May	Jun	Jul	Aug	Sep	Oct	Nov	Dec	Year
Mean daily maximum °C (°F)	29 (84)	29 (84)	30 (86)	31 (88)	30 (86)	30 (86)	30 (86)	30 (86)	30 (86)	30 (86)	29 (84)	29 (84)	30 (86)
Mean daily minimum °C (°F)	24 (75)	24 (75)	24 (75)	25 (77)	26 (79)	26 (79)	25 (77)	25 (77)	25 (77)	25 (77)	25 (77)	25 (77)	25 (77)
Average precipitation mm (inches)	159 (6.3)	143 (5.6)	166 (6.5)	183 (7.2)	357 (14.1)	414 (16.3)	333 (13.1)	309 (12.2)	289 (11.4)	285 (11.2)	253 (10.0)	166 (6.5)	3,057 (120.4)
Average rainy days	18.4	17.2	20.6	23.4	29.3	29.2	29.9	29.4	27.7	28.7	25.5	19.9	299.2
Source: Meteoblue

== Demographics ==
Population census of Lugait

Year	Pop.	±% p.a.
1970	7,457	—
1975	8,787	+3.35%
1980	10,785	+4.18%
1990	11,973	+1.05%
1995	13,012	+1.57%
2000	14,704	+2.66%

Year	Pop.	±% p.a.
2007	16,863	+1.91%
2010	18,639	+3.71%
2015	19,758	+1.12%
2020	20,559	+0.84%
2024	20,946	+0.45%

Source: Philippine Statistics Authority

Based on the 2024 census, the population of Lugait was 20,946 people, with a population density of approximately 763.05 inhabitants per square kilometre or 1,976.3 inhabitants per square mile.

=== Religion ===
Lugait is home to various religious groups. Christianity is the predominant religion in the municipality, with Roman Catholicism being one of the major denominations. Other Christian groups present in Lugait include the Assembly of God, United Church of Christ in the Philippines (UCCP), Baptist and Bible Fundamental churches, Seventh-day Adventist churches, Iglesia ni Cristo, and other Christian denominations.

== Economy ==
Poverty incidence of Lugait (%)

Source: Philippine Statistics Authority

=== Poverty Incidence ===
Poverty incidence in Lugait has declined in recent years. The municipality recorded a poverty incidence rate of approximately 16%, an improvement from its previous rate of around 23%.

The local government, in coordination with national and provincial agencies, has implemented various poverty reduction and livelihood programs. These initiatives include livelihood assistance from the Department of Social Welfare and Development (DSWD), employment and livelihood projects from the Department of Labor and Employment (DOLE), and local development programs aimed at improving household income and economic opportunities.

The municipality continues to work with government agencies, including the Philippine Statistics Authority (PSA), in monitoring socio-economic conditions and supporting poverty reduction efforts.

== Infrastructure ==
=== Transportation ===
Lugait is accessible by air through Laguindingan Airport in Laguindingan, Misamis Oriental and by sea through nearby ports, including the port facilities of Iligan City and Mukas Port in Kolambugan, Lanao del Norte. From these points, the municipality can be reached by buses, jeepneys, vans for hire, taxis, and other land transportation services.

The municipality is connected to nearby urban centers through the national highway. Travel time from Iligan City to Lugait generally takes around 30–45 minutes, while travel from Cagayan de Oro usually takes approximately 1–2 hours depending on traffic and road conditions.

Common modes of transportation within and around Lugait include jeepneys, buses, motorelas, tricycles, motorcycles for hire, and taxis.

=== Utilities ===
All barangays in Lugait are supplied with electricity through the Misamis Oriental Electric Cooperative (MORESCO-1), which provides power distribution services throughout the municipality.

Lugait also hosts power-related facilities that contribute to the stability of the electricity supply in Northern Mindanao. These include the Mapalad Power Corporation facility and a substation operated by the National Power Corporation, which supports the transmission and distribution network in the area.

Telecommunication and internet services in Lugait are provided by various telecommunications companies, including PLDT, Smart Communications, Globe Telecom, and Dito Telecommunity. These providers operate communication facilities that provide mobile and internet connectivity to residents throughout the municipality, including barangays located in more remote areas.
