= Villanueva, Misamis Oriental =

Municipality in Misamis Oriental, Philippines

Villanueva
- Municipality
- Municipality of Villanueva
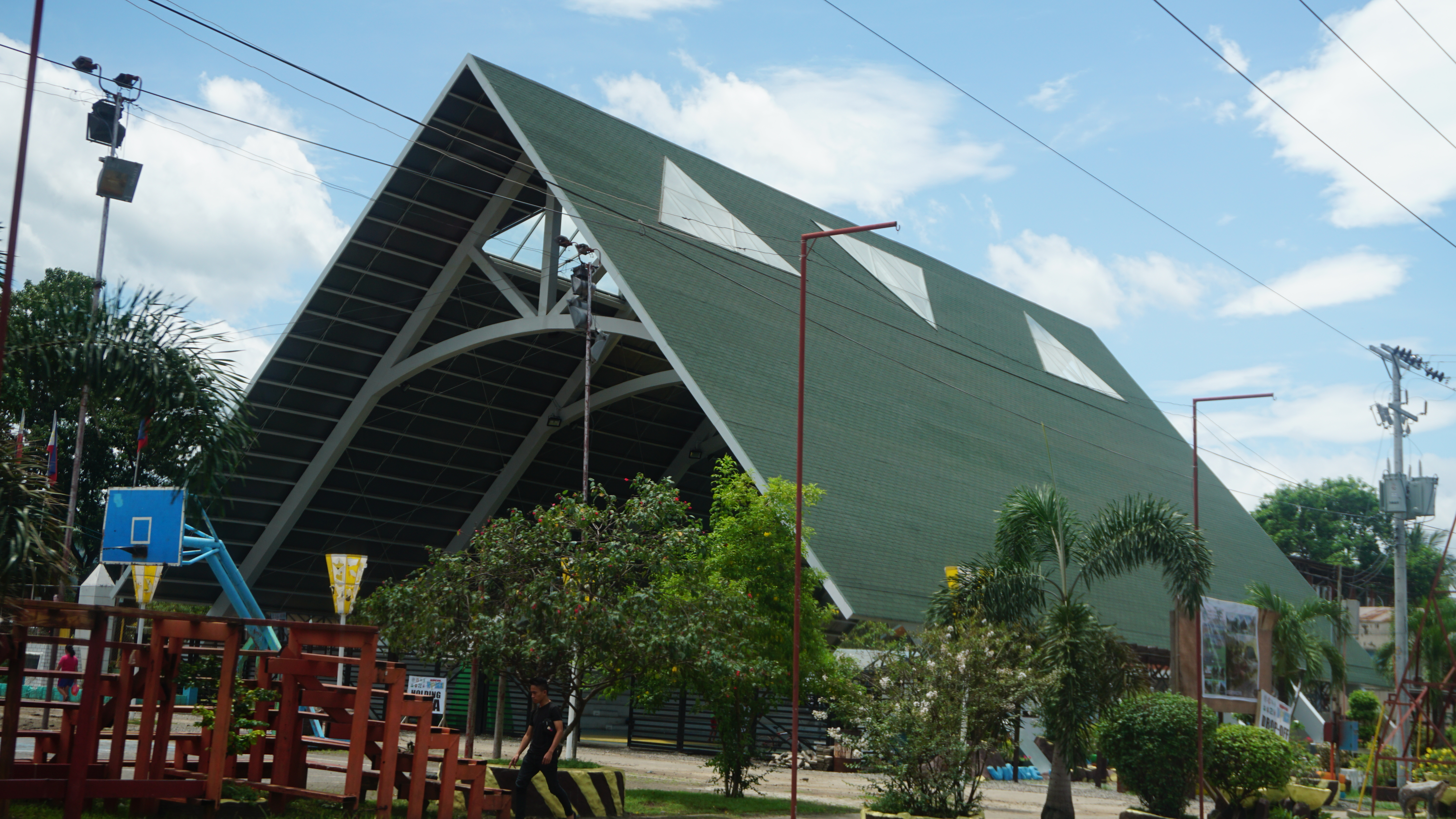
- Villanueva Municipal Covered Court

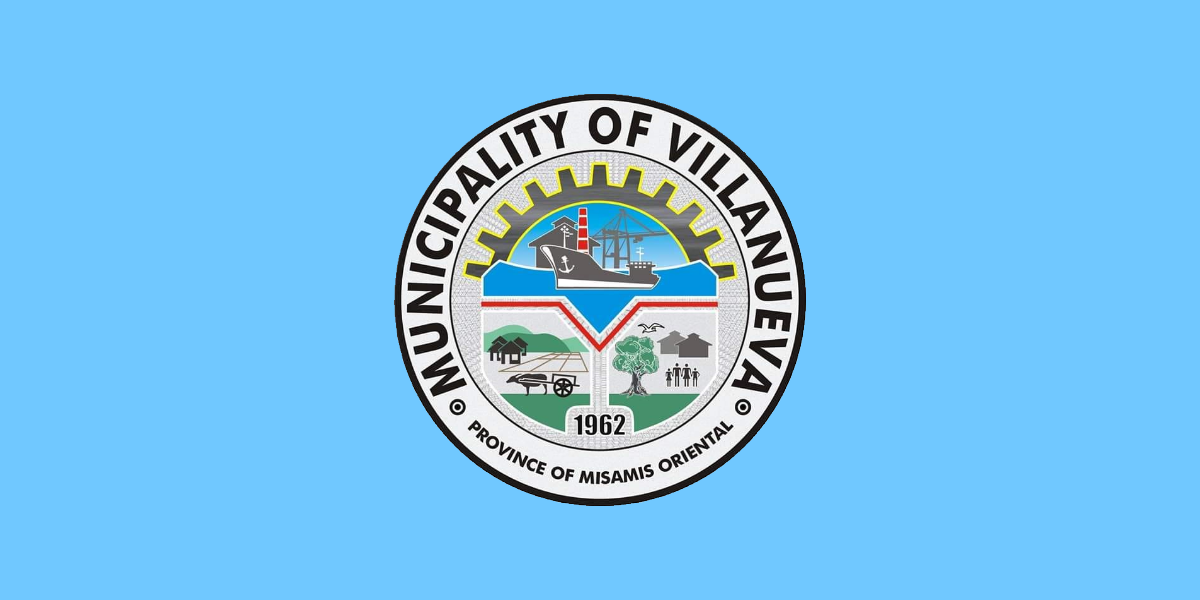
- Flag

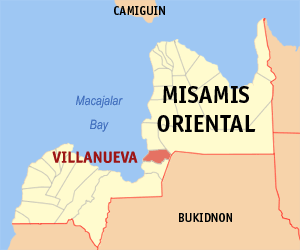
- Map of Misamis Oriental with Villanueva highlighted
- Interactive map of Villanueva
- Location within the Philippines
- Coordinates: 8°35′N 124°47′E
- Country: Philippines
- Region: Northern Mindanao
- Province: Misamis Oriental
- District: 2nd district
- Founded: June 16, 1962
- Barangays: 11 (see Barangays)

Government
  - Type: Sangguniang Bayan
  - Mayor: Jennie Rosalie T. Uy
  - Vice Mayor: Jeric Emano
  - Representative: Yevgeny Vincente B. Emano
  - Municipal Council: Members: Celso N. Casiño; Jeric G. Emano; Diosdado G. Balhon; Sheriza Anne F. Bantug; Leoncio J. Abejo; Nilo B. Belgado; Edgardo A. Permi; Jovenil B. Jabiniao
  - Electorate: 29,759 voters (2025)

Area
  - Total: 48.80 km^{2} (18.84 sq mi)
- Elevation: 93 m (305 ft)
- Highest elevation: 578 m (1,896 ft)
- Lowest elevation: 0 m (0 ft)

Population (2024 census)
  - Total: 42,456
  - Density: 870.0/km^{2} (2,253/sq mi)
  - Households: 9,440

Economy
  - Income class: 1st municipal income class
  - Poverty incidence: 23.42% (2023)
  - Revenue: ₱ 387.2 million (2024)
  - Assets: ₱ 1,413 million (2024)
  - Expenditure: ₱ 348.8 million (2024)
  - Liabilities: ₱ 670.3 million (2024)

Service provider
  - Electricity: Cagayan Electric Power and Light Company (CEPALCO)
- Time zone: UTC+8 (PST)
- ZIP code: 9002
- PSGC: 1004326000
- IDD : area code: +63 (0)88
- Native languages: Cebuano; Binukid; Subanon; Tagalog
- Website: www.villanuevamisor.gov.ph

Villanueva, officially the Municipality of Villanueva (Cebuano: Lungsod sa Villanueva; Tagalog: Bayan ng Villanueva), is a municipality in the province of Misamis Oriental, Philippines. According to the 2024 census, it has a population of 42,456 people.

== History ==
Long before the Spanish colonization, the place was originally named "Bongloy" by the natives called the Magahats, because of the three gigantic Bongloy trees that grew in the place where the Catholic church and town plaza stands today.

In 1830, the mission of Jasaan, an adjacent town to the north, was to establish separation from Cagayan de Oro and evangelization to as far as the towns of Sumilao, Linabo and Malitbog in the province of Bukidnon. Its center of civilization and the first Church was at "Daanglungsod" which is now the Aplaya, Jasaan, where an old kota (watchtower) still exists, thus marked the birth of Christianity in Bongloy.

Father Gregorio Parache, S.J., - (432 local historical sources of Northern Mindanao by Father Francisco Demetrio, S. J), who was the parish priest of Jasaan at that time brought a certain Captain Villanueva to Bongloy. Villanueva was a Mexican-American soldier who was one of the occupants of Balingasag Convent during the American occupation of the Philippines.

Father Parache requested Captain Villanueva to assist him in the plans and then commissioned the captain to develop a potable water and irrigation system in the Bongloy area. As the years passed, the Magahats moved eastward below the town of Claveria and began calling Bongloy as Villanueva in honor of the captain. The word Villanueva was handed down through word of mouth in the succeeding generations.

== Geography ==
=== Barangays ===
Villanueva is politically subdivided into 11 barangays. Each barangay consists of puroks while some have sitios.

- Balacanas
- Dayawan
- Katipunan
- Kimaya
- Poblacion 1
- Poblacion 2
- Poblacion 3
- San Martin
- Tambobong
- Imelda
- Looc

=== Climate ===
Climate data for Villanueva, Misamis Oriental
Month	Jan	Feb	Mar	Apr	May	Jun	Jul	Aug	Sep	Oct	Nov	Dec	Year
Mean daily maximum °C (°F)	28 (82)	29 (84)	30 (86)	31 (88)	30 (86)	30 (86)	30 (86)	30 (86)	30 (86)	30 (86)	29 (84)	29 (84)	30 (85)
Mean daily minimum °C (°F)	24 (75)	24 (75)	24 (75)	25 (77)	26 (79)	26 (79)	25 (77)	25 (77)	25 (77)	25 (77)	25 (77)	25 (77)	25 (77)
Average precipitation mm (inches)	271 (10.7)	217 (8.5)	193 (7.6)	178 (7.0)	344 (13.5)	423 (16.7)	362 (14.3)	358 (14.1)	329 (13.0)	320 (12.6)	322 (12.7)	260 (10.2)	3,577 (140.9)
Average rainy days	23.2	19.5	22.0	22.8	29.6	28.9	30.3	29.8	28.1	28.8	26.1	24.1	313.2
Source: Meteoblue

== Demographics ==
Population census of Villanueva

Year	Pop.	±% p.a.
1970	6,889	—
1975	9,863	+7.46%
1980	11,895	+3.82%
1990	17,122	+3.71%
1995	21,310	+4.19%
2000	24,867	+3.36%

Year	Pop.	±% p.a.
2007	29,315	+2.30%
2010	31,966	+3.20%
2015	39,378	+4.05%
2020	40,419	+0.55%
2024	42,456	+1.19%

Source: Philippine Statistics Authority

In the 2024 census, the population of Villanueva was 42,456 people, with a density of 870 inhabitants per square kilometre or 2,300 inhabitants per square mile.

== Economy ==
Poverty incidence of Villanueva (%)

Source: Philippine Statistics Authority

The presence of companies like Philippine Sinter Corporation (PSC), STEAG State Power Inc., Purina, and recent opening Coca-Cola Bottlers Philippines Inc. contributes to the municipality's income although it is largely agricultural.

== Culture ==
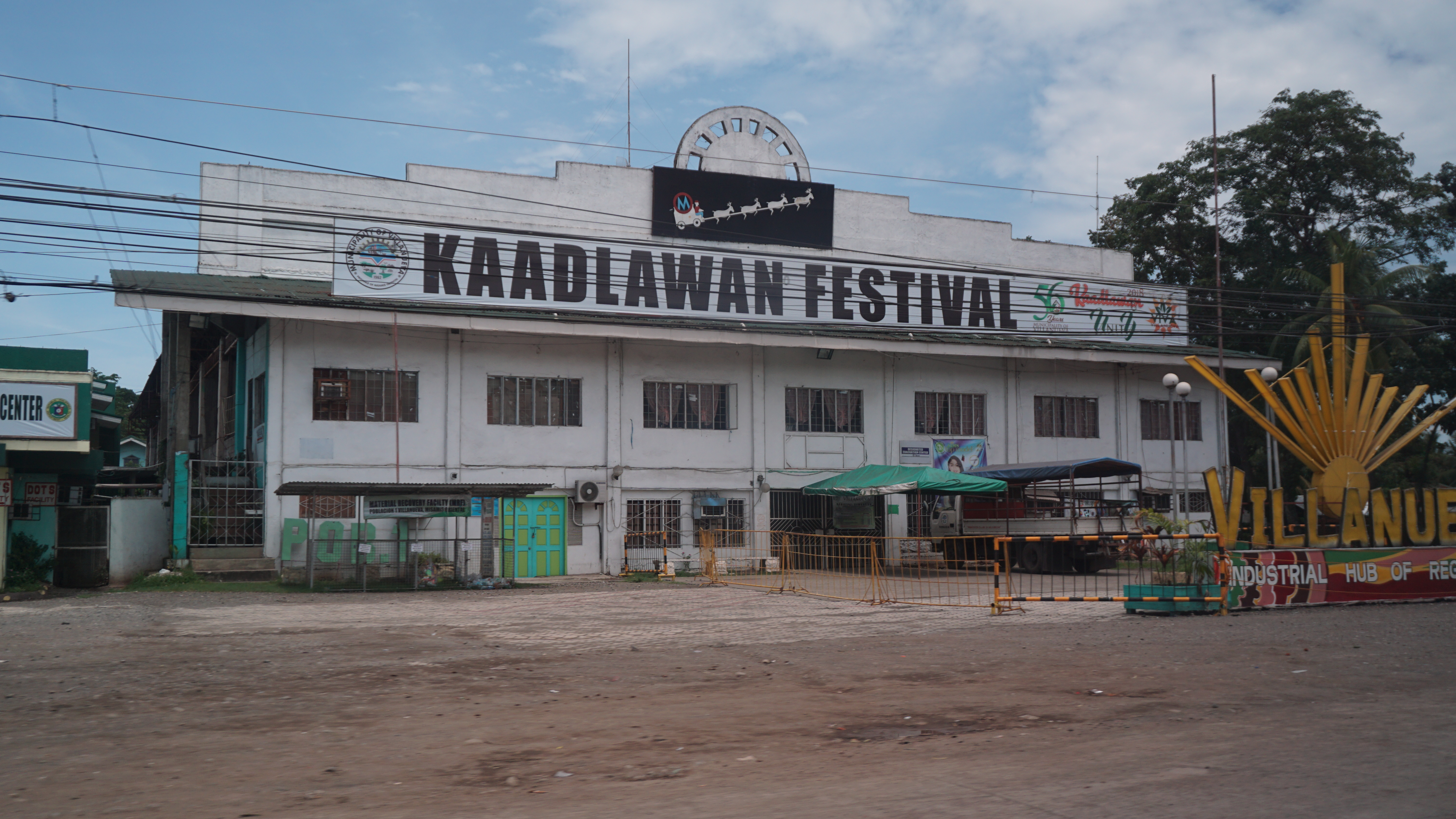
Villanueva Municipal Gymnasium

Villanueva celebrates the feast of the Our Lady of Guadalupe every December 12. In 2015, it celebrated its ″1st Bongloy Festival″.
