= Medina, Misamis Oriental =

Municipality in Misamis Oriental, Philippines

Medina
- Municipality
- Municipality of Medina
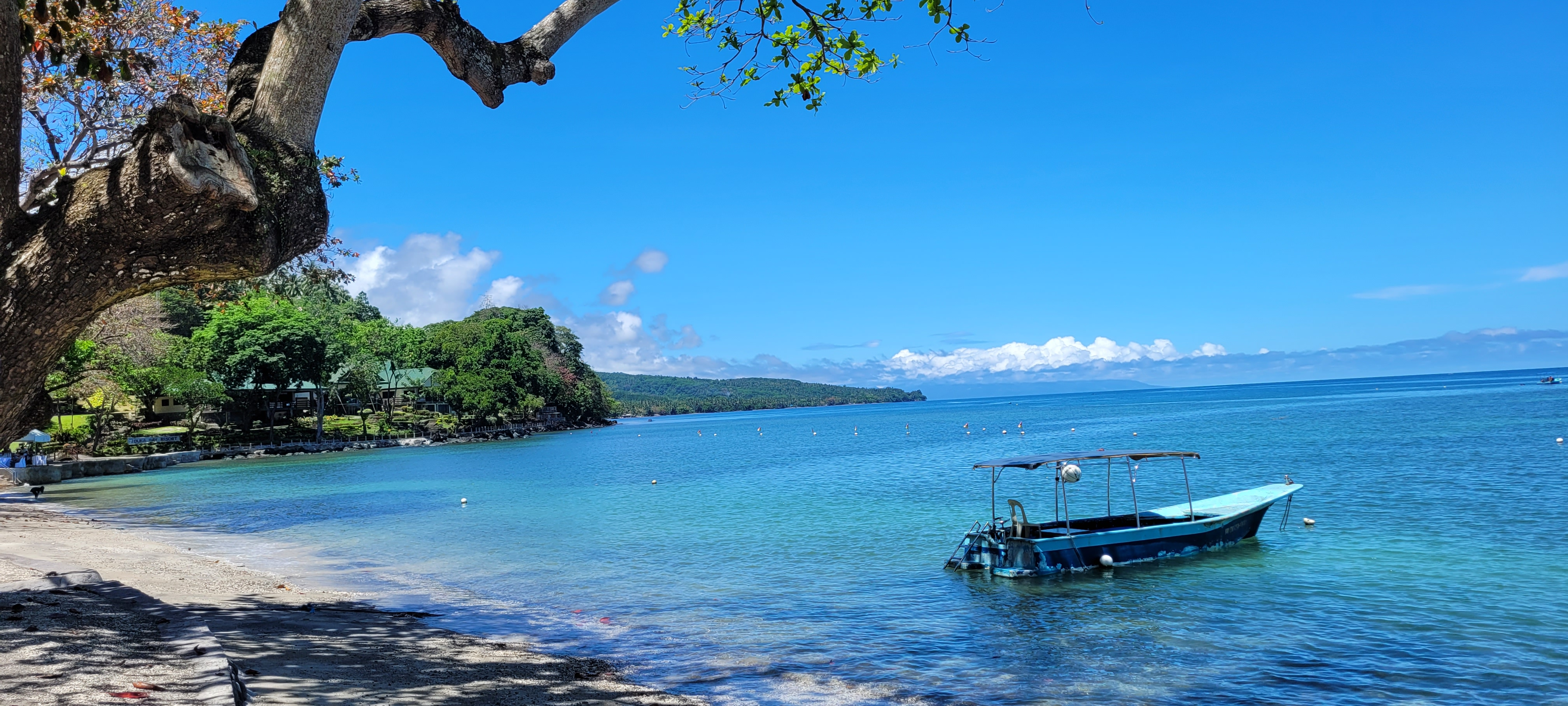
- Duka Beach in Medina

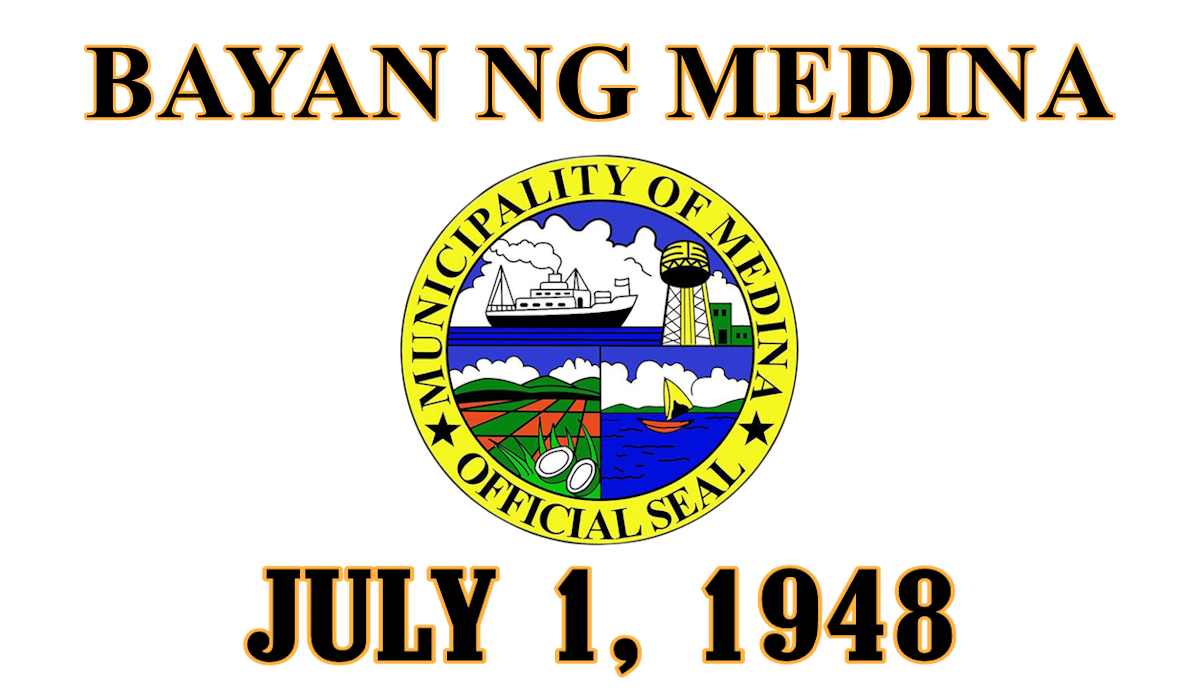
- Flag

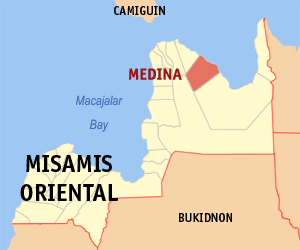
- Map of Misamis Oriental with Medina highlighted
- Interactive map of Medina
- Location within the Philippines
- Coordinates: 8°55′N 125°01′E
- Country: Philippines
- Region: Northern Mindanao
- Province: Misamis Oriental
- District: 1st district
- Founded: July 1, 1948
- Named for: Medina, Spain
- Barangays: 19 (see Barangays)

Government
  - Type: Sangguniang Bayan
  - Mayor: Marriane Chan
  - Vice Mayor: Paulo Magallanes
  - Representative: Karen Lagbas
  - Municipal Council: Members: Balingit, Dandan; Corrales, Roy; Ke-e, Aime; Amper, Anol; Pelaez, Jelizza; Cahoy, Arthur; Tarongoy, Peping; Naguib, Esmael
  - Electorate: 26,525 voters (2025)

Area
  - Total: 148.29 km^{2} (57.26 sq mi)
- Elevation: 82 m (269 ft)
- Highest elevation: 771 m (2,530 ft)
- Lowest elevation: 0 m (0 ft)

Population (2024 census)
  - Total: 36,692
  - Density: 247.43/km^{2} (640.85/sq mi)
  - Households: 8,521

Economy
  - Income class: 2nd municipal income class
  - Poverty incidence: 22.78% (2023)
  - Revenue: ₱ 204.9 million (2024)
  - Assets: ₱ 501 million (2024)
  - Expenditure: ₱ 193.1 million (2024)
  - Liabilities: ₱ 119.9 million (2024)

Service provider
  - Electricity: Misamis Oriental 2 Rural Electric Cooperative (MORESCO 2)
- Time zone: UTC+8 (PST)
- ZIP code: 9013
- PSGC: 1004319000
- IDD : area code: +63 (0)88
- Native languages: Cebuano; Binukid; Subanon; Tagalog
- Website: www.medinamisor.gov.ph

Medina, officially the Municipality of Medina (Cebuano: Lungsod sa Medina; Tagalog: Bayan ng Medina), is a municipality in the province of Misamis Oriental, Philippines.According to the 2020 census, in 2020 it has the population approximately of 35,612 and according to the 2024 census, in 2024 it has a population of approximately 36,692 people.

The town got its name from Medina-Sidonia, Spain, after the Spaniards noticed the similarities of the features of the place with the ones in Medina-Sidonia.

== Geography ==
=== Barangays ===
Medina is politically subdivided into 19 barangays.

- Bangbang
- Bulwa
- Cabug
- Dig-aguyan
- Duka
- Gasa
- Maanas
- Mananum Bag-o
- Mananum Daan
- North Poblacion
- Pahindong
- Portulin
- San Isidro
- San Jose
- San Roque
- San Vicente
- South Poblacion
- Tambagan
- Tup-on

=== Popular Places ===
- Medina National Comprehensive High School
- Governor Pelaez Elementary School
- San Isidro Labrador Parish Church
- Duka Bay Resort
- Alibuag Cold Spring
- B-Bai Resort
- Mt. Kabistel
- Medina First General Hospital

=== Climate ===
Climate data for Medina, Misamis Oriental
Month	Jan	Feb	Mar	Apr	May	Jun	Jul	Aug	Sep	Oct	Nov	Dec	Year
Mean daily maximum °C (°F)	28 (82)	28 (82)	29 (84)	30 (86)	30 (86)	30 (86)	30 (86)	30 (86)	30 (86)	29 (84)	29 (84)	28 (82)	29 (85)
Mean daily minimum °C (°F)	23 (73)	23 (73)	23 (73)	23 (73)	25 (77)	25 (77)	25 (77)	25 (77)	25 (77)	25 (77)	24 (75)	24 (75)	24 (75)
Average precipitation mm (inches)	327 (12.9)	254 (10.0)	185 (7.3)	128 (5.0)	215 (8.5)	273 (10.7)	248 (9.8)	243 (9.6)	214 (8.4)	246 (9.7)	271 (10.7)	271 (10.7)	2,875 (113.3)
Average rainy days	24.3	21.1	22.5	20.6	28.3	28.8	29.4	29.0	28.0	28.3	26.0	24.2	310.5
Source: Meteoblue

== Demographics ==
Population census of Medina

Year	Pop.	±% p.a.
1948	8,893	—
1960	11,856	+2.42%
1970	15,185	+2.50%
1975	18,441	+3.97%
1980	19,888	+1.52%
1990	21,796	+0.92%
1995	23,319	+1.27%

Year	Pop.	±% p.a.
2000	25,810	+2.20%
2007	28,484	+1.37%
2010	31,154	+3.31%
2015	32,907	+1.05%
2020	35,612	+1.68%
2024	36,692	+0.72%

Source: Philippine Statistics Authority

In the 2024 census, the population of Medina was 36,692 people, with a density of 250 inhabitants per square kilometre or 650 inhabitants per square mile.

== Economy ==
Poverty incidence of Medina (%)

Source: Philippine Statistics Authority

== Tourism ==
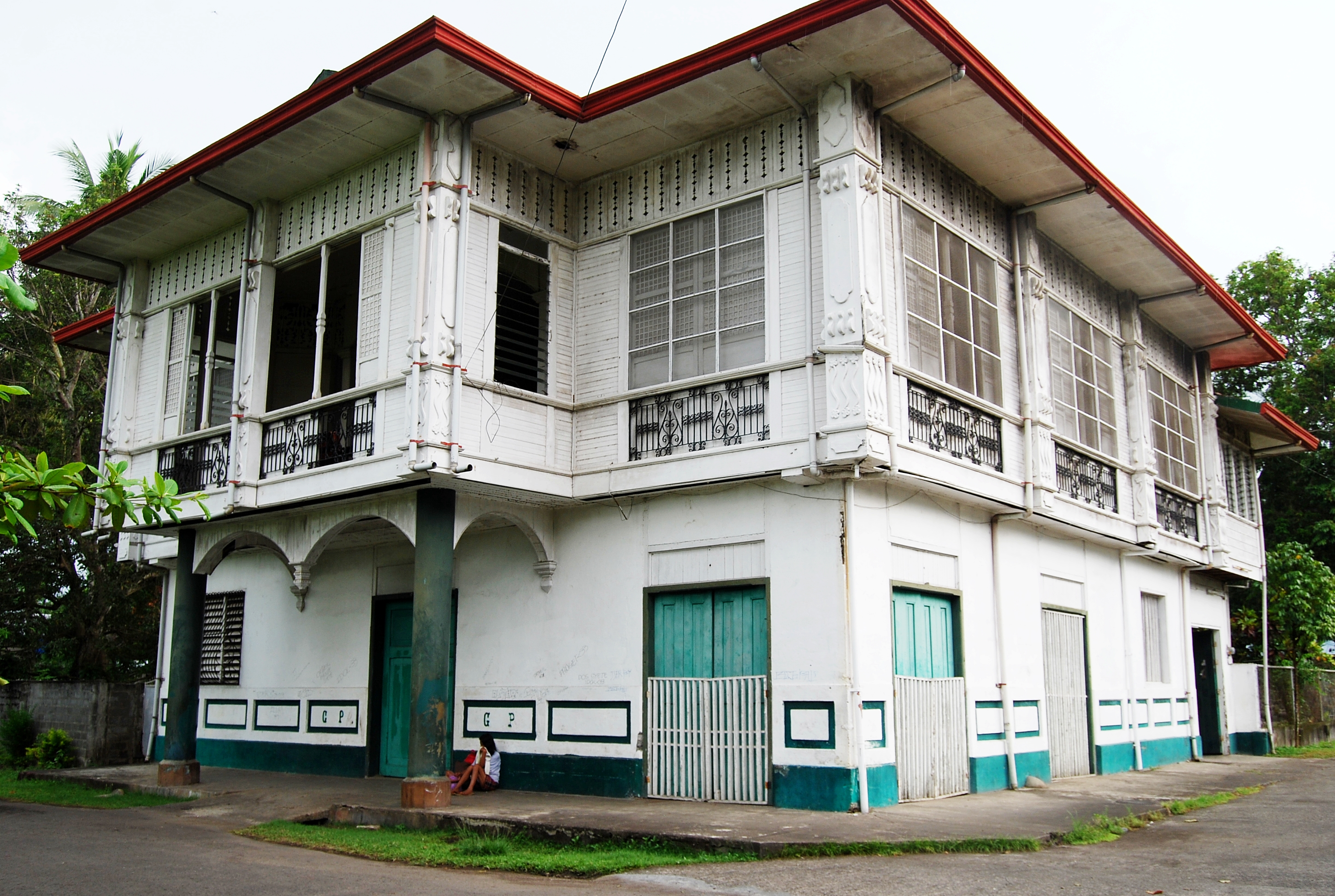
Pelaez Ancestral House

- Portulin - from the phrase "Port of Orleans", where long ago big passenger ships came to pick up some passenger using small boats.
- Pelaez Ancestral House
