= Pelaez Ancestral House =

Pelaez Ancestral "White" House
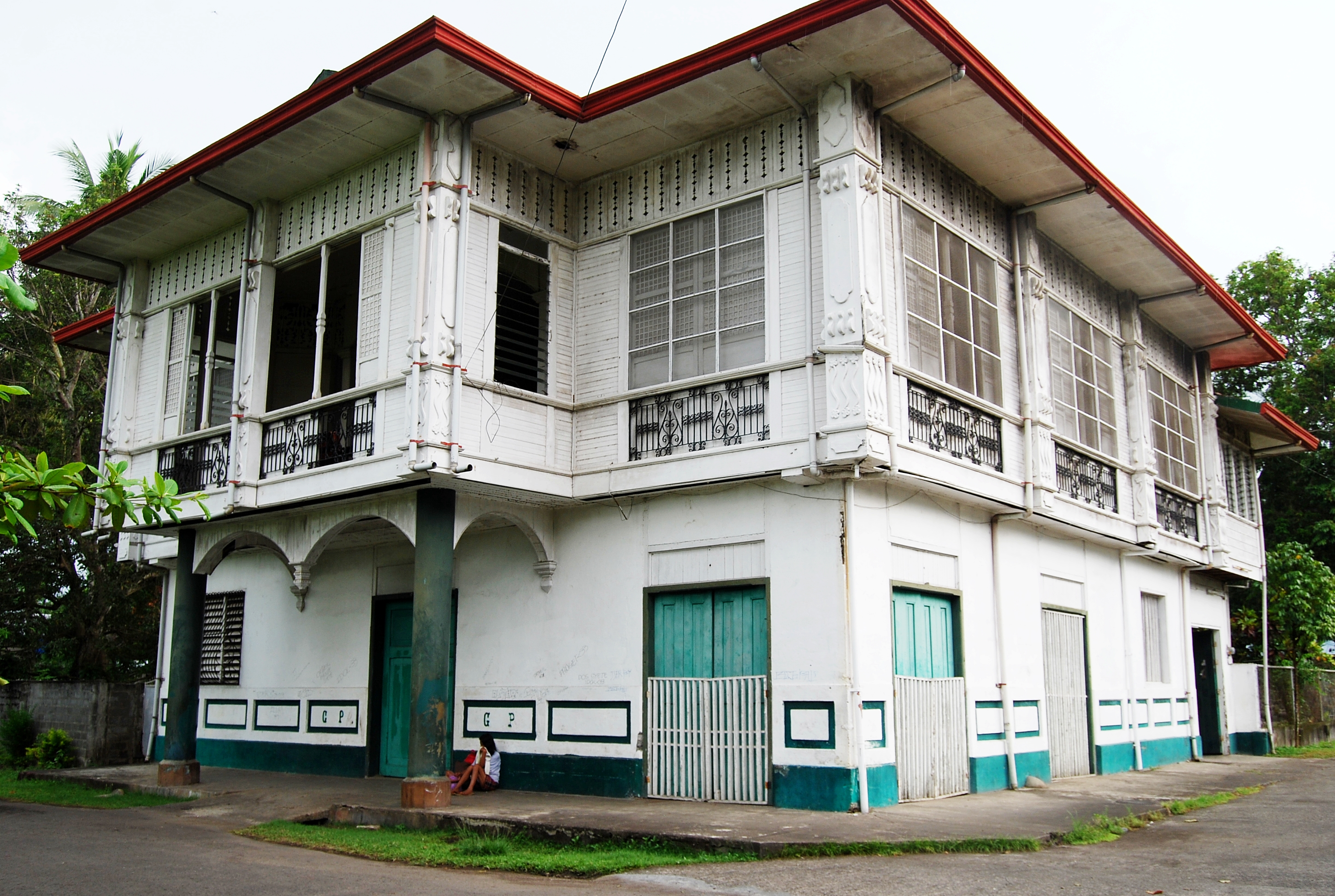
- The "White House" of Medina
- Interactive map of the Pelaez Ancestral "White" House area

General information
- Type: Heritage House
- Architectural style: Beaux-Art style
- Location: Pelaez St., North Poblacion, Medina, Misamis Oriental, Philippines
- Coordinates: 8.911382°N 125.026006°E
- Completed: 1920-1922
- Owner: Pelaez family

Design and construction
- Architect: Japanese Maestro Carpentero

Website
- Pelaez Ancestral House

Located in the eastern portion of Misamis Oriental and roughly a 3-hour drive from Cagayan de Oro is the historical haven of North Poblacion in the Municipality of Medina where the Pelaez Ancestral House can be found standing still. This house had stood witness to the diverse political and historical lives of two of the famous bygone personalities in the politics arena in the locality and in the country as well – Don Gregorio A. Pelaez, Sr. (first governor of Misamis Oriental) and his son, Emmanuel N. Pelaez, Sr. (elected Vice President of the Philippines in 1961 under the Diosdado Macapagal Administration). When people ask for direction, the local townsfolk refer to the house as the "Pelaez White House" because of the walls that are washed in white.

== History ==
The use of this house has seen various transformations through the different meanings that correspond to the changes of time. In the early times, the house was usually associated with Gregorio A. Pelaez, Sr. who was the paramount political icon of Misamis Oriental (1926-1931 and 1938-1940) being the very first governor of the province back in the time when Misamis Oriental was officially separated from Misamis Occidental by Republic Act No. 3777 on 28 November 1939. Later on, another Pelaez entered the political arena of the Philippines – Emmanuel N. Pelaez, Sr., son of Gregorio A. Pelaez. Emmanuel Pelaez became the first Mindanawon elected in the Vice-Presidency position in the Philippines.

The late vice president, who was born November 30, 1915, recalled that the house was built around 1920 to 1922. According to him also, the construction of the house was supervised by a Japanese maestro carpenter and the lumber was cut right there in the house’s vicinity (Pelaez, pers. com. 2002).

The political contributions of the Pelaez clan in the Philippines have indisputably made significant impacts in the annal of history of Misamis Oriental as well as the Philippines. In fact, current vice-governor of Misamis Oriental is also from the influential clan of the Pelaez in the person of Jose Mari G. Pelaez.

== House features ==
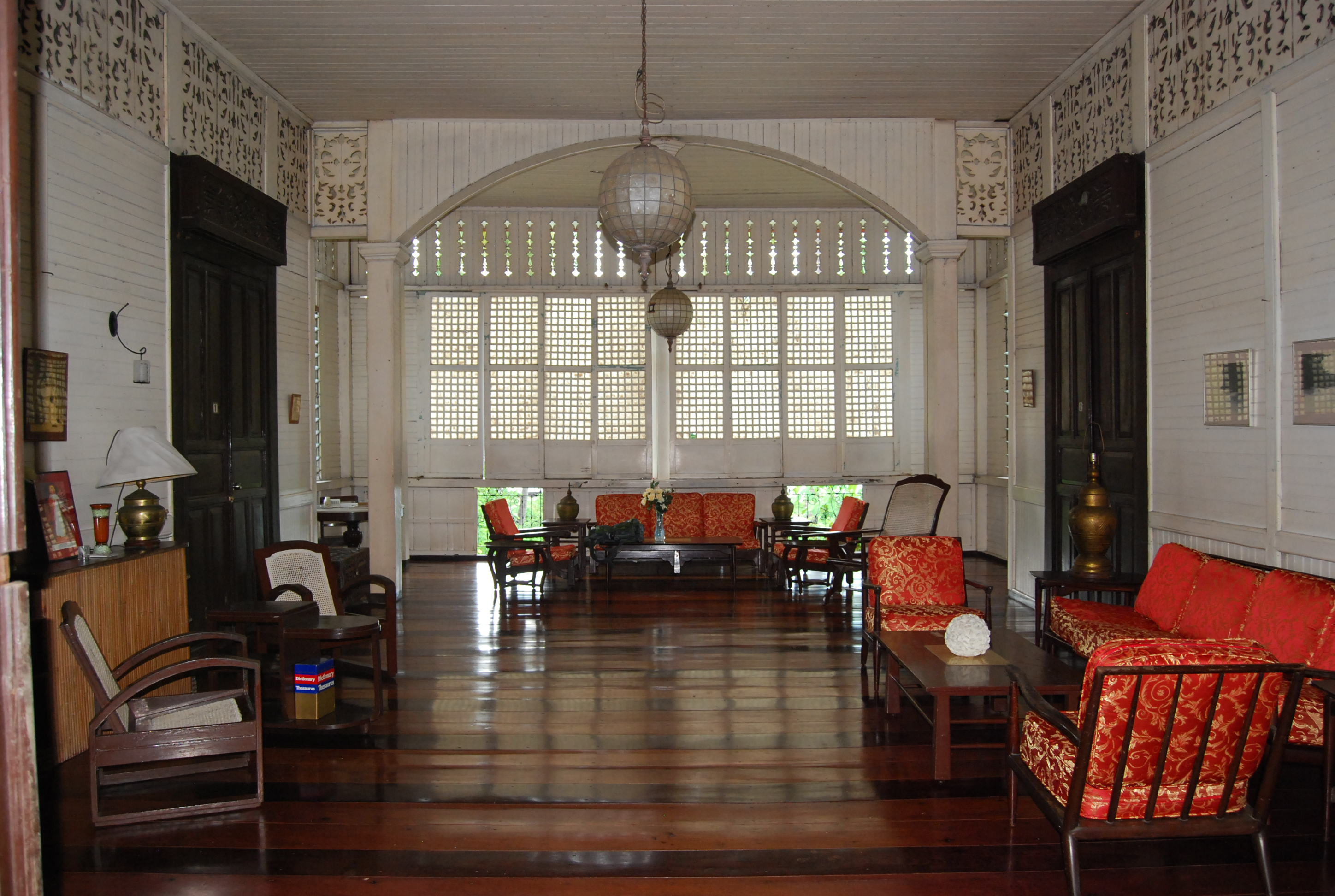

The house is inspired by a Beaux Art architectural design due to its very well defined decorative articulation in its pilasters. The graceful proportion and tasteful details contribute to the quality aesthetics of the house. The second floor has the traditional sliding capiz windows with balustraded ventanillas. Above the windows is a series of transoms with traceries. The design is basically square in plan, broken only by the central portion of the facade on the second floor which juts out over the main entry.

The house has 2 floors. It also has a very spacious surroundings evidenced by the coconuts, poultry and a grotto of Mother Mary. Perhaps, the spacious area indicates how wealthy and prominent the Pelaez are.

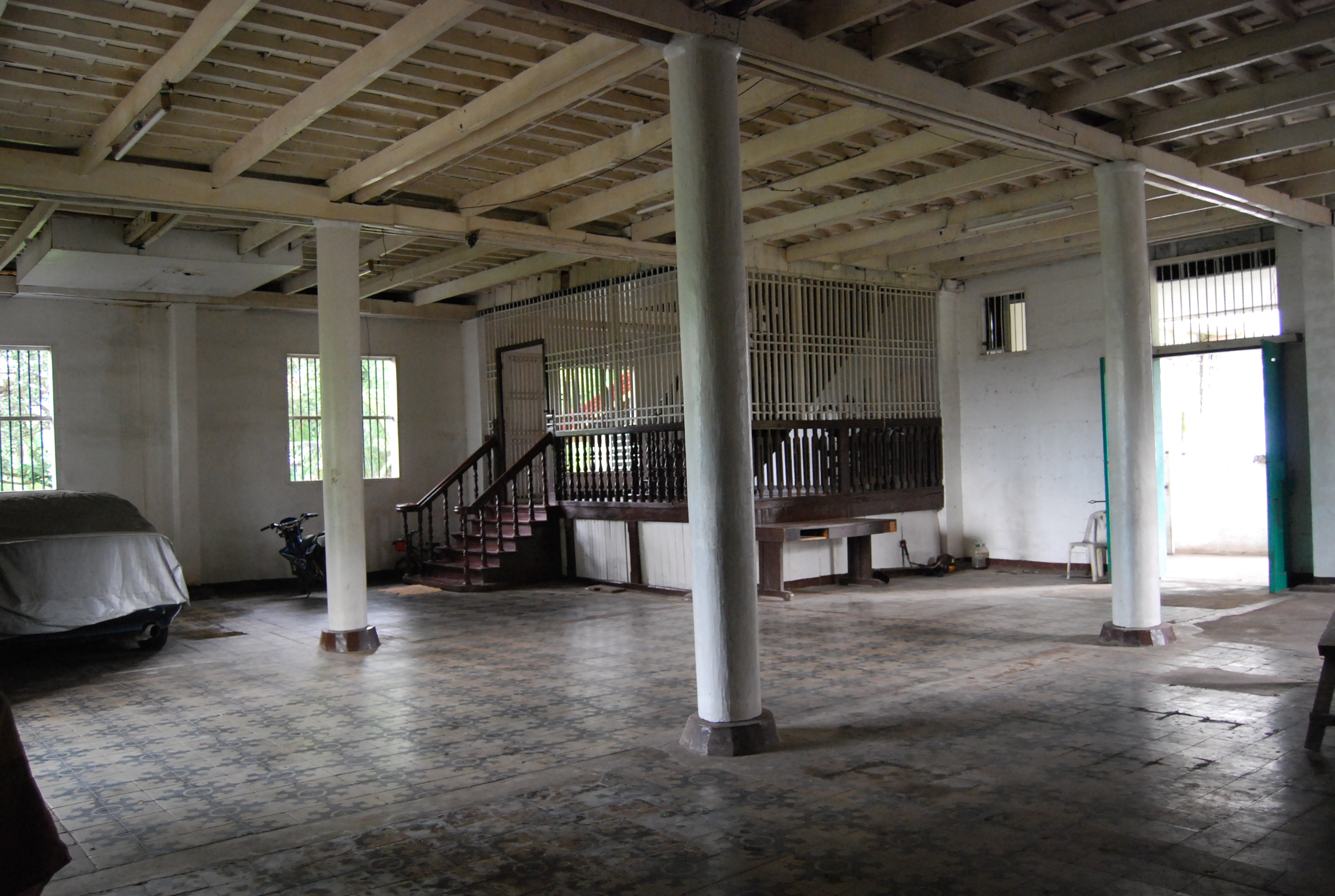

Huge and rigid support pillars can be found at the ground floor of the house. They provide strong structural support to the second floor. Notable enough, the tiles used on the flooring gives an elegant view and one can imagine how marvelous could the view be in its early years. But as of the present, some tiles are no longer in good shape. The pillars on the second floor are said to be made of "Iron-Wood".

There are 2 staircases made of a so-called "Balayong" materials that a person will encounter as he enters the second floor of the house. In totality, there are 3 staircases in the house. Aside from those mentioned, there is one staircase that can be found at the back of the house which, apparently, is in a bad condition already. After climbing up the sturdy and elegant 2 staircases, a person is welcomed with a shiny wooden floor which has a repetitive pattern of brown and dark brown. Then, as you continue your step and as you raise your head upward, one will find himself in awe of the elegant heirlooms left by the forefathers of the Pelaez kin.

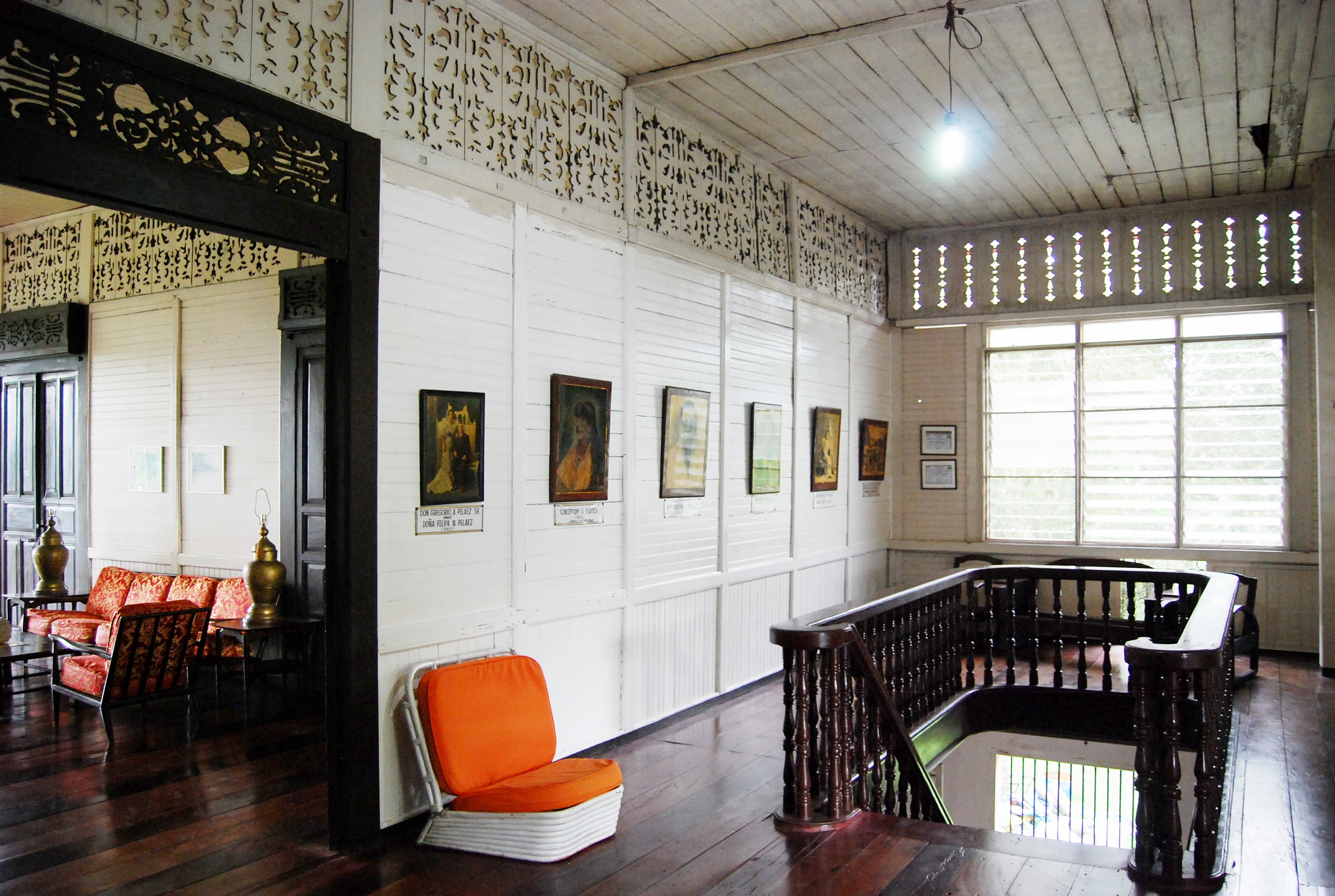

Though some of the photos no longer resides in the house, there are still some photos that remained. These photos are displayed in one corner of the house. Photos of Don Gregorio Pelaez Sr. solo and with his second wife Felipa Neri Pelaez in 1907, 1936 and 1957 during their 50th anniversary can be found preserved. One photo also displays the mother of Felipa, Concepcion V. Fortich. There is also one photo of the whole Pelaez kin during a gathering of the birthday anniversary of Don Gregorio Pelaez in year 1965. Of course, there is also a photo of the late vice president, Emmanuel N. Pelaez. Other photos that are being hung on the wall include certificates of recognition from various award-giving body who recognized the great contributions of the Pelaez.

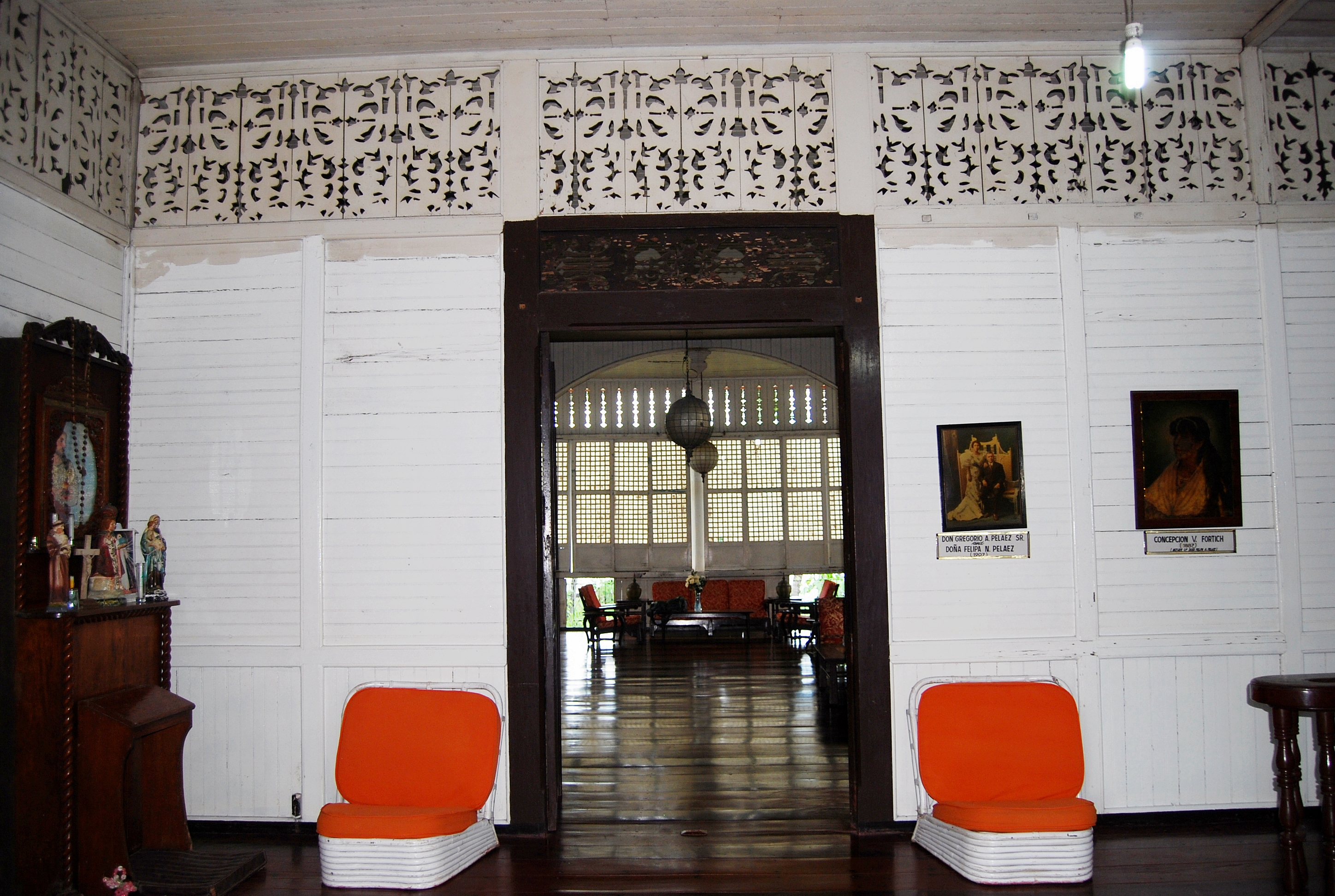

Some antique items also remained inside the house. For instance, there are these wooden chairs and tables in the dining area. There is also a metallic table and chairs along with dining-ware composed of porcelain and glass plates, cups, saucers, teapots and other containers for condiments.

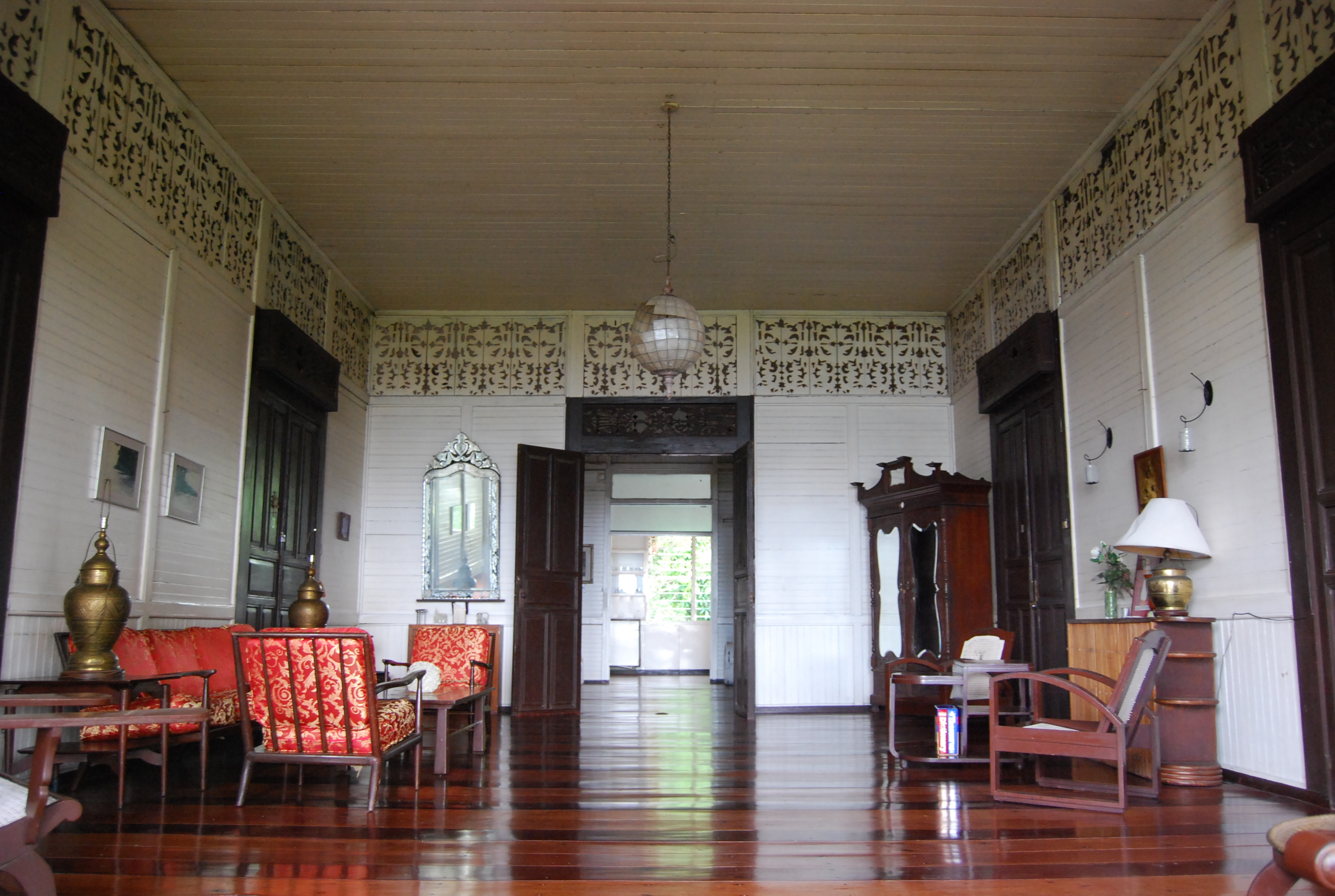

One can also appreciate how devoted the Pelaez are in their catholic faith as evidenced by an antique item being displayed by religious relics. Below it is a comfortable platform where a person kneel in solemn prayer.

Bronze metallic containers and plates with intricate details can also be seen being displayed in the "sala" (living room) of the house. One beautiful antique item that can also be found in the sala is this chest or also known in Filipino as "baul" that is artistically carved with a somewhat an abstract design. The wooden and metallic elements of the sala are as well as antique as the house itself. The only parts that were changed are the bench's and chair's foams and covers.

Visible on top of every door and on the uppermost corner of every wall of the sala is one thing that gives the inner part of the house a grandiose feeling. This is said to be a Japanese inspired carving designs which speak and/or symbolize a meaning. The sala is also illuminated at night by a round shape white object that contains a light bulb inside.

The house has a total of 8 rooms. 2 of these rooms are dedicated for house guests and a single room for the caretakers. The rest of the rooms are reserved for the members of the Pelaez clan who wish to visit and stay in the house.

If you happen to observe carefully, not only the outer surfaces of the house are washed in white, but the inner walls of the house are white as well. There seems to be a minor to no degradation on the materials of the house - a proof that this house is excellently maintained.

== Present Times ==
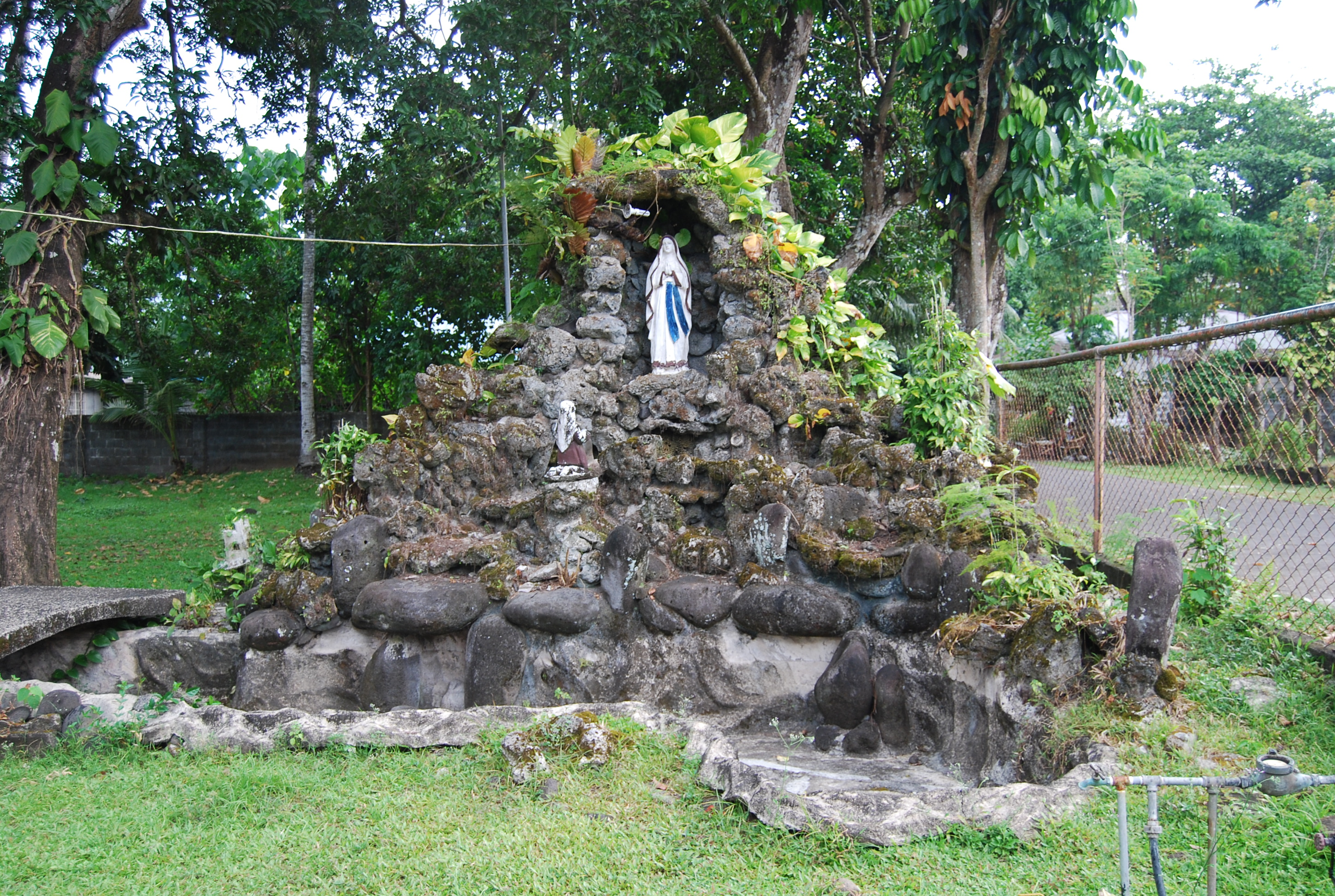
Mother Mary Grotto

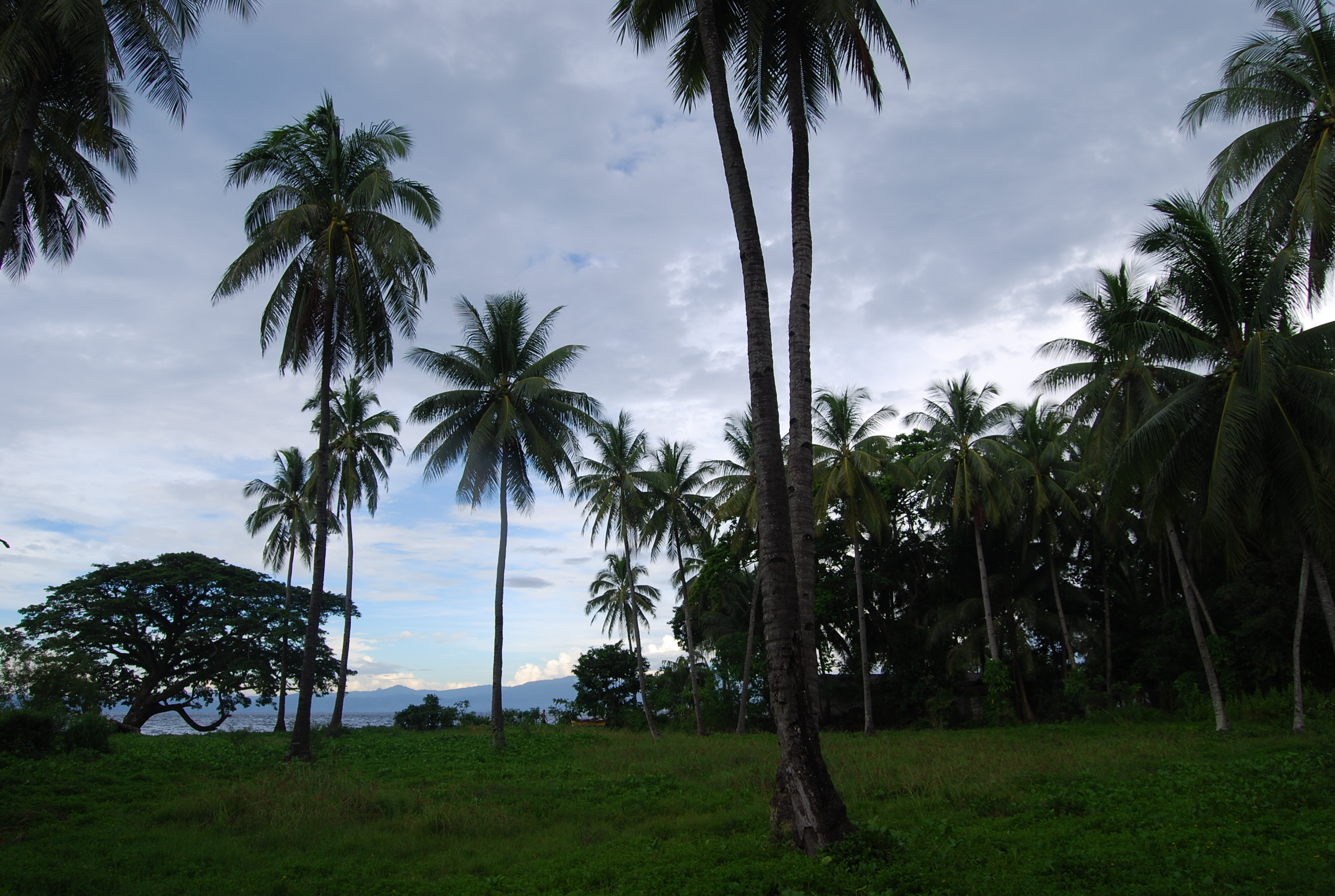
Coconuts and other Crops

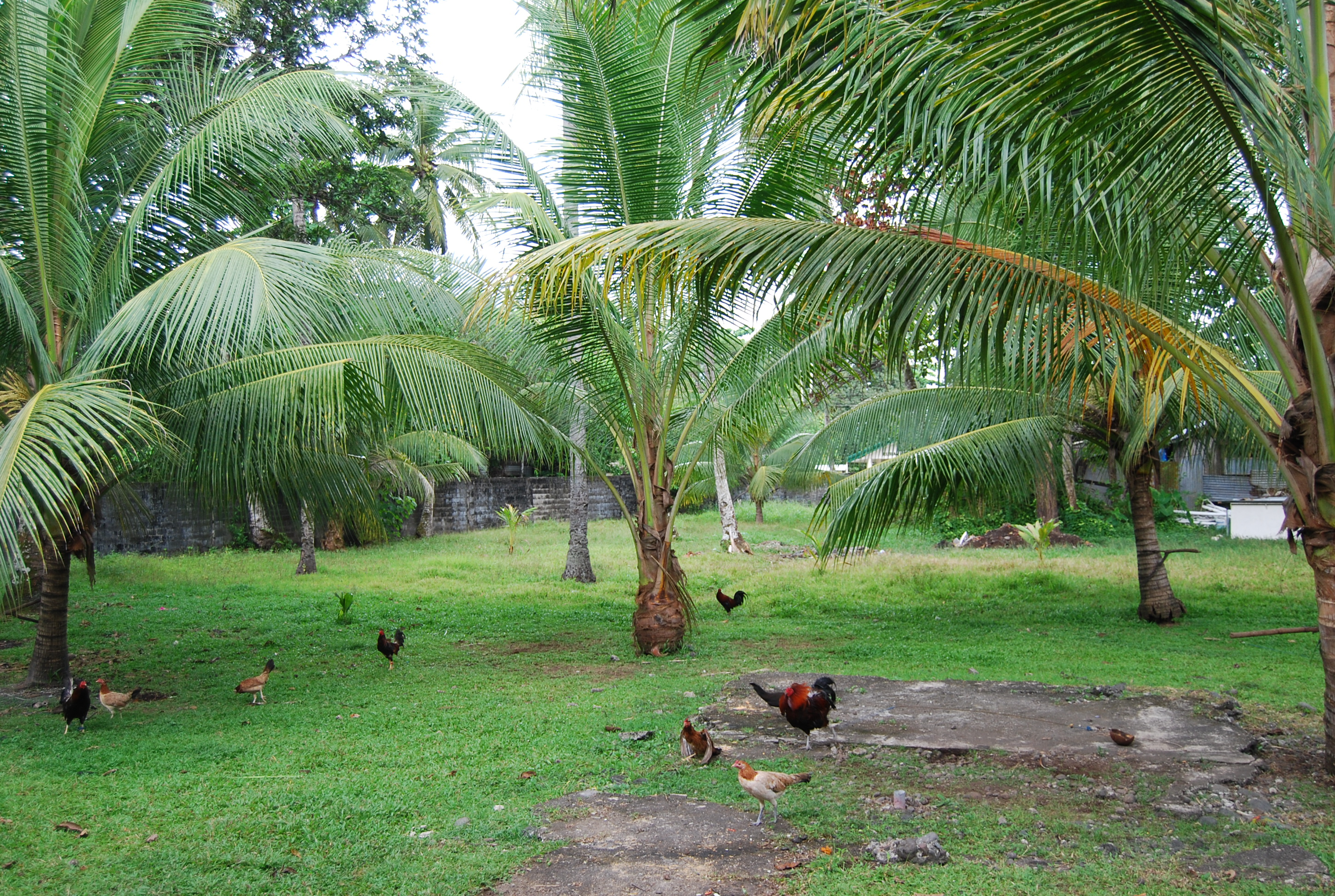
Poultry

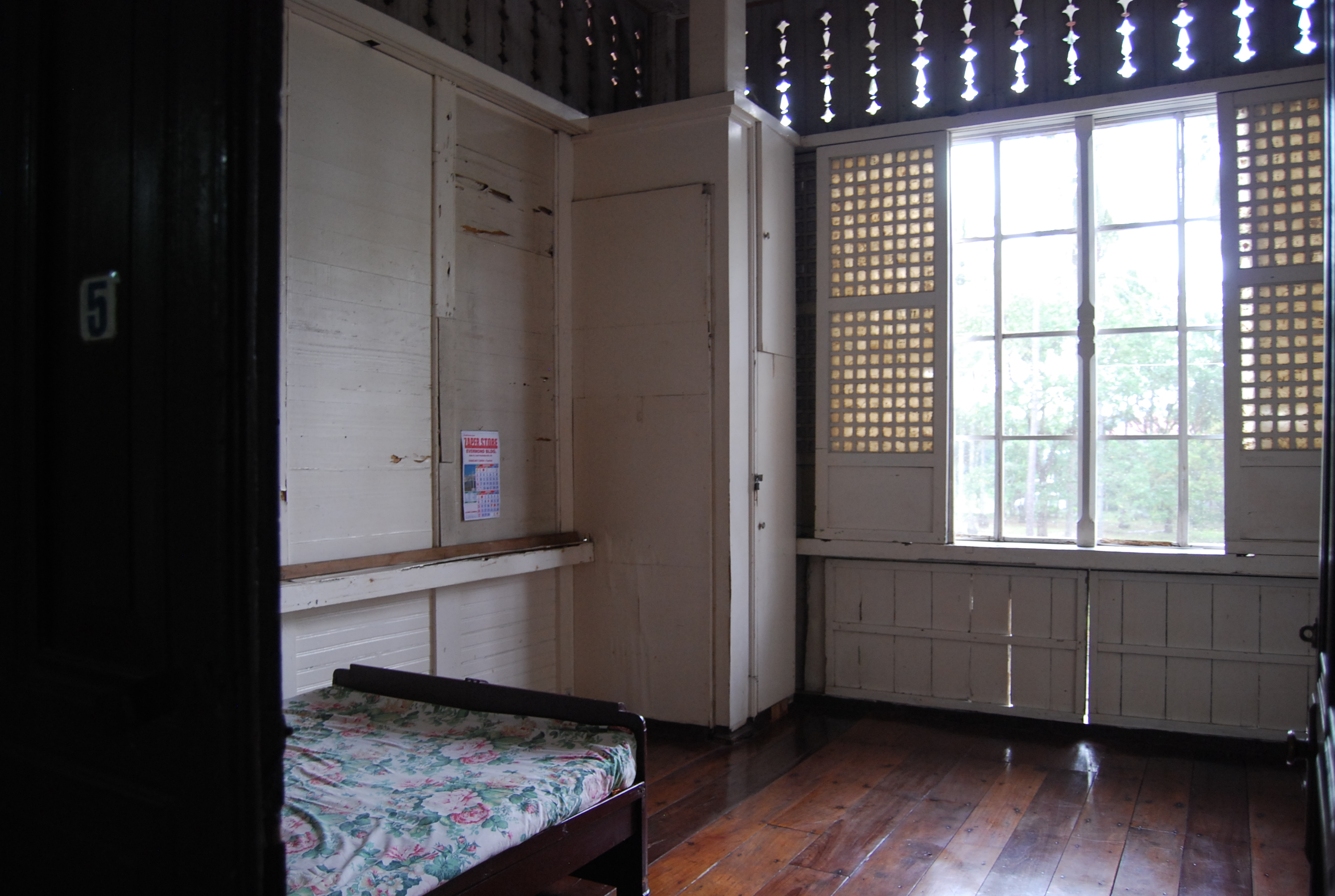
Guest Room 1

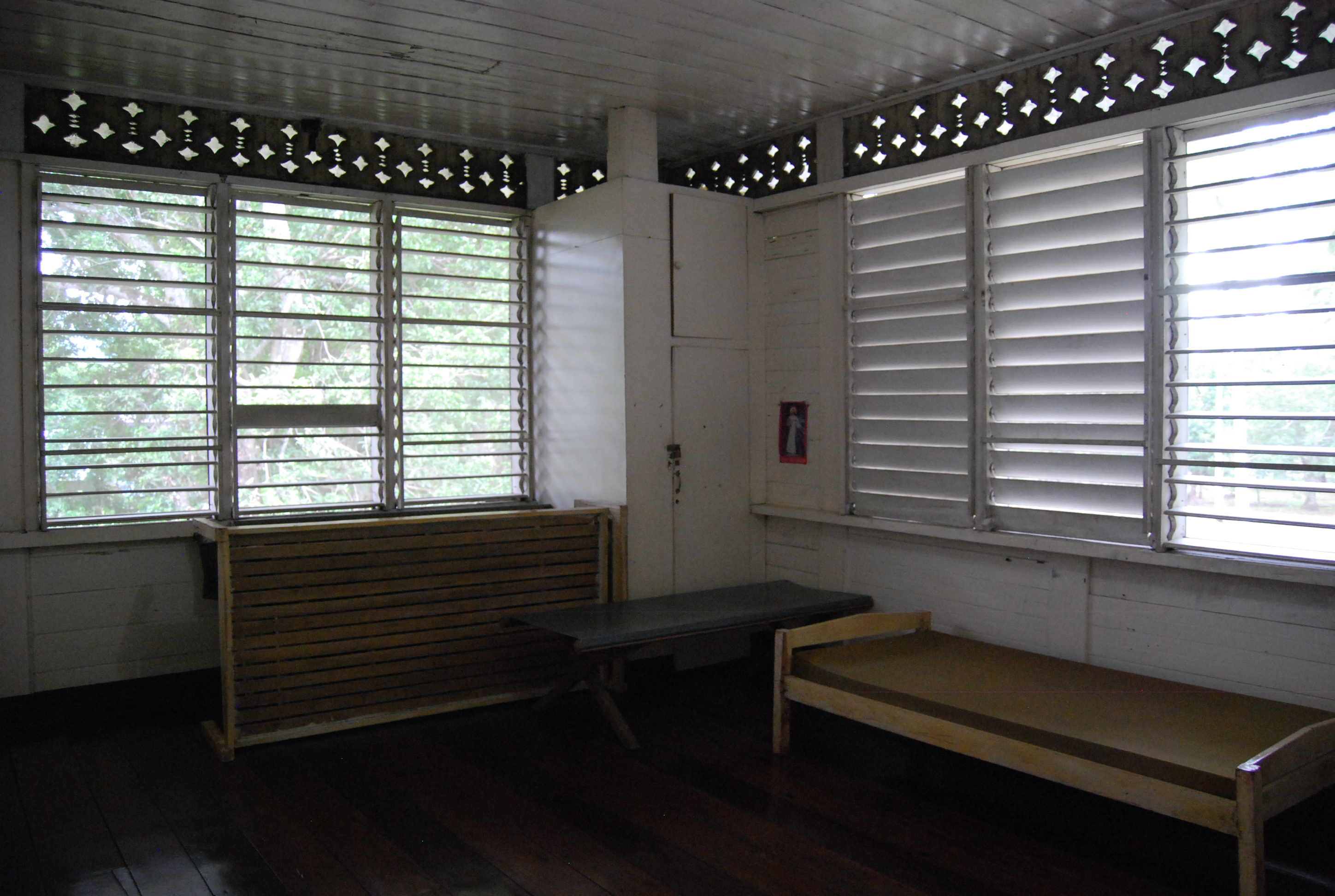
Guest Room 2

As of the present days, the house is surrounded with coconut and poultry which are used as sources of income for the maintenance of the house according to Raul "Jojo" Pelaez-Soriano, 4th generation descendant of Gregorio Pelaez, Sr. He also said that some of the antique items were transferred to Manila for safekeeping and for exhibits purposes. Old photos were also transferred to Mapawa, Cugman, Cagayan de Oro where one of the houses owned by the Pelaez is built.

Other sources of income for the house maintenance are also from some of the properties of the Pelaez which are the Duka Bay Resort and Alibuag Spring which is both located in the locality of Medina.

== See also ==
- Ancestral houses of the Philippines
