= Legislative districts of Misamis Occidental =

Legislative district of the Philippines

The legislative districts of Misamis Occidental are the representations of the province of Misamis Occidental in the various national legislatures of the Philippines. The province is currently represented in the lower house of the Congress of the Philippines through its first and second congressional districts.

== History ==
Prior to gaining separate representation, areas now under the jurisdiction of Misamis Occidental were represented under the historical Misamis Province (1907–1931).

The approval of Act No. 3537 on November 2, 1929, split the old province into Misamis Occidental and Misamis Oriental, and provided the new provinces separate representations in the Philippine Assembly. The new province of Misamis Occidental first elected its own representative in the 1931 elections. It also remained part of the eleventh senatorial district which elected two out of the 24-member upper house of the Philippine Legislature when senators were still elected from territory-based districts (1916–1935).

During the Second World War, the Province of Misamis Occidental sent two delegates to the National Assembly of the Japanese-sponsored Second Philippine Republic: one was an ex officio member, while the other was elected through a provincial assembly of KALIBAPI members during the Japanese occupation of the Philippines. Upon the restoration of the Philippine Commonwealth in 1945 the province retained its pre-war lone district.

Even after receiving their own city charters, Ozamiz, Tangub and Oroquieta remained part of the representation of the Province of Misamis Occidental by virtue of Section 89 of Republic Act No. 321 (June 19, 1948), Section 88 of Republic Act No. 5131 (June 17, 1967), and Section 106 of Republic Act No. 5518 (June 21, 1969), respectively.

Misamis Occidental was represented in the Interim Batasang Pambansa as part of Region X from 1978 to 1984. The province returned one representative, elected at large, to the Regular Batasang Pambansa in 1984.

Under the new Constitution which was proclaimed on February 11, 1987, the province was reapportioned into two congressional districts; each elected its member to the restored House of Representatives starting that same year.

== 1st District ==
- City: Oroquieta
- Municipalities: Aloran, Baliangao, Calamba, Concepcion, Jimenez, Lopez Jaena, Panaon, Plaridel, Sapang Dalaga
- Population (2024): 276,944

Period	Representative
8th Congress; 1987–1992	Julio H. Ozamiz
9th Congress; 1992–1995	Percival B. Catane (Note: Proclaimed winner of 1998 election, but died on July 15, 1998, before the opening of the 11th Congress. Seat deemed vacant on July 30, 1998, by House of Representatives Electoral Tribunal, and remained so until the end of the 11th Congress.)
10th Congress; 1995–1998	Percival B. Catane
11th Congress; 1998–2001	vacant
12th Congress; 2001–2004	Ernie D. Clarete
13th Congress; 2004–2007	Ernie D. Clarete
14th Congress; 2007–2010	Marina P. Clarete
15th Congress; 2010–2013	Atty. Jorge T. Almonte
16th Congress; 2013–2016	Atty. Jorge T. Almonte
17th Congress; 2016–2019	Atty. Jorge T. Almonte
18th Congress; 2019–2022	Engr. Diego C. Ty
19th Congress; 2022–2025	Jason P. Almonte

== 2nd District ==
- Cities: Ozamiz, Tangub
- Municipalities: Bonifacio, Clarin, Don Victoriano, Sinacaban, Tudela
- Population (2024): 346,320

Period	Representative
8th Congress; 1987–1992	Hilarion J. Ramiro, Jr.
9th Congress; 1992–1995	Hilarion J. Ramiro, Jr.
10th Congress; 1995–1998	Herminia M. Ramiro
11th Congress; 1998–2001	Hilarion J. Ramiro, Jr. (Note: Died on January 5, 2001; seat remained vacant until the end of the 11th Congress.)
11th Congress; 1998–2001	vacant
12th Congress; 2001–2004	Herminia M. Ramiro
13th Congress; 2004–2007	Herminia M. Ramiro
14th Congress; 2007–2010	Herminia M. Ramiro
15th Congress; 2010–2013	Engr. Loreto Leo S. Ocampos
16th Congress; 2013–2016	Atty. Henry S. Oaminal
17th Congress; 2016–2019	Atty. Henry S. Oaminal
18th Congress; 2019–2022	Atty. Henry S. Oaminal
19th Congress; 2022–2025	Sancho Fernando F. Oaminal

== Lone District (defunct) ==
- includes the cities of Ozamiz (chartered 1948), Tangub (chartered 1967) and Oroquieta (chartered 1969)

Period	Representative
9th Philippine Legislature; 1931–1934	José Ozámiz y Fortich
10th Philippine Legislature; 1934–1935	José Ozámiz y Fortich
1st National Assembly; 1935–1938	José Ozámiz y Fortich
2nd National Assembly; 1938–1941	José Ozámiz y Fortich
1st Commonwealth Congress; 1945	Eugenio Stuart Del Rosario
1st Congress; 1946–1949	Porfirio G. Villarin
2nd Congress; 1949–1953	Porfirio G. Villarin
3rd Congress; 1953–1957	William L. Chiongbian (Note: Prematurely proclaimed winner of 1961 election and took oath of office as member of 5th Congress, but did not assume seat. Proclamation later voided by the Supreme Court.)
4th Congress; 1957–1961	William L. Chiongbian
5th Congress; 1961–1965	vacant
5th Congress; 1961–1965	Guillermo C. Sambo (Note: Declared rightful winner of 1961 election by the Supreme Court; assumed office in 1962.)
6th Congress; 1965–1969	William L. Chiongbian
7th Congress; 1969–1972	William L. Chiongbian

== At-Large (defunct) ==
=== 1943-1944 ===
Period	Representative
National Assembly; 1943–1944	Rufino Jaca Abadíez
National Assembly; 1943–1944	P.M. Stuart del Rosario (ex officio)

=== 1984-1986 ===
Period	Representative
Regular Batasang Pambansa; 1984–1986	Henry A. Regalado

== See also ==
- Legislative districts of Misamis
