= Plaridel, Misamis Occidental =

Municipality in Misamis Occidental, Philippines

Plaridel
- Municipality
- Municipality of Plaridel
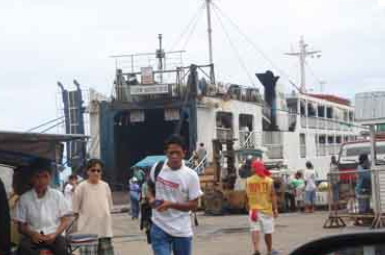
- Port of Plaridel

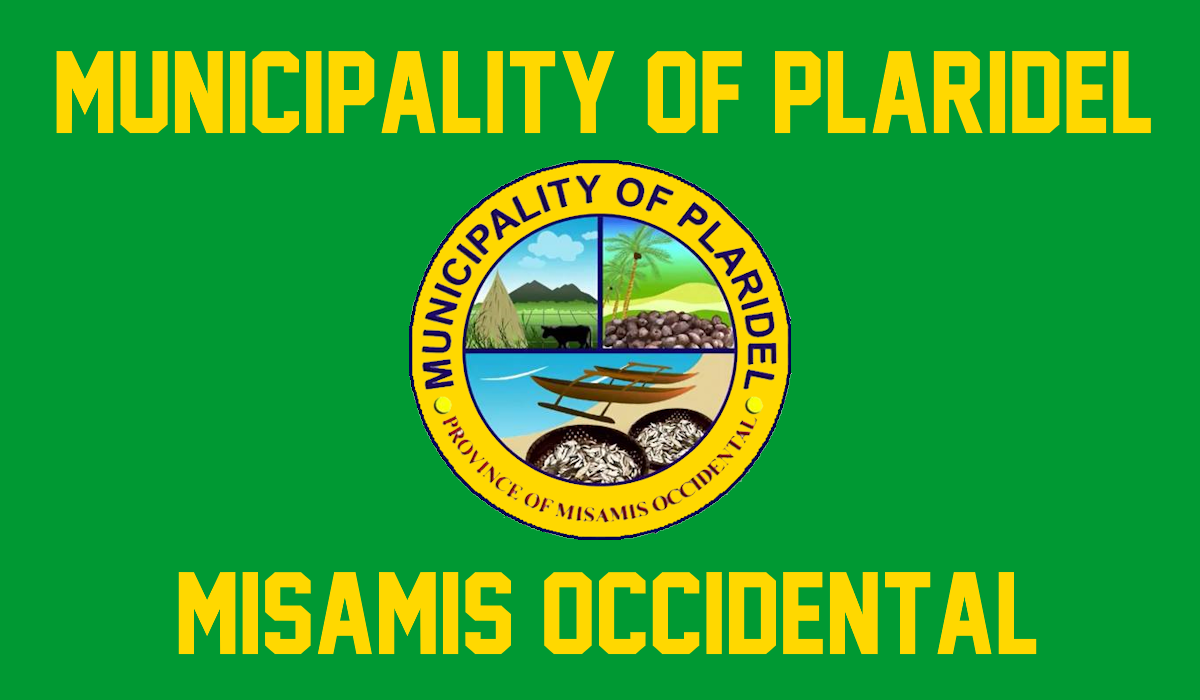
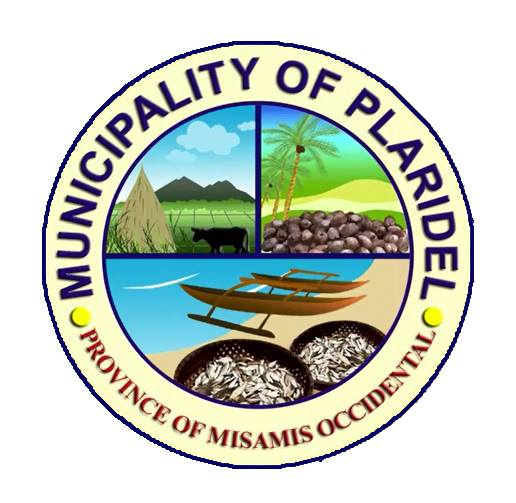
- Flag Seal

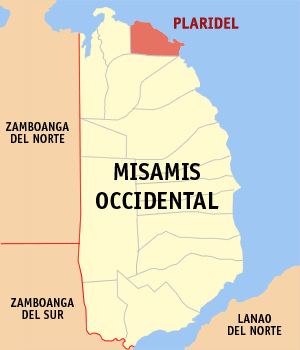
- Map of Misamis Occidental with Plaridel highlighted
- Interactive map of Plaridel
- Location within the Philippines
- Coordinates: 8°37′17″N 123°42′36″E
- Country: Philippines
- Region: Northern Mindanao
- Province: Misamis Occidental
- District: 1st district
- Founded: 1907
- Named for: Pen name of Marcelo H. del Pilar
- Barangays: 33 (see Barangays)

Government
  - Type: Sangguniang Bayan
  - Mayor: Gadwin E. Handumon
  - Vice Mayor: Neite O. Gornez (ASPIN)
  - Representative: Jason P. Almonte (NP)
  - Municipal Council: Members: Jose H. Enguito Jr.; Marilou V. Yap; Henry M. Bulawin; Myra L. Pluma; Recardo P. Magsalay; Gerald G. Tatad; Severino E. Maquiling; Ambrocio D. Cinches
  - Electorate: 31,206 voters (2025)

Area
  - Total: 80.00 km^{2} (30.89 sq mi)
- Elevation: 9.0 m (29.5 ft)
- Highest elevation: 91 m (299 ft)
- Lowest elevation: 0 m (0 ft)

Population (2024 census)
  - Total: 40,321
  - Density: 504.0/km^{2} (1,305/sq mi)
  - Households: 10,174

Economy
  - Income class: 1st municipal income class
  - Poverty incidence: 27.91% (2023)
  - Revenue: ₱ 217 million (2024)
  - Assets: ₱ 462.8 million (2024)
  - Expenditure: ₱ 205.8 million (2024)
  - Liabilities: ₱ 64.57 million (2024)

Service provider
  - Electricity: Misamis Occidental 1 Electric Cooperative (MOELCI 1)
- Time zone: UTC+8 (PST)
- ZIP code: 7209
- PSGC: 1004212000
- IDD : area code: +63 (0)88
- Native languages: Subanon; Cebuano; Tagalog
- Website: www.asensoplaridelmisocc.gov.ph

Plaridel, officially the Municipality of Plaridel (Cebuano: Lungsod sa Plaridel; Tagalog: Bayan ng Plaridel), is a municipality in the province of Misamis Occidental, Philippines. According to the 2024 census, it has a population of 40,321 people.

== History ==
The Municipal Government of Plaridel was one of the original towns of the Province of Misamis before it was divided into two (2) provinces (Oriental & Occidental) under Legislative Act. No. 3537 passed November 2, 1929.

The Subanon people, also known as Suban-on, Subanons or Subanens, were the original settlers of the town. They cultivated vast lands along Langaran River, from the word “Langanan”, the local term for “delay”, because of its circuitous, winding route that traverses many kilometers. This river was the highway by which people travelled on to reach the different settlements located along the riverbanks. Tales have it that the first Spaniard who arrived in one of the riverbank settlements asked what the name of the place was. Thinking that the Spaniard was asking for the name of the river, the settlers answered, “Langanan”.

The Spaniard found it hard to pronounce and instead uttered “Langaran.” Langaran retained its territory by 1903 when the number of municipalities in the then-undivided Misamis decreased through Act No. 951, issued on October 21.

Langaran's name was changed to Plaridel by the Philippine Legislature Act No. 2390 enacted on February 28, 1914. Eventually, several municipalities were carved out of Plaridel, these being Sapang Dalaga, Concepcion, Lopez Jaena, and Calamba.

== Geography ==
Plaridel is situated at the northern portion of Misamis Occidental. It is bounded by three municipalities: Baliangao to the north, Lopez Jaena to the south, and Calamba to the west. The Bohol Sea cradles Plaridel to the east. It is composed of thirty-three (33) barangays with a total area of 8,000 hectares.

It is located between the major cities of Ozamiz (67 km) and Dipolog (68 km) of Zamboanga del Norte. Plaridel can be reached from Manila or Cebu City by plane through these cities. It can also be reached by boat from Manila or Cebu to Ozamiz, Dipolog, or even directly to Plaridel through the Port of Plaridel. A passenger boat (Lite Shipping) travels to Cebu City every Tuesday, Thursday, and Sunday, with stops in Siquijor and Tagbilaran, Bohol.

It has an average elevation of 23 metres (75 ft) above sea level with undulating terrain. A creek is located on the western side of the area that flows to Lobog River.

=== Land use, topography and slope ===
Plaridel is suited for intensive agriculture since 51% of the land area is level to gently sloping. Rolling hills are found at the southern portion extending to the boundaries of Calamba and Lopez Jaena. The existing general land use of Plaridel are classified into: Built-up, Agricultural, Timberland, Nipaland, special uses and other uses such as Riparian Zone, Cemeteries, Roads and Streets, Water Bodies. Of the total land area of the municipality, agricultural area has the biggest chunk; it has 7,385 hectares or about 92% of the municipal land area. Built up in most barangays are concentrated in the barangays of Northern Poblacion, Southern Poblacion, Southern Looc, Looc Proper, Eastern Looc, and Lao Proper, and along major roads and thoroughfares. The total built-up area of the 33 barangays comprises about 4%. Timberland or Mangrove areas are concentrated at the southern and northern boundaries of the municipality.

=== Climate ===
Climate data for Plaridel, Misamis Occidental
Month	Jan	Feb	Mar	Apr	May	Jun	Jul	Aug	Sep	Oct	Nov	Dec	Year
Mean daily maximum °C (°F)	28 (82)	28 (82)	29 (84)	31 (88)	31 (88)	30 (86)	30 (86)	30 (86)	30 (86)	30 (86)	29 (84)	28 (82)	30 (85)
Mean daily minimum °C (°F)	23 (73)	23 (73)	23 (73)	23 (73)	24 (75)	24 (75)	24 (75)	24 (75)	24 (75)	24 (75)	24 (75)	23 (73)	24 (74)
Average precipitation mm (inches)	69 (2.7)	44 (1.7)	37 (1.5)	29 (1.1)	87 (3.4)	137 (5.4)	131 (5.2)	141 (5.6)	143 (5.6)	134 (5.3)	68 (2.7)	53 (2.1)	1,073 (42.3)
Average rainy days	9.9	7.6	7.4	8.1	21.6	26.5	26.4	26.6	25.8	24.3	15.1	10.4	209.7
Source: Meteoblue

=== Barangays ===
Plaridel is politically subdivided into 33 barangays. Each barangay consists of puroks while some have sitios.

- Agunod
- Bato
- Buena Voluntad
- Calaca-an
- Cartagena Proper
- Catarman
- Cebulin
- Clarin
- Danao
- Deboloc
- Divisoria
- Eastern Looc
- Ilisan
- Katipunan
- Kauswagan
- Lao Proper
- Lao Santa Cruz
- Looc Proper
- Mamanga Daku
- Mamanga Gamay
- Mangidkid
- New Cartagena
- New Look
- Northern Poblacion
- Panalsalan
- Puntod
- Quirino
- Santa Cruz
- Southern Looc
- Southern Poblacion
- Tipolo
- Unidos
- Usocan

== Demographics ==
Population census of Plaridel

Year	Pop.	±% p.a.
1903	11,318	—
1918	12,211	+0.51%
1939	21,905	+2.82%
1948	15,072	−4.07%
1960	18,503	+1.72%
1970	21,627	+1.57%
1975	22,052	+0.39%
1980	26,060	+3.40%

Year	Pop.	±% p.a.
1990	28,824	+1.01%
1995	29,134	+0.20%
2000	29,279	+0.11%
2007	33,073	+1.69%
2010	35,251	+2.35%
2015	38,900	+1.89%
2020	39,840	+0.50%
2024	40,321	+0.29%

Source: Philippine Statistics Authority

In the 2024 census, the population of Plaridel, Misamis Occidental, was 40,321 people, with a density of 500 inhabitants per square kilometre or 1,300 inhabitants per square mile.

== Economy ==
Poverty incidence of Plaridel (%)

Source: Philippine Statistics Authority

Like other municipalities in the province, Plaridel's economy depends on agriculture. Coconut has the biggest area with more than 6,000 hectares, followed by other crops such as banana, corn, and fruit trees. Root crops, such as sweet potato and cassava, are cultivated in the municipality.

Rice is ranked as the second in the municipality and the province in terms of area planted, but ranked first in terms of productivity. Rice are harvested 5 times in 2 years with a yield of 6-6.5MT/ha.

Unlike other municipalities in the province, Plaridel is a member of the League of Organic Agriculture Municipalities (LOAM) in the Philippines. It grows organic crops and rice is farmed using rice-duck farming technology, balanced fertilization, and the use of vermi fertilizers.

The municipality of Plaridel has a poverty incidence of 37.4. This is mainly due to insufficient income derived from agriculture and fisheries. Plaridel has an average landholding of 1.5 hectares/household.

== Government ==
=== Elected officials ===
Members of the Municipal Council (2025-2028)

- Municipal Mayor: Gadwin E. Handumon
- Municipal Vice Mayor: Neite O. Gornez
- Congressman (1st District): Jason P. Almonte
- SB Members:
  - Jose H. Enguito Jr.
  - Marilou V. Yap
  - Henry M. Bulawin
  - Myra L. Pluma
  - Recardo P. Magsalay
  - Gerald G. Tatad
  - Severino E. Maquiling
  - Ambrocio D. Cinches
- SK Federation President
  - Rojim R. Banguis (2020-2023)
  - Kenneth Jester P. Haim (2023-2025)
- ABC President
  - Lucita M. Aviles, Ed.D (2018-2023)
  - Rolito P. Lorejo (2023-2025)
- IPMR
  - (Vacant)

== Tourism ==
The Bawbawon Islands, located in Barangay Panalsalan, is a group of islets in the shape of a broken necklace evenly scattered on an area facing the Mindanao Sea. It has an aggregate land area of 23.00 hectares or only 24% of the total land area embraced by the municipality, and is frequently visited by locals and tourists.

It is accessible by boat via the Plaridel Port or at Sitio Baybay in Barangay Panalsalan with minimal fares. There is also an existing concrete viaduct which visitors may use when entering the island, located at the Bawbawon Entrance at Baybay-Panalsalan.

== Infrastructure ==
=== Transportation ===
Plaridel's total road network covers 164 kilometres (102 mi), of which 85% are barangay roads, as well as 42.56 kilometres (26.45 mi) of roads of gravel and earth type. 100% of the National Highway is paved with asphalt, 13.57% of the Provincial Roads are paved with concrete, 11.24% of the Municipal Road is paved with concrete, and 37.43% barangay roads/farm-to-market roads.

The municipality itself has its own seaport with a regular trip to Siquijor, Tagbilaran, Cebu and vice versa, which caters to passengers only. The Philippine Ports Authority - Port Management Office Misamis Occidental/Ozamiz manages the port and has an ongoing construction project worth more than a hundred million pesos which covers the expansion and raising up of the port area, designed to cater larger vessels to dock and a passenger terminal.

=== Water supply ===
Plaridel is served by the Plaridel Waterworks Office, an LGU-run enterprise that caters to Twenty (20) barangays, namely: Northern Poblacion, Southern Poblacion, Lao Proper, Looc Proper, Eastern Looc, Southern Looc, Mamanga Daku, Kauswagan, Santa Cruz, Lao Santa Cruz, Usocan, Clarin, Tipolo, Unidos, Mangidkid, New Look, Catarman, Puntod, Danao, and Calacaan. It has two (2) pumping stations at Barangay Mamanga Daku and one pumping station at Tipolo and Unidos. It has a total of 3,500 consumers.

Barangays Panalsalan, Katipunan, Cartagena Proper, New Cartagena, Cebulin, Ilisan, Mamanga Gamay, Divisoria, Buena Voluntad, Deboloc, Quirino, Agunod, and Bato has its own Level II and III systems, making Plaridel to be the first municipality in the province to have a 100% performance on the provision of potable water to all thirty (33) barangays.

Based on actual survey of households conducted by the Municipal Health Office, the actual number of households served by the different water systems all over the municipality reaches 6,929 or 84% of the total household population.

=== Power supply ===
Plaridel set the record as the first municipality that has 100% energization level in terms of barangay. It has total connections of 4,333 all throughout the municipality, 3,933 of which are residential connections, 111 commercial, 23 industrial, 7 streetlights, 130 for public buildings and 129 connections assigned to Barangay Power Association (BAPA). It has an average consumption of 215,270 KWH/Month for the year 2000.

Recently, a standby Power Generation Plant is now established at Barangay Map-an, Panaon by the Kings Energy Group (KEG) in case the supply of energy will drop due to prevailing circumstances.

=== Communication ===
PLDT, Inc. was established in the municipality in 1994 and is managed by Paglaum Multi-Purpose Cooperative (PMPC). It covers 12 barangays with a total of 178 consumers including commercial establishments and churches. It accommodates domestic and international calls, and is also the main internet service provider in the municipality.

Cellular Phone Service is also available for Smart, Globe and Sun Cellular Phone subscribers. There are six repeater towers within the urban and rural area.

Plaridel has a post office. Telecom, a government-owned telegraphic facility, offers telegram communications.

The Philippine National Police has a radio messaging system covering the province with a repeater at Barangay Mamanga Daku. Municipal officials and members of the Association of Barangay Captains use it with handheld radios.

=== Medical facilities ===
There are two privately owned medical institutions in the municipality, the ten bed Tan Ho Medical Clinic and the 25 bed St. Augustine Hospital.

The Local Government Unit operates the Plaridel Community Hospital, a program authorized by former Mayor Diego Ty.

== Education ==
The Provincial Manpower Training Center at Barangay Panalsalan provides vocational training for the province and students coming from Zamboanga del Norte.
