= Misamis Occidental Provincial Board =

Legislative body of the province of Misamis Occidental, Philippines

Misamis Occidental Provincial Board Hunta Probinsyal sa Kasadpang Misamis Sangguniang Panlalawigan ng Misamis Occidental

Type
- Type: Unicameral
- Term limits: 3 terms (9 years)

Leadership
- Presiding Officer: Rowena L. Gutierrez, Asenso Pinoy since June 30, 2022

Structure
- Seats: 13 board members 1 ex officio presiding officer
- Political groups: Asenso Pinoy (10) TBD (1) Nonpartisan (2)
- Length of term: 3 years
- Authority: Local Government Code of the Philippines

Elections
- Voting system: Multiple non-transferable vote (regular members); Indirect election (ex officio members)
- Last election: May 12, 2025
- Next election: May 15, 2028

Meeting place
- Misamis Occidental Provincial Capitol, Oroquieta

Website
- sp.misocc.gov.ph

The Misamis Occidental Provincial Board is the Sangguniang Panlalawigan (provincial legislature) of the Philippine province of Misamis Occidental.

The districts used in appropriation of members is coextensive with the legislative districts of Misamis Oriental.

Aside from the regular members, the board also includes the provincial federation presidents of the Liga ng mga Barangay (ABC, from its old name "Association of Barangay Captains"), the Sangguniang Kabataan (SK, youth councils) and the Philippine Councilors League (PCL).

== Apportionment ==
Elections	Seats per district		Ex officio seats	Total seats
Elections	1st	2nd	Ex officio seats	Total seats
2010–present	5	5	3	13

== List of members ==
=== Current members ===
These are the members after the 2025 local elections and 2023 barangay and SK elections:

- Vice Governor: Rowena L. Gutierrez (Asenso Pinoy)

Seat	Board member	Party	Start of term	End of term
1st district	Alejandro J. Guantero Jr.	Asenso Pinoy	June 30, 2022	June 30, 2028
1st district	Winston V. Catane	Asenso Pinoy	June 30, 2019	June 30, 2028
1st district	Rosanne Marie L. Paylaga-Lim	Asenso Pinoy	June 30, 2019	June 30, 2028
1st district	Donna R. Iyog	Asenso Pinoy	June 30, 2022	June 30, 2028
1st district	Agnes C. Villanueva	Asenso Pinoy	June 30, 2019	June 30, 2028
2nd district	Calven Tito C. Decina	Asenso Pinoy	June 30, 2019	June 30, 2028
2nd district	Eduardo C. Cebedo	Asenso Pinoy	June 30, 2022	June 30, 2028
2nd district	Heinjie B. Estaño	Asenso Pinoy	June 30, 2019	June 30, 2028
2nd district	Nemesio DP. Lahaylahay	Asenso Pinoy	June 30, 2019	June 30, 2028
2nd district	Jerry R. Cuizon	Asenso Pinoy	June 30, 2022	June 30, 2028
ABC	Salvador C. Canlas Jr. (Ozamiz)	Nonpartisan	September 1, 2023	
PCL	TBD			June 30, 2028
SK	Clara Mie V. Villanueva (Clarin)	Nonpartisan	January 1, 2023	

=== Vice governor ===
Election year	Name	Party	Ref.
2016	Aurora Virginia M. Almonte	Liberal	
2019	Aurora Virginia M. Almonte	Nacionalista	
2022	Rowena L. Gutierrez	PDP–Laban	
2025	Rowena L. Gutierrez	Asenso Pinoy	

=== 1st district ===
- Population (2024):

Election year	Member (party)	Member (party)	Member (party)	Member (party)	Member (party)	Ref.
2016	Zaldy G. Daminar (NUP)	Pablo Stephen C. Ty (NUP)	Richard T. Centino (Liberal)	Lei M. Blanco (Liberal)	Roy M. Yap (Akbayan)	
2019	Ruvy V. Ala (Nacionalista)	Winston V. Catane (Nacionalista)	Roseanne Marie L. Paylaga-Lim (Nacionalista)	Lei M. Blanco (Nacionalista)	Agnes C. Villanueva (Nacionalista)	
2022	Alejandro J. Guantero, Jr. (Asenso Pinoy)	Winston V. Catane (Asenso Pinoy)	Roseanne Marie L. Paylaga-Lim (Asenso Pinoy)	Donna R. Iyog (Asenso Pinoy)	Agnes C. Villanueva (Asenso Pinoy)	
2025	Alejandro J. Guantero, Jr. (Asenso Pinoy)	Winston V. Catane (Asenso Pinoy)	Roseanne Marie L. Paylaga-Lim (Asenso Pinoy)	Donna R. Iyog (Asenso Pinoy)	Agnes C. Villanueva (Asenso Pinoy)	

=== 2nd district ===
- Population (2024):

Election year	Member (party)	Member (party)	Member (party)	Member (party)	Member (party)	Ref.
2016	Emeterio B. Roa Sr. (NUP)	Octavio O. Parojinog Jr. (NUP)	Tito B. Decina (NUP)	Mena A. Lansing (Independent)	Dan M. Navarro (Independent)	
2019	Emeterio B. Roa, Sr. (Nacionalista)	Nemesio DP. Lahaylahay, Sr. (Nacionalista)	Tito B. Decina (Nacionalista)	Heinjie B. Estaño (Nacionalista)	Elsa F. Navarro (Nacionalista)	
2022	Eduardo C. Cebedo (Asenso Pinoy)	Nemesio DP. Lahaylahay, Sr. (Asenso Pinoy)	Calven Tito C. Decina (PDP–Laban)	Heinjie B. Estaño (Nacionalista)	Jerry R. Cuizon (PDP–Laban)	
2025	Eduardo C. Cebedo (Asenso Pinoy)	Nemesio DP. Lahaylahay, Sr. (Asenso Pinoy)	Calven Tito C. Decina (Asenso Pinoy)	Heinjie B. Estaño (Asenso Pinoy)	Jerry R. Cuizon (Asenso Pinoy)	

==== Philippine Councilors League President ====
These are members representing a group of elected councilors from the three City Councils (Oroquieta, Ozamiz and Tangub) and fourteen Municipal Councils of Misamis Occidental.

Election year	Member (party)	Local council	Ref.
2019	Eduardo "Tata" C. Cebedo (Nacionalista)	Ozamiz	

==== Association of Barangay Councils President ====
These are members representing a group of elected Barangay captains from the 490 Barangay councils of Misamis Occidental.

Election year	Member	Municipality/City	Ref.
2018	Sancho S. Oaminal	Ozamiz	

==== Sangguniang Kabataan Federation President ====
These are members representing a group of elected SK chairpersons from the 490 Barangay youth councils of Misamis Occidental.

Election year	Member	Municipality/City	Ref.
2018	Alyssia Ann D. Pao	Sapang Dalaga	

==== Indigenous People Mandatory Representative ====
Year	Member	Municipality/City	Ref.
2020	Juanidy M. Viña	Concepcion	
