= Medina Foundation College =

Private college in Misamis Occidental, Philippines

Medina Foundation College of Sapang Dalaga
- Saligang Dalubhasaang Medina ng Sapang Dalaga (Filipino)
- Motto: The New and Bright Horizon in Modern Education
- Type: Private, non-sectarian higher education institution
- Established: June 1984; 42 years ago
- Founders: Medina College, Inc.
- Chairman: Rico M. Medina, Sr., M.D.
- President: Eduardo P. De Los Santos
- Location: Jasmine St. Poblacion, Sapang Dalaga, Misamis Occidental, Philippines; 8°32′30″N 123°34′05″E
- Colors: Green and White
- Website: www.mfcollege.com
- Location in Mindanao Location in the Philippines

Medina Foundation College of Sapang Dalaga, Inc. is a private non-sectarian higher education institution run by the Medina College, Inc. in Sapang Dalaga, Misamis Occidental. It was established by Medina College, Inc. in June 1984, exactly two decades after the main campus in Ozamiz City was founded. It is among the other private schools in Misamis Occidental which accommodates higher education programs in arts, elementary and secondary education, business administration, and junior secretarial courses.

== History ==
In June 1963, Medina College was founded in Ozamiz City by Dr. Rico Macan Medina, Sr. and his wife, Dr. Beatriz Crisostomo Medina.

The school became one of the region's leading institutions, especially in the fields of nursing and midwifery. After several years, the school created an expansion program, both for the purpose of accommodating the larger population and to cope with the demands of modern education.

This expansion programme led to the establishment of a second Medina College in June 1984 in Sapang Dalaga, Misamis Occidental. Since then, the school has been catering students from the province and neighboring areas in Zamboanga Peninsula and Northern Mindanao regions.
