= Panaon =

Panaon can refer to

- Panaon Island, an island of the Philippines in the province of Southern Leyte
- Panaon, Misamis Occidental, a municipality on the island of Mindanao, Philippines
