= Misamis Occidental's 1st congressional district =

Legislative district of the Philippines

- Constituency for the House of Representatives of the Philippines
- Location of Misamis Occidental within the Philippines
- Province: Misamis Occidental
- Region: Northern Mindanao
- Population: 275,673 (2024)
- Electorate: 202,347 (2022)
- Major settlements: 10 LGUs: Cities; Oroquieta; Municipalities; Aloran; Baliangao; Calamba; Concepcion; Jimenez; Lopez Jaena; Panaon; Plaridel; Sapang Dalaga
- Area: 1,000.76 km^{2} (386.40 sq mi)

Current constituency
- Created: 1987
- Representative: Jason P. Almonte
- Political party: Nacionalista Party
- Congressional bloc: Majority

Misamis Occidental's 1st congressional district is one of the two congressional districts of the Philippines in the province of Misamis Occidental. It has been represented in the House of Representatives since 1987. The district encompasses the northern half of the province consisting of its capital, Oroquieta, and the municipalities of Aloran, Baliangao, Calamba, Concepcion, Jimenez, Lopez Jaena, Panaon, Plaridel and Sapang Dalaga. It is currently represented in the 20th Congress by Jason P. Almonte of the Nacionalista Party.

== Representation history ==
#	Image	Member	Term of office		Congress	Party	Electoral history	Constituent LGUs
#	Image	Member	Start	End	Congress	Party	Electoral history	Constituent LGUs
=== Misamis Occidental's 1st district for the House of Representatives of the Philippines ===
District created February 2, 1987 from Misamis Occidental's at-large district.
1		Julio H. Ozamiz	June 30, 1987	June 30, 1992	8th	Lakas ng Bansa	Elected in 1987.	1987–present Aloran, Baliangao, Calamba, Concepcion, Jimenez, Lopez Jaena, Oroquieta, Panaon, Plaridel, Sapang Dalaga
2		Atty. Percival B. Catane	June 30, 1992	July 15, 1998	9th	NPC	Elected in 1992.	1987–present Aloran, Baliangao, Calamba, Concepcion, Jimenez, Lopez Jaena, Oroquieta, Panaon, Plaridel, Sapang Dalaga
2		Atty. Percival B. Catane	June 30, 1992	July 15, 1998	10th	Lakas	Re-elected in 1995.	1987–present Aloran, Baliangao, Calamba, Concepcion, Jimenez, Lopez Jaena, Oroquieta, Panaon, Plaridel, Sapang Dalaga
2		Atty. Percival B. Catane	June 30, 1992	July 15, 1998	11th	Lakas	Re-elected in 1998. Died in office.	1987–present Aloran, Baliangao, Calamba, Concepcion, Jimenez, Lopez Jaena, Oroquieta, Panaon, Plaridel, Sapang Dalaga
—	vacant		July 15, 1998	June 30, 2001	11th	—	No special election held to fill vacancy.	1987–present Aloran, Baliangao, Calamba, Concepcion, Jimenez, Lopez Jaena, Oroquieta, Panaon, Plaridel, Sapang Dalaga
3		Atty. Ernie D. Clarete	June 30, 2001	June 30, 2007	12th	Nacionalista	Elected in 2001.	1987–present Aloran, Baliangao, Calamba, Concepcion, Jimenez, Lopez Jaena, Oroquieta, Panaon, Plaridel, Sapang Dalaga
3		Atty. Ernie D. Clarete	June 30, 2001	June 30, 2007	13th	Nacionalista	Re-elected in 2004.	1987–present Aloran, Baliangao, Calamba, Concepcion, Jimenez, Lopez Jaena, Oroquieta, Panaon, Plaridel, Sapang Dalaga
4		Marina P. Clarete	June 30, 2007	June 30, 2010	14th	Nacionalista	Elected in 2007.	1987–present Aloran, Baliangao, Calamba, Concepcion, Jimenez, Lopez Jaena, Oroquieta, Panaon, Plaridel, Sapang Dalaga
5		Atty. Jorge T. Almonte	June 30, 2010	June 30, 2019	15th	Liberal	Elected in 2010.	1987–present Aloran, Baliangao, Calamba, Concepcion, Jimenez, Lopez Jaena, Oroquieta, Panaon, Plaridel, Sapang Dalaga
5		Atty. Jorge T. Almonte	June 30, 2010	June 30, 2019	16th	Liberal	Re-elected in 2013.	1987–present Aloran, Baliangao, Calamba, Concepcion, Jimenez, Lopez Jaena, Oroquieta, Panaon, Plaridel, Sapang Dalaga
5		Atty. Jorge T. Almonte	June 30, 2010	June 30, 2019	17th	Nacionalista	Re-elected in 2016.	1987–present Aloran, Baliangao, Calamba, Concepcion, Jimenez, Lopez Jaena, Oroquieta, Panaon, Plaridel, Sapang Dalaga
6		Engr. Diego C. Ty	June 30, 2019	June 30, 2022	18th	NUP	Elected in 2019.	1987–present Aloran, Baliangao, Calamba, Concepcion, Jimenez, Lopez Jaena, Oroquieta, Panaon, Plaridel, Sapang Dalaga
6		Jason P. Almonte	June 30, 2022	Incumbent	19th	Nacionalista	Elected in 2022.	1987–present Aloran, Baliangao, Calamba, Concepcion, Jimenez, Lopez Jaena, Oroquieta, Panaon, Plaridel, Sapang Dalaga
6		Jason P. Almonte	June 30, 2022	Incumbent	20th	Nacionalista	Re-elected in 2025.	1987–present Aloran, Baliangao, Calamba, Concepcion, Jimenez, Lopez Jaena, Oroquieta, Panaon, Plaridel, Sapang Dalaga

== Election results ==
=== 2025 ===
Candidate	Party	Votes	%
Jason Almonte (incumbent)	Nacionalista Party	122,329	81.08
Roy Yap	National Unity Party	28,542	18.92
Total		150,871	100.00
Valid votes		150,871	91.81
Invalid/blank votes		13,463	8.19
Total votes		164,334	100.00
Registered voters/turnout		200,224	82.08
Nacionalista Party hold			
Source: Commission on Elections

=== 2022 ===
Candidate	Party	Votes	%
Jason Almonte	PDP–Laban	93,732	58.33
Diego Ty (incumbent)	National Unity Party	66,241	41.22
Reynold Yap	Partido Federal ng Pilipinas	710	0.44
Total		160,683	100.00
Total votes		169,444	–
Registered voters/turnout		202,347	83.74
PDP–Laban gain from National Unity Party			
Source: Commission on Elections

=== 2016 ===
2016 Philippine House of Representatives elections
Party	Candidate	Votes	%
Liberal	Jorge Almonte	83,501	69.37%
Nacionalista	Marina Clarete	36,868	30.62%
Total votes		120,369	100.00%

=== 2013 ===
2013 Philippine House of Representatives elections
Party	Candidate	Votes	%	±%
Liberal	Jorge Almonte			
Independent	Franklin Omandam			
Margin of victory				
Rejected ballots				
Turnout				
Liberal hold		Swing		

=== 2010 ===
Candidate	Party	Votes	%
Jorge Almonte	Lakas–Kampi–CMD	62,778	50.61
Ernie Clarete	Nacionalista Party	61,276	49.39
Total		124,054	100.00
Valid votes		124,054	94.65
Invalid/blank votes		7,011	5.35
Total votes		131,065	100.00
Lakas–Kampi–CMD gain from Nacionalista Party			
Source: Commission on Elections

== See also ==
- Legislative districts of Misamis Occidental
