= Aloran =

Municipality in Misamis Occidental, Philippines

- Municipality
- Municipality of Aloran
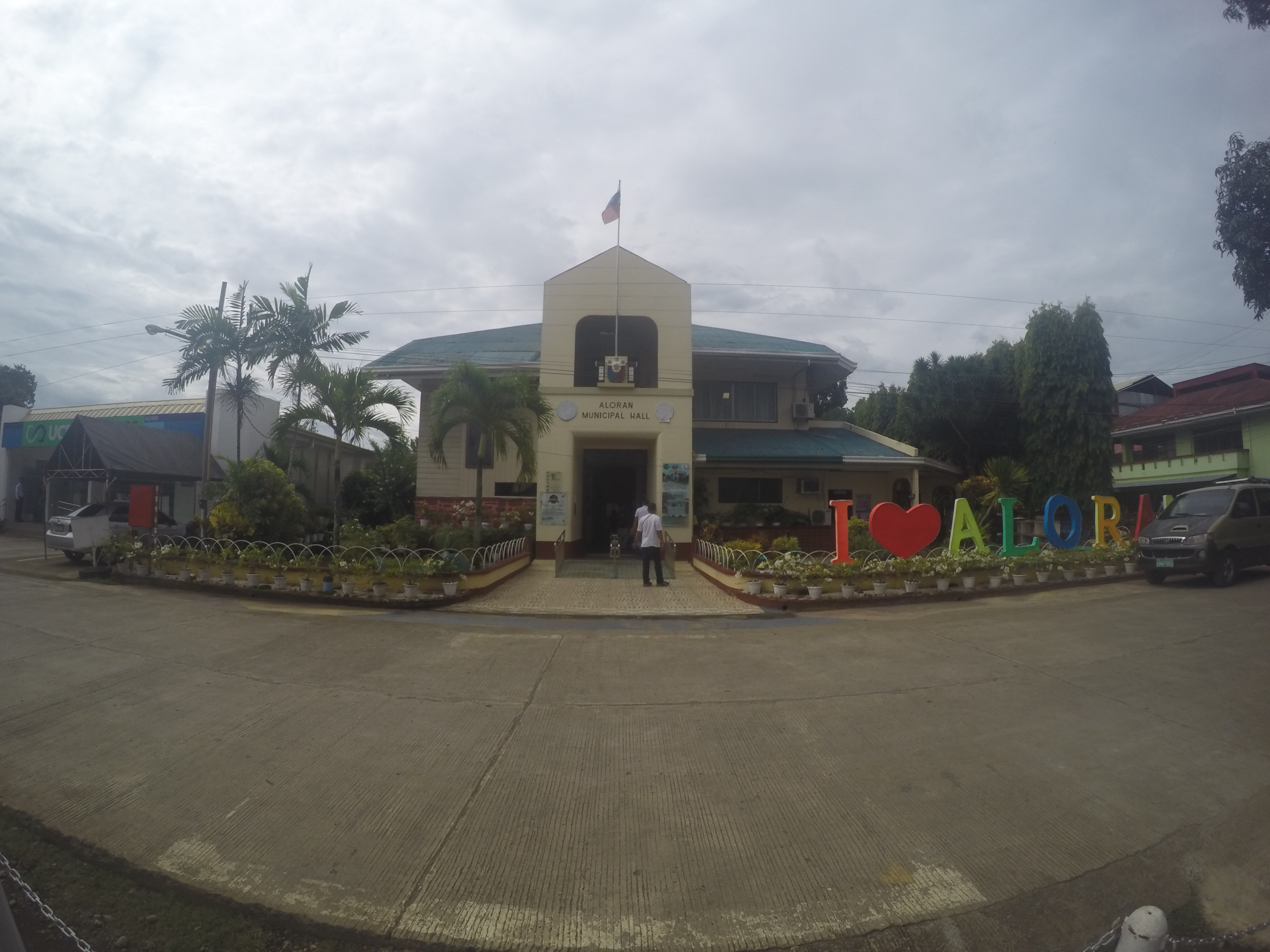
- Municipal hall

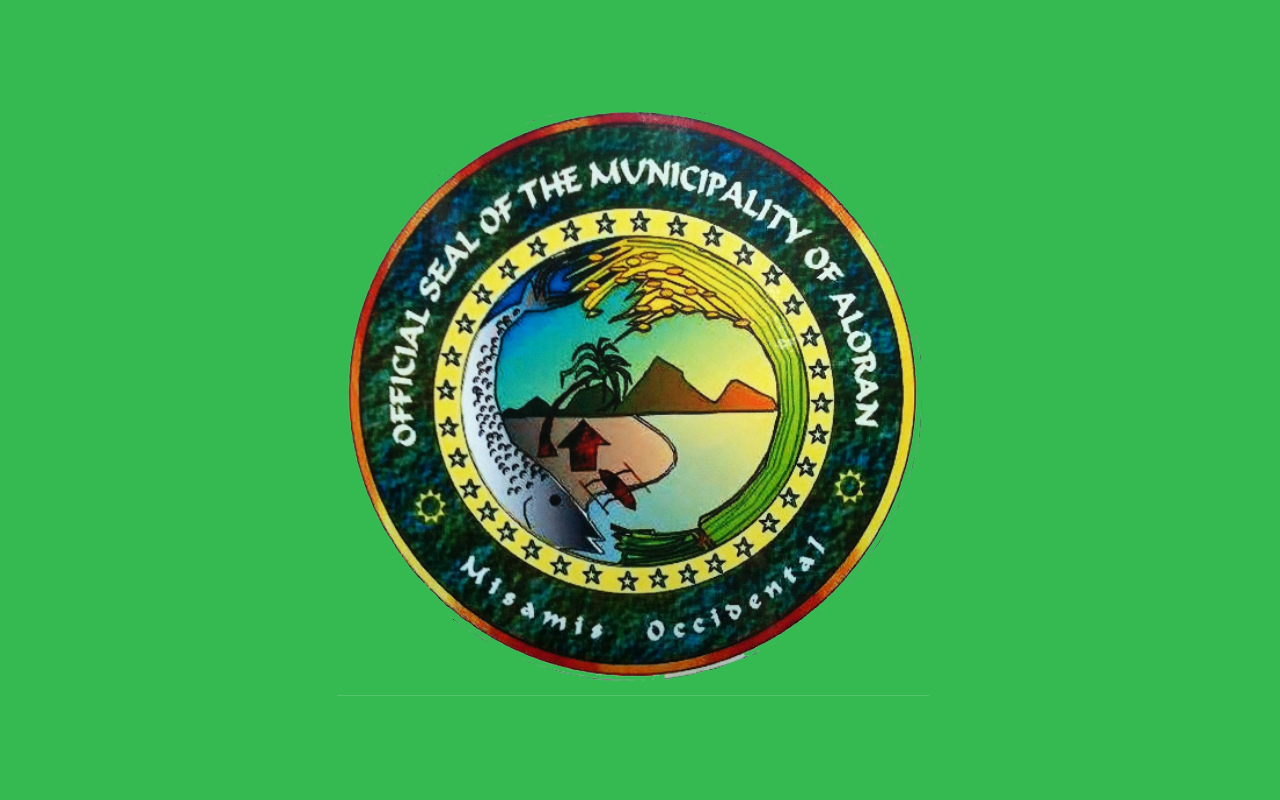
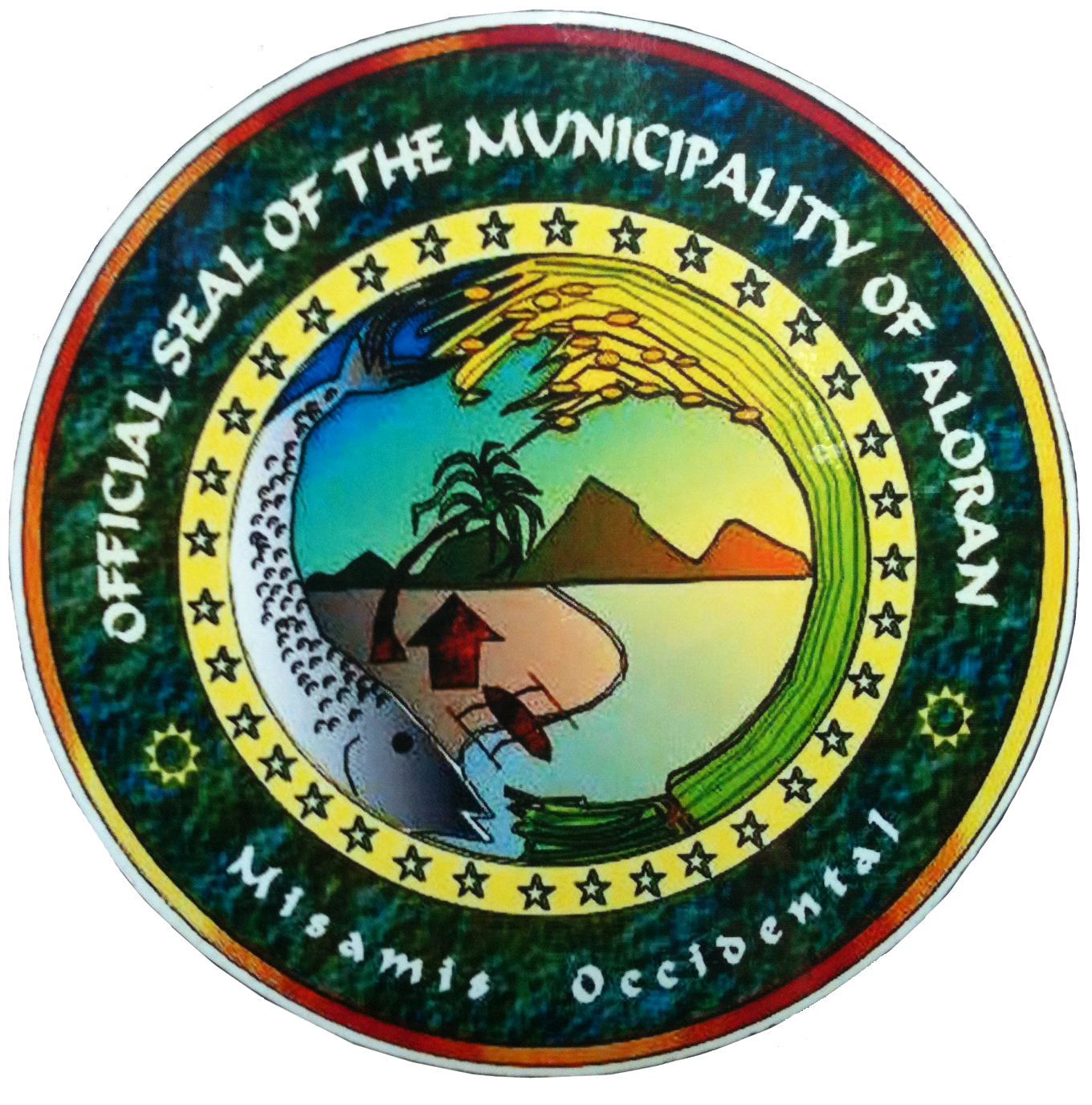
- Flag Seal
- Nickname: Heart of MisOcc
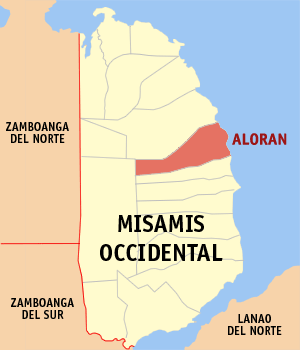
- Map of Misamis Occidental with Aloran highlighted
- Interactive map of Aloran
- Location within the Philippines
- Coordinates: 8°24′53″N 123°49′22″E
- Country: Philippines
- Region: Northern Mindanao
- Province: Misamis Occidental
- District: 1st district
- Founded: January 1, 1917
- Barangays: 38 (see Barangays)

Government
  - Type: Sangguniang Bayan
  - Mayor: Guardson D. Mutia (ASPIN)
  - Vice Mayor: Junipher A. Roa (ASPIN)
  - Representative: Jason P. Almonte (NP)
  - Municipal Council: Members: Remy T. Cawit; Ernie M. Paderanga; Jimmy R. Regalado; Joel D. Tejano; Elias U. Omega; Raul U. Toliao; Alberto L. Paderanga; Saturnina M. Paza
  - Electorate: 20,411 voters (2025)

Area
  - Total: 118.06 km^{2} (45.58 sq mi)
- Elevation: 50 m (160 ft)
- Highest elevation: 303 m (994 ft)
- Lowest elevation: 0 m (0 ft)

Population (2024 census)
  - Total: 28,095
  - Density: 237.97/km^{2} (616.35/sq mi)
  - Households: 6,958

Economy
  - Income class: 3rd municipal income class
  - Poverty incidence: 25.31% (2023)
  - Revenue: ₱ 166.7 million (2024)
  - Assets: ₱ 473.5 million (2024)
  - Expenditure: ₱ 159.4 million (2024)
  - Liabilities: ₱ 159.6 million (2024)

Service provider
  - Electricity: Misamis Occidental 1 Electric Cooperative (MOELCI 1)
- Time zone: UTC+8 (PST)
- ZIP code: 7206
- PSGC: 1004201000
- IDD : area code: +63 (0)88
- Native languages: Subanon; Cebuano; Tagalog
- Website: www.aloranmisocc.gov.ph

Aloran, officially the Municipality of Aloran (Cebuano: Lungsod sa Aloran; Tagalog: Bayan ng Aloran), is a municipality in the province of Misamis Occidental, Philippines. According to the 2024 census, it has a population of 28,095 people.

== History ==
Through Executive Order No. 67, issued by Governor-General Francis Burton Harrison on September 30, 1916, four barrios in Oroquieta were separated and organized into an independent municipality named Aloran, with one of them having the same name as its seat of government. The order became effective at the beginning of 1917.

== Geography ==
=== Barangay ===
Aloran is politically subdivided into 38 barangays. Each barangay consists of puroks while some have sitios.

- Balintonga
- Banisilon
- Burgos
- Calube
- Caputol
- Casusan
- Conat
- Culpan
- Dalisay (poblacion)
- Dullan
- Ibabao (poblacion)
- Tubod
- Labo
- Lawa-an
- Lobogon
- Lumbayao
- Makawa
- Manamong
- Matipaz
- Maular
- Mitazan
- Mohon
- Monterico
- Nabuna
- Palayan
- Pelong
- Ospital (poblacion)
- Roxas
- San Pedro
- Santa Ana
- Sinampongan
- Taguanao
- Tawi-tawi
- Toril
- Tuburan
- Zamora
- Macubon (Sina-ad)
- Tugaya

=== Climate ===
Climate data for Aloran, Misamis Occidental
Month	Jan	Feb	Mar	Apr	May	Jun	Jul	Aug	Sep	Oct	Nov	Dec	Year
Mean daily maximum °C (°F)	28 (82)	28 (82)	29 (84)	31 (88)	31 (88)	30 (86)	30 (86)	30 (86)	30 (86)	30 (86)	29 (84)	28 (82)	30 (85)
Mean daily minimum °C (°F)	23 (73)	23 (73)	23 (73)	23 (73)	24 (75)	24 (75)	24 (75)	24 (75)	24 (75)	24 (75)	24 (75)	23 (73)	24 (74)
Average precipitation mm (inches)	69 (2.7)	44 (1.7)	37 (1.5)	29 (1.1)	87 (3.4)	137 (5.4)	131 (5.2)	141 (5.6)	143 (5.6)	134 (5.3)	68 (2.7)	53 (2.1)	1,073 (42.3)
Average rainy days	9.9	7.6	7.4	8.1	21.6	26.5	26.4	26.6	25.8	24.3	15.1	10.4	209.7
Source: Meteoblue

== Demographics ==
Population census of Aloran

Year	Pop.	±% p.a.
1918	8,016	—
1939	12,564	+2.16%
1948	13,052	+0.42%
1960	15,601	+1.50%
1970	18,540	+1.74%
1975	20,515	+2.05%
1980	20,822	+0.30%
1990	20,812	−0.00%

Year	Pop.	±% p.a.
1995	22,275	+1.28%
2000	23,127	+0.81%
2007	23,450	+0.19%
2010	26,630	+4.74%
2015	27,625	+0.70%
2020	27,934	+0.23%
2024	28,095	+0.14%

Source: Philippine Statistics Authority

In the 2024 census, the population of Aloran was 28,095 people, with a density of 240 inhabitants per square kilometre or 620 inhabitants per square mile.

== Economy ==
Poverty incidence of Aloran (%)

Source: Philippine Statistics Authority

== Festival ==
"Bunga Dag Tabinal Festival" is held every September 21.

== Gallery ==
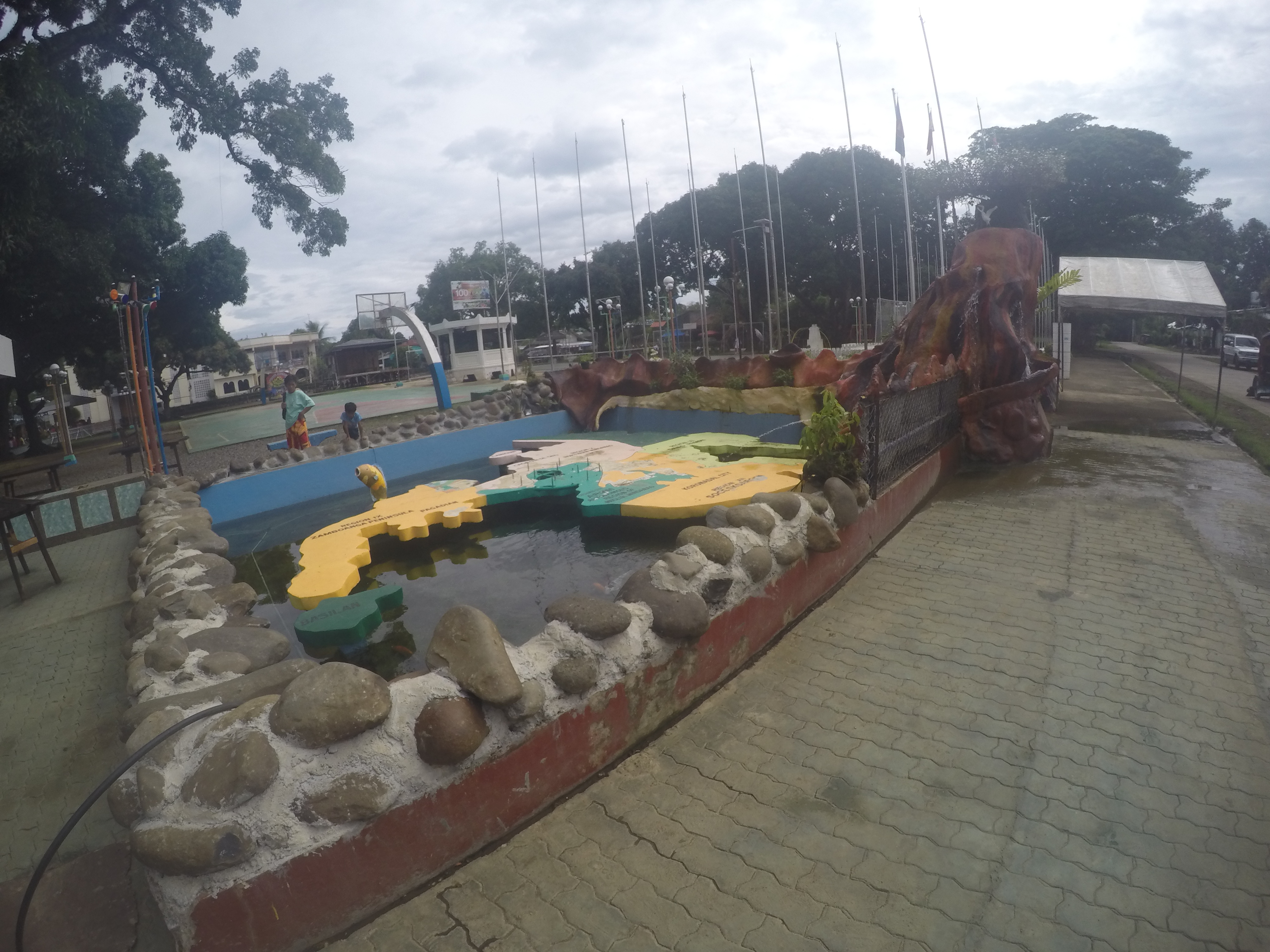
Municipal Plaza and Koi Pond

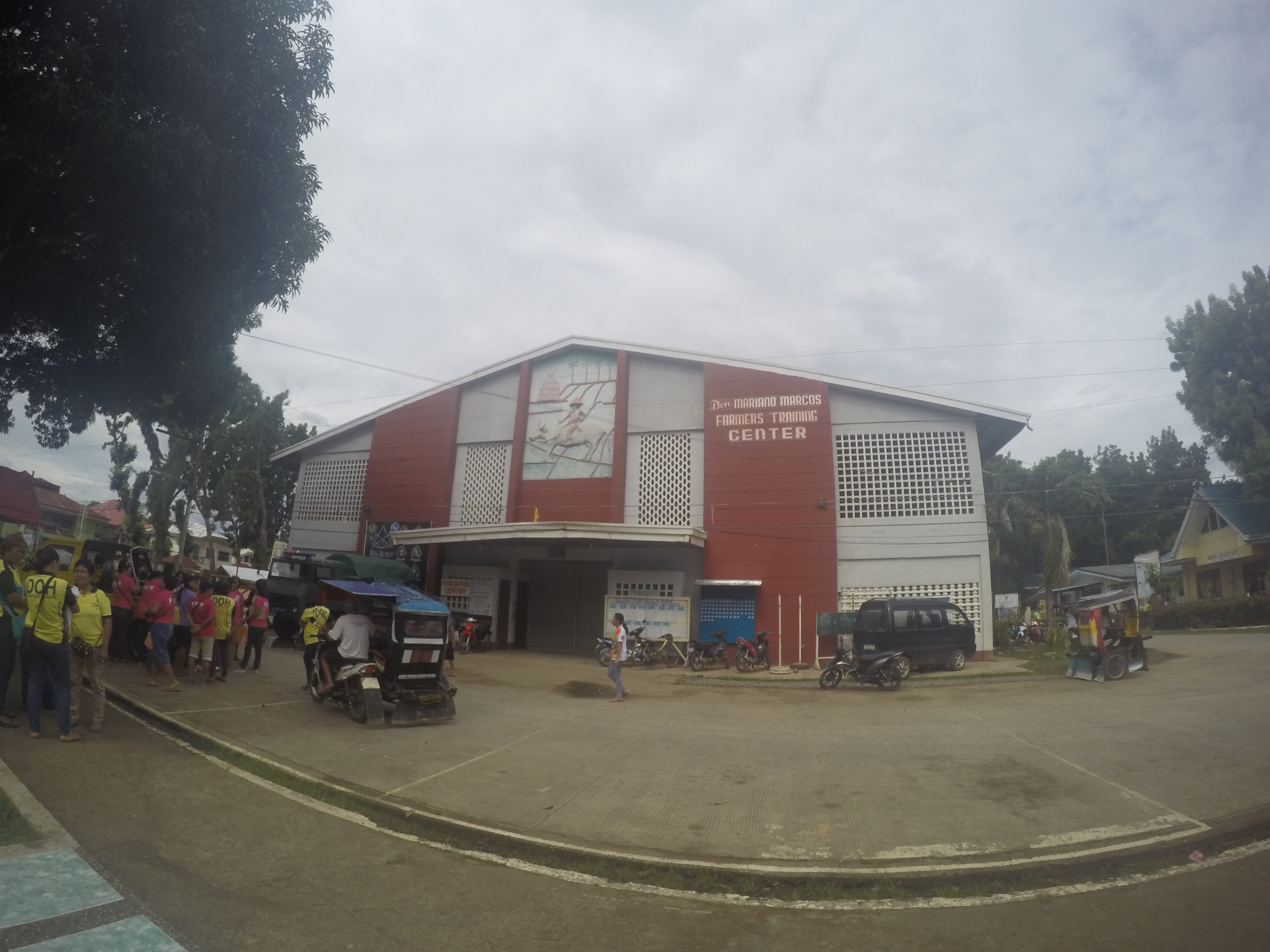
Don Mariano Marcos Farmers' Training Center

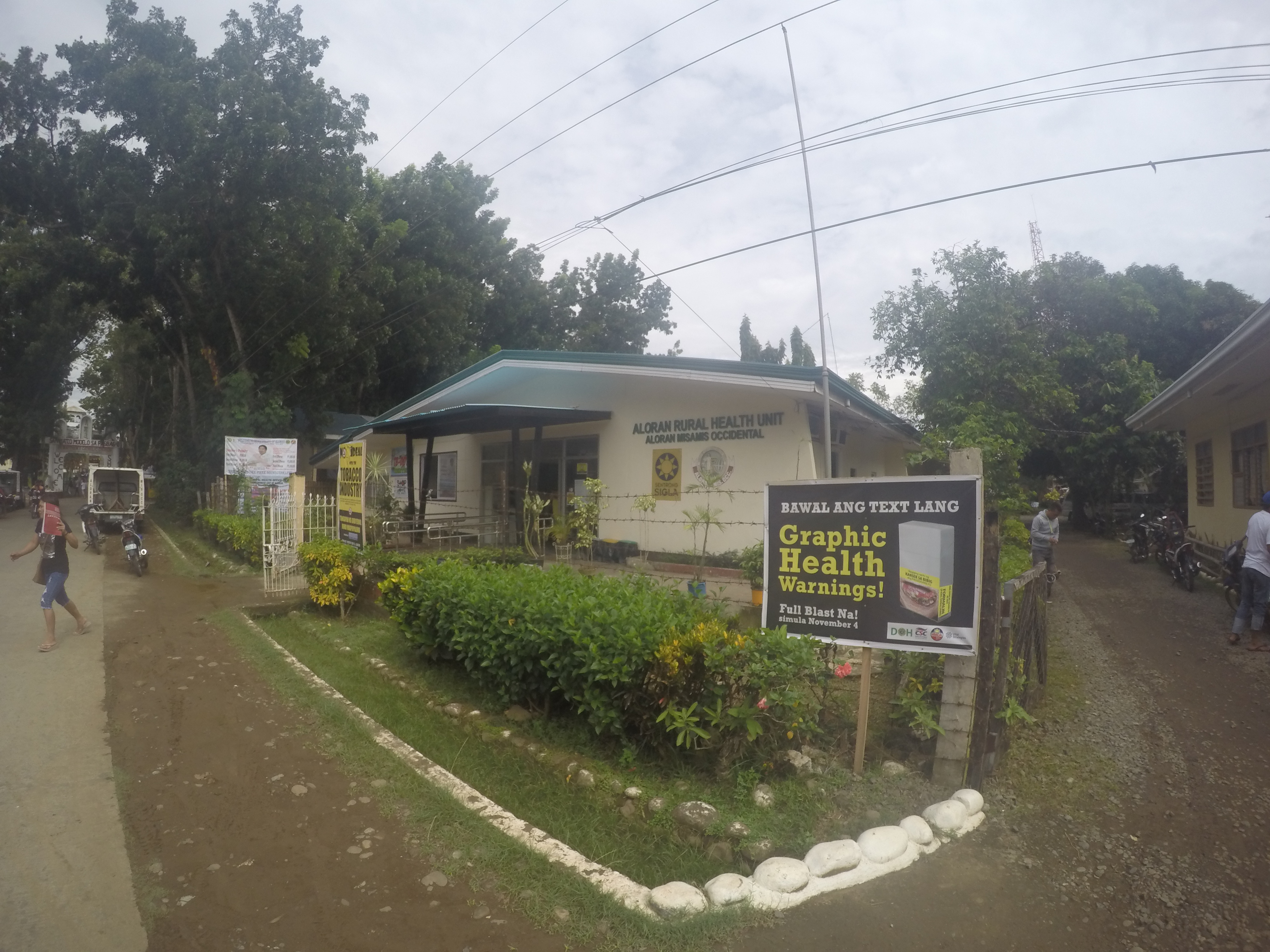
Rural Health Unit

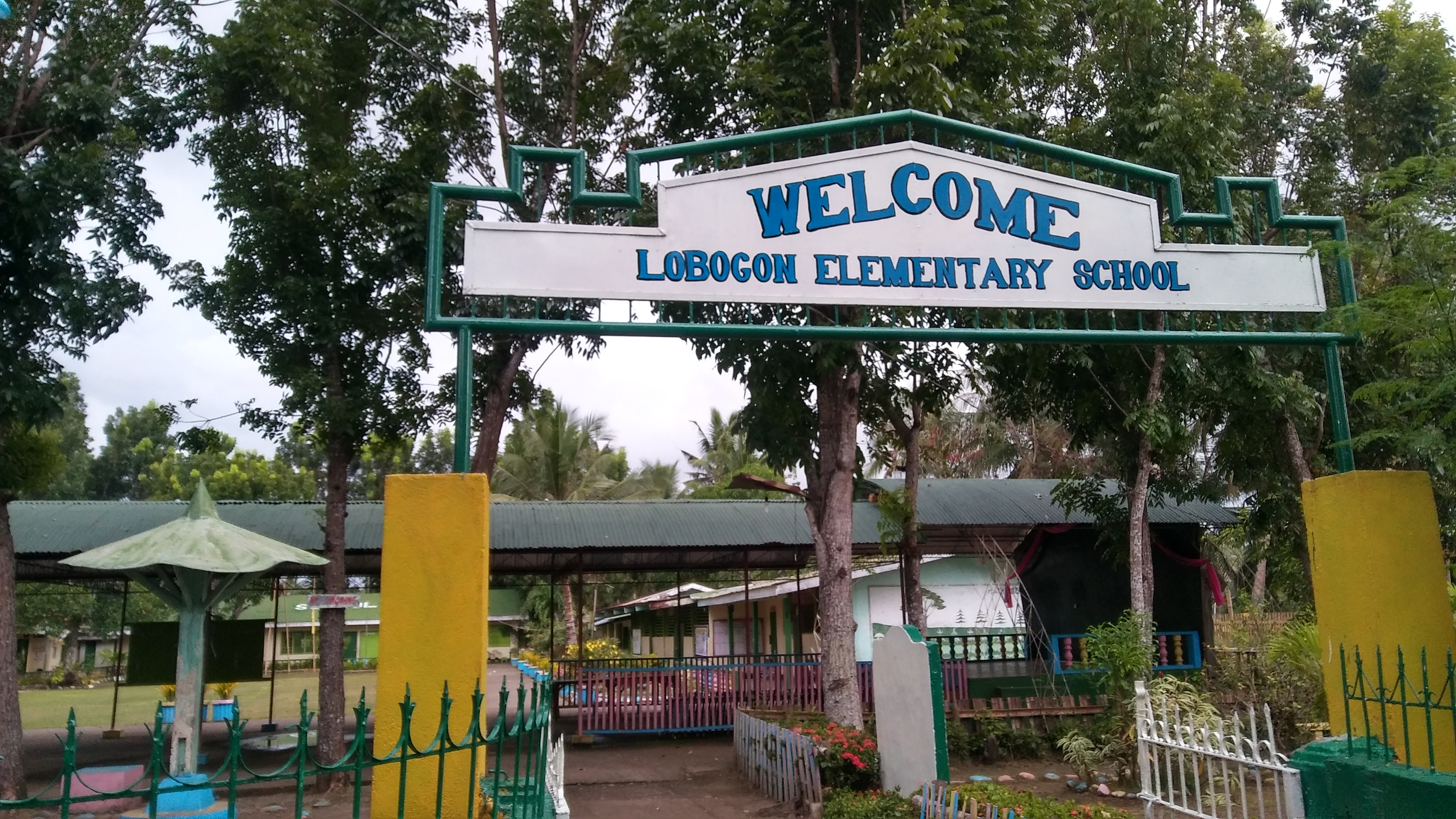
Lobogon Elementary School
