= Misamis Occidental =

- Province
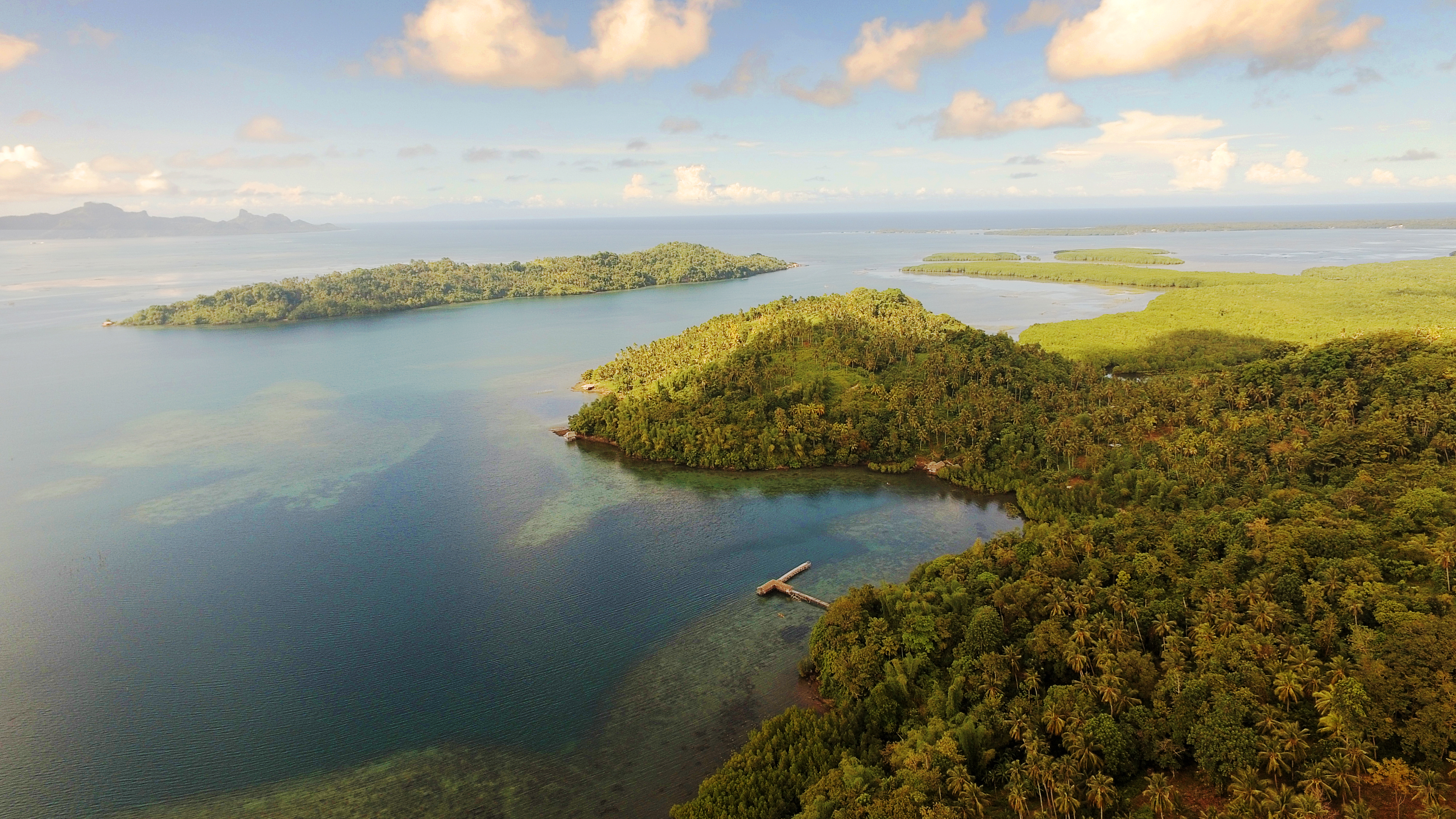
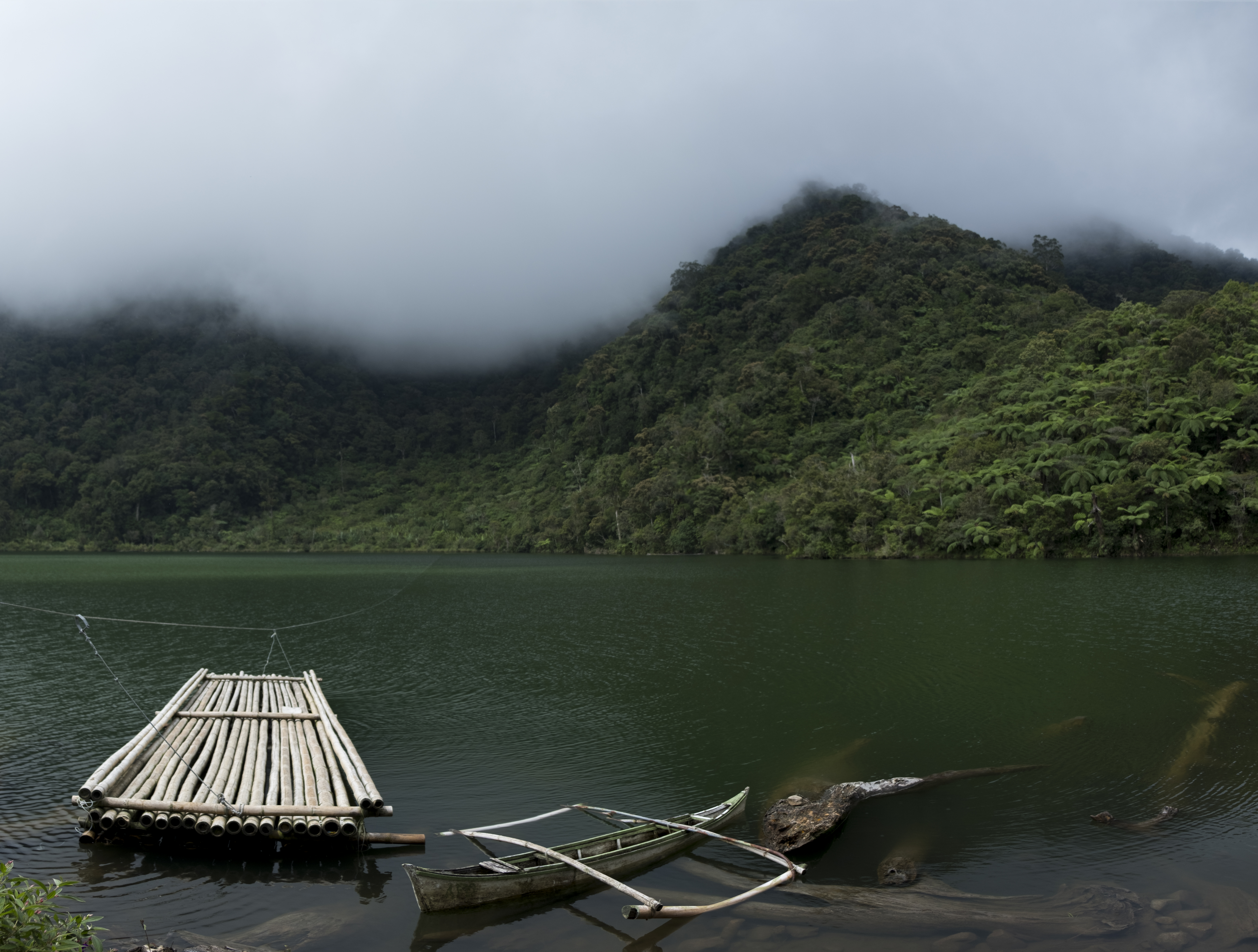
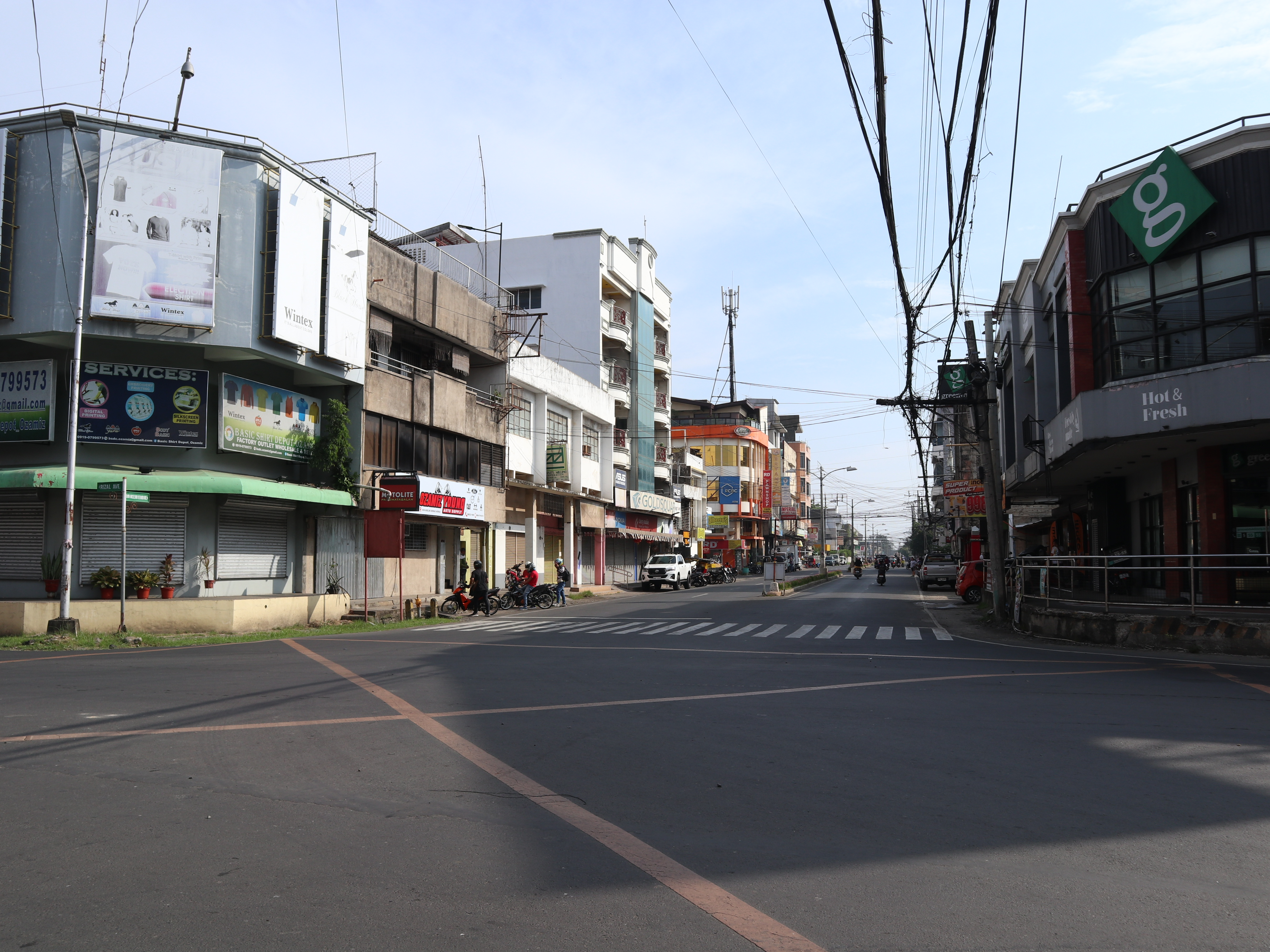
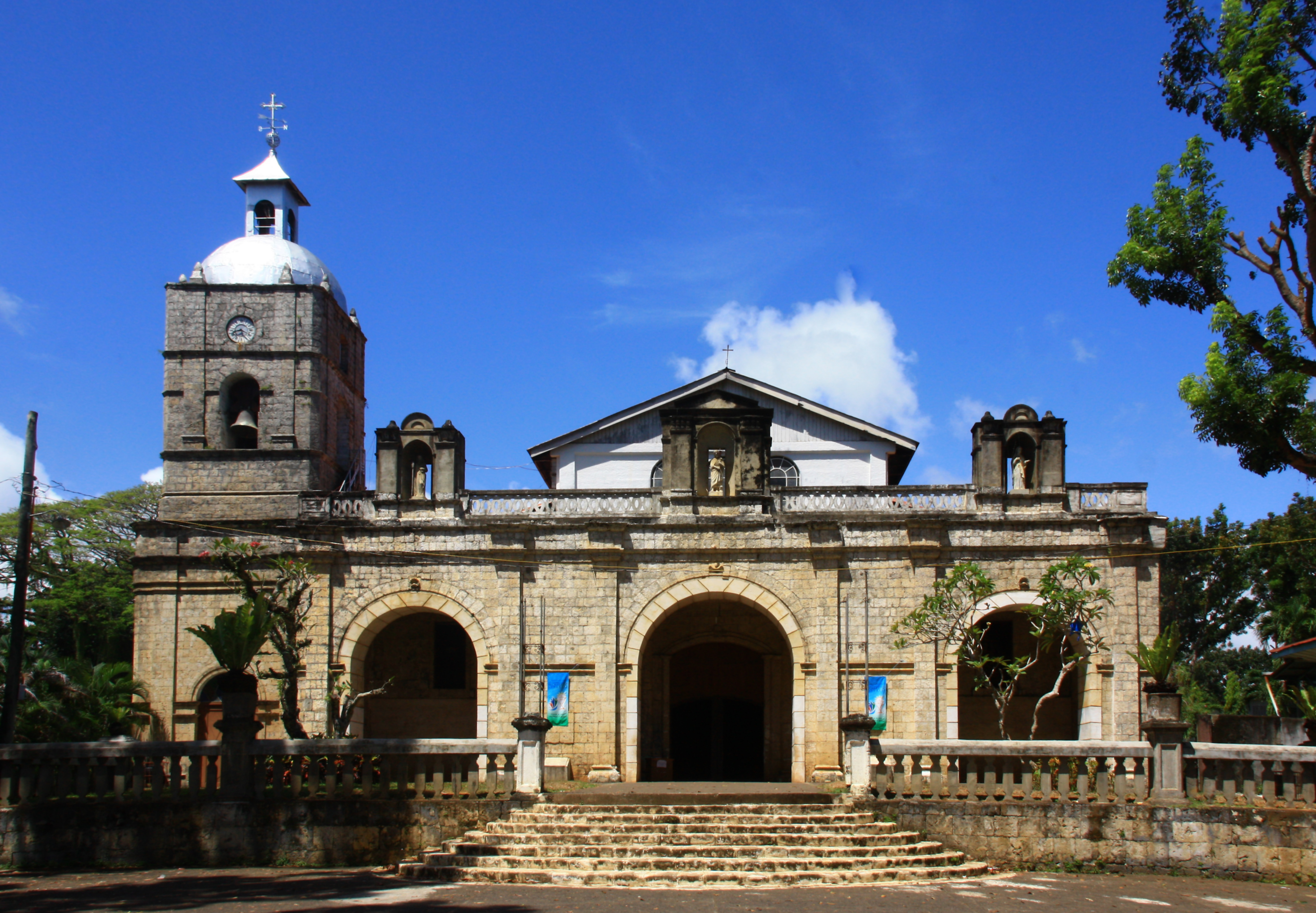
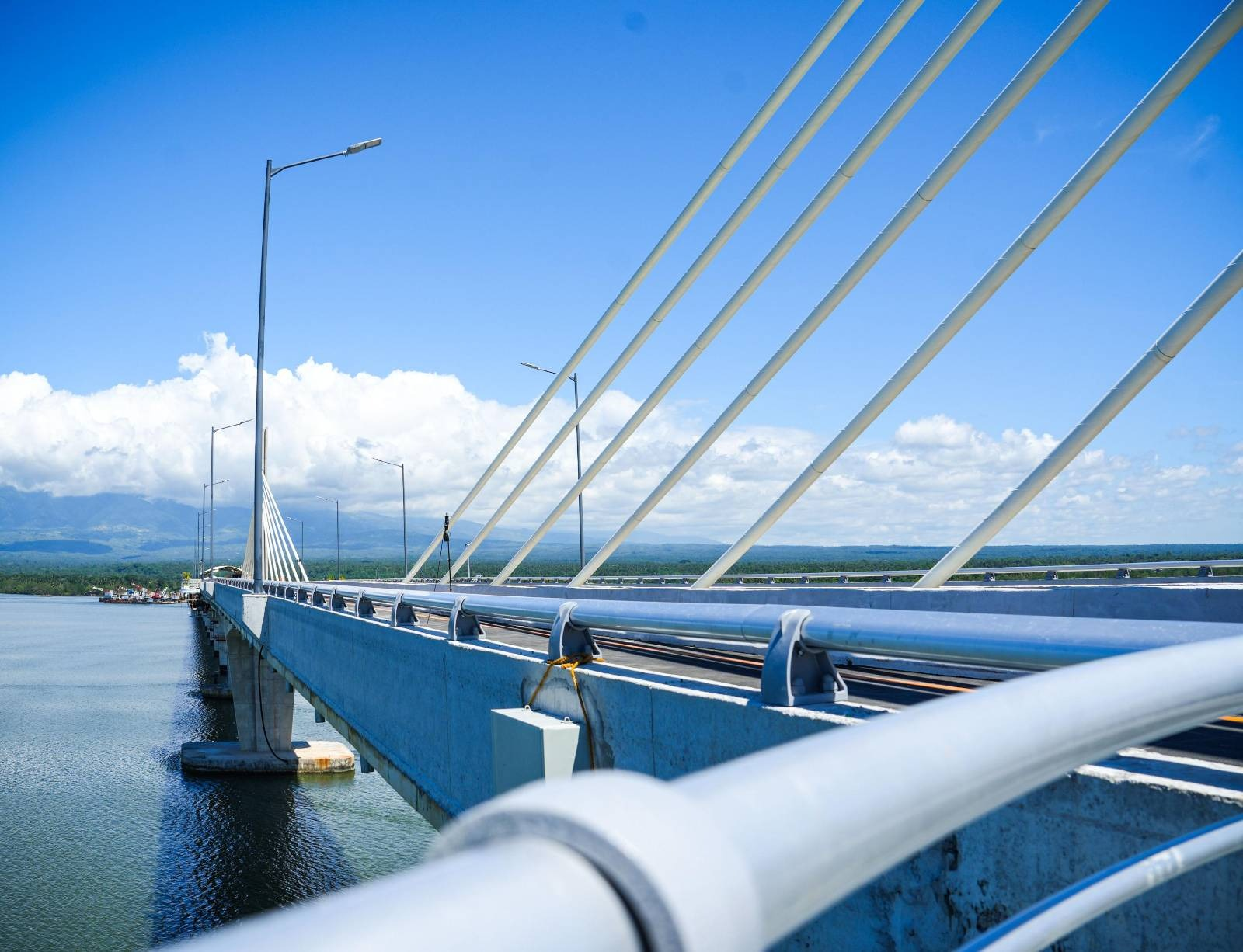
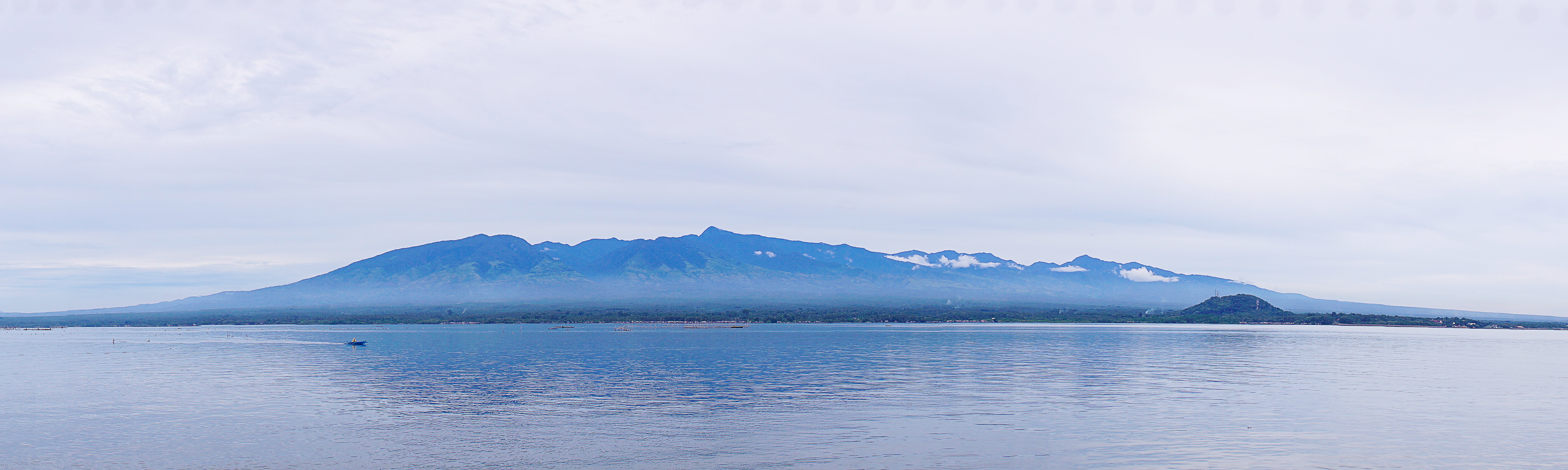
- (from top: left to right) Baliangao seascape, Lake Duminagat, Downtown Ozamiz, Jimenez Church, Panguil Bay Bridge, and Mount Malindang

- Flag Seal
- Nickname: Mis Occ
- Location in the Philippines
- Coordinates: 8°20′N 123°42′E
- Country: Philippines
- Region: Northern Mindanao
- Founded: November 2, 1929
- Capital: Oroquieta
- Largest city: Ozamiz

Government
  - Type: Sangguniang Panlalawigan
  - Governor: Henry S. Oaminal Sr. (NP)
  - Vice Governor: Rowena L. Gutierrez (Asenso Pinoy Party)
  - Legislature: Misamis Occidental Provincial Board
  - Electorate: 437,401 voters (2025)

Area
  - Total: 2,006.63 km^{2} (774.76 sq mi)
  - Rank: 60th out of 82
- Highest elevation (Mount Malindang): 2,404 m (7,887 ft)

Population (2024 census)
  - Total: 621,993
  - Rank: 50th out of 82
  - Density: 309.969/km^{2} (802.816/sq mi)
  - Rank: 26th out of 82
  - Households: 149,188
- Demonym: West Misamisnon

Divisions
  - Independent cities: 0
  - Component cities: 3: Oroquieta; Ozamiz; Tangub
  - Municipalities: 14: Aloran; Baliangao; Bonifacio; Calamba; Clarin; Concepcion; Don Victoriano; Jimenez; Lopez Jaena; Panaon; Plaridel; Sapang Dalaga; Sinacaban; Tudela
  - Barangays: 490
  - Districts: Legislative districts of Misamis Occidental

Economy
  - Income class: 1st provincial income class
  - Poverty incidence: 22.6% (2023)
  - Revenue: ₱ 2,242 million (2024)
  - Assets: ₱ 10,254 million (2024)
  - Expenditure: ₱ 2,019 million (2024)
  - Liabilities: ₱ 1,189 million (2024)
- Time zone: UTC+8 (PST)
- PSGC: 104200000
- IDD : area code: +63 (0)88
- ISO 3166 code: PH-MSC
- Spoken languages: Cebuano; Subanen; Maranao; Tagalog
- Website: misocc.gov.ph

Misamis Occidental (Cebuano: Kasadpang Misamis; Subanen: Sindepan Mis'samis; Maranao: Sedepan Misamis; Filipino: Kanlurang Misamis), officially the Province of Misamis Occidental, is a province located in the region of Northern Mindanao in the Philippines. Its capital is the city of Oroquieta while Ozamiz is the most-populous city. The province borders Zamboanga del Norte and Zamboanga del Sur to the west and is separated from Lanao del Norte by Panguil Bay to the south and Iligan Bay to the east.

== Etymology ==
The province is named after the early settlement of the Spaniards at the entrance to the Panguil Bay. The name Misamis is believed to have been derived from the Subanen word kuyamis which is a variety of the coconut, the staple food of the early settlers. During the years the name persisted as an inference of the geographical location, and upon the advent of the Spanish settlers, the word kuyamis easily gave way to the more convenient pronounceable but corrupted word Misamis.

== History ==
=== Spanish colonial era ===
The area of now Misamis Occidental was first occupied by the Subanen people, who were followed by the Maranao, and later the Visayans, who settled in the coastal areas. During the 1750s, coastal villages in southern Luzon, Visayas, and Mindanao suffered attacks from bands of Muslim pirates, who burned houses and crops, and captured people to be sold as slaves in Maguindanao, Sulu, Borneo, or the islands now known as Indonesia. In response, the colonial government in Manila created a flotilla and appointed a Spanish Jesuit missionary, José Ducos, as its commander.

After several successful battles against the pirates and when some peace had been restored, it was decided to build a stone fort at the mouth of Panguil Bay, at a place called Misamis, and Ducos was put in charge of the construction. The construction began in 1756. It was officially called “Fuerte de la Concepción y del Triunfo”.

Maps of Misamis, before its division

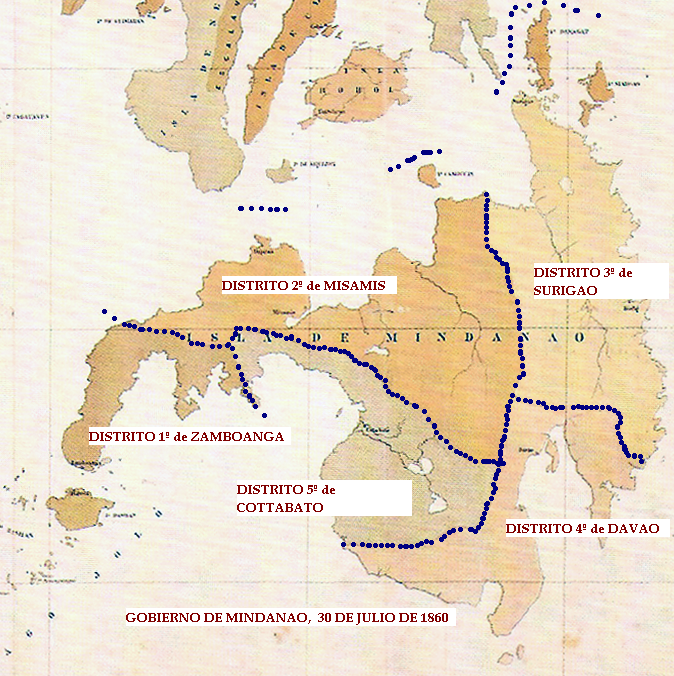
In 1880

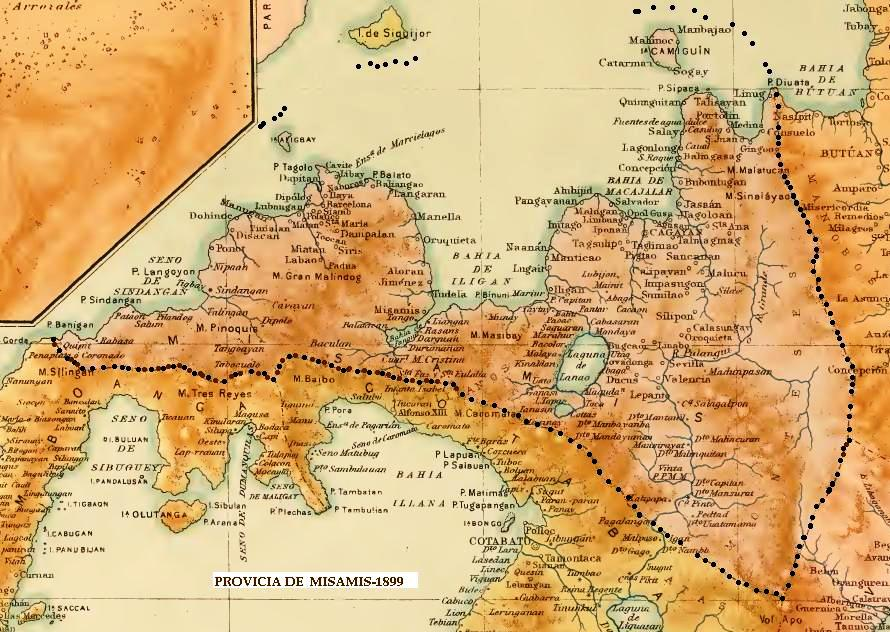
In 1899

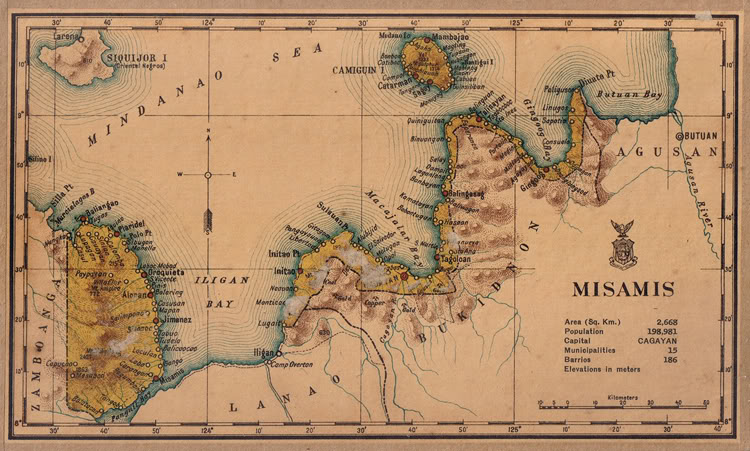
In 1918

In 1818, Mindanao was organized into five politico-military districts, one of which was the Segundo Distrito de Misamis, the largest district in Mindanao. This area was composed of today's Misamis Occidental, Misamis Oriental, Camiguin, Bukidnon, Lanao del Norte, Lanao del Sur, Zamboanga del Norte, and the northern parts of Zamboanga del Sur and Cotabato.

In 1850, the town of Misamis became the capital of the district of Misamis until February 27, 1872, when the Spanish Governor General Carlos María de la Torre y Navacerrada issued a decree declaring Cagayan the permanent capital of Segundo Distrito de Misamis. During this era, the name of the town was Cagayan de Misamis. Undivided Misamis had three pure Spanish-Filipino civilian families and 35 mixed Spanish-Filipino Mestizo civilian families. It was also fortified and colonized by 100 Spanish soldiers.

=== American colonial era ===
On November 2, 1929, Legislative Act No. 3537 passed, dividing the old province of Misamis into Misamis Occidental and Misamis Oriental, which took effect on January 1, 1930. Misamis Occidental comprised the original nine towns of Baliangao, Lopez Jaena, Tudela, Clarin, Plaridel, Oroquieta, Aloran, Jimenez, and Misamis. Don José Ozámiz y Fortich became the first governor.

On January 6, 1930, the provincial council of Misamis Occidental selected Oroquieta to become the capital town (cabecera) of the province.

In 1935, the Provincial Capitol Building, commonly called as the Capitolio, begun construction and became the seat of executive and legislative power of the province in the town of Oroquieta.

=== Japanese occupation ===
On May 6, 1942, the Japanese Imperial forces landed in Misamis Occidental, beginning their brief occupation of the province during World War II. In 1945, combined American and Philippine Commonwealth forces liberated the province, and with the help of the recognized guerilla units, defeated the Japanese forces. During World War II, Oroquieta became the capital of the Free Philippines with the Capitolio serving as the seat of government of the Free Philippines. The United States Forces in the Philippines under Colonel Wendell Fertig. which was based in Misamis Occidental, was the rallying point for the guerrillas in Mindanao. This was historically significant because it is the only time in Philippine history when its capital was in Mindanao, in the region then known as Misamis. The Free Philippine Government was then issuing Misamis Occidental emergency notes. Late President Manuel L. Quezon, upon knowing that Oroquieta was made a capital of the Free Philippines and that the town was issuing emergency notes, authorized the printing of the Mindanao emergency note.

=== Postwar era ===
On July 16, 1948, the town of Misamis became a chartered city by virtue of Republic Act 321, making it the 4th city in Mindanao after Zamboanga, Davao, and Marawi. It was also renamed to Ozamiz after José Ozámiz y Fortich, Misamis Occidental's first governor who later served as the congressional representative of the Lone District of Misamis Occidental, a senator of the Philippines, and a delegate to the 1935 Constitutional Convention that resulted in the creation of the 1935 Constitution for the Philippine Commonwealth Government.

=== Martial law era ===
The late 1960s in Mindanao saw a rise in land dispute conflicts arising from the influx of settlers from Luzon and Visayas, and from the Marcos administration's encouragement of militia groups. News of the 1968 Jabidah massacre ignited a furor in the Moro community, and ethnic tensions encouraged with the formation of secessionist movements, starting from the largely political Muslim Independence Movement and Bangsamoro Liberation Organization, and eventually the Moro National Liberation Front (MNLF), and the Moro Islamic Liberation Front (MILF). Additionally, an economic crisis in late 1969, violent crackdowns on student protests in 1970, and 1971, and eventually the declaration of martial law all led to the radicalization of many students. Many of them left schools in Manila and joined New People's Army units in their home provinces, bringing the New People's Army rebellion to Mindanao for the first time.

The September 1972 declaration of martial law began a 14-year period historically remembered for its human rights abuses, often involving the warrantless detention, murder, and physical, sexual, or mental torture of political opponents, student activists, journalists, religious workers, farmers, and others who fought against the Marcos dictatorship. These were often attributed to military-endorsed Militias - including a number of armed cult groups - which were used to enhance the military's numbers as it fought various resistance movements.

On August 24, 1981 marked a particularly bloody incident in Misamis Occidental history, when members of a fanatical pseudo-religious paramilitary sect called the "Rock Christ" strafed the house of the Gumapons, a Subanon family, in Barrio Lampasan, Tudela, Misamis Occidental. Ten of the twelve persons in the house, including an infant, were killed.

=== Contemporary ===
In May 2010, the people of Misamis Occidental elected their first female governor, Herminia M. Ramiro.

In September 2024, the Panguil Bay Bridge was opened, connecting the province to Lanao del Norte, allowing easier and faster access to the other provinces of Northern Mindanao.

== Geography ==
Misamis Occidental is located near the narrow strip of land linking Northwestern Mindanao, to the North-central part of the island. Covering a total area of 2,055.22 square kilometres (793.52 sq mi), the province is bounded on the northeast by the Bohol Sea, east by Iligan Bay, southeast by the Panguil Bay, and the west by the Zamboanga del Norte and Sur provinces. Except along the coastal area, hilly and rolling land characterized the provincial terrain. Towards the western border, the terrain is particularly rugged.

=== Administrative divisions ===
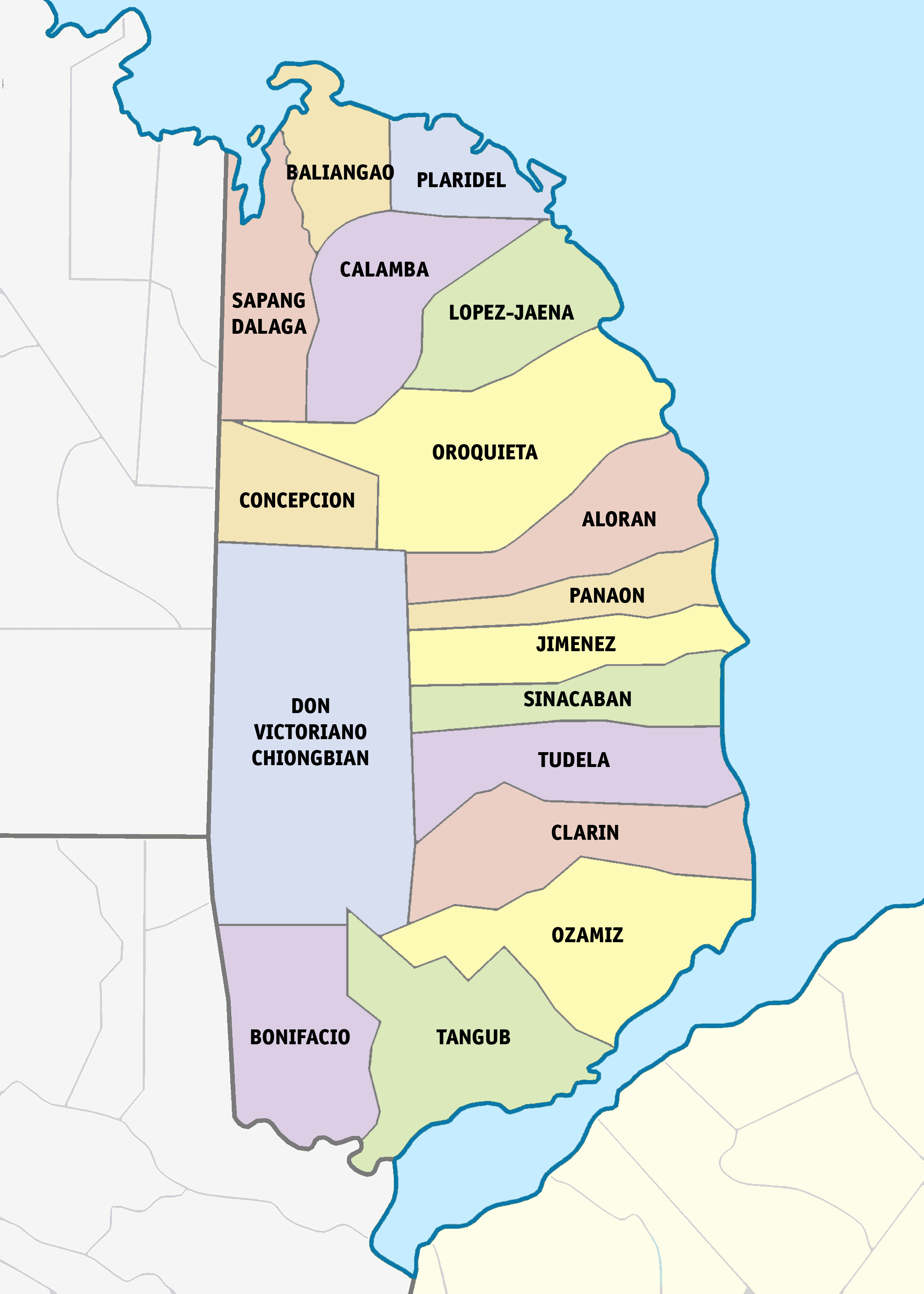
Political map of Misamis Occidental

Misamis Occidental comprises 14 municipalities and three component cities, which are organized into two legislative districts and further subdivided into 490 barangays.

- † Provincial capital and component city
- ∗ Component city
- Municipality

| City or municipality^{[A]} | | District | Population | | | ±% p.a. | Area | | Density | | Barangay | Coordinates^{[B]} |
| | | | (2024) | | (2020) | | km^{2} | sq mi | /km^{2} | /sq mi | | |
|---|---|---|---|---|---|---|---|---|---|---|---|---|
| Aloran | | 1st | 4.5% | 28,095 | 27,934 | +0.14% | 118.06 | 45.58 | 240 | 620 | 38 | 8°25′00″N 123°49′11″E |
| Baliangao | | 1st | 3.0% | 18,500 | 18,433 | +0.09% | 81.72 | 31.55 | 230 | 600 | 15 | 8°39′37″N 123°36′04″E |
| Bonifacio | | 2nd | 5.6% | 34,942 | 34,558 | +0.26% | 155.02 | 59.85 | 220 | 570 | 28 | 8°03′08″N 123°36′49″E |
| Calamba | | 1st | 3.8% | 23,808 | 23,227 | +0.58% | 104.64 | 40.40 | 220 | 570 | 19 | 8°33′29″N 123°38′39″E |
| Clarin | | 2nd | 6.4% | 39,867 | 39,356 | +0.30% | 84.50 | 32.63 | 470 | 1,200 | 29 | 8°11′59″N 123°51′42″E |
| Concepcion | | 1st | 1.1% | 6,608 | 9,324 | −7.78% | 61.60 | 23.78 | 150 | 390 | 18 | 8°25′22″N 123°36′17″E |
| Don Victoriano | | 2nd | 1.6% | 10,214 | 9,664 | +1.21% | 284.60 | 109.88 | 34 | 88 | 11 | 8°15′56″N 123°36′16″E |
| Jimenez | | 1st | 4.7% | 29,265 | 28,909 | +0.29% | 81.43 | 31.44 | 360 | 930 | 24 | 8°20′03″N 123°50′24″E |
| Lopez Jaena | | 1st | 4.1% | 25,806 | 25,507 | +0.27% | 94.70 | 36.56 | 270 | 700 | 28 | 8°33′06″N 123°46′03″E |
| Oroquieta City | † | 1st | 11.5% | 71,373 | 72,301 | −0.30% | 237.88 | 91.85 | 300 | 780 | 47 | 8°29′07″N 123°48′21″E |
| Ozamiz City | ∗ | 2nd | 23.1% | 143,620 | 140,334 | +0.55% | 169.95 | 65.62 | 830 | 2,100 | 51 | 8°08′49″N 123°50′43″E |
| Panaon | | 1st | 1.8% | 10,891 | 10,797 | +0.20% | 46.80 | 18.07 | 230 | 600 | 16 | 8°21′53″N 123°50′24″E |
| Plaridel | | 1st | 6.5% | 40,321 | 39,840 | +0.28% | 80.00 | 30.89 | 500 | 1,300 | 33 | 8°37′15″N 123°42′34″E |
| Sapang Dalaga | | 1st | 3.4% | 21,006 | 20,490 | +0.59% | 93.93 | 36.27 | 220 | 570 | 28 | 8°32′28″N 123°33′59″E |
| Sinacaban | | 2nd | 3.2% | 20,176 | 19,671 | +0.60% | 99.09 | 38.26 | 200 | 520 | 17 | 8°17′07″N 123°50′35″E |
| Tangub City | ∗ | 2nd | 11.0% | 68,419 | 68,389 | +0.01% | 162.78 | 62.85 | 420 | 1,100 | 55 | 8°03′40″N 123°45′03″E |
| Tudela | | 2nd | 4.7% | 29,082 | 28,599 | +0.39% | 98.52 | 38.04 | 290 | 750 | 33 | 8°14′35″N 123°50′43″E |
| Total | | | | 621,993 | 617,333 | +0.18% | 2,006.63 | 774.76 | 310 | 800 | 490 | (see GeoGroup box) |
1. Former names are italicized.; 2. Coordinates are sortable by latitude. (Italicized entries indicate the generic location. Otherwise, they mark the city or town center).

== Demographics ==
Population census of Misamis Occidental

| Year | Pop. | ±% p.a. |
|---|---|---|
| 1903 | 45,370 | — |
| 1918 | 81,015 | +3.94% |
| 1939 | 210,057 | +4.64% |
| 1948 | 207,575 | −0.13% |
| 1960 | 248,371 | +1.51% |
| 1970 | 319,855 | +2.56% |

| Year | Pop. | ±% p.a. |
|---|---|---|
| 1975 | 356,319 | +2.19% |
| 1980 | 386,328 | +1.63% |
| 1990 | 424,365 | +0.94% |
| 1995 | 458,965 | +1.48% |
| 2000 | 486,723 | +1.27% |
| 2007 | 531,680 | +1.23% |

| Year | Pop. | ±% p.a. |
|---|---|---|
| 2010 | 567,642 | +2.41% |
| 2015 | 602,126 | +1.13% |
| 2020 | 617,333 | +0.53% |
| 2024 | 621,993 | +0.18% |

Source: Philippine Statistics Authority

The population of Misamis Occidental in the 2024 census was 621,993 people, with a density of 300 inhabitants per square kilometre or 780 inhabitants per square mile.

The dense population along the coast consists mainly of ethnic Cebuanos. Thus, Cebuano is the lingua franca of the province. Most of the native Subanens live in the interior uplands. Other inhabitants not native to the province include Maranaos, Maguindanaons, Tausugs, Ilocanos, Kapampangans, Bicolanos, Tagalogs, Pangasinans, Hiligaynons, and Warays. They are minority residents of the province who speak their respective native languages to varying degrees in addition to Cebuano.

=== Religion ===
==== Catholicism ====
As of 2013, Roman Catholicism remains the predominant faith of the people of Misamis Occidental having 70 percent affiliation while the second most members are with the Iglesia Filipina Independiente or Aglipayan Church with 20%.

==== Others ====
Protestantism as well as Islam are the minorities present in the province.

== Economy ==
Poverty incidence of Misamis Occidental (%)

Source: Philippine Statistics Authority

The province economy depends firstly on fishing, secondly on coconuts, and thirdly on rice. The province has 169 kilometres (105 mi) of coastline fronting the rich fishing grounds of Panguil and Iligan bays. It also has the biggest area of brackish water fishponds in the region. Tangub City is a fishing port in Panguil Bay famous for seafood. Coconut is the chief crop. This is processed into oil, desiccated coconut, and coir, most of which are shipped to Cebu. Coconut processing is the main industry in Oroquieta City. Other crops grown in the province are rice, corn, abaca, coffee, cacao, and rubber.

=== Resources ===
Wood is the major forest product. Predominant species are the lauan group, apitong, tanguige yakal, and Philippine mahogany. There is also an abundant supply of bamboo, rattan and various vines. Forest land in the province has an area of 66,002.46 hectares; 53,262 hectares of which are considered a national park (which has legal implications).

The province has a considerable deposit of clay especially in the municipalities of Lopez Jaena and Concepcion. Plaridel is the largest in rice production, and the longest coastal town in the province.

There are also abundant sources of sand and gravel.

The province is traditionally a net exporter of various commodities. Historical data from the Ozamiz Port District of the Bureau of Customs show that outgoing commodities, which is mainly of coconut products, far outweigh incoming cargoes.

Being a coco-based province, major manufacturing firms in Misamis Occidental are engaged in the production of crude coconut oil, cooking oil, lard, margarine, laundry soap, and desiccated coconut. Other products are furniture, ceramic gifts toys and housewares, processed food like banana chips, and marine products.

Locally fabricated agri-industrial machines and equipment are also available in the province.

== Tourism and attractions ==
- Langaranan Festival, Plaridel
- Baobaon Islets, Plaridel
- Shang's Resort, Plaridel
- Century-Old Nazareno Dam, Plaridel
- Caluya Shrine, Sapang Dalaga
- Baliangao Protected Landscape and Seascape
- Binalbal Festival, Tudela
- Christmas Festival of Lights, Tangub City
- Dalit Festival, Tangub City
- Dampawan Festival, Concepcion - September
- Fuerte de la Concepcion y del Triunfo, Ozamiz City
- Hoyohoy Highland Stone Chapel & Adventure Park, Tangub City
- Asenso Global Gardens and View Deck, Tangub City
- Immaculate Conception Cathedral Pipe Organ, Ozamiz City
- Inug-og Festival, Oroquieta City
- Misamis Occidental Aquamarine Park
- Mount Malindang Range Natural Park and Lake Duminagat
- Grand Perangat Festival - November
- Baga Falls, Sapang Dalaga
- Suman Festival, Clarin
- Sinakbang Festival, Sinacaban, Misamis Occidental

== Government ==
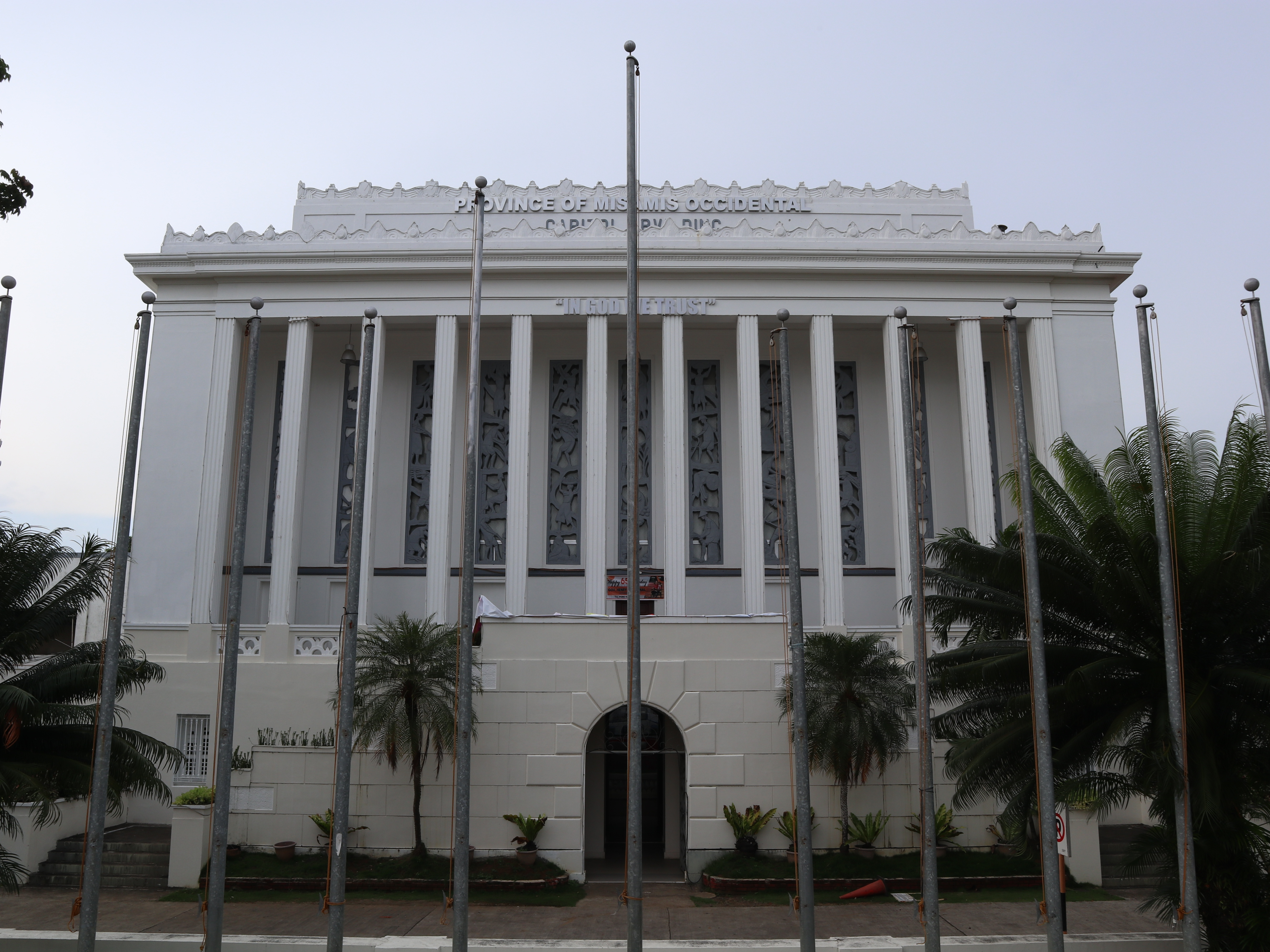
Misamis Occidental Provincial Capitol

1975 seal of the province, registered in NHCP

=== Misamis Occidental ===
- Governor: Atty. Henry S. Oaminal Sr. (NP)
- Vice governor: Rowena "Wheng" L. Gutierrez (Asenso Pinoy Party)
- ABC president: Salvador C. Canlas Jr. - ex-officio board member
- SK Federation chairman: Clara Mie V. Villanueva - ex-officio board member
- IPMR: Juanidy M. Vina - ex-officio board member
- PCL president: Lowida L. Alcalde - ex-officio board member

=== 1st District ===
- Member, House of Representatives: Jason P. Almonte (NP)
- Members, Sangguniang Panlalawigan:
  - Alejandro “Alex” J. Guantero Jr. (Asenso Pinoy)
  - Winston “Dondon” V. Catane (Asenso Pinoy)
  - Rosanne Marie “Tata” L. Paylaga-Lim (Asenso Pinoy)
  - Donna R. Iyog (Asenso Pinoy)
  - Agnes C. Villanueva, CPA (Asenso Pinoy)

=== 2nd District ===
- Member, House of Representatives: Sancho Fernando “Ando” F. Oaminal (Lakas)
- Members, Sangguniang Panlalawigan:
  - Calven Tito C. Decina (Asenso Pinoy)
  - Nemesio D. Lahaylahay Sr. (Asenso Pinoy)
  - Eduardo “Tata” C. Cebedo (Asenso Pinoy)
  - Atty. Heinjie B. Estano (Asenso Pinoy)
  - Jerry R. Cuizon (Asenso Pinoy)

== Notable people ==
- Earl Agustin - singer-songwriter
- Allen Dizon - actor
- Cherry Lou - actress
- Sofronio Vasquez - The Voice Season 26 Winner

== See also ==
- Laguindingan Airport, the first international airport in Northern Mindanao region
