= Panaon, Misamis Occidental =

Municipality in Misamis Occidental, Philippines

Panaon
- Municipality
- Municipality of Panaon
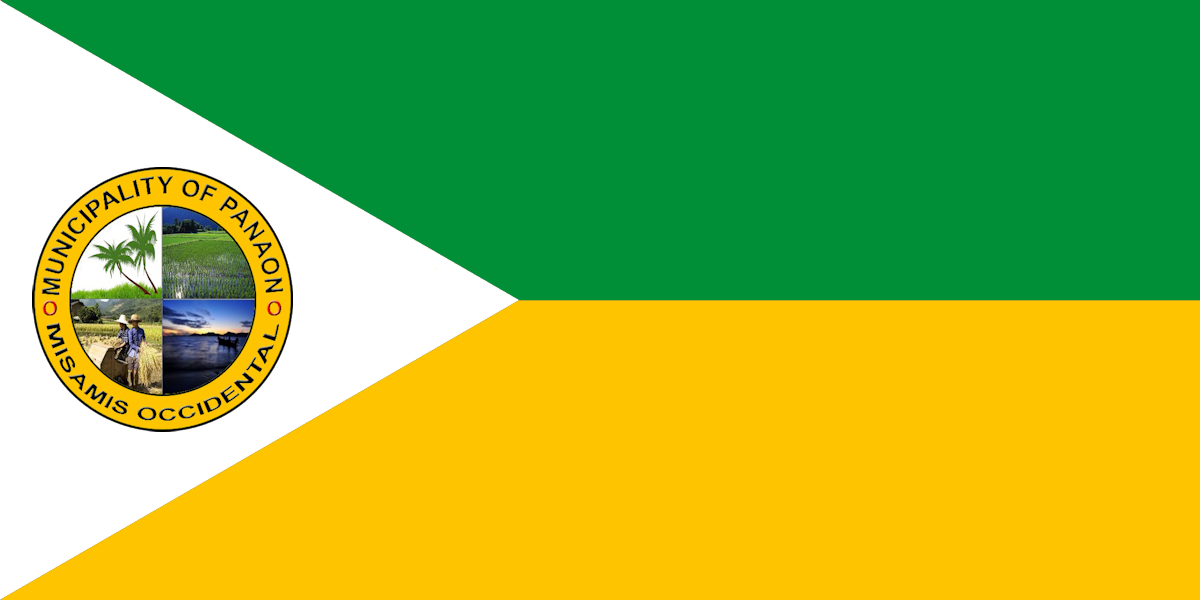
- Flag

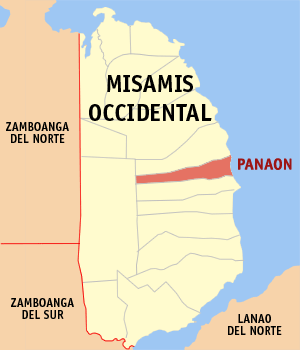
- Map of Misamis Occidental with Panaon highlighted
- Interactive map of Panaon
- Location within the Philippines
- Coordinates: 8°22′00″N 123°50′00″E
- Country: Philippines
- Region: Northern Mindanao
- Province: Misamis Occidental
- District: 1st district
- Founded: June 18, 1966
- Barangays: 16 (see Barangays)

Government
  - Type: Sangguniang Bayan
  - Mayor: Francisco T. Paylaga Jr. (ASPIN)
  - Vice Mayor: Crisanne Ann Marie P. Macias (ASPIN)
  - Representative: Jason P. Almonte (NP)
  - Municipal Council: Members: Patricio M. Jalapit Jr.; Al S. Camunay; Norman T. Tindahan; Paulita R. Galleros; Rosita P. Tac-an; Cecilio P. Pabatang; Hazel P. Balat; Edralyn T. Sombrio
  - Electorate: 7,429 voters (2025)

Area
  - Total: 46.80 km^{2} (18.07 sq mi)
- Elevation: 41 m (135 ft)
- Highest elevation: 212 m (696 ft)
- Lowest elevation: 0 m (0 ft)

Population (2024 census)
  - Total: 10,891
  - Density: 232.7/km^{2} (602.7/sq mi)
  - Households: 2,681

Economy
  - Income class: 4th municipal income class
  - Poverty incidence: 24.74% (2023)
  - Revenue: ₱ 101.5 million (2024)
  - Assets: ₱ 591.1 million (2024)
  - Expenditure: ₱ 103.3 million (2024)
  - Liabilities: ₱ 145.6 million (2024)

Service provider
  - Electricity: Misamis Occidental 2 Electric Cooperative (MOELCI 2)
- Time zone: UTC+8 (PST)
- ZIP code: 7205
- PSGC: 1004211000
- IDD : area code: +63 (0)88
- Native languages: Subanon; Cebuano; Tagalog
- Website: www.panaonmisocc.gov.ph

Panaon, officially the Municipality of Panaon (Cebuano: Lungsod sa Panaon; Tagalog: Bayan ng Panaon), is a municipality in the province of Misamis Occidental, Philippines. According to the 2024 census, it has a population of 10,891 people.

== Geography ==
=== Barangays ===
Panaon is politically subdivided into 16 barangays. Each barangay consists of puroks while some have sitios.

- Baga
- Bangko
- Camanucan
- Dela Paz
- Lutao
- Magsaysay
- Map-an
- Mohon
- Poblacion
- Punta
- Salimpuno
- San Andres
- San Juan
- San Roque
- Sumasap
- Villalin

=== Climate ===
Climate data for Panaon, Misamis Occidental
Month	Jan	Feb	Mar	Apr	May	Jun	Jul	Aug	Sep	Oct	Nov	Dec	Year
Mean daily maximum °C (°F)	27 (81)	28 (82)	29 (84)	30 (86)	30 (86)	30 (86)	30 (86)	30 (86)	30 (86)	29 (84)	29 (84)	28 (82)	29 (84)
Mean daily minimum °C (°F)	23 (73)	22 (72)	22 (72)	23 (73)	23 (73)	24 (75)	23 (73)	23 (73)	24 (75)	24 (75)	23 (73)	23 (73)	23 (73)
Average precipitation mm (inches)	69 (2.7)	44 (1.7)	37 (1.5)	29 (1.1)	87 (3.4)	137 (5.4)	131 (5.2)	141 (5.6)	143 (5.6)	134 (5.3)	68 (2.7)	53 (2.1)	1,073 (42.3)
Average rainy days	9.9	7.6	7.4	8.1	21.6	26.5	26.4	26.6	25.8	24.3	15.1	10.4	209.7
Source: Meteoblue

== Demographics ==
Population census of Panaon
Year	Pop.	±% p.a.
1970	6,570	—
1975	7,049	+1.42%
1980	7,612	+1.55%
1990	8,844	+1.51%
1995	8,655	−0.40%
2000	7,441	−3.19%
2007	9,266	+3.07%
2010	10,176	+3.47%
2015	10,209	+0.06%
2020	10,797	+1.19%
2024	10,891	+0.21%
Source: Philippine Statistics Authority

In the 2024 census, the population of Panaon was 10,891 people, with a density of 230 inhabitants per square kilometre or 600 inhabitants per square mile.

== Economy ==
Poverty incidence of Panaon (%)

Source: Philippine Statistics Authority
