= Concepcion, Misamis Occidental =

Municipality in Misamis Occidental, Philippines

Concepcion
- Municipality
- Municipality of Concepcion
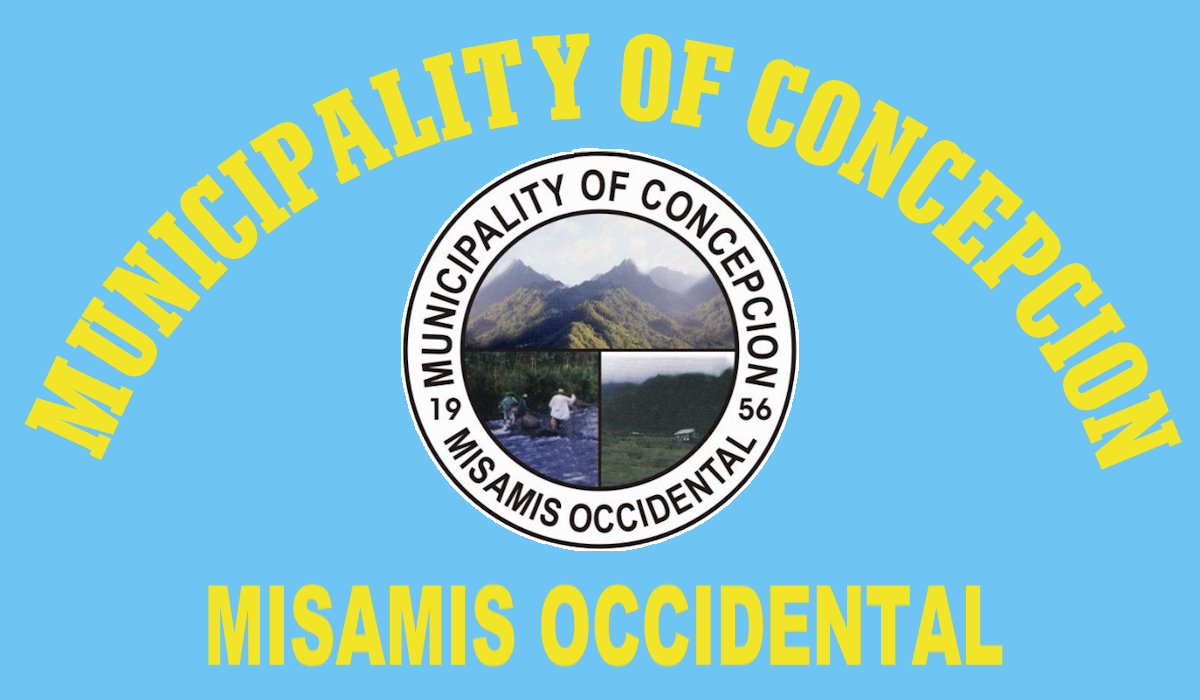
- Flag Seal

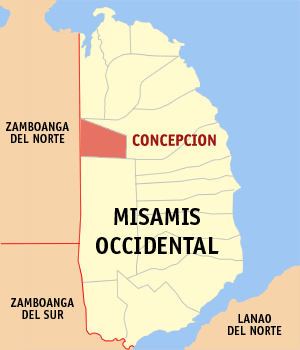
- Map of Misamis Occidental with Concepcion highlighted
- Interactive map of Concepcion
- Location within the Philippines
- Coordinates: 8°25′00″N 123°36′00″E
- Country: Philippines
- Region: Northern Mindanao
- Province: Misamis Occidental
- District: 1st district
- Founded: September 27, 1956
- Barangays: 18 (see Barangays)

Government
  - Type: Sangguniang Bayan
  - Mayor: Jesse S. Viña (ASPIN)
  - Vice Mayor: Ronel J. Montipon (ASPIN)
  - Representative: Jason P. Almonte (NP)
  - Municipal Council: Members: Ismael P. Loquias; Julieto L. Tumagna; Belmor S. Juancho; Rey D. Ponce; Erlinda P. Cabasag; Jeman B. Lumbay; Alcher C. Lamoste; Sherlu M. Rudas
  - Electorate: 3,511 voters (2025)

Area
  - Total: 61.60 km^{2} (23.78 sq mi)
- Elevation: 595 m (1,952 ft)
- Highest elevation: 1,503 m (4,931 ft)
- Lowest elevation: 236 m (774 ft)

Population (2024 census)
  - Total: 6,608
  - Density: 107.3/km^{2} (277.8/sq mi)
  - Households: 2,271

Economy
  - Income class: 5th municipal income class
  - Poverty incidence: 45.43% (2023)
  - Revenue: ₱ 87.33 million (2024)
  - Assets: ₱ 315.1 million (2024)
  - Expenditure: ₱ 76.13 million (2024)
  - Liabilities: ₱ 74.09 million (2024)

Service provider
  - Electricity: Misamis Occidental 1 Electric Cooperative (MOELCI 1)
- Time zone: UTC+8 (PST)
- ZIP code: 7213
- PSGC: 1004206000
- IDD : area code: +63 (0)88
- Native languages: Subanon; Cebuano; Tagalog
- Website: www.concepcionmisocc.gov.ph

Concepcion, officially the Municipality of Concepcion (Cebuano: Lungsod sa Concepcion; Tagalog: Bayan ng Concepcion), is a municipality in the province of Misamis Occidental, Philippines. According to the 2024 census, it has a population of 6,608 people, making it the least populated municipality in the province.

It is considered as a suburb to the provincial capital, Oroquieta.

== Geography ==
=== Barangays ===
Concepcion is politically subdivided into 18 barangays. Each barangay consists of puroks while some have sitios.

- Bagong Nayon
- Capule
- New Casul
- Guiban
- Laya-an
- Lingatongan
- Maligubaan
- Mantukoy
- Marugang
- Poblacion
- Pogan
- Small Potongan
- Soso-on
- Upper Dapitan
- Upper Dioyo
- Upper Potongan
- Upper Salimpono
- Virayan

=== Climate ===
Climate data for Concepcion, Misamis Occidental
Month	Jan	Feb	Mar	Apr	May	Jun	Jul	Aug	Sep	Oct	Nov	Dec	Year
Mean daily maximum °C (°F)	23 (73)	24 (75)	25 (77)	27 (81)	26 (79)	26 (79)	26 (79)	26 (79)	26 (79)	26 (79)	25 (77)	24 (75)	25 (78)
Mean daily minimum °C (°F)	19 (66)	19 (66)	19 (66)	19 (66)	20 (68)	20 (68)	19 (66)	19 (66)	20 (68)	20 (68)	19 (66)	19 (66)	19 (67)
Average precipitation mm (inches)	69 (2.7)	44 (1.7)	37 (1.5)	29 (1.1)	87 (3.4)	137 (5.4)	131 (5.2)	141 (5.6)	143 (5.6)	134 (5.3)	68 (2.7)	53 (2.1)	1,073 (42.3)
Average rainy days	9.9	7.6	7.4	8.1	21.6	26.5	26.4	26.6	25.8	24.3	15.1	10.4	209.7
Source: Meteoblue (modeled/calculated data, not measured locally)

== Demographics ==
Population census of Concepcion

Year	Pop.	±% p.a.
1960	3,989	—
1970	3,046	−2.66%
1975	1,698	−11.06%
1980	2,332	+6.55%
1990	3,877	+5.22%
1995	5,017	+4.95%

Year	Pop.	±% p.a.
2000	6,900	+7.07%
2007	8,355	+2.67%
2010	7,410	−4.27%
2015	10,937	+7.70%
2020	9,324	−3.30%
2024	6,608	−7.93%

Source: Philippine Statistics Authority

In the 2024 census, the population of Concepcion was 6,608 people, with a density of 110 inhabitants per square kilometre or 280 inhabitants per square mile.

== Economy ==
Poverty incidence of Concepcion (%)

Source: Philippine Statistics Authority
