= Sapang Dalaga =

Municipality in Misamis Occidental, Philippines

- Municipality
- Municipality of Sapang Dalaga
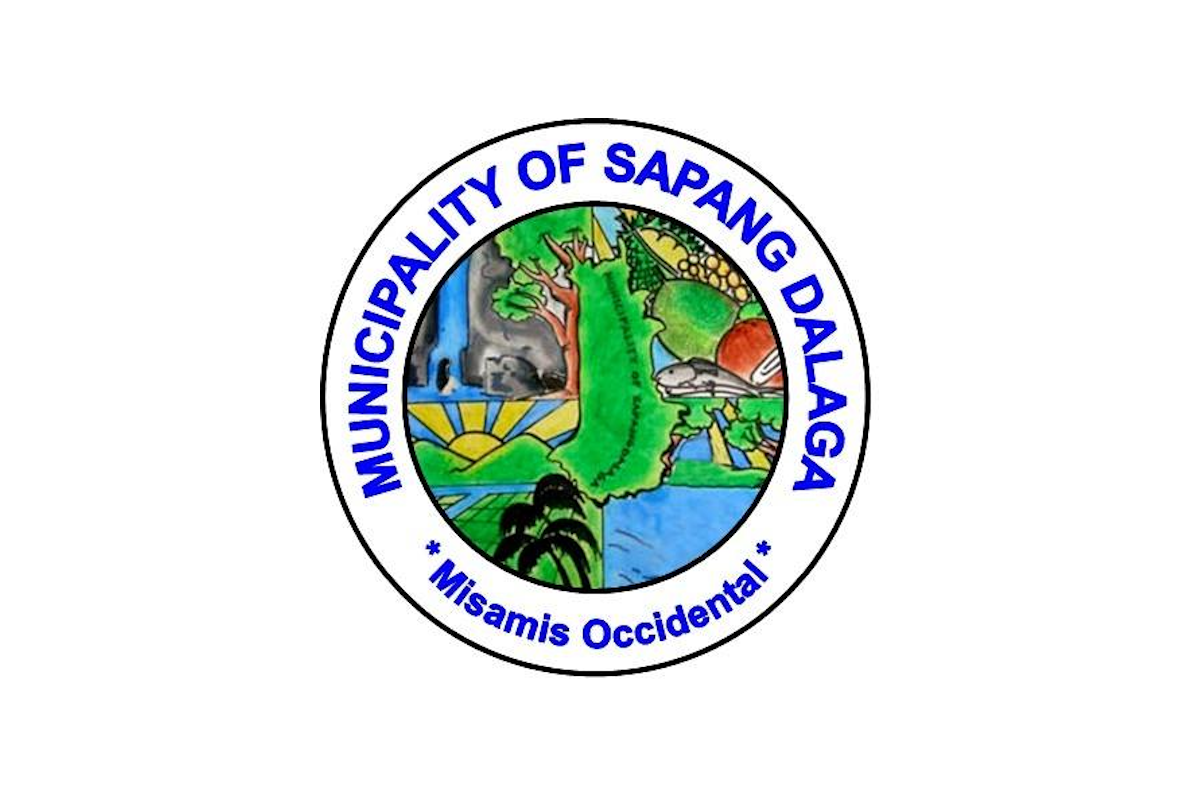
- Flag
- Etymology: Maiden in a creek
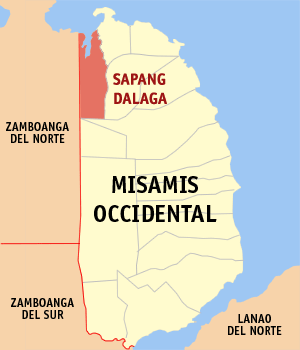
- Map of Misamis Occidental with Sapang Dalaga highlighted
- Interactive map of Sapang Dalaga
- Location within the Philippines
- Coordinates: 8°33′N 123°34′E
- Country: Philippines
- Region: Northern Mindanao
- Province: Misamis Occidental
- District: 1st district
- Founded: August 12, 1957
- Barangays: 28 (see Barangays)

Government
  - Type: Sangguniang Bayan
  - Mayor: Dawn M. Animas (ASPIN)
  - Vice Mayor: Donjie D. Animas (ASPIN)
  - Representative: Jason P. Almonte (NP)
  - Municipal Council: Members: Demmie M. Animas; Charlito D. Tillo; Melvin M. Capundag; Roel Ryan P. Maniwan; Eufemia A. Suminguit; Gerryl O. Demoser; Francisco P. Laranjo Jr.; Cynthia B. Lopina
  - Electorate: 14,982 voters (2025)

Area
  - Total: 93.93 km^{2} (36.27 sq mi)
- Elevation: 109 m (358 ft)
- Highest elevation: 448 m (1,470 ft)
- Lowest elevation: 0 m (0 ft)

Population (2024 census)
  - Total: 21,006
  - Density: 223.6/km^{2} (579.2/sq mi)
  - Households: 5,156

Economy
  - Income class: 4th municipal income class
  - Poverty incidence: 37.96% (2023)
  - Revenue: ₱ 130 million (2024)
  - Assets: ₱ 524.9 million (2024)
  - Expenditure: ₱ 37.79 million (2024)
  - Liabilities: ₱ 152.1 million (2024)

Service provider
  - Electricity: Misamis Occidental 1 Electric Cooperative (MOELCI 1)
- Time zone: UTC+8 (PST)
- ZIP code: 7212
- PSGC: 1004213000
- IDD : area code: +63 (0)88
- Native languages: Subanon; Cebuano; Tagalog
- Website: www.sapangdalagamisocc.gov.ph

Sapang Dalaga, officially the Municipality of Sapang Dalaga (Cebuano: Lungsod sa Sapang Dalaga; Northern Subanen: Benwa Sapang Dalaga; Tagalog: Bayan ng Sapang Dalaga), is a municipality in the province of Misamis Occidental, Philippines. According to the 2024 census, it has a population of 21,006 people.

It is located 96 kilometres (60 mi) from Ozamiz City and 50 kilometres (31 mi) from Dipolog Airport in Dipolog, Zamboanga del Norte.

It is rich in mineral resources such as gold, copper and manganese, and has mountains, rivers, waterfalls and beaches. Baga (meaning "waterfalls" in the native language) is one kilometer from the town center and can be reached by foot or motor vehicles. Mountains, such as Mount Dasa and Mount Pedoluan, are also nearby. Casul Bay, which connects to Murcielagos Bay, can be navigated.

== Etymology ==
Its name is derived from the phrase sapa ng dalaga (ancient Visayan language dating back to the 14th century before Spanish colonization), meaning "maiden in a creek".

The names of some barangays were derived from rivers and trees, for example, Guinabot came from a river, Locus was derived from the native locus tree.

== Geography ==
=== Barangays ===
Sapang Dalaga is politically subdivided into 28 barangays. Each barangay consists of puroks while some have sitios.

- Bautista
- Bitibut
- Boundary
- Caluya
- Capundag
- Casul
- Dalumpinas
- Dasa
- Dioyo
- Disoy
- El Paraiso
- Guinabot
- Libertad
- Locus
- Macabibo
- Manla
- Masubong
- Medallo
- Agapito Yap Sr. (Napilan)
- Poblacion
- Salimpuno
- San Agustin
- Sapang Ama
- Sinaad
- Sipac
- Sixto Velez Sr.
- Upper Bautista
- Ventura

=== Climate ===
Climate data for Sapang Dalaga, Misamis Occidental
Month	Jan	Feb	Mar	Apr	May	Jun	Jul	Aug	Sep	Oct	Nov	Dec	Year
Mean daily maximum °C (°F)	27 (81)	27 (81)	29 (84)	30 (86)	30 (86)	29 (84)	29 (84)	29 (84)	30 (86)	29 (84)	29 (84)	28 (82)	29 (84)
Mean daily minimum °C (°F)	22 (72)	22 (72)	22 (72)	23 (73)	24 (75)	24 (75)	23 (73)	23 (73)	23 (73)	23 (73)	23 (73)	22 (72)	23 (73)
Average precipitation mm (inches)	69 (2.7)	44 (1.7)	37 (1.5)	29 (1.1)	87 (3.4)	137 (5.4)	131 (5.2)	141 (5.6)	143 (5.6)	134 (5.3)	68 (2.7)	53 (2.1)	1,073 (42.3)
Average rainy days	9.9	7.6	7.4	8.1	21.6	26.5	26.4	26.6	25.8	24.3	15.1	10.4	209.7
Source: Meteoblue

== Demographics ==
Population census of Sapang Dalaga

Year	Pop.	±% p.a.
1960	10,538	—
1970	13,704	+2.66%
1975	16,078	+3.26%
1980	17,515	+1.73%
1990	17,945	+0.24%
1995	21,084	+3.07%

Year	Pop.	±% p.a.
2000	17,794	−3.57%
2007	16,567	−0.98%
2010	19,431	+5.97%
2015	19,983	+0.53%
2020	20,490	+0.53%
2024	21,006	+0.60%

Source: Philippine Statistics Authority

In the 2024 census, the population of Sapang Dalaga was 21,006 people, with a density of 220 inhabitants per square kilometre or 570 inhabitants per square mile.

== Economy ==
Poverty incidence of Sapang Dalaga (%)

Source: Philippine Statistics Authority

Its economy is based on agriculture, with root crops such as gabi, palaw, sweet potato, ube and apale. It has plantation of coconuts, lanzones, mangosteen, rambotan, marang, hibi (June plume), guyabano, santol, durian and native bananas. Herbal plants such as Salingkapao (tawa-tawa), buyo, dalapot (sambong) grows in each household plot. Vegetables such as string beans, squash, malunggay, likway, bago and sikwa can be found. Sea foods such as bongcawel, saang, bacase, king crabs, nukos (squid), lato (seaweeds), kitong, dangget, lapu-lapu, pasayan (prawn) can be bought every Friday (market day).
