= Iligan Bay Alliance of Misamis Occidental =

- Abbreviation: IBAMO

Agency overview
- Formed: February 2012
- Legal personality: Alliance of local government units

Jurisdictional structure
- Operations jurisdiction: Tudela, Sinacaban, Jimenez, Panaon, Aloran, Oroquieta City, Lopez Jaena, Plaridel, Misamis Occidental, Philippines

Operational structure
- Agency executive: Hon. Francisco Paylaga, Jr., chairman

Iligan Bay Alliance of Misamis Occidental (IBAMO) is an organization in Misamis Occidental tasked with protecting Iligan Bay, Philippines, from pollution, overfishing and overharvesting of marine resources. IBAMO covers the 60-kilometre (37 mi) coasts of the municipalities of Tudela, Sinacaban, Jimenez, Panaon, Aloran, Lopez Jaena and Plaridel and the city of Oroquieta. IBAMO was originally the Iligan Bay Coastal Resource Management and Development Program (IBRCMDP) in 2005. In 2010, it became an alliance known as the Iligan Bay Alliance of Misamis Occidental. From 2011 to 2013, the WorldFish project “From Ridge to Reef (R2R): An Ecosystem Approach to Biodiversity Conservation and Development in the Philippines” continued the support with funding from USAID to strengthen and expand the membership of IBAMO.

== Misamis Occidental Provincial Ordinance No. 99-16 ==
“AN ORDINANCE ADOPTING THE HARMONIZED ILIGAN BAY ALLIANCE IN MISAMIS OCCIDENTAL FISHERIES CODE” provides the framework of the organization and operation of IBAMO, including its powers, duties and functions.

== Members ==
=== Local government units ===
- Provincial Government of Misamis Occidental
- Municipal Government of Tudela
- Municipal Government of Sinacaban
- Municipal Government of Jimenez
- Municipal Government of Panaon
- Municipal Government of Aloran
- City Government of Oroquieta
- Municipal Government of Lopez Jaena
- Municipal Government of Plaridel

=== Partner institutions ===
- Bureau of Fisheries and Aquatic Resources (BFAR-X)
- Department of Agriculture (DA-X)
- Department of Environment and Natural Resources (DENR-X)
- Department of Tourism (DOT-X)
- Department of Interior and Local Government (DILG-X)
- Department of Science and Technology (DOST-X)
- Department of Labor and Employment (DOLE-X)
- Department of Trade and Industry (DTI-X)
- Misamis University
- University of Science and Technology of Southern Philippines
