= Iligan Bay =

Bay in Philippines

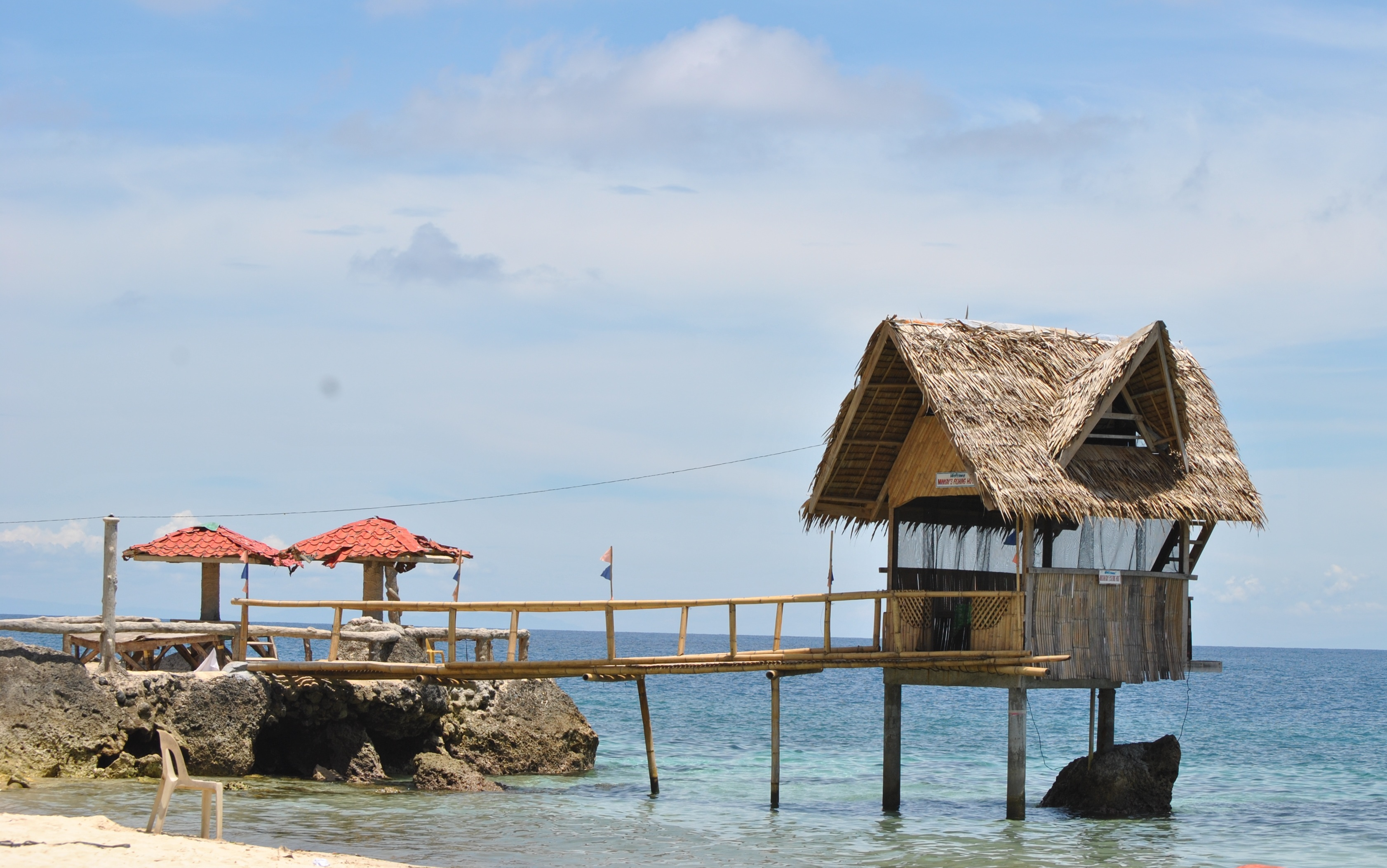
- Beach of Iligan Bay (Initao, Misamis Oriental)

- Location within the Philippines Iligan Bay (Philippines)
- Location: Mindanao, Philippines
- Coordinates: 8°25′N 124°05′E
- Type: bay
- Part of: Bohol Sea
- Surface area: 2,390 km^{2} (920 sq mi)
- Shore length^{1}: 170 km (110 mi)
- Settlements: Aloran; Bacolod; Clarin; Gitagum; Iligan; Initao; Jimenez; Kauswagan; Kolambugan; Laguindingan; Libertad; Linamon; Lopez Jaena; Lugait; Maigo; Manticao; Naawan; Oroquieta; Panaon; Plaridel; Sinacaban; Tudela
- ^{1} Shore length is not a well-defined measure.

Iligan Bay is a bay in Mindanao Island in the Philippines. The bay is part of the Bohol Sea, and curves into the northern coast of Mindanao Island.

A branch of the bay, Panguil Bay, forms a natural isthmus with Illana Bay and geographic boundary between the Zamboanga Peninsula and the rest of Mindanao island.

The provinces covered along its coast are Misamis Occidental, Misamis Oriental, and Lanao del Norte.

Iligan City is the most important port on Iligan Bay. Other important ports are in Oroquieta City, Plaridel, Misamis Occidental and Lugait, Misamis Oriental. To protect Iligan Bay from destruction and biodiversity degradation, eight local government units and the provincial government of Misamis Occidental organized the Iligan Bay Alliance of Misamis Occidental.
