= Ricardo Enriquez Rotoras =

Filipino university president (1967– 2017)

Dr. Ricardo E. Rotoras Doctor of Engineering
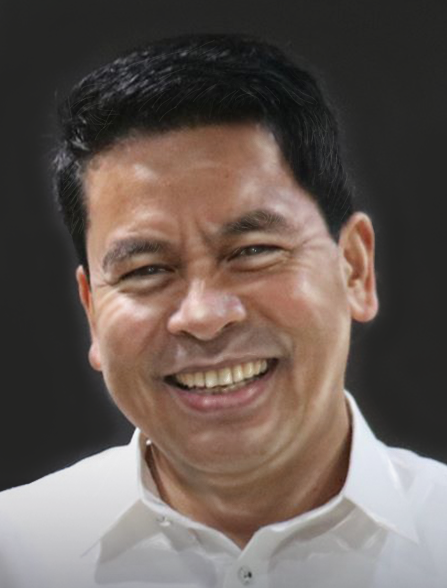

President, University of Science and Technology of Southern Philippines, Cagayan de Oro
- In office 2002–2017
- Preceded by: Montano Salvador as President of Mindanao Polytechnic State College
- Succeeded by: Rosalito Quirino as Temporary Designated President

Personal details
- Born: 18 September 1967 Cagayan de Oro
- Died: 2 December 2017 (aged 50) Golden Glow North Subdivision, Carmen, Cagayan de Oro, Philippines
- Cause of death: Murder
- Resting place: Greenhills Memorial Park, Bulua; Cagayan de Oro, Philippines
- Spouse: Engr. Zarah Lynn A. Rotoras
- Children: 3
- Education: Don Mariano Marcos Polytechnic State College
- Occupation: Professor; Engineer
- Website: www.ustp.edu.ph
- Nickname: Ric

Ricardo Enriquez Rotoras (September 18, 1967 – December 2, 2017) was a Filipino educator who served as president of the University of Science and Technology of Southern Philippines (USTP) in Cagayan de Oro, Philippines, since 2006. Rotoras also served 4 terms as president of the Philippine Association of State Universities and Colleges. In December 2017 he was murdered.

== Education ==
- Doctor of Engineering, Specialization: Energy Economics and Planning

Graduated in 2002 from the Asian Institute of Technology (AIT) Klong Luang, Pathumthani, Thailand.

- Post-doctoral studies, Research Fellow at North Carolina State University under the Fulbright-Hays grant.

== Career/Accomplishment record after graduation from AIT ==
- Dean, College of Engineering and Architecture, Mindanao Polytechnic State College (2002–2006)
- Director, Center for Research in Engineering, Mindanao Polytechnic State College (2002–2006)
- President, Mindanao Polytechnic State College (February 2006 – March 2010)
- President, University of Science and Technology of Southern Philippines Formerly Mindanao University of Science and Technology (March 2010 – 2017)
- OIC President (concurrent capacity), Northwestern Mindanao State College of Science and Technology (March 2010 – September 2012)
- President, Mindanao Association of State Colleges and Universities (June 2010 – June 2011)
- National President, Philippine Association of State Universities and Colleges (PASUC), July 2011 – 2017
- Vice Chair, National Academe-Industry Council, 2013–2017
- Gamma Kappa Phi Fraternity and Sorority member
- Past-President of Rotary Club of Cagayan de Oro Centerpoint (Rotary International District 3870)
- Worshipful Master 2015 of Macajalar Masonic Lodge No. 184 under the jurisdiction of the Most Worshipful Grand Lodge of the Philippines
