= University of Science and Technology of Southern Philippines Claveria =

Public university in Misamis Oriental, Philippines

University of Science and Technology of Southern Philippines - Claveria
- Pamantasan ng Agham at Teknolohiya ng Dakong Timog ng Pilipinas - Claveria (Filipino)
- Former names: Claveria Municipal High School (1963–1967); Claveria National Rural High School (1967–1983); Misamis Oriental State College of Agriculture and Technology (1983-2016)
- Motto: Harmony; Excellence; Integrity; Responsibility and Service to God, Country and Mankind
- Type: Semi-Public State College
- Active: 1963–2016 (amalgamated with Mindanao University of Science and Technology to establish the University of Science and Technology of Southern Philippines)
- Affiliations: Philippine Association of State Universities and Colleges (PASUC), Mindanao Association of State Colleges and Universities Foundation, Inc. (MASCUF)
- Chancellor: Renato O. Arazo Ph.D
- Faculty: ca.
- Administrative staff: ca.
- Students: ca.
- Undergraduates: ca.
- Postgraduates: ca.
- Location: Claveria, Misamis Oriental, Philippines; 8°36′35″N 124°53′06″E
- Campus: Main Campus (65 hectares) Field laboratories and Production enterprises (32 hectares)
- Nickname: USTP - Claveria
- Website: www.ustp.edu.ph/claveria/
- Location in Mindanao Location in the Philippines

The University of Science and Technology of Southern Philippines – Claveria Campus (USTP Claveria), formerly Misamis Oriental State College of Agriculture and Technology (MOSCAT), is a public institution of tertiary education.

In 2016, MOSCAT was amalgamated with the Mindanao University of Science and Technology to establish the University of Science and Technology of Southern Philippines.

== Profile ==
=== History ===
MOSCAT started as Claveria Municipal High School in 1963 with 165 students and five teachers under the leadership of its first administrator, the late Romeo Abilo. In 1967, it was converted to Claveria National Rural High School (CNRHS) by virtue of RA 3781 under the staunch leadership of the late Marcos Edrolin. On June 10, 1983, Batas Pambansa 402 was approved and converted the CNRHS to Misamis Oriental State College of Agriculture and Technology or MOSCAT with Arsenio B. Gonzales as its first president. Gonzales’ term was highlighted by the Republic of The Philippines-European Union Agricultural Education Grant providing more facilities and machinery, vehicles, buildings and faculty training locally and abroad. During his period, the notable Model Farm was established showcasing sustainable upland farming technologies.

In 1996, Dr. Teresita T. Tumapon was appointed as officer-in-charge. She strengthened local and international linkages such as Barangay Integrated Approached for Nutrition Improvement (BIDANI), the Agroforestry Support Program for Empowering Communities Towards Self-reliance in Sustainable Development of the Uplands and the International Center for Research in Agroforestry.

Dr. Juan A. Nagtalon became its second president from 1998 until 2006.

On July 21, 2016, Republic Act No. 10919 established the University of Science and Technology of Southern Philippines (USTSP), which amalgamated the Mindanao University of Science and Technology (MUST) and Misamis Oriental State College of Agriculture and Technology (MOSCAT) transferring its main campus to the 292 hectares in Alubijid, Misamis Oriental.

==== School administrators ====
| Name of OIC / president | Under institution name: | Years served |
|---|---|---|
| Romeo Abilo | Claveria Municipal High School - CMHS | 1963 |
| Marcos Edrolin | Claveria National Rural High School - CNRHS | 1967 |
| Arsenio B. Gonzales | Misamis Oriental State College of Agriculture and Technology - MOSCAT | 1983–1996 |
| Teresita T. Tumapon, PhD | Misamis Oriental State College of Agriculture and Technology - MOSCAT | 1996–1998 |
| Juan A. Nagtalon, PhD | Misamis Oriental State College of Agriculture and Technology - MOSCAT | 1998–2006 |
| Elpidio R. Bautista, EdD | Misamis Oriental State College of Agriculture and Technology - MOSCAT | 2006–2011 |
| Rosalito A. Quirino, PhD | Misamis Oriental State College of Agriculture and Technology - MOSCAT | 2011–2016 |

==== USTP - Claveria Chancellor ====
| Name of Chancellor | Under institution name: | Years served |
|---|---|---|
| Rosalito A. Quirino, Ph.D | University of Science and Technology of Southern Philippines - Claveria - USTP Claveria | 2016 - 2022 |
| Renato O. Arazo, Ph.D | University of Science and Technology of Southern Philippines - Claveria - USTP Claveria | 2022 - present |

=== Campus ===
USTP Claveria is located in the upland farming community of Poblacion, Claveria, one of the 24 towns comprising the province of Misamis Oriental. It is 600m above sea level and overlooks Macajalar and Gingoog bays. The college has 65 hectares for its main campus and 32 hectares for its field laboratories and production enterprises.

== See also ==
- MASCUF
