= Guintomoyan =

Philippines district

Coordinates: 8°20′47.4252″N 123°47′10.8276″E

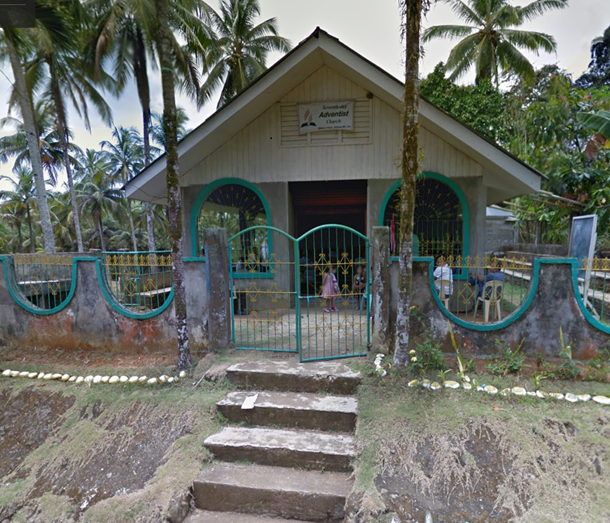
Seventh day Adventist church, Guintomoyan

Guintomoyan is a district (Barangay) of the municipality of Jimenez, Misamis Occidental, Northern Mindanao, Philippines. It is located approximately 7 km west of the core location Jimenez in mountainous terrain and 761 km (air line) southeast of the state capital Manila.

The village consists of a row of farm houses on slopes and ridges on a partial unpaved road and is located 243 m above sea level. In the village live 625 inhabitants (2015). [1]

The inhabitants are mostly farmers who grow corn and coconuts, but also operate livestock (cattle, goats, chickens, pigs, etc.).

In addition to Catholics, there is a large group of the Protestant, the Seventh-Day Adventists, which have a focus in the area around Jimenez; Both groups each have their own church in Guintomoyan.
