= Jimenez Church =

Roman Catholic church in Misamis Occidental, Philippines

- Saint John the Baptist Parish Church
- San Juan Bautista Parish Church
- Iglesia Parroquial de San Juan Bautista (Spanish)
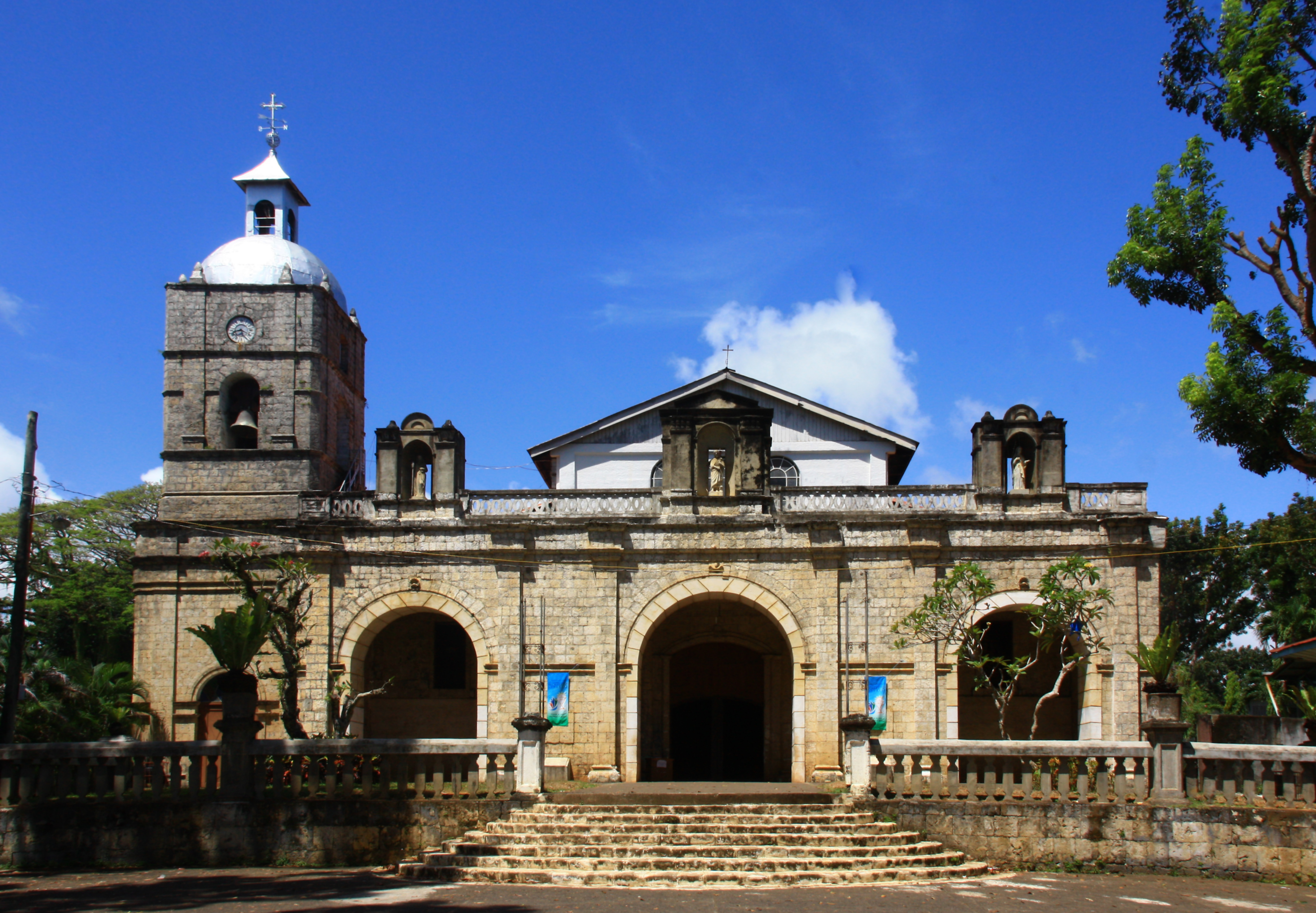
- Church facade in 2015

- Location in Mindanao Location in the Philippines
- 8°20′04″N 123°50′22″E
- Location: Nacional, Jimenez, Misamis Occidental
- Country: Philippines
- Denomination: Roman Catholic

History
- Status: Parish church
- Founded: 1829

Architecture
- Functional status: Active
- Heritage designation: National Cultural treasure
- Designated: 2001
- Architect: Father Roque Azcona
- Architectural type: Church building
- Style: Baroque and Renaissance
- Groundbreaking: 1862
- Completed: Late 1880s

Specifications
- Materials: Coral stone, sand, gravel, cement, steel

Administration
- Archdiocese: Ozamis
- Deanery: St. Luke

Clergy
- Priest: Rev. Fr. Victor Serino

Saint John the Baptist Parish Church, commonly known as Jimenez Church, is a late-19th century, Baroque Roman Catholic church located at Barangay Nacional, Jimenez, Misamis Occidental, Philippines. The parish church, under the patronage of Saint John the Baptist, is under the jurisdiction of the Archdiocese of Ozamis. The church was declared a National Cultural Treasure of the Philippines in 2001.

== History ==
The town of Jimenez was originally established by the Augustinian Recollects in 1829 and with Our Lady of the Most Holy Rosary as its patron saint. The present church, built mostly from hewn coral stone, was erected in the 19th century on a site previously settled by the Subanon people, a local tribe. The erection of the church structure is attributed to Father Roque Azcona between the years 1862 to 1863. The church was believed to have been completed in the late 1880s.

In August 2025, a local content creator and online entrepreneur Christine Medalla allegedly spat on a church's stoup while being filmed, which she denied. The incident sparked outrage among residents and Roman Catholic worshippers, leading to the church's temporary closure ordered by Ozamis Archbishop Martin Jumoad due to the church's desecration.

== Architecture ==
The church is predominantly Baroque in architecture with features reminiscent of the Renaissance style. The church façade, contrary to other Roman Catholic churches of the same era, is devoid of a pediment. It features a portico with three semicircular arched entrances lined on top with a parapet. The rectangular mass of the portico is crowned by three pedimented saints' niches. Behind the façade is the nave wall with its simple, gabled roof and windows. To the left of the church stands the rectangular, three-tiered bell tower topped with finials, a domed roof and a lantern. The clock mechanism are still intact.

== Interior ==
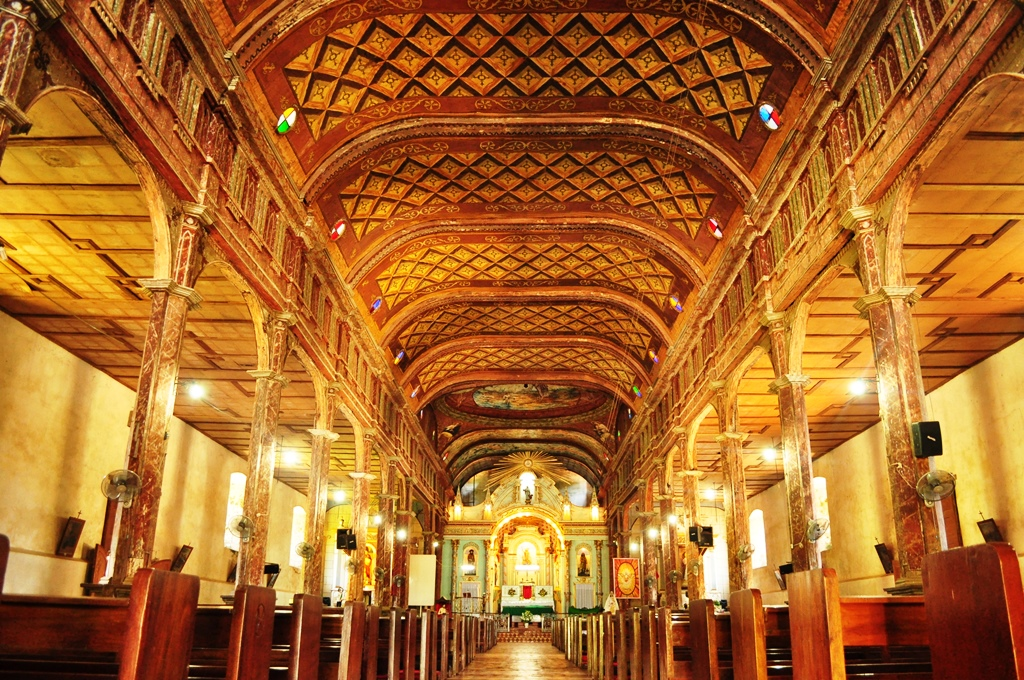
Church interior in 2013

The interiors of the church is reportedly one of the best preserved interior of a Roman Catholic church in Mindanao. It features a painting done in 1898 and portions made of tabique pampango, a local version of a dry wall using panels of interwoven slats or branches and covered with lime.

== Gallery ==
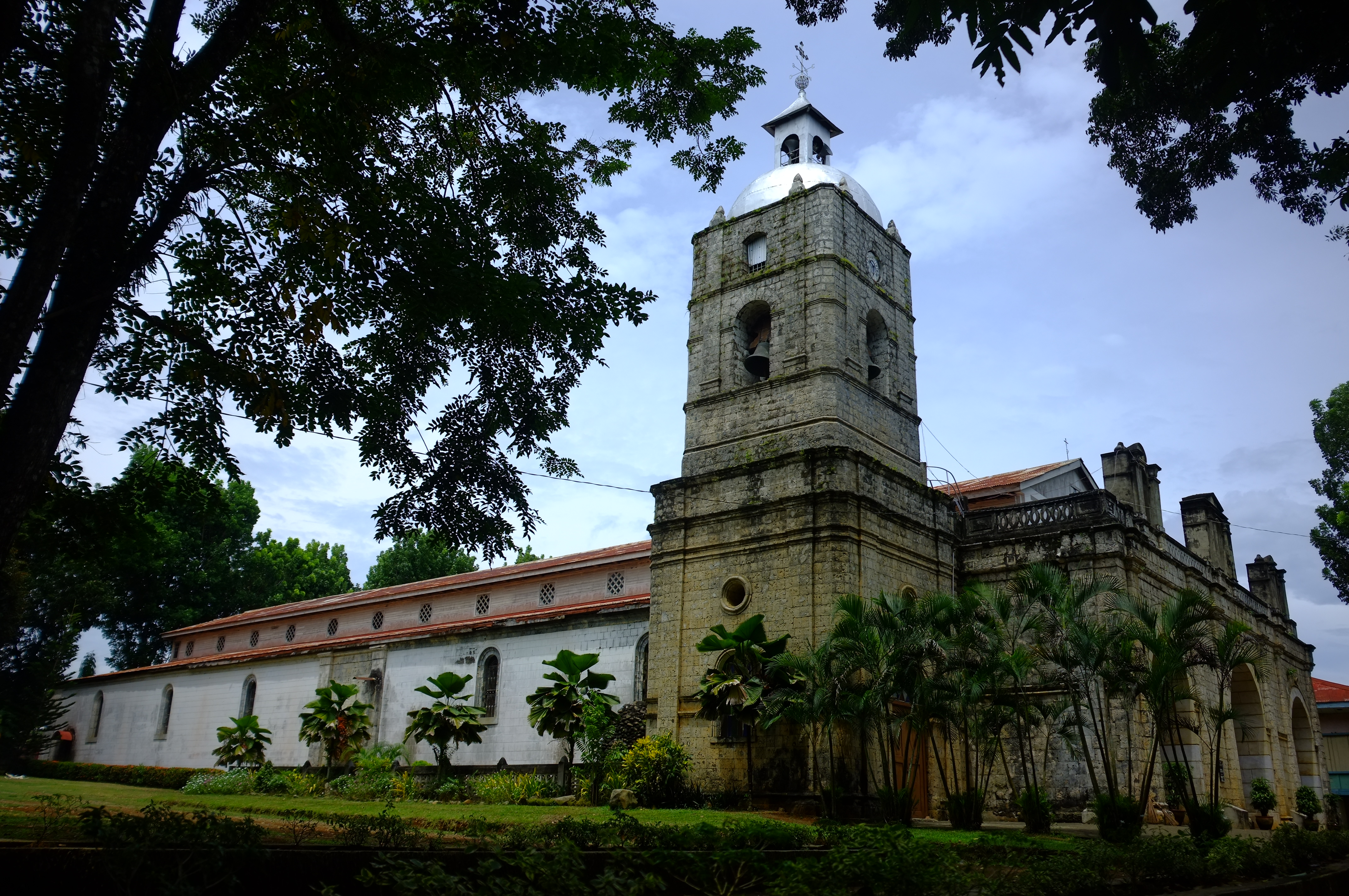
Side view of the church

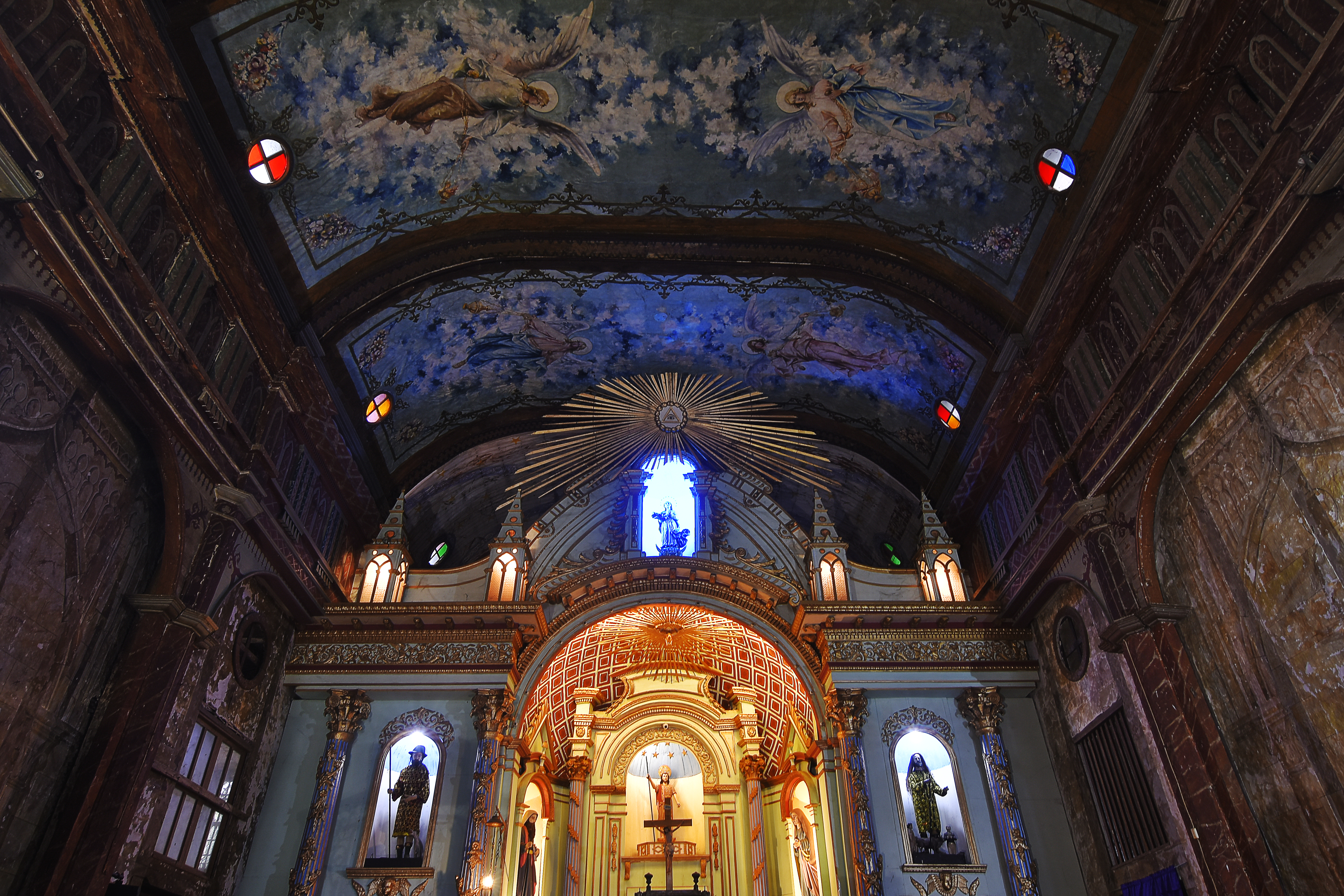
Retablo

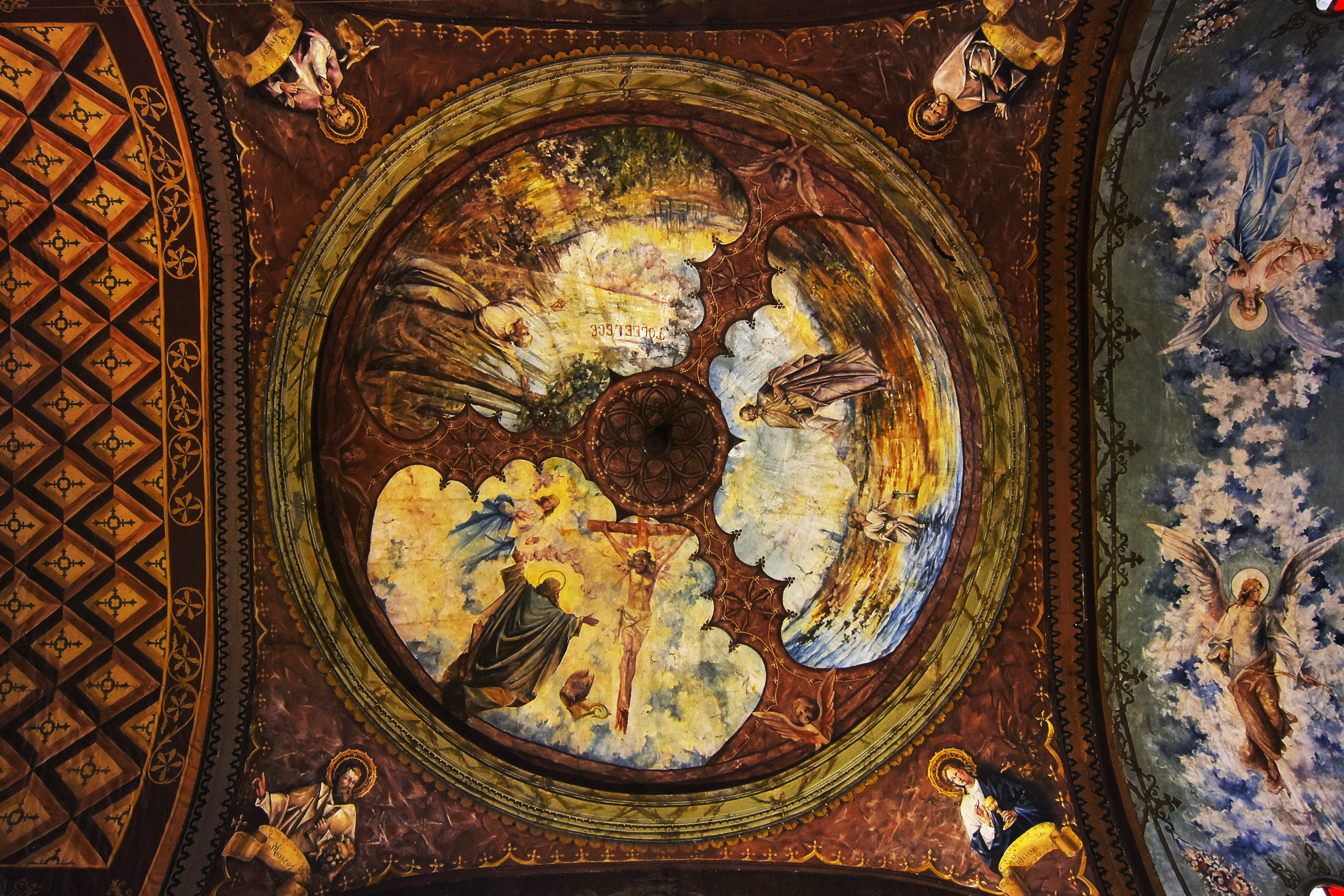
Ceiling of the church
