= Oroquieta =

Capital city of Misamis Occidental, Philippines

- Component city
- City of Oroquieta
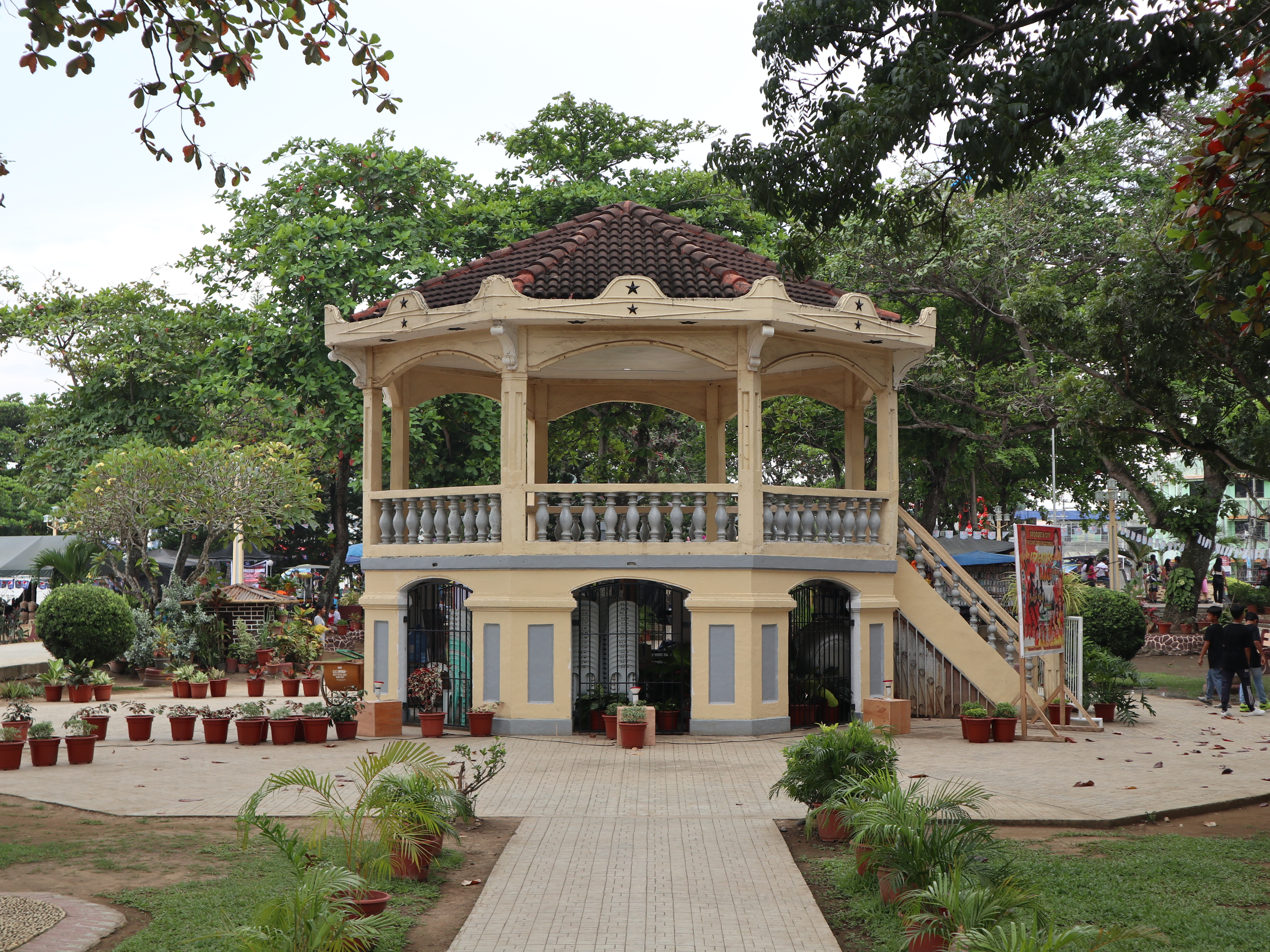
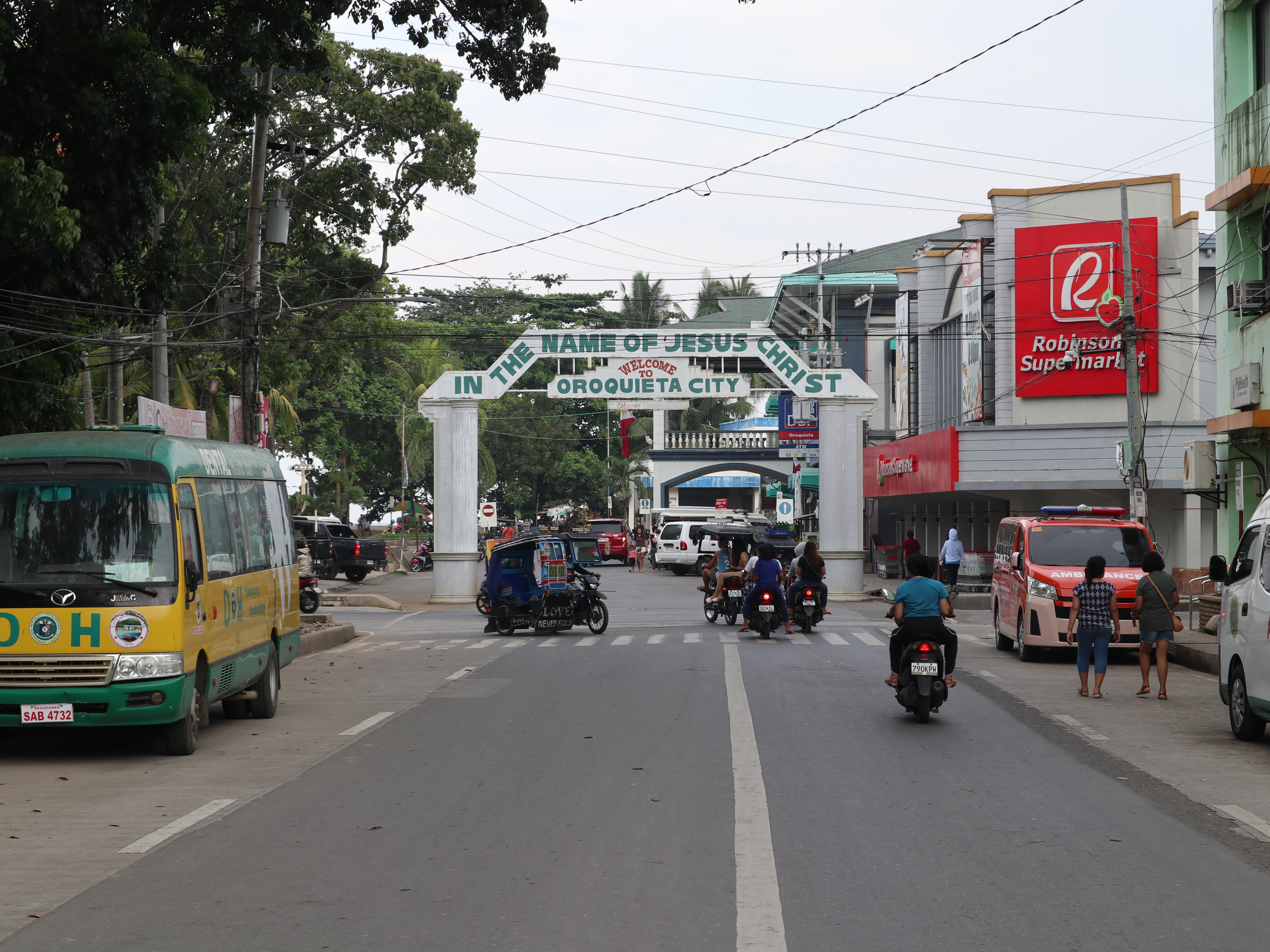
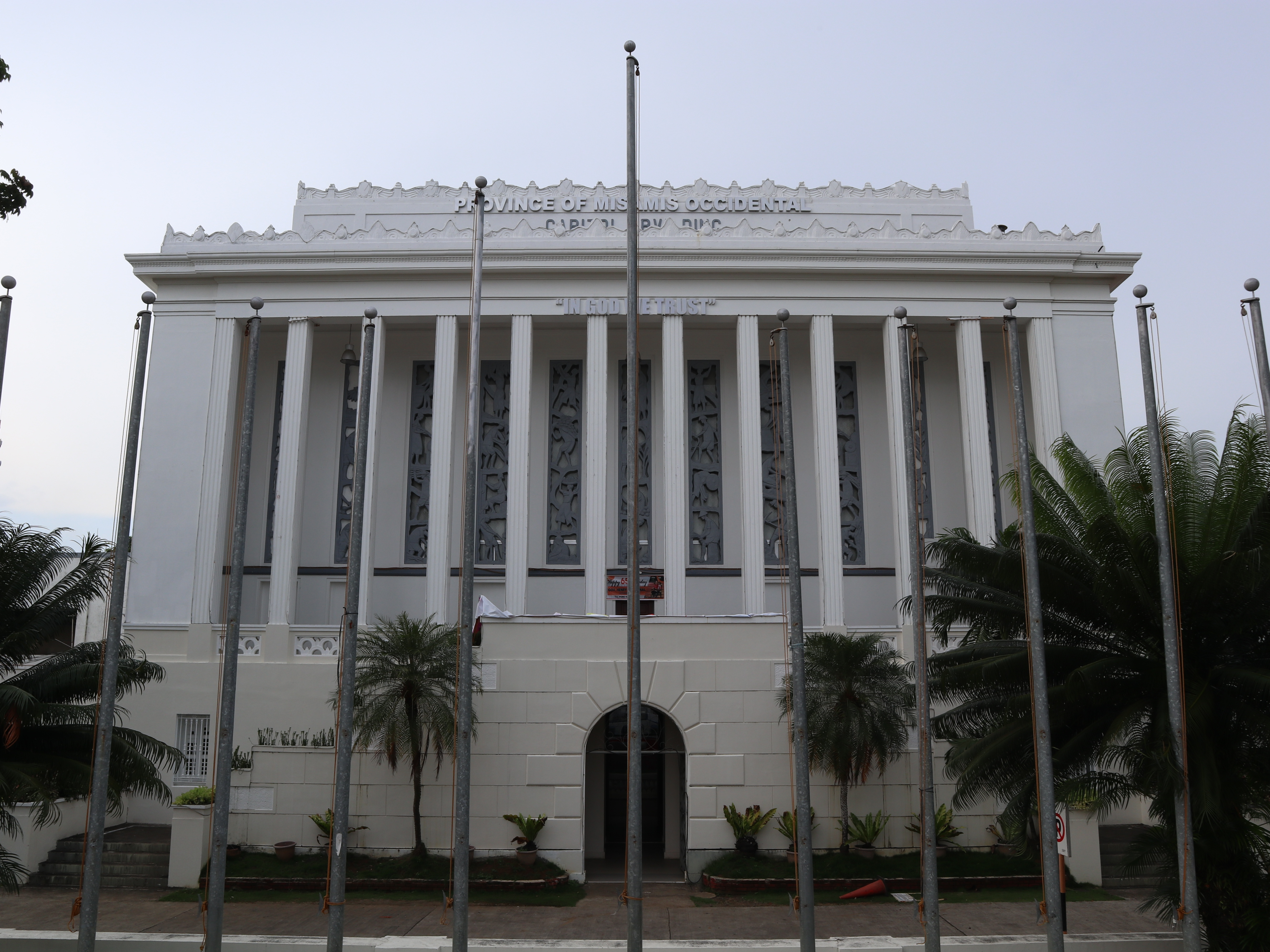
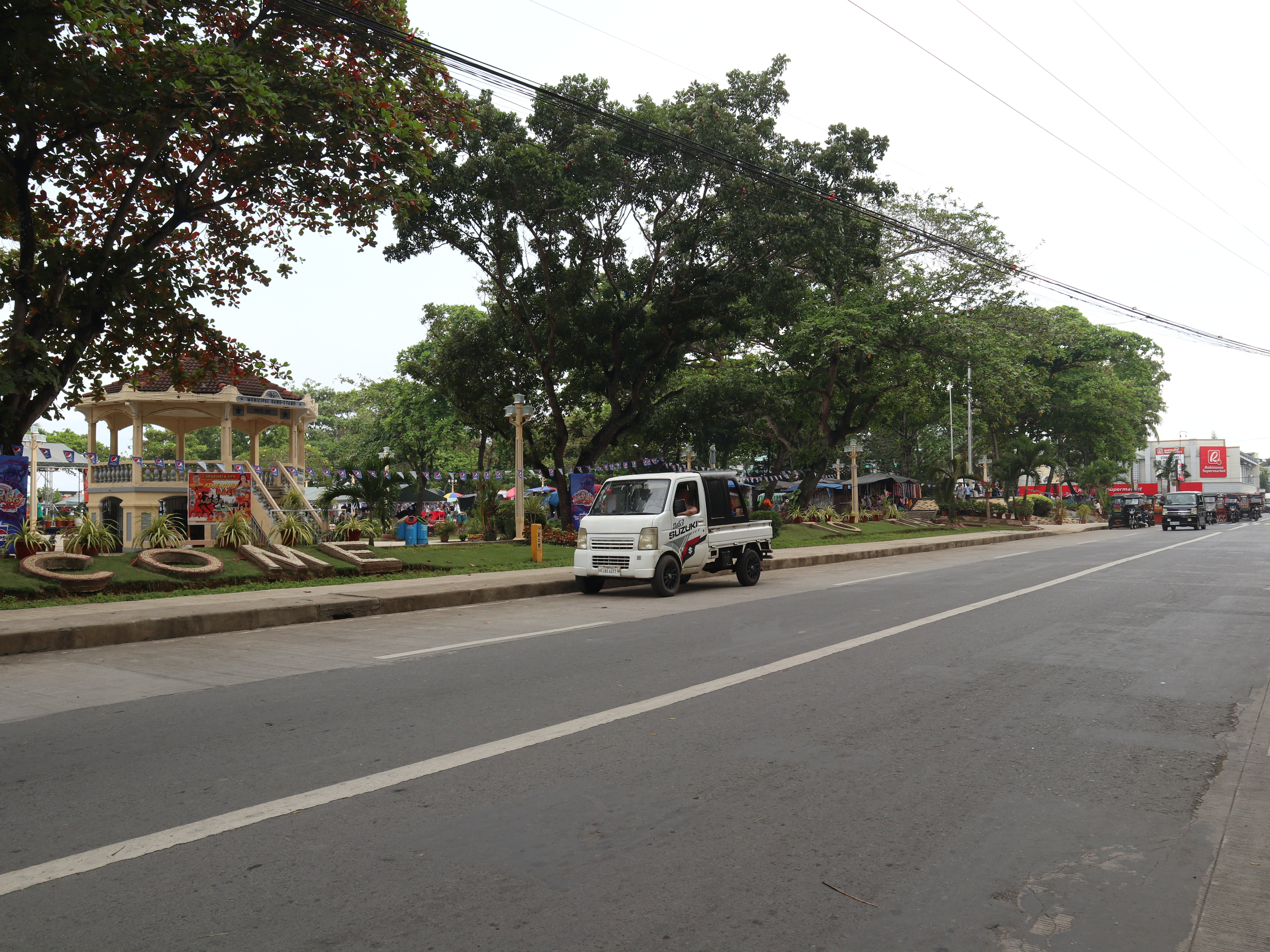
- Oroquieta Bandstand Poblacion Provincial Capitol City Plaza Holy Rosary Parish

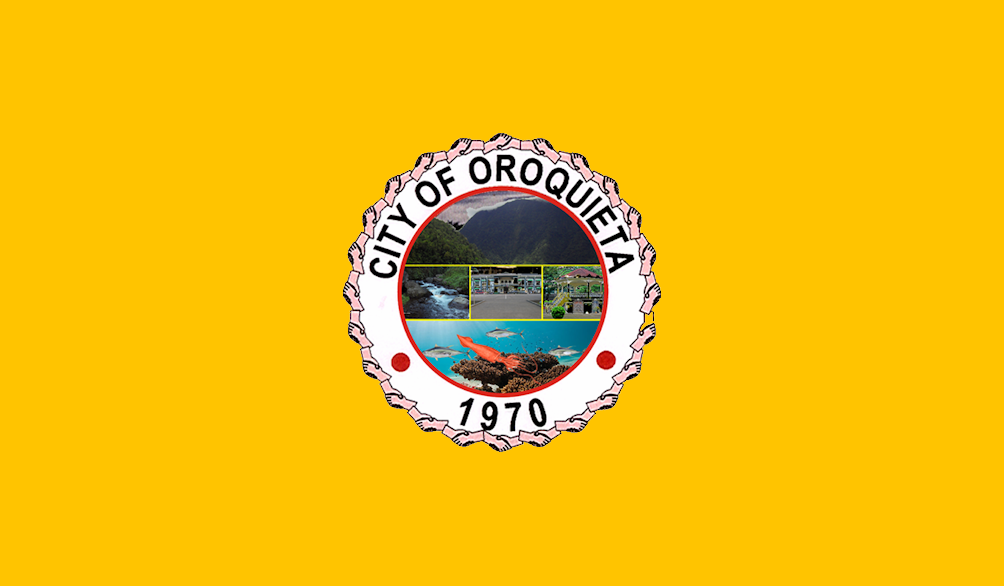
- Flag Seal
- Nickname: City of Good Life
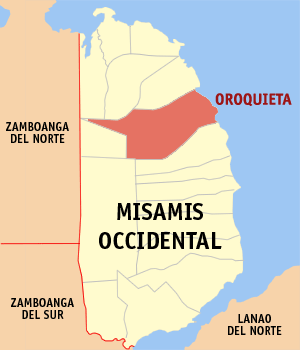
- Map of Misamis Occidental with Oroquieta highlighted
- Interactive map of Oroquieta
- Location within the Philippines
- Coordinates: 8°29′N 123°48′E
- Country: Philippines
- Region: Northern Mindanao
- Province: Misamis Occidental
- District: 1st district
- Founded: 1880
- Cityhood: January 1, 1970
- Barangays: 47 (see Barangays)

Government
  - Type: Sangguniang Panlungsod
  - Mayor: Lemuel Meyrick M. Acosta (Asenso Pinoy Party)
  - Vice Mayor: Aurora Virginia M. Almonte (Asenso Pinoy Party)
  - Representative: Jason P. Almonte (NP)
  - City Council: Members: Vincent J. Guantero (ASPIN); Joel B. Aclao (NP); Sol Jude D. Gamalinda, C.E. (NP); Ret. Col. Isaias U. Claros Jr., PA (NP); Joel A. Fernandez (ASPIN); Jessie "Jecjec" S. Amboang (ASPIN); Aileen "Ai-Ai" M. Taladua, RPh (ASPIN); Arthur Q. Enanoria, DMD (ASPIN); Noel B. Undag Sr. (ASPIN); Diosibel M. Maghinay (ASPIN)
  - Electorate: 53,985 voters (2025)

Area
  - Total: 237.88 km^{2} (91.85 sq mi)
- Elevation: 138 m (453 ft)
- Highest elevation: 1,925 m (6,316 ft)
- Lowest elevation: 0 m (0 ft)

Population (2024 census)
  - Total: 71,373
  - Density: 300.04/km^{2} (777.09/sq mi)
  - Households: 17,326
- Demonym: Oroquietanon

Economy
  - Income class: 3rd city income class
  - Poverty incidence: 20.36% (2023)
  - Revenue: ₱ 920.3 million (2024)
  - Assets: ₱ 3,605 million (2024)
  - Expenditure: ₱ 722.7 million (2024)
  - Liabilities: ₱ 518.6 million (2024)

Service provider
  - Electricity: Misamis Occidental 1 Electric Cooperative (MOELCI 1)
- Time zone: UTC+8 (PST)
- ZIP code: 7207
- PSGC: 104209000
- IDD : area code: +63 (0)88
- Native languages: Subanon; Cebuano; Tagalog
- Catholic diocese: Archdiocese of Ozamis
- Patron saint: Our Lady of the Holy Rosary
- Website: www.oroquietacity.gov.ph

Oroquieta (originally known as Layawan), officially the City of Oroquieta (Cebuano: Dakbayan sa Oroquieta; Tagalog: Lungsod ng Oroquieta), is a component city and capital of the province of Misamis Occidental, Philippines. According to the 2024 census, it has a population of 71,373 people.

== Etymology ==
Oroquieta is named after the Basque settlement of Orokieta (spelled "Oroquieta" in Spanish) in Navarra, Spain. It was the birthplace of the Franciscan Friar Tomás Casado, who was the first Spanish parish priest of Oroquieta and was an important figure in its early foundation.

== History ==
The settlement was originally known as Layawan, a visita of the parroquia of Jimenez in the province of Misamis. Layawan (literally "the meandering one") is named after the Layawan River which flows through the settlement.

Its name was changed to Oroquieta in 1884 when it was granted township by the Spanish Crown, as recommended by Fray Juan Gomez, the Father Provincial of the Recollects, and Martin Garcia y Alcocer, the Bishop of Cebu.

It was named after the Basque settlement of Oroquieta in Navarra, Spain. The original Oroquieta was the birthplace of the Franciscan Friar Tomás Casado, who was the first (and last) Spanish parish priest of Oroquieta. Fray Casado figured prominently in helping to establish Oroquieta as a model pueblo, finishing numerous infrastructural projects including a convent, a school, bridges, roads, houses, a cemetery, and a kiosk (which still stands to this day). Fray Casado also helped establish an abaca industry and purchased an abaca processing machine to provide livelihoods for the locals. Unlike the corrupt Spanish friars common during this period, Casado was motivated by a genuine desire to improve the lives of its residents. He hoped to turn Oroquieta into la pueblo de la buena vida ("the town of the good life").

However, Fray Casado had to leave Oroquieta under the orders of his superiors in 1898, when the Philippine Revolution made it too dangerous to remain. Spain ceded the Philippines to the United States shortly afterwards, as part of the negotiations after the Spanish–American War.

During the American occupation, the territory was retained by 1903 when the number of municipalities in the then-undivided Misamis decreased through Act No. 951, issued on October 21; but was reduced by Executive Order No. 67, series of 1916, issued by Governor-General Francis Burton Harrison, where four barrios were organized into the new municipality of Aloran.

Oroquieta became the capital (cabecera) on January 6, 1930. As capital town, people of various neighboring provinces came and inhabited in the place where they earn their living through fishing, farming, merchandising and other forms of businesses. Soon afterwards its income increased simultaneously with increase in population, resulting from southward migration from Luzon and Visayas to the area.

In 1942, Oroquieta was made the capital of the free Philippines by the recognized guerrillas and later the ongoing troops of the Philippine Commonwealth Army. (Personal interview with the late Atty. Vicente Blanco, Municipal Mayor during the Japanese Occupation) During this time, President Manuel L. Quezon, together with Sergio Osmeña Sr., a bodyguard and Major Manuel Nieto Sr., landed in Oroquieta after their evacuation from Corregidor to Australia.

The seat of government of the Free Philippines then was the Capitol. The Free Philippine Government was then issuing Misamis Occidental emergency notes. President Quezon, upon knowing that Oroquieta was made a capital of the Free Philippines and that the town was issuing emergency notes, authorized the Printing of the Mindanao emergency note.

=== Cityhood ===
Oroquieta was created a city under Republic Act 5518 and inaugurated as a chartered city on January 1, 1970. The charter converting the municipality of Oroquieta into a city was signed by President Marcos on June 25, 1969, in the presence of then City Mayor Ciriaco C. Pastrano, with the newly elected councilors and other city officials.

== Geography ==
Oroquieta City is bounded on the south by Aloran and the north by Lopez Jaena. On the eastern side is Iligan Bay, with Concepcion on the southwest and Sapang Dalaga on the northwest. Lowland plains and coastal lowlands are located in the city's eastern side while highlands and mountains tower over its western side.

The city occupies roughly 26,393 hectares (65,220 acres), the majority of which comprises the mountain barangays of Mialen, Toliyok, and Sebucal, averaging less than a thousand hectares per Barangay, the 47 barangays of the city outsize its urbanized counterparts.

=== Climate ===
Climate data for Oroquieta City, Misamis Occidental
Month	Jan	Feb	Mar	Apr	May	Jun	Jul	Aug	Sep	Oct	Nov	Dec	Year
Mean daily maximum °C (°F)	28 (82)	28 (82)	29 (84)	31 (88)	31 (88)	30 (86)	30 (86)	30 (86)	30 (86)	30 (86)	29 (84)	28 (82)	30 (85)
Mean daily minimum °C (°F)	23 (73)	23 (73)	23 (73)	23 (73)	24 (75)	24 (75)	24 (75)	24 (75)	24 (75)	24 (75)	24 (75)	23 (73)	24 (74)
Average precipitation mm (inches)	69 (2.7)	44 (1.7)	37 (1.5)	29 (1.1)	87 (3.4)	137 (5.4)	131 (5.2)	141 (5.6)	143 (5.6)	134 (5.3)	68 (2.7)	53 (2.1)	1,073 (42.3)
Average rainy days	9.9	7.6	7.4	8.1	21.6	26.5	26.4	26.6	25.8	24.3	15.1	10.4	209.7
Source: Meteoblue (modeled/calculated data, not measured locally)

=== Barangays ===
Oroquieta City is politically subdivided into 47 barangays. Each barangay consists of puroks, while some have sitios.

- Apil
- Binuangan
- Bolibol
- Buenavista
- Bunga
- Buntawan
- Burgos
- Canubay
- Ciriaco C. Pastrano (Nilabo)
- Clarin Settlement
- Dolipos Bajo
- Dolipos Alto
- Dulapo
- Dullan Norte
- Dullan Sur
- Layawan
- Lower Lamac
- Lower Langcangan
- Lower Loboc
- Lower Rizal
- Malindang
- Mialen
- Mobod
- Paypayan
- Pines
- Poblacion I
- Poblacion II
- Proper Langcangan
- San Vicente Alto (Dagatan)
- San Vicente Bajo (Baybay Dagatan)
- Sebucal
- Senote
- Taboc Norte
- Taboc Sur
- Talairon
- Talic
- Toliyok
- Tipan
- Tuyabang Alto
- Tuyabang Bajo
- Tuyabang Proper
- Upper Langcangan
- Upper Lamac
- Upper Loboc
- Upper Rizal (Tipalac)
- Victoria
- Villaflor (Transville)

== Demographics ==
Population census of Oroquieta

Year	Pop.	±% p.a.
1903	15,156	—
1918	18,014	+1.16%
1939	21,523	+0.85%
1948	22,837	+0.66%
1960	29,477	+2.15%
1970	38,575	+2.72%

Year	Pop.	±% p.a.
1975	42,497	+1.96%
1980	47,328	+2.18%
1990	52,500	+1.04%
1995	56,012	+1.22%
2000	59,843	+1.43%
2007	65,349	+1.22%

Year	Pop.	±% p.a.
2010	68,945	+1.97%
2015	70,757	+0.50%
2020	72,301	+0.46%
2024	71,373	−0.31%

Source: Philippine Statistics Authority

According to the 2024 census, Oroquieta has a population of 71,373 people, with a density of 300 inhabitants per square kilometre or 780 inhabitants per square mile.

== Economy ==
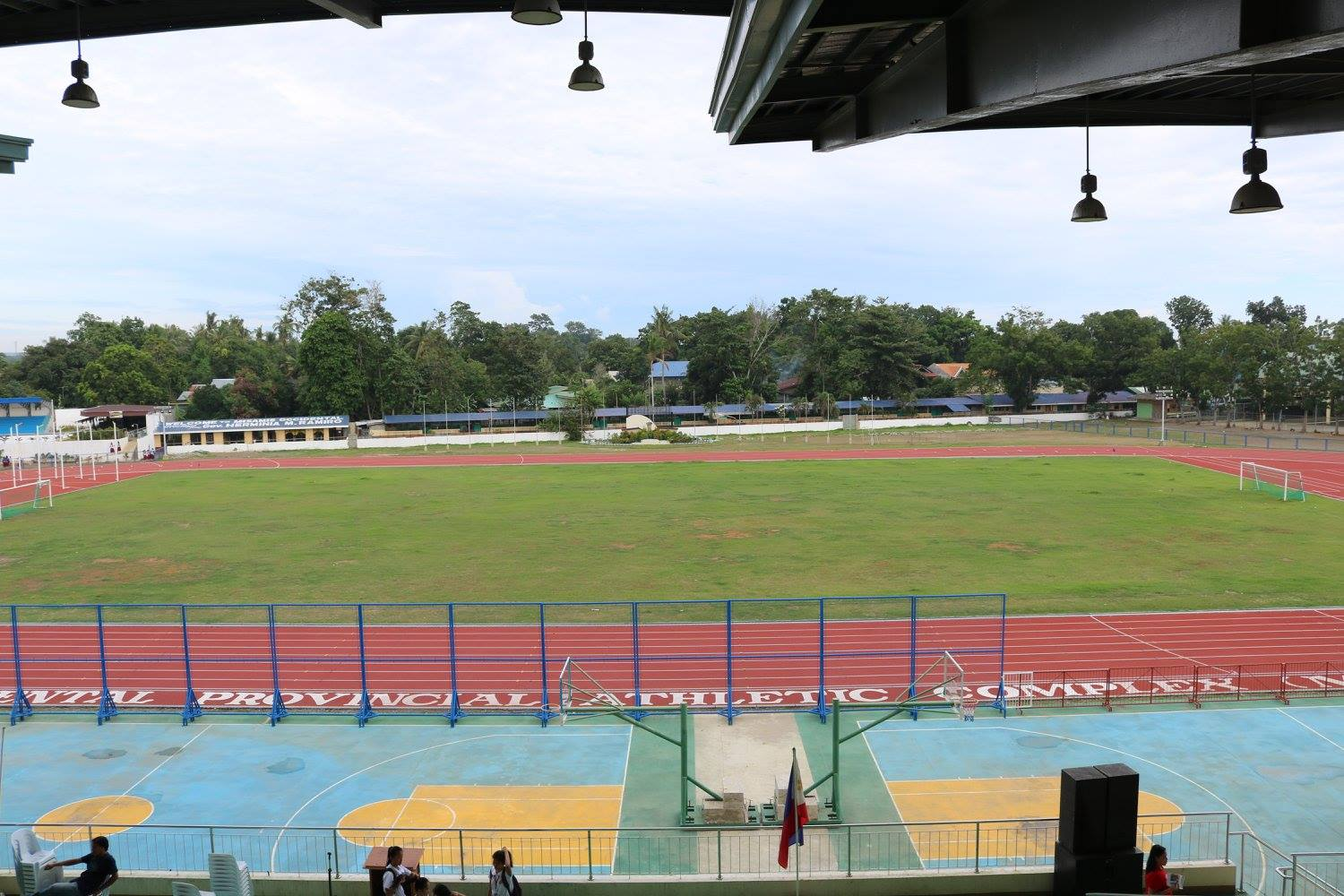
Misamis Occidental Provincial Athletic Complex located in Oroquieta City

Poverty incidence of Oroquieta (%)

Source: Philippine Statistics Authority

The groundbreaking ceremony and construction of the first mall in Oroquieta City was started in April 2024. The mall is located in Purok 1, Villaflor.

Starlite Ferries, a maritime company under the Chelsea Logistics Groups, marked its 4th route when it officially opened the new route connecting Oroquieta City to Larena, Tagbilaran, and Cebu City, and vice versa on April 28. The Starlite Ferries are stationed at the San Vicente Bajo Port in Oroquieta City.

== Government ==
Old City Hall

Oroquieta City Council (2025–2028):

- Mayor: Lemuel Meyrick M. Acosta, IE
- Vice mayor and Sanggunian presiding officer: Aurora Virginia "Jie-jie" M. Almonte
- Representative, Misamis Occidental 1st District: Jason P. Almonte
- Councilors:
  - Vincent J. Guantero
  - Don Ian George M. Almonte
  - Jessie "Jecjec" S. Amboang
  - Joel A. Fernandez
  - Aileen "Ai-Ai" M. Taladua, RPh
  - Jade "Pikot" V. Catane
  - Noel B. Undag Sr.
  - Arthur Q. Enanoria, DMD
  - Diosibel M. Maghinay
  - Henry "Nonoy" F. Regalado Jr.
- ABC president: Nanieth Maerl S. Bandala-Acosta
- SK Federation president: James Anthony N. Sy
- IPMR: Jolly T. Gumolon

== Healthcare ==
Hospitals and healthcare facilities:

- Misamis Occidental Provincial Hospital
- St. Therese Hospital
- Dignum Foundation Hospital
- Oroquieta Community Hospital
- Tamola-Tan Medical Center

== Education ==
Students coming from neighboring provinces of Lanao del Norte, Zamboanga Sibugay, Zamboanga del Sur, Zamboanga del Norte, and neighboring cities and municipalities within the province of Misamis Occidental come to Oroquieta to pursue their college and education.

Universities and colleges:

- Lyceum Professional Institute - Tuyabang Alto
- Misamis University (MU) - Ozamiz St., Poblacion 1
- University of Science and Technology of Southern Philippines (USTP) - Rizal St., Mobod Highway
- Southeast Asian Institute Oroquieta City Campus - National Highway, Upper Rizal
- Dr. Solomon U. Molina College (DSUMC) - Independence St., Villaflor
- Oroquieta Agro Industrial School (OAIS) - Villaflor
- Southern Capital College (SCC) - Juan Luna St., Poblacion 2
- Misamis Occidental Technological Institute (MOTI) - Pastrano St., Poblacion 1
- Deor 'N Dune Academe School of Technology - Rizal Highway, Canubay
- National Institute for Technical Excellence, Inc. (NITEX) - De Barras Building, Barrientos St., Poblacion 2

Secondary schools:

- Misamis Occidental National High School
- Talairon National High School
- Oroquieta City National High School
- Mobod Integrated School
- Misamis Occidental Science and Technology High School
- Senote National High School
- Rizal National High School
- Bunga National High School
- Holy Rosary School (formerly Stella Maris College)

== Notable personalities ==
- Allen Dizon, actor

== See also ==
- Cagayan de Oro
