= Misamis University =

Private university in Misamis Occidental, Philippines

- Former names: Kolambugan Academy (1929–1931); Misamis Institute (1931–1955); Misamis Colleges (1955–1977); Misamis University (1977–present)
- Motto: Educating for the Future
- Type: Private non-sectarian institution
- Established: June 1929 (Ozamiz); January 1967 (Oroquieta)
- Affiliations: PACUCOA, CHED, ISO, MARINA, CISCO
- Chairman: Dr. Ricardo F. De Castro
- President: Karen Belina F. De Leon, MD, Ed.D.
- Administrative staff: 3945
- Students: 8,000
- Undergraduates: 1235
- Postgraduates: 3562
- Location: Ozamiz City; Oroquieta City, Misamis Occidental, Philippines; 8°09′00″N 123°50′28″E
- Campus: Urban, 7.5 hectares campus in HT Feliciano Street, Ozamiz City J. Ozamiz Cor. Independence St. Poblacion 1, Oroquieta City
- Colors: Golden Yellow, Black, and White
- Nickname: MU
- Website: www.mu.edu.ph
- Location in Mindanao Location in the Philippines

Misamis University (also referred to as MU) is a privately owned, non-sectarian, non-profit educational institution in Ozamiz, Misamis Occidental, Philippines. It was founded by Dr. Hilarion Feliciano and Doña Maria Mercado Feliciano in 1929. Misamis University is currently the only autonomous university granted an ISO 9001:2015 Management System Certified granted by Det Norske Veritas-Germanischer Lloyd Business Assurance by the Commission on Higher Education (CHED) in Northwestern Mindanao, and awarded by the Philippine Association of Colleges and Universities Commission on Accreditation as the Most Number of Accredited Programs in Region X.

Misamis University caters to more than 8,000 students every year in its 7.5 hectare campus in Ozamiz City, as well as another campus in Oroquieta City, Misamis Occidental.

The University has achieved Deregulated Status from CHED which means it is free from the agency's monitoring, has access to grants and financial incentives and decide the development of their curriculum. CHED also recognizes Misamis University as a Center of Development for Criminology and for Information Technology.

On March 12, 2025, a Memorandum of Understanding (MOU) was concluded between Misamis University (MU) and the Philippine Council for Health Research and Development (DOST-PCHRD), an organization under the Department of Science and Technology, officially launching a collaboration in health sciences research.

The University of the Philippines Los Baños has formally partnered with Misamis University, marking a milestone for Philippine higher education. In October 2024, the formal Memorandum of Understanding (MOU) was signed, establishing a partnership devoted to promoting education, research, and community involvement.
