= Lopez Jaena =

Municipality in Misamis Occidental, Philippines

- Municipality
- Municipality of Lopez Jaena
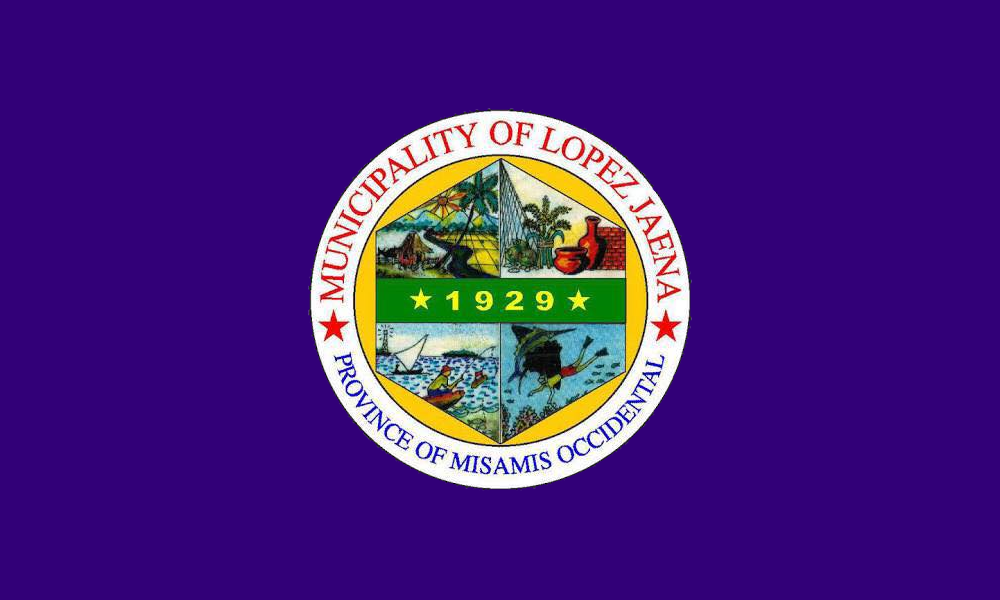
- Flag

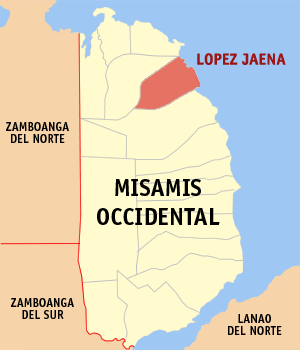
- Map of Misamis Occidental with Lopez Jaena highlighted
- Interactive map of Lopez Jaena
- Location within the Philippines
- Coordinates: 8°33′00″N 123°46′00″E
- Country: Philippines
- Region: Northern Mindanao
- Province: Misamis Occidental
- District: 1st district
- Founded: August 1, 1929
- Named for: Graciano López Jaena
- Barangays: 28 (see Barangays)

Government
  - Type: Sangguniang Bayan
  - Mayor: Andrea Cherry Pink L. Gutierrez-Cagas (ASPIN)
  - Vice Mayor: Abundio P. Gerbese (ASPIN)
  - Representative: Jason P. Almonte (NP)
  - Municipal Council: Members: Herminio C. Aca-ac; Fe Francisca D. Taclob; Fidel A. Cale; Maria Aileen M. Bantilan; Rufino Philip T. Magsayo; Roland B. Magsayo; Lloyd G. Ozaraga; Godofredo R. Pacana Jr.
  - Electorate: 18,771 voters (2025)

Area
  - Total: 94.70 km^{2} (36.56 sq mi)
- Elevation: 23 m (75 ft)
- Highest elevation: 196 m (643 ft)
- Lowest elevation: 0 m (0 ft)

Population (2024 census)
  - Total: 25,806
  - Density: 272.5/km^{2} (705.8/sq mi)
  - Households: 6,282

Economy
  - Income class: 3rd municipal income class
  - Poverty incidence: 34.75% (2023)
  - Revenue: ₱ 145.5 million (2024)
  - Assets: ₱ 446.9 million (2024)
  - Expenditure: ₱ 145.4 million (2024)
  - Liabilities: ₱ 95.83 million (2024)

Service provider
  - Electricity: Misamis Occidental 1 Electric Cooperative (MOELCI 1)
- Time zone: UTC+8 (PST)
- ZIP code: 7208
- PSGC: 1004208000
- IDD : area code: +63 (0)88
- Native languages: Subanon; Cebuano; Tagalog
- Website: www.lopezjaenamisocc.gov.ph

Lopez Jaena, officially the Municipality of Lopez Jaena (Cebuano: Lungsod sa Lopez Jaena; Subanen: Benwa D' Lopez Jaena; Tagalog: Bayan ng Lopez Jaena), is a municipality in the province of Misamis Occidental, Philippines and a suburb of neighboring Oroquieta City. According to the 2024 census, it has a population of 25,806 people.

== Geography ==
=== Barangays ===
Lopez Jaena is politically subdivided into 28 barangays. Each barangay consists of puroks while some have sitios.

- Alegria
- Bagong Silang
- Biasong
- Bonifacio
- Burgos
- Dalacon
- Dampalan
- Estante
- Hasa-an
- Katipa
- Luzaran
- Macalibre Alto
- Macalibre Bajo
- Mahayahay
- Manguehan
- Mansabay Bajo
- Molatuhan Alto
- Molatuhan Bajo
- Peniel
- Eastern Poblacion
- Puntod
- Rizal
- Sibugon
- Sibula
- Don Andres Soriano
- Mabas
- Mansabay Alto
- Western Poblacion

=== Climate ===
Climate data for Lopez Jaena, Misamis Occidental
Month	Jan	Feb	Mar	Apr	May	Jun	Jul	Aug	Sep	Oct	Nov	Dec	Year
Mean daily maximum °C (°F)	27 (81)	28 (82)	29 (84)	31 (88)	31 (88)	30 (86)	30 (86)	30 (86)	30 (86)	30 (86)	29 (84)	28 (82)	29 (85)
Mean daily minimum °C (°F)	23 (73)	23 (73)	23 (73)	23 (73)	24 (75)	24 (75)	23 (73)	23 (73)	24 (75)	24 (75)	23 (73)	23 (73)	23 (74)
Average precipitation mm (inches)	69 (2.7)	44 (1.7)	37 (1.5)	29 (1.1)	87 (3.4)	137 (5.4)	131 (5.2)	141 (5.6)	143 (5.6)	134 (5.3)	68 (2.7)	53 (2.1)	1,073 (42.3)
Average rainy days	9.9	7.6	7.4	8.1	21.6	26.5	26.4	26.6	25.8	24.3	15.1	10.4	209.7
Source: Meteoblue

== Demographics ==
Population census of Lopez Jaena

Year	Pop.	±% p.a.
1939	8,379	—
1948	9,757	+1.71%
1960	13,221	+2.56%
1970	16,464	+2.22%
1975	17,672	+1.43%
1980	18,949	+1.40%
1990	19,912	+0.50%

Year	Pop.	±% p.a.
1995	20,444	+0.50%
2000	20,948	+0.52%
2007	22,120	+0.75%
2010	23,767	+2.65%
2015	25,055	+1.01%
2020	25,507	+0.38%
2024	25,806	+0.28%

Source: Philippine Statistics Authority

In the 2024 census, the population of Lopez Jaena was 25,806 people, with a density of 270 inhabitants per square kilometre or 700 inhabitants per square mile.

== Economy ==
Poverty incidence of Lopez Jaena (%)

Source: Philippine Statistics Authority
