= University of Science and Technology of Southern Philippines =

Public university in Misamis Oriental, Philippines

- Pamantasan ng Agham at Teknolohiya ng Dakong Timog ng Pilipinas (Filipino)
- Former names: Misamis Oriental Trade School (1927–1952), Mindanao School of Arts and Trades (1952–1978), Don Mariano Marcos Memorial Polytechnic State College (1978–1991), Mindanao Polytechnic State College (1991–2009), Mindanao University of Science and Technology (2009–2016), Misamis Oriental State College of Agriculture and Technology (1963–2016)
- Motto: Advancing a Sustainable Future
- Type: State university
- Established: 1927 (MUST lineage); 2016 (USTP establishment)
- Academic affiliations: Philippine Association of State Universities and Colleges (PASUC), Mindanao Association of State Colleges and Universities Foundation, Inc. (MASCUF)
- Chancellor: List: Alubijid Campus Dr. Lory Liza D. Bulay-og; Cagayan de Oro Campus Atty. Dionel O. Albina; Claveria Campus Dr. Renato O. Arazo; Villanueva Campus Colbert G. Rabaya, MBA; Balubal Campus Dr. Dennis A. Apuan; Jasaan Campus Dr. Ruel S. Salvador; Oroquieta Campus Dr. Glorimer L. Clarin; Panaon Campus Dr. Leny Quiawan-Añasco
- President: Ambrosio B. Cultura II, Ph.D.
- Faculty: 1,594 (Jul 2022)
- Students: 20,909 (Aug 2021)
- Undergraduates: 20,213 (Aug 2021)
- Postgraduates: 696 (Aug 2021)
- Location: Alubijid, Misamis Oriental, Philippines (Main); Claveria, Misamis Oriental, Philippines; C.M. Recto Ave., Lapasan, Cagayan de Oro, Philippines 8°29′09″N 124°39′23″E
- Campus: Urban (1 main campus with 3 major campuses and 4 satellite campuses)
- Publication: The Trailblazer
- Alma Mater Song: USTP Hymn
- Colors: Blue and Yellow
- Nickname: Trailblazers
- Website: www.ustp.edu.ph
- Location in Mindanao Location in the Philippines

The University of Science and Technology of Southern Philippines (USTP; Filipino: Pamantasan ng Agham at Teknolohiya ng Dakong Timog ng Pilipinas) is a state university system in the Philippines established on August 16, 2016, by virtue of Republic Act 10919 through the amalgamation of the Mindanao University of Science and Technology (MUST) in Cagayan de Oro and the Misamis Oriental State College of Agriculture and Technology (MOSCAT) in Claveria, Misamis Oriental. Both campuses are located in Northern Mindanao, considered the Gateway to Mindanao, which offers a strategic locational advantage for the institution to train and develop students from all the other regions of Mindanao.

It has maintained its Level IV Status as State University (Highest Distinction) as adjudged by the Commission on Higher Education (CHED) and the Department of Budget and Management (DBM) and continues to be one of the 19 leading state universities in the Philippines.

USTP's main campus is at the institution's 295.14-hectare (729.3-acre) property in Alubijid, Misamis Oriental. The university has a 7.3-hectare (18-acre) major campus in Cagayan de Oro. Its other major campus in Claveria has 101.37 hectares (250.5 acres) of rich agricultural land. The university also has satellite campuses in Jasaan, Villanueva, and Balubal (Cagayan de Oro), both in Misamis Oriental, and in Panaon and Oroquieta, both in Misamis Occidental.

== History ==
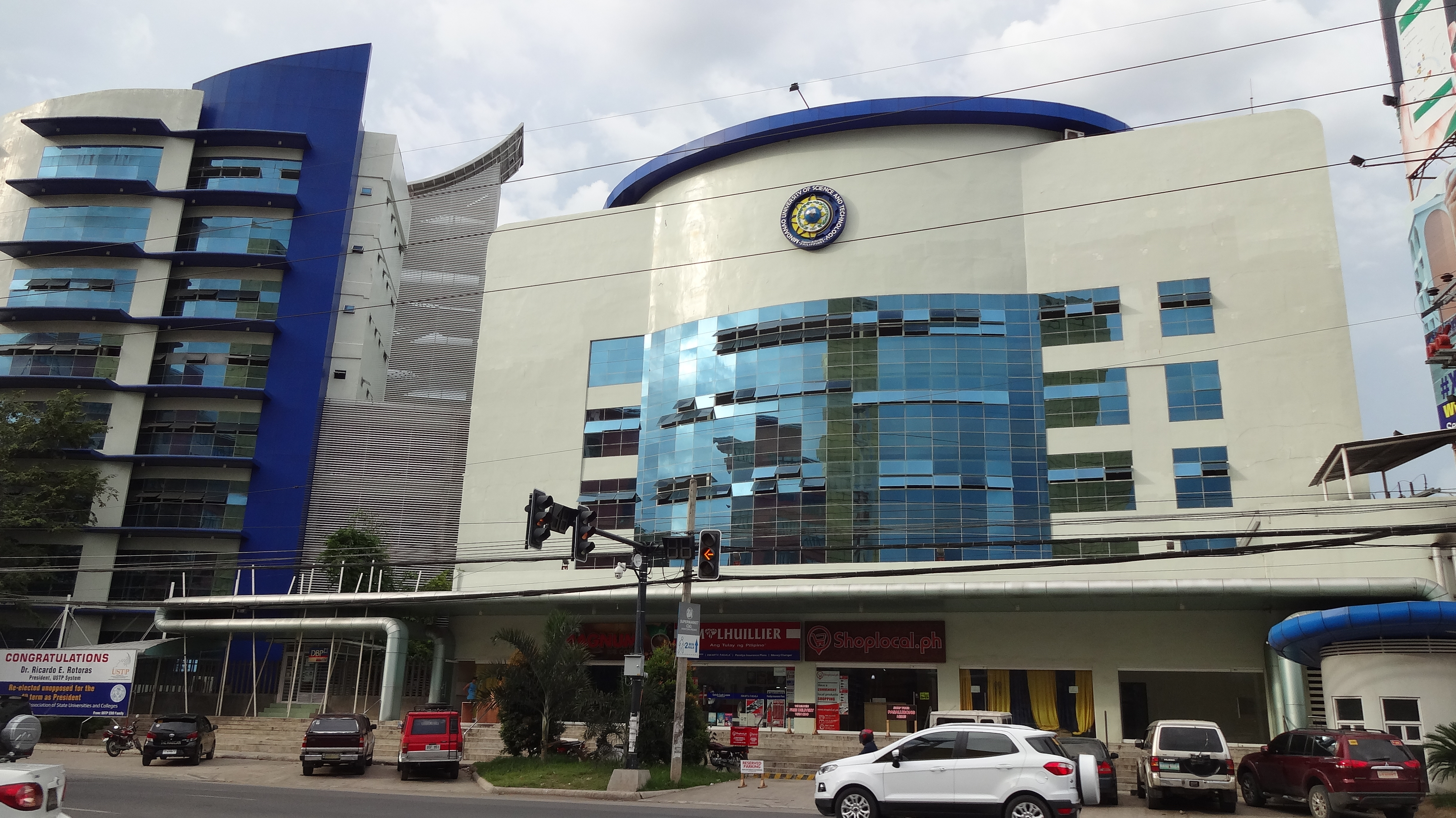
USTP Cagayan de Oro Campus

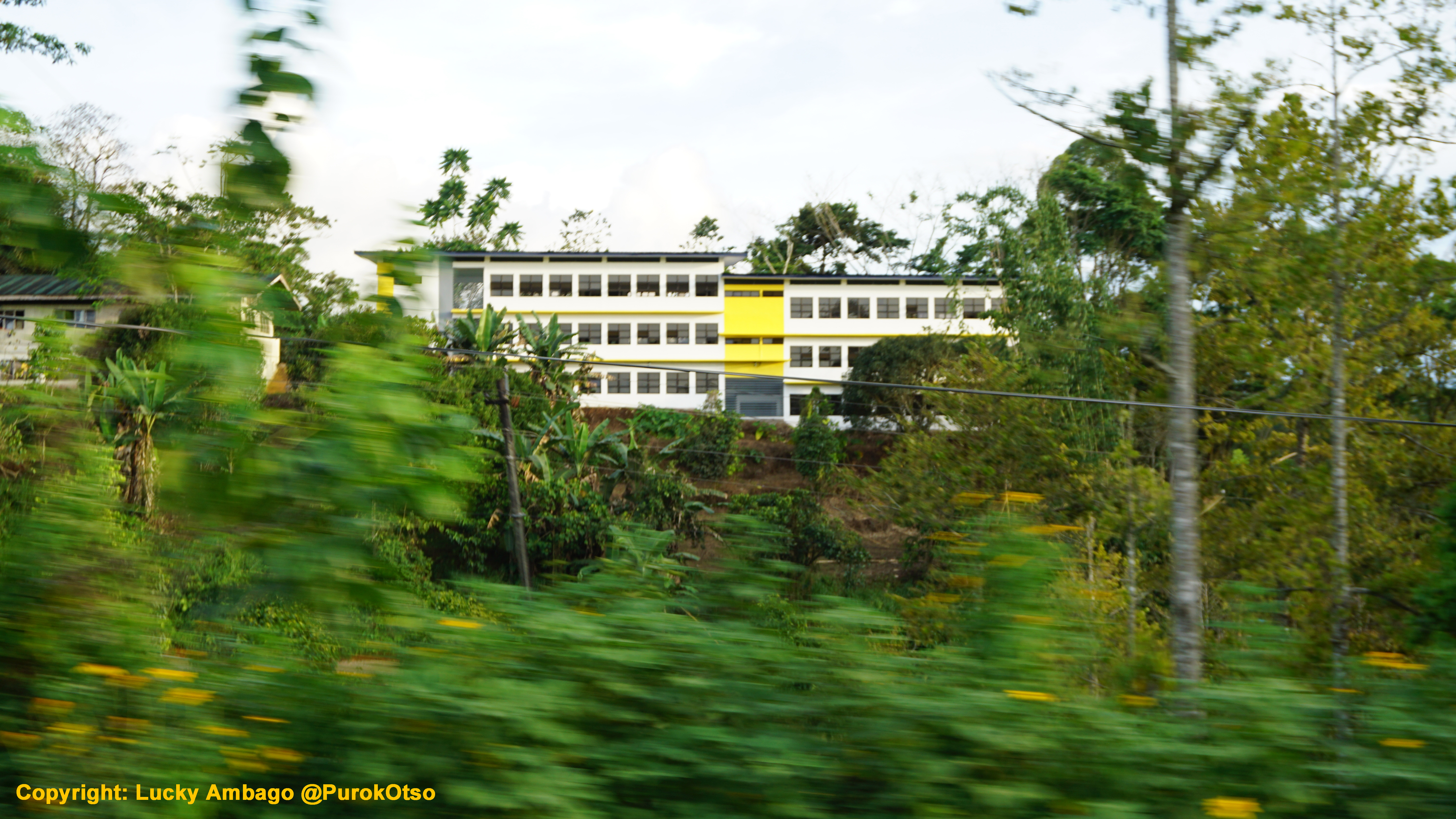
USTP Claveria Campus

Mindanao University of Science and Technology (MUST) has achieved its university status on January 7, 2009, after a long journey from its humble beginnings as a tradeschool in 1927.

The seed of MUST gained roots through the Pre-Commonwealth Act No. 3377 known as the Vocational Act of 1927. It was named as the Misamis Oriental Trade School (MOTS) which catered to the elementary level only but eventually in 1936, it opened a secondary four-year program.

In accordance to Republic Act No. 672 of 1952, MOTS became Mindanao School of Arts and Trades (MSAT) offering trade technical curriculum. Later in 1970, the school was authorized by virtue of RA 3959 to offer Bachelor of Science in Industrial Education and the Evening Opportunity Programs. In 1978, Presidential Decree 1431 upgraded the institution to Don Mariano Marcos Memorial Polytechnic State College. In 1991, it was renamed Mindanao Polytechnic State College (MPSC) and it also gained a new function – provide extension services.

The proposal to convert MPSC to MUST was presented in 1998, to the constituents of the institution and the general public. But the bill failed to prosper due to the moratorium on the creation of SUCs in the country (1998), Senate adjournment (2003); and the bill named HB 4914 was filed during the 13th Congress but was not finalized.

In 2006, Cong. Rufus Rodriguez filed House Bill 4914. On October 3, 2008, the historic Senate Public Hearing happened at the university gymnasium with Sen. Miguel Zubiri as the presiding officer. Eventually, the Senate and Congress approved the bill in December 2008.

On January 7, 2009, Republic Act No. 9519 was signed by President Gloria Macapagal-Arroyo at the MUST Gymnasium. The occasion was graced by senators, congressmen, local officials, civic organizations, GOs, private sectors, higher education institutions and stakeholders.

=== Milestones and timeline ===
- 1927 – Pre-Commonwealth Act No. 3377 known as the Vocational Act of 1927 established Misamis Oriental Trade School (MOTS) operating at the elementary level. In 1936, the intermediate program was replaced with the four-year secondary trade program.
- 1952 – Republic Act No. 672 converted MOTS into the Mindanao School of Arts and Trades (MSAT) offering two-year trade technical education. In 1970, Republic Act of 3959 authorized the offering of Bachelor of Science in Industrial Education and the Evening Opportunity Programs.
- 1978 – Presidential Decree 1431 converted MSAT to Don Mariano Marcos Memorial Polytechnic State College (DMMMPSC) with the mission "to provide quality relevant and trained human resources and to promote research supportive to the industrialization of Northern Mindanao."
- 1991 – Republic Act No. 7102 renamed DMMMPSC to Mindanao Polytechnic State College (MPSC) with the addition of the third function of the college — extension services — in the original mission.
- 1995 – Proposal for Mindanao University of Science and Technology was presented to the faculty and staff, students, PTA officials, and the general public. In 2002, Congressman John Michael C. Luzon of the Lone District of Cagayan de Oro filed House Bill No. 4582 for the conversion of MUST. The House Sub-Committee on Higher Education approved the bill in 2003.
- 2009 – Republic Act No. 9519 converted Mindanao Polytechnic State College (MPSC) into a university. MPSC will now be known as Mindanao University of Science and Technology (MUST).
- In February 2011, during the MUST days, Rufus Rodriguez said that a bill will be drafted to transform MUST into University of Science and Technology in the Philippines (USTP).
- On July 21, 2016, Republic Act No. 10919 established the University of Science and Technology of Southern Philippines (USTSP) that amalgamated the Mindanao University of Science and Technology (MUST) and Misamis Oriental State College of Agriculture and Technology (MOSCAT) transferring its main campus to the 292 hectares in Alubijid, Misamis Oriental.

== Accreditation ==
Accreditation of academic programs have been conducted by the Accrediting Agency of Chartered Colleges and Universities in the Philippines (AACCUP). Some programs reach as high as level III. The competent accreditation status provided MUST with COE and COD grants from CHED.

Program	Level (Accreditation status)	Duration of validity of Accreditation Status
Technician Teacher Education; Industrial Technology	Qualified for Level III	January 2008 - December 2008
Electrical Engineering; Electronics and Communication Engineering	Level III Accredited	August 2010
Information Technology; Mechanical Engineering	Level III Accredited	March 2013
Civil Engineering	Level I Accredited	December 1, 2005 - November 30, 2008
Computer Engineering; Science (Applied Physical Sciences); Science (Mathematical Science)	Level I Accredited	December 16, 2006 - December 15, 2009
Graduate: Doctoral (Educational Planning & Mgmt.); Graduate: Doctoral (Technology Education); Graduate: Doctoral (Mathematical Science); Graduate: Master's (MS-Teaching Mathematics); Graduate: Master's (Teaching App. Phy. Sci.); Graduate: Master's (Technician Teacher Education); Graduate: Master's (Educational Planning & Mgmt.); Graduate: Master's (MS-Math Sci.)	Level I Accredited	December 16, 2007 - December 15, 2010

Accreditation of academic programs have been conducted by the Accrediting Agency of Chartered Colleges and Universities in the Philippines (AACCUP). Some programs reach level II accreditation.

Program	Level (Accreditation status)	Duration of validity of Accreditation Status
Agricultural Teacher Education; Agricultural Technology	Level II Re-accredited	July 16, 2006–July 15, 2010
Secondary Teacher Education; Information Technology; Science (Biology); Food Technology; Technology in Environmental Management; Agroforestry Technology; Horticulture Management; Technology in Environmental Engineering	Level I Accredited	July 16, 2008–July 15, 2011

== See also ==
- MASCUF
- Mindanao Polytechnic State College
- Misamis Oriental State College of Agriculture and Technology
- Northern Mindanao
