= Jimenez, Misamis Occidental =

Municipality in Misamis Occidental, Philippines

Jimenez San Juan de Palilán
- Municipality
- Municipality of Jimenez
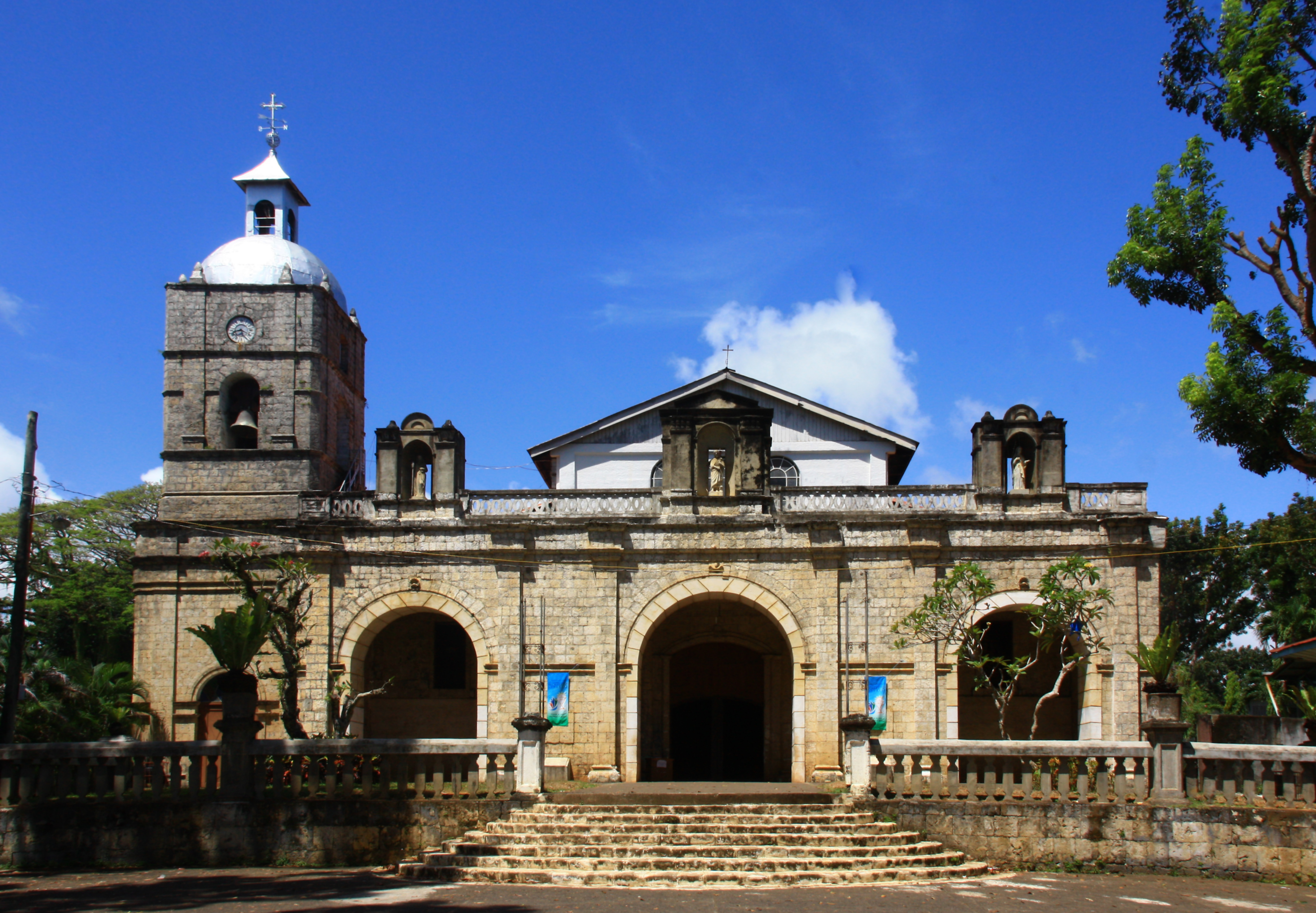
- Saint John the Baptist Parish

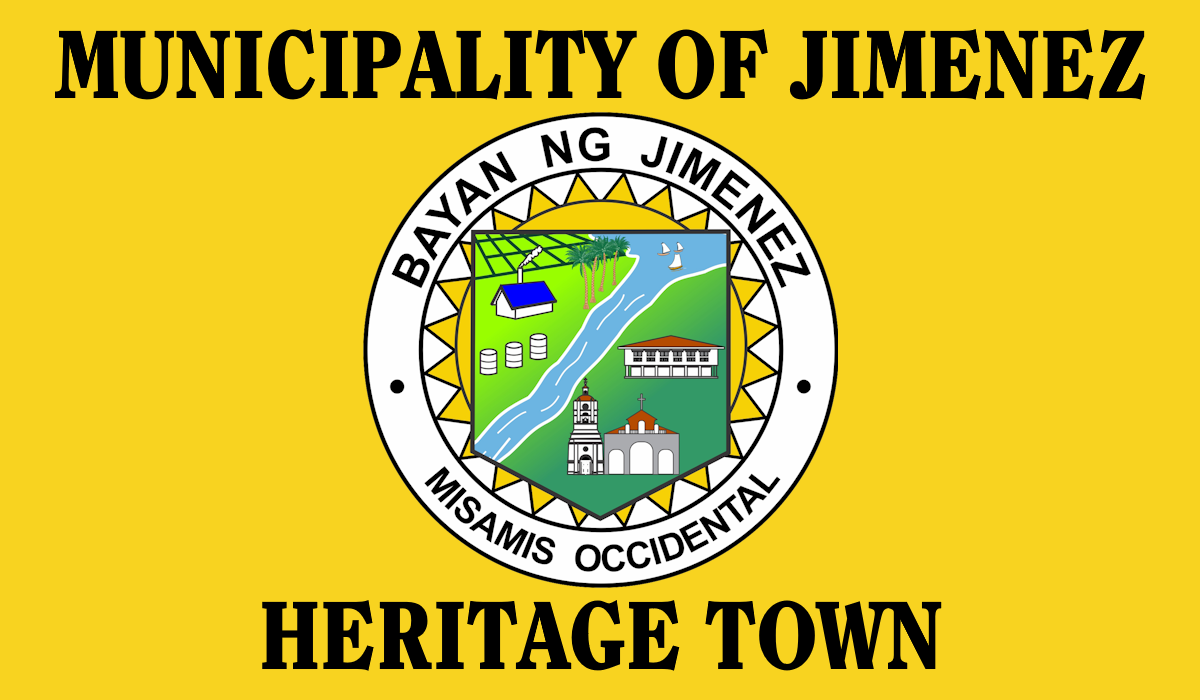
- Flag Seal

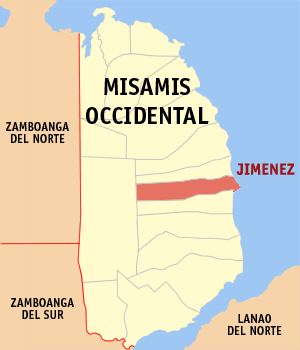
- Map of Misamis Occidental with Jimenez highlighted
- Interactive map of Jimenez
- Location within the Philippines
- Coordinates: 8°20′00″N 123°50′00″E
- Country: Philippines
- Region: Northern Mindanao
- Province: Misamis Occidental
- District: 1st district
- Founded: January 11, 1858
- Barangays: 24 (see Barangays)

Government
  - Type: Sangguniang Bayan
  - Mayor: Joselito C. Chiong (ASPIN)
  - Vice Mayor: Jim R. Delos Santos (ASPIN)
  - Representative: Jason P. Almonte (NP)
  - Municipal Council: Members: Rownil James M. Cabug; Zaldy G. Daminar; Dick L. Palangan; J'Maybel A. Delos Santos; Aljan Mar G. Bao-as; Josel Zyril S. Chiong; June Josephine-Lo D. Paradero; Rosarino P. Pendon
  - Electorate: 22,272 voters (2025)

Area
  - Total: 81.43 km^{2} (31.44 sq mi)
- Elevation: 41 m (135 ft)
- Highest elevation: 212 m (696 ft)
- Lowest elevation: 0 m (0 ft)

Population (2024 census)
  - Total: 29,265
  - Density: 359.4/km^{2} (930.8/sq mi)
  - Households: 7,042

Economy
  - Income class: 2nd municipal income class
  - Poverty incidence: 22.89% (2023)
  - Revenue: ₱ 188.3 million (2024)
  - Assets: ₱ 632.5 million (2024)
  - Expenditure: ₱ 200.3 million (2024)
  - Liabilities: ₱ 131.1 million (2024)

Service provider
  - Electricity: Misamis Occidental 2 Electric Cooperative (MOELCI 2)
- Time zone: UTC+8 (PST)
- ZIP code: 7204
- PSGC: 1004207000
- IDD : area code: +63 (0)88
- Native languages: Subanon; Cebuano; Tagalog

Jimenez, officially the Municipality of Jimenez (Cebuano: Lungsod sa Jimenez; Tagalog: Bayan ng Jimenez), is a municipality in the province of Misamis Occidental, Philippines. According to the 2024 census, it has a population of 29,265 people.

Within the predominantly Catholic town lies the Church of Saint John the Baptist which is one of the oldest monuments in the Philippines. Many Jimeneznons live outside the country but have retained close ties to the town, with "balikbayans" offering community service and philanthropy, and others taking up residence upon retirement abroad.

The heritage town is one of the best preserved colonial towns in the entire Philippines. The conservation, preservation, and restoration of the town's heritage structures such as the church and ancestral houses are the main focus of the local government. The town is being pushed to be included in the UNESCO World Heritage List.

== History ==
Jimenez retained its territory by 1903 when the number of municipalities in the then-undivided Misamis decreased through Act No. 951, issued on October 21.

The town was originally called (San Juan de) Palilán but was renamed Jiménez after Fray Francisco Jiménez de San Fermín, a Recollect.

== Geography ==
=== Barangays ===
Jimenez is politically subdivided into 24 barangays. Each barangay consists of puroks while some have sitios.

- Adorable
- Butuay
- Carmen
- Corrales
- Dicoloc
- Gata
- Guintomoyan
- Malibacsan
- Macabayao
- Matugas Alto
- Matugas Bajo
- Mialem
- Naga (Poblacion)
- Palilan
- Nacional (Poblacion)
- Rizal (Poblacion)
- San Isidro
- Santa Cruz (Poblacion)
- Sibaroc
- Sinara Alto
- Sinara Bajo
- Seti
- Tabo-o
- Taraka (Poblacion)

=== Climate ===
Climate data for Jimenez, Misamis Occidental
Month	Jan	Feb	Mar	Apr	May	Jun	Jul	Aug	Sep	Oct	Nov	Dec	Year
Mean daily maximum °C (°F)	27 (81)	28 (82)	29 (84)	31 (88)	31 (88)	30 (86)	30 (86)	30 (86)	30 (86)	30 (86)	29 (84)	28 (82)	29 (85)
Mean daily minimum °C (°F)	23 (73)	23 (73)	23 (73)	23 (73)	24 (75)	24 (75)	23 (73)	23 (73)	24 (75)	24 (75)	23 (73)	23 (73)	23 (74)
Average precipitation mm (inches)	69 (2.7)	44 (1.7)	37 (1.5)	29 (1.1)	87 (3.4)	137 (5.4)	131 (5.2)	141 (5.6)	143 (5.6)	134 (5.3)	68 (2.7)	53 (2.1)	1,073 (42.3)
Average rainy days	9.9	7.6	7.4	8.1	21.6	26.5	26.4	26.6	25.8	24.3	15.1	10.4	209.7
Source: Meteoblue

== Demographics ==
Population census of Jimenez

Year	Pop.	±% p.a.
1903	7,187	—
1918	13,212	+4.14%
1939	24,182	+2.92%
1948	25,352	+0.53%
1960	20,996	−1.56%
1970	18,551	−1.23%
1975	19,108	+0.60%
1980	21,037	+1.94%

Year	Pop.	±% p.a.
1990	20,589	−0.22%
1995	21,434	+0.76%
2000	23,212	+1.72%
2007	24,340	+0.66%
2010	25,234	+1.32%
2015	27,654	+1.76%
2020	28,909	+0.94%
2024	29,265	+0.29%

Source: Philippine Statistics Authority

In the 2024 census, the population of Jimenez was 29,265 people, with a density of 360 inhabitants per square kilometre or 930 inhabitants per square mile.

== Economy ==
Poverty incidence of Jimenez (%)

Source: Philippine Statistics Authority

== Education ==
Jimenez has three major high schools including School of Saint John the Baptist, Jimenez Bethel Institute, and Jimenez National Comprehensive High School, located in barangay Corrales.

== List of presumed Cultural Properties of the Philippines in Jimenez ==
The following table lists down built heritage structures as identified by the local government of Jimenez:

Cultural Property wmph identifier (Note: wmph is an internal identifier used by Wikimedia Philippines to identify the monument. This is not an official identifier, and only shown temporarily in the templates until the government creates an updated complete list.)	Site name	Description	Province	City or municipality	Address	Coordinates	Image
	Apolinar Jungao Razo House		Misamis Occidental	Jimenez		8°20′01″N 123°50′40″E	Upload file
	Bacarro Printing Press		Misamis Occidental	Jimenez		8°20′06″N 123°50′28″E	Upload file
	Balbino and Escobia Angus House		Misamis Occidental	Jimenez		8°20′02″N 123°50′29″E	Upload file
	Benito Lim and Marcelina Cabalog House		Misamis Occidental	Jimenez	Calderon cor. Sen. Ozamiz Sts.	8°20′08″N 123°50′23″E	Upload file
	Casa de Ozamiz		Misamis Occidental	Jimenez		8°20′03″N 123°50′35″E	Upload file
	Cayetano Yu and Usebia Larilin House		Misamis Occidental	Jimenez		8°20′03″N 123°50′30″E	Upload file
	Celso Velez Valmores, Sr. and Cesaria Docor Documento House		Misamis Occidental	Jimenez		8°19′58″N 123°50′22″E	Upload file
	Convent of the Maryknoll Sisters of Mercy		Misamis Occidental	Jimenez		8°20′08″N 123°50′20″E	Upload file
	Daniel Lee House		Misamis Occidental	Jimenez		8°20′02″N 123°50′34″E	Upload file
	Elang Azcuna House		Misamis Occidental	Jimenez		8°20′02″N 123°50′30″E	Upload file
	Francisco Azcuna House		Misamis Occidental	Jimenez		8°20′01″N 123°50′40″E	Upload file
	Fructuoso Malon Maulas and Nieves Parmisana House		Misamis Occidental	Jimenez	Burgos St.	8°20′01″N 123°50′26″E	Upload file
	Gabriel Haganus and Seferina Eroy House		Misamis Occidental	Jimenez	Burgos St., Barangay Nacional	8°20′02″N 123°50′18″E	Upload file
	Gregorio Tak-an and Teodora Olarte House		Misamis Occidental	Jimenez	Calderon cor. Sen. Ozamiz Sts., Barangay Nacional	8°20′09″N 123°50′23″E	Upload file
	Guillermo Te House		Misamis Occidental	Jimenez		8°20′01″N 123°50′39″E	Upload file
	Honorato Apao and Irene Paredes House		Misamis Occidental	Jimenez	J. Duenas cor Mabini Sts.	8°20′00″N 123°50′22″E	Upload file
	Inocencio and Adriana Madrangca House		Misamis Occidental	Jimenez	Burgos St.	8°20′02″N 123°50′21″E	Upload file
	Intsik Tia House		Misamis Occidental	Jimenez		8°20′03″N 123°50′29″E	Upload file
	Isaac and Severina Quilo		Misamis Occidental	Jimenez	Burgos St.	8°20′01″N 123°50′27″E	Upload file
	Isabelo and Teodora Gimeno House		Misamis Occidental	Jimenez	Spanish road cor. Burgos Sts.	8°19′54″N 123°50′24″E	Upload file
	Jose Luis Maulas and Felisa Parmisana House		Misamis Occidental	Jimenez	Burgos cor. Osmena Sts.	8°20′01″N 123°50′25″E	Upload file
	Leon Malinao and Narcisa Malon House		Misamis Occidental	Jimenez	Aguinaldo cor. Adorable Sts., Barangay Nacional	8°20′05″N 123°50′15″E	Upload file
	Lucio Tanguamos and Petrona Apao House		Misamis Occidental	Jimenez	Burgos St. cor. Spanish road	8°19′55″N 123°50′24″E	Upload file
			Misamis Occidental	Jimenez			Upload file
	Marcelo Harayo House		Misamis Occidental	Jimenez		8°20′01″N 123°50′40″E	Upload file
	Santiago Cajita House		Misamis Occidental	Jimenez		8°20′01″N 123°50′41″E	Upload file
	Sataru Oca and Beatriz Alforque House		Misamis Occidental	Jimenez	Burgos St.	8°20′02″N 123°50′20″E	Upload file
	Severino Vapor House		Misamis Occidental	Jimenez		8°20′03″N 123°50′32″E	Upload file
	Sofronio Galindo and Bonifacia Cahayag Balais House		Misamis Occidental	Jimenez		8°20′02″N 123°50′32″E	Upload file
	Spanish Road		Misamis Occidental	Jimenez		8°19′52″N 123°50′25″E	Upload file
	Tim Kian Tiu House		Misamis Occidental	Jimenez		8°20′02″N 123°50′19″E	Upload file

This table lists down built heritage structures not formally identified by the local government of Jimenez but are pursuant to the Republic Act No. 10066 or the National Heritage Law of 2009:

Cultural Property wmph identifier	Site name	Description	Province	City or municipality	Address	Coordinates	Image
	Abellana House		Misamis Occidental	Jimenez		8°19′55″N 123°50′34″E	Upload file
	Aglipayan Church		Misamis Occidental	Jimenez		8°20′02″N 123°50′27″E	Upload file
	Alfredo Galindo House		Misamis Occidental	Jimenez		8°19′53″N 123°50′22″E	Upload file
	Camilo Lagman House		Misamis Occidental	Jimenez		8°20′00″N 123°50′18″E	Upload file
	Catholic Cemetery		Misamis Occidental	Jimenez		8°20′28″N 123°50′13″E	Upload file
	Cloma House		Misamis Occidental	Jimenez		8°20′09″N 123°50′19″E	Upload file
	Eugenia Laguna House		Misamis Occidental	Jimenez		8°20′15″N 123°50′25″E	Upload file
	Eusebio Sagrado House		Misamis Occidental	Jimenez		8°20′00″N 123°50′18″E	Upload file
	Gamalinda House		Misamis Occidental	Jimenez		8°20′15″N 123°50′24″E	Upload file
	Henson Brigida House		Misamis Occidental	Jimenez		8°20′01″N 123°50′17″E	Upload file
	Heritage Baptist Church		Misamis Occidental	Jimenez		8°20′01″N 123°50′45″E	Upload file
	Honorato Gumuhit House		Misamis Occidental	Jimenez		8°19′53″N 123°50′21″E	Upload file
	Jimenez Bethel Institute		Misamis Occidental	Jimenez		8°20′00″N 123°50′32″E	Upload file
	Juan Balais House		Misamis Occidental	Jimenez		8°20′12″N 123°50′24″E	Upload file
	Juan Malos House		Misamis Occidental	Jimenez		8°20′04″N 123°50′11″E	Upload file
	Laguna House		Misamis Occidental	Jimenez		8°20′16″N 123°50′25″E	Upload file
	Leon Sagrado House		Misamis Occidental	Jimenez		8°20′01″N 123°50′18″E	Upload file
	Lingatong House		Misamis Occidental	Jimenez		8°20′00″N 123°50′30″E	Upload file
	Macaliong House		Misamis Occidental	Jimenez		8°20′05″N 123°50′17″E	Upload file
	Maghuyop House		Misamis Occidental	Jimenez		8°20′08″N 123°50′21″E	Upload file
	Manriquez House		Misamis Occidental	Jimenez		8°20′10″N 123°50′19″E	Upload file
	Paderanga House		Misamis Occidental	Jimenez		8°19′54″N 123°50′24″E	Upload file
	Palloto House		Misamis Occidental	Jimenez		8°20′01″N 123°50′44″E	Upload file
	Porferia Maulas House		Misamis Occidental	Jimenez		8°19′57″N 123°50′33″E	Upload file
	PURVIL High School		Misamis Occidental	Jimenez		8°20′02″N 123°50′26″E	Upload file
	Rafael Palangan House		Misamis Occidental	Jimenez		8°19′58″N 123°50′34″E	Upload file
	Rivera Gregorio House		Misamis Occidental	Jimenez		8°20′04″N 123°50′10″E	Upload file
	Seventh Day Adventist Church Ruins		Misamis Occidental	Jimenez		8°20′06″N 123°50′18″E	Upload file
	Simplicio Apao House		Misamis Occidental	Jimenez		8°20′01″N 123°50′31″E	Upload file
	Tiu Ching Huat Bakery		Misamis Occidental	Jimenez		8°20′02″N 123°50′36″E	Upload file
	Unnamed House 1		Misamis Occidental	Jimenez		8°20′07″N 123°50′18″E	Upload file
	Unnamed House 2		Misamis Occidental	Jimenez		8°20′00″N 123°50′20″E	Upload file
	Unnamed House 3		Misamis Occidental	Jimenez		8°20′01″N 123°50′15″E	Upload file
	Unnamed House 4		Misamis Occidental	Jimenez		8°19′59″N 123°50′22″E	Upload file
	Unnamed House 5		Misamis Occidental	Jimenez		8°19′59″N 123°50′25″E	Upload file
	Unnamed House 6		Misamis Occidental	Jimenez		8°20′04″N 123°50′33″E	Upload file
	Unnamed House 7		Misamis Occidental	Jimenez		8°19′59″N 123°50′25″E	Upload file
	Unnamed House 8		Misamis Occidental	Jimenez		8°20′05″N 123°50′27″E	Upload file
	Unnamed House 9		Misamis Occidental	Jimenez		8°20′02″N 123°50′10″E	Upload file
	Unnamed House 10		Misamis Occidental	Jimenez		8°20′11″N 123°50′33″E	Upload file
	Valeriano Castano-Guillermo House		Misamis Occidental	Jimenez		8°20′00″N 123°50′29″E	Upload file
