= Don Victoriano =

Municipality in Misamis Occidental, Philippines

Don Victoriano Don Victoriano Chiongbian
- Municipality
- Municipality of Don Victoriano
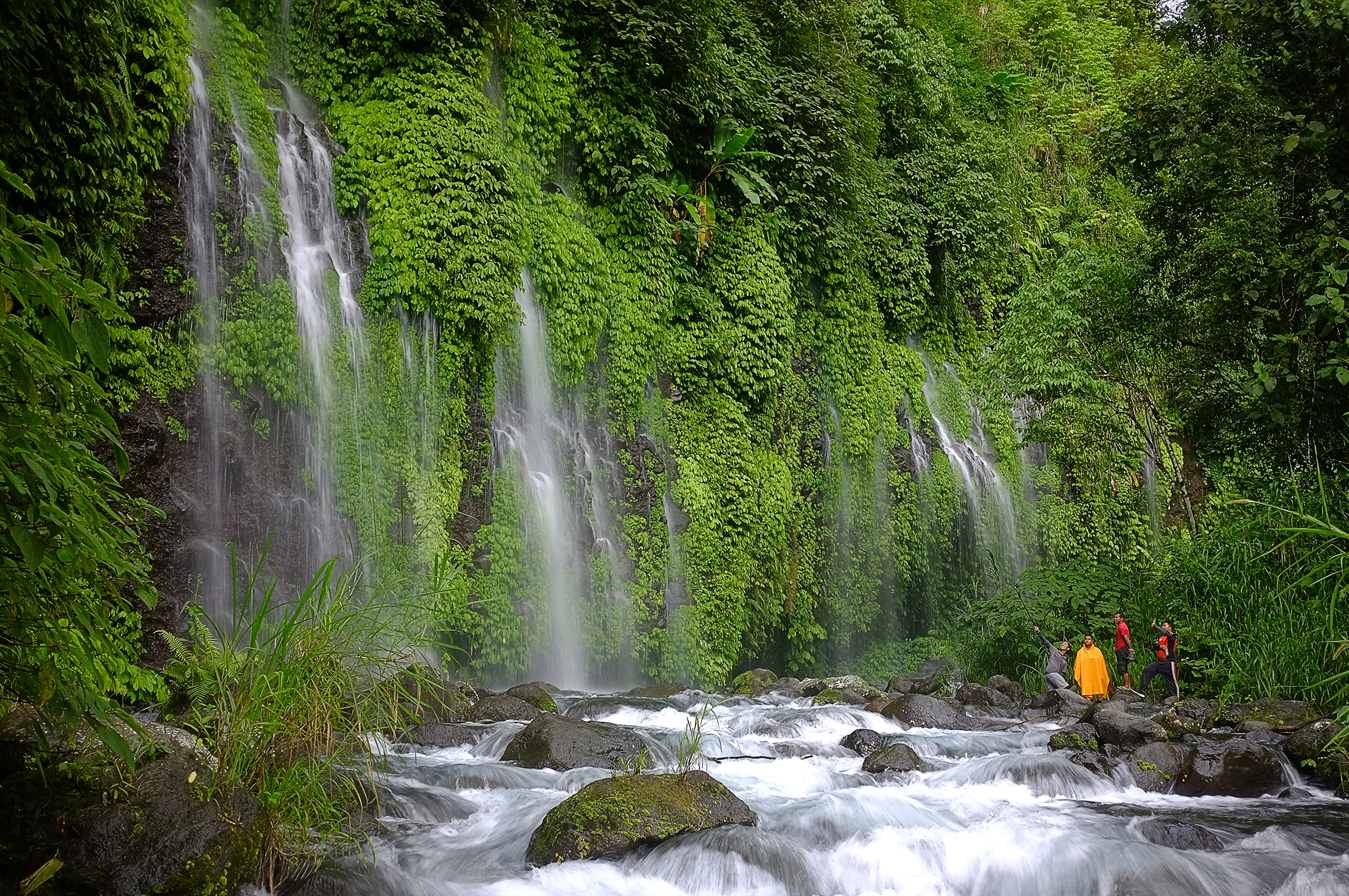
- Piduan Falls

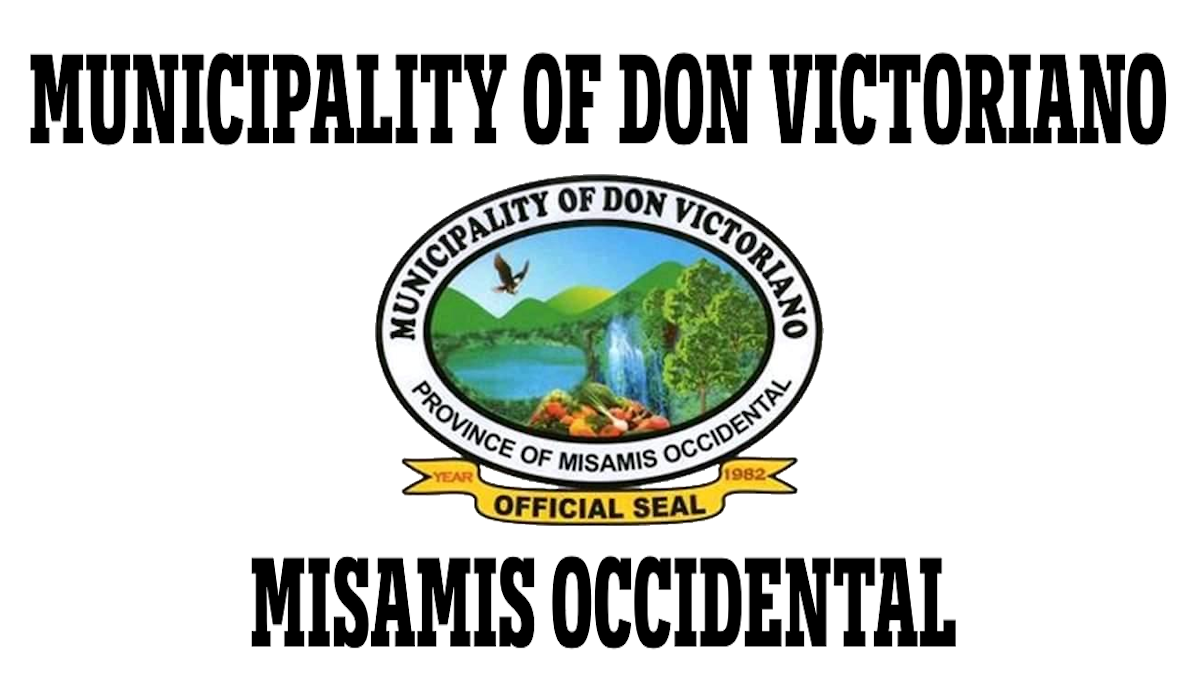
- Flag Seal
- Nickname: The Crossroads of MisOcc
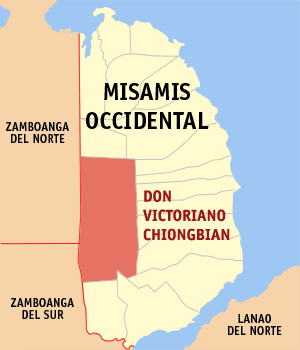
- Map of Misamis Occidental with Don Victoriano highlighted
- Interactive map of Don Victoriano
- Location within the Philippines
- Coordinates: 8°14′58″N 123°33′59″E
- Country: Philippines
- Region: Northern Mindanao
- Province: Misamis Occidental
- District: 2nd district
- Founded: February 8, 1982
- Named for: Mariano Marcos (1982-1990); Victoriano Chiongbian (since 1990)
- Barangays: 11 (see Barangays)

Government
  - Type: Sangguniang Bayan
  - Mayor: Bertoldo J. Murallon Jr. (ASPIN)
  - Vice Mayor: Elmer M. Pondara (ASPIN)
  - Representative: Sancho Fernando F. Oaminal (Lakas)
  - Municipal Council: Members: Junnifer A. Caday; Nacario B. Ansao; Roger D. Acaac; Gerry B. Pondara; Romel G. Suminguid; Albert T. Mag-usara; Charlie T. Serohijos; Victor C. Labastin
  - Electorate: 7,129 voters (2025)

Area
  - Total: 284.60 km^{2} (109.88 sq mi)
- Elevation: 990 m (3,250 ft)
- Highest elevation: 1,932 m (6,339 ft)
- Lowest elevation: 469 m (1,539 ft)

Population (2024 census)
  - Total: 10,214
  - Density: 35.889/km^{2} (92.952/sq mi)
  - Households: 2,385

Economy
  - Income class: 3rd municipal income class
  - Poverty incidence: 45.17% (2023)
  - Revenue: ₱ 147.6 million (2024)
  - Assets: ₱ 565.5 million (2024)
  - Expenditure: ₱ 128.1 million (2024)
  - Liabilities: ₱ 107.3 million (2024)

Service provider
  - Electricity: Zamboanga del Sur 1 Electric Cooperative (ZAMSURECO 1)
- Time zone: UTC+8 (PST)
- ZIP code: 7200
- PSGC: 1004217000
- IDD : area code: +63 (0)88
- Native languages: Subanon; Cebuano; Tagalog
- Website: www.donvicmisocc.gov.ph

Don Victoriano, officially the Municipality of Don Victoriano, unofficially as Don Victoriano Chiongbian (Cebuano: Lungsod sa Don Victoriano; Tagalog: Bayan ng Don Victoriano), is a municipality in the province of Misamis Occidental, Philippines. According to the 2024 census, it has a population of 10,214 people.

The municipality is home to the Mount Malindang National Park.

== History ==
The municipality was originally created as Don Mariano Marcos by virtue of Batas Pambansa Blg. 171 which was approved on February 8, 1982. Parts of seven municipalities in the province had been detached to be constituted into a new, distinct municipality. Those separated were barangays in Tudela (3) including Tuno which was designated the seat of government, Jimenez (also 3), Bonifacio (2), Clarin and Sinacaban (one in each); as well as sitios in a barangay each in Panaon and Aloran, situated on the side of the Mount Malindang Range. A plebiscite for ratification, along with 10 more newly created local entities, was held on May 17, coinciding with the barangay elections.

It was later renamed to its present-day one, as Don Victoriano, through Republic Act No. 6845 on January 20, 1990. It was named in honor of a native of Jimenez who served as councilor of Plaridel and eventually, the first mayor of this municipality. Recent documents such as on Commission on Elections and the Philippine Statistics Authority use Don Victoriano Chiongbian while Commission on Audit, the local government and subsequent laws such as Republic Act No. 7329, 9692, 10017 use Don Victoriano. On July 13, 2026, the Philippine Statistics Authority corrected the standardized official name of the municipality to Don Victoriano in the Philippine Standard Geographic Code.

== Geography ==
=== Barangays ===
Don Victoriano is politically subdivided into 11 barangays. Each barangay consists of puroks while some have sitios.

- Bagong Clarin
- Gandawan
- Lake Duminagat
- Lalud
- Lampasan
- Liboron
- Maramara
- Napangan
- Nueva Vista (Mansawan)
- Petianan
- Tuno

=== Climate ===
Climate data for Don Victoriano, Misamis Occidental
Month	Jan	Feb	Mar	Apr	May	Jun	Jul	Aug	Sep	Oct	Nov	Dec	Year
Mean daily maximum °C (°F)	20 (68)	20 (68)	22 (72)	23 (73)	23 (73)	22 (72)	22 (72)	23 (73)	23 (73)	22 (72)	22 (72)	21 (70)	22 (72)
Mean daily minimum °C (°F)	15 (59)	15 (59)	15 (59)	16 (61)	17 (63)	17 (63)	16 (61)	16 (61)	16 (61)	16 (61)	16 (61)	16 (61)	16 (61)
Average precipitation mm (inches)	69 (2.7)	44 (1.7)	37 (1.5)	29 (1.1)	87 (3.4)	137 (5.4)	131 (5.2)	141 (5.6)	143 (5.6)	134 (5.3)	68 (2.7)	53 (2.1)	1,073 (42.3)
Average rainy days	9.9	7.6	7.4	8.1	21.6	26.5	26.4	26.6	25.8	24.3	15.1	10.4	209.7
Source: Meteoblue

== Demographics ==
Population census of Don Victoriano
Year	Pop.	±% p.a.
1990	5,803	—
1995	6,878	+3.24%
2000	9,319	+6.73%
2007	10,157	+1.19%
2010	9,774	−1.39%
2015	10,183	+0.78%
2020	9,664	−1.10%
2024	10,214	+1.34%
Source: Philippine Statistics Authority

In the 2024 census, the population of Don Victoriano was 10,214 people, with a density of 36 inhabitants per square kilometre or 93 inhabitants per square mile.

== Economy ==
Poverty incidence of Don Victoriano (%)

Source: Philippine Statistics Authority
