= Misamis Occidental Aquamarine Park =

Misamis Occidental Aquamarine Park.
- Interactive map of Misamis Occidental Aquamarine Park.
- 8°16′06″N 123°50′58″E
- Date opened: February 2003
- Location: National Highway Ozamiz-Oroquieta, Tudela, 7202 Misamis Occidental, Philippines
- Annual visitors: 20,000 (2016)
- Website: www.misocc.gov.ph/tourism/

Misamis Occidental Aquamarine Park is a tropical resort and habitat for various marine mammals in Misamis Occidental, Philippines. It is located within the boundaries of the Tudela and Sinacaban municipalities. It houses a wildlife park with a variety of animals, most of whom are native to the Philippines. The park also contains hotel accommodations and a restaurant.

Currently, Dolphin Island is undergoing rehabilitation and is temporarily closed to visitors until further notice.

== History and development ==
The coastal region of Misamis Occidental extends over 162 kilometers and features an ecosystem rich with shoals and reefs, essential for the local population's livelihood. This area not only offers scenic beauty but also plays a crucial role in the sustenance of many local communities through its abundant marine resources.

In response to economic challenges, the Misamis Occidental provincial government launched the Misamis Occidental Aquamarine Development and Protection Program (MOADPP) in 2002. The initiative aimed to convert Misamis Occidental Aquamarine Park into an ecotourism site, enhancing revenue generation while prioritizing environmental preservation. The program allocated approximately 200 hectares for the development of facilities such as hotels, cottages, a mini zoo, function halls, restaurants, incubators, and a mangrove reforestation area. MOAPY Island was established as a haven for rescued dolphins and fish, while also serving as an area for aquaculture production.

The Australian Agency for International Development (AUSAID) significantly contributed by supporting livelihood projects aimed at providing alternative sources of income for local families, thus aiding in the mitigation of unemployment rates. The tourism boom linked to the Aquamarine Park further augmented job opportunities for the community.
