= Tudela National Comprehensive High School =

Public high school in Misamis Occidental, Philippines

- Mataas na Paaralang Pambansang Komprehensibo ng Tudela (Filipino)

Location
- Ozamiz - Oroquieta National Highway; Region 10; Tudela, Misamis Occidental, 7202; Philippines
- 8°14′49″N 123°50′42″E

Information
- School type: Public high school Basirang (main/junior high campus); Centro Napu (senior high campus)
- Established: 1993
- School number: 304058
- Principal: Mirites Rodriguez
- Grades: 7-12
- Campus: Rural
- Colors: Blue and white
- Nickname: TUDNACOHS
- Website: tudnacohs.webs.com

Tudela National Comprehensive High School (TUDNACOHS) (Filipino: Mataas na Paaralang Pambansang Komprehensibo ng Tudela or Pambansang Komprehensibo ng Mataas na Paaralan ng Tudela), Philippines, is a public secondary high school, created by the Republic Act no. 8013.

== School history ==
In January 1993, Mayor Felix L. Sarigumba disclosed his planned to open a public secondary school in the municipality of Tudela after noticing the plight of many parents who could hardly send their children to private high schools considering the high tuition fees. The late Congressman Hilarion Nonoy Ramiro, Jr., supported his plan by passing House Bill No. 14368 with the assurance to give financial assistance from his Community Development Fund (CDF) for the honoraria of the pioneer teachers in the amount of 25,000 pesos per month.

The first enrolment of students started on May 27, 1993, under the supervision of Necita R. Bunao, the district supervisor of Tudela public elementary schools with the agreement of the mayor. It was initiated by Asuncion D. Sarabia, an elementary school teacher designated by Bunao to accept enrollees in response to the request of the interested parents whose children were willing to enroll in spite of the insufficient number of classrooms and chairs. To address such insufficiency, volunteer parents joined hands in constructing two temporary classrooms out of indigenous materials such as coco lumber, bamboo, amacan and nipa for roofing. Students were also required to bring homemade armchairs of different sizes. In the first year of operation, only first and second year students were accepted to enroll, who totaled 312, composing four sections in the first year level and two sections in the second year level with 14 teachers. They temporarily occupied four of the vacant classrooms of Tudela Central School and two temporary classrooms that were built by the parents at the back of the same school in Barangay Centro Napu through the assistance of funds taken from the local government unit. The school title was Tudela National High School.

The next school year provoked the complaints of the private sectarian high schools in the municipality, San Isidro Academy and Northwestern Mindanao Christian Colleges. There was an obvious decline in the number of their students of the said school because some students transferred to the newly established public high school. The student population of Tudela National Comprehensive High School reached 422 in the first to third year levels during that school year. In school year 1995–1996, a surprising enrolment of 471 was reached with the complete secondary year levels, which greatly paved the way to the considerable decrease of student population of the neighboring private high schools, not only in the Municipality of Tudela but also in the neighboring municipalities as well. Apparently, the erection of four classrooms at the new proposed school site at Barangay Basirang, one was made of concrete and two were made of amacan, funded by Senator Gloria Macapagal Arroyo and the Local Government Unit, had beckoned more new students and transferees from other schools to enroll. The classrooms in the first location were occupied by the second, third and fourth year students while the classrooms in the new school site were occupied by the first year students. The two locations were approximately one and a half kilometers apart from each other. As a result, different forms of protest were amplified and aired by private high schools about the legality of the establishment of Tudela National High School.

In February 1996, Republic Act No. 8013 was received stating therein the approval of House Bill No. 14368 in May 1995. The act further stated to convert the name Tudela National High School to Tudela National Comprehensive High School, which was an independent school from Kolambutan Bajo National High School, an older existing public high school situated in the hinterland of Tudela, twelve kilometers away from the National Highway. This paved the way to the subsequent inflow of teacher items. Fourteen nearly created teacher items were given. The nine pioneer teachers were absorbed first into permanent status. Later, three additional teacher items were added and another two items followed and were occupied in the next school year. The first fourteen teacher items were then completely occupied.

In school year 1996–1997, the secretary of the Department of Education, Culture and Sports, Honorable Ricardo T. Gloria, visited the school to inspect its new location at Basirang, Tudela, Misamis Occidental. He gave a one million peso fund to fill the marshland along the mangroves with soil and bouldersto prepare it for the construction of a school building. Hence, the new 16-classroom building was erected and completed on January 11, 1999, and all the students and teachers moved to the new school site in school year 1999–2000. In school year 2002–2003, two additional teacher items were given; one was occupied and the other was borrowed by Diwat National High School.

TUDNACOHS became one of the recipient schools of Personal Computers for Public Schools (PCPS), a computer laboratory package from Japan through the supervision of the Department of Trade and Industry, headed by its secretary, Honorable Mar Roxas. Twenty brand new personal computers and two printers were delivered to the school in August 2002, which motivated the influx of more students in the next school year.

In its first two school years, the school was managed by a teacher-in-charge named Eleuteira D. Elmedulan and monitored by Necita R. Bunao, the district supervisor of public elementary schools in Tudela. In school year 1995–1996, officer-in-charge Gaudioso M. Manera took over the school. In school year 1996–1997, Dr. Rebecca M. Diango, ES-1, became the officer-in-charge. She coined the acronym TUDNACOHS for Tudela National Comprehensive High School. From then on, the school was fondly called TUDNACOHS in the locality and in the whole division. In 1997, a principal item was given to the school and Nicolas M. Martinez was installed into the position. He was a former head teacher from Aloran Trade High School. He made a lot of difference in the administration and image of the school throughout the DepEd-Division of Misamis Occidental. During his administration Glenn D. Cabatuan, an English and Araling Panlipunan teacher, composed the school song, "TUDNACOHS March". Since then, the singing of the school song has been included in the morning rituals of the students before the first period of classes in the morning. The same teacher created the school logo, which is still currently used, with the alliance of Carmelito S. Simbajon, another teacher in Araling Panlipunan. This period saw a considerable increase of the student population, which reached 883 in school year 2002–2003. Effective June 2003, Martinez was reassigned to Aloran Trade High School and the school was left under the care of Eleuteria D. Elmedulan for some time. Ione G. Xenos-Canonigo became principal in 2015. In July 2019, Romeo S. Arenaza was appointed as principal, followed by Juliet Lapiz on May 23, 2020.

== Campus site ==
TUDNACOHS has separate campuses for junior high school and senior high school, and a satellite campus in Maikay.

=== Main/junior high campus ===
The main campus is located in the coastal barangay of Basirang of the agricultural municipality of Tudela, Misamis Occidental. It occupies a former mangrove site, a few meters west of Iligan Bay and along the national highway. It is about a kilometer north of the town's commercial center and about 1.5 kilometer south of the popular eco-tourism destination in the region, the Misamis Occidental Aquamarine Park.
