= Clarin, Misamis Occidental =

Municipality in Misamis Occidental, Philippines

Clarin
- Municipality
- Municipality of Clarin
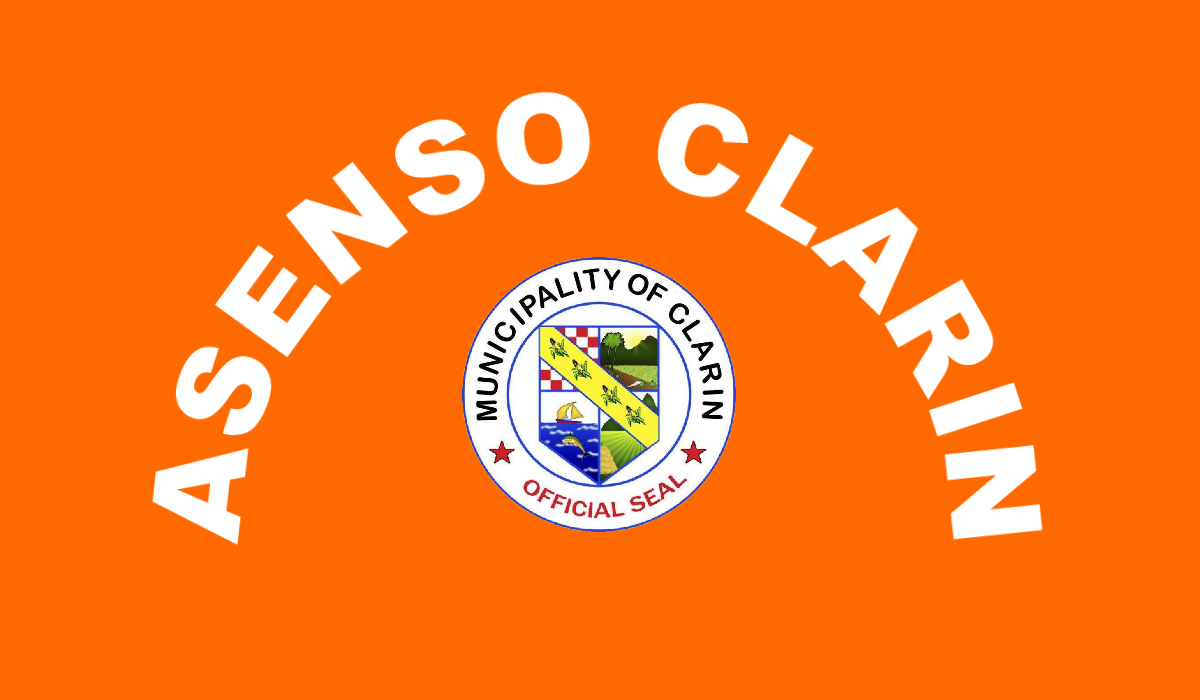
- Flag

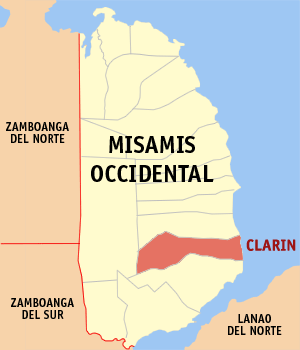
- Map of Misamis Occidental with Clarin highlighted
- Interactive map of Clarin
- Location within the Philippines
- Coordinates: 8°12′N 123°51′E
- Country: Philippines
- Region: Northern Mindanao
- Province: Misamis Occidental
- District: 2nd district
- Founded: February 21, 1921
- Named for: José Clarín
- Barangays: 29 (see Barangays)

Government
  - Type: Sangguniang Bayan
  - Mayor: Ging Oaminal-Delos Santos
  - Vice Mayor: Jojo Roa
  - Representative: Sancho Fernando F. Oaminal (Lakas)
  - Municipal Council: Members: Regino L. Barrientos; Gene A. Saquin; Michael F. Saquin; Kenneth L. Geralde; Ryan M. Bodiongan; Vencito T. Go; Mila E. Manreal; Freddie B. Malicse
  - Electorate: 26,372 voters (2025)

Area
  - Total: 84.50 km^{2} (32.63 sq mi)
- Elevation: 15 m (49 ft)
- Highest elevation: 134 m (440 ft)
- Lowest elevation: 0 m (0 ft)

Population (2024 census)
  - Total: 39,867
  - Density: 471.8/km^{2} (1,222/sq mi)
  - Households: 9,413

Economy
  - Income class: 2nd municipal income class
  - Poverty incidence: 28.96% (2023)
  - Revenue: ₱ 306.2 million (2024)
  - Assets: ₱ 582.9 million (2024)
  - Expenditure: ₱ 182 million (2024)
  - Liabilities: ₱ 90.15 million (2024)

Service provider
  - Electricity: Misamis Occidental 2 Electric Cooperative (MOELCI 2)
- Time zone: UTC+8 (PST)
- ZIP code: 7201
- PSGC: 1004205000
- IDD : area code: +63 (0)88
- Native languages: Subanon; Cebuano; Tagalog

Clarin, officially the Municipality of Clarin (Cebuano: Lungsod sa Clarin; Tagalog: Bayan ng Clarin), is a municipality in the province of Misamis Occidental, Philippines. According to the 2024 census, it has a population of 39,867 people.

== History ==
The present territory of Clarin was once part of the former municipality of Loculan. Through Act No. 951, issued by the Philippine Commission on October 21, 1903, which reduced the number of municipalities in the then-undivided Misamis province from 24 to 10, Loculan was effectively abolished after being joined with the municipality of Misamis.

During the American occupation, the inhabitants in Loculan petitioned to be separated from Misamis and organized into two independent municipalities. Thus, Governor-General Francis Burton Harrison (through the efforts of Senator Jose A. Clarin) issued Executive Order (EO) No. 61 on December 28, 1920, creating the municipality of Clarin, along with Tudela; Barrio Loculan became the seat of government. The organization became effective on the first day of 1921.

In April 1924, by virtue of EO No. 20, Barrio Balicaocao in Tudela was transferred to Clarin.

In 1982, through Batas Pambansa Blg. 171, Barangay Bagong Clarin was separated, becoming part of the newly created Don Mariano Marcos.

== Geography ==
=== Climate ===
Climate data for Clarin, Misamis Occidental
Month	Jan	Feb	Mar	Apr	May	Jun	Jul	Aug	Sep	Oct	Nov	Dec	Year
Mean daily maximum °C (°F)	28 (82)	28 (82)	29 (84)	31 (88)	31 (88)	30 (86)	30 (86)	30 (86)	30 (86)	30 (86)	29 (84)	28 (82)	30 (85)
Mean daily minimum °C (°F)	23 (73)	23 (73)	23 (73)	23 (73)	24 (75)	24 (75)	24 (75)	24 (75)	24 (75)	24 (75)	24 (75)	23 (73)	24 (74)
Average precipitation mm (inches)	69 (2.7)	44 (1.7)	37 (1.5)	29 (1.1)	87 (3.4)	137 (5.4)	131 (5.2)	141 (5.6)	143 (5.6)	134 (5.3)	68 (2.7)	53 (2.1)	1,073 (42.3)
Average rainy days	9.9	7.6	7.4	8.1	21.6	26.5	26.4	26.6	25.8	24.3	15.1	10.4	209.7
Source: Meteoblue (modeled/calculated data, not measured locally)

=== Barangays ===
Clarin is politically subdivided into 29 barangays. Each barangay consists of puroks while some have sitios.

- Bernad
- Bito-on
- Cabunga-an
- Canibungan Daku
- Canibungan Putol
- Canipacan
- Dalingap
- Dela Paz
- Dolores
- Gata Daku
- Gata Diot
- Guba
- Kinangay Norte
- Kinangay Sur
- Lapasan
- Lupagan
- Malibangcao
- Masabud
- Mialen
- Pan-ay
- Penacio
- Poblacion I
- Poblacion II
- Poblacion III
- Poblacion IV
- Sebasi
- Segatic Daku
- Segatic Diot
- Tinacla-an

== Demographics ==
Population census of Clarin

Year	Pop.	±% p.a.
1939	13,581	—
1948	13,179	−0.33%
1960	14,011	+0.51%
1970	17,806	+2.42%
1975	19,511	+1.85%
1980	21,521	+1.98%
1990	23,802	+1.01%

Year	Pop.	±% p.a.
1995	26,202	+1.82%
2000	29,712	+2.73%
2007	33,299	+1.58%
2010	35,573	+2.43%
2015	37,548	+1.03%
2020	39,356	+0.99%
2024	39,867	+0.31%

Source: Philippine Statistics Authority

In the 2024 census, the population of Clarin was 39,867 people, with a density of 470 inhabitants per square kilometre or 1,200 inhabitants per square mile.

== Economy ==
Poverty incidence of Clarin (%)

Source: Philippine Statistics Authority

Most of the town's residents earned their living through farming and fishing. Farming involves many rice fields that have been cultivated for the past years. Fishing provides both a lot of fishes and sea shells that are abundant in the deep areas of Panguil Bay. Several beach resorts line the coast in Barangay Lupagan, and are popular destinations for locals and guests and serve the area as venues for all kinds of private and corporate events.
