= Binalbal Festival =

Annual festival in Misamis Occidental, Philippines

- Genre: carnival, parade, street dancing
- Dates: January 1
- Location(s): Tudela, Misamis Occidental
- Years active: 1920's - present

The Binalbal Festival is an annual festival held on the first of January in Tudela, Misamis Occidental, Philippines. It is a unique celebration of welcoming the new year for the townsfolk of Tudela.

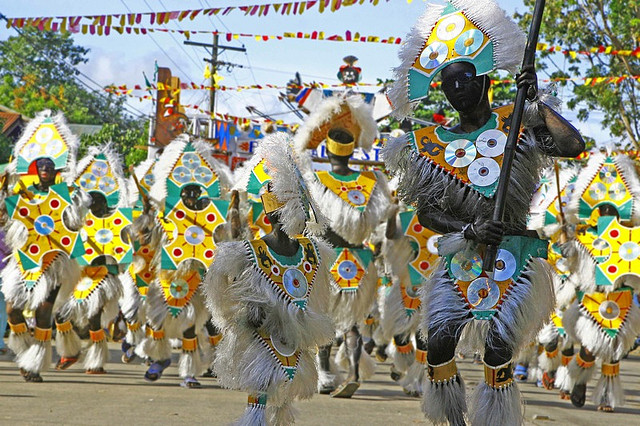
An entry of Tudela Binalbal Festival called the "Black Knights" (Photo: Mamre Lim)

Participants are disguised through the use of masks which allow them full freedom of inhibition during the new year celebration. In the celebration, people or spectators wear masks and outfits that would represent their own definition of "Binalbal".

Binalbal is derived from the local dialect "Balbal" which is Cebuano; it refers to a supernatural genus of strange-looking lifeforms: imps, witches, ogres, and the likes of them. Very much like a giant Halloween costume party, the Binalbal Festival is a very important cultural celebration where many revelers are clad in gory costumes.

== The Celebration ==
Since its early beginnings, the celebration traditionally starts on the evening until midnight of December 31 (known as the "Masquerade Ball") and continues on the noon time of January 1, which is the grand parade of Binalbal Festival.

== Origin ==
It all started as simply wearing masks on New Year's Day to disguise the identity of a person. In the early 1920s, prominent people of Tudela participated in this affair, including Gregorio Aborka, Sofronio Inting, Edmundo Ruiz Sr., Gregorio Nebre, Florentino N. Olarte, Jose Singson, Alberto Raagas and other unrecorded personalities in metro barangays of Tudela.

It is associated with the wearing of "Maskara" (mask) at the outset of New Year. With bizarre make-up, the "Binalbal" roamed the street, visiting friends and relatives and asking gifts "biko" or "suman", and other native delicacies.

This unique cultural tradition was handed down from the fathers of Tudelanians with its center theme focused on love, unity and prosperity with the hope of ultimately re-committing the individual to the spiritual and social codes of the past: a combination of merrymaking, thanksgiving, and prayers for a good harvest, good health and good luck. It is also an occasion of fun for everyone.

The word "Binalbal", according to its official history published by the Local Government of Tudela dated January 1, 2003, does not carry unsavory connotations. It did not originate from the word "Balbal" (witch), or denoting evil spirit, nor was it coined to mean the Municipality of Tudela is inhabited by "balbals" (witches). Cebu has "Sinulog", Aklan "Ati-Atihan", the Illongos in Iloilo "Dinagyang", all rolled into one "Binalbal" in Tudela.

Binalbal Festival has some semblance with Halloween practices in the British Isles. The ancient Celts then believed that in the evening of October 31, Samon, ‘Lord of the Dead’, called forth many evil spirits. To ward off these supernatural creatures of darkness, the “Druids” (ancient religious leaders among the Celtic peoples) made great bonfires.

Also, the similarity of Binalbal Festival with "Mardi Gras"—whose origins can be traced to medieval Europe, passing through Rome and Venice in the 17th and 18th centuries to the French House of the Bourbons—portrays merrymaking with parades, masked balls, street dancing and Halloween parties. These led to Binalbal's imitation of witches, ghosts, all kinds and shapes of animals, and the so-called fallen angels. Akin to its customs and beliefs, Tudelanhons sometimes offer "treats" or "gifts" to prevent evil spirit from doing harm.

In this part of Northwestern Mindanao only the municipality can claim originality on this festival. In the perpetuation of this tradition, the Municipality of Tudela, through Sanggunian Resolution, has created the Municipal Council for Local Culture and the Arts, for the purpose of ensuring the preservation, enrichment and promotion of Binalbal Festival as a distinct cultural heritage of the Tudelanians for the past 90 years.

Binalbal, as a cultural festival, has been supported by the provincial and local government units. In 1960, through the Municipal Council resolution by then Mayor Antero Singidas, the festival was recognized and given financial support.

During the time of Mayor Bernadette Paredes-Encinareal, the festival was given recognition by the Department of Tourism. The project proposals and request for funding support from the national government, through the Department of Tourism, were duly furnished but somehow it did not materialize. It was highly suggested by then Mayor Encinareal the creation of a special committee to specifically formulate plans, programs, sources of funds, and other innovative concerns to ensure the continuity of this yearly tradition.
