= Tangub =

Component city in Misamis Occidental, Philippines

- Component city
- City of Tangub
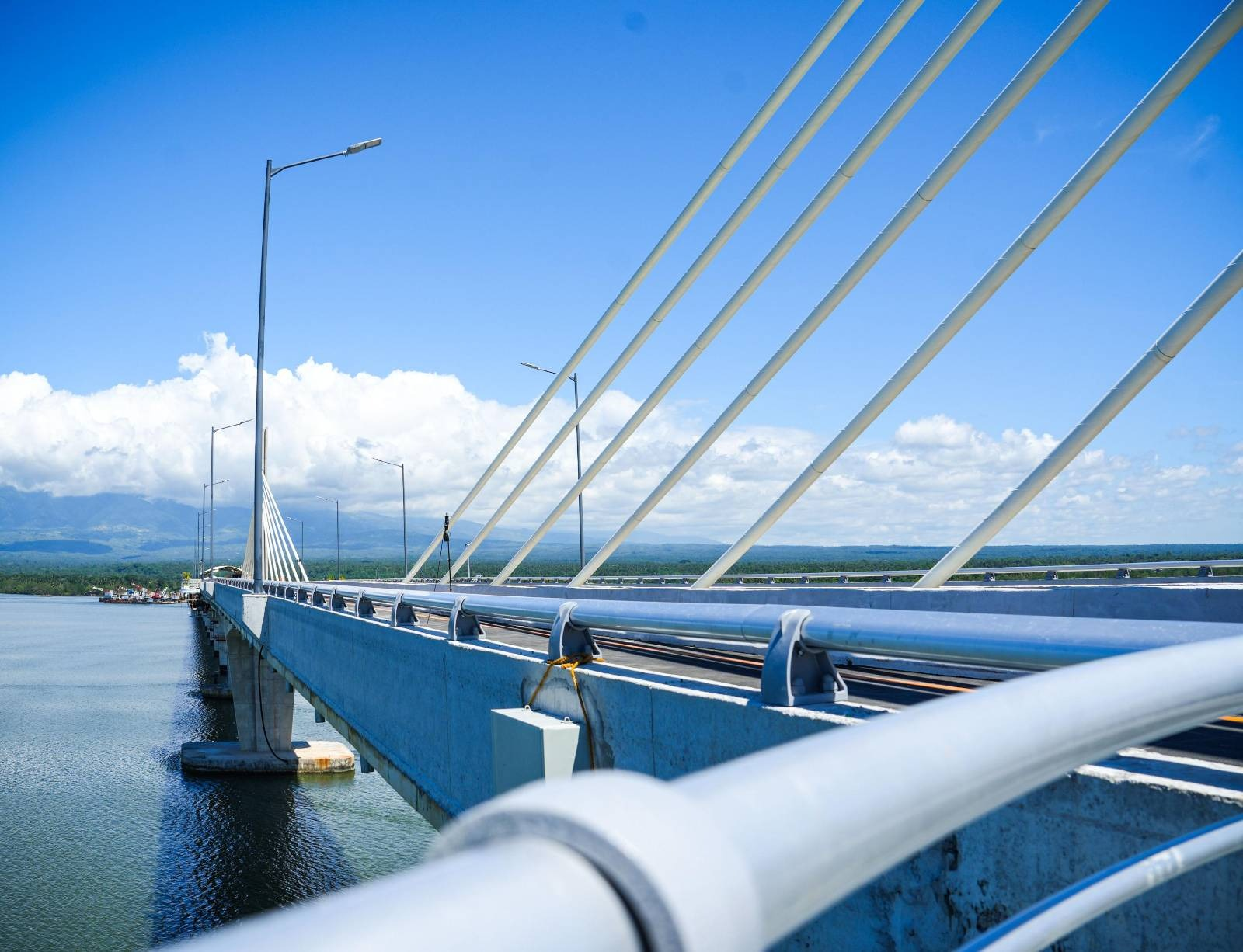
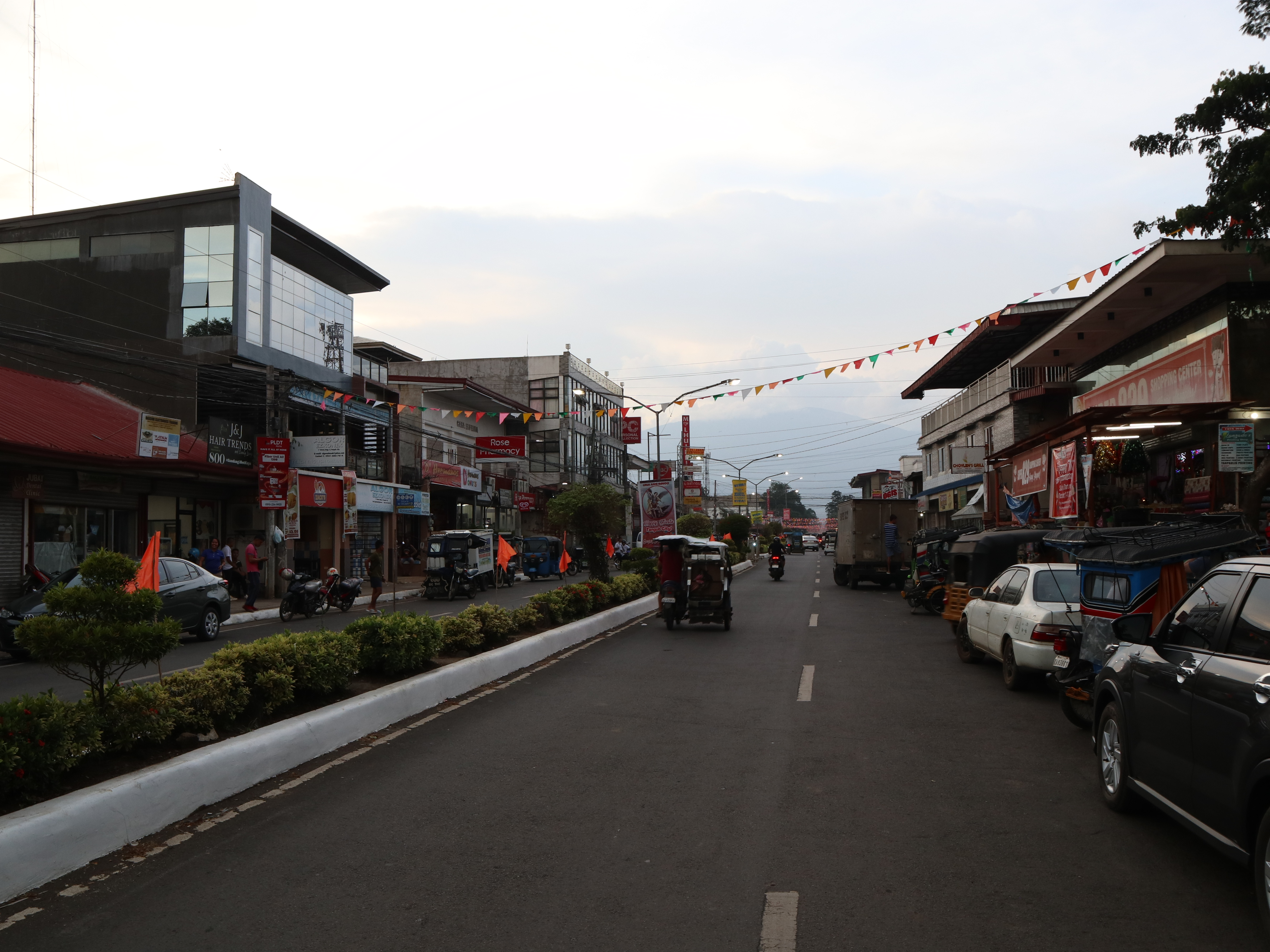
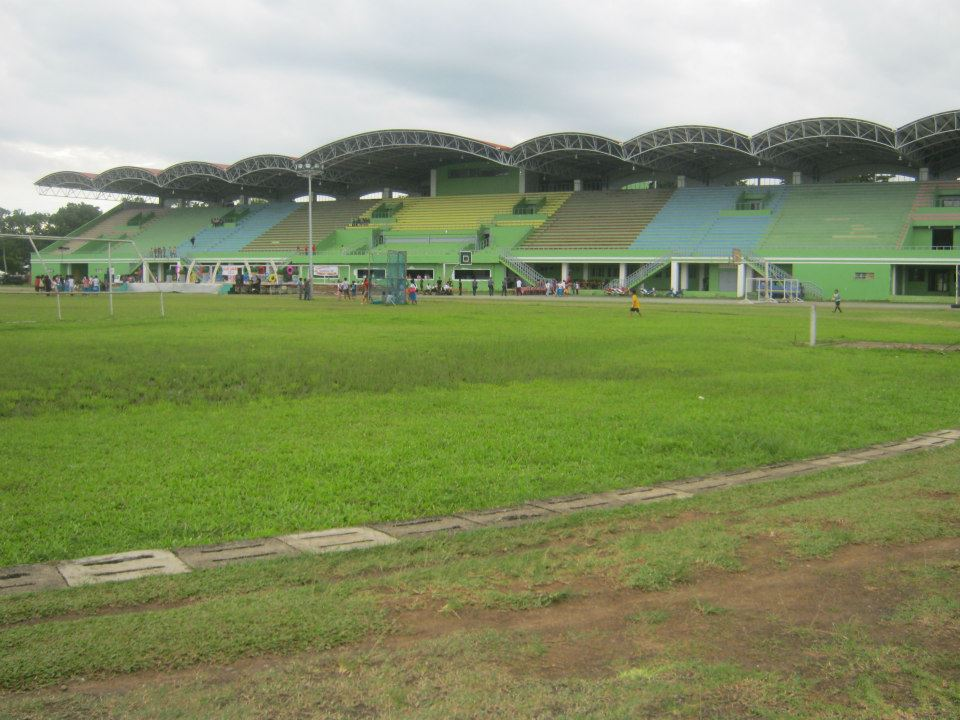
- Tangub City Hall People's Gymnasium Panguil Bay Bridge First Street Tangub City Sports Complex

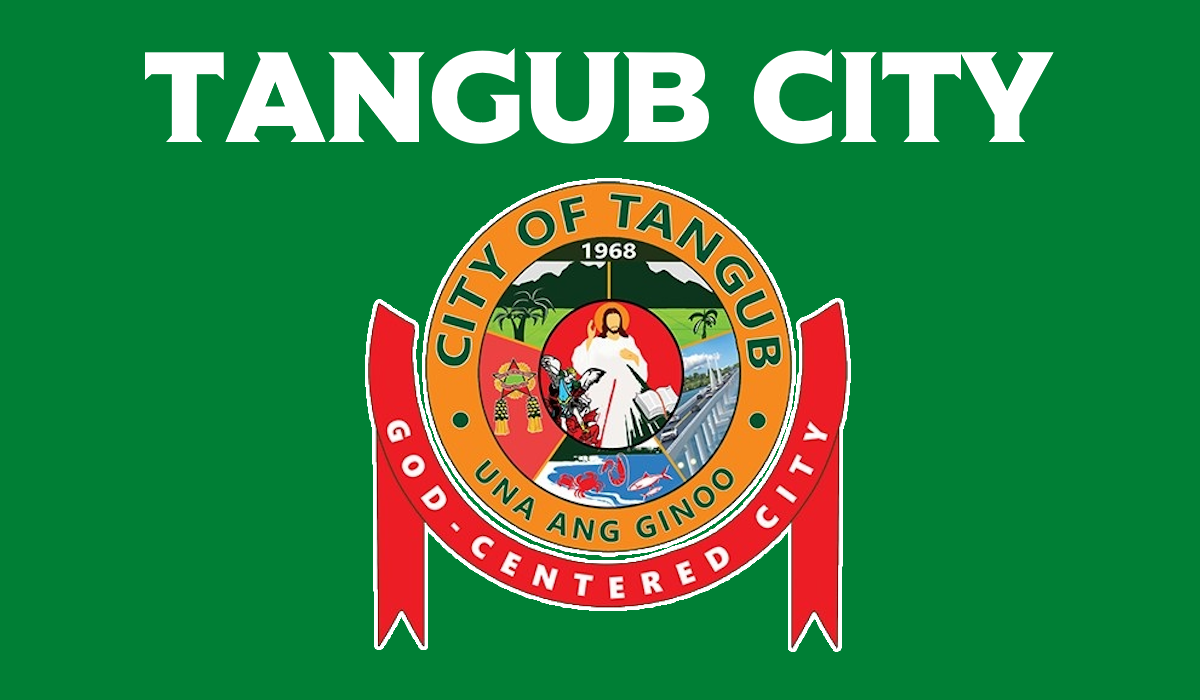
- Flag Seal
- Nicknames: Christmas Symbols Capital of the Philippines; God-Centered City
- Motto: Una ang Ginoo (Cebuano) 'God comes First'
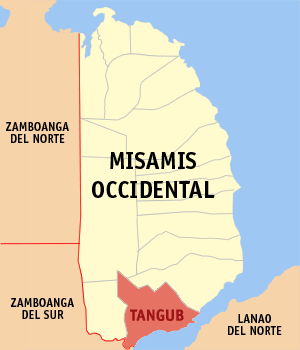
- Map of Misamis Occidental with Tangub highlighted
- Interactive map of Tangub
- Location within the Philippines
- Coordinates: 8°04′00″N 123°45′00″E
- Country: Philippines
- Region: Northern Mindanao
- Province: Misamis Occidental
- District: 2nd district
- Founded: December 4, 1929
- Renamed: November 30, 1930 (as Tangub)
- Cityhood: June 17, 1967
- Barangays: 55 (see Barangays)

Government
  - Type: Sangguniang Panlungsod
  - Mayor: Sabiniano S. Canama (ASPIN)
  - Vice Mayor: Tito B. Decina (ASPIN)
  - Representative: Sancho Fernando F. Oaminal (Lakas)
  - City Council: Members: Francisco I. Chiong Jr.; Antonio S. Caylan Jr.; Rubin R. Roma; Hipolito G. Roxas Jr.; Lowida L. Alcalde; Marissa V. Amamio; Romulo L. Del Socorro; Leonido C. Tala Sr.; Eddie S. Gomez; Alexander M. Returerto
  - Electorate: 46,336 voters (2025)

Area
  - Total: 162.78 km^{2} (62.85 sq mi)
- Elevation: 243 m (797 ft)
- Highest elevation: 2,421 m (7,943 ft)
- Lowest elevation: 0 m (0 ft)

Population (2024 census)
  - Total: 68,419
  - Density: 420.32/km^{2} (1,088.6/sq mi)
  - Households: 15,456
- Demonym: Tangubanon

Economy
  - Income class: 3rd city income class
  - Poverty incidence: 32.84% (2023)
  - Revenue: ₱ 945.6 million (2024)
  - Assets: ₱ 2,820 million (2024)
  - Expenditure: ₱ 752.1 million (2024)
  - Liabilities: ₱ 515.5 million (2024)

Service provider
  - Electricity: Misamis Occidental 2 Electric Cooperative (MOELCI 2)
- Time zone: UTC+8 (PST)
- ZIP code: 7214
- PSGC: 104215000
- IDD : area code: +63 (0)88
- Native languages: Subanon; Cebuano; Tagalog
- Feast date: September 29
- Catholic diocese: Archdiocese of Ozamis
- Patron saint: Michael the Archangel
- Website: tangubcity.gov.ph

Tangub, officially the City of Tangub (Cebuano: Dakbayan sa Tangub; Filipino: Lungsod ng Tangub), is a component city in the province of Misamis Occidental, Philippines. According to the 2024 census, it has a population of 68,419 people.

Tangub City is also where the Panguil Bay Bridge is situated. The 3.77 km (2.34 mi) bridge connects Tangub, Misamis Occidental to Tubod, Lanao del Norte.

== History ==
During the Spanish colonial period of the Philippines, Tangub was recorded in Spanish maps as the barrio of Tan͠go. In the early 1900s, the name Tango is also recorded in maps and publications during the Philippine-American War.

The book A Pronouncing Gazetteer and Geographical Dictionary of the Philippine Islands (1902) by the Bureau of Insular Affairs records Tan͠gó as a "hamlet on northwestern shore of Panguil Bay, 3 miles southwest of Misamis, Misamis, Mindanao." The book also records its pronunciation as having a final glottal stop (tahng-oh').

The 1918 Philippine census records it as "Tangob," a barrio in the municipality of Misamis in the former province of Misamis.

The etymology of the name Tangub is unknown. According to local folk etymology, it came from the Subanen word "Tangkub", a rice container made of tree bark woven together by rattan strips, but this has no academic evidence.

=== As a municipality ===
By the 1920s, there was increasing support for the independence of Tangob from Misamis as its own municipality, advocated in particular by a local group, the Aspiracion Committee.

The municipality of Regidor (with its seat of government in the barrio of Tangob) was created through Executive Order (EO) No. 220, issued by Governor General Dwight F. Davis on December 4, 1929, which organized 14 barrios—separated from Misamis—into the 21st municipality of the once undivided Misamis province. The municipality was named after Antonio Maria Regidor, a lawyer and reformist who supported the Secularization movement against the Spanish colonial regime. Similar new municipalities created during the same period were also named after prominent revolutionaries, including Lopez Jaena and General Luna.

However, its organization only took effect on January 1, 1930, the same day the province of Occidental Misamis was established following the split of Misamis. By Act No. 3701 dated November 20, the municipality was renamed "Tangub".

In 1940, six of its barrios were organized into the separate municipality of Bonifacio by the virtue of EO No. 242.

=== Cityhood ===
On June 17, 1967, under Republic Act No. 5131, Tangub became a chartered city, the second in Misamis Occidental.

== Geography ==
Tangub is close to the Zamboanga del Sur and Zamboanga del Norte provinces, while across the bay is Lanao del Norte. Tangub is 77.1 km (77,100 mi) from Maria Cristina Falls, the main source of hydroelectric power in Mindanao.

=== Barangays ===
Tangub is politically subdivided into 55 barangays. Each barangay consists of puroks, while some have sitios.

- Silanga
- Marcos (Aquino)
- Santa Maria (Baga)
- Balatacan
- Baluk
- Banglay
- Mantic
- Mingcanaway
- Bintana
- Bocator
- Bongabong
- Caniangan
- Capalaran
- Catagan
- Barangay I - City Hall (Poblacion)
- Barangay II - Marilou Annex (Poblacion)
- Barangay IV - St. Michael (Poblacion)
- Isidro D. Tan (Dimalooc)
- Garang
- Guinabot
- Guinalaban
- Hoyohoy
- Kauswagan
- Kimat
- Labuyo
- Lorenzo Tan
- Barangay VI - Lower Polao (Poblacion)
- Lumban
- Maloro
- Barangay V - Malubog (Poblacion)
- Manga
- Maquilao
- Barangay III- Market Kalubian (Poblacion)
- Matugnao
- Minsubong
- Owayan
- Paiton
- Panalsalan
- Pangabuan
- Prenza
- Salimpuno
- San Antonio
- San Apolinario
- San Vicente
- Santa Cruz
- Santo Niño
- Sicot
- Silanga
- Silangit
- Simasay
- Sumirap
- Taguite
- Tituron
- Tugas
- Barangay VII - Upper Polao (Poblacion)
- Villaba

=== Climate ===
Climate data for Tangub City, Misamis Occidental
| Month | Jan | Feb | Mar | Apr | May | Jun | Jul | Aug | Sep | Oct | Nov | Dec | Year |
|---|---|---|---|---|---|---|---|---|---|---|---|---|---|
| Mean daily maximum °C (°F) | 29 (84) | 30 (86) | 31 (88) | 31 (88) | 30 (86) | 30 (86) | 29 (84) | 30 (86) | 30 (86) | 30 (86) | 30 (86) | 30 (86) | 30 (86) |
| Mean daily minimum °C (°F) | 22 (72) | 22 (72) | 22 (72) | 23 (73) | 24 (75) | 24 (75) | 24 (75) | 24 (75) | 24 (75) | 24 (75) | 23 (73) | 23 (73) | 23 (74) |
| Average precipitation mm (inches) | 69 (2.7) | 58 (2.3) | 67 (2.6) | 60 (2.4) | 109 (4.3) | 114 (4.5) | 83 (3.3) | 78 (3.1) | 76 (3.0) | 92 (3.6) | 86 (3.4) | 63 (2.5) | 955 (37.7) |
| Average rainy days | 12.8 | 11.6 | 14.8 | 17.4 | 24.8 | 23.5 | 20.7 | 18.5 | 17.4 | 22.5 | 21.6 | 15.6 | 221.2 |
Source: Meteoblue

== Demographics ==
Population census of Tangub
| Year | Pop. | ±% p.a. |
|---|---|---|
| 1939 | 44,743 | — |
| 1948 | 20,353 | −8.38% |
| 1960 | 21,101 | +0.30% |
| 1970 | 30,918 | +3.89% |
| 1975 | 40,461 | +5.54% |
| 1980 | 40,401 | −0.03% |
| 1990 | 42,926 | +0.61% |
| 1995 | 46,004 | +1.31% |
| 2000 | 49,695 | +1.67% |
| 2007 | 56,644 | +1.82% |
| 2010 | 59,892 | +2.05% |
| 2015 | 63,011 | +0.97% |
| 2020 | 68,389 | +1.74% |
| 2024 | 68,419 | +0.01% |
Source: Philippine Statistics Authority

In the 2024 census, the population of Tangub was 68,419 people, with a density of 420 inhabitants per square kilometre or 1,100 inhabitants per square mile.

== Economy ==
Poverty incidence of Tangub (%)

Source: Philippine Statistics Authority

== Culture ==
=== Notable events and festivals ===
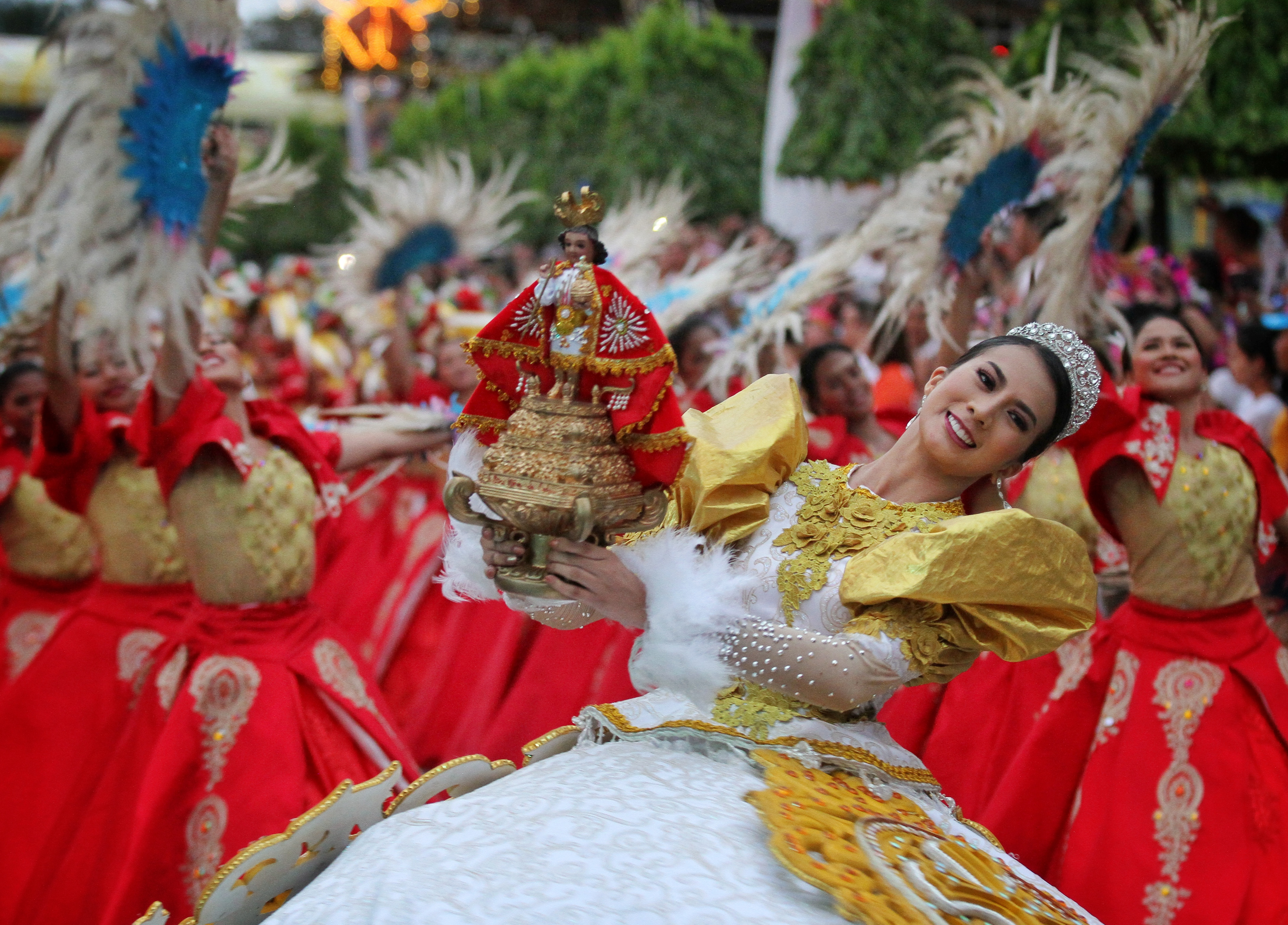
The Sinanduloy Cultural Troupe in the Sinulog 2020 Festival

Tangub, through its Sinanduloy Cultural Troupe, was a regular participant of the Sinulog Festival, a festival held in Cebu City. This festival is the pageantry of sights, sounds and colors as it honors and pays homage to Sr. Santo Niño, the child Jesus. The highlights of the festival is from January 9–18, yearly. Tangub City has won a record of twelve grand champion streak in the Sinulog-Based Category of the festival.

The city also has a festival called the Halad Sayaw Pasalamat Festival (lit. 'Dance Offering of Thanksgiving Festival'), formerly known as the Dalit Cultural Festival. It is held in honor of the city's patron saint, Saint Michael the Archangel. It is celebrated every September 29-the feast day of Michaelmas. It is participated by the city's barangays through clusters represented by local schools.

The Harvest Festival showcases various agricultural products for selling and promotion. The festival is a venue to promote the agri-tourism program of the city, creating business-matching opportunities for the people of Tangub City.

In recent years, Tangub has been popularly dubbed as the Christmas Symbols Capital of the Philippines. Every year, the city celebrates Christmas through the Tangub City Christmas Festival of Lights. During the month-long festival, the city fills with an array of illuminated holiday decor.

== Tourism ==
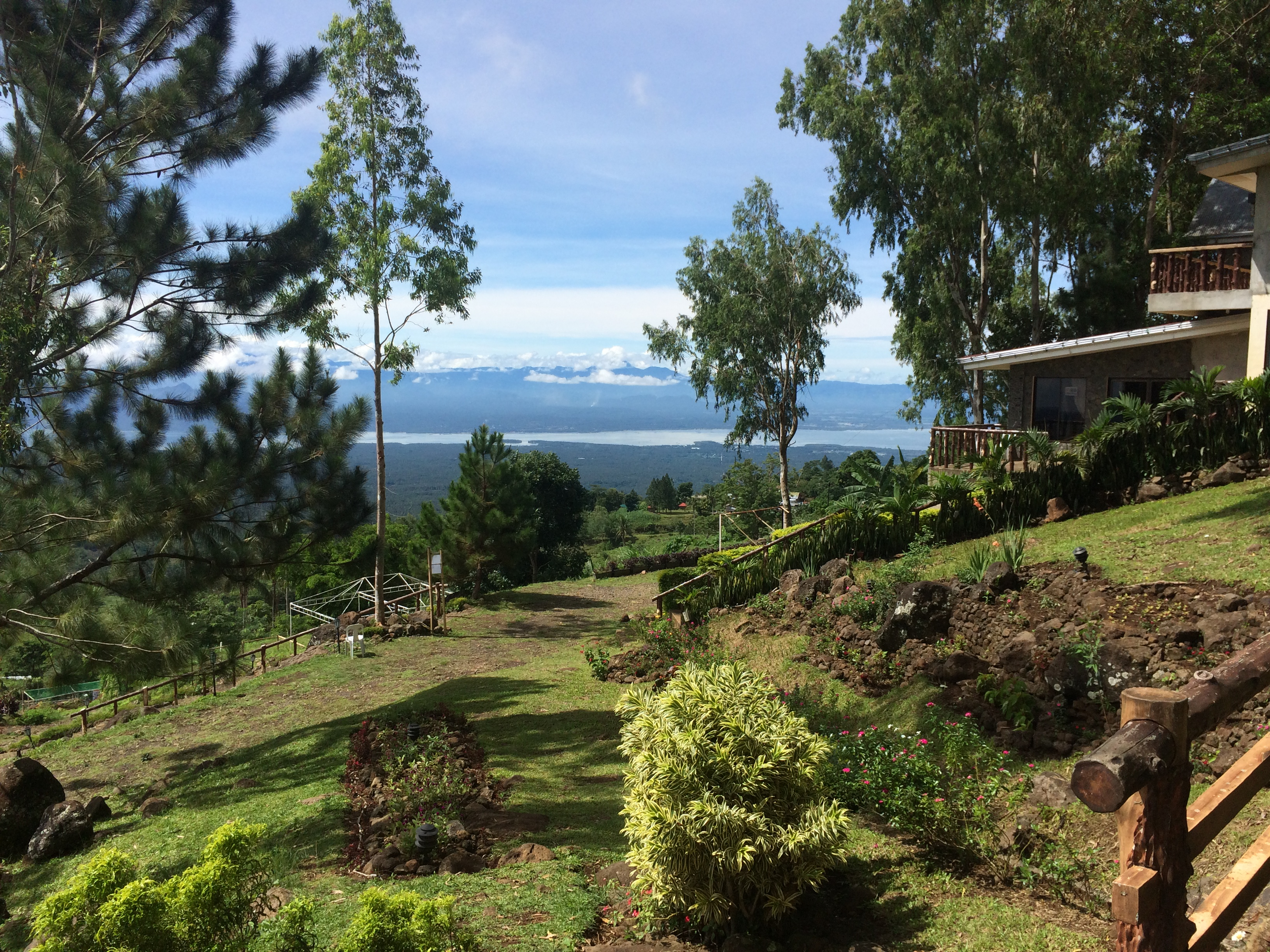
Hoyohoy Highland Stone Chapel Adventure Park

- Hoyohoy Highland Stone Chapel Adventure Park, is a nature park located on the outskirts of the city, on the slopes of Mount Malindang. The park provides a good view of Tangub and the Panguil Bay. Located 850 meters (2788.71 ft) above sea level, the park has a stone chapel, an organic herbal garden, a zipline which is said to be the longest in Asia which connects the hills to the mountains, and an agricultural learning institute.
- Asenso Global Gardens and View Deck, is an ecotourism destination located near the Hoyohoy Adventure Park. It is located almost 1,000 feet above sea level and covering 191 hectares of land, the gardens' landscape is filled with lush vegetation and shrubbery originating from different parts of the world. It also provides a clear view of Tangub, Ozamiz, and the nearby municipalities as well as the Panguil Bay. Construction is not finished, but it is open to the public.
- Memorial Hill is a small hill located inside the prison reservation compound. This is a crowd favorite not only because of its breathtaking scenery but also because of its historical significance. This hill has a World War II vintage Japanese canon. It is also the burial site of Eriberto B. Misa Jr, the famous prison director from 1937 to 1949.

== Government ==
Old seal of the city, NHCP version

Leadership

Tangub city officials 2025–2028:

- Mayor: Sabiniano "Ben" S. Canama (Asenso Pinoy)
- Vice mayor: Tito B. Decina (Asenso Pinoy)
- Congressman: Sancho Fernando “Ando” F. Oaminal (NP)
- City councilors:
  - Francisco I. Chiong Jr. (ASPIN)
  - Antonio S. Caylan Jr. (ASPIN)
  - Rubin R. Roma (ASPIN)
  - Hipolito G. Roxas Jr. (ASPIN)
  - Lowida L. Alcalde (ASPIN)
  - Marissa V. Amamio (ASPIN)
  - Romulo L. Del Socorro (ASPIN)
  - Leonido C. Tala Sr. (ASPIN)
  - Eddie S. Gomez (ASPIN)
  - Alexander M. Returerto (ASPIN)
  - ABC President Mary Grace D. Tabalba

== Sister cities ==
- Parañaque, Philippines
- Ozamiz, Philippines

== See also ==
- List of renamed cities and municipalities in the Philippines
