= Tudela, Misamis Occidental =

Municipality in Misamis Occidental, Philippines

Tudela
- Municipality
- Municipality of Tudela
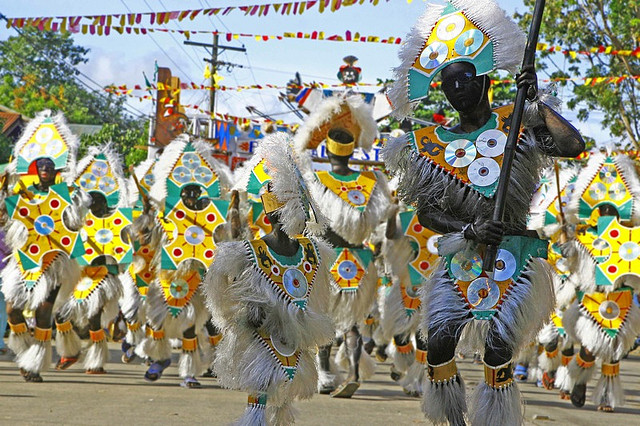
- Binalbal Festival

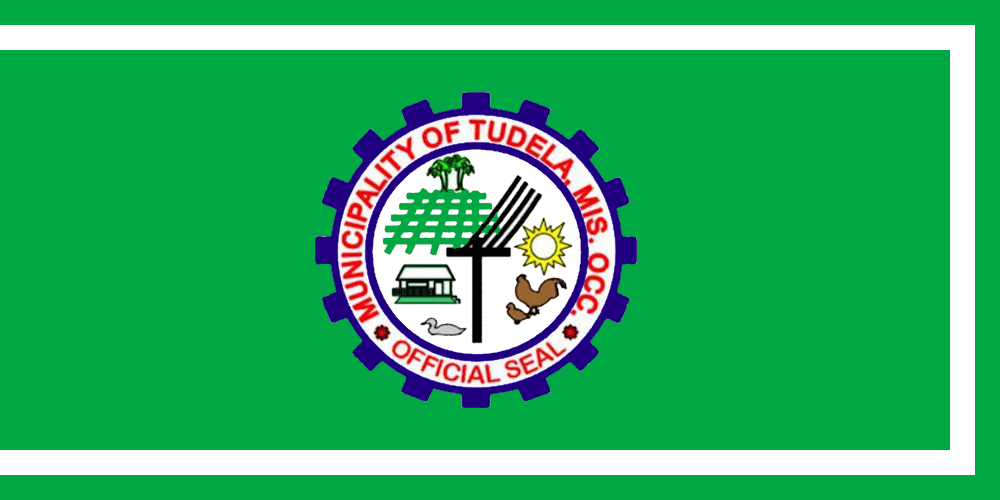
- Flag
- Motto: Abante Tudela!
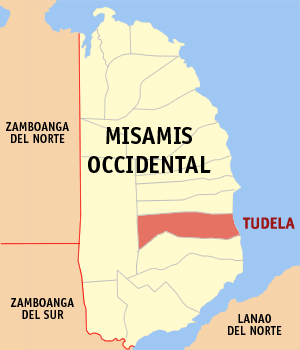
- Map of Misamis Occidental with Tudela highlighted
- Interactive map of Tudela
- Location within the Philippines
- Coordinates: 8°14′50″N 123°50′33″E
- Country: Philippines
- Region: Northern Mindanao
- Province: Misamis Occidental
- District: 2nd district
- Founded: December 28, 1920
- Named for: Tudela, Navarre
- Barangays: 33 (see Barangays)

Government
  - Type: Sangguniang Bayan
  - Mayor: Estela Obut-Estaño (ASPIN)
  - Vice Mayor: Wilma L. Parojinog (ASPIN)
  - Representative: Sancho Fernando F. Oaminal (Lakas)
  - Municipal Council: Members: Rosito Y. Tampoog Jr.; Joel L. Bodiongan; Nelvin C. Lague; Samuel L. Parojinog III; Juscille Sumabat-Gonzalez; Samuel A. Edusma III; Marites P. Mixdon; Felix C. Balais
  - Electorate: 19,421 voters (2025)

Area
  - Total: 98.52 km^{2} (38.04 sq mi)
- Elevation: 44 m (144 ft)

Population (2024 census)
  - Total: 29,082
  - Density: 295.2/km^{2} (764.5/sq mi)
  - Households: 7,123

Economy
  - Income class: 3rd municipal income class
  - Poverty incidence: 28.91% (2023)
  - Revenue: ₱ 162.2 million (2024)
  - Assets: ₱ 691.2 million (2024)
  - Expenditure: ₱ 47.84 million (2024)
  - Liabilities: ₱ 74.46 million (2024)

Service provider
  - Electricity: Misamis Occidental 2 Electric Cooperative (MOELCI 2)
- Time zone: UTC+8 (PST)
- ZIP code: 7202
- PSGC: 1004216000
- IDD : area code: +63 (0)88
- Native languages: Subanon; Cebuano; Tagalog
- Website: www.tudelamisocc.gov.ph

Tudela, officially the Municipality of Tudela, (Cebuano: Lungsod sa Tudela; Tagalog: Bayan ng Tudela), is a municipality in the province of Misamis Occidental, Philippines. According to the 2024 census, it has a population of 29,082 people.

Tudela is widely known for its colorful Binalbal Festival, where revelers are clad in gory costumes like a giant Halloween costume party. It is held every New Year's Day (January 1).

== History ==
=== Spanish colonial era ===
Tudela was founded in the late 19th century by Recollect friar Antonio Olleta as the visita, which he named after his hometown in Navarre, Spain. By 1884, the settlement had grown into a pueblo with four barrios. In 1893, Tudela was established as a parish, carved out from its mother parish of Misamis (now Ozamiz City)

=== Simbalagon era ===
Prior to its establishment as an independent parish in 1893, the settlement area that would become the municipality of Tudela was historically recognized in early regional cartography and ecclesiastical records as Simbalagon. During the late 19th century, the socio-economic and territorial development of the Simbalagon sector was structurally driven by agricultural expansion and migration movements originating from the prominent Principalía (secular ruling class) hubs of the mother parish of Palilan (modern-day Jimenez).

Local historical accounts indicate that the settlement was originally founded as a visita (a village with a chapel) by Recollect missionary Padre Antonio Olleta. Civil records document that by 1884, this settlement had expanded into an organized pueblo (township) consisting of four distinct barrios already operating under the name Tudela, establishing that the territory was named prior to the formal creation of the independent parish.

This Church-and-State administrative union relied directly on land endowments from the local Principalía to establish permanent institutional infrastructure. Don Lucresio Olevera Olarte, a major agricultural landowner who later served as a municipal Concejal (Councillor) of Jimenez until September 4, 1908, executed a private land donation from his extensive territorial coconut and cash-crop holdings in the Simbalagon plains between 1885 and 1892.

This land donation, consisting of a centrally located tract, was formally deeded to the Catholic Church under the jurisdiction of its mother parish in Misamis (now Ozamiz City) to provide the physical ground space required to erect the town's own chapel and plaza. This donation created the permanent geographic and civic core anchoring the pueblo's transition into a separate parish in 1893. Its remaining portions later became the site of San Isidro Academy in 1953.

=== American colonial era ===
The present territory of Tudela was once part of the former municipality of Loculan. Through Act No. 951, issued by the Philippine Commission on October 21, 1903, the number of municipalities in the then-undivided Misamis province was reduced from 24 to 10, Loculan was effectively abolished after being joined with the municipality of Misamis.

During the American occupation, the inhabitants in Loculan petitioned to be separated from Misamis and organized into two independent municipalities. Thus, Governor-General Francis Burton Harrison (through the efforts of Senator José F. Clarín) issued Executive Order (EO) No. 61 on December 28, 1920, creating the municipalities of Tudela and Clarin. Barrio Tudela became the seat of government of the municipality of Tudela. The organization became effective on New Year’s Day 1921.

The first appointed Municipal President was Primitivo Ninang and his first Vice-President was Peregrin Sengidas. The following councillors appointed were Pío Adecir, Simeón Fuentes, Gregorio Madula, Casimiro Rubio, Julio Maliao, Florentino Olarte, Félix Codilla, and Isidro Sol.

The first appointed municipal secretary was José M. Castaños, known as “Secretario Municipal Interino”. The Provincial Fiscal nominated him and it was approved by Municipal Council Res. No. 123, series of 1923.

Spanish was used in the preparation of minutes, resolutions and ordinances from 1921 up to 1928, and in the later part of 1929 during the term of Ulpiano Balazo as municipal president.

=== Territorial changes ===
Its territorial jurisdiction has been reduced in April 1924, by virtue of EO No. 20, Barrio Balicaocao was transferred to Clarin. In 1982, through Batas Pambansa Blg. 171, Barangays Tuno, Lalud, and Lampasan were annexed to the newly created Don Mariano Marcos (now Don Victoriano)

=== Martial law ===
The proclamation of martial law by President Ferdinand Marcos on 23 September 1972 began a 14-year dictatorship historically remembered for its human rights abuses, often involving the warrantless detention, murder, and physical, sexual, or mental torture of political opponents, student activists, journalists, religious workers, farmers, and others who fought against the Marcos dictatorship. These were often attributed to military-endorsed militias - including a number of armed cult groups - which were used to enhance the military's numbers as it fought various resistance movements.

A notable incident in Tudela during the Marcos dictatorship took place on August 24, 1981, when members of a fanatical pseudo-religious paramilitary sect called the "Rock Christ" strafed the house of the Gumapons, a Subanon family, in Sitio Gitason, Barrio Lampasan. Ten of the twelve persons in the house, including an infant, were killed.

== Geography ==
Tudela is bounded on the north by the municipality of Sinacaban, to the south by the municipality of Clarin, to the east by Iligan Bay, and to the west by the municipality of Don Victoriano and Mount Malindang. It is a 20-minute drive from Ozamiz City to the south, and a 45-minute drive from Oroquieta City to the north.

=== Barangays ===
Tudela is politically subdivided into 33 barangays. Each barangay consists of puroks while some have sitios.

- Balon
- Barra
- Basirang
- Bongabong
- Buenavista
- Cabol-anonan
- Cahayag
- Camating
- Canibungan Proper
- Casilak San Agustin
- Centro Hulpa (Poblacion)
- Centro Napu (Poblacion)
- Centro Upper (Poblacion)
- Colambutan Bajo
- Colambutan Settlement
- Duanguican
- Gala
- Gumbil
- Locso-on
- Maikay
- Maribojoc
- Mitugas
- Nailon
- Namut
- Napurog
- Pan-ay Diot
- San Nicolas
- Sebac
- Silongon
- Sinuza
- Taguima
- Tigdok
- Yahong

=== Climate ===
Climate data for Tudela, Misamis Occidental
Month	Jan	Feb	Mar	Apr	May	Jun	Jul	Aug	Sep	Oct	Nov	Dec	Year
Mean daily maximum °C (°F)	28 (82)	28 (82)	29 (84)	31 (88)	31 (88)	30 (86)	30 (86)	30 (86)	30 (86)	30 (86)	29 (84)	28 (82)	30 (85)
Mean daily minimum °C (°F)	23 (73)	23 (73)	23 (73)	23 (73)	24 (75)	24 (75)	24 (75)	24 (75)	24 (75)	24 (75)	24 (75)	23 (73)	24 (74)
Average precipitation mm (inches)	69 (2.7)	44 (1.7)	37 (1.5)	29 (1.1)	87 (3.4)	137 (5.4)	131 (5.2)	141 (5.6)	143 (5.6)	134 (5.3)	68 (2.7)	53 (2.1)	1,073 (42.3)
Average rainy days	9.9	7.6	7.4	8.1	21.6	26.5	26.4	26.6	25.8	24.3	15.1	10.4	209.7
Source: Meteoblue

== Demographics ==
Population census of Tudela

Year	Pop.	±% p.a.
1939	11,057	—
1948	11,477	+0.42%
1960	13,361	+1.27%
1970	17,877	+2.95%
1975	19,625	+1.89%
1980	21,893	+2.21%
1990	19,070	−1.37%

Year	Pop.	±% p.a.
1995	22,805	+3.41%
2000	23,047	+0.23%
2007	25,113	+1.19%
2010	27,371	+3.18%
2015	28,932	+1.06%
2020	28,599	−0.24%
2024	29,082	+0.40%

Source: Philippine Statistics Authority

In the 2024 census, the population of Tudela was 29,082 people, with a density of 300 inhabitants per square kilometre or 780 inhabitants per square mile.

=== Religion ===
Places of worship:

- San Isidro Labrador Parish Church (Roman Catholic) - Purok 1, Upper Centro
- United Church of Christ in the Philippines - Upper Centro
- Kingdom Hall of Jehovah's Witnesses - Purok 1, Taguima
- Seventh Day Adventist Church - Basirang; Nailon
- Kristohanon (Church of Tudela) - Purok 1, Barra
- Liberty Bible Baptist Church (Bible Baptist) - Taguima
- Iglesia Filipina Independiente (IFI) - Hulpa
- Church of the Back to Christ Royal Family in the 7th Millenium - Silongon
- Grace Gospel Church of Christ, TCM - Cabol-anonan
- Grace Banner Fellowship, TCM - Purok 7, Balon
- Christ's Banner Fellowship - Nailon
- Assembly Of God - Purok 3, Centro Napu

== Economy ==
Poverty incidence of Tudela (%)

Source: Philippine Statistics Authority

The majority of the population depends on agriculture and fishing. Commerce is also progressive in this municipality. People in the municipality and of the neighboring barangays of Clarin and Sinacaban towns depend on the local market, instead of going to Ozamiz City, the economic hub in the province.

Crops: Palay, corn, banana, kamoteng-kahoy (cassava), sweet potato, coconut, fruits (mango, durian, lanzones), and vegetables.

Products: aquaculture products: shrimps, prawns, crabs, tilapia, bangus (milkfish); furniture; poultry products; breads and pastries; fishes and shells.

== Tourism ==
- Binalbal Festival - held every January 1, one of the oldest and longest running festival in the municipality as it can be traced back to as early as the 1920s.
- Araw ng Tudela - held every December 28
- Mount Malindang Association of Southeast Asian Nations (ASEAN) Heritage Park
- Barra Beach, Barra
- Camarin Beach, Camarin, Cabol-anonan
- Tudela Market Place
- Bagsakan Center
- Tudela Highland Resort and Eco Park (formerly known as The Subanen Village), Sitio Tonggo, Namut

== Government ==
The governance of Tudela is managed by the elected, appointed and OIC Mayors from 1921 up to the present, as follows:

- 1921-1928 - Primitivo Ninang, first appointed
- 1928-1935 - Ulpiano Balazo, appointed
- 1935-1937 - Alberto Raagas, appointed
- 1938-1940 - Jose Singson, elected
- 1940-1943 - Alberto Raagas, elected
- 1943-1946 - Eladio Lagura, elected
- 1946-1947 - Eligio Dajao, appointed
- Feb. 1947 - Dec.1947 - Antonio Enriquez, appointed
- 1948-1959 - Gregorio Gamotin, elected
- 1960-1986 - Antero Singidas, elected
- 1986-1988 - Bernadette P. Encinareal, OIC
- Dec. 1988 - Feb. 1989 - Panfilo S. Olarte, OIC
- Mar. 1989 - Apr. 1989 - Nilo Y. Obut, OIC
- 1989- 1992 - Bernadette P. Encinareal, elected
- 1992- 2001 - Felix L. Sarigumba, elected
- 2001-2007 - Nilo Y. Obut, elected
- 2007-2016 - Estela Obut-Estaño, elected
- 2016-2025 - Samuel L. Parojinog, elected
- 2025-present - Estela Obut-Estaño, elected

== Infrastructure ==
=== Transportation ===
Air
Tudela is accessible by plane and is served by the Ozamiz Airport. There is a short tricycle ride to the Ozamiz City Integrated Bus Terminal, where a local public utility vehicle known as a "balik-balik" provides transportation to Tudela.

Sea
Served by the Port of Ozamiz. From the port, travelers may take a tricycle to the Ozamiz City Integrated Bus Terminal, where public utility vehicles provide transportation to Tudela.

Land
The public mode of transportation within this municipality is usually by tricycle and habal-habal, while the balik-balik is a means of transport to and from Ozamiz City, the nearest city.

=== Utilities ===
Communication
Telecommunications and internet are available. Mobile phone networks (Smart, Globe, Sun Cellular (now part of Smart) and DITO Telecommunity) operate extensively in the municipality.

PhilPost has its office in the Municipal Hall. Most of the municipality is serviceable by commercial couriers (e.g. LBC, JRS Express, Air21, 2GO, etc.) based in Ozamiz City.

Electricity
All 33 barangays are energized by Misamis Occidental II Electric Cooperative, Inc. (MOELCI II).

Water
Poblacion area is served by the Metro Ozamiz Water District (MOWD). Rural barangays have their own water systems funded by the government.

== Education ==
=== Preschool ===
Every barangay in the municipality has their own day care center under the supervision of the Department of Social Welfare and Development.

- San Isidro Academy Pre-school Department
- Ozamiz Elementary School Pre-school Department
- There are also church-operated pre-schools in the Poblacion.
- Tudela Liberty Baptist Christian School Pre-school Department

=== Elementary ===
- Balon Elementary School
- Barra Elementary School
- Basirang Elementary School
- Bongabong Elementary School
- Cabol-Anonan Elementary School
- Camating Elementary School
- Colambutan Bajo Elementary School
- Sebac Elementary School
- Tudela Central Elementary School
- Tigdok Elementary School
- Tonggo Elementary School
- Upper Centro Elementary School
- Gumbil Elementary School

=== Secondary ===
- Tudela National Comprehensive High School
- San Isidro Academy of Tudela Inc.
- Northwestern Mindanao Christian Colleges, Inc., founded as Northern Mindanao Academy in 1946
- Colambotan Bajo National High School, the first public secondary school in the municipality

=== Tertiary ===
- Northwestern Mindanao Christian Colleges, Inc.. Founded as Northern Mindanao Academy in 1946.

=== Technical vocation ===
- Northwestern Mindanao Christian Colleges, Inc.
