= Misamis Occidental's 2nd congressional district =

Legislative district of the Philippines

- Constituency for the House of Representatives of the Philippines
- Location of Misamis Occidental within the Philippines
- Province: Misamis Occidental
- Region: Northern Mindanao
- Population: 346,320 (2024)
- Electorate: 232,485 (2022)
- Major settlements: 7 LGUs: Cities; Ozamiz; Tangub; Municipalities; Bonifacio; Clarin; Don Victoriano; Sinacaban; Tudela
- Area: 1,054.46 km^{2} (407.13 sq mi)

Current constituency
- Created: 1987
- Representative: Sancho Fernando F. Oaminal
- Political party: Lakas-CMD
- Congressional bloc: Majority

Misamis Occidental's 2nd congressional district is one of the two congressional districts of the Philippines in the province of Misamis Occidental. It has been represented in the House of Representatives since 1987. The district encompasses the southern half of the province consisting of its largest city, Ozamiz, the adjacent city of Tangub, and the municipalities of Bonifacio, Clarin, Don Victoriano, Sinacaban and Tudela. It is currently represented in the 20th Congress by Sancho Fernando Oaminal of the Lakas-CMD

== Representation history ==
| # | Image | Member | Term of office | | Congress | Party | Electoral history | Constituent LGUs |
| # | Image | Member | Start | End | Congress | Party | Electoral history | Constituent LGUs |
|---|---|---|---|---|---|---|---|---|
=== Misamis Occidental's 2nd district for the House of Representatives of the Philippines ===
District created February 2, 1987 from Misamis Occidental's at-large district.
| 1 | | Hilarion J. Ramiro Jr. | June 30, 1987 | June 30, 1995 | 8th | PDP–Laban | Elected in 1987. | 1987–1992; Bonifacio, Clarin, Don Mariano Marcos, Ozamiz, Sinacaban, Tangub, Tudela |
| 1 | | Hilarion J. Ramiro Jr. | June 30, 1987 | June 30, 1995 | 9th | Lakas | Re-elected in 1992. | 1992–present Bonifacio, Clarin, Don Victoriano, Ozamiz, Sinacaban, Tangub, Tudela |
| 2 | | Herminia M. Ramiro | June 30, 1995 | June 30, 1998 | 10th | Lakas | Elected in 1995. | 1992–present Bonifacio, Clarin, Don Victoriano, Ozamiz, Sinacaban, Tangub, Tudela |
| (1) | | Hilarion J. Ramiro Jr. | June 30, 1998 | January 5, 2001 | 11th | Independent | Elected in 1998. Died in office. | 1992–present Bonifacio, Clarin, Don Victoriano, Ozamiz, Sinacaban, Tangub, Tudela |
| — | vacant | | January 5, 2001 | June 30, 2001 | 11th | — | No special election held to fill vacancy. | 1992–present Bonifacio, Clarin, Don Victoriano, Ozamiz, Sinacaban, Tangub, Tudela |
| (2) | | Herminia M. Ramiro | June 30, 2001 | June 30, 2010 | 12th | Lakas | Elected in 2001. | 1992–present Bonifacio, Clarin, Don Victoriano, Ozamiz, Sinacaban, Tangub, Tudela |
| (2) | | Herminia M. Ramiro | June 30, 2001 | June 30, 2010 | 13th | NUP | Re-elected in 2004. | 1992–present Bonifacio, Clarin, Don Victoriano, Ozamiz, Sinacaban, Tangub, Tudela |
| (2) | | Herminia M. Ramiro | June 30, 2001 | June 30, 2010 | 14th | NUP | Re-elected in 2007. | 1992–present Bonifacio, Clarin, Don Victoriano, Ozamiz, Sinacaban, Tangub, Tudela |
| 3 | | Engr. Loreto Leo Ocampos | June 30, 2010 | June 30, 2013 | 15th | Liberal | Elected in 2010. | 1992–present Bonifacio, Clarin, Don Victoriano, Ozamiz, Sinacaban, Tangub, Tudela |
| 4 | | Atty. Henry S. Oaminal Sr. | June 30, 2013 | June 30, 2022 | 16th | Nacionalista | Elected in 2013. | 1992–present Bonifacio, Clarin, Don Victoriano, Ozamiz, Sinacaban, Tangub, Tudela |
| 4 | | Atty. Henry S. Oaminal Sr. | June 30, 2013 | June 30, 2022 | 17th | Nacionalista | Re-elected in 2016. | 1992–present Bonifacio, Clarin, Don Victoriano, Ozamiz, Sinacaban, Tangub, Tudela |
| 4 | | Atty. Henry S. Oaminal Sr. | June 30, 2013 | June 30, 2022 | 18th | Nacionalista | Re-elected in 2019. | 1992–present Bonifacio, Clarin, Don Victoriano, Ozamiz, Sinacaban, Tangub, Tudela |
| 5 | | Sancho Fernando F. Oaminal | June 30, 2022 | Incumbent | 19th | Nacionalista | Elected in 2022. | 1992–present Bonifacio, Clarin, Don Victoriano, Ozamiz, Sinacaban, Tangub, Tudela |
| 5 | | Sancho Fernando F. Oaminal | June 30, 2022 | Incumbent | 20th | Lakas | Re-elected in 2025. | 1992–present Bonifacio, Clarin, Don Victoriano, Ozamiz, Sinacaban, Tangub, Tudela |

== Election results ==
=== 2025 ===
| Candidate | Party | Votes | % |
|---|---|---|---|
| Ando Oaminal (incumbent) | Lakas–CMD | 176,532 | 93.35 |
| Rudy Luna | National Unity Party | 12,584 | 6.65 |
| Total | | 189,116 | 100.00 |
| Valid votes | | 189,116 | 94.07 |
| Invalid/blank votes | | 11,931 | 5.93 |
| Total votes | | 201,047 | 100.00 |
| Registered voters/turnout | | 237,177 | 84.77 |
| Lakas–CMD hold | | | |
Source: Commission on Elections

=== 2022 ===
2022 Philippine House of Representatives elections
| Party | Candidate | Votes | % |
|---|---|---|---|
| Nacionalista | Ando Oaminal | 141,322 | 76.31 |
| LDP | Jenny Tan | 43,000 | 23.22 |
| PFP | Rondy Conol-Jimenez | 873 | 0.47 |
| Margin of victory | | 98,322 | 53.09 |
| Total votes | | 185,195 | 100 |
| Nacionalista hold | | | |

=== 2016 ===
2016 Philippine House of Representatives elections
| Party | Candidate | Votes | % |
|---|---|---|---|
| Nacionalista | Henry S. Oaminal | 115,833 | 100.00% |
| Total votes | | 115,833 | 100.00% |

=== 2013 ===
2013 Philippine House of Representatives elections
| Party | Candidate | Votes | % | ±% |
|---|---|---|---|---|
| Nacionalista | Henry Oaminal | | | |
| Liberal | Loreto Leo Ocampos | | | |
| Margin of victory | | | | |
| Rejected ballots | | | | |
| Turnout | | | | |
| Nacionalista gain from Liberal | | Swing | | |

=== 2010 ===
| Candidate | Party | Votes | % |
|---|---|---|---|
| Loreto Leo Ocampos | Liberal Party | 50,131 | 37.60 |
| Reynaldo Parojinog Sr. | Lakas–Kampi–CMD | 49,140 | 36.86 |
| Jennifer Tan | Nationalist People's Coalition | 33,481 | 25.11 |
| Alfredo Paglinawan | Independent | 576 | 0.43 |
| Total | | 133,328 | 100.00 |
| Valid votes | | 133,328 | 94.46 |
| Invalid/blank votes | | 7,818 | 5.54 |
| Total votes | | 141,146 | 100.00 |
| Liberal Party gain from Lakas–Kampi–CMD | | | |
Source: Commission on Elections

== See also ==
- Legislative districts of Misamis Occidental
