= Bonifacio, Misamis Occidental =

Municipality in Misamis Occidental, Philippines

Bonifacio
- Municipality
- Municipality of Bonifacio
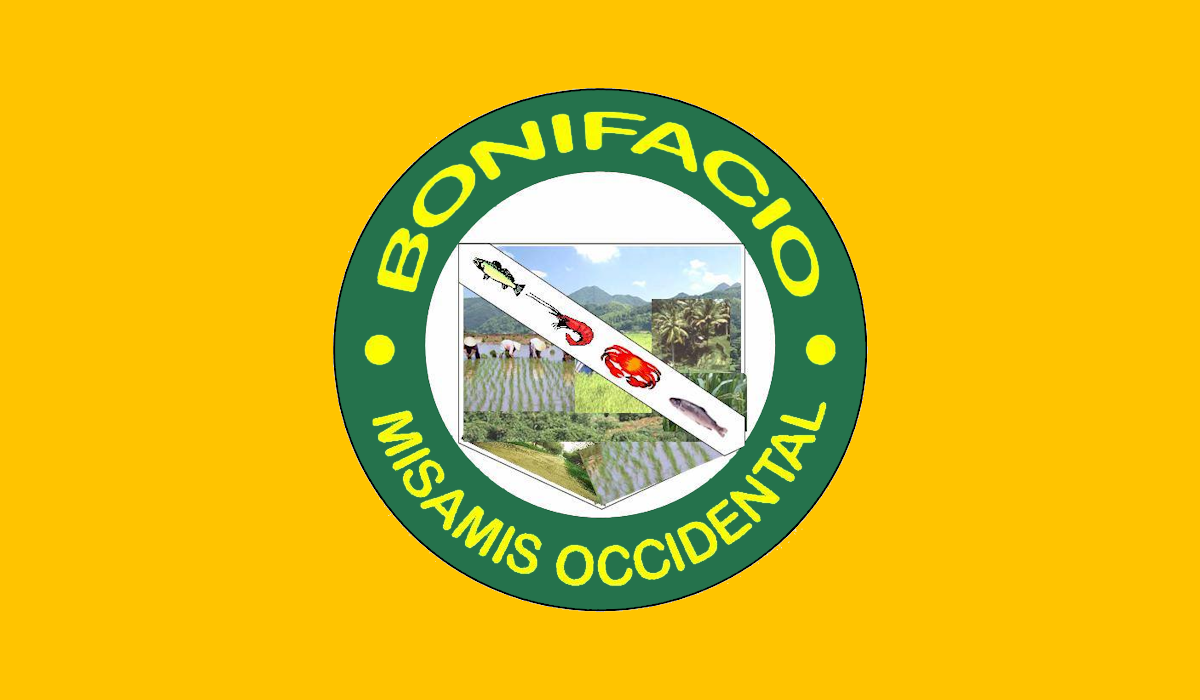
- Flag

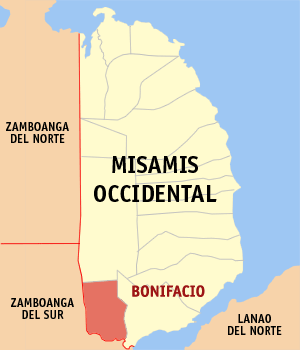
- Map of Misamis Occidental with Bonifacio highlighted
- Interactive map of Bonifacio
- Location within the Philippines
- Coordinates: 8°03′10″N 123°36′49″E
- Country: Philippines
- Region: Northern Mindanao
- Province: Misamis Occidental
- District: 2nd district
- Founded: January 2, 1940
- Founder: Demetrio P. Fernan
- Named for: Andres Bonifacio
- Barangays: 28 (see Barangays)

Government
  - Type: Sangguniang Bayan
  - Mayor: Ricky R. Bulahan (ASPIN)
  - Vice Mayor: Fe B. Manzo (ASPIN)
  - Representative: Sancho Fernando F. Oaminal (Lakas)
  - Municipal Council: Members: Gilbert A. Aljas; Charlex G. Chatto; Emmanuel D. Cuizon; Aldy L. Arado; Jeffy A. Tillor; Sylvia B. Cabuguas; Joseph Jessie A. Diamante; Carmelita A. Dago-oc
  - Electorate: 22,922 voters (2025)

Area
  - Total: 155.02 km^{2} (59.85 sq mi)
- Elevation: 113 m (371 ft)
- Highest elevation: 486 m (1,594 ft)
- Lowest elevation: −1 m (−3.3 ft)

Population (2024 census)
  - Total: 34,942
  - Density: 225.40/km^{2} (583.79/sq mi)
  - Households: 8,486

Economy
  - Income class: 2nd municipal income class
  - Poverty incidence: 37.35% (2023)
  - Revenue: ₱ 183.8 million (2024)
  - Assets: ₱ 696.8 million (2024)
  - Expenditure: ₱ 200.4 million (2024)
  - Liabilities: ₱ 155.8 million (2024)

Service provider
  - Electricity: Misamis Occidental 2 Electric Cooperative (MOELCI 2)
- Time zone: UTC+8 (PST)
- ZIP code: 7215
- PSGC: 1004203000
- IDD : area code: +63 (0)88
- Native languages: Subanon; Cebuano; Tagalog
- Website: www.bonifaciomisocc.gov.ph

Bonifacio, officially the Municipality of Bonifacio (Cebuano: Lungsod sa Bonifacio; Tagalog: Bayan ng Bonifacio), is a municipality in the province of Misamis Occidental, Philippines. According to the 2024 census, it had a population of 34,942 people.

The town of Bonifacio was established in 1942 by Don Demetrio P. Fernan, who also became the town's first mayor.

== History ==
Bonifacio was created as the 11th municipality of Misamis Occidental through Executive Order No. 242, issued by President Manuel L. Quezon on December 28, 1939, which organized six barrios that had separated from Tangub. The organization took effect on January 2, 1940.

== Geography ==
=== Barangays ===
Bonifacio is politically subdivided into 28 barangays. Each barangay consists of puroks while some have sitios.

- Bag-ong Anonang
- Bagumbang
- Baybay
- Bolinsong
- Buenavista
- Buracan
- Calolot
- Dimalco
- Dullan
- Kanaokanao
- Liloan
- Linconan
- Lodiong
- Lower Usugan
- Mapurog (Migsale)
- Migpange
- Montol
- Pisa-an
- Poblacion
- Remedios
- Rufino Lumapas
- Sibuyon
- Tangab
- Tiaman
- Tusik
- Upper Usogan
- Demetrio Fernan
- Digson

=== Climate ===
Climate data for Bonifacio, Misamis Occidental
Month	Jan	Feb	Mar	Apr	May	Jun	Jul	Aug	Sep	Oct	Nov	Dec	Year
Mean daily maximum °C (°F)	29 (84)	29 (84)	30 (86)	31 (88)	30 (86)	29 (84)	29 (84)	29 (84)	29 (84)	29 (84)	29 (84)	29 (84)	29 (85)
Mean daily minimum °C (°F)	22 (72)	22 (72)	22 (72)	23 (73)	24 (75)	24 (75)	23 (73)	23 (73)	23 (73)	23 (73)	23 (73)	24 (75)	23 (73)
Average precipitation mm (inches)	69 (2.7)	58 (2.3)	67 (2.6)	60 (2.4)	109 (4.3)	114 (4.5)	83 (3.3)	78 (3.1)	76 (3.0)	92 (3.6)	86 (3.4)	63 (2.5)	955 (37.7)
Average rainy days	12.8	11.6	14.8	17.4	24.8	23.5	20.7	18.5	17.4	22.5	21.6	15.6	221.2
Source: Meteoblue

== Demographics ==
Population census of Bonifacio

Year	Pop.	±% p.a.
1948	13,080	—
1960	13,478	+0.25%
1970	16,095	+1.79%
1975	20,398	+4.87%
1980	20,861	+0.45%
1990	24,439	+1.60%
1995	27,517	+2.25%

Year	Pop.	±% p.a.
2000	27,810	+0.23%
2007	29,514	+0.82%
2010	30,904	+1.69%
2015	32,345	+0.87%
2020	34,558	+1.40%
2024	34,942	+0.27%

Source: Philippine Statistics Authority

In the 2024 census, the population of Bonifacio was 34,942 people, with a density of 230 inhabitants per square kilometre or 600 inhabitants per square mile.

== Economy ==
Poverty incidence of Bonifacio (%)

Source: Philippine Statistics Authority
