= Sinacaban =

Municipality in Misamis Occidental, Philippines

- Municipality
- Municipality of Sinacaban
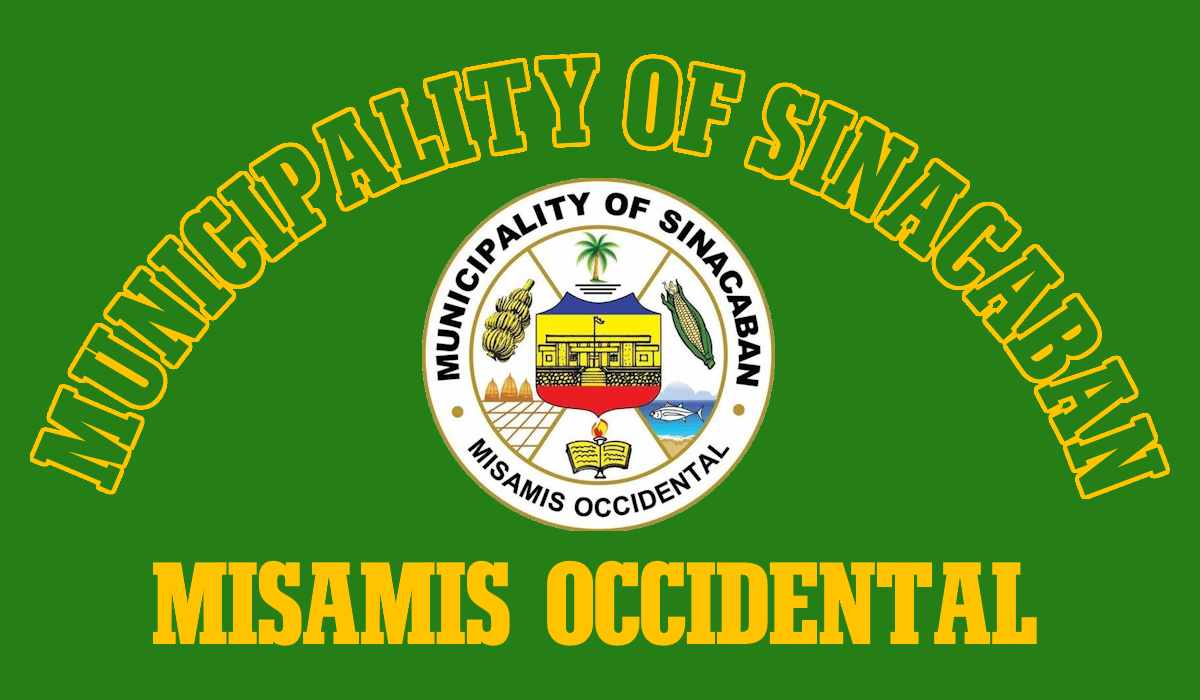
- Flag

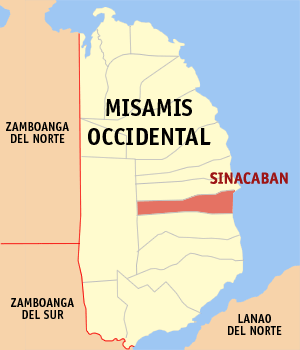
- Map of Misamis Occidental with Sinacaban highlighted
- Interactive map of Sinacaban
- Location within the Philippines
- Coordinates: 8°17′07″N 123°50′37″E
- Country: Philippines
- Region: Northern Mindanao
- Province: Misamis Occidental
- District: 2nd district
- Founded: August 30, 1949
- Barangays: 17 (see Barangays)

Government
  - Type: Sangguniang Bayan
  - Mayor: Dello T. Lood (ASPIN)
  - Vice Mayor: Keene T. Barquin (ASPIN)
  - Representative: Sancho Fernando F. Oaminal (Lakas)
  - Municipal Council: Members: Nelson V. Mercado; Robert C. Te; Raem A. Naranjo; Christian Jack P. Vente; Dianne Shayne D. Aganos; Isidro V. Macalisang; Bernardino B. Tiu Sr.; Gloria A. Tiu
  - Electorate: 15,060 voters (2025)

Area
  - Total: 99.09 km^{2} (38.26 sq mi)
- Elevation: 54 m (177 ft)
- Highest elevation: 235 m (771 ft)
- Lowest elevation: 0 m (0 ft)

Population (2024 census)
  - Total: 20,176
  - Density: 203.6/km^{2} (527.4/sq mi)
  - Households: 4,912

Economy
  - Income class: 4th municipal income class
  - Poverty incidence: 28.92% (2023)
  - Revenue: ₱ 133.6 million (2024)
  - Assets: ₱ 359.3 million (2024)
  - Expenditure: ₱ 44.7 million (2024)
  - Liabilities: ₱ 83.45 million (2024)

Service provider
  - Electricity: Misamis Occidental 2 Electric Cooperative (MOELCI 2)
- Time zone: UTC+8 (PST)
- ZIP code: 7203
- PSGC: 1004214000
- IDD : area code: +63 (0)88
- Native languages: Subanon; Cebuano; Tagalog
- Website: www.sinacabanmisocc.gov.ph

Sinacaban, officially the Municipality of Sinacaban (Cebuano: Lungsod sa Sinacaban; Tagalog: Bayan ng Sinacaban), is a municipality in the province of Misamis Occidental, Philippines. According to the 2024 census, it has a population of 20,176 people.

== History ==
On November 14, 1959, re-elected mayor Sofronio Avanceña was shot and killed by rival mayoral candidate Victor Simbajon whom he defeated in the local election held on November 10. Simbajon was joined by three of his sons and one other companion during the incident, three of whom, including Simbajon, were arrested shortly after by the Philippine Constabulary who smelled liquor on them.

== Geography ==
=== Barangays ===
Sinacaban is politically subdivided into 17 barangays. Each barangay consists of puroks while some have sitios.

- Cagay-anon
- Camanse
- Colupan Alto
- Colupan Bajo
- Dinas
- Estrella
- Katipunan
- Libertad Alto
- Libertad Bajo
- Poblacion
- San Isidro Alto
- San Isidro Bajo
- San Vicente
- Señor
- Sinonoc
- San Lorenzo Ruiz (Sungan)
- Tipan

=== Climate ===
Climate data for Sinacaban, Misamis Occidental
Month	Jan	Feb	Mar	Apr	May	Jun	Jul	Aug	Sep	Oct	Nov	Dec	Year
Mean daily maximum °C (°F)	27 (81)	28 (82)	29 (84)	31 (88)	31 (88)	30 (86)	30 (86)	30 (86)	30 (86)	30 (86)	29 (84)	28 (82)	29 (85)
Mean daily minimum °C (°F)	23 (73)	23 (73)	23 (73)	23 (73)	24 (75)	24 (75)	23 (73)	23 (73)	24 (75)	24 (75)	23 (73)	23 (73)	23 (74)
Average precipitation mm (inches)	69 (2.7)	44 (1.7)	37 (1.5)	29 (1.1)	87 (3.4)	137 (5.4)	131 (5.2)	141 (5.6)	143 (5.6)	134 (5.3)	68 (2.7)	53 (2.1)	1,073 (42.3)
Average rainy days	9.9	7.6	7.4	8.1	21.6	26.5	26.4	26.6	25.8	24.3	15.1	10.4	209.7
Source: Meteoblue

== Demographics ==
Population census of Sinacaban

Year	Pop.	±% p.a.
1960	10,182	—
1970	11,871	+1.54%
1975	12,806	+1.53%
1980	15,498	+3.89%
1990	14,846	−0.43%
1995	14,735	−0.14%

Year	Pop.	±% p.a.
2000	16,030	+1.82%
2007	16,772	+0.63%
2010	18,597	+3.83%
2015	18,391	−0.21%
2020	19,671	+1.43%
2024	20,176	+0.61%

Source: Philippine Statistics Authority

In the 2024 census, the population of Sinacaban was 20,176 people, with a density of 200 inhabitants per square kilometre or 520 inhabitants per square mile.

== Economy ==
Poverty incidence of Sinacaban (%)

Source: Philippine Statistics Authority
