= List of ports in the Philippines =

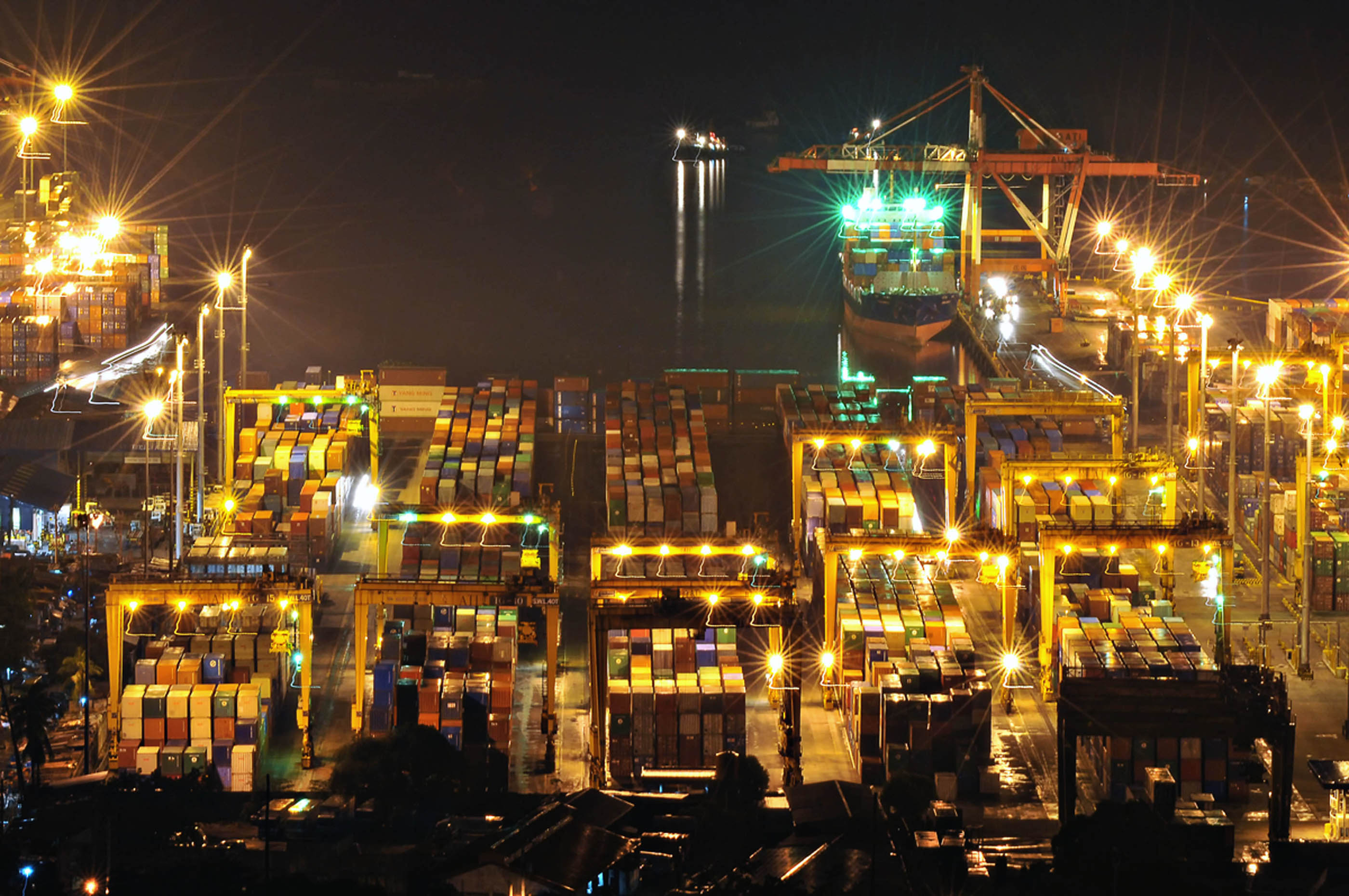
Port of Manila, one of the world's busiest container ports

The following is a list of major ports in the Philippines organized by water mass. This list consists primarily of shipping ports, but also includes some that are primarily or significantly devoted to other purposes: cruises, fishing, local delivery, and marinas.

== West Philippine Sea ==
The West of the Philippines.

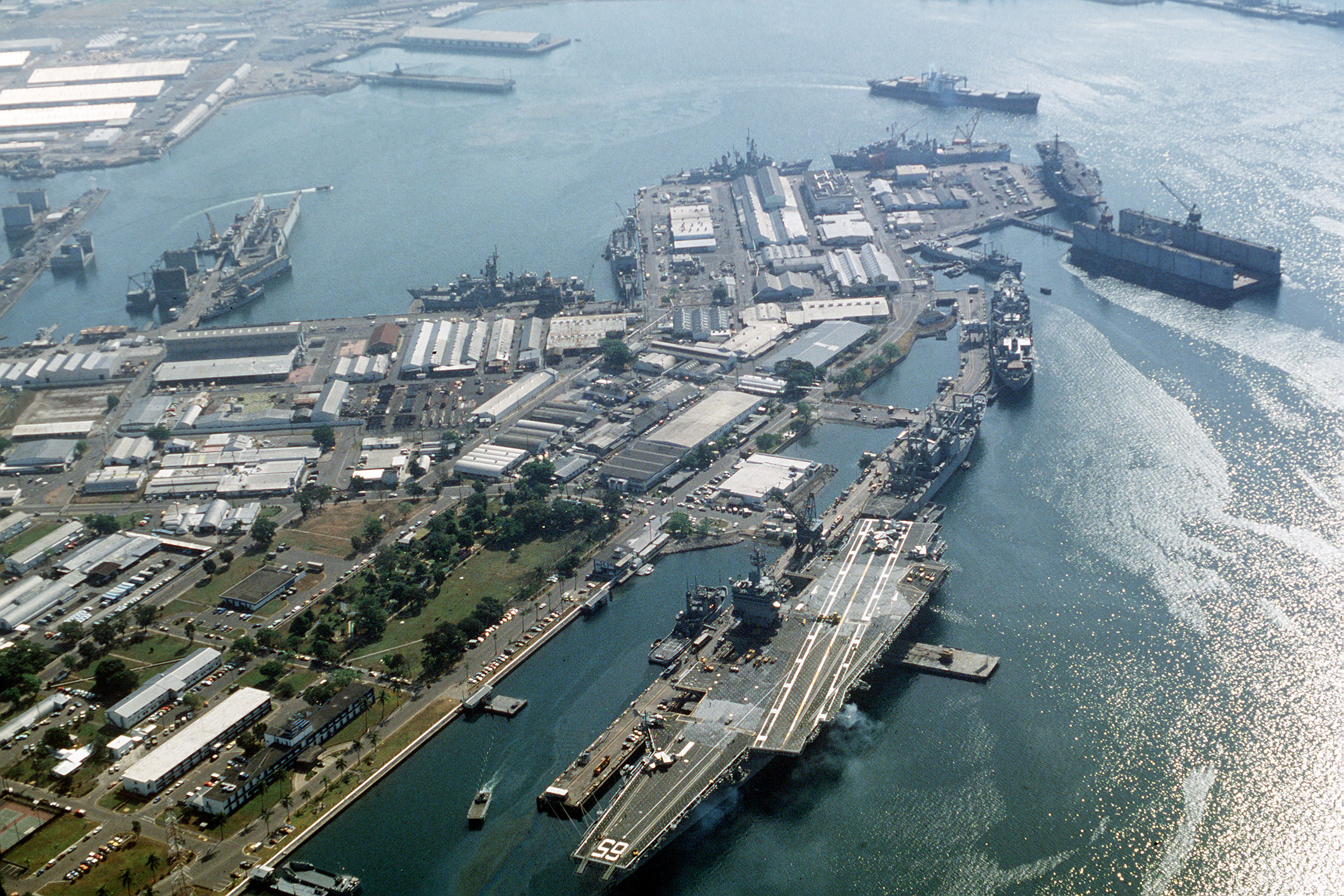
Port of Subic, the former US Navy base and now a major cruise and transhipment hub

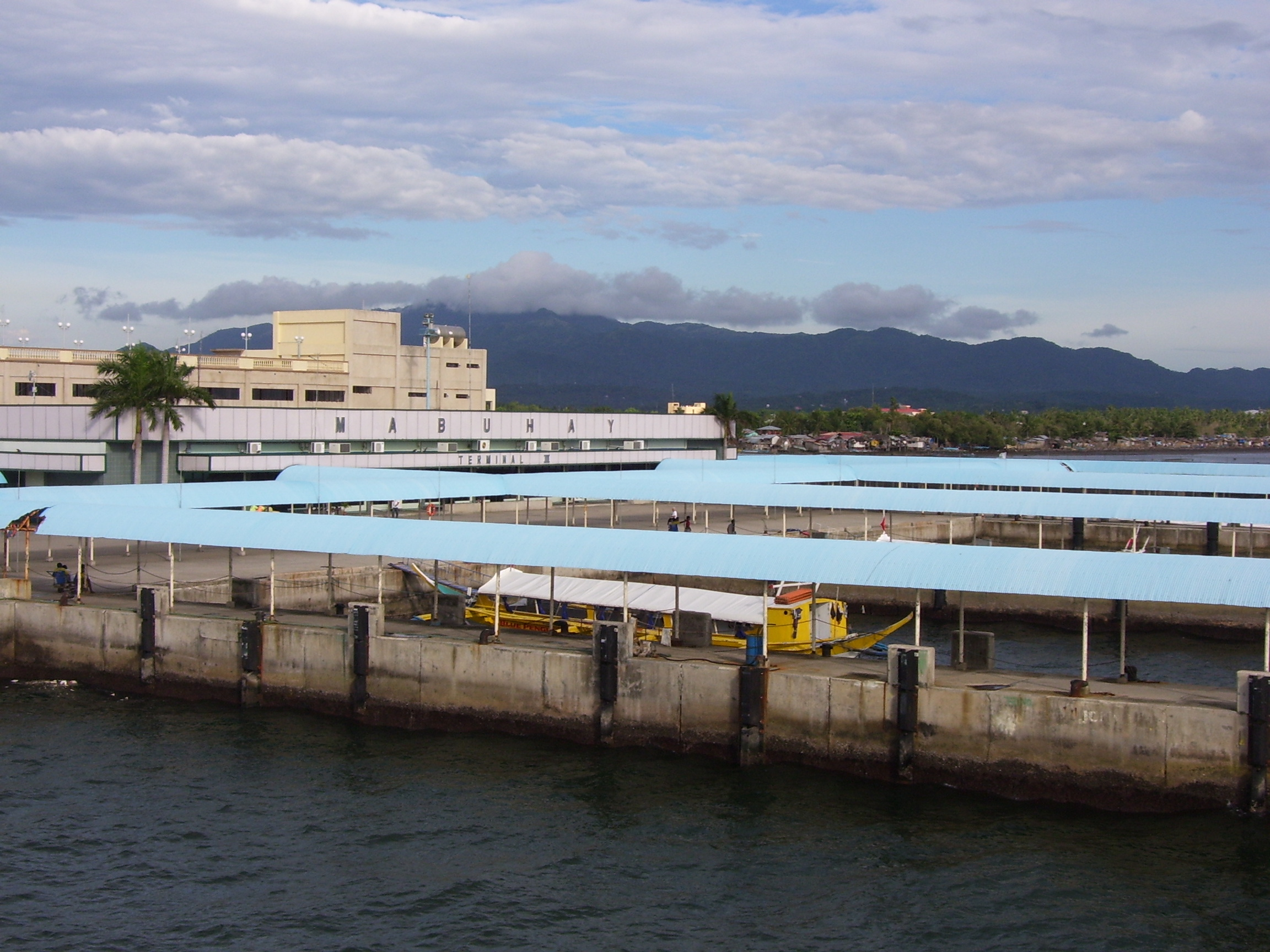
Port of Batangas, the Philippines' largest oil port and a major ro-ro terminal

Port of	Island	Water body
Abra de Ilog	Mindoro	Verde Island Passage
Alaminos (Lucap Port)	Luzon	Lingayen Gulf
Balabac	Balabac	
Batangas	Luzon	Batangas Bay
Cabugao (Salomague Port)	Luzon	
Calapan	Mindoro	Verde Island Passage
Cavite	Luzon	Cañacao Bay
Coron	Busuanga	Coron Bay
Culion	Culion	
Currimao	Luzon	
Dagupan	Luzon	Lingayen Gulf
El Nido	Palawan	Bacuit Bay
Limay (Lamao Port)	Luzon	Manila Bay
Lubang (Tilik Port)	Lubang	Verde Island Passage
Manila	Luzon	Manila Bay
Mariveles	Luzon	Manila Bay
Masinloc	Luzon	
Orion (Capinpin Port)	Luzon	Manila Bay
San Fernando (Poro Point Port)	Luzon	Lingayen Gulf
San Jose	Mindoro	Mindoro Strait
Santo Tomas (Damortis Port)	Luzon	Lingayen Gulf
Sual	Luzon	Lingayen Gulf
Subic	Luzon	Subic Bay

Note: In September 2012, Philippine President Benigno Aquino III signed Administrative Order No. 29, mandating that all government agencies use the name "West Philippine Sea" to refer to the parts of the South China Sea within the Philippines' exclusive economic zone, and tasked the National Mapping and Resource Information Authority (NAMRIA) to use the name on official maps.

== Philippine Sea ==
The Philippine Sea is a marginal sea east and northeast of the Philippines. It is located in the western part of the North Pacific Ocean.

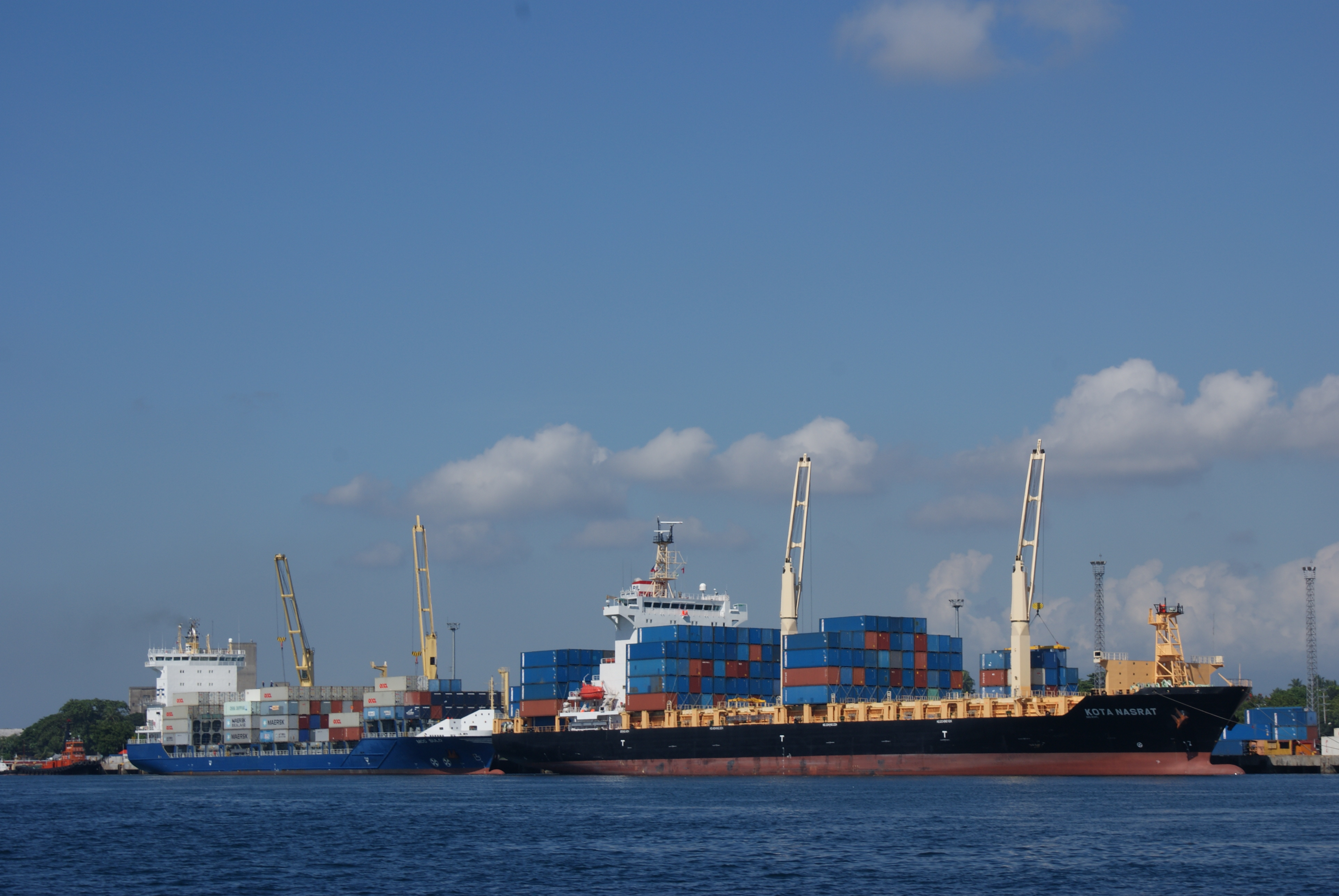
Port of Davao, Mindanao's main gateway

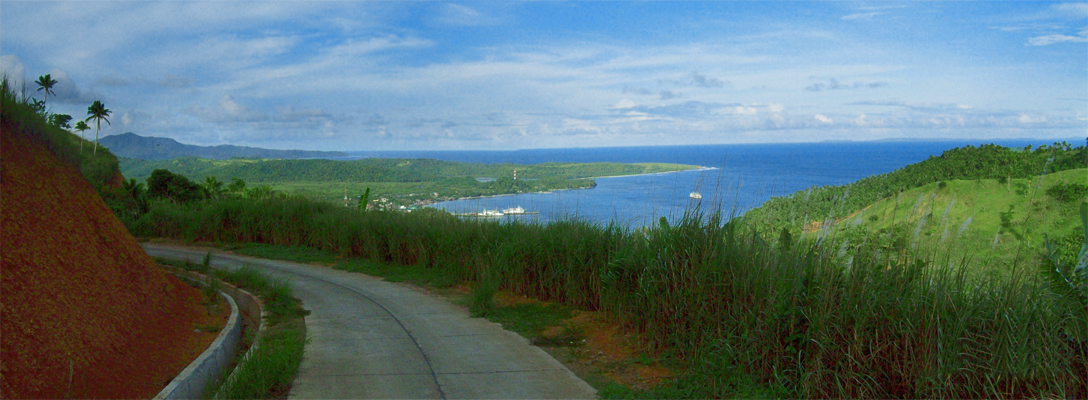
Port of Matnog, the busiest passenger ferry terminal on the AH-26

Port of	Island	Water body
Allen	Samar	San Bernardino Strait
Aparri	Luzon	Luzon Strait
Atimonan	Luzon	Lamon Bay
Basco	Batan	Luzon Strait
Bislig	Mindanao	Philippine Sea
Borongan	Samar	Philippine Sea
Casiguran	Luzon	Casiguran Sound
Dapa	Siargao	Philippine Sea
Jubang	Siargao	Philippine Sea
Davao (Sasa Wharf)	Mindanao	Davao Gulf
Dingalan	Luzon	Dingalan Bay
Guiuan	Samar	Philippine Sea
Infanta (Dinahican Port)	Luzon	Lamon Bay
Jose Panganiban	Luzon	Philippine Sea
Legazpi	Luzon	Albay Gulf
Mati	Mindanao	Pujada Bay
Matnog	Luzon	San Bernardino Strait
Palanan	Luzon	Philippine Sea
Piso Point (Piso Point Global Port)	Mindanao	Davao Gulf
Real (Puerto Real/Ungos Port)	Luzon	Lamon Bay
San Jose (Caraingan Port)	Samar	Philippine Sea
Santa Ana (Port Irene)	Luzon	Luzon Strait
Surigao (Verano & Lipata Ports)	Mindanao	Surigao Strait
Tabaco	Luzon	Lagonoy Gulf
Virac	Virac	Lagonoy Gulf

== Celebes Sea ==
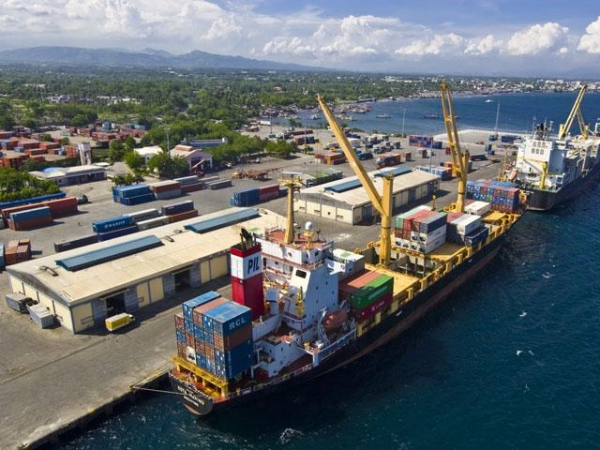
Port of General Santos, the southernmost port of the island of Mindanao

Port of	Island	Water body
Cotabato	Mindanao	Moro Gulf
General Santos (Makar Wharf)	Mindanao	Sarangani Bay
Isabela	Basilan	Basilan Strait
Kalamansig	Mindanao	
Pagadian	Mindanao	Illana Bay
Parang	Mindanao	Moro Gulf
Zamboanga	Mindanao	Basilan Strait

== Inland seas ==
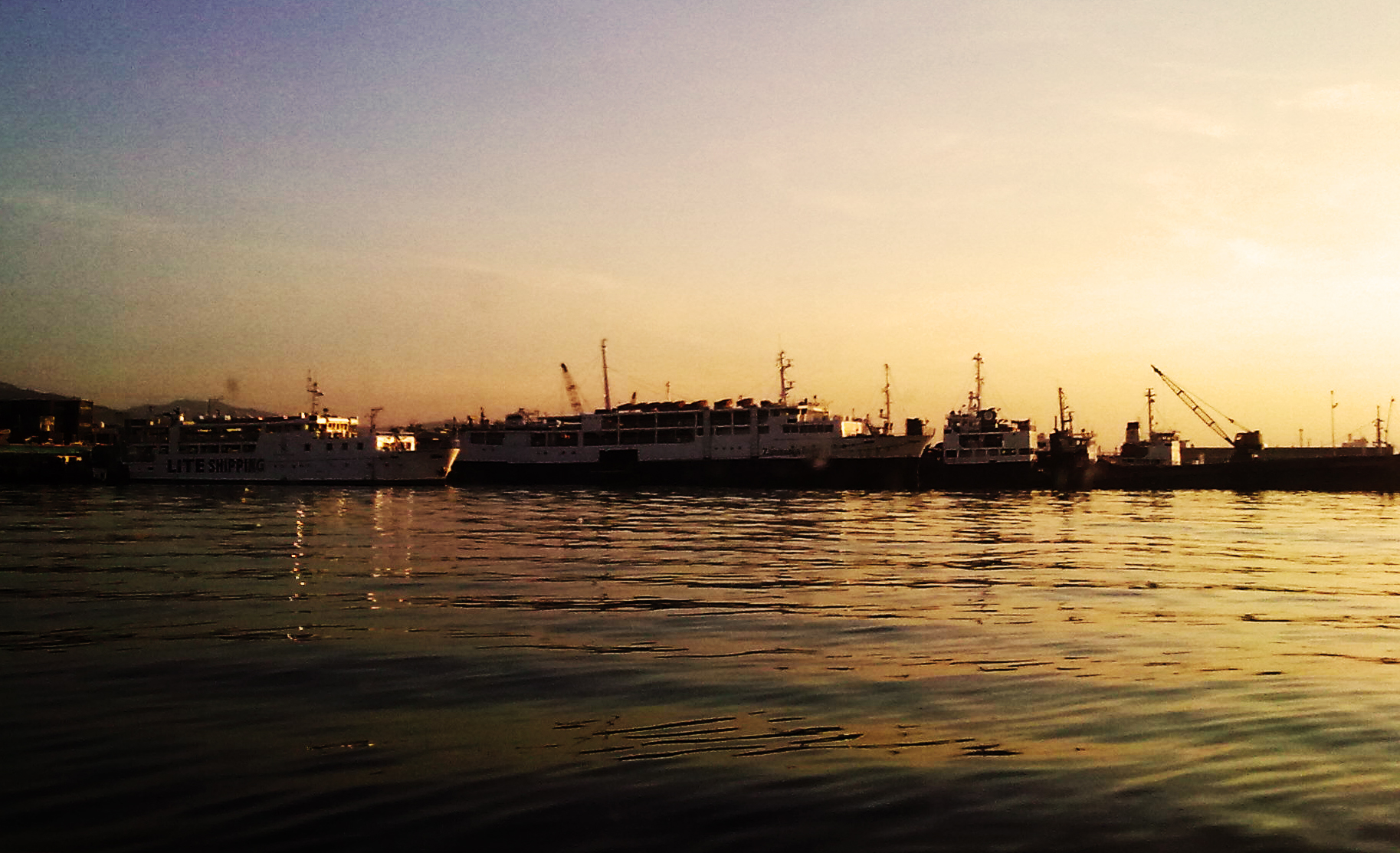
Port of Cebu, the busiest seaport in the Philippines in terms of annual passengers

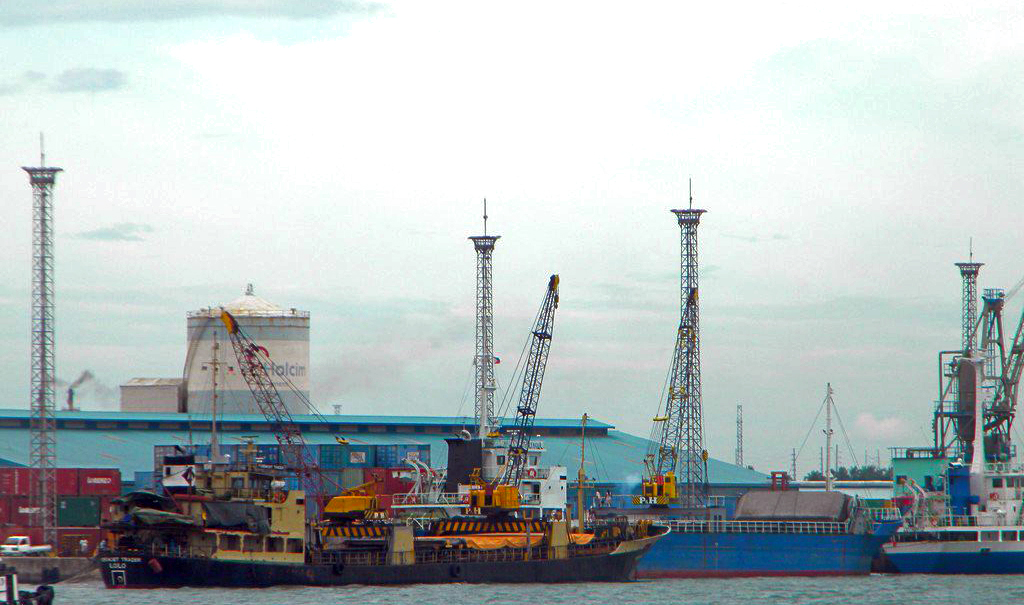
Port of Iloilo, third busiest port in the Philippines by number of ships

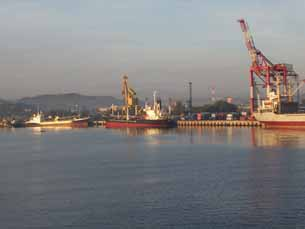
Port of Cagayan de Oro

Port of	Island	Water body
Amlan (Tandayag Port)	Negros	Tañon Strait
Argao	Cebu	Mindanao Sea
Balingoan	Mindanao	Mindanao Sea
Banate	Panay	Guimaras Strait
Banago	Negros	Guimaras Strait
Baybay	Leyte	Camotes Sea
Boac (Cawit Port)	Marinduque	Tayabas Bay
BREDCO	Negros	Guimaras Strait
Brooke's Point	Palawan	Sulu Sea
Bulan	Luzon	Ticao Pass
Butuan (Masao & River Ports)	Mindanao	Butuan Bay
Cagayan de Oro	Mindanao	Macajalar Bay
Calbayog	Samar	Samar Sea
Catbalogan	Samar	Samar Sea
Cebu	Cebu	Mactan Channel
Danao	Cebu	Camotes Sea
Dapitan (Pulauan Port)	Mindanao	Mindanao Sea
Dipolog (Galas Feeder Port)	Mindanao	Mindanao Sea
Dumaguete	Negros	Mindanao Sea
Dumangas	Panay	Mindanao Sea
Dumanjug	Cebu	Tañon Strait
Escalante	Negros	Visayan Sea
Estancia	Panay	Visayan Sea
Getafe	Bohol	Camotes Sea
Guihulngan	Negros	Tañon Strait
Hilongos	Leyte	Camotes Sea
Hinoba-an	Negros	Sulu Sea
Iligan	Mindanao	Iligan Bay
Iloilo	Panay	Iloilo Strait
Jagna	Bohol	Bohol Sea
Jimenez	Mindanao	Mindanao Sea
Larena	Siquijor	Mindanao Sea
Liloan	Leyte	Sogod Bay
Loon	Bohol	Mindanao Sea
Lucena	Luzon	Tayabas Bay
Maasin	Leyte	Mindanao Sea
Macabalan Wharf	Mindanao	Macajalar Bay
Magdiwang (Ambulong Port)	Sibuyan	Sibuyan Sea
Mahinog (Benoni Port)	Camiguin	Mindanao Sea
Malay (Caticlan Port)	Panay	Sulu Sea
Mandaue (Ouano Wharf)	Cebu	Mindanao Sea
Masbate	Masbate	Masbate Bay
Mukas, Kolambugan	Mindanao	Panguil Bay
Mogpog (Balanacan Port)	Marinduque	Tayabas Bay
Nasipit	Mindanao	Butuan Bay
New Washington (Dumaguit Port)	Panay	Sibuyan Sea
Odiongan (Poctoy Port)	Tablas	Tablas Strait
Opol	Mindanao	Macajalar Bay
Ormoc	Leyte	Camotes Sea
Ozamiz	Mindanao	Panguil Bay
Palompon	Leyte	Camotes Sea
Pasacao	Luzon	Ragay Gulf
Pio Duran	Luzon	Burias Pass
Plaridel	Mindanao	Mindanao Sea
Puerto Princesa	Palawan	Sulu Sea
Pulupandan	Negros	Guimaras Strait
Romblon	Romblon	Sibuyan Sea
Roxas (Culasi Port)	Panay	Visayan Sea
Roxas (Dangay Port)	Mindoro	Tablas Strait
Samboan (Bato Port)	Cebu	Tañon Strait
San Carlos	Negros	Tañon Strait
San Jose de Buenavista	Panay	Sulu Sea
San Isidro	Samar	Samar Sea
San Jose (Tampi Port)	Negros	Tañon Strait
Santa Cruz (Buyabod Port)	Marinduque	Tayabas Bay
San Remigio (Hagnaya Port)	Cebu	Tañon Strait
Santander (Liloan Port)	Cebu	Tañon Strait
Sibulan	Negros	Tañon Strait
Sorsogon	Luzon	Sorsogon Bay
Tabuelan	Cebu	Tañon Strait
Tacloban	Leyte	San Juanico Strait
Tagbilaran	Bohol	Bohol Sea
Talibon	Bohol	Camotes Sea
Tubigon	Bohol	Cebu Strait
Tubod	Mindanao	Panguil Bay
Ubay	Bohol	Camotes Sea
Tapal Wharf	Bohol	Camotes Sea

== See also ==
- Philippine Ports Authority
- Philippine Nautical Highway System
- Transportation in the Philippines
