= Port of Plaridel =

Port in Misamis Occidental, Philippines

Port of Plaridel Daungan ng Plaridel Pantalan sa Plaridel
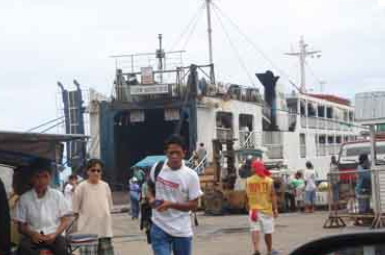
- Interactive map of Port of Plaridel; Daungan ng Plaridel; Pantalan sa Plaridel

Location
- Country: Philippines
- Location: Mindanao Sea, Mindanao island, the Philippines
- Coordinates: 8°36′26″N 123°43′32″E
- UN/LOCODE: PHPLA

Details
- Operated by: Philippine Ports Authority - Port Management Office Misamis Occidental/Ozamiz
- Owned by: Republic of the Philippines
- Type of Harbor: Natural/artificial

Statistics
- Website: ppapmoozamiz.com; www.ppa.gov.ph

The Port of Plaridel, or Plaridel Port (Filipino: Daungan ng Plaridel, Cebuano: Pantalan sa Plaridel), is a seaport in Plaridel, Misamis Occidental, Philippines. It is managed by Philippine Ports Authority - Port Management Office Misamis Occidental/Ozamiz.

== Passenger lines ==
- Cebu City - Lite Ferries
- Tagbilaran, Bohol - Lite Ferries, OceanJet
- Larena, Siquijor - Lite Ferries

== Statistics ==
=== Passenger movements ===
Year	Passengers embarked	Passengers disembarked	Total	Percent increased (-decreased)
2016	56,206	63,280	119,486	-
2017	60,003	59,011	119,014	-0.39▼
2018	61,316	64,980	126,296	6.12
2019	80,035	83,993	164,028	29.88
2020	13,847	15,045	28,892	82.39▼

=== Cargo throughput ===
Year	Domestic inward	Domestic outward	Domestic total	Import	Export	Foreign total	Grand total	Percent increased (-decreased)
2016	10,493	46,048	56,541	0	0	0	56,541	-
2017	17,022	23,428	40,450	0	0	0	40,450	-28.46▼
2018	30,432	19,111	49,543	0	0	0	49,543	22.48
2019	30,470	26,548	57,018	0	0	0	57,018	15.09

=== Shipcalls ===
Year	Domestic	Domestic percent increased (-decreased)	Foreign	Foreign percent increased (-decreased)	Grand total	Percent increased (-decreased)
2016	185		0		185	-
2017	181	-	0	-	181	-2.16▼
2018	187		0		187	3.31
2019	478		0		478	155.61
