= Mindanao Sea =

Mindanao Sea may refer to:

- another name for the Bohol Sea
- the Philippines portion of the Celebes Sea before its boundary with Indonesia known as the Philippines-Indonesia Exclusive Economic Zone (EEZ) Delimitation
