= Port of Oroquieta =

Port in Misamis Occidental, Philippines

The Port of Oroquieta (Filipino: Daungan ng Oroquieta, Cebuano: Pantalan sa Oroquieta) is a seaport in Oroquieta City, Misamis Occidental, Philippines. It is also known as Manuel L. Quezon Port and San Vicente Bajo Port. It is managed by Philippine Ports Authority - Port Management Office Misamis Occidental/Ozamiz. In September 2017, Roble Shipping made Oroquieta as its first port of call in Mindanao.

== Shipping firms and destinations ==
- Roble Shipping - Cebu City
