= Port of Dumaguete =

Port in the Philippines

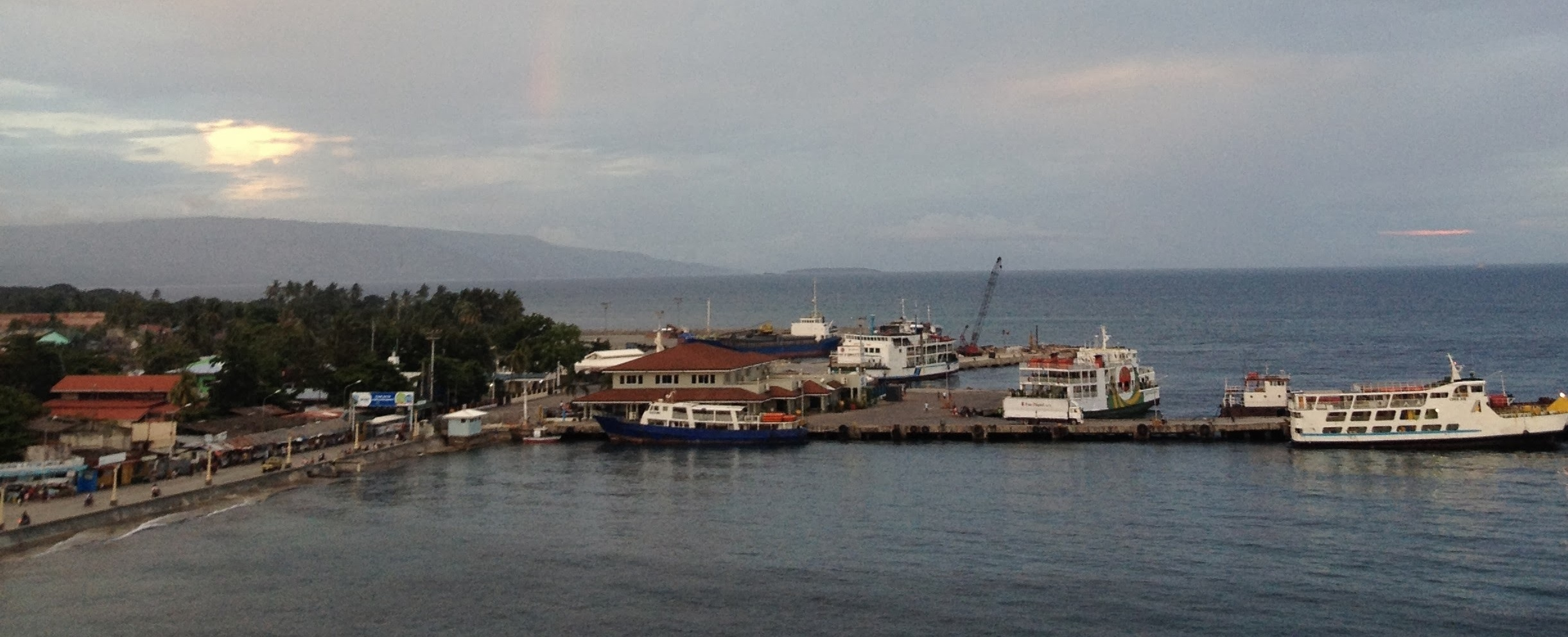
- Interactive map of Port of Dumaguete
- Location in Visayas#Philippines Port of Dumaguete (Philippines)

Location
- Country: Philippines
- Location: Dumaguete, Negros Oriental, Philippines
- Coordinates: 9°18′45″N 123°18′38″E
- UN/LOCODE: PHDGT

Details
- Operated by: Port Management Office Negros Oriental/Siquijor
- Owned by: Philippine Ports Authority
- Type of harbour: Natural/artificial

Statistics
- Passenger traffic: 1,526,308 (2023)
- Website www.ppa.com.ph

The Port of Dumaguete (Filipino: Daungan ng Dumaguete, Cebuano: Pantalan sa Dumaguete) is a seaport in Dumaguete, Negros Oriental, Philippines. It is owned and managed by the Philippine Ports Authority and is the base port of the Port Management Office of Negros Oriental/Siquijor.

After upgrade works were made in the port, the port was inaugurated on March 11, 2021 by President Rodrigo Duterte and Transportation Secretary Arthur Tugade.

== Shipping firms and destinations ==
- Cokaliong Shipping Lines - Cebu City and Dapitan
- FastCat - Dapitan
- Montenegro Lines - Siquijor, Siquijor and Dapitan
- Aleson Shipping Lines - Dipolog and Siquijor, Siquijor
- Lite Ferries - Oslob, Cebu and Dipolog/Dapitan
- 2GO Travel - Manila, Dipolog, and Zamboanga City
- OceanJet - Cebu City, Tagbilaran, and Siquijor, Siquijor
- HS Star Marine Shipping Corporation (MV Anika Star/MV StarCrafts 6) - Siquijor, Siquijor
- Evaristo & Sons Sea Transport - Dapitan
- Supershuttle Ferry - Larena, Siquijor and Oslob, Cebu

== Statistics ==
Passenger statistics
Year	Total	Disembarked	Embarked	Ref.
2015	1,307,493	716,029	591,464	
2016	1,559,035	881,990	677,045	
2017	1,604,443	887,312	717,131	
2018	1,865,687	1,070,977	794,710	
2019	2,185,898	1,244,363	941,535	
2020	433,304	231,637	201,667	
2021	193,789	101,253	92,536	
2022	1,143,819	629,650	514,159	
2023	1,526,308	850,136	676,172	

== See also ==
- List of ports in the Philippines
- Dumaguete
