= Port Management Office Misamis Occidental/Ozamiz =

Agency overview
- Formed: 1995; 31 years ago
- Headquarters: Port Area, Baybay Triunfo, Ozamiz City 7200, Philippines
- Agency executive: Engr. Salvador Delina, Port Manager
- Parent agency: Philippine Ports Authority
- Website: ppapmoozamiz.com www.ppa.com.ph

Port Management Office Misamis Occidental/Ozamiz is one of the port management offices of the Philippine Ports Authority which oversees all government and private ports in the Province of Misamis Occidental, with the code MOZ.

== History ==
In 1995 TMO Ozamiz was upgraded to Port Management Office as PMO Ozamiz, separated from PMO Iligan, having the jurisdiction over Misamis Occidental and Dipolog City. In 2008, TMO Dapitan became PMO Zamboanga del Norte.

== List of ports Under PPA-PMO Misamis Occidental/Ozamiz ==
=== Government ports ===
- Port of Ozamiz, Ozamiz City, Misamis Occidental (base port) - the headquarters of PMO Misamis Occidental/Ozamiz (MOZ)
- Port of Jimenez, Jimenez, Misamis Occidental - serving the Jimenez oil depots of Petron, Shell and Chevron
- Port of Plaridel, Plaridel, Misamis Occidental - the gateway port of Northwestern Mindanao to Bohol and Siquijor
- Silanga Port, Tangub City, Misamis Occidental
- Port of Oroquieta, Oroquieta City, Misamis Occidental

=== Private ports ===
- Third Millennium Oil Mill, Jimenez, Misamis Occidental

== Statistics ==
=== 2023 ===
Passenger movements

Port	Passengers disembarked	Passengers embarked	Cruise ships	Total
BP Ozamiz	859,580	919,537	0	1,779,144
TMO Jimenez	0	0	0	0
TMO Plaridel	55,806	57,094	0	112,900
Other government ports	0	0	0	0
Other private ports	0	0	0	0
Grand total	915,386	976,628	0	1,892,014

=== Passenger movements ===
Year	Passengers embarked	Passengers disembarked	Total	Percent increased (-decreased)
2016	1,632,528	1,751,261	3,383,789	
2017	1,930,453	1,924,523	3,854,976	13.92
2018	1,762,937	1,811,090	3,574,027	(-7.29)▼
2019	1,992,426	1,676,407	3,668,833	2.65
2020	514,166	433,577	947,743	(-74.17)▼
2021	372,609	365,759	738,368	(-22.09)▼
2022	961,382	958,159	1,919,541	159.97
2023	976,628	915,386	1,892,014	(-1.43)▼

=== Container traffic ===
Year	Domestic inward	Domestic outward	Domestic total	Import	Export	Foreign total	Grand total	Percent increased (-decreased)
2016	18,718	19,202	37,920	0	0	0	37,920	
2017	19,450	19,722	39,172	0	0	0	39,172	3.30
2018	22,054	21,940	43,994	0	0	0	43,994	12.31
2019	23,658	23,709	47,367	0	0	0	47,367	7.67
2020	20,481	20,040	40,521	0	0	0	40,521	(-14.45)▼
2021	20,663	20,541	41,204	0	0	0	41,204	1.69
2022	22,641	22,052	44,693	0	0	0	44,693	8.47
2023	18,630	18,345	36,975	0	0	0	36,975	(-17.27)▼

=== Cargo throughput ===
Year	Domestic inward	Domestic outward	Domestic total	Import	Export	Foreign total	Grand total	Percent increased (-decreased)
2016	833,905	432,676	1,266,581	44,250	102,559	146,809	1,266,582	
2017	889,151	311,866	1,201,017	54,477	158,900	213,377	1,414,394	11.67
2018	1,037,910	263,050	1,300,960	33,429	171,145	204,573	1,505,533	6.44
2019	894392	292,086	1,191,478	45,968	101,160	147128	1,338,606	(-11.09)▼
2020	756,583	238,631	995,215	41,088	111,570	152,658	1,147,873	(-14.25)▼
2021	694,677	204,850	899,527	33,041	160,824	193,864	1,093,391	(-4.75)▼
2022	706,294	181,488	887,782	33,736	154,262	187,999	1,075,781	(-1.61)▼
2023	640,973	195,841	836,814	21,923	113,198	135,122	971,935	(-9.65)▼

=== Shipcalls ===
Year	Domestic	Domestic percent increased (-decreased)	Foreign	Foreign percent increased (-decreased)	Grand total	Percent increased (-decreased)
2016	15,800		71		15,871	
2017	16,184	2.43	55	(-22.54)▼	16,239	2.31
2018	17,794	9.95	51	(-7.27)▼	17,332	6.73
2019	17,916	0.69	40	(-21.57)▼	17,956	3.60
2020	10,129	(-43.46)▼	31	(-22.50)▼	10,160	(-43.42)▼
2021	12,844	26.80	40	29.03	12,884	26.81
2022	12,544	(-2.34)▼	44	10	12,588	(-2.30)▼
2023	11,446	(-8.75)▼	37	(-15.90)▼	11,483	(-8.78)▼
