= Port of Jimenez =

Port in Misamis Occidental, Philippines

Coordinates: 8°19′57″N 123°51′28″E

The Port of Jimenez or Jimenez Port (Filipino: Daungan ng Jimenez, Cebuano: Pantalan sa Jimenez), is a seaport in Jimenez, Misamis Occidental, Philippines. It is managed by Philippine Ports Authority - Port Management Office Misamis Occidental/Ozamiz.
