= Port of Abra de Ilog =

Port in Occidental Mindoro, Philippines

Port of Abra de Ilog Pantalan ng Abra de Ilog
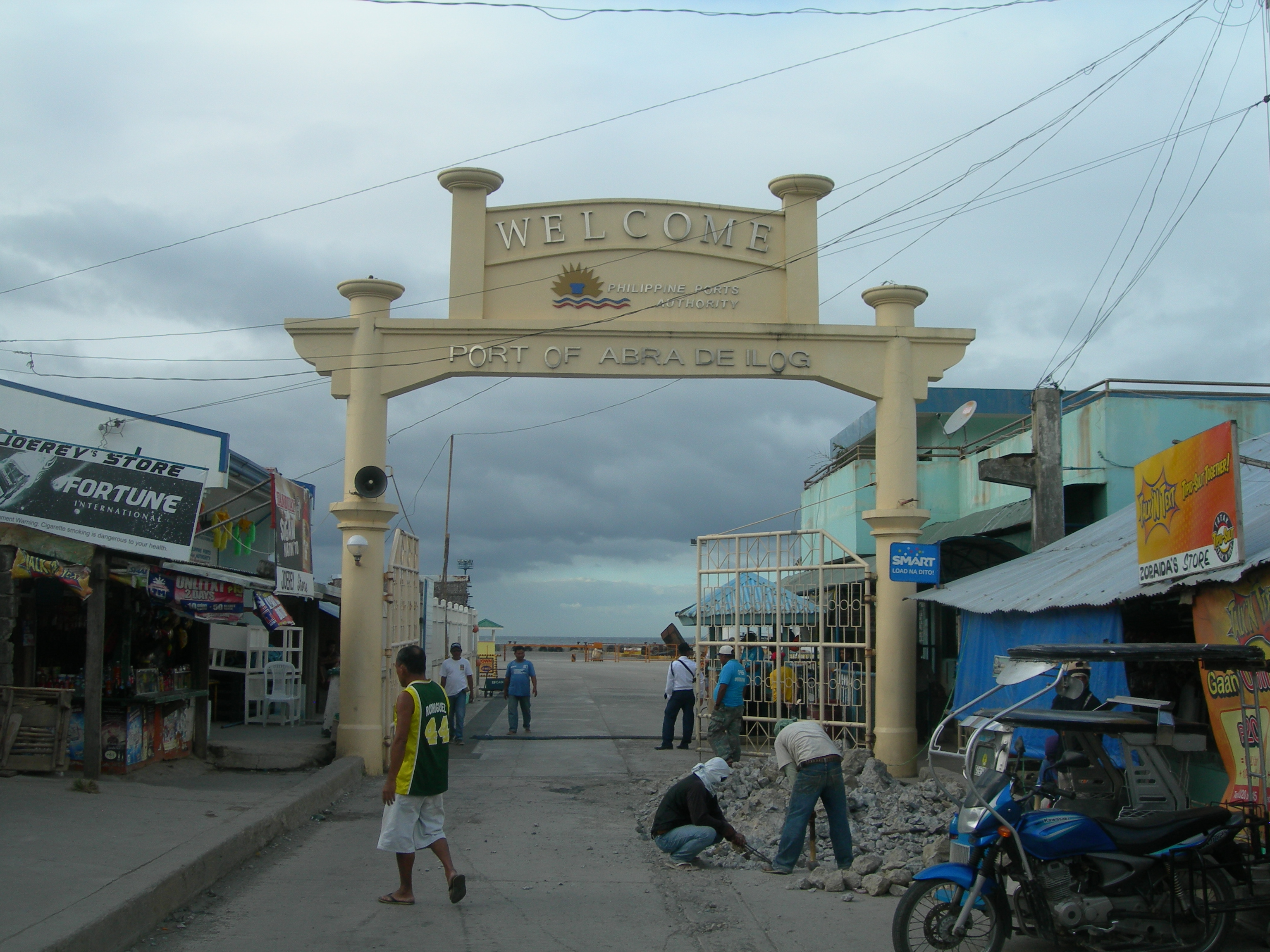
- Entrance to the ferry terminal of the Port of Abra de Ilog, 2012
- Interactive map of Port of Abra de Ilog; Pantalan ng Abra de Ilog

Location
- Country: Philippines
- Location: Abra de Ilog, Occidental Mindoro
- Coordinates: 13°28′02″N 120°46′21″E

Details
- Operated by: Philippine Ports Authority
- Owned by: Government of Abra de Ilog
- Type of harbour: Roro port
- Size: 4,707.62 square metres (0.00181762 sq mi)
- No. of berths: 4
- No. of piers: 2

Port of Abra de Ilog in 2026

The Port of Abra de Ilog (Filipino: Pantalan ng Abra de Ilog) is a seaport in Abra de Ilog, Occidental Mindoro in the Philippines. It is the main seaport of northern Occidental Mindoro. Household consumption goods are the main cargoes imported in the port while outgoing cargoes are agricultural products such as corn, rice, and livestock. The port has a Passenger Terminal Building which occupies 159 square meters (1,710 sq ft) of space and can accommodate up to 100 people. The port has an two 81 meters (266 ft) RC pier with four ramps for RORO ferries. As of 2023, Montenegro Shipping Lines, Island Water and Besta Shipping Lines (orange navigation) have destinations from Abra de Ilog to Batangas, while Caribbean lines (pump boat) has a destination to Balatero (Puerto Galera).
