= Abra de Ilog =

Municipality in Occidental Mindoro, Philippines

- Municipality
- Municipality of Abra de Ilog
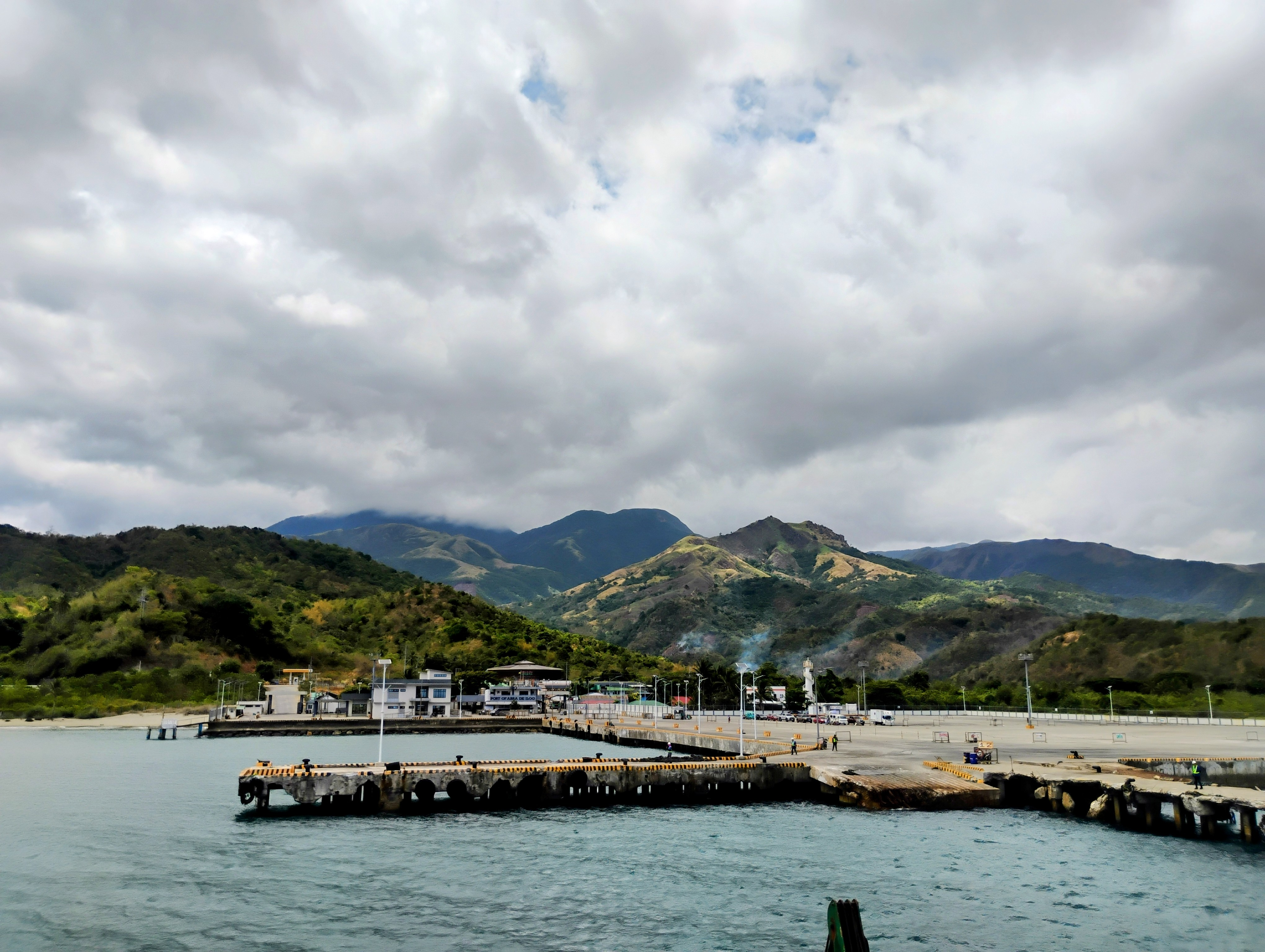
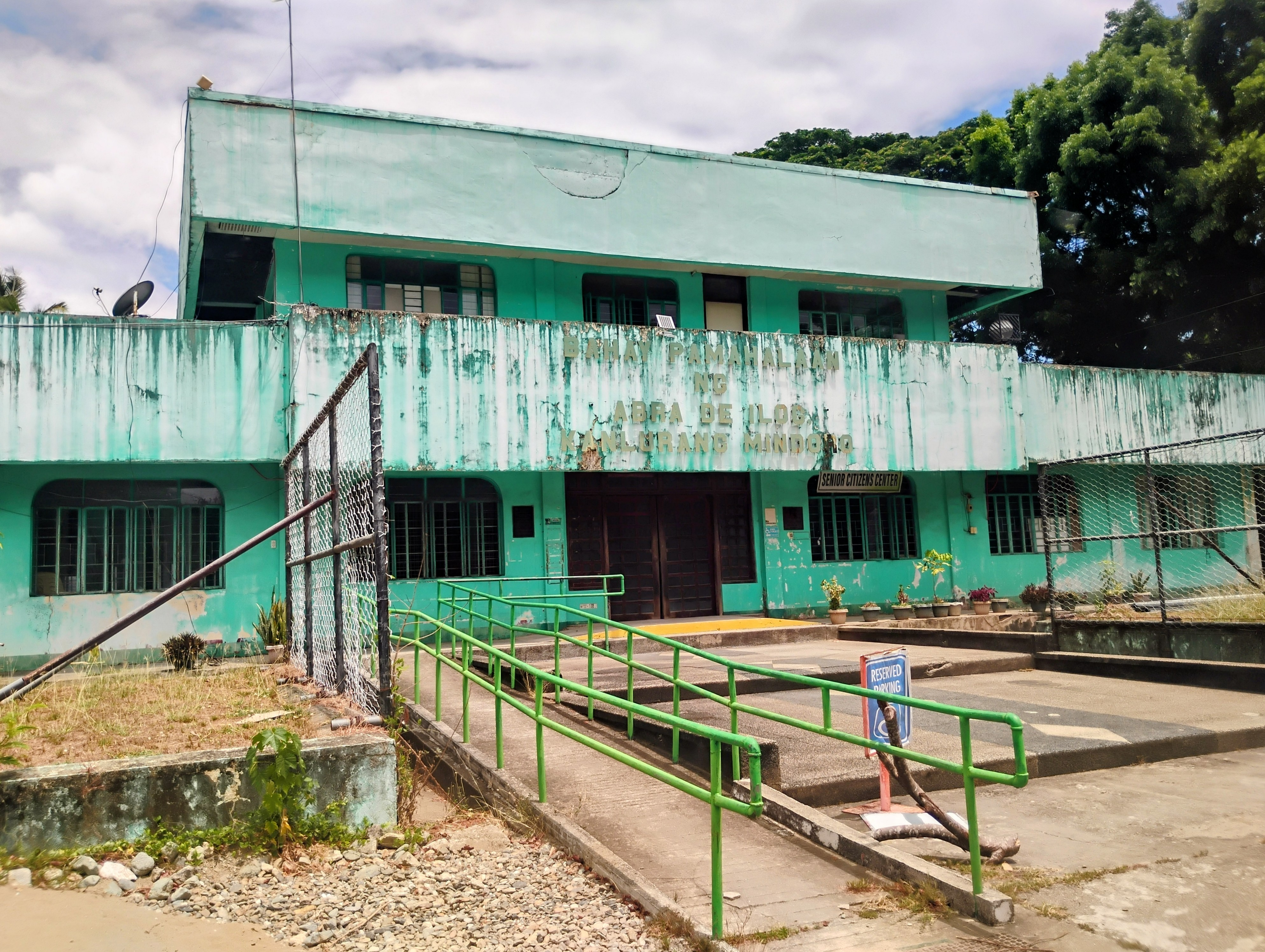
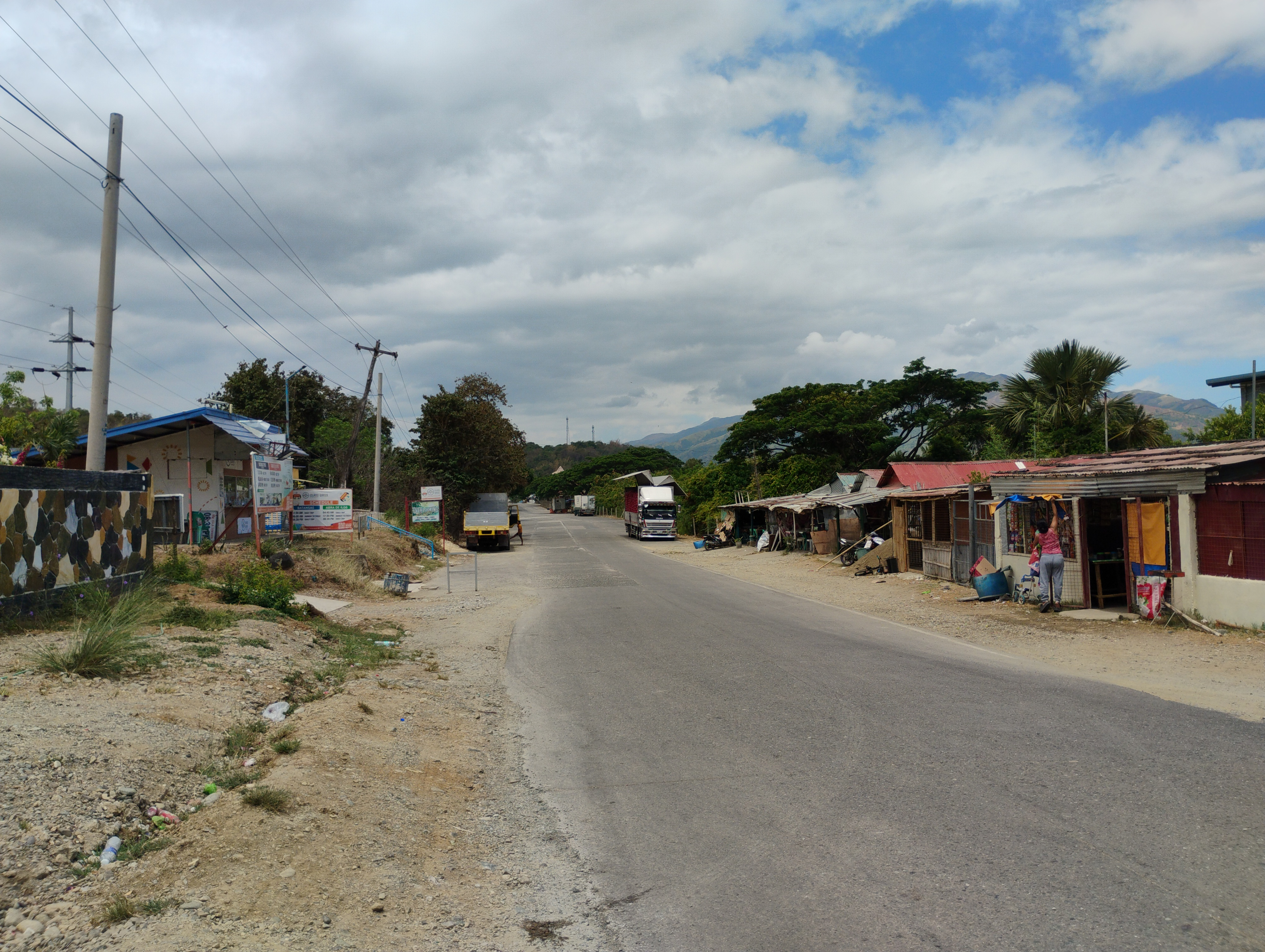
- Port of Abra de Ilog Abra de Ilog Municipal Hall Mindoro Island Circumferential Road in Abra de Ilog

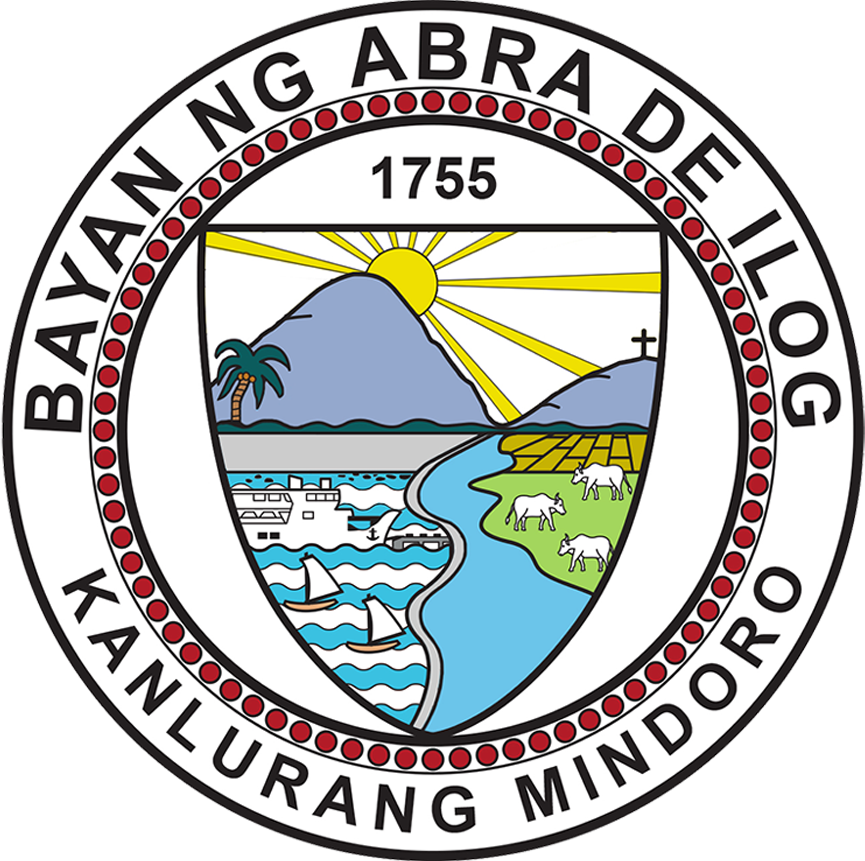
- Seal
- Nickname: The Iraya Heartland
- Interactive map of Abra de Ilog
- Location within the Philippines
- Coordinates: 13°26′41″N 120°43′34″E
- Country: Philippines
- Region: Mimaropa
- Province: Occidental Mindoro
- District: Lone district
- Founded: 1902
- Annexation to Mamburao: January 4, 1905
- Reestablished: 1910
- Barangays: 10 (see Barangays)

Government
  - Type: Sangguniang Bayan
  - Mayor: Meg Constantino
  - Vice Mayor: Patria Unika Polinag Almajo
  - Representative: Leody Tarriela
  - Municipal Council: Members: Maybelle V. Ramos; Jasper Brian B. Subol; Romeo L. Bacay; Arleen A. Montenegro; Romulo A. Gutierrez Jr.; Diomedes I. Zoleta Jr.; Reynaldo T. Belen; Patria Unika P. Almajo
  - Electorate: 20,914 voters (2025)

Area
  - Total: 533.70 km^{2} (206.06 sq mi)
- Elevation: 330 m (1,080 ft)
- Highest elevation: 1,771 m (5,810 ft)
- Lowest elevation: 0 m (0 ft)

Population (2024 census)
  - Total: 31,910
  - Density: 59.79/km^{2} (154.9/sq mi)
  - Households: 8,334

Economy
  - Income class: 1st municipal income class
  - Poverty incidence: 37.84% (2023)
  - Revenue: ₱ 287 million (2024)
  - Assets: ₱ 670.3 million (2024)
  - Expenditure: ₱ 282.1 million (2024)
  - Liabilities: ₱ 77.43 million (2024)

Service provider
  - Electricity: Occidental Mindoro Electric Cooperative (OMECO)
- Time zone: UTC+8 (PST)
- ZIP code: 5108
- PSGC: 1705101000
- IDD : area code: +63 (0)43
- Native languages: Iraya; Tagalog

Abra de Ilog, officially the Municipality of Abra de Ilog (Tagalog: Bayan ng Abra de Ilog), is a municipality in the province of Occidental Mindoro , Philippines. According to the 2024 census, it has a population of 31,910 people.

== History ==
Abra de Ilog was formerly a small settlement founded by Spanish religious missionaries sometime in the early part of the 17th century. According to folk history, its former name was Abre de Ilog. The name was derived from the Spanish verb abrir (to open) and the Tagalog noun ilog (river). Later on, the name evolved into its present name: Abra de Ilog, a Chabacano-like terminology which can be loosely translated as bucana ng ilog, or "opening of the river." This can be attributed to the numerous rivers and creeks that traverses strategic areas of the municipality.

In 1902, during the American Occupation the town was officially organized. Abra de Ilog's first "municipal president" was Rosaleo Miciano. But with the passage of Republic Act No. 1280 on January 4, 1905, Abra de Ilog was made a barrio of the municipality of Mamburao.

In 1910, Abra de Ilog regained its status as a municipality. On June 13, 1950, the government approved Republic Act No. 505 dividing Mindoro into two new provinces: Oriental Mindoro and Occidental Mindoro. Abra de Ilog was included as part of Occidental Mindoro.

== Geography ==
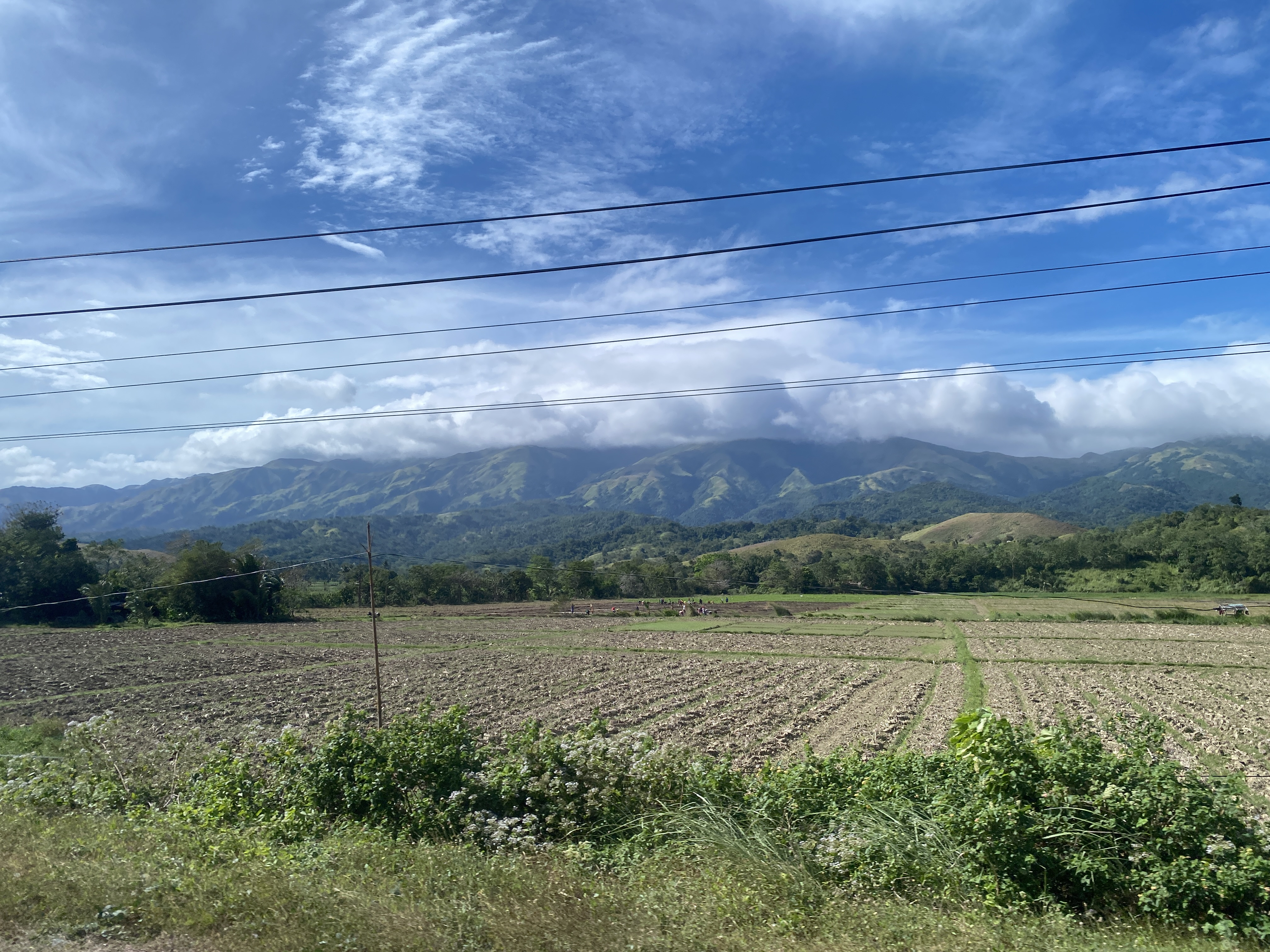
Fields of Abra de Ilog.

Abra de Ilog is classified as partially urban. It is 32 kilometers (20 mi) from Mamburao.

=== Barangays ===
Abra de Ilog is politically subdivided into 10 barangays. Each barangay consists of puroks and some have sitios.

The newest barangay, Santa Maria was created in 2014 from Wawa.

- Armado (San Julian)
- Balao (San Felife)
- Cabacao (Santissima Trinidad)
- Lumangbayan (Kabayan)
- Poblacion
- San Vicente
- Santa Maria
- Tibag (Saint Amber)
- Udalo (Camurong)
- Wawa (San Benito)

=== Climate ===
Climate data for Abra de Ilog, Occidental Mindoro
Month	Jan	Feb	Mar	Apr	May	Jun	Jul	Aug	Sep	Oct	Nov	Dec	Year
Mean daily maximum °C (°F)	28 (82)	29 (84)	30 (86)	31 (88)	31 (88)	30 (86)	29 (84)	29 (84)	29 (84)	29 (84)	29 (84)	28 (82)	29 (85)
Mean daily minimum °C (°F)	22 (72)	21 (70)	22 (72)	23 (73)	25 (77)	25 (77)	25 (77)	25 (77)	25 (77)	24 (75)	23 (73)	22 (72)	24 (74)
Average precipitation mm (inches)	48 (1.9)	32 (1.3)	41 (1.6)	54 (2.1)	257 (10.1)	410 (16.1)	466 (18.3)	422 (16.6)	429 (16.9)	300 (11.8)	137 (5.4)	92 (3.6)	2,688 (105.7)
Average rainy days	10.8	8.0	9.8	11.7	23.1	27.5	29.2	28.7	28.7	25.5	18.2	12.8	234
Source: Meteoblue

== Demographics ==
Population census of Abra de Ilog
Year	Pop.	±% p.a.
1903	872	—
1918	2,117	+6.09%
1939	3,986	+3.06%
1948	4,504	+1.37%
1960	5,346	+1.44%
1970	7,356	+3.24%
1975	10,810	+8.03%
1980	12,917	+3.62%
1990	13,609	+0.52%
1995	15,253	+2.16%
2000	22,212	+8.39%
2007	25,152	+1.73%
2010	29,225	+5.61%
2015	31,306	+1.32%
2020	35,176	+2.48%
2024	31,910	−2.31%
Source: Philippine Statistics Authority

== Economy ==
Poverty incidence of Abra de Ilog (%)

Source: Philippine Statistics Authority

== Education ==
The Abra de Ilog-Paluan Schools District Office governs all educational institutions within the municipality. It oversees the management and operations of all private and public, from primary to secondary schools.

=== Primary and elementary schools ===
- Abra de Ilog Central School
- Almeda Adventist Elementary School
- Aluyan Primary School
- Armado Elementary School
- Bagolayag Min. Elementary School
- Balao Elementary School
- Biga Memorial School
- Cabacao Elementary School
- Cabacao Elementary School (Balantoy Annex)
- Camurong Elementary School
- Hebron Minority School
- Kadilawan Elementary School
- Kulanguan Prrmary School
- Lago Minority School
- Lucutan Elementary School
- Lumangbayan Elementary School (Abra)
- Matabang Elementary School
- Matabang-Urilan Minority School
- Pambuhan Minority School
- Pandanan Minority School
- Rayusan Minority School
- San Rafael High School
- San Vicente Elementary School
- Sto. Tomas Min. Elementary School
- Tibag Elementary School
- Treasures from the Lord Development Center
- Udalo Elementary School
- Wawa Elementary School

=== Secondary schools ===
- Abra de Ilog National High School
- Abra de Ilog National High School (Biga Extension)
- Abra de Ilog National High School (Camurong Annex)
- Cabacao National High School
- Pambuhan Indigenous People Village High School

=== Higher educational institution ===
- University of Perpetual Help Mindoro Mission School
