= Port of Ozamiz =

Port in the Philippines

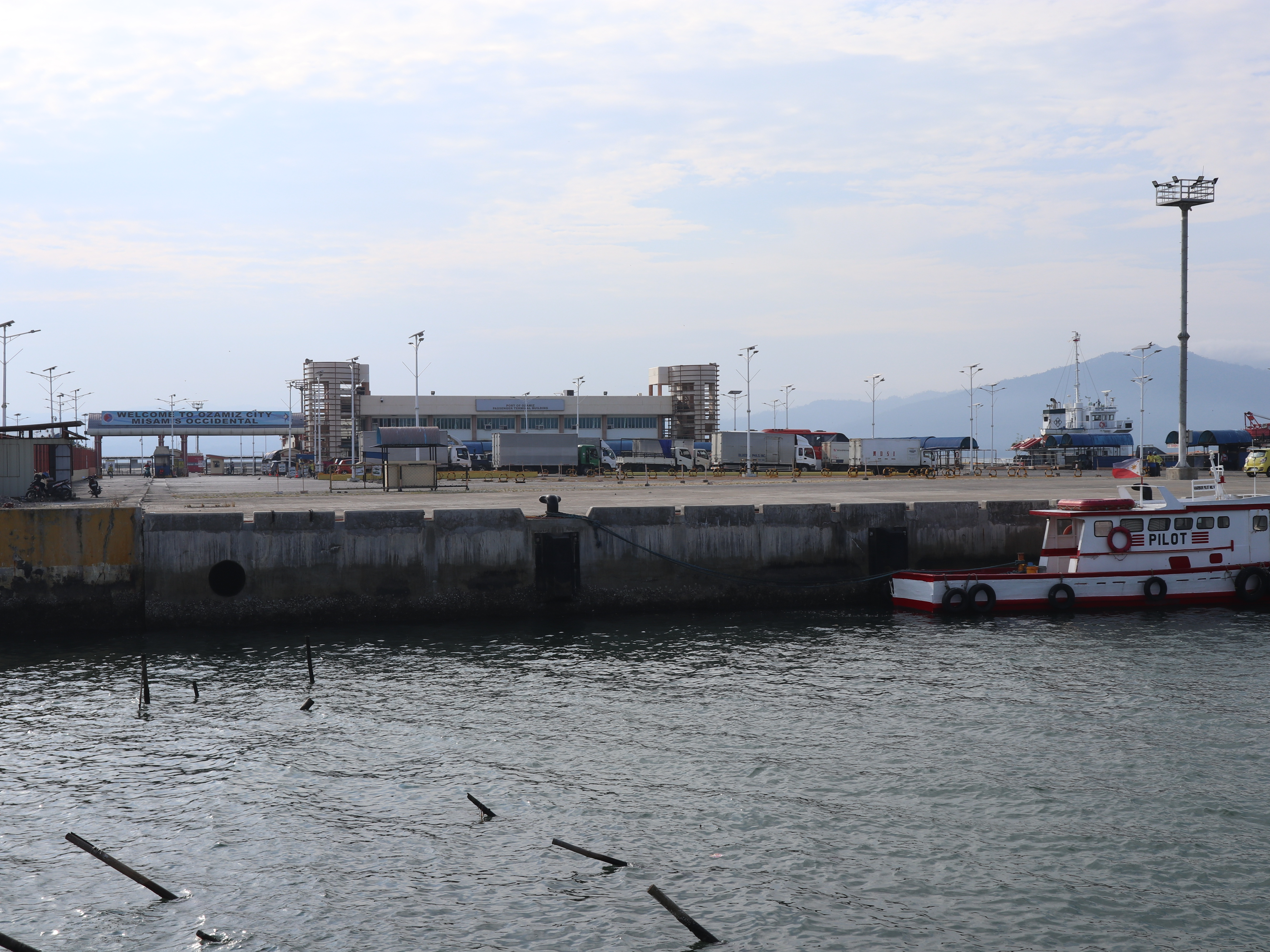
- Interactive map of Port of Ozamiz
- Location within Philippines

Location
- Country: Philippines
- Location: Panguil Bay, Mindanao island, the Philippines
- Coordinates: 8.139°N 123.846°E
- UN/LOCODE: PHOZC

Details
- Opened: 1700s
- Operated by: Philippine Ports Authority
- Owned by: Republic of the Philippines
- Type of Harbor: Natural/artificial
- Land area: 21,274 m^{2} (228,990 sq ft)
- No. of wharfs: 2
- No. of piers: 2
- Draft depth: 9.5 m (31 ft)
- Other names: Daungan ng Ozamiz; Pantalan sa Ozamiz

Statistics
- Website ppapmoozamiz.com, www.ppa.gov.ph

The Port of Ozamiz (Filipino: Daungan ng Ozamiz, Cebuano: Pantalan sa Ozamiz) is a seaport in Ozamiz City, Misamis Occidental, Philippines. Located in Panguil Bay, it is one of the major gateway ports in the Philippines. It is managed by and the baseport of Philippine Ports Authority - Port Management Office Misamis Occidental/Ozamiz.

== History ==
On June 9, 1961, President Carlos P. Garcia established Ozamiz Port as a subport of entry of Cagayan de Oro City. On June 18, 1966, RA 4768 designated Ozamiz as a port of entry. On July 22, 1993, President Fidel V. Ramos placed the port under the administrative jurisdiction of the Philippine Ports Authority.

== Passenger lines ==
- Manila - 2GO Travel
- Cebu City - Cokaliong Shipping Lines, Trans-Asia Shipping Lines
- Iligan City - Cokaliong Shipping Lines, Trans-Asia Shipping Lines
- Lazi, Siquijor - Trans-Asia Shipping Lines

== Statistics ==
=== Passenger movements ===
Year	Passengers embarked	Passengers disembarked	Total	Percent increased (-decreased)
2015	1,594,140	1,710,138	3,304,278	
2016	1,576,322	1,687,981	3,264,303	▼1.21%
2017	1,863,756	1,860,374	3,724,130	14.09%
2018	1,700,011	1,743,681	3,443,692	▼7.53%
2019	1,912,391	1,592,414	3,504,805	1.77%
2020	500,319	418,532	918,851	▼73.78%
2021	367,372	359,729	727,101	▼20.87%
2022	905,605	906,219	1,811,824	149.18%
2023	919,534	859,580	1,779,114	▼1.81%

=== Container traffic ===
Year	Domestic inward	Domestic outward	Domestic total	Import	Export	Foreign total	Grand total	Percent increased (-decreased)
2015	16,019	16,491	32,510	0	0	0	32,510	-
2016	18,718	19,202	37,920	0	0	0	37,920	16.64%
2017	18,586	18,819	37,405	0	0	0	37,405	▼1.36%
2018	22,040	21,940	43,980	0	0	0	43,980	17.58%
2019	23,658	23,709	47,367	0	0	0	47,367	7.70%
2020	20,481	20,040	40,521	0	0	0	40,521	▼14.45%
2021	20,628	20,478	41,106	0	0	0	41,106	1.44%
2022	22,641	22,052	44,693	0	0	0	44,693	8.73%
2023	18,630	18,115	36,744	0	0	0	36,744	▼17.79%

=== Cargo throughput ===
Year	Domestic inward	Domestic outward	Domestic total	Import	Export	Foreign total	Grand total	Percent increased (-decreased)
2015	527,596	303,460	831,056	0	0	0	831,056	
2016	606,645	321,528	928,173	31,082	0	31,082	959,254	13.36%
2017	631,269	255,527	886,796	25,000	0	25,000	912,296	▼4.91
2018	783,274	217,041	1,000,288	17,608	0	17,608	1,017,896	11.57
2019	680,282	223,511	903,792	28,221	0	28,221	932,013	▼8.44
2020	577,341	162,760	740,101	25,604	0	25,604	765,705	▼17.84
2021	522,266	154,457	676,723	20,042	0	20,042	696,765	▼9
2022	459,583	154,172	613,755	15,755	0	15,755	629,510	▼9.65%
2023	405,232	145,207	550,442	15,048	0	15,048	565,490	▼10.17%

=== Shipcalls ===
Year	Domestic	Domestic percent increased (-decreased)	Foreign	Foreign percent increased (-decreased)	Grand total	Percent increased (-decreased)
2015	15,110		34		15,144	
2016	15,254	0.95%	48	41.18%	15,302	1.04%
2017	15,711	3%	20	▼58.33%	15,731	2.8%
2018	17,317	10.22%	15	▼25%	17,332	10.18%
2019	17,201	▼0.67%	14	▼6.67%	17,215	▼0.67%
2020	9,738	▼43.39%	4	▼71.43%	9,742	▼43.41%
2021	12,539	28.76%	3	▼25%	12,542	28.74%
2022	12,178	▼2.88%	3	0%	12,181	▼2.88%
2023	11,060	▼9.18%	3	0%	11,063	▼9.18%
