= Mukas Port =

Seaport in Lanao del Norte, Philippines

Mukas Port Daungan ng Mukas Pantalan sa Mukas
- Interactive map of Mukas Port; Daungan ng Mukas; Pantalan sa Mukas

Location
- Country: Philippines
- Location: Panguil Bay, Mindanao island, the Philippines
- Coordinates: 8°06′12″N 123°50′32″E

Details
- Opened: 1997
- Operated by: Daima Shipping Lines
- Owned by: Daima Shipping Lines
- Type of Harbor: Natural/artificial

The Mukas Port (Filipino: Daungan ng Mukas, Cebuano: Pantalan sa Mukas), is a seaport in Kolambugan, Lanao del Norte, Philippines. It is owned and managed by Daima Shipping Corporation.

== Passenger lines ==
- Ozamiz - Daima
