= Bohol Sea =

Marginal sea between the Visayas and Mindanao in the Philippines

- Mindanao Sea
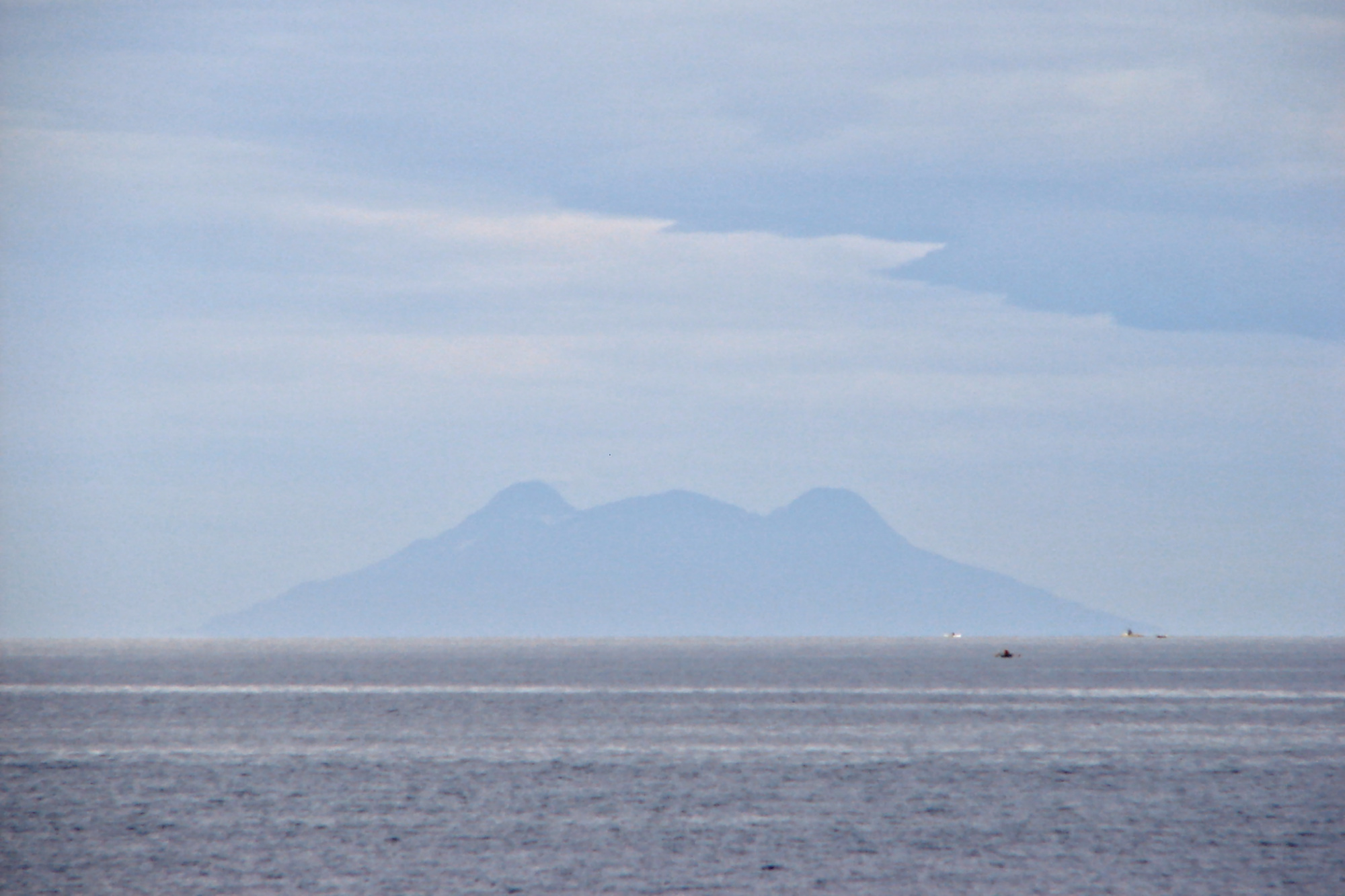
- The sea with Camiguin island in the distance

- Location within the Philippines
- Location: Central Visayas; Northern Mindanao; Negros Island Region; Caraga; Eastern Visayas; Zamboanga Peninsula
- Coordinates: 9°12′N 124°30′E
- Type: Sea
- Etymology: Bohol / Mindanao
- Basin countries: Philippines

The Bohol Sea, also called the Mindanao Sea, is a sea located between the Visayas and Mindanao islands in the Philippines. It lies south of Bohol and Leyte and north of Mindanao. Siquijor and Camiguin are its two major islands.

The major cities along the coastline of the sea are Cagayan de Oro, Iligan, Butuan, Dumaguete, Ozamiz and Tagbilaran.

The sea connects to the Philippine Sea through the Surigao Strait, to the Camotes Sea both through the Canigao Channel and Cebu Strait, and to the Sulu Sea through the strait between Negros Island and Zamboanga Peninsula.

== Marine life ==
Marine life is abundant and includes clownfish, lionfish, barracuda, dolphins and large coral formations. Rorquals, including blue whales, have returned to the Bohol Sea, which is a rare trend in any Asian waters.

== Gallery ==
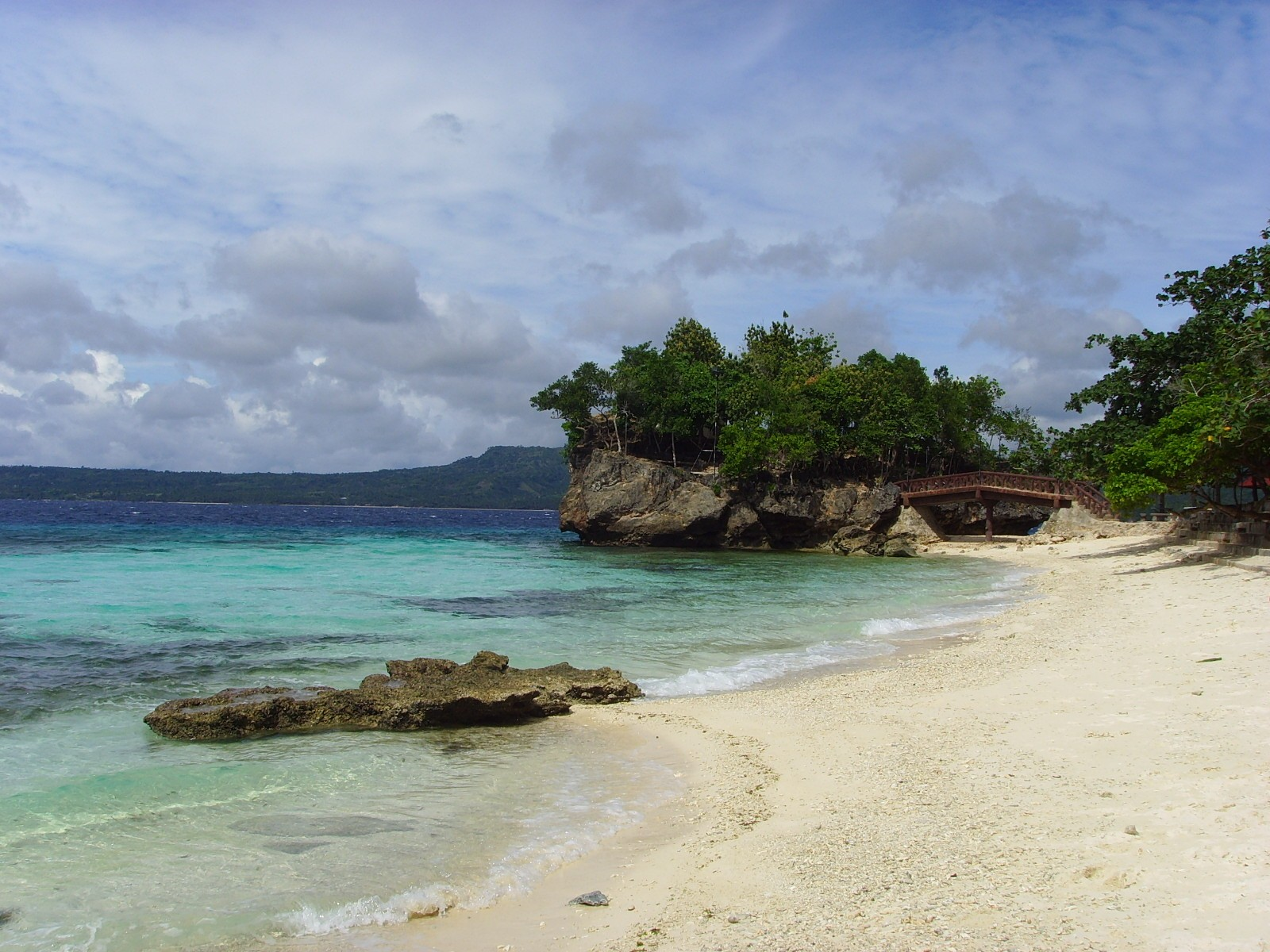
Salagdoong Beach facing the sea in Siquijor

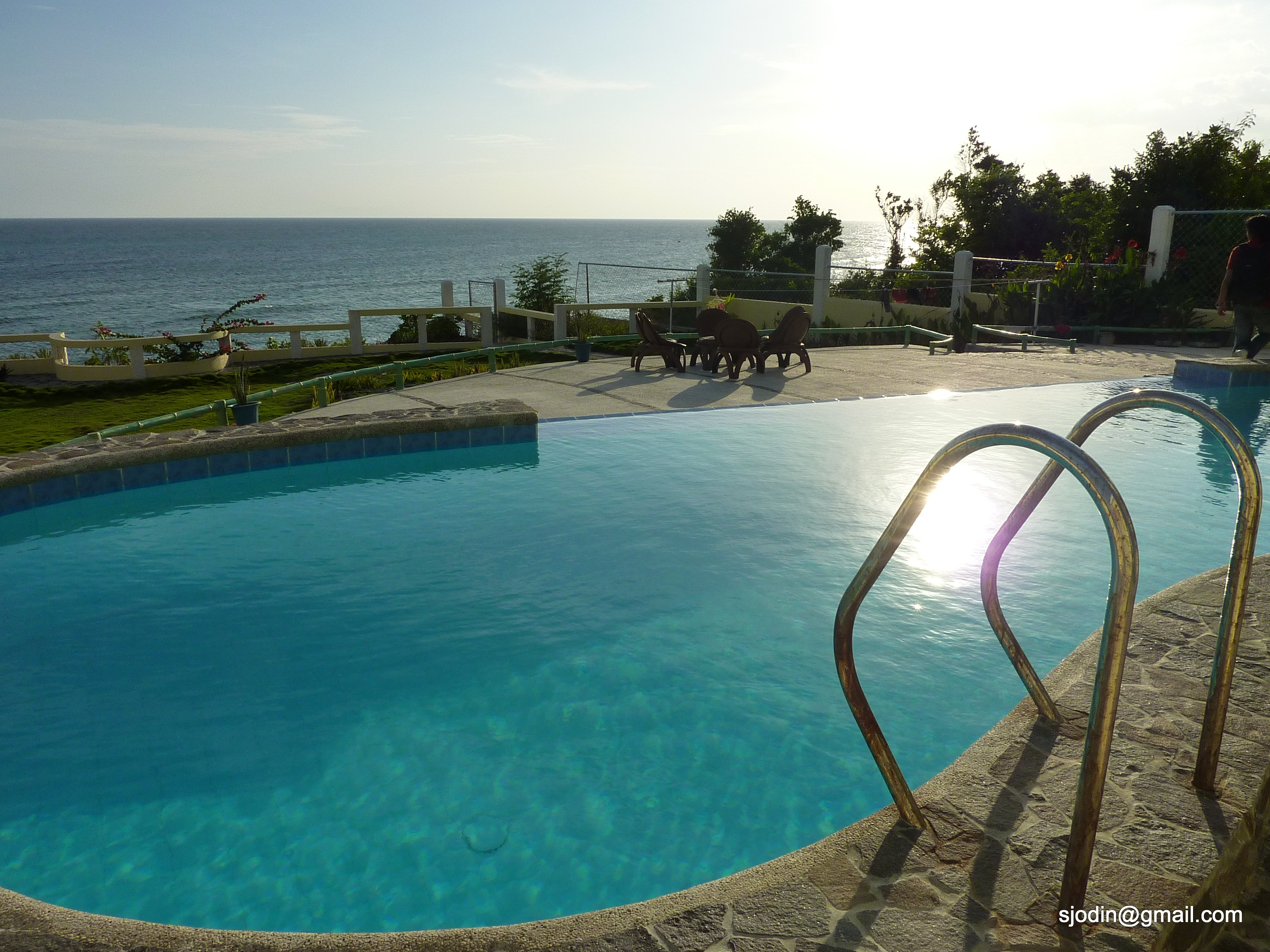
Swimming pool overlooking the Bohol sea
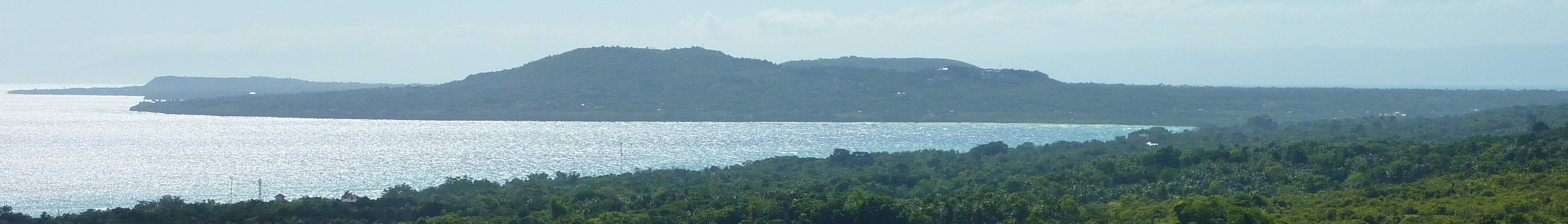
View of Bohol sea from The Barangay of Cambanac
