= Philippine Ports Authority =

Government-owned corporation of the Philippines

- Pangasiwaan sa mga Daungan ng Pilipinas

Agency overview
- Formed: July 11, 1974; 52 years ago
- Superseding agency: Seaports of the Philippines
- Headquarters: PPA Corporate Bldg. Bonifacio Drive, South Harbor, Port Area, Manila 1018, Philippines
- Agency executive: Jay Daniel R. Santiago, General Manager
- Parent agency: Department of Transportation
- Website: www.ppa.com.ph

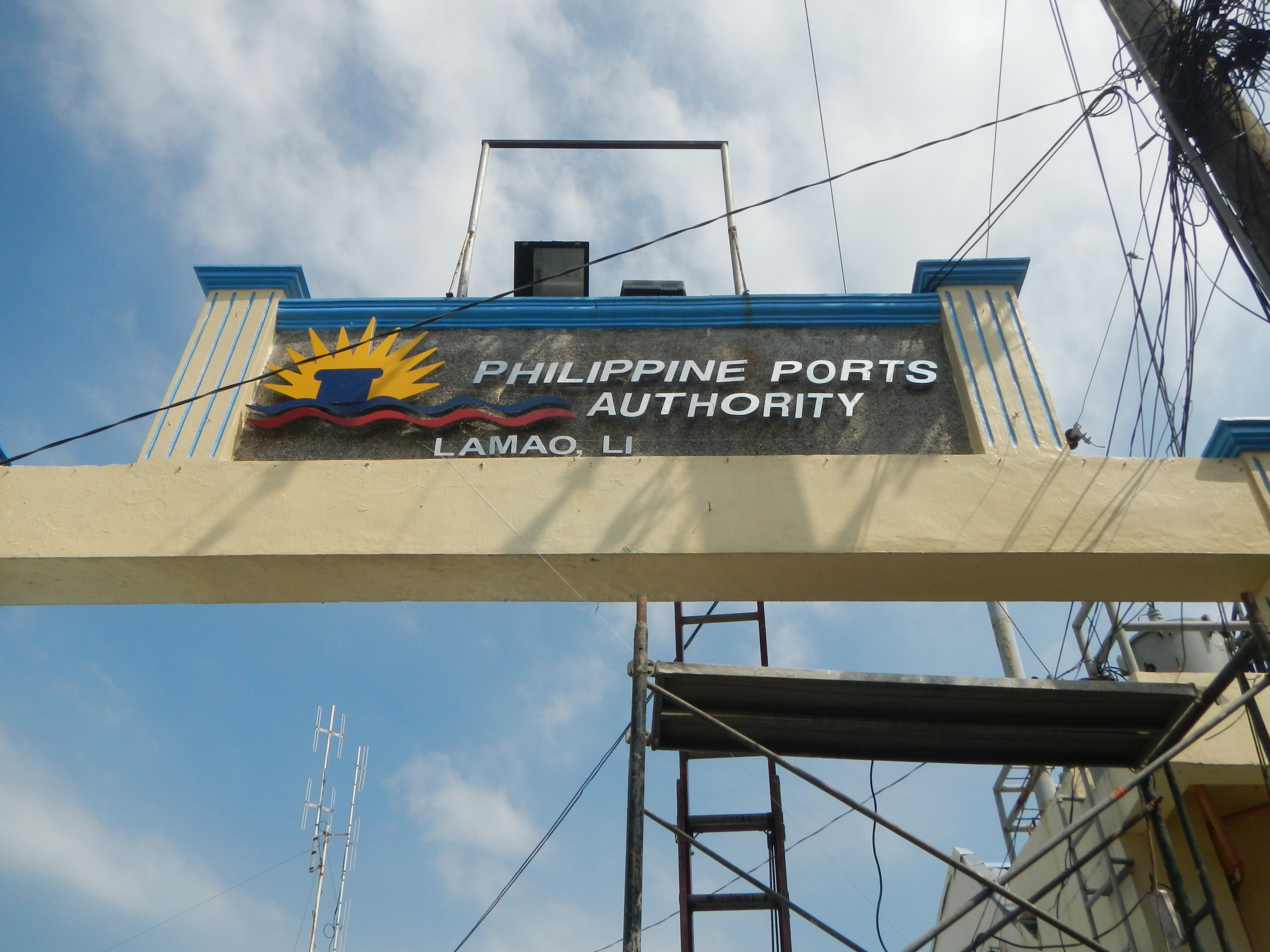
PPA in Limay, Bataan

The Philippine Ports Authority (PPA; Filipino: Pangasiwaan sa mga Daungan ng Pilipinas) is a government-owned and controlled corporation under the Department of Transportation as an attached agency. It is responsible for the financing, management and operations of public ports throughout the Philippines, except the port of Cebu, which is under the Cebu Ports Authority.

== History ==
Prior to the creation of PPA, port administration in the Philippines was merged with the traditional function of revenue collection of the Bureau of Customs (BOC). Port and harbor maintenance was the responsibility of the Bureau of Public Works (BPW) now Department of Public Works and Highways (DPWH). In the early 1970s, there were already 591 national planning, development, operations, and regulation at the national level. Around this time, the BOC had proposed to the Reorganization Committee and to Congress the creation of a separate government agency to integrate the functions of port development, operations, maintenance and cargo handling to enable the Bureau to concentrate on tax and customs duties collection. Hence, the PPA was created under Presidential Decree No. 505, which was subsequently amended by P.D. No. 857 in December 1975. The latter decree broadened the scope and functions of the PPA to facilitate the implementation of an integrated program for the planning, development, financing, operation, and maintenance of ports or port districts for the entire country. In 1978, the charter was further amended by Executive Order No. 513, the salient features of which were the granting of police authority to the PPA, the creation of a National Ports Advisory Council (NPAC) to strengthen cooperation between the government and the private sector, and the empowering of the Authority to exact reasonable administrative fines for specific violations of its rules and regulations. By virtue of its charter, the PPA was attached to what was then the DPWH's responsibility. The executive order also granted PPA financial autonomy.

== Just compensation award ==
On August 24, 2007, the Philippine Supreme Court (per 24-page decision by Angelina Sandoval-Gutierrez), ordered the PPA to pay 231 residents of Batangas City the just compensation sum of P6 billion as payment of 185 lots it bought in 2001 for the construction of Phase 2 of the Batangas Port Zone. On September 6, 2007, the Supreme Court of the Philippines ordered status quo on PPA expropriation in Batangas of 1,298,340 square meters of land intended for the development of Phase II of the Batangas City port.

To ease congestion at the Port of Manila, President Benigno S.C. Aquino III signed Executive Order No. 172 on September 13, declaring the Batangas International Port and the Port of Subic as extensions of the Manila International Container Terminal and South Harbor. Under the order, those ports may be activated as extensions of the Port of Manila whenever congestion or emergency situations, including strikes, lockouts, or natural calamities, cause serious disruptions to port operations. The designation of specific facilities within the Batangas and Subic Bay Freeport was to be determined by the Philippine Ports Authority and the Subic Bay Metropolitan Authority, upon a declaration by the Transportation Secretary based on a recommendation from the PPA. Foreign vessels bound for or departing from the Port of Manila could accordingly be directed to berth at either of those ports, with such berthing treated as equivalent to berthing at the Port of Manila.

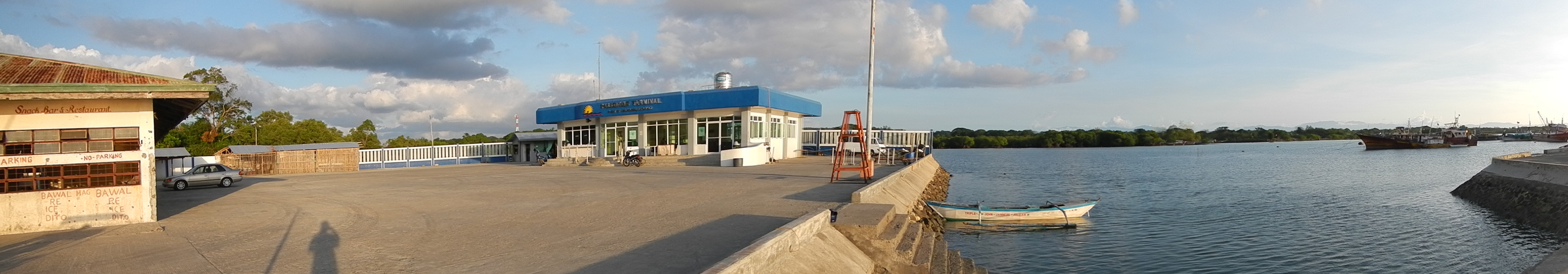
Port of Calatagan, Batangas

== See also ==
- Transportation in the Philippines
- Strong Republic Nautical Highway
- List of ports in the Philippines
