= The Amazing Race Philippines 1 =

Season of television series

- Season 1
- Presented by: Derek Ramsay
- No. of teams: 11
- Winners: LJ Moreno & CJ Jaravata
- No. of legs: 13
- Distance traveled: 3,000 km (1,900 mi)
- No. of episodes: 41

Release
- Original network: TV5
- Original release: October 29 – December 15, 2012

Additional information
- Filming dates: June 7 – June 29, 2012

Season chronology
- Next → Season 2

The Amazing Race Philippines 1 is the first season of The Amazing Race Philippines. It featured eleven teams of two, each with a pre-existing relationship, in a race around the Philippines to win ₱2 million. The show is hosted by Derek Ramsay.

The show premiered on October 29, 2012. It aired every Mondays to Fridays at 9:00 p.m. (PST) and Saturdays at 8:30 p.m. (PST) on TV5; Also, a special marathon episode of every 6 weekly episodes aired on Sundays at 9:30 p.m. (PST).

Celebrity best friends Lari Jeanne "LJ" Moreno and Criselda Janice "CJ" Jaravata were the winners of this season.

== Production ==
=== Development and filming ===
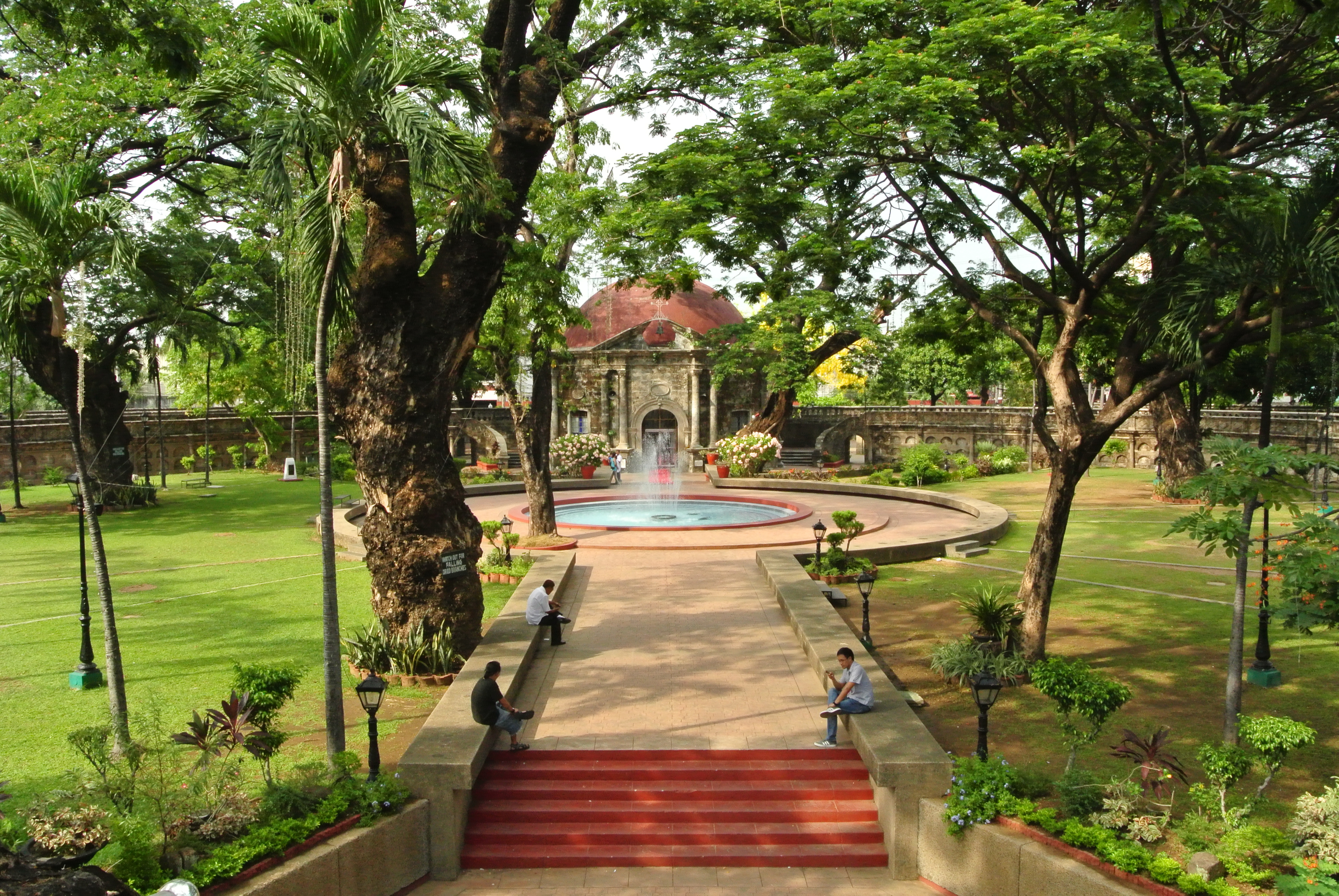
Racers gathered at Paco Park in Manila to begin the inaugural season of The Amazing Race Philippines.

In late 2011, TV5 announced that it has acquired the rights to air a local version of the reality show in the Philippines. Filming took place in June of the following year. TV5 had commissioned the Australian production company, activeTV to produce the show.

To promote the show, a mini race for the press was held on October 18, 2012 in Eastwood City. Press members were paired with a team from the race and completed different tasks together. Teams had also appeared on various TV5 shows. Teams were interviewed on talk shows like Ang Latest and Good Morning Club, appeared on game shows like Million Peso Money Drop, Wiltime Bigtime among others.

Leg 1 featured theater actor and director Audie Gemora as a judge in the "Bingo" task and game show host Arnell Ignacio as the quizmaster of the Ikot Detour choice.

=== Casting ===
Auditions were held from March 5, 2012 to April 27, 2012 (extended from April 2, 2012). Applicants had to be at least 21 years old, a Filipino citizen or a permanent resident of the Philippines. Auditions were done via three methods: online, mail-in, and on-ground at TV5 Broadway Studio in Quezon City and at other various locations.

=== Broadcasting ===
Unlike its international counterparts, the show was broadcast as a weekday program airing 30 minutes per episode in 6 times a week, Monday through Saturday, compared to other versions of the show which airs 1 to 2 episodes per week. Also, a special marathon episode of the daily episodes per week aired on Sundays.

On December 10, 2012, the show was preempted in order to give way for TV5's telethon to support the victims of Typhoon Bopha (local name: Pablo).

== Cast ==
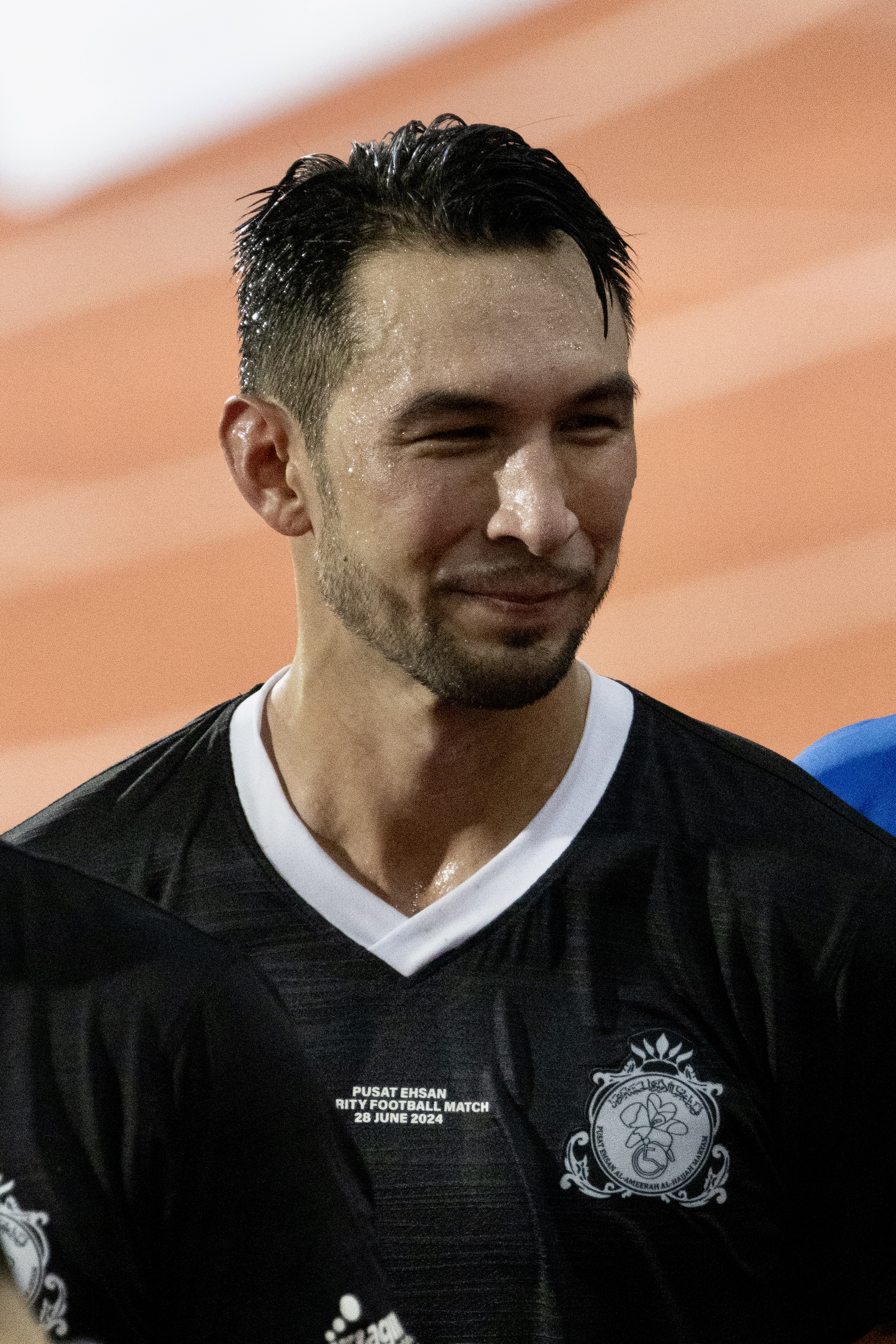
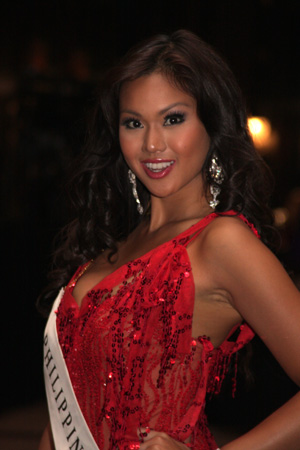
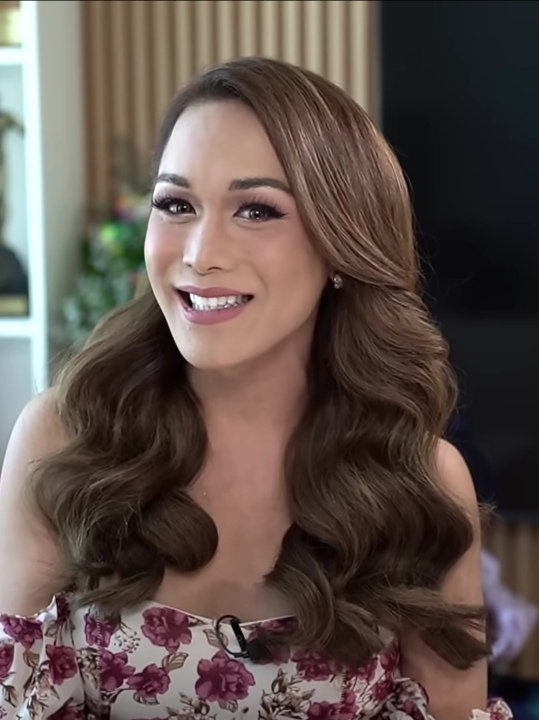
From left to right: Anton del Rosario, Dani Castaño, and Jervi Li

On October 19, 2012, the contestants were revealed. The cast includes celebrity best friends CJ Jaravata and LJ Moreno, beauty queen Danielle "Dani" Castaño, who represented the Philippines in Miss World 2008, and football player brothers Anton and Armand del Rosario. Jervi Lisaba was the first transgender contestant to compete on any series of The Amazing Race.

Contestants	Age	Relationship	Hometown	Status
Crystel Castro	25	Dating Couple	Angeles City, Pampanga	Eliminated 1st (in Manila, Metro Manila)
Mykey Lacson	33	Dating Couple	Angeles City, Pampanga	Eliminated 1st (in Manila, Metro Manila)
Anton del Rosario	30	Football Brothers	Makati, Metro Manila	Eliminated 2nd (in Vigan, Ilocos Sur)
Armand del Rosario	33	Football Brothers	Makati, Metro Manila	Eliminated 2nd (in Vigan, Ilocos Sur)
Pamela Spella	41	Alabang Housewives	Muntinlupa, Metro Manila	Eliminated 3rd (in Baguio, Benguet)
Vanessa Ishitani	35	Alabang Housewives	Muntinlupa, Metro Manila	Eliminated 3rd (in Baguio, Benguet)
Danielle "Dani" Castaño	22	Bombshells	Quezon City, Metro Manila	Eliminated 4th (in Capas, Tarlac)
Michelle "Mish" van Ruyven	23	Bombshells	Vancouver, Canada	Eliminated 4th (in Capas, Tarlac)
Ed Movido	47	Father & Daughter	Angeles City, Pampanga	Eliminated 5th (in Bacacay, Albay)
Angel Movido	22	Father & Daughter	Angeles City, Pampanga	Eliminated 5th (in Bacacay, Albay)
Raymund "Boom" Vergara	27	Buddies	Valenzuela, Metro Manila	Eliminated 6th (in Cebu City, Cebu)
Cheng Enriquez	40	Buddies	Valenzuela, Metro Manila	Eliminated 6th (in Cebu City, Cebu)
Saida Diola	24	Amigas	San Juan, Batangas	Eliminated 7th (in Boracay, Aklan)
Jervi Lisaba	22	Amigas	Ozamiz, Misamis Occidental	Eliminated 7th (in Boracay, Aklan)
Sheena Vera Cruz	27	Reunited Friends	Guam, United States	Eliminated 8th (in Puerto Princesa, Palawan)
Gazelle "Gee" Canlas	24	Reunited Friends	Antipolo, Rizal	Eliminated 8th (in Puerto Princesa, Palawan)
Marc Duñgo	42	Gym Buddies	Parañaque, Metro Manila	Third Place
Kat Tan	27	Gym Buddies	Manila, Metro Manila	Third Place
Fausto Reyes	33	Brothers-in-law	Pasay, Metro Manila	Second Place
Dayal Chowdary, Jr.	25	Brothers-in-law	Pasay, Metro Manila	Second Place
Lari "LJ" Moreno	31	Celebrity Bestfriends	Dagupan, Pangasinan	Winners
Criselda "CJ" Jaravata	29	Celebrity Bestfriends	Makati, Metro Manila	Winners

Future appearances

After the show, teams appeared on some of the network's TV shows. Pamela & Vanessa later appeared on their own reality show titled after their moniker on the show, The Alabang Housewives. Dani & Mish also guested on some episodes of Pinoy Explorer.

== Results ==
The following teams participated in the season, each listed along with their placements in each leg and their team name as identified by the program. Note that this table is not necessarily reflective of all content broadcast on television, owing to the inclusion or exclusion of some data. Placements are listed in finishing order:

Team	Position (by leg)													Roadblocks performed
Team	1	2^{2}	3	4	5 (Note: There was no mandatory rest period at the Pit Stop and all teams were ordered to continue racing.)	6	7	8	9	10	11	12	13	Roadblocks performed
LJ & CJ	7th	2nd (Note: The team worked together with Marc & Kat during part of the leg as a result of an Intersection.)	2nd	4th (Note: The team received the Yield.)	6th (Note: The team chose to use the Yield.)	5th (Note: The team chose to use the U-Turn.)	5th	5th	3rd (Note: The team worked together with Boom & Cheng during part of the leg as a result of an Intersection.)	2nd	2nd	3rd	1st	LJ 7, CJ 7
Fausto & Dayal	9th	8th (Note: The team worked together with Dani & Mish during part of the leg as a result of an Intersection.)	8th^{5}	7th	2nd	2nd	1st	3rd	1st^{13}	1st (Note: The team won a Fast Forward.)	3rd	2nd	2nd^{17}	Fausto 7, Dayal 6
Marc & Kat	1st	1st (Note: The team used the Salvage Pass on that leg to bypass a time limit instead of using it to save the last place team from elimination.) (Note: The team worked together with LJ & CJ during part of the leg as a result of an Intersection.)^{3}	1st	1st	4th (Note: The team decided to use the Express Pass on that leg.)^{7}	3rd	2nd^{10}	1st	2nd (Note: The team worked together with Fausto & Dayal during part of the leg as a result of an Intersection.)	3rd^{15}	1st	1st	3rd	Marc 8, Kat 6
Sheena & Gee	5th	6th (Note: The team worked together with Pamela & Vanessa during part of the leg as a result of an Intersection.)	5th	6th	7th	4th	4th	6th	5th (Note: The team worked together with Saida & Jervi during part of the leg as a result of an Intersection.)^{14}	4th	4th (Note: The team came in last on a non-elimination leg. (Note: The team has been "marked for elimination" which means that if they did not finish the next leg in first place, they would receive an automatic 30-minute penalty.))	4th (Note: Eliminated.)^{16}		Sheena 7, Gee 5
Saida & Jervi	4th	3rd (Note: The team worked together with Ed & Angel during part of the leg as a result of an Intersection.)	4th	2nd	5th	6th	6th	4th	4th (Note: The team worked together with Sheena & Gee during part of the leg as a result of an Intersection.)	5th				Saida 6, Jervi 4
Boom & Cheng	2nd	5th (Note: The team worked together with Anton & Armand during part of the leg as a result of an Intersection.)	3rd	3rd	1st	1st	3rd^{10}	2nd	6th^{13}					Boom 7, Cheng 2
Ed & Angel	8th	4th	7th	8th	3rd	7th	7th^{11}	7th^{12}						Ed 5, Angel 3
Dani & Mish	3rd	7th	6th	5th	8th (Note: The team came in last and was not eliminated.)^{8}	8th (Note: The team received the U-Turn.)^{9}								Dani 2, Mish 4^{9}
Pamela & Vanessa	10th^{1}	9th	9th (Note: The team came in last on a non-elimination leg. (Note: The team has not received a penalty.))	9th^{6}										Pamela 2, Vanessa 2
Anton & Armand	6th	10th^{4}												Anton 1, Armand 1
Crystel & Mykey	11th^{1}													Crystel 1, Mykey 0

=== Notes ===
1. ^^{a} ^{b} Due to rain, Crystel & Mykey and Pamela & Vanessa were unable to complete either Detour choices at Star City and instead, had their next clues given to them.
2. Boom & Cheng and Anton & Armand were each issued 14-minute penalties after breaking 14 jars in the burnay jar transporting task; Pamela & Vanessa and Sheena & Gee, 20 minutes for 20 jars; Fausto & Dayal and Dani & Mish, 11 minutes for 11 jars.
3. Marc & Kat used their Salvage Pass to enter the Bantay Bell Tower before the "Hours of Operation."
4. Anton & Armand initially arrived 4th, but were issued a 24-hour penalty as they contacted someone outside the race, which was strictly prohibited against the show's rules. The last six teams trailing them checked-in during their penalty time, dropping Anton & Armand to last place and resulting in their elimination.
5. Fausto & Dayal initially arrived 6th, but did not perform an additional task at the Maligcong Rice Terraces. They were instructed to perform the additional task before they could be checked in. Dani & Mish and Ed & Angel checked-in while they went back, dropping Fausto & Dayal to 8th.
6. Pamela & Vanessa did not complete final task. Already in last place, they were allowed to check-in at the Pit Stop and were eliminated without being assessed a penalty.
7. Marc & Kat used the Express Pass to bypass the Roadblock in Leg 5. Before using the Express Pass, Marc elected to perform the Roadblock, and this is reflected in the total Roadblock count.
8. Dani & Mish were issued a 20-minute penalty at the Roadblock site due to Dani asking Dayal the answer to the Roadblock puzzle. They had to turn the hourglass at the nearby Yield station before continuing with their Roadblock.
9. Dani did not finish the Roadblock after three attempts and she & Mish were issued a 4-hour penalty at the Roadblock site.
10. ^^{a} ^{b} Boom & Cheng and Marc & Kat were each issued 1-hour penalties upon arrival at Manila for not riding a jeepney from the Pit Start to the bus terminal.
11. Ed & Angel did not finish the task at the Red Labuyo Restaurant and were issued a 2-hour penalty. They arrived at the Pit Stop last, but were notified that it was a non-elimination leg. The 2-hour penalty they would have taken from the task was instead applied to their starting time in Leg 8.
12. Ed & Angel had been "Marked for Elimination"; however, after the other teams had checked-in, Derek came out to Luyang Beach and eliminated them without the 30-minute penalty being issued.
13. ^^{a} ^{b} Boom & Cheng and Fausto & Dayal were each issued 40-minute penalties after arriving at Mactan–Cebu International Airport for booking business class tickets instead of economy class tickets.
14. Sheena & Gee initially arrived 5th, but were not immediately allowed to check in because they did not come into agreement with their driver in their fare. Derek questioned the taxi driver and accepted; allowing Sheena & Gee to check-in. This did not affect their placement.
15. Marc & Kat initially arrived 2nd, but were issued a 40-minute penalty for untying the ropes used at the Lulubog Detour. LJ & CJ checked in during their penalty time, dropping Marc & Kat to 3rd.
16. Sheena & Gee initially arrived 3rd, but were issued a 30-minute penalty for being "Marked for Elimination" and not arriving 1st. LJ & CJ checked in during the penalty time, dropping Sheena & Gee to last place and resulting in their elimination.
17. At the Smart Puerto Princesa challenge on Leg 13, Fausto & Dayal were issued a 15-minute penalty for using one of the illegal words in the description.

=== Voting history ===
In addition to the original Yield format used on the fourth and ninth legs, where only a single team could Yield another team of their choosing, all teams on the fifth and sixth legs voted for who should receive the Yield and U-Turn. This format is similar to the format introduced on the second season of Israel's version of The Amazing Race, HaMerotz LaMillion. Teams would encounter, at the beginning of the leg, a board where they had to cast their vote for the team they wanted to either Yield (Leg 5) or U-Turn (Leg 6). The team with the most Yield votes had to stop racing for a predetermined amount of time later in the leg before continuing; while the team who has the most U-Turn votes must complete both tasks of the Detour.

	Yield	U-Turn
Leg #	5	6
U-Turned/Yielded	Marc & Kat; Dani & Mish	Dani & Mish
Result	3–3–1–1	3–2–2–1
Voter	Vote	
LJ & CJ	Dani & Mish	Dani & Mish
Fausto & Dayal	Marc & Kat	Marc & Kat
Marc & Kat	Dani & Mish	Dani & Mish
Sheena & Gee	Fausto & Dayal	Fausto & Dayal
Saida & Jervi	Dani & Mish	Dani & Mish
Boom & Cheng	LJ & CJ	Fausto & Dayal
Ed & Angel	Marc & Kat	Marc & Kat
Dani & Mish	Marc & Kat	LJ & CJ

== Prizes ==
The prize for each leg, with the exception of Leg 5, was awarded to the first place team for that leg. The ₱200,000 cash prizes for Legs 1 to 10 were sponsored by American Tourister, the ₱200,000 cash prize in Leg 11 was sponsored by Smart Communications, and the prize for Leg 12 was a one-year supply of fuel with Techron and was sponsored by Caltex. The ₱2,000,000 grand prize was sponsored by Brother Industries Philippines. Additional prizes were awarded as follows:

- The winners of Leg 1 won the Salvage Pass, enabling them to either save the last place team from elimination or receive a 30-minute headstart at any point where they are faced with a time restriction.
- The winners of Leg 3 won the Express Pass, allowing them at a later point during the race to bypass any task and automatically receive their next clue.
- In Leg 11, the team that finished the printer task at Marajo Tower the fastest were awarded ₱100,000 worth of printers and printing supplies courtesy of Brother Industries Philippines; it was coincidental that the winners of the regular ₱200,000 prize also won the bonus prize.

== Race summary ==
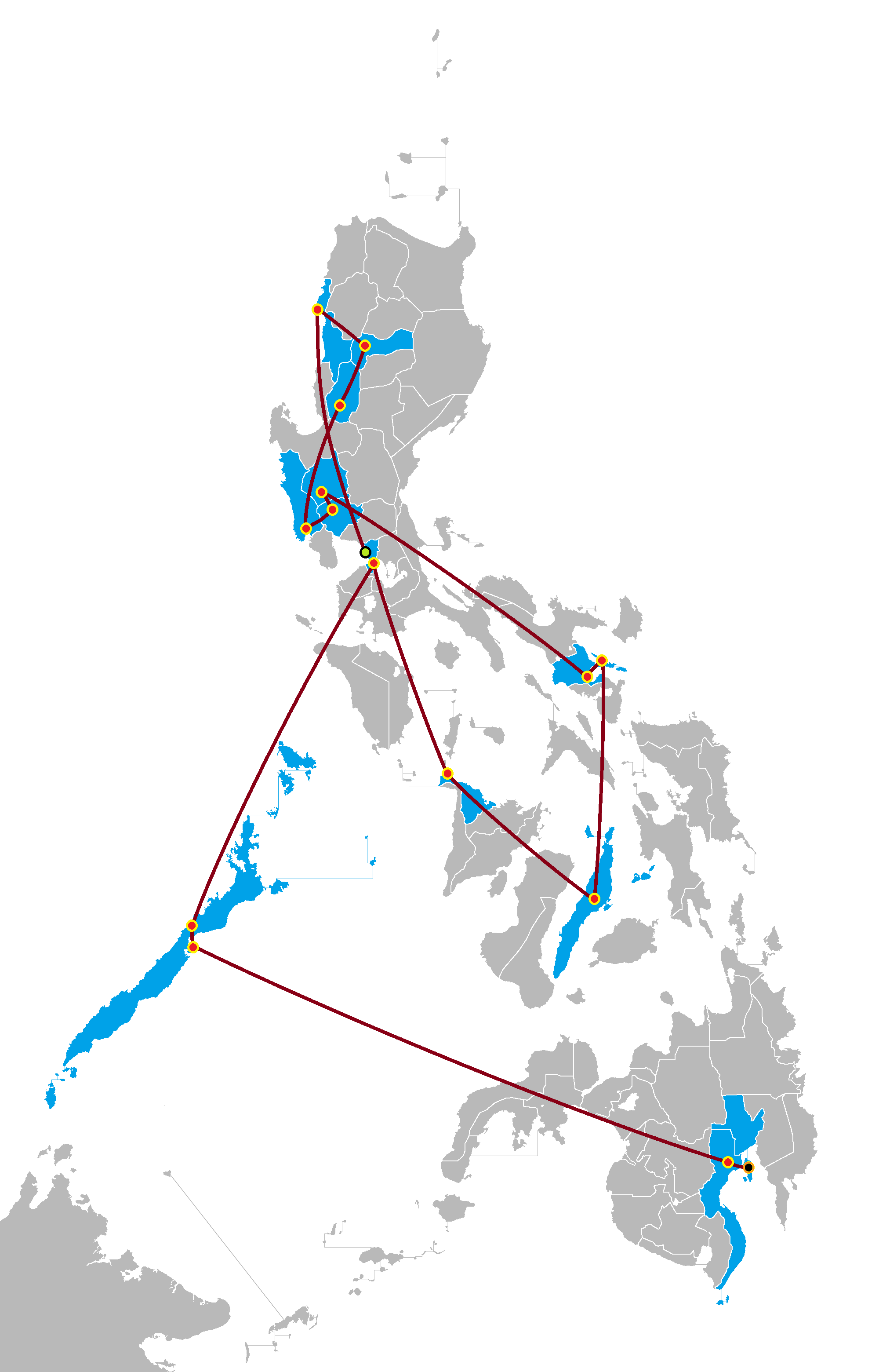
The complete route map of The Amazing Race Philippines 1.

Destinations	Air travel Rail travel Water travel Bus travel Helicopter travel Bicycle travel Gondola travel
Route Markers	Detour Roadblock Fast Forward U-Turn Yield Intersection Pit Stop

=== Leg 1 (Metro Manila) ===
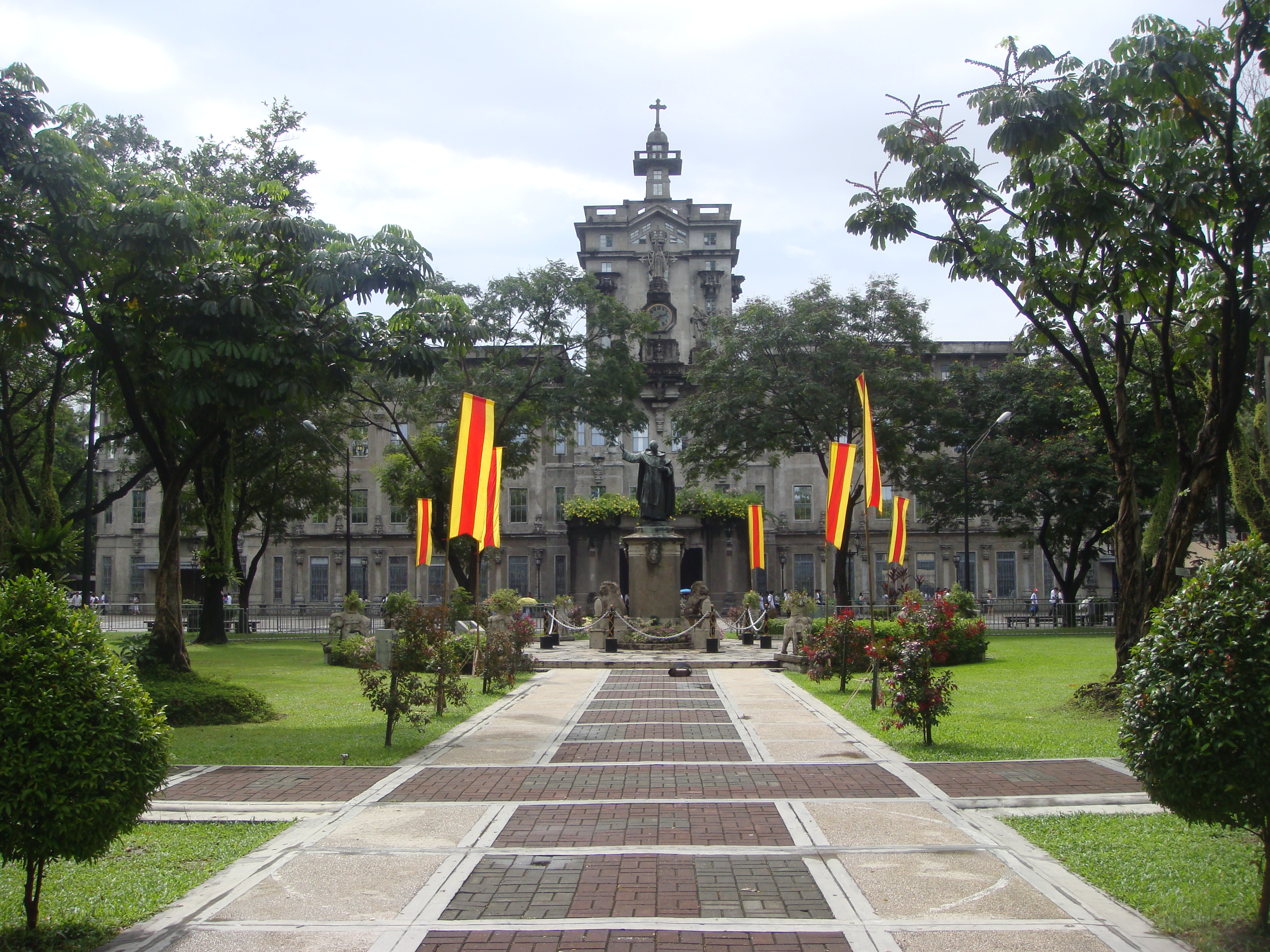
The first Pit Stop of The Amazing Race Philippines took place at University of Santo Tomas in Manila.

Airdates: October 29–November 2, 2012

- Manila, Metro Manila, Philippines (Paco Park) (Starting Line)
- Manila (Manila Yacht Club)
- Pasay (Midas Hotel and Casino)
- Pasay (Cuneta Astrodome)
- Manila (Plaza Miranda)
- Pasay (Star City)
- Manila (University of Santo Tomas)

In this series' first Roadblock, one team member had to throw five basketballs from the 15-foot (4.6 m) free throw line into a hoop to receive their next clue.

This series' first Detour was a choice between Pindot (Press) or Ikot (Spin). In Pindot, teams had to find and take a picture of a route marker flag located in another ride called the Wild River using an Olympus camera while riding an inverted roller coaster called the Star Flyer to receive their next clue. In Ikot, teams had to solve three mathematical questions while riding a pendulum ride called the Star Frisbee to receive their next clue from the quizmaster Arnell Ignacio. If teams failed to answer a question correctly, they would have to repeat the ride again.

Additional tasks

- At the Manila Yacht Club, teams had to decode nautical flags with decoders scattered around the area. The phrase needed to get their next clue was "Blue Skies and Calm Waters".
- At Midas Hotel and Casino, teams had to change into formal wear and enter the casino to play a special game of Baccarat. The chips they would earn had letters on them that they needed in order to spell out their next destination (Astrodome) and receive their next clue.
- At Plaza Miranda, teams had to convince twelve people to sing the song "Bingo" with them and a Rondalla band to the satisfaction of Audie Gemora to receive their next clue.

=== Leg 2 (Metro Manila → Ilocos Sur) ===
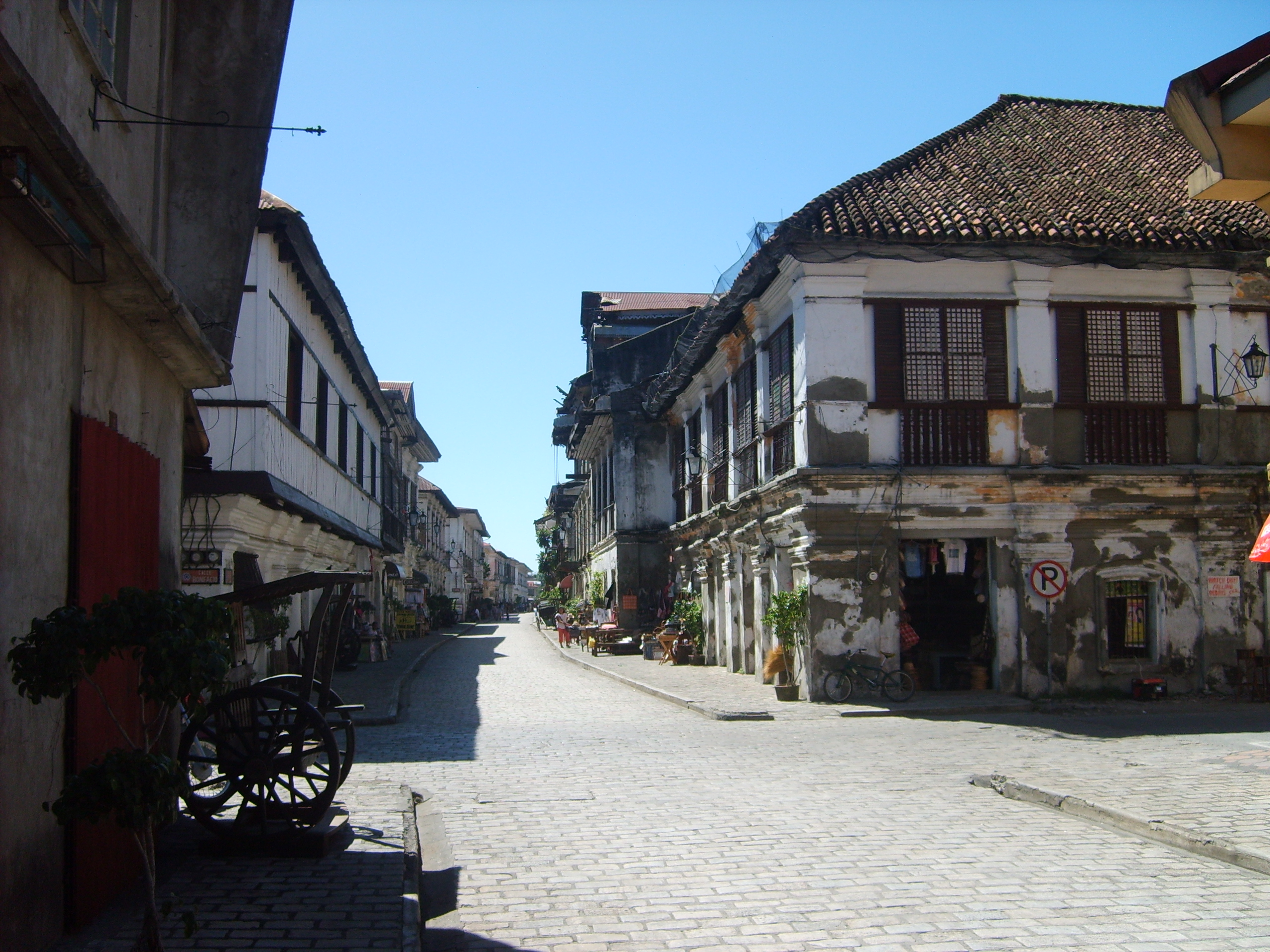
In the historic town of Vigan, teams had to transport 60 burnay jars to a marked store on Calle Crisologo.

Airdates: November 3 & 5–6, 2012

- Manila (Florida Bus Terminal) to Vigan, Ilocos Sur
- Bantay (Bantay Bell Tower)
- Vigan (Vigan City Public Market)
- Vigan (Pagburnayan District)
- Vigan (Calle Crisologo)
- Bantay (Quirino Bridge)
- Vigan (Plaza Burgos)
- Vigan (St. Paul Metropolitan Cathedral)

This leg's Detour was a choice between Gawa (Work) or Nguya (Chew). In Gawa, teams had to make two dozen Vigan longganisas to the satisfaction of the vendor to receive their next clue. In Nguya, teams had to eat a plate of 70 Vigan longganisas to receive their next clue.

In this leg's Roadblock, one team member had to paddle a kayak through the river to reach their partner, who had rappel down from bridge. Once team members were reunited, the paddler then had to reach the river banks to receive their next clue.

Additional tasks

- In Pagburnayan District, teams encountered an Intersection. After pairing up, Intersected teams had to transport 60 burnay jars to a marked shop on Calle Crisologo using a horse-drawn bamboo cart called a kariton to receive their next clue. If the Intersected teams broke more than five jars, the teams would incur a one-minute time penalty per each broken jar. After this task, teams were no longer Intersected.
- At Plaza Burgos, teams had to participate in a traditional pukpok palayok game. One team member would be blindfolded and had to smash a clay pot containing their next clue. The other member had to use a tambourine to help guide their blindfolded partner to the pot.

=== Leg 3 (Ilocos Sur → Mountain Province) ===
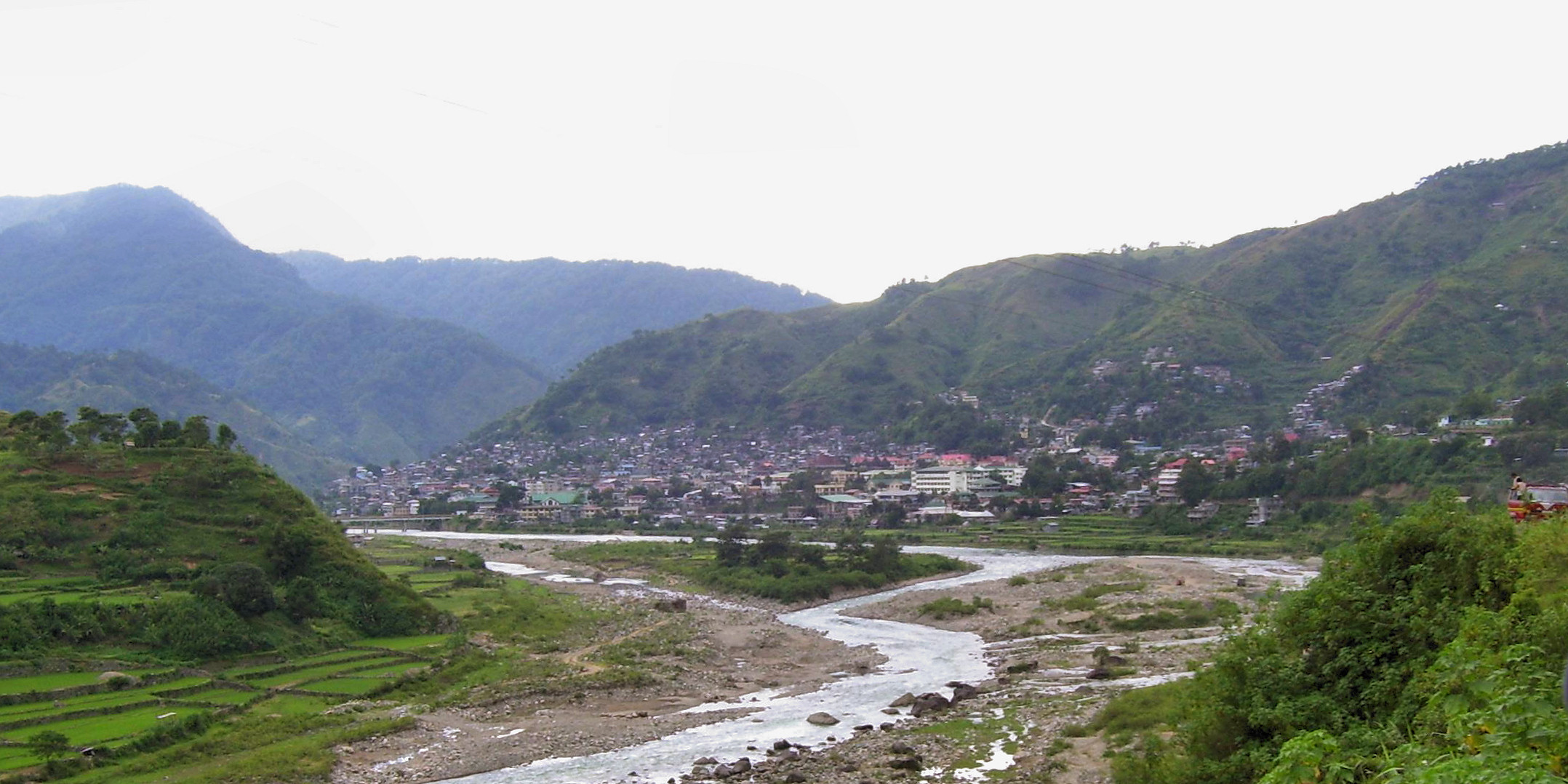
The third leg took place in the town of Bontoc, Mountain Province and its surrounding rice terraces.

Airdates: November 7–9, 2012

- Bontoc, Mountain Province (Kadchog Hanging Bridge)
- Bontoc (Kadchog Rice Terraces)
- Bontoc (Kimakim's Chicken Farm and Bontoc Public Market or Rice Field)
- Bontoc (Provincial Plaza)
- Bontoc (Maligcong Rice Terraces)

This leg's Detour was a choice between Magkarga (Carry) or Magsaka (Plow). In Magkarga, teams had to gather 20 chickens at Kimakim's Chicken Farm and deliver them to the Bontoc Public Market to receive their next clue. In Magsaka, teams had to plow a rice field with the aid of a carabao to find an Amazing Race flag within the mud to receive their next clue.

In this leg's Roadblock, one team member had to perform a traditional banga dance, which involved balancing a jar atop their head for 90 seconds to receive their next clue. If the jar fell, the team member would have to wait for their turn again.

Additional tasks

- At the start of the leg, teams had to ride in a marked vehicle to the Kadchog Hanging Bridge. After crossing the bridge, teams had to search among several clue boxes placed among sections of the Kadchog Rice Terraces for the correct one with their next clue.
- After the Roadblock, teams had to ride in a marked jeepney to the Maligcong Rice Terraces, where each team member had to pack a sack with 20 kilograms (44 lb) of rice and carry it to the Pit Stop.

=== Leg 4 (Mountain Province → Benguet) ===
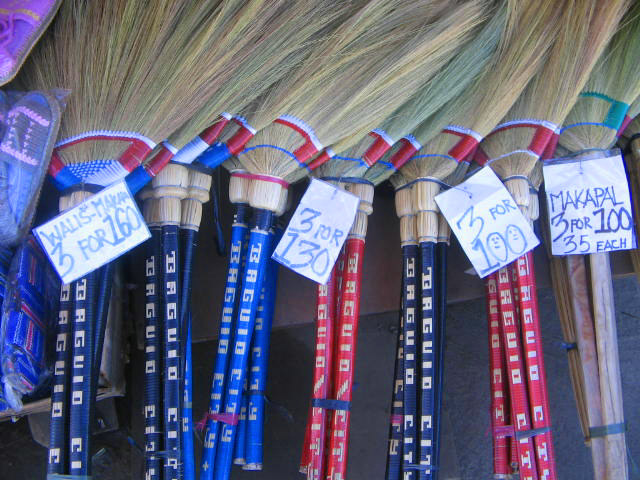
One of the Detour choices in Baguio was selling 10 pieces of a popular local craft: homemade softbrooms.

Airdates: November 10 & 12–13, 2012

- Bontoc (Samoki Bridge) (Pit Start)
- Bontoc (Bontoc Municipal Police Station) to Baguio, Benguet (Rising Sun Bus Terminal or Lizardo Bus Terminal)
- Itogon (Balatoc Mines)
- Baguio (Baguio City Market)
- Baguio (Baguio City Market – B.M. Parungao Shoe Store)
- Baguio (Our Lady of Lourdes Grotto)

In this leg's Roadblock, one team member had to ride a cart into a mine and search for a key in the holes of the mine shaft to open a chest with a gold bullion that they had to bring outside the mine to a gold miner to receive their next clue.

This leg's Detour was a choice between Sell 10 or Buy 10. In Sell 10, teams had to sell 10 broomsticks for 60 pesos each to receive their next clue. In Buy 10, teams had to buy 10 items listed in a photo album within an allocated budget to receive their next clue.

Additional tasks

- At B.M. Parungao Shoe Store, teams had to match up 10 pairs of shoes scattered over the shop to receive their next clue.
- After traveling by jeepney to the Our Lady of Lourdes Grotto, teams had to count the number of steps going the grotto (215) to check into the Pit Stop.

=== Leg 5 (Benguet → Zambales) ===
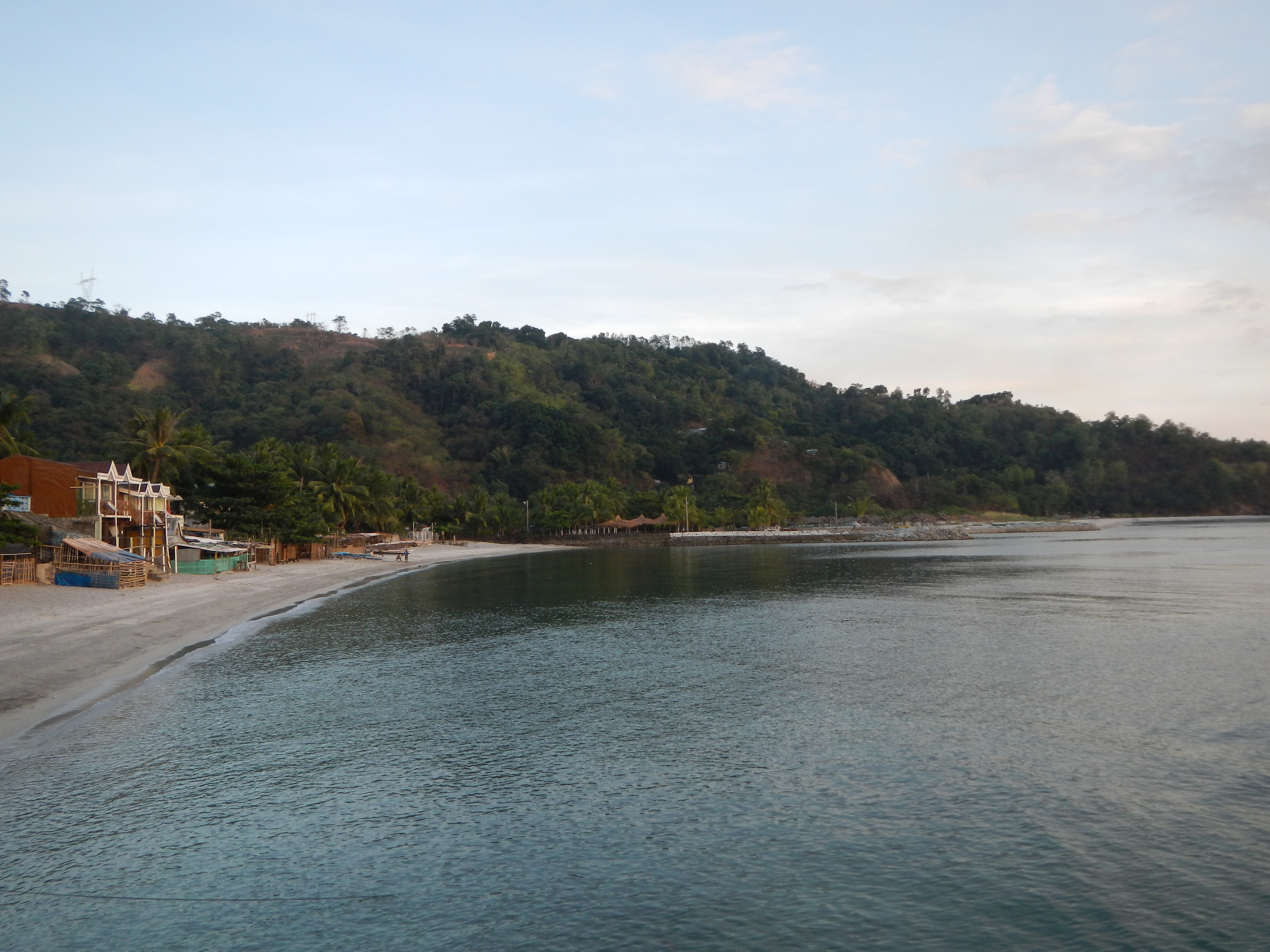
Teams visited Subic for the fifth leg.

Airdates: November 14–16, 2012

- Baguio (Baguio Cathedral) (Pit Start)
- Subic, Zambales (Subic Bay Freeport Zone – The Lighthouse Marina Resort)
- Subic (Zoobic Safari)
- Subic (Tree Top Adventure)
- Subic (Global Ship Terminal)
- Subic (El Kabayo Riding Stables)

In this leg's Roadblock, one team member had to solve a puzzle by arranging six Philippine Presidents in chronological order (Presidents Ferdinand Marcos to Benigno Aquino III) on tablet computer within a 15-second time limit while their partner was hanging on a harness 100 feet (30 m) above the ground. If the puzzle was correctly answered, their partner would be slowly lowered to the ground and the team would receive their next clue. If they failed to solve the puzzle within a time limit, their partner would free fall and they would have to repeat the task. Before starting this task, teams would encounter the Yield reveal board.

Additional tasks

- At Baguio Cathedral, teams had to vote for the team they wish to Yield before driving a car to The Lighthouse Marina Resort to find their next clue.
- At Zoobic Safari, teams had to feed tigers to receive their next clue.
- At the Global Ship Terminal, teams had to break open a solid concrete tube using the provided tools to retrieve their next clue.

=== Leg 6 (Zambales → Pampanga → Tarlac) ===
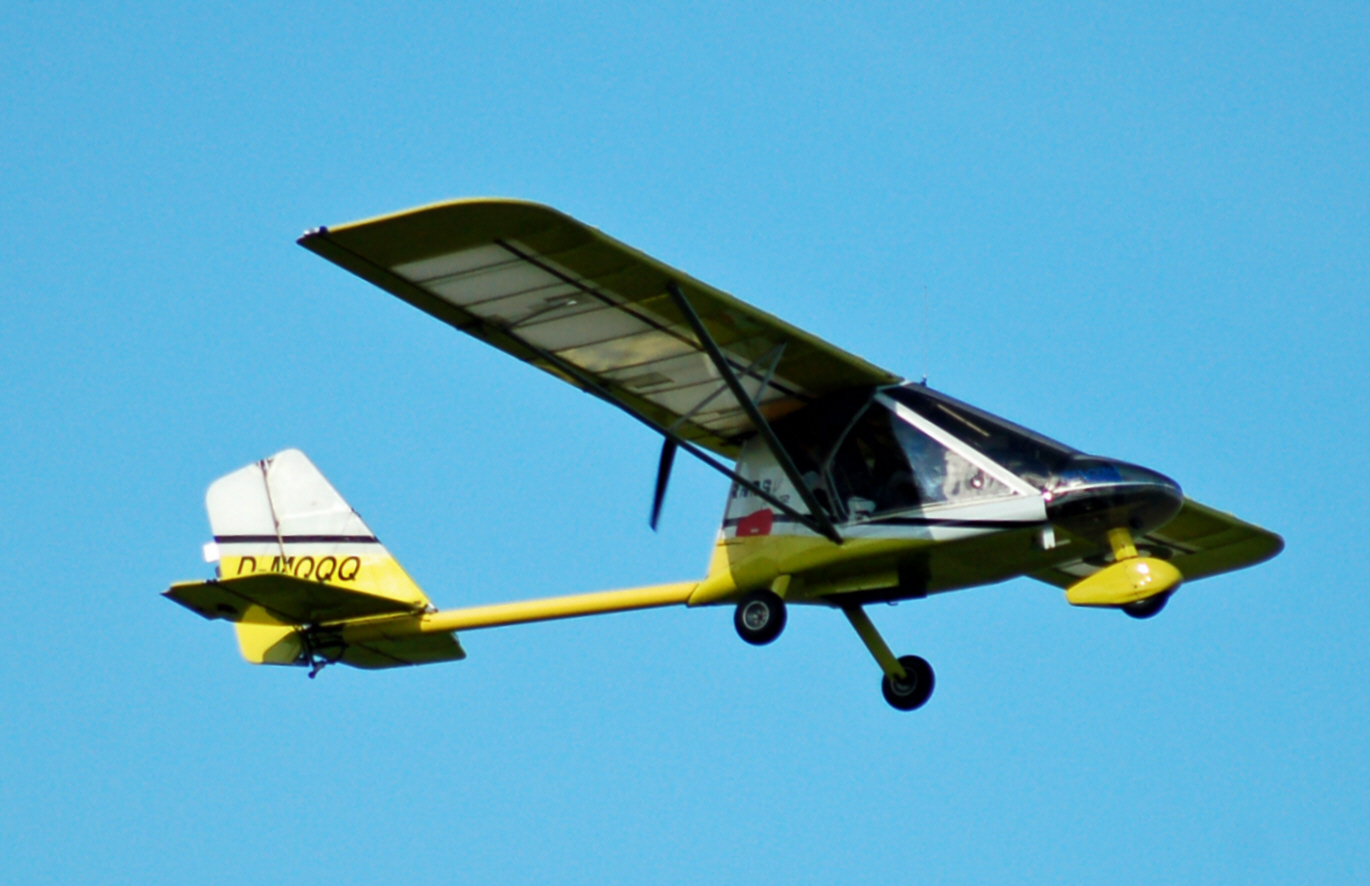
This leg's Roadblock had one team member ride in an ultralight aircraft to drop flour bombs onto a target.

Airdates: November 17 & 19, 2012

- Mabalacat, Pampanga (Clark Special Economic Zone – Air Force City Park)
- Magalang (Angeles City Flying Club) (Overnight Rest)
- Mabalacat (Clark Special Economic Zone – Clark Eagle Range and Gun Club)
- Angeles City (SM City Clark)
- Capas, Tarlac (Mount Pinatubo)
- Capas (Sitio Tarukan)

In this leg's Roadblock, one team member had to ride an ultralight aircraft, drop a flour bomb onto a target on the ground, and score a total of at least five points within three passes to receive their next clue.

This leg's Detour was a choice between Tamaan (Hit) or Iwasan (Evade). In Tamaan, teams had to shoot a specified area of a target using a pistol and a rifle to receive their next clue. In Iwasan, teams had to go through an obstacle course while evading paintball shooters to retrieve their next clue in the bags hung at the other end of the course.

Additional tasks

- At Air Force City Park, teams had to look for a T33 Thunderbird to find a board where they had to cast their vote for the team they want to U-Turn.
- At SM City Clark, teams had to park their car at a marked rectangle, seek the help of ten people to lift their car to another rectangular marking, and pack themselves and their volunteers into the car for 30 seconds to receive their next clue.
- From the foot of Mount Pinatubo, teams have to drive a 4x4 jeep to the Pit Stop at Sitio Tarukan.

=== Leg 7 (Pampanga → Albay) ===
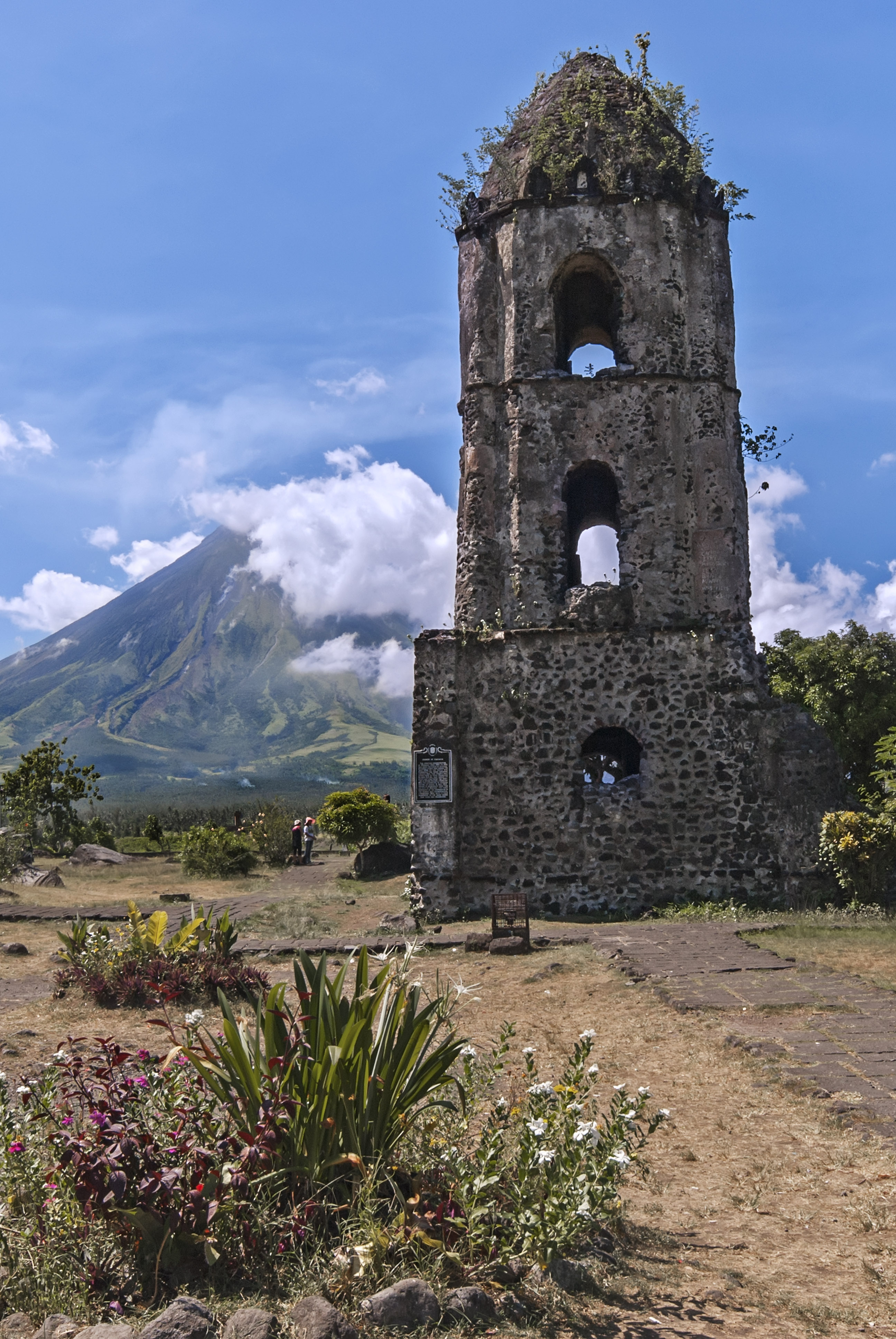
In this leg, teams visited the ruins of Cagsawa Church, a church destroyed by the Mayon Volcano.

Airdates: November 20–22, 2012

- Angeles, Pampanga (Holiday Inn Clark) (Pit Start)
- Mabalacat (Mabalacat Bus Terminal) to Legazpi, Albay (Legazpi Grand Central Terminal)
- Daraga (Red Labuyo Restaurant)
- Daraga (Cagsawa Ruins)
- Legazpi (Ligñon Hill – World War II Japanese Tunnel)
- Legazpi (Mayon – Bonga Gully Lava Wall)
- Legazpi (Legazpi Boulevard – Breakwater)

This leg's Detour was a choice between Jig or Pig. In Jig, teams had to don costumes and perform a traditional Ibalong dance to the satisfaction of two judges to receive their next clue. In Pig, team members had to cover each other in grease, enter a muddy pen to each catch two pigs, and place them in another pen to receive their next clue from a farmer.

In this leg's Roadblock, one team member had to pick one rolling suitcase among those that they had brought with them since the start of the leg and drive an all-terrain vehicle to deliver it to a local chieftain, who would open it. If they picked one without the clue, they would have to go back to their partner and choose another suitcase until they found the one with their next clue.

Additional tasks

- From the Holiday Inn Clark, teams had to carry eight American Tourister rolling suitcases all the way to the Pit Stop.
- At Red Labuyo Restaurant, both team members had to eat a bowl of Bicol express and a bowl of strawberry ice cream to receive their next clue.
- At the World War II Japanese tunnel, teams had to find their next clue, which was hidden inside an ammunition box.

Additional note

Team had to travel by jeepney from the Pit Start to the Mabalacat bus station and ride in a marked jeepney while in Albay.

=== Leg 8 (Albay) ===
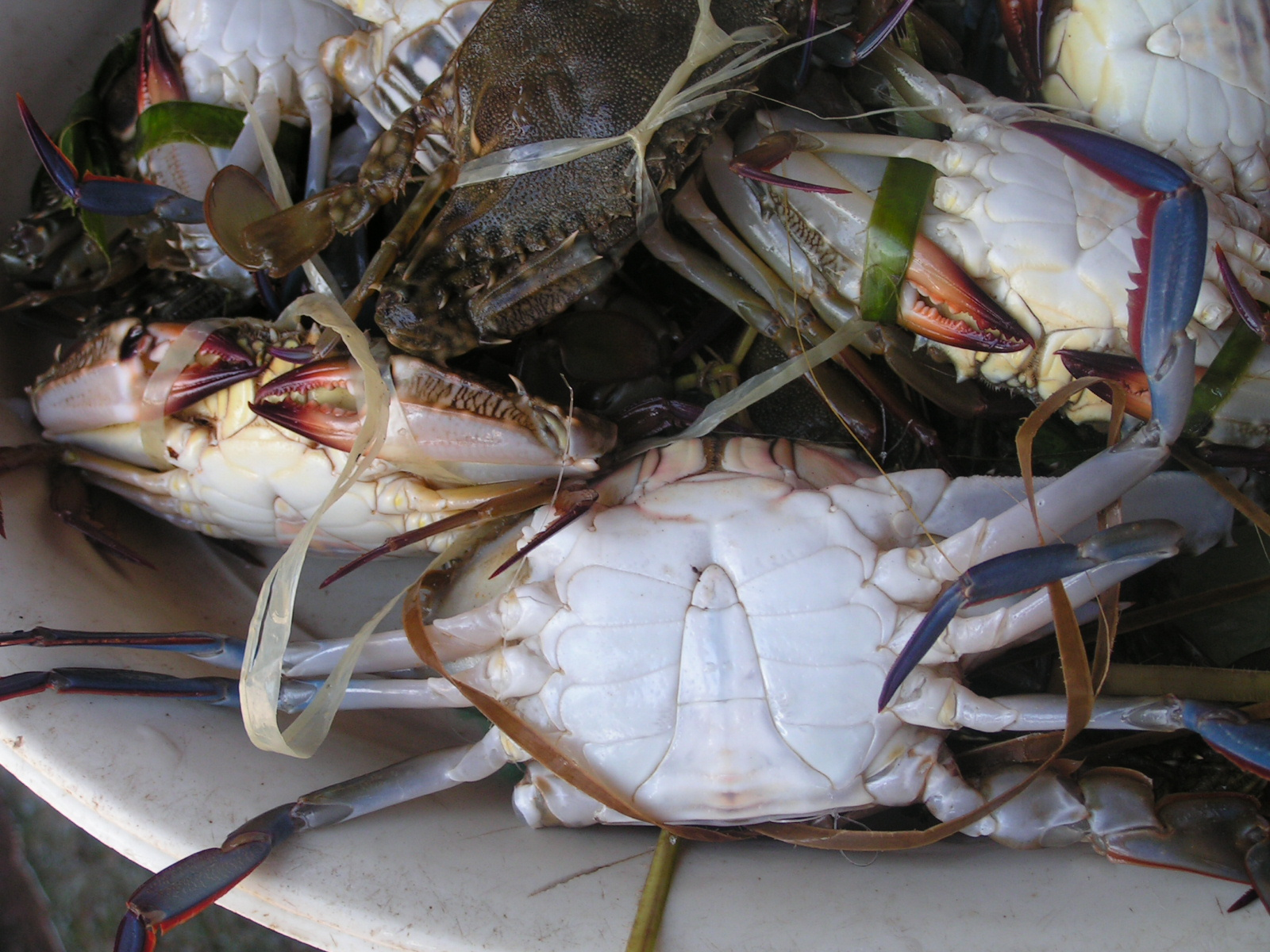
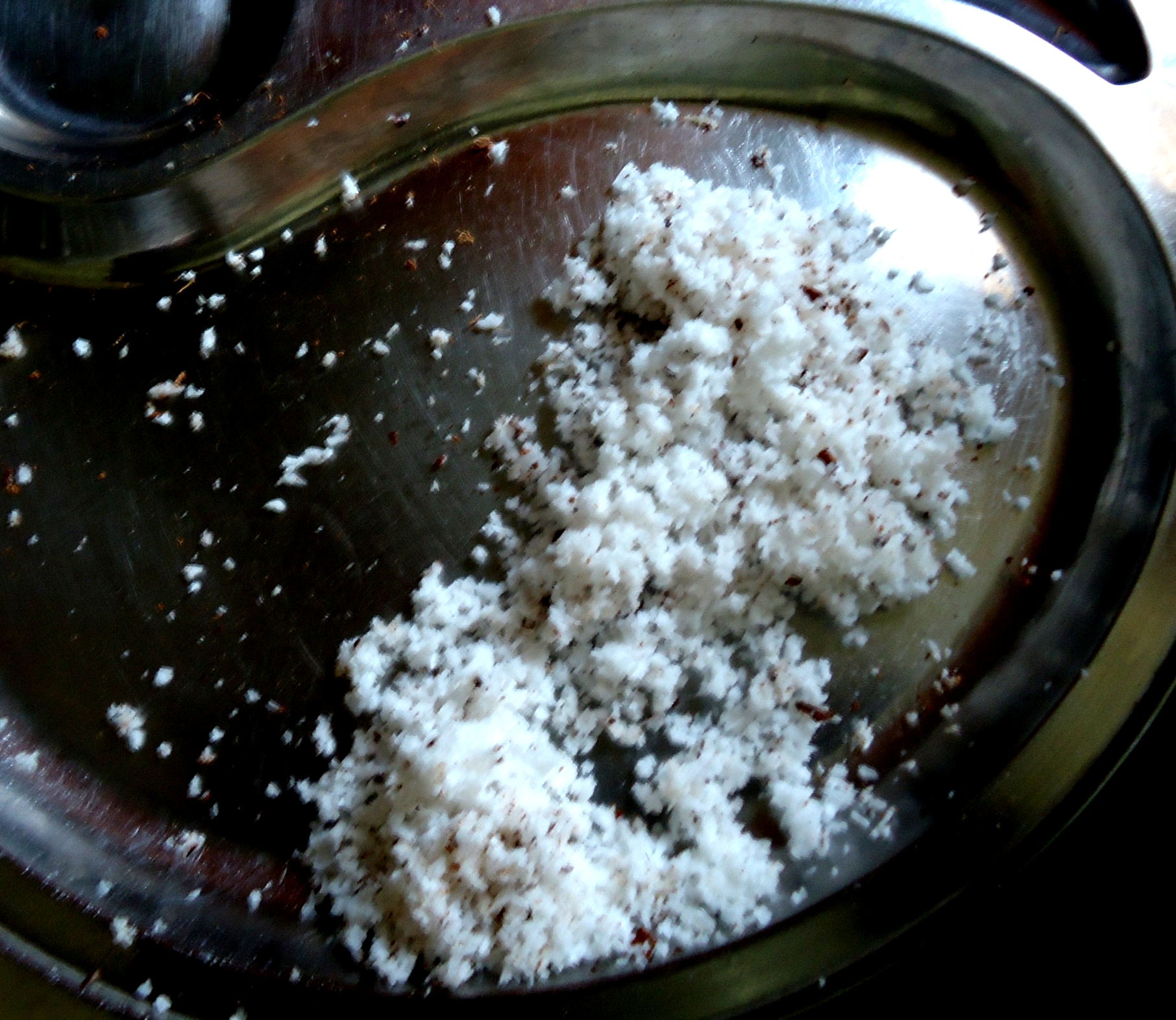
The Detour in Albay had teams choosing between Crab and Coconut. In Crab, teams had to find a basket filled with crabs and deliver it to a fisherman. In Coconut, teams had to scrape out coconut meat and produce coconut milk.

Airdates: November 23–24 & 26, 2012

- Legazpi (Legazpi City Public Market – Lana's Halo-Halo Store and Yanzon Store)
- Bacacay (Barangay Damacan – Crab Farm or Village Hut)
- Bacacay (Sula Port to Cagraray)
- Bacacay (Misibis Bay Resort and Casino)
- Bacacay (Misibis Bay Resort and Casino – Luyang Beach to Mosboron Beach)

This leg's Detour was a choice between Crab or Coconut. In Crab, teams had to find a basket filled with crabs in a muddy swamp and deliver it to a fisherman to receive their next clue. In Coconut, teams had to manually scrape out meat from coconut half shells then squeeze 350 millilitres (12 imp fl oz; 12 US fl oz) of coconut milk from the meat to receive their next clue.

In this leg's Roadblock, one team member had to go to the lobby of the Misibis Bay Resort and Casino and get four cocktail drinks. Using one hand, they had to carry these drinks on a tray while using an electronic key to open the hotel room containing their next clue. If they dropped the drinks, they would have to go back to the lobby and get a new set.

Additional tasks

- At Lana's Halo-Halo Store, both team members had to eat a bowl of halo-halo to reveal a sticker at the bottom of the bowls directing them to Yanzon Store, where they could exchange their empty bowls for their next clue.
- At Luyang Beach, teams had to build a raft from the provided materials and paddle themselves to the Pit Stop at Mosboron Beach.

Additional note

Teams rode in a marked jeepney for the duration of the leg.

=== Leg 9 (Albay → Cebu) ===
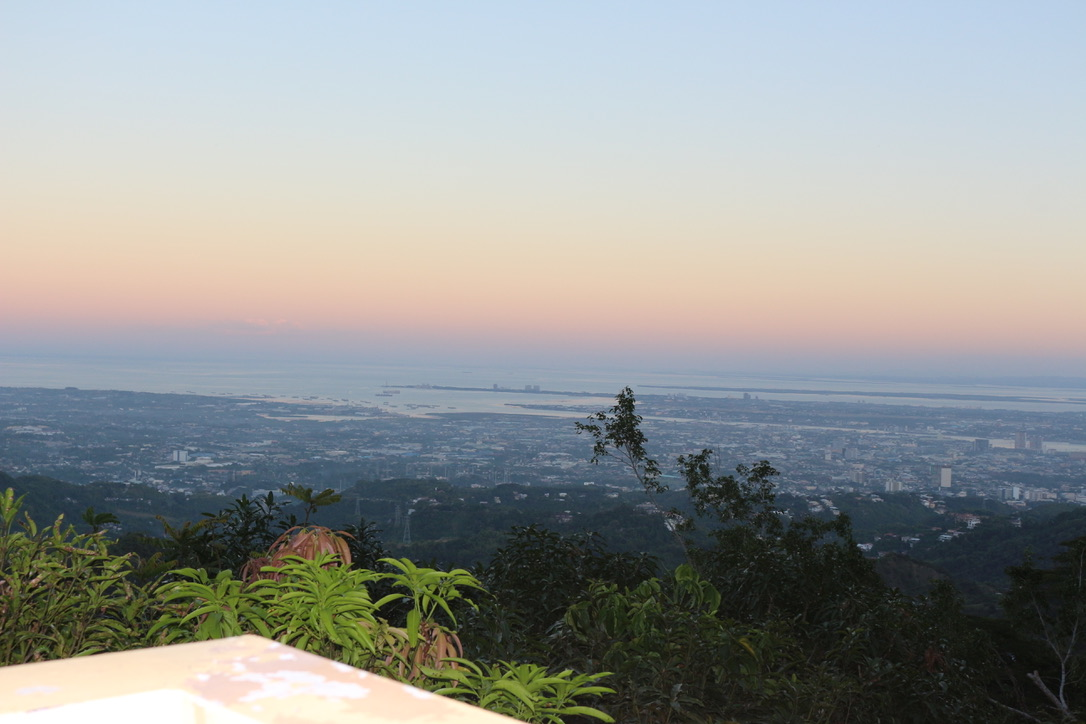
Tops Lookout in Cebu City hosted the ninth Pit Stop.

Airdates: November 27–30, 2012

- Legazpi (Legazpi City Hall) (Pit Start)
- Legazpi (Legazpi Airport) to Cebu City, Cebu (Mactan–Cebu International Airport)
- Lapu-Lapu (Mactan Shrine)
- Lapu-Lapu (Shangri-La Mactan Island Resort & Spa – Vanafi)
- Cebu City (Tabo-an Market – Tres de Abril Street or Jiji Ulingan)
- Mandaue (Parkmall – Conrado D. Seno Street)
- Mandaue (Parkmall – Coco Hair Studio)
- Cebu City (Crown Regency Hotel and Towers – Fuente Tower II)
- Cebu City (Tops Lookout)

This leg's Detour was a choice between Saang (Shellfish) or Uling (Charcoal). In Saang, teams had to crack open and skewer 35 conch and sell them, for no less than 15 pesos per stick, until they earned 525 pesos to receive their next clue. In Uling, teams had to find a marked stall and pack charcoal into 50 plastic bags to the satisfaction of the vendor to receive their next clue.

In this leg's Roadblock, one team member had to climb a rock wall then climb a ladder to the top most portion of the tower to retrieve their next clue. While performing the Roadblock, the team member climbing encountered an Anonymous Yield halfway up the tower and had to decide without their partner if they wanted to use the Yield before continuing the Roadblock.

Additional tasks

- At Vanafi, teams had to arrange jewelry from the least expensive to the most expensive to receive their next clue.
- At Conrado D. Seno Street, teams encountered an Intersection. After pairing up, the Intersected teams had to convince two people to allow them to wash, blow dry and style their hair at Coco Hair Studio to the satisfaction of a hairdresser to receive their next clue. After this task, teams were no longer Intersected.

=== Leg 10 (Cebu → Aklan) ===
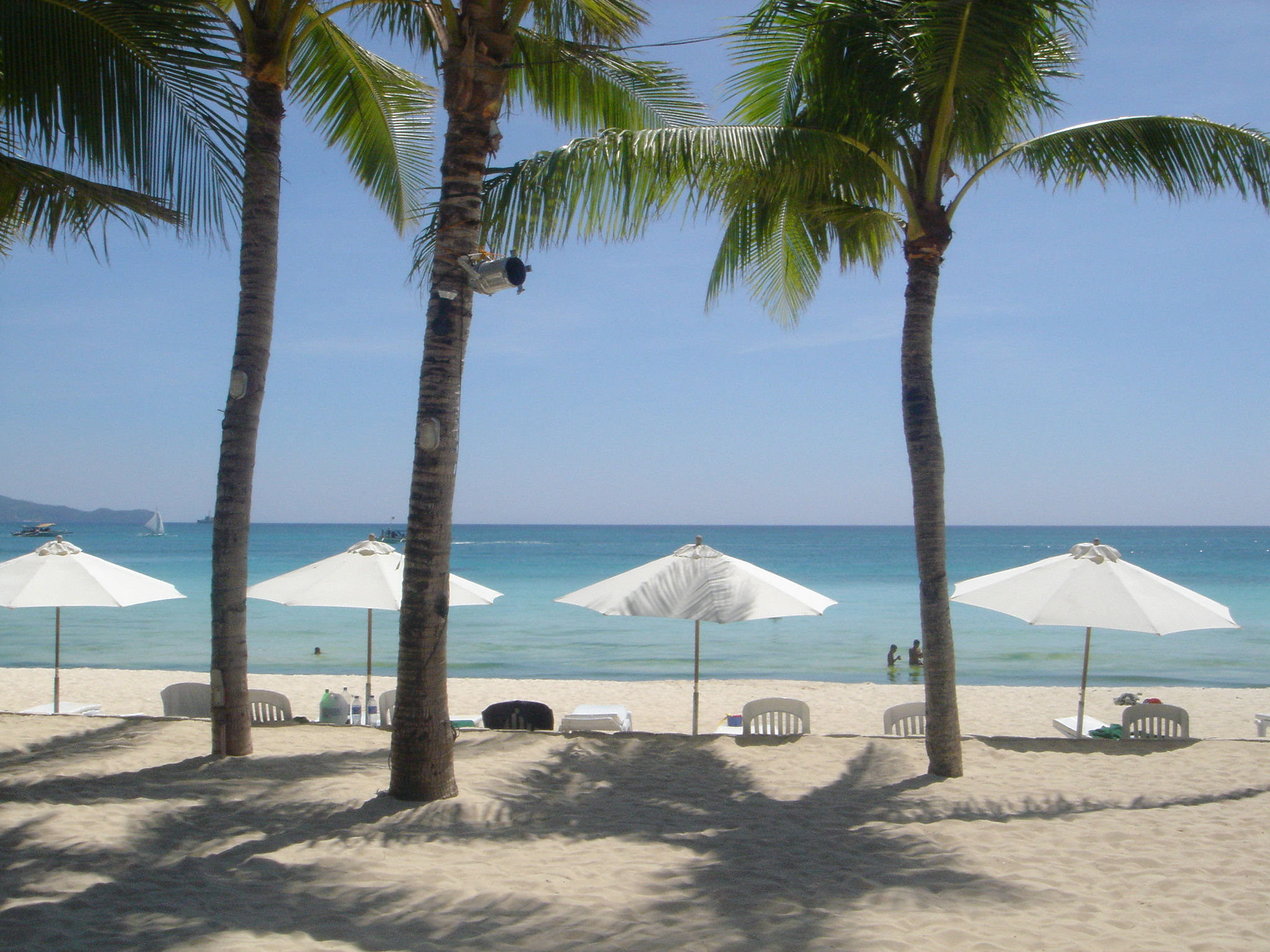
The island of Boracay in Malay, Aklan was the location of the tenth leg.

Airdates: December 1 & 3, 2012 (Note: Two episodes aired back-to-back on December 1.)

- Cebu City (Cebu Provincial Capitol) (Pit Start)
- Cebu City (Mactan–Cebu International Airport) to Malay, Aklan (Godofredo P. Ramos Airport)
- Malay (Caticlan Tabon Boat Terminal) to Boracay (Boracay Jetty Port)
- Boracay (White Beach – Willy's Rock)
  - Boracay (Bolabog Road Barangay Boat Station 1 – R.P. Barber)
- Boracay (White Beach)
- Boracay (White Beach – Sprite Beach Party)
- Boracay (Puka Shell Beach)
- Boracay (Ilig Iligan Beach)

In this season's only Fast Forward, one team had to proceed to R.P. Barber, where they learned that both team members had to have their heads shaved to win the Fast Forward award.

This leg's Detour was a choice between Lulubog (To Sink) or Lilitaw (To Float). In Lulubog, teams had to dive using marine walk helmets and remove two tubes from an underwater rope maze without untying the ropes to receive their next clue. In Lilitaw, teams had to sail a double outrigger canoe sail boat called a paraw to three orange buoys and retrieve a coconut from each buoy to receive their next clue.

In this leg's Roadblock, one team member had to dig in a marked area on Puka Shell Beach to find a buried clue.

Additional task

At the Sprite beach party, teams had to search under the caps of Sprite bottles for one with the logo of The Amazing Race Philippines to receive their next clue. If the bottle did not have the logo, teams had to drink the contents of the bottle before they could try again.

=== Leg 11 (Aklan → Metro Manila → Palawan) ===
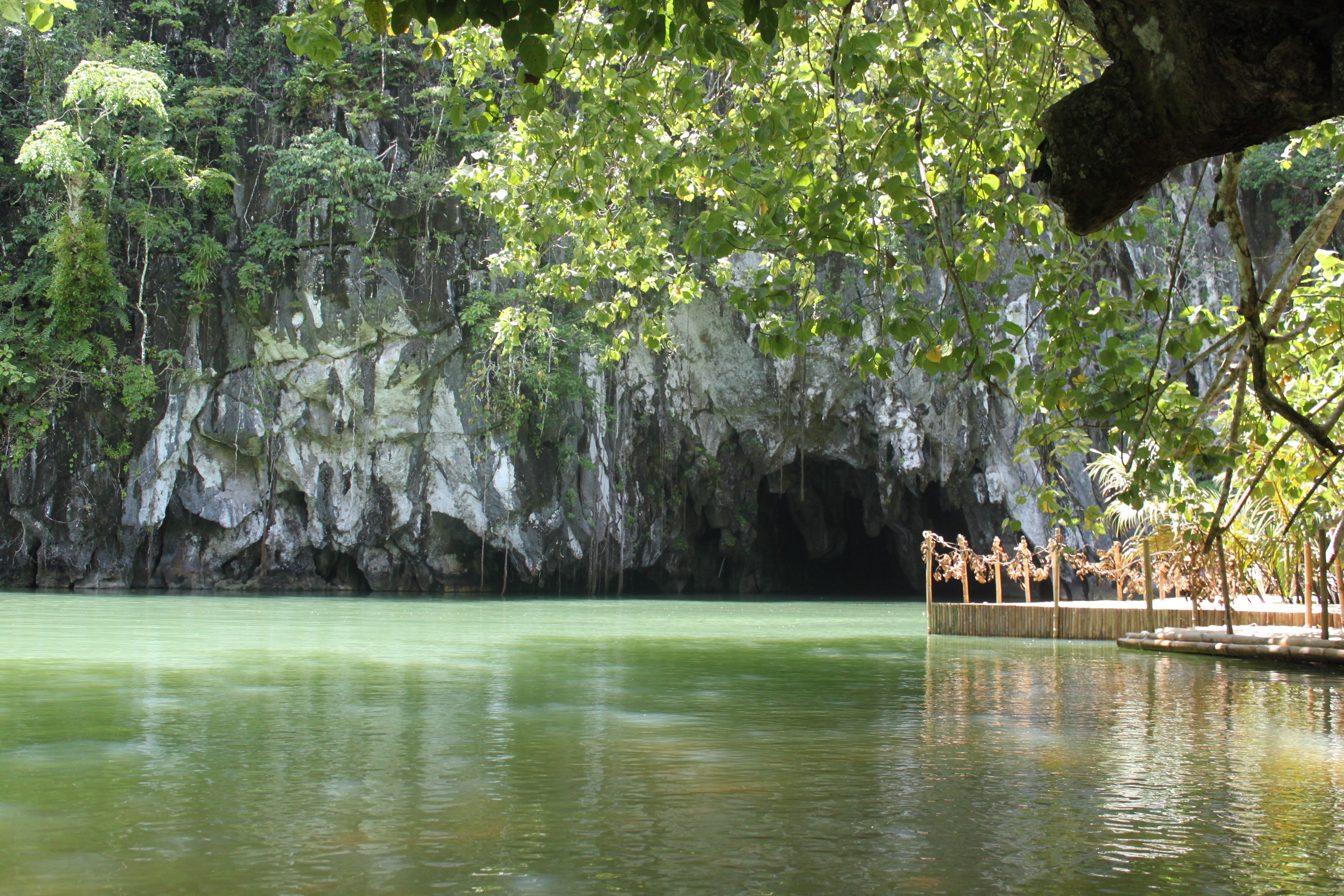
In this leg, the teams visited Puerto Princesa Subterranean River in Palawan where they had to search the cave walls for a date.

Airdates: December 4–8, 2012

- Boracay (Boracay Jetty Port) to Malay (Caticlan Tabon Boat Terminal)
- Malay (Godofredo P. Ramos Airport) to Manila, Metro Manila (Ninoy Aquino International Airport)
- Taguig (Marajo Tower – Brother Industries Philippines Showroom)
- Manila (Ninoy Aquino International Airport) to Puerto Princesa, Palawan (Puerto Princesa International Airport)
- Puerto Princesa (Sabang Beach) (Overnight Rest)
- Puerto Princesa (Sabang Wharf to Puerto Princesa Subterranean River)
- Puerto Princesa (Sabang X Zipline)
- Puerto Princesa (Karst Mountain – Elephant Cave)
- Puerto Princesa (Barangay Buenavista – Brgy. Buenavista Elementary School or Buenavista Fisherman's Village)
- Puerto Princesa (Baheli Wharf)

In this leg's Roadblock, one team member had to ride an 800-metre (0.50 mi) long zip line and memorize the color patterns on four boats (Red, Blue, Yellow; Green, Red, Yellow; Yellow, Blue, Red; Blue, Yellow, Green). Once ashore, they had to reconstruct the patterns using colored rectangular boards to receive their next clue.

This leg's Detour was a choice between Swing or Stroke. In Swing, teams had to learn and perform a five-step baton twirling routine with a marching band at Brgy. Buenavista Elementary School to receive their next clue. The first team to finish this task would donate ₱100,000 worth of printers to the school courtesy of Brother Industries Philippines. In Stroke, teams had to refurbish a boat by painting and fixing dents on it to receive their next clue.

Additional tasks

- At the Brother Industries showroom in Marajo Tower, teams had to input the year women were allowed to vote in the Philippines into a printer (1937 → 1-9-3-7) so that it would print out a page saying "Correct" with The Amazing Race Philippines logo on the back, which they could exchange for their next clue.
- At Sabang Beach, teams had to assemble a tent that they would be sleeping in for the night to the satisfaction of a ranger to receive their next clue and a departure time at 6:50 a.m., 7:00 a.m., 7:10 a.m., or 7:20 a.m. Teams would then retrieve their next clue at Sabang Wharf in the morning.
- At the Puerto Princesa Subterranean River, teams had to enter the river, photograph the date of the first visit of Lt. H.G. Warwick to the Subterranean River (March 18, 1937) and present it to a park ranger to receive their next clue.
- At the Elephant Cave, teams had to crack open coconuts until they could find one with red-colored flesh to receive their next clue.

=== Leg 12 (Palawan) ===
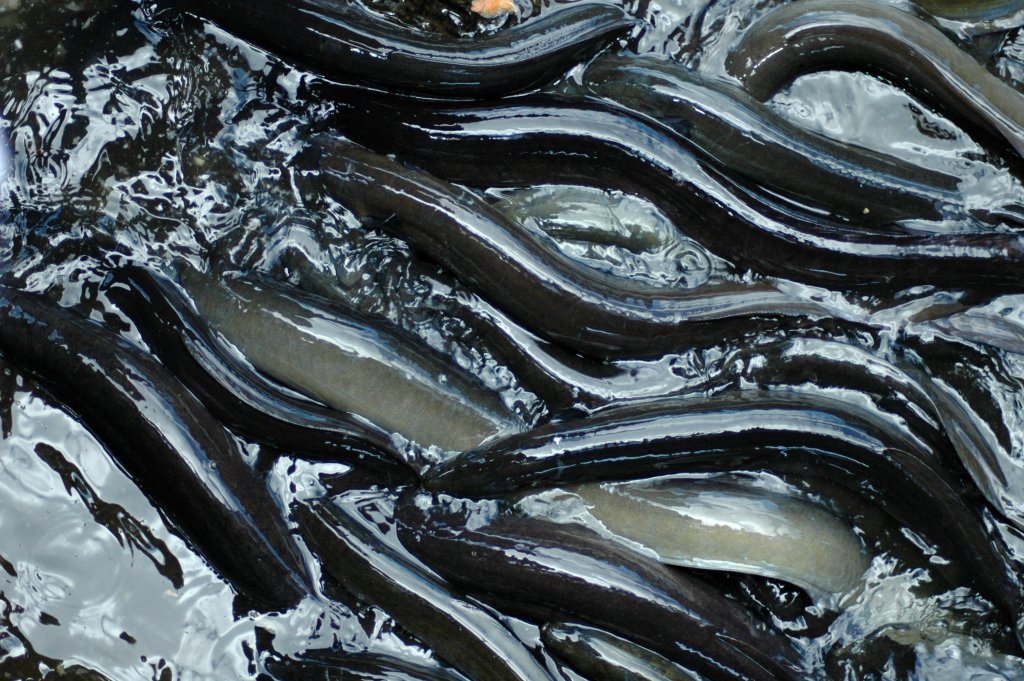
In one of this leg's Detour choices, teams had to deliver several items including eels to a local restaurant.

Airdates: December 8 & 11–13, 2012

- Puerto Princesa (Sabang Wharf) (Pit Start)
- Puerto Princesa (Malvar Street)
- Puerto Princesa (Puerto Princesa Public Market or Puerto Princesa Public Market and JA Seafoods Restaurant)
- Puerto Princesa (Sta. Lourdes Wharf) to Honda Bay (Starfish Island)
- Honda Bay (Pandan Island)
- Honda Bay (Luli Island)

This season's final Detour was a choice between Count or Carry. In Count, teams had to count the number of fish inside a bucket (926), amidst the noisiness of the market vendors, to receive their next clue from the fish vendor. In Carry, teams had to deliver three eels, a tray of eggs, and two blocks of ice from Puerto Princesa Public Market to JA Seafoods Restaurant to receive their next clue from the restaurant owner.

In this leg's Roadblock, teams had to travel by bangka to Starfish Island, where one team member had to search among hundreds of bottles scattered around the shore for one containing their next clue.

Additional tasks

- From Sabang Wharf, teams had to travel by public jeepney to Malvar Street, where teams had to figure out that their next clue was inside a tricycle roving the street with the words "CLUE BOX" painted on the front.
- On Pandan Island, one team member had to answer five questions, and their partner had to match the answers to receive their next clue.

Questions	Answers			
Questions	Fausto & Dayal	LJ & CJ	Marc & Kat	Sheena & Gee
Which team would help you?	Marc & Kat	Marc & Kat	Boom & Cheng	Anton & Armand
Which team would lie to you?	Sheena & Gee	Sheena & Gee	Fausto & Dayal	Fausto & Dayal
Which team has good teamwork?	Marc & Kat	LJ & CJ	Ed & Angel	Anton & Armand
Which team do you dislike?	Sheena & Gee	Sheena & Gee	Dani & Mish	Fausto & Dayal
Which team has bad luck on their side?	Crystel & Mykey	Fausto & Dayal	Crystel & Mykey	Crystel & Mykey

=== Leg 13 (Palawan → Davao del Sur → Davao del Norte) ===
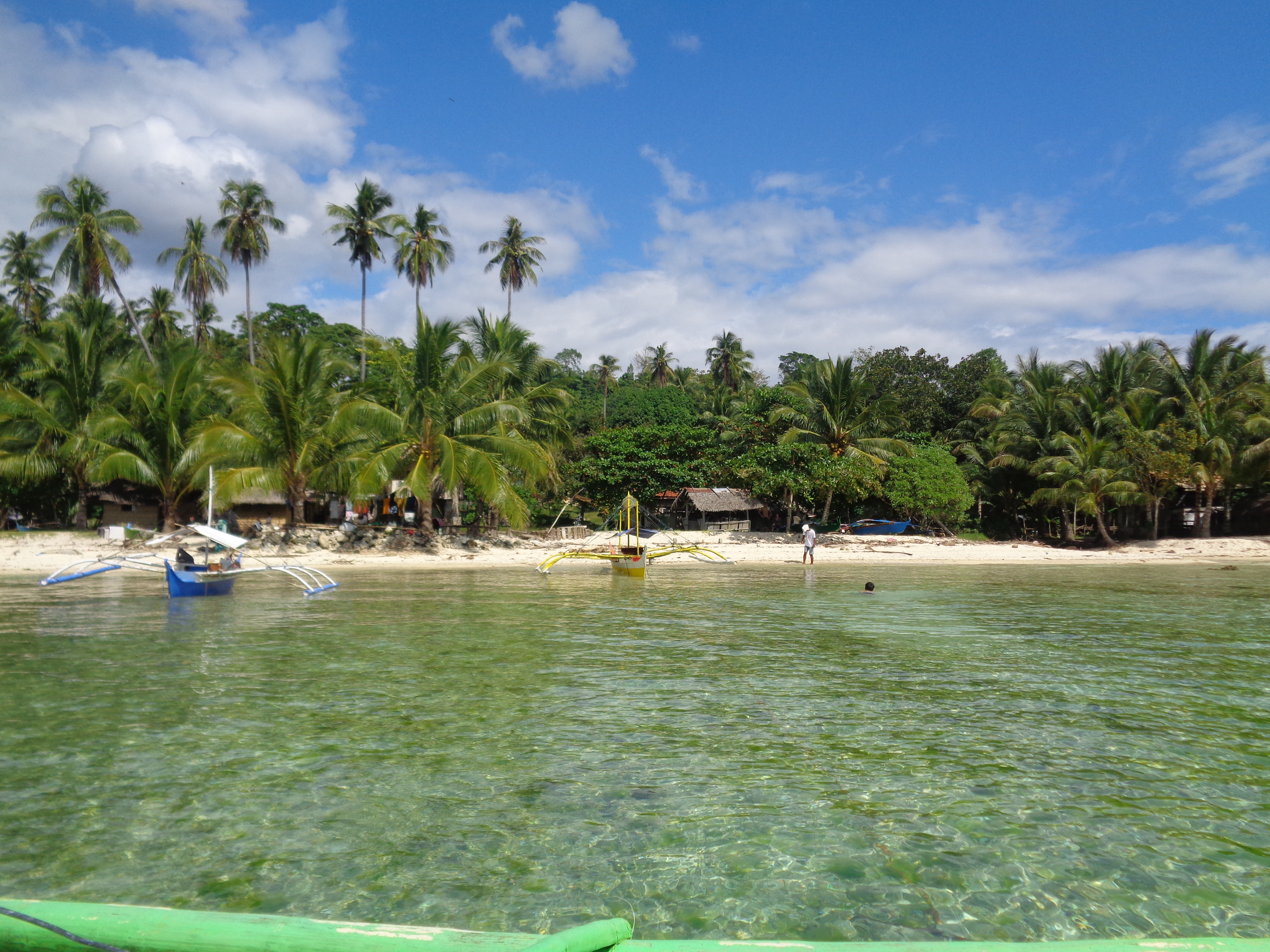
During the final leg, teams visited the island of Samal.

Airdates: December 14–15, 2012 (Note: Two episodes aired back-to-back on December 14 and 15.)

- Puerto Princesa (Sta. Lourdes Wharf) (Pit Start)
- Puerto Princesa (Smart Puerto Princesa and Shinar Travelasia)
- Puerto Princesa (Puerto Princesa International Airport) to Davao, Davao del Sur (Francisco Bangoy International Airport)
- Davao (People's Park)
- Davao (GAP Farm)
- Davao (Davao Crocodile Park)
- Davao (Moto-X Davao)
- Davao (Sasa Ferry Terminal) to Samal, Davao del Norte (Babak Ferry Terminal)
- Samal (Ana Marina Resort)
- Buenavista Island (Santa Isla)
- Buenavista Island (Bountiful Cove)

In this leg's first Roadblock, one team member had to chronologically arrange 12 numbered flags, which represent the 12 legs, by placing them beside wood statues that have engravings of the regions of the Philippines to receive their next clue.

In this season's final Roadblock, one team member had to ride a motorcycle 20 laps around a motocross course to receive their next clue.

Additional tasks

- At Smart Puerto Princesa, one team member had to use a smartphone provided by Smart to describe their next destination (Davao) without using the words listed on a tablet computer to their partner at Shinar Travelasia, who had to name the city, to receive their next clue.
- At People's Park, teams had to find their next clue, which was transcribed on the book held by a statue of a woman.
- At Davao Crocodile Park, both team members had to walk across a tightrope over a crocodile pen while supporting each other to receive their next clue.
- At Ana Marina Resort, teams had to drive a Jet Ski to a line of buoys and retrieve their next clue from the 97th buoy.
- At Santa Isla, teams had to unearth the correct treasure chest, among several buried in the shore, with their final clue.

Additional notes

- During the Pit Stop, teams had to record a video message for their loved ones back home using a provided Canon HD camera.
- At the time of the first Roadblock (the 13th Roadblock), the team member that had performed a total of seven Roadblocks was prohibited to do the task with their partner required to perform said task. For the second Roadblock, the Roadblock cap was reset to zero allowing either team member to perform the task.
- Teams were prohibited to travel from Sta. Ana Wharf en route to Samal Island.

== Television ratings ==
Television ratings for the first season of The Amazing Race Philippines on TV5 are based from two firms, AGB Nielsen and Kantar Media - TNS. AGB Nielsen mostly covers Mega Manila, while Kantar Media - TNS covers mostly the Philippines.

Week	Television Ratings, Timeslot & Primetime Rankings of The Amazing Race Philippines (season 1)^{1}							Media	Source
Week	Daily Episodes (Weekdays at 9:00 p.m.; Saturdays at 8:30 p.m.)						Marathon Episodes (Sundays at 9:30 p.m.)	Media	Source
Week	Monday	Tuesday	Wednesday	Thursday	Friday	Saturday	Sunday	Media	Source
1	5.1%; #3, < #10 (October 29, 2012)	5.2%; #3, < #10 (October 30, 2012)	5.0%; #3, < #10 (October 31, 2012)	5.0%; #3, < #10 (November 1, 2012)	6.1%; #3, < #10 (November 2, 2012)	5.5%; #3, < #10 (November 3, 2012)	5.3%; #4, < #10 (November 4, 2012)	AGB Nielsen	
1	3.6%; #3, < #10 (October 29, 2012)	3.8%; #4, < #10 (October 30, 2012)	4.1%; #4, < #10 (October 31, 2012)	3.2%; #3, < #10 (November 1, 2012)	3.5%; #3, < #10 (November 2, 2012)	3.1%; #3, < #10 (November 3, 2012)	2.8%; #4, < #10 (November 4, 2012)	Kantar Media - TNS	
2	6.7%; #3, < #10 (November 5, 2012)	5.7%; #3, < #10 (November 6, 2012)	6.0%; #3, < #10 (November 7, 2012)	6.6%; #3, < #10 (November 8, 2012)	6.8%; #3, < #10 (November 9, 2012)	6.1%; #3, < #10 (November 10, 2012)	4.9%; #4, < #10 (November 11, 2012)	AGB Nielsen	
2	4.1%; #3, < #10 (November 5, 2012)	4.0%; #3, < #10 (November 6, 2012)	4.0%; #3, < #10 (November 7, 2012)	4.1%; #3, < #10 (November 8, 2012)	4.0%; #3, < #10 (November 9, 2012)	3.0%; #3, < #10 (November 10, 2012)	2.5%; #3, < #10 (November 11, 2012)	Kantar Media - TNS	
3	7.2%; #3, < #10 (November 12, 2012)	7.3%; #3, < #10 (November 13, 2012)	6.7%; #3, < #10 (November 14, 2012)	7.4%; #3, < #10 (November 15, 2012)	6.1%; #3, < #10 (November 16, 2012)	7.4%; #3, < #10 (November 17, 2012)	5.7%; #4, < #10 (November 18, 2012)	AGB Nielsen	
3	3.5%; #3, < #10 (November 12, 2012)	N/A; N/A, < #10 (November 13, 2012)	3.7%; #4, < #10 (November 14, 2012)	4.2%; #3, < #10 (November 15, 2012)	4.0%; #3, < #10 (November 16, 2012)	3.4%; #4, < #10 (November 17, 2012)	2.5%; #5, < #10 (November 18, 2012)	Kantar Media - TNS	
4	7.0%; #3, < #10 (November 19, 2012)	N/A; N/A, < #10 (November 20, 2012)	N/A; N/A, N/A (November 21, 2012)	5.9%; #3, < #10 (November 22, 2012)	9.9%; #3, < #10 (November 23, 2012)	7.0%; #4, < #10 (November 24, 2012)	6.2%; #2, < #10 (November 25, 2012)	AGB Nielsen	
4	4.5%; #3, < #10 (November 19, 2012)	4.6%; #3, < #10 (November 20, 2012)	4.2%; #3, < #10 (November 21, 2012)	3.6%; #3, < #10 (November 22, 2012)	5.4%; #3, < #10 (November 23, 2012)	3.3%; #4, < #10 (November 24, 2012)	2.9%; #4, < #10 (November 25, 2012)	Kantar Media - TNS	
5	7.2%; #3, < #10 (November 26, 2012)	6.7%; #3, < #10 (November 27, 2012)	7.7%; #3, < #10 (November 28, 2012)	8.7%; #3, < #10 (November 29, 2012)	7.6%; #3, < #10 (November 30, 2012)	9.8%; #3, < #10 (December 1, 2012)^{2}	6.9%; #4, < #10 (December 2, 2012)	AGB Nielsen	
5	4.1%; #4, < #10 (November 26, 2012)	3.9%; #3, < #10 (November 27, 2012)	5.0%; #3, < #10 (November 28, 2012)	4.9%; #4, < #10 (November 29, 2012)	4.8%; #3, < #10 (November 30, 2012)	4.8%; #3, < #10 (December 1, 2012)^{2}	2.9%; #3, < #10 (December 2, 2012)	Kantar Media - TNS	
6	8.7%; #3, < #10 (December 3, 2012)	7.8%; #3, < #10 (December 4, 2012)	7.7%; #3, < #10 (December 5, 2012)	7.7%; #3, < #10 (December 6, 2012)	9.7%; #3, < #10 (December 7, 2012)	8.6%; #3, < #10 (December 8, 2012)^{2}	6.8%; #3, < #10 (December 9, 2012)	AGB Nielsen	
6	4.6%; #3, < #10 (December 3, 2012)	3.6%; #3, < #10 (December 4, 2012)	4.5%; #4, < #10 (December 5, 2012)	4.2%; #3, < #10 (December 6, 2012)	5.5%; #3, < #10 (December 7, 2012)	4.3%; #3, < #10 (December 8, 2012)^{2}	2.9%; #3, < #10 (December 9, 2012)	Kantar Media - TNS	
7	Show Preempted (December 10, 2012)^{3}	8.4%; #3, < #10 (December 11, 2012)	8.0%; #3, < #10 (December 12, 2012)	6.8%; #3, < #10 (December 13, 2012)	N/A; N/A, N/A (December 14, 2012)^{2}	N/A; N/A, N/A (December 15, 2012)^{2}	N/A; N/A, N/A (December 16, 2012)	AGB Nielsen	
7	Show Preempted (December 10, 2012)^{3}	4.8%; #4, < #10 (December 11, 2012)	4.7%; #3, < #10 (December 12, 2012)	4.6%; #4, < #10 (December 13, 2012)	5.1%; #3, N/A (December 14, 2012)^{2}	5.8%; #4, N/A (December 15, 2012)^{2}	2.4%; #4, N/A (December 16, 2012)	Kantar Media - TNS	

1. Note that the table information are shown as, for example, "4.5%; #3, < #10" where "4.5%" is the television rating, "#3" is the timeslot ranking, and "< #10" is the primetime ranking.
2. ^^{a} ^{b} ^{c} ^{d} ^{e} ^{f} On December 1, 8, 14 & 15, 2012, TV5 aired back-to-back episodes.
3. No episode aired on December 10 to make way for the channel's telethon for Typhoon Pablo's victims.
