= Lizardo =

Lizardo may refer to:

- Lizardo (name), a name of Spanish and Portuguese origin
- Lizardo Bus Lines, a company in the Philippines
- Emilio Lizardo, a character in the 1984 film The Adventures of Buckaroo Banzai Across the 8th Dimension
- Lizardo (Pokémon), the original Japanese name for Charmeleon, a fictional species of Pokémon

== See also ==
- Antón Lizardo, Veracruz, Mexico
