= Armand del Rosario =

American-Filipino footballer

Armand Del Rosario
Personal information
- Full name: Mariano Armand del Rosario
- Date of birth: 8 December 1978 (age 47)
- Place of birth: San Francisco, California, United States
- Height: 1.69 m (5 ft 7 in)
- Position: Defender

Team information
- Current team: Loyola
- Number: 16

Senior career*
Years	Team	Apps	(Gls)
2000–2013	Kaya		
2013–	Loyola		

International career^{‡}
2007	Philippines		
- * Club domestic league appearances and goals ‡ National team caps and goals as of 14 August 2013

Mariano Armand del Rosario (born 8 December 1978), is an American-Filipino footballer who plays as a defender for Loyola in the United Football League.

Del Rosario is the elder brother of former Philippine international footballer Anton del Rosario.

== Personal life ==
Armand is married to Georgia Schulze-Del Rosario and they have four daughters together.

In 2012, Del Rosario competed with his brother Anton on the first season of The Amazing Race Philippines. They were eliminated in Leg 2 after they violated a show rule by making a phone call to their mother and finished in 10th place.

== Honors ==
=== Club ===
Kaya

- United Football League: Runner-up 2011–12

Loyola

- UFL Cup: Third place 2013
