= Hannah Espia =

Filipino director (born 1987)

- Born: Hannah Tabitha Madrazo Espia; May 15, 1987 (age 39)
- Occupation: Director
- Awards: Gawad Urian Award for Best Direction

Hannah Espia (born 15 May 1987) is a Filipina director best known for writing and directing the 2013 independent drama film Transit.

She married film editor Andrej Farba in 2017, and has directed three episodes (2020, 2023) of the series Almost Paradise under the name Hannah Espia-Farbová.
