= Samantha Richelle =

Filipino actress and fashion designer (born 1988)

- Born: Samantha Richelle Bolkiah; 16 December 1988 (age 37); Brunei
- Education: Fashion Institute of Design & Merchandising
- Occupations: Actress, entrepreneur and fashion designer
- Partner: Anton del Rosario
- Parents: Prince Jefri Bolkiah (father); Evangeline Teodoro del Rosario (mother)
- Relatives: Karraminah Clarisse (sister)

Samantha Richelle Bolkiah (born 16 December 1988) is a Brunei-born Filipino actress, entrepreneur, and fashion designer. She is also the daughter of Prince Jefri Bolkiah, the youngest son of Sultan Omar Ali Saifuddien III.

== Acting career ==
In 2020, Richelle debuted as Detective Kai Mendoza in the TV series Almost Paradise. In a YouTube interview with the film critic Manny the Movie Guy, she said, "It was something I was really interested [in doing] because, growing up, I've never seen a show [represent] the Philippines in this light. You get to see the beautiful landscapes and beaches that we have here." She is also scheduled to star in the currently-in-production short film The Cassandra Project, according to her IMDb page, where she has also received many credits for writing and directing.

== Fashion designing ==
Richelle trained at the Fashion Institute of Design & Merchandising in Los Angeles, and has worked as a fashion designer.

== Personal life ==
Richelle is the daughter of Prince Jefri Bolkiah, the brother of Sultan Hassanal Bolkiah, and his non-royal wife, Puan Fatimah binti Abdullah (née Evangeline Teodoro del Rosario). She has a younger sister named Karraminah Clarisse.

Born in Brunei, she attended high school in Los Angeles before moving to London, then returning to Los Angeles, and finally settling in the Philippines, where she currently resides. She frequently attends the Brunei Royal family's functions as well.

Richelle disclosed her interest in tattoo art and the fact that she had at least nine tattoos on her body in 2015. She acknowledges that she has a slight tattoo addiction, but she doesn't regret it because tattoos have become a significant aspect of who she is.

=== Family ===
Richelle got engaged to football player Anton del Rosario in 2016.

=== Sports ===
During Richelle's time in school in the United Kingdom, she engaged in a variety of sports, including rounders, swimming, volleyball, and track.
