= Almost Paradise (TV series) =

American crime drama TV series (2020– )

- Genre: Crime drama
- Created by: Dean Devlin & Gary Rosen
- Starring: Christian Kane; Samantha Richelle; Arthur Acuña; Nonie Buencamino; Ces Quesada
- Theme music composer: Fred Coury
- Countries of origin: United States; Philippines
- Original languages: English; Filipino; Cebuano
- No. of seasons: 2
- No. of episodes: 20

Production
- Executive producers: Carlo L. Katigbak; Cory Vidanes; Laurenti Dyogi; Dean Devlin; Gary Rosen; Marc Roskin; Rachel Olschan-Wilson
- Production locations: Mactan, Cebu, Philippines and New Zealand
- Running time: 45 minutes
- Production companies: Electric Entertainment; ABS-CBN Studios (Season 1); Arcade Film Factory (Season 2)

Original release
- Network: WGN America
- Release: March 30 – June 1, 2020
- Network: Amazon Freevee
- Release: July 21, 2023

Almost Paradise is a crime drama television series created by Dean Devlin and Gary Rosen. Starring Christian Kane, Samantha Richelle, Arthur Acuña, Nonie Buencamino, Ces Quesada, and Sophia Reola, the series follows a former DEA agent-turned American expat in Cebu, Philippines, as he balances his work running a gift shop at a resort hotel in Mactan with assisting the local police department in investigating crimes.

The series premiered March 30, 2020 on WGN America; it was the first American television series to be filmed entirely in the Philippines, with ABS-CBN Studios serving as a co-production partner on the first season. The series was later acquired by Amazon Freevee, who subsequently ordered a second season in February 2022; all ten episodes were released on July 21, 2023. In April 2025, the series was cancelled by Amazon after two seasons, although Devlin states that he intends to shop it to other broadcasters.

== Premise ==
Former DEA agent Alex Walker (Christian Kane), forced into retirement, moves to the island of Mactan in the Philippines. He purchases a gift shop at the Paradise hotel in the hope of managing his stress and high blood pressure, but the criminal activity on the island keep drawing him back into law enforcement. Alex struggles to balance his time running his gift shop, which is worn down and in need of extensive repairs and upgrades, with solving various high-profile crimes that threaten the island and its residents, often working alongside Mactan Police detective Kai Mendoza, her partner Ernesto Alamares, and Chief Ike Ocampo.

== Cast ==
=== Main ===
- Christian Kane as Alex Walker, a former DEA agent who moves to the Philippines following a forced retirement due to medical issues. He buys a gift shop at an upscale resort but also lends his expertise to the Mactan Police Department from time to time.
- Samantha Richelle as Detective Kai Mendoza, a detective with the Mactan Police who often works with Alex. The two often clash over how to handle a case but a deep friendship bordering on attraction develops between the two.
  - AC Bonifacio as teenage Kai.
- Arthur Acuña as Ernesto Alamares, Kai's partner. He, like Kai, is often irritated by Alex's methods but the two develop a deep respect and friendship. He has a very calm demeanor.
- Nonie Buencamino as Ike Ocampo, chief of the Mactan Police Department and Kai and Ernesto's boss. He is quick to take credit with the press for the cases that Alex helps to solve.
- Ces Quesada as Cory Santos (season 1), the manager of the hotel and Alex's de facto landlady as, while Alex owns the gift shop, his utilities come from the resort. She initially acts hostile towards Alex but it is shown that she does have a certain fondness for him.
- Sophia Reola as Rita Cordero, daughter of one of the resort employees. Alex befriends her after her father is murdered. After Alex helps solve the case, he hires Rita to help out at the gift shop.

=== Supporting ===
- Raymond Bagatsing as Detective Cesar Rabara (season 1)
- Angeli Bayani as Dr. Sara Patel
- Zeppi Borromeo as Face Tats
- Elijah Canlas as Luke
- Max Collins as Ann Villegas (season 2)
- Lotlot De Leon as Gloria Bautista
- Will Devaughn as Jimmy Teo
- Annicka Dolonius as Jessa Torres
- Ryan Eigenmann as El Diablo
- Sol Eugenio as Shanghai Triad Henchman
- Ketchup Eusebio as Julio Torres
- Jaime Fabregas as Fr. Christo (season 2)
- Jay Gonzaga as Hotel Clerk
- Zaijian Jaranilla as Teenager
- Michael Roy Jornales as Big Bones
- Boom Labrusca
- Chanel Latorre as Sampaguita
- Guji Lorenzana as Lester Cordero
- Shaina Magdayao as Maria Manalo (season 2)
- Sandino Martin as Kidlat Luzon
- Zsa Zsa Padilla as Gov. Nina Rosales
- Miko Raval as Tongo
- Eric Tai as Stretch
- Jared Turner as Todd Carpenter
- Nikki Valdez as Pilar Cordero
- Richard Yap

== Episodes ==
=== Series overview ===
Season	Episodes	Originally released		
Season	Episodes	First released	Last released	Network
1	10	March 30, 2020	June 1, 2020	WGN America
2	10	July 21, 2023		Amazon Freevee

=== Season 1 (2020) ===
No.	Title	Directed by	Written by	Original release date	U.S. viewers (millions)
1	"Finding Mabuhay"	Marc Roskin	Dean Devlin & Gary Rosen	March 30, 2020	0.220
After being betrayed by his ex-partner, ex-DEA agent Alex Walker moves to an island in the Philippines for his health. Despite his doctor's orders, he falls back into his undercover ways to help the local police with a drug sting operation.
2	"It's Personal"	Marc Roskin	Dean Devlin	April 6, 2020	0.263
The body of Ernesto's friend washes up on shore. Alex goes undercover with Kai to catch smugglers while Ernesto tracks down the murderer.
3	"Reef Eel Soup for the Soul"	Francis Dela Torre	Ty Freer & Nick Keetch	April 13, 2020	0.188
Alex goes undercover to stop mobsters from shaking down local street food vendors and discovers that the situation is far worse than he expected.
4	"Pistol Whip"	Dan Villegas	Calvin Sloan	April 20, 2020	0.226
A reality TV show crew arrives to explore sunken World War II battlegrounds and Alex gets involved in an illicit diving operation.
5	"Unbecalming"	Milan Todorovic	Kerry Glover	April 27, 2020	0.207
Alex has to find a way to help his friends as well as a US State Department bureaucrat there to work with an arms dealer when a typhoon hits the islands and the arms dealer's men---who infiltrated as a rowdy sports team arrested for disorderly conduct---take them hostage.
6	"Rise of the Kalangay"	Hannah Espia-Farbova	Sean Presant	May 4, 2020	0.198
Alex works to solve a murder before a celebrated detective does, but things tie back to the murder of Kai's mother, fifteen years earlier.
7	"Uncle Danny"	Francis Dela Torre	Gary Rosen	May 11, 2020	0.227
Uncle Danny, Alex's con-artist relative, comes to the island and Alex is caught between protecting Danny from the police and mafia... and protecting the island from his uncle.
8	"Lone Wolf"	Irene Emma Villamore	Ty Freer & Nick Keetch	May 18, 2020	0.259
When Alex' favourite country singer comes to town, Alex takes a job protecting him. The singer is kidnapped and Alex has to figure out who is behind the crime.
9	"A Wedding to Die For"	Hannah Espia-Farbova	Calvin Sloan	May 25, 2020	0.210
Kai goes undercover at a triad boss wedding. Alex gets dragged into things when a wedding party member is murdered.
10	"Something Walker This Way Comes"	Dean Devlin	Sean Presant	June 1, 2020	0.249
Alex's daughter and old partner both show up on the island, and Alex must protect his daughter from his ex-partner.

=== Season 2 (2023) ===
No. overall	No. in season	Title	Directed by	Written by	Original release date
11	1	"The Magellan Cross"	Dean Devlin	Dean Devlin & Gary Rosen	July 21, 2023
When a local priest is murdered over a long-lost ancient cross, Alex, Kai and Ernesto must solve the priest's murder.
12	2	"Badminton"	Gary L. Camp	Marco Schnabel	July 21, 2023
When Alex's friend from the local gym is found murdered, Alex investigates and discover that his friend was involved in an underground badminton competition. Alex and Ernesto must go undercover as badminton players to solve the murder.
13	3	"A Fisherfolk Tale"	Dan Villegas	Calvin Sloan	July 21, 2023
Alex befriends a boat mechanic who was wrongfully accused of murder in a remote fishing village.
14	4	"Bahala Na"	Dan Villegas	Calvin Sloan	July 21, 2023
Alex temporarily moves in with Ernesto and is drawn into a generation-spanning family drama.
15	5	"Deus Ex-Wife Machina"	Francis dela Torre	Sean Presant	July 21, 2023
Alex's ex-wife shows up with her new fiancé, asking Alex to sign her divorce papers---which leads to the fiancé's kidnapping by a crime lord whose hired hands mistake him for Alex.
16	6	"Ghost Month"	Irene Villamor	James Wong	July 21, 2023
During the traditional "Ghost Month" in the Philippines, Alex is seemingly visited by the spirit of a dead man who was wrongfully accused of a crime and seeks justice.
17	7	"All In"	Irene Villamor	Kristen Cloke, Glen Morgan	July 21, 2023
Before the grand opening of Mactan's new resort casino, owned by the Villegas family, Ann Villegas recruits Alex to test the casino's security system.
18	8	"Uncoupled"	Hannah Espia	Kerry Glover	July 21, 2023
Kai and Alex go undercover at a self-help retreat in order to extract a naïve young woman from what is really a cult.
19	9	"Old Times"	Marc Roskin	Calvin Sloan	July 21, 2023
When Alex becomes entangled in a homicide investigation, he is forced to befriend an older couple with peculiar personality traits.
20	10	"Brigade"	Francis dela Torre	Sean Presant	July 21, 2023
Alex goes undercover as a prisoner and, with the help of Kai and Ernesto, figures out how The Waterboarder has been running his criminal empire from behind bars.

== Production ==
Almost Paradise was the first American television series to be filmed entirely in the Philippines; creator Dean Devlin stated that the series was inspired by a local news story he saw while on a honeymoon in Hawaii, but felt it would be more "authentic" to set it in the Philippines due to his heritage. He aimed to avoid local issues such as Filipino politics and poverty, explaining that "to be able to bring things from the culture — the looks, the costumes, the traditions — and put that seamlessly in a very American show, one of the goals here is not to say that Filipinos are the other. The goal is to say Filipinos are us and we're all part of the same beautiful community."

The series received a 10-episode order from WGN America in April 2019. Production for season 1 began at Bigfoot Studios in Cebu in November 2019, as a co-production with ABS-CBN Studios. Filming wrapped only 18 hours before COVID-19 pandemic travel restrictions took effect in the country—a circumstance that Devlin compared to "trying to get the last helicopter out" during the fall of Saigon.

In June 2020, amid plans for it to be converted to a cable news channel, Devlin revealed that WGN America had not renewed the series. However, he also stated that Electric Entertainment was nearing an agreement with an unspecified streaming service to pick up the first season, and gauge interest in ordering a second season. On January 19, 2021, Amazon announced that it had acquired the first season of Almost Paradise, and that it would be added to its free ad-supported streaming television (FAST) platform IMDb TV (now Amazon Freevee) beginning February 1. On February 8, 2022, Amazon announced that it had ordered a second season. ABS-CBN was replaced as production partner by Arcade Film Factory.

Producer Francis dela Torre stated that although Amazon was interested in renewing Almost Paradise for a third season, the series could not continue production in the Philippines due to high production costs and other "inefficiencies", which had caused season 2 to go over its budget. He cited the higher fees for location filming, equipment, and crews, and tax rebates for international co-productions being capped at US$200,000 (in contrast to other countries in Southeast Asia such as Thailand, where these are uncapped); US$8 million had been spent on the local economy during the production of season 1.

On April 5, 2025, it was reported that Amazon had cancelled Almost Paradise after two seasons; Devlin stated that he was planning to shop the series to other outlets, adding that "I've never had a show that was this successful and yet couldn't stay at the same place more than one season."

== Release ==
On January 19, 2020, the first trailer was released along with the announcement that the series would premiere on March 30, 2020.

In the Philippines, the series aired in a Filipino dub via Kapamilya Channel's Yes Weekend Sunday primetime block, Kapamilya Online Live and A2Z from March 21 to May 23, 2021, replacing Pinoy Big Brother: Connect and was replaced by the first season of He's Into Her. On April 9, 2021, the original version was released on iWantTFC. The series re-aired the dubbed Season 1 from January 7 to February 5, 2023 replacing Maalaala Mo Kaya and Click, Like, Share.

On February 8, 2022, Amazon announced that it had ordered a second season, with all ten episodes premiering on Amazon Freevee on July 21, 2023.
