= Lizardo (name) =

Lizardo is a name of Spanish and Portuguese origin.

== People with the given name ==
- Lizardo Alzamora Porras (born 1928), Peruvian politician
- Lizardo García (1844–1937), President of Ecuador
- Lizardo Garrido (born 1957), Chilean footballer
- Lizardo Montero Flores (1832–1905), Peruvian politician
- Lizardo Rodríguez Nue (fl. 1910–1930), Peruvian footballer

== People with the surname ==
- Cristina Lizardo (born 1959), Dominican politician and academic
- Japoy Lizardo (born 1986), Filipino taekwondo practitioner, actor, and model
- Omar Lizardo (born c. 1974), American sociologist
- Tania Lizardo (born 1989), Mexican actress

== See also ==
- Elizondo (disambiguation)
- Lisardo (born 1970), Spanish actor and singer
- Lizardo (disambiguation)
