= Anton del Rosario =

Filipino footballer (born 1981)

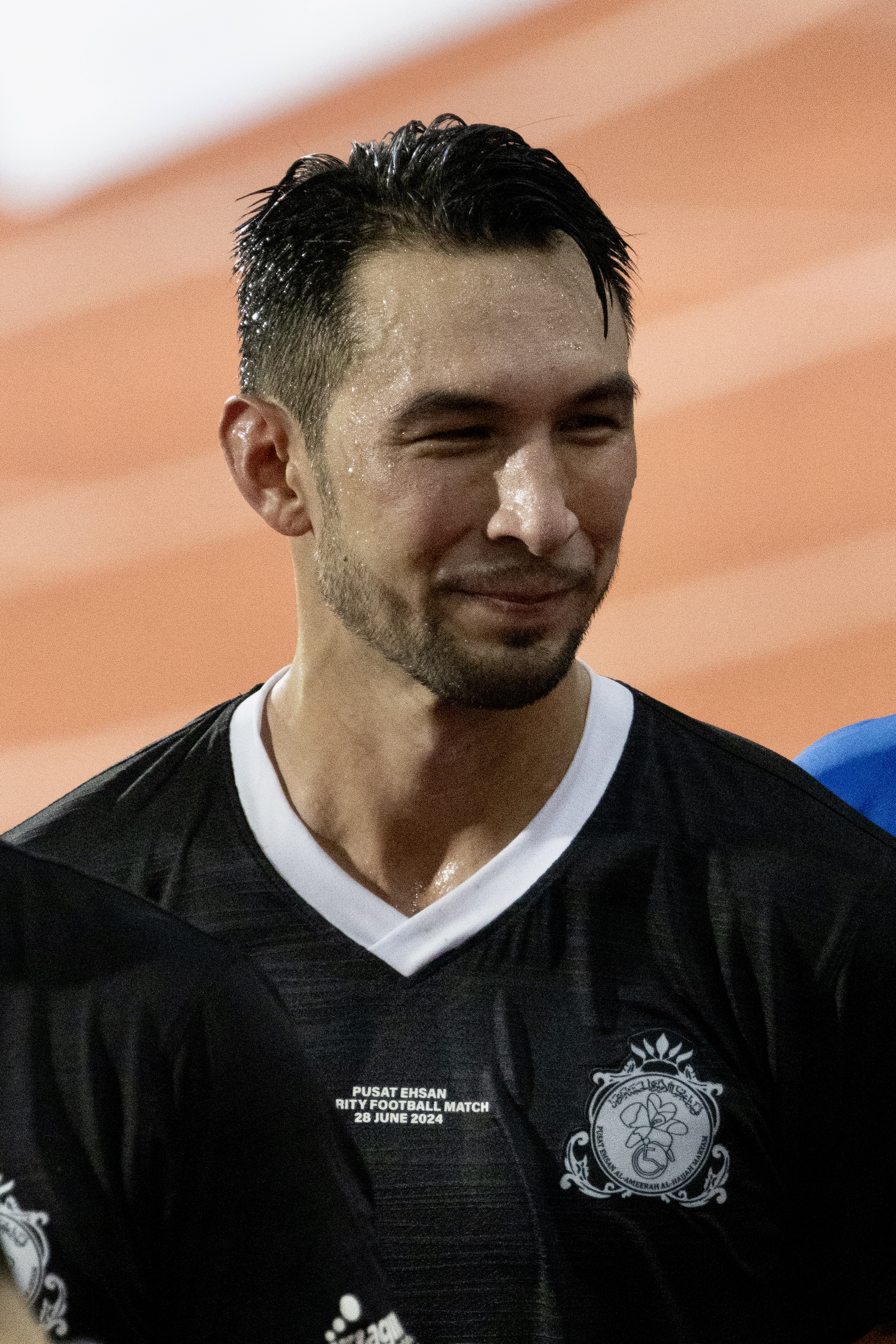
- Del Rosario in 2024

Personal information
- Full name: Anton Edward Quimson del Rosario
- Date of birth: 23 December 1981 (age 44)
- Place of birth: San Francisco, California, U.S.
- Height: 1.80 m (5 ft 11 in)
- Position: Defender

College career
Years	Team	Apps	(Gls)
2001–2003	Skyline Trojans		
2005–2007	NDNU Argonauts		

Senior career*
Years	Team	Apps	(Gls)
1999–2014	Kaya	47	(4)
2014–2017	Loyola	19	(0)
2017	Ilocos United		
2018	Global Cebu		
2020–2025	Maharlika Manila	4	(0)

International career^{‡}
2004–2014	Philippines	47	(2)
Medal record
Men's football
Representing Philippines
AFC Challenge Cup
Silver medal – second place	2014 Maldives
- * Club domestic league appearances and goals as of 20 May 2024 ‡ National team caps and goals as of 31 October 2014

Anton Edward Quimson del Rosario (born 23 December 1981) is a former professional footballer who last played as a right back or centre-back for Maharlika Manila, of which he is also a co-founder and co-owner. Born in the United States, he represented the Philippines national team from 2004 to 2014.

== Youth and college ==
Since the age six, Del Rosario has had a passion for football which his older brother and his parents were influential figures. He then played for a local team in the Hillsborough, California. He eventually played football at Burlingame High School for four years and was part of the varsity team which was the first CCS Champion Team at the school. In 2004 that Varsity CCS Champion Team of 1996-1997 was inducted into the Burlingame High School Athletic Hall of Fame, which his older brother was also a part of.

After high school, he continued his passion and played football in Burlingame, playing two years of football at Skyline College and then two years at Notre Dame de Namur University.

== Club career ==
Del Rosario played for Kaya from 1999 to 2014. He served as captain for the football club.

After 15 years with Kaya, del Rosario joined division rivals Loyola Meralco Sparks F.C. where he played as a center back. In 2017, del Rosario joined the newly-formed Ilocos United F.C. of the Philippines Football League (PFL). Del Rosario also served as the club's captain, being the most veteran player on the squad.

After Ilocos left the PFL after the conclusion of the 2017 season, del Rosario took a break from professional football before signing in for Global Cebu debuting for the club in their 0–1 loss against the Davao Aguilas on August 18 in the latter part of the 2018 season.

== International career ==
While living in the Philippines for a couple of years as a teenager, Del Rosario tried out for the Philippine national team. He was successful enough to get selected and has been involved with the national team since 2000. Although he only made his debut on 8 December 2004 against Myanmar in the Tiger Cup. He went on to play all the matches in that tournament as a right back and has since become an integral part of the Philippine national team.

Del Rosario scored his first goal against Brunei via a free kick from 30 yards in the 2007 ASEAN Football Championship qualifiers.

=== International goals ===
Scores and results list Philippines' goal tally first.

#	Date	Venue	Opponent	Score	Result	Competition
2006
1.	20 November 2006	Panaad Stadium, Bacolod	Brunei	1–0	4–1	2007 AFF Championship qualifier
2010
2.	22 October 2010	New Laos National Stadium, Vientiane	Timor-Leste	3–0	5–0	2010 AFF Suzuki Cup qualifier

Del Rosario also has two own goals to his name; against Malaysia in the 2007 AFF Championship, and against Turkmenistan in the 2010 AFC Challenge Cup qualifiers.

== Other involvement in football ==
Del Rosario established the 7's Football League (7s FL) in 2018, a non-CP seven-a-side football league. He also founded Maharlika FC which has applied to join the Philippines Football League which could make its league debut in the 2020 season at earliest. The club intends to be active in 2020, with plans also to join the Weekend Futbol League.

== Personal life ==
Del Rosario is the younger brother of former Philippine international footballer Armand Del Rosario. Del Rosario says that he is very close to his brother and credits him for turning football in his life. In 2007, Del Rosario was able to help Julie Loucks get into the Philippine women's national football team. Louks, a Philippine born American, was on the roster of the women's team at Notre Dame de Namur University at that time. Del Rosario informed and spoke highly of her to the coaches of the national team which led to successful tryouts.

In 2012, Del Rosario and his older brother, Armand joined TV5's The Amazing Race Philippines. They were eliminated in Leg 2 after they violated a rule (contacting someone outside the race) finishing in 10th place.

Del Rosario became engaged with Samantha Richelle Bolkiah, daughter of Prince Jefri Bolkiah of Brunei after about a year and a half of dating.

== Honours ==
=== Club ===
Kaya

- United Football League: Runner-up 2011–12

Loyola

- PFF National Men's Club Championship: 2014–15

Philippines

- AFC Challenge Cup runner-up: 2014
