= The Amazing Race Philippines =

Philippine adventure reality game show

- Title card
- Genre: Reality competition
- Created by: Elise Doganieri; Bertram van Munster
- Based on: The Amazing Race by: Bertram van Munster; Elise Doganieri
- Directed by: Michael McKay
- Creative director: Brad Cox
- Presented by: Derek Ramsay
- Theme music composer: John M. Keane
- Country of origin: Philippines
- Original languages: Filipino; English
- No. of seasons: 2
- No. of episodes: 108

Production
- Executive producer: Michael McKay
- Producer: Joan Leong
- Production location: Philippines
- Camera setup: Multi-camera
- Running time: approx. 20 – 25 minutes per episode (without commercials)
- Production company: activeTV (2012)

Original release
- Network: TV5
- Release: October 29, 2012 – December 7, 2014

Related
- International versions

The Amazing Race Philippines is a Philippine television reality competition show broadcast by TV5. The show is based on the American series The Amazing Race. Hosted by Derek Ramsey, it aired from October 29, 2012, to December 7, 2014, replacing Artista Academy and was replaced by Wattpad Presents. Each season is split into legs, with teams tasked to deduce clues, navigate themselves in foreign areas, interact with locals, perform physical and mental challenges, and travel by air, boat, car, taxi, and other modes of transport. Teams are progressively eliminated at the end of most legs for being the last to arrive at designated Pit Stops. The first team to arrive at the Finish Line wins the grand prize of ₱2 million.

The show is produced by the Australian production company, activeTV, which has also produced The Amazing Race Asia, The Amazing Race Australia, an Israeli version called HaMerotz LaMillion, and the Ukrainian version called Velyki Perehony. It is the fifth Asia-Pacific version after The Amazing Race Asia, The Amazing Race Australia, The Amazing Race: China Rush and The Amazing Race Vietnam.

== The Race ==
The Amazing Race Philippines is a reality television competition between eleven teams of two in a race around the Philippines. The race is divided into a number of legs wherein teams travel and complete various tasks to obtain clues to help them progress to a Pit Stop where they are given a chance to rest and recover before starting the next leg twelve hours later. The first team to arrive at a Pit Stop is often awarded a prize while the last team is normally eliminated from the race (except in non-elimination legs). The final leg of each race is run by the last three remaining teams, and the first to arrive at the final destination wins the ₱2 million cash prize.

=== Teams ===
Each team is composed of two individuals who have some type of relationship to each other. A total of 22 participants have joined The Amazing Race Philippines, some of which have been local celebrities.

Casts must be at least 21 years old, and must be a Filipino citizen or a permanent resident of the Philippines for at least two years.

Among the cast of the first season are Danielle Castaño, who represented the Philippines in the Miss World 2008 pageant; Raymund Vergara, a Mister Philippines 2003 World contestant; LJ Moreno, a former Pinoy Fear Factor contestant; Jervi Li and Saida Diola, former part of a Philippines noontime show Eat Bulaga; football players Armand and Anton del Rosario, and ABS-CBN reporter Angel Movido.

=== Route Markers ===
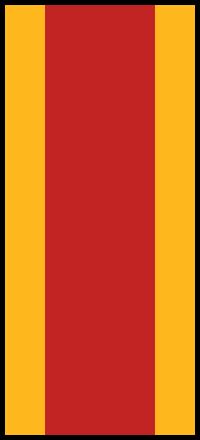

Route Markers are yellow and red flags that mark the places where teams must go. Most Route Markers are attached to the boxes that contain clue envelopes, but some may mark the place where the teams must go in order to complete tasks, or may be used to line a course that the teams must follow.

=== Clues ===
Clues are found throughout the competition in sealed envelopes, normally inside clue boxes. They give teams the information they need and tasks they need to do in order for them to progress.

- Route Info: A general clue that may include a task to be completed by the team before they can receive their next clue.
- Detour: A choice between two tasks. Teams are free to choose either task or swap tasks if they find one option too difficult.
- Roadblock: A task only one team member can complete. Teams must choose which member will complete the task based on a brief clue about the task before fully revealing the details of the task.
- Fast Forward: A task that only one team may complete, allowing that team to skip all remaining tasks and head directly for the next Pit Stop. Teams may only claim one Fast Forward during the entire season.

=== Obstacles ===
Teams may encounter the following that may affect their position during the race:

- Yield: It is where a team can force another trailing team to wait a predetermined amount of time before continuing the race.
  - In the first season of The Amazing Race Philippines, the local version introduced the Anonymous Yield, wherein the team who chooses to Yield another team does not have to reveal their identity.
- Intersection: It indicates that two teams must complete further tasks together until a clue indicates that they have been separated.
- U-Turn: It is where a team can force another trailing team to complete the other option of the Detour they did not select. Teams may only use their ability to U-Turn another team once throughout the race.
- Duel: It is where two teams compete to receive their next clue. The team who wins the challenge will get their next clue while the losing team must then wait for another team to arrive to redo the challenge. The cycle repeats until the last team left will have to, again, repeat the challenge.

=== Legs ===
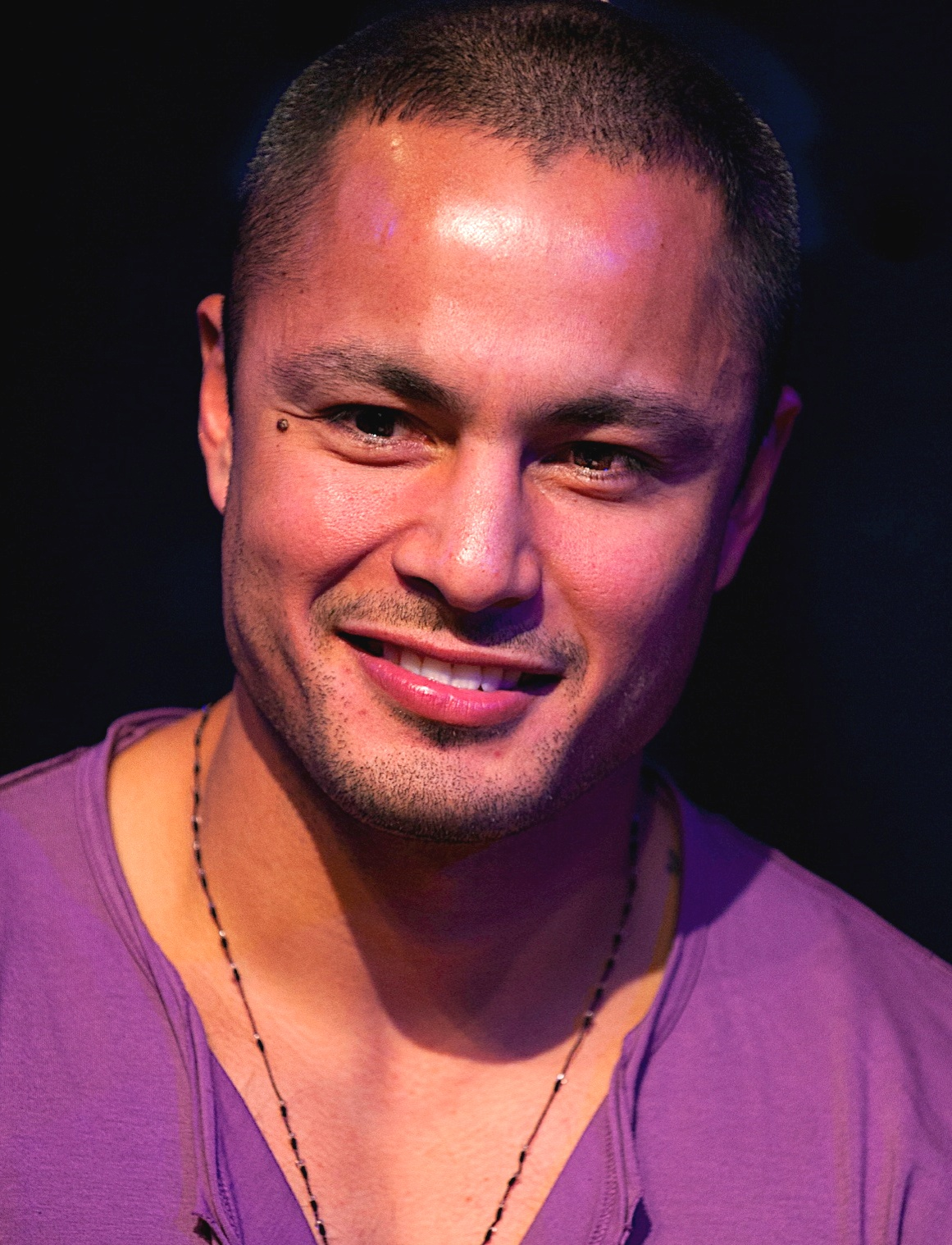
Host Derek Ramsay

At the beginning of each leg, teams receive an allowance of cash to cover expenses during the race (except for the purchase of airline tickets, which are paid-for by credit cards provided to the teams).

Teams then have to follow clues and Route Markers that will lead them to the various destinations and tasks they will face. Modes of travel between these destinations include commercial and chartered airplanes, boats, taxis, buses, and rented vehicles provided by the show, or the teams may simply travel by foot. Each leg ends with a twelve-hour Pit Stop where teams are able to rest and where teams that arrive last are progressively eliminated from the race until only three remain. In some legs, the first teams to arrive at the Pit Stop win prizes, usually from the show's sponsors, and some passes that will give them advantages in the race:

- The Salvage Pass was awarded to the winners of the first leg of the first season which allows the team to either gain a 30-minute advantage in a task or save the last team from elimination. Marc & Kat won this pass and used it to enter the Bantay Bell Tower before its "Hours of Operation".
- The Express Pass was awarded to the winners of the third leg of the first season and the winners of the first leg of the second season. This allows that team to skip any task they want during the race. Marc & Kat won this pass in the first season and used it to skip the Roadblock challenge in Leg 5. The Express Pass was used differently in Season 2, in it Vince & Ed could only use the pass up until Leg 4.

==== Non-elimination Legs ====
A non-elimination leg is when the last team to arrive at the Pit Stop is not eliminated and is allowed to continue on the race. The Amazing Race Philippines, along with the French version, were the first versions of the race that did not penalize the last team to arrive in a non-elimination leg since the incorporation of the non-elimination penalties in season 5 of the American Version. This occurred in the third leg of the first season and all non-elimination legs in the second season. However, in the seventh and eleventh legs of the first season, the "Marked for Elimination" penalty was applied to the last team arriving on a non-elimination leg, meaning teams had to arrive first at the next leg or receive a 30-minute time penalty.

=== Rules and penalties ===
Most of the rules and penalties are adopted from the American edition.

One of the most notable penalties was the penalty received by Anton & Armand in the second leg of the first season. Anton & Armand initially arrived 4th at the second Pit Stop of the race, but were issued a 24-hour time penalty for contacting someone outside the race. They dropped to 10th place and were eliminated.

== Seasons ==
Season	Broadcast		Winners	Teams
Season	Premiere	Finale	Winners	Teams
1	October 29, 2012	December 15, 2012	LJ Moreno & CJ Jaravata	11
2	October 6, 2014	December 7, 2014	Matt Edwards & Phoebe Walker	11

== Places visited ==
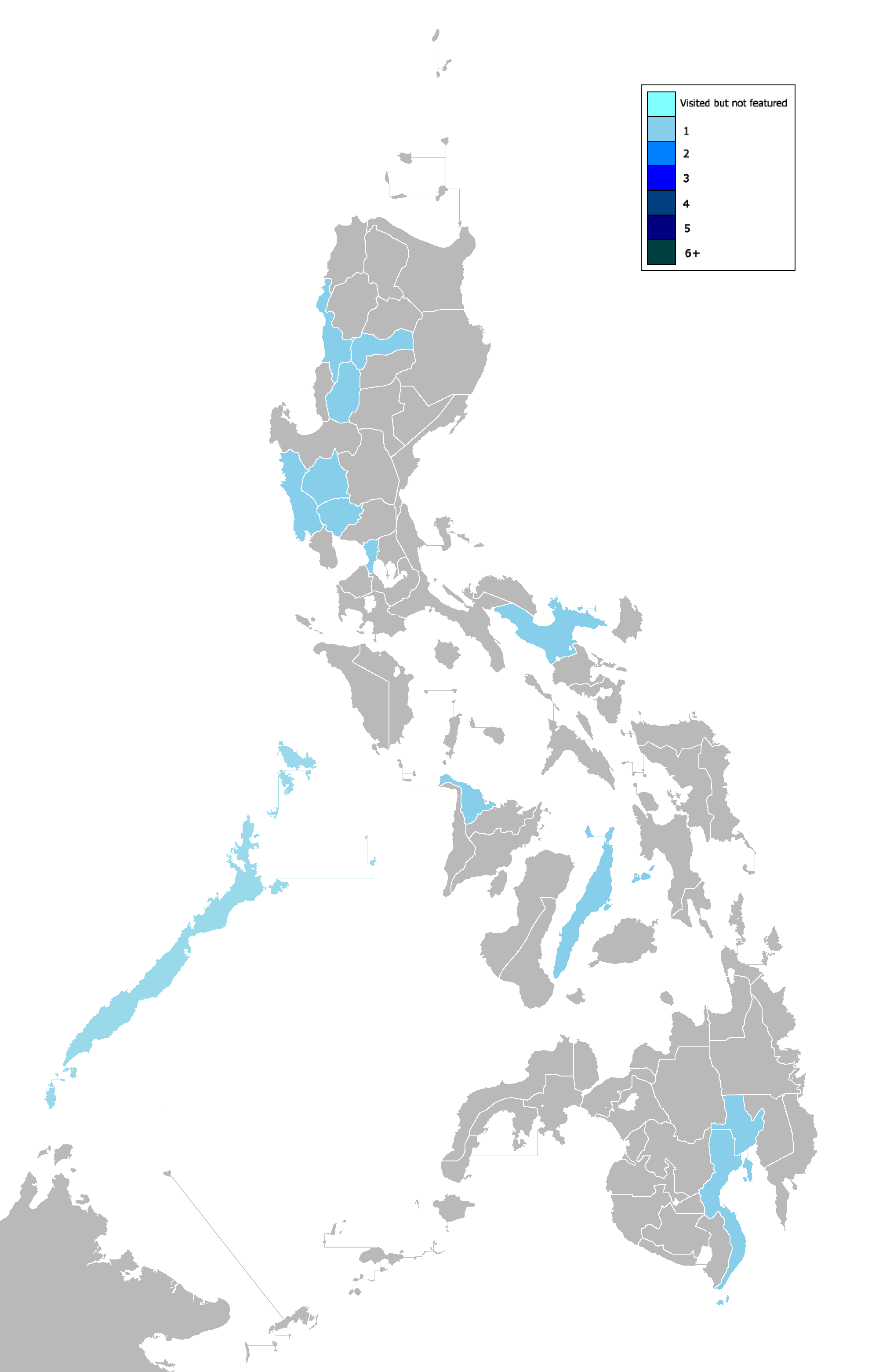
Provinces visited by The Amazing Race Philippines.

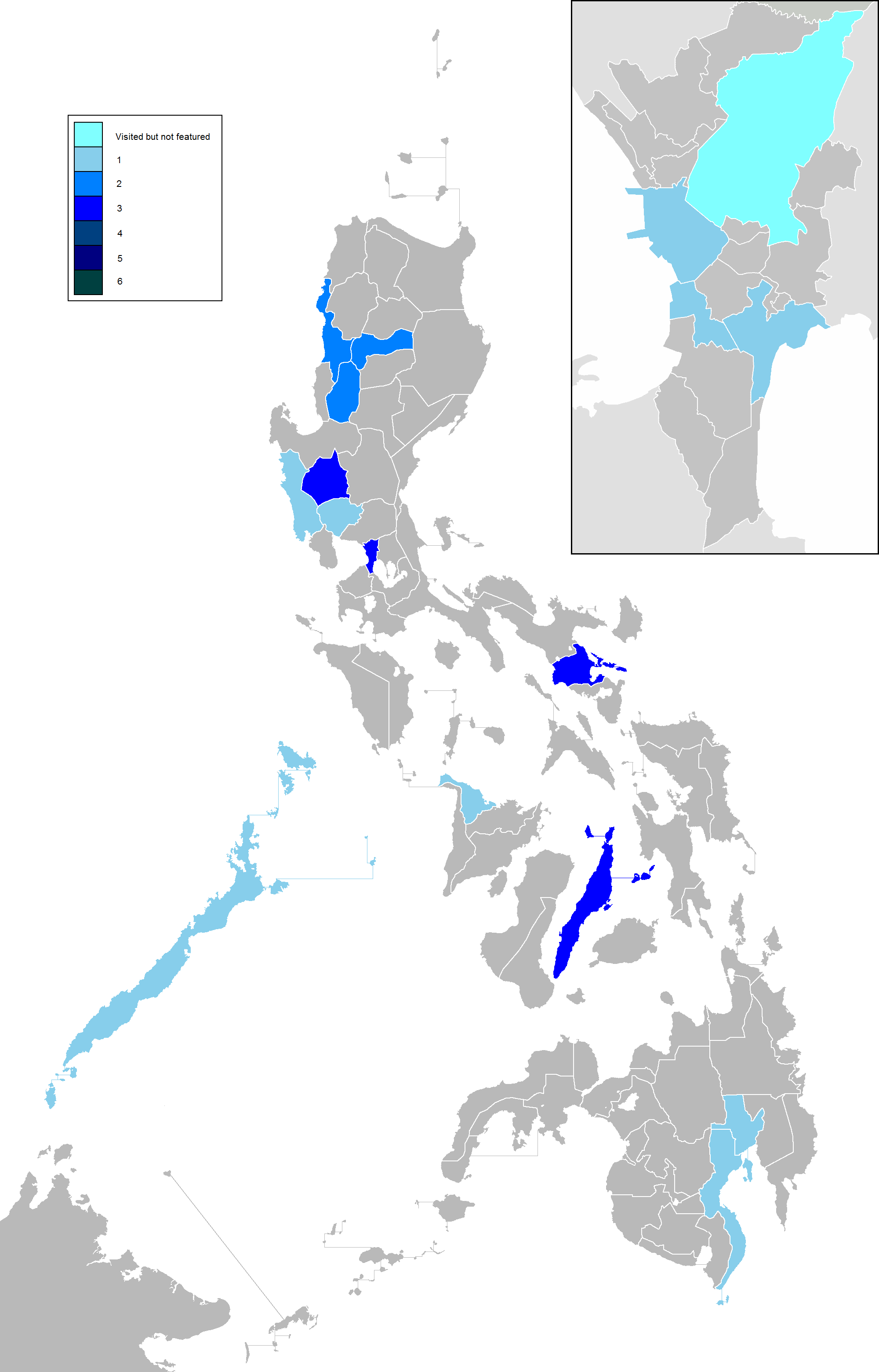
The number of places in a province visited by The Amazing Race Philippines. Includes an inset of Metro Manila showing the cities which were visited by the show.

As of the second season, The Amazing Race Philippines has visited 14 cities and 10 municipalities in 13 provinces across the Philippines.^{1}

Cities	Municipalities
Angeles City; Baguio; Cebu City; Davao; Imus, Cavite; Lapu-Lapu; Legazpi, Albay; Mabalacat, Pampanga; Mandaue, Cebu; Makati; Manila; Pasay; Puerto Princesa; Samal, Davao del Norte; Tagaytay, Cavite; Taguig; Vigan, Ilocos Sur	Bacacay, Albay; Bauan, Batangas; Bantay, Ilocos Sur; Bontoc, Mountain Province; Daraga, Albay; Itogon, Benguet; Magalang, Pampanga; Malay, Aklan; Sagada, Mountain Province; Subic, Zambales; Capas, Tarlac

=== Number of times visited ===
The following are the number of times the provinces are visited by The Amazing Race Philippines. Note that Metro Manila is not a province but a cluster of cities, though it will be classified under it. Independent cities will also be classified under their associated provinces, although they are not officially part of that province.^{2}

==== By Province ====
Rank	Province	Season Visited	Number of Places Visited	Pit Stops
1	Metro Manila	1, 2	4	2
2	Albay	1	3	2
3	Palawan	1	1	2
4	Cebu	1, 2	3	2
5	Benguet	1	2	1
5	Ilocos Sur	1, 2	2	1
5	Mountain Province	1	2	1
8	Aklan	1	1	1
8	Davao del Norte	1	1	1
8	Tarlac	1	1	1
8	Zambales	1	1	1
12	Pampanga	1	3	0
13	Cavite	2	2	0
14	Davao del Sur	1	1	0
14	Batangas	2	1	0

Notes

1. This count only includes provinces that fielded actual route markers, challenges or finish mats. Transport stopovers (such as Quezon City in season 1) and connecting flights are not counted or listed.
2. Table rankings are first based on the number of seasons, followed by the number of Pit Stops, by Provinces visited, and lastly by number of places visited.

== Reception ==
=== Television ratings ===
Television ratings for The Amazing Race Philippines on TV5 are based from two firms, AGB Nielsen and Kantar Media - TNS. AGB Nielsen mostly covers Mega Manila, while Kantar Media - TNS covers mostly of the Philippines.

Season	Premiered	Ended	Episodes	Season Premiere	Rank		Season Finale	Rank		Media	Source
Season	Premiered	Ended	Episodes	Season Premiere	Timeslot	Primetime	Season Finale	Timeslot	Primetime	Media	Source
1	October 29, 2012	December 15, 2012	45	5.1%	#3	#10	N/A	N/A	N/A	AGB Nielsen	
1	October 29, 2012	December 15, 2012	45	3.6%	#3	< #10	5.8%	#4	N/A	Kantar Media – TNS	
2	October 6, 2014	December 7, 2014	63	3.6%	#3	< #10	3.6%	#3	< #10	AGB Nielsen	
2	October 6, 2014	December 7, 2014	63	1.9%	#3	< #10	1.8%	#3	< #10	Kantar Media – TNS	

=== Awards and nominations ===
Year	Association	Award/Recognition	Category	Nominee	Result	Source
2014	Entertainment Press Society	2013 Golden Screen TV Awards	Outstanding Adapted Reality/Competition Program	season 1	Won	
2014	Entertainment Press Society	2013 Golden Screen TV Awards	Outstanding Adapted Reality/Competition Program Host	Derek Ramsay	Nominated	
2015	Philippine Entertainment Portal	The PEP List Year 2	Best Talk/Variety Show of the Year	season 2	Won	
2015	Skål International Makati	SKAL Tourism Personality Awards	Best Tourism Reality Show	season 2	Won	

== See also ==
- List of TV5 (Philippine TV network) original programming
