= Lizardo Bus Lines =

Lizardo Bus Lines is a bus line in the Philippines. The bus line are both using aircon and ordinary buses for their routes.

== Terminal ==
- Slaughterhouse Compound, Baguio
- Dangwa Bus Terminal, Baguio

== Destinations ==
- Sagada, Mountain Province
- Bontoc, Mountain Province
- Tabuk City, Kalinga
- Maria Aurora, Aurora
- Baler, Aurora
- Maddela, Quirino
- Sadanga, Mountain Province
- Bauko, Mountain Province
