= The Amazing Race Philippines 2 =

Season of television series

- Season 2
- Presented by: Derek Ramsay
- No. of teams: 11
- Winners: Matt Edwards & Phoebe Walker
- No. of legs: 10
- No. of episodes: 63 (including recaps)

Release
- Original network: TV5
- Original release: October 6 – December 7, 2014

Additional information
- Filming dates: August 25 – September 15, 2014

Season chronology
- ← Previous; Season 1

The Amazing Race Philippines 2 is the second season of The Amazing Race Philippines. It featured eleven teams of two, each in a pre-existing relationship, in a race around the Philippines. Derek Ramsay returned as the host of the show.

The show premiered on October 6, 2014. It was first aired every Monday to Friday at 7:00 p.m., and Saturday at 9:00 p.m. (PST) on TV5. During the third week, it was moved to 9:00 p.m. every Monday to Saturday. A special recap episode of those shown during the week aired every Sunday at 9:00 p.m. (PST).

Dating couple Matthew "Matt" Edwards and Phoebe Walker were the winners of this season.

== Production ==
=== Development and filming ===
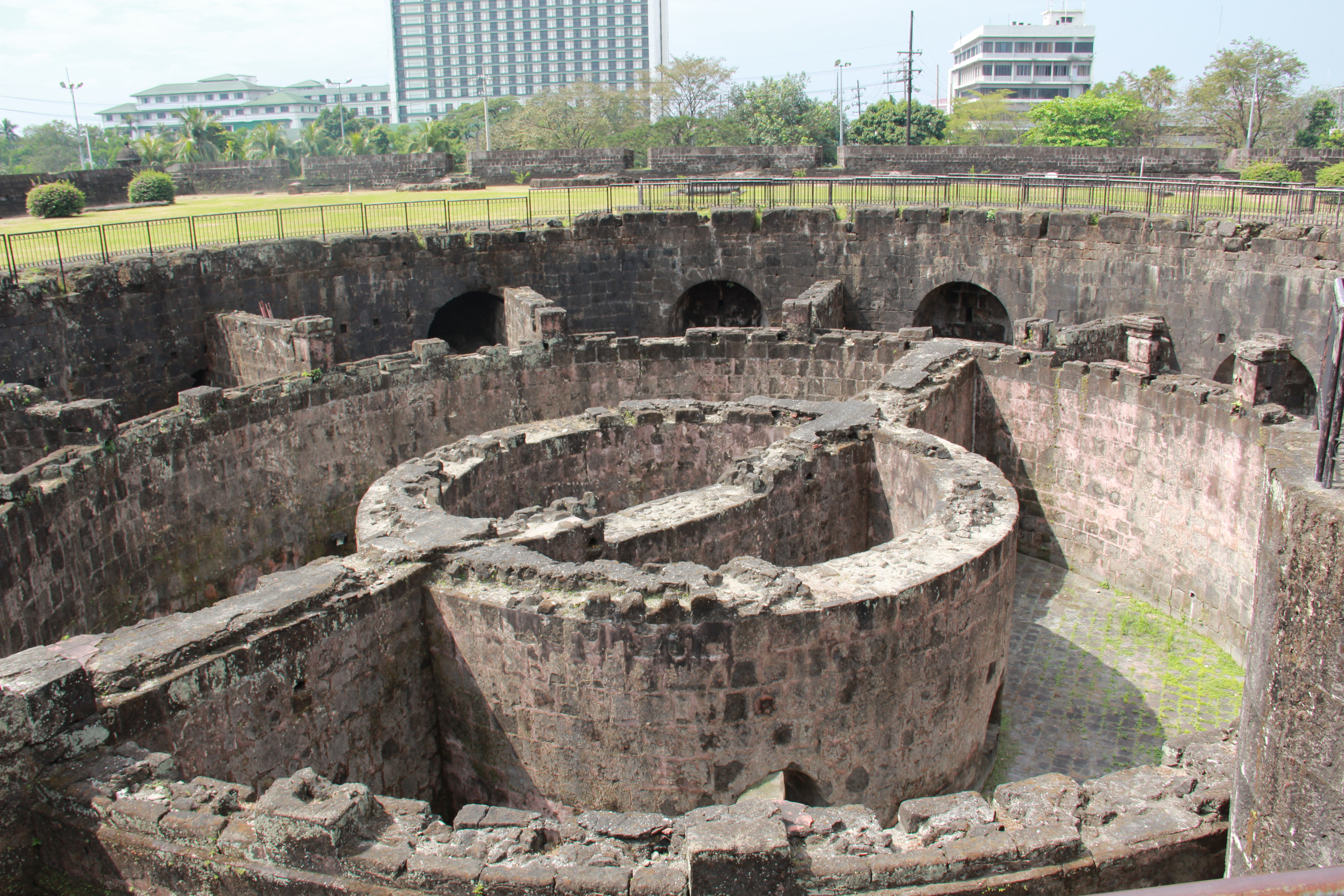
The ruins of Baluarte de San Diego in Intramuros, Manila served as backdrop of the Starting Line for the second season of The Amazing Race Philippines.

In late 2013, TV5 announced that it had renewed the show for a second season. The network had earlier announced that this season, dubbed The Amazing Race Philippines: Biyaheng Asya, would feature challenges across several Asian countries. However, this was dropped due to time and logistical constraints in order to have the show ready for an October 2014 premiere date.

Filming took place in late August 2014. Like the first season, TV5 commissioned the Australian production company, activeTV to produce the show. According to executive producer, and director, Michael McKay, this season was going to have major changes with a tweaked format and the Fast Forward task, was to be dropped. A total of 39 cameras were used to film the second season with drones filming aerial shots. This season was also the first international race to use the new title card and graphics package introduced on season 23 of the American series.

In Leg 1, judges featured in the Priscilla, Queen of Desert task included theatre actors Menchu Lauchengco-Yulo, Michael Williams (who were both starring in the musical), Joey Mead King, and Resorts World Manila Entertainment Head, Colin Kerr.

In Leg 2, Jodilly Pendre, from Asia's Next Top Model, was featured as the clue giver at the Makati City Go Kart challenge.

Notable Pit Stop greeters included actresses Jasmine Curtis (Leg 1) and Ritz Azul (Leg 3), beauty pageant contestant Heidi Ronato (Leg 4), Festival Queen "Reyna ng Aliwan 2014" Steffi Rose Aberasturi (Leg 6), Miss Bohol 2014 Queenie Melody Fullante (Leg 7), and Miss Iloilo 2014 Janine May Coo (Leg 8).

This season introduced a new twist, called the "Duel", where teams had to compete head-to-head in a pre-determined challenge, where winning teams can move on to the next challenge, while the losing team had to wait for new challengers. The team who lost the last Duel would face a penalty.

=== Casting ===
Auditions were held from June 13, 2014, to June 28, 2014, which was then extended to July 18, 2014. Applicants had to be at least 21 years old, and a Filipino citizen, or a permanent resident of the Philippines. Auditions were done using three methods: online, mail-in, and in person at TV5 Broadway Studio in Quezon City as well as other locations such as: SM City CEBU, Matina Town Square, Davao, and Marquee Mall, Pampanga.

=== Broadcasting ===
The show was broadcast as a weekday program airing for 30 minutes per episode, six times a week for ten weeks beginning October 6, 2014. Unlike the first season, each leg was shown over the course of a week with each episode showing at least one task that teams had to complete. The race to the Pit Stop aired on Saturday and a 30-minute recap of the weekly episodes aired on Sundays. This is in contrast to other versions of the show which aired each leg in one or two episodes per week. The last two episodes aired an hour long, and with the penultimate episode showcasing not only the final task and subsequent race to the Pit Stop, but also the highlights of the entire race at the end.

== Cast ==
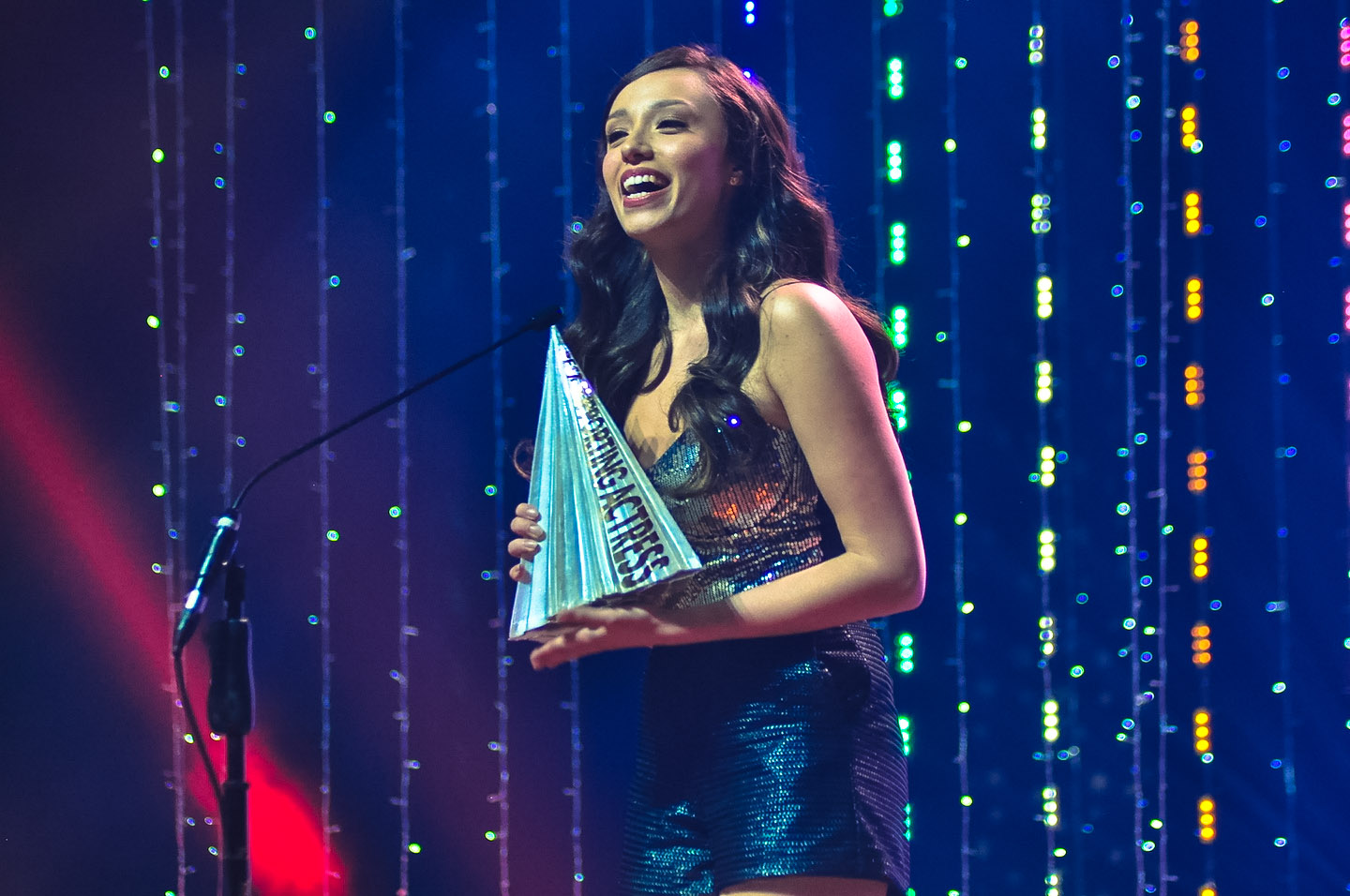
Phoebe Walker

During the press conference held on September 22, 2014, at Resorts World Manila, the contestants were revealed. The cast included: Juan Direction cast members Daniel Marsh, Charlie Sutcliffe, and Matt Edwards; a member of the girl group Eurasia, Phoebe Walker; Filipina boxer Gretchen "Chen" Abaniel; former Pinoy Big Brother housemate Luz McClinton, and former Wowowee host RR Enriquez.

It was revealed on the show that after their elimination in Leg 2, Gretchen "Chen" Abaniel and Luz McClinton were no longer friends and were no longer on speaking terms. Chen was absent at the Finish Line and did not join the other racers.

Contestants	Age	Team Name	Hometown	Status
Zarah Evangelista	24	Travel Buddies	Davao City, Davao del Sur	Eliminated 1st (in Manila, Metro Manila)
Rosanna "Osang" Dela Rosa	25	Travel Buddies	Davao City, Davao del Sur	Eliminated 1st (in Manila, Metro Manila)
Chen Albaniel	28	Pinay World Champs	Puerto Princesa, Palawan	Eliminated 2nd (in Taal, Batangas)
Luz McClitton	36	Pinay World Champs	Muntinlupa, Metro Manila	Eliminated 2nd (in Taal, Batangas)
Daniel Marsh	25	Team Juan D	Argao, Cebu	Eliminated 3rd (in Lingayen, Pangasinan)
Charlie Sutcliffe	25	Team Juan D	Alegria, Cebu	Eliminated 3rd (in Lingayen, Pangasinan)
Tina Wells	26	The Blondies	Pilar, Bataan	Eliminated 4th (in San Fernando, La Union)
Avy Wells	22	The Blondies	Pilar, Bataan	Eliminated 4th (in San Fernando, La Union)
RR Enriquez	30	Sexy Besties	Quezon City, Metro Manila	Eliminated 5th (in Mactan, Cebu)
Jeck Maierhofer	28	Sexy Besties	San Pedro, Laguna	Eliminated 5th (in Mactan, Cebu)
Vince Yu	24	The Nerds	Quezon City, Metro Manila	Eliminated 6th (in Iloilo City, Iloilo)
Ed Maguan	21	The Nerds	San Juan, Metro Manila	Eliminated 6th (in Iloilo City, Iloilo)
AJ Saliba	52	Father & Son	Olongapo, Zambales	Eliminated 7th (in Iloilo City, Iloilo)
Jody Saliba	21	Father & Son	Olongapo, Zambales	Eliminated 7th (in Iloilo City, Iloilo)
Jet Cruz	29	Siblings	Baguio, Benguet	Eliminated 8th (in Cagayan de Oro, Misamis Oriental)
Yna Cruz	28	Siblings	Baguio, Benguet	Eliminated 8th (in Cagayan de Oro, Misamis Oriental)
Roch Hernandez	34	The Chefs	Santa Maria, Bulacan	Third Place
Eji Estillore	29	The Chefs	Cebu City, Cebu	Third Place
Kelvin Engles	23	Team Mr. Pogi	Manila, Metro Manila	Second Place
JP Duray	25	Team Mr. Pogi	Olongapo, Zambales	Second Place
Matthew "Matt" Edwards	22	Dating Couple	Angeles City, Pampanga	Winners
Phoebe Walker	21	Dating Couple	Hong Kong, China	Winners

== Results ==
The following teams participated in the season, each listed along with their placements in each leg and their team name as identified by the program. Note that this table is not necessarily reflective of all content broadcast on television, owing to the inclusion or exclusion of some data. Placements are listed in finishing order:

Team	Position (by leg)										Roadblocks performed
Team	1+	2+	3	4	5	6+	7	8^{7}+	9+	10	Roadblocks performed
Matt & Phoebe	3rd	1st	1st⊃	1st<^{3}	5th⊂	4th<	2nd>	1st+⊃	2nd<	1st	Matt 5, Phoebe 5
Kelvin & JP	6th	7th^{⋐}_{⊃}	7th⊂	7th>	6th⊃	2nd	4th>	4th~⊃	1st>	2nd	Kelvin 4, JP 6
Roch & Eji	7th	4th⊃	2nd	4th>	2nd⊃	5th>	1st>	3rd^⊃	3rd−>	3rd	Roch 4, Eji 6
Jet & Yna	2nd	2nd⊃	3rd	2nd>	3rd⊃	3rd>	3rd>	2nd^⊃	4th>		Jet 5, Yna 4
AJ & Jody	5th	5th⋑	4th⊃	3rd>	1st⊃	1st>	6th<^{6}	5th+⊂			AJ 4, Jody 4
Vince & Ed	1st	3rd⋑	5th⊃	5th>ε^{4}	4th⊃	6th>	5th^{6}	6th−~⊃			Vince 4, Ed 4
RR & Jeck	10th	8th−^{1}	6th	6th>	7th⊃^{5}	7th−>					RR 4, Jeck 2^{1}
Tina & Avy	8th	6th	8th	8th							Tina 2, Avy 2
Daniel & Charlie	9th	9th^{⊂}_{⋑}	9th								Daniel 0, Charlie 3
Chen & Luz	4th	10th−^{2}									Chen 1, Luz 1
Zarah & Osang	11th−										Zarah 1, Osang 0

Key

- A red team placement means the team was eliminated.
- A purple ε indicates that the team decided to use the Express Pass on that leg.
- An underlined blue team's placement indicates that the team came in last on a non-elimination leg.
- A brown ⊃ or cyan ⋑ indicates that the team chose to use the U-Turn; ⊂ or ⋐ indicates the team who received it.
- A gold > indicates that the team chose to use the Yield option; < indicates the team who received it.
- Matching colored symbols (pink +, teal ^ and olive ~) indicate teams who worked together during part of the leg as a result of an Intersection.
- An underlined leg number indicates that there was no mandatory rest period at the Pit Stop and all teams were ordered to continue racing. An underlined team placement indicates that the team came in last and was not eliminated.
- An orange + means there was a Duel on this leg, while a − indicates who lost the Duel and had to serve a penalty.

Notes

1. Jeck elected to quit the Roadblock and she and RR were issued a four-hour penalty at the Roadblock site.
2. Chen & Luz lost the bottle cap they needed for a task in Leg 2. They had to wait for all the teams to finish the task and wait an additional 30 minutes before they could attempt the task.
3. Matt & Phoebe had to turn the hourglass twice at the Yield Reveal Board due to unsafe driving during Leg 4.
4. Vince & Ed used their Express Pass to bypass the additional task at Bacsil Ridge in Leg 4.
5. RR & Jeck arrived at Paoay Sand Dunes and were unable to do the task because it was too dark for them to safely perform the task. They were given the next clue instead, and were issued a two-hour penalty at the Pit Stop.
6. Vince & Ed and AJ & Jody failed to complete the final "Hammock Trail" task. Both teams were issued 90-minute penalties before receiving their next clue.
7. Leg 8 was a double-elimination leg. The last two teams checked in at the Pit Stop were both eliminated.

=== Voting history ===
In this season, teams encountered a voting board sometime during each leg. There, they had to cast their vote for the team they wished to delay during that leg. However, unlike last season, teams were unaware if the team they were voting for would either be U-Turned or Yielded until the clue prior to the reveal board. The team with the most votes was either delayed by a U-Turn or a Yield. Teams that had been U-Turned had to complete both Detour choices while teams that had been Yielded incurred a time penalty and had to turn an hour glass at the Yield reveal board before they could continue racing.

	U-Turn		Yield	U-Turn	Yield		U-Turn	Yield
Leg #	2	3	4	5	6	7	8	9
Result:	JP & Kelvin; Daniel & Charlie; 3–3–2–1–1	JP & Kelvin; 3–2–2–1–1	Matt & Phoebe; 6–1–1	Matt & Phoebe; 6–1	Matt & Phoebe; 5–2	AJ & Jody; 4–2	AJ & Jody; 5–1	Matt & Phoebe; 3–1
Voter	Vote							
Matt & Phoebe	Jet & Yna	Kelvin & JP	RR & Jeck	Jet & Yna	AJ & Jody	AJ & Jody	AJ & Jody	Jet & Yna
Kelvin & JP	Daniel & Charlie	Vince & Ed	Matt & Phoebe	Matt & Phoebe	AJ & Jody	AJ & Jody	AJ & Jody	Matt & Phoebe
Roch & Eji	Daniel & Charlie	Daniel & Charlie	Matt & Phoebe	Matt & Phoebe	Matt & Phoebe	AJ & Jody	AJ & Jody	Matt & Phoebe
Jet & Yna	Daniel & Charlie	Daniel & Charlie	Matt & Phoebe	Matt & Phoebe	Matt & Phoebe	AJ & Jody	AJ & Jody	Matt & Phoebe
AJ & Jody	Kelvin & JP	Kelvin & JP	Matt & Phoebe	Matt & Phoebe	Matt & Phoebe	Roch & Eji	Roch & Eji	
Vince & Ed	Kelvin & JP	Kelvin & JP	Matt & Phoebe	Matt & Phoebe	Matt & Phoebe	Roch & Eji	AJ & Jody	
RR & Jeck	Chen & Luz	Matt & Phoebe	Matt & Phoebe	Matt & Phoebe	Matt & Phoebe			
Tina & Avy	Vince & Ed	Jet & Yna	Jet & Yna					
Daniel & Charlie	Kelvin & JP	Jet & Yna						
Chen & Luz	Vince & Ed							

== Prizes ==
The winners of The Amazing Race Philippines 2 won ₱2 million from PLDT Home Telpad, two house and land lots from RCD Homes, and two brand new Kia Sportage cars. From Leg 2 onward, the winning team of each leg won ₱200,000 from Shell V-Power Nitro+, PLDT HOME Bro Ultera or Rexona. No prize was awarded in Leg 5.

The winners of Leg 1 won the Express Pass, allowing them to skip a single task of their choosing until the end of the fourth leg.

== Race summary ==
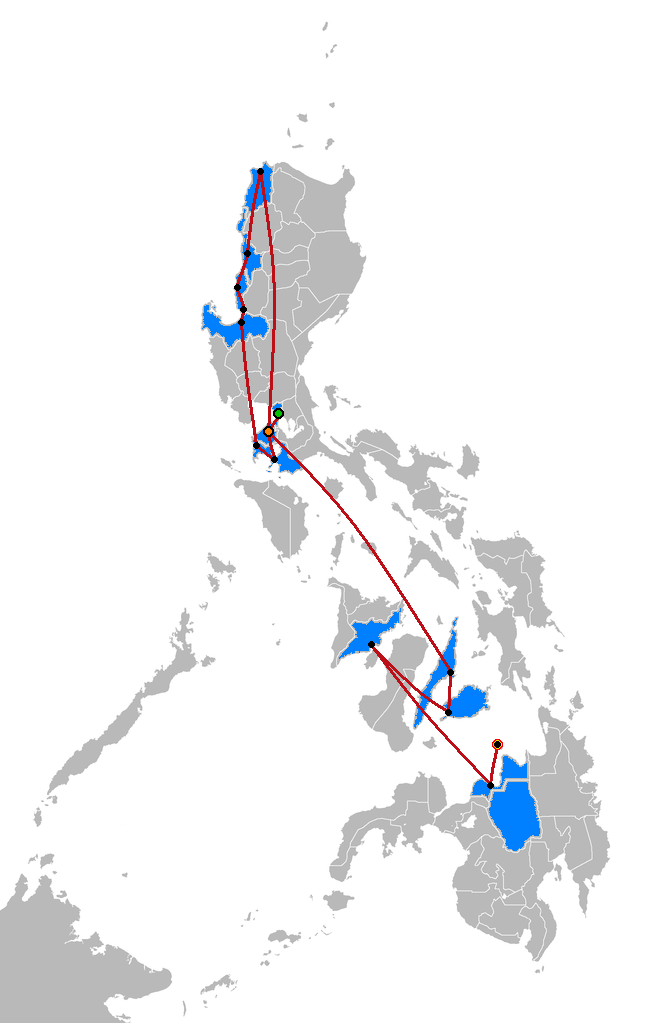
The complete route map of The Amazing Race Philippines 2. Note: orange dot indicates the destination point in Leg 2 and transfer point in Leg 6.

Destinations	Air travel Rail travel Water travel Bus travel Helicopter travel Bicycle travel Gondola travel
Route Markers	Detour Roadblock Duel Yield U-Turn Pit Stop

=== Leg 1 (Metro Manila) ===
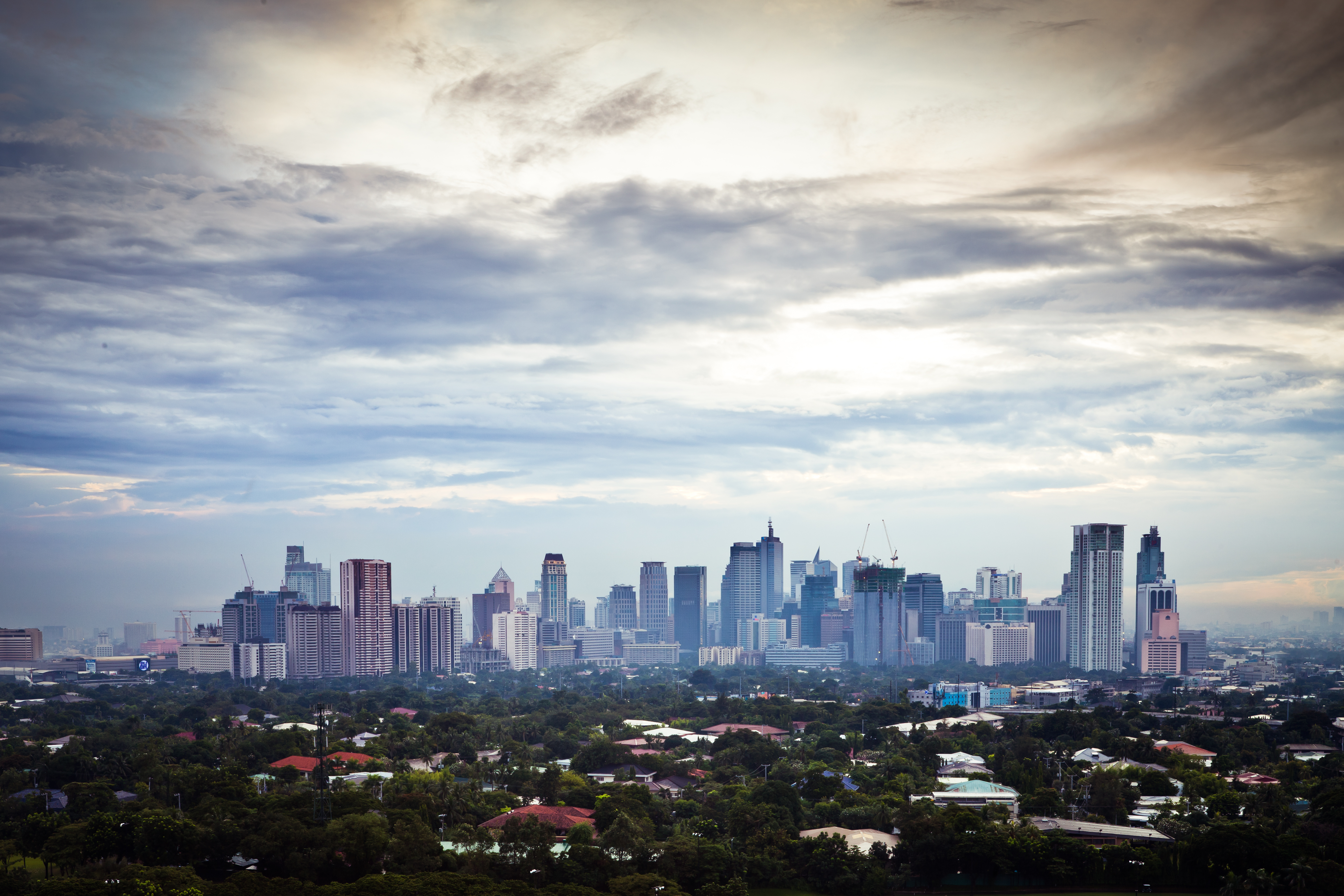
Much of the first leg took place in the business districts of Makati and Taguig.

Airdates: October 6–11, 2014

- Manila, Metro Manila, Philippines (Baluarte de San Diego) (Starting Line)
- Taguig (SM Aura Premier – SM Aura Office Tower)
- Taguig (Imperial Ice Bar)
- Makati (Ayala Tower One – Philippine Stock Exchange)
- Makati (University of Makati Stadium)
- Makati (Nodasho) or Quezon City (Center for Culinary Arts, Manila)
- Pasay (Resorts World Manila – Newport Performing Arts Theater)
- Manila (Manila Central Post Office)

In this season's first Roadblock, one team member had to rappel face-first from the 29th floor of the office tower of the SM Aura shopping mall to the mall's penthouse, where their partner was waiting, to receive their next clue.

For this series' first Duel, two teams had to compete in a 100 metres track and field sprint. The winning team received their next clue while the losing team had to wait for the next team to arrive and run again. The last losing team had to run one lap around the entire oval, with coaches Rio dela Cruz and Ani de Leon-Brown, before receiving their next clue.

This season's first Detour was a choice between Serve or Soufflé. In Serve, teams had to travel to Nodasho, don kimonos, and memorize food orders of various Japanese dishes from eight customers. If teams could correctly recite them to a chef, they would then have to serve the right dish to each customer before receiving their next clue. In Soufflé, teams had to travel to the Center for Culinary Arts and bake a batch of CCA's signature Filipino soufflés to the satisfaction of the head chef to receive their next clue.

Additional tasks

- At the Imperial Ice Bar, teams had to unscramble ice blocks containing letters and spell out "Stock Exchange" to receive their next clue.
- At the Philippine Stock Exchange, teams had to decipher a book cipher by figuring out that the numbers on their paper corresponded to the columns, rows, and letters on the stock market trading board. After decoding the message "Find Green Coat At Fountain", teams were given their next clue by a lady wearing a green coat at a nearby fountain.
- At Newport Performing Arts Theater, teams had to don costumes and perform a drag routine from the musical Priscilla, Queen of the Desert to the judges' satisfaction to receive their next clue.

=== Leg 2 (Metro Manila → Cavite & Batangas) ===
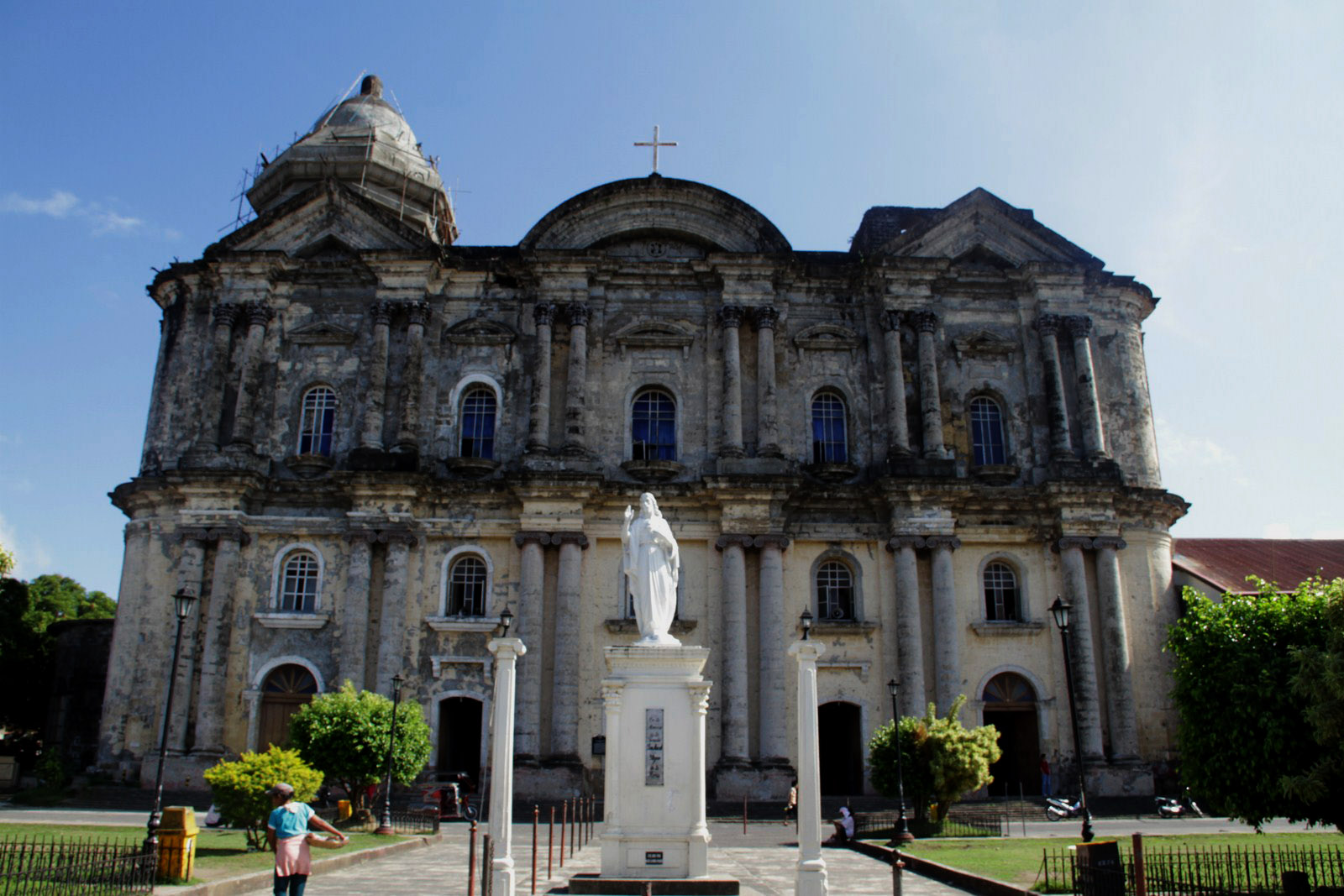
Taal Basilica served as the second Pit Stop.

Airdates: October 13–18, 2014

- Pasay (Resorts World Manila) (Pit Start)
- Makati (City Kart Racing Circuit)
- Imus, Cavite (Lotus Central Mall – Urban Peak Rock Climbing Gym)
- Bauan, Batangas (Bauan Public Market)
- Bauan (Our Lady of Lourdes grotto at Bauan Church)
- Tagaytay, Cavite (Sky Ranch Theme Park)
- Nasugbu, Batangas (Canyon Cove Beach Resort)
- Taal (Taal Basilica)

For this leg's Duel, teams had to race go-karts in groups of five teams. The three teams with the highest average speed after a predetermined number of laps in each heat received their next clue, while the bottom two teams had to wait for the next three teams to arrive for the second race. The top three teams in the second race would be given their next clue while the bottom two had to wait for the last two teams to arrive for the final race. The bottom two teams in the final race had to drive six laps around the race track before receiving their next clue.

In this leg's Roadblock, one team member had to climb to the top of a climbing wall and retrieve a Summit water bottle to receive their next clue. On the underside of the bottle caps were numbers that teams would need later in the leg.

This leg's Detour was a choice between Fruits or Fashion. In Fruits, teams had to purchase specified amounts of fruits on a list using only provided money and deliver them, using a wooden cart, to a marked area in the market to receive their next clue. In Fashion, teams had to dress a mannequin with five pieces of clothing that they had to purchase from various stalls in the market. Teams then had to return the mannequin to a marked stall, where they would discover that they had to convince locals to exchange the clothes that they were wearing for those on the mannequin to receive their next clue. After the Detour, teams had to proceed to the Our Lady of Lourdes grotto of Bauan Church to find the U-Turn reveal board.

Additional tasks

- At Bauan Public Market, teams had to vote for the team that they wished to U-Turn before receiving the Detour clue from a coconut vendor in the morning.
- At Sky Ranch Theme Park, teams had to choose one of 32 Ferris wheel gondolas and open the clue inside, which either told teams to try again or had an actual clue. They had to start with the gondola whose number matched the number on the bottle cap from the Roadblock. If teams chose a wrong gondola, they had to ride a full rotation before picking a new gondola.
- At Canyon Cove Beach Resort, teams had to dig through 100 sandcastles to find their next clue: a miniature model of the Basilica de San Martin de Tours that teams had to figure out was the location of the Pit Stop. If the sandcastle did not have a clue, teams had to rebuild it before they could continue searching.

Additional note

- After the Duel, teams would find a marked Kia Sportage, which would serve as their transportation for the rest of the leg.

=== Leg 3 (Batangas → Pangasinan) ===
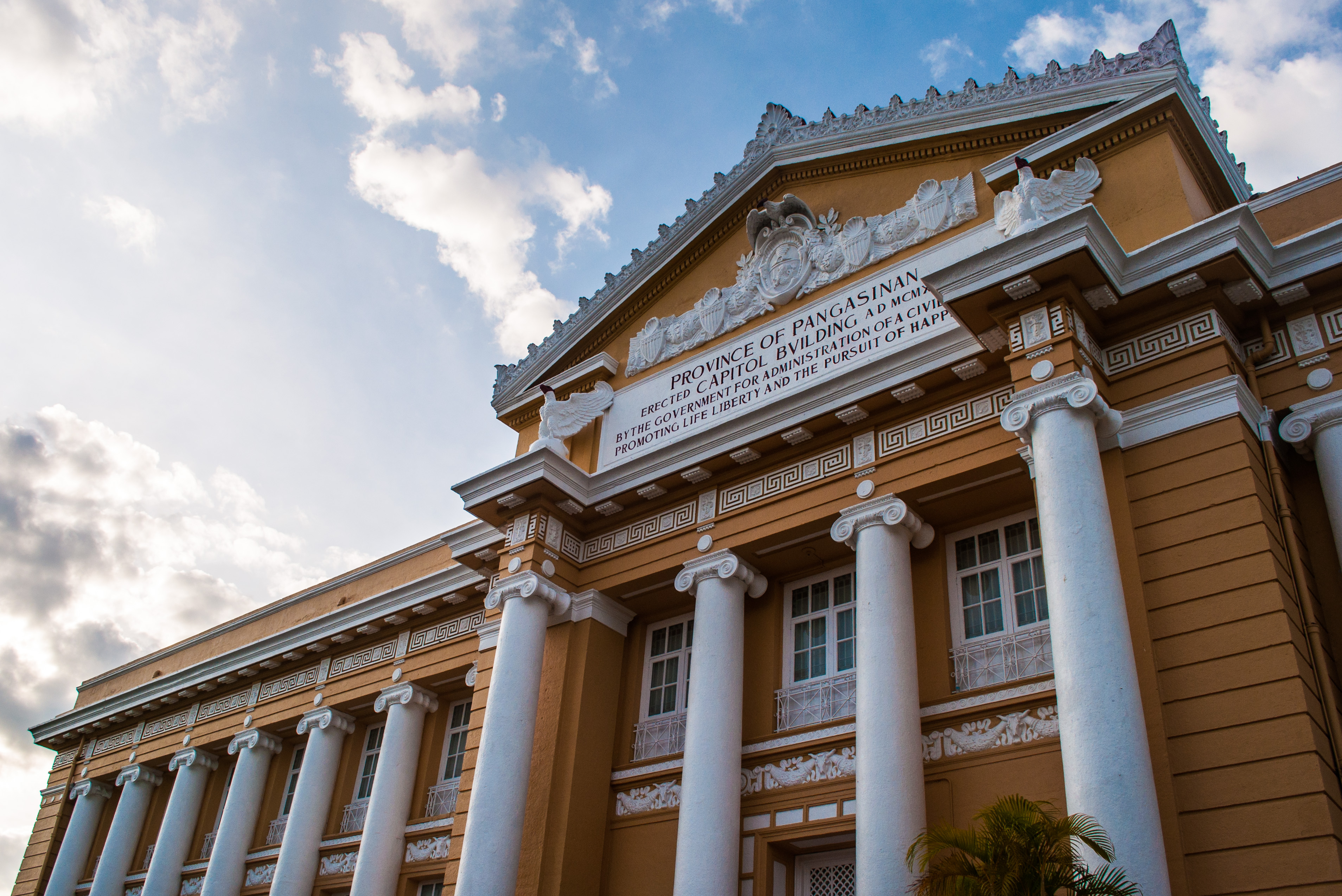
The Provincial Capitol of Pangasinan was the location for the third Pit Stop.

Airdates: October 20–25, 2014

- Taal to Manaoag, Pangasinan (Our Lady of Manaoag Church)
- Dagupan (Magsaysay Fish Market)
- Dagupan (Dagupan City Plaza – Giant Clam Stage)
- Dagupan (Bonuan Blue Beach)
- Dagupan (West Central Elementary School)
- Dagupan (Lyceum-Northwestern University)
- Calasiao (Bella's Calasiao Puto and Pasalubong Center)
- Lingayen (Lingayen Capitol Center)

In this leg's Roadblock, one team member had to ride a marked boat to Magsaysay Fish Market and unload two basins of fish from the boat by crossing a long, thin, wooden plank to receive their next clue from a vendor. If racers dropped their fish in the water, they had to go back to the fish port and get a new batch. If they dropped fish in the water a second time, they would have to serve a short pre-determined time penalty.

This leg's Detour was a choice between Imbestigasyon (Investigation) or Operasyon (Operation). In Imbestigasyon, teams were briefed on how to correctly identify and handle evidence at a crime scene. Afterwards, teams were taken to a mock crime scene and, in addition to drawing a chalk mark around the victim, had to correctly identify items of evidence and number them to receive their next clue. In Operasyon, teams were briefed on the names of various medical instruments. After the briefing, they went to an operating room, where a mock operation was being performed, and had to correctly give five instruments that a doctor asked for to receive their next clue. After each failed attempt at either Detour, teams must attend the briefing again before they could make another attempt. Before leaving the university, teams would find the U-Turn reveal board.

Additional tasks

- At Our Lady of Manaoag Church, teams had to ask stall vendors "May clue ka ba para sa akin?" ("Do you have a clue for me?") until a vendor handed them their next clue, which instructed them to take one of the car keys from inside the same stall and proceed to the back of the church to have a Kia Sportage blessed. Teams had to recite a prayer from memory in front of the priest performing the blessing rite for the car, which then would be their only means of transportation through Leg 5, before receiving their next clue from the priest.
- At the Giant Clam Stage, teams had to vote for the team that they wished to U-Turn. Afterwards, teams had to perform a local Bangus Festival dance with 150 festival performers to the satisfaction of Mayor Belen Fernandez to receive their next clue.
- At Bonuan Blue Beach, teams had to search for the Douglas MacArthur statue to find their next clue, which advised teams that MacArthur could not wait for them and was waiting instead for teams to report for duty at his office leaving them to figure out that MacArthur's old office was at West Central Elementary School.
- At West Central Elementary School, teams had to identify the three items that were not made in the World War II era (candle holder, English Series Philippine one-peso note, and Morse code typewriter) to receive their next clue from a MacArthur lookalike. If teams were incorrect, they had to go back and wait for the rest of the teams to finish before they could try again.
- At Bella's Calasiao Puto and Pasalubong Center, teams had to use sticks to remove puto calasiao from trays until they found one with a marked base, which they could exchange for their next clue.

Additional note

- At the start of the leg, teams traveled by charter bus to their next destination: Manaoag, Pangasinan. The first five teams left on Bus A and the last four on Bus B.

=== Leg 4 (Pangasinan → La Union) ===
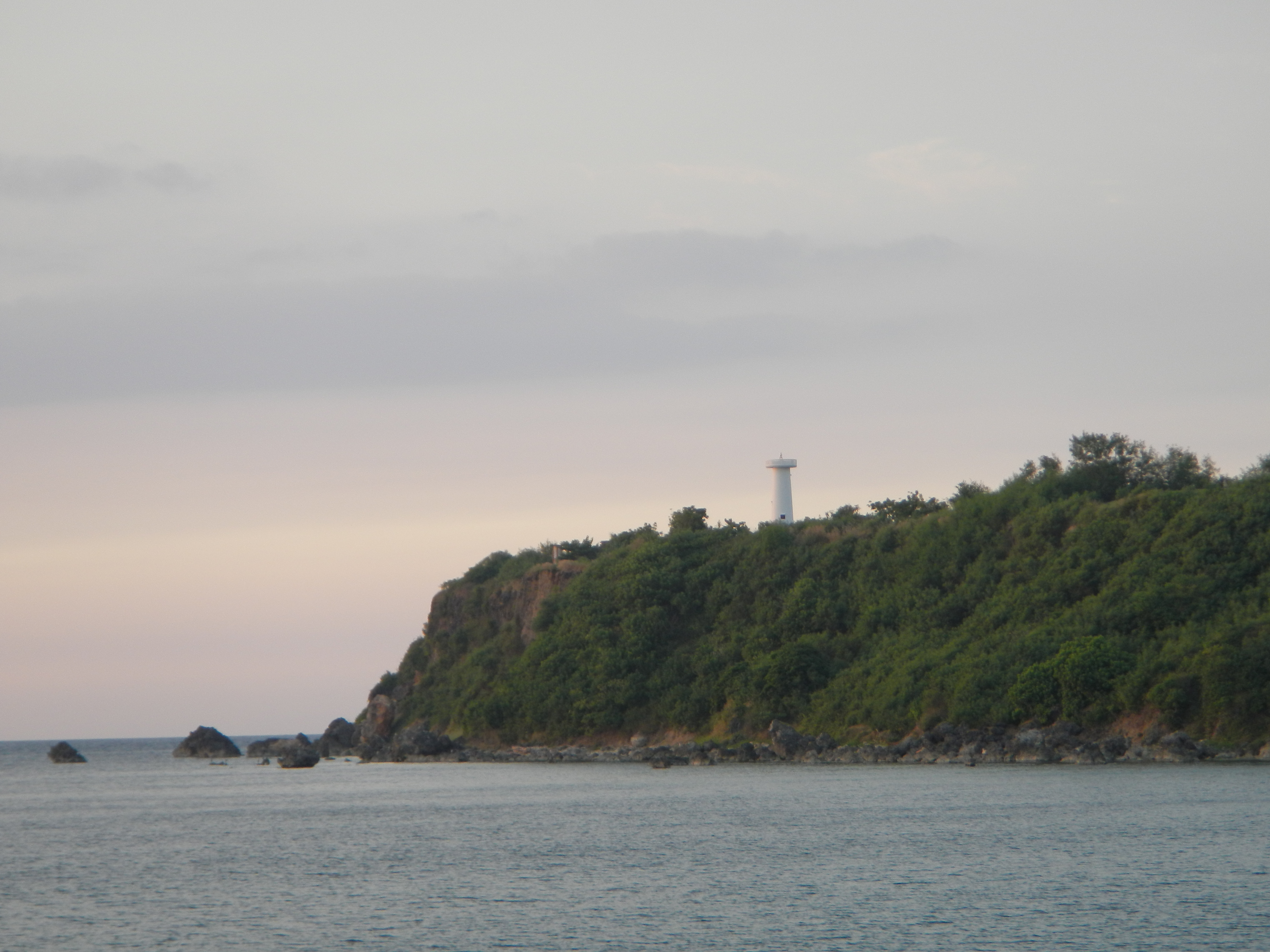
Poro Point in San Fernando was the location for one half of the Detour.

Airdates: October 27–November 1, 2014

- Pugo, La Union (Pugo Adventure Park)
- Agoo (Eagle of the North)
- San Fernando (Poro Point Lighthouse or San Fernando Wet Market)
- San Fernando (Bacsil Ridge)
- San Juan (Red Clay Pottery Craft)
- San Juan (Costa Villa Resort)
- San Fernando (Ganaden's Nook by the Sea)
- San Fernando (Pindangan Ruins)

This leg's Detour was a choice between Brains or Broom. In Brains, one team member had to go to the top of the Poro Point Lighthouse and give directions to their partner so they could solve a brain teaser on the ground below and receive their next clue. In Broom, teams had to drive to the San Fernando Wet Market and find the marked broom vendor, who would give them 20 brooms that they had to sell for ₱120 each to receive their next clue. Before driving from Pugo Adventure Park to their chosen Detour task, teams had to vote for the team that they wished to Yield at Eagle of the North.

In this leg's Roadblock, one team member had to figure out a way to pass through ten rows of surfboards and surfers, where only one surfer in each row would let racers pass while the others would block them, that were guarding the way to their next clue. If racers chose the wrong surfer, they would have to go back to the first row and start again. After three mistakes, racers would have to go to the back of any formed line.

Additional tasks

- At Pugo Adventure Park, teams had to ride the Superman zipline and either drop one ball into any of the inflatable pool targets or two balls into the large swimming pool below to receive their next clue. Teams had only five attempts to complete this challenge.
- At Bacsil Ridge, teams had to don protective gear, enter a forest with "Japanese snipers" from World War II, and retrieve their next clue without getting hit with a paintball pellet. If they were hit, they had to return to the starting point and wait for the other teams to finish before redoing the task.
- At Red Clay Pottery Craft, teams had to successfully deliver an unbaked clay pot, completely intact, to a stand to receive their next clue.
- At Ganaden's Nook by the Sea, teams would find the Yield reveal board. They then had to paddle out to sea on a surfboard to a marked buoy with their next clue.

=== Leg 5 (La Union → Ilocos Sur → Ilocos Norte) ===
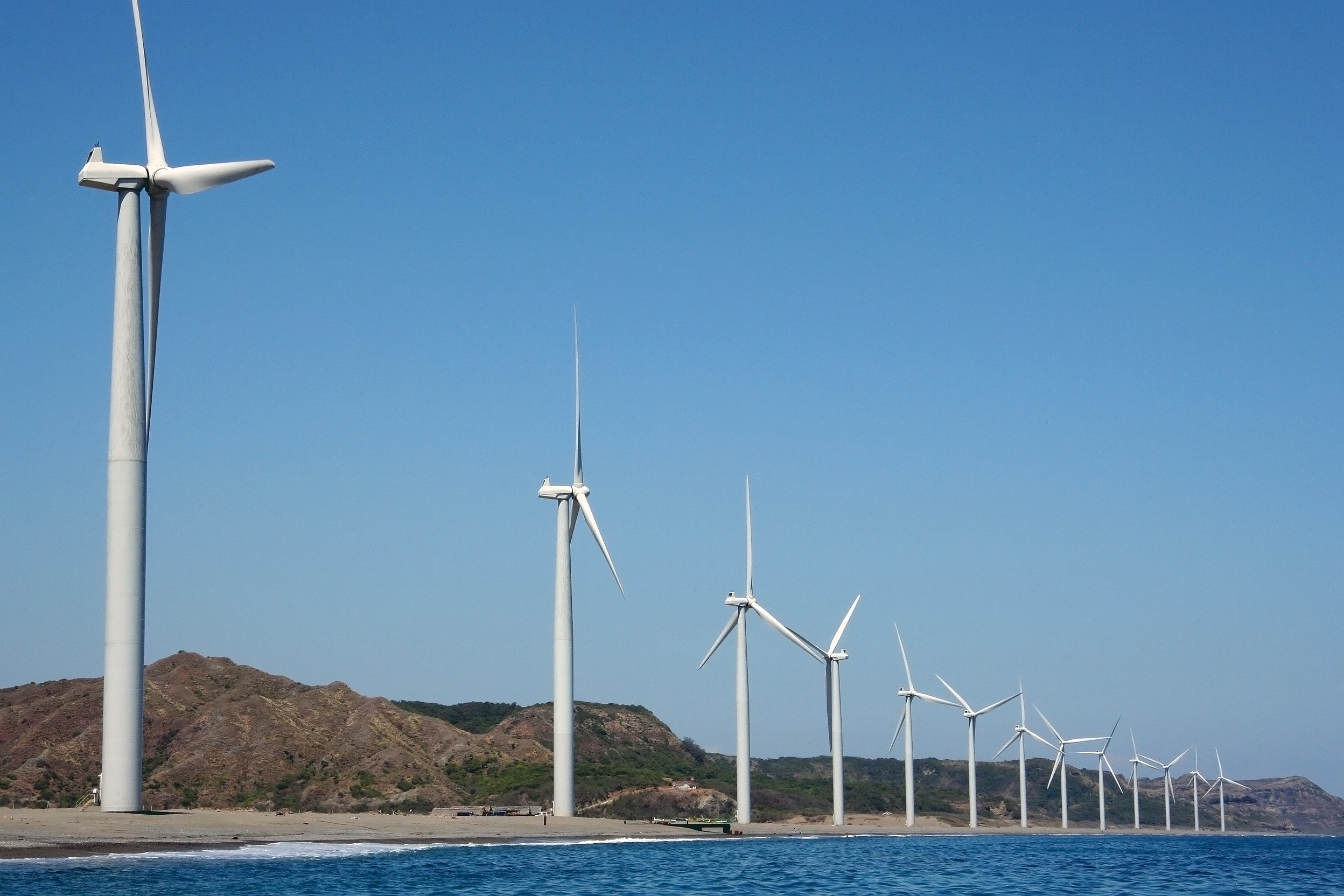
Racers had to search among the Bangui windmills to find their next clue.

Airdates: November 3–8, 2014

- San Fernando (Ganaden's Nook by the Sea) (Pit Start)
- Galimuyod, Ilocos Sur (Barangay Bidbiday Rice Fields)
- Bangui, Ilocos Norte (Amian Cafe)
- Bangui (Bangui Wind Farm)
- Burgos (Kapurpurawan Rock Formation)
- Paoay (Paoay Sand Dunes)
- Laoag (Macy's Diner or Nail Lounge and Massage Salon)
- Laoag (Ilocos Norte Provincial Capitol – Aurora Park)
- Pasuquin (Dhevie Kate's Salt Refinery)
- Paoay (Paoay Church)

In this leg's Roadblock, one team member had to choose a key from a board and use it to unlock the correct door to one of the fourteen windmills containing their next clue. Teams had to vote for the team that they wished to U-Turn before they could proceed to the Roadblock.

This leg's Detour was a choice between Music or Massage. In Music, teams had to travel to Macy's Diner, recruit fifteen people, and perform a song and dance to the satisfaction of the judge to receive their next clue. In Massage, teams had to proceed to Nail Lounge and Massage Salon and endure a painful, ten-minute reflexology foot massage to receive their next clue. At Aurora Park, teams would find the U-Turn reveal board.

Additional tasks

- At Barangay Bidbiday Rice Fields, teams had to guide a carabao and plow through a marked field to find their next clue.
- At the Kapurpurawan Rock Formation, teams had to ride a horse to the challenge area. There, teams had to retrieve rocks from a pile and stack them to a height of 1.5 metres (4.9 ft) before making a wish and receiving their next clue.
- At the Paoay Sand Dunes, teams had to drive quad bikes along an 88-hectare marked course with 20 overturned baskets. Underneath three baskets were teams' next clue while the remaining baskets contained either hourglasses of varying sizes that teams had to overturn and wait for the sand to run out before they could continue or a Rexona pass that guaranteed teams that the next three baskets would not contain their clue.
- At Dhevie Kate's Salt Refinery, teams had to search a salt pan for a tiny crystal with an Amazing Race flag that they could exchange for their next clue.

=== Leg 6 (Ilocos Norte → Cavite → Cebu) ===
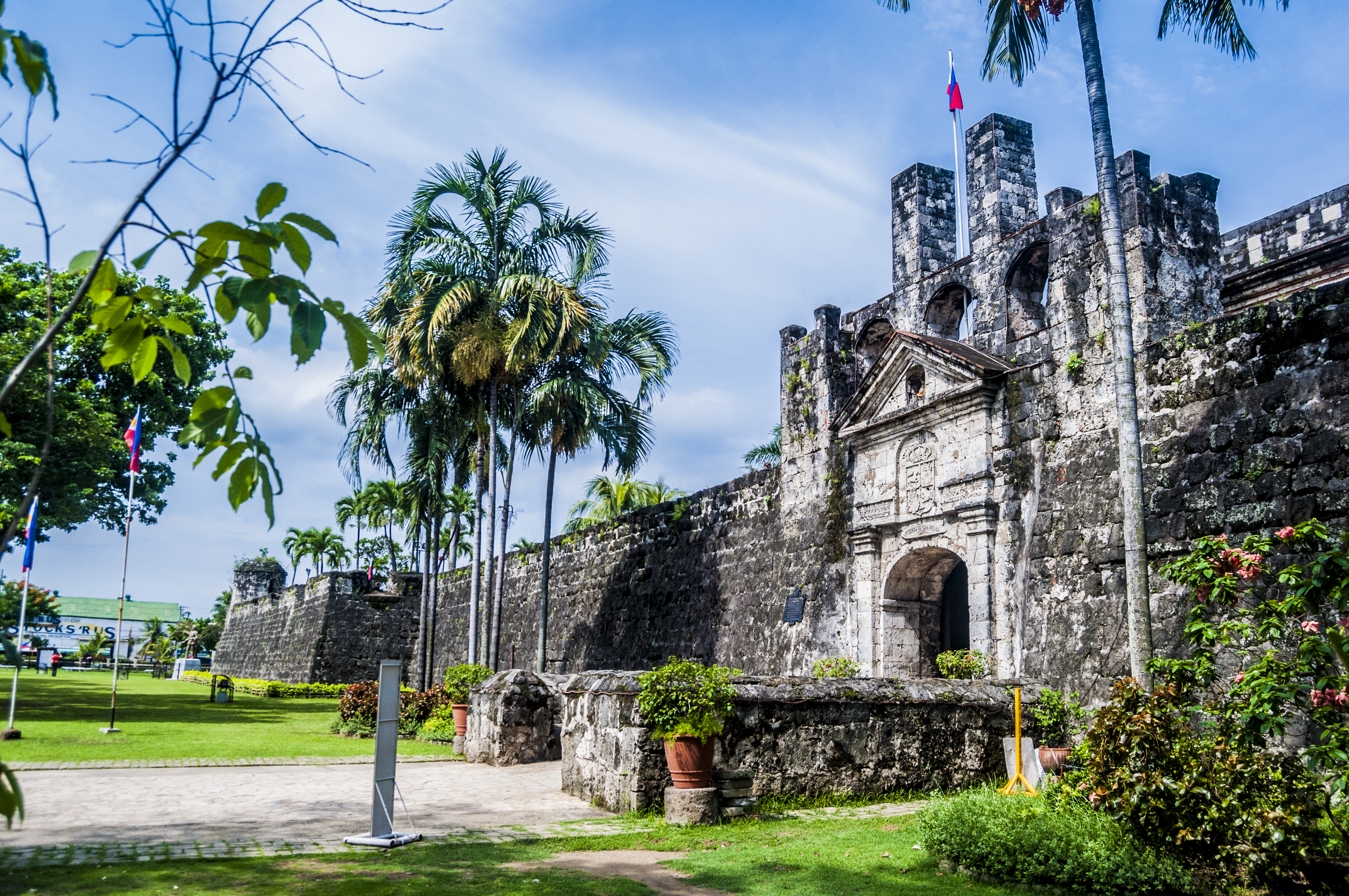
Fort San Pedro was the location for one of the challenges in this leg.

Airdates: November 10–15, 2014

- Laoag (Fariñas Transit Terminal) to Silang, Cavite (RCD Royale Homes)
- Manila, Metro Manila (Ninoy Aquino International Airport) to Cebu City, Cebu (Mactan–Cebu International Airport)
- Cebu City (Parian Monument) (Overnight Rest)
- Balamban (Canso X Adventure Park)
- Cebu City (Fort San Pedro)
- Mandaue (Municipal Hall)
- Mandaue (Boardwalk Complex or Mandaue Public Market)
- Cebu City (Espeleta Street)
- Mactan (Mövenpick Hotel – Ibiza Beach Club)

In this leg's Roadblock, one team member had to pedal a mountain bike through a marked Rexona cross-country trail to receive their next clue.

For this leg's Duel, two teams had to engage in a best of three matches by flipping three giant coins that were split down the middle so that they formed teams' assigned image of Lapu-Lapu or Ferdinand Magellan. The winning team received their next clue while the losing team had to wait for the next team to arrive. The last team was given a photograph of a galleon and had to find a matching model ship before receiving their next clue. Before leaving the fort, teams would find the Yield reveal board.

This leg's Detour was a choice between Martial Art or The Art of Cooking. In Martial Art, teams had to travel to Boardwalk Complex and learn an Escrima martial arts routine consisting of fourteen moves to receive their next clue from the Escrima Grand Master. In The Art of Cooking, teams had to travel to Mandaue Public Market and make Pusô rice pockets to the satisfaction of the vendor to receive their next clue.

Additional tasks

- At RCD Royale Homes, teams had to choose a model home and assemble a kitchen cabinet using the manual provided. Once it was approved by engineer Jun Todio, they then worked with the RCD staff to hang the kitchen cabinet on the wall and paint it to receive their next clue from RCD chairman Roland C. Delantar.
- At the Parian Monument, teams had to figure out that they had to relay the message of a sign – "Bawal umakyat sa itaas!!! Pumunta ng Canso X, bawal magtapon ng basura" ("Don't go up!!! Go to Canso X, don't throw the garbage") – to the guard standing at the monument's entrance to receive their next clue, which instructed them to vote for the team that they wished to Yield then place their names on the sign-up board.
- At Espeleta Street, teams had to enter a colorful Sinulog festival street parade, photograph three performers wearing different costumes, and show the pictures to the Queen of the Sinulog Festival to receive their next clue. Only three teams could enter at a time.

Additional note

- At Fariñas Transit Terminal, teams had to sign up for one of two charter buses leaving two hours apart to RCD Royale Homes in Silang, Cavite. The first bus departed at 11:00 p.m. with three teams, and the second bus departed two hours later with the remaining four teams.

=== Leg 7 (Cebu → Bohol) ===
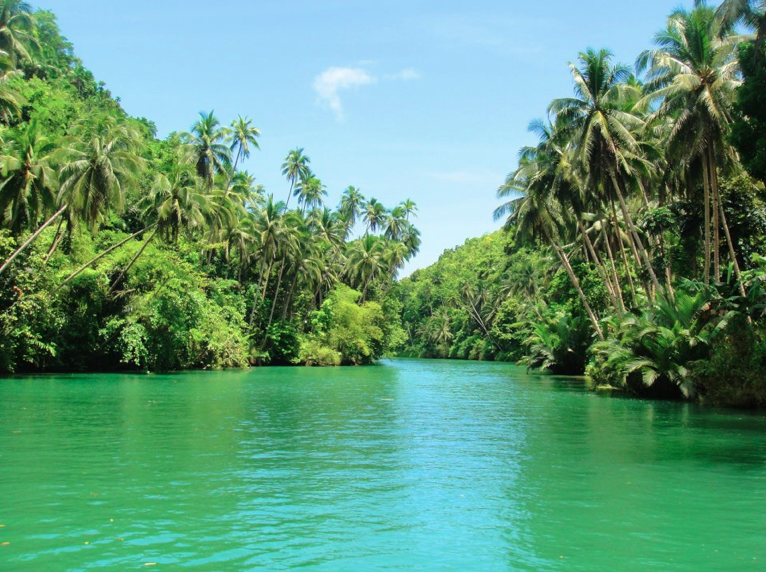
Loboc River served as location for the "Paddle" Detour choice.

Airdates: November 17–22, 2014

- Lapu-Lapu City (Lapu-Lapu City Hall) (Pit Start)
- Cebu City (Port of Cebu) to Tagbilaran, Bohol (Port of Tagbilaran)
- Tagbilaran (K of C Drive)
- Tagbilaran (Carlos P. Garcia Memorial Park)
- Baclayon (Bohol Wildlife Park)
- Loboc (Loboc River) or Loay (CDO Ice Plant)
- Loboc (Jumbo Bridge)
- Sevilla (Sipatan River Hanging Bridge)
- Panglao (Bohol Beach Club)
- Panglao (South Palms Resort)

In this leg's Roadblock, one team member had to play a traditional fiesta carnival game. They had to place three cubes that were colored differently on each side atop a hanging plane and pull a string to release the cubes onto a game board. All three cubes had to land on the board so that their top sides matched the colors on the bottom of the board twice for teams to receive their next clue.

This leg's Detour was a choice between Paddle or Ice. In Paddle, teams had to travel to Loboc River and paddle 2.3 kilometres (1.4 mi) while standing on a paddleboard to retrieve their next clue hanging from a tree. In Ice, teams had to travel to CDO Ice Plant and retrieve their next clue encased within a large block of ice. Teams were given an assortment of unusual tools and would be given an ice pick if unsuccessful after 40 minutes.

Additional tasks

- At K of C Drive, teams would discover that they had to run to their next clue while being pelted with colored Holi powder. Before starting the task, teams had to take a number from the gate to determine the order that they would run and then vote for the team that they wished to Yield.
- The clue teams received after the Roadblock told them to find their next clue "underneath the fourth president of the Third Republic of the Philippines". Teams were left to figure out that their next clue was at Carlos P. Garcia Memorial Park at the foot of a statue of the park's namesake.
- At Bohol Wildlife Park, one team member had to retrieve their next clue from beneath a python in a snake enclosure while their partner lifted the python.
- At Jumbo Bridge, teams found their next clue, which instructed them to take twelve coconuts to the Sipatan River bamboo hanging bridge. There, teams would find the Yield reveal board. Then, both team members had to carry six coconuts across the bridge without dropping them; otherwise they would have to start over. Once across, the "Buko King" would surprise teams by peeling a coconut's skin with his teeth before giving them their next clue.
- At Bohol Beach Club, teams had to decide which team member would perform the task first. The chosen team member then had to cross one of two available hammock trails that were situated between the palm trees without falling on the ground. The second team member had to do the same task with a faster time to receive their next clue, which instructed teams to follow a marked trail to the Pit Stop at South Palms Resort.

=== Leg 8 (Bohol → Iloilo) ===
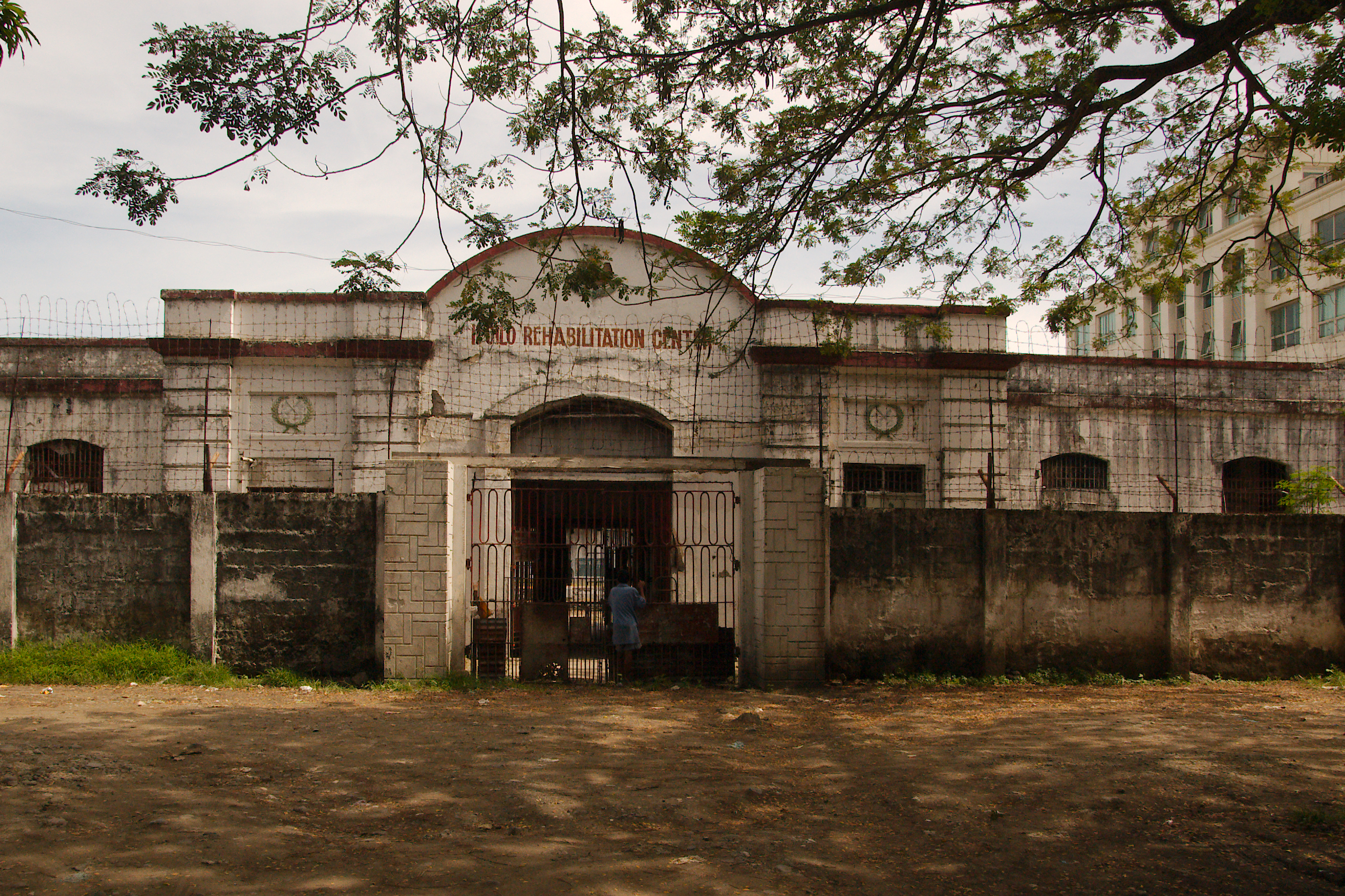
At the old Iloilo Rehabilitation Center, teams had to find their next clue without being stickered by "zombies".

Airdates: November 24–29, 2014

- Tagbilaran (Port of Tagbilaran) to Iloilo City, Iloilo (Port of Iloilo)
- Pavia (Pavia National High School)
- Iloilo City (La Paz Public Market – Netong's Original Special La Paz Batchoy)
- Oton (Sunset Royal Beach Resort)
- Iloilo City (Mandurriao Public Market)
- Iloilo City (Mandurriao Plaza – Espousal of Our Lady Parish)
- Iloilo City (Plazoleta Gay)
- Iloilo City (Regent Theatre)
- Iloilo City (Pison Avenue – Construction Site at San Rafael Road)
- Iloilo City (Old Iloilo Rehabilitation Center)
- Iloilo City (Injap Tower Hotel – Helipad)

In this leg's Roadblock, which was also a Duel, one team member had to choose a carabao and jockey and ride a wooden chariot along a course. Team members had to grab three flags and then a fourth flag when crossing the finish line. The racer who grabbed more flags or, if both racers grabbed all the flags, crossed the finish line first, received their next clue while the losing racer had to run again. The last losing racer had to beat a local champion to receive their next clue. After the Roadblock, teams had to vote for the team that they wished to U-Turn.

This leg's Detour was a choice between Bamboo or Bicycle. In Bamboo, teams had to deliver two bamboo poles to a marked drop-off area inside the market to receive their next clue. Teams were not allowed to carry only one pole at a time. In Bicycle, teams had to travel by pedicab to Mandurriao Public Market, pick up a lady waiting for them outside the market, and take her to her destination, along with all of the things she bought, to receive their next clue. At Mandurriao Plaza, teams would find the U-Turn reveal board.

Additional tasks

- At Netong's Original Special La Paz Batchoy, both team members had to eat one serving of La Paz Batchoy. After eating, teams were left to figure out that their next clue was in the form of a small printed advertisement plastered on the glass window of the restaurant: the Sunset Royal Beach Resort at Anhawan, Oton.
- At Sunset Royal Beach Resort, teams encountered an Intersection. After pairing up, teams had to participate in a local tradition of the Iloilo Paraw Regatta Festival: body painting. Two team members had to paint the body of a member of a different team to the judge's satisfaction to receive their next clue, after which teams were no longer Intersected.
- At Plazoleta Gay, teams had to put on sleeping masks and then ask the help of local bystanders to guide them along J.M. Basa Street to the Regent Theatre, where Tammy and Marvi, a pair of blind students, would give them their next clue.
- At Pison Avenue, teams had to correctly answer three questions related to rock music by placing provided rocks on their chosen answer on the answer mat. If they got all three questions right, they receive their next clue, which was on the ground in front of them. However, if they got any answer wrong, a dump truck would unload rocks and gravel, burying the clue in front of them which they would then have to then dig through to retrieve it.
- At the Iloilo Rehabilitation Center, teams would find out that the Pit Stop had been "abandoned" due to a sudden infestation of zombies and had to cross the compound to reach their next clue listing the new Pit Stop, now located at the helipad on Injap Tower. If racers were "infected" by zombies by being plastered with stickers, they had to drink a bottle of "antidote" before trying again.

=== Leg 9 (Iloilo → Misamis Oriental & Bukidnon) ===
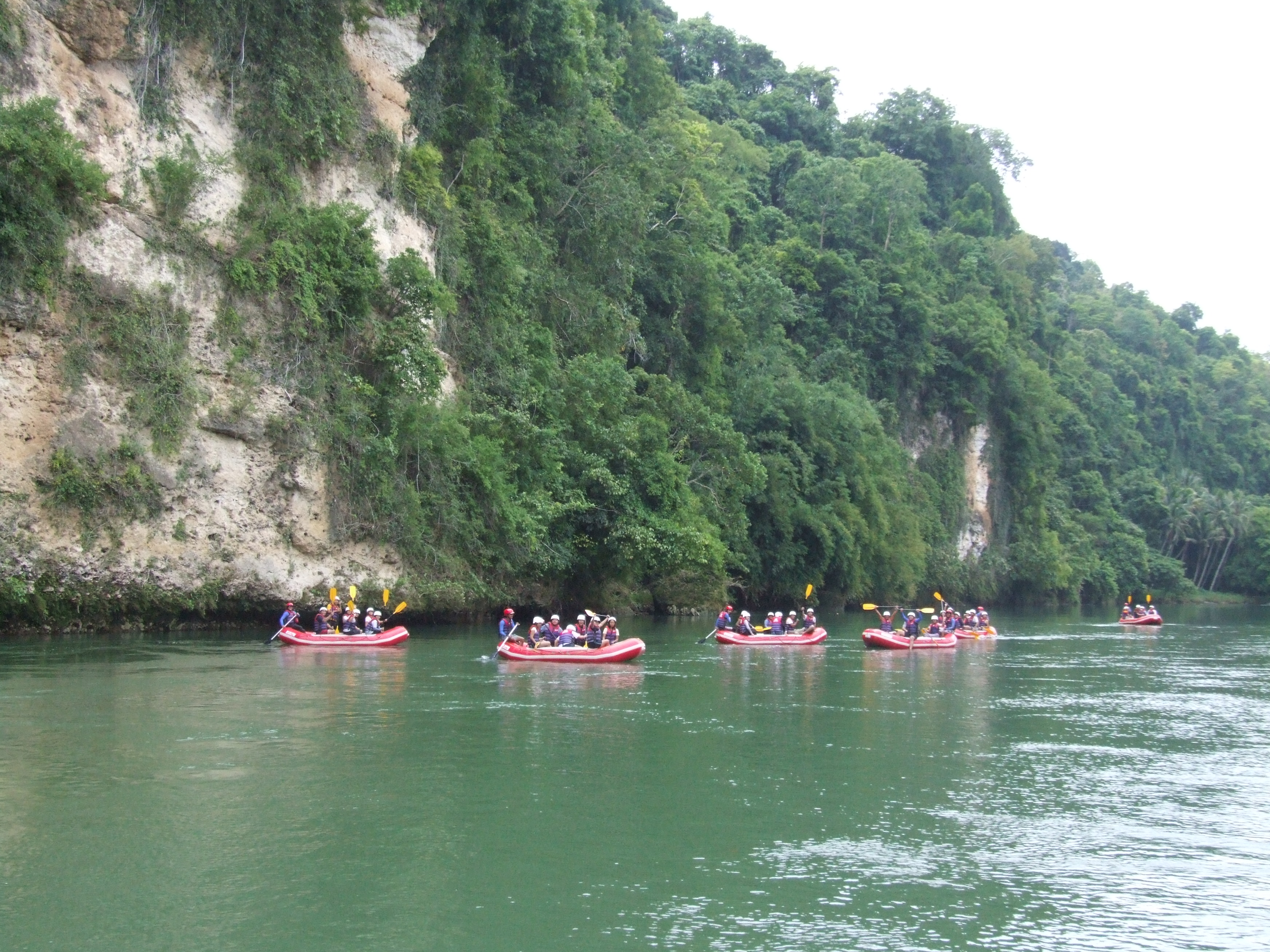
In Misamis Oriental, teams had to whitewater raft down the Cagayan de Oro River.

Airdates: December 1–6, 2014

- Iloilo (Iloilo International Airport) to Laguindingan, Misamis Oriental (Laguindingan Airport)
- El Salvador (Divine Mercy Shrine)
- El Salvador (Madelicious Bakery) (Overnight Rest)
- Laguindingan (Oyster Hill – St. Michael's Ilogon Poultry and Dairy Farm) or Opol (Philippine Ostrich and Crocodile Farms)
- Cagayan de Oro (Cagayan de Oro River)
- Manolo Fortich, Bukidnon (Kampo Juan Eco-Adventure Farm)
- Cagayan de Oro, Misamis Oriental (Gardens of Malasag Eco-Tourism Village)
- Cagayan de Oro (Mapawa Nature Park)

This season's final Detour was a choice between Milk It or Herd It. In Milk It, teams had to milk a cow until the milk reached a line on the inside of a wooden bucket to receive their next clue. In Herd It, teams had to herd a flock of ostriches into one of the corrals to receive their next clue.

For this season's final Duel, two teams had to compete in a best of three matches. One member of each team had to pedal an anicycle 120 metres (390 ft) across a high-wire. The first team to win two matches would receive their next clue while the losing team had to wait for another team. The last losing team had to perform a penalty by biking the whole course before receiving their next clue. After this task, teams would find the Yield reveal board.

In this leg's Roadblock, one team member had to cross a 395-foot (120 m) hanging bridge while memorizing a series of numbers along the way. They then had to unlock all four combination locks on a door using the numbers in the same order that they encountered them to retrieve their next clue.

Additional tasks

- At the Divine Mercy Shrine, teams had to count the number of steps to reach the top and write the correct number of steps on a chalkboard to receive their next clue from the priest. Teams then to write the Ten Commandments on a wooden tablet and recite them in front of a choir. The choir's singing voices would determine whether they had written the Ten Commandments correctly to receive their next clue.
- At the Madelicious Bakery, teams had to vote for the team that they wished to Yield and then place their names on the sign-up board. In the morning, teams had to eat pastel until they found one with red custard filling, which they could exchange with the manager for their next clue.
- At the Cagayan de Oro River, teams had whitewater raft through raging rapids with two guides and grab their next clue hanging from a bridge. If teams missed the clue, they had to backtrack to a flag checkpoint and try again.
- At Gardens of Malasag Eco-Tourism Village, one team member had to answer five questions, and their partner had to match the answers to receive their next clue.

Questions	Answers			
Questions	Jet & Yna	Kelvin & JP	Matt & Phoebe	Roch & Eji
Which team helped you the least?	Tina & Avy	Matt & Phoebe	Jet & Yna	Daniel & Charlie
Which team lied to you?	Matt & Phoebe	AJ & Jody	Jet & Yna	AJ & Jody
Which team has the best teamwork?	Jet & Yna	Kelvin & JP	Roch & Eji	Matt & Phoebe
Whose relationship are you jealous of?	Vince & Ed	Jet & Yna	Daniel & Charlie	Jet & Yna
Which team is the most unlucky?	Matt & Phoebe	Zarah & Osang	Zarah & Osang	Zarah & Osang

Additional note

- During the Pit Stop before the leg began, teams could call their loved ones back home.

=== Leg 10 (Misamis Oriental → Camiguin) ===
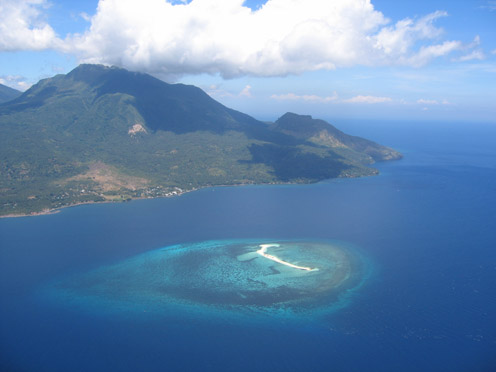
White Beach Island in Camiguin served as the Finish Line of The Amazing Race Philippines 2.

Airdate: December 7, 2014

- Balingoan (Balingoan Ferry Terminal) to Mahinog, Camiguin (Benoni Port)
- Guinsiliban (Kibila White Beach – Giant Clam Sanctuary)
- Catarman (Tuasan Falls)
- Catarman (Sunken Cemetery)
- Catarman (Old Church Ruins)
- Mahinog (Mantigue Island)
- Mambajao (White Beach Island)

In this season's final Roadblock, one team member had to take a boat to the Sunken Cemetery, where they had two minutes to memorize eight alibata symbols inside the monument. The team member then had to run to the Old Church Ruins, where they would encounter an eight layered column and had to align the alibata symbols to the order that they appeared in the monument to receive their next clue.

Additional tasks

- At the Giant Clam Sanctuary, teams found their next clue, which instructed them to put on snorkeling gear, swim to a marked buoy, and then dive ten feet underwater to retrieve a giant white pearl from inside a clam that they could exchange for their next clue back on shore.
- At Tuasan Falls, one team member had to rappel down the waterfall, collect several puzzle pieces, and hand the pieces over to their partner, who would place them inside a bag while rappelling alongside them. Once teams had all the pieces and returned to the ground, a local would hand them a puzzle board, and teams had to fill in the missing parts with the puzzle pieces to receive their next clue.
- At Mantigue Island, teams had to search through several clue boxes until they find one containing their final clue.

== Television ratings ==
Television ratings for the second season of The Amazing Race Philippines on TV5 collected by two firms: AGB Nielsen and Kantar Media. AGB Nielsen's survey ratings were gathered from Mega Manila households, while Kantar Media's survey ratings were gathered from urban and rural households all over the Philippines.

Episode		Original airdate	Timeslot (PST)	AGB Nielsen			Kantar Media			Source
Episode		Original airdate	Timeslot (PST)	Rating	Timeslot	Primetime	Rating	Timeslot	Primetime	Source
1	"Leg 1 – season premiere"	October 6, 2014	Monday 7:00 p.m.	3.6%	#3	<#10	1.9%	#3	<#10	
2	"Leg 1 – part 2"	October 7, 2014	Tuesday 7:00 p.m.	3.5%	#3	<#10	1.8%	#3	<#10	
3	"Leg 1 – part 3"	October 8, 2014	Wednesday 7:00 p.m.	3.1%	#3	<#10	1.1%	#3	<#10	
4	"Leg 1 – part 4"	October 9, 2014	Thursday 7:00 p.m.	3.2%	#3	<#10	1.7%	#3	<#10	
5	"Leg 1 – part 5"	October 10, 2014	Friday 7:00 p.m.	3.2%	#3	<#10	1.6%	#3	<#10	
6	"Leg 1 – pit stop"	October 11, 2014	Saturday 9:00 p.m.	2.6%	#3	<#10	Unavailable	#3	<#10	
7	"Leg 1 week recap"	October 12, 2014	Sunday 9:00 p.m.	3.0%	#3	<#10	1.6%	#3	<#10	
8	"Leg 2 – part 1"	October 13, 2014	Monday 7:00 p.m.	3.5%	#3	<#10	2.0%	#3	<#10	
9	"Leg 2 – part 2"	October 14, 2014	Tuesday 7:00 p.m.	3.1%	#3	<#10	1.5%	#3	<#10	
10	"Leg 2 – part 3"	October 15, 2014	Wednesday 7:00 p.m.	3.6%	#3	<#10	1.4%	#3	<#10	
11	"Leg 2 – part 4"	October 16, 2014	Thursday 7:00 p.m.	3.7%	#3	<#10	1.6%	#3	<#10	
12	"Leg 2 – part 5"	October 17, 2014	Friday 7:00 p.m.	4.6%	#3	<#10	2.3%	#3	<#10	
13	"Leg 2 – pit stop"	October 18, 2014	Saturday 9:00 p.m.	3.7%	#3	<#10	1.3%	#3	<#10	
14	"Leg 2 week recap"	October 19, 2014	Sunday 9:00 p.m.	3.2%	#3	<#10	1.7%	#3	<#10	
15	"Leg 3 – part 1"	October 20, 2014	Monday 9:00 p.m.	3.7%	#3	<#10	2.0%	#3	<#10	
16	"Leg 3 – part 2"	October 21, 2014	Tuesday 9:00 p.m.	5.4%	#3	<#10	2.2%	#3	<#10	
17	"Leg 3 – part 3"	October 22, 2014	Wednesday 9:00 p.m.	4.8%	#3	<#10	2.7%	#3	<#10	
18	"Leg 3 – part 4"	October 23, 2014	Thursday 9:00 p.m.	4.0%	#3	<#10	1.7%	#3	<#10	
19	"Leg 3 – part 5"	October 24, 2014	Friday 9:00 p.m.	3.9%	#3	<#10	1.7%	#3	<#10	
20	"Leg 3 – pit stop"	October 25, 2014	Saturday 9:00 p.m.	2.3%	#3	<#10	1.4%	#3	<#10	
21	"Leg 3 week recap"	October 26, 2014	Sunday 9:00 p.m.	2.2%	#3	<#10	0.8%	#3	<#10	
22	"Leg 4 — part 1"	October 27, 2014	Monday 9:00 p.m.	3.9%	#3	<#10	2.1%	#3	<#10	
23	"Leg 4 — part 2"	October 28, 2014	Tuesday 9:00 p.m.	4.5%	#3	<#10	2.2%	#3	<#10	
24	"Leg 4 — part 3"	October 29, 2014	Wednesday 9:00 p.m.	5.1%	#3	<#10	1.9%	#3	<#10	
25	"Leg 4 — part 4"	October 30, 2014	Thursday 9:00 p.m.	3.9%	#3	<#10	1.7%	#3	<#10	
26	"Leg 4 — part 5"	October 31, 2014	Friday 9:00 p.m.	4.5%	#3	<#10	2.4%	#3	<#10	
27	"Leg 4 — pit stop"	November 1, 2014	Saturday 9:00 p.m.	3.6%	#3	<#10	1.3%	#3	<#10	
28	"Leg 4 week recap"	November 2, 2014	Sunday 9:00 p.m.	3.5%	#3	<#10	1.2%	#3	<#10	
29	"Leg 5 — part 1"	November 3, 2014	Monday 9:00 p.m.	3.8%	#3	<#10	1.9%	#3	<#10	
30	"Leg 5 — part 2"	November 4, 2014	Tuesday 9:00 p.m.	4.2%	#3	<#10	2.2%	#3	<#10	
31	"Leg 5 — part 3"	November 5, 2014	Wednesday 9:00 p.m.	4.3%	#3	<#10	2.2%	#3	<#10	
32	"Leg 5 — part 4"	November 6, 2014	Thursday 9:00 p.m.	4.0%	#3	<#10	2.3%	#3	<#10	
33	"Leg 5 — part 5"	November 7, 2014	Friday 9:00 p.m.	3.9%	#3	<#10	1.7%	#3	<#10	
34	"Leg 5 — pit stop"	November 8, 2014	Saturday 9:00 p.m.	2.8%	#3	<#10	1.0%	#3	<#10	
35	"Leg 5 week recap"	November 9, 2014	Sunday 9:00 p.m.	2.2%	#3	<#10	1.0%	#3	<#10	
36	"Leg 6 — part 1"	November 10, 2014	Monday 9:00 p.m.	3.3%	#3	<#10	2.0%	#3	<#10	
37	"Leg 6 — part 2"	November 11, 2014	Tuesday 9:00 p.m.	4.3%	#3	<#10	1.6%	#3	<#10	
38	"Leg 6 — part 3"	November 12, 2014	Wednesday 9:00 p.m.	4.3%	#3	<#10	1.7%	#3	<#10	
39	"Leg 6 — part 4"	November 13, 2014	Thursday 9:00 p.m.	4.4%	#3	<#10	2.1%	#3	<#10	
40	"Leg 6 — part 5"	November 14, 2014	Friday 9:00 p.m.	3.1%	#3	<#10	1.6%	#3	<#10	
41	"Leg 6 — pit stop"	November 15, 2014	Saturday 9:00 p.m.	2.8%	#3	<#10	1.0%	#3	<#10	
42	"Leg 6 week recap"	November 16, 2014	Sunday 9:00 p.m.	1.9%	#3	<#10	0.8%	#3	<#10	
43	"Leg 7 — part 1"	November 17, 2014	Monday 9:00 p.m.	4.3%	#3	<#10	1.8%	#3	<#10	
44	"Leg 7 — part 2"	November 18, 2014	Tuesday 9:00 p.m.	3.1%	#3	<#10	1.9%	#3	<#10	
45	"Leg 7 — part 3"	November 19, 2014	Wednesday 9:00 p.m.	4.3%	#3	<#10	2.1%	#3	<#10	
46	"Leg 7 — part 4"	November 20, 2014	Thursday 9:00 p.m.	3.6%	#3	<#10	2.0%	#3	<#10	
47	"Leg 7 — part 5"	November 21, 2014	Friday 9:00 p.m.	4.5%	#3	<#10	2.5%	#3	<#10	
48	"Leg 7 — pit stop"	November 22, 2014	Saturday 9:00 p.m.	2.4%	#3	<#10	1.4%	#3	<#10	
49	"Leg 7 week recap"	November 23, 2014	Sunday 9:00 p.m.	2.5%	#3	<#10	1.2%	#3	<#10	
50	"Leg 8 — part 1"	November 24, 2014	Monday 9:00 p.m.	5.1%	#3	<#10	3.2%	#3	<#10	
51	"Leg 8 — part 2"	November 25, 2014	Tuesday 9:00 p.m.	3.5%	#3	<#10	2.2%	#3	<#10	
52	"Leg 8 — part 3"	November 26, 2014	Wednesday 9:00 p.m.	3.7%	#3	<#10	3.2%	#3	<#10	
53	"Leg 8 — part 4"	November 27, 2014	Thursday 9:00 p.m.	3.4%	#3	<#10	2.1%	#3	<#10	
54	"Leg 8 — part 5"	November 28, 2014	Friday 9:00 p.m.	4.0%	#3	<#10	2.8%	#3	<#10	
55	"Leg 8 — pit stop"	November 29, 2014	Saturday 9:00 p.m.	2.9%	#3	<#10	1.4%	#3	<#10	
56	"Leg 8 week recap"	November 30, 2014	Sunday 9:00 p.m.	2.3%	#3	<#10	0.9%	#3	<#10	
57	"Leg 9 — part 1"	December 1, 2014	Monday 9:00 p.m.	3.9%	#3	<#10	2.4%	#3	<#10	
58	"Leg 9 — part 2"	December 2, 2014	Tuesday 9:00 p.m.	4.9%	#3	<#10	2.6%	#3	<#10	
59	"Leg 9 — part 3"	December 3, 2014	Wednesday 9:00 p.m.	5.1%	#3	<#10	3.2%	#3	<#10	
60	"Leg 9 — part 4"	December 4, 2014	Thursday 9:00 p.m.	3.6%	#3	<#10	2.2%	#3	<#10	
61	"Leg 9 — part 5"	December 5, 2014	Friday 9:00 p.m.	4.1%	#3	<#10	2.3%	#3	<#10	
62	"Leg 9 — pit stop & race highlights" (1 hour)	December 6, 2014	Saturday 9:00 p.m.	2.9%	#3	<#10	1.1%	#3	<#10	
63	"Leg 10 — 1 hour finale"	December 7, 2014	Sunday 9:00 p.m.	3.6%	#3	<#10	1.8%	#3	<#10	
