= List of The Amazing Race Philippines contestants =

This is a list of contestants who have appeared on The Amazing Race Philippines, a Philippine reality competition show based on the American series, The Amazing Race. A total of 44 contestants have appeared in the series.

== Contestants ==
Season	Name	Age	Occupation	Finish	Source
1	Crystel Castro	25	Customer service representative	11th	
1	Mykey Lacson	33	Customer service representative	11th	
1	Anton del Rosario	30	Football player	10th	
1	Armand del Rosario	33	Businessman, football player	10th	
1	Pamela Spella	41	Beauty therapist	9th	
1	Vanessa Ishitani	35	Businesswoman	9th	
1	Danielle "Dani" Castaño	22	Beauty Queen, model	8th	
1	Michelle "Mish" van Ruyven	23	Freelance host, entrepreneur	8th	
1	Edgar "Ed" Movido	47	Publisher	7th	
1	Angelica "Angel" Movido	22	Host, news anchor	7th	
1	Raymund "Boom" Vergara	27	TV talent	6th	
1	Cheng Enriquez	40	Entrepreneur	6th	
1	Saida Diola	24	TV personality	5th	
1	Jervi Li	22	Floor director, writer	5th	
1	Sheena Vera Cruz	27	Dancer, choreographer	4th	
1	Gazelle "Gee" Canlas	24	TV host, actress	4th	
1	Marc Duñgo	42	Fitness educator, model	3rd	
1	Katherine "Kat" Tan	27	Commercial marketer	3rd	
1	Fausto Reyes	33	Taxi driver	2nd	
1	Dayal Chowdary, Jr.	25	Model, Actor, aspiring chef	2nd	
1	Lari Jeanne "LJ" Moreno	31	Cake shop owner, actress	1st	
1	Criselda Janice "CJ" Jaravata	29	Actress	1st	
2	Zarah Evangelista	24	Nurse	11th	
2	Rosanna "Osang" Dela Rosa	25	Nurse	11th	
2	Luz McClitton	36	Bodybuilder, gym trainer	10th	
2	Gretchen Abaniel	28	Boxer, gym trainer	10th	
2	Daniel Marsh	25	Model, TV personality	9th	
2	Charlie Sutcliffe	25	Model, TV personality	9th	
2	Tina Wells	26	Model	8th	
2	Avy Wells	22	Model	8th	
2	Romyreen "RR" Enriquez	30	TV personality	7th	
2	Jeck Maierhofer	28	TV talent	7th	
2	Vincent Yu	24	UP Diliman alumni, civic worker	6th	
2	Ed Manguan	21	UP Diliman student, civic worker	6th	
2	AJ Saliba	52	Coach, Retired baseball player	5th	
2	Jody Saliba	21	Baseball player, Student	5th	
2	Jet Cruz	29	Businessman	4th	
2	Yna Cruz	28	Corporate employee	4th	
2	Elijah "Eji" Estillore	29	Chef, Culinary Studies program head	3rd	
2	Rochelle "Roch" Hernandez	34	Pastry chef	3rd	
2	John Paul "JP" Duray	25	Former TV pageant contestant	2nd	
2	Kelvin Engles	23	Former TV pageant contestant	2nd	
2	Matthew "Matt" Edwards	22	Commercial Model	1st	
2	Phoebe Walker	21	Commercial Model	1st	

== Gallery ==
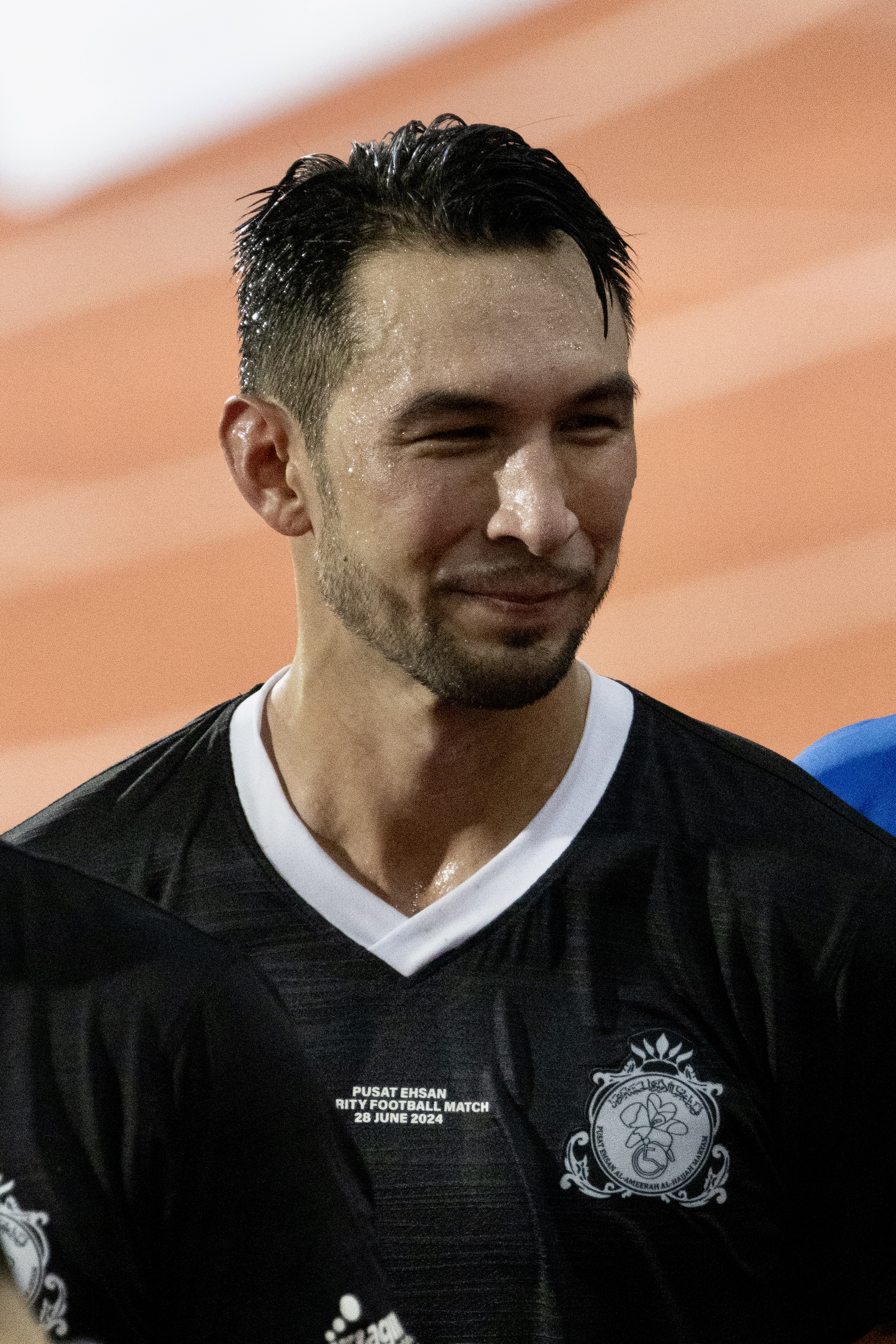
Anton del Rosario from The Amazing Race Philippines 1

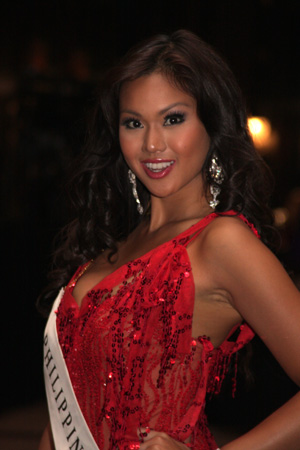
Danielle "Dani" Castaño from The Amazing Race Philippines 1

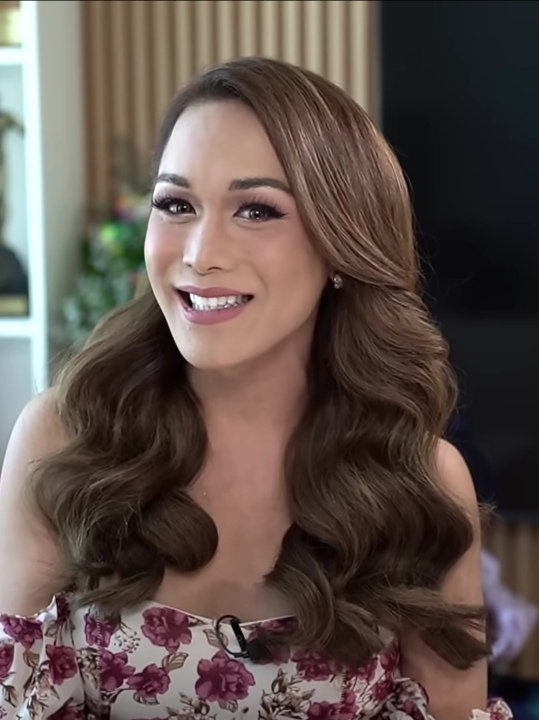
Jervi Li from The Amazing Race Philippines 1

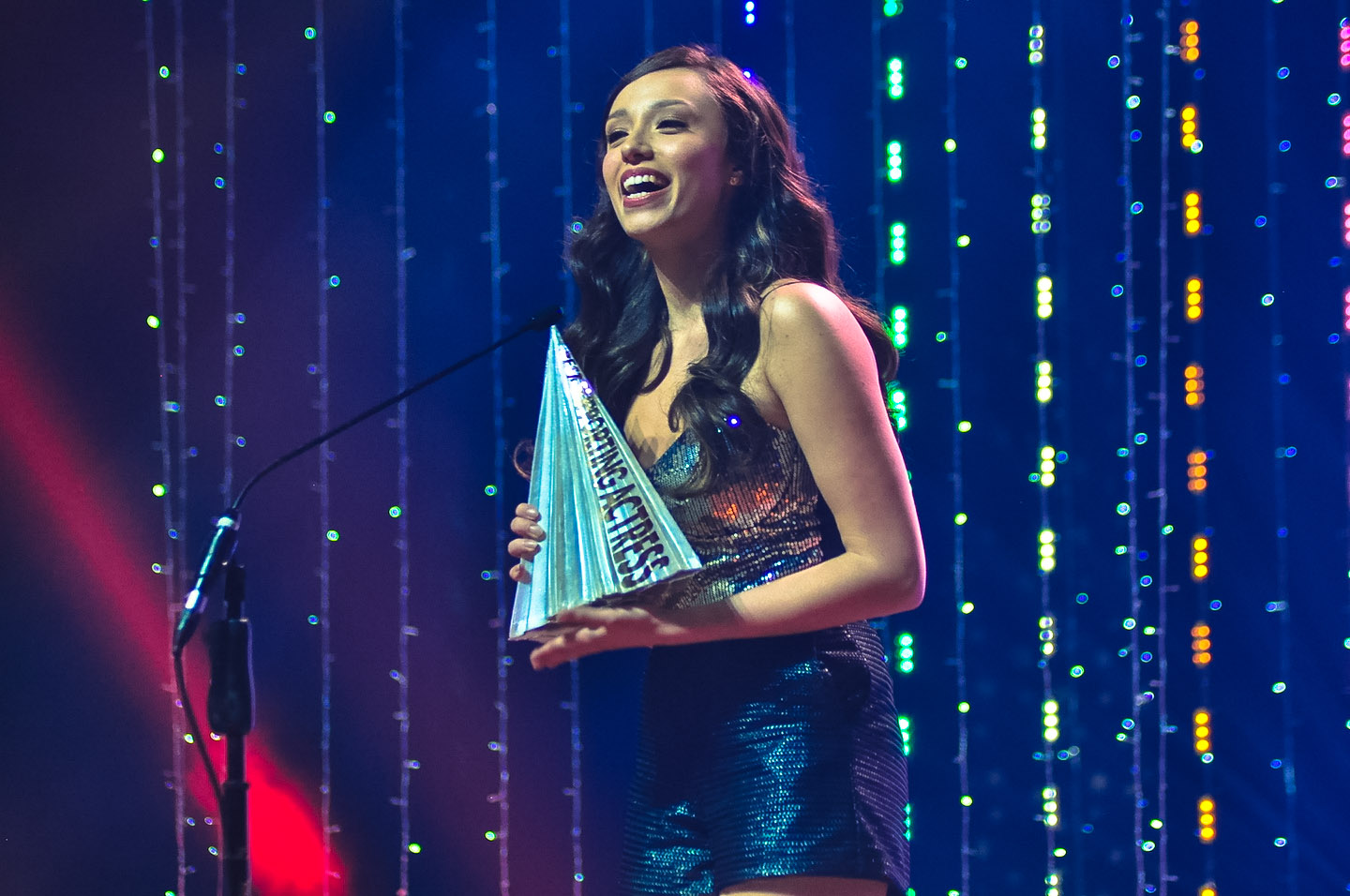
Phoebe Walker, winner of The Amazing Race Philippines 2

== See also ==
List of The Amazing Race Philippines winners
