= Catarman =

Catarman is the name of two municipalities in the Philippines:

- Catarman, Camiguin
- Catarman, Northern Samar
