= Confessions of a Torpe =

2014 Philippine television comedy drama series

- Genre: Comedy-drama
- Written by: Benedict Mique; Nathaniel Arciaga; Volta delos Santos
- Directed by: Topel Lee; Soxy Topacio
- Starring: Ogie Alcasid; Alice Dixson; Gelli de Belen
- Theme music composer: "Natotorpe Ako" by TakeOff
- Country of origin: Philippines
- Original language: Tagalog
- No. of episodes: 78

Production
- Running time: 30 minutes

Original release
- Network: TV5
- Release: March 3 – June 20, 2014

Confessions of a Torpe is a 2014 Philippine television drama comedy series broadcast by TV5. Directed by Topel Lee and Soxy Topacio, it stars Ogie Alcasid, Gelli de Belen and Alice Dixson. It aired the network's evening line up from March 3 to June 20, 2014, replacing Madam Chairman and was replaced by Juan Direction.

== Cast ==
Main cast

- Ogie Alcasid as Christopher "Tupe" Matacutin
- Alice Dixson as Monique Salcedo
- Gelli de Belen as Luzviminda "Luz" Mabuti

Supporting cast

- Bayani Agbayani as Adonis Pante
- Jojo Alejar as Santo Lorenzo Ruiz
- Wendell Ramos as Peter "Mr. Big" Malaqui
- Carmina Manzano as Osang Salcedo
- Pilita Corrales as Ligaya Salcedo
- Bibeth Orteza as Pasencia "Aling Pacing" Catacutan
- Mark Neumann as Hanley Kubrick
- Shaira Diaz as Lovely Mabuti
- Albie Casiño as Jack Malaqui
- Mike Lloren as Lito Mabuti
- Gerard Acao as Reggie

Guest cast

- Dominic Ochoa as Torpe De Guzman
- IC Mendoza as Verca
- Dennis Padilla as John
- Alyssa Alano as Shirley
- Rufa Mi as Roxanne
- Marvelous Alejo as Yumi
- Patani Daño as Jhunalyn
- Kuhol as Nick
- Tiya Pusit as Aling Rosing
- Flora Gasser as Vendor
- Mark Anthony Robrigado as Mark
- Boobie as Patty
- Francine "Kim Chiu" Garcia as Denice Kuneho
- Jasper Visaya as Cedie
- Lou Veloso as Barangay Chairman
- Caloy Alde as Tanod
- JC Parker as Bernadette Supsup
- KC Montero as Radio DJ
- Mon Confiado as Ramon
- Pau Chavez as Aicha
- Jana Victoria as Beauty
- Lilia Cuntapay as Beauty's Nanny
- Wendy Valdez as Virginia
- Phoemela Baranda as Christine Zulueta
- DJ Durano as Direk Thor
- Negi as Brittney
- Shalala as Bugsy
- Nanding Josef as Lolo Grumpy
- Ethel Booba as Sue
- Boom Vergara as Harry
- Valeen Montenegro as Lizzy
- Mel Martinez as Nelson Torero
- Leo Martinez as Bill Salcedo
- Raquel Villavicencio as Hilary Salcedo
- Jasmine Curtis-Smith as Jasmine
- Derek Ramsay as Hunk
