= Gretchen Abaniel =

Filipino boxer (born 1985)

Personal information
- Nickname: "Chen-Chen"
- Nationality: Filipino
- Born: Gretchen Magbanua Abaniel; November 4, 1985 (age 40) Puerto Princesa, Palawan, Philippines
- Height: 5 ft 1 in (1.55 m)
- Weight: Atomweight; Mini-flyweight; Light-flyweight

Boxing career
- Stance: Orthodox

Boxing record
- Total fights: 29
- Wins: 18
- Win by KO: 6
- Losses: 11
Medal record
Women's amateur boxing
Representing Philippines
World Championships
Bronze medal – third place	2005 Podolsk	Pinweight

Gretchen Magbanua Abaniel (born November 4, 1985) is a former Filipino professional boxer. She held the WIBA mini-flyweight title from 2009 to 2011 and the WIBF mini-flyweight title from 2015 to 2016. She has also challenged for multiple major world titles across three weight classes; the WBA, IBF and WBO female mini-flyweight titles between 2008 and 2017; the WBA female atomweight title in 2013; and the WBO female light-flyweight title in 2018.

== Early life ==
Abaniel's father thought she should learn martial arts like karate and she later grew interested in boxing, joining the national team to start her amateur career. Abaniel is a Seventh-day Adventist.

== Boxing career ==
=== Amateur ===
Abaniel, a resident of Puerto Princesa, has been supported by her town's mayor, Edward Hagedorn, throughout her career, even when becoming part of the Philippine national team in 2003 due to inadequate support from the Philippine Sports Commission. As an amateur boxer competing for her country, Abaniel won a bronze medal at the 2005 Women's World Amateur Boxing Championships in Russia. She has also won titles in tournaments held in Taiwan.

=== Professional ===
Citing lack of support from the government, Abaniel turned professional in 2006.

Abaniel won her first world title match against Thailand's Nongbua Lookpraiaree after a tenth-round unanimous decision allowed her to capture the vacant Women's International Boxing Association World minimumweight title. She lost her title to Samson Tor Buamas in Sukhothai, Thailand on February 19, 2011.

2015 Abaniel won her match in Ludwigsburg MHP Arena, Ludwigsburg, Baden-Württemberg, Germany, against undefeated hometown favorite, German-Turkish Oezlem Sahin for the WIBF/GBU world light flyweight title. Judges scored (96-94,94-96,99-91) granting her a split decision victory.

== Professional boxing record ==
29 fights	18 wins	11 losses
By knockout	6	3
By decision	12	8

No.	Result	Record	Opponent	Type	Round, time	Date	Location	Notes
29	Loss	18–11	Seniesa Estrada	RTD	4 (10), 2:00	Jun 13, 2019	The Avalon, Los Angeles, California, U.S.	For WBC Silver female light-flyweight title
28	Loss	18–10	Tenkai Tsunami	TKO	4 (10), 1:33	Jul 29, 2018	Okinawa Convention Center, Ginowan, Japan	For WBO female light-flyweight title
27	Loss	18–9	Cai Zongju	UD	10	Oct 28, 2017	Macau East Asian Games Dome, Cotai, China	For IBF female mini-flyweight title
26	Win	18–8	Chamaporn Chairin	UD	6	Sep 30, 2017	Elorde Sports Complex, Parañaque, Philippines	
25	Win	17–8	Saowaluk Nareepangsri	UD	10	Jul 2, 2016	Club Punchbowl, Sydney, Australia	Retained GBU female mini-flyweight title; Won vacant WIBA mini-flyweight title
24	Win	16–8	Asiye Özlem Sahin	SD	10	Nov 7, 2015	Arena Ludwigsburg, Ludwigsburg, Germany	Won GBU and vacant WIBF mini-flyweight titles
23	Loss	15–8	Park Ji-hyun	UD	10	Aug 1, 2015	Bucheon Gymnasium, Bucheon, South Korea	For WIBA atomweight title
22	Loss	15–7	Cai Zongju	UD	10	Feb 22, 2015	Wenshan Prefecture Ethnic Gymnasium, Wenshan, China	For vacant WBC International female mini-flyweight title
21	Loss	15–6	Kumiko Seeser Ikehara	SD	10	Sep 20, 2014	Azalea Taisho Hall, Osaka, Japan	For vacant WBO female mini-flyweight title
20	Win	15–5	Thanya Tuyon	TKO	5 (10), 1:44	May 24, 2014	Sofitel Sydney Wentworth, Sydney, Australia	
19	Win	14–5	Sumalee Tongpootorn	TKO	9 (10), 1:18	Feb 7, 2014	Town Plaza Gymnasium, Biñan, Philippines	Won vacant WIBA mini-flyweight title
18	Loss	13–5	Ayaka Miyao	UD	10	Nov 28, 2013	Korakuen Hall, Tokyo, Japan	For WBA female atomweight title
17	Win	13–4	Dorkmaipa Keangpompetch	KO	1 (4), 1:39	Aug 17, 2013	RSL Club, Sawtell, Australia	
16	Win	12–4	Chadaphorn Suklert	TKO	4 (10), 1:36	Dec 2, 2012	Makati Cinema Square Boxing Arena, Makati, Philippines	Won vacant WIBA mini-flyweight title
15	Win	11–4	Christine Latube	UD	6	Sep 29, 2012	Brusmick Compound Gym, Santa Rosa, Philippines	
14	Loss	10–4	Teeraporn Pannimit	UD	10	Apr 25, 2012	Bung Nam Thao, Thailand	For vacant WBO female mini-flyweight title
13	Loss	10–3	Katia Gutiérrez	TKO	4 (10), 1:57	Dec 10, 2011	Estadio Centenario, Los Mochis, Mexico	For IBF female mini-flyweight title
12	Loss	10–2	Siriporn Thaweesuk	UD	10	Feb 19, 2011	Sukhothai Institute of Physical Education Stadium, Sukhothai, Thailand	For WIBA and vacant WBC–ABCO mini-flyweight titles
11	Win	10–1	Buasawan Wisetchat	UD	8	Oct 2, 2010	Elorde Sports Complex, Parañaque, Philippines	
10	Win	9–1	Waranya Yoohanngoh	UD	10	Mar 25, 2010	Sofitel Philippine Plaza Manila, Pasay, Philippines	Retained WIBA mini-flyweight title
9	Win	8–1	Buasawan Wisetchat	UD	10	Mar 25, 2009	Manila Hotel, Manila, Philippines	Won vacant WIBA mini-flyweight title
8	Win	7–1	Tukta Pakabbuth	UD	10	Sep 13, 2008	Puerto Princesa Coliseum, Puerto Princesa, Philippines	Retained WIBA Intercontinental mini-flyweight title
7	Loss	6–1	Son Cho-rong	TD	4 (10), 2:00	Mar 16, 2008	Gwangju, South Korea	For WBA female mini-flyweight title
6	Win	6–0	Napaporn Boonchuon	UD	10	Nov 16, 2007	San Andres Civic & Sports Center, Manila, Philippines	Won vacant WBC International female mini-flyweight title
5	Win	5–0	Li Hai Li	UD	8	Sep 15, 2007	Elorde Sports Complex, Parañaque, Philippines	Won vacant WIBA Intercontinental mini-flyweight title
4	Win	4–0	Baina Londo	TKO	3 (4), 1:00	Apr 29, 2007	Plaza Rajah Sulayman, Manila, Philippines	
3	Win	3–0	Jessica Oyang	TKO	3 (4), 1:20	Apr 21, 2007	New Victorias City Coliseum, Victorias, Philippines	
2	Win	2–0	Baina Londo	UD	4	Mar 3, 2007	Plaza Rajah Sulayman, Manila, Philippines	
1	Win	1–0	Li Hai Li	MD	4	Dec 21, 2006	EXPO Garden Hotel, Kunming, China	

== Titles and Accomplishment ==
WIBA Women's International Boxing Association Minimumweight title (2009, 2014, 2016)
WBC International female minimumweight title (2007)

Other Titles:
WIBA Minimumweight Intercontinental Title
Women's International Boxing Federation World Minimumweight title
Global Boxing Union Female World Minimumweight title

== Appearances in media ==
She was a contestant on the television program The Amazing Race Philippines 2, being a part of an athleticism focused duo with Luz McClitton. She was also a guest on a morning news-talk program called GMK conceptualized by Daniel Razon.

She also participated on a Philippine variety show called It's Showtime:Trabahula on March 10, 2016

== See also ==
- List of The Amazing Race Philippines contestants
