= Happy Wife, Happy Life =

- Genre: Lifestyle talk show
- Created by: TV5 Network
- Presented by: Danica Sotto; LJ Moreno; Mariel Rodriguez
- Country of origin: Philippines
- Original languages: Filipino; English
- No. of seasons: 3
- No. of episodes: 183 (Final)

Production
- Running time: 45 minutes

Original release
- Network: TV5
- Release: January 19 – October 2, 2015

Happy Wife, Happy Life is a Philippine television talk show broadcast by TV5. Hosted by Danica Pingris, LJ Alapag, Jeck Maierhofer and RR Enriquez, it aired from January 19 to October 2, 2015.

== Final hosts ==
- Danica Sotto
- Gelli de Belen
- LJ Moreno

=== Former hosts ===
- RR Enriquez
- Jeck Maierhofer
- Mariel Rodriguez

=== Guest hosts ===
- Janice de Belen
- Candy Pangilinan

== See also ==
- List of TV5 (Philippine TV network) original programming
