= Heritage of Cebu Monument =

Sculptural tableau in Cebu City, Philippines

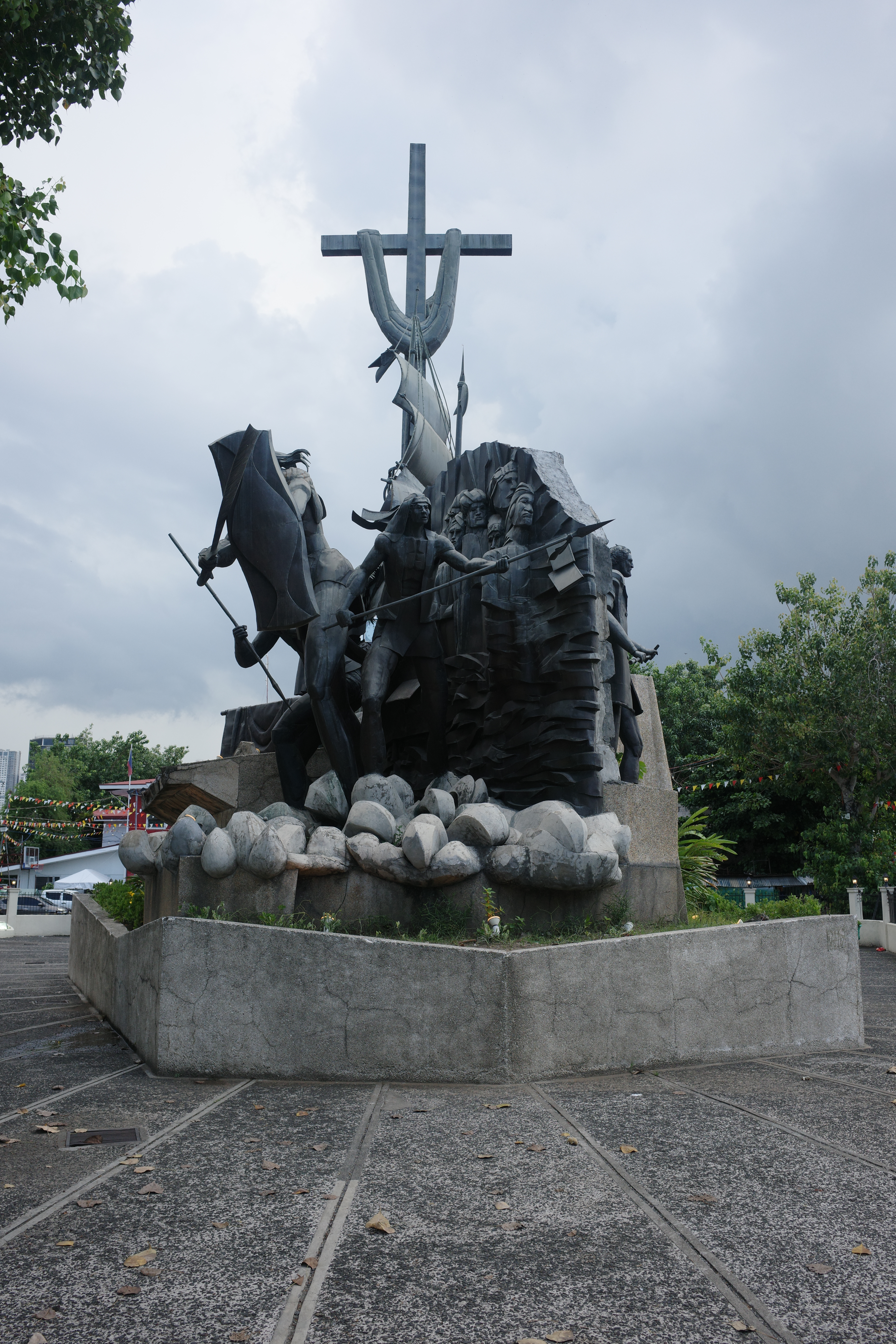
- The monument in Parian, Cebu City
- Interactive map of Heritage of Cebu Monument
- Location: Parian, Cebu City, Philippines
- Coordinates: 10°17′56″N 123°54′13.1″E
- Designer: Eduardo Castrillo (sculptor); Heradio Español and Ildefonso P. Santos Jr. (architects)
- Type: Sculptural tableau
- Material: Concrete; bronze; brass; steel
- Beginning date: July 1997
- Completion date: December 2000
- Opening date: December 8, 2000
- Restored date: 2010
- Dedicated to: The history of Cebu

The Heritage of Cebu Monument, also known as the Parian Monument or the Cebu Heritage Monument, is a sculptural tableau in the Parian district of Cebu City, Philippines. Built between 1997 and 2000, it depicts events, buildings and personalities associated with the history of Cebu, from the Battle of Mactan in 1521 to the beatification of the Cebuano martyr Pedro Calungsod in 2000.

The monument was designed by the Filipino sculptor Eduardo Castrillo, working with the architects Heradio Español and Ildefonso P. Santos Jr. It is executed in a mixture of concrete, bronze, brass and steel. Conceived in 1996 as a joint idea of Castrillo and then-mayor Alvin Garcia, it was built under the auspices of the Cultural Heritage Foundation Inc., chaired by Cardinal Ricardo Vidal, and financed largely by a donation from senator Marcelo Fernan together with the sculptor's own funds and private contributions. Construction began in July 1997 and the monument was inaugurated on December 8, 2000.

The monument stands on the former Plaza Parian, the site of the demolished San Juan Bautista Church, and is the centerpiece of the surrounding Parian Park. It is a fixture of Cebu City's heritage walking tours, along with the neighboring Yap-San Diego House, 1730 Jesuit House, and the Casa Gorordo Museum.

== Site ==
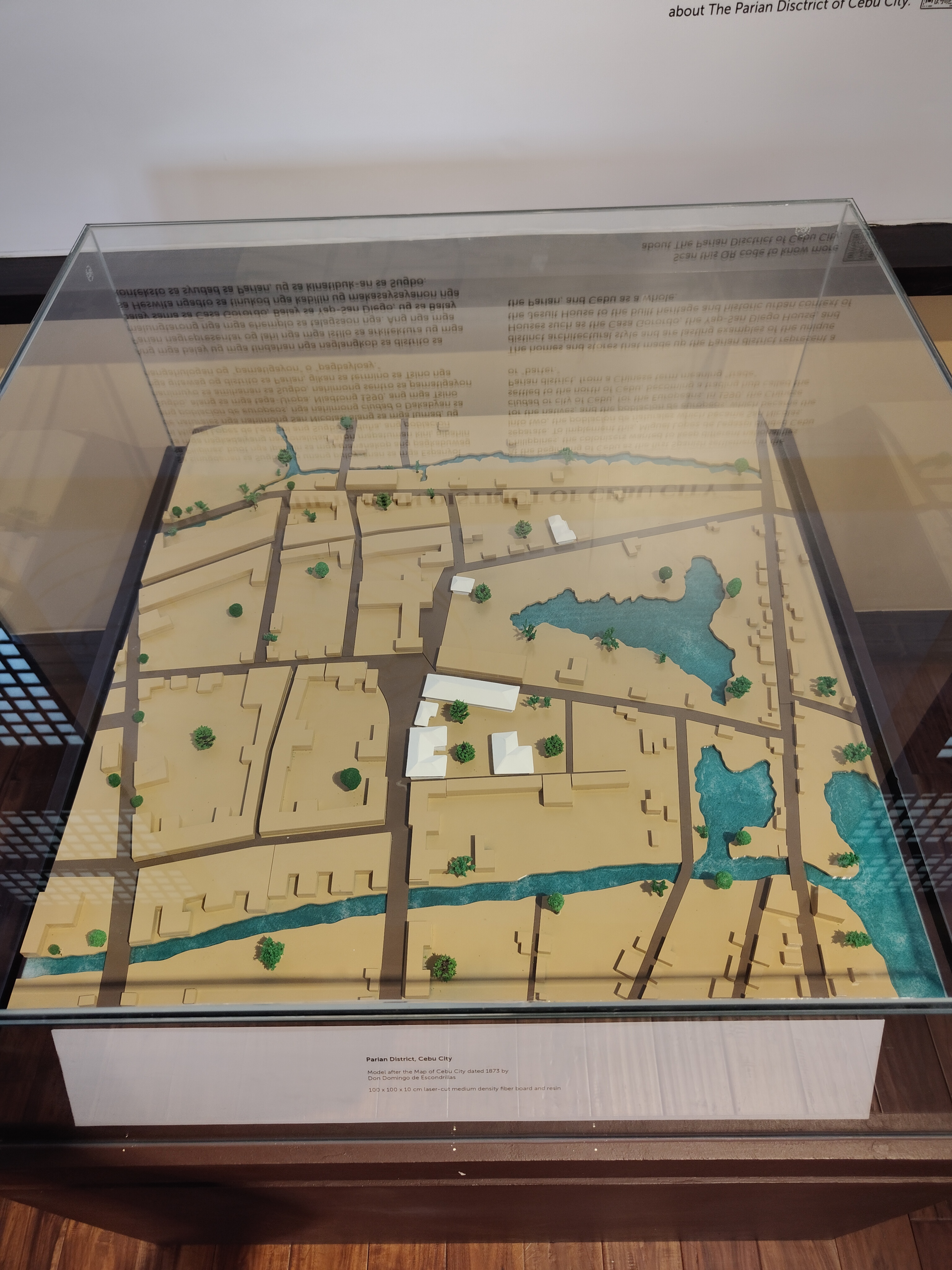
Model of Parián District, Cebu (in white), from ca. 1873, as seen in the National Museum of the Philippines - Cebu

A Chinese settlement was established on the northern side of Spanish Cebu around 1590, and the district of Parian grew into a market and trading center during the brief period when Cebu took part in the galleon trade. On October 22, 1614, the second bishop of Cebu, Pedro de Arce, separated the port area into two parishes, one of which served the Christian Chinese and Filipinos of Parian. As the Chinese population declined, Parian became a district of Chinese mestizos and, by the nineteenth century, the wealthiest quarter of the city.

The Parian parish, dedicated to Saint John the Baptist, was suppressed in 1830, reestablished in 1838, and abolished in 1849, after which it functioned with diminished powers under the jurisdiction of the cathedral. Its church—described in Cebuano sources as the most opulent in the city—was demolished after a Spanish engineer reported that its materials were unsound; accounts of the date range from 1875 to 1879, with most placing the demolition in 1878. The convent survived and was later used as a public library and then a fire station; the Parian Fire Station, built in 1954 and described as the first in the Visayas and Mindanao, still occupies the site.

== Commissioning and construction ==
The monument originated as a joint proposal of Castrillo and Cebu City mayor Alvin Garcia, with the concept, design and organization worked out in 1996. It was undertaken by the Cultural Heritage Foundation Inc., chaired by Cardinal Ricardo Vidal, in cooperation with the city government and the Department of Tourism.

Fabrication of the sculptures began in July 1997. Funding came principally from a donation by the late senator Marcelo Fernan, supplemented by Castrillo's own money and by contributions from private individuals and organizations. The completed monument was inaugurated on December 8, 2000.

== Description ==
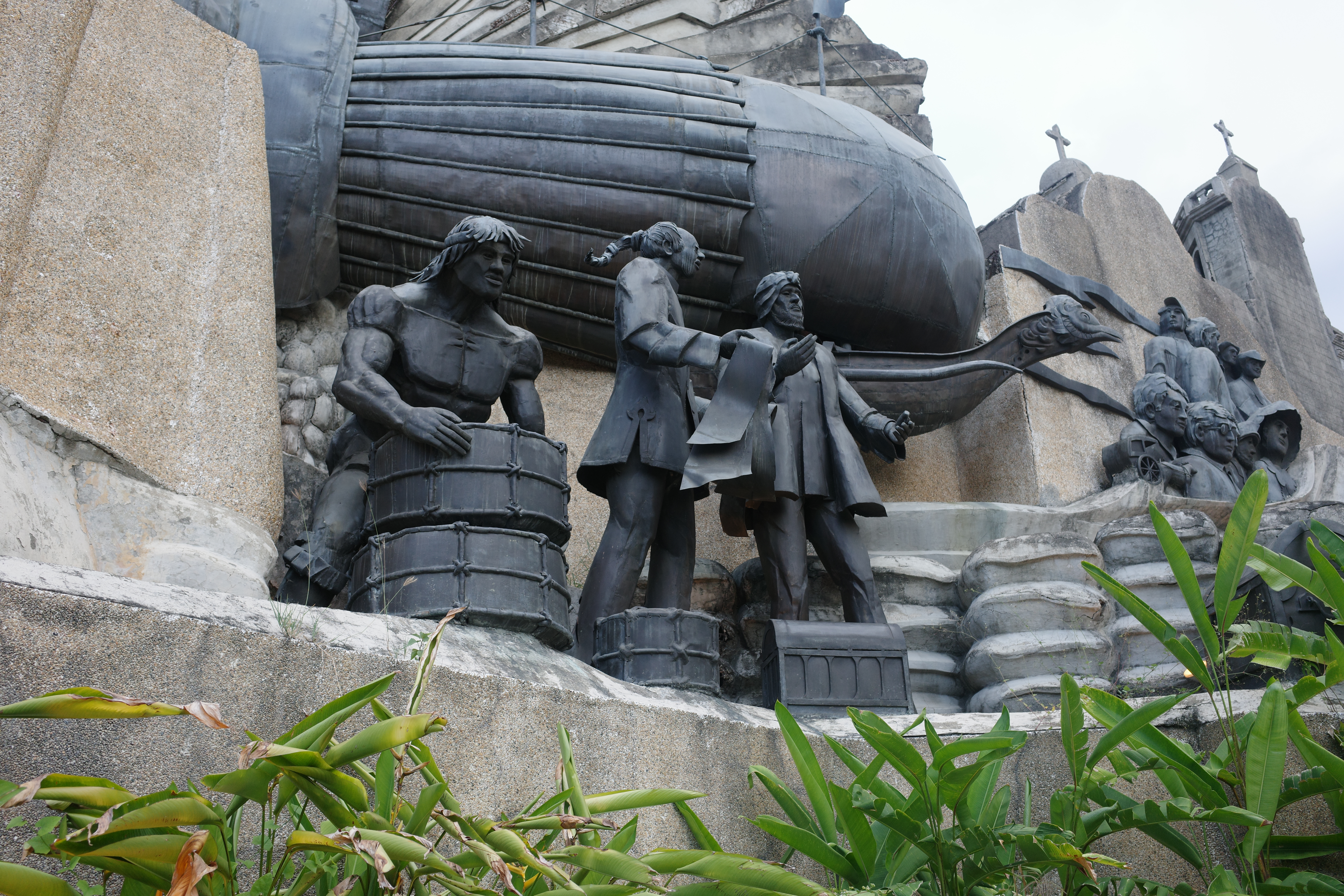
Detail of the tableau

The monument occupies a triangular plot bounded by narrow streets a short distance from the northern end of Colon Street, near Zulueta Street in downtown Parian. Its scenes are arranged around the tableau so that it is meant to be walked around rather than viewed from a single vantage point.

Episodes represented include the Battle of Mactan of April 21, 1521, in which the warriors of Lapulapu killed Ferdinand Magellan; the baptism of Rajah Humabon and his followers; the celebration of a Roman Catholic mass; the Cebuano devotion to the Santo Niño; the local revolt against Spanish rule; the inauguration of Sergio Osmeña as President of the Philippines; and the beatification of Pedro Calungsod. (Note: Calungsod was beatified on March 5, 2000, some nine months before the monument was inaugurated. He was not canonized until October 21, 2012, well after the tableau was completed.)

Buildings and objects reproduced in the tableau include the Basilica del Santo Niño, the Cebu Metropolitan Cathedral, the vanished San Juan Bautista Church of Parian, Magellan's Cross and a Spanish galleon.

== Ownership and upkeep ==
The monument as seen from P. Burgos St.

Ownership passed to the city in December 2008, when the Cultural Heritage Foundation Inc. turned the monument over to the Cebu City government, Cardinal Vidal handing it to acting mayor Mike Rama at a ceremony on the site. A council resolution had authorized mayor Tomas Osmeña to conclude an agreement with the foundation under which the city would operate and maintain the monument and fund it annually.

In 2010 the Department of Tourism spent ₱2 million restoring Parian Park, adding landscaping, lighting and a grill fence around the monument and repairing the flooring and moldings. Tourism secretary Ace Durano and mayor-elect Rama led the unveiling.

The monument has since been treated as an anchor of the city's heritage tourism. It is a stop on the Pasiyo sa Kabilin heritage walk, which began in 2019, lapsed during the COVID-19 pandemic and resumed in September 2022, and it falls within the downtown heritage district created by City Ordinance No. 2690 in May 2023. It also figures in successive plans for the surrounding streets, from the restoration of the Spanish-era Sikatuna bridge to a proposal to pedestrianize the Estero de Parian corridor. Its immediate setting remains contested: in April 2026 the council, on the recommendation of the Cultural and Historical Affairs Commission, ordered Bureau of Fire Protection vehicles and staff not assigned to the Parian sub-station out of the adjoining Parian Plaza, which had been serving as a motor pool, so that the plaza could be restored.
