= Sunken Cemetery =

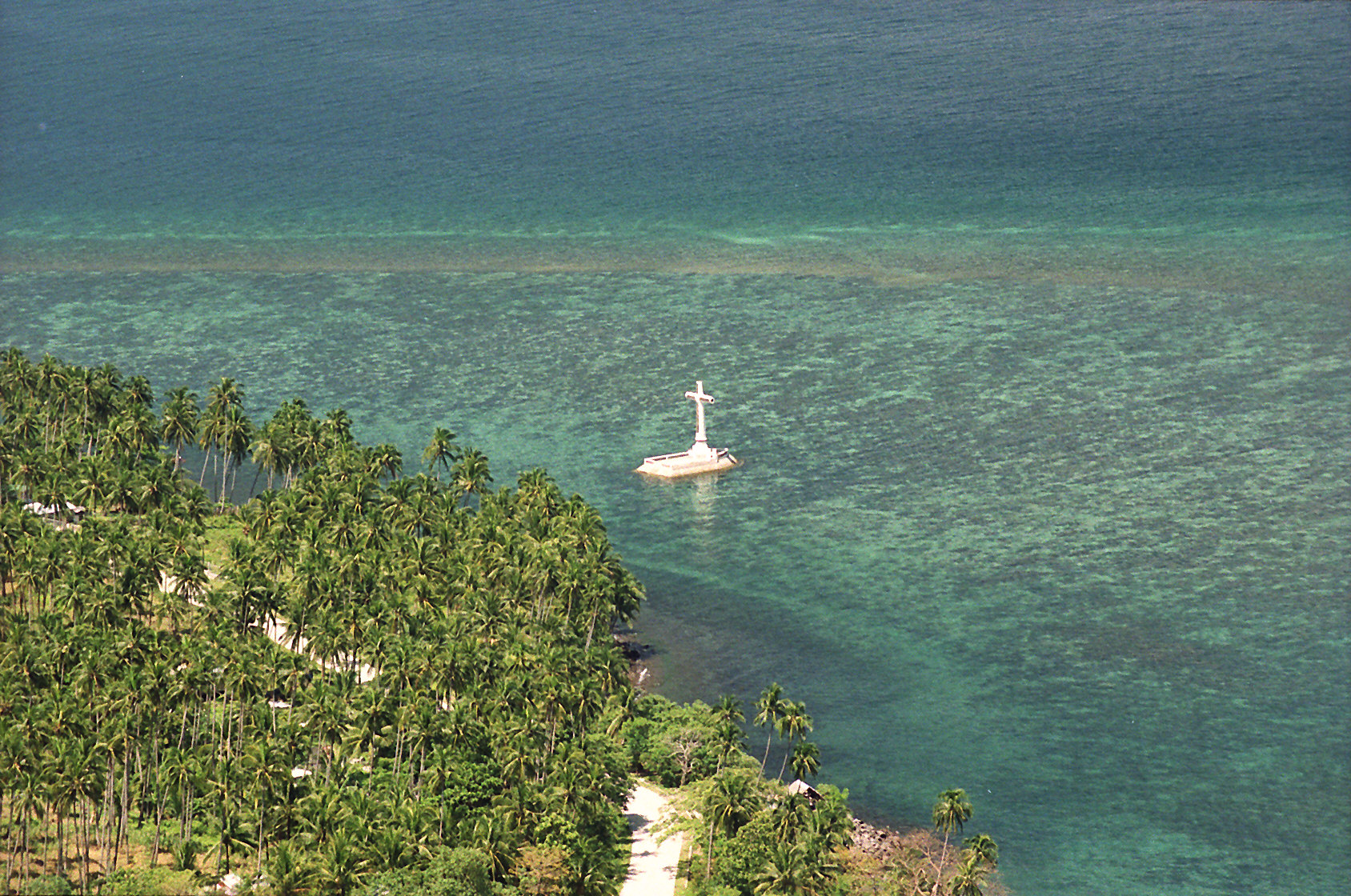
- Aerial view of the Sunken Cemetery of Camiguin
- Interactive map of Sunken Cemetery
- Location: Catarman, Camiguin, Philippines
- Coordinates: 9°12′24.3″N 124°37′58.7″E
- Type: Submerged cemetery
- Material: Concrete (cross)
- Completion date: 1982 (current cross marker)
- Dedicated to: People interred in the former Bonbon Cemetery submerged by the 1871 eruption of Mount Vulcan

The Sunken Cemetery is a submerged cemetery in Catarman, Camiguin, Philippines.

== History ==
The Sunken Cemetery used to be a cemetery above ground during the Spanish colonial era used as a burial site of the people of the old settlement of Bonbon, now part of Catarman, Camiguin. The site was submerged in water after the eruption of Mount Vulcan on May 1, 1871.

The first marker on the site was a hardwood cross visible above the water. This deteriorated over time, and a concrete replacement was built in 1982 by the provincial government of Camiguin.

In 2018, the Sunken Cemetery was declared a National Cultural Treasure by the National Museum of the Philippines.

== Features ==
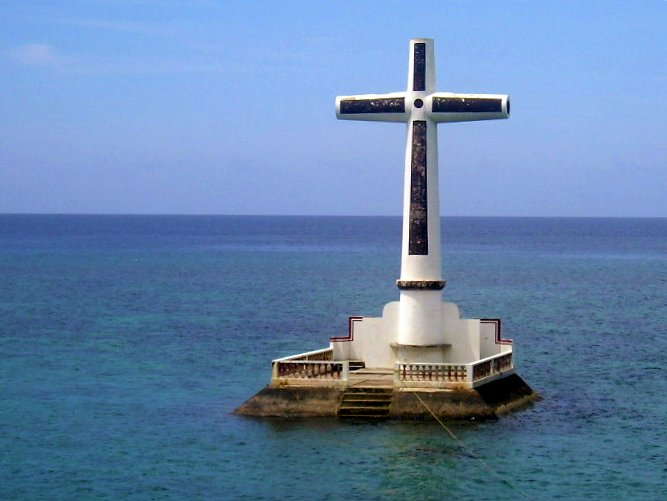
Concrete cross marker of the Sunken Cemetery.

The Sunken Cemetery situated in Barrio Bonbon is noted for the white concrete cross, with the tombs submerged under water as deep as 6.1 meters (20 ft). The tombstones are covered by coral and often visited by snorkelers and scuba divers. Some submerged features are visible at low tide.
