= RR Enriquez =

Filipino model and dancer

- Born: Romyreen Enriquez; October 19, 1983 (age 42); Metro Manila, Philippines
- Other name: RR Enriquez
- Occupations: Dancer businesswoman former host former model, singer, songwriter
- Years active: 2007–2015, 2021, 2023–present

RR Enriquez (born Romyreen Enriquez on October 19, 1983) is a Filipino model, dancer and television personality. She first became known as one of the dancers on the variety and game show Wowowee. She later became one of its hosts alongside Mariel Rodriguez, Valerie Concepcion and Pokwang. She currently stars on the Filipino comedy show Banana Split on ABS-CBN, together with Angelica Panganiban, Pokwang and others.

== Modelling ==
She is featured on the covers of the June 2009 Filipino editions of FHM.

== Filmography ==
=== Film ===
- Dyagwar: Havey o Waley (2011)
- Raketeros (2013)
- Status: It's Complicated (2013) as Yvonne

=== Television ===
| Year | Title | Role |
|---|---|---|
| 2007 | Search for the Next White Castle Girl | Herself / Contestant |
| 2007–2010 | Wowowee | Herself (Host) |
| 2008–2011 | Banana Split | Herself |
| 2008 | Eva Fonda | Virgie |
| 2009 | Your Song: Boystown | Nurse Pamela |
| 2010 | Your Song: Love Me, Love You | College Girl (Cameo Role) |
| 2010–2014 | Pabida Ka! | Herself (Host) |
| 2011 | Precious Hearts Romances Presents: Mana Po | Weng |
| 2011 | Good Vibes | Gracia |
| 2011 | Reputasyon | Monica |
| 2011 | I Dare You | Herself |
| 2014 | The Amazing Race Philippines | Herself |
| 2015 | Happy Wife, Happy Life | Herself (Host) |
