= Juan Direction =

2013–14 Philippine television reality show

- Title card
- Genre: Reality
- Created by: Island Media Asia
- Starring: Brian Wilson; Daniel Marsh; Henry Edwards; Michael McDonnell; Charlie Sutcliffe
- Country of origin: Philippines
- Original language: Tagalog

Production
- Executive producer: Leo James Conde
- Running time: 30 minutes

Original release
- Network: TV5; AksyonTV
- Release: October 19, 2013 – October 3, 2014

Juan Direction is a Philippine television reality show broadcast by TV5 and AksyonTV. It aired on TV5 every Saturday, later moved to Sunday from October 19, 2013 to 2014 and on AksyonTV every Monday from February 24 to April 7, 2014. The show's second season aired from June 23, 2014 to July 4, 2014, replacing Confessions of a Torpe and was replaced by Cool Guys, Hot Ramen. The third and final season aired from September 22, 2014 to October 3, 2014.

== History ==
The original members of Juan Direction first formed the group in 2012 under the name "Island Media Asia" (IMA). They originally posted tutorial and documentary-style travel videos on Twitch. Their style was described as "vlogumentary", a mix of vlogging and documentary.

Although they continued to make videos online after beginning the reality show, their main popularity was a result of the group's previous work on YouTube. While IMA had seven members, Juan Direction featured only five of the original members. The other two (Matthew Edwards and Keys Cosido) had a recurring role in the show.

== Production ==
Juan Direction was one of the shows launched in TV5's "Everyday All the Way" trade launch in Taguig in October 2013, and in TV5 Happy Ka Dito in June 2014.

From June 23, 2014 – July 4, 2014, Juan Direction was shifted to weekday primetime as they aired a special two-week season entitled "Juan Experiment ng Juan Direction". In this show, the group participated in various tasks that would challenge their abilities to establish friendships and build relationships, with the end-goal of trying to prove that the differences between cultures no longer matter.

On September 22, 2014, Juan Direction returned on weekday primetime with a new season titled Juan Islanders.

== Cast ==
=== Main cast ===
- Brian Wilson
- Daniel Marsh
- Henry Edwards
- Michael McDonnell
- Charlie Sutcliffe

=== Recurring cast ===
- Matthew "Matt" Edwards
- Keys Cosido

== Episodes ==
=== Season 1 ===
No.	Title	Original release date
1	"Home Along the Riles"	October 19, 2013
Brian, Daniel and Michael are left alone while Charlie cooks sinigang.
2	"Which Way to Quiapo"	October 26, 2013
Brian, Michael, Daniel & Charlie explore Quiapo
3	"Halloween in the Cemetery"	November 2, 2013
Brian, Henry and Michael go trick-or-treating, learn the ways of a sepulturero, and perform a seance.
4	"MassKara Festival Sayawing"	November 9, 2013
5	"Back to School"	November 16, 2013
Charlie, Henry, and Michael attend a local school to learn Tagalog in grade one.
6	"Humble Beginnings in Cebu"	November 23, 2013
The boys travel to Cebu and explore
7	"The Beauty of Bohol"	November 30, 2013
The boys experience the one of a kind beauty that is Bohol
8	"A Natural Born Fighter"	December 7, 2013
9	"Of Aeta Origin"	December 14, 2013
Brothers Henry and Matt with Daniel, travel to Pampanga and go to Aeta tribe. Learnt hunting, tribal dance, bow and arrow making.
10	"A Christmas to Remember"	December 21, 2013
11	"A New Beginning"	January 8, 2014
Michael, Henry & Brian spend the day with a family, currently living in the 'tent city', who were affected by the typhoon.
12	"Work in the Palengke"	January 15, 2014
Daniel, Michael & Charlie experience what it is like to work in a busy palengke (Tagalog for wet market) in the Philippines
13	"The Spirit of Bayanihan"	TBA

=== Season 2 ===
No.	Title	Original release date
14	"Hand in Marriage"	TBA
15	"Finding the Right Date"	TBA
16	"One Hundred Islands"	TBA
Charlie, Brian, and Henry enjoy the beauty of the Hundred Islands while Daniel and Michael have a hard time finding their way.
17	"Panagbenga in Baguio"	TBA
18	"Traditional Filipino Dances"	TBA
19	"Filipino Firefighters"	TBA
20	"Basketball Liga"	TBA
21	"Gold in Benguet"	TBA
22	"Working With Basura"	TBA
23	"Mount Pulag"	TBA
24	"Risky Jobs"	TBA
25	"Pagibang Damara Festival"	TBA
26	"Rodeo in Masbate"	TBA
