= Catarman, Camiguin =

Municipality in Camiguin, Philippines

Catarman
- Municipality
- Municipality of Catarman
- Coastline and Sunken Cemetery Monument Bonbon Church Ruins Tuasan Falls

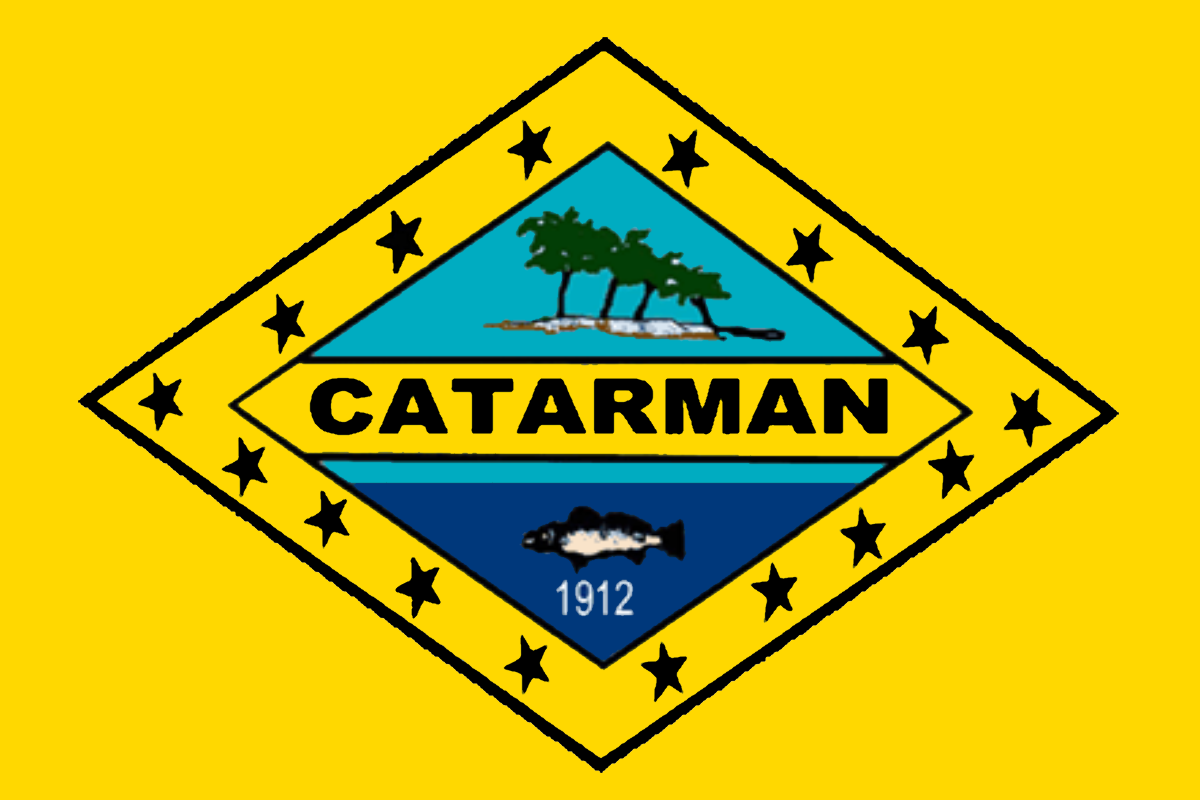
- Flag

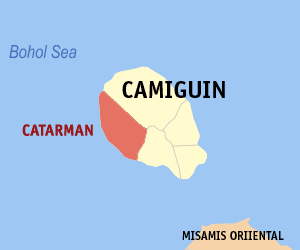
- Map of Camiguin with Catarman highlighted
- Interactive map of Catarman
- Location within the Philippines
- Coordinates: 9°08′N 124°41′E
- Country: Philippines
- Region: Northern Mindanao
- Province: Camiguin
- District: Lone district
- Barangays: 14 (see Barangays)

Government
  - Type: Sangguniang Bayan
  - Mayor: Kiterio Antonio U. Palarca II (PDPLBN)
  - Vice Mayor: Rony N. Sagocsoc (PDPLBN)
  - Representative: Jurdin Jesus M. Romualdo
  - Municipal Council: Members: Carlito N. Sagocsoc; Wilfredo R. Abregana; Lino D. Abregana; Kevin N. Sevilla; Jorge Y. Salas; Cathyrine Lopez-Galos; Jorgeta T. de la Riarte; Remedios B. Absuelo
  - Electorate: 13,066 voters (2025)

Area
  - Total: 53.75 km^{2} (20.75 sq mi)
- Elevation: 51 m (167 ft)
- Highest elevation: 1,618 m (5,308 ft)
- Lowest elevation: 0 m (0 ft)

Population (2024 census)
  - Total: 18,186
  - Density: 338.3/km^{2} (876.3/sq mi)
  - Households: 4,493

Economy
  - Income class: 4th municipal income class
  - Poverty incidence: 19.07% (2023)
  - Revenue: ₱ 115.5 million (2024)
  - Assets: ₱ 357.8 million (2024)
  - Expenditure: ₱ 104.6 million (2024)
  - Liabilities: ₱ 21.55 million (2024)

Service provider
  - Electricity: Camiguin Electric Cooperative (CAMELCO)
- Time zone: UTC+8 (PST)
- ZIP code: 9104
- PSGC: 1001801000
- IDD : area code: +63 (0)88
- Native languages: Kinamigin; Cebuano; Tagalog

Catarman, officially the Municipality of Catarman, is a municipality in the province of Camiguin, Philippines. According to the 2024 census, it has a population of 18,186 people.

== Etymology ==
The town got its name from the Cebuano word katadman which means point or cape.

== Geography ==
=== Barangays ===
Catarman is politically subdivided into 14 barangays. Each barangay consists of puroks while some have sitios.

- Alga
- Bonbon
- Baby Matoy
- Bura
- Catibac
- Compol
- Lawigan
- Liloan
- Looc
- Mainit
- Manduao
- Panghiawan
- Poblacion
- Santo Niño
- Tangaro

=== Climate ===
Climate data for Catarman, Camiguin
Month	Jan	Feb	Mar	Apr	May	Jun	Jul	Aug	Sep	Oct	Nov	Dec	Year
Mean daily maximum °C (°F)	28 (82)	29 (84)	30 (86)	31 (88)	30 (86)	30 (86)	30 (86)	30 (86)	30 (86)	30 (86)	29 (84)	29 (84)	30 (85)
Mean daily minimum °C (°F)	24 (75)	24 (75)	24 (75)	25 (77)	26 (79)	26 (79)	25 (77)	25 (77)	25 (77)	25 (77)	25 (77)	25 (77)	25 (77)
Average precipitation mm (inches)	271 (10.7)	217 (8.5)	193 (7.6)	178 (7.0)	344 (13.5)	423 (16.7)	362 (14.3)	358 (14.1)	329 (13.0)	320 (12.6)	322 (12.7)	260 (10.2)	3,577 (140.9)
Average rainy days	23.2	19.5	22.0	22.8	29.6	28.9	30.3	29.8	28.1	28.8	26.1	24.1	313.2
Source: Meteoblue (modeled/calculated data, not measured locally)

== Demographics ==
Population census of Catarman
Year	Pop.	±% p.a.
1903	4,260	—
1918	7,980	+4.27%
1939	9,484	+0.83%
1948	16,845	+6.59%
1960	10,659	−3.74%
1970	11,996	+1.19%
1975	12,168	+0.29%
1980	12,422	+0.41%
1990	13,892	+1.12%
1995	14,756	+1.14%
2000	15,386	+0.90%
2007	16,060	+0.59%
2010	16,388	+0.74%
2015	16,798	+0.47%
2020	17,569	+0.95%
2024	18,186	+0.83%
Source: Philippine Statistics Authority

In the 2024 census, the population of Catarman was 18,186 people, with a density of 340 inhabitants per square kilometre or 880 inhabitants per square mile.

== Economy ==
Poverty incidence of Catarman (%)

Source: Philippine Statistics Authority

Sunken Cemetery monument

== Tourism ==
Some of the famous tourist spots include the cold spring located in Catarman.

The town is home to the Guiob (Brgy. Bonbon) Church ruins and the Sunken Cemetery, both of which are declared a National Cultural Treasure.
