= 2007 Philippine general election =

- May 14, 2007
- Registered: 45,029,443
- Turnout: 29,498,660
- 2007 Philippine Senate election
- May 14, 2007

12 (of the 24) seats in the Senate of the Philippines 13 seats needed for a majority
Alliance	GO	TEAM Unity	Liberal
Seats won	8	2	1
Popular vote	136,888,165	98,927,031	14,534,678
Percentage	50.87%	36.76%	5.40%
Senate President before election
Manny Villar
Nacionalista
Elected Senate President
Manny Villar
Nacionalista
- 2007 Philippine House of Representatives elections
- May 14, 2007
- All 270 seats in the House of Representatives; 136 seats needed for a majority
Party	Seats	+/–
Lakas	89	−3
KAMPI	44	+42
NPC	28	−25
Liberal	23	−6
Nacionalista	11	+9
Others	23	−6
Party-list	53	+1
This lists parties that won seats. See the complete results below.
Speaker before	Speaker after
Jose de Venecia Jr. Lakas	Jose de Venecia Jr. Lakas

Legislative and local elections were held in the Philippines on May 14, 2007. Positions contested included half the seats in the Senate, which are elected for six-year terms, and all the seats in the House of Representatives, who were elected for three-year terms. The duly elected legislators of the 2007 elections joined the elected senators of the 2004 elections to comprise the 14th Congress of the Philippines.

Most representatives won seats by being elected directly, the constituency being a geographical district of about 250,000 voters. There were 220 seats in total for all the legislative districts.

Some representatives were elected under a party-list system. Only parties representing marginalized groups were allowed to run in the party-list election. To gain one seat, a party must win 2% of the vote. No party-list party may have more than 3 seats. After the election, in a controversial decision, the Commission on Elections (COMELEC) changed how it allocates the party-list seats. Under the new formula only one party will have the maximum 3 seats. It based its decision on a formula contained in a Supreme Court decision.

Local elections for governor, vice governor, provincial board seats and mayoral, vice mayoral and city/municipal council seats in Metro Manila and the provinces were up for grabs as well.

== Issues in the elections ==
=== Automated elections ===
Sen. Richard J. Gordon and his fellow Senators succeeded in passing Republic Act No. 9369 or the Amending the Election Modernization Act but it was too late since it was passed three months before the elections but since the law was passed, the automated elections were instead implemented in the Philippines the following year on August 11, 2008 with 2008 ARMM election and later adopted to the national level two years later in May 10, 2010 after preparations of the latter were made from 2009 to 2010.

=== Failure of elections ===
The following areas held special elections after the COMELEC designated the following areas as failure of elections:

Area	Special Elections Date
Bayang, Lumbatan, Madalum, Binidayan, Pualas, Sultan Dumalondong, Lumba-Bayabao, Masiu, Kapai, Lumbayanague, Butig, Marogong and Kapatagan in Lanao del Sur	May 26–27, 2007
Tandubas, Tawi-Tawi	June 20, 2007
Indanan, Sulu	June 20, 2007
Barangay Pinagbayanan, Taysan, Batangas	June 20, 2007
Taraka, Tamparan, Marantao, Lumbaca-Unayan, Pagayawan, Tubaran, Ganassi and Marawi City in Lanao del Sur	June 20, 2007
Barira and Kabuntalan, Shariff Kabunsuan	June 20, 2007
Akbar and Sumisip, Basilan	June 20, 2007
Pantar, Lanao del Norte	July 23, 2007
Pantao Ragat, Lanao del Norte	July 26, 2007

== Candidates ==
=== TEAM Unity ===
TEAM Unity ticket
For Senators
Edgardo Angara	LDP
Joker Arroyo	KAMPI
Mike Defensor	Lakas
Jamalul Kiram III	PDSP
Vicente Magsaysay	Lakas
Cesar Montano	Lakas
Tessie Aquino-Oreta	NPC
Prospero Pichay Jr.	Lakas
Ralph Recto	Lakas
Chavit Singson	Lakas
Tito Sotto	NPC
Juan Miguel Zubiri	Lakas

=== Genuine Opposition ===
Genuine Opposition ticket
For Senators
Benigno Aquino III	Liberal
Alan Peter Cayetano	Nacionalista
Nikki Coseteng	Independent
Francis Escudero	NPC
Panfilo Lacson	UNO
Loren Legarda	NPC
John Henry Osmeña	UNO
Koko Pimentel	PDP–Laban
Sonia Roco	Aksyon
Antonio Trillanes	UNO
Manny Villar	Nacionalista

=== Other tickets ===
==== Ang Kapatiran ====
Ang Kapatiran ticket
For Senators
Martin Bautista	Ang Kapatiran
Adrian Sison	Ang Kapatiran
Zosimo Paredes	Ang Kapatiran

==== KBL ====
Kilusang Bagong Lipunan ticket
For Senators
Melchor Chavez	KBL
Joselito Pepito Cayetano	KBL
Ruben Enciso	KBL
Antonio Estrella	KBL
Oliver Lozano	KBL
Eduardo Orpilla	KBL
Victor Wood	KBL

==== Others ====
For Senators
Felix Cantal	PGRP
Richard Gomez	Independent
Gregorio Honasan	Independent
Francis Pangilinan	Liberal

== Election results ==
=== Senate ===
Representation of results; seats contested are inside the box. Liberal Party Lakas-CMD Nacionalista Party LDP NPC UNO PMP KAMPI PRP PDP–Laban Independent Vacancy

Candidate	Party or alliance		Votes	%
Loren Legarda	Genuine Opposition	Nationalist People's Coalition	18,501,734	62.72
Francis Escudero	Genuine Opposition	Nationalist People's Coalition	18,265,307	61.92
Panfilo Lacson	Genuine Opposition	United Opposition	15,509,188	52.58
Manny Villar	Genuine Opposition	Nacionalista Party	15,338,412	52.00
Kiko Pangilinan	Liberal Party		14,534,678	49.27
Benigno Aquino III	Genuine Opposition	Liberal Party	14,309,349	48.51
Edgardo Angara	TEAM Unity	Laban ng Demokratikong Pilipino	12,657,769	42.91
Joker Arroyo	TEAM Unity	Kabalikat ng Malayang Pilipino	11,803,107	40.01
Alan Peter Cayetano	Genuine Opposition	Nacionalista Party	11,787,679	39.96
Gregorio Honasan	Independent		11,605,531	39.34
Antonio Trillanes	Genuine Opposition	United Opposition	11,189,671	37.93
Juan Miguel Zubiri (Note: Zubiri was later removed from office in favor of Koko Pimentel who won an election protest.)	TEAM Unity	Lakas–CMD	11,005,866	37.31
Koko Pimentel	Genuine Opposition	PDP–Laban	10,987,347	37.25
Ralph Recto	TEAM Unity	Lakas–CMD	10,721,252	36.34
Mike Defensor	TEAM Unity	Lakas–CMD	9,938,995	33.69
Prospero Pichay Jr.	TEAM Unity	Lakas–CMD	9,798,622	33.22
Sonia Roco	Genuine Opposition	Aksyon Demokratiko	8,457,748	28.67
Cesar Montano	TEAM Unity	Lakas–CMD	7,800,451	26.44
Tito Sotto	TEAM Unity	Nationalist People's Coalition	7,638,361	25.89
John Henry Osmeña	Genuine Opposition	United Opposition	7,267,048	24.64
Vicente Magsaysay	TEAM Unity	Lakas–CMD	6,357,905	21.55
Nikki Coseteng	Genuine Opposition	Independent	5,274,682	17.88
Tessie Aquino-Oreta	TEAM Unity	Nationalist People's Coalition	4,362,065	14.79
Chavit Singson	TEAM Unity	Lakas–CMD	4,353,644	14.76
Richard Gomez	Independent		2,725,664	9.24
Jamalul Kiram III	TEAM Unity	Partido Demokratiko Sosyalista ng Pilipinas	2,488,994	8.44
Melchor Chavez	Kilusang Bagong Lipunan		843,702	2.86
Martin Bautista	Ang Kapatiran		761,165	2.58
Zosimo Paredes	Ang Kapatiran		713,817	2.42
Joselito Pepito Cayetano	Kilusang Bagong Lipunan		510,366	1.73
Adrian Sison	Ang Kapatiran		402,331	1.36
Oliver Lozano	Kilusang Bagong Lipunan		305,647	1.04
Antonio Estrella	Kilusang Bagong Lipunan		285,488	0.97
Victor Wood	Kilusang Bagong Lipunan		283,036	0.96
Felix Cantal	Philippine Green Republican Party		123,608	0.42
Eduardo Orpilla	Kilusang Bagong Lipunan		107,532	0.36
Ruben Enciso	Kilusang Bagong Lipunan		100,523	0.34
Total			269,118,284	100.00
Total votes			29,498,660	–
Registered voters/turnout			43,104,362	68.44
Source: COMELEC

=== House of Representatives ===
==== Elections at congressional districts ====
Party	Seats	+/–
Lakas–CMD	89	−3
Kabalikat ng Malayang Pilipino	44	+42
Nationalist People's Coalition	28	−25
Liberal Party	23	−6
Nacionalista Party	11	+9
Laban ng Demokratikong Pilipino	5	−10
PDP–Laban	5	+3
Pwersa ng Masang Pilipino	4	−1
Partido Demokratiko Sosyalista ng Pilipinas	3	+2
Kilusang Bagong Lipunan	1	0
Lingkod Taguig	1	New
Independent	4	0
Party-list seats	53	+1
Total	271	+10

==== Party-list election ====
Party	Votes	%	+/–	Seats	+/–
Buhay Party-List	1,169,338	7.62	+1.75	3	+1
Bayan Muna (Note: Proclaimed to have won an additional seat on April 24, 2009 by virtue of a Supreme Court ruling nullifying certain provisions of the Party-List Law as unconstitutional.)	979,189	6.38	−3.35	3	0
Citizens' Battle Against Corruption	755,735	4.93	+0.83	2	0
Gabriela Women's Party	621,266	4.05	+0.23	2	0
APEC Partylist	619,733	4.04	−3.48	2	−1
A Teacher Partylist	490,853	3.20	New	2	New
Akbayan	466,448	3.04	−3.79	2	−1
Alagad	423,165	2.76	−0.04	2	+1
Coop-NATCCO	409,987	2.67	+0.43	2	+1
Butil Farmers Party	409,168	2.67	−0.82	2	0
Alliance of Rural Concerns	374,349	2.44	New	2	New
Anakpawis	370,323	2.41	−1.92	2	0
Anak Mindanao	347,527	2.27	+0.05	2	+1
Abono	340,002	2.22	New	2	New
You Against Corruption and Poverty	331,623	2.16	New	2	New
AGAP Partylist	328,814	2.14	New	2	New
An Waray	321,516	2.10	−0.10	2	+1
United Movement Against Drug (Note: Proclaimed have a seat on April 24, 2009 by virtue of a Supreme Court ruling nullifying certain provisions of the Party-List Law as unconstitutional.)	251,804	1.64	New	1	New
Arts, Business and Science Professionals	235,152	1.53	New	1	New
Ang Laban ng Indiginong Filipino	229,267	1.49	−0.68	1	0
Kapatiran ng mga na Kulong na Walang Sala	229,036	1.49	New	1	New
Kabataan	228,700	1.49	−0.24	1	New
ABA AKO Partylist	219,363	1.43	−0.61	1	New
Senior Citizens Partylist	213,095	1.39	−0.53	1	New
Aangat Tayo	200,030	1.30	New	1	New
Veterans Freedom Party	196,358	1.28	−1.45	1	0
Alliance for Nationalism and Democracy	188,573	1.23	−0.74	1	0
Barangay Natin	177,068	1.15	−0.33	1	New
Kasangga sa Kaunlaran	170,594	1.11	New	1	New
Bantay Partylist	169,869	1.11	+0.73	1	New
Abakada Guro	166,897	1.09	New	1	New
1-United Transport Coalition	165,012	1.08	New	1	New
Trade Union Congress Party	162,678	1.06	−0.56	1	New
Philippine Coconut Producers Federation	156,007	1.02	−0.32	1	New
AGHAM Partylist	146,062	0.95	New	0	0
Angat Ating Kabuhayan Pilipinas	141,860	0.92	New	0	0
Abanse! Pinay	130,649	0.85	−0.09	0	0
Partido ng Manggagawa	119,082	0.78	−2.78	0	−1
Suara Bangsamoro	114,024	0.74	−0.58	0	0
Assalam Bangsamoro People's Party	113,966	0.74	−0.01	0	0
Alliance of Volunteer Educators	111,002	0.72	−2.01	0	0
Democratic Independent Workers Association	107,193	0.70	New	0	0
Alliance of Neo-Conservatives	99,658	0.65	New	0	0
Sanlakas	97,425	0.64	−0.88	0	0
Alliance for Barangay Concerns	90,125	0.59	New	0	0
Kalahi-Advocates for Overseas Filipinos	89,461	0.58	New	0	0
Ahonbayan	80,932	0.53	−0.03	0	0
Akbay Pinoy OFW-National	79,460	0.52	New	0	0
Biyaheng Pinoy	78,716	0.51	New	0	0
Bigkis Pinoy Movement	77,351	0.50	−0.98	0	0
People's Movement Against Poverty	75,230	0.49	−0.67	0	0
Alyansa ng May Kapansanang Pinoy	74,704	0.49	−0.21	0	0
PBA Partylist	72,395	0.47	New	0	0
Confederation of Grains Retailers Association of the Philippines	62,247	0.41	+0.12	0	0
Bagong Tao Movement	61,089	0.40	−0.04	0	0
Novelty Entrepreneurship and Livelihood For Food	58,773	0.38	+0.10	0	0
SMILE Partylist	58,772	0.38	−0.68	0	0
Aksyon Sambayanan	57,032	0.37	New	0	0
Bago National Cultural Society of the Philippines	55,852	0.36	New	0	0
Bandila Partylist	54,779	0.36	New	0	0
Ahon Pinoy	54,628	0.36	New	0	0
Advocates for Special Children and the Handicapped Movement	51,805	0.34	New	0	0
Agbiag	50,878	0.33	New	0	0
Seaman's Party	50,605	0.33	−0.32	0	0
Action for Dynamic Development	48,665	0.32	New	0	0
Bahandi Sa Kaumahan Ug Kadagatan	46,640	0.30	−0.19	0	0
Asosasyon ng mga Maliliit na Negosyanteng Gumaganap	43,154	0.28	New	0	0
Alay sa Bayan ng Malayang Propesyonal at Repormang Kalakal	42,308	0.28	New	0	0
Babae Para sa Kaunlaran	36,531	0.24	New	0	0
Sulong! Barangay Movement	34,893	0.23	New	0	0
Alyansa ng Sambayanan Para sa Pagbabago	34,117	0.22	−0.18	0	0
Parents Enabling Parents Coalition Party	34,054	0.22	+0.21	0	0
Abante Ilonggo	33,928	0.22	New	0	0
Alliance of Vendors and Traders of the Philippines	33,726	0.22	New	0	0
Action for Democracy and Development for the Tribal People	33,209	0.22	New	0	0
Alyansa ng Mamamayang Naghihirap	32,270	0.21	New	0	0
Angat Antas Kabuhayan Pilipino Movement	29,190	0.19	New	0	0
Association of Administrators Professionals and Seniors	26,305	0.17	New	0	0
Hanay ng Aping Pinoy	25,947	0.17	New	0	0
Sandigang Maralita	23,239	0.15	+0.09	0	0
Alliance of Associations of Accredited Workers in the Water Sector	22,963	0.15	New	0	0
Ang Galing Pinoy	16,975	0.11	New	0	0
Aging Pilipino Organization	16,759	0.11	−0.12	0	0
Alliance of People's Organization	16,442	0.11	New	0	0
Biyayang Bukid	16,286	0.11	New	0	0
Alliance Transport Sector	14,196	0.09	New	0	0
Union of the Masses for Democracy and Justice	9,624	0.06	New	0	0
Kabukluran ng mga Kababaihang Filipina sa Timog Katagalugan	8,930	0.06	New	0	0
Youth League for Peace Advancement	8,495	0.06	New	0	0
Kasosyo Producer-Consumer Exchange Association	8,422	0.05	New	0	0
Koalisyon ng Katutubong Samahan ng Pilipinas	6,246	0.04	New	0	0
Total	15,337,808	100.00	–	53	+25
Valid votes	16,024,795	53.32	+17.49		
Invalid/blank votes (Note: Includes 385,956 votes for BATAS Partylist, which the Commission on Elections (COMELEC) cancelled its registration on November 19, 2007, and 301,031 votes for FPJPM Partylist which the COMELEC cancelled its registration on July 1, 2008)	14,031,900	46.68	−17.49		
Total votes	30,056,695	100.00	–		
Registered voters/turnout	43,180,216	69.61	−9.53		
Source: COMELEC

=== Local elections ===
All local positions are disputed in the elections, with the candidate with the most votes for governor, vice-governor, mayor and vice-mayor being declared as the winner. Winners for the positions for board members and councilors depends on the size of the assembly.

- Local tallies partial and unofficial complete (Archived)

==== Gubernatorial elections ====
The following are the results of the gubernatorial elections by party:

Party	Seats
Lakas–NUCD–UMDP	39
Kabalikat ng Malayang Pilipino	16
Liberal Party	9
Nationalist People's Coalition	9
Kabalikat ng Malayang Pilipino/Laban ng Demokratikong Pilipino	1
Laban ng Demokratikong Pilipino	1
Nacionalista Party	1
Independents	4
Total	80
Source: Commission on Elections

The following are the results of the gubernatorial elections by province:

Province	Elected governor	Party
Abra	Takit Bersamin	Kampi
Agusan del Norte	Erlpe John Amante	Kampi
Agusan del Sur	Maria Valentina Plaza	Lakas
Aklan	Carlito Marquez	Lakas
Albay	Joey Salceda	Independent
Antique	Salvacion Z. Perez	NPC
Apayao	Elias Bulut Sr.	Kampi
Aurora	Bella Angara	LDP
Basilan	Jum Jainudin Akbar	Liberal
Bataan	Joet Garcia	Lakas
Batanes	Telesforo Castillejos	Lakas
Batangas	Vilma Santos	Lakas
Benguet	Nestor Fongwan	Kampi
Biliran	Rogelio Espina	Lakas
Bohol	Erico Aumentado	Lakas
Bukidnon	Jose Maria Zubiri Jr.	Lakas
Bulacan	Jonjon Mendoza	Kampi
Cagayan	Alvaro Antonio	Lakas
Camarines Norte	Jesus Typoco Jr.	Lakas
Camarines Sur	Luis Raymund Villafuerte	Lakas
Camiguin	Jurdin Jesus Romualdo	NPC
Capiz	Victor Tanco	Liberal
Catanduanes	Joseph Cua	Independent
Cavite	Ayong Maliksi	Liberal
Cebu	Gwendolyn Garcia	Kampi
Compostela Valley	Arturo Uy	Lakas
Cotabato	Jesus Sacdalan	Lakas
Davao del Norte	Rodolfo del Rosario	Lakas
Davao del Sur	Douglas Cagas	Lakas
Davao Oriental	Corazon Malanyaon	Kampi
Dinagat Islands	Jade Ecleo	Lakas
Eastern Samar	Ben Evardone	Lakas
Guimaras	Felipe Nava	Kampi
Ifugao	Teddy Baguilat	Liberal
Ilocos Norte	Michael Marcos Keon	Kampi
Ilocos Sur	Deogracias Victor Savellano	Lakas
Iloilo	Niel Tupas	Liberal
Isabela	Grace Padaca	Liberal
Kalinga	Floydelia Diasen	Lakas
La Union	Manuel Ortega	NPC
Laguna	Teresita Lazaro	Lakas
Lanao del Norte	Mohamad Khalid Dimaporo	Lakas
Lanao del Sur	Mamintal Adiong Jr.	Lakas
Leyte	Jericho Petilla	Lakas
Maguindanao	Andal Ampatuan Sr.	Lakas
Marinduque	Jose Antonio Carrion	Independent
Masbate	Olga Kho	Lakas
Misamis Occidental	Loreto Leo Ocampos	Lakas
Misamis Oriental	Oscar Moreno	Lakas
Mountain Province	Maximo Dalog	Lakas
Negros Occidental	Joseph Marañon	NPC
Negros Oriental	Emilio Macias II	NPC
Northern Samar	Raul Daza	Liberal
Nueva Ecija	Aurelio Umali	Lakas
Nueva Vizcaya	Luisa Cuaresma	Nacionalista
Occidental Mindoro	Josephine Sato	NPC
Oriental Mindoro	Arnan Panaligan	Lakas
Palawan	Mario Joel Reyes	Lakas
Pampanga	Eddie Panlilio	Independent
Pangasinan	Amado Espino Jr.	Kampi
Quezon	Rafael Nantes	Liberal
Quirino	Dakila Cua	Lakas
Rizal	Casimiro Ynares III	NPC
Romblon	Natalio Beltran III	Lakas
Samar	Milagrosa Tan	Kampi
Sarangani	Miguel Rene Dominguez	Kampi
Siquijor	Orlando Fua Jr.	Lakas
Sorsogon	Sally Lee	Lakas
South Cotabato	Daisy Fuentes	NPC
Southern Leyte	Damian Mercado	Lakas
Sultan Kudarat	Suharto Mangudadatu	Kampi
Sulu	Abdusakur Mahail Tan	Kampi
Surigao del Norte	Robert Ace Barbers	Lakas
Surigao del Sur	Vicente Pimentel Jr.	Lakas
Tarlac	Jose Yap	NPC
Tawi-Tawi	Sadikul Sahali	Lakas
Zambales	Amor Deloso	Liberal
Zamboanga del Norte	Rolando Yebes	Kampi
Zamboanga del Sur	Aurora E. Cerilles	Kampi
Zamboanga Sibugay	George T. Hofer	Kampi/LDP
Source: Commission on Elections

==== Vice gubernatorial elections ====
The following are the results of the vice gubernatorial elections by party:

Party	Seats
Lakas–NUCD–UMDP	31
Kabalikat ng Malayang Pilipino	22
Liberal Party	9
Nationalist People's Coalition	8
Nacionalista Party	2
Kilusang Bagong Lipunan	1
Pwersa ng Masang Pilipino	1
United Opposition	1
Independents	5
Total	80
Source: Commission on Elections

The following are the results of the vice gubernatorial elections by province:

Province	Elected vice governor	Party
Abra	Victorino Baroña Jr.	Kampi
Agusan del Norte	Enrico Corvera	Kampi
Agusan del Sur	Santiago Cane Jr.	Lakas
Aklan	Gabrielle Calizo-Quimpo	Nacionalista
Albay	Brando Sael	Independent
Antique	Rhodora Cadiao	Lakas
Apayao	Hector Reuel Pascua	Lakas
Aurora	Gerardo Noveras	PMP
Basilan	Al-Rasheed Ahmad Sakkalahul	Liberal
Bataan	Serafin Roman	Kampi
Batanes	William Agsunod	Lakas
Batangas	Mark Leviste	Kampi
Benguet	Cresencio Pacalso	Lakas
Biliran	Lucila Curso	Lakas
Bohol	Julius Caesar Herrera	Lakas
Bukidnon	Alex Calingasan	Lakas
Bulacan	Wilhelmino Sy-Alvarado	Lakas
Cagayan	Leonides Fausto	Liberal
Camarines Norte	Roy Padilla Jr.	NPC
Camarines Sur	Salvio Fortuno	Lakas
Camiguin	Leo Lasacar	Lakas
Capiz	Felipe Barredo	Liberal
Catanduanes	Alfred Aquino	Independent
Cavite	Dencito Campaña	Liberal
Cebu	Gregorio Sanchez Jr.	Kampi
Compostela Valley	Ramil Gentugaya	Lakas
Cotabato	Emmanuel Piñol	Lakas
Davao del Norte	Victorio Suaybaguio Jr.	Lakas
Davao del Sur	Simplicio Latasa	NPC
Davao Oriental	Joel Mayo Almario	Lakas
Dinagat Islands	Elvis dela Merced	Lakas
Eastern Samar	Leander Geli	Lakas
Guimaras	Aurelio Tionado	Kampi
Ifugao	Nora Dinamling	Liberal
Ilocos Norte	Windell Chua	KBL
Ilocos Sur	Jerry Singson	Lakas
Iloilo	Rolex Suplico	Independent
Isabela	Ramon Reyes	Lakas
Kalinga	Jocel Baac	Liberal
La Union	Eulogio Clarence Martin de Guzman III	NPC
Laguna	Ramil Hernandez	UNO
Lanao del Norte	Irma Ali	Lakas
Lanao del Sur	Arsad Marohombsar	Lakas
Leyte	Maria Mimietta Bagulaya	Liberal
Maguindanao	Sajid Ampatuan	Kampi
Marinduque	Tomas Pizarro	Independent
Masbate	Vicente Revil	Kampi
Misamis Occidental	Francisco Paylaga Jr.	Kampi
Misamis Oriental	Norris Babiera	Lakas
Mountain Province	Louis Claver Jr.	Independent
Negros Occidental	Isidro Zayco	Lakas
Negros Oriental	Jose Baldado	Kampi
Northern Samar	Antonio Lucero	Liberal
Nueva Ecija	Edward Thomas Joson	Kampi
Nueva Vizcaya	Jose Gambito	Nacionalista
Occidental Mindoro	Mario Gene Mendiola	NPC
Oriental Mindoro	Maria Estela Felipa Aceron	Lakas
Palawan	David Ponce de Leon	NPC
Pampanga	Yeng Guiao	Kampi
Pangasinan	Marlyn Primicias-Agabas	Kampi
Quezon	Carlos Portes	Kampi
Quirino	Pasencia Bacani	Kampi
Rizal	Frisco San Juan Jr.	NPC
Romblon	Alicia Fetalvero	Kampi
Samar	Jesus Redaja	Kampi
Sarangani	Steve Solon	Kampi
Siquijor	Andre Jesu Cortes	Lakas
Sorsogon	Renato Laurinaria	Lakas
South Cotabato	Eliordo Ogena	NPC
Southern Leyte	Miguel Maamo II	Lakas
Sultan Kudarat	Donato Ligo	Kampi
Sulu	Nur-Ana Sahidulla	Kampi
Surigao del Norte	Noel Catre	Lakas
Surigao del Sur	Librado Navarro	Lakas
Tarlac	Marcelino Aganon Jr.	NPC
Tawi-Tawi	Ruby Sahali	Lakas
Zambales	Anne Marie Gordon	Liberal
Zamboanga del Norte	Francis Olvis	Kampi
Zamboanga del Sur	Roseller Ariosa	Kampi
Zamboanga Sibugay	Rey Andre Olegario	Lakas
Source: Commission on Elections

==== Provincial board elections ====
The following are the results of the provincial board elections by party:

Party	Seats
Lakas–NUCD–UMDP	318
Kabalikat ng Malayang Pilipino	172
Nationalist People's Coalition	81
Liberal Party	64
Laban ng Demokratikong Pilipino	13
United Opposition	11
Nacionalista Party	9
Sarangani Reconciliation and Reformation Organization/Lakas–NUCD–UMDP	7
Bagong Lakas ng Nueva Ecija/Kabalikat ng Malayang Pilipino	6
Pwersa ng Masang Pilipino	6
Kilusang Bagong Lipunan	5
Liberal Party/Lakas–NUCD–UMDP	5
Nationalist People's Coalition/United Negros Alliance	4
Kabalikat ng Malayang Pilipino/Bagong Lakas ng Nueva Ecija	3
Lakas–NUCD–UMDP/Nationalist People's Coalition	3
Sarangani Reconciliation and Reformation Organization/Kabalikat ng Malayang Pilipino	3
Alliance for Barangay Concerns	2
Barug Alang sa Kauswagan ug Demokrasya/Nationalist People's Coalition	2
Lakas–NUCD–UMDP/Kabalikat ng Malayang Pilipino	2
Partido Demokratiko Sosyalista ng Pilipinas	2
Partido Padajon Surigao	2
Aksyon Demokratiko	1
Independent Nacionalistas and Allies/Nationalist People's Coalition	1
Kabalikat ng Malayang Pilipino/Laban ng Demokratikong Pilipino	1
Kabalikat ng Malayang Pilipino/Lakas–NUCD–UMDP	1
Laban ng Demokratikong Pilipino/Lakas–NUCD–UMDP	1
Lakas–NUCD–UMDP/Laban ng Demokratikong Pilipino	1
Lakas–NUCD–UMDP/Liberal Party	1
PDP–Laban	1
No party	1
Independents	31
Total	760
Source: Commission on Elections

The following are the results of the provincial board elections by province:

Province	Elected seats	Party	Seats won
Abra	8	Kampi	5
Abra	8	PDSP	2
Abra	8	Independent	1
Agusan del Norte	8	Kampi	8
Agusan del Sur	10	Lakas	9
Agusan del Sur	10	Independent	1
Aklan	10	Lakas	3
Aklan	10	Liberal	3
Aklan	10	Kampi	2
Aklan	10	Nacionalista	2
Albay	10	Lakas	6
Albay	10	NPC	1
Albay	10	Independent	3
Antique	10	Lakas	5
Antique	10	NPC	4
Antique	10	Independent	1
Apayao	8	Lakas	6
Apayao	8	Kampi	1
Apayao	8	NPC	1
Aurora	8	LDP	7
Aurora	8	Lakas	1
Basilan	8	Lakas	4
Basilan	8	Liberal	4
Bataan	10	Kampi	4
Bataan	10	Lakas	4
Bataan	10	NPC	2
Batanes	6	Lakas	5
Batanes	6	Liberal	1
Batangas	10	Kampi	5
Batangas	10	Lakas	4
Batangas	10	No party	1
Benguet	10	Lakas	4
Benguet	10	Kampi	3
Benguet	10	LDP	2
Benguet	10	NPC	1
Biliran	8	Lakas	8
Bohol	10	Lakas	9
Bohol	10	PDP–Laban	1
Bukidnon	10	Lakas	10
Bulacan	10	Kampi	7
Bulacan	10	Lakas	2
Bulacan	10	PMP	1
Cagayan	10	NPC	6
Cagayan	10	Liberal	3
Cagayan	10	Kampi	1
Camarines Norte	10	UNO	7
Camarines Norte	10	Kampi	2
Camarines Norte	10	Lakas	1
Camarines Sur	10	Lakas	5
Camarines Sur	10	Kampi	3
Camarines Sur	10	NPC	2
Camiguin	6	Lakas	6
Capiz	10	Liberal	10
Catanduanes	8	Lakas	5
Catanduanes	8	NPC	3
Cavite	10	Liberal	8
Cavite	10	Kampi	1
Cavite	10	Lakas	1
Cebu	12	Kampi	7
Cebu	12	Lakas	2
Cebu	12	Bakud/NPC	2
Cebu	12	Independent	1
Compostela Valley	10	Lakas	7
Compostela Valley	10	Kampi	2
Compostela Valley	10	Liberal	1
Cotabato	10	Kampi	8
Cotabato	10	Lakas	2
Davao del Norte	10	Lakas	10
Davao del Sur	10	NPC	9
Davao del Sur	10	Lakas	1
Davao Oriental	10	Lakas	5
Davao Oriental	10	Kampi	4
Davao Oriental	10	Lakas/Kampi	1
Dinagat Islands	10	Lakas	8
Dinagat Islands	10	Independent	2
Eastern Samar	10	Lakas	9
Eastern Samar	10	PMP	1
Guimaras	8	Kampi	7
Guimaras	8	Lakas	1
Ifugao	8	Lakas	3
Ifugao	8	Independent	5
Ilocos Norte	10	KBL	5
Ilocos Norte	10	Lakas	2
Ilocos Norte	10	Kampi	2
Ilocos Norte	10	Aksyon	1
Ilocos Sur	10	Lakas	9
Ilocos Sur	10	Independent	1
Iloilo	10	Lakas	6
Iloilo	10	Liberal	3
Iloilo	10	Independent	1
Isabela	10	Lakas	5
Isabela	10	NPC	4
Isabela	10	Kampi	1
Kalinga	8	Liberal	6
Kalinga	8	NPC	1
Kalinga	8	Independent	1
La Union	10	NPC	4
La Union	10	Lakas	3
La Union	10	Liberal	2
La Union	10	Kampi	1
Laguna	10	Lakas	6
Laguna	10	UNO	2
Laguna	10	LDP	1
Laguna	10	NPC	1
Lanao del Norte	10	Lakas	10
Lanao del Sur	10	Lakas	6
Lanao del Sur	10	Kampi	2
Lanao del Sur	10	Independent	2
Leyte	10	Lakas	8
Leyte	10	LDP	1
Leyte	10	Liberal	1
Maguindanao	10	Lakas	10
Marinduque	8	Lakas	4
Marinduque	8	Kampi	2
Marinduque	8	ABC	1
Marinduque	8	Independent	1
Masbate	10	Kampi	5
Masbate	10	Lakas	3
Masbate	10	INA/NPC	1
Masbate	10	NPC	1
Misamis Occidental	10	Kampi	7
Misamis Occidental	10	Lakas	2
Misamis Occidental	10	LDP	1
Misamis Oriental	10	Lakas	9
Misamis Oriental	10	ABC	1
Mountain Province	8	Lakas	2
Mountain Province	8	LDP/Lakas	1
Mountain Province	8	Independent	5
Negros Occidental	12	NPC/UNegA	4
Negros Occidental	12	Lakas	3
Negros Occidental	12	NPC	3
Negros Occidental	12	Kampi	2
Negros Oriental	10	NPC	4
Negros Oriental	10	Kampi	3
Negros Oriental	10	Lakas	3
Northern Samar	10	Liberal	6
Northern Samar	10	Kampi	2
Northern Samar	10	Lakas	2
Nueva Ecija	10	Balane/Kampi	6
Nueva Ecija	10	Kampi/Balane	3
Nueva Ecija	10	Lakas	1
Nueva Vizcaya	10	Nacionalista	5
Nueva Vizcaya	10	Lakas	3
Nueva Vizcaya	10	Kampi	2
Occidental Mindoro	10	NPC	5
Occidental Mindoro	10	Kampi	4
Occidental Mindoro	10	Independent	1
Oriental Mindoro	10	Lakas	4
Oriental Mindoro	10	Liberal	3
Oriental Mindoro	10	Lakas/Liberal	1
Oriental Mindoro	10	LDP	1
Oriental Mindoro	10	PMP	1
Palawan	10	Lakas	5
Palawan	10	Kampi	2
Palawan	10	NPC	2
Palawan	10	Lakas/LDP	1
Pampanga	10	Kampi	5
Pampanga	10	Lakas	3
Pampanga	10	NPC	2
Pangasinan	12	Lakas	7
Pangasinan	12	Kampi	2
Pangasinan	12	Lakas/Kampi	1
Pangasinan	12	NPC	1
Pangasinan	12	PMP	1
Quezon	10	Kampi	5
Quezon	10	Liberal	5
Quirino	8	Lakas	4
Quirino	8	Kampi	3
Quirino	8	Liberal	1
Rizal	10	NPC	5
Rizal	10	Kampi	2
Rizal	10	Liberal	1
Rizal	10	Independent	2
Romblon	8	Lakas	5
Romblon	8	Kampi	3
Samar	10	Liberal/Lakas	5
Samar	10	Kampi	3
Samar	10	Lakas	1
Samar	10	Independent	1
Sarangani	10	SARRO/Lakas	7
Sarangani	10	SARRO/Kampi	3
Siquijor	8	Lakas	7
Siquijor	8	UNO	1
Sorsogon	10	Lakas	3
Sorsogon	10	Lakas/NPC	3
Sorsogon	10	Nacionalista	2
Sorsogon	10	Kampi/Lakas	1
Sorsogon	10	UNO	1
South Cotabato	10	NPC	10
Southern Leyte	8	Lakas	6
Southern Leyte	8	Kampi	1
Southern Leyte	8	NPC	1
Sultan Kudarat	10	Kampi	10
Sulu	8	Lakas	4
Sulu	8	Kampi	3
Sulu	8	Independent	1
Surigao del Norte	10	Lakas	5
Surigao del Norte	10	Kampi	3
Surigao del Norte	10	PPS	2
Surigao del Sur	10	Kampi	5
Surigao del Sur	10	Lakas	5
Tarlac	10	NPC	8
Tarlac	10	Kampi	2
Tawi-Tawi	8	Lakas	6
Tawi-Tawi	8	Kampi	1
Tawi-Tawi	8	Liberal	1
Zambales	10	Liberal	5
Zambales	10	Lakas	3
Zambales	10	PMP	2
Zamboanga del Norte	10	Kampi	9
Zamboanga del Norte	10	Lakas	1
Zamboanga del Sur	10	Kampi	10
Zamboanga Sibugay	8	Lakas	6
Zamboanga Sibugay	8	Kampi/LDP	1
Zamboanga Sibugay	8	Independent	1
Source: Commission on Elections

==== Mayoral elections ====
The following are the results of the mayoral elections in highly urbanized and independent component cities and independent municipalities by party:

Party	Seats
Lakas–NUCD–UMDP	17
Nationalist People's Coalition	4
Kabalikat ng Malayang Pilipino	3
PDP–Laban	3
Laban ng Demokratikong Pilipino	2
Pwersa ng Masang Pilipino	2
Kilusang Diwa ng Taguig	1
Liberal Party	1
Partido Navoteño	1
Partido Demokratiko Sosyalista ng Pilipinas	1
United Opposition	1
Independents	1
Total	37
Source: Commission on Elections

The following are the results of the mayoral elections in highly urbanized and independent component cities and independent municipalities:

City/Municipality	Elected mayor	Party
Angeles City	Francis Nepomuceno	NPC
Bacolod	Evelio Leonardia	NPC
Baguio	Reinaldo Bautista Jr.	Kampi
Butuan	Democrito Plaza II	Lakas
Cagayan de Oro	Constantino Jaraula	Lakas
Caloocan	Recom Echiverri	Lakas
Cebu City	Tomas Osmeña	Lakas
Cotabato City	Muslimin Sema	Lakas
Dagupan	Alipio Fernandez Jr.	Lakas
Davao City	Rodrigo Duterte	PDP–Laban
General Santos	Pedro Acharon Jr.	NPC
Iligan	Lawrence Cruz	LDP
Iloilo City	Jerry Treñas	Lakas
Lapu-Lapu City	Arturo Radaza	Lakas
Las Piñas	Vergel Aguilar	Independent
Lucena	Ramon Talaga Jr.	Kampi
Makati	Jejomar Binay	PDP–Laban
Malabon	Canuto Oreta	Lakas
Mandaluyong	Benhur Abalos	Lakas
Mandaue	Jonas Cortes	PDSP
Manila	Alfredo Lim	UNO
Marikina	Marides Fernando	Lakas
Muntinlupa	Aldrin San Pedro	PMP
Naga	Jesse Robredo	Liberal
Navotas	Toby Tiangco	Navoteño
Olongapo	James Gordon	Lakas
Ormoc	Eric Codilla	Lakas
Parañaque	Florencio Bernabe Jr.	Lakas
Pasay	Wenceslao Trinidad	LDP
Pasig	Bobby Eusebio	Kampi
Pateros	Jaime Medina	PDP–Laban
Quezon City	Feliciano Belmonte Jr.	Lakas
San Juan	JV Ejercito	PMP
Santiago	Amelita Navarro	Lakas
Taguig	Sigfrido Tiñga	KDT
Valenzuela	Sherwin Gatchalian	NPC
Zamboanga City	Celso Lobregat	Lakas
Source: Commission on Elections

==== Vice mayoral elections ====
The following are the results of the vice mayoral elections in highly urbanized and independent component cities and independent municipalities by party:

Party	Seats
Lakas–NUCD–UMDP	14
Kabalikat ng Malayang Pilipino	4
PDP–Laban	4
Nationalist People's Coalition	3
United Opposition	2
Aksyon Demokratiko	1
Kabalikat ng Malayang Pilipino/Nacionalista Party	1
Kilusang Diwa ng Taguig	1
Laban ng Demokratikong Pilipino	1
Lakas–NUCD–UMDP/Kabalikat ng Malayang Pilipino	1
Liberal Party	1
Partido Navoteño	1
Partido Demokratiko Sosyalista ng Pilipinas	1
Pwersa ng Masang Pilipino	1
Pwersa ng Masang Pilipino/Nationalist People's Coalition	1
Total	37
Source: Commission on Elections

The following are the results of the vice mayoral elections in highly urbanized and independent component cities and independent municipalities:

City/Municipality	Elected mayor	Party
Angeles City	Vicky Vega	Kampi
Bacolod	Jude Thaddeus Sayson	NPC
Baguio	Daniel Fariñas	Kampi/Nacionalista
Butuan	Dino Claudio Sanchez	Lakas
Cagayan de Oro	Vicente Emano	Lakas
Caloocan	Tito Varela	Kampi
Cebu City	Mike Rama	Lakas
Cotabato City	Japal Guiani Jr.	UNO
Dagupan	Belen Fernandez	Lakas
Davao City	Sara Duterte	PDP–Laban
General Santos	Florentina Congson	NPC
Iligan	Henry Dy	UNO
Iloilo City	Jed Patrick Mabilog	Lakas
Lapu-Lapu City	Mario Amores	Lakas
Las Piñas	Henry Medina	Lakas
Lucena	Philip Castillo	PDSP
Makati	Ernesto Mercado	PDP–Laban
Malabon	Arnold Vicencio	PMP/NPC
Mandaluyong	Renato Santa Maria	Lakas
Mandaue	Carlo Fortuna	Lakas/Kampi
Manila	Isko Moreno	PDP–Laban
Marikina	Marion Andres	Lakas
Muntinlupa	Artemio Simundac	Lakas
Naga	Gabriel Bordado	Liberal
Navotas	Patrick Joseph Javier	Navoteño
Olongapo	Cynthia Cajudo	Lakas
Ormoc	Nepomuceno Aparis	Kampi
Parañaque	Gustavo Tambunting	Aksyon
Pasay	Antonino Calixto	LDP
Pasig	Yoyong Martirez	Kampi
Pateros	Jose Jonathan Sanchez	PDP–Laban
Quezon City	Herbert Bautista	Lakas
San Juan	Leonardo Celles	PMP
Santiago	Alvin Abaya	Lakas
Taguig	George Elias	KDT
Valenzuela	Eric Martinez	Lakas
Zamboanga City	Mannix Dalipe	NPC
Source: Commission on Elections

==== City and municipal council elections ====
The following are the results of the city and municipal council elections in highly urbanized and independent component cities and independent municipalities by party:

Party	Seats
Lakas–NUCD–UMDP	212
Liberal Party	50
Kabalikat ng Mamamayang Pilipino	34
PDP–Laban	32
Nationalist People's Coalition	27
Laban ng Demokratikong Pilipino	19
Kilusang Diwa ng Taguig	14
Pwersa ng Masang Pilipino	13
United Opposition	12
Partido Navoteño	11
Lakas–NUCD–UMDP/Biskeg	9
Lakas–NUCD–UMDP/Kabalikat ng Mamamayang Pilipino	8
United Opposition/Laban ng Demokratikong Pilipino	7
Pwersa ng Masang Pilipino/UNO	6
Pwersa ng Masang Pilipino/Achievers with Integrity Movement	5
Nationalist People's Coalition/Achievers with Integrity Movement	4
Aksyon Demokratiko	3
Laban ng Demokratikong Pilipino/UNO	2
Nacionalista Party	2
Partido Demokratiko Sosyalista ng Pilipinas	2
PDP–Laban/UNO	2
UNO/Achievers with Integrity Movement	2
Ang Kapatiran	1
Bayan Muna	1
Lakas–NUCD–UMDP/Liberal Party	1
Nationalist People's Coalition/UNO	1
Ugyon Party	1
UNO/Partido Demokratiko Sosyalista ng Pilipinas	1
Independents	18
Total	500
Source: Commission on Elections

The following are the results of the city and municipal council elections in highly urbanized and independent component cities and independent municipalities:

City/municipality	Elected seats	Party	Seats won
Angeles City	10	Lakas	6
Angeles City	10	Kampi	2
Angeles City	10	NPC	2
Bacolod	12	NPC	8
Bacolod	12	Lakas	2
Bacolod	12	Independent	2
Baguio	12	Lakas	3
Baguio	12	Kampi	1
Baguio	12	LDP/UNO	1
Baguio	12	Nacionalista	1
Baguio	12	UNO/PDSP	1
Baguio	12	UNO	1
Baguio	12	Independent	4
Butuan	10	Lakas	8
Butuan	10	Kampi	1
Butuan	10	Liberal	1
Cagayan de Oro	16	Lakas	13
Cagayan de Oro	16	PDP–Laban/UNO	2
Cagayan de Oro	16	Independent	1
Caloocan	12	Lakas	11
Caloocan	12	PMP/UNO	1
Cebu City	16	Lakas	16
Cotabato City	10	Lakas	5
Cotabato City	10	UNO	5
Dagupan	10	Lakas/Biskeg	9
Dagupan	10	PDP–Laban	1
Davao City	24	PDP–Laban	9
Davao City	24	Lakas	8
Davao City	24	NPC	3
Davao City	24	Bayan Muna	1
Davao City	24	Liberal	1
Davao City	24	Independent	2
General Santos	12	PMP/AIM	5
General Santos	12	NPC/AIM	4
General Santos	12	UNO/AIM	2
General Santos	12	Kampi	1
Iligan	10	UNO	5
Iligan	10	LDP	4
Iligan	10	Kampi	1
Iloilo City	12	Lakas	9
Iloilo City	12	Kampi	1
Iloilo City	12	PDP–Laban	1
Iloilo City	12	Ugyon	1
Lapu-Lapu City	10	Lakas	9
Lapu-Lapu City	10	Kampi	1
Las Piñas	12	Lakas	11
Las Piñas	12	Independent	1
Lucena	10	Kampi	7
Lucena	10	Liberal	3
Makati	16	PDP–Laban	11
Makati	16	LDP	1
Makati	16	Liberal	1
Makati	16	NPC	1
Makati	16	Independent	2
Malabon	12	Liberal	5
Malabon	12	NPC	4
Malabon	12	LDP	2
Malabon	12	Lakas	1
Mandaluyong	12	Lakas	11
Mandaluyong	12	Independent	1
Mandaue	10	Lakas/Kampi	8
Mandaue	10	PDSP	2
Manila	36	Liberal	23
Manila	36	PDP–Laban	4
Manila	36	Lakas	3
Manila	36	Aksyon	2
Manila	36	Kampi	1
Manila	36	Lakas/Liberal	1
Manila	36	Nacionalista	1
Manila	36	UNO	1
Marikina	16	Lakas	15
Marikina	16	PMP	1
Muntinlupa	16	Lakas	13
Muntinlupa	16	PMP/UNO	2
Muntinlupa	16	PMP	1
Naga	10	Liberal	9
Naga	10	Aksyon	1
Navotas	12	Navoteño	11
Navotas	12	Liberal	1
Olongapo	10	Lakas	8
Olongapo	10	Ang Kapatiran	1
Olongapo	10	NPC	1
Ormoc	10	Lakas	6
Ormoc	10	Kampi	4
Parañaque	16	Lakas	12
Parañaque	16	PMP/UNO	3
Parañaque	16	PMP	1
Pasay	12	UNO/LDP	7
Pasay	12	Kampi	4
Pasay	12	LDP/UNO	1
Pasig	12	Kampi	10
Pasig	12	Lakas	2
Pateros	12	PDP–Laban	6
Pateros	12	Lakas	6
Quezon City	24	Lakas	20
Quezon City	24	NPC/UNO	1
Quezon City	24	Independent	3
San Juan	12	PMP	10
San Juan	12	Independent	2
Santiago	10	Lakas	7
Santiago	10	Liberal	3
Taguig	16	KDT	14
Taguig	16	NPC	2
Valenzuela	12	NPC	5
Valenzuela	12	Lakas	4
Valenzuela	12	Liberal	3
Zamboanga City	16	LDP	12
Zamboanga City	16	Lakas	3
Zamboanga City	16	NPC	1
Source: Commission on Elections

== See also ==
- 14th Congress of the Philippines
