= Controversies in the 2010 Philippine general election =

Controversies abounded during the 2010 Philippine elections.

== Before election day ==
Five days before the elections, petitions were made to postpone the elections due to technical malfunctions with the electronic voting machines. On May 7, 2010, the Supreme Court rejected the petitions, affirming the vote would go ahead as planned.

== Election Day ==
=== Failure of elections ===
The Commission on Elections (COMELEC) declared failure of elections in seven municipalities in Lanao del Sur, two municipalities but with several barangays involved in Basilan and one municipality in Sarangani. While a postponement of elections was declared in one municipality of Iloilo and Samar due to accidental ballot-switching:

- Lanao del Sur
  - Sultan Dumalondong: for lack of Board of Election Inspectors (BEI)
  - Tubaran: for lack of Board of Election Inspectors (BEI)
  - Masiu: for lack of Board of Election Inspectors (BEI)
  - Lumba-Bayabao: for lack of functioning electronic voting machines.
  - Marogong: harassment of Board of Election Inspectors (BEI)
  - Lumbaca-Unayan: Objections of both parties on defective machines.
  - Bayang: Poll-related violence.
- Glan, Sarangani: special polls in barangay Poblacion.
- Al-Barka, Basilan: special polls in the barangays Danapah, Kailih, Bato-Bato, Apil-Apil, Bucalao, Sangkahan, Campug and Look Bisaya.
- Maluso, Basilan: special polls in barangays Upper and Lower Mahayahay.

As such, special elections are to be held in those areas on June 3, 2010, while the following areas the elections will be held on May 29, 2010.

- Guimbal, Iloilo: accidental ballot-switching.
- Pagsanghan, Samar: accidental ballot-switching.

=== Malfunctioning voting machines ===
Several electronic voting machines malfunctioned, with some refusing to accept ballot papers, while others bogged down. As a result of the delays, COMELEC has extended voting hours from 6:00 p.m. to 7:00 p.m.

=== Poll-related violence ===
A series of explosions in Marawi, a sports utility vehicle parked in front of an elementary school exploded, followed by a series of explosions in Mindanao State University. The military said that he groups responsible for the bombings are trying scaring voters to prevent them from casting their votes. Armed supporters of contending vice mayoralty candidates in Kabuntalan, Maguindanao figured in a clash near the polling center. Another shooting incident occurred near a police station in Sambulawan, Datu Salibo. In both instances, voting was temporarily suspended in the surrounding area.

In La Union, four were hurt when a homemade bomb exploded in a corridor of the Saint Nicholas Academy. Despite this, voting proceeded. Meanwhile, in Bacoor, Cavite, two were killed when they were shot while riding a van. Those who were killed might be supporters of Congressional candidate Plaridel Abaya, for the van they were riding sported his yellow stickers.

Despite the violence, the Armed Forces of the Philippines and the Philippine National Police commented that election day was "generally peaceful".

== After Election Day ==
=== Missing PCOS machines in Antipolo ===
On May 13, about 65 PCOS machines (counting machines) were found in a house in Antipolo, Rizal. A Smartmatic (the company contracted to supply the voting machines) technician brought the machines to his house after the commission refused to accept them. The machines are supposed to stay inside the polling precincts the day after the election before being shipped. The commission officer in Antipolo refused to accept the machines saying that after the transmission of votes, the machines were now not under his jurisdiction. This caused doubts on the election result of the Antipolo mayoralty election in which Congressman Angelito Gatlabayan was beaten by Nilo Leyble.

The machines were taken to the Ynares Center where losing presidential candidates John Carlos de los Reyes, Jamby Madrigal and Nicanor Perlas opened the machines, an act in which the commission described as "illegal" and said that they will press charges against the three. The machines were later transferred to the custody of the Senate President.
