= 2019–2021 polio outbreak in the Philippines =

Disease outbreak in the Philippines

- Map of provinces (including Metro Manila) with confirmed cases
- Disease: Polio
- Pathogen: Circulating vaccine–derived poliovirus type 1 (cVDPV1); Circulating vaccine–derived poliovirus type 2 (cVDPV2)
- Location: Philippines
- Index case: Marogong, Lanao del Sur
- Date: September 19, 2019 – June 11, 2021
- Confirmed cases: 17
- Deaths: 0
- Vaccinations: 4,750,000+ (2019 – August 2020)

The 2019–2021 polio outbreak in the Philippines was an epidemic. For the previous 19 years, the Philippines was free of any polio-related diseases. On September 14, 2019, the disease began to resurface through a positive test result done to a 3-year-old girl from Mindanao. After the confirmation of a second case from tests done on a 5-year-old boy, the government of the Philippines publicly declared a polio outbreak on September 19, 2019. On June 11, 2021, the WHO announced that the outbreak has ended.

According to the World Health Organization (WHO), the Philippines eradicated polio in 2000.

== Epidemiology ==
On September 19, 2019, a polio outbreak was reported in the Philippines. After two polio cases were reported, the authorities inspected several places including Metro Manila and Davao City. Samples taken from several places across Manila were confirmed to contain "vaccine-derived polio virus" type 2 (VDPV2), similar to the pathogen found on the first two confirmed cases. The government decided to vaccinate all the children regardless of whether they have been affected by polio or not. The Global Polio Eradication Initiative (GPEI) have worked with the government of the Philippines in a massive polio vaccination campaign; other NGOs like the Red Cross are also collaborating in the campaign as well.

Four cases have been confirmed as of November 5, 2019: the first was a three-year-old girl in Lanao del Sur with the other cases reported in Laguna, Maguindanao, and Sultan Kudarat. It is believed that the public's distrust in the country's poor healthcare system is a cause of the polio outbreak.

This is not the first disease outbreak in the Philippines in 2019. In February 2019, a measles outbreak occurred as a result of public distrust in the Philippines' poor healthcare system. As of January 2019, the Philippines has been combating a dengue outbreak, the worst dengue outbreak that the Philippines has experienced since 2012. Like the measles outbreak, the dengue outbreak was also caused by public distrust of the dengue vaccination campaign in 2012.

The World Health Organization and UNICEF Philippines, declared the official end of the polio outbreak on June 11, 2021, after the virus has not been detected in the past 16 months.

Summary of polio cases
Case no.	Date	Age	Gender	Notes	Ref.
1	September 19	3	Female	Index case involving a girl from Marogong, Lanao del Sur	
2	September 20	5	Male	From Laguna; immunocompromised	
3	October 28	4	Female	From Datu Piang, Maguindanao	
4	November 5	?	?	From an unspecified location in Mindanao	
5	November 20	2	Female	From Maguindanao	
6	November 20	1	Male	From Cotabato City	
7	November 20	4	Female	From Cotabato	
8	November 25	9	Female	From Basilan	
9–12	No data				
13	January 16, 2020	2	Male	From Maguindanao	
14	January 16, 2020	3	Male	From Maguindanao	
15	January 16, 2020	2	Male	From Sultan Kudarat	
16	January 16, 2020	3	Male	From Quezon City	
17	February 15, 2020	1	Male	From Cabanatuan, Nueva Ecija	

== Response ==
=== Domestic ===
During this epidemic, WHO, UNICEF and other private medical communities collaborated to help the Philippines Department of Health in conducting enormous vaccination runs throughout Metro Manila, Davao City, Marawi, and other major cities in the country. The campaign sought to end the rise of the deadly virus. According to the Philippine Red Cross, the duration of the mass vaccination run happened between October 14 and 27, 2019; the number of children they aimed to have vaccinated is 65,000 children.

As of October 2, 2019, the International Federation of Red Cross and Red Crescent Societies (IFRC) has pledged US$336,700 from it relief funds in efforts to eradicate polio from the Philippines.

=== International ===
The outbreak not only poses a risk to the citizens of the Philippines but also raises concerns among neighboring countries regarding the spread of the disease. The Embassy of the Republic of Indonesia to the Philippines has issued an advisory with the objective of containing the transmission of polio.
