= Lanao del Sur's 5th parliamentary district =

Parliamentary district for the Bangsamoro Parliament

- Constituency for the Bangsamoro Parliament
- Boundary of Lanao del Sur's 5th parliamentary district in Lanao del Sur
- Province: Lanao del Sur
- Population: 144,765 (2024)
- Electorate: 86,383 (2026)

Current constituency
- Member of Parliament: Arimao Asum (elect)
- Political party: SIAP

Lanao del Sur's 5th parliamentary district is the fifth of the nine parliamentary districts of the province of Lanao del Sur for the Bangsamoro Parliament. It is composed of the municipalities of Butig, Lumbaca-Unayan, Lumbatan, Lumbayanague, Marogong, Sultan Dumalondong, and Tubaran.

Arimao Asum of the SIAP Party is the member of Parliament-elect for the district following the inaugural 2026 Bangsamoro Parliament election. He will assume office on October 30, 2026.

== List of MPs representing the district ==
No.	Portrait	Member (Lifespan)	Term of office	Party	Parliament	Electoral history	Constituencies
1		Arimao Asum (born 1953)	Assuming office on October 30, 2026	SIAP	1st Parliament	Elected in 2026.	2026–present Butig, Lumbaca-Unayan, Lumbatan, Lumbayanague, Marogong, Sultan Dumalondong, Tubaran

== Election results ==
=== 2026 ===
2026 Bangsamoro Parliament election in Lanao del Sur
Party	Candidate	Votes	%
SIAP	Arimao Asum	43,761	58.24
UBJP	Khaledyassin Papandayan	30,128	40.10
Independent	Udtog Tago	1,244	1.66
Total votes		75,133	100.00
SIAP win (new seat)			
