= Lumbaca-Unayan =

Municipality in Lanao del Sur, Philippines

Lumbaca-Unayan Ingëd a Lumbaca-Unayan Bayan ng Lumbaca-Unayan بلدية لمباكا أونايان
- Municipality
- Municipality of Lumbaca-Unayan
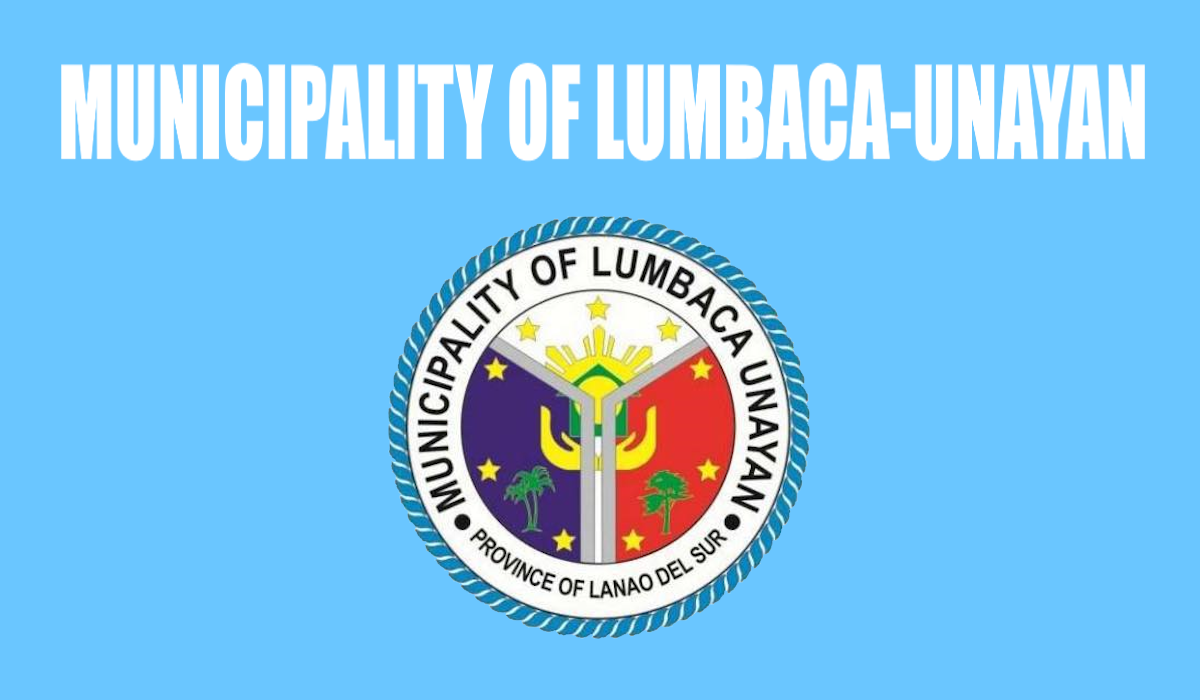
- Flag Seal

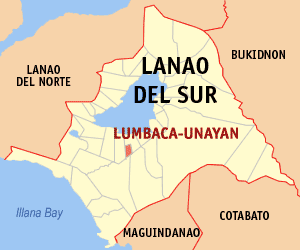
- Map of Lanao del Sur with Lumbaca-Unayan highlighted
- Interactive map of Lumbaca-Unayan
- Location within the Philippines
- Coordinates: 7°45′01″N 124°12′20″E
- Country: Philippines
- Region: Bangsamoro Autonomous Region in Muslim Mindanao
- Province: Lanao del Sur
- House district: 2nd district
- Parliamentary district: 5th district
- Founded: November 27, 2004
- Barangays: 9 (see Barangays)

Government
  - Type: Sangguniang Bayan
  - Mayor: Jamalia D. Aloyodan
  - Vice Mayor: Amer
  - House Representative: Yasser A. Balindong
  - Municipal Council: Members: Amer M. Aloyodan; Camaloden A. Awal; Khalil H. Abbas; Ansary B. Dimakuta; Abdulnaim A. Ariman; Laurente M. Espinosa; Haron L. Usman; Usman Panondi A. Abdulrahman
  - Electorate: 8,991 voters (2025)

Area
  - Total: 42.28 km^{2} (16.32 sq mi)
- Elevation: 772 m (2,533 ft)
- Highest elevation: 1,012 m (3,320 ft)
- Lowest elevation: 410 m (1,350 ft)

Population (2024 census)
  - Total: 8,768
  - Density: 207.4/km^{2} (537.1/sq mi)
  - Households: 1,236

Economy
  - Income class: 5th municipal income class
  - Poverty incidence: 29.68% (2023)
  - Revenue: ₱ 79.12 million (2024)
  - Assets: ₱ 145.2 million (2024)
  - Expenditure: ₱ 68.93 million (2024)
  - Liabilities: ₱ 56.49 million (2024)

Service provider
  - Electricity: Lanao del Sur Electric Cooperative (LASURECO)
- Time zone: UTC+8 (PST)
- ZIP code: 9707
- PSGC: 1903641000
- IDD : area code: +63 (0)63
- Native languages: Maranao; Tagalog
- Major religions: Islam

Lumbaca-Unayan, officially the Municipality of Lumbaca-Unayan (Maranao: Inged a Lumbaca-Unayan; Tagalog: Bayan ng Lumbaca-Unayan; Arabic (Kirim): لمباكا أونايان), is a municipality in the province of Lanao del Sur, Philippines. According to the 2024 census, it has a population of 8,768 people, making it the least populated municipality in the province.

Through the Muslim Mindanao Autonomy Act No. 106, signed by Nur Misuari on November 22, 2000, the new municipality was created from Lumbatan. A positive affirmation was given in a plebiscite on November 27, 2004.

== Geography ==
Lumbaca-Unayan borders the town of Lumbatan in the north and east, Bayang in the west, and Marogong and Sultan Dumalondong in the south.

=== Barangays ===
Lumbaca-Unayan is politically subdivided into 9 barangays. Each barangay consists of puroks while some have sitios.

- Bangon
- Beta Proper
- Calalon (formerly Ka-alawan)
- Calipapa
- Dilausan
- Dimapaok
- Lumbaca-Dilausan
- Oriental Beta
- Tringun

=== Climate ===
Climate data for Lumbaca-Unayan, Lanao del Sur
Month	Jan	Feb	Mar	Apr	May	Jun	Jul	Aug	Sep	Oct	Nov	Dec	Year
Mean daily maximum °C (°F)	25 (77)	25 (77)	26 (79)	26 (79)	25 (77)	24 (75)	24 (75)	24 (75)	25 (77)	25 (77)	25 (77)	25 (77)	25 (77)
Mean daily minimum °C (°F)	19 (66)	19 (66)	20 (68)	20 (68)	21 (70)	20 (68)	20 (68)	20 (68)	20 (68)	20 (68)	20 (68)	19 (66)	20 (68)
Average precipitation mm (inches)	236 (9.3)	225 (8.9)	244 (9.6)	235 (9.3)	304 (12.0)	287 (11.3)	200 (7.9)	175 (6.9)	158 (6.2)	200 (7.9)	287 (11.3)	243 (9.6)	2,794 (110.2)
Average rainy days	24.3	22.3	26.0	27.2	28.3	27.2	25.8	24.8	22.2	25.4	27.2	25.8	306.5
Source: Meteoblue (modeled/calculated data, not measured locally)

== History ==
In 2004, nine barangays of Pat ka Apo sa Macadar in Lumbatan were made into Lumbaca-Unayan, a separate municipality among nine Princess of Unayan (e.g.in Meranau terms: 1. Andong sa Macadar 2. Ungklan sa Bita,3. Sana Lumbayanague, 4. Uyoda sa Madamba, 5. Inoda sa Ganassi, 6. Ayor sa Linindingan, 7. inkini sa Tubaran, 8.Togon sa Kadinguilan, 9. Dadauba sa Biabi 10. Borowa Pagayawan).

== Demographics ==
Population census of Lumbaca-Unayan
Year	Pop.	±% p.a.
2007	11,766	—
2010	6,279	−20.43%
2015	7,260	+2.80%
2020	8,131	+2.41%
2024	8,768	+1.83%
Source: Philippine Statistics Authority

== Economy ==
Poverty Incidence of Lumbaca-Unayan

Source: Philippine Statistics Authority
