= Lumbatan =

Municipality in Lanao del Sur, Philippines

Lumbatan لومباتان
- Municipality
- Municipality of Lumbatan
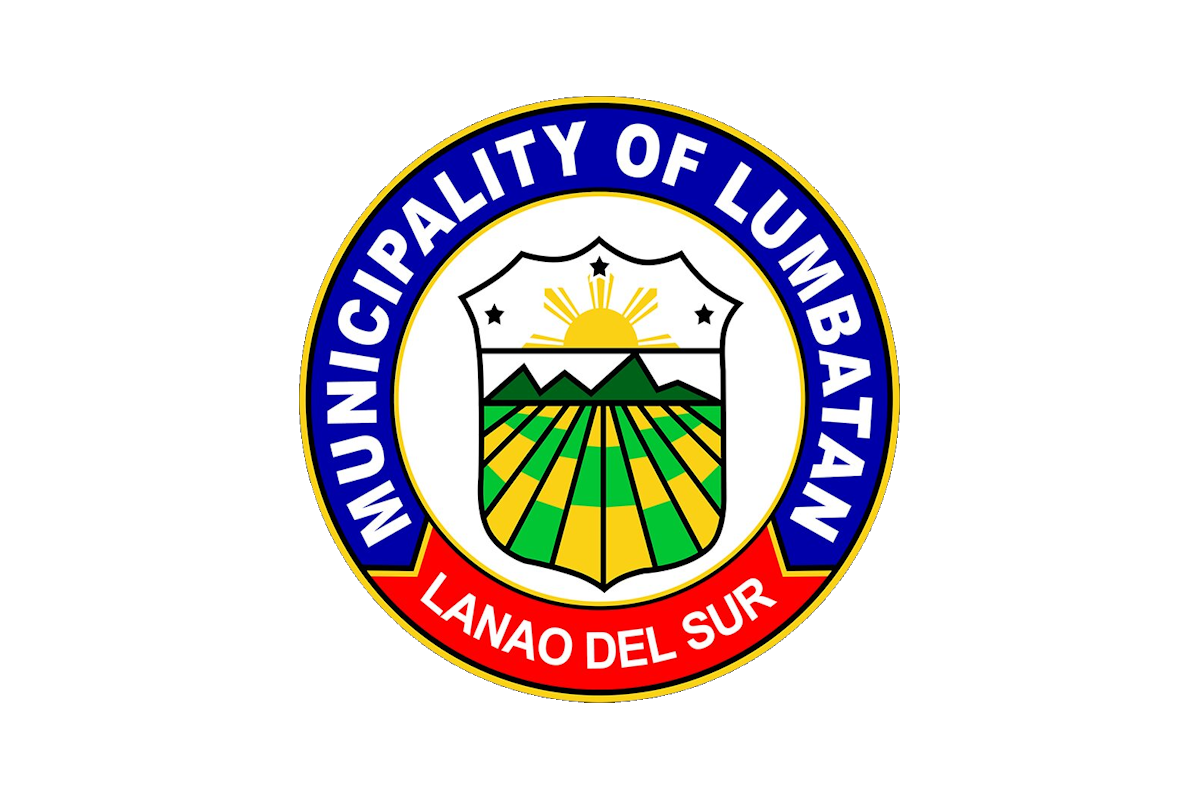
- Flag Seal

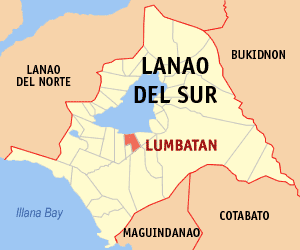
- Map of Lanao del Sur with Lumbatan highlighted
- Interactive map of Lumbatan
- Location within the Philippines
- Coordinates: 7°47′06″N 124°15′22″E
- Country: Philippines
- Region: Bangsamoro Autonomous Region in Muslim Mindanao
- Province: Lanao del Sur
- House district: 2nd district
- Parliamentary district: 5th district
- Barangays: 21 (see Barangays)

Government
  - Type: Sangguniang Bayan
  - Mayor: Allan "Bombi" I. Lao
  - Vice Mayor: Mohiddin C. Mua
  - House Representative: Yasser A. Balindong
  - Municipal Council: Members: Rowaida T. Benito; Johary U. Derico; Aslani M. Lao; Nairah K. Benito; Arsad R. Bosuk; Asimah G. Tamay; Casanoden G. Lao; Samad C. Lao
  - Electorate: 17,636 voters (2025)

Area
  - Total: 158.39 km^{2} (61.15 sq mi)
- Elevation: 751 m (2,464 ft)
- Highest elevation: 919 m (3,015 ft)
- Lowest elevation: 696 m (2,283 ft)

Population (2024 census)
  - Total: 24,988
  - Density: 157.76/km^{2} (408.60/sq mi)
  - Households: 3,474

Economy
  - Income class: 4th municipal income class
  - Poverty incidence: 23.09% (2023)
  - Revenue: ₱ 133.2 million (2024)
  - Assets: ₱ 213.3 million (2024)
  - Expenditure: ₱ 114.7 million (2024)
  - Liabilities: ₱ 87.56 million (2024)

Service provider
  - Electricity: Lanao del Sur Electric Cooperative (LASURECO)
- Time zone: UTC+8 (PST)
- ZIP code: 9307
- PSGC: 1903612000
- IDD : area code: +63 (0)63
- Native languages: Maranao; Tagalog
- Sulutan sa Macadar: Dr. Gamal Grande Mamacotao
- Website: www.lumbatan-lds.gov.ph

Lumbatan, officially the Municipality of Lumbatan (Maranao: Inged a Lumbatan; Tagalog: Bayan ng Lumbatan), is a municipality in the province of Lanao del Sur, Philippines. According to the 2024 census, it has a population of 24,988 people.

== History ==
In 2004, nine barangays of Lumbatan were made into Lumbaca-Unayan, a separate municipality.

Barangay Ligue was created out of barangay Pantar in pursuant to Muslim Mindanao Autonomy Act No. 79 dated 27 October 1998, which was ratified through a plebiscite conducted by the COMELEC on March 25, 2006.

== Geography ==
Lumbatan borders the town of Bayang in the east, Lumbaca-Unayan in the south and east, Sultan Dumalondong in the south, Lumbayanague in the east, Butig in a small point in the southwest, and Lake Lanao in the north.

=== Barangays ===
Lumbatan is politically subdivided into 21 barangays. Each barangay consists of puroks while some have sitios.

- Alog
- Gandamatu
- Bayasungen (Raya Macadar)
- Buad
- Budi
- Dago-ok
- Dalama
- Dalipuga
- Lalapung
- Lumbac (Talbo)
- Lumbac Bacayawan (Tomarumpong Macadar / Aman village)
- Lunay
- Sugoda Tambac
- Macadar (Poblacion).
- Madaya (Tambac), poblacion, (Sulayman Village).
- Maniokod
- Minanga Macadar
- Pantar
- Picotaan
- Poblacion (Lumbatan)
- Tambac Oriental
- Tambac Occidental
- Bubong Macadar
- Penaring (Lilod a Macadar)
- Ligue

=== Climate ===
Climate data for Lumbatan, Lanao del Sur
Month	Jan	Feb	Mar	Apr	May	Jun	Jul	Aug	Sep	Oct	Nov	Dec	Year
Mean daily maximum °C (°F)	25 (77)	26 (79)	26 (79)	26 (79)	26 (79)	25 (77)	25 (77)	25 (77)	25 (77)	25 (77)	25 (77)	26 (79)	25 (78)
Mean daily minimum °C (°F)	19 (66)	20 (68)	20 (68)	21 (70)	21 (70)	21 (70)	20 (68)	20 (68)	20 (68)	20 (68)	20 (68)	21 (70)	20 (69)
Average precipitation mm (inches)	236 (9.3)	225 (8.9)	244 (9.6)	235 (9.3)	304 (12.0)	287 (11.3)	200 (7.9)	175 (6.9)	158 (6.2)	200 (7.9)	287 (11.3)	243 (9.6)	2,794 (110.2)
Average rainy days	24.3	22.3	26.0	27.2	28.3	27.2	25.8	24.8	22.2	25.4	27.2	25.8	306.5
Source: Meteoblue (modeled/calculated data, not measured locally)

== Demographics ==
Population census of Lumbatan
Year	Pop.	±% p.a.
1918	2,596	—
1939	7,961	+5.48%
1948	9,284	+1.72%
1960	18,006	+5.67%
1970	17,790	−0.12%
1975	19,285	+1.63%
1980	8,750	−14.61%
1990	14,765	+5.37%
1995	15,505	+0.92%
2000	17,445	+2.56%
2007	24,036	+4.52%
2010	16,719	−12.37%
2015	19,105	+2.57%
2020	22,780	+3.77%
2024	24,988	+2.25%
Source: Philippine Statistics Authority

== Economy ==
Poverty Incidence of Lumbatan

Source: Philippine Statistics Authority
