= Niel Tupas =

Niel Tupas may refer to:

- Niel Tupas Sr. (1932–2015), governor of Iloilo
- Niel Tupas Jr. (born 1970), representative from Iloilo, son of Niel Tupas, Sr.
