= Sultan Dumalondong =

Municipality in Lanao del Sur, Philippines

Sultan Dumalondong سلطان دومالوندونغ
- Municipality
- Municipality of Sultan Dumalondong
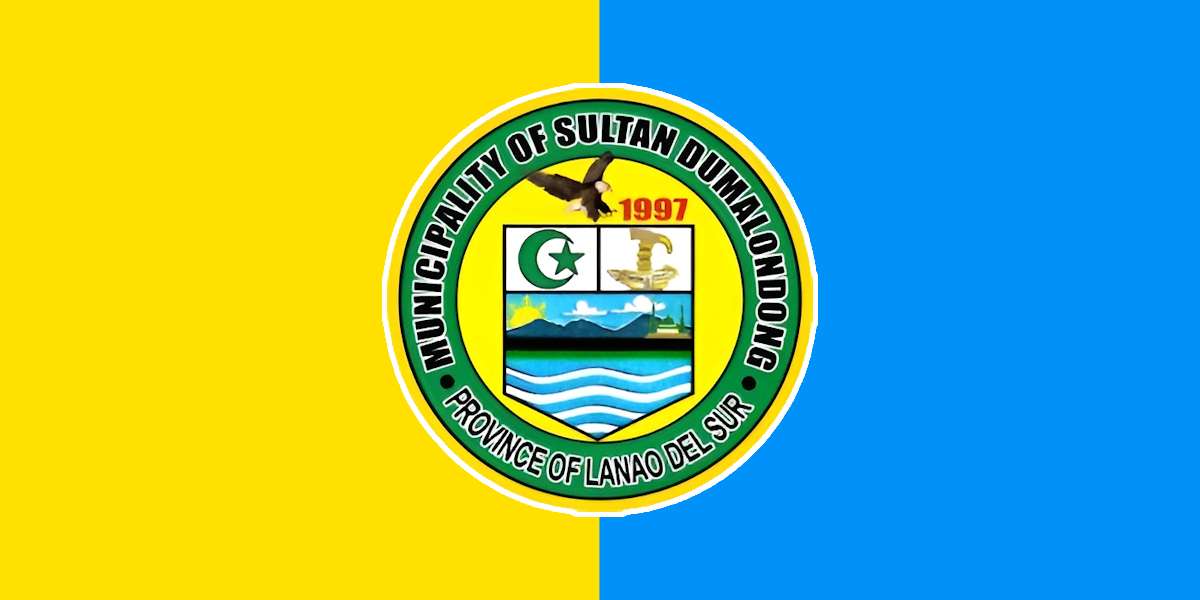
- Flag Seal

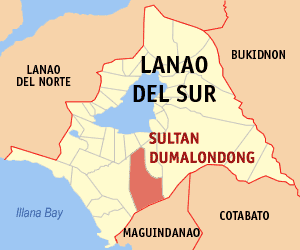
- Map of Lanao del Sur with Sultan Dumalondong highlighted
- Interactive map of Sultan Dumalondong
- Location within the Philippines
- Coordinates: 7°45′48″N 124°15′13″E
- Country: Philippines
- Region: Bangsamoro Autonomous Region in Muslim Mindanao
- Province: Lanao del Sur
- House district: 2nd district
- Parliamentary district: 5th district
- Founded: February 15, 1997
- Barangays: 7 (see Barangays)

Government
  - Type: Sangguniang Bayan
  - Mayor: Ben Jamel Asum Kurangking
  - Vice Mayor: Alibasa Cate Kurangking
  - House Representative: Yasser Alonto Balindong
  - Municipal Council: Members: Saadia Galo Lampaco; Macaraya Ramal Panandigan; Sebedin Langi Umpara; Hanif M.Isa macaindig; Saidana K. Hanirah; Jalil Awal Panandigan; Padol Samad Baraontong; Saadoden K. Ibrahim Palawan
  - Electorate: 6,651 voters (2025)

Area
  - Total: 275.80 km^{2} (106.49 sq mi)
- Elevation: 772 m (2,533 ft)
- Highest elevation: 919 m (3,015 ft)
- Lowest elevation: 667 m (2,188 ft)

Population (2024 census)
  - Total: 12,984
  - Density: 47.078/km^{2} (121.93/sq mi)
  - Households: 1,789

Economy
  - Income class: 5th municipal income class
  - Poverty incidence: 33.4% (2023)
  - Revenue: ₱ 146.5 million (2024)
  - Assets: ₱ 105.9 million (2024)
  - Expenditure: ₱ 137 million (2024)
  - Liabilities: ₱ 0.5213 million (2024)

Service provider
  - Electricity: Lanao del Sur Electric Cooperative (LASURECO)
- Time zone: UTC+8 (PST)
- ZIP code: 9706
- PSGC: 1903640000
- IDD : area code: +63 (0)63
- Native languages: Maranao; Tagalog
- Website: www.sultandumalondong-lds.gov.ph

Sultan Dumalondong, officially the Municipality of Sultan Dumalondong (Maranao: Inged a Sultan Dumalondong; Tagalog: Bayan ng Sultan Dumalondong), is a municipality in the province of Lanao del Sur, Philippines. According to the 2024 census, it has a population of 12,984 people.

It was created under Muslim Mindanao Autonomy Act No. 36 in 1995. It took 3 barangays and 6 sitios from Butig, 1 barangay and 9 sitios in Lumbatan, 9 barangays and 8 sitios in Lumbayanague.

== Geography ==
=== Barangays ===
Sultan Dumalondong is politically subdivided into 7 barangays. Each barangay consists of puroks while some have sitios.

- Bacayawan
- Dinganun Guilopa (Dingunun)
- Lumbac
- Malalis
- Pagalongan
- Tagoranao
- Sumalindao

=== Climate ===
Climate data for Sultan Dumalondong, Lanao del Sur
Month	Jan	Feb	Mar	Apr	May	Jun	Jul	Aug	Sep	Oct	Nov	Dec	Year
Mean daily maximum °C (°F)	25 (77)	25 (77)	26 (79)	26 (79)	25 (77)	24 (75)	24 (75)	24 (75)	25 (77)	25 (77)	25 (77)	25 (77)	25 (77)
Mean daily minimum °C (°F)	19 (66)	19 (66)	20 (68)	20 (68)	21 (70)	20 (68)	20 (68)	20 (68)	20 (68)	20 (68)	20 (68)	19 (66)	20 (68)
Average precipitation mm (inches)	236 (9.3)	225 (8.9)	244 (9.6)	235 (9.3)	304 (12.0)	287 (11.3)	200 (7.9)	175 (6.9)	158 (6.2)	200 (7.9)	287 (11.3)	243 (9.6)	2,794 (110.2)
Average rainy days	24.3	22.3	26.0	27.2	28.3	27.2	25.8	24.8	22.2	25.4	27.2	25.8	306.5
Source: Meteoblue (modeled/calculated data, not measured locally)

== Demographics ==
Population census of Sultan Dumalondong
Year	Pop.	±% p.a.
2000	11,105	—
2007	16,693	+5.78%
2010	10,522	−15.46%
2015	11,298	+1.36%
2020	12,500	+2.15%
2024	12,984	+0.92%
Source: Philippine Statistics Authority

== Economy ==
Poverty Incidence of Sultan Dumalondong

Source: Philippine Statistics Authority
