= Tubaran =

Municipality in Lanao del Sur, Philippines

Tubaran توباران
- Municipality
- Municipality of Tubaran
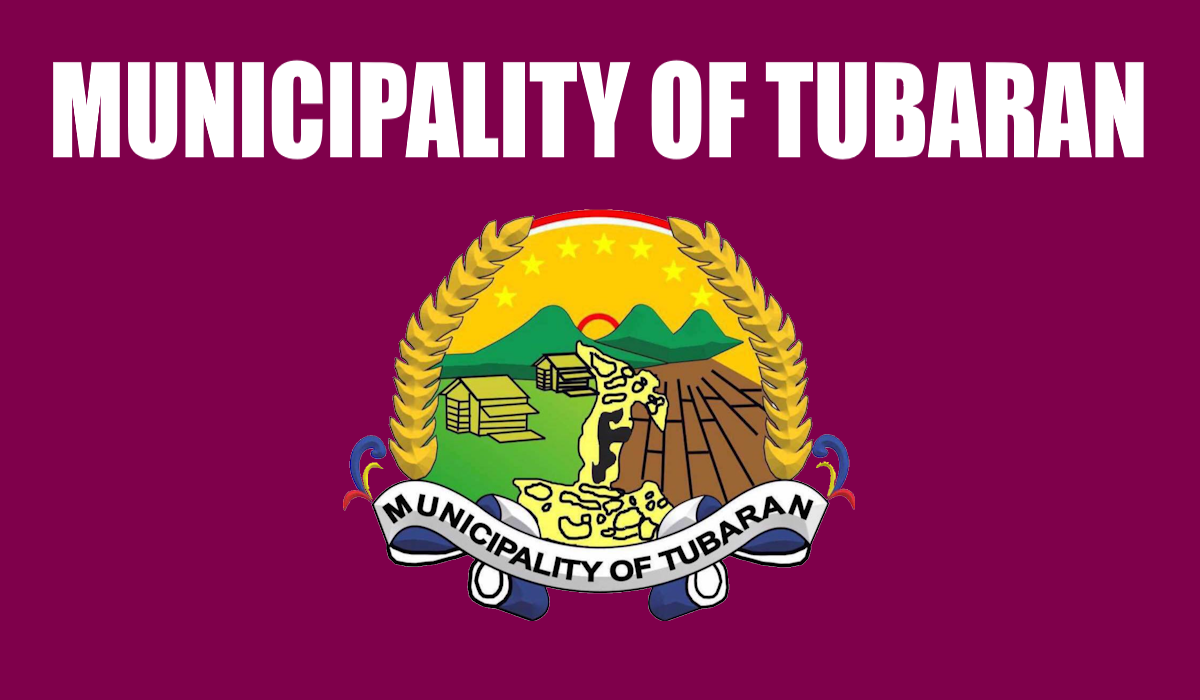
- Flag Seal

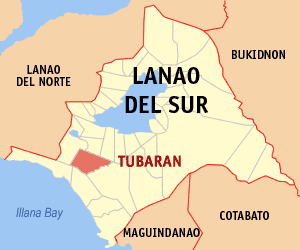
- Map of Lanao del Sur with Tubaran highlighted
- Interactive map of Tubaran
- Location within the Philippines
- Coordinates: 7°44′53″N 124°11′03″E
- Country: Philippines
- Region: Bangsamoro Autonomous Region in Muslim Mindanao
- Province: Lanao del Sur
- House district: 2nd district
- Parliamentary district: 5th district
- Barangays: 21 (see Barangays)

Government
  - Type: Sangguniang Bayan
  - Mayor: Khaledyassin D. Papandayan
  - Vice Mayor: Tongco Acsara Modiaba
  - House Representative: Yasser A. Balindong
  - Municipal Council: Members: Hadji Jamal S. Macasag; Mangontawar C. Ayaon; Alibsar S. Dimasangkay; Omair B. Amigos; Abulkhair A. Datumanong; Mama M. Abdulfatah; Saadoden B. Abdul Amer; H. Haron A. Osio
  - Electorate: 12,671 voters (2025)

Area
  - Total: 435.00 km^{2} (167.95 sq mi)
- Elevation: 274 m (899 ft)
- Highest elevation: 610 m (2,000 ft)
- Lowest elevation: 6 m (20 ft)

Population (2024 census)
  - Total: 17,567
  - Density: 40.384/km^{2} (104.59/sq mi)
  - Households: 2,658

Economy
  - Income class: 2nd municipal income class
  - Poverty incidence: 23.23% (2023)
  - Revenue: ₱ 225.1 million (2024)
  - Assets: ₱ 302 million (2024)
  - Expenditure: ₱ 181.7 million (2024)
  - Liabilities: ₱ 142.9 million (2024)

Service provider
  - Electricity: Lanao del Sur Electric Cooperative (LASURECO)
- Time zone: UTC+8 (PST)
- ZIP code: 9304
- PSGC: 1903628000
- IDD : area code: +63 (0)63
- Native languages: Maranao; Tagalog
- Website: www.tubaran-lds.gov.ph

Tubaran, officially the Municipality of Tubaran (Maranao: Inged a Tubaran; Tagalog: Bayan ng Tubaran), is a municipality in the province of Lanao del Sur, Philippines. According to the 2024 census, it has a population of 17,567 people.

== History ==
The name "Tubaran" came from one of the Nine Princess of Unayan (e.g. in Meranau term Andong so Macadar, etc.).

Before American colonization, Tubaran was formerly a part of the State of Unayan, Confederate States of Lanao based from ancient boundaries.

== Geography ==
=== Barangays ===
Tubaran is politically subdivided into 21 barangays. Each barangay consists of puroks while some have sitios.

- Alog
- Beta
- Poblacion (Buribid)
- Campo
- Datumanong
- Dinaigan
- Guiarong
- Mindamdag
- Paigoay-Pimbataan
- Polo
- Riantaran
- Tangcal
- Tubaran Proper
- Wago
- Bagiangun
- Gadongan
- Gaput
- Madaya
- Malaganding
- Matiticop
- Pagalamatan

=== Climate ===
Climate data for Tubaran, Lanao del Sur
Month	Jan	Feb	Mar	Apr	May	Jun	Jul	Aug	Sep	Oct	Nov	Dec	Year
Mean daily maximum °C (°F)	25 (77)	25 (77)	25 (77)	26 (79)	25 (77)	24 (75)	24 (75)	24 (75)	24 (75)	24 (75)	24 (75)	25 (77)	25 (76)
Mean daily minimum °C (°F)	19 (66)	19 (66)	19 (66)	20 (68)	20 (68)	20 (68)	19 (66)	19 (66)	19 (66)	19 (66)	20 (68)	19 (66)	19 (67)
Average precipitation mm (inches)	236 (9.3)	225 (8.9)	244 (9.6)	235 (9.3)	304 (12.0)	287 (11.3)	200 (7.9)	175 (6.9)	158 (6.2)	200 (7.9)	287 (11.3)	243 (9.6)	2,794 (110.2)
Average rainy days	24.3	22.3	26.0	27.2	28.3	27.2	25.8	24.8	22.2	25.4	27.2	25.8	306.5
Source: Meteoblue (modeled/calculated data, not measured locally)

== Demographics ==
Population census of Tubaran
Year	Pop.	±% p.a.
1918	946	—
1939	2,017	+3.67%
1948	8,332	+17.07%
1960	18,608	+6.92%
1970	18,994	+0.21%
1975	17,295	−1.86%
1980	7,499	−15.39%
1990	8,491	+1.25%
1995	9,617	+2.36%
2000	11,021	+2.96%
2007	20,358	+8.83%
2010	12,933	−15.22%
2015	14,749	+2.53%
2020	16,896	+2.90%
2024	17,567	+0.94%
Source: Philippine Statistics Authority

== Economy ==
Poverty Incidence of Tubaran

Source: Philippine Statistics Authority

== Notable personalities ==
- Datu Tampugaw, one of the sultans of the Confederate States of Lanao
