= Lumbayanague =

Municipality in Lanao del Sur, Philippines

Lumbayanague لومباياناغي
- Municipality
- Municipality of Lumbayanague
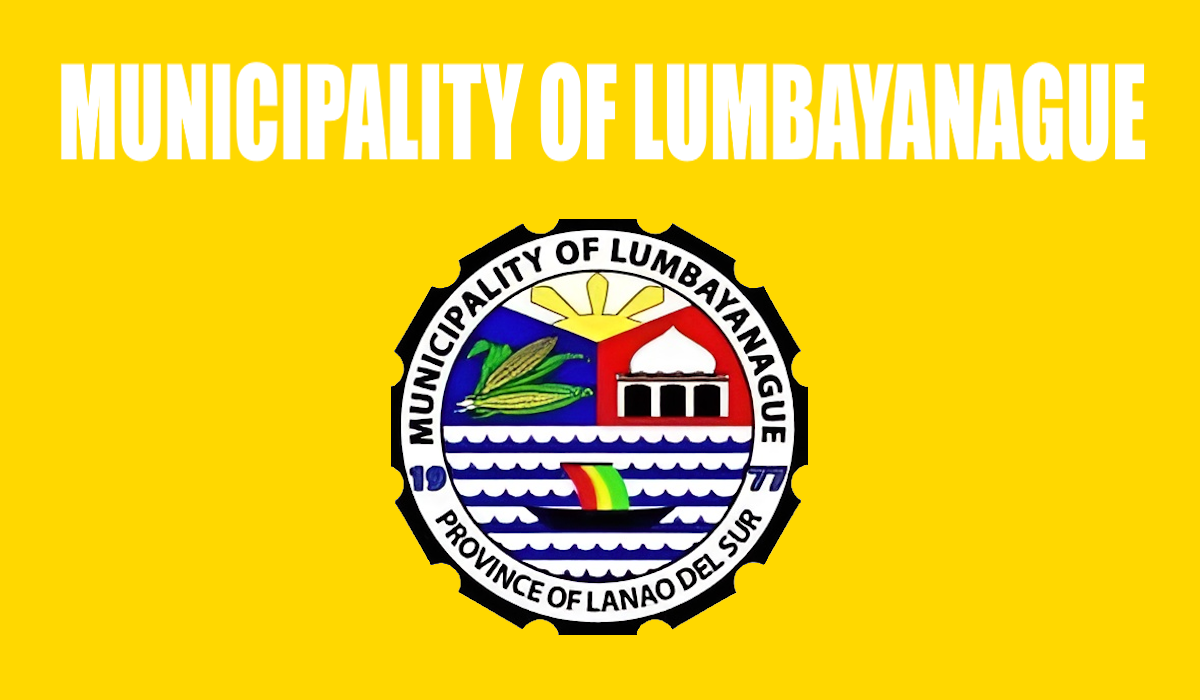
- Flag Seal

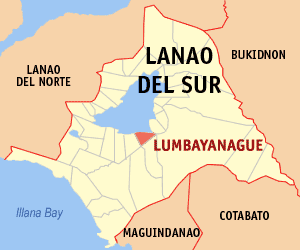
- Map of Lanao del Sur with Lumbayanague highlighted
- Interactive map of Lumbayanague
- Location within the Philippines
- Coordinates: 7°47′N 124°17′E
- Country: Philippines
- Region: Bangsamoro Autonomous Region in Muslim Mindanao
- Province: Lanao del Sur
- House district: 2nd district
- Parliamentary district: 5th district
- Barangays: 22 (see Barangays)

Government
  - Type: Sangguniang Bayan
  - Mayor: Salamona L. Asum
  - Vice Mayor: Arimao S. Asum
  - House Representative: Yasser A. Balindong
  - Municipal Council: Members: Nadia P. H.Gafor; Gamal P. Ali; Ansary A. Amerol; Aminoden M. Gunting; Almanar L. Macalandap; Saipoden N. Ampatua; Rasul M. Hadji Yasser; Linang C. Acmad
  - Electorate: 9,171 voters (2025)

Area
  - Total: 302.18 km^{2} (116.67 sq mi)
- Elevation: 749 m (2,457 ft)
- Highest elevation: 870 m (2,850 ft)
- Lowest elevation: 696 m (2,283 ft)

Population (2024 census)
  - Total: 21,469
  - Density: 71.047/km^{2} (184.01/sq mi)
  - Households: 3,048

Economy
  - Income class: 3rd municipal income class
  - Poverty incidence: 23.32% (2023)
  - Revenue: ₱ 191.7 million (2024)
  - Assets: ₱ 281.2 million (2024)
  - Expenditure: ₱ 158.3 million (2024)
  - Liabilities: ₱ 83.82 million (2024)

Service provider
  - Electricity: Lanao del Sur Electric Cooperative (LASURECO)
- Time zone: UTC+8 (PST)
- ZIP code: 9306
- PSGC: 1903636000
- IDD : area code: +63 (0)63
- Native languages: Maranao; Tagalog
- Website: www.lumbayanague-lds.gov.ph

Lumbayanague, officially the Municipality of Lumbayanague (Maranao: Inged a Lumbayanague; Tagalog: Bayan ng Lumabayanague), is a municipality in the province of Lanao del Sur, Philippines. According to the 2024 census, it has a population of 21,469 people.

== History ==
Lumbayanague among to the Nine Princess of Unayan (e.g. in Meranau term Sanaulan Dago-ok that means "Sana" Lumbayanague).

== Geography ==
=== Barangays ===
Lumbayanague is politically subdivided into 22 barangays. Each barangay consists of puroks while some have sitios.

- Bagoaingud
- Balaigay
- Bualan
- Cadingilan
- Casalayan
- Dala (Dalama)
- Dilimbayan
- Cabuntungan
- Lamin
- Diromoyod
- Kabasaran (Poblacion)
- Nanagun
- Mapantao-Balangas
- Miniros
- Pantaon
- Pindolonan
- Pitatanglan
- Poctan
- Singcara
- Wago
- Cadayonan
- Cadingilan A

=== Climate ===
Climate data for Lumbayanague, Lanao del Sur
Month	Jan	Feb	Mar	Apr	May	Jun	Jul	Aug	Sep	Oct	Nov	Dec	Year
Mean daily maximum °C (°F)	25 (77)	25 (77)	26 (79)	26 (79)	25 (77)	24 (75)	24 (75)	24 (75)	25 (77)	24 (75)	25 (77)	25 (77)	25 (77)
Mean daily minimum °C (°F)	19 (66)	19 (66)	19 (66)	20 (68)	21 (70)	20 (68)	20 (68)	20 (68)	20 (68)	20 (68)	20 (68)	19 (66)	20 (68)
Average precipitation mm (inches)	236 (9.3)	225 (8.9)	244 (9.6)	235 (9.3)	304 (12.0)	287 (11.3)	200 (7.9)	175 (6.9)	158 (6.2)	200 (7.9)	287 (11.3)	243 (9.6)	2,794 (110.2)
Average rainy days	24.3	22.3	26.0	27.2	28.3	27.2	25.8	24.8	22.2	25.4	27.2	25.8	306.5
Source: Meteoblue (modeled/calculated data, not measured locally)

== Demographics ==
Population census of Lumbayanague
Year	Pop.	±% p.a.
1980	4,304	—
1990	12,950	+11.65%
1995	13,888	+1.32%
2000	12,835	−1.68%
2007	21,717	+7.52%
2010	14,308	−14.09%
2015	16,372	+2.60%
2020	19,091	+3.29%
2024	21,469	+2.86%
Source: Philippine Statistics Authority

== Economy ==
Poverty Incidence of Lumbayanague

Source: Philippine Statistics Authority
