= Bayang =

Municipality in Lanao del Sur, Philippines

Bayang بايانج
- Municipality
- Municipality of Bayang
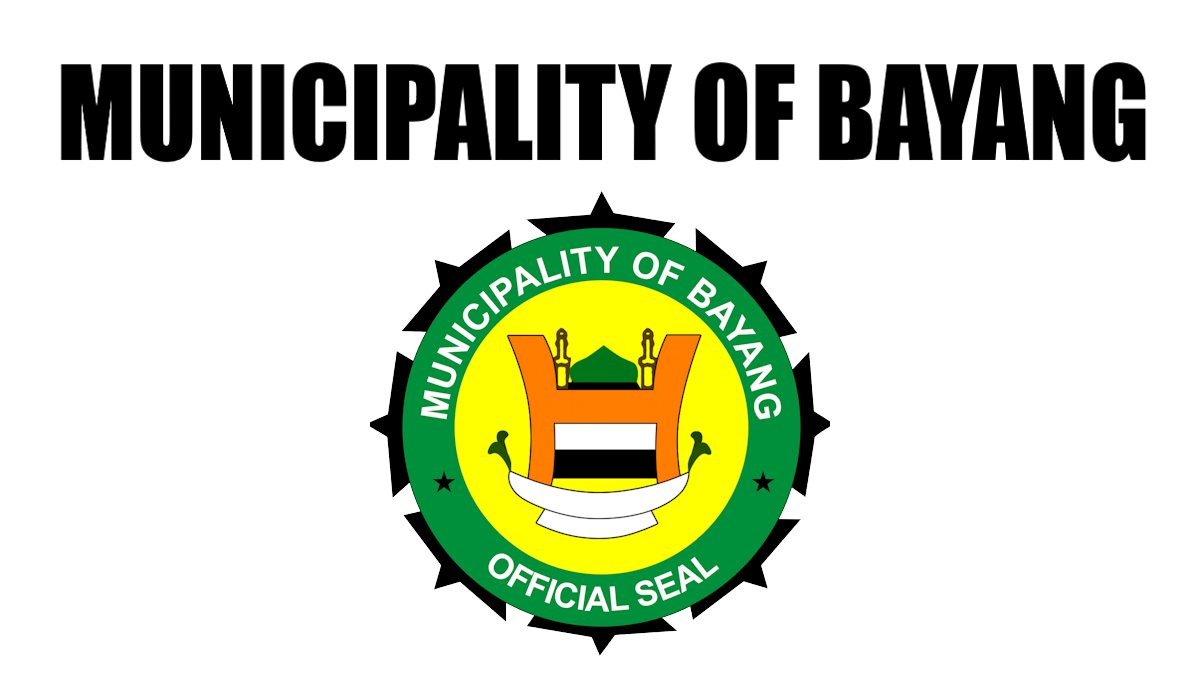
- Flag Seal

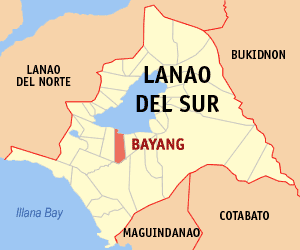
- Map of Lanao del Sur with Bayang highlighted
- Interactive map of Bayang
- Location within the Philippines
- Coordinates: 7°47′35″N 124°11′31″E
- Country: Philippines
- Region: Bangsamoro Autonomous Region in Muslim Mindanao
- Province: Lanao del Sur
- House district: 2nd district
- Parliamentary district: 6th district
- Chartered: June 25, 1962
- Founder: Imam Diwan
- Barangays: 49 (see Barangays)

Government
  - Type: Sangguniang Bayan
  - Mayor: Aslani P. Balt
  - Vice Mayor: Johanisah B. Radiamoda
  - House Representative: Yasser A. Balindong
  - Municipal Council: Members: Monib U. Abdallah; Araden H. Buleg; Monib G. Ampatua; Asnawi L. Pangonotan; Dicky D. Balt; Sobair C. Balt; Alnahar A. Bantuas; Naim R. Alimosa; Abdul Jamal Candu I.; Decampong; (Ex-Officio Member); Johairah D. Radiamoda; (Ex-Officio Member)
  - Electorate: 21,024 voters (2025)

Area
  - Total: 230.00 km^{2} (88.80 sq mi)
- Elevation: 780 m (2,560 ft)
- Highest elevation: 1,028 m (3,373 ft)
- Lowest elevation: 696 m (2,283 ft)

Population (2024 census)
  - Total: 30,227
  - Density: 131.42/km^{2} (340.38/sq mi)
  - Households: 4,085
- Demonym(s): iBayangen (people from Bayang); Moriatao Diwan (descendants of Diwan)

Economy
  - Income class: 3rd municipal income class
  - Poverty incidence: 22.7% (2023)
  - Revenue: ₱ 192.6 million (2024)
  - Assets: ₱ 248.5 million (2024)
  - Expenditure: ₱ 138.7 million (2024)
  - Liabilities: ₱ 38.98 million (2024)

Service provider
  - Electricity: Lanao del Sur Electric Cooperative (LASURECO)
  - Telecommunications: Smart Telecom, Globe Telecom
- Time zone: UTC+8 (PST)
- ZIP code: 9309
- PSGC: 1903604000
- IDD : area code: +63 (0)63
- Native languages: Maranao, Tagalog
- Major religions: Islam
- Website: www.bayang-lds.gov.ph

Bayang, officially the Municipality of Bayang (Maranao and Iranun: Inged a Bayang; Tagalog: Bayan ng Bayang; Arabic (Kirim): بايانج), is a municipality in the province of Lanao del Sur, Philippines. According to the 2024 census, it has a population of 30,227 people.

== Etymology ==
Bayang is one the 15 original royal sultanates of Lanao, most documented royal sultanate of West Unayan, founded by Imam Diwan of Unayan, when he chose lakeside for the religious purposes and called it "Bayang", a Malay term which means "shadow", Bayang is a reflection of his image as religious man.

Bayang is said to have been derived from the first word of the Philippine national anthem, our panditas (learned man) mentioned that Bayang is a Malay term of shadow or reflection, refers to our forefather "Diwan" which make people of Bayang identified as "Moriatao Diwan" (descendants of Diwan).

== History ==
In May 1902, during the Moro Rebellion (also known as the Moro–American War), Bayang was the site of a clash between Moro rebels and American troops that became known as the Battle of Bayang. The American troops, three infantry battalions and a battery of artillery total to some 1200 men, were led to Bayang by colonel Frank Baldwin to demand the extradition of the Moros responsible for the ambushing and killing of two American soldiers at the construction of a road from Iligan to Lake Lanao, two months earlier.

When the sultan of Bayang refused, Baldwin's troops attacked and captured the nearby cotta (fortress; "small, castle-like structures with thick, high walls") of Binidayan on 2 May. They subsequently attempted to capture the cotta of Pandapatan, which resisted the artillery fire and was only subdued the next day after hand-to-hand combat between Moros and Americans. The number of Moro casualties is estimated at 300 to 400, including the sultan of Bayang and his brother. On the American side, ten soldiers were killed and some forty wounded.

The cotta of Pandapatan has been preserved as a historical monument; the fallen of the Battle of Bayang are considered martyrs by Filipino Muslims.

== Geography ==
The Municipality of Bayang is located about 61 km. south of Marawi City. It has an area of 7,850 hectares. It lays 124’15’00 and about ‘45’00 latitude. It is bounded on the north and east by Lake Lanao, on the west by the municipality of Binidayan and on the south by the municipality of Lumbatan.

=== Topography ===
The topography of the municipality is generally characterized by moderately sloping lands. Approximately 2,606 hectares (63.45%) have moderate slopes of 8 – 15%. Steep lands with a slope 40 – 60% comprise 20.14% (827) ha. About 674 (16.41) have nearly level terrain.

The soil of the municipality is classified as Bayang silt loam Ruguan clay loam. Bayang silt loam covers an aggregate area of 3,446 ha. or 83.94% of the total land area. This is considered fertile which is good for diverse field crops like rice, corn, root crops, beans and cassava. The Ruguan clay loam comprise 16% (660 ha.)

The municipality is accessible by land and water transportations. Besides, only few barangays have roads. Other barangays cannot be reached by light vehicle due to impassable roads. Only heavy duty vehicles can be used to transport people and agricultural products.

=== Barangays ===
Bayang is politically subdivided into 49 barangays. Each barangay consists of puroks while some have sitios.

- Bagoaingud
- Bairan (Poblacion)
- Bandingun
- Biabi
- Bialaan
- Bubong Lilod
- Bubong Raya
- Cadayonan
- Cadingilan Occidental
- Cadingilan Oriental
- Condaraan Pob. (Condaraan Dimadap)
- Cormatan
- Gandamato
- Ilian
- Lalapung Central
- Lalapung Proper
- Lalapung Upper
- Linao
- Linuk (Poblacion)
- Liong
- Lumbac
- Lumbac Cadayonan
- Maliwanag
- Mapantao
- Mimbalawag
- Palao
- Pama-an
- Pamacotan
- Pantar
- Parao
- Patong
- Poblacion (Bayang)
- Porotan
- Rantian
- Raya Cadayonan
- Rinabor
- Samporna (Poblacion)
- Sapa
- Silid
- Sugod
- Sultan Pandapatan
- Sumbag (Poblacion)
- Tagoranao
- Tangcal
- Tangcal Proper
- Tomarompong
- Tomongcal Ligi
- Torogan
- Tuca (Poblacion)

=== Climate ===
Climate data for Bayang, Lanao de Sur
| Month | Jan | Feb | Mar | Apr | May | Jun | Jul | Aug | Sep | Oct | Nov | Dec | Year |
|---|---|---|---|---|---|---|---|---|---|---|---|---|---|
| Mean daily maximum °C (°F) | 25 (77) | 26 (79) | 26 (79) | 26 (79) | 26 (79) | 25 (77) | 25 (77) | 25 (77) | 25 (77) | 25 (77) | 25 (77) | 26 (79) | 25 (78) |
| Mean daily minimum °C (°F) | 19 (66) | 20 (68) | 20 (68) | 21 (70) | 21 (70) | 21 (70) | 20 (68) | 20 (68) | 20 (68) | 20 (68) | 20 (68) | 20 (68) | 20 (68) |
| Average precipitation mm (inches) | 236 (9.3) | 225 (8.9) | 244 (9.6) | 235 (9.3) | 304 (12.0) | 287 (11.3) | 200 (7.9) | 175 (6.9) | 158 (6.2) | 200 (7.9) | 287 (11.3) | 243 (9.6) | 2,794 (110.2) |
| Average rainy days | 24.3 | 22.3 | 26.0 | 27.2 | 28.3 | 27.2 | 25.8 | 24.8 | 22.2 | 25.4 | 27.2 | 25.8 | 306.5 |
Source: Meteoblue (modeled/calculated data, not measured locally)

The climate condition of Bayang falls under the fourth climate type of the corona system of the Philippine Climate Classification.

== Demographics ==
Population census of Bayang
| Year | Pop. | ±% p.a. |
|---|---|---|
| 1918 | 1,982 | — |
| 1939 | 4,480 | +3.96% |
| 1948 | 4,817 | +0.81% |
| 1960 | 24,315 | +14.44% |
| 1970 | 23,772 | −0.23% |
| 1975 | 19,455 | −3.94% |
| 1980 | 18,811 | −0.67% |
| 1990 | 18,928 | +0.06% |
| 1995 | 20,060 | +1.09% |
| 2000 | 21,020 | +1.01% |
| 2007 | 24,185 | +1.95% |
| 2010 | 21,472 | −4.24% |
| 2015 | 23,965 | +2.11% |
| 2020 | 28,023 | +3.35% |
| 2024 | 30,227 | +1.83% |
Source: Philippine Statistics Authority

=== Language ===
Maranao is the native language of Bayang. However, most of the inhabitants can speak Tagalog, Bisaya, Maguindanaon, Iranun and English.

=== Religion ===
Bayang, which has a predominantly Muslim population.

== Education ==
High school

- Mauyag C. Papandayan National High School, Rinabor, Bayang, Lanao del Sur
- Bayang National High School, Biabi, Bayang, Lanao del Sur
- Datu Mohammad Ali Cahar Memorial National High School, Linuk, Bayang, Lanao del Sur

== Economy ==
Poverty Incidence of Bayang

Source: Philippine Statistics Authority
