= Lanao del Sur =

Lanao del Sur لاناو الجنوبى
- Province
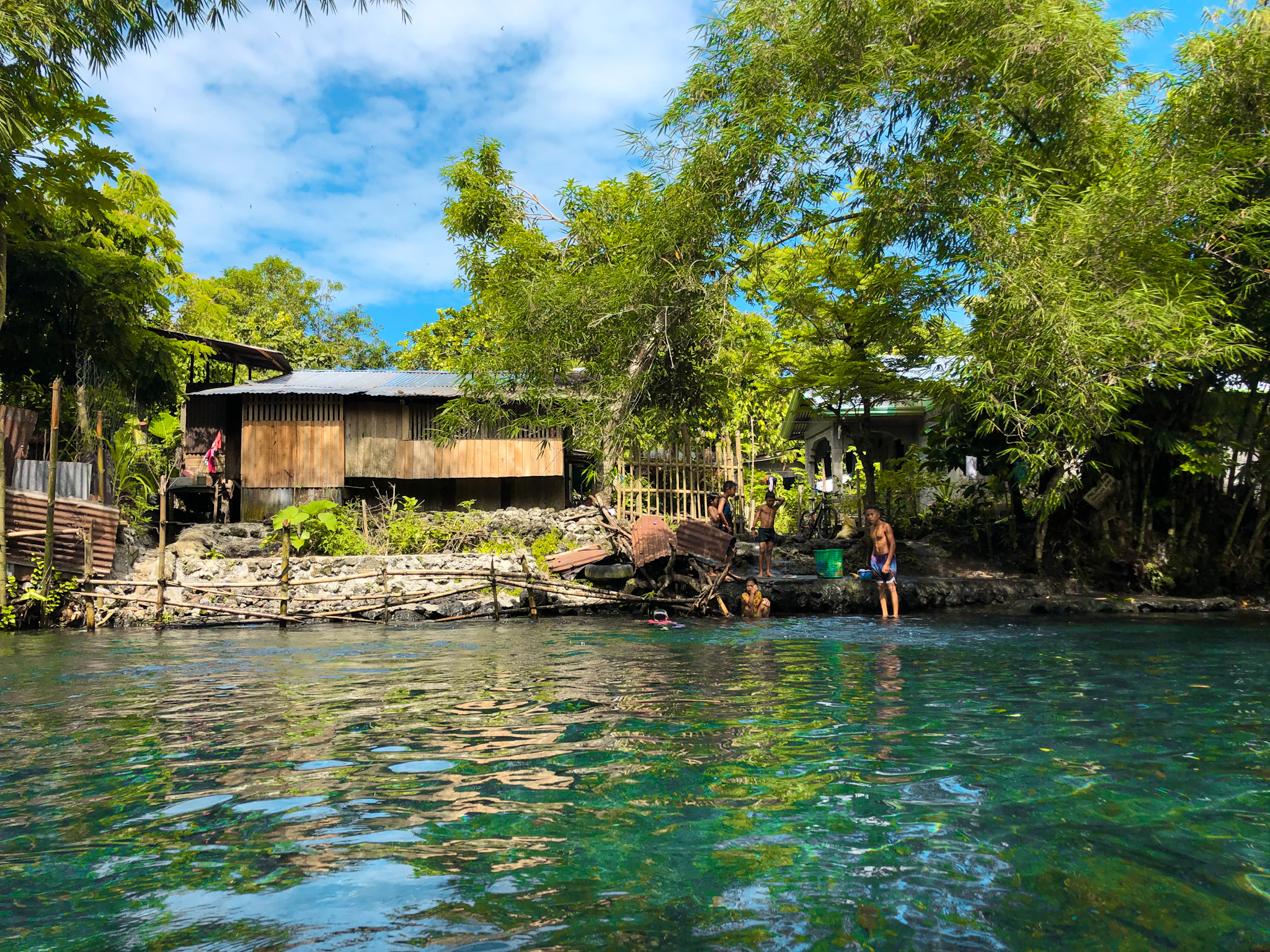
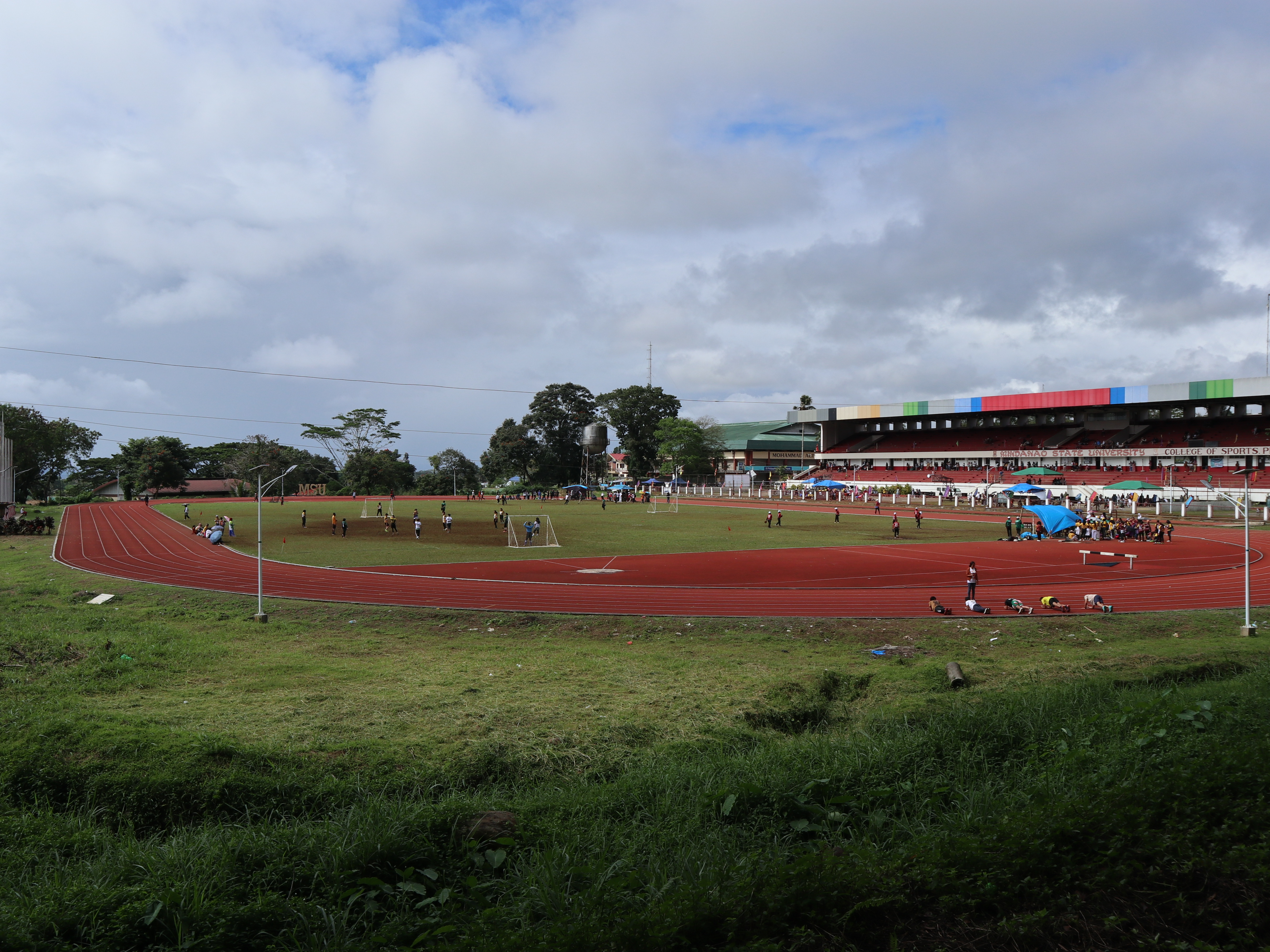
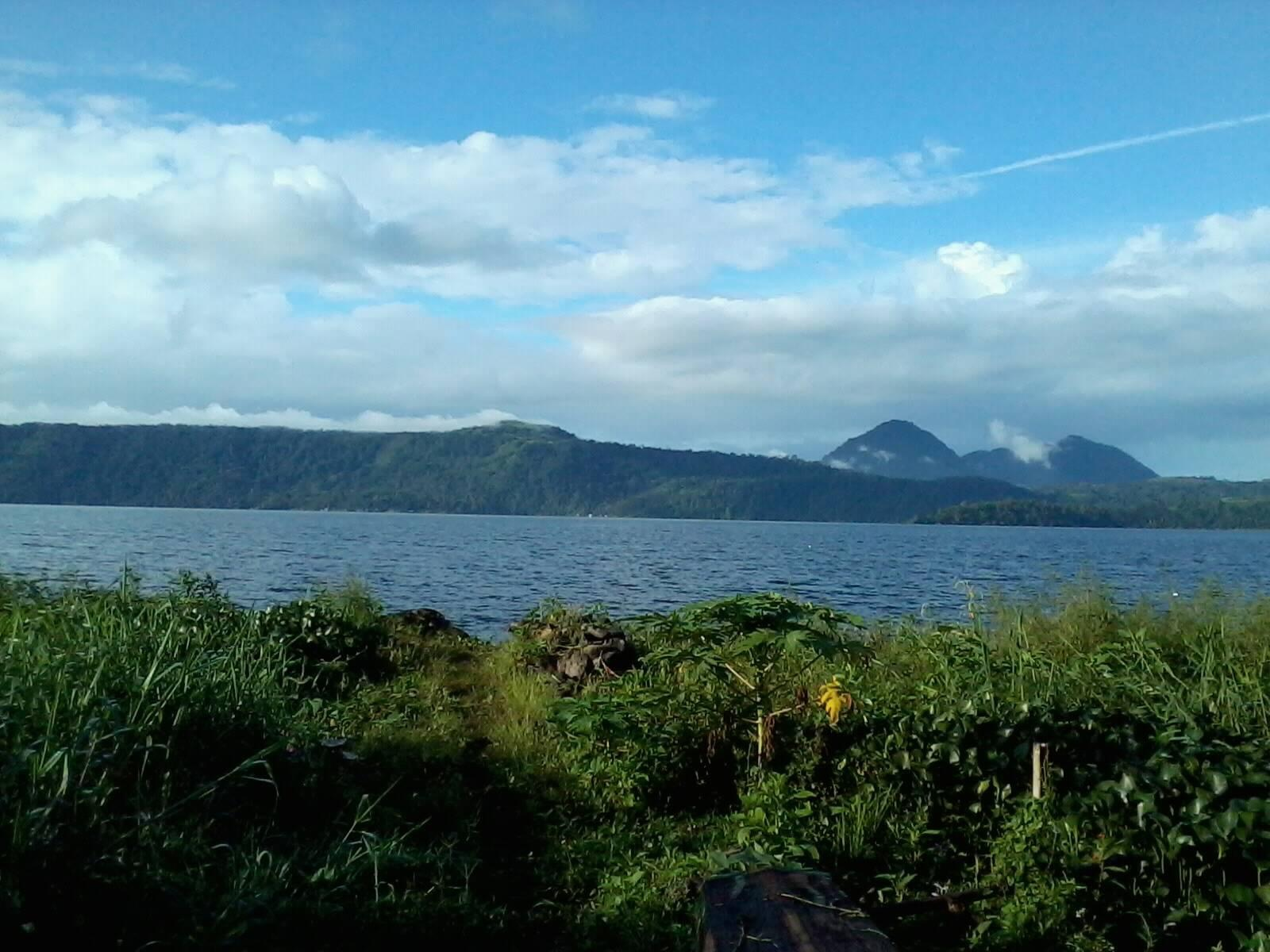
- from top: Balabagan spring, Mindanao State University stadium in Marawi, Lake Lanao

- Flag Seal
- Nickname: "Cradle of Muslim Art"
- Location in the Philippines
- Interactive map of Lanao del Sur
- Coordinates: 8°00′N 124°17′E
- Country: Philippines
- Region: Bangsamoro
- Founded: May 22, 1959
- Capital and largest city: Marawi

Government
  - Governor: Mamintal Adiong Jr. (Lakas–CMD)
  - Vice Governor: Mohammad Khalid R. Adiong (Lakas–CMD)
  - Legislature: Lanao del Sur Provincial Board
  - Electorate: 706,919 voters (2025)

Area
  - Total: 3,872.89 km^{2} (1,495.33 sq mi)
  - Rank: 33rd out of 82
- Highest elevation (Mount Ragang): 2,815 m (9,236 ft)

Population (2024 census)
  - Total: 1,368,137
  - Rank: 24th out of 82
  - Density: 353.260/km^{2} (914.939/sq mi)
  - Rank: 32nd out of 82
  - Households: 183,629
- Demonym: South Lanaonon

Divisions
  - Independent cities: 0
  - Component cities: 1: Marawi
  - Municipalities: 39: Amai Manabilang; Bacolod-Kalawi; Balabagan; Balindong; Bayang; Binidayan; Buadiposo-Buntong; Bubong; Butig; Calanogas; Ditsaan-Ramain; Ganassi; Kapai; Kapatagan; Lumba-Bayabao; Lumbaca-Unayan; Lumbatan; Lumbayanague; Madalum; Madamba; Maguing; Malabang; Marantao; Marogong; Masiu; Mulondo; Pagayawan; Piagapo; Picong; Poona Bayabao; Pualas; Saguiaran; Sultan Dumalondong; Tagoloan II; Tamparan; Taraka; Tubaran; Tugaya; Wao
  - Barangays: 1,159
  - Districts: Legislative districts of Lanao del Sur

Economy
  - Income class: 1st provincial income class
  - Poverty incidence: 12.1% (2023)
  - Revenue: ₱ 3,885 million (2024)
  - Assets: ₱ 11,045 million (2024)
  - Expenditure: ₱ 3,871 million (2024)
  - Liabilities: ₱ 3,758 million (2024)
- Time zone: UTC+8 (PHT)
- PSGC: 153600000
- IDD : area code: +63 (0)63
- ISO 3166 code: PH-LAS
- Spoken languages: Maranao; Iranun; Tagalog; English
- Website: https://lanaodelsur.gov.ph/

Lanao del Sur (Filipino: Timog Lanao; Meranaw and Iranun: Pagabagatan Ranao; Jawi (Batang Arab): لاناو الجنوبى), officially the Province of Lanao del Sur, is a province in the Philippines located in the Bangsamoro Autonomous Region in Muslim Mindanao (BARMM). The capital is the city of Marawi (the most populous in the province), and it borders Lanao del Norte to the north, Bukidnon to the east, and Maguindanao del Norte and Cotabato to the south. To the southwest lies Illana Bay, an arm of the Moro Gulf.

Situated in the interior of Lanao del Sur is Lake Lanao, the largest lake in Mindanao.

== Etymology ==
"Lanao" means "lake", derived from ranao. The province, situated at basin of Lake Lanao, is known as the land of the "Maranaos" (which means "the "people of the lake").

== History ==
=== Early history ===
Prior to the arrival of Islam, the region already had a sophisticated culture, as embodied in various Maranao epics, chants, and recorded history. The people of Lanao used to adhere to Hinduism, polytheist animism, and Buddhism. During this era, various cultural icons developed, such as the torogan, the singkil dance, the darangen epic, the unique Maranao gong and metal craft culture, the sarimanok, the okir motif, and an indigenous suyat script.

=== Spanish colonization ===
In April 1639, Spanish conquistador Sebastián Hurtado de Corcuera conducted an expedition near Lanao along with troops consisting of Christianized Filipinos. In 1640, the Spanish created a garrison near Lanao but was attacked by indigenous Maranaos. In 1689, the Spaniards discovered a settlement named Dansalan at Lake Lanao's northern end. Lanao was the seat of the Sultanate of Lanao.

During the Pre-Spanish time, there were 4 important boundaries which held the power of appointing a new sultan namely: Bakayawan, Dalama, Madamba and Sawer. In appointing a new sultan the permission of these four boundaries are needed to validate the new sultan appointed to his position.

=== Japanese occupation ===
In 1942, it was occupied by the Japanese Imperial Forces who landed in Southern Lanao. On May 2, 1942, the former Chief Justice of the Supreme Court of the Philippines José Abad Santos was killed by the Japanese Imperial forces in a firing squad at Malabang, Lanao del Sur. In 1945, the first of the liberation forces landed in Southern Lanao and liberated the area with United States, Philippine Commonwealth troops together with the Maranao guerrilla units. They used infantry weapons, the Maranao Kris, Barong and Kampilan swords against the Japanese forces in the Battle of Lanao.

=== Philippine independence ===
In 1956, Republic Act No. 1552 changed the name Dansalan to Marawi, taken from the word rawi, referring to the reclining lilies abundant in the Agus River.

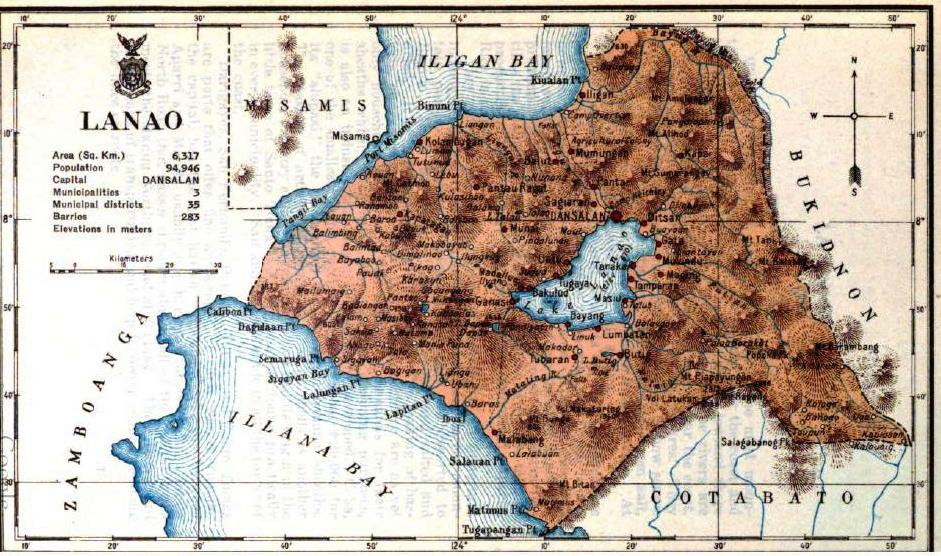
Lanao province map in 1918

==== Division ====
In 1959, Lanao was divided into two provinces, Lanao del Norte and Lanao del Sur, under Republic Act No. 2228. Marawi was designated as the capital of Lanao del Sur. The city was renamed the "Islamic City of Marawi" in 1980, and is currently the Philippines' only city having a predominantly Muslim population.

==== Proposed Maranaw province ====
In 1971, Republic Act No. 6406, which sought to create a new province out of eastern Lanao del Sur (now corresponding to the province's first congressional district), was approved on October 4, 1971. The province was to consist of the municipalities of Bubong, Ditsaan-Ramain (including what is now Buadiposo-Buntong), Kapai, Lumba-Bayabao (including what is now Maguing), Marantao, Masiu, Mulondo, Saguiaran, Piagapo, Poona Bayabao, Tamparan, Taraka and Wao (including what is now Bumbaran), with the chartered city of Marawi serving as the new provincial capital. The division never took place due to the declaration of Martial law in the Philippines on September 21, 1972, which disrupted the elections for 1973.

==== Inclusion to the ARMM ====
In a 1989 plebiscite, Lanao del Sur voted to join the Autonomous Region in Muslim Mindanao (ARMM), but the city of Marawi voted to remain outside the ARMM. It later joined ARMM in 2001 following the plebiscite that sought to expand the autonomous region.

=== Contemporary ===
The Battle of Marawi began and ended in 2017. The battle was against ISIL-affiliated militants, a number of which were Malaysian citizens. The battle destroyed most of the cityscape of Marawi and killed hundreds of civilians and Filipino soldiers.

A petition was released in support for the usage of the torogan as inspiration for the rehabilation of Marawi after the Battle of Marawi. The petition was released in opposition to the possible Manila Rehabilation Effect that the government plans to impose. The Manila-style rehabilation would establish shanty houses and buildings without Maranao architectural styles, thus destroying Marawi's Maranao cultural skyline. The petition advocates a Warsaw-style Rehabilation Effect, where the culture and styles of a particular area is used as foundation for rehabilitation of built heritage and landscape. Among the local architectural styles that may be used under the Warsaw-style are the okir, sarimanok, and inspirations from the torogan. The Warsaw-style is also foreseen to boost tourism in the city in the long-run due to the cultural aesthetics it would bring.

== Governors ==
- 1947-1949, Louis R. Marohombsar
- 1949-1953, Mandangan Dimakuta
- 1954-1955, Cosain Lucman
- 1955-1959, Salvador T. Lluch
- 1959-1967, Madki A. Alonto
- 1968-1971, Linang D. Mandangan
- 1972-1975, Princess Tarhata Alonto-Lucman
- 1975-1976, Mamarinta B. Lao
- 1976–1986, Mohammad Ali Dimaporo
- 1987–1992, Saidamen Balt Pangarungan
- 1992–2001, Mahid Miraato Mutilan
- 2001–2004, Mamintal Adiong Sr.
- 2004–2007, Basher Dimalaang Manalao
- 2007–2016, Mamintal Alonto Adiong Jr.
- 2016–2019, Soraya Alonto Adiong
- 2019–present, Mamintal Alonto Adiong Jr.

== Geography ==
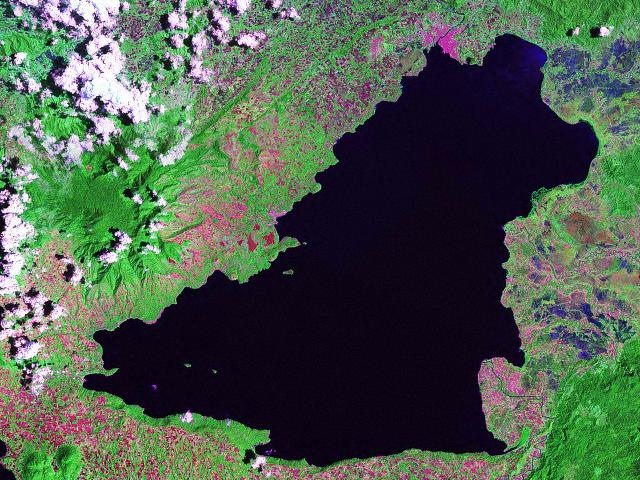
Satellite view of Lanao Lake, situated entirely within the province

Lanao del Sur is bounded on the north by Lanao del Norte, on the east by Bukidnon, on the west by Illana Bay, and on the south by Maguindanao del Norte and Cotabato. The landscape is dominated by rolling hills and valleys, placid lakes and rivers.

Located within the province is Lanao Lake, the second largest in the country, its waters drained by the Agus River which eventually empties into Iligan Bay.

The climate in the province is characterized by even distribution of rainfall throughout the year, without a distinct summer season. The province is located outside the typhoon belt.

=== Administrative divisions ===
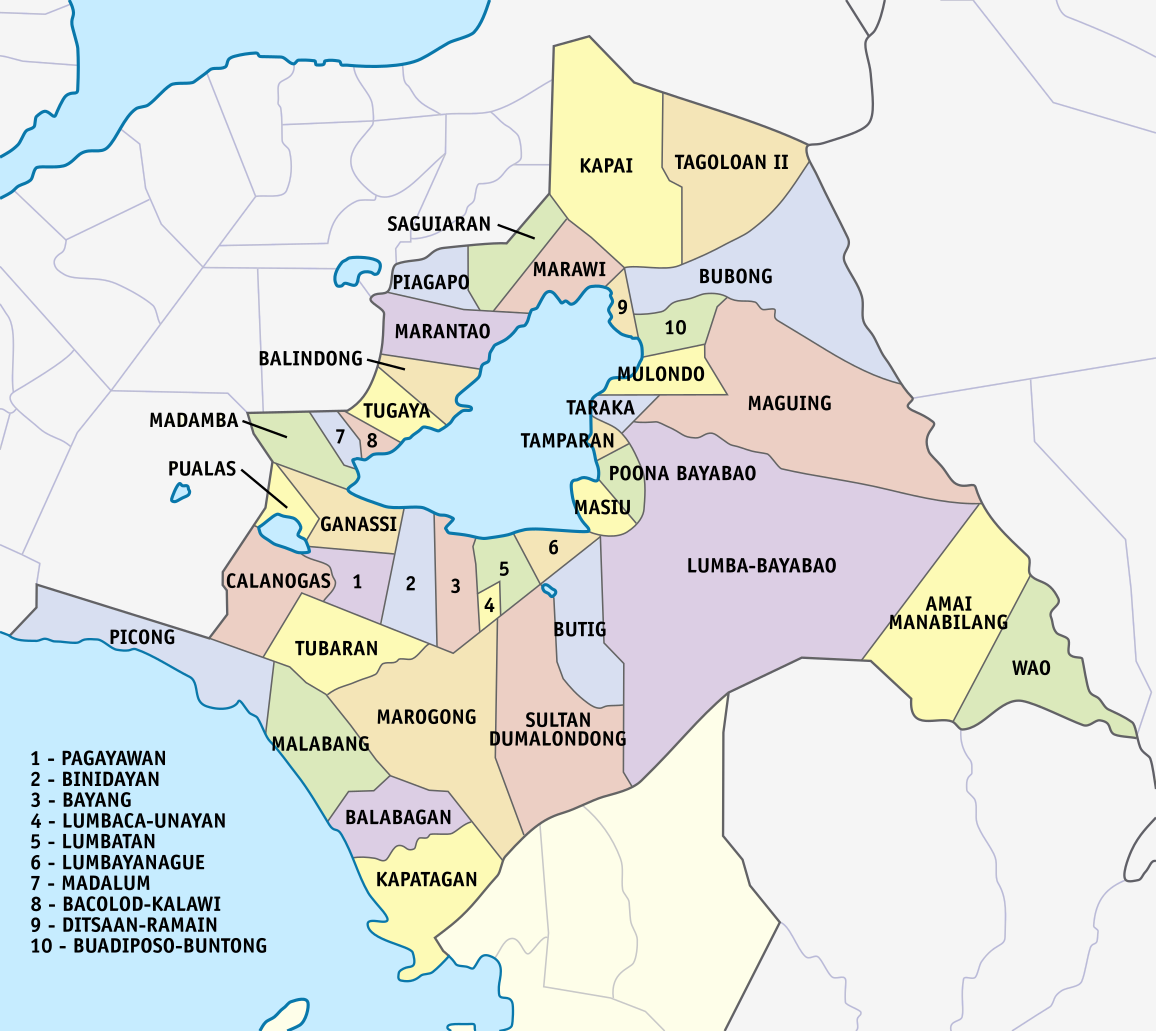
Political divisions of Lanao del Sur

Lanao del Sur comprises 39 municipalities and 1 city.

- † Provincial capital and component city
- Municipality

City or municipality^{[A]}		District	Population			±% p.a.	Area		Density		Barangay	Coordinates^{[B]}
			(2020)		(2015)		km^{2}	sq mi	/km^{2}	/sq mi		
Amai Manabilang (Bumbaran)		1st	1.0%	12,124	10,401	+2.96%	544.10	210.08	22	57	17	7°47′07″N 124°40′51″E
Bacolod-Kalawi (Bacolod-Grande)		2nd	1.9%	23,129	20,841	+2.00%	491.57	189.80	47	120	26	7°51′27″N 124°08′32″E
Balabagan		2nd	2.5%	29,863	26,819	+2.07%	230.00	88.80	130	340	27	7°30′29″N 124°07′41″E
Balindong (Watu)		2nd	2.7%	32,573	29,180	+2.12%	453.94	175.27	72	190	38	7°54′37″N 124°11′59″E
Bayang		2nd	2.3%	28,023	23,965	+3.02%	230.00	88.80	120	310	49	7°47′37″N 124°11′55″E
Binidayan		2nd	2.2%	25,965	22,079	+3.14%	280.00	108.11	93	240	26	7°47′41″N 124°10′02″E
Buadiposo-Buntong		1st	1.5%	18,046	16,130	+2.16%	215.00	83.01	84	220	33	7°58′00″N 124°23′00″E
Bubong		1st	2.2%	26,514	22,336	+3.32%	798.50	308.30	33	85	36	7°58′59″N 124°23′06″E
Butig		2nd	1.9%	22,768	19,302	+3.19%	331.49	127.99	69	180	16	7°44′36″N 124°18′45″E
Calanogas		2nd	1.3%	14,985	13,750	+1.65%	195.00	75.29	77	200	17	7°44′07″N 124°04′53″E
Ditsaan-Ramain		1st	2.0%	24,406	22,299	+1.73%	527.98	203.85	46	120	35	7°58′44″N 124°21′06″E
Ganassi		2nd	2.6%	30,802	23,016	+5.70%	256.00	98.84	120	310	32	7°49′35″N 124°06′12″E
Kapai		1st	1.7%	20,581	18,894	+1.64%	398.50	153.86	52	130	20	8°04′49″N 124°24′18″E
Kapatagan		2nd	1.7%	20,498	15,521	+5.44%	288.13	111.25	71	180	15	7°27′00″N 124°08′00″E
Lumba-Bayabao (Maguing)		1st	3.8%	45,909	36,151	+4.65%	640.02	247.11	72	190	38	7°51′49″N 124°22′21″E
Lumbaca-Unayan		2nd	0.7%	8,131	7,260	+2.18%	42.28	16.32	190	490	9	7°43′26″N 124°14′19″E
Lumbatan		2nd	1.9%	22,780	19,105	+3.41%	158.39	61.15	140	360	21	7°47′08″N 124°15′23″E
Lumbayanague		2nd	1.6%	19,091	16,372	+2.97%	302.18	116.67	63	160	22	7°46′17″N 124°16′53″E
Madalum		2nd	2.2%	26,478	23,127	+2.61%	498.39	192.43	53	140	37	7°51′13″N 124°06′47″E
Madamba		2nd	1.8%	22,050	17,756	+4.21%	225.00	86.87	98	250	24	7°51′58″N 124°03′46″E
Maguing		1st	2.5%	30,436	24,531	+4.19%	815.04	314.69	37	96	34	7°53′07″N 124°24′09″E
Malabang		2nd	4.1%	49,088	43,957	+2.12%	198.10	76.49	250	650	37	7°35′47″N 124°04′25″E
Marantao		1st	3.2%	37,763	32,974	+2.62%	660.00	254.83	57	150	34	7°56′54″N 124°13′52″E
Marawi	†	1st	17.3%	207,010	201,785	+0.49%	87.55	33.80	2,400	6,200	98	8°00′12″N 124°17′12″E
Marogong		2nd	2.5%	30,118	21,319	+6.80%	365.00	140.93	83	210	24	7°40′39″N 124°09′00″E
Masiu		1st	2.8%	33,580	29,176	+2.71%	170.00	65.64	200	520	35	7°49′06″N 124°19′55″E
Mulondo		1st	1.7%	19,932	16,067	+4.19%	458.67	177.09	43	110	26	7°55′03″N 124°21′43″E
Pagayawan (Tatarikan)		2nd	1.3%	15,057	13,139	+2.63%	218.00	84.17	69	180	18	7°44′18″N 124°06′54″E
Piagapo		1st	2.5%	30,132	25,440	+3.28%	340.07	131.30	89	230	37	7°59′23″N 124°10′48″E
Picong (Sultan Gumander)		2nd	1.6%	18,907	16,615	+2.49%	280.00	108.11	68	180	19	7°41′05″N 123°56′09″E
Poona Bayabao (Gata)		1st	2.6%	31,141	22,227	+6.63%	242.34	93.57	130	340	25	7°51′05″N 124°20′21″E
Pualas		2nd	1.2%	14,526	12,866	+2.34%	182.89	70.61	79	200	23	7°49′12″N 124°04′47″E
Saguiaran		1st	2.2%	26,712	24,619	+1.57%	51.35	19.83	520	1,300	30	8°02′03″N 124°16′07″E
Sultan Dumalondong		2nd	1.0%	12,500	11,298	+1.94%	275.80	106.49	45	120	7	7°45′25″N 124°15′28″E
Tagoloan		1st	1.1%	12,602	11,169	+2.33%	362.35	139.90	35	91	19	8°05′18″N 124°27′30″E
Tamparan		1st	2.7%	32,074	25,874	+4.17%	170.00	65.64	190	490	44	7°52′35″N 124°20′10″E
Taraka		1st	2.3%	27,184	23,644	+2.69%	435.40	168.11	62	160	43	7°53′56″N 124°20′04″E
Tubaran		2nd	1.4%	16,896	14,749	+2.62%	435.00	167.95	39	100	21	7°41′50″N 124°06′49″E
Tugaya		2nd	2.1%	24,778	23,814	+0.76%	155.10	59.88	160	410	23	7°53′01″N 124°10′40″E
Wao		1st	4.2%	50,366	45,862	+1.80%	485.24	187.35	100	260	26	7°38′23″N 124°43′24″E
Total				1,195,518	1,045,429	+2.59%	13,494.37	5,210.21	89	230	1,159	(see GeoGroup box)
1. Former names are italicized.; 2. Coordinates are sortable by latitude. (Italicized entries indicate the generic location. Otherwise, they mark the city or town center).

== Demographics ==
Population census of Lanao del Sur
Year	Pop.	±% p.a.
1903	13,811	—
1918	65,531	+10.94%
1939	144,010	+3.82%
1948	212,312	+4.41%
1960	378,327	+4.93%
1970	455,508	+1.87%
1975	499,882	+1.88%
1980	404,971	−4.12%
1990	599,637	+4.00%
1995	686,193	+2.56%
2000	800,162	+3.35%
2007	1,138,544	+4.98%
2010	933,260	−6.98%
2015	1,045,429	+2.19%
2020	1,195,518	+2.86%
2024	1,368,137	+3.29%
Source: Philippine Statistics Authority

The population of Lanao del Sur in the 2024 census was 1,368,137 people, with a density of 350 inhabitants per square kilometre or 910 inhabitants per square mile.

The majority of people in the province are Maranaos, while some are Cebuanos, Ilocanos, Bicolanos, Hiligaynons, Kapampangans, Tagalogs, Maguindanaons, Iranuns, Higaonons, Zamboangueños, Tausugs, Yakans and Sama.

Maranao is the most commonly spoken language in the province. Iranun is the native language of most of the inhabitants of the municipality of Kapatagan. Also spoken are Maguindanao, Cebuano, and Chavacano followed by Tagalog and English. Minority languages such as Hiligaynon, Ilocano, Kapampangan, Higaonon are also spoken.

=== Religion ===
Religion in Lanao del Sur (2020)
Religion	percentage
Islam	94.7%
Christianity (chiefly Roman Catholic)	5.2%
Others	0.1%

Most of the people of Lanao del Sur are practitioners of Islam. The majority of them are Sunni. The number of Muslims in this province is 1,131,726 or nearly 95% of the total population of the province of Lanao del Sur.

== Economy ==
Poverty incidence of Lanao del Sur (%)

Source: Philippine Statistics Authority

== Education ==
- Mindanao State University, located in Marawi City
- Mindanao State University – Lanao National College of Arts and Trades, located in Panggao Saduc, Marawi City
- Jamiatu Muslim Mindanao, located in Matampay, Marawi City
- Jamiatul Philippine Al-Islamia, located in Bangon, Marawi City
- RC - Al Khwarizmi International College Foundation, Inc., located in Basak Malutlut, Marawi City
- Adiong Memorial State College, located in Ditsaan-Ramain, Lanao del Sur
- Lanao Agricultural College, located in Lumbatan, Lanao del Sur
- Philippine Muslim Teachers' College, located in Buadi Sacayo (Green), Marawi City
- Adiong Memorial College Foundation, Inc., located in Wao, Lanao del Sur
- Philippine Engineering and Agro-Industrial College, Inc., located in Lomidong, Marawi City
- Balabagan Trade School, located in Balabagan, Lanao del Sur
- Iranun Foundation College, Incorporated, located in Kapatagan, Lanao del Sur
- Lanao Central College, Incorporated, located in East Basak, Marawi City

== Hospitals ==
Public

- Amai Pakpak Medical Center
- Marawi City General Hospital
- Mindanao State University Medical Services and Hospital (University Infirmary)
- Balindong District Hospital, located in Brgy. Salipongan, Balindong, Lanao del Sur
- Unayan District Hospital, located in Brgy. Pagalamatan, Binidayan, Lanao del Sur
- Dr. Serapio B. Montañer Jr. Al Haj Memorial Hospital, located in Brgy. Mabul, Malabang, Lanao del Sur
- Wao District Hospital, located in Brgy. Western Wao (Pob.), Wao, Lanao del Sur
- Tamparan District Hospital, located in Brgy. Picarabawan, Tamparan, Lanao del Sur

Private

- Dr. Abdullah Hospital Foundation, Inc.
- Marawi Midtown Hospital
- Al-Shiek Hospital
- Sala'am Hospital Foundation, Inc.
- Ranao Doctors Polyclinic
- Mindalano Specialist Hospital Foundation, Inc.
- Hijrah Specialist Hospital, located in Brgy. Marawi Poblacion, Marawi
- Hijrah Hospital, located in Brgy. Daanaingud, Marantao, Lanao del Sur
- Tamparan Medical Foundation Inc. Hospital, located in Brgy. Picarabawan, Tamparan, Lanao del Sur

== UNESCO Designations in Lanao del Sur ==
UNESCO has inscribed one Maranao element, the Darangen Chants of the Maranao People of Lake Lanao, in the Representative List of the Intangible Cultural Heritage of Humanity in 2008. The element was earlier inscribed in the UNESCO Oral and Intangible Heritage of Humanity Representative List in 2005. The organization has also designated the Old Town of Tugaya as a UNESCO Home for Culture and Heritage. UNESCO has recommended for the nomination of Tugaya and all of Lanao del Sur's traditional crafts heritage in Representative List of the Intangible Cultural Heritage of Humanity, following reports made in 2014 and 2015. The Philippine ambassador to UNESCO and France noted that it will be better to inscribe Maranao's traditional crafts in the List of Intangible Cultural Heritage in Need of Urgent Safeguarding as they have been endangered due to the 2017 Battle of Marawi. The nomination is being finalized by the Philippine government, as announced in 2018. The torogans of Lanao are also recommended by UNESCO to be nominated in the World Heritage List once proper documentation and restoration has been completed. Two torogans have been bought by a controversial heritage resort company, Las Casas Filipinas de Acuzar, and were transported to Bataan, sparking a provincial campaign to get back the two royal houses to their ancestral homeland.
