= Marogong =

Municipality in Lanao del Sur, Philippines

Marogong Ingëd a Marogong Bayan ng Marogong بلدية ماروغونج
- Municipality
- Municipality of Marogong
- Flag Seal

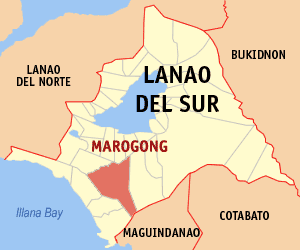
- Map of Lanao del Sur with Marogong highlighted
- Interactive map of Marogong
- Location within the Philippines
- Coordinates: 7°40′43″N 124°08′52″E
- Country: Philippines
- Region: Bangsamoro Autonomous Region in Muslim Mindanao
- Province: Lanao del Sur
- House district: 2nd district
- Parliamentary district: 5th district
- Founded: May 4, 1977
- Barangays: 24 (see Barangays)

Government
  - Type: Sangguniang Bayan
  - Mayor: Nassif B. Maruhom
  - Vice Mayor: Haroun T. Maruhom
  - House Representative: Yasser A. Balindong
  - Municipal Council: Members: Comainie A. Sangcopan; Aminoden A. Abdulsamad; Saadoden C. Abdulmadid; Mahmod B. Mustapha; Abdulhakim M. Socor; Abdulwahab M. Abdullah Satar; Acmad A. Abbas; Amer B. Sarip
  - Electorate: 16,060 voters (2025)

Area
  - Total: 365.00 km^{2} (140.93 sq mi)
- Elevation: 459 m (1,506 ft)
- Highest elevation: 942 m (3,091 ft)
- Lowest elevation: 191 m (627 ft)

Population (2024 census)
  - Total: 33,595
  - Density: 92.041/km^{2} (238.39/sq mi)
  - Households: 4,245

Economy
  - Income class: 2nd municipal income class
  - Poverty incidence: 40.11% (2023)
  - Revenue: ₱ 269.2 million (2024)
  - Assets: ₱ 531.5 million (2024)
  - Expenditure: ₱ 142.4 million (2024)
  - Liabilities: ₱ 100.1 million (2024)

Service provider
  - Electricity: Lanao del Sur Electric Cooperative (LASURECO)
  - Water: Marogong Water District (MWD)
  - Telecommunications: Globe, Smart Telecom and Starlink (Private providers)
- Time zone: UTC+8 (PST)
- ZIP code: 9303
- PSGC: 1903631000
- IDD : area code: +63 (0)63
- Native languages: Maranao; Tagalog
- Major religions: Islam
- Website: www.marogong-lds.gov.ph

Marogong, officially the Municipality of Marogong (Mëranaw: Ingëd a Marogong; Filipino: Bayan ng Marogong; Arabic: بلدية ماروغونج), is a municipality in the province of Lanao del Sur, Philippines. According to the 2024 census, it has a population of 33,595 people.

== History ==
The Municipality of Marogong was first created as a barangay on July 5, 1965, as part of the Municipality of Tubaran. 13 years after, this barangay was changed into a municipality by virtue of the signing of Presidential Decree (P.D.) No. 1131 dated May 4, 1977, signed into law by President Ferdinand Edralin Marcos, officially creating Barangay Marogong into a regular Municipality by separating it from the Municipality of Tubaran.

Marogong Municipality was first ran by the appointment of Abdulmadid P. Maruhom, who was succeeded by his children Monara Bae, Amron (Arumpac) and Haroun (Actor), now the incumbent Municipal Mayor.

Marogong therefore is suffering from poverty due to misgoverning. According to a report from the CKF organization, the Internal Revenue Allotment is being corrupted by its local government officials. Their people are hoping for change, and this coming election might be their hope.

Marogong was founded by a Sultan Abdulmadid P. Maruhom in 1954 when he explored the forest and settled in what would later become a small town and finally a regular municipality of Lanao del sur. Maruhom was the first appointed mayor and first elected mayor on January 30, 1980.

== Geography ==
=== Barangays ===
Marogong is politically subdivided into 24 barangays. Each barangay consists of puroks while some have sitios.

- Balut
- Bagumbayan
- Bitayan
- Bolawan
- Bonga
- Cabasaran
- Cahera
- Cairantana
- Canibongan
- Diragun
- Mantailoco
- Mapantao
- Marogong East
- Marogong Proper (Poblacion)
- Mayaman
- Pabrica
- Paigoay Coda
- Pasayanun
- Piangologan (Lilimo)
- Puracan
- Romagondong
- Sarang
- Cadayonan
- Calumbog

=== Climate ===
Climate data for Marogong, Lanao del Sur
Month	Jan	Feb	Mar	Apr	May	Jun	Jul	Aug	Sep	Oct	Nov	Dec	Year
Mean daily maximum °C (°F)	28 (82)	28 (82)	28 (82)	29 (84)	28 (82)	27 (81)	27 (81)	27 (81)	27 (81)	27 (81)	27 (81)	28 (82)	28 (82)
Mean daily minimum °C (°F)	22 (72)	22 (72)	22 (72)	23 (73)	23 (73)	23 (73)	22 (72)	22 (72)	22 (72)	22 (72)	23 (73)	22 (72)	22 (72)
Average precipitation mm (inches)	236 (9.3)	225 (8.9)	244 (9.6)	235 (9.3)	304 (12.0)	287 (11.3)	200 (7.9)	175 (6.9)	158 (6.2)	200 (7.9)	287 (11.3)	243 (9.6)	2,794 (110.2)
Average rainy days	24.3	22.3	26.0	27.2	28.3	27.2	25.8	24.8	22.2	25.4	27.2	25.8	306.5
Source: Meteoblue (modeled/calculated data, not measured locally)

== Demographics ==
Population census of Marogong
Year	Pop.	±% p.a.
1980	6,633	—
1990	12,775	+6.78%
1995	13,765	+1.41%
2000	16,165	+3.51%
2007	21,120	+3.76%
2010	18,541	−4.63%
2015	21,319	+2.69%
2020	30,118	+7.54%
2024	33,595	+2.66%
Source: Philippine Statistics Authority

== Economy ==
Poverty Incidence of Marogong

Source: Philippine Statistics Authority
