= Landslide victory =

Election result wherein a party or candidate wins by a large margin

A landslide victory is an election result in which the winning candidate or party achieves a decisive victory by an overwhelming margin, securing a very large majority of votes or seats far beyond the typical competitive outcome. The term became popular in the 19th century to describe a victory in which the opposition is "buried", similar to the way in which a geological landslide buries whatever is in its path. A landslide victory for one party is often accompanied by an electoral wipeout for the opposition, as the overwhelming support for the winning side inflicts a decisive loss on its rivals. What qualifies as a landslide victory can vary depending on the type of electoral system, as the term does not entail a precise, technical, or universally agreed-upon measurement. Instead, it is used informally in everyday language, making it subject to interpretation. Even within a single electoral system, there is no consensus on the exact margin that constitutes a landslide victory.

A landslide victory implies a powerful expression of popular will and a ringing endorsement by the electorate for the winner's political platform. A landslide can be viewed by a winning candidate or party as a mandate or a tacit authorization from the public to implement their proposed policies and pursue their agenda with confidence. Emboldened by the result, the winner may undertake ambitious reforms or significant policy shifts to reflect the electorate's desire for meaningful change. However, it can also indicate deep political polarization in an electorate or an unfair election.

A combination of factors, including charismatic leadership, a favorable shift in public sentiment driven by dissatisfaction with or support for the status quo, strategic electoral campaigning and a positive media portrayal, can create the conditions necessary for a landslide victory. A landslide may fundamentally reshape the political landscape of a country; one example of this phenomenon is Franklin D. Roosevelt's election as US president in 1932. In a post-landslide scenario, a winning party can sometimes implement its policies with little resistance, while its severely weakened opposition may struggle to perform essential checks and balances.

== Notable examples ==
=== Argentina ===
- 2011 Argentine presidential election – Cristina Fernández de Kirchner of the Justicialist Party was re-elected with over 54% of the vote.

=== Australia ===
Local and mayoral elections:

- 2008 Brisbane City Council election – The Liberal Party won a landslide victory over the Labor Party. Campbell Newman was re-elected Lord Mayor of Brisbane with 66.1% of the two-party-preferred vote, with a swing of 13.7%. The LNP won 16 of the 26 wards.

Labor's landslide victory at the 2021 Western Australian state election. Seats won by Labor are in red, seats won by the Liberals are in blue and seats won by the Nationals are in green.

- 2021 Mandurah City Council election – Rhys Williams was re-elected Mayor of Mandurah with 85% of the vote.

State and territory elections:

- 2021 Western Australian state election – Mark McGowan led the Labor Party to win 53 out of the 59 seats in the lower house. The Labor Party had a primary vote of 59.92% and a two-party-preferred vote of 69.68%. The National Party won 4 seats and the Liberal Party won 2 seats, making the National Party the official opposition, the first time they had held this status since the 1940s. To date, the election is the most decisive result at any Australian state or federal election since Federation, in terms of both percentage of lower house seats controlled by the governing party (89.8%) and two-party preferred margin.

Federal:

- 2025 Australian federal election – Anthony Albanese led the Labor Party to win 94 of 150 seats in the House of Representatives – the highest number held by one party of any election held in the country. Both leaders Peter Dutton of the Liberal Party and Adam Bandt of the Greens lost their seats in their respective divisions of Dickson and Melbourne. The result came as a surprise to public polling which predicted that the Coalition could form government.

=== Bangladesh ===
- 2026 Bangladeshi general election – The Bangladesh Nationalist Party won a 2/3rds majority in the Jatiya Sangsad.

=== Brazil ===
- 2002 and 2006 Brazilian presidential elections – Luiz Inácio Lula da Silva of the Workers' Party won with over 60% of the vote in the second rounds.

=== Bulgaria ===
- 2026 Bulgarian parliamentary election - Progressive Bulgaria won with 43.91% of the vote and 131 seats (121 were need for a majority), while the alliance GERB and Union of Democratic Forces came in second while collectively getting 13.18% of the vote and 39 seats.

=== Canada ===
In a Canadian federal election, a landslide victory occurs when a political party gains a significant majority of the House of Commons of Canada.

Landslide victories may also occur during provincial elections, and territorial elections in Yukon. Landslide victories are not possible for territorial elections in the Northwest Territories, and Nunavut, as its members are elected without reference to political parties, operating as a consensus government.

==== National landslide victories ====
The following Canadian federal elections resulted in landslide victories:

- 1935 – The Liberals, led by William Lyon Mackenzie King, won 171 seats (an increase of 34) and gained a majority of 50, while the Conservatives, led by R. B. Bennett, won just 39 (a decrease of 98).
- 1940 – The Liberals, led by William Lyon Mackenzie King, won 179 seats (an increase of 6) and gained a majority of 56 seats while the Progressive Conservatives, led by Robert James Manion, won just 39 (unchanged from their previous share).
- 1949 – The Liberals, led by Louis St. Laurent, won 191 seats (an increase of 73) and gained a majority of 59, while the Progressive Conservatives, led by George A. Drew, won just 41 (a decrease of 25).

The vote by province in 1958 shows the scale of the Progressive Conservatives' landslide victory.

- 1958 – The Progressive Conservatives, led by John Diefenbaker, won 208 seats (an increase of 96) and gained a majority of 75, while the Liberals, led by Lester B. Pearson, won just 48 (a decrease of 57).

The vote by province in 1984 shows the scale of the Progressive Conservatives' landslide victory.

- 1984 – The Progressive Conservatives, led by Brian Mulroney, won 211 seats (an increase of 111) and gained a majority of 69, while the Liberals, led by John Turner, won just 40 (a decrease of 95). Mulroney is the only prime minister to have won a majority of seats in every single province.
- 1993 – The Liberals, led by Jean Chrétien, won 177 seats (an increase of 96) and gained a majority of 29, while the Bloc Québecois, led by Lucien Bouchard, which ran only in Quebec, won 54 (an increase of 44). The ruling Progressive Conservatives, led by Kim Campbell, won just 2 (a decrease of 154).

=== Chile ===
- 2013 Chilean presidential election – Michelle Bachelet of the Socialist Party won a second term with over 62% of the vote in the second round.
- 2025 Chilean general election - José Antonio Kast of the Republican Party of Chile won the election with 58% of the vote in the second round.

=== El Salvador ===
- 2024 Salvadoran presidential election – Nayib Bukele of Nuevas Ideas was re-elected with 84.65% of the vote, the largest margin for a presidential candidate in the country's democratic history. His party also won 54 out of 60 seats in the Legislative Assembly.

=== France ===
- 2002 French presidential election – Jacques Chirac of Rally for the Republic won re-election in the second round with over 80% of the vote.

=== Germany ===
- 1957 West German federal election – The CDU/CSU won an absolute majority.

=== Hungary ===
- 2026 Hungarian parliamentary election – The TISZA Party won in a historic landslide, securing at least 141 of 199 seats in the National Assembly, the largest percentage of seats ever won by a Hungarian political party in a free election.

=== India ===
==== National election ====
- In the 1951–52, 1957, and 1962 Indian general elections, Jawaharlal Nehru's Indian National Congress secured landslide majorities in the Lok Sabha.
- In the 1971 and 1980 Indian general elections, Indira Gandhi's Indian National Congress secured landslide majorities in the Lok Sabha.
- 1984 Indian general election – The Indian National Congress led by Rajiv Gandhi was re-elected after winning over 400 seats in the lower house of India's Parliament.
- In the 2014 and 2019 Indian general elections, Narendra Modi's Bharatiya Janata Party secured landslide majorities in the Lok Sabha.

==== State election ====
- In the 1989 Sikkim Legislative Assembly election the governing Sikkim Sangram Parishad won all of the 32 seats in the legislative assembly and secured 70.41% of the votes polled.
- In the 2004 Sikkim Legislative Assembly election the governing Sikkim Democratic Front won 31 of the 32 seats in the legislative assembly and secured 71.09% of the votes polled.
- In the 2009 Sikkim Legislative Assembly election the governing Sikkim Democratic Front won all of the 32 seats in the legislative assembly and secured 65.91% of the votes polled.
- In the 2010 Bihar Legislative Assembly election the governing National Democratic Alliance alliance won 206 of the 243 seats in the state in a landslide. The Janata Dal (United) won 115 seats on its own. No other political party could win enough seats to be recognised as official opposition in the state.
- In the 2015 Delhi Legislative Assembly election the Aam Aadmi Party won 67 of the 70 seats in the legislative assembly and secured 54.3% of the votes polled.
- In the 2017 Uttar Pradesh Legislative Assembly election the Bharatiya Janata Party led National Democratic Alliance won 325 of the 403 seats in the legislative assembly and secured 39.67% of the votes polled. It remains one of the biggest mandates in the most populous state of India.
- In the 2022 Punjab Legislative Assembly election the Aam Aadmi Party won 92 of the 117 seats in the legislative assembly and secured 42.01% of the votes polled.
- In the 2022 Gujarat Legislative Assembly election the governing Bharatiya Janata Party won a landslide victory of 156 seats of the 182 seats in the state (85.7%), the most ever won by any party in Gujarat's history and securing 52.50% of the total votes polled. No other political party could win enough seats to be recognised as official opposition in the state.
- In the 2024 Sikkim Legislative Assembly election the governing Sikkim Krantikari Morcha won 31 of 32 seats in the legislative assembly and secured 58.38% of the votes polled. No other political party could win enough seats to be recognised as official opposition in the state.
- In the 2024 Maharashtra Legislative Assembly election the governing Bharatiya Janata Party led Maha Yuti alliance won 235 of the 288 seats in the state in a landslide. It was the biggest victory recorded in the state. The Bharatiya Janata Party on its own won 132 of the 149 seats it contesting recording a 88.59 % win percentage. No other political party could win enough seats to be recognised as official opposition in the state.
- In the 2025 Bihar Legislative Assembly election the governing Bharatiya Janata Party led National Democratic Alliance won 202 of the 243 seats in the state in a landslide. The Bharatiya Janata Party on its own won 89 of the 101 seats it contesting recording a 88.11 % win percentage.
- In the 2026 Assam Legislative Assembly election the governing Bharatiya Janata Party led National Democratic Alliance secured a landslide victory, securing 102 out of 126 seats.
- In the 2026 Kerala Legislative Assembly election, the Indian National Congress-led United Democratic Front (Kerala) won 102 out of 140 seats, winning with a 72.85% win percentage.
- In the 2026 West Bengal Legislative Assembly election, the Bharatiya Janata Party – West Bengal secured 208 out of 294 seats, securing a landslide victory with a 70.74% win percentage.

==== Local election ====
- In 2025 Haryana local elections, in Faridabad Municipal Corporation, Bharatiya Janata Party candidate Praveen Joshi polled 4,16,927 votes, securing roughly 80.6% of the valid votes in a contest against the Congress candidate (who received 1,00,075 votes). This margin of 3.16 lakh votes is cited as the highest-ever for a mayoral election in India.
- In 2026 Gujarat local elections, the ruling Bharatiya Janata Party, won a landslide victory, winning the majority of the 84 municipalities, 34 district panchayats, and 260 taluka panchayats. The BJP also won all 15 municipal corporations, in a show of strength. The party also polled 59.36% of the total votes polled in the election.

=== Indonesia ===
- 2009 Indonesian presidential election – Susilo Bambang Yudhoyono of the Democratic Party won in the first round with over 60% of the vote.
- 2024 Indonesian presidential election – Prabowo Subianto of the Gerindra Party won in the first round, receiving over 96 million votes and 58.59% of the vote.

=== Jamaica ===
- 2020 Jamaican general election – The Jamaica Labour Party led by Andrew Holness was re-elected after winning a supermajority in Parliament.

=== Japan ===
- 1986 Japanese general election – The Liberal Democratic Party led by Yasuhiro Nakasone was re-elected after winning 300 seats in Parliament and an outright majority.
- 2009 Japanese general election – The Democratic Party of Japan led by Yukio Hatoyama was elected after winning over 300 seats in Parliament.
- 2026 Japanese general election – The Liberal Democratic Party led by Sanae Takaichi was re-elected after winning a supermajority (316 seats) in Parliament. The landslide was so decisive that the LDP, which actually won 330 seats, had to forfeit 14 of those simply due to not having enough list candidates.

=== Malaysia ===
==== Federal election ====
Results of the Malaysian election of 2004. Barisan Nasional won the constituencies in blue.

- 2004 Malaysian general election – Ruling coalition Barisan Nasional (BN), led by Prime Minister Abdullah Ahmad Badawi won 198 out of 219 seats in the Dewan Rakyat and 63.8% of the popular vote, controlling almost all seats in the state assemblies. Abdullah had only been in office for four months after taking over the post of Prime Minister from Mahathir Mohamad, who had served for 22 years.

==== State election ====
- 2022 Johor state election – Opposition side in 2018 Johor state election, Barisan Nasional gained over two-third Supermajority, 40 out of 56 seats, regained control from Pakatan Harapan, which has been lost over half of their winning seat in 2018 Johor state election. After that, Onn Hafiz Ghazi become the Menteri Besar of Johor

=== Mexico ===
- 2024 Mexican presidential election – Claudia Sheinbaum of Morena won with over 60% of the vote, becoming the country's first female president.

=== Nepal ===
- 2026 Nepalese general election – The Rastriya Swatantra Party won a landslide victory, gaining a majority in the House of Representatives without the need for a coalition for the first time since 1999, falling just 2 short of a supermajority.

=== New Zealand ===
- Until 1996, New Zealand used the traditional first-past-the-post system as in the U.K. to determine representation in its Parliament. Thus, landslide elections at that time were defined in an identical fashion, i.e. where one party won an overwhelming majority of the seats. Since 1996, New Zealand has used the mixed member proportional system as in Germany, making landslides much less likely.

First past the post

- 1893 election – The Liberals won 51 seats and 57.8% of the vote while the Conservatives won 13 seats and just 24.5% of the vote.
- 1899 election – The Liberals won 49 seats and 52.7% of the vote while the Conservatives won 19 seats and just 36.6% of the vote.
- 1905 election – The Liberals won 58 seats and 53.1% of the vote while the Conservatives won 16 seats and just 29.7% of the vote.
- 1925 election – The Reform Party won 55 seats while the Labour & Liberal parties won just 23 seats combined.
- 1935 election – The Labour Party won 53 seats while the Coalition won just 19 seats.
- 1938 election – The Labour Party won 53 seats while the National Party won just 25 seats.
- 1990 election – The National Party won 67 seats while the Labour Party won just 29 seats.

=== Philippines ===
==== Presidential elections ====
- 1935 Philippine presidential election – Manuel L. Quezon of the Nacionalista Party won decisively with nearly 68% of the vote while Emilio Aguinaldo won just around 18.5%.
- 1941 Philippine presidential election – Manuel L. Quezon of the Nacionalista Party easily won reelection with around 80% of the vote while Juan Sumulong of the Popular Front won just around 18% of the vote.
- 1953 Philippine presidential election – Ramon Magsaysay of the Nacionalista Party defeated the incumbent president Elpidio Quirino of the Liberal Party with nearly 69% of the vote.
- 1969 Philippine presidential election – Sitting president Ferdinand Marcos of the Nacionalista Party overwhelmingly won reelection with roughly 61.5% of the vote, becoming the first president of the Third Republic of the Philippines to be reelected.
- 1981 Philippine presidential election and referendum – Incumbent president Ferdinand Marcos won reelection with around 88% of the votes, the highest margin of victory in Philippine election history.
- 2022 Philippine presidential election – Bongbong Marcos of the Partido Federal ng Pilipinas won with nearly 58% of the vote.

==== Senate elections ====
- 1949 Philippine Senate election – The Liberal Party won all the 8 seats contested in the election, wiping out the Nacionalistas and pushing their total number of seats in the Senate up to 17.
- 1951 Philippine Senate election – The Nacionalista Party won all 9 contested seats, with Senate President Mariano Jesús Cuenco losing his Senate seat. While the Liberals still held a majority after this election, the Nacionalistas were able to push their total number of seats up to 11.
- 1955 Philippine Senate election – The Nacionalista Party won all 8 contested seats in the election, while the Liberal Party lost all 4 of their remaining seats in the Senate. This was the first time in the history of the Third Republic that a single party had control of all seats in the Senate.
- 1957 Philippine Senate election – The Nacionalista Party won 6 of the 8 seats contested in the election, bringing down their total number of seats to 22, the Liberal Party meanwhile only managed to win 2 seats in the Senate.
- 1967 Philippine Senate election – The Nacionalista Party won 6 of the 8 seats contested in this election, bringing their total number of seats from 11 to 15. The Liberal Party only managed to win 1 seat contested in this election.
- 1969 Philippine Senate election – The Nacionalista Party won 6 of the 8 seats contested in this election, bringing their total number of seats from 15 to 17. The Liberal Party only managed to take 2 seats.

With the establishment of the Fifth Republic and the change to a multi-party system, Senate elections are now usually contested by electoral alliances consisting of multiple parties.

- 1987 Philippine Senate election – The Lakas ng Bayan party won 22 out of the 24 seats contested in the elections, while the opposition Grand Alliance for Democracy won just 2 seats.
- 1992 Philippine Senate election – The Laban ng Demokratikong Pilipino party won 16 of the 24 seats contested in the election.
- 1995 Philippine Senate election – The Laban ng Demokrationg Pilipino party won 9 of the 12 seats contested in the election, with the rival Nationalist People's Coalition winning just 3 seats.
- 2001 Philippine Senate election – The government-backed People Power Coalition won 8 of the 13 seats contested in the election.
- 2007 Philippine Senate election – The Genuine Opposition alliance won 7 of the 12 seats contested, with the administration-backed TEAM Unity winning just 3 seats.
- However following an electoral protest by GO candidate Koko Pimentel, Senator Juan Miguel Zubiri chose to resign with the Senate Electoral Tribunal proclaiming afterwards that Pimental indeed won the election, claiming 12th place and thus bringing GO's seats up to 8 and reducing TEAM Unity's seats to just 2.
- 2013 Philippine Senate election – The government-backed Team PNoy coalition won 9 of the 12 seats contested in this election, while the opposition United Nationalist Alliance won just 3.
- 2019 Philippine Senate election – The government-backed Hugpong ng Pagbabago coalition won 9 of the 12 seats contested in this election. Meanwhile the opposition Otso Diretso were not able to win any seats in the Senate, the first time under the 1987 Constitution that the opposing alliance failed to win a single seat.

==== House of Representatives elections ====
Before 1972, the House of Representatives was under a two-party system dominated by either Nacionalistas or the Liberals. By the time the 1987 election took place however, new parties have garnered enough support to win multiple seats in Congress, effectively switching into a multi-party system and thus made landslides from a single party very unlikely.

- 1925 Philippine House of Representatives elections – The reconciled Nacionalista Consolidado won with 64 seats while the opposition Democrata Party won just 22 seats.
- 1938 Philippine legislative election – The Nacionalista Party won all 88 seats in the National Assembly of the Philippines.
- 1941 Philippine House of Representatives elections – The Nacionalista Party won 95 out of 98 seats in the House of Representatives of the Philippines.
- 1957 Philippine House of Representatives elections – The Nacionalista Party won 82 out of 102 seats with around 61% of the vote.
- 1961 Philippine House of Representatives elections – The Nacionalista Pary won 74 (a decrease of 7) of the 104 seats in the House, with around 61% of the vote.
- 1969 Philippine House of Representatives elections – The Nacionalista Party won 88 of the 110 seats in the House, with around 59% of the vote.
- 1978 Philippine parliamentary election – In the inaugural elections of the Batasang Pambansa under the parliamentary system, Ferdinand Marcos led the Kilusang Bagong Lipunan to victory with 150 seats, thus making him the first prime minister of the country since 1899. The opposition Lakas ng Bayan alliance of Ninoy Aquino failed to win a single seat.
- 2007 Philippine House of Representatives elections – The administration-backed TEAM Unity won 142 of the 218 district seats contested in the House.

=== Portugal ===
- 1976 Portuguese presidential election – António Ramalho Eanes won with 61% of the votes in the first round.
- 1987 Portuguese legislative election – The Social Democratic Party, led by Aníbal Cavaco Silva, was re-elected with 50.2% of the votes and 148 seats.
- 1991 Portuguese presidential election – Mário Soares of the Socialist Party was re-elected with more than 70% of the votes.
- 1991 Portuguese legislative election – The Social Democratic Party, led by Aníbal Cavaco Silva, was re-elected for a 3rd term with 50.6% of the votes and 135 seats.
- 2005 Portuguese legislative election – The Socialist Party, led by José Sócrates, won with 45% of the votes and an outright majority for the first time.
- 2021 Portuguese presidential election – Marcelo Rebelo de Sousa of the Social Democratic Party was re-elected with nearly 61% of the votes.
- 2026 Portuguese presidential election – António José Seguro of the Socialist Party won with nearly 67% of the vote in the second round.

=== Samoa ===
Results of the 2006 Samoan general election by constituency

- 2006 Samoan general election – The Human Rights Protection Party, led by Tuilaʻepa Saʻilele Malielegaoi, won a landslide victory, winning 33 seats, an increase of ten. The main opposition party, the new Samoa Democratic United Party, won 10 seats.
- 2016 Samoan general election – The Human Rights Protection Party, led by Tuilaʻepa Saʻilele Malielegaoi, won by a landslide victory, winning 35 of the 49 seats in the Legislative Assembly, gaining six seats. The main opposition party, the Tautua Samoa Party (led by Palusalue Faʻapo II) only won two seats, losing 11 seats. Independents won 13 seats.

=== South Africa ===
- From 1994 to 2019, the African National Congress won supermajorities in the National Assembly of South Africa under universal suffrage.

=== Taiwan ===
- 2008 Taiwanese presidential election – Ma Ying-jeou of the Kuomintang won with over 58% of the vote.
- 2016 and 2020 Taiwanese presidential elections – Tsai Ing-wen of the Democratic Progressive Party won with over 56% of the vote both times, while her party also secured consecutive majorities in the Legislative Yuan.

=== Thailand ===
National elections:

- 2005 Thai general election – The Thai Rak Thai Party led by incumbent Prime Minister Thaksin Shinawatra won a historic landslide victory, securing 377 of the 500 seats (60.48% of the vote) in the House of Representatives. This marked the first time in Thai history that a single party won an outright parliamentary majority, allowing it to form a single-party government.
- 2011 Thai general election – The Pheu Thai Party led by Yingluck Shinawatra won a decisive landslide victory with 265 of the 500 seats (53% of the vote), paving the way for her to become the first female prime minister of Thailand.

Local and mayoral elections:

- 2022 Bangkok gubernatorial election – Independent candidate Chadchart Sittipunt won a record-breaking landslide victory with over 1.38 million votes (51.8%), becoming the first governor-elect to lead in all 50 districts of the city. He received more votes than all other candidates combined and defeated the runner-up by over one million votes, the largest margin in the capital's election history.

=== Ukraine ===
- 2019 Ukrainian presidential election – Volodymyr Zelenskyy won all regions but one and 73.22% of the popular vote in the second round of the election, unseating incumbent Petro Poroshenko, who received 24.45% of the popular vote. This landslide victory was the largest margin in the history of Ukrainian presidential elections.

=== United Kingdom ===
In UK general elections, a landslide victory involves winning a large majority in parliament and often goes with a large swing from one party to another as well. Landslide victories have usually occurred after a long period of government from one particular party and a change in the popular mood.

Large majorities, however, are not always the advantage they appear to be. Anthony Seldon gives a number of examples of the infighting that can arise from large majorities. He claims that a "sweet spot" parliamentary majority of 35–50 seats is enough to protect from by-elections and still comfortably pass legislation.

Notable landslide election results

- 1906 – Henry Campbell-Bannerman led his Liberal Party to victory over Arthur Balfour's Conservative Party who lost more than half their seats, including his own seat in Manchester East, as a result of the large national swing to the Liberal Party (The 5.4% swing from the Conservatives to Liberals was at the time the highest ever achieved). The Liberal Party won 397 seats (an increase of 214) and a majority of 124 seats, while the Conservative Party were left with 156 seats (a decrease of 246).

The Labour Party landslide victory in 1997

- 1945 – Clement Attlee led the Labour Party to victory over Winston Churchill's Conservative Party, a 12.0% swing from the Conservatives to Labour. Labour won 393 seats (an increase of 239) while the Conservative Party were left with 197 (a decrease of 190).
- 1983 – Margaret Thatcher led the Conservative Party to win a landslide victory (her second term in office) with 397 seats (an increase of 58, the party's highest seat count since 1931) and a majority of 144 seats, while the Labour Party led by Michael Foot won 209 seats (a decrease of 60). Additionally, in the popular vote the party finished just two points ahead of the SDP–Liberal Alliance. However, they receive far more seats due to the first past the post system.
- 1997 – Tony Blair led the Labour Party to win a first landslide victory with 418 seats (an increase of 146) and gained an overall majority of 179 while the Conservative Party led by John Major won 165 seats (a decrease of 178). The swing from the Conservatives to Labour was 10.2% and was the second biggest general election victory of the 20th Century after 1931.
- 2001 – Tony Blair led the Labour Party to win a second landslide victory with 412 seats (a decrease of 6) and retained an overall majority of 167 while the Conservative Party led by William Hague won 166 seats (an increase of 1), making Tony Blair the first Labour Prime Minister to serve two consecutive full terms in office.

The Conservative Party landslide victory in 2019

- 2019 – Boris Johnson led the Conservative Party to win a landslide victory (his second term in office) with 365 seats (an increase of 48, the party's highest seat count since 1987) and a majority of 80 seats, while the Labour Party led by Jeremy Corbyn won 202 seats (a decrease of 60, the party's worst result since 1935). The election led to 54 Labour seats changing to Conservative predominantly in the Midlands and Northern England – some of which had been held by Labour since the first half of the 20th century.
- 2024 – Keir Starmer led the Labour Party to win a landslide victory with 411 seats (an increase of 211, the party's highest seat count since 2001) and a majority of 172 seats, while the Conservative Party led by Rishi Sunak won 121 seats (a decrease of 251, the party's worst ever result, exceeding the previous worst defeat of 1906).

=== United States ===
A landslide victory in presidential elections occurs when a candidate has an overwhelming majority in the Electoral College. In federal and state congressional elections, a landslide victory occurs when a party wins 60% or more of the seats in a legislative chamber.

==== Presidential elections ====
- 1904 – Theodore Roosevelt (R) received 336 (70.6%) of the electoral votes while Alton B. Parker (D) received only 140 (29.4%)
- 1912 – Woodrow Wilson (D) received 435 (81.9%) of the electoral votes while Theodore Roosevelt (P) received only 88 (16.6%) and William Howard Taft (R) received only 8 (1.5%)
- 1920 – Warren G. Harding (R) received 404 (76.1%) of the electoral votes while James M. Cox (D) received only 127 (23.9%). Additionally, Harding won 60.4% of the popular vote.
- 1924 – Calvin Coolidge (R) received 382 (71.9%) of the electoral votes while John W. Davis (D) received only 136 (25.6%) and Robert M. La Follette (P) received 13 (2.4%).
- 1928 – Herbert Hoover (R) received 444 (83.6%) of the electoral votes while Al Smith (D) received only 87 (16.4%).
- 1932 – Franklin D. Roosevelt (D) received 472 (88.9%) of the electoral votes while Herbert Hoover (R) received only 59 (11.1%).

The map of the Electoral College in 1936 shows the scale of Franklin D. Roosevelt's landslide victory.

- 1936 – Franklin D. Roosevelt (D) received 523 (98.5%) of the electoral votes—the largest share since 1820 and the largest in a non-unanimous election—while Alf Landon (R) received only 8 (1.5%). Additionally, Roosevelt received 60.8% of the popular vote.
- 1940 – Franklin D. Roosevelt (D) received 449 (84.6%) of the electoral votes while Wendell Willkie (R) received only 82 (15.4%).
- 1944 – Franklin D. Roosevelt (D) received 432 (81.4%) of the electoral votes while Thomas E. Dewey (R) received only 99 (18.6%).
- 1952 – Dwight D. Eisenhower (R) received 442 (83.2%) of the electoral votes while Adlai Stevenson II (D) received only 89 (16.8%).
- 1956 – Dwight D. Eisenhower (R) received 457 (86.1%) of the electoral votes while Adlai Stevenson II (D) received only 73 (13.7%).
- 1964 – Lyndon B. Johnson (D) received 486 (90.3%) of the electoral votes while Barry Goldwater (R) received only 52 (9.7%). Additionally, Johnson received 61.1% of the popular vote.

The map of the Electoral College in 1972 shows the scale of Richard Nixon's landslide victory.

- 1972 – Richard Nixon (R) received 520 (96.7%) of the electoral votes while George McGovern (D) received only 17 (3.2%). One Republican elector voted for John Hospers of the Libertarian Party. Additionally, Nixon received 60.7% of the popular vote.
- 1980 – Ronald Reagan (R) received 489 (90.9%) of the electoral votes while Jimmy Carter (D) received only 49 (9.1%).

The map of the Electoral College in 1984 shows the scale of Ronald Reagan's landslide victory.

- 1984 – Ronald Reagan (R) received 525 (97.6%) of the electoral votes while Walter Mondale (D) received only 13 (2.4%). Additionally, Reagan received 58.8% of the popular vote.
- 1988 – George H. W. Bush (R) received 426 (79.2%) of the electoral votes while Michael Dukakis (D) received only 111 (20.8%).
- 1996 – Bill Clinton (D) received 379 (70.4%) of the electoral votes while Bob Dole (R) received 159 (29.6%) and Ross Perot of the Reform Party received none.

==== Congressional elections ====
House of Representatives

- 1932 – Coinciding with Franklin D. Roosevelt's win in the presidential election, the Democratic Party won 313 seats with 54.5% of the popular vote, which caused the Republican Party to lose its two-seat majority. This election marked a beginning of political dominance for the Democratic Party that would last until the 1994 election.
- 1934 – The Democratic Party gained nine seats from the previous election.
- 1936 – Coinciding with Franklin D. Roosevelt's election to a second term as president, the Democratic Party gained an additional twelve seats from the previous election with 55.9% of the popular vote, bringing the total amount of seats held by the party to 334. This would be the most recent election where one party won more than 300 seats in the House of Representatives, and was the last of four straight elections where Republicans lost seats due to the effects of the Great Depression.

Senate

- 1920 – Coinciding with Warren G. Harding's win in the presidential election, the Republican Party gained ten seats from the Democratic Party, giving them a 59–37 majority.
- 1932 – Coinciding with Franklin D. Roosevelt's win in the presidential election, the Democratic Party gained twelve seats from the Republican Party, giving them a 60–36 majority.

== See also ==
- Electoral wipeout
- Realigning election
- Wave elections in the United States
- Blowout (sports)
- Landslide (board game)
- Paper candidate
