= List of senators of the Philippines in the 15th Congress by seniority =

This is a complete list of senators of the Philippines during the 15th Congress of the Philippines listed by seniority from June 30, 2010, to June 30, 2013.

The criteria for seniority used in this article are derived from the cumulative length of service of a member of the Senate prior to the current Congress. Although an official roster ranking senators by seniority is not publicly available, their total cumulative years of service have been used to determine seniority. It has long been customary, following the practice of the United States Senate, to elect the most senior senator as either president of the Senate or president pro tempore, although this practice has become less common in the modern Senate. Furthermore, seniority is traditionally considered in the selection of chairpersons of major Senate committees.

In cases where senators have equal cumulative service, seniority is determined by the following criteria, in order:

- Longest uninterrupted period of service
- Earlier date on which the cumulative length of service was achieved
- Alphabetical order of surnames

In this Congress, Edgardo Angara was the most senior senator, having previously served 20 years in Senate, while Koko Pimentel was the most junior senator.

== List of senators by seniority ==
Rank	Senator	Party		Length of previous tenures (Dates of previous tenures)	Notes
Rank	Senator	Start of Congress	End of Congress	Length of previous tenures (Dates of previous tenures)	Notes
1	Edgardo Angara	LDP		20 years, 0 days (June 30, 1987 – June 30, 1998; June 30, 2001 – June 30, 2010)	
2	Juan Ponce Enrile	PMP		16 years, 320 days (August 15, 1987 – June 30, 1992; June 30, 1995 – June 30, 2001; June 30, 2004 – June 30, 2010)	Senate president (until June 5, 2013)
3	Tito Sotto	NPC		12 years, 0 days (June 30, 1992 – June 30, 2004)	
4	Franklin Drilon	Liberal		12 years, 0 days (June 30, 1995 – June 30, 2007)	
5	Serge Osmeña	Independent		12 years, 0 days (June 30, 1995 – June 30, 2007)	
6	Miriam Defensor Santiago	PRP		12 years, 0 days (June 30, 1995 – June 30, 2001; June 30, 2004 – June 30, 2010)	
7	Gregorio Honasan	Independent	UNA	12 years, 0 days (June 30, 1995 – June 30, 2004; June 30, 2007 – June 30, 2010)	
8	Loren Legarda	NPC		9 years, 0 days (June 30, 1998 – June 30, 2004; June 30, 2007 – June 30, 2010)	
9	Joker Arroyo	Lakas		9 years, 0 days (June 30, 2001 – June 30, 2010)	
10	Panfilo Lacson	Independent		9 years, 0 days (June 30, 2001 – June 30, 2010)	
11	Kiko Pangilinan	Liberal		9 years, 0 days (June 30, 2001 – June 30, 2010)	
12	Manny Villar	Nacionalista		9 years, 0 days (June 30, 2001 – June 30, 2010)	
13	Ralph Recto	Liberal		6 years, 0 days (June 30, 2001 – June 30, 2007)	
14	Pia Cayetano	Nacionalista		6 years, 0 days (June 30, 2004 – June 30, 2010)	
15	Jinggoy Estrada	PMP		6 years, 0 days (June 30, 2004 – June 30, 2010)	Senate president pro tempore Senate president (acting, from June 5, 2013)
16	Lito Lapid	Lakas		6 years, 0 days (June 30, 2004 – June 30, 2010)	
17	Bong Revilla	Lakas		6 years, 0 days (June 30, 2004 – June 30, 2010)	
18	Francis Escudero	Independent		3 years, 0 days (June 30, 2007 – June 30, 2010)	
19	Alan Peter Cayetano	Nacionalista		3 years, 0 days (June 30, 2007 – June 30, 2010)	
20	Antonio Trillanes	Nacionalista		3 years, 0 days (June 30, 2007 – June 30, 2010)	
21	Juan Miguel Zubiri	Lakas		3 years, 0 days (June 30, 2007 – June 30, 2010)	Resigned on August 3, 2011, amid an on-going electoral protest.
22	Bongbong Marcos	Nacionalista			
23	TG Guingona	Liberal			
24	Koko Pimentel	PDP–Laban			Took office on August 15, 2011, after winning an electoral protest against Juan Miguel Zubiri.
