= Presidential Electoral Tribunal =

Philippine government commission overseeing head of state selection protests

- Interactive map of Presidential Electoral Tribunal
- 14°34′46″N 120°59′3″E
- Established: June 21, 1957; 69 years ago
- Jurisdiction: Philippines
- Location: Manila
- Coordinates: 14°34′46″N 120°59′3″E
- Composition method: Same as composition of the Supreme Court
- Authorized by: Constitution of the Philippines
- Judge term length: No fixed term (retirement at the age 70)
- Number of positions: 15
- Annual budget: ₱144.92 million (2020)
- Website: sc.judiciary.gov.ph

Chief Justice of the Supreme Court of the Philippines
- Currently: Rodil Zalameda
- Since: November 6, 2026

The Presidential Electoral Tribunal (PET) is an electoral tribunal that decides election protests involving the election of the President of the Philippines and Vice President of the Philippines. It is composed of justices of the Supreme Court of the Philippines. The equivalent tribunals for the Congress of the Philippines are House of Representatives Electoral Tribunal and the Senate Electoral Tribunal.

It was established under Republic Act No. 1793 on June 21, 1957 during the term of then President Carlos P. Garcia and re-constituted under Batas Pambansa Blg. 884 (National Law No. 884) on December 3, 1985 during the term of then President Ferdinand Marcos.

Members of the Tribunal receive a monthly allowance of 100,000 Philippine pesos on top of their regular salary.

== Cases handled ==
- Miriam Defensor Santiago vs. Fidel Ramos (1992): The tribunal dismissed Santiago's petition after she ran for a Senate seat in 1995 and won.
- Fernando Poe Jr. vs. Gloria Macapagal Arroyo (2004): The tribunal dismissed Poe's petition after he died in late 2004.
- Loren Legarda vs. Noli de Castro (2004): The tribunal dismissed Legarda's petition after a retabulation didn't affect the result, and after she ran for a Senate seat in 2007 and won.
- Mar Roxas vs. Jejomar Binay (2010): The tribunal dismissed Roxas' petition in 2016 after Binay's term ended in 2016 without the case being resolved.
- Bongbong Marcos vs. Leni Robredo (2016): The tribunal dismissed Marcos' petition in 2021 after the pilot recount of the chosen provinces of Negros Oriental, Iloilo, and Camarines Sur which resulted in Robredo widening her lead even more by 15,093 additional votes.

== See also ==
- Commission of Elections (COMELEC)
- Philippine presidential elections
- Constitution of the Philippines
