= Reli German =

Filipino activist and public relations specialist (1939–2026)

- Born: Aurelio German; November 25, 1939
- Died: July 8, 2026 (aged 86)
- Occupation: Public relations consultant
- Known for: Co-founder of the August Twenty-One Movement
- Spouse: Josephine German
- Children: 5

Aurelio German (November 25, 1939 – July 8, 2026) was a Filipino public relations consultant and activist.

== Career ==
German was tapped to help produce commercials and jingle for Ferdinand Marcos' presidential campaign for the 1965 Philippine presidential election. Marcos' wife, Imelda personally oversaw the production of the materials.

He was among the co-founders of the August Twenty-One Movement (ATOM) during the martial law era under President Marcos. The group was established in September 1983, two months after the assassination of Ninoy Aquino. He was the person who came up with the group's acronym. He was credited with contributing the eventual success of the People Power Revolution of 1986 which deposed Marcos.

German as a public relations expert worked with various clients, including future President Joseph Estrada.

He was also the campaign manager for the TEAM Unity during the 2007 Philippine general election. The electoral alliance was backed by incumbent President Gloria Macapagal Arroyo.

German took exception to remarks by former Chief Justice Reynato Puno that "truth is the first victim of spin doctors" during a speech before religious and civil leaders in Baguio in August 2015. German defended his profession in public relations that while they rely largely on the information and briefings provided to them by their clients, that they do their own research and do not discount the truth in their pursuit to make their clients more appealing to a target audience.

== Personal life and death ==
German was married to Josephine "Bunny" German. He had five children.

German was later diagnosed with multiple system atrophy. He died in his sleep on July 8, 2026, at the age of 86.
