= David v. Poe =

2015 court case

- Court: Senate Electoral Tribunal
- Full case name: Rizalito Y. David versus Mary Grace Poe Llamanzares
- Decided: November 17, 2015
- Citation: SET Case No.001-15
- Transcript: Decision

Case history
- Appealed to: Supreme Court of the Philippines
- Subsequent actions: Petition for certiorari was dismissed by the Supreme Court and declare the respondent as a natural-born Filipino citizen qualified to hold office as Senator of the Republic. (G.R. no. 221538)

Court membership
- Judges sitting: Carpio (Senior Associate Justice), de Castro, Brion (Associate Justices), Aquino, P. Cayetano, Villar, Binay, Sotto, Legarda (Senator-members)

Case opinions
- Concurrence: Aquino, P. Cayetano, Villar, Sotto, Legarda
- Dissent: Carpio, de Castro, Brion, Binay

Rizalito Y. David versus Mary Grace Poe Llamanzares, better known as David v. Poe, is a SET Case No.001-15. It is a 2015 court case filed before the Senate Electoral Tribunal (SET) that sought to remove Grace Poe from the Philippine Senate—which would have effectively blocked her from running for president in the 2016 elections—because she was a foundling and therefore it was impossible to determine whether she was a natural-born citizen, a requirement for both offices.

== Background ==
I am Grace Poe. A Filipino. A daughter, wife and mother. And with God's grace, I offer myself for the country's highest calling as your President.

— Grace Poe's ending remarks of her speech during her announcement last September 16, 2015.

As early as 2014, there was widespread speculation that Poe, then a senator, was a potential presidential or vice presidential candidate in the 2016 general elections.

On August 6, 2015, a quo warranto petition was submitted by socio-political analyst and radio commentator Rizalito David to the SET to remove Poe from her seat in the Senate based on the assertion that, as a foundling of unknown parentage, she is not a natural-born Filipino citizen. Under the Philippine nationality law only natural-born citizens are eligible to be elected in national office.

On September 16, 2015, Poe declared her presidential bid, in front of hundreds of supporters, family and friends at the Bahay ng Alumni, University of the Philippines, Diliman, Quezon City under the newly formed coalition of Partido Pilipinas, composed of Makabayan Coalition and led by the Nationalist People's Coalition. Former Philippine President and then Mayor of Manila Joseph Estrada has given his support to her. On her speech announcing her presidential bid, Poe laid down a 20-point program of government if she would be elected.

David, a defeated senatorial candidate in the 2013 midterm elections, filed his certificate of candidacy for president on October 12, 2015, running under Ang Kapatiran, which has participated in national elections since 2007. However, the certificate was canceled when he was declared a nuisance candidate by the Commission on Elections Second Division on December 9, 2015, and he will not be able to run.

On December 23, 2015, the Comelec en banc disqualified Poe from running as president in the 2016 elections for failing to meet the 10-year residency requirement but she said she would appeal the disqualification to the Supreme Court. The Supreme Court has issued a temporary restraining order preventing the Comelec's decision from being implemented.

== Decision ==
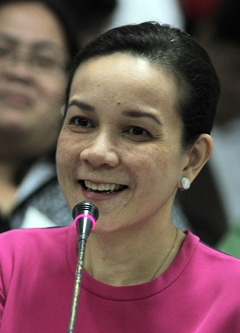
Grace Poe

On November 17, 2015, the Senate Electoral Tribunal dismissed the case by 5–4, with five members opining that Poe could remain in the Senate and the other four opinions agreeing with the petitioner that she was not eligible to do so such as the chairperson, Antonio Carpio, who disagreed with the result. Poe was affirmed to be a natural-born Filipino citizen from the day she renounced her American citizenship on October 20, 2010.

In their judgment for the case, the SET declared that Grace Poe, a foundling, is a "natural-born Filipino", which allowed her to retain her seat in the Philippine Senate.

David filed a motion for reconsideration to reverse the ruling by SET, which was rejected on December 3, 2015, after which he filed an appeal with the Supreme Court. At the court's request, the Office of Solicitor General submitted an opinion on the SET ruling to the Supreme Court on January 4, 2016. The opinion favors the original SET ruling in dismissing David's disqualification case against Poe.

Members	Position	Political Party	Natural born?
Antonio Carpio	Senior Associate Justice	—N/a (Supreme Court)	No
Arturo Brion	Associate Justice	—N/a (Supreme Court)	No
Teresita de Castro	Associate Justice	—N/a (Supreme Court)	No
Bam Aquino	Senator	Liberal	Yes
Nancy Binay	Senator	UNA	No
Pia Cayetano	Senator	Nacionalista	Yes
Loren Legarda	Senator	NPC	Yes
Tito Sotto	Senator	NPC	Yes
Cynthia Villar	Senator	Nacionalista	Yes
