= Sonia Roco =

Filipina educator and civic leader

Chairman of the Aksyon Demokratiko
- In office 2006–2013
- Preceded by: Cho Roco
- Succeeded by: Herminio Aquino

Personal details
- Born: Sonia Cubillo Malasarte; 20 July 1944 (age 82) Tondo, Manila, Commonwealth of the Philippines
- Party: Aksyon Demokratiko (2007–present)
- Other political affiliations: Liberal (2010)
- Spouse: Raul Roco
- Education: Saint Joseph's College of Quezon City (BS); Ateneo de Manila University (MA, MA)
- Occupation: Educator

Sonia Cubillo Malasarte-Roco (born 20 July 1944) is the widow of Filipino senator and presidential candidate Raul Roco. She ran for the Senate in the 2007 Philippine Midterm Elections under her late husband's party, Aksyon Demokratiko, which is allied with the broad opposition coalition called Genuine Opposition. She joined the coalition after JV Ejercito, son of deposed President Joseph Estrada, pulled out as an opposition candidate at his father's behest.

== Early life ==
Sonia Roco was born to then-Congressman Pablo Malasarte of Bilar and homemaker Petra Cubillo of Calape, Bohol. A consistent honor student from elementary to college, she was awarded the "Most Outstanding Student of the Philippines" in 1964, placing first (future husband Raul placed second) among all college students ranked on the basis of academic excellence, leadership ability, and special achievement. Sonia was also a recipient of the Cardinal Santos Leadership Award, having served as president of the Student Catholic Action (SCA) and the National Union of Students of the Philippines (NUSP), a national student organization founded by future Philippine Chief Justice Artemio Panganiban.

Roco holds a Bachelor of Science in Education degree (Magna Cum Laude) from Saint Joseph's College, Quezon City, a Master of Arts in Communication Arts and a Master of Arts in Social Psychology from Ateneo de Manila University. She has also taken courses at the Child Development Center of the University of the Philippines Diliman.

== Career ==
As an educator, Sonia co-founded "Our School," a center for early childhood education at the Ateneo Psychology Department. She also established "Live and Learn Pre-school," a kindergarten school in Katipunan, Quezon City.

As a theater artist, Sonia trained in Speech and Drama in London, England. Upon returning to the Philippines, she taught, acted in, directed, and produced musicals and stage plays.

Sonia ran in the 2007 Philippine general election, coming in 17th place (Genuine Opposition), with 8,457,710 votes. She ran again in the senatorial lineup of the Liberal Party in the 2010 elections. She took 18th place on the electoral result with 6,290,925 votes.

== Personal life ==
As devoted wife to Raul, Sonia actively supported her husband in all his roles as lawyer, congressman, senator, Secretary of Education, presidential candidate, and international parliamentarian. The couple has six children and nine grandchildren. They were bestowed the Golden Parents Award for 1995.

In both 1998 and 2004 Philippine presidential campaign, Sonia actively campaigned for her husband and was described by local media as very well-prepared to be a First Lady of the Philippines. On August 5, 2005, Raul Roco died of prostate cancer.

Following Raul’s passing, Sonia continued to uphold their shared commitment to public service and social advocacy, carrying forward his legacy while remaining a devoted pillar of support for their growing family. Through her ongoing community engagements and civic involvement, she sustained her own distinct public presence, honored by friends, colleagues, and the Filipino people as a graceful symbol of strength, integrity, and dedication to the nation.

== Community involvement ==
Sonia is active in educational, social, cultural, and environmental causes. As past president and founding member of the 20-year-old Women in Nation Building (WIN), she is a sought-after resource person on women's issues. In healthcare, she is a frequent guest speaker owing to her first-hand experience as primary caregiver to then ailing husband Raul. Sonia co-founded Saint Michael's Hospice in 1996 to help the poor and terminally ill. She maintains active relations with the Student Catholic Action Leadership Foundation, an organization which strives to revive the SCA among the contemporary Filipino youth. She is the executive director of Student Catholic Action of the Philippines.

Dr. Patricia Licuanan and Sonia set up the Metro Manila Community Orchestra. With Corazon Alma de Leon and Tony Arevalo, her radio program, “Kapitan del Baryo,” aimed to strengthen grassroots democracy. Since Sonia studied Dramatics in the UK, she later enrolled in the writing class of Barbara Gonzalez, composing series of poems.

== Electoral history ==
Electoral history of Sonia Roco
Year	Office	Party	Votes received				Result
Year	Office	Party	Total	%	P.	Swing	Result
2007	Senator of the Philippines	Aksyon	8,457,748	28.67%	17th	—N/a	Lost
2010	Senator of the Philippines	Liberal	6,774,010	17.16%	18th	-11.51	Lost
