= Eduardo Orpilla =

Filipino politician

Eduardo Fortes "Ed" Orpilla (born January 2, 1948; Agoo, La Union) is a retired former Philippine National Police officer and businessman who previously ran for the Senate under the Kilusang Bagong Lipunan in 2007. He is currently married to Evelyn Refuerzo.
