= Senate Electoral Tribunal =

Electoral tribunal in the Philippines

- Jurisdiction: Philippines
- Location: Sugar Center Building, Quezon City
- Composition method: Designation of the Chief Justice (3 members); Nomination by the Senate (6 members)
- Authorized by: Constitution of the Philippines
- Appeals to: Supreme Court of the Philippines
- Number of positions: 9
- Website: Official website

Chairperson
- Currently: Marvic Leonen

The Senate Electoral Tribunal (SET) is an electoral tribunal that decides election protests in the Senate of the Philippines. It consists of 6 senators nominated by the Senate, and 3 justices of the Supreme Court of the Philippines, who are designated by the Chief Justice. The equivalent tribunals for elections to the lower house is the House of Representatives Electoral Tribunal and to president and vice presidents is Presidential Electoral Tribunal.

The SET is located at SET-HRET Building, Commission on Audit Compound, Quezon City.

Members of the Tribunal receive a monthly allowance of 100,000 Philippine pesos on top of their regular salary.

== History ==
In the 1935 constitution, there were nine members, with three designated by the Chief Justice, three by the largest party in the Senate, and another three from second-largest party. In Tañada and Macapagal v. Cuenco, et al., the Supreme Court ruled that the Senate may not elect members who have not been nominated by the parties specified in the constitution. This was after the Nacionalista Party moved to include 2 more of its members in 1956 after Lorenzo Tañada, the sole senator not a member of the Nacionalista Party, nominated only himself.

In the 1987 constitution, there were still nine members, but the six senators were now based via proportional representation from the political parties therein.

== Membership ==
The chairperson of the SET is always the most senior justice of the Supreme Court that's sitting in the tribunal.

The three members from the Supreme Court are designated by the chief justice. While there's no regular occurrence on when a chief justice designates members, this is almost certainly done when there is a new justice of the Supreme Court.

The six members from the Senate are named in a resolution of the Senate. This always happens at the organization of the chamber at the start of every new Congress.

These are the members in the 20th Congress.

20th Congress (July 28, 2025 – June 30, 2028)
Members	Party	Membership
Marvic Leonen	Nonpartisan	Supreme Court associate justice (Chairperson)
Ramon Paul Hernando	Nonpartisan	Supreme Court associate justice
Henri Jean Paul Inting	Nonpartisan	Supreme Court associate justice
Pia Cayetano	Nacionalista	Senator from the minority bloc
Kiko Pangilinan	Liberal	Senator from the majority bloc
Bam Aquino	KANP	Senator from the majority bloc
Camille Villar	Nacionalista	Senator from the minority bloc
Alan Peter Cayetano	Independent	Senator from the minority bloc
Robin Padilla	PDP	Senator from the minority bloc

=== Former senator members ===
Congress (July 1, 1987 – June 30, 2019)
Member	Political party	Term of Senators
Joel Villanueva	CIBAC	July 1, 2017 – June 30, 2019
Grace Poe	Independent	August 10, 2016 – June 30, 2019
Antonio Trillanes	Nacionalista	August 10, 2016 – June 30, 2019
Cynthia Villar	Nacionalista	August 10, 2016 – June 30, 2017
Loren Legarda	NPC	July 1, 1998 – June 30, 2001; July 1, 2014 – August 10, 2016
Bam Aquino	Liberal	July 1, 2013 – August 10, 2016
Tito Sotto	NPC	July 1, 2001 – June 30, 2004; July 1, 2013 – August 10, 2016
Pia Cayetano	Nacionalista	July 1, 2007 – June 30, 2016
Sonny Angara	LDP	July 1, 2013 – June 30, 2014
Francis Pangilinan	Liberal	July 1, 2001 – June 30, 2004; July 1, 2010 – June 30, 2013
Bong Revilla	Lakas	July 1, 2004 – June 30, 2007; July 1, 2010 – June 30, 2013
Gregorio Honasan	UNA	July 1, 2010 – June 30, 2013
Lito Lapid	Lakas	July 1, 2010 – June 30, 2013
Edgardo Angara	LDP	July 1, 2007 – June 30, 2010
Francis Escudero	Independent	July 1, 2007 – June 30, 2010
Benigno Aquino III	Liberal	July 1, 2007 – June 30, 2010
Panfilo Lacson	Independent	July 1, 2007 – June 30, 2010
Manuel Villar	Nacionalista	July 1, 2004 – June 30, 2007
Loi Ejercito	PMP	October 16, 2005 – June 30, 2007
Jinggoy Estrada	PMP	July 1, 2004 – October 15, 2005
Ramon Magsaysay, Jr.	Liberal	July 1, 2004 – June 30, 2007
Aquilino Pimentel, Jr.	PDP–Laban	July 1, 2001 – June 30, 2007
Juan Flavier	Lakas	July 1, 2001 – June 30, 2007
Rodolfo Biazon	Liberal	July 1, 2001 – June 30, 2004
Ramon Revilla,	Lakas	July 1, 1998 – June 30, 2001
John Henry Osmeña	NPC	July 1, 1998 – June 30, 2001
Robert Jaworski	Lakas	July 1, 1998 – June 30, 2001
Raul Roco	Aksyon	July 1, 1995 – June 30, 1998
Blas Ople	LAMMP	July 1, 1995 – June 30, 1998
Alberto Romulo	LDP	July 1, 1995 – June 30, 1998
Miriam Defensor Santiago	PRP	July 1, 1995 – June 30, 1998
Gloria Macapagal Arroyo	Lakas	July 1, 1995 – June 30, 1998
Francisco Tatad	PRP	July 1, 1992 – June 30, 1995
Nikki Coseteng	LDP	July 1, 1992 – June 30, 1995
Leticia Ramos-Shahani	Lakas	July 1, 1992 – June 30, 1995
Freddie Webb	LDP	July 1, 1992 – June 30, 1995
Juan Ponce Enrile	PMP	July 1, 1988 – June 30, 1992
Teofisto Guingona	Liberal	July 1, 1987 – June 30, 1995
Neptali A. Gonzales	LDP	July 1, 1987 – June 30, 1992
Jose D. Lina, Jr.	LDP	July 1, 1987 – June 30, 1992
Joseph Estrada	PMP	July 1, 1987 – June 30, 1988
Mamintal A.J. Tamano	Nacionalista	July 1, 1987 – June 30, 1992
Victor San Andres Ziga	Liberal	July 1, 1987 – June 30, 1992

== Cases ==
Most cases, such as the Pimentel v. Zubiri case, are election protests, and most are usually resolved when the protestant (the losing candidate) runs on another election; at this point, the tribunal will rule that they have abandoned the case.

A few, such as the David v. Poe case, are quo warranto petitions, or questioning if the winner is actually qualified to be a senator.

Successful cases:

- Romero v. Sanidad (1946)
- Rodriguez v. Tan (1947)
- Recto v. de Vera (1949)
- Pimentel v. Zubiri (2007)
  - Tribunal granted the petition in 2011, declaring Koko Pimentel as duly-elected senator.

Failed cases (since 2000):

- Enrile vs. Recto et al. (2001)
  - Enrile withdrew the protest in 2002.
- Osmeña vs. Biazon, et al. (2004)
  - Osmeña withdrew the protest in 2006.
- David v. Poe (2015)
  - Dismissed the petition in 2015; the Supreme Court then upheld the decision of the SET in 2016
- Tolentino v. de Lima (2016)
  - Tolentino withdrew the protest in 2018.
- Mansilungan v. Pimentel and Adan v. Pimentel (2019)
  - Dismissed due to lack of merit in 2020.

== Seat ==
The tribunal was formerly found in the SET-HRET Building, Commission on Audit Compound in Quezon City. However, that building was condemned, and the SET was transferred to the Philippine International Convention Center in Pasay. It has then transferred to the Sugar Center Building that houses the Sugar Regulatory Administration in Quezon City.
