= United Opposition (Philippines) =

Defunct political party in the Philippines

United Opposition (UNO) Nagkakaisang Oposisyon
- Leader: Jejomar Binay
- President: Jejomar Binay
- Chairman: Joseph Estrada
- Spokesperson: Ernesto Maceda
- Secretary-General: Ernesto Maceda
- Founded: 2005
- Dissolved: 2010
- Preceded by: Koalisyon ng Nagkakaisang Pilipino
- Succeeded by: United Nationalist Alliance
- Headquarters: Makati
- Ideology: Populism
- Political position: Big tent
- Colors: Blue, Red, White

The United Opposition was a political party in the Philippines. It called itself the "Genuine Opposition" coalition throughout the duration of the 2007 midterm elections.

== History ==
=== Formation ===
The United Opposition party was created by Makati Mayor Jejomar Binay in June 2005 to unite all politicians who wished to impeach Philippine President Gloria Macapagal Arroyo after the revelation of her election cheating scandal. Arroyo stated via her presidential spokesperson that the formation of the party will not be interrupted, as it was a right of the opposition itself. The year of the formation also the year where the Supreme Court dismissed the election protest filed by Fernando Poe Jr.'s wife Susan Roces about the cheating scandal.

The first meeting of UNO started in July 2005, with Binay as its leader, former Poe's campaign spokesman and House Minority Leader Chiz Escudero as its secretary general. Escudero stated that the opposition will be stronger. Binay and UNO also blasted Arroyo in August 2005 of confusing the people about the cheating scandal.

The UNO started scouting candidates for the Senate as early as October 2006 to claim a large share of the Senate seats. In January 2007, UNO started short-listing its nominees after a large number of interested personalities wanted to join the opposition.

=== Genuine Opposition ===
The UNO changed its name on February 12, 2007, at the Club Filipino in San Juan, Metro Manila to "Grand and Broad Coalition" (GBC). On February 15, 2007, the group changed its name again to Genuine Opposition (GO) after a meeting with Senate President Manny Villar in his office in Las Piñas. GO became the opposition coalition with eight parties under its wing, including its predecessor, UNO. Though Senate President Manny Villar and Senate Majority Leader Francis Pangilinan are running under the Opposition, they remain independent candidates as in the 2001 election. On February 28, 2007, Genuine Opposition dropped Francis Pangilinan as its adopted candidate.

=== Post-2007 election ===
On January 23, 2008, former Senate President Ernesto Maceda, chairman emeritus of UNO announced that United Opposition spokesman Adel Tamano, former Cavite congressman Gilbert Remulla, incumbent Bukidnon congressman Teofisto Guingona III, incumbent Senators Jose "Jinggoy" Estrada and Maria Ana Consuelo "Jamby" Madrigal-Valade are the 2010 senatorial bets of the opposition and "vice presidential materials.”

== Election results ==
=== Legislative elections ===
House election	House Seats won	Result	Senate election	Senate Seats won	Ticket	Result
2007 (Note: Only who stood up as UNO in the ballot)	0 / 270	Lakas plurarity	2007	2 / 12	GO	GO win 7/12 seats

== See also ==
- Koalisyon ng Nagkakaisang Pilipino, their predecessor from 2003 to 2004
- Genuine Opposition, the coalition which UNO is belong in 2007
- United Nationalist Alliance, UNO's successor after 2013
- Pwersa ng Masang Pilipino, Estrada's other party affiliation
- PDP–Laban, Binay's other party affiliation
