= TEAM Unity =

Electoral alliance in the Philippines that contested the 2007 elections

- Leader: Gloria Macapagal Arroyo
- Founded: 2007
- Dissolved: c. before 2010
- Preceded by: K4
- Succeeded by: Lakas–Kampi
- Political parties: Lakas; KAMPI; NPC (Teodoro wing); Liberal (Atienza wing); LDP; PDSP; PDP–Laban (Duterte wing); PMP (Ungab wing)

TEAM Unity (acronym of Together Everybody Achieves More) was an electoral alliance in the Philippines that contested the 2007 Philippine general election. Its candidates were supporters of President Gloria Macapagal Arroyo and her administration. The alliance sought to win several Senate and House seats to protect Arroyo from impeachment attempts. Politicians who opposed the Arroyo administration formed their own electoral alliance, Genuine Opposition (GO), to challenge TEAM Unity.

In the Senate election, TEAM Unity won only two of the 12 contested seats. In 2011, due to an electoral protest, TEAM Unity's Senator Migz Zubiri lost his seat to GO's Koko Pimentel. TEAM Unity was more successful in the House elections, winning 142 out of 218 district seats.

== Program ==
TEAM Unity's main program for Filipinos, referenced in its slogan, was "Our priority agenda is to work for the future of our children."

== Slogan ==
The coalition's slogan for the election was "MaS PARA SA KiDZ Mo" (lit. 'More for Your Kids'). It was devised by President Gloria Macapagal Arroyo during the Lakas–CMD National Convention on April 12, 2007. It is an acronym of the candidates' names, with Ma standing for Magsaysay, S standing for Singson, P standing for Pichay, A standing for Angara, R standing for Recto, A standing for Arroyo, S standing for Sotto, A standing for Aquino-Oreta, Ki standing for Kiram, D standing for Defensor, Z standing for Zubiri, and Mo standing for Montano.

Their secondary slogan was "Tulong Tulong sa Pagsulong" (lit. 'Working Together for Progress').

== Coalition members ==
=== Mainstream party members ===
- Lakas–CMD
- Kabalikat ng Malayang Pilipino (KAMPI)
- Nationalist People's Coalition (NPC-Teodoro wing)
- Liberal (Atienza wing)
- Laban ng Demokratikong Pilipino (LDP)
- Partido Demokratiko Sosyalista ng Pilipinas (PDSP)
- PDP–Laban (Duterte wing)
- PMP (Ungab wing)

== Senatorial slate ==
Name	Party	Occupation	Elected
Edgardo Angara	LDP	Senator and the former President of the Senate (1993–1995)	Yes
Joker Arroyo	KAMPI	Senator and former Representative from Makati (1992–2001). He is also the former prosecutor of the impeachment trial of Pres. Joseph Estrada.	Yes
Mike Defensor	Lakas	former Presidential Chief of Staff (2006–2007), Former Representative from Quezon City (1995–1998), and Environment and Natural Resources Secretary	No
Jamalul Kiram III	PDSP	Sultan of Sulu (1986–2013)	No
Vicente Magsaysay	Lakas	Governor of Zambales (1967–1978; 1980–1986; 1998–2007)	No
Cesar Montano	Lakas	Television and movie personality or actor and UNESCO Commissioner	No
Tessie Aquino-Oreta	NPC	former senator (1998–2004) and former Representative of Malabon–Navotas (1987–1998)	No
Prospero Pichay Jr.	Lakas	Representative from Surigao del Sur (1998–2007)	No
Ralph Recto	Lakas	Senator, and former Representative from Batangas (1992–2001).	No
Chavit Singson	Lakas	Governor of Ilocos Sur (1971–1972; 1980–1986; 1992–2001; 2004–2007)	No
Tito Sotto	NPC	former senator (1992–2004), former Vice Mayor of Quezon City (1986–1992).	No
Juan Miguel Zubiri	Lakas	Representative from Bukidnon (1998–2007)	No

== Campaign team ==
- Reli German – Campaign Manager
- Tourism Secretary Joseph Ace Durano – Spokesperson
- Tonypet Albano – Deputy Spokesperson
- Ben Evardone – Media Director

== Party jingle ==
TEAM Unity's jingle, used in their early promotional campaign, originated from the song "We Will Rock You".

== Election results ==
2 out of 12 candidates won the possible 12 seats in the Senate, namely: (in order of votes received)

- Edgardo Angara
- Joker Arroyo

== See also ==
- UniTeam, an electoral alliance of Bongbong Marcos and Sara Duterte in the 2022 Philippine elections
- Koalisyon ng Katapatan at Karanasan sa Kinabukasan (K-4), the name of the pro-Arroyo coalition in the 2004 elections.
- People Power Coalition, the name of pro-Arroyo coalition in the 2001 midterm elections.
- Lakas NUCD 1998 Senatorial Slate, the Ramos' administration's senatorial slate during the 1998 national elections
- Lakas–Laban Coalition, the name of the pro-Ramos coalition in the 1995 midterm elections.
- Genuine Opposition, TEAM Unity's rival coalition in the 2007 elections.
- Team PNoy
