= 2007 Philippine Senate election =

29th Philippine senatorial election

- May 14, 2007

12 (of the 24) seats in the Senate of the Philippines 13 seats needed for a majority
Alliance	GO	TEAM Unity
Seats won	7 (8 after 2011)	3 (2 after 2011)
Popular vote	136,888,165	98,927,031
Percentage	50.87	36.76
Alliance	Liberal	Independent
Seats won	1	1
Popular vote	14,534,678	14,331,195
Percentage	5.40	5.33
Senate President before election
Manny Villar
Nacionalista
Elected Senate President
Manny Villar
Nacionalista

The 29th election of members to the Senate of the Philippines was held on Monday, May 14, 2007, to elect 12 of the 24 seats in the Senate. The winners in this election joined the winners of the 2004 election to form the 14th Congress of the Philippines. The senators elected in 2004 will serve until June 30, 2010, while the senators elected in this election will serve up to June 30, 2013. The elections to the House of Representatives as well as local elections occurred on the same date. The Philippines uses plurality-at-large voting for seats in the Senate.

In the election, the opposition-backed alliance called the Genuine Opposition (GO) defeated the administration-led alliance TEAM Unity by winning seven of the twelve seats in the Senate. For the first time in Philippine history, a detainee, Antonio Trillanes was elected unprecedently as a senator while being withheld for mutiny and rebellion charges. Almost all of the incumbents running for reelection won except for Ralph Recto who was at fourteenth place.

An electoral protest of GO's Koko Pimentel, the 13th placed candidate, against TEAM Unity's Migz Zubiri, the 12th place candidate, resulted in Zubiri's resignation in the Senate, and the Senate Electoral Tribunal's decision to replace Pimentel with Zubiri. This led to GO winning 8 seats, the biggest win by the opposition in the Senate election history since 1951, notwithstanding 2 other opposition candidates won, and only 2 administration candidates won.

== Electoral system ==
Philippine Senate elections are via plurality block voting, with the entire country as an at-large "district". Each voter has 12 votes, and can vote for up to 12 candidates. Seats up were the seats last contested in 2001.

== Background ==
=== COMELEC issues ===
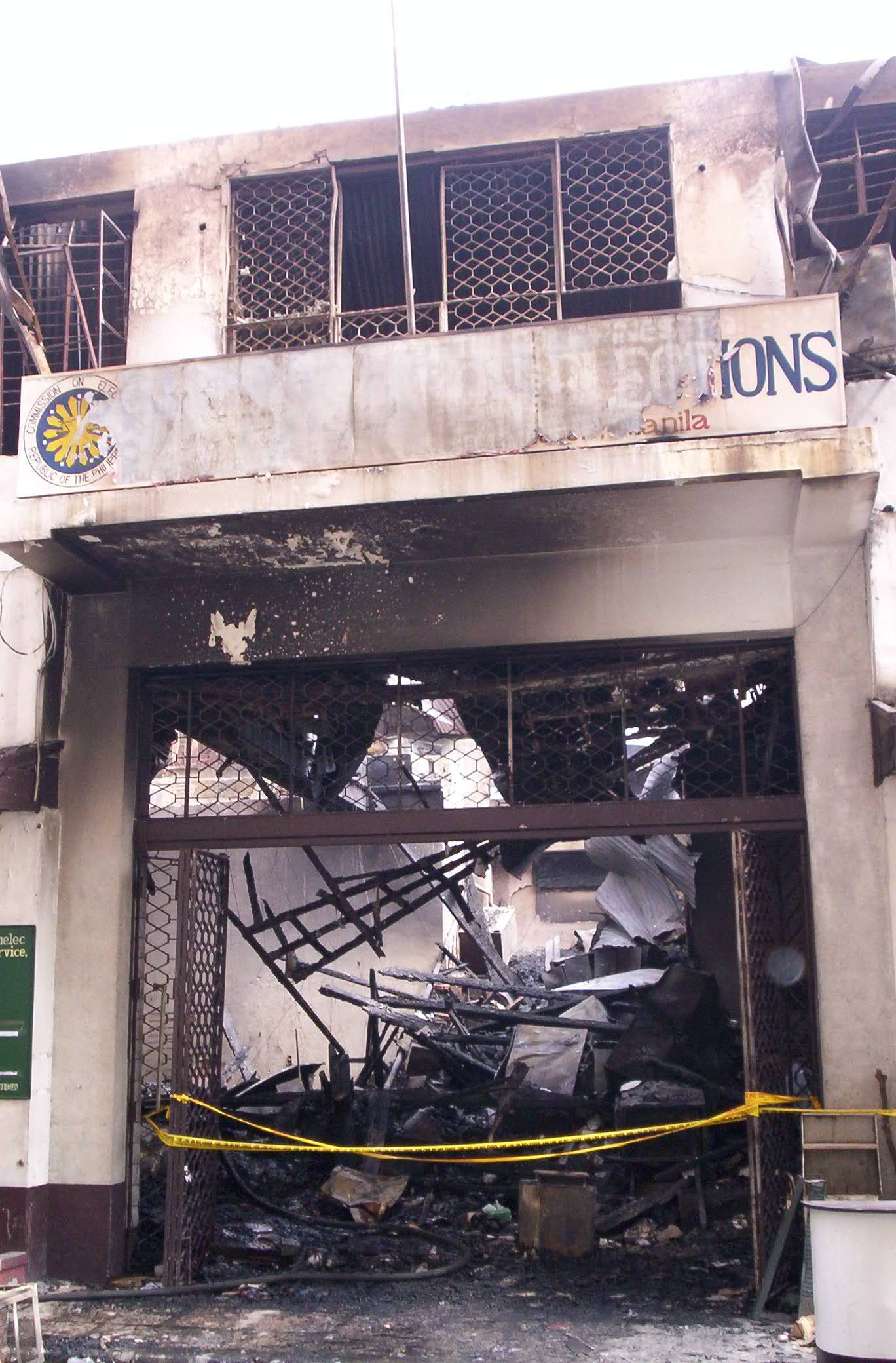
The Old COMELEC Building after being razed by fire on March 11, 2007.

On March 11, 2007, the Old COMELEC Building in Intramuros, Manila was burned by a blazing fire ruining several ballot boxes and pending election protests. The Genuine Opposition considered the fire as political act which ended in burning of several election protests and contested ballot boxes. Investigators found out that instead of arson, it was the generator of the building which caused and since the building was built with tar and wood it would easily razed by fire. The Commission on Elections (COMELEC) faced scrutiny because of the fire that hit its old building on March 11 resulting in speculations of conspiracies to cheat on the May 14 elections. The COMELEC was also lambasted for publishing on the internet the names, addresses and details of registered voters.

=== The Aquino issue ===
Three people with the name Aquino filed their candidacies (Benigno Aquino III, Tessie Aquino-Oreta and Theodore Aquino), and there was confusion as to who is credited with a vote if someone wrote only "Aquino" on the ballot. Since Theodore Aquino was disqualified because he had dual citizenship and former Sen. Tessie Aquino-Oreta has the last name Oreta, COMELEC ruled that all votes with only the name Aquino would go to Tarlac Rep. Benigno Aquino III. All three Aquinos are related to each other.

=== The Cayetano issue ===
In a case identical to the Aquino issue, representative Alan Peter Cayetano (Taguig-Pateros) found out that a certain Joselito Cayetano belonging to the Kilusang Bagong Lipunan (KBL) filed his candidacy with the nickname "Peter" which was really "Jojo". Alan therefore filed a disqualification case (SPA 07-019) against Jojo. Jojo was declared a nuisance candidate by the COMELEC resolution on March 27, 2007.

Jojo then filed for a motion for reconsideration which was eventually rejected on May 11, 2007, but COMELEC did not remove his name from the Official List of Senatorial Candidates and ruled on May 12, 2007, that all votes with only the name "CAYETANO" will be treated as stray votes (discarded) and therefore not counted to either the candidates until Supreme Court resolved the matter. The COMELEC said that Jojo could file a motion for reconsideration at the Supreme Court within five days.

== Coalitions and party groupings ==
=== TEAM Unity ===
TEAM (Together Everyone Achieves More) Unity was the administration-backed coalition composed mostly of supporters and erstwhile critics of then-President Gloria Macapagal Arroyo. TEAM Unity sought to take several Senate seats in order to ensure the passage of President Arroyo's legislative programs and also to protect her from any impeachment attempts by the political opposition after the midterm elections. This coalition is composed by different major political parties including Lakas—Christian Muslim Democrats, Kabalikat ng Malayang Pilipino, Nationalist People's Coalition, Laban ng Demokratikong Pilipino, and Partido Demokratiko Sosyalista ng Pilipinas. The coalition's campaign team was headed by veteran political strategist Reli German as campaign manager, together with Tourism Secretary Ace Durano as spokesperson and Ike Rodriguez as campaign director. TEAM Unity held their proclamation rally at the Cebu Coliseum on February 17, 2007.

=== Genuine Opposition ===
Genuine Opposition (GO) was the main opposition-backed coalition of the parties' senatorial line-up for the elections, which was in opposition to President Arroyo. It was originally called the "United Opposition" (UNO), created by opposition stalwart and Makati Mayor Jejomar Binay in June 2005 to unite all politicians who sought to impeach President Arroyo. UNO then reorganized itself and changed its name to Grand and Broad Coalition (GBC), with the UNO party under that coalition. On February 15, 2007, the group changed its name again to Genuine Opposition after a meeting with Senate President Manny Villar in his office in Las Piñas.

== Endorsements ==
Iglesia ni Cristo, a religion typically known for being courted for its block voting, endorsed 6 TEAM Unity (TU) members (Ralph Recto, Joker Arroyo, Ed Angara, Mike Defensor, Juan Miguel "Migz" Zubiri, and Tito Sotto), Five Genuine Opposition (GO) senatorial bets (Loren Legarda, Manny Villar, Panfilo Lacson, Chiz Escudero, and Noynoy Aquino III), with one independent (Kiko Pangilinan). Bayan Muna endorsed Legarda, Escudero, Cayetano, Pimentel, Roco, Coseteng, and Villar from GO; Arroyo and Recto of TU; and independent Pangilinan.

== Campaign ==
Candidates made use of different campaign platforms to win. Prospero Pichay Jr., Manny Villar, Mike Defensor, and Loren Legarda had been very visible in TV ads. Francis Pangilinan preferred to run as an independent and decided not to participate in sorties and campaign of the Genuine Opposition, even though he was initially drafted as a guest candidate. Teresa Aquino-Oreta had raised different reactions in her TV ad campaign asking the people's forgiveness being the “dancing queen” during the impeachment of deposed President Joseph Estrada. Some candidates like Francis Escudero, Vicente Magsaysay, Francis Pangilinan, Joker Arroyo, Antonio Trillanes and Koko Pimentel made use of the internet by joining networks sites like Friendster; making or updating Wikipedia entries, establishing blogs and websites and airing the commercials on YouTube.

== Candidates ==
On March 19, 2007, COMELEC released Resolution No.7832 which finalized and approved the official candidates for the senatorial election. On March 29, 2007, COMELEC certified 37 Senatorial Candidates.

=== Administration coalition ===
TEAM Unity ticket
Edgardo Angara	LDP
Joker Arroyo	KAMPI
Mike Defensor	Lakas
Jamalul Kiram III	PDSP
Vicente Magsaysay	Lakas
Cesar Montano	Lakas
Tessie Aquino-Oreta	NPC
Prospero Pichay Jr.	Lakas
Ralph Recto	Lakas
Chavit Singson	Lakas
Tito Sotto	NPC
Juan Miguel Zubiri	Lakas

=== Primary opposition coalition ===
Genuine Opposition ticket
Benigno Aquino III	Liberal
Alan Peter Cayetano	Nacionalista
Nikki Coseteng	Independent
Francis Escudero	NPC
Panfilo Lacson	UNO
Loren Legarda	NPC
John Henry Osmeña	UNO
Koko Pimentel	PDP–Laban
Sonia Roco	Aksyon
Antonio Trillanes	UNO
Manny Villar	Nacionalista

=== Other tickets ===
Ang Kapatiran ticket
Martin Bautista	Ang Kapatiran
Adrian Sison	Ang Kapatiran
Zosimo Jesus Paredes II	Ang Kapatiran

Kilusang Bagong Lipunan ticket
Melchor Chavez	KBL
Joselito Pepito Cayetano	KBL
Ruben Enciso	KBL
Antonio Estrella	KBL
Oliver Lozano	KBL
Eduardo Orpilla	KBL
Victor Wood	KBL

Other candidates
Felix Cantal	PGRP
Richard Gomez	Independent
Gregorio Honasan	Independent
Kiko Pangilinan	Liberal

== Retiring and term-limited incumbents ==
At this point in time, two senators are voluntarily retiring from the Senate at the end of their current term. As well four senators are term-limited by the Constitution of the Philippines after serving two consecutive terms. There was one vacancy left in the outgoing Senate as Noli de Castro (Independent) was elected as vice-president in 2004.

1. Franklin Drilon (Liberal), term-limited in 2007, ran in 2010 and won
2. Loi Ejercito (PMP), retiring from politics
3. Juan Flavier (Lakas), retiring from politics
4. Alfredo Lim (PMP), ran for Mayor of Manila and won
5. Ramon Magsaysay Jr. (Lakas), term-limited in 2007, ran in 2013 and lost
6. Serge Osmeña (PDP–Laban), term-limited in 2007 and campaigned for the Genuine Opposition, ran in 2010 and won

== Opinion polls ==
Opinion polling (locally known as "surveys") is carried out by two major polling firms: Social Weather Stations (SWS), and Pulse Asia, with a handful of minor polling firms. A typical poll asks a voter to name twelve persons one would vote for in the senate election.

=== Winning candidates ===
Pollster		Pulse Asia	SWS	Pulse Asia	SWS	Pulse Asia	SWS	SWS
Date(s) administered		January 25–28, 2007	February 22–27, 2007	February 26–March 5, 2007	March 15–18, 2007	April 3–5, 2007	April 14–17, 2007	May 2–4, 2007
Sample size		1,200	1,200	1,200	1,200	1,200	1,200	1,200
Margin of error		±3.0%	±3.0%	±3.0%	±3.0%	±3.0%	±3.0%	±3.0%
Candidates (Party; ticket)	1	Legarda (NPC; GO), 46.6%	Pangilinan (LP; Ind), 57%	Legarda (NPC; GO), 56.8%	Legarda (NPC; GO), 58%	Legarda (NPC; GO), 56.8%	Legarda (NPC; GO), 58%	Legarda (NPC; GO), 59%
Candidates (Party; ticket)	2	Lacson (UNO; GO), 34.6% Pangilinan (LP; Ind), 34.6%	Legarda (NPC; GO), 54%	Lacson (UNO; GO), 41.1%	Villar (NP; GO), 57%	Escudero (NPC; GO), 47.2%	Villar (NP; GO), 45%	Villar (NP; GO), 46%
Candidates (Party; ticket)	3	Lacson (UNO; GO), 34.6% Pangilinan (LP; Ind), 34.6%	Villar (NP; GO), 52%	Pangilinan (LP; Ind), 39.4%	Pangilinan (LP; Ind), 48%	Villar (NP; GO), 47.0%	Escudero (NPC; GO), 41% Lacson (UNO; GO), 41%	Escudero (NPC; GO), 43%
Candidates (Party; ticket)	4	Cayetano (NP; GO), 31.7%	Cayetano (NP; GO), 43%	Escudero (NPC; GO), 35.5%	Lacson (UNO; GO), 42%	Lacson (UNO; GO), 43.9%	Escudero (NPC; GO), 41% Lacson (UNO; GO), 41%	Pangilinan (LP; Ind), 41%
Candidates (Party; ticket)	5	Sotto (NPC; TU), 28.8%	Lacson (UNO; GO), 42%	Recto (Lakas; TU), 35.2%	Escudero (NPC; GO), 40%	Pangilinan (LP; Ind), 38.8%	Pangilinan (LP; Ind), 39%	Lacson (UNO; GO), 39%
Candidates (Party; ticket)	6	Villar (NP; GO), 26.4%	Recto (Lakas; TU), 37%	Villar (NP; GO), 35.0%	Cayetano (NP; GO), 39%	Cayetano (NP; GO), 38.2%	Recto (Lakas; TU), 36%	Recto (Lakas; TU), 36% Aquino (LP; GO), 36%
Candidates (Party; ticket)	7	Recto (Lakas; TU), 26.0%	Escudero (NPC; GO), 36%	Arroyo (KAMPI; TU), 34.5%	Recto (Lakas; TU), 37%	Honasan (Ind; Ind), 35.7%	Angara (LDP; TU), 35%	Recto (Lakas; TU), 36% Aquino (LP; GO), 36%
Candidates (Party; ticket)	8	Arroyo (KAMPI; TU), 25.8%	Sotto (NPC; TU), 31%	Aquino (LP; GO), 34.2%	Angara (LDP; TU), 32%	Aquino (LP; GO), 35.5%	Arroyo (KAMPI; TU), 32%	Cayetano (NP; GO), 34%
Candidates (Party; ticket)	9	Ejercito (PMP; GO), 25.7%	Aquino (LP; GO), 30% Osmeña (UNO; GO), 30%	Angara (LDP; TU), 32.1%	Honasan (Ind; Ind), 29%	Recto (Lakas; TU), 35.4%	Cayetano (NP; GO), 31%	Honasan (Ind; Ind), 32% Zubiri (Lakas; TU), 32%
Candidates (Party; ticket)	10	Pimentel (PDP Laban; GO), 24.4%	Aquino (LP; GO), 30% Osmeña (UNO; GO), 30%	Cayetano (NP; GO), 30.9%	Aquino (LP; GO), 28% Arroyo (KAMPI; TU), 28%	Angara (LDP; TU), 35.2%	Sotto (NPC; TU), 30%	Honasan (Ind; Ind), 32% Zubiri (Lakas; TU), 32%
Candidates (Party; ticket)	11	Angara (LDP; TU), 24.0%	Arroyo (KAMPI; TU), 29%	Honasan (Ind; Ind), 27.3%	Aquino (LP; GO), 28% Arroyo (KAMPI; TU), 28%	Arroyo (KAMPI; TU), 33.4%	Honasan (Ind; Ind), 28% Aquino (LP; GO), 28% Pimentel (PDP Laban; GO), 28%	Arroyo (KAMPI; TU), 31% Angara (LDP; TU), 31%
Candidates (Party; ticket)	12	Honasan (Ind; Ind), 23.3%	Honasan (Ind; Ind), 28%	Sotto (NPC; TU), 25.4%	Sotto (NPC; TU), 26% Osmeña (UNO; GO), 26%	Zubiri (Lakas; TU), 32.0%	Honasan (Ind; Ind), 28% Aquino (LP; GO), 28% Pimentel (PDP Laban; GO), 28%	Arroyo (KAMPI; TU), 31% Angara (LDP; TU), 31%
Candidates (Party; ticket)	13	Escudero (NPC; GO), 23.2%	Pimentel (PDP Laban; GO), 27% Angara (LDP; TU), 27%	Pimentel (PDP Laban; GO), 23.1%	Sotto (NPC; TU), 26% Osmeña (UNO; GO), 26%	Pimentel (PDP Laban; GO), 30.1%	Honasan (Ind; Ind), 28% Aquino (LP; GO), 28% Pimentel (PDP Laban; GO), 28%	Sotto (NPC; TU), 26%
Candidates (Party; ticket)	14	Aquino (LP; GO), 22.5%	Pimentel (PDP Laban; GO), 27% Angara (LDP; TU), 27%	Magsaysay (Lakas; TU), 22.4%	Pimentel (PDP Laban; GO), 25%	Sotto (NPC; TU), 29.2%	Zubiri (Lakas; TU), 25%	Pimentel (PDP Laban; GO), 25%
Candidates (Party; ticket)	15	Osmeña (UNO; GO), 17.9%	Defensor (Lakas; TU), 21%	Roco (Aksyon; GO), 22.4%	Defensor (Lakas; TU), 21%	Roco (Aksyon; GO), 23%	Roco (Aksyon; GO), 27.1%	Defensor (Lakas; TU), 24% Trillanes (UNO; GO), 24%
None Refused Undecided		12.2%	14%	10%	10.6%	8.8%	12%	13%

=== Composition ===
Candidates who were not make it to the top 12, but were within the margin of error from the 12th-placed candidate, are denoted by figures inside the parenthesis.

Pollster	Date(s) administered	Sample size	Margin of error	Parties									Coalitions		
Pollster	Date(s) administered	Sample size	Margin of error	KAMPI	Lakas	LDP	LP	NP	NPC	PDP Laban	UNO	Ind	GO	Ind	TEAM Unity
SWS	May 2–4, 2007	1,200	±3.0%	1	2	1	2	2	2	1	1	1	6	2	4
SWS	Apr 14–17, 2007	1,200	±3.0%	1	1(+1)	1	2	2	3	1	1	1	6(+1)	2	4(+1)
Pulse Asia	Apr 3–5, 2007	1,200	±3.0%	1	2	1	2	2	3	0(+1)	2	1	7(+1)	2	4
SWS	Mar 15–18, 2007	1,200	±3.0%	1	1	1	2	2	3	0(+1)	1(+1)	1	6(+1)	2	5
Pulse Asia	Feb 26–Mar 5, 2007	1,200	±3.0%	1	1(+1)	1	2	2	3	0(+1)	1	1	6(+2)	2	4(+1)
SWS	Feb 22–27, 2007	1,200	±3.0%	1	1	0(+1)	2	2	3	0(+1)	2	1	6(+1)	2	4(+1)
Pulse Asia	Jan 25–28, 2007	1,200	±3.0%	1	1	1	1(+1)	2	2(+1)	1	1	1	5(+2)	2	4

== Results ==
The Genuine Opposition (GO) originally won seven seats, TEAM Unity won three seats, a Liberal Party candidate not in any slate won one, and an independent won one.

Five incumbents successfully defended their seats: Edgardo Angara and Joker Arroyo for TEAM Unity, Panfilo Lacson and Manny Villar from GO, and Francis Pangilinan of the Liberal Party.

GO's Benigno Aquino III, Alan Peter Cayetano, Francis Escudero, Antonio Trillanes, and TEAM Unity's Migz Zubiri are the neophyte senators.

Returning are independent candidate Gregorio Honasan, and Loren Legarda from GO.

TEAM Unity's Ralph Recto was the sole incumbent defeated.

Migz Zubiri's seat would later be awarded to Koko Pimentel of GO in 2011 when the latter won an election protest against the former.

The election of Alfredo Lim as Mayor of Manila in concurrent elections means that his Senate seat will be vacant until June 30, 2010.

	1	2	3	4	5	6	7	8	9	10	11	12	13	14	15	16	17	18	19	20	21	22	23	24
Before election					+	+	+	‡	‡	‡	‡	‡^	‡	‡	‡	‡								
Election result	Not up				LP	GO							Ind	TEAM Unity			Not up							
After election					*	+	√	*	√	*	+	√	+	√	*	+								^
Senate bloc	Minority bloc								Majority bloc															

Key:

- ‡ Seats up
- + Gained by a party from another party
- √ Held by the incumbent
- * Held by the same party with a new senator
- ^ Vacancy

=== Pimentel vs. Zubiri electoral protest ===
The 12th Senate seat was contested between TEAM Unity's Migz Zubiri and GO's Koko Pimentel Zubiri was proclaimed In July 2007 with a margin of about 20,000 votes, but Pimentel filed an electoral protest to the Senate Electoral Tribunal (SET), which the tribunal accepted, alleging there was massive electoral fraud in Maguindanao. After the revision of votes on Pimentel's protest in July 2009, he released a statement that he now leads Zubiri by 96,000 votes; Zubiri countered that his counter-protest that alleges similar fraud in Mega Manila has him leading by around 132,000 votes in areas affected by his counter protest.

In July 2011, suspended Autonomous Region in Muslim Mindanao (ARMM) governor Zaldy Ampatuan and Maguindanao election supervisor Lintang Bedol alleged that there was indeed fraud in the ARMM in favor of TEAM Unity. On August 3, 2011, Zubiri resigned, maintaining that he had no hand in alleged electoral fraud in the ARMM. He withdrew his counter-protest, which led to the SET to proclaim Pimentel as the winner on August 11, 2011. Pimentel took his oath at Mati, Davao Oriental, where he had the highest rank among the provinces, finishing in second place.

Pimentel sued former president Gloria Macapagal Arroyo, COMELEC chairman Benjamin Abalos, Maguinadanao elections supervisor Lintang Bedol and others for electoral sabotage on August 17, 2011, at the Department of Justice (DOJ). A joint DOJ-COMELEC panel began investigations on Pimentel's suit by November 3. On November 18, 2011, the commission voted to file charges against Arroyo and others at the Pasay Regional Trial Court, which later ordered Arroyo, Abalos and Bedol arrested later in the day.

In the tables below, it shows Zubiri winning, as he had served until 2011, or after the 2010 election (which also shows him holding the seat). In the 2013 election tables, it shows Pimentel as having held the seat.

=== Per candidate ===
This table depicts the totals before the Senate Electoral Tribunal's 2011 decision on Pimentel v. Zubiri electoral protest.

A map showing the results by illustrating the topnotcher candidate by region.

Candidate	Party or alliance		Votes	%
Loren Legarda	Genuine Opposition	Nationalist People's Coalition	18,501,734	62.72
Francis Escudero	Genuine Opposition	Nationalist People's Coalition	18,265,307	61.92
Panfilo Lacson	Genuine Opposition	United Opposition	15,509,188	52.58
Manny Villar	Genuine Opposition	Nacionalista Party	15,338,412	52.00
Kiko Pangilinan	Liberal Party		14,534,678	49.27
Benigno Aquino III	Genuine Opposition	Liberal Party	14,309,349	48.51
Edgardo Angara	TEAM Unity	Laban ng Demokratikong Pilipino	12,657,769	42.91
Joker Arroyo	TEAM Unity	Kabalikat ng Malayang Pilipino	11,803,107	40.01
Alan Peter Cayetano	Genuine Opposition	Nacionalista Party	11,787,679	39.96
Gregorio Honasan	Independent		11,605,531	39.34
Antonio Trillanes	Genuine Opposition	United Opposition	11,189,671	37.93
Juan Miguel Zubiri (Note: Zubiri was later removed from office in favor of Koko Pimentel who won an election protest.)	TEAM Unity	Lakas–CMD	11,005,866	37.31
Koko Pimentel	Genuine Opposition	PDP–Laban	10,987,347	37.25
Ralph Recto	TEAM Unity	Lakas–CMD	10,721,252	36.34
Mike Defensor	TEAM Unity	Lakas–CMD	9,938,995	33.69
Prospero Pichay Jr.	TEAM Unity	Lakas–CMD	9,798,622	33.22
Sonia Roco	Genuine Opposition	Aksyon Demokratiko	8,457,748	28.67
Cesar Montano	TEAM Unity	Lakas–CMD	7,800,451	26.44
Tito Sotto	TEAM Unity	Nationalist People's Coalition	7,638,361	25.89
John Henry Osmeña	Genuine Opposition	United Opposition	7,267,048	24.64
Vicente Magsaysay	TEAM Unity	Lakas–CMD	6,357,905	21.55
Nikki Coseteng	Genuine Opposition	Independent	5,274,682	17.88
Tessie Aquino-Oreta	TEAM Unity	Nationalist People's Coalition	4,362,065	14.79
Chavit Singson	TEAM Unity	Lakas–CMD	4,353,644	14.76
Richard Gomez	Independent		2,725,664	9.24
Jamalul Kiram III	TEAM Unity	Partido Demokratiko Sosyalista ng Pilipinas	2,488,994	8.44
Melchor Chavez	Kilusang Bagong Lipunan		843,702	2.86
Martin Bautista	Ang Kapatiran		761,165	2.58
Zosimo Paredes	Ang Kapatiran		713,817	2.42
Joselito Pepito Cayetano	Kilusang Bagong Lipunan		510,366	1.73
Adrian Sison	Ang Kapatiran		402,331	1.36
Oliver Lozano	Kilusang Bagong Lipunan		305,647	1.04
Antonio Estrella	Kilusang Bagong Lipunan		285,488	0.97
Victor Wood	Kilusang Bagong Lipunan		283,036	0.96
Felix Cantal	Philippine Green Republican Party		123,608	0.42
Eduardo Orpilla	Kilusang Bagong Lipunan		107,532	0.36
Ruben Enciso	Kilusang Bagong Lipunan		100,523	0.34
Total			269,118,284	100.00
Total votes			29,498,660	–
Registered voters/turnout			43,104,362	68.44
Source: COMELEC

=== Per coalition ===
This table depicts the totals before the Senate Electoral Tribunal's 2011 decision on Pimentel v. Zubiri electoral protest.

Party or alliance		Votes	%	Seats
Genuine Opposition	Nationalist People's Coalition	36,767,041	13.66	2
Genuine Opposition	United Opposition	33,965,907	12.62	2
Genuine Opposition	Nacionalista Party	27,126,091	10.08	2
Genuine Opposition	Liberal Party	14,309,349	5.32	1
Genuine Opposition	PDP–Laban	10,987,347	4.08	0
Genuine Opposition	Aksyon Demokratiko	8,457,748	3.14	0
Genuine Opposition	Independent	5,274,682	1.96	0
Genuine Opposition	Total	136,888,165	50.87	7
TEAM Unity	Lakas–CMD	59,976,735	22.29	1
TEAM Unity	Laban ng Demokratikong Pilipino	12,657,769	4.70	1
TEAM Unity	Nationalist People's Coalition	12,000,426	4.46	0
TEAM Unity	Kabalikat ng Malayang Pilipino	11,803,107	4.39	1
TEAM Unity	Partido Demokratiko Sosyalista ng Pilipinas	2,488,994	0.92	0
TEAM Unity	Total	98,927,031	36.76	3
Liberal Party		14,534,678	5.40	1
Kilusang Bagong Lipunan		2,436,294	0.91	0
Ang Kapatiran		1,877,313	0.70	0
Philippine Green Republican Party		123,608	0.05	0
Independent		14,331,195	5.33	1
Total		269,118,284	100.00	12
Total votes		29,498,660	–	
Registered voters/turnout		43,104,362	68.44	

Vote share
GO	50.87%
TEAM Unity	36.76%
LP	5.40%
Others	6.97%

Senate seats
GO	58.33%
TEAM Unity	25.00%
LP	8.33%
Others	8.33%

=== Per party ===
This table depicts the totals before the Senate Electoral Tribunal's 2011 decision on Pimentel v. Zubiri electoral protest.

Party	Votes	%	+/–	Seats				
Party	Votes	%	+/–	Up	Before	Won	After	+/−
Lakas–CMD	59,976,735	22.29	−9.55	2	5	1	4	−1
Nationalist People's Coalition	48,767,467	18.12	New	0	0	2	2	+2
United Opposition	33,965,907	12.62	New	1	1	2	2	+1
Liberal Party	28,844,027	10.72	−1.06	3	5	2	4	−1
Nacionalista Party	27,126,091	10.08	New	1	2	2	3	+1
Laban ng Demokratikong Pilipino	12,657,769	4.70	New	1	2	1	2	0
Kabalikat ng Malayang Pilipino	11,803,107	4.39	New	1	1	1	1	0
PDP–Laban	10,987,347	4.08	New	1	2	0	0	−1
Aksyon Demokratiko	8,457,748	3.14	−0.53	0	0	0	0	0
Partido Demokratiko Sosyalista ng Pilipinas	2,488,994	0.92	New	0	0	0	0	0
Kilusang Bagong Lipunan	2,436,294	0.91	+0.70	0	0	0	0	0
Ang Kapatiran	1,877,313	0.70	New	0	0	0	0	0
Philippine Green Republican Party	123,608	0.05	New	0	0	0	0	0
Independent	19,605,877	7.29	−0.52	0	0	1	1	New
People's Reform Party				0	1	0	1	0
Pwersa ng Masang Pilipino				1	4	0	2	−2
Vacancy				1	1	0	1	0
Total	269,118,284	100.00	–	12	24	12	24	0
Total votes	29,498,660	–						
Registered voters/turnout	43,104,362	68.44						

Vote share
Lakas	22.19%
NPC	18.12%
UNO	12.62%
LP	10.72%
NP	10.08%
LDP	4.70%
KAMPI	4.39%
PDP-Laban	4.06%
Independent	7.29%
Others	5.83%

Senate seats won
Lakas	8.33%
NPC	16.67%
UNO	16.67%
LP	16.67%
NP	16.67%
LDP	8.33%
KAMPI	8.33%
PDP-Laban	0.00%
Independent	8.33%
Others	0.00%

=== Unofficial tallies ===
Party/coalition	Revised by SET	COMELEC	NAMFREL	Pulse Asia	ABS-CBN	GMA
GO	8	7	8	8	8	7
TEAM Unity	2	3	2	2	2	4
Independents	2	2	2	2	2	1
Others	0	0	0	0	0	0

==== ABS-CBN/Pulse Asia ====
Numbers in percentages. Conducted by ABS-CBN and Pulse Asia.

Name	Pulse Asia
Legarda, Loren	58.5
Escudero, Francis	53.3
Villar, Manuel Jr.,	49.8
Lacson, Panfilo	46.4
Pangilinan, Francis	44.6
Aquino, Benigno Simeon III	42.6
Angara, Edgardo	41.1
Arroyo, Joker	36.8
Trillanes, Antonio IV	35.4
Zubiri, Juan Miguel	34.9
Honasan, Gregorio	34.6
Recto, Ralph	34.3
Cayetano, Alan Peter	31.0
Pichay, Prospero Jr.	30.4
Pimentel, Aquilino III	28.5
Roco, Sonia	28.4
Defensor, Michael	28.2
Sotto, Vicente III	26.2
Montano, Cesar	24.0
Osmeña, John Henry	21.6
Magsaysay, Vicente	19.9
Coseteng, Anna Dominique	14.8
Oreta, Teresa	11.6
Singson, Luis	11.6
Gomez, Richard	8.9
Kiram, Jamalul III	6.6
Chavez, Melchor	3.0
Cayetano, Joselito	2.9
Bautista, Martin	2.6
Sison, Adrian	1.7
Paredes, Zosimo Jesus II	1.6
Lozano, Oliver	1.4
Wood, Victor	1.4
Estrella, Antonio	1.1
Cantal, Felix	0.7
Enciso, Ruben	0.7
Orpilla, Eduardo	0.3

==== NASSA/NAMFREL quick count ====
Partial and Unofficial - 197,084 of 224,748 precincts or 87.69% of total precincts. June 2, 2007 11:41 p.m. Batch 43.

Name	Party	NAMFREL
Legarda, Loren	NPC	15,200,169
Escudero, Francis	NPC	14,926,697
Lacson, Panfilo	UNO	12,880,049
Villar, Manuel Jr.	NP	12,537,728
Aquino, Benigno Simeon III	LP	11,965,505
Pangilinan, Francis	LP	11,930,557
Angara, Edgardo	LDP	10,403,534
Cayetano, Alan Peter	NP	9,691,262
Honasan, Gregorio	Independent	9,636,150
Arroyo, Joker	KAMPI	9,618,637
Trillanes, Antonio IV	UNO	9,248,609
Pimentel, Aquilino III	PDP-Laban	8,985,408
Zubiri, Juan Miguel	Lakas–CMD	8,811,731
Recto, Ralph	Lakas–CMD	8,599,532
Defensor, Michael	Lakas–CMD	8,075,073
Pichay, Prospero Jr.	Lakas–CMD	7,938,313
Roco, Sonia	AD	7,027,063
Montano, Cesar	Lakas–CMD	6,444,301
Osmeña, John Henry	UNO	6,095,478
Sotto, Vicente III	NPC	6,082,898
Magsaysay, Vicente	Lakas–CMD	5,269,394
Coseteng, Anna Dominique	Independent	4,408,406
Oreta, Teresa	NPC	3,481,280
Singson, Luis	Lakas–CMD	3,468,039
Gomez, Richard	Independent	2,308,620
Kiram, Jamalul III	PDSP	1,956,612
Chavez, Melchor	KBL	753,434
Paredes, Zosimo II	AK	716,544
Bautista, Martin	AK	689,272
Cayetano, Joselito	KBL	560,281
Sison, Adrian	AK	420,080
Lozano, Oliver	KBL	366,146
Estrella, Antonio	KBL	344,670
Wood, Victor	KBL	310,079
Orpilla, Eduardo	KBL	211,986
Enciso, Ruben	KBL	184,401
Cantal, Felix	PGRP	165,116

Source: NAMFRELPHILIPPINES.org website

== Defeated incumbents ==
1. Ralph Recto (Lakas/TEAM Unity), ran in 2010 and won

== Aftermath ==
Although the Genuine Opposition gained control of the Senate after the elections, they were divided on who was to be next Senate President. As such, Senate President Manuel Villar (Nacionalista) formed a bloc in the Senate to contest the Senate presidency. Facing him was the minority leader Aquilino Pimentel Jr. backed by several fellow opposition senators. On July 26, 2007, Villar defeated Pimentel was elected to Senate by a vote of 15–7 with Villar and Pimentel voting for each other. Senator Antonio Trillanes was not allowed to attend the Senate session.

This is how the election for the Senate presidency went:

Voted for Villar	Voted for Pimentel	Not voting	Vacancy
1. Manny Villar; 2. Edgardo Angara (LDP); 3. Joker Arroyo (Kampi); 4. Alan Peter Cayetano; 5. Pia Cayetano; 6. Miriam Defensor Santiago (PRP); 7. Juan Ponce Enrile (PMP); 8. Francis Escudero (NPC); 9. Jinggoy Estrada (PMP); 10. Dick Gordon (Independent); 11. Gregorio Honasan (Independent); 12. Lito Lapid (Lakas); 13. Francis Pangilinan (Liberal); 14. Bong Revilla (Lakas); 15. Migz Zubiri (Lakas)	1. Aquilino Pimentel Jr.; 2. Benigno Aquino III (Liberal); 3. Rodolfo Biazon (Liberal); 4. Panfilo Lacson (UNO); 5. Loren Legarda (NPC); 6. Jamby Madrigal (UNO); 7. Mar Roxas (Liberal)	1. Antonio Trillanes (UNO; detained) *	1. Seat vacated by Alfredo Lim (PMP; Elected Mayor of Manila)
Votes needed to win: 13

== Media websites ==
- Halalan 2007 - Election coverage by ABS-CBN
- Eleksyon 2007- Election coverage by GMA Network
- Eleksyon 2007 - Election coverage by the Philippine Daily Inquirer
