= Pimentel v. Zubiri =

Philippine Senate electoral protest case

- Court: Senate Electoral Tribunal
- Full case name: Aquilino L. Pimentel III versus Juan Miguel Zubiri
- Decided: August 11, 2011
- Citation: SET Case No. 001-07
- Transcript: Decision

Court membership
- Judges sitting: Carpio (Senior Associate Justice), de Castro, Velasco (associate justices), P. Cayetano, Honasan, Lapid, Pangilinan, Revilla, Trillanes (senator-members)

Case opinions
- Concurrence: Carpio, de Castro, Velasco, P. Cayetano, Honasan, Lapid, Pangilinan, Revilla, Trillanes

Aquilino L. Pimentel III versus Juan Miguel Zubiri (SET Case No. 001-07), better known as Pimentel v. Zubiri, is a Senate Electoral Tribunal case that resolved the election protest filed by Koko Pimentel after the proclamation of Juan Miguel Zubiri as senator after the 2007 Philippine Senate election. The tribunal on June 19, 2008, resolved to proceed with the election protest of Pimentel against Senator Zubiri: "Indeed, there is reasonable ground to believe that the outcome of the case could affect the officially proclaimed results of the 12th senatorial position in the 2007 Senate election, hence, the election protest case deserves further proceedings by the tribunal.

On August 3, 2011, Zubiri resigned his Senate seat weeks after former Autonomous Region in Muslim Mindanao governor Zaldy Ampatuan and the Maguindanao provincial election supervisor revealed the alleged irregularities in the 2007 election at the province.

On August 11, 2011, little more than a week after Zubiri's resignation, the SET proclaimed Pimentel as the 12th winning senator in the 2007 elections. The SET decision was based on the evidence presented by Pimentel in his protest showing many ballots were spurious.

== Background ==
In the Philippine electoral system under plurality-at-large voting, a voter can vote up to twelve candidates, with the twelve candidates with the highest number of votes nationwide are elected. The twelve elected senators join the twelve elected senators of 2004 election to sit in the 14th Congress of the Philippines from 2007 to 2010. The seats of the elected senators of 2007 would be next contested in the 2013 election.

The 2007 Senate election was contested mainly by two coalitions: the pro-Gloria Macapagal Arroyo TEAM Unity coalition and the anti-administration Genuine Opposition (GO) coalition. GO's Antonio Trillanes and Koko Pimentel, and Juan Miguel Zubiri of TEAM Unity were contesting the last two Senate seats. Trillanes was eventually proclaimed as the 11th senator, leaving Pimentel and Zubiri contesting the 12th seat.

== Zubiri's proclamation ==
In the final tally for the 2007 senatorial race by the Commission on Elections (COMELEC), Zubiri narrowly edged out opposition candidate Koko Pimentel for the 12th and last slot in the Senate. Zubiri had a total of 11,005,866 votes against Pimentel's 10,984,347 votes. The margin of some 21,519 votes was hotly contested, particularly the votes from the southern Philippine province of Maguindanao, where Pimentel had lost heavily to Zubiri.

Claiming the votes in Maguindanao were tainted, Pimentel petitioned the Philippine Supreme Court to invalidate the votes from Maguindanao, effectively disenfranchising a whole province. The Supreme Court voted unanimously 14–0 against Pimentel and allowed the COMELEC to count the votes in Zubiri's favor. Pimentel then returned to the Supreme Court for the second time. This time, he petitioned them to issue a restraining order against the proclamation of Zubiri. After oral arguments however the High Tribunal again voted to uphold the COMELEC's decision to proclaim Zubiri, consequently failing to grant Pimentel's petition. The next day, July 14, 2007, Zubiri was duly proclaimed elected to the Philippine Senate. However, the Court's judgment did not prevent Pimentel from bringing his poll protests to the Senate Electoral Tribunal.

== Electoral protest ==
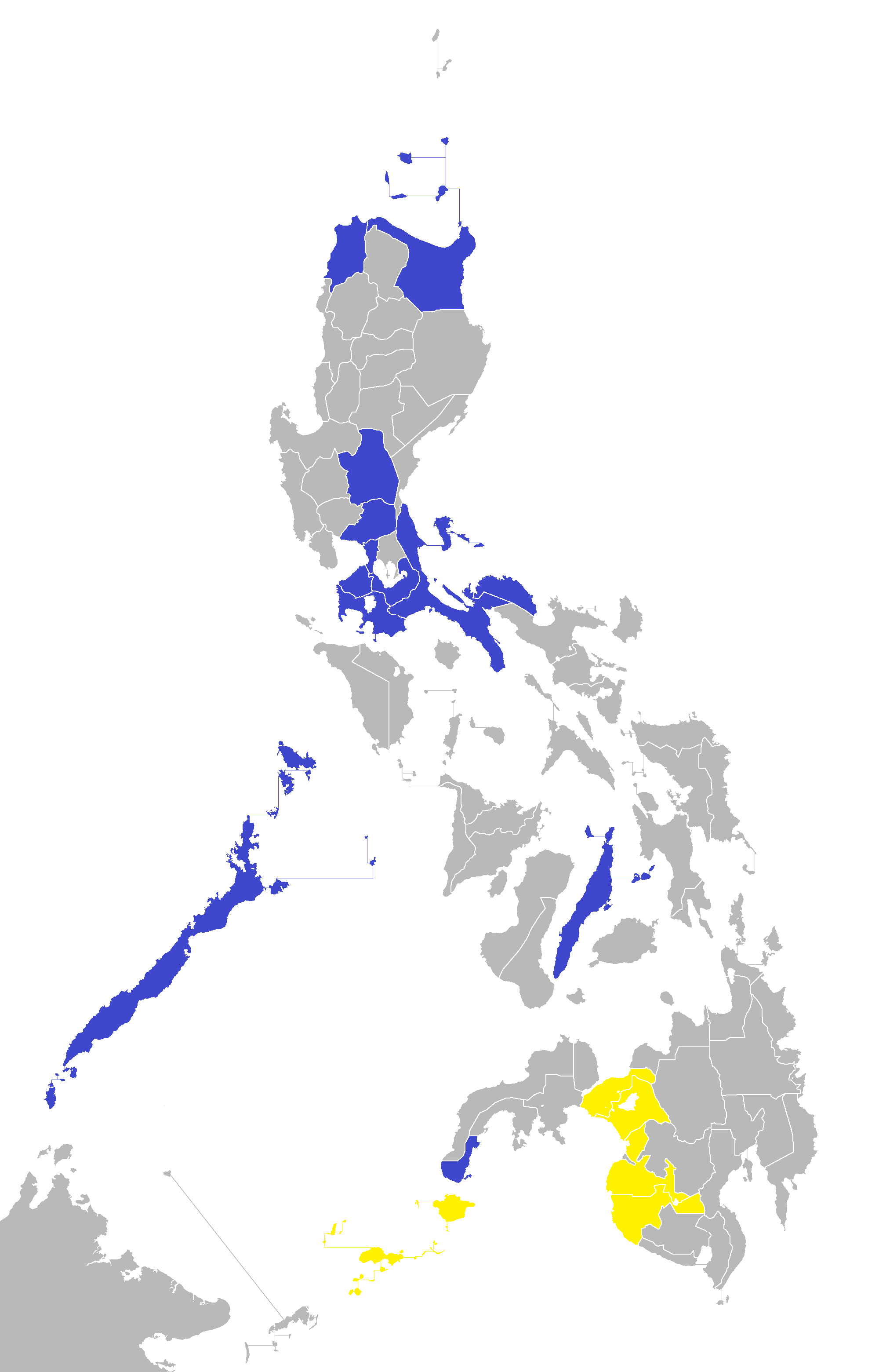
Provinces that have precincts included in Pimentel's electoral protest are shaded yellow; those for Zubiri's counter-protest are shaded blue.

Pimentel filed the electoral protest to the SET on July 14, 2007, which covered 2,658 precincts, in the provinces of Maguindanao (1,078), Lanao del Norte (496), Shariff Kabunsuan (291), Basilan (134), Sultan Kudarat (282), Lanao del Sur (161) and Sulu (216). Zubiri then filed a counter-protest on 73,265 precincts.

On January 1, 2008, Pimentel made a statement that he now leads Zubiri by 12,000 votes after all ballot boxes from Sultan Kudarat, Maguindanao to be empty: hence all votes for all candidates, including Pimentel's and Zubiri's were wiped out. Zubiri led Pimentel by 31,000 votes in that municipality. Zubiri's lawyers then stated that they will contest the exclusion of the votes from Sultan Kudarat, citing Lerias v. House of Representatives Electoral Tribunal, where the Supreme Court allowed the use of other election documents when contested ballots are missing.

On March 14, 2008, the Supreme Court in a 40-page decision penned by Associate Justice Minita Chico-Nazario, dismissed Koko Pimentel's petition to stop the Commission on Elections from canvassing votes from the province of Maguindanao, a definite morale booster for Senator Zubiri.

Pimentel issued another statement In July 2009 stating that he now has a 96,400-vote lead in the recount. Pimentel stated that 98.15% of the votes in the six of nine of Pimentel's pilot municipalities were spurious. Zubiri countered that since the SET allowed the revision of votes on Pimentel's protest, the same should also be done on his counter-protest. In his counter-protest that mostly Metro Manila, he said that while Pimentel has a 96,400 vote-lead in his protest, Zubiri's counter-protest has him leading by 132,014 votes in Metro Manila, a net lead of 17,913 votes for Zubiri.

After the 2010 Senate election, the SET with its new composition allowed Zubiri to expand the scope of his counter-protest. Pimentel appealed the decision, which allowed the scrutiny of 52,000 ballot boxes, a process that "could take more than six years," noted SET chairman Antonio Carpio who dissented on the decision. The vote was seen as political maneuvering in the then-upcoming election for the Senate President.

== Revelations of Bedol and Ampatuan ==
In July 2011, former Maguindanao election supervisor Lintang Bedol and suspended Autonomous Region in Muslim Mindanao governor Zaldy Ampatuan revealed that there was massive election fraud during the 2007 election. SET member Francis Pangilinan urged Ampatuan and others who knew of alleged election cheating to submit affidavits to the SET, noting though that these new revelations won't necessarily speed up the resolution of the protests.

On August 3, 2011, Zubiri resigned as a senator, insisting that he did not cheat or asked anyone to cheat for him in the 2007 election. Zubiri cited the issue dividing the nation and placing doubts on the electoral system as the reason for his resignation. Pimentel was dismayed in Zubiri's insistence that the allegations of election fraud were unfounded, adding that the SET should proclaim a new senator as Zubiri's resignation makes his counter-protest "moot and academic." Senate President Juan Ponce Enrile immediately announced that he will study on what to do next as there is no precedent; Senator Francis Escudero, on the other hand, said that Zubiri's resignation is effective immediately, citing instances where senators left office to accept other positions such as when Raul Manglapus became Foreign Affairs Secretary, Alfredo Lim became Mayor of Manila, Teofisto Guingona became vice president, and when then-Senator Aquino was inaugurated as president.

Ampatuan and Bedol agreed with Zubiri's resignation; Ampatuan said that Zubiri was affected by his conscience. Commission on Elections Chairman Sixto Brillantes said that the resignation implies that fraud did occur in 2007 and that will benefit Pimentel. The Office of the President and Vice President Jejomar Binay sent their well wishes to Zubiri commending his contributions at the Senate.

Zubiri announced his intention to withdraw his counter-protest so that the SET can resolve Pimentel's counter-protest immediately. On August 11, 2011, four years after the election, the tribunal proclaimed Pimentel as the winner, with Pimentel getting 10,898,786 votes while Zubiri got 10,640,620. Pimentel was sworn into office in Mati, Davao Oriental, by Davao Oriental Governor Corazon Nunez-Malanyaon; it was in Davao Oriental where Pimentel finished second in the election, his highest rank among the provinces.

== Pimentel and Zubiri reconciliation ==
In 2013, Pimentel opted to run under the banner of the Administration Party Team PNoy as Pimentel uncomfortable to run along with Zubiri to the United Nationalist Alliance (UNA), Pimentel won as 8th placer. In 2016, Pimentel and Zubiri reconciled as the latter voted for the former as the Senate President. In 2019, Zubiri endorsed Pimentel under the banner of the administration party, Coalition for Change who won and defended him from the allegations that he is prohibited from running for reelection on that year. The two remain friends in 2022, despite that they are leading the different blocs in the Senate.

== Results ==
	Koko Pimentel (Genuine Opposition)	Juan Miguel Zubiri (TEAM Unity)	Margin
	PDP–Laban	Lakas–CMD	Margin
Zubiri proclamation	10,984,807	11,004,099	19,292
Canvassing after proclamation	10,987,347	11,005,866	18,519
Deducted votes by the SET	88,561	365,246	—
Revised total as per decision by the SET	10,898,786	10,640,620	258,166

== Members of the Senate Electoral Tribunal ==
14th Congress (2007–2010)
Member	Political party
Leonardo Quisumbing	Supreme Court associate justice (chairperson)
Antonio Carpio	Supreme Court associate justice
Renato Corona	Supreme Court associate justice (2007–2010); Supreme Court chief justice (2010)
Edgardo Angara	LDP
Benigno Aquino III	Liberal
Pia Cayetano	Nacionalista
Francis Escudero	NPC (until 2010)
Francis Escudero	Independent (since 2010)
Panfilo Lacson	Independent
Bong Revilla	Lakas

15th Congress (2010–2011)
Member	Political party
Antonio Carpio	Supreme Court associate justice (chairperson)
Presbitero Velasco	Supreme Court associate justice
Teresita Leonardo-de Castro	Supreme Court associate justice
Pia Cayetano	Nacionalista
Gregorio Honasan	Independent
Lito Lapid	Lakas
Francis Pangilinan	Liberal
Bong Revilla	Lakas
Antonio Trillanes	Independent
Edgardo Angara (until July 2011)	LDP
Francis Escudero (until July 2011)	Independent
Panfilo Lacson (until July 2011)	Independent
Loren Legarda (until July 2011)	NPC

== See also ==
- 1947 Philippine Senate election: Eulogio Rodriguez, Sr. won in a successful protest case, unseating Carlos Tan in 1949.
- 1949 Philippine Senate election: Claro M. Recto won in a successful protest case, unseating Teodoro de Vera in 1952.
