= Nikki Coseteng =

Filipino actress and politician

The Honorable Nikki Coseteng
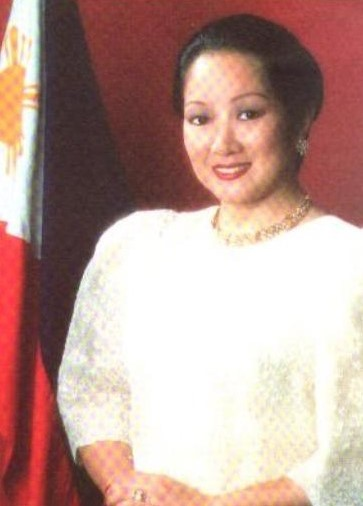
- Official portrait, 1997

Senator of the Philippines
- In office June 30, 1992 – June 30, 2001

Member of the Philippine House of Representatives from Quezon City's 3rd congressional district
- In office June 30, 1987 – June 30, 1992
- Preceded by: District established
- Succeeded by: Dennis Roldan

Personal details
- Born: Anna Dominique Marquez-Lim Coseteng; December 18, 1952 (age 73) Manila, Philippines
- Party: Independent (2007–present); NPC (1992–2007); KAIBA (1987–1992)
- Children: 2

Anna Dominique "Nikki" Marquez-Lim Coseteng (born December 18, 1952) is a Filipina actress and politician who served as a senator from 1992 to 2001, and as representative of Quezon City's 3rd district from 1987 to 1992.

== Early life ==
Coseteng was born on December 18, 1952, the daughter of Emerson T. Coseteng and Alicia Guanco Marquez-Lim. Her mother was a cousin of John Gokongwei. Her grandfather, Eduardo Coseteng (許友超), was also the first mayor of Xiamen. For her early schooling, she went to St. Paul College Quezon City, Maryknoll College and St. Maur's Convent in Weybridge, Surrey in England, and after that went to St. Theresa's College in Baguio. She attended the College of Notre Dame in Belmont, California, and Palo Alto Senior High School in California, USA and the University of the Philippines Diliman at the tertiary level.

At the age of 18, she was appointed Assistant to the President of the Mariwasa Group of Companies. From 1970 to 1981, she was curator and proprietress of her own art gallery, Galerie Dominique. In 1982, she became team manager of the Mariwasa basketball team of the Philippine Basketball Association. The following year, she took ownership of the franchise and renamed it Galerie Dominique. She served in the PBA as vice-president and treasurer during the same year.

== Filmography ==
Year	Title	Role	Notes	Ref(s).
1989	Sa Kuko ng Agila	Cristy		

== Politics ==
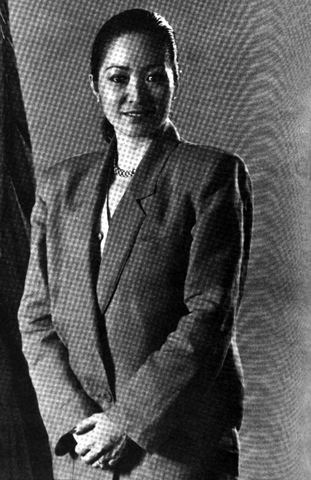
Coseteng official portrait during the 8th Congress.

She became a street parliamentarian and human rights activist during the latter part of the Marcos years. After the EDSA Revolution, she became radio commentator of Radyo ng Bayan and later host of Womanwatch on PTV television and radio. In 1991, she published Sinaunang Habi – Philippine Ancestral Weave.

She was elected member of the House of Representatives for the 3rd District of Quezon City in 1987.

In 1992, she was elected senator and became Chairperson of the Committee on Women and Family Relations and the Committee on Cultural Communities. She was also Vice-Chairperson of the Committees on Cooperatives, on Public Works, and on Trade on Commerce. In 1995, she was re-elected senator and served until 2001. She became the Chairperson of the Committee on Labor, Employment and Human Resource Development, and the Committee on Civil Service and Government Reorganization. She also became vice-chairperson of various Senate Committees.

She was among the eleven senators who voted against examining the second envelope of evidence against President Joseph Estrada's impeachment trial in January 2001, leading directly to the Second EDSA Revolution.

She ran in 2007 under the Genuine Opposition coalition but was unsuccessful, placing 22nd.

== Awards ==
As a public official, she was a convenor of many conferences which include the National Convention on the Prevention of Family Violence, International Association of Women in Radio and Television, Wakasan ang Karahasan Laban sa Kababaihan sa Loob ng Tahanan, Regional Consultations on the Prevention of Family Violence, Sisterhood is Global: Dialogues in the Philippines, Advocates for the Study and Ratification of the Constitution, and the Legislators' Dialogue on International Standards.

She was one of the Top Human Advocates in the Senate (1992–1995), one of the Twelve Outstanding Freshmen Solons of 1991, one of the Top Ten Outstanding Representatives of 1991, Outstanding Congresswoman of 1989, and one of the Top Ten Lawmakers and Achievers of 1988. She was also the recipient of numerous awards, such as the Gawad Maria Clara Trophy – A Symbol of Filipina Womanhood in 1990.

== Later life ==
Having visited almost more than 2,000 municipalities in the Philippines, she has been an Adopted Daughter of Antique, Nueva Ecija, Prosperidad City in Agusan del Sur, Ivisan in Capiz, Banate in Iloilo, Hilongos, Dagami and Tunga in Leyte and Binalonan in Pangasinan.

Since December 2006, she has been managing the Diliman Educational Corporation, which operates Diliman Preparatory School and Diliman College.

The senator speaks fluent English, Tagalog, and Hokkien Chinese and is at home with several regional languages in the Philippines, such as Hiligaynon.

Her family includes a son and a daughter.

House of Representatives of the Philippines
New title	Member of the House of Representatives from Quezon City's 3rd district 1987–1992	Succeeded by Dennis Roldan
