= Genuine Opposition =

Electoral alliance in the Philippines that contested the 2007 elections

- Leader: Manny Villar
- Founder: Jejomar Binay
- Founded: 2007
- Dissolved: 2010
- Preceded by: Koalisyon ng Nagkakaisang Pilipino
- Succeeded by: United Nationalist Alliance
- Political parties: UNO; Liberal (Drilon wing); PMP; PDP–Laban; NPC (Escudero/Legarda wing); Nacionalista; KBL (Marcos wing); Aksyon; LDP (Trinidad/Calixto wing)
- Slogan: Isang boto lang po, laban sa nakaupo (lit. 'One vote against the incumbent')

The Genuine Opposition (GO) was an electoral alliance in the Philippines that contested the 2007 Philippine general election. The alliance's members were in opposition to President Gloria Macapagal Arroyo. It was originally called the United Opposition (UNO), founded by Makati Mayor Jejomar Binay in June 2005 to unite all politicians who wanted to impeach President Arroyo. UNO then reorganized itself and changed its name to Grand and Broad Coalition (GBC), with the UNO party under that coalition. On February 15, 2007, the group changed its name again to Genuine Opposition after a meeting with Senate President Manny Villar due to the defection of senators Edgardo Angara, Tessie Aquino-Oreta, and Tito Sotto to Arroyo's senatorial slate, TEAM Unity.

In the Senate election, GO won seven of the 12 contested seats. They gained one more seat in 2011 after an electoral protest, through which GO's Koko Pimentel replaced TEAM Unity's Migz Zubiri. However, GO failed to dominate the House of Representatives.

== Coalition members ==
Mainstream party members:

- United Opposition (UNO)
- Liberal Party (Liberal–Drilon wing)
- Pwersa ng Masang Pilipino (PMP)
- PDP–Laban
- Nationalist People's Coalition (NPC–Escudero/Legarda wing)
- Nacionalista Party (Nacionalista)
- Kilusang Bagong Lipunan (KBL–Marcos wing)
- Aksyon Demokratiko (Aksyon)
- Laban ng Demokratikong Pilipino (LDP–Trinidad/Calixto wing)

== Background ==
The United Opposition coalition was created by Makati Mayor Jejomar Binay in June 2005 to unite all politicians who wished to impeach President Gloria Macapagal Arroyo. The UNO started scouting candidates for the Senate as early as October 2006 to claim a large share of the Senate seats. In January 2007, UNO started short-listing its nominees after many interested personalities wanted to join the opposition. The UNO changed its name on February 12, 2007, at the Club Filipino in San Juan, Metro Manila, to "Grand and Broad Coalition" (GBC). On February 15, 2007, the group changed its name again to "Genuine Opposition" (GO) after a meeting with Senate President Manny Villar in his office in Las Piñas. GO became the opposition coalition with eight parties under its wing, including its predecessor, UNO. Though Senate President Manny Villar and Senate Majority Leader Francis Pangilinan are running under the opposition, they remain independent candidates as in the 2001 election. On February 28, 2007, the Genuine Opposition dropped Francis Pangilinan as its adopted candidate. After the elections, GO reverted to being the United Opposition, with Binay as head, but still maintaining the support of the other parties that comprised GO.

== Slogans ==
The first slogan is "PLAN Co REVOLT" (lit. 'My Plan Is to Revolt'), meaning "Revolt against corruption and poverty". It is an acronym of the candidates' names, with P standing for Pimentel, L standing for Lacson, A standing for Alan, N standing for Noynoy, Co standing for Coseteng, R standing for Roco, E standing for Escudero, V standing for Villar, O standing for Osmeña, L standing for Legarda, and T standing for Trillanes.

The second slogan is "Isang boto lang po, laban sa nakaupo" (transl. 'One vote against the incumbent').

== Senatorial slate ==
Name	Party	Occupation	Elected
Benigno "Noynoy" Aquino III	Liberal	Representative from Tarlac (1998–2007)	Yes
Alan Peter Cayetano	Nacionalista	Representative from Taguig-Pateros (1998–2007)	Yes
Nikki Coseteng	Independent	Former senator (1992–2001) and former Quezon City Representative (1987–1992).	No
Francis Escudero	NPC	House Minority Floor Leader (2001–2007) and Representative from Sorsogon (1998–2007)	Yes
Panfilo Lacson	UNO	Senator (2001–present), former Chief of the Philippine National Police.	Yes
Loren Legarda	NPC	Former senator (1998–2004).	Yes
John Henry Osmeña	UNO	Former senator (1971–1972; 1987–1995; 1998–2004).	No
Koko Pimentel	PDP–Laban	Lawyer, Commissioner of the National Youth Commission for Mindanao (1996–1998)	Yes
Sonia Roco	Aksyon	Educator	No
Antonio Trillanes	UNO	Detained military officer, leader of the Magdalo group and the leader of the Oakwood Mutiny in Makati in 2003.	Yes
Manny Villar	Nacionalista	Former Speaker of the House and former Senate President (2006–2008) and senator (2001–present).	Yes

== Campaign team ==
- Campaign Manager: Senator Serge Osmeña (PDP–Laban)
- Deputy Campaign Manager: San Juan Mayor JV Ejercito (PMP)
- Campaign Spokesman: Atty. Adel Tamano, former president of Pamantasan ng Lungsod ng Maynila

== See also ==
- Koalisyon ng Nagkakaisang Pilipino (KNP) (Coalition of United Filipinos), the opposition's coalition in the 2004 Presidential elections.
- Puwersa ng Masa (Force of the Masses), the opposition's coalition in the 2001 midterm elections.
- Laban ng Makabayang Masang Pilipino (LAMMP) (Struggle of Patriotic Filipino Masses), the opposition's coalition in the 1998 Presidential elections.
- TEAM Unity, Genuine Opposition rival coalition last 2007 midterm elections.
- United Nationalist Alliance
- Team PNoy, Most Genuine Opposition candidates are reelected in 2013 midterm election.
- Hugpong ng Pagbabago, Most Team PNoy candidates are reelected in 2019 midterm election.
- Alyansa para sa Bagong Pilipinas, Most Hugpong ng Pagbabago candidates are reelected in 2025 midterm election.
