= Antonio Trillanes =

Filipino politician (born 1971)

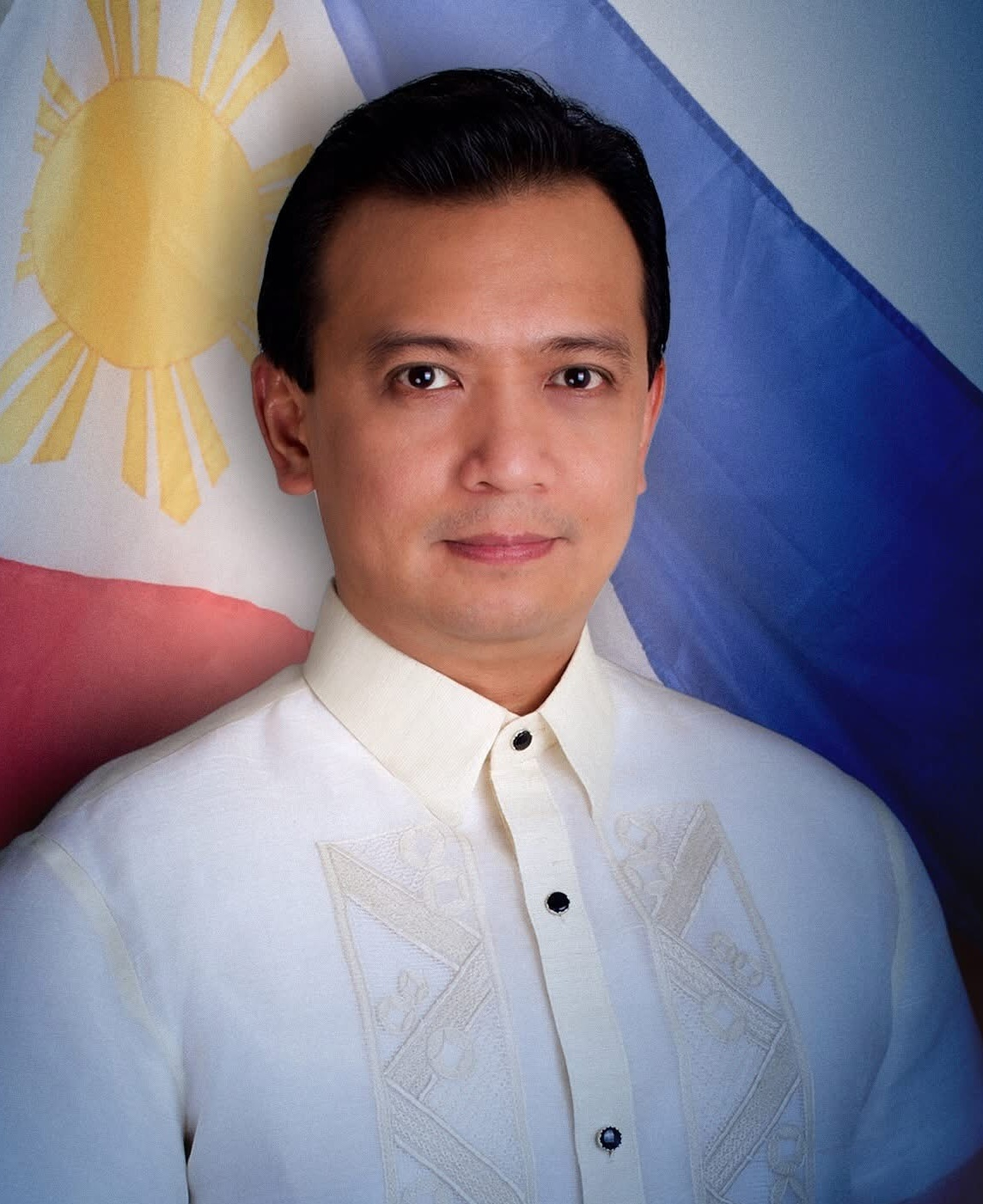
- Official portrait, 2014

Senator of the Philippines
- In office June 30, 2007 – June 30, 2019

Chair of the Senate National Defense and Security Committee
- In office July 22, 2013 – June 30, 2016
- Preceded by: Francis Escudero
- Succeeded by: Gregorio Honasan

Chair of the Senate Civil Service and Government Reorganization Committee
- In office July 26, 2010 – June 30, 2019
- Preceded by: Panfilo Lacson (Acting)
- Succeeded by: Bong Revilla

Personal details
- Born: Antonio Fuentes Trillanes IV; August 6, 1971 (age 55) Caloocan, Philippines
- Party: Aksyon (2024–present); Magdalo (party-list; 2010–present)
- Other political affiliations: Liberal (2021–2024); Nacionalista (2010–2021); UNO (2007–2010)
- Spouse: Arlene G. Orejana–Trillanes
- Children: 3
- Education: Philippine Military Academy (BS); University of the Philippines Diliman (MPA)
- Occupation: Professor, and former Philippine Navy lieutenant
- Website: Official Website
- Nickname: Sonny

Military service
- Allegiance: Philippines
- Branch/service: Philippine Navy
- Years of service: 1995–2003 (8 years)
- Rank: Lieutenant
- Battles/wars: Communist rebellion in the Philippines; Moro conflict Oakwood mutiny

YouTube information
- Channel: Sonny Trillanes
- Years active: 2015–present
- Genres: Informative, fact-checking, news, vlogs
- Subscribers: 68.9 thousand
- Views: 2.12 million
- Last updated: Dec 8, 2025

Antonio "Sonny" Fuentes Trillanes IV (Tagalog pronunciation: [trilˈjanɛs]; born August 6, 1971) is a former Philippine naval officer and politician who served as a senator of the Philippines from 2007 to 2019. He is known for his involvement in the Oakwood mutiny of 2003 and the Manila Peninsula siege in 2007 in protest against the Arroyo administration. He was a prominent critic of the Duterte administration.

Trillanes previously ran for vice president in the 2016 Philippine presidential elections. After his term as senator, he became a full-time lecturer, teaching public policy at UP National College of Public Administration and Governance of the University of the Philippines Diliman and at Ateneo de Manila University.

== Early life ==
Trillanes was born on August 6, 1971, in Caloocan, to Navy Capt. Antonio Floranza Trillanes of Ligao, Albay, and Estelita Diaz Fuentes of Capiz. Raised in Caloocan, he has four siblings.

== Education ==
Trillanes attended Siena College of Quezon City for his elementary education, which he completed in 1983. He then attended Angelicum School for his secondary education, completing it in 1987. For his college education, he initially attended De La Salle University for a degree in Electronics and Communications Engineering beginning in 1987. However, in 1991, he decided to enter the Philippine Military Academy, where he graduated cum laude in 1995 with a Naval Systems Engineering degree.

He received his master's degree in Public Administration from the University of the Philippines Diliman.

== Military career ==
Trillanes is a recipient of an assortment of merit medals, campaign ribbons and badges totaling 23.

During his 5-year sea duty experience, Trillanes apprehended dozens of smugglers, illegal loggers, poachers, human smugglers and illegal fishermen conducted off the coasts of several provinces, he was also involved in actions against the Abu Sayyaf and participated in a total of 22 naval exercises

=== Oakwood Mutiny ===
In July 2003, Trillanes, then a Lieutenant Senior Grade, along with Army Capt. Gerardo Gambala, led 321 junior officers and enlisted men of the Armed Forces (AFP) in a mutiny against the Arroyo administration. Calling themselves the "Bagong Katipuneros" (lit. 'New Katipuneros') but tagged by the press as the Magdalo group, the soldiers occupied the Oakwood Premier Ayala Center (now Ascott Makati), a serviced apartment tower in Makati, to protest the alleged corruption of the administration when it came to the military. Among their demands were the resignation of Defense Secretary Angelo Reyes and AFP Chief of Intelligence Service Victor Corpus.

The mutiny was unsuccessful, lasting only 18 hours. Trillanes and his men were charged in a general court martial. He was detained for nearly seven and a half years.

=== Manila Peninsula siege ===
On November 29, 2007, Trillanes, Brigadier Gen. Danilo Lim, and 25 others charged in relation to the Oakwood mutiny, walked out of their trial and marched in Makati towards the Manila Peninsula Hotel. They seized control of the hotel, which was just a few blocks away from the location of their earlier mutiny. There, they called for the ousting of Gloria Macapagal-Arroyo. They were joined by former vice president Teofisto Guingona Jr., who called for a "new EDSA."

The attempted coup was over by 5:10 p.m. PHT, however, when government soldiers broke through the hotel. Trillanes and Lim surrendered, reasoning they were doing so "to avoid loss of lives." The siege lasted for six hours.

Trillanes and his cohorts were arrested by the Philippine National Police and were sent to Camp Bagong Diwa. Among the arrested were journalists from various networks. Defense secretary Gilberto Teodoro defended the journalists' arrests, claiming the officers "didn't know the journalists and may have mistook them as renegade soldiers." The journalists were released soon after.

== Political career ==
=== Senate ===
==== First term (2007–2013) ====
Trillanes filed his candidacy for the 2007 senatorial elections as an independent candidate. Later, however, he accepted an invitation from the Genuine Opposition as one of its guest candidates fielded against the Arroyo administration's bets. His bid was successful, and he was proclaimed senator-elect by the COMELEC. He was the youngest senator to hold the office since Benigno Aquino, Jr., a record he would later share with Bam Aquino in 2013.

On July 23, 2007, Trillanes filed a motion with the Makati RTC that would allow him to fulfill his senatorial duties while under detention, and allow him to attend the SONA. His plea was denied. In response, former UP president Francisco Nemenzo Jr. and former Vice President Teofisto Guingona Jr. launched the "Let Trillanes Serve Movement."

On October 17, 2007, the Supreme Court, in an en banc resolution, directed the Armed Forces and Makati RTC Judge Oscar Pimentel to comment within 10 days on Trillanes' petition. However, these requests were later overshadowed by Trillanes' involvement in the Manila Peninsula siege.

On December 20, 2010, Trillanes was temporarily released. He was later granted amnesty by President Benigno Aquino III.

==== Second term (2013–2019) ====
Trillanes ran again for a second term, filing his candidacy for the 2013 senatorial elections. Running under the Nacionalista Party, he again won, garnering over 14 million votes.

Trillanes was one of the most productive senators in the 17th Congress, producing 232 bills in 2018, despite being only present for 52 session days.

=== 2016 vice presidential campaign ===
Trillanes declared his intention to run for higher office as vice president in the 2016 national elections. Running with no president, he endorsed the presidential bid of Grace Poe.

His campaign was marked by a controversy involving the several paid negative campaign ads against Rodrigo Duterte, including a video showing him dropping the finger. Described as "black propaganda," Duterte's running mate Alan Peter Cayetano filed a petition to the Taguig RTC to stop the airing of the ads for 72 hours. The petition was granted by court using a TRO.

Trillanes eventually lost the heavily contested race to Camarines Sur 3rd District Representative Leni Robredo, after garnering more than 800,000 votes.

=== 2022 Senate bid ===
On October 8, 2021, Trillanes filed his candidacy for senator in the 2022 senatorial election, running under the Liberal Party. Trillanes failed his comeback bid to the Senate after placing 21st in the official results.

=== 2025 Caloocan mayoral bid ===
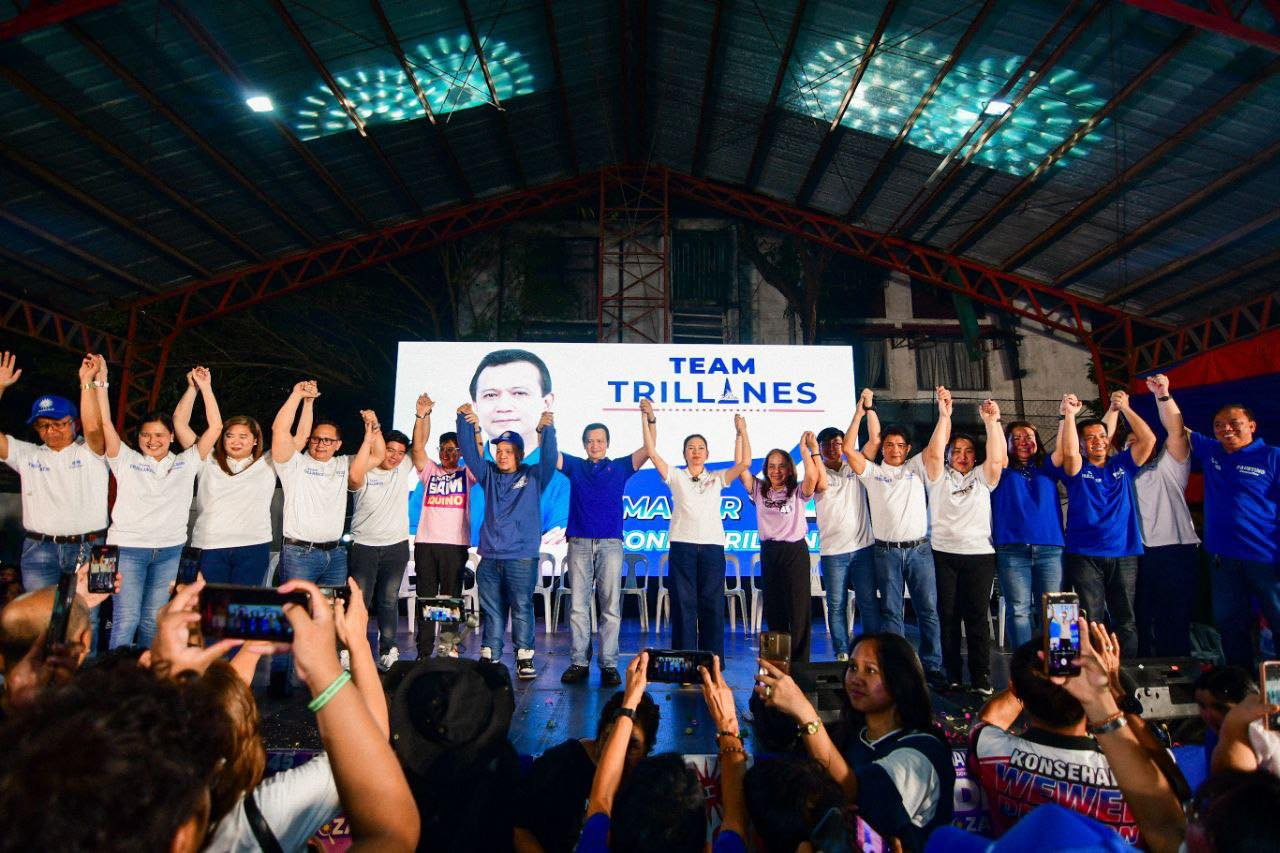
Kick-off proclamation rally of Team Trillanes in BF Homes Caloocan

In early 2024, Trillanes expressed his intent to run for mayor of Caloocan during the 2025 election. On July 15, 2024, Trillanes joined Aksyon Demokratiko and confirmed his candidacy for mayor of Caloocan. In the September Magdalo Party-List mass oath taking in Caloocan, Trillanes formally announced his mayoralty candidacy. He was an opposition candidate against the Malapitan family, who has held the mayoral position since 2013, with Along Malapitan as the incumbent. However, he lost his bid, placing second behind Malapitan.

== Criticism and controversies ==
=== Criticism against Binay family ===
From August 2014 to January 2016, Trillanes led 25 hearings as part of the Senate Blue Ribbon Committee, wherein he accused Vice President Jejomar Binay and his family of various corrupt practices especially during the family's tenure as mayor of Makati.

As a result, in 2017, Junjun Binay filed a libel case against Trillanes, accusing him of “publicly and maliciously” accused him and his family of “bribery and other crimes without factual basis.” In 2021, Makati Regional Trial Court Branch 148 ruled Trillanes guilty for libelous claims, fined him ₱100,000, and asked him to pay ₱500,000 in moral damages and lawsuit costs.

=== Criticism against President Rodrigo Duterte ===
Before the 2016 election, he alleged that then-Davao City Mayor and presidential candidate Rodrigo Duterte had an account at Bank of the Philippine Islands (BPI) Julia Vargas branch in Pasig, allegedly containing ₱2.2 billion. Duterte, later on in his presidency, confirmed the existence of the alleged bank accounts, but he refused to sign a waiver to dispute the alleged billions of pesos contained therein.

Likewise, Duterte alleged that Trillanes closed his accounts in DBS Bank days before going to Singapore and then showed that there were no such accounts. However, DBS Bank disputed this and clarified that account closures cannot be done online.

In an attempt to silence Trillanes's exposés against President Duterte, his administration filed and revived at least 14 cases against Trillanes. On July 19, 2019, the PNP–Criminal Investigation and Detection Group (CIDG) filed charges against Trillanes and other members of the opposition for "sedition, cyber libel, libel, estafa, harboring a criminal, and obstruction of justice". On February 10, 2020, Trillanes and 10 others were indicted for "conspiracy to commit sedition" over an alleged ouster plot against Duterte.

In July 2024, Trillanes filed plunder charges against Senator Bong Go and former President Duterte, accusing Go of "unduly enriching himself" by allegedly using "his position, authority and influence to corner billions worth of government projects in favor of his father and brother". Trillanes further alleged that Go's father and brother were awarded ₱6.6 billion worth of government contracts. Trillanes based his case on a Philippine Center for Investigative Journalism 2018 report stating that CLTG Builders was awarded ₱4.6 billion government contracts while Alfrego Builders, owned by Go's brother, won ₱1.74 billion worth of projects. Trillanes also accused Go and Duterte of violating Republic Act No. 3019 (The Anti-Graft and Corrupt Practices Act) and Republic Act No. 6713 (The Code of Conduct and Ethical Standards for Public Officials and Employees).

Trillanes also filed a drug smuggling case with the Department of Justice against Paolo Duterte, Nicanor Faeldon, Mans Carpio, former National Commission on Indigenous Peoples former head, Allen Capuyan, Davao City Councilor Nilo "Small" Abellera Jr., Charlie Tan, and four others. The complaint is anchored on the 2017 drug smuggling scandal where ₱6.4-billion methamphetamine shipment was seized in Valenzuela, Metro Manila. In December 2018, Trillanes posted a bail of ₱96,000 before the Pasay City Regional Trial Court Branch 118 for the four counts of libel filed by Paolo Duterte, following Trillanes' investigation into the smuggling scandal.

Trillanes furthermore filed with the DOJ plunder under Republic Act No. 7080 and graft cases against Rodrigo Duterte, Bong Go, and Robert Empedrad regarding the allegedly anomalous ₱16-billion contract of two frigates BRP Jose Rizal (FF-150) and BRP Antonio Luna (FF-151) with HD Hyundai Heavy Industries. Emperad denied the accusation for it was signed two years after his retirement.

==== Revocation of amnesty by President Duterte ====
On August 31, 2018, President Rodrigo Duterte signed Proclamation No. 572, revoking Trillanes's amnesty. Duterte ordered the Department of Justice and the Armed Forces of the Philippines (AFP) to review all criminal cases in relation to the 2003 Oakwood mutiny and 2007 Peninsula siege. Shortly after that, Trillanes told to the reporters that he would not evade the case and he also told to Duterte that he is not afraid of him. The amnesty (Proclamation No 50) was granted by then-President Benigno Aquino III and later issued Proclamation 75 superseding Proclamation no. 50 back in 2010.

On September 7, the DOJ filed the application for an arrest and hold departure against Trillanes and it was signed at Makati Regional Trial Court Branch 150 by Acting Prosecutor General Richard Fadullon as "very urgent". On September 25, Trillanes posted a bail worth ₱200,000 on rebellion charges after undergoing booking procedures with his mug shots taken at the Makati City Police Station.

Opposition politicians expressed condemnation over the revocation of the amnesty: Magdalo Representative Gary Alejano, who also led the mutiny with Trillanes, calls it "political persecution" of Duterte's critics and he also slammed Duterte for what was called a "clear act of revenge" against Trillanes. Akbayan Representative Tom Villarin called the revocation "highly preposterous" and "clearly a political vendetta." On September 7, former Solicitor General Florin Hilbay said in an interview that the decision against Trillanes is similar to the case of Senator Leila de Lima, who was detained for allegedly violating the drug trafficking law almost a year and a half ago. Supporters of Trillanes gathered outside the Senate and held a vigil. Duterte severely lambasted Trillanes by describing the latter as "corrupt" and accused him of "abandoning" the military for his personal interests.

On October 22, The Regional Trial Court in Makati denied the government's petition to have Trillanes arrested, saying the coup d'état case against the senator was already dismissed on September 21, 2011, and that the dismissal was "final and executory".

In G.R. Nos. 241494, 256660 & 256078 (Sen. Antonio "Sonny" F. Trillanes IV v. Hon. Salvador C. Medialdea, et al; People of the Philippines v. Antonio F. Trillanes IV, People of the Philippines v. Antonio F. Trillanes IV), the Supreme Court En banc per ponente Maria Filomena Singh ruled on April 3, 2024, that "the amnesty granted to former senator Antonio F. Trillanes IV (Trillanes) is valid and that its revocation through Proclamation No. 572, issued by former President Rodrigo R. Duterte, is unconstitutional grounded on primacy of Article III – Bill of Rights". Trillanes, through his X account, thanked the Supreme Court for the decision and claimed that the amnesty revocation was made by Duterte, Salvador Medialdea, Menardo Guevarra, and Jose Calida "to silence and imprison opposition members."

==== Libel, cyber-libel lawsuits ====
On May 14, 2024, Trillanes IV filed defamation and cyberlibel complaint affidavits with the Quezon City Prosecutors's Office against Harry Roque, Guillermina Barrido, Sonshine Media Network International hosts and executives, and vlogger Lord Byron Cristobal, aka "Banat By". He also filed separate complaints with the National Bureau of Investigation against social media-citizen media account owners grounded on “persistent online attacks and spreading of false accusations.” Named defendants are Mr. Realtalker or Lods Chinito (with TikTok handles @chinitorealtalker and @chinitotisoy01); Melagin Nastor Evangelista or CATASTROPHE (with X handle @gurlbehindthisb); JoeLas (with X handle “@j_laspinas), Michael Gorre or KampilaBoy (with X handle @KampilanBoy); Hampaslupang Mandaragat (with X handle @JohnAmasa2); and X handle @SaraAll2028.

==== ICC arrest warrant attempt on Dela Rosa (2026) ====
In May 2026, Trillanes accompanied agents of the National Bureau of Investigation (NBI) to the Senate during attempts to serve an International Criminal Court (ICC) arrest warrant against Senator Ronald "Bato" dela Rosa in connection with the Duterte administration's war on drugs. The incident resulted in a standoff inside the Senate compound.

== Personal life ==
Trillanes is married to Arlene G. Orejana, a PMA graduate. They have had three children, one of whom died just 21 days after birth.

The "IV" in his name is derived from being the fourth male child of his family, as all of his siblings are named after their father.

In February 2020, Trillanes launched his vlog TRx: Trillanes Explains, where he discusses pressing issues and releases exposés coursed through his social media accounts. He also revealed on his vlog that he was diagnosed with COVID-19 in August 2020; he was able to recover from the virus.

== Electoral history ==
Electoral history of Antonio Trillanes
| Year | Office | Party | Votes received | | | | Result |
| Year | Office | Party | Total | % | P. | Swing | Result |
|---|---|---|---|---|---|---|---|
| 2007 | Senator of the Philippines | UNO | 11,189,671 | 37.93% | 11th | —N/a | Won |
| 2013 | Senator of the Philippines | Nacionalista | 14,127,722 | 38.34% | 9th | +0.41 | Won |
| 2022 | Senator of the Philippines | Liberal | 8,630,272 | 15.54% | 21st | -22.80 | Lost |
| 2016 | Vice President of the Philippines | Independent | 868,501 | 2.11% | 5th | —N/a | Lost |
| 2025 | Mayor of Caloocan | Aksyon | 229,512 | 39.22% | 2nd | —N/a | Lost |
