= Iranun language =

Malayo-Polynesian language spoken in Southeast Asia

Iranun
- إيراناونساي
- Native to: Philippines; Malaysia
- Region: Southwest Mindanao; Sabah
- Ethnicity: Iranun
- Native speakers: (250,000 cited 1981)
- Language family: Austronesian: Malayo-Polynesian; Philippine; Greater Central Philippine; Danao; Maranao–Iranun; Iranun
- Writing system: Latin historically written in Jawi

Official status
- Official language in: Regional language in the Philippines
- Regulated by: Komisyon sa Wikang Filipino

Language codes
- ISO 639-3: Either: ilp – Philippine Iranun ilm – Malaysian Iranun
- Glottolog: iran1262
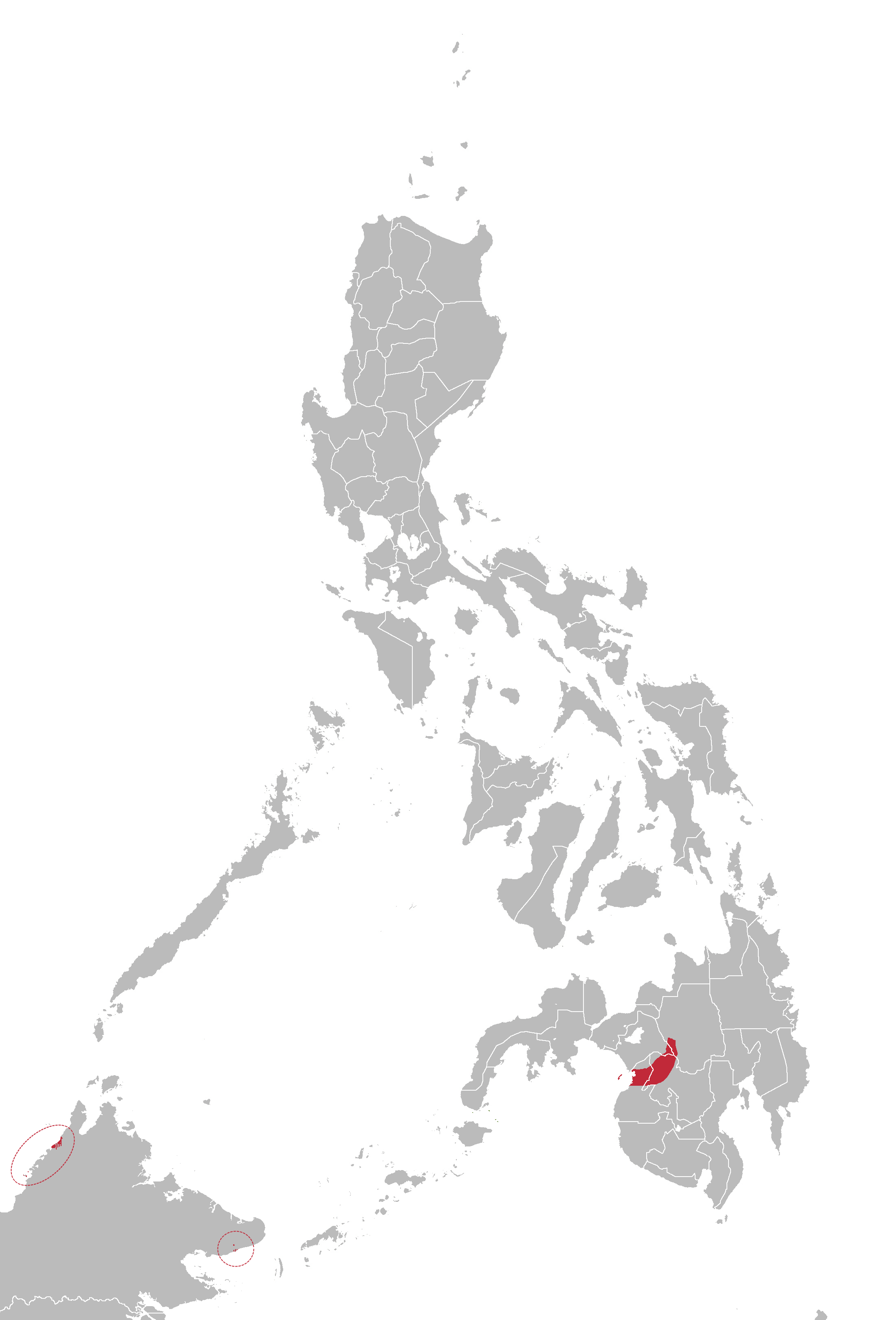
- Areas where Iranun is spoken

The Iranun language (Jawi: إيراناونساي), also known as Iranon or Illanun, is an Austronesian language belonging to the Danao languages spoken in the provinces of Maguindanao del Norte and other part of Lanao del Sur and Lanao del Norte, coastal municipalities of Zamboanga del Sur from Tukuran to Dumalinao, and Cotabato in southern Philippines and the Malaysian state of Sabah. It is the second most spoken language in Maguindanao del Norte after the Maguindanao language.

== Distribution ==
Iranun is spoken in the following areas:

- Maguindanao del Norte: Barira, Buldon, Parang, Matanog, Sultan Mastura, and Sultan Kudarat
- Cotabato: Alamada, Banisilan, Carmen, Libungan, and Pigcawayan
- Lanao del Norte: Sultan Naga Dimaporo, Kauswagan, Kolambugan, and Iligan
- Lanao del Sur: Kapatagan, Balabagan, Malabang, Amai Manabilang, Wao, and Picong
- Bukidnon: Kalilangan
- Zamboanga del Sur: Pagadian, San Pablo, Dumalinao, Dimataling, Labangan, and Tukuran
- Sabah, Malaysia: Kota Belud, Lahad Datu, and Kota Kinabalu.

== Phonology ==
=== Consonants ===
		Labial	Alveolar	Palatal	Velar
Plosive	voiceless	p	t		k
Plosive	voiced	b	d		ɡ
Nasal		m	n		ŋ
Fricative			s		
Trill			r		
Lateral			l		
Approximant		w		j	

=== Vowels ===
	Front	Central	Back
Close	i	ɨ	u
Open		a	

Sounds /i, u, a/ can also have allophones of [ɪ, e], [o], [ʌ], among speakers.
