= Malabang =

Municipality in Lanao del Sur, Philippines

Malabang ملابانج
- Municipality
- Municipality of Malabang
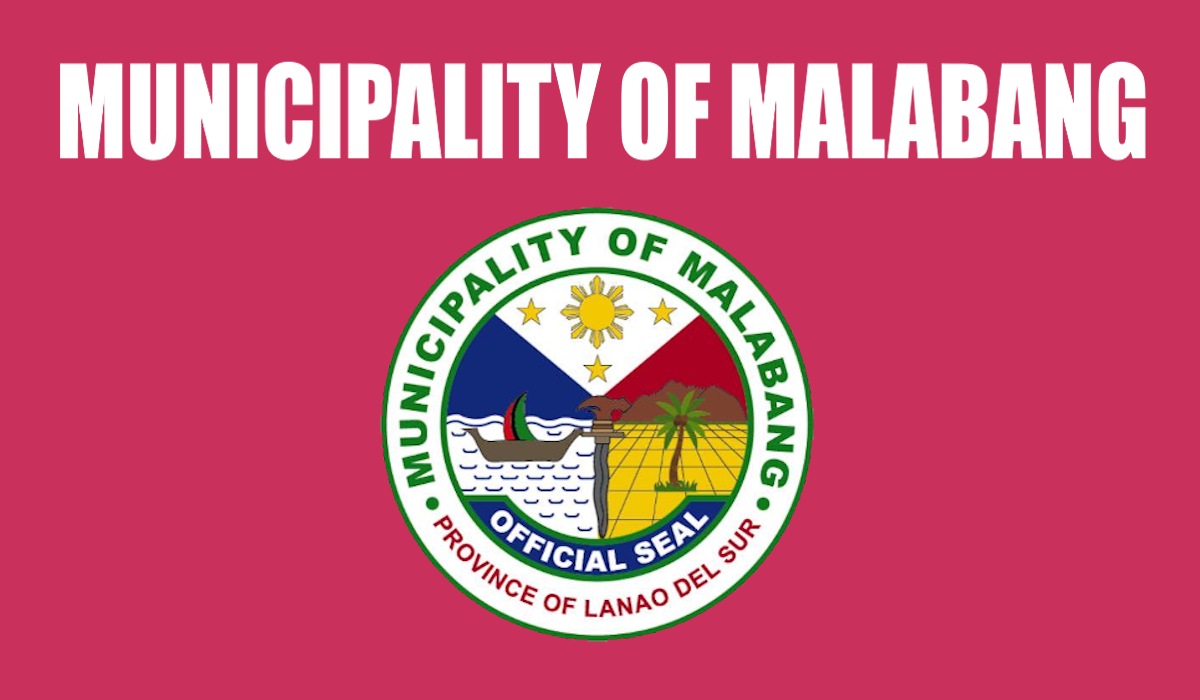
- Flag Seal

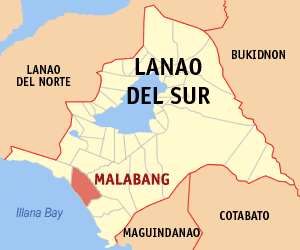
- Map of Lanao del Sur with Malabang highlighted
- Interactive map of Malabang
- Location within the Philippines
- Country: Philippines
- Region: Bangsamoro Autonomous Region in Muslim Mindanao
- Province: Lanao del Sur
- House district: 2nd district
- Parliamentary district: 8th district
- Founded: 1520
- Chartered: May 19, 1893
- Barangays: 37 (see Barangays)

Government
  - Type: Sangguniang Bayan
  - Mayor: Amin D. Balindong
  - Vice Mayor: Raizoli S. Balindong
  - House Representative: Yasser A. Balindong
  - Municipal Council: Members: Farrajibah D. Padate; Al-Fayeez T. Taog; Altaf D. Balindong; Alimoden B. Santican; Malic A. Balindong; Jerry M. Rakim; Ahmad Refaye B. Bugabong; Omaima M. Dipatuan
  - Electorate: 33,585 voters (2025)

Area
  - Total: 198.10 km^{2} (76.49 sq mi)
- Elevation: 61 m (200 ft)
- Highest elevation: 327 m (1,073 ft)
- Lowest elevation: 0 m (0 ft)

Population (2024 census)
  - Total: 58,377
  - Density: 294.68/km^{2} (763.23/sq mi)
  - Households: 7,647

Economy
  - Income class: 1st municipal income class
  - Poverty incidence: 17.49% (2023)
  - Revenue: ₱ 226.4 million (2024)
  - Assets: ₱ 232.8 million (2024)
  - Expenditure: ₱ 190.7 million (2024)
  - Liabilities: ₱ 49.16 million (2024)

Service provider
  - Electricity: Lanao del Sur Electric Cooperative (LASURECO)
  - Telecommunications: PLDT, SMART Telecom, Globe
- Time zone: UTC+8 (PST)
- ZIP code: 9300
- PSGC: 1903615000
- IDD : area code: +63 (0)63
- Native languages: Maranao; Tagalog
- Major religions: Islam, Roman Catholicism
- Website: malabang.com.ph

Malabang, officially the Municipality of Malabang (Maranao: Inged a Malabang; Tagalog: Bayan ng Malabang), is a municipality in the province of Lanao del Sur, Philippines. According to the 2024 census, it has a population of 58,377 people. The town is one of the two former capitals of the Sultanate of Maguindanao from 1515 until the Spanish conquered the land in 1888.

== History ==
Malabang, in Lanao del Sur, is considered the oldest settlement in mainland Mindanao.

The Sultanate of T'bok was an established kingdom in present-day Malabang long before the Philippines became a country. The people of Malabang are mostly Maranaos, a southern Mindanao ethnicity; they are also often identified with the Iranuns because of Iranuns who live in some of the barangays in the southern part of Malabang, comprising what is now Balabagan. In March 1969, Executive Order 386, signed by President Carlos P. Garcia, reconstituted the southern part of Malabang as the Municipality of Balabagan. Thus, Iranuns are now residents of Balabagan rather than Malabang.

Malabang played a significant part in the early battles against invaders of the Philippines. During the defensive campaigns against Spain, Malabang became the headquarters of Sultan Muhammad Kudarat of Maguindanao. He used to spend time recuperating in Malabang throughout the period when he was fighting to defend Maguindanao against invasion. He later retired to Malabang when he fell ill. He eventually died and was buried there. In May 1977, Presidential Decree 1135 of President Ferdinand Marcos created the Municipality of Picong (formerly Sultan Gumander) out of the north-western portion of Malabang, where Sultan Kudarat's grave was located.

During the Second World War, when the Japanese invaded the Philippines, the Japanese military built a large camp in Malabang, including a network of tunnels around it. It was considered a major camp of the Japanese forces. In 1942, the Philippine Supreme Court Chief Justice José Abad Santos was brought to this camp, after he was captured in Cebu while fleeing from Japanese forces. Chief Justice Abad Santos was executed in the camp for refusing to cooperate with the Japanese, and was buried in barangay Curahab. The place where the camp is situated and where Mr. Santos was executed was later on named Camp Jose Abad Santos (Camp JAS).

In 1945, United States and Philippine Commonwealth forces, working with Maranao guerillas, occupied Malabang after a siege. During the Siege of Malabang, the guerillas used weapons like the Maranao kris, barong and kampilan to fight the Japanese forces. The victorious American and Philippine Commonwealth troops, together with their Maranao guerrilla allies, eventually defeated the Japanese Imperial forces. When the built of the general headquarters and military camp base of the Philippine Commonwealth Army and Philippine Constabulary was station's active in Malabang from 1945 to 1946 during and ended of World War II.

Malabang as a municipality was founded on March 1, 1893. The locals of the town celebrate the founding day, the Araw ng Malabang every March 1 annually.

== Geography ==
Malabang is one of thirty-nine municipalities comprising the province of Lanao del Sur in northern Mindanao. It lies on the south-west part of the province and belongs to the second district. It has 37 barangays with a total land area of 37,789.28 km^{2}. The distance from Marawi City to Malabang is 71 kilometers. Malabang is bounded on the north by the municipality of Calanogas; on the north-west by the municipality of Picong (Sultan Gumander); on the east by the municipality of Marogong; and on the south by the municipality of Balabagan. To the west of Malabang is Illana Bay.

It is under the administrative supervision of the Autonomous Region in Muslim Mindanao (ARMM) since November 1989, pursuant to R.A. No. 6734 dated June 8, 1989, known as the "Organic Act of ARM M".

The municipality is a level plain in its central to southern portion. A slope in the north is bounded by the Municipality of Calanogas. There is also a slope in eastern Malabang.

=== Barangays ===
Malabang is politically subdivided into 37 barangays. Each barangay consists of puroks while some have sitios.

- Bacayawan
- Badak Lumao
- Bagoaingud
- Banday
- Betayan
- Boniga
- BPS Village
- Bunk House
- Cabasaran (South)
- Calibagat
- Calumbog
- Campo Muslim
- China Town (Poblacion)
- Corahab
- Diamaro
- Inandayan
- Jose Abad Santos
- Lamin
- Mable
- Macuranding
- Madaya
- Mananayo
- Manggahan
- Masao
- Matalin
- Matampay
- Matling
- Montay
- Pasir
- Pialot
- Rebocun
- Sarang
- Sumbagarogong
- Tacub
- Tambara
- Tiongcop
- Tuboc

=== Climate ===
Climate data for Malabang, Lanao del Sur
Month	Jan	Feb	Mar	Apr	May	Jun	Jul	Aug	Sep	Oct	Nov	Dec	Year
Mean daily maximum °C (°F)	30 (86)	30 (86)	31 (88)	31 (88)	30 (86)	30 (86)	29 (84)	29 (84)	30 (86)	30 (86)	30 (86)	30 (86)	30 (86)
Mean daily minimum °C (°F)	24 (75)	24 (75)	25 (77)	25 (77)	26 (79)	25 (77)	25 (77)	25 (77)	25 (77)	25 (77)	25 (77)	25 (77)	25 (77)
Average precipitation mm (inches)	236 (9.3)	225 (8.9)	244 (9.6)	235 (9.3)	304 (12.0)	287 (11.3)	200 (7.9)	175 (6.9)	158 (6.2)	200 (7.9)	287 (11.3)	243 (9.6)	2,794 (110.2)
Average rainy days	24.3	22.3	26.0	27.2	28.3	27.2	25.8	24.8	22.2	25.4	27.2	25.8	306.5
Source: Meteoblue (modeled/calculated data, not measured locally)

== Demographics ==
Population census of Malabang
Year	Pop.	±% p.a.
1903	164	—
1918	980	+12.66%
1939	10,210	+11.81%
1948	10,380	+0.18%
1960	27,152	+8.34%
1970	28,692	+0.55%
1975	32,618	+2.61%
1980	18,955	−10.28%
1990	25,714	+3.10%
1995	28,840	+2.17%
2000	33,177	+3.05%
2007	41,024	+2.97%
2010	38,724	−2.08%
2015	43,957	+2.44%
2020	49,088	+2.35%
2024	58,377	+4.25%
Source: Philippine Statistics Authority

=== Religions ===
Religion in Malabang Lanao del Sur
Religion	Percent
Islam	98.7%
Christianity	1.26%

=== Languages ===
The languages spoken in Malabang vary by location and by barangay. Maranao is the most commonly spoken language in Malabang, as the native speakers are the original inhabitants of Malabang.

Cebuano is spoken in some barangays with significant Cebuano Visayan immigrant populations who are mostly Catholic Christians. Along with English, Cebuano is used in Catholic masses and religious services as Malabang is part of the Prelature of Marawi, subject to the Archdiocese of Ozamis.

Some descendants of Chinese settlers in China Town (Poblacion) speak Mandarin and to some degree, Hokkien.

English is also a commonly spoken language due to American settlers in Matalin and European missionaries, and is also the medium of instruction and working language of the municipal government. Arabic is used in madrassas and spoken by qualified local and visiting ustadz (Islamic scholar) and imams. Settlers from the Maguindanao, Samal and Tausūg ethnic groups in barangay Bunkhouse still use their tribal tongues.

Although there are no settlers from the Tagalog region in Lanao del Sur, Tagalog is still used in schools, being the national language of the Philippines through its national register Filipino. It is also the alternative language of the Maranao townsfolk when conversing with Visayans, as it is a national language spoken across the country

Other languages varyingly spoken include Ilocano, Hiligaynon, Bicolano, Higaonon, and Iranun.

== Economy ==
Poverty Incidence of Malabang

Source: Philippine Statistics Authority

Agriculture and fishery are the major resources of Malabang. They are also widely known for coconut production. Warehouses of coconut can be found along the major highways of Malabang. Mills in barangay Matalin produce cassava flour. Other agricultural products produced in Malabang include corn, vegetables and rice. Malabang also plays a major role in fishery production. They are known for puzan (a preserved fish product) and bakas (smoked dried fish). Malabang is central to commerce and trade activity in the coastal area of Lanao del Sur.

== Government ==
The municipality has a mayor, the head of the municipality of Malabang, a municipal vice mayor, and eight municipal councilors. The municipality also has one Sangguniang Kabataan (youth council) representative and one ABC representative from the Punong Barangay (barangay captains).

=== List of Mayors ===
- 1939–1942, Naguib Juanday (First elected mayor)
- 1942–1944, Datu Sampiano (First appointed mayor)
- 1944–1945, Gandamasir Diambangan (Appointed)
- 1945–1946, Matling Darnang (Appointed)
- 1946–1947, Datu Boloto Paramata (Appointed)
- 1947–1948, Naguib Juanday (Appointed)
- 1948-1952, Ismael Marohom
- 1952–1956, Datu Macaorao Balindong
- 1956–1960, Datu Macaorao Balindong
- 1960–1964, Datu Macaorao Balindong
- 1964–1968, Amir M. Balindong
- 1968–1972, Amir M. Balindong
- 1972–1976, Amir M. Balindong
- 1976–1980, Macud Bangon Santican (Appointed)
- 1980–1986, Macud Bangon Santican
- 1986–1988, Anwar B. Balindong (Appointed)
- 1988–1992, Anwar B. Balindong
- 1992–1995, Anwar B. Balindong
- 1995–1998, Anwar B. Balindong
- 1998–2001, Amir-Oden S. Balindong
- 2001–2004, Anwar B. Balindong
- 2004–2007, Anwar B. Balindong
- 2007–2010, Anwar B. Balindong
- 2010–2013, Omensalam S. Balindong
- 2013–2016, Omensalam S. Balindong
- 2016–2019, Omensalam S. Balindong
- 2019–2022, Mohamad Yahya B. Macapodi
- 2022–2025, Alinader M. Balindong
- 2025–present, Amin D. Balindong

== Infrastructure ==
=== Transportation ===
Land Transport
Malabang is quite sufficient when it comes to land transportation to the nearby municipalities. Tricycles are the most-commonly-used transportation around the town. Usually, in the elevated part of Malabang, public transportation such as town ace and multi-cab are used. There are also public utility vans and jeepneys available to nearby cities and municipalities.

Air Transport
Malabang Airport is the small airport of Malabang in the province of Lanao del Sur. It has IATA code MLP, GPS Code RPMM, an elevation of 27 feet (8.2 meters), latitude 7.6172 and longitude 124.059. This airport is classified as a secondary airport, or a minor commercial airport, by the Philippine Air Transportation Office. Its runway is 4,265 feet (1,300 meters) long. Malabang Airport is the only airport in the province. As of 2015, no airlines serve this airport.

Sea Transport
Malabang has only a small seaport. Daily coastal launches connect Malabang with Cotabato City, Maguindanao del Norte. Privately owned boats and rental boats are available for sea travel.

=== Medical Services ===
Dr. Serapio B. Montañer Memorial District Hospital or known to many as Mabul Hospital is the public hospital in Malabang, and is listed as a secondary hospital in the province. There are also several municipal private clinics in Malabang.

=== Telecommunications ===
The Philippine Long Distance Telephone Company provides fixed line services. Wireless mobile communications services are provided by Smart Communications and Globe Telecommunications.

== Education ==
Although listed as 4th class municipality, all levels of education are attainable in Malabang, a center of learning in the coastal area of Lanao del Sur. Multiple colleges are present, including the community branch of Mindanao State University. Arabic studies are also offered at all levels. Other notable secondary school in Malabang is Our Lady of Peace High School, a Catholic school and Malabang National High School
