= Wao, Lanao del Sur =

Municipality in Lanao del Sur, Philippines

Wao واعو
- Municipality
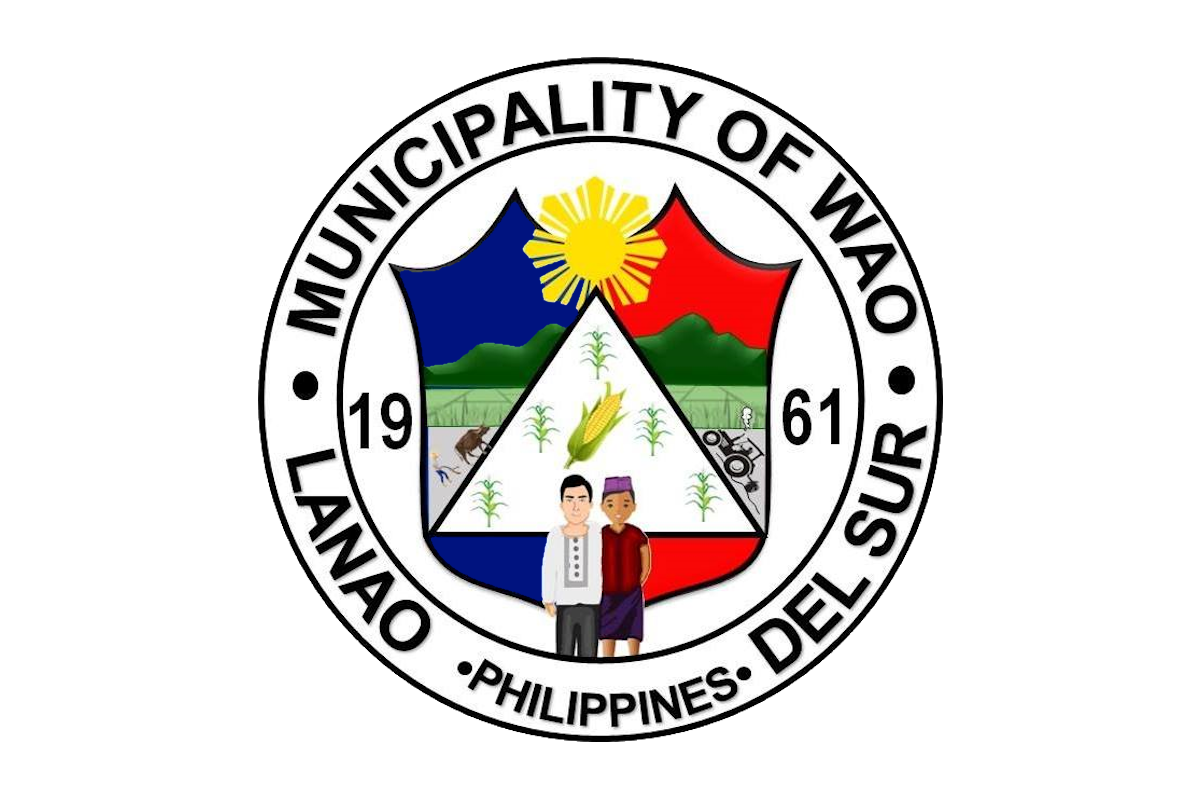
- Flag Seal

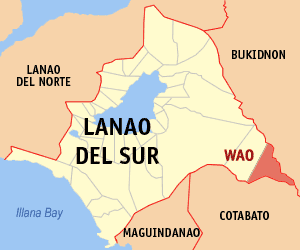
- Map of Lanao del Sur with Wao highlighted
- Interactive map of Wao
- Location within the Philippines
- Coordinates: 7°38′25″N 124°43′33″E
- Country: Philippines
- Region: Bangsamoro Autonomous Region in Muslim Mindanao
- Province: Lanao del Sur
- House district: 1st district
- Parliamentary district: 9th district
- Founded: February 22, 1961
- Barangays: 26 (see Barangays)

Government
  - Type: Sangguniang Bayan
  - Mayor: Elvino B. Balicao Jr.
  - Vice Mayor: Elmer A. Mendoza
  - House Representative: Ziaur-Rahman A. Adiong
  - Municipal Council: Members: Rex R. Wagas; Rolly A. Caballes; Dennis L. Angeles; Dante D. Doletin Sr.; Nasrodin P. Macadato; Mary Ruth C. Catalan; Salic A. Abantas Jr.; Jamal H. Adiong
  - Electorate: 35,606 voters (2025)

Area
  - Total: 485.24 km^{2} (187.35 sq mi)
- Elevation: 603 m (1,978 ft)
- Highest elevation: 1,108 m (3,635 ft)
- Lowest elevation: 393 m (1,289 ft)

Population (2024 census)
  - Total: 51,081
  - Density: 105.27/km^{2} (272.65/sq mi)
  - Households: 9,720

Economy
  - Income class: 1st municipal income class
  - Poverty incidence: 16% (2023)
  - Revenue: ₱ 317.8 million (2024)
  - Assets: ₱ 773.9 million (2024)
  - Expenditure: ₱ 261.7 million (2024)
  - Liabilities: ₱ 116.6 million (2024)

Service provider
  - Electricity: First Bukidnon Electric Cooperative (FIBECO)
- Time zone: UTC+8 (PST)
- ZIP code: 9716
- PSGC: 1903630000
- IDD : area code: +63 (0)63
- Native languages: Maranao; Iranun; Cebuano; Tagalog
- Major religions: Roman Catholicism, Islam
- Website: www.wao-lds.gov.ph

Wao, officially the Municipality of Wao (Maranao/Iranun: Inged a Wao; Cebuano: Lungsod sa Wao; Hiligaynon: Banwa sang Wao; Tagalog: Bayan ng Wao), is a municipality in the province of Lanao del Sur, Philippines. According to the 2024 census, it has a population of 51,081 people. Wao is the only Christian-majority municipality in its province. Wao is a diverse community, with different ethniolinguistic groups such as Hiligaynon, Ilocano, Iranun, Cebuano, Maranao, Talaandig, Ivatan, and Tagalog residing in the area. Hiligyanon is the dominant language spoken among the residents of the municipality. Wao is now a First Class Municipality.

== Etymology ==
There are three possible etymology for the name of the municipality Wao. One is a local folklore which involved Bai Sa Raya, a Moro princess from a monarchy in Cotabato who coincidentally visited the area which is now known as "Wao" during a serious drought. This led to the place being called Wao from the word kawaw or uhaw in the local language, which roughly translates to "I am thirsty". Another theory is that the place was named after a former creek in Eastern Wao, which was extant prior to the arrival of Christian settlers in the 1950s. A third theory is that the name of the town was derived from the Maranao word liawao, which means "high place". This is a reference to a Moro settlement existing in the current-day poblacion during the pre-1950 settlement era. Other nearby settlements are situated at a lower elevation than Liawao.

== History ==
The LASEDECO resettlement program of then-President Ramon Magsaysay made possible the foundation of Wao as a municipality in Lanao del Sur province on February 22, 1961. The first settlers in the area were sixty families of various ethnicities from the then-undivided Cotabato province. Only one person among the 1st batch of settlers, Elvino B. Balicao Sr., became one of the Municipal Mayors of Wao. Balicao, along with members of the 1st batch of 60 settlers that included the late couple Aludio and Sofia Emborgo, were welcomed by the native Muslim inhabitants of Wao led by Sultan Mamaco Saripada, the municipality's first appointed and elected mayor, Datu Tao Pagul and Datu Maki Saripada. They were treated to a sit-down meal in the house of Sultan Mamaco Saripada.

In the late 1970s, the town experienced intercommunal violence between its native Moro community and the Christian settlers. Tensions arose after Bumbaran (now known as Amai Manabilang) was created from Wao by President Ferdinand Marcos through Presidential Decree No. 1243 on November 17, 1977.

In 2024, a new municipality named Pilintangan or Saripada was proposed to be carved from Wao in the Bangsamoro Parliament, which would entail the loss of 11 barangays. This proposal was met with protests and opposition, fearing that this might cause a repeat of the violence the town experienced in the 1970s. Wao's mayor, Elvino Balicao Jr., also warned that the division would reduce the town into a third-class municipality due to reduced revenues and with most of its government buildings being located in the barangays to be separated.

== Geography ==
Wao is also surrounded by Amai Manabilang in the north and west, Bukidnon in the east, and Cotabato in the south. Its border with Bukidnon is demarcated by the Maradugao River.

=== Barangays ===
Wao is politically subdivided into 26 barangays. Each barangay consists of puroks while some have sitios.

- Amoyong
- Balatin
- Banga
- Buntongan
- Bo-ot
- Cebuano Group
- Christian Village
- Eastern Wao (Poblacion)
- Extension (Poblacion)
- Gata (Pizawaoan)
- Kabatangan
- Kadingilan
- Katutungan
- Kilikili East
- Kilikili West
- Malaigang
- Manila Group (Poblacion)
- Milaya
- Mimbuaya
- Muslim Village
- Pagalongan
- Panang
- Park Area
- Pilintangan
- Serran Village
- Western Wao (Poblacion)

=== Climate ===
Climate data for Wao, Lanao de Sur
| Month | Jan | Feb | Mar | Apr | May | Jun | Jul | Aug | Sep | Oct | Nov | Dec | Year |
|---|---|---|---|---|---|---|---|---|---|---|---|---|---|
| Mean daily maximum °C (°F) | 24 (75) | 24 (75) | 25 (77) | 26 (79) | 26 (79) | 25 (77) | 25 (77) | 25 (77) | 25 (77) | 25 (77) | 25 (77) | 25 (77) | 25 (77) |
| Mean daily minimum °C (°F) | 20 (68) | 20 (68) | 20 (68) | 20 (68) | 21 (70) | 21 (70) | 20 (68) | 20 (68) | 20 (68) | 21 (70) | 20 (68) | 20 (68) | 20 (69) |
| Average precipitation mm (inches) | 159 (6.3) | 143 (5.6) | 166 (6.5) | 183 (7.2) | 357 (14.1) | 414 (16.3) | 333 (13.1) | 309 (12.2) | 289 (11.4) | 285 (11.2) | 253 (10.0) | 166 (6.5) | 3,057 (120.4) |
| Average rainy days | 18.4 | 17.2 | 20.6 | 23.4 | 29.3 | 29.2 | 29.9 | 29.4 | 27.7 | 28.7 | 25.5 | 19.9 | 299.2 |
Source: Meteoblue (modeled/calculated data, not measured locally)

== Demographics ==
=== Religions ===
Religion in Wao, Lanao del Sur
| Religion | Percent |
| Christianity | 84% |
| Islam | 16% |

Wao is the only predominantly Christian municipality in Lanao del Sur, with 80% of the population adhering to Roman Catholicism as of 2017, brought by settlers who came from Luzon, Visayas and other parts of Mindanao. The Roman Catholic church administrates its constituents in Wao as part of the Bukidnon-based Diocese of Malaybalay.

Among the significant ethnic groups in Wao are the Ilonggo, Ilocano, Cebuano, Maranao, Iranun, Ivatan, and Tagalog peoples.

Population census of Wao
| Year | Pop. | ±% p.a. |
|---|---|---|
| 1960 | 13,848 | — |
| 1970 | 16,577 | +1.81% |
| 1975 | 17,267 | +0.82% |
| 1980 | 15,962 | −1.56% |
| 1990 | 22,932 | +3.69% |
| 1995 | 27,503 | +3.46% |
| 2000 | 35,517 | +5.63% |
| 2007 | 42,186 | +2.40% |
| 2010 | 40,479 | −1.49% |
| 2015 | 45,862 | +2.41% |
| 2020 | 50,366 | +1.99% |
| 2024 | 51,081 | +0.34% |
Source: Philippine Statistics Authority

== Economy ==
Poverty Incidence of Wao

Source: Philippine Statistics Authority

The Wao Development Corporation (WDC) maintains a pineapple plantation and package facility in Wao.

== Sister cities ==
- Quezon City, since April 1990
