= Illana Bay =

- Moro Bay, Iranun Bay
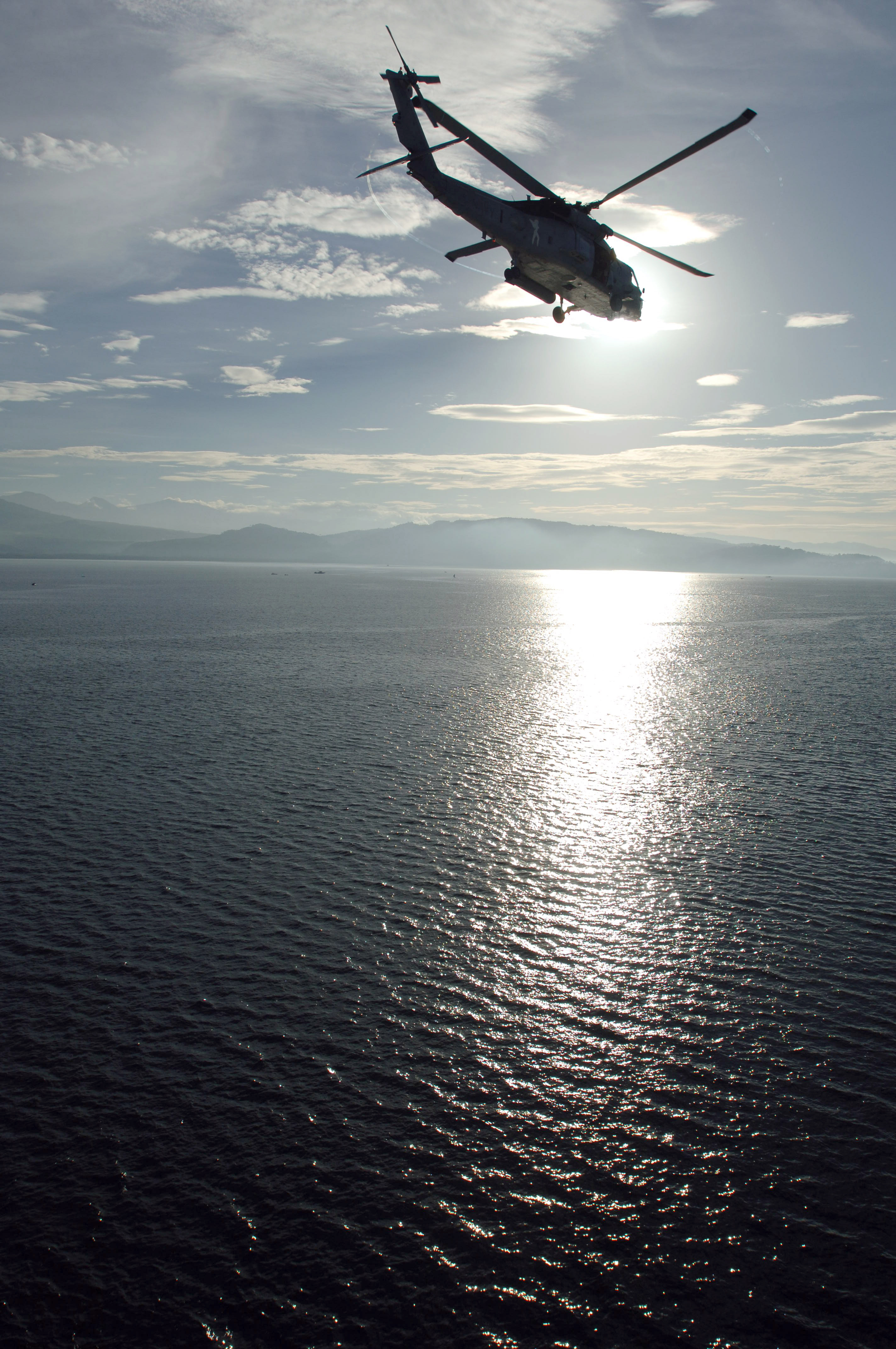
- A US Navy helicopter flies over the bay

- Location within the Philippines Illana Bay (Philippines)
- Location: Mindanao Island, Philippines
- Coordinates: 7°25′N 123°45′E
- Type: bay
- Part of: Moro Gulf
- Settlements: Balabagan; Cotabato City; Datu Blah T. Sinsuat; Datu Odin Sinsuat; Dimataling; Dinas; Dumalinao; Kapatagan; Labangan; Malabang; Matanog; Pagadian; Parang; San Pablo; Sultan Mastura; Sultan Naga Dimaporo; Tabina; Tukuran

Illana Bay, also known as Moro Bay, is a large bay of the Moro Gulf, off the southwestern coast of Mindanao island in the Philippines.

Historically, the body of water was known as Iranun Bay, named after the indigenous Iranun people who established their early settlements along its coast. The current name "Illana" is a Spanish colonial corruption of the word "Iranun".

Illana Bay and Moro Gulf form part of the Celebes Sea.

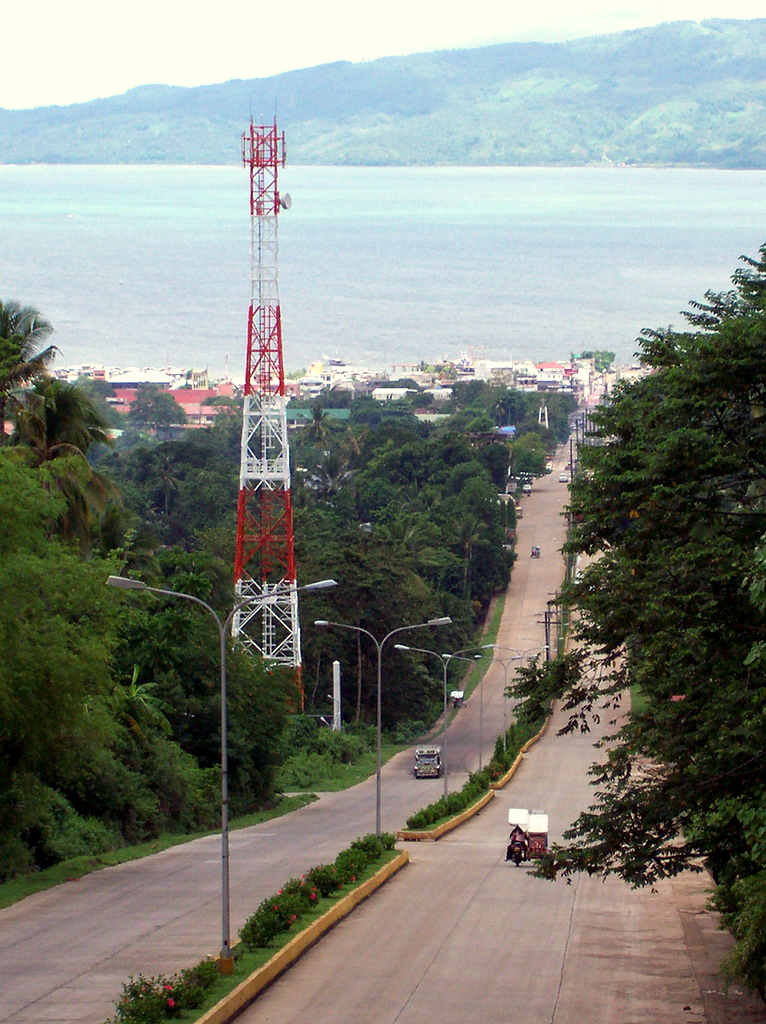
A view of the bay in the background from Pagadian City

== See also ==
- Sibuguey Bay — also of Moro Gulf
