= Chito Soganub =

Filipino Roman Catholic priest (1960–2020)

Chito Suganob
- Vicar General of the Prelature of Marawi
- Church: Marawi

Personal details
- Born: August 1, 1960
- Died: July 22, 2020 (aged 59) Norala, South Cotabato, Philippines
- Denomination: Roman Catholic

Fr. Teresito "Chito" Suganob (August 1, 1960 – July 22, 2020) was a Filipino Roman Catholic priest based in Marawi. He came into national public attention when he was taken hostage by ISIL-linked Maute group militants during the earlier period of the Battle of Marawi in May 2017.

Suganob was a native of Lambunao, Iloilo.

== Career ==
Suganob served as a priest at the Prelature of Marawi which serves both the city of Marawi and the province of Lanao del Norte. He was assigned at the Cathedral of Maria Auxiliadora. He worked with the Institute for Peace and Development in Mindanao along with Moctar Matuan, the organization's executive director, in monitoring governance in different municipalities. He also helped Henrietta de Villa in establishing a foothold for the Parish Pastoral Council for Responsible Voting in Lanao del Sur as well as in aiding victims of human trafficking in the province. He served as the Vicar General of Marawi, the right hand of Marawi Bishop Edwin dela Peña.

During Suganob’s early years of service in Marawi as a priest, Muslims were suspicious of the Prelature of Marawi's attempts to establish a dialogue between Muslims and Christians. According to Bishop dela Peña, when the September 11 attacks occurred in the United States, there was a greater need for Muslims to assert Islam as a "religion of peace" and said that this need is an opportunity for Muslims and Christians to "work together". The bishop described the timing of Soganub's arrival in Marawi as "just at the right moment".

Suganob also conducted programs in chaplaincy, education, interfaith dialogue and peace building at the Mindanao State University.

=== Captivity in Marawi ===
Amidst a battle between ISIL-linked Maute and Abu Sayyaf groups, and government forces in Marawi which commenced in May 2017, Chito Suganob was taken hostage along with 23 others by the Maute group at the Cathedral of Maria Auxiliadora on the eve of May 23, 2017 while they were preparing for a celebration of the Feast of Mary Help of Christians which was to take place on the next day. The church was later burned by the militants. Within the month, he appeared in a propaganda video pleading to President Rodrigo Duterte for his life as well as the lives of reportedly hundreds of others. He also echoed the demands of his captors to withdraw government forces from Marawi.

He, along with other hostages were fed by the militants with food from grocery stores, but their captors experienced a shortage as fighting increased. The hostages, Suganob included, were forcibly converted to Islam. Suganob also narrated how he was tasked to transport arms for the militants which were to be used against government troops.

According to a self-narrated account relayed to Bishop dela Pena, Suganob along with a Dansalan College teacher who was also taken hostage escaped early morning of September 17, 2017 from their captors and were found by the military who rescued them near the Bato Ali mosque. According to Presidential Peace Adviser Secretary Jesus Dureza, his companion and himself were rescued late night of September 16 following a military operation.

President Rodrigo Duterte said that Suganob was not released as a result of backdoor negotiations with militants answering to queries by the media.

=== Life after escape ===
Following his escape and rescue, he took a rest from his duties as priest. His programs and services at the Mindanao State University were handled by seconded priests and lay missionaries from the Redemptorist Missionaries in the Philippines, Caritas Cebu, and the Capiz Archdiocesan Social Action Center in Roxas City.

On September 18, 2017, military and defence officials officially presented Suganob to the media at Camp Aguinaldo in Quezon City.

After undergoing trauma healing Soganub was not given a new assignment or did he return to Marawi to continue his missionary work. He spent the later years of his life as a speaker sharing his experience in Marawi as a hostage by the Maute group.

== Religious views ==
Soganub made an effort to respect the way of living of Marawi's Muslim population. He avoided the public display of a crucifix including at the former Cathedral of Maria Auxiliadora and remarked that the cross is "planted deep in our hearts" as a compromise to "avoid arguments and to avoid further misunderstandings".

After his escape from the Maute, he reaffirmed his belief in good interfaith relations between Muslims and Christians. He also expressed his views on the similarities of Christianity and Islam believing that both adherents of the religion follow one God, the desire to live in peace, and the belief in the afterlife with Muslims believing that they can go to paradise while Christians believe in heaven. He always said that he still associated himself with Christians rather than with Muslims while expressing these beliefs.

The legitimacy of his conversion was dismissed. Autonomous Region in Muslim Mindanao Assemblyman Zia Alonto Adiong said that forced conversions are prohibited in Islam. Marawi Bishop Dela Pena said there was no confirmation of the conversion. He also added that such cannot be considered a "full conversion" when the act was done under duress and remarked that the Prelature of Marawi had not "abandoned" him.

== Personal life ==
Suganob was reportedly fluent in speaking the Maranao language. He maintained long hair and a beard as an effort to not alienate himself from Muslim ulamas who maintain their beards. As a result he was often mistaken as a Muslim. He also did not wear a crucifix or a cleric collar.

== Death ==
Suganob died from cardiac arrest on July 22, 2020, in his residence in Norala, South Cotabato. His remains were buried in the same town's public cemetery.

== See also ==
- List of kidnappings
- List of solved missing person cases (post-2000)
