= Iranun people =

Austronesian ethnic group of the southern Philippines and east Malaysia

Iranun
Ilanun
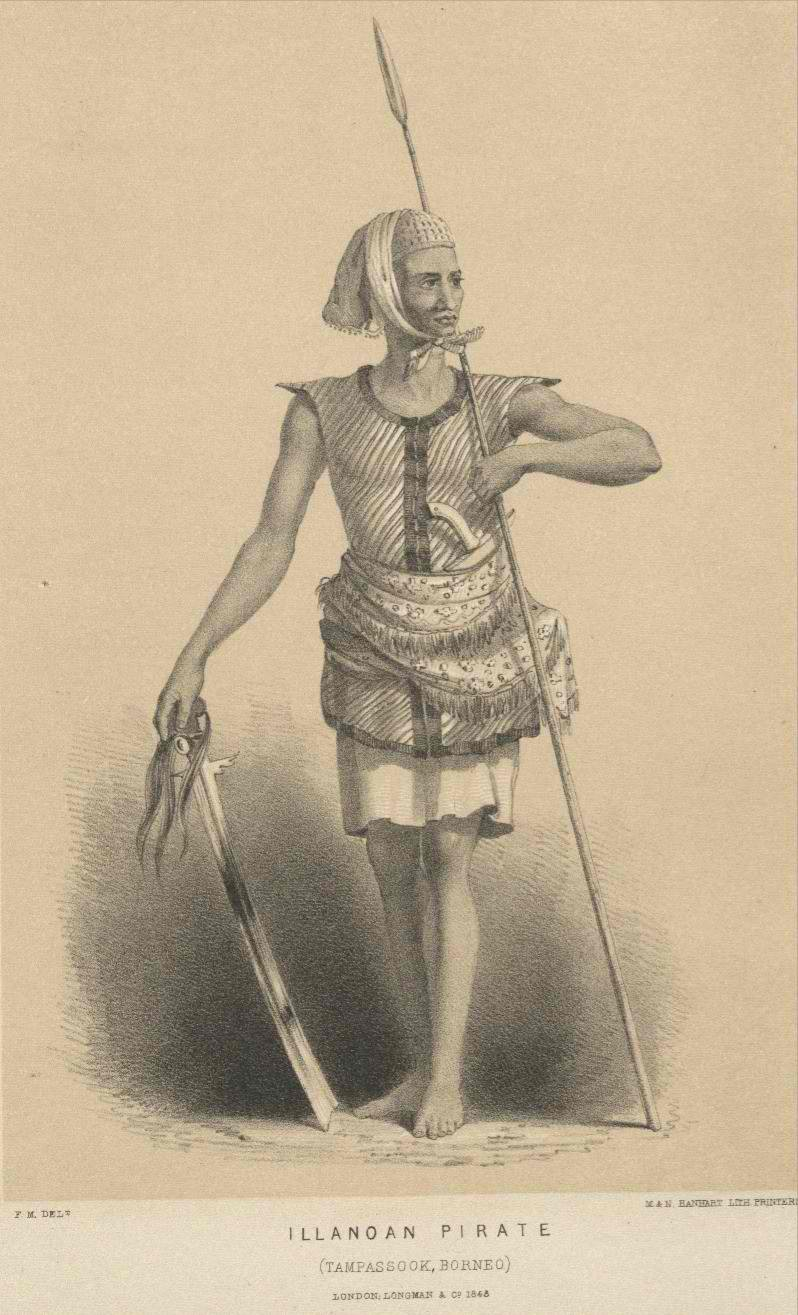
- A 19th-century illustration of an Iranun pirate

Regions with significant populations
- Philippines 333,454 (2020) (Bangsamoro, Soccsksargen, Northern Mindanao, Zamboanga Peninsula, Manila, Cebu) Malaysia 20,000–30,000 (2006) (Sabah)

Languages
- Native; Iranun; Also; Maguindanaon • Maranao • Hiligaynon • Cebuano • Chavacano • Filipino • Philippine English (Philippine Iranun); Sabah Malay • Malaysian Standard Malay • Malaysian English (Malaysian Iranun)

Religion
- Sunni Islam

Related ethnic groups
- Maranao, Maguindanaon, Sama-Bajau, other Moro peoples, other Austronesian peoples

The Iranun are a minority Austronesian ethnic group native to southwestern Mindanao, Philippines. They are ethnically and culturally closely related to the Maranao, and Maguindanaon, with all three groups speaking languages classified under the Danao language family. The Iranun are historically known for their sea exploits.

== Origins ==
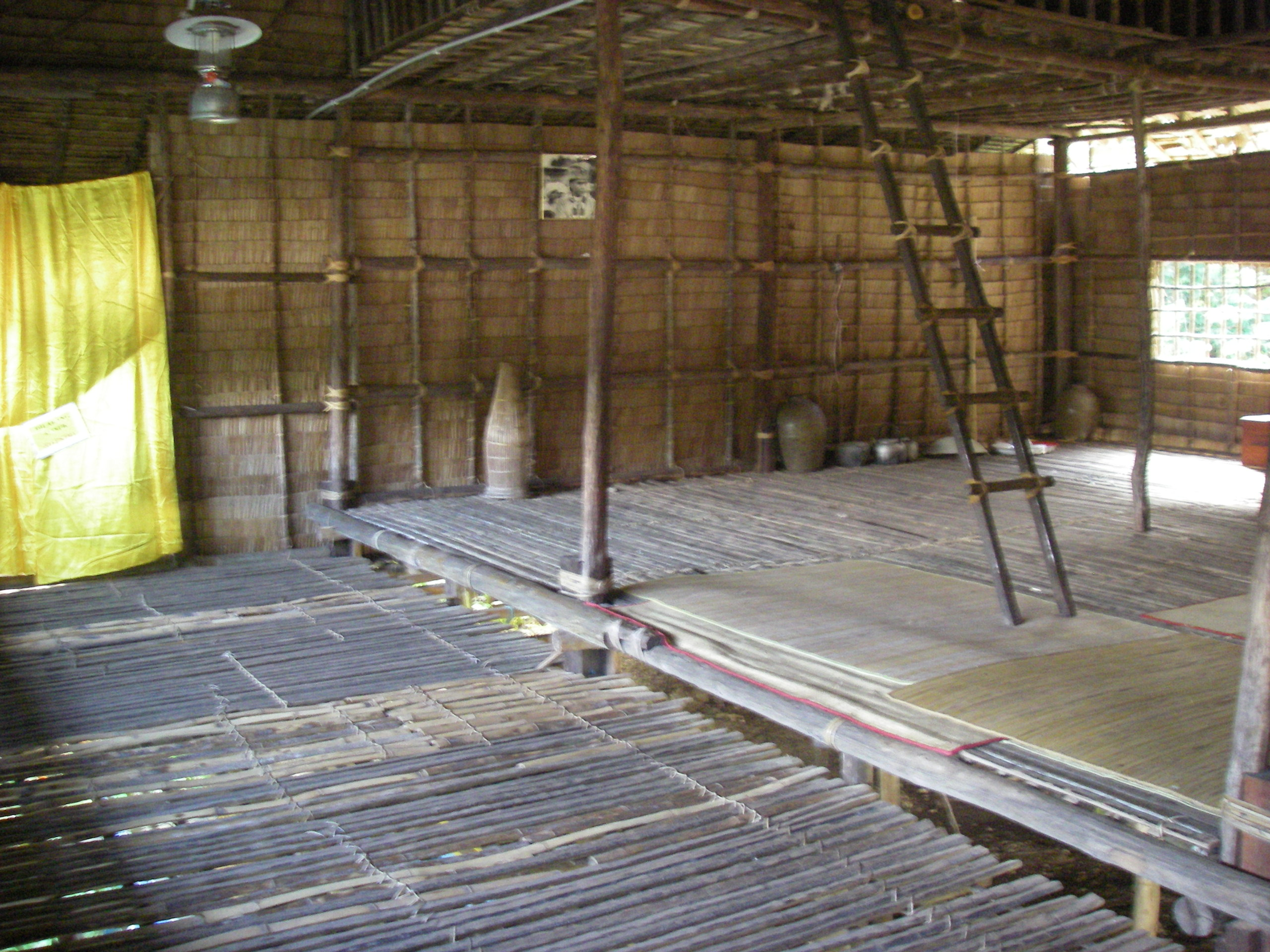
A traditional Iranun house in the Heritage Village of Kota Kinabalu, Sabah

The term Iranun is derived from Ilanun, which is associated with the Malay term Lanun, which means “pirate.” During the late 18th and 19th centuries, the Iranun became widely associated with this activity, contributing to the adoption Lanun as a generic Malay term for “pirate.”

== Regions ==
The Iranun are native to the southwestern regions of Mindanao. Iranun are found in Maguindanao del Norte (Barira, Buldon, Parang, Matanog), with a smaller community in Sultan Mastura, and Sultan Kudarat, Cotabato (Alamada, Banisilan, Carmen, Libungan, and Pigcawayan); Lanao del Norte (Kauswagan and Kolambugan); Lanao del Sur (Balabagan, Kapatagan, Bumbaran, and Picong); Bukidnon (Kalilangan); and Zamboanga del Sur (Pagadian City, San Pablo, Dumalinao, Dimataling and Tukuran).

From migrations further westward and southward in the 18th and 19th centuries, Iranun communities are also found in mainly present-day Sabah, Malaysia, making them one of the recent minority groups in the region. The west coast of Sabah (in which they are found in 25 villages around the Kota Belud and Lahad Datu districts). They have also settled in Kudat and Likas, Kota Kinabalu, in which they assimilated with the Sama-Bajau, owing to their shared naval history and Muslim religious beliefs and same ancestral roots in the Bangsamoro region of the Southern Philippines.

== History ==
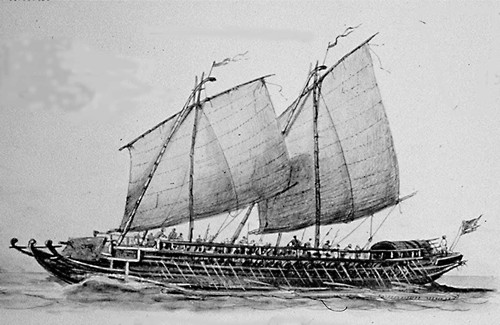
1890 illustration by Rafael Monleón of a late 18th-century Iranun lanong warship

=== Colonial Period (1565-1946) ===
For centuries, the Iranun were involved in pirate-related occupations in Southeast Asia. Most Iranuns are Muslim. Their language is part of the Austronesian family and is most closely related to the language of the Maranao people of Lanao. Historically, the Iranun were given the exonym Ilanun (also spelled variously as Illanun, Illanoan, Illanoon, Ilanoon, etc.) during the British colonial era. The Malay term Lanun (which came to mean "pirate") originated from the exonym.

In the case of inter-marriages of an Iranun woman and an outsider man, the cultural influences of the woman's family will be more dominant that the outsider man would be considered as an Iranun man; although in a lot of cases this does not happen.

Iranuns fought the Western invaders under the flag of the Maguindanao Sultanate. They formed part of the Moro resistance against the American occupation of the Philippines from 1899 to 1913. The Iranun were excellent in maritime activity as they are traditionally sailors and pirates. They used to ply the route connecting the South China Sea, Sulu Sea, Moro Gulf to Celebes Sea, and raided the Spanish held territories along the way. They also extensively mapped the waters of Southeast Asia, and possess notable material culture, such as the historically important Carta Indigena Filipina map, which shows their geographical knowledge and control over many of the region's seas and coasts.

== See also ==
- Sultanate of Maguindanao
- Sama-Bajau people
- Karakoa
- Garay (ship)
- Penjajap
