= Territorial Prelature of Marawi =

Latin Catholic ecclesiastical territory in the Philippines

Territorial Prelature of Saint Mary in Marawi Praelatura Territorialis Maraviensis Prelatura Teritoryal ng Marawi

Catholic
- Coat of arms

Location
- Country: Philippines
- Territory: Marawi City, Malabang, and Balabagan in Lanao del Sur; Sultan Naga Dimaporo and Balo-i in Lanao del Norte
- Ecclesiastical province: Ozamis
- Headquarters: Bishop's House; Saint Mary's Church Compound #0251-A, Bato Ali – Sen. Ahmad D. Alonto Sr. Streets, Moncado Colony, Marawi City 9700; Temporary: Santo Tomas del Villanueva Parish, Maria Cristina, Balo-i, Lanao del Norte
- Coordinates: 7°59′49″N 124°17′40″E

Statistics
- Area: 4,567 km^{2} (1,763 sq mi)
- Population: Total; Catholics: (as of 2021); 1,324,887; 35,500 (2.68%)
- Parishes: 4

Information
- Denomination: Catholic
- Sui iuris church: Latin Church
- Rite: Roman Rite
- Established: November 20, 1976
- Cathedral: Cathedral of Maria Auxiliadora
- Patron saint: Mary, Help of Christians; Thomas of Villanova
- Secular priests: 9
- Language: English, Filipino, Mindanao Cebuano, and Maranao

Current leadership
- Pope: Leo XIV
- Prelate: Edwin A. de la Peña, M.S.P.
- Metropolitan Archbishop: Martin S. Jumoad
- Vicar General: Msgr. Ramonito Torres

The Territorial Prelature of Marawi (Latin: Praelatura Territorialis Maraviensis), officially the Prelature of Saint Mary in Marawi, is a Catholic territorial prelature under the Archdiocese of Ozamis in the Philippines.

It comprises parishes in the minority Catholic community of Marawi, including at Mindanao State University, and four municipalities in the Lanao Provinces with significant Catholic population: Malabang and Balabagan in Lanao del Sur; and Sultan Naga Dimaporo and Balo-i in Lanao del Norte.

== History ==
The prelature was established on November 20, 1976, carved out of the Territorial Prelature (now Diocese) of Iligan. Fr. Bienvenido S. Tudtud, M.S.P., became the first prelate until his death on June 26, 1987.

It would remain as sede vacante until December 27, 2001, when Fr. Edwin A. de la Peña, M.S.P., was installed as the second and current prelate.

=== Marawi attacks ===
On May 23, 2017, the Daesh-affiliated Maute and Abu Sayyaf groups attacked the city. They also stormed the cathedral, where then-Vicar General Fr. Teresito Soganub and several parishioners were held hostage.

== Ordinaries ==
=== Prelates ===
Prelate		Period in office	Coat of arms
1.	Bienvenido S. Tudtud, M.S.P.† (1931–1987)	25 April 1977 – 26 June 1987 (10 years, 62 days)	
sede vacante (26 June 1987 – 27 December 2001) (14 years, 184 days)
2.	Edwin A. de la Peña, M.S.P. (1954–)	27 December 2001 – present (24 years, 215 days)	

== See also ==
- Marawi
- Catholic Church in the Philippines
  - List of Catholic dioceses in the Philippines
