= Kapatagan =

Kapatagan is the name of two places in the Philippines:

- Kapatagan, Lanao del Norte
- Kapatagan, Lanao del Sur
