= Calanogas =

Municipality in Lanao del Sur, Philippines

Calanogas كالانوجاس
- Municipality
- Municipality of Calanogas
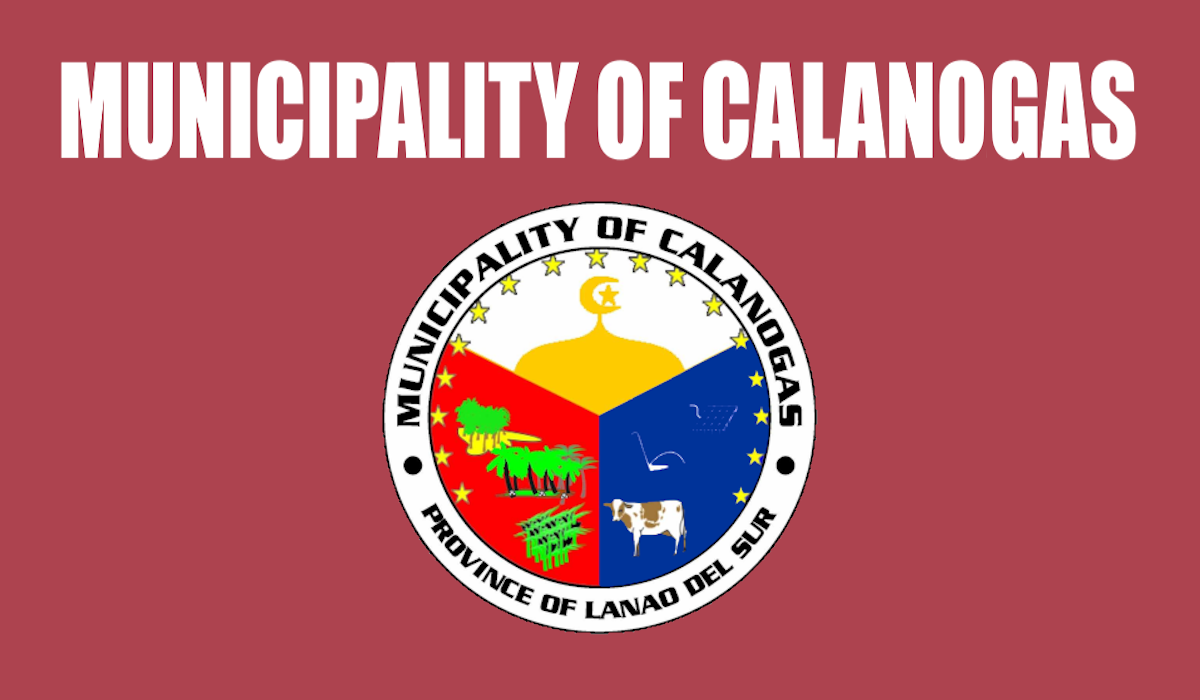
- Flag Seal

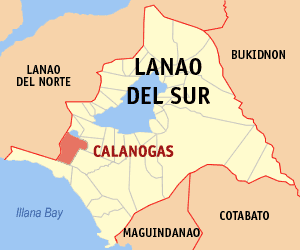
- Map of Lanao del Sur with Calanogas highlighted
- Interactive map of Calanogas
- Location within the Philippines
- Coordinates: 7°44′10″N 124°04′54″E
- Country: Philippines
- Region: Bangsamoro Autonomous Region in Muslim Mindanao
- Province: Lanao del Sur
- House district: 2nd district
- Parliamentary district: 8th district
- Barangays: 17 (see Barangays)

Government
  - Type: Sangguniang Bayan
  - Mayor: Abdul Hakim A. Benito
  - Vice Mayor: Macapado A. Benito Jr.
  - House Representative: Yasser A. Balindong
  - Municipal Council: Members: Mohammad Radja M. Benito; Abdul Ghafur B. Darapa; Yasser B. Benito; Paner M. Dari; Yusop A. Benito; Aloden B. Mitoon; Toma S. Ampuan; Absamin M. Pagayawan
  - Electorate: 7,696 voters (2025)

Area
  - Total: 195.00 km^{2} (75.29 sq mi)
- Elevation: 677 m (2,221 ft)
- Highest elevation: 1,346 m (4,416 ft)
- Lowest elevation: 297 m (974 ft)

Population (2024 census)
  - Total: 17,585
  - Density: 90.179/km^{2} (233.56/sq mi)
  - Households: 2,291

Economy
  - Income class: 4th municipal income class
  - Poverty incidence: 23.07% (2023)
  - Revenue: ₱ 109.7 million (2024)
  - Assets: ₱ 196.7 million (2024)
  - Expenditure: ₱ 126.8 million (2024)
  - Liabilities: ₱ 64.06 million (2024)

Service provider
  - Electricity: Lanao del Sur Electric Cooperative (LASURECO)
- Time zone: UTC+8 (PST)
- ZIP code: 9319
- PSGC: 1903632000
- IDD : area code: +63 (0)63
- Native languages: Maranao; Tagalog
- Major religions: Islam
- Website: www.calanogas-lds.gov.ph

Calanogas, officially the Municipality of Calanogas (Maranao and Iranun: Inged a Calanogas; Tagalog: Bayan ng Calanogas), is a municipality in the province of Lanao del Sur, Philippines. According to the 2024 census, it has a population of 17,585 people.

== Geography ==
=== Barangays ===
Calanogas is politically subdivided into 17 barangays. Each barangay consists of puroks while some have sitios.

- Bubonga Ranao
- Calalaoan (Poblacion)
- Gas
- Inoma
- Inudaran
- Luguna
- Mimbalawag
- Ngingir
- Pagalongan
- Panggawalupa
- Pantaon
- Piksan
- Pindolonan
- Punud
- Tagoranao
- Taliboboka
- Tambac

=== Climate ===
Climate data for Calanogas, Lanao de Sur
Month	Jan	Feb	Mar	Apr	May	Jun	Jul	Aug	Sep	Oct	Nov	Dec	Year
Mean daily maximum °C (°F)	25 (77)	26 (79)	26 (79)	26 (79)	26 (79)	25 (77)	25 (77)	25 (77)	25 (77)	25 (77)	25 (77)	25 (77)	25 (78)
Mean daily minimum °C (°F)	19 (66)	20 (68)	20 (68)	21 (70)	21 (70)	21 (70)	20 (68)	20 (68)	20 (68)	20 (68)	20 (68)	20 (68)	20 (68)
Average precipitation mm (inches)	236 (9.3)	225 (8.9)	244 (9.6)	235 (9.3)	304 (12.0)	287 (11.3)	200 (7.9)	175 (6.9)	158 (6.2)	200 (7.9)	287 (11.3)	243 (9.6)	2,794 (110.2)
Average rainy days	24.3	22.3	26.0	27.2	28.3	27.2	25.8	24.8	22.2	25.4	27.2	25.8	306.5
Source: Meteoblue (modeled/calculated data, not measured locally)

== Demographics ==
Population census of Calanogas
Year	Pop.	±% p.a.
1980	3,834	—
1990	7,559	+7.03%
1995	8,577	+2.40%
2000	9,989	+3.32%
2007	21,847	+11.40%
2010	11,988	−19.62%
2015	13,750	+2.65%
2020	14,985	+1.83%
2024	17,585	+3.92%
Source: Philippine Statistics Authority

== Economy ==
Poverty Incidence of Calanogas

Source: Philippine Statistics Authority

== Government ==
=== List of Mayors ===
- 1986–1988, Moctar M. Pagayawan (Appointed)
- 1988–1992, Moctar M. Pagayawan
- 1992–1995, Moctar M. Pagayawan
- 1995–1998, Moctar M. Pagayawan
- 1998–2001, Ibrahim M. Pagayawan
- 2001–2004, Macapado M. Benito Sr.
- 2004–2007, Macapado M. Benito Sr.
- 2007–2010, Macapado M. Benito Sr.
- 2010–2013, Raquemah A. Benito-Taha
- 2013–2016, Macapado M. Benito Sr.
- 2016–2019, Macapado M. Benito Sr.
- 2019–2022, Macapado M. Benito Sr.
- 2022–2025, Abdul Hakim A. Benito
- 2025–present, Abdul Hakim A. Benito
