= Lanao del Sur's 8th parliamentary district =

Parliamentary district for the Bangsamoro Parliament

- Constituency for the Bangsamoro Parliament
- Boundary of Lanao del Sur's 8th parliamentary district in Lanao del Sur
- Province: Lanao del Sur
- Population: 149,713 (2024)
- Electorate: 83,345 (2026)

Current constituency
- Member of Parliament: Arrie Balindong (elect)
- Political party: UBJP

Lanao del Sur's 8th parliamentary district is the eighth of the nine parliamentary districts of the province of Lanao del Sur for the Bangsamoro Parliament. It is composed of the municipalities of Balabagan, Calanogas, Kapatagan, Malabang, and Picong.

Arrie Balindong of the United Bangsamoro Justice Party is the member of Parliament-elect for the district following the inaugural 2026 Bangsamoro Parliament election. He will assume office on October 30, 2026.

== List of MPs representing the district ==
No.	Portrait	Member (Lifespan)	Term of office	Party	Parliament	Electoral history	Constituencies
1		Arrie Balindong (born 1978)	Assuming office on October 30, 2026	UBJP	1st Parliament	Elected in 2026.	2026–present Balabagan, Calanogas, Kapatagan, Malabang, Picong

== Election results ==
=== 2026 ===
2026 Bangsamoro Parliament election in Lanao del Sur
Party	Candidate	Votes	%
UBJP	Arrie Balindong	74,193	100.00
Total votes		74,193	100.00
UBJP win (new seat)			
