= Lanao del Sur's 9th parliamentary district =

Parliamentary district for the Bangsamoro Parliament

- Constituency for the Bangsamoro Parliament
- Boundary of Lanao del Sur's 9th parliamentary district in Lanao del Sur
- Province: Lanao del Sur
- Population: 116,877 (2024)
- Electorate: 62,840 (2026)

Current constituency
- Member of Parliament: Rashdi Adiong (elect)
- Political party: SIAP

Lanao del Sur's 9th parliamentary district is the ninth of the nine parliamentary districts of the province of Lanao del Sur for the Bangsamoro Parliament. It is composed of the municipalities of Amai Manabilang, Lumba-Bayabao, and Wao.

Rashdi Adiong of the SIAP Party is the member of Parliament-elect for the district following the inaugural 2026 Bangsamoro Parliament election. He will assume office on October 30, 2026.

== List of MPs representing the district ==
No.	Portrait	Member (Lifespan)	Term of office	Party	Parliament	Electoral history	Constituencies
1		Rashdi Adiong (born 1958)	Assuming office on October 30, 2026	SIAP	1st Parliament	Elected in 2026.	2026–present Amai Manabilang, Lumba-Bayabao, Wao

== Election results ==
=== 2026 ===
2026 Bangsamoro Parliament election in Lanao del Sur
Party	Candidate	Votes	%
SIAP	Rashdi Adiong	35,362	76.88
UBJP	Anwar Galo-Lamping	6,432	13.98
BaPa	Jalal Bayabao	4,200	9.13
Total votes		45,994	100.00
SIAP win (new seat)			
