= St. Mary's Cathedral (Marawi) =

Roman Catholic church in Lanao del Sur, Philippines

Marawi Cathedral
- Cathedral of María Auxiliadora
- Saint Mary's Cathedral
- Catedral de María Auxiliadora (Spanish); Catedral de Santa María (Spanish)
- Location in Mindanao Location in the Philippines
- 7°59′49″N 124°17′40″E
- Location: Marawi, Lanao del Sur
- Country: Philippines
- Denomination: Roman Catholic

History
- Status: Cathedral
- Dedication: Mary Help of Christians

Architecture
- Functional status: Inactive, heavily damaged
- Architectural type: Church building
- Completed: 1934

Administration
- Archdiocese: Ozamis
- Diocese: Marawi

Clergy
- Bishop: Edwin de la Peña

The Cathedral of María Auxiliadora, also known as Saint Mary's Cathedral, is a Roman Catholic church in the predominantly Muslim city of Marawi on the southern island of Mindanao, Philippines. The church is the seat of the Territorial Prelature of Marawi.

== Background ==
Belonging to the Territorial Prelature of Marawi, the church was built in 1934 and dedicated to Mary Help of Christians. In March 2008, the church reportedly had a corrugated iron roof. Being in a majority Muslim city, the church's façade did not display a cross.

== Battle of Marawi ==
During the 2017 Battle of Marawi, the extremist Maute Group seized the cathedral as part of their takeover of the city. Online videos posted by the militants showed them toppling and smashing religious icons, tearing photographs of Pope Francis, and desecrating the chancel. They later set pews and the whole structure alight. The church was heavily damaged with bullet holes on the structure's wall and tin roof.

The military recaptured the cathedral from the Maute Group on August 25, 2017. The first Sunday Mass was held in the cathedral on October 1, 2017, coinciding with the feast of Saint Thérèse of Lisieux, patroness of the Philippine Army. The service was attended by at least 300 uniformed soldiers. With Bishop Edwin de la Peña y Angot's consent, Saint Mary’s Cathedral, along with his residence, will be among the many buildings to be demolished by the government as it is no longer structurally sound.
