= Edwin de la Peña =

Filipino Roman Catholic bishop

The Most Reverend Edwin A. de la Peña M.S.P., D.D.
- Bishop-Prelate of Marawi
- Province: Ozamis
- See: Marawi
- Appointed: June 23, 2000
- Installed: December 27, 2001
- Predecessor: Bienvenido Tudtud

Orders
- Ordination: April 22, 1981 by Gaudencio Rosales
- Consecration: December 27, 2001 by Antonio Franco

Personal details
- Born: April 5, 1954 (age 72) Tambisan, San Juan, Siquijor, Philippines
- Denomination: Roman Catholic
- Residence: Marawi, Lanao del Sur, Philippines
- Motto: "Pax Et Fraternitas"
- Coat of arms

Styles of Edwin A. de la Peña
- Reference style: His Excellency; The Most Reverend
- Spoken style: Your Excellency
- Religious style: Bishop

Edwin Angot de la Peña, M.S.P. (born April 5, 1954) is a Filipino bishop of the Catholic Church, currently serving as the Bishop-Prelate of Marawi since 2000.

== Early life and education ==
Edwin de la Peña was born on April 5, 1954, in Tambisan, San Juan, Siquijor, Philippines. He complete elementary education at Siquijor Central Elementary School. He began his seminary formation in 1968 at the Mission Society of the Philippines's minor seminary in Tayud, Consolacion, Cebu until its closure in 1971 and finished it in St. Joseph Seminary in Dumaguete from 1971 to 1972. He pursued his philosophical studies at the San Carlos Seminary in Cebu from 1972 to 1976 and theological studies at the Divine Word Seminary in Tagaytay City from 1976 to 1981. He later obtained a licentiate in spiritual theology from the Pontifical Gregorian University in Rome from 1996 to 1998.

== Priesthood ==
De la Peña was ordained a priest on April 22, 1981. Following his ordination, he served in various capacities within the MSP and in different mission areas. Initially assigned to Marawi to immerse himself in Muslim culture, he later became the acting rector of the Fil-Mission Seminary in Tagaytay City. In 1983, he was elected as the first Supreme Moderator of the MSP, a position he held until 1988. His long-held aspiration for cross-cultural mission work was realized when he was assigned to the Archdiocese of Port Moresby in Papua New Guinea, where he served from 1989 to 1995.

== Episcopal ministry ==
On June 23, 2000, Pope John Paul II appointed de la Peña as the Prelate of Marawi. He was installed on August 12, 2001. On October 22, 2001, he was elevated bishop by Pope John Paul II, and his episcopal ordination took place on December 27, 2001, at the Metropolitan Cathedral of the Immaculate Conception of Ozamiz with Archbishop Antonio Franco serving as the principal consecrator.

During the Marawi siege in 2017, he played a significant role in calling for peace and in the relief efforts for both Christian and Muslim residents displaced by the conflict. The siege led to the destruction of key church infrastructures, including the St. Mary's Cathedral in Marawi. De la Peña has been at the forefront of efforts to rebuild the Christian presence in the city.

Within Catholic Bishops' Conference of the Philippines (CBCP), he has been the chairman of the Commission on Mission from 2003 to 2013 and the Commission on Interreligious Dialogue since 2019.

Catholic Church titles
Preceded by Bienvenido S. Tudtud	Prelate of Marawi; 2000–present	Incumbent
