= Amai Manabilang =

Municipality in Lanao del Sur, Philippines

Amai Manabilang أماي مانابيلانج Bumbaran
- Municipality
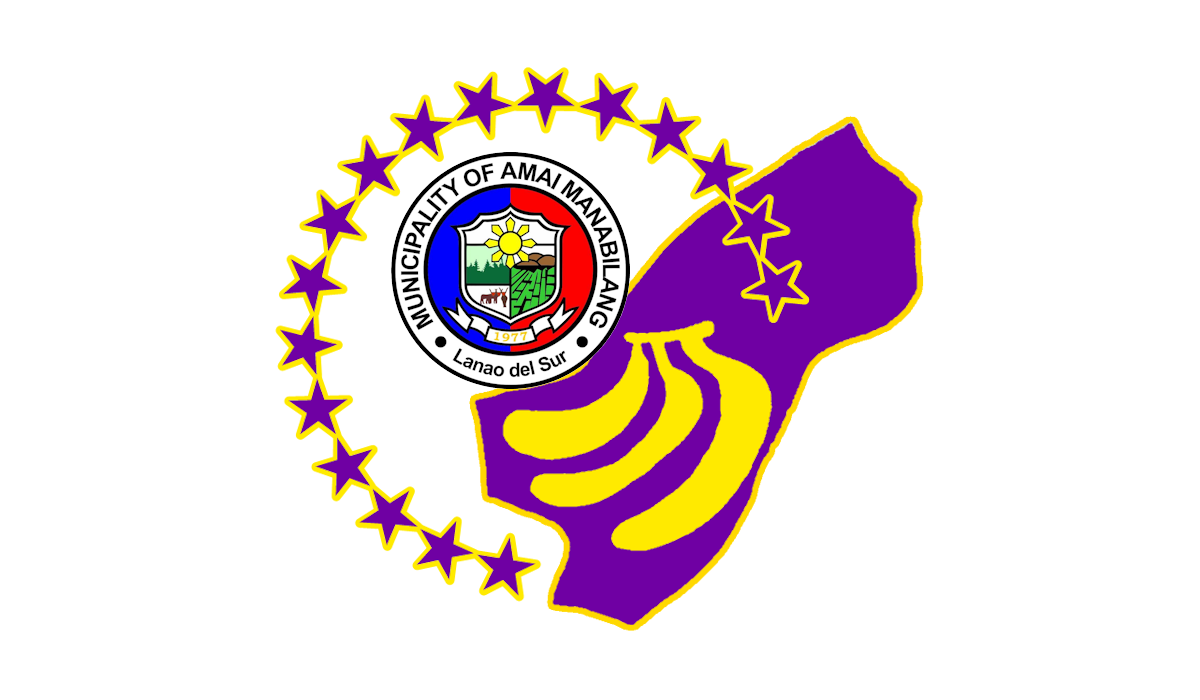
- Flag Seal

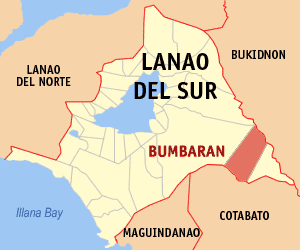
- Map of Lanao del Sur with Amai Manabilang highlighted
- Interactive map of Amai Manabilang
- Location within the Philippines
- Coordinates: 7°47′07″N 124°40′56″E
- Country: Philippines
- Region: Bangsamoro Autonomous Region in Muslim Mindanao
- Province: Lanao del Sur
- House district: 1st district
- Parliamentary district: 9th district
- Founded: November 17, 1977
- Renamed: January 22, 2015; April 7, 2018
- Named for: Amai Manabilang
- Barangays: 17 (see Barangays)

Government
  - Type: Sangguniang Bayan
  - Mayor: Saidamen Leo E. Manabilang
  - Vice Mayor: Jamal E. Manabilang
  - House Representative: Ziaur-Rahman A. Adiong
  - Municipal Council: Members: Hedjarah Lydia E. Manabilang; Noel C. Baldonasa; Jaime S. Mabitazan; Nabilah T. Dimaocor; Sowaib P. Pado; Maimay P. Amino; Jasmine S. Macabantog; Abel B. Pacasum
  - Electorate: 5,825 voters (2025)

Area
  - Total: 544.10 km^{2} (210.08 sq mi)
- Elevation: 988 m (3,241 ft)
- Highest elevation: 1,711 m (5,614 ft)
- Lowest elevation: 523 m (1,716 ft)

Population (2024 census)
  - Total: 14,837
  - Density: 27.269/km^{2} (70.626/sq mi)
  - Households: 2,118

Economy
  - Income class: 1st municipal income class
  - Poverty incidence: 21.1% (2023)
  - Revenue: ₱ 204.6 million (2023), 215.6 million (2024)
  - Assets: ₱ 192.8 million (2023), 201.4 million (2024)
  - Expenditure: ₱ 208.7 million (2023), 215 million (2024)
  - Liabilities: ₱ 62.98 million (2023), 73.96 million (2024)

Service provider
  - Electricity: First Bukidnon Electric Cooperative (FIBECO)
- Time zone: UTC+8 (PST)
- ZIP code: 9320
- PSGC: 1903637000
- IDD : area code: +63 (0)63
- Native languages: Maranao; Tagalog
- Major religions: Islam, Roman Catholicism
- Website: www.bumbaran-lds.gov.ph

Amai Manabilang, officially the Municipality of Amai Manabilang (Maranao: Inged a Amai Manabilang; Tagalog: Bayan ng Amai Manabilang), is a municipality in the province of Lanao del Sur, Philippines. According to the 2024 census, it has a population of 14,837 people.

The municipality, formerly Bumbaran, was changed to Amai Manabilang under Muslim Mindanao Act No. 316 on January 22, 2015.

== Etymology ==
Bumbaran is named after the legendary city of Magalinday Bembaran in the Darangen, a Meranau (Maranao) epic.

After the political efforts of Mayor James Manabilang, Bumbaran was renamed into Amai Manabilang, in honor of his own personal ancestor.

== History ==
Bumbaran was commonly known before as “Aparport” its seat of government. Its existence came into being when President Ferdinand Marcos signed into law on November 17, 1977, Presidential Decree No. 1243 creating Aparport a separate and independent municipality and naming it the Municipality of Bumbaran, separate from the Municipality of Wao, its mother municipality. This was necessary in order to maximize the enforcement of law and order and expedite optimum and sustainable development.

At that time, the municipality consisted of 21 barangays namely: Sumogot, Francfort, Lambanogan, Punud, Comara, Aparport, Paglamatan, Natangcopan, Mansilano, Salam, Bandara-Ingud, Ranao-Ibaning, Bagumbayan, Pagonayan, Piagma, Lico, Siuan, Lama, Borntacan, Miorod, and Someorang. It was reduced to seventeen barangays when President Corazon Aquino signed an Executive Order in December 1986 abolishing thousands of barangays in the country which affected barangays Lama, Miorod, Borontacan, and Someorang.

On January 22, 2015, Bumbaran was renamed to Amai Manabilang by virtue of Muslim Mindanao Act No. 316. It was later confirmed through a plebiscite held on April 7, 2018.

== Geography ==
The municipal boundaries are defined as follows: on the east by the municipality of Wao, separated by a straight line 13.65 kilometers (8.48 mi) long, drawn northward from Point 1 to Point 2 on the bank of the Maladugao river 1.5 kilometers (0.93 mi). East Sumogot on the Lanao–Bukidnon boundary as point 3; then by straight line following the Lumba-Bayabao–Wao boundary line. Southward of the intersection of the Lanao–Cotabato boundary as point 4; then finally 1.72 kilometers (1.07 mi). Eastward following the Lanao–Cotabato boundary to the starting point.

=== Barangays ===
Amai Manabilang is politically subdivided into 17 barangays. Each barangay consists of puroks while some have sitios.

- Bagumbayan
- Bandara-Ingud
- Comara (Potre Maamor)
- Francfort
- Lambanogan
- Lico
- Mansilano
- Natangcopan
- Pagalamatan
- Pagonayan
- Penud
- Piagma
- Poblacion (Apartfort)
- Ranao-Baning
- Salam
- Sigu-an
- Sumogot

=== Climate ===
Climate data for Amai Manabilang, Lanao de Sur
Month	Jan	Feb	Mar	Apr	May	Jun	Jul	Aug	Sep	Oct	Nov	Dec	Year
Mean daily maximum °C (°F)	24 (75)	24 (75)	25 (77)	25 (77)	24 (75)	23 (73)	23 (73)	23 (73)	23 (73)	23 (73)	23 (73)	24 (75)	24 (74)
Mean daily minimum °C (°F)	16 (61)	16 (61)	17 (63)	18 (64)	18 (64)	18 (64)	18 (64)	17 (63)	18 (64)	18 (64)	18 (64)	17 (63)	17 (63)
Average precipitation mm (inches)	174 (6.9)	145 (5.7)	159 (6.3)	192 (7.6)	302 (11.9)	343 (13.5)	297 (11.7)	265 (10.4)	244 (9.6)	293 (11.5)	306 (12.0)	188 (7.4)	2,908 (114.5)
Average rainy days	17.4	14.4	17.4	21.3	27.6	28.0	27.9	26.9	25.0	26.9	26.0	21.1	279.9
Source: Meteoblue (modeled/calculated data, not measured locally)

The town's climate is similar to that of Baguio.

== Demographics ==
Population census of Amai Manabilang
Year	Pop.	±% p.a.
1980	3,401	—
1990	4,341	+2.47%
1995	6,001	+6.26%
2000	6,589	+2.02%
2007	13,297	+10.17%
2010	8,734	−14.18%
2015	10,401	+3.38%
2020	12,124	+3.28%
2024	14,837	+4.97%
Source: Philippine Statistics Authority

=== Religion ===
Religion in Amai Manabilang, Lanao del Sur
Religion	Percent
Islam	99%
Christianity	1%

Amai Manabilang is composed of two major groups – 99% Muslim Bangsamoro and 1% Catholic. Catholics inhabited barangays Sumogot and Francfort. The Muslim Bangsamoros occupied the rest of the 17 barangays.

=== Ethnic groups ===
Amai Manabilang is inhabited by settlers of different origins, like Ilonggos, Ivatans, Ilocano, Bisaya and other smaller ethnic groups that dominated barangays Francfort and Sumugot. This is due to the Settlement Program and Land Tenure Laws of the Republic of the Philippines. The Moro Maranaws who came from the different municipalities of Lanao del Sur and Lanao del Norte inhabited the rest of the seventeen barangays of this municipality. Their source of livelihood is farming, mainly crop production. Having rich soil, the municipality is one of the largest corn producers in the province, only second to its mother municipality of Wao for having vast agricultural land capable of producing variable crops which could give sufficient food and income to the population.

== Economy ==
Poverty Incidence of Amai Manabilang

Source: Philippine Statistics Authority
