= Picong, Lanao del Sur =

Municipality in Lanao del Sur, Philippines

Picong Sultan Gumander بيكونج
- Municipality
- Municipality of Picong
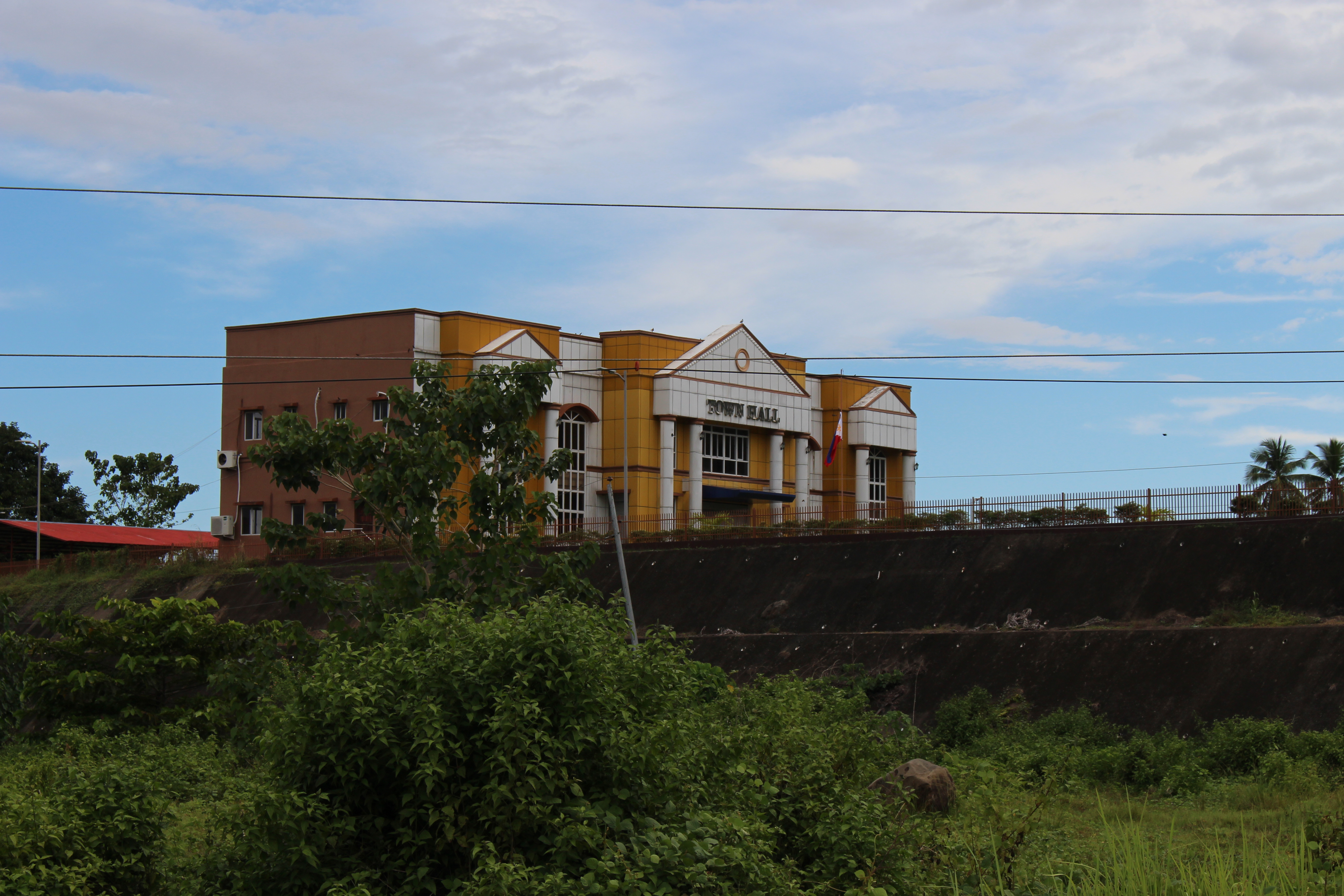
- Municipal Hall of Picong

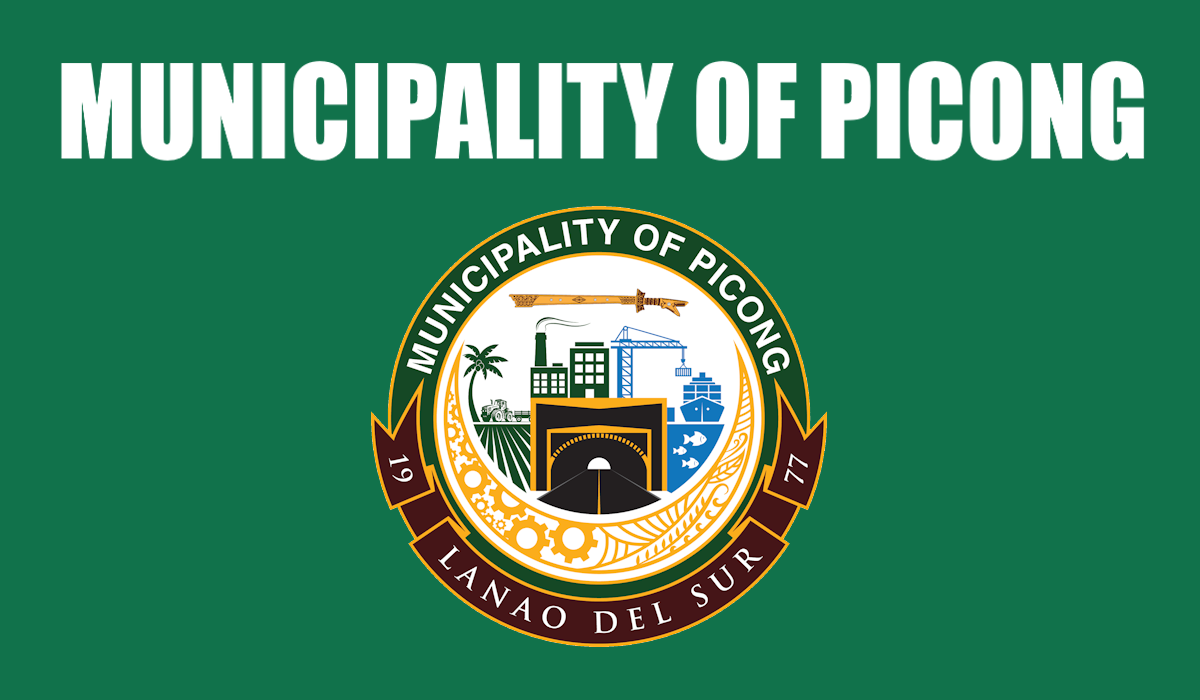
- Flag Seal

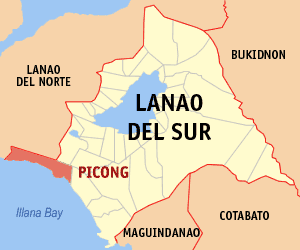
- Map of Lanao del Sur with Picong highlighted
- Interactive map of Picong
- Location within the Philippines
- Coordinates: 7°40′08″N 123°58′01″E
- Country: Philippines
- Region: Bangsamoro Autonomous Region in Muslim Mindanao
- Province: Lanao del Sur
- House district: 2nd district
- Parliamentary district: 8th district
- Barangays: 19 (see Barangays)

Government
  - Type: Sangguniang Bayan
  - Mayor: Mesron D. Balindong
  - Vice Mayor: Yacob D. Balindong
  - House Representative: Yasser A. Balindong
  - Municipal Council: Members: Omar A. Balindong; Aiman G. Balindong; Hamdani B. Macadato; Aripoden M. Ali; Abdulmoiz D. Balindong; Waylie B. Macadato; Michael M. Mangbisa; Lindi S. Mambatao
  - Electorate: 11,828 voters (2025)

Area
  - Total: 280.00 km^{2} (108.11 sq mi)
- Elevation: 75 m (246 ft)
- Highest elevation: 532 m (1,745 ft)
- Lowest elevation: 0 m (0 ft)

Population (2024 census)
  - Total: 19,296
  - Density: 68.914/km^{2} (178.49/sq mi)
  - Households: 2,872

Economy
  - Income class: 3rd municipal income class
  - Poverty incidence: 16.62% (2023)
  - Revenue: ₱ 162.1 million (2024)
  - Assets: ₱ 160.4 million (2024)
  - Expenditure: ₱ 158.6 million (2024)
  - Liabilities: ₱ 72.22 million (2024)

Service provider
  - Electricity: Lanao del Sur Electric Cooperative (LASURECO)
- Time zone: UTC+8 (PST)
- ZIP code: 9303
- PSGC: 1903635000
- IDD : area code: +63 (0)63
- Native languages: Maranao; Tagalog
- Major religions: Islam
- Website: www.sultangumander-lds.gov.ph

Picong, officially the Municipality of Picong (Maranao: Inged a Picong; Filipino: Bayan ng Picong), is a municipality in the province of Lanao del Sur, Philippines. According to the 2024 census, it has a population of 19,296 people.

== History ==
The municipality was formerly known as Sultan Gumander, named in honor of Datukali Gumander (1880–1973), an Iranun tribal leader and traditional judge, who served as a mediator and peacemaker among the local Moro communities during the late 19th and early 20th centuries.

The municipality was renamed to Picong in 2006 pursuant to Muslim Mindanao Autonomy Act No. 175 dated December 16, 2004, which was ratified through a plebiscite conducted by the Commission of Elections on March 25, 2006.

== Geography ==
=== Barangays ===
Picong is politically subdivided into 19 barangays. Each barangay consists of puroks while some have sitios.

- Anas
- Bara-as
- Biasong (Badak)
- Bulangos
- Durian
- Ilian
- Liangan (Poblacion)
- Maganding
- Maladi
- Mapantao
- Micalubo
- Mimbalawag
- Pindolonan
- Punong
- Ramitan
- Torogan
- Tual
- Tuca
- Ubanoban (Maladig)

=== Climate ===
Climate data for Picong, Lanao del Sur
Month	Jan	Feb	Mar	Apr	May	Jun	Jul	Aug	Sep	Oct	Nov	Dec	Year
Mean daily maximum °C (°F)	29 (84)	30 (86)	30 (86)	30 (86)	30 (86)	29 (84)	29 (84)	29 (84)	29 (84)	29 (84)	29 (84)	30 (86)	29 (85)
Mean daily minimum °C (°F)	23 (73)	24 (75)	24 (75)	25 (77)	25 (77)	25 (77)	24 (75)	24 (75)	24 (75)	24 (75)	24 (75)	24 (75)	24 (75)
Average precipitation mm (inches)	236 (9.3)	225 (8.9)	244 (9.6)	235 (9.3)	304 (12.0)	287 (11.3)	200 (7.9)	175 (6.9)	158 (6.2)	200 (7.9)	287 (11.3)	243 (9.6)	2,794 (110.2)
Average rainy days	24.3	22.3	26.0	27.2	28.3	27.2	25.8	24.8	22.2	25.4	27.2	25.8	306.5
Source: Meteoblue (modeled/calculated data, not measured locally)

== Demographics ==
Population census of Picong
Year	Pop.	±% p.a.
1970	7,901	—
1975	9,016	+2.68%
1980	6,765	−5.58%
1990	9,402	+3.35%
1995	10,503	+2.10%
2000	12,230	+3.32%
2007	23,487	+9.42%
2010	14,136	−16.87%
2015	16,615	+3.13%
2020	18,907	+2.76%
2024	19,296	+0.49%
Source: Philippine Statistics Authority

== Economy ==
Poverty Incidence of Picong

Source: Philippine Statistics Authority

== See also ==
- List of renamed cities and municipalities in the Philippines
