= Balabagan =

Municipality in Lanao del Sur, Philippines

Balabagan بلاباغان
- Municipality
- Municipality of Balabagan
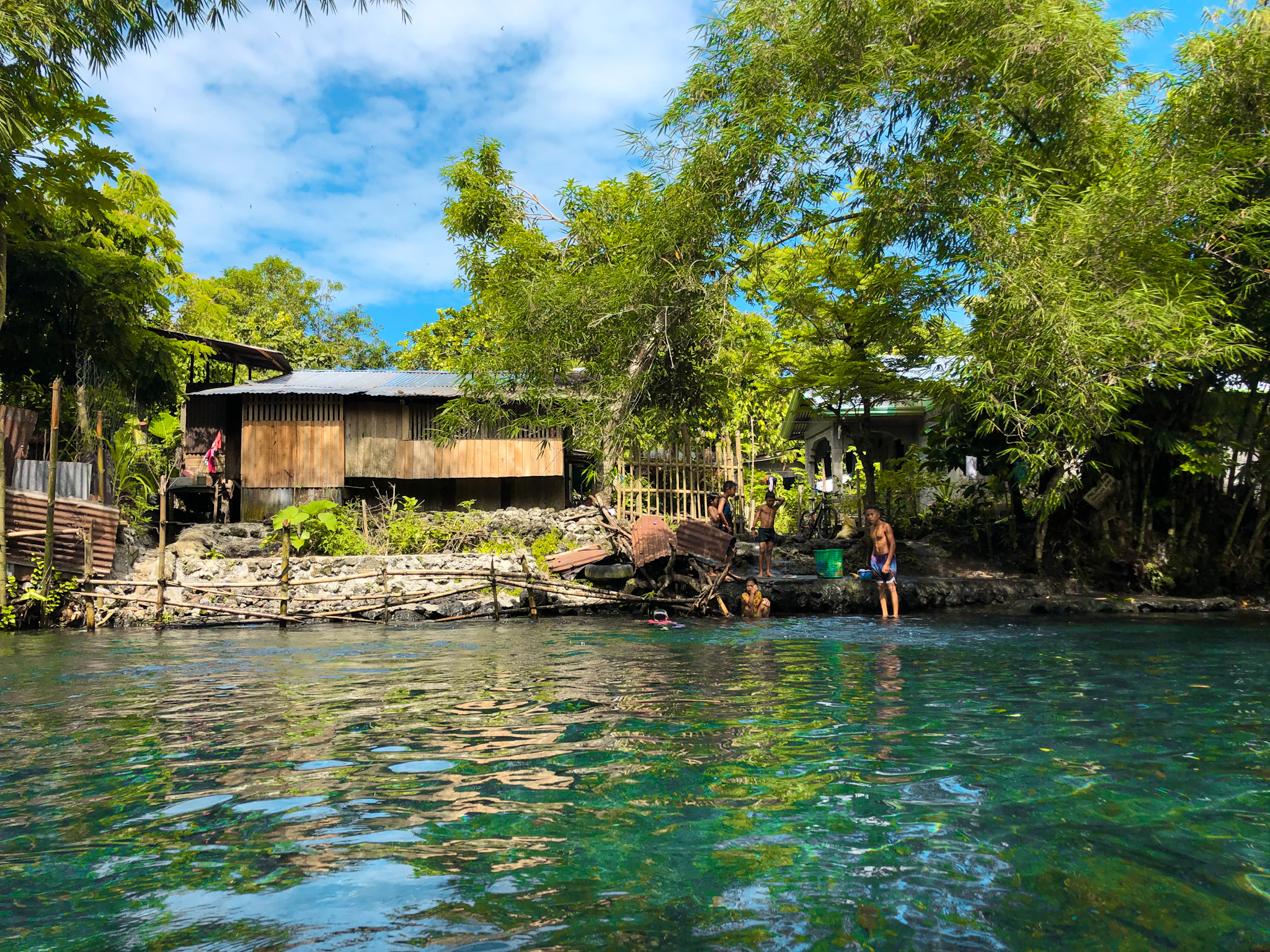
- Spring in Balabagan

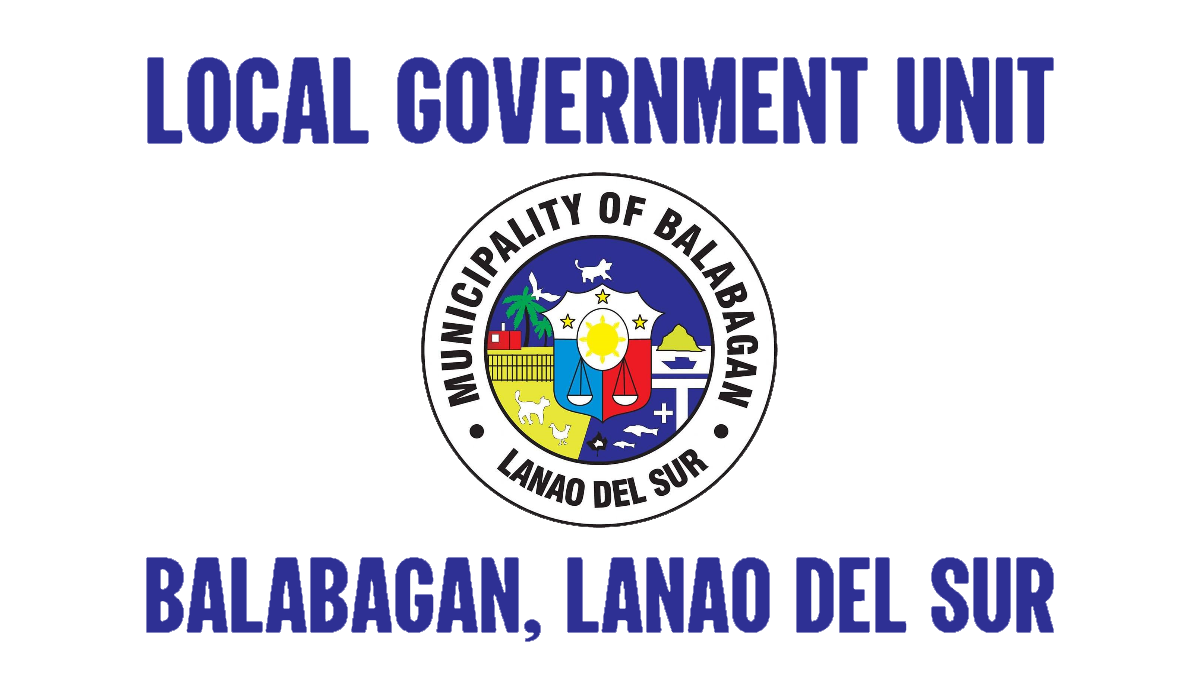
- Flag Seal

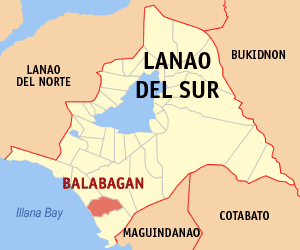
- Map of Lanao del Sur with Balabagan highlighted
- Interactive map of Balabagan
- Location within the Philippines
- Coordinates: 7°30′31″N 124°07′42″E
- Country: Philippines
- Region: Bangsamoro Autonomous Region in Muslim Mindanao
- Province: Lanao del Sur
- House district: 2nd district
- Parliamentary district: 8th district
- Barangays: 27 (see Barangays)

Government
  - Type: Sangguniang Bayan
  - Mayor: Jover O. Benito
  - Vice Mayor: Edna O. Benito
  - House Representative: Yasser A. Balindong
  - Municipal Council: Members: Shahir O. Benito; Romaizan O. Abi; Mervin S. Mamenting; Billie Jean O. Abdullah; Esmael P. Sampiano; Saguira D. Inog; Nonilon P. Norodin; Macalimbon C. Atandor
  - Electorate: 18,459 voters (2025)

Area
  - Total: 230.00 km^{2} (88.80 sq mi)
- Elevation: 61 m (200 ft)
- Highest elevation: 537 m (1,762 ft)
- Lowest elevation: 0 m (0 ft)

Population (2024 census)
  - Total: 31,227
  - Density: 135.77/km^{2} (351.64/sq mi)
  - Households: 5,170

Economy
  - Income class: 2nd municipal income class
  - Poverty incidence: 22.92% (2023)
  - Revenue: ₱ 177.8 million (2024)
  - Assets: ₱ 316.6 million (2024)
  - Expenditure: ₱ 156.8 million (2024)
  - Liabilities: ₱ 171.6 million (2024)

Service provider
  - Electricity: Lanao del Sur Electric Cooperative (LASURECO)
- Time zone: UTC+8 (PST)
- ZIP code: 9302
- PSGC: 1903602000
- IDD : area code: +63 (0)63
- Native languages: Maranao; Tagalog; Iranun
- Major religions: Islam, Roman Catholicism
- Website: www.balabagan-lds.gov.ph

Balabagan, officially the Municipality of Balabagan (Maranao and Iranun: Inged a Balabagan; Filipino: Bayan ng Balabagan), is a municipality in the province of Lanao del Sur, Philippines. According to the 2024 census, it has a population of 31,227 people.

== History ==
Balabagan became a municipality during the presidency of Ferdinand Marcos.

The territory was reduced when, through Batas Pambansa Blg. 168 of 1982, 36 barangays were separated to create the municipality of Kapatagan.

== Geography ==
=== Barangays ===
Balabagan is politically subdivided into 27 barangays. Each barangay consists of puroks while some have sitios.

- Banago
- Barorao
- Batuan
- Budas
- Calilangan
- Igabay
- Magulaleng Occidental
- Magulaleng Oriental
- Molimoc
- Narra
- Plasan
- Purakan
- Buisan (Bengabeng)
- Buenavista
- Lorenzo
- Lower Itil
- Macao
- Poblacion
- Upper Itil
- Bagoaingud
- Ilian
- Lumbac
- Matampay
- Matanog
- Pindolonan
- Tataya

=== Climate ===
Climate data for Balabagan, Lanao de Sur
Month	Jan	Feb	Mar	Apr	May	Jun	Jul	Aug	Sep	Oct	Nov	Dec	Year
Mean daily maximum °C (°F)	30 (86)	30 (86)	31 (88)	31 (88)	30 (86)	30 (86)	29 (84)	29 (84)	30 (86)	30 (86)	30 (86)	30 (86)	30 (86)
Mean daily minimum °C (°F)	24 (75)	24 (75)	25 (77)	25 (77)	26 (79)	25 (77)	25 (77)	25 (77)	25 (77)	25 (77)	25 (77)	25 (77)	25 (77)
Average precipitation mm (inches)	236 (9.3)	225 (8.9)	244 (9.6)	235 (9.3)	304 (12.0)	287 (11.3)	200 (7.9)	175 (6.9)	158 (6.2)	200 (7.9)	287 (11.3)	243 (9.6)	2,794 (110.2)
Average rainy days	24.3	22.3	26.0	27.2	28.3	27.2	25.8	24.8	22.2	25.4	27.2	25.8	306.5
Source: Meteoblue (modeled/calculated data, not measured locally)

== Demographics ==
Population census of Balabagan
Year	Pop.	±% p.a.
1970	24,494	—
1975	22,633	−1.57%
1980	12,979	−10.52%
1990	18,146	+3.41%
1995	21,557	+3.28%
2000	24,558	+2.83%
2007	33,421	+4.34%
2010	25,139	−9.84%
2015	26,819	+1.24%
2020	29,863	+2.29%
2024	31,227	+1.08%
Source: Philippine Statistics Authority

=== Religion ===
Religion in Balabagan
Religion	Percent
Islam	80%
Christianity	20%

== Economy ==
Poverty Incidence of Balabagan

Source: Philippine Statistics Authority
