= Kapatagan, Lanao del Sur =

Municipality in Lanao del Sur, Philippines

Kapatagan كفتاغان
- Municipality
- Municipality of Kapatagan
- Municipal Hall

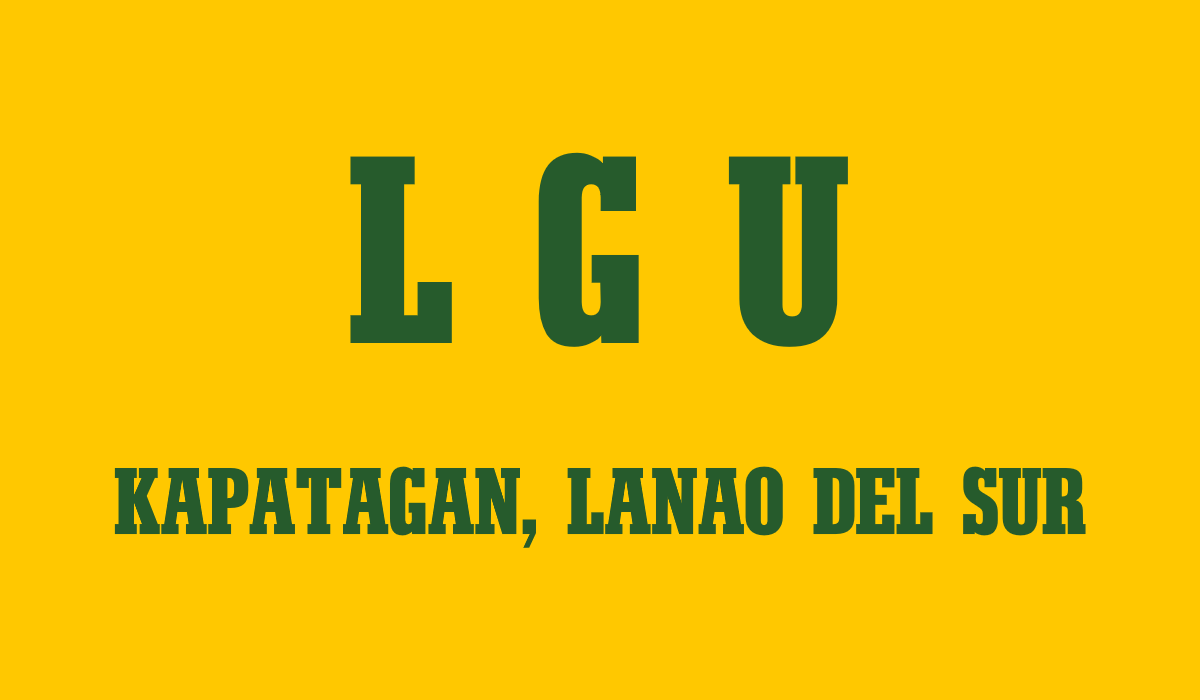
- Flag Seal

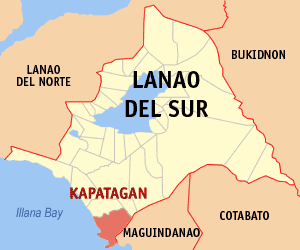
- Map of Lanao del Sur with Kapatagan highlighted
- Interactive map of Kapatagan
- Location within the Philippines
- Coordinates: 7°32′30″N 124°12′50″E
- Country: Philippines
- Region: Bangsamoro Autonomous Region in Muslim Mindanao
- Province: Lanao del Sur
- House district: 2nd district
- Parliamentary district: 8th district
- Barangays: 15 (see Barangays)

Government
  - Type: Sangguniang Bayan
  - Mayor: Raida B. Maglangit
  - Vice Mayor: Nhazruddin B. Maglangit
  - House Representative: Yasser A. Balindong
  - Municipal Council: Members: <div style="border-style:solid o; Medalia T. Bansil; Subaira B. Lacoto; Samir M. Macabalang; Johany B. Benito; Saidon G. Beda; Ali L. Bansil; Amer D. Bansil; Johaiber Y. Dipatuan
  - Electorate: 12,226 voters (2025)

Area
  - Total: 288.13 km^{2} (111.25 sq mi)
- Elevation: 296 m (971 ft)
- Highest elevation: 824 m (2,703 ft)
- Lowest elevation: 9 m (30 ft)

Population (2024 census)
  - Total: 23,228
  - Density: 80.616/km^{2} (208.80/sq mi)
  - Households: 3,466

Economy
  - Income class: 2nd municipal income class
  - Poverty incidence: 28.42% (2023)
  - Revenue: ₱ 174.4 million (2024)
  - Assets: ₱ 468.2 million (2024)
  - Expenditure: ₱ 166.3 million (2024)
  - Liabilities: ₱ 166.7 million (2024)

Service provider
  - Electricity: Lanao del Sur Electric Cooperative (LASURECO)
- Time zone: UTC+8 (PST)
- ZIP code: 9700
- PSGC: 1903639000
- IDD : area code: +63 (0)63
- Native languages: Maranao; Tagalog
- Major religions: Islam, Roman Catholicism
- Website: www.kapatagan-lds.gov.ph

Kapatagan, officially the Municipality of Kapatagan (Maranao: Inged a Kapatagan; Tagalog: Bayan ng Kapatagan), is a municipality in the province of Lanao del Sur, Philippines. According to the 2024 census, it has a population of 23,228 people.

== History ==
On February 8, 1982, Batas Pambansa Blg. 168 was approved; 36 barangays in Balabagan were separated to create Kapatagan, with one with the same name designated the seat of government. A plebiscite for ratification, along with ten more newly-created local entities, was held on May 17, coinciding with the barangay elections.

== Geography ==
=== Barangays ===
Kapatagan is politically subdivided into 15 barangays. Each barangay consists of puroks while some have sitios.

- Bakikis
- Barao
- Bongabong
- Daguan
- Inudaran
- Kabaniakawan
- Kapatagan
- Lusain
- Matimos
- Minimao
- Pinantao
- Salaman
- Sigayan
- Tabuan
- Upper Igabay

=== Climate ===
Climate data for Kapatagan, Lanao del Sur
Month	Jan	Feb	Mar	Apr	May	Jun	Jul	Aug	Sep	Oct	Nov	Dec	Year
Mean daily maximum °C (°F)	28 (82)	28 (82)	29 (84)	29 (84)	28 (82)	28 (82)	27 (81)	27 (81)	28 (82)	28 (82)	28 (82)	28 (82)	28 (82)
Mean daily minimum °C (°F)	22 (72)	22 (72)	23 (73)	23 (73)	24 (75)	23 (73)	23 (73)	23 (73)	23 (73)	23 (73)	23 (73)	23 (73)	23 (73)
Average precipitation mm (inches)	236 (9.3)	225 (8.9)	244 (9.6)	235 (9.3)	304 (12.0)	287 (11.3)	200 (7.9)	175 (6.9)	158 (6.2)	200 (7.9)	287 (11.3)	243 (9.6)	2,794 (110.2)
Average rainy days	24.3	22.3	26.0	27.2	28.3	27.2	25.8	24.8	22.2	25.4	27.2	25.8	306.5
Source: Meteoblue (modeled/calculated data, not measured locally)

== Demographics ==
Population census of Kapatagan
Year	Pop.	±% p.a.
1990	5,784	—
1995	6,702	+2.80%
2000	7,804	+3.32%
2007	19,598	+13.54%
2010	13,432	−12.85%
2015	15,521	+2.79%
2020	20,498	+6.03%
2024	23,228	+3.05%
Source: Philippine Statistics Authority

== Economy ==
Poverty Incidence of Kapatagan

Source: Philippine Statistics Authority
