= Maranao language =

Austronesian language spoken in the Philippines

Maranao
- Basa a Mëranaw باسا أ مراناو
- Pronunciation: [ˈməranaw]
- Native to: Philippines
- Region: Lanao del Sur, Lanao del Norte, northwest Bukidnon, northwest Maguindanao del Norte, northwest Cotabato, Misamis Occidental, Misamis Oriental, Zamboanga, Davao, Cebu, Ilocos, Quiapo, Manila, and Sabah, Malaysia
- Ethnicity: Maranao
- Native speakers: c. 2.5 million
- Language family: Austronesian: Malayo-Polynesian; Philippine; Greater Central Philippine; Danao; Maranao
- Dialects: Iranaon (People of the Lake); Iranun (Southern Lanao, Maguindanao del Norte, and Sabah); Mëragatën (Illana Bay); Bolokaon (Sultan Gumander)
- Writing system: Latin; Historically written in Jawi (Batang Arab)

Official status
- Official language in: Regional language in the Philippines
- Regulated by: Komisyon sa Wikang Filipino

Language codes
- ISO 639-3: mrw
- Glottolog: mara1404
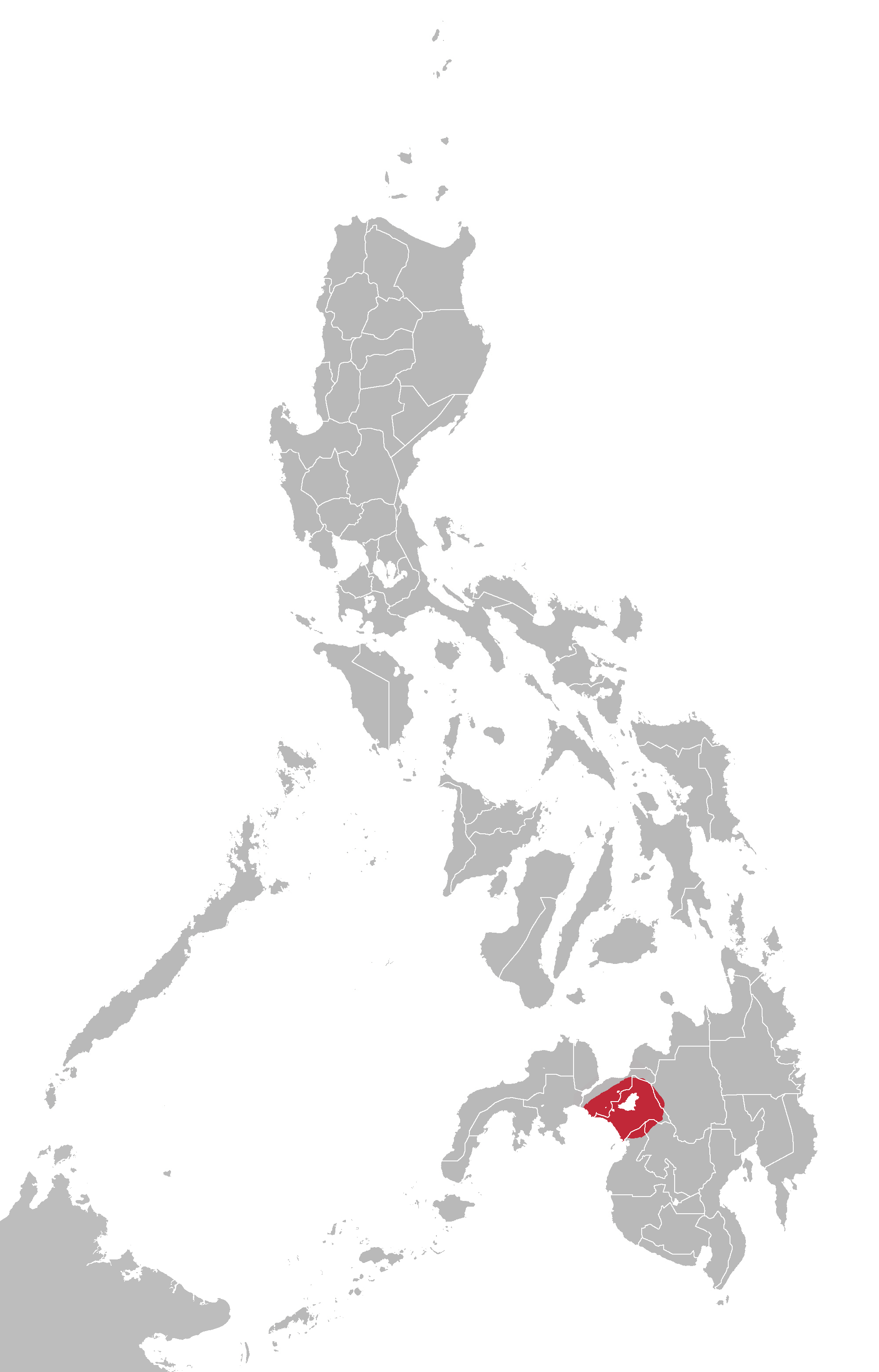
- Area where Maranao is spoken

Maranao (Filipino: Wikang Mëranaw; (Note: Mëranaw is the spelling recommended by the Commission on the Filipino Language) Jawi: باسا أ مراناو), sometimes spelled as Maranaw, Meranaw, or Mëranaw, is an Austronesian language spoken by the Maranao people in the provinces of Lanao del Sur and Lanao del Norte and their respective cities of Marawi and Iligan located in the Philippines, as well found also in Sabah, Malaysia. It is spoken among the Moros within the Bangsamoro Autonomous Region in Muslim Mindanao.

It is closer to Iranun than to Maguindanao within the Danao subgroup.

== Distribution ==
Maranao is spoken in the following provinces of:

- Entire Lanao del Sur and Lanao del Norte
- Northwestern municipalities of Maguindanao del Norte: Barira, Buldon, Parang, Matanog, Sultan Mastura, and Sultan Kudarat
- Northwestern municipalities of Cotabato: Alamada, Banisilan, Carmen, Libungan, and Pigcawayan
- Northwestern municipalities of Bukidnon: Talakag and Kalilangan
- Small parts in the coast of Zamboanga del Sur

All of which are located within the island of Mindanao in southern Philippines.

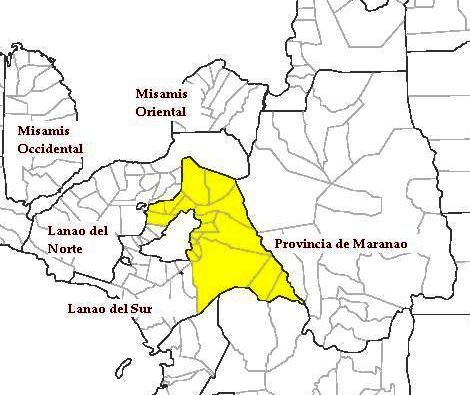

== Writing system ==
Maranao was historically written in Perso-Arabic letters called Jawi, which were known as Batang-a-Arab or Batang Arab. It is now written with Latin letters. Though there is no officially proclaimed standard orthography, Maranao is more or less written as influenced by contemporary Filipino conventions. The following are the letters used in writing out native words:

A, B, D, E, G, H, I, K, L, M, N, NG, O, P, R, S, T, U, W, Y

In general, double vowels are pronounced separately, for example, kapaar is pronounced as /kapaʔaɾ/.

The final /w/ sound in diphthongs and "w" were marked with "-o" in older orthographies, as in other Philippine languages, but both are nowadays spelled as "w". Also, "i" was used in older orthographies to transcribe /j/, which is currently spelled as "Y".

"H" is only used for Malay loanwords, and "sh" (pronounced as /ʃ/) is normally used for Arabic loanwords and names such as Ishak (Isaac).

"Di" or "j" are used to transcribe the /d͡ʒ/ sound, such as radia/raja (from the Sanskrit word for 'king', "Rāja") or the English name John.

In representing the mid central vowel (or schwa) /ə/, different authors have employed various means to represent this sound (e.g. "E" or "U"). In social media, speakers use either of the two letters or just leave it blank (e.g. saken can also be spelled sakn and sakun on the internet). Meanwhile, the Commission on the Filipino Language recommends spelling this sound using "Ë" for different Philippine languages in its 2013 Ortograpiyang Pambansa.

In a revised Maranao Dictionary by McKaughan and Macaraya in 1996, the digraph "'ae" was introduced and used to represent the supposed presence of the vowel /ɨ/. However, analysis by Lobel (2009, 2013) showed that this may actually be an allophone of /ə/ after hard consonants. McKaughan and Macaraya also used "q" for the glottal stop regardless of position. Diphthongs such as [aw, aj, oi] were spelled as "ao, ai, oi".

The orthography used in the study by Lobel (2009) was the one developed by Aleem Abdulmajeed Ansano of Taraka (1943–2008), Senator Ahmad Domocao "Domie" Alonto of Ramain (1914– 2002), and Shaiekh Abdul Azis Guroalim Saromantang of Tugaya (1923–2003). In this orthography, the "hard consonants" /pʰ, tʰ, kʰ, sʰ/ are written as "ph, th, kh, z".

== Phonology ==
Below is the sound system of Maranao including underlying phonetic features.

=== Vowels ===
Maranao has four vowel phonemes that can become more close or higher when in certain environments (see hard consonants below). The vowel raising effects of hard consonants may have led earlier studies to Although previous studies have analyzed the [ɨ] sound as a separate phoneme (written with ae) instead of a raised allophone of /ə/.

Vowels
	Front	Central	Back
Close	/i/ [ɪ ~ i]		
Mid		/ə/ [ə ~ ɨ]	/o/ [o ~ u]
Open		/a/ [a ~ ɤ]	

Vowel [e] only occurs in loanwords from Spanish through Tagalog or Cebuano and from Malay.

=== Consonants ===
According to Lobel (2013), Maranao has the following consonants:

Consonants
		Bilabial	Dental	Alveolar	Palatal	Velar	Glottal
Nasal		m		n		ŋ	
Stop	Voiceless	p	t			k	ʔ
Stop	Heavy	pʰ	tʰ			kʰ	
Stop	Voiced	b		d		ɡ	
Fricative	Voiceless			s			
Fricative	Heavy			sʰ			(h)
Flap				ɾ			
Lateral				l			
Approximant		w			j		

In Maranao, /ʔ/ is not phonemic word-initially (similar to non-Philippine English). Hence, layok aken ('friend of mine') is smoothly pronounced [la.jo.ka.kən].

Since the heavy consonants developed from consonant clusters, they are only found word-medially.

Orthography-wise, "r" is used for /ɾ/, "y" is used for /j/, and "ng" is used for /ŋ/

==== Fricative [h] ====
According to Lobel (2013), [h] only occurs in a few recent Malay loanwords:

- tohan 'God'
- tahon 'astrological sign'
- hadapan 'in front (of God)'

Earlier Arabic loanwords with "h" that entered Proto-Danao or earlier Maranao were realized as k.

- kalal 'halal (anything permissible in Islam)'
- karam 'haram (anything not permissible in Islam)',
- kadî 'hadji (title for a man who has made the Hajj pilgrimage to Mecca)'
- Kadis 'Hadith'

==== Consonant elongation ====
Consonants are also pronounced longer if preceded with a schwa /ə/. However, this process is not a form of gemination since consonant elongation in Maranao is not distinctive as seen in other Philippine languages such as Ilokano and Ibanag. Some of these are:

- tepad [təpːad] 'get off a vehicle'
- tekaw [təkːaw] 'startled; surprised'

==== Hard consonants and vowel raising ====
Since 2009, it has been proposed that previous studies on the phonology of Maranao had overlooked the presence of "heavy" consonants, these four "heavy" consonants being /p’ t’ k’ s’/. Vowels that follow these consonants are raised in position.

The four Maranao vowels (a, ə, i, o) are raised when they follow hard consonants

There are four possible environments for that determine whether the vowel will be raised or not:

1. Non-raising – /p t k s m n ŋ r w y/
2. Obligatory raising – /p’ t’ k’ s’ (h)/
  - Tohan is pronounced as [t̪o.hɤn] instead of [to.han]
3. Optional raising – /b d g/
  - Evidenced by some younger speakers writing gagaan as gegaan.
4. Transparent – /l ʔ/ – the raising from the consonant before it will "pass through" and affect the following vowel.

Similar vowel raising can be also found in Madurese.

==== Historical development ====
Consonant cluster homogenization occurred in earlier Danao and Subanon, where the articulations of the first consonant followed that of the second (Ex: *-gp- > *-bp-).

A study by Allison noted that Proto-Danao *b, *d, g* were lost in modern Maranao when found before other consonants with the same place of articulation (Ex: *bp > *p), but preserved elsewehere.

Lobel noted that this sound change actually resulted in two features of Maranao phonology: heavy consonants and raised vowels (*[-bpa-] > [-pʰɤ-]). Aspirated consonants also developed in a similar way in Southern (Lapuyan) Subanon, but without the vowel-raising.

Sound changes
Proto-Greater Central Philippine	Proto-Danao	Maguindanaon	Maranao
*-gp-, *-dp-, *-bp-	*-bp-	-bp-	-ph-
*-gt-, *-dt-, *-bt-	*-dt-	-dt-	-th-
*-gs-, *-ds-, *-bs-	*-ds-	-ds-	-z- [sʰ]
*-gk-, *-dk-, *-bk-	*-gk-	-gk-	-kh-

== Grammar ==
=== Case markers ===
In contrast to Tagalog which has three case markers (ang/ng/sa), and Iloko which has two (ti/iti), Maranao has four: (so/ko/o/sa).

Maranao Case Markers
	Common		Personal	
Case	Indefinite	Definite	Singular	Plural
Nominative (Subject)	so	i	si	siki
Ergative (Direct Object)	sa	o	i	i kisi
Oblique/Locative (Benefactor/Location) Genitive (Possessive)	sa	ko	ki	sa kisi

Curiously, the sa is indefinite in Maranao, whereas it is definite/specific in Cebuano and Tagalog.

=== Pronouns ===
Maranao pronouns can be free or bound to the word/morpheme before it.

Meaning	Nominative (free)	Nominative (bound)	Genitive/Ergative (bound)	Oblique (free)
I	saken	(a)ko	aken	raken
you (singular)	seka	ka	(ng)ka (Note: May actually be eka, and assimilates with the vowel before it, as in batî ika [ba.tɪ.ʔɪ.ka] 'your brother-in-law', and babô oka [bɤ.bu.ʔu.ka] 'your aunt'.)	reka
he/she/it	sekaniyan	sekaniyan	(n)iyan	rekaniyan
we (dual)	sekta	ta	ta	rekta
we (including you)	sektano	tano	tano	rektano
we (excluding you)	sekami	kami	(a)mi	rekami
you (plural)	sekano	kano	(n)iyo	rekano
they	siran	siran	(i)ran	kiran

=== Common words ===
Below are common words found in Maranao sentences, their translations in English, Cebuano, and Tagalog, and similar words in distant Philippine languages.

Maranao	Cebuano	Tagalog	Other PH regional language or dialect	English
na	kay	ay		is
na	dayon	tápos	ampa (Tausug)	then
a	nga	na		that is
timan	buok	piraso		piece
den	na	na	ren (Kinaray-a)	already
pen	pa	pa		will, soon
di	dili	hindi	di' (Tausug)	won't, isn't
da	wala	hindi	wala' (Tausug)	didn't
da	wala	wala	way/waruun (Tausug)	nothing
aden	adunay	mayroon	awn (Tausug), adda (Ilocano)	there is...
ino	mao		iyo (Bikol-Naga)	it is such
ago	ug	at	iban (Tausug)	and
atawa	kon, o	o	atawa (Tausug)	or
ogaid	apan, pero	ngunit, subalit, pero	sa'/sagawa'/saga'/ malayngkan (Tausug)	however, but
o di	dili pud, dili sab	hindi rin	bukun isab/bukun sab (Tausug)	nor (?)
langun	tanan	lahat	katān (Tausug)	all
imanto	karon	ngayon	bihaun (Tausug)	now
oway	oo	oo/opo	huun (Tausug)	yes
sabap	tungod, kay	dahil, kasi	sabab, kalna' or karna' (Tausug)	because
seda	isda	isda	ista' (Tausug)	fish
sapi'	baka	baka	sapi' (Maguindanaon & Tausug)	cow
pagari	igsuon	kapatid	langgung, taymanghud (Tausug)	sibling
bago	bag-o	bago	bagu (Tausug), baro (Ilocano)	new
tahon	tuig	taon	tahun (Tausug)	year
koda'	kabayo	kabayo	kura' (Tausug)	horse
sorab	suwab	talim	sulab (Tausug)	blade
doniya'	kalibotan	mundo	duniya' (Tausug)	world
dalendeg	dalugdog	kulog	dawgdug (Tausug)	thunder
sorga'	langit	langit	sulga' (Tausug)	heaven
narka', diyahanam	impyerno	impyerno	nalka'/narka', jahanam (Tausug)	hell
mataed	nindot, tsada	maganda	malingkat (Tausug)	nice, elegant
otin	utin, tintin	titi, uten	utin (Tausug)	male genitalia, penis
papanok	langgam	ibon	manuk-manuk (Tausug)	bird
diyandi'	kasabotan, saad	kasunduuan, pangako	janji' (Tausug)	agreement, promise
ngaran	ngalan	ngalan/pangalan	ngān (Tausug) nagan (Ilocano)	name

== Sample texts ==
=== Universal Declaration of Human Rights ===
Maranao:

Langon a taw na inimbawata a ndudon so kapaar ago ndatadatar sa bantogan ago kabnar. Bigan siran sa kabnar ago gagaw na aya patot a di kapakasusurota o omani isa ko kapakiphapagariya.

Cebuano:

Ang tanáng tawo kay gipakatawo nga may kagawasan ug managsama sa kaligdong. Silá gigasahan og pangisip ug tanlag ug mag-ilhanáy sa usá'g usá sa diwà managsoon.

Tagalog:

Ang lahát ng tao'y isinilang na malayà at pantáy-pantáy sa karangalan at mga karapatán. Silá'y pinagkalooban ng katwiran at budhî at dapat magpalagayan ang isa't isá sa diwà ng pagkákápatiran.

English:

All human beings are born free and equal in dignity and rights. They are endowed with reason and conscience and should act towards one another in a spirit of brotherhood.

=== Noun phrases ===
These phrases were taken from Alonto's Maranao Drills.
Legend: topic, direct object, indirect object, possessive, verb

Topic
Maranao	Cebuano	English
Pephamasa so babay sa seda.	Gapalít ang babaye og isdà.	The woman is buying fish.
Pephamasa si Rocaya sa seda.	Gapalít si Rocaya og isdà.	Rocaya is buying fish.
Pephamasa siki Tearde sa seda.	Gapalít siláng Tearde og isdà.	Tearde and friends are buying fish.
Pephamasa ako sa seda.	Gapalít ko og isdà.	I am buying fish.
Pephamasa ka sa seda.	Gapalít ka og isdà.	You are buying fish.
Pephamasa sekaniyan sa seda.	Gapalít silá og isdà.	He/she is buying fish.
Pephamasa ta sa seda.	Gapalít tang duhá og isdà.	You and I are buying fish.
Pephamasa tano sa seda.	Gapalít ta og isdà.	We (all of us) are buying fish.
Pephamasa kami sa seda.	Gapalít kamí og isdà.	We (excl. you) are buying fish.
Pephamasa kano sa seda.	Gapalít kitá og isdà.	We (incl. you) are buying fish.
Pephamasa siran sa seda.	Gapalít silá og isdà.	They are buying fish.
Pephamasa aya sa seda.	Gapalít ni siyá og isdà.	This guy are buying fish.
Pephamasa nan sa seda.	Gapalít nâ siyá og isdà.	That guy near you is buying fish.
Pephamasa oto sa seda.	Gapalít kató siyá og isdà.	That guy over there is buying fish.

Possessive
Maranao	Cebuano	English
Mala i arga so bangkala o maistra.	Mahál ang saninà sa maestra.	The teacher's clothes are expensive.
Mala i arga so bangkala i Akmad.	Mahál ang saninà ni Akmad.	Akmad's clothes are expensive.
Mala i arga so bangkala i kisi Akmad.	Mahál ang saninà niláng Akmad.	Akmad and co.'s clothes are expensive.
Mala i arga so bangkala aken.	Mahál ang saninà nakò.	My clothes are expensive.
Mala i arga so bangkala aka.	Mahál ang saninà nimo.	Your clothes are expensive.
Mala i arga so bangkala iyan.	Mahál ang saninà niya.	His/her clothes are expensive.
Mala i arga so bangkala ta.	Mahál ang saninà natong duhá.	Our (you and me) clothes are expensive.
Mala i arga so bangkala tano.	Mahál ang saninà natò.	Our (all of us) clothes are expensive.
Mala i arga so bangkala ami.	Mahál ang saninà namò.	Our (excl. you) clothes are expensive.
Mala i arga so bangkala iyo.	Mahál ang saninà ninyo	Our (incl. you) clothes are expensive.
Mala i arga so bangkala iran.	Mahál ang saninà nila.	Their clothes are expensive.
Mala i arga a bangkala ini.	Mahál ni nga sanina.	This clothing is expensive.
Mala i arga a bangkala a nan.	Mahál nâ nga saninà.	That (with you) clothing is expensive.
Mala i arga a bangkala oto.	Mahál to nga saninà.	That (over there) clothing is expensive.

Referent
Maranao	Cebuano	English
Somiyong so panginginseda sa maistra.	Miadto ang mangingisdà sa maistra.	The fisherman went to the teacher.
Somiyong so panginginseda ki Akmad.	Miadto ang mangingisdà kang Akmad.	The fisherman went to Akmad.
Somiyong so panginginseda sa kisi Akmad.	Miadto ang mangingisdà ilang Akmad.	The fisherman went to Akmad and family/friends.
Somiyong so panginginseda sii raken.	Miadto ang mangingisdà sa akoa.	The fisherman went to me.
Somiyong so panginginseda sa reka.	Miadto ang mangingisdà sa imoha.	The fisherman went to you.
Somiyong so panginginseda sa rekaniyan.	Miadto ang mangingisdà sa iyaha.	The fisherman went to him/her.
Somiyong so panginginseda sii rektano.	Miadto ang mangingisdà sa atoa.	The fisherman went to us.
Somiyong so panginginseda sii rekami.	Miadto ang mangingisdà sa amoa.	The fisherman went to ours.
Somiyong so panginginseda sa rekiyo.	Miadto ang mangingisdà sa inyoha.	The fisherman went to yours.
Somiyong so panginginseda sa rekiran.	Miadto ang mangingisdà sa ilaha.	The fisherman went to their house.
Somiyong so panginginseda saya.	Miadto ang mangingisda dirí/dinhí.	The fisherman went here.
Somiyong so panginginseda san.	Miadto ang mangingisdà dirâ/dinhâ.	The fisherman went there (near you).
Somiyong so panginginseda roo.	Miadto ang mangingisdà didto/diadto.	The fisherman went there (far away).

=== Time and Space ===
Time
Maranao	Cebuano	English
Anda i kiyapakaoma ngka sa Marawi?	Anus-a'y balik nimo sa Marawi? (Literal)	When was your arrival in Marawi? (Literal)
Anda i kiyapakaoma ngka sa Marawi?	Kanus-a ra ka mibalik og Marawi? (Actual)	When did you arrive here in Marawi? (Actual)
Isako Isnin.	Atóng miaging Lunes.	Last Monday.
Isako Salasa.	Atóng miaging Martes.	Last Tuesday.
Isako Arbaa.	Atóng miaging Mirkules.	Last Wednesday.
Isako Kamis.	Atóng miaging Huybes.	Last Thursday.
Isako Diyamaat.	Atóng miaging Biyernes.	Last Friday.
Isako Sapto.	Atóng miaging Sabado.	Last Saturday.
Isako Akad.	Atóng miaging Dominggo.	Last Sunday.
Antonaa oras i kiyasong ka sa sine?	Unsa nga oras ang pag-adto nimo sa sinehán? (Literal)	What time was your travel to the movies?(Literal)
Antonaa oras i kiyasong ka sa sine?	Unsang orasa ka miadto sa sinehán? (Actual)	What time did you go to the movies? (Actual)
Manga ala una i midiya .	Mga ala una i midiya .	Around one thirty.
Anda i kambaling ka sa Amerika?	Kanus-a ang pagbalik nimo sa Amerika? (Literal)	When will your return to America be?(Literal)
Anda i kambaling ka sa Amerika?	Kanus-a ka mobalik og Amerika? (Actual)	When will you return to Amerika? (Actual)
Anda i kiyabaling ka sa Amerika poon sa Saudi?	Anus-a ang balik nimo sa Amerika gikan sa Saudi?(Literal)	When was your return from Saudi to America?(Literal)
Anda i kiyabaling ka sa Amerika poon sa Saudi?	Anus-a ra ka mibalik sa Amerika gikan og Saudi? (Actual)	When did you return to America from Saudi? (Actual)

Space
Maranao	Cebuano	English
sa liwawaw a lamisan	sa ibabaw/taas sa lamisa	on top of the table
sa dilalem a lamisan	sa ilalom sa lamisa	beneath of the table
sa kilid a lamisan	sa kilid sa lamisa	to the side of the table
sa poro a lamisan	sa suok sa lamisa	on the corner of the table
sa diwang a lamisan	sa walá sa lamisa	to the left of the table
sa kawanan a lamisan	sa tuó sa lamisa	to the right of the table
sa soled a Masgit	sa sulód sa Mosque	inside of the Mosque
sa liyo a Masgit	sa gawás sa Mosque	outside of the Mosque
sa una-an a Masgit	sa unahan sa Mosque	just past the Mosque
sa talikudan a Masgit	sa likód/luyó sa Mosque	behind of the Mosque
sa pantag a Masgit	sa atubangan sa Mosque	in front of the Mosque

=== Verbs and Time ===
Time
Maranao	Cebuano	English
Mbaling siran imanto.		They are going home now.
Phaginom siran oman gawii.		They drink every day.
Mitharo siran kagai.		They spoke yesterday.
Pelalakaw siran roo mapita.		They will walk tomorrow.
Miyakasong siran roo den.		They have gone there already.
Miyakailay ako den. sa totul.		I was able to see the report.
Miyakailay ako sa pirak sa lalan.		I happened to see some money on the road.
Makapengadi pen siran.		They can still study.
Petero kano pasin.		Please speak, (you guys).

=== Negatives ===
Time
Type	Maranao	Cebuano	English
Present / Progressive	Penggalebek ka oman gawii?	Gatrabaho ka kada adlaw?	Do you work every day?
	Di!	Dilì!	No, I don't!
Past	Mitharo ka kagiya?	Misturya ka kaganina?	Did you speak a while ago?
	Da!	Walâ!	No, I didn't!
Future	Phatawag ka roo imanto?	Motawag ka unyâ?	Will you call later on?
	Di!	Dilì!	No, I won't!
Possessions	Aden a karoma ngka?	Aduna ba ka'y asawa?	Do you have a wife?
	Da!	Walâ!	No, I don't have!
Qualities	Abogado kabesen?	Abogado ba ka?	Are you a lawyer?
	Di!	Dilì!	No, I'm not!

=== Manga, A, Aden, Da ===
Time
Maranao	Cebuano	English
Piyamasa aken so manga seda.	Palitón nakò ang mga isdà.	I am buying fish.
Mapiya a mayor si Akmad.	Maayo nga mayór si Akmad.	Akmad is a good mayor.
Aden a maistro aken.	Anaa ang maistro nako. (Literal)	My teacher exists (Literal)
Aden a maistro aken.	Aduna ko'y maistro. (Actual)	I have a teacher. (Actual)
Da a kwarta aken.	Walâ ang kwarta nako. (Literal)	My money does not exist. (Literal)
Da a kwarta aken.	Walâ ko'y kwarta. (Actual)	I don't have money. (Actual)

=== Object-focus Sentences ===
Time
Tense	Maranao	Cebuano	English
Present	Pemasaan ko so libro.	Palitón nakò ang libro.	I am buying book.
Past	Pipesa ko so walay.	Gibaligyà nakò ang baláy.	I sold the house.
Present	Pemasaan aken so libro.	Palitón nakò ang libro.	I am buying book.
Past	Piyamasa aken so kamays.	Palitón nako ang mais.	I bought the corn.
Future (-en)	Barbikiun giya i.	Barbikyuhon nakò ni.	I will barbecue this.
Future (-en)	Kupiyaan (Note: The /e/ was assimilated as [a] due to -a from "kupiya.") giya i.	Kopyahon nakò ni.	I will copy this.
Future (i-)	Ipelebeng aken anan.	Ilubóng nakò nâ.	I will say that.
Future (i-)	Imbegay aken anan.	Ihatag nakò nâ.	I will barbecue that.
Future (-an)	Pembisitaan aken anan.	Bisitahan nakò nâ.	I will visit that.
Future (-an)	Bayadan aken anan.	Bayran nakò nâ.	I will pay that.
Command (-a)	Pageda ngka ini.	Sakyi ni.	Ride this.
Command (-an)	Sigopan angka nan.	Suyopi nâ.	Smoke that.
Command (-i)	Galidi ngka nan.	Aniha nâ.	Harvest that.
== See also ==
- Languages of the Philippines
