= Lanao (province) =

Former province of the Philippines

Coordinates: 10°09′N 124°47′E

Lanao Ranao
- Province of the Philippines
- 1914-1959
- Location of the historical province of Lanao.
- Capital: Dansalan
- History
  - Established: 1914
  - Disestablished: 1959
Preceded by	Succeeded by
Moro Province	Lanao del Norte; Lanao del Sur
- Today part of: · Lanao del Norte · Lanao del Sur

Lanao was a province of the Philippines from 1914 to 1959. Today, the province comprises Lanao del Norte and Lanao del Sur.

== Etymology ==
The term "Lanao" is derived from a Maranao word "Ranao" meaning a body of water. "Meranau" means lake dweller. They are the natives of the place occupying the land around Lake Lanao, which is situated at the central part of Lanao del Sur. Lanao, applies to the entire area before its division. When it was divided into two provinces, the southern portion became Lanao del Sur and the northern part became Lanao del Norte.

== History ==
Dansalan, Marawi's old name, was explored by the Spaniards as early as 1639. It is said that at that time, Marawi was already the citadel of Malayan-Arabic culture in Mindanao. Feeling the pulse of strong refusal among its inhabitants to adopt Christianity, the Spaniards abandoned the project of colonizing the area. Dansalan, physically speaking, would have satisfactorily qualified to become a town or municipality during the time of said exploration based on the Spanish Policy of "Ecclesiastical Administration" except for fanatical resistance of the natives who were mostly under Muslim rule.

A strong Spanish expedition to conquer the Maranaos was fielded in 1891 during the time of Governor-General Valeriano Weyler, but this force was driven back to Iligan after failing to capture Dansalan. In 1895, Governor-General Ramón Blanco sent a stronger force to take Marawi that thanks to superior firepower finally overrun the last defenses. The Spanish forces won a decisive victory and were able to erect a garrison in Dansalan and they already took with them Chabacanos and Chabacano-speaking Muslims from Zamboanga and Basilan and Cebuanos. However, they had to abandon it just four years later after the outbreak of the Spanish–American War in 1898, leaving it on the hands of the new American colonizers, who imposed their own rule on the population.

=== American occupation ===
On May 24, 1904, the American Colonial Government proclaimed Dansalan a regular Municipality. The Philippines was still under the Commonwealth regime of the Americans when Dansalan was chartered into a city in 1904. In 1914, the Department of Mindanao and Sulu was created and Lanao was converted as a province.

=== Division ===
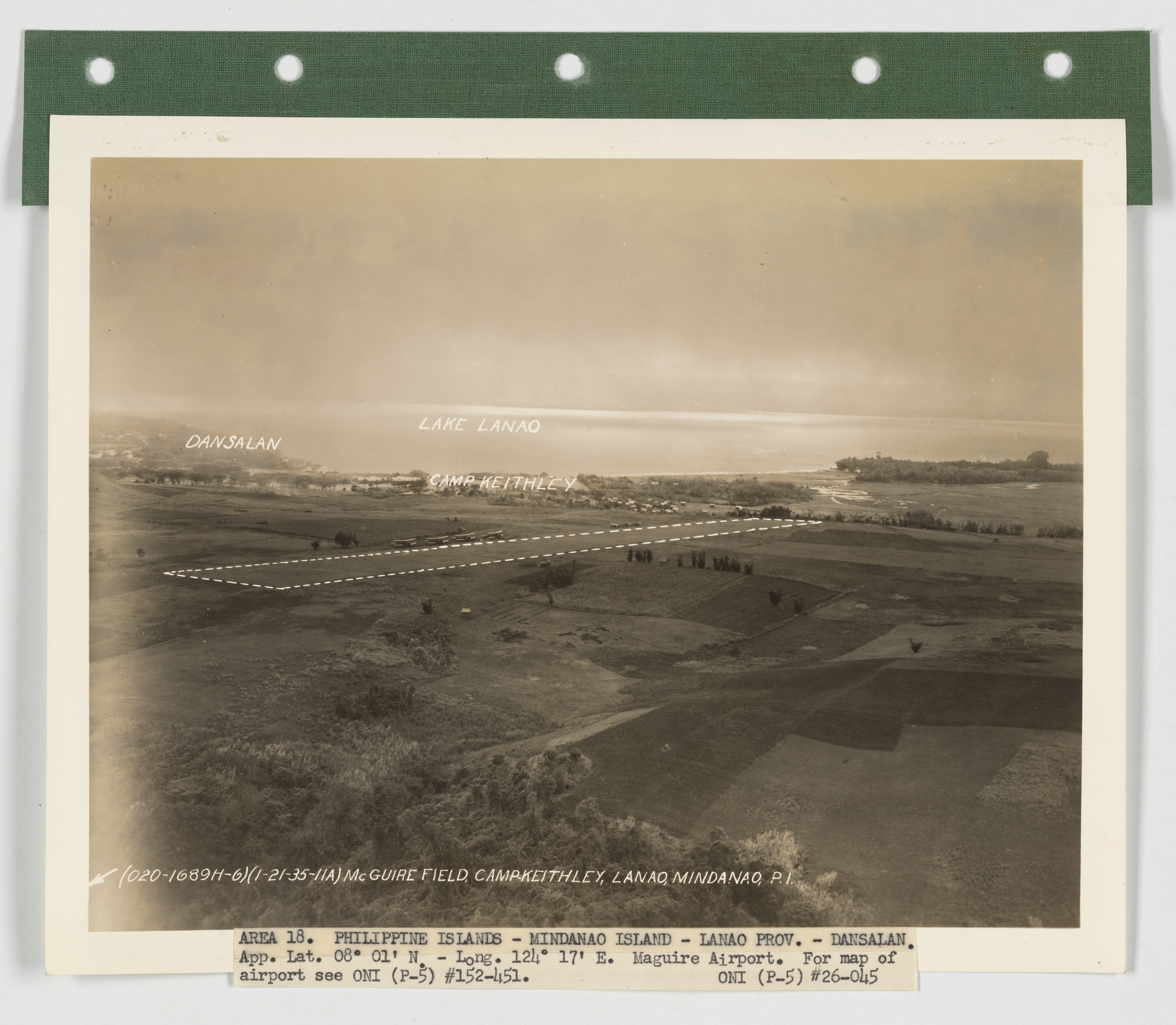
Landing field in Dansalan, photographed in 1932

The Department of Mindanao and Sulu was provided with autonomous government beginning September 1, 1914, through Act No. 2408 enacted on July 23, 1914. Bukidnon sub-province and the former Moro Province districts of Cotabato, Davao, Lanao, Sulu, and Zamboanga were converted to provinces.

The passage of Republic Act No. 2228 divided Lanao into two (2) provinces giving birth to Lanao del Norte and Lanao del Sur. The new province was inaugurated on July 4, 1959, making Iligan City as the capital of the north and Marawi City for the south. During the establishment process of the Autonomous Region in Muslim Mindanao, Lanao del Sur (and later Marawi City) voted to be part of the new autonomous region, while Lanao del Norte chose to remain in Northern Mindanao.

Meranaw province was created from Lanao del Sur on October 4, 1971, through Republic Act No. 6406, but this remained unorganized due to the disruption caused by the declaration of martial law in the Philippines.

== Geography ==
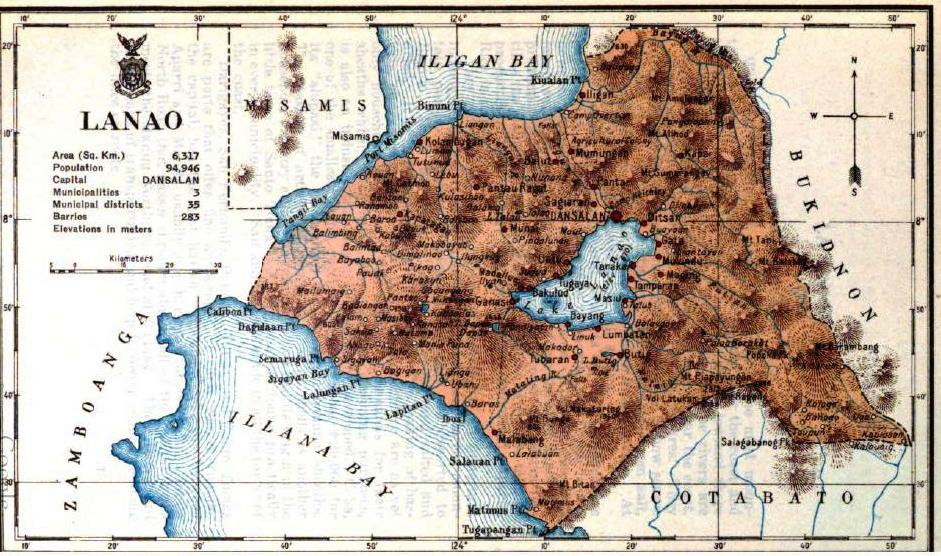
Lanao province map in 1918

By the time of its division in 1965, Lanao comprised 10 municipalities:

- Bacolod
- Balo-i
- Baroy
- Caromatan
- Kapatagan
- Kauswagan
- Kolambugan
- Lala
- Maigo
- Malabang
- Tubod

Lanao also comprised two cities:

- Marawi
- Iligan

Lanao also composed of 30 municipal districts:

- Bacolod-Grande
- Balindong
- Bayang
- Binidayan
- Babong (Bubong)
- Butig
- Ganassi
- Kapai
- Lumba-Bayabao
- Lumbatan
- Madalum
- Madamba
- Marantao
- Masiu
- Matungao
- Mulondo (Mulondo)
- Munai
- Nunungan
- Pantao Ragat
- Poona Bayabao
- Pualas
- Ramain
- Saguiaran
- Tamparan
- Tangcal
- Taraka
- Tatarikan
- Tubaran
- Tugaya
- Wao

Marawi (formerly Dansalan until 1956) served as the provincial capital.

== Government ==
The governor of Lanao (Filipino: Punong Panlalawigan ng Lanao), was the chief executive of the provincial government of Lanao province. Salvador T. Lluch served as the last governor of undivided Lanao since his election in 1955 until the creation of the provinces of Lanao del Norte and Lanao del Sur in 1959.

Provincial Governor of Undivided Lanao
#	Image	Name	Term in Office		Electoral History
#	Image	Name	Start	End	
1		Salvador T. Lluch	1954	1955	Appointed by President Ramon Magsaysay
1		Salvador T. Lluch	1955	1959	Elected
Province divided into two.

== See also ==
- Legislative district of Lanao
- Lanao del Norte
- Lanao del Sur
- Former provinces of the Philippines
