= List of current indigenous Bangsamoro royal title holders =

This is a list of current title holders of the 16 royal houses of Lanao, the sultanates of Sulu, Maguindanao, and Tagoloan, and the royal sultanates alliances of the Confederate States of Lanao. Note that all of these hold no political power in the Philippines. Article VI, Section 31 of the 1987 Philippine Constitution states that "no law granting a title of royalty or nobility shall be enacted," effectively prohibiting official state recognition of sultanates or hereditary titles across the archipelago. These are purely indigenous organizational and cultural leadership systems of the Bangsamoro people, preserved under Republic Act No. 8371. Despite lacking political power, these traditional royal houses and sultanates are cornerstone symbols of Bangsamoro cultural and historical identity dating back to the 15th century, facilitating grassroots conflict resolution and fostering communal unity to this day.

== Poona Bayabao ==
Royal Title	Current holder	Refs
Sultan of Bansayan	Saad Amate	
Sultan of Rogan	Bangcola Adtha	
Sultan of Taporog	Bangsaan Unte	

== Lumba Bayabao ==
Royal Title	Current holder	Refs
Sultan of Bacolod	Amanah Bantogaranao	
Sultan of Borokot	Aratok Bandira	
Sultan of Maribo	Anwar Hadji Sapiin	
Sultan of Minitupad	Hadji Alawi Galo	

== Mala Bayabao ==
Royal Title	Current holder	Refs
Sultan of Ditsaan	Abdulnaser Adiong	
Sultan of Ramain	Cabili Cali	

== East Unayan ==
Royal Title	Current holder	Refs
Sultan of Butig	Monabantog Kiram	
Sultan a Dumalondong of Butig	Nasrollah Conding	

== West Unayan ==
Royal Title	Current holder	Refs
Sultan of Bayang	Maclis Balt	
Sultan of Pagayawan	Sailaney Benito	

== East and West Masiu ==
Royal Title	Current holder	Refs
Sultan of Masiu	Mohammad Ben-Usman	
Datu a Cabugatan of Masiu	Mohammad Zain Mautante	

=== 6 Traditional Sultanates of West Masiu ===
Royal Title	Current holder	Refs
Sultan of Raya (Capital of West Masiu)	Dimapuno Ramos Sr.	
Sultan of Bacolod Grande	Hadji Sadic Macaborod	
Sultan of Kalawi	Abdulmohaimen Dipatuan	
Sultan of Madalum	Elias Alawi	
Sultan of Tugaya	Moamar Abdullatiph	
Sultan of Wato	Edres Manalocon	

== Balo-i ==
Royal Title	Current holder	Refs
Sultan of Balo-i	Ysmael Ali	

== Sulu ==
Royal Title	Current holder	Refs
Sultan of Sulu	Hadji Muedzul-Lail Tan Kiram	

== Maguindanao ==
Royal Title	Current holder	Refs
Sultan of Maguindanao	Zulkarnain Mastura Kudarat VI (Maguindanaon claimant)	
Sultan of Maguindanao	Macapado Benito Sr. (Maranao claimant)	

== Tagoloan ==
Royal Title	Current holder	Refs
Sultan of Tagoloan	Maglangit Paute	

== Royal Sultanates Alliances of the Confederate States of Lanao ==
Royal Title	Current holder	Refs
Sultan of Balabagan	Wakid Interino	
Sultan of Kablangan	Mashiding Lomandong	
Sultan of Malabang	Somerado Cumilao	
Sultan of Picong	Rasad Balindong	
Sultan of Tubok	Masideng Salic	
