= List of renamed cities and municipalities in the Philippines =

This is a list of renamed cities and municipalities in the Philippines.

== Luzon ==
=== Abra ===
- Patoc → Alfonso XII → Patoc → Peñarrubia (1903)
- San Jose de Manabo → Manabo
- Villavieja → Villa-Pilar (1903) → Pilar

=== Albay ===
- Albay → Legaspi (1925) → Legazpi
- Budiao → Cagsaua → Salcedo (1772) → Daraga → Locsin (1959) → Daraga (1967)
- Libog → Santo Domingo (1959)
- Quipia → Jovellar (1882)
- Santa Florentina → Rapu-Rapu
- Tivi → Tiwi

=== Apayao ===
- Bayag → Calanasan (1967)
- Cabugaoan → Kabugao
- Tauit → Tawit → Pudtol

=== Aurora ===
- San Jose de Casignan → Maria Aurora

=== Bataan ===
- Llana Hermosa → Hermosa
- Moron → Morong (1955)
- San Juan de Dinalupijan → Dinalupihan
- Udyong → Orion

=== Batanes ===
- San Carlos de Marigatao → Mahatao
- San Jose de Ivana → Ivana
- San Vicente de Sabtan → Sabtang
- Santa Maria de Mayan → Mayan → Itbayat
- Santo Domingo de Basco → Basco

=== Batangas ===
- San Juan de Bocboc → Bolbok (1914) → San Juan

=== Benguet ===
- Atoc → Atok
- Cabayan → Kabayan
- Capangan → Kapangan
- Quibungan → Kibungan

=== Bulacan ===
- Baliuag → Baliwag
- Bigaa → Balagtas (1966)
- Quingua → Plaridel (1936)
- San Miguel de Mayumo → San Miguel
- Santa Maria de Pandi → Santa Maria

=== Cagayan ===
- Cabug → Enrile
- Cabarungan → Faire → Santo Niño (1969)
- Fulay → Alcala
- Malaueg → Rizal
- Malolokit/Naluqui → Sanchez-Mira
- Langangan → Santa Praxedes (1964)
- Nueva Segovia → Lal-lo
- San Bartolome de Calayan → Calayan

=== Camarines Norte ===
- Imelda → San Lorenzo Ruiz (1989)
- Indan → Tacboan → Vinzons (1945)
- Mambulao → Jose Panganiban (1934)

=== Camarines Sur ===
- Anderson → Garchitorena (1949)
- Mabatobato → Ocampo (1949)
- Nueva Caceres → Naga (1919)
- Parubcan → Presentacion (1969)

=== Catanduanes ===
- Calolbon → San Andres (1964)
- Jimoto → Gigmoto
- Jose Panganiban → Payo (1957) → Panganiban (1959)

=== Cavite ===
- Bailen → General Emilio Aguinaldo (1965) → Bailen (2012; never ratified in a plebiscite)
- Cavite El Viejo → Cavite Viejo → Kawit (1907)
- Cavite La Punta → Cavite Nuevo → Cavite (1903)
- Mendez Nuñez → Mendez
- Perez Dasmariñas → Dasmariñas (1917)
- San Francisco de Malabon → Malabon (1914) → General Trias (1920)
- Santa Cruz de Malabon → Tanza (1914)
- Tejeros → Salinas → Rosario (1846)

=== Ifugao ===
- Potia → Lista (1988) → Alfonso Lista
- Quiangan → Kiangan

=== Ilocos Norte ===
- Adan → Adams
- Banna → Espiritu (1964) → Banna (1995)
- Nagpartian → Burgos (1914)
- San Miguel → Sarrat (1916)

=== Ilocos Sur ===
- Angaki → Quirino (1964)
- Bauguen → Salcedo (1957)
- Concepcion → Gregorio del Pilar (1955)
- Lapog → San Juan (1961)
- Nueva Coveta → Burgos
- Santa Catalina de Baba → Santa
- Santa Catalina Virgen y Martir (V. y M.) → Santa Catalina
- Sin-nait → Sinait

=== Isabela ===
- Abbag → Calering → Calanusian → Reina Mercedes
- Angadanan Nuevo → Angadanan
- Angadanan Viejo → Alicia
- Antatet → Luna (1951)
- Cabagan Nuevo → Cabagan
- Cabagan Viejo → San Pablo
- Callang → San Manuel (1965)
- Camarag → Echagüe → Echague
- Carig → Santiago de Carig → Santiago (1910)
- Dalig → Aurora
- Estella → Cordon
- Magsaysay → Delfin Albano (1982)

=== Kalinga ===
- Liwan → Rizal (1971)

=== La Union ===
- Bagnotan → Bacnotan
- Baoang → Bauang
- Cava → Caba
- Disdis → Burgos (1925)
- Namacpacan → Luna (1906)

=== Laguna ===
- Caboan → San Miguel de Caboan → Santa Maria de Caboan → Santa Maria
- Guiling-guiling → Siniloan
- Kalamba → Calamba
- Lilio → Liliw
- Longos → Kalayaan (1956)
- Magdalena de Ambling → Magdalena
- Majayjay → Mahayhay → Majayjay
- Malabanan → Biñan
- Nasonog de Majayjay → Luisiana
- Pinagsangahan → Pagsanjan (1688)
- Paquil → Pakil
- Sampalok→ San Pablo Delos Montes→ San Pablo
- San Pedro de Tunasan → San Pedro (1914)
- Santa Rosa de Lima → Santa Rosa
- Tabuco → Kabuyaw → Cabuyao (1571)
- Trenchera → Alaminos

=== Marinduque ===
- Santa Cruz de Napo → Santa Cruz

=== Masbate ===
- Limbuhan → Pio V. Corpuz (1954)

=== Metro Manila ===
- Caloocan → Kalookan → Caloocan
- Las Peñas → Las Piñas
- Mariquina → Marikina (1901)
- Polo → Valenzuela (1963)
- Pineda → Pasay (1901) → Rizal City (1947) → Pasay (1950)
- San Felipe Neri → Mandaluyong (1931)
- San Jose de Navotas → Navotas
- San Juan del Monte → San Juan
- San Pedro de Macati → Makati (1914)
- Tambobon → Malabon

=== Mountain Province ===
- Cayan → Kayan → Tadian (1959)

=== Nueva Ecija ===
- Bitulok → Sabani (1953) → Gabaldon (1955)
- Santor → Bongabon
- Papaya → General Tinio (1957)
- San Juan de Guimba → Guimba (1914)

=== Nueva Vizcaya ===
- Afanas/Ajanas → Aritao
- Cayapa → Kayapa
- Lumabang → Solano
- Ibung → Villaverde (1959)
- Imugan → Santa Fe (1959)

=== Occidental Mindoro ===
- Irirun → Calintaan
- Mangarin →San Jose
- Santa Cruz de Mindoro → Santa Cruz

=== Oriental Mindoro ===
- Subaan → San Teodoro
- San Pedro → Bulalacao (1969)

=== Palawan ===
- Bacuit → El Nido (1954)
- Linapacan → Gaudencio E. Abordo (1988) → Linapacan
- Marcos → Dr. Jose P. Rizal (1988) → Rizal
- Principe Alfonso → Balabac
- Puerto De La Princesa (1863) → Puerto Princesa

=== Pampanga ===
- Culiat → Angeles (1829)
- Magalan → Magalang
- San Miguel de Masantol → Masantol (1907)
- Sexmoan → Sasmuan (1991)
- Wawa → Guagua

=== Pangasinan ===
- Angio → San Fabian
- Bacnotan → Dagupan
- Balincaguin → Mabini (1929)
- Binalatongan → San Carlos
- Bulaoen → Alava → Sison (1918)
- Salasa → Bugallon (1921)
- San Isidro de Potot → Burgos (1914)
- San Isidro Labrador → Labrador (1939)
- San Vicente de Dasol → Dasol (1903)

=== Quezon ===
- Binangonan de Lampon → Infanta (1902)
- Bondo → Aurora (1940) → San Francisco (1967)
- Hingoso → General Luna
- Laguimanoc → Padre Burgos
- Puerto Real → Real
- Nuestra Senora de los Dolores → Dolores
- Peris → Piris → Buenavista

=== Rizal ===
- Biñangonan → Binangonan
- Montalban → Rodriguez (1982)

=== Romblon ===
- Azagra → San Fernando
- Badajoz → San Agustin (1957)
- Despujols → San Andres (1961)
- Imelda → Santa Maria (1988)
- Jones → Banton (1959)
- Magallanes → Magdiwang

=== Sorsogon ===
- Busaingan → Santa Magdalena
- Montufar → Prieto Diaz

=== Tarlac ===
- San Miguel de Camiling → Camiling

=== Zambales ===
- Olongapo → President Magsaysay City (1971) → Olongapo

== Visayas ==
=== Aklan ===
- Calivo → Kalibo
- Jimeno → Altavas
- Lagatic → New Washington
- Navas → Nabas (1906)
- Taft → Makato
- Tierra Alta → Lezo

=== Antique ===
- Antique → Hamtic
- Dao → Tobias Fornier (1978)
- Nalupa Nuevo → Barboza → Barbaza

=== Biliran ===
- Almeria → Kawayan (1907)

=== Bohol ===
- Batuanan → Alicia (1949)
- Borja → Sagbayan (1957)
- Ipil → Trinidad (1947)
- Malabooch → Malabohoc → Dunggoan → Maribojoc
- Mariveles → Dauis
- Pitogo → President Carlos P. Garcia (1977)
- San Jacinto → Catigbian (1954)
- Vilar → Bilar

=== Capiz ===
- Capiz → Roxas (1951)
- Lutod-lutod → President Roxas

=== Cebu ===
- Balud → Minglanilla (1858)
- Cordoba → Cordova
- Opon → Lapu-Lapu (1961)

=== Eastern Samar ===
- Lanang → Llorente (1903)
- Lauaan → Lawaan
- Tubig → Taft (1903)

=== Guimaras ===
- Nagaba → Jordan (1902)

=== Iloilo ===
- Badiang → Carles (1862)
- Lucena → New Lucena (1955)

=== Leyte ===
- Bugho → Javier (1965)
- Quiot → Isabel
- San Isidro de Campo → San Isidro
- Santo Niño and San Jose → Tacloban (1950)

=== Negros Occidental ===
- Arguelles → Magallanes → Sagay (1906)
- Asia → Hinoba-an (1959)
- Cavancalan → Kabankalan (1907)
- Ginigaran → Hinigaran
- Jimamailan → Himamaylan
- Magallon → Moises Padilla (1957)
- Minuluan → Talisay
- San Juan de Ilog → Ilog
- Saravia → Enrique B. Magalona (1967)

=== Negros Oriental ===
- Ayuquitan → Amlan (1950)
- Guijulungan → Guijulugan → Guihulngan
- Nueva Valencia → Luzurriaga → Valencia (1948)
- Payabon → Bindoy (1959)
- Tolon → Tolon Nuevo → New Tolong → Bayawan (1952)

=== Northern Samar ===
- Binuntuan → Las Navas
- La Granja → Allen (1903)
- Laguan → Laoang

=== Samar ===
- Bangajon → Gandara
- Hibatang → Calbayog
- Magsohong → Santa Margarita (1892)
- Paranas → Wright → Paranas (1988)
- Pinabagdao → Pinabacdao

=== Siquijor ===
- Canoan → Larena
- Lacy → Lazi

=== Southern Leyte ===
- Cabalian → San Juan (1961)
- San Ricardo → Pintuyan (1907)

== Mindanao ==
=== Agusan del Norte ===
- Mina-ano → Remedios T. Romualdez

=== Agusan del Sur ===
- Hagpa → San Francisco (1955)

=== Bukidnon ===
- Maluko → Manolo Fortich (1957)

=== Davao de Oro ===
- Doña Alicia → Mabini (1954)
- New Leyte → Maco
- San Mariano → Maragusan (1988)
- San Vicente → Laak (1994)

=== Davao del Norte ===
- Saug → Asuncion (1957)
- Magugpo → Tagum
- San Isidro → Sawata (2026)

=== Davao del Sur ===
- Nueva Vergara → Davao (1868)

=== Davao Occidental ===
- Trinidad → Jose Abad Santos (1955)

=== Davao Oriental ===
- Sigaboy → Governor Generoso

=== Dinagat Islands ===
- Albor → Libjo (1967)
- Rizal → Basilisa (1969)

=== Lanao del Norte ===
- Karomatan → Sultan Naga Dimaporo
- Linamon → Tomas Cabili (1983) → Linamon

=== Lanao del Sur ===
- Bacolod Grande → Bacolod-Kalawi (1994)
- Dansalan → Marawi (1956)
- Sultan Gumander → Picong (2006)
- Tatarikan → Pagayawan
- Watu → Balindong

=== Maguindanao del Norte ===
- Dinaig → Datu Odin Sinsuat
- Nuling → Sultan Kudarat (1969)
- Talitay →Sultan Sumagka (2008) → Talitay
- Tumbao → Kabuntalan (1976)

=== Maguindanao del Sur ===
- Dulawan → Datu Piang (1954)
- Lambayong → Sultan sa Barongis (1959)
- Maganoy → Shariff Aguak
- Pagagawan → Datu Montawal (2003)

=== Misamis Occidental ===
- Don Mariano Marcos → Don Victoriano (1990)
- Misamis → Ozamiz (1948)
- Regidor → Tangub (1930)

=== Misamis Oriental ===
- Cagayan de Misamis → Cagayan → Cagayan de Oro (1950)
- Linugas → Magsaysay (1957)
- Quinoguitan → Kinoguitan
- Tagnipa → El Salvador

=== South Cotabato ===
- Boayen → Buayan → Dadiangas → General Santos (1954)
- Marbel → Koronadal

=== Sultan Kudarat ===
- Mariano Marcos → Lambayong (1988)

=== Sulu ===
- Marungas → Hadji Panglima Tahil
- New Panamao → Panglima Estino
- Pandami → Lapak (1992) → Pandami
- Talipao → Arolas Tulawie (1984) → Talipao
- Tongkil → Banguingui

=== Surigao del Norte ===
- Anao-aon → San Francisco (1971)
- Cabuntog → General Luna (1929)
- Numancia → Del Carmen (1966)
- Sapao → Santa Monica (1967)

=== Surigao del Sur ===
- Jinatuan → Hinatuan
- Linguig → Lingig
- Oteiza → Marihatag (1955)

=== Tawi-Tawi ===
- Balimbing → Panglima Sugala (1991)
- Cagayan de Sulu → Cagayan de Tawi-Tawi (1984) → Mapun (1988)
- Taganak → Turtle Islands

=== Zamboanga del Norte ===
- Bacungan → Leon B. Postigo (1989)
- Dipag → Dipolog (1913)
- Lubungan → Katipunan (1936)
- New Piñan → Piñan (1960)
- Ponot → Jose Dalman (1983)

=== Zamboanga del Sur ===
- Don Mariano Marcos → Sominot (1988)
- Liargo → Ramon Magsaysay

== See also ==
- List of cities in the Philippines
- Municipalities of the Philippines
