= Shiek Abdulazis Guroalim Saromantang =

Maranao language Qur'an translator

Shiek Abdulazis Guroalim Saromantang is a Maranao, an Ulama, and a specialist in Arabic sayings in the Qur’an. He was the first Filipino Muslim who translated Qur’an into Maranao language. He was a former mayor of Tugaya, Lanao del Sur.

== Qur'an translation in Maranao Language ==
Ustadz Muhammad Sulaiman, a Maguindanaon, criticized Saromantang's second chapter translation on the Qur'an telling the story about "Moses." Two Maranao people Jamil Tamano and Saromantang's grandson Rasol Abbas defended the criticism as Lanao del Sur and Maguindanao have different native language.

== See also ==
- Maranao darangen (Native language in Lanao provinces used in some translations of Saromantang)
- Maguindanaon language (Native language in Maguindanao province)
- Qur'an Translation (Brief history)
- Penterjemahan Al-Quran (Wikipedia page: Malay and Indonesian on the Qur'an Translation)
