= Lanao del Sur's 7th parliamentary district =

Parliamentary district for the Bangsamoro Parliament

- Constituency for the Bangsamoro Parliament
- Boundary of Lanao del Sur's 7th parliamentary district in Lanao del Sur
- Province: Lanao del Sur
- Population: 145,641 (2024)
- Electorate: 70,030 (2026)

Current constituency
- Member of Parliament: Rayyan Mindalano (elect)
- Political party: SIAP

Lanao del Sur's 7th parliamentary district is the seventh of the nine parliamentary districts of the province of Lanao del Sur for the Bangsamoro Parliament. It is composed of the municipalities of Bacolod-Kalawi, Balindong, Madalum, Madamba, and Tugaya.

Rayyan Mindalano of the SIAP Party is the member of Parliament-elect for the district following the inaugural 2026 Bangsamoro Parliament election. He will assume office on October 30, 2026.

== List of MPs representing the district ==
| No. | Portrait | Member (Lifespan) | Term of office | Party | Parliament | Electoral history | Constituencies |
|---|---|---|---|---|---|---|---|
| 1 | | Rayyan Mindalano (born 1998) | Assuming office on October 30, 2026 | SIAP | 1st Parliament | Elected in 2026. | 2026–present Bacolod-Kalawi, Balindong, Madalum, Madamba, Tugaya |

== Election results ==
=== 2026 ===
2026 Bangsamoro Parliament election in Lanao del Sur
| Party | Candidate | Votes | % |
|---|---|---|---|
| SIAP | Rayyan Mindalano | 38,670 | 63.63 |
| UBJP | Nora Dipatuan | 21,996 | 36.19 |
| Independent | Palao Sarangani | 74 | 0.12 |
| Independent | Cardawi Macasilang | 31 | 0.05 |
| Total votes | | 60,771 | 100.00 |
| SIAP win (new seat) | | | |
