= Lanao del Sur's 6th parliamentary district =

Parliamentary district for the Bangsamoro Parliament

- Constituency for the Bangsamoro Parliament
- Boundary of Lanao del Sur's 6th parliamentary district in Lanao del Sur
- Province: Lanao del Sur
- Population: 124,834 (2024)
- Electorate: 67,664 (2026)

Current constituency
- Member of Parliament: Hosni Macapodi (elect)
- Political party: SIAP

Lanao del Sur's 6th parliamentary district is the sixth of the nine parliamentary districts of the province of Lanao del Sur for the Bangsamoro Parliament. It is composed of the municipalities of Bayang, Binidayan, Ganassi, Pagayawan, and Pualas.

Hosni Macapodi of the SIAP Party is the member of Parliament-elect for the district following the inaugural 2026 Bangsamoro Parliament election. He will assume office on October 30, 2026.

== List of MPs representing the district ==
No.	Portrait	Member (Lifespan)	Term of office	Party	Parliament	Electoral history	Constituencies
1		Hosni Macapodi (born 1981)	Assuming office on October 30, 2026	SIAP	1st Parliament	Elected in 2026.	2026–present Bayang, Binidayan, Ganassi, Pagayawan, Pualas

== Election results ==
=== 2026 ===
2026 Bangsamoro Parliament election in Lanao del Sur
Party	Candidate	Votes	%
SIAP	Hosni Macapodi	33,983	55.66
UBJP	Jimmy Balt	27,073	44.34
Total votes		61,056	100.00
SIAP win (new seat)			
