= Madalum =

Municipality in Lanao del Sur, Philippines

Madalum مادالم
- Municipality
- Municipality of Madalum
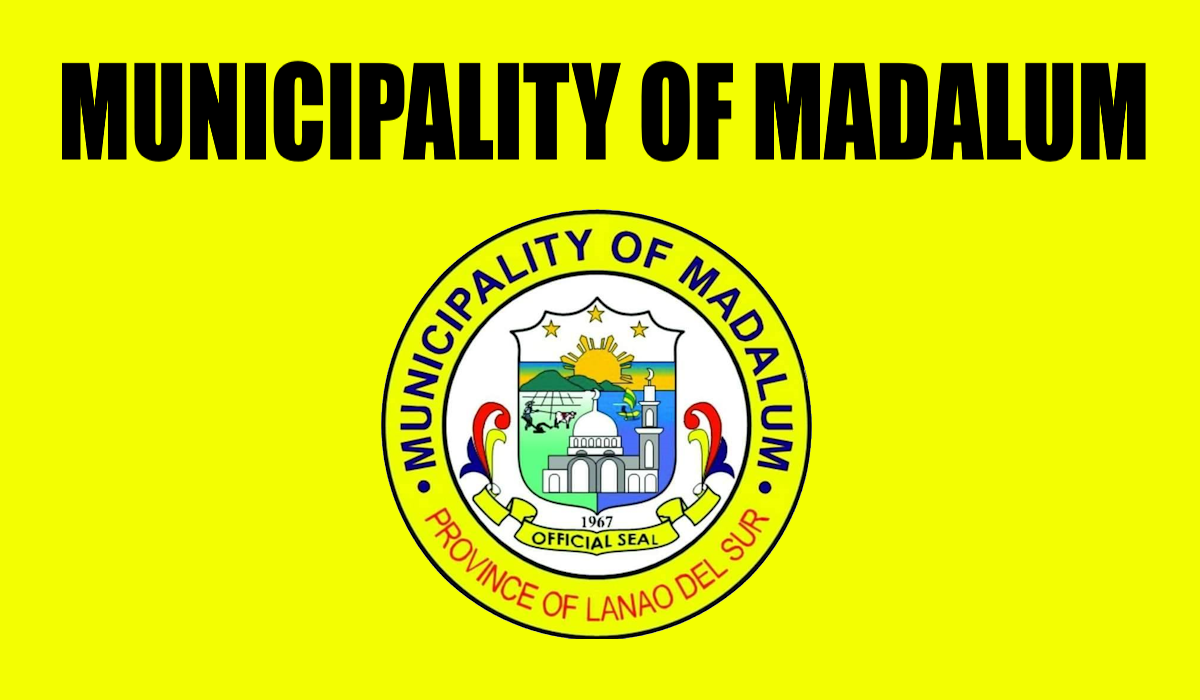
- Flag Seal

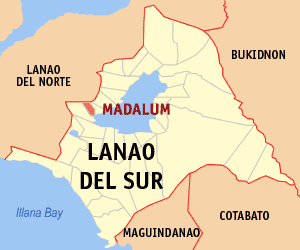
- Map of Lanao del Sur with Madalum highlighted
- Interactive map of Madalum
- Location within the Philippines
- Coordinates: 7°51′11″N 124°07′08″E
- Country: Philippines
- Region: Bangsamoro Autonomous Region in Muslim Mindanao
- Province: Lanao del Sur
- House district: 2nd district
- Parliamentary district: 7th district
- Barangays: 37 (see Barangays)

Government
  - Type: Sangguniang Bayan
  - Mayor: Fathma Hazrat O. Sarangani
  - Vice Mayor: Omeraidah S. Mindalano
  - House Representative: Yasser A. Balindong
  - Municipal Council: Members: Asanie M. Mayon; Noraida T. Abdullah; Omar M. Barabgay Jr.; Aladdin E. Pandapatan; Abdulazis A. Tantao; Mohammad Norjasem C. Hassan; Juhail T. Mangotara; Alvin V. Raniai
  - Electorate: 12,837 voters (2025)

Area
  - Total: 498.39 km^{2} (192.43 sq mi)
- Elevation: 950 m (3,120 ft)
- Highest elevation: 1,801 m (5,909 ft)
- Lowest elevation: 696 m (2,283 ft)

Population (2024 census)
  - Total: 30,044
  - Density: 60.282/km^{2} (156.13/sq mi)
  - Households: 4,211

Economy
  - Income class: 1st municipal income class
  - Poverty incidence: 21.39% (2023)
  - Revenue: ₱ 234.4 million (2024)
  - Assets: ₱ 405.9 million (2024)
  - Expenditure: ₱ 222 million (2024)
  - Liabilities: ₱ 112.2 million (2024)

Service provider
  - Electricity: Lanao del Sur Electric Cooperative (LASURECO)
- Time zone: UTC+8 (PST)
- ZIP code: 9315
- PSGC: 1903613000
- IDD : area code: +63 (0)63
- Native languages: Maranao; Tagalog
- Website: www.madalum-lds.gov.ph

Madalum, officially the Municipality of Madalum (Maranao: Inged a Madalum; Tagalog: Bayan ng Madalum), is a municipality in the province of Lanao del Sur, Philippines. According to the 2024 census, it has a population of 30,044 people.

== History ==
=== As a Municipal District ===
During the second term of Mayor Hadji Usman M. Alawi, President Carlos P. Garcia signed Executive Order No. 409 on December 5, 1960, reclassifying the municipal district of Madalum as a second-class municipal district. The reclassification was based on the municipality’s average annual revenues for the four fiscal years 1956 to 1959 (during his first term), as certified by the General Auditing Office. It took effect as of July 1, 1960.

=== As a Municipality ===
During the third and final term of Mayor Hadji Usman M. Alawi, President Ferdinand E. Marcos signed Executive Order No. 77 on July 18, 1967, officially converting the municipal district of Madalum into a fifth-class municipality. The conversion took effect as of July 1, 1964, after the municipality achieved an average annual revenue of more than four thousand pesos during the four consecutive fiscal years (during his second term) ending June 30, 1964.

This marked the official birth of Madalum as a municipality. The locals celebrate the founding anniversary, known as Araw ng Madalum, every July 18.

== Geography ==
The municipality of Madalum is located in the province of Lanao del Sur, along the periphery of Lake Lanao, the major power source in Mindanao. It is bounded to the north by the municipality of Munai in the province of Lanao del Norte, to the south by Lake Lanao, to the east by the municipality of Bacolod-Kalawi, and to the southwest by the municipality of Madamba.

=== Topography ===
The municipality has varied relief characteristics, ranging from the lowest slopes of the plains to the highest inclines of its mountains. The areas with the lowest slopes consist of irrigable lands, which are currently used for agricultural purposes. In addition to agriculture, these areas are also highly suitable for industrial and other related purposes. The upland areas range from rolling plains to highly mountainous terrain located in the upper portion of the municipality.

Other important topographic features include its rivers, lakes, and streams, such as the Buisan-Linuk River and other existing waterways, which offer potential for irrigation development and other major projects.

=== Barangays ===
Madalum is politically subdivided into 37 barangays. Each barangay consists of puroks while some have sitios.

- Abaga
- Bacayawan
- Bagoaingud
- Basak
- Bato
- Bubong
- Cabasaran
- Cadayonan
- Dandamun
- Delausan
- Diampaca
- Dibarosan
- Gadongan
- Gurain
- Kormatan
- Liangan
- Liangan I
- Lilitun
- Linao
- Linuk
- Lumbac
- Madaya
- Padian Torogan I
- Pagayawan
- Paridi-Kalimodan
- Poblacion
- Punud
- Racotan
- Raya
- Riray
- Sabanding
- Salongabanding
- Sogod Kaloy
- Sugod
- Tamporong
- Tongantongan
- Udangun

=== Climate ===
Climate data for Madalum, Lanao de Sur
Month	Jan	Feb	Mar	Apr	May	Jun	Jul	Aug	Sep	Oct	Nov	Dec	Year
Mean daily maximum °C (°F)	24 (75)	24 (75)	25 (77)	26 (79)	26 (79)	25 (77)	25 (77)	25 (77)	25 (77)	25 (77)	25 (77)	25 (77)	25 (77)
Mean daily minimum °C (°F)	20 (68)	20 (68)	20 (68)	20 (68)	21 (70)	21 (70)	20 (68)	20 (68)	20 (68)	20 (68)	20 (68)	20 (68)	20 (68)
Average precipitation mm (inches)	159 (6.3)	143 (5.6)	166 (6.5)	183 (7.2)	357 (14.1)	414 (16.3)	333 (13.1)	309 (12.2)	289 (11.4)	285 (11.2)	253 (10.0)	166 (6.5)	3,057 (120.4)
Average rainy days	18.4	17.2	20.6	23.4	29.3	29.2	29.9	29.4	27.7	28.7	25.5	19.9	299.2
Source: Meteoblue (modeled/calculated data, not measured locally)

== Demographics ==
Population census of Madalum
Year	Pop.	±% p.a.
1918	1,606	—
1939	3,173	+3.30%
1948	4,699	+4.46%
1960	6,523	+2.77%
1970	7,937	+1.98%
1975	10,005	+4.75%
1980	8,912	−2.29%
1990	14,747	+5.17%
1995	15,838	+1.35%
2000	18,405	+3.27%
2007	25,585	+4.65%
2010	20,243	−8.17%
2015	23,127	+2.57%
2020	26,478	+2.89%
2024	30,044	+3.08%
Source: Philippine Statistics Authority

== Economy ==
Poverty Incidence of Madalum

Source: Philippine Statistics Authority

Data on major establishments in the municipality of Madalum indicate the predominance of wholesale and retail trade, small businesses, community and social services, and personal services.

As an agricultural municipality with a predominantly rural population, a large portion of the working population is engaged in farming and fishing, as well as employment in government or private institutions.

The soil resources in the area consist of silt and loam, which are well-suited for agricultural production. The primary agricultural product is rice. Other major crops produced in the municipality include corn, coconut, vegetables, root crops, bananas, plantation crops, fruit crops, and many others.

== Government ==
=== List of Municipal District Presidents ===
- Hadji Pagala Alapa (Appointed)
- Hadji Basar Datusa Masiu (Appointed)
- Macabada Angni (Appointed)
- Macrang Angni (Appointed)
- Hadji Latip Alawi Macarimbang (Appointed)
- Datu Mangontra Alawi Macarimbang (Appointed)
- Hadji Usman Macarimbang Alawi (Appointed)

=== List of Mayors ===
- 1955–1960, Hadji Usman Macarimbang Alawi (First appointed mayor)
- 1960–1964, Hadji Usman Macarimbang Alawi (First elected mayor)
- 1964–1968, Hadji Usman Macarimbang Alawi
- 1968–1972, Hadji Yasin A. Bazar
- 1972–1978, Hadji Abolais Raquib Omar
- 1978–1979, Macapando Angni (Appointed)
- 1979–1980, Hadji Yasin A. Bazar (Appointed)
- 1980–1986, Hadji Abolais Raquib Omar
- 1986–1987, Usman T. Sarangani Sr. (Appointed)
- 1987, Saidale M. Cali (OIC)
- 1987–1988, Usman T. Sarangani Sr. (Appointed)
- 1988–1992, Usman T. Sarangani Sr.
- 1992–1995, Usman T. Sarangani Sr.
- 1995–1998, Usman T. Sarangani Sr.
- 1998–2001, Soraida M. Sarangani
- 2001–2004, Soraida M. Sarangani
- 2004–2007, Soraida M. Sarangani
- 2007–2010, Usman M. Sarangani Jr.
- 2010–2013, Usman M. Sarangani Jr.
- 2013–2016, Usman M. Sarangani Jr.
- 2016–2019, Soraida M. Sarangani
- 2019–2022, Omeraidah S. Mindalano
- 2022–2025, Usman M. Sarangani Jr.
- 2025–present, Fathma Hazrat Macarimbang Omar Sarangani

== Infrastructure ==
The municipality's existing infrastructure consists of government buildings, roads, bridges, and water resources. The most common government buildings are elementary schools and health centers, which are located in some of the barangays.

Jeepneys, tricycles, boats, and other modes of transportation serve as the primary means of moving goods and people to and from the area.

== Education ==
All levels of education are available in Madalum. The municipality has three major high schools: Madalum National High School, Datu Raquib Zainodin National High School, and Ranaw Islamic Institute of Technology (RIIT). RIIT also offers college courses and is the first higher education institution in the municipality.
