= Lanao del Sur's 2nd congressional district =

Legislative district of the Philippines

- Constituency for the House of Representatives of the Philippines
- Location of Lanao del Sur within the Philippines
- Province: Lanao del Sur
- Region: Bangsamoro
- Population: 435,850 (2015)
- Electorate: 238,863 (2019)
- Major settlements: 22 LGUs: Municipalities; Bacolod-Kalawi; Balabagan; Balindong; Bayang; Binidayan; Butig; Calanogas; Ganassi; Kapatagan; Lumbaca-Unayan; Lumbatan; Lumbayanague; Madalum; Madamba; Malabang; Marogong; Pagayawan; Picong; Pualas; Sultan Dumalondong; Tubaran; Tugaya
- Area: 6,092.26 km^{2} (2,352.23 sq mi)

Current constituency
- Created: 1987
- Representative: Yasser A. Balindong
- Political party: Lakas; SIAP
- Congressional bloc: Majority

Lanao del Sur's 2nd congressional district is a congressional district in the province of Lanao del Sur that has been represented in the House of Representatives of the Philippines since 1987. It covers 22 municipalities bordering the southern shores of Lake Lanao, including those located on the Moro Gulf coast and the municipalities bordering Maguindanao del Norte. The district is currently represented in the 20th Congress by Yasser Balindong of the Lakas–CMD (Lakas) and Serbisyong Inklusibo–Alyansang Progresibo (SIAP).

== Representation history ==
#	Image	Member	Term of office		Congress	Party	Electoral history	Constituent LGUs
#	Image	Member	Start	End	Congress	Party	Electoral history	Constituent LGUs
=== Lanao del Sur's 2nd district for the House of Representatives of the Philippines ===
District created February 2, 1987 from Lanao del Sur's at-large district.
1		Mohammad Ali B. Dimaporo	June 30, 1987	June 30, 1995	8th	GAD	Elected in 1987.	1987–1995; Bacolod Grande, Balabagan, Balindong, Bayang, Binidayan, Butig, Calanogas, Ganassi, Kapatagan, Lumbatan, Lumbayanague, Madalum, Madamba, Malabang, Marogong, Pagayawan, Pualas, Sultan Gumander, Tubaran, Tugaya
1		Mohammad Ali B. Dimaporo	June 30, 1987	June 30, 1995	9th	Nacionalista	Re-elected in 1992.	1987–1995; Bacolod Grande, Balabagan, Balindong, Bayang, Binidayan, Butig, Calanogas, Ganassi, Kapatagan, Lumbatan, Lumbayanague, Madalum, Madamba, Malabang, Marogong, Pagayawan, Pualas, Sultan Gumander, Tubaran, Tugaya
2		Pangalian Balindong	June 30, 1995	June 30, 1998	10th	Lakas	Elected in 1995.	1995–2007; Bacolod-Kalawi, Balabagan, Balindong, Bayang, Binidayan, Butig, Calanogas, Ganassi, Kapatagan, Lumbatan, Lumbayanague, Madalum, Madamba, Malabang, Marogong, Pagayawan, Pualas, Sultan Dumalondong, Sultan Gumander, Tubaran, Tugaya
3		Benasing O. Macarambon Jr.	June 30, 1998	June 30, 2007	11th	NPC	Elected in 1998.	1995–2007; Bacolod-Kalawi, Balabagan, Balindong, Bayang, Binidayan, Butig, Calanogas, Ganassi, Kapatagan, Lumbatan, Lumbayanague, Madalum, Madamba, Malabang, Marogong, Pagayawan, Pualas, Sultan Dumalondong, Sultan Gumander, Tubaran, Tugaya
3		Benasing O. Macarambon Jr.	June 30, 1998	June 30, 2007	12th	NPC	Re-elected in 2001.	1995–2007; Bacolod-Kalawi, Balabagan, Balindong, Bayang, Binidayan, Butig, Calanogas, Ganassi, Kapatagan, Lumbatan, Lumbayanague, Madalum, Madamba, Malabang, Marogong, Pagayawan, Pualas, Sultan Dumalondong, Sultan Gumander, Tubaran, Tugaya
3		Benasing O. Macarambon Jr.	June 30, 1998	June 30, 2007	13th	NPC	Re-elected in 2004.	1995–2007; Bacolod-Kalawi, Balabagan, Balindong, Bayang, Binidayan, Butig, Calanogas, Ganassi, Kapatagan, Lumbatan, Lumbayanague, Madalum, Madamba, Malabang, Marogong, Pagayawan, Pualas, Sultan Dumalondong, Sultan Gumander, Tubaran, Tugaya
(2)		Pangalian Balindong	June 30, 2007	June 30, 2016	14th	Lakas	Elected in 2007.	2007–present Bacolod-Kalawi, Balabagan, Balindong, Bayang, Binidayan, Butig, Calanogas, Ganassi, Kapatagan, Lumbaca-Unayan, Lumbatan, Lumbayanague, Madalum, Madamba, Malabang, Marogong, Pagayawan, Picong, Pualas, Sultan Dumalondong, Tubaran, Tugaya
(2)		Pangalian Balindong	June 30, 2007	June 30, 2016	15th	Liberal	Re-elected in 2010.	2007–present Bacolod-Kalawi, Balabagan, Balindong, Bayang, Binidayan, Butig, Calanogas, Ganassi, Kapatagan, Lumbaca-Unayan, Lumbatan, Lumbayanague, Madalum, Madamba, Malabang, Marogong, Pagayawan, Picong, Pualas, Sultan Dumalondong, Tubaran, Tugaya
(2)		Pangalian Balindong	June 30, 2007	June 30, 2016	16th	Liberal	Re-elected in 2013.	2007–present Bacolod-Kalawi, Balabagan, Balindong, Bayang, Binidayan, Butig, Calanogas, Ganassi, Kapatagan, Lumbaca-Unayan, Lumbatan, Lumbayanague, Madalum, Madamba, Malabang, Marogong, Pagayawan, Picong, Pualas, Sultan Dumalondong, Tubaran, Tugaya
4		Mauyag Papandayan Jr.	June 30, 2016	June 30, 2019	17th	PDP–Laban	Elected in 2016.	2007–present Bacolod-Kalawi, Balabagan, Balindong, Bayang, Binidayan, Butig, Calanogas, Ganassi, Kapatagan, Lumbaca-Unayan, Lumbatan, Lumbayanague, Madalum, Madamba, Malabang, Marogong, Pagayawan, Picong, Pualas, Sultan Dumalondong, Tubaran, Tugaya
5		Yasser A. Balindong	June 30, 2019	Incumbent	18th	Lakas (SIAP)	Elected in 2019.	2007–present Bacolod-Kalawi, Balabagan, Balindong, Bayang, Binidayan, Butig, Calanogas, Ganassi, Kapatagan, Lumbaca-Unayan, Lumbatan, Lumbayanague, Madalum, Madamba, Malabang, Marogong, Pagayawan, Picong, Pualas, Sultan Dumalondong, Tubaran, Tugaya
5		Yasser A. Balindong	June 30, 2019	Incumbent	19th	Lakas (SIAP)	Re-elected in 2022.	2007–present Bacolod-Kalawi, Balabagan, Balindong, Bayang, Binidayan, Butig, Calanogas, Ganassi, Kapatagan, Lumbaca-Unayan, Lumbatan, Lumbayanague, Madalum, Madamba, Malabang, Marogong, Pagayawan, Picong, Pualas, Sultan Dumalondong, Tubaran, Tugaya
5		Yasser A. Balindong	June 30, 2019	Incumbent	20th	Lakas (SIAP)	Re-elected in 2025.	2007–present Bacolod-Kalawi, Balabagan, Balindong, Bayang, Binidayan, Butig, Calanogas, Ganassi, Kapatagan, Lumbaca-Unayan, Lumbatan, Lumbayanague, Madalum, Madamba, Malabang, Marogong, Pagayawan, Picong, Pualas, Sultan Dumalondong, Tubaran, Tugaya

== Election results ==
=== 2025 ===
Candidate	Party	Votes	%
Yasser Balindong (incumbent)	Lakas–CMD	174,310	80.20
Rehan Lao	United Bangsamoro Justice Party	43,025	19.80
Total		217,335	100.00
Valid votes		217,335	89.03
Invalid/blank votes		26,775	10.97
Total votes		244,110	100.00
Registered voters/turnout		303,088	80.54
Lakas–CMD hold			
Source: Commission on Elections

=== 2022 ===
Candidate	Party	Votes	%
Yasser Balindong (incumbent)	Lakas–CMD	111,704	56.19
Froxy Macarambon	Aksyon Demokratiko	83,954	42.23
Sagusara Andong	Independent	2,494	1.25
Abolkhair Maca-ayan	Reform Party	660	0.33
Total		198,812	100.00
Total votes		232,634	–
Registered voters/turnout		295,587	78.70
Lakas–CMD hold			
Source: Commission on Elections

=== 2016 ===
2016 Philippine House of Representatives elections
Party	Candidate	Votes	%
PBM	Rommel Alonto		
Liberal	Yasser Balindong		
NPC	Mohammad Hafez Marohom		
PDP–Laban	Mauyag Balt Papandayan Jr.		
Total votes			

=== 2013 ===
2013 Philippine House of Representatives elections
Party	Candidate	Votes	%	±%
Liberal	Pangalian Balindong			
Independent	Bolkisah Bantuas			
Ompia	Salih Abdul Benito			
PDP–Laban	Benasing Macarambon			
Margin of victory				
Rejected ballots				
Turnout				
Liberal hold		Swing		

=== 2010 ===
Candidate	Party	Votes	%
Pangalian Balindong (incumbent)	Lakas–Kampi–CMD	67,621	60.44
Benasing Macarambon	Nacionalista Party		
Carding Alonto	PDP–Laban		
Hajiakbar Lucman	Pwersa ng Masang Pilipino		
Total			
Lakas–Kampi–CMD hold			

== See also ==
- Legislative districts of Lanao del Sur
