= Binidayan =

Municipality in Lanao del Sur, Philippines

Binidayan بينيدايان
- Municipality
- Municipality of Binidayan
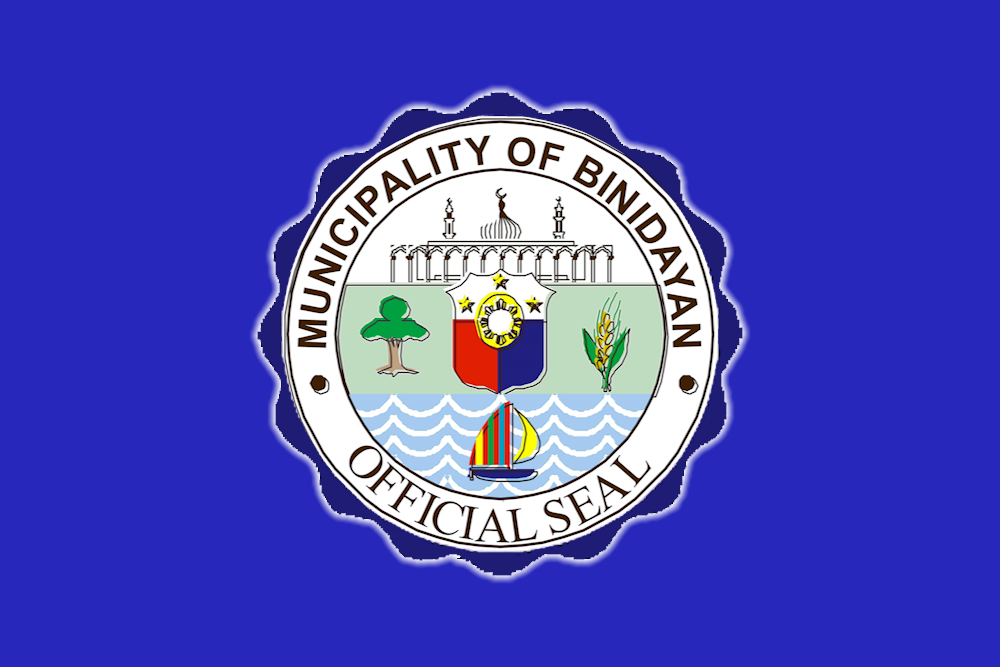
- Flag Seal

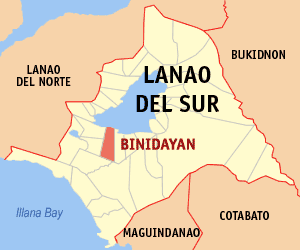
- Map of Lanao del Sur with Binidayan highlighted
- Interactive map of Binidayan
- Location within the Philippines
- Coordinates: 7°47′51″N 124°09′53″E
- Country: Philippines
- Region: Bangsamoro Autonomous Region in Muslim Mindanao
- Province: Lanao del Sur
- House district: 2nd district
- Parliamentary district: 6th district
- Founded: 1954
- Barangays: 26 (see Barangays)

Government
  - Type: Sangguniang Bayan
  - Mayor: Sodais "Sual" Daromoyod Dimaporo (Lakas–CMD)
  - Vice Mayor: Punudaranao "Panny" Benito Datumulok (Lakas–CMD)
  - House Representative: Yasser Alonto Balindong (Lakas–CMD)
  - Councilors: Abdul Jabar Dimalen Dimalna; Mohammad Cosary Benito Datumulok; Alinair Zaman Abdul Gani; Aliosop Ramos Mulok; Patah Mastura Olama; Khalid Mangotara Nasrodin; Alibsar Murad Ali; Jamal Dikunugun Ali
  - Electorate: 11,170 voters (2025)

Area
  - Total: 280.00 km^{2} (108.11 sq mi)
- Elevation: 805 m (2,641 ft)
- Highest elevation: 1,116 m (3,661 ft)
- Lowest elevation: 696 m (2,283 ft)

Population (2024 census)
  - Total: 27,031
  - Density: 96.539/km^{2} (250.04/sq mi)
  - Households: 4,064

Economy
  - Income class: 3rd municipal income class
  - Poverty incidence: 21.94% (2023)
  - Revenue: ₱ 156.6 million (2024)
  - Assets: ₱ 292.8 million (2024)
  - Expenditure: ₱ 106.9 million (2024)
  - Liabilities: ₱ 1.895 million (2022, 2023, 2024)

Service provider
  - Electricity: Lanao del Sur Electric Cooperative (LASURECO)
- Time zone: UTC+8 (PST)
- ZIP code: 9310
- PSGC: 1903605000
- IDD : area code: +63 (0)63
- Native languages: Maranao; Tagalog
- Major religions: Islam

Binidayan, officially the Municipality of Binidayan (Maranao and Iranun: Inged a Binidayan; Tagalog: Bayan ng Binidayan), is a municipality in the province of Lanao del Sur, Philippines. According to the 2024 census, it has a population of 27,031 people.

== Etymology ==
The name "Binidayan" derives from the term Bindayan, which means "ready to cultivate".

== History ==
The municipality of Binidayan was created by virtue of Presidential Decree No. 482 series of 1954. Its first local election was held on the 1957 Philippine General Election, hence numerous individuals were appointed as its local officials prior to the 1957 Philippine General Election.

Sultan Raraco Pundag Macaorao was the municipality's first mayor by virtue of appointment. Datu Omar Basman Olama was its first elected municipal mayor, while Sultan Muliloda Dimaporo was the municipality's longest serving chief executive.

After the 1986 People Power Revolution which resulted to the ascension of President Cory Aquino, all incumbent local officials were removed from their respective offices to pave way to President Aquino's reform agenda. As a result, numerous individuals were named as the municipality's officials prior to the 1988 General election.

== Geography ==
=== Barangays ===
Binidayan is politically subdivided into 26 barangays. Each barangay consists of puroks while some have sitios.

- Badak
- Baguiangun
- Balut Maito
- Basak
- Bubong Cabasaran
- Bubonga-Ranao
- Dansalan Dacsula
- Ingud
- Kialilidan
- Lumbac
- Macaguiling
- Madaya
- Magonaya
- Maindig
- Masolun
- Olama
- Pagalamatan
- Pantar
- Picalilangan
- Picotaan
- Pindolonan
- Poblacion
- Soldaroro
- Tambac
- Timbangan
- Tuca

=== Climate ===
Climate data for Binidayan, Lanao de Sur
Month	Jan	Feb	Mar	Apr	May	Jun	Jul	Aug	Sep	Oct	Nov	Dec	Year
Mean daily maximum °C (°F)	26 (79)	26 (79)	26 (79)	27 (81)	26 (79)	25 (77)	25 (77)	25 (77)	25 (77)	25 (77)	25 (77)	26 (79)	26 (78)
Mean daily minimum °C (°F)	20 (68)	20 (68)	20 (68)	21 (70)	21 (70)	21 (70)	20 (68)	20 (68)	20 (68)	20 (68)	21 (70)	20 (68)	20 (69)
Average precipitation mm (inches)	236 (9.3)	225 (8.9)	244 (9.6)	235 (9.3)	304 (12.0)	287 (11.3)	200 (7.9)	175 (6.9)	158 (6.2)	200 (7.9)	287 (11.3)	243 (9.6)	2,794 (110.2)
Average rainy days	24.3	22.3	26.0	27.2	28.3	27.2	25.8	24.8	22.2	25.4	27.2	25.8	306.5
Source: Meteoblue (modeled/calculated data, not measured locally)

== Demographics ==
Population census of Binidayan
Year	Pop.	±% p.a.
1918	880	—
1939	2,954	+5.94%
1948	6,533	+9.22%
1960	13,881	+6.48%
1970	14,542	+0.47%
1975	13,875	−0.94%
1980	11,680	−3.38%
1990	15,211	+2.68%
1995	16,157	+1.14%
2000	18,081	+2.44%
2007	21,569	+2.46%
2010	19,493	−3.62%
2015	22,079	+2.40%
2020	25,965	+3.47%
2024	27,031	+0.97%
Source: Philippine Statistics Authority

== Economy ==
Poverty Incidence of Binidayan

Source: Philippine Statistics Authority

== Government ==
=== Appointed Municipal Mayors ===
- Sultan Raraco Pundag Macaorao (Upon the creation of the municipality on 1954)
- Macapia Tarawi (Prior to 1957 Philippine presidential election)
- Sultan Abdulmadid "Panondi" Maruhom (Prior to 1957 Philippine presidential election)
- Hadji Usman Lomondag Olama (Prior to 1957 Philippine presidential election)
- Ismael "Mike" Malangas (Provisional Government of the Philippines (1986–1987))
- Zainoden Domaot (Provisional Government of the Philippines (1986–1987))
- Hassim Olama (Provisional Government of the Philippines (1986–1987))
- Maguidala Datumulok Dimaporo (Provisional Government of the Philippines (1986–1987))

=== Elected Municipal Mayors ===
- Omar "Basman" Olama (1957–1961)
- Sultan Muliloda Datumulok Dimaporo (1961–1986; 1988–1995)
- Punudaranao Benito Datumulok (1995–2001)
- Aman Misbac Ampuan Datumulok (2001–2010)
- Abdullah Dimaporo Datumulok (2010–2019)
- Sodais Daromoyod Dimaporo (2019–2028)

== Education ==
Secondary

- Mindanao State University – Binidayan Community High School
- Ampaso Memorial National High School
- Sittie Ayeesha National High School

== Healthcare ==
Binidayan is being served by the Unayan District Hospital, a community hospital located in Barangay Pagalamatan.
