= Ganassi, Lanao del Sur =

Municipality in Lanao del Sur, Philippines

Ganassi غاناسي
- Municipality
- Municipality of Ganassi
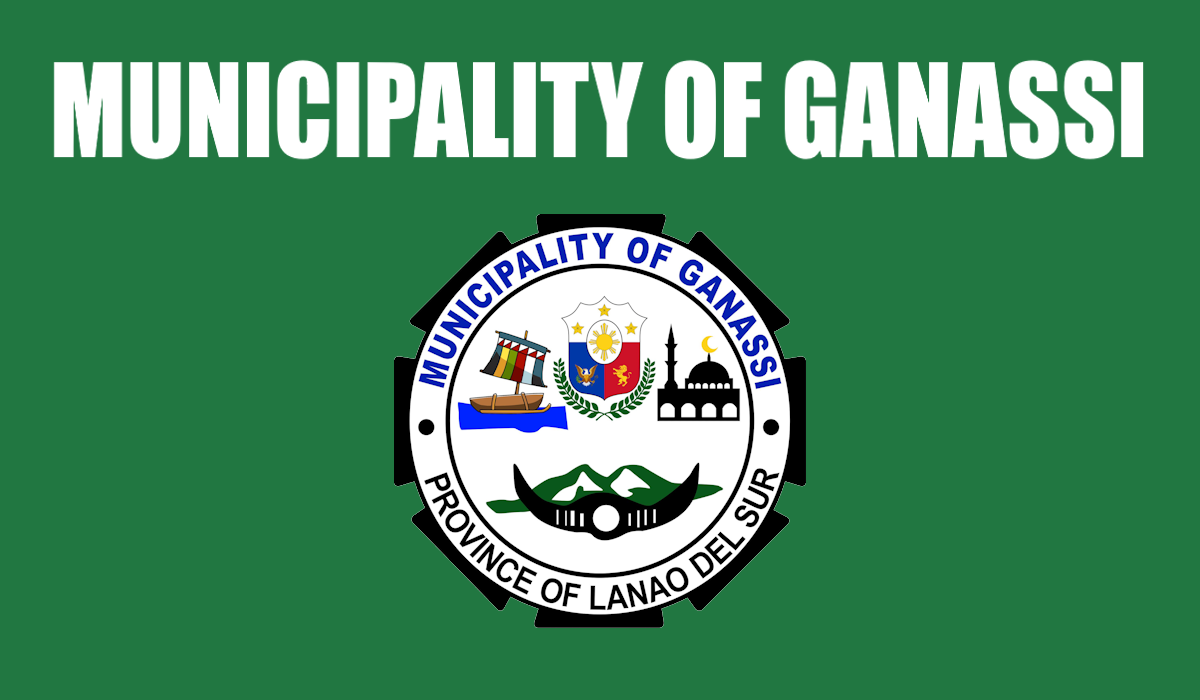
- Flag Seal

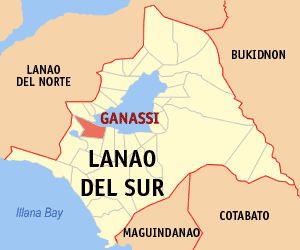
- Map of Lanao del Sur with Ganassi highlighted
- Interactive map of Ganassi
- Location within the Philippines
- Coordinates: 7°49′37″N 124°06′12″E
- Country: Philippines
- Region: Bangsamoro Autonomous Region in Muslim Mindanao
- Province: Lanao del Sur
- House district: 2nd district
- Parliamentary district: 6th district
- Barangays: 32 (see Barangays)

Government
  - Type: Sangguniang Bayan
  - Mayor: Hosni B. Macapodi
  - Vice Mayor: Anida Sharina M. Lucman
  - House Representative: Yasser A. Balindong
  - Municipal Council: Members: Mohammad Noah M. Macapodi; Saipoden A. Amerol; Sadam M. Macapodi; Hashim M. Mangondaya; Aliola M. Paramata; Jalilah H. Ali-Macapodi; Nassif B. Macalipot; Aliola M. Paramata
  - Electorate: 11,477 voters (2025)

Area
  - Total: 256.00 km^{2} (98.84 sq mi)
- Elevation: 890 m (2,920 ft)
- Highest elevation: 1,390 m (4,560 ft)
- Lowest elevation: 696 m (2,283 ft)

Population (2024 census)
  - Total: 33,897
  - Density: 132.41/km^{2} (342.94/sq mi)
  - Households: 4,781

Economy
  - Income class: 2nd municipal income class
  - Poverty incidence: 16.98% (2023)
  - Revenue: ₱ 187.8 million (2023, 2024)
  - Assets: ₱ 283.3 million (2023, 2024)
  - Expenditure: ₱ 163.5 million (2024)
  - Liabilities: ₱ 73.48 million (2023, 2024)

Service provider
  - Electricity: Lanao del Sur Electric Cooperative (LASURECO)
- Time zone: UTC+8 (PST)
- ZIP code: 9311
- PSGC: 1903609000
- IDD : area code: +63 (0)63
- Native languages: Maranao; Tagalog
- Major religions: Islam
- Website: www.ganassi-lds.gov.ph

Ganassi, officially the Municipality of Ganassi (Maranao: Inged a Ganassi; Tagalog: Bayan ng Ganassi), is a municipality in the province of Lanao del Sur, Philippines. According to the 2024 census, it has a population of 33,897 people.

The municipality used to host the 'finest example of a traditional torogan' according to Jesus T. Peralta of the National Commission for Culture and the Arts. In January 2016, a media team found that the Laguindab torogan still stands in Ganassi, though it is badly damaged. A conservation effort is needed to rehabilitate the Laguindab torogan, one of the most outstanding royal houses built in the entire Philippines.

== History ==
The name "Ganassi" came from one of the Nine Princess of Unayan (e.g. in Meranau term Imoda sa ganassi Ayour so Linindingan, Andong so Macadar, etc.).

Before American colonization, Ganassi was formerly a part of the State of Unayan, Confederate States of Lanao based from ancient boundaries.

On the evening of November 11, 1963, a day before the election, police chief Empi Marohon was killed by an assailant while a laborer was injured. Representative Rashid Lucman proposed postponing the election in Ganassi due to Marohon's murder, but his request was denied by COMELEC chairman Juan V. Borra.

== Geography ==
=== Barangays ===
Ganassi is politically subdivided into 32 barangays. Each barangay consists of puroks while some have sitios.

- Bagoaingud
- Balintad
- Balintad A
- Barit
- Barorao
- Bato Batoray
- Baya
- Campong a Raya
- Campong Sabela
- Dapaan
- Gadongan
- Gui
- Linuk
- Lumbac
- Lumbacaingud
- Macabao
- Macaguiling
- Masolun
- Pagalongan
- Pamalian
- Pangadapan
- Panggawalupa
- Pantaon
- Pantaon A
- Para-aba
- Pindulonan
- Poblacion
- Sekun Matampay
- Sogod Madaya
- Tabuan
- Taganonok
- Taliogon

=== Climate ===
Climate data for Ganassi, Lanao del Sur
Month	Jan	Feb	Mar	Apr	May	Jun	Jul	Aug	Sep	Oct	Nov	Dec	Year
Mean daily maximum °C (°F)	26 (79)	26 (79)	26 (79)	27 (81)	26 (79)	25 (77)	25 (77)	25 (77)	25 (77)	25 (77)	25 (77)	26 (79)	26 (78)
Mean daily minimum °C (°F)	20 (68)	20 (68)	20 (68)	21 (70)	21 (70)	21 (70)	20 (68)	20 (68)	20 (68)	20 (68)	21 (70)	20 (68)	20 (69)
Average precipitation mm (inches)	236 (9.3)	225 (8.9)	244 (9.6)	235 (9.3)	304 (12.0)	287 (11.3)	200 (7.9)	175 (6.9)	158 (6.2)	200 (7.9)	287 (11.3)	243 (9.6)	2,794 (110.2)
Average rainy days	24.3	22.3	26.0	27.2	28.3	27.2	25.8	24.8	22.2	25.4	27.2	25.8	306.5
Source: Meteoblue (modeled/calculated data, not measured locally)

== Demographics ==
Population census of Ganassi
Year	Pop.	±% p.a.
1918	1,943	—
1939	3,892	+3.36%
1948	9,573	+10.52%
1960	12,372	+2.16%
1970	13,227	+0.67%
1975	15,506	+3.24%
1980	9,755	−8.85%
1990	15,394	+4.67%
1995	16,947	+1.82%
2000	18,947	+2.42%
2007	25,456	+4.16%
2010	20,205	−8.06%
2015	23,016	+2.51%
2020	30,802	+6.33%
2024	33,897	+2.33%
Source: Philippine Statistics Authority

== Economy ==
Poverty Incidence of Ganassi

Source: Philippine Statistics Authority

== Culture ==
=== Torogan Finesse ===
It was reported in 2015 that the town once hosted what used to be the finest example of a torogan, a huge traditional Maranao house which was the seat of power of the Maranao royalties and Maranao high officials. Unfortunately, for an undisclosed reason, the torogan was demolished by some locals. A group once campaigned for the passage of an ordinance where the architecture of all houses and buildings in Ganassi will follow the okir and the torogan style. Through it, the town would have been the first planned city whose architectural grandeur is inspired by a traditional Maranao vernacular way of building. However, due to lack of funding available, the campaign went into deaf ears.

In January 2016, the media team went to the municipality and found half of the former Laguindab Torogan of Ganassi still intact and badly needs restoration. Once restored, according to the National Commission for Culture and the Arts, the Laguindab Torogan can be declared as a National Cultural Treasure like the Kawayan torogan of Marantao. A group of people are planning to nominate the torogans of Lanao del Sur to the UNESCO World Heritage List, but the nomination is being halted as of the moment due to the lack of restoration in some torogans in the area, specifically in Ganassi. The possible nomination of the Laguindab torogan to the National Cultural Treasure list and the UNESCO list is seen to boost the tourism of the area, if the torogan is conserved properly and evaluated by the local government of Ganassi, with aid request from the National Museum or National Commission for Culture and the Arts.
