= Pualas =

Municipality in Lanao del Sur, Philippines

Pualas بووالاس
- Municipality
- Municipality of Pualas
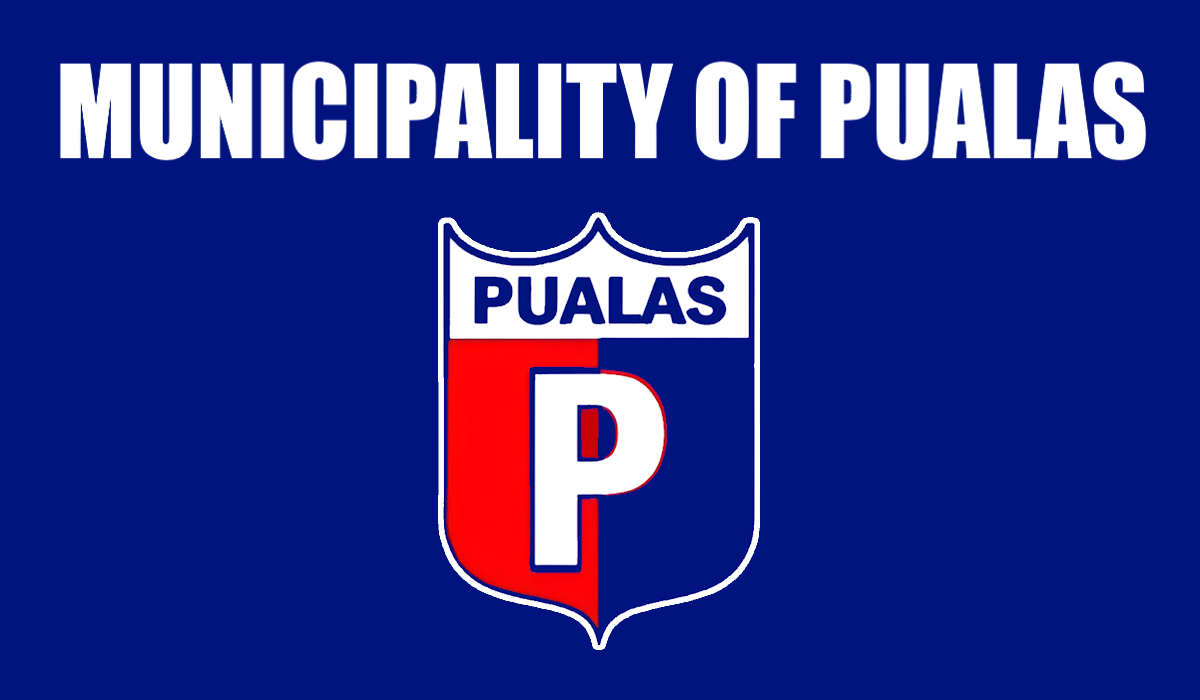
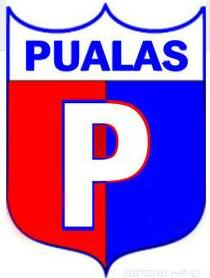
- Flag Seal

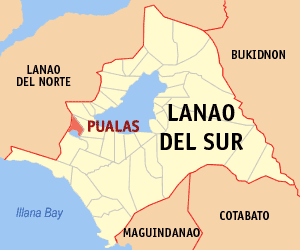
- Map of Lanao del Sur with Pualas highlighted
- Interactive map of Pualas
- Location within the Philippines
- Coordinates: 7°49′16″N 124°04′46″E
- Country: Philippines
- Region: Bangsamoro Autonomous Region in Muslim Mindanao
- Province: Lanao del Sur
- House district: 2nd district
- Parliamentary district: 6th district
- Barangays: 23 (see Barangays)

Government
  - Type: Sangguniang Bayan
  - Mayor: Al-Ihsan “Mama” M. Ibrahim
  - Vice Mayor: Dialalodin L. Maruhom
  - House Representative: Yasser A. Balindong
  - Municipal Council: Members: Noraimah S. Lanto; Sharieffudin T. Lucman; Asraf S. Asinda; Khalid D. Mutin; Nurhan T. Sarip; Hosnie D. Saripada; Samrodin T. Maruhom; Mohammed S. Tanog
  - Electorate: 13,630 voters (2025)

Area
  - Total: 182.89 km^{2} (70.61 sq mi)
- Elevation: 937 m (3,074 ft)
- Highest elevation: 1,443 m (4,734 ft)
- Lowest elevation: 696 m (2,283 ft)

Population (2024 census)
  - Total: 18,020
  - Density: 98.53/km^{2} (255.2/sq mi)
  - Households: 2,498

Economy
  - Income class: 3rd municipal income class
  - Poverty incidence: 20.4% (2023)
  - Revenue: ₱ 14.34 million (2024)
  - Assets: ₱ 165 million (2024)
  - Expenditure: ₱ 132.8 million (2024)
  - Liabilities: ₱ 55.73 million (2024)

Service provider
  - Electricity: Lanao del Sur Electric Cooperative (LASURECO)
- Time zone: UTC+8 (PST)
- ZIP code: 9313
- PSGC: 1903623000
- IDD : area code: +63 (0)63
- Native languages: Maranao; Tagalog

Pualas, officially the Municipality of Pualas (Maranao: Inged a Pualas; Tagalog: Bayan ng Pualas), is a municipality in the province of Lanao del Sur, Philippines. According to the 2024 census, it has a population of 18,020 people.

== History ==
On June 21, 1953, by the virtue of Executive Order No. 1516 Pualas was created with 39 barangay. By December 14, 1985, by the issuance of executive order no. 108 Only 23 were retained.

== Geography ==
=== Barangays ===
Pualas is politically subdivided into 23 barangays. Each barangay consists of puroks while some have sitios.

- Badak
- Bantayan
- Basagad
- Bolinsong
- Boring
- Bualan
- Danugan
- Dapao
- Diamla
- Gadongan
- Ingud
- Linuk
- Lumbac
- Maligo
- Masao
- Notong
- Porug
- Romagondong
- Talambo (Poblacion)
- Tamlang
- Tomarompong
- Tuka
- Yaran

=== Climate ===
Climate data for Pualas, Lanao del Sur
Month	Jan	Feb	Mar	Apr	May	Jun	Jul	Aug	Sep	Oct	Nov	Dec	Year
Mean daily maximum °C (°F)	25 (77)	25 (77)	25 (77)	26 (79)	25 (77)	24 (75)	24 (75)	24 (75)	24 (75)	24 (75)	24 (75)	25 (77)	25 (76)
Mean daily minimum °C (°F)	19 (66)	19 (66)	19 (66)	20 (68)	20 (68)	20 (68)	19 (66)	19 (66)	19 (66)	20 (68)	20 (68)	19 (66)	19 (67)
Average precipitation mm (inches)	236 (9.3)	225 (8.9)	244 (9.6)	235 (9.3)	304 (12.0)	287 (11.3)	200 (7.9)	175 (6.9)	158 (6.2)	200 (7.9)	287 (11.3)	243 (9.6)	2,794 (110.2)
Average rainy days	24.3	22.3	26.0	27.2	28.3	27.2	25.8	24.8	22.2	25.4	27.2	25.8	306.5
Source: Meteoblue (modeled/calculated data, not measured locally)

== Demographics ==
Population census of Pualas
Year	Pop.	±% p.a.
1918	3,307	—
1939	4,708	+1.70%
1948	6,704	+4.01%
1960	8,242	+1.74%
1970	7,705	−0.67%
1975	11,776	+8.88%
1980	6,284	−11.80%
1990	7,177	+1.34%
1995	8,259	+2.67%
2000	7,887	−0.98%
2007	17,962	+12.02%
2010	11,163	−15.89%
2015	12,866	+2.74%
2020	14,526	+2.59%
2024	18,020	+5.31%
Source: Philippine Statistics Authority

=== Language ===
Maranao is the native language of Pualas. However, most of the inhabitants can speak Filipino, Cebuana, and English.

=== Religion ===
Pualas, which has a predominantly Muslim population.

== Economy ==
Poverty Incidence of Pualas

Source: Philippine Statistics Authority

== Local Government ==
Pualas is governed primarily by the mayor, the vice mayor and the SB Members

== Culture ==
Pualas has a predominantly Muslim populace wherein selling and distribution of alcoholic drinks, illegal drugs, and gambling is forbidden.

== Education ==
Pualas National High School is a public High School Located at Barangay Talambo. It was founded in 1969. It offers education for junior and senior high school.

== Gallery ==
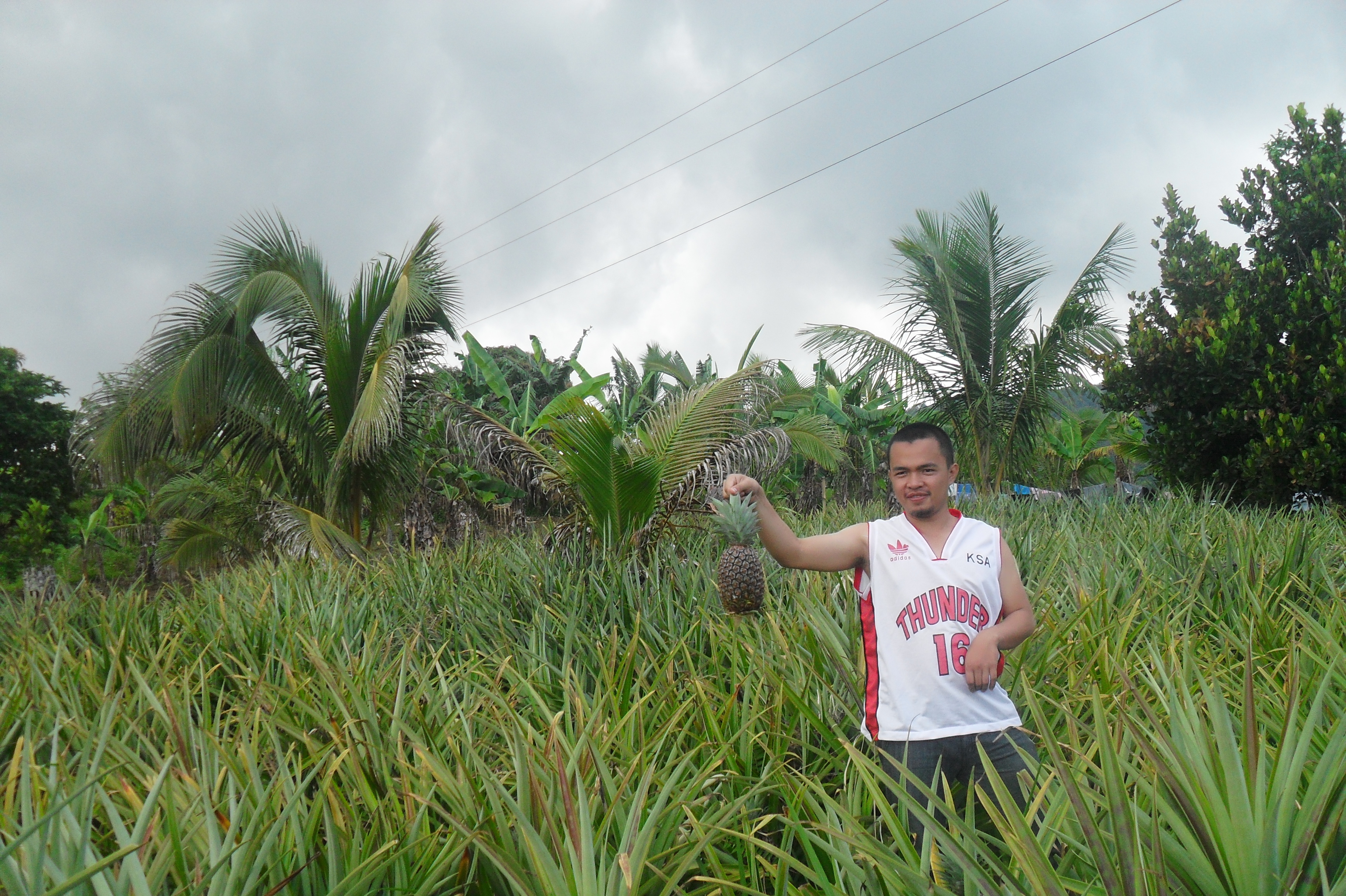
At Bantyan, Pualas
