= Madamba =

Municipality in Lanao del Sur, Philippines

Madamba مادامبا
- Municipality
- Municipality of Madamba
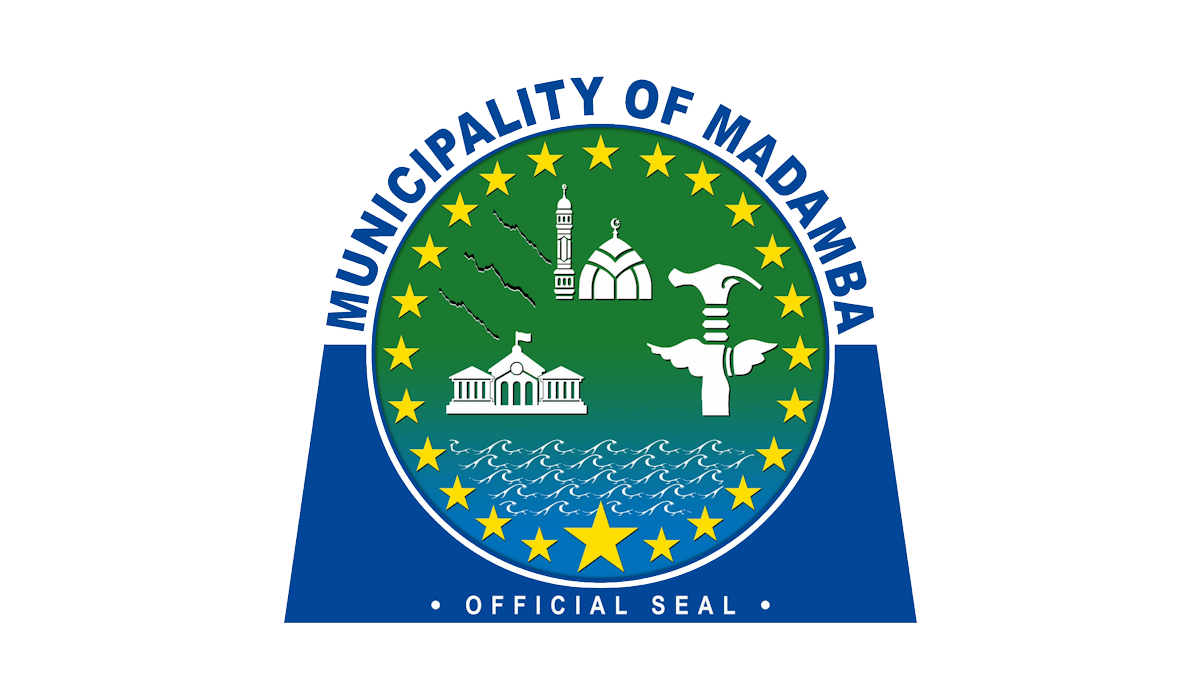
- Flag Seal

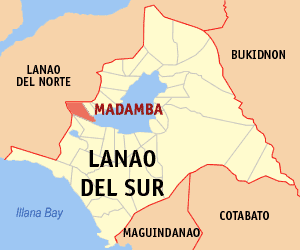
- Map of Lanao del Sur with Madamba highlighted
- Interactive map of Madamba
- Location within the Philippines
- Coordinates: 7°51′31″N 124°02′58″E
- Country: Philippines
- Region: Bangsamoro Autonomous Region in Muslim Mindanao
- Province: Lanao del Sur
- House district: 2nd district
- Parliamentary district: 7th district
- Barangays: 24 (see Barangays)

Government
  - Type: Sangguniang Bayan
  - Mayor: Amer Hussein M. Mindalano
  - Vice Mayor: Jalani M. Mindalano
  - House Representative: Yasser A. Balindong
  - Municipal Council: Members: Jalane N. Mambuay; Shailane A. Mindalano; Jabber I. Mindalano; Mohammad Yassin Alauya A. Mindalano Jr.; Khalid S. Mindalano; Cairoden L. Mesug; Nurhannah P. Ali; Yusoph S. Mindalano
  - Electorate: 10,405 voters (2025)

Area
  - Total: 225.00 km^{2} (86.87 sq mi)
- Highest elevation: 1,678 m (5,505 ft)
- Lowest elevation: 732 m (2,402 ft)

Population (2024 census)
  - Total: 24,886
  - Density: 110.60/km^{2} (286.46/sq mi)
  - Households: 3,339

Economy
  - Income class: 3rd municipal income class
  - Poverty incidence: 25.89% (2023)
  - Revenue: ₱ 188.2 million (2024)
  - Assets: ₱ 96.87 million (2024)
  - Expenditure: ₱ 177.1 million (2024)
  - Liabilities: ₱ 0.2851 million (2022, 2023, 2024)

Service provider
  - Electricity: Lanao del Sur Electric Cooperative (LASURECO)
- Time zone: UTC+8 (PST)
- ZIP code: 9314
- PSGC: 1903614000
- IDD : area code: +63 (0)63
- Native languages: Maranao; Tagalog
- Website: www.madamba-lds.gov.ph

Madamba, officially the Municipality of Madamba (Maranao: Inged a Madamba; Tagalog: Bayan ng Madamba), is a municipality in the province of Lanao del Sur, Philippines. According to the 2024 census, it has a population of 24,886 people.

== Geography ==
=== Barangays ===
Madamba is politically subdivided into 24 barangays. Each barangay consists of puroks while some have sitios.

- Balintad
- Balagunun
- Bawang
- Biabe (Saumay a poon sa Butig, Mulondo and Taraka)
- Bubong Uya-an (CREATED BY HON.HADJI AMER AMPASO MANALUNDONG)
- Cabasaran (Ingud o Ampatua Sa Madamba)
- Dibarusan
- Lakitan
- Liangan
- Linuk
- Lumbaca Ingud
- Palao (Barangay of Naga Ampaso Manardas)
- Pantaon
- Pantar (Ingud o Angkapa sa Madamba )
- Madamba (Poblacion Madamba)
- Punud (Murepaga o Shakba sa Lawasa Eg)
- Tabaran
- Tambo
- Tuca
- Uyaan
  - Ampaso – Poon sa Binidayan
  - Saumay – Poon sa Butig, Taraka, Mulondo
  - Hmping - poon sa kapuruan a marantao
  - Diwat - Poon sa Cotabato a Pagari o Patimata
- Tulay
- Ilian
- Pagayonan
- Pangadapan

=== Climate ===
Climate data for Madamba, Lanao de Sur
Month	Jan	Feb	Mar	Apr	May	Jun	Jul	Aug	Sep	Oct	Nov	Dec	Year
Mean daily maximum °C (°F)	24 (75)	24 (75)	25 (77)	26 (79)	25 (77)	25 (77)	25 (77)	25 (77)	25 (77)	25 (77)	25 (77)	24 (75)	25 (77)
Mean daily minimum °C (°F)	20 (68)	19 (66)	20 (68)	20 (68)	21 (70)	21 (70)	20 (68)	20 (68)	20 (68)	20 (68)	20 (68)	20 (68)	20 (68)
Average precipitation mm (inches)	159 (6.3)	143 (5.6)	166 (6.5)	183 (7.2)	357 (14.1)	414 (16.3)	333 (13.1)	309 (12.2)	289 (11.4)	285 (11.2)	253 (10.0)	166 (6.5)	3,057 (120.4)
Average rainy days	18.4	17.2	20.6	23.4	29.3	29.2	29.9	29.4	27.7	28.7	25.5	19.9	299.2
Source: Meteoblue (modeled/calculated data, not measured locally)

== Demographics ==
Population census of Madamba
Year	Pop.	±% p.a.
1918	1,453	—
1939	3,802	+4.69%
1948	6,877	+6.81%
1960	10,795	+3.83%
1970	12,161	+1.20%
1975	12,379	+0.36%
1980	7,355	−9.89%
1990	10,428	+3.55%
1995	11,914	+2.53%
2000	15,442	+5.72%
2007	19,587	+3.33%
2010	15,542	−8.07%
2015	17,756	+2.57%
2020	22,050	+4.66%
2024	24,886	+2.95%
Source: Philippine Statistics Authority

== Economy ==
Poverty Incidence of Madamba

Source: Philippine Statistics Authority
