= Pagayawan =

Municipality in Lanao del Sur, Philippines

Pagayawan باغاياوان Tatarikan
- Municipality
- Municipality of Pagayawan
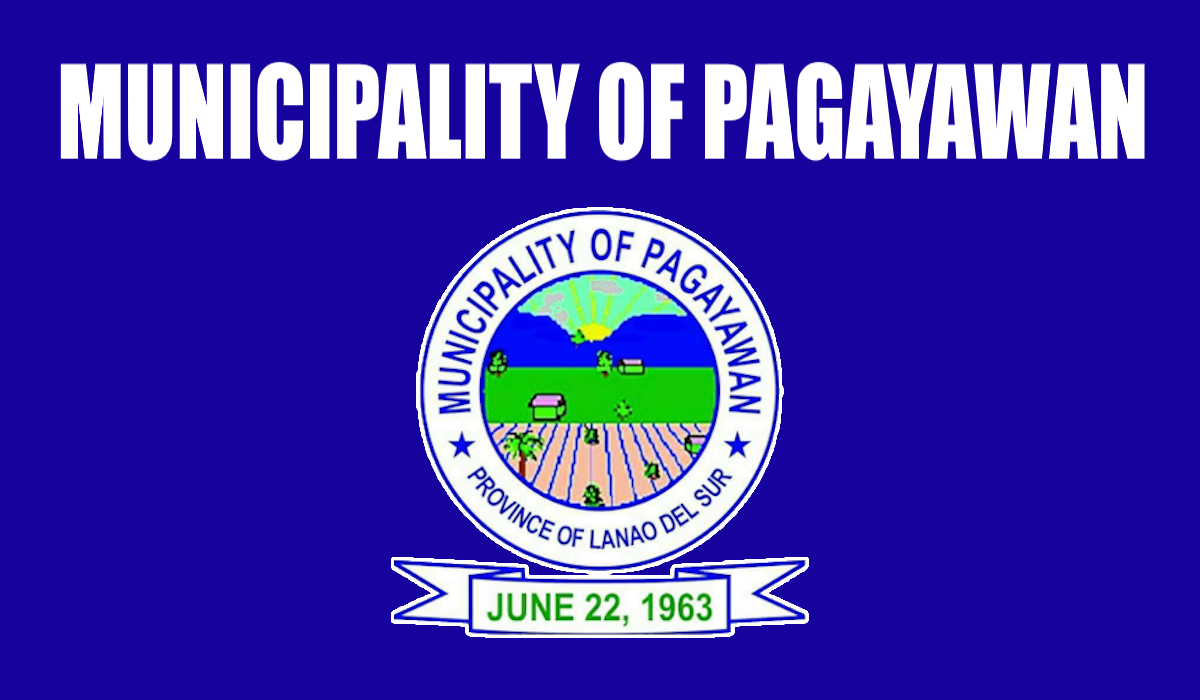
- Flag Seal

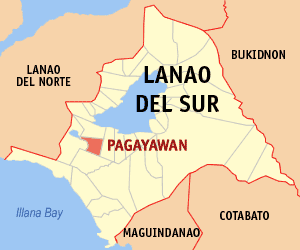
- Map of Lanao del Sur with Pagayawan highlighted
- Interactive map of Pagayawan
- Location within the Philippines
- Coordinates: 7°47′57″N 124°05′53″E
- Country: Philippines
- Region: Bangsamoro Autonomous Region in Muslim Mindanao
- Province: Lanao del Sur
- House district: 2nd district
- Parliamentary district: 6th district
- Barangays: 18 (see Barangays)

Government
  - Type: Sangguniang Bayan
  - Mayor: Khalida P. Sanguila
  - Vice Mayor: Salman D. Polao
  - House Representative: Yasser A. Balindong
  - Municipal Council: Members: Hanirah D. Polao; Alindaya S. Dipatuan; Abdul M. Diamla; Sodaiz P. Aba; Arip S. Esmayatin; Johary M. Diamael; Cola M. Marohomsalic; Lolo S. Abdullah
  - Electorate: 9,134 voters (2025)

Area
  - Total: 218.00 km^{2} (84.17 sq mi)
- Elevation: 708 m (2,323 ft)
- Highest elevation: 1,372 m (4,501 ft)
- Lowest elevation: 355 m (1,165 ft)

Population (2024 census)
  - Total: 15,659
  - Density: 71.830/km^{2} (186.04/sq mi)
  - Households: 2,107

Economy
  - Income class: 3rd municipal income class
  - Poverty incidence: 28.64% (2023)
  - Revenue: ₱ 138.4 million (2024)
  - Assets: ₱ 196.7 million (2024)
  - Expenditure: ₱ 134.8 million (2024)
  - Liabilities: ₱ 76.78 million (2024)

Service provider
  - Electricity: Lanao del Sur Electric Cooperative (LASURECO)
- Time zone: UTC+8 (PST)
- ZIP code: 9312
- PSGC: 1903620000
- IDD : area code: +63 (0)63
- Native languages: Maranao; Tagalog
- Website: www.pagayawan-lds.gov.ph

Pagayawan, officially the Municipality of Pagayawan (Maranao: Inged a Pagayawan; Tagalog: Bayan ng Pagayawan), is a municipality in the province of Lanao del Sur, Philippines. According to the 2024 census, it has a population of 15,659 people.

In 2018, Pagayawan had the highest poverty incidence among municipalities, with an estimated poverty rate of 89.6%. This means that, on average, 9 out of every 10 residents were considered poor.

== History ==
The municipal district of Tatarikan was created as a municipality through Executive Order No. 42 by then President Diosdado Macapagal with effectivity of July 1, 1962. On June 22, 1963, the municipality was renamed to its current name, Pagayawan.

Pagayawan among Borowa belong to Nine Princess of Unayan (e.g. in Meranau term Andong so Macadar, Angkulan so Bita, Dadauba so Biabi, Sana Lumbayanague, etc.)

== Geography ==
=== Barangays ===
Pagayawan is politically subdivided into 18 barangays. Each barangay consists of puroks while some have sitios.

- Ayong
- Bandara Ingud
- Bangon (Poblacion)
- Biala-an
- Diampaca
- Guiarong
- Ilian
- Madang
- Mapantao
- Ngingir (Kabasaran)
- Padas
- Paigoay
- Pinalangca
- Poblacion (Lumbac)
- Rangiran
- Rubokun
- Linindingan
- Kalaludan

=== Climate ===
Climate data for Pagayawan, Lanao de Sur
Month	Jan	Feb	Mar	Apr	May	Jun	Jul	Aug	Sep	Oct	Nov	Dec	Year
Mean daily maximum °C (°F)	23 (73)	24 (75)	24 (75)	25 (77)	25 (77)	24 (75)	24 (75)	24 (75)	25 (77)	24 (75)	24 (75)	24 (75)	24 (75)
Mean daily minimum °C (°F)	19 (66)	19 (66)	19 (66)	20 (68)	20 (68)	20 (68)	20 (68)	19 (66)	20 (68)	20 (68)	20 (68)	19 (66)	20 (67)
Average precipitation mm (inches)	159 (6.3)	143 (5.6)	166 (6.5)	183 (7.2)	357 (14.1)	414 (16.3)	333 (13.1)	309 (12.2)	289 (11.4)	285 (11.2)	253 (10.0)	166 (6.5)	3,057 (120.4)
Average rainy days	18.4	17.2	20.6	23.4	29.3	29.2	29.9	29.4	27.7	28.7	25.5	19.9	299.2
Source: Meteoblue (modeled/calculated data, not measured locally)

== Demographics ==
Population census of Pagayawan
Year	Pop.	±% p.a.
1918	722	—
1939	1,658	+4.04%
1948	4,395	+11.44%
1960	10,739	+7.73%
1970	10,566	−0.16%
1975	14,749	+6.92%
1980	5,348	−18.36%
1990	8,507	+4.75%
1995	8,900	+0.85%
2000	9,757	+1.99%
2007	18,374	+9.12%
2010	11,349	−16.08%
2015	13,139	+2.83%
2020	15,057	+2.91%
2024	15,659	+0.95%
Source: Philippine Statistics Authority

== Economy ==
Poverty Incidence of Pagayawan

Source: Philippine Statistics Authority

== Government ==
- Somerado Naga Benito (term ended:1998)
- Datu Anwar Benito Datumulok (term ended:2004)
- Mohammad Khalid Diamel (term ended:2013)
- Hanifa Aloyodan-Diamel (present mayor)
