= Tugaya =

Municipality in Lanao del Sur, Philippines

Tugaya توغايا
- Municipality
- Municipality of Tugaya
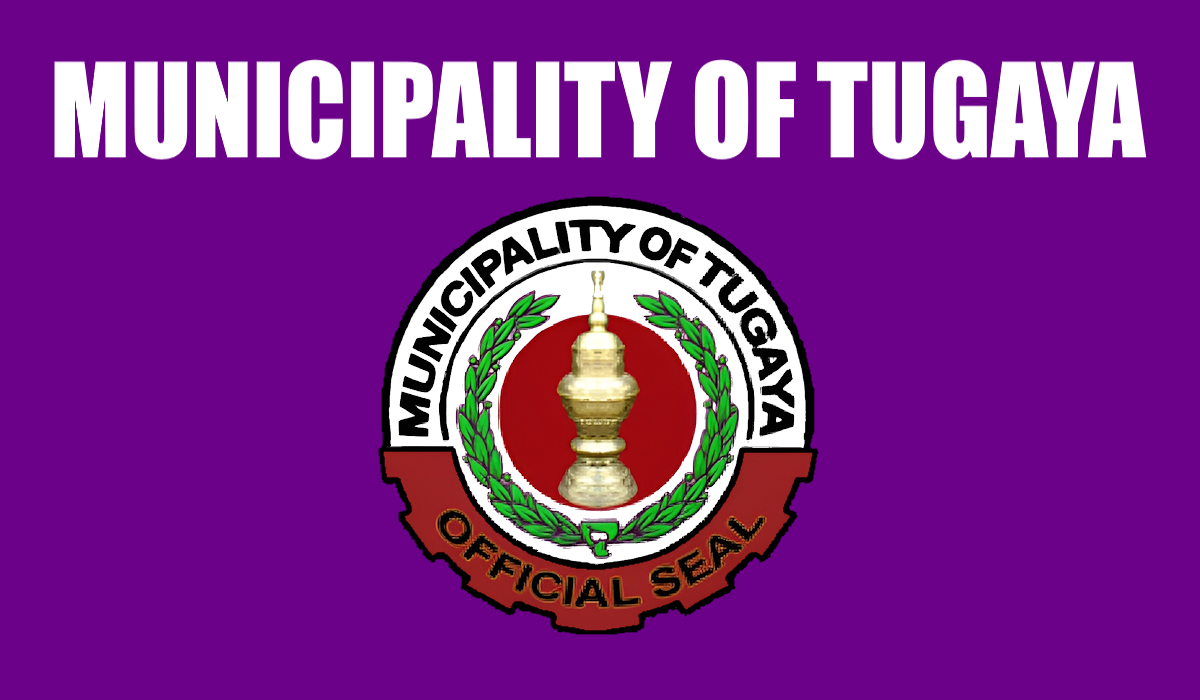
- Flag Seal
- Nickname: "Industrial Capital of Lanao del Sur"
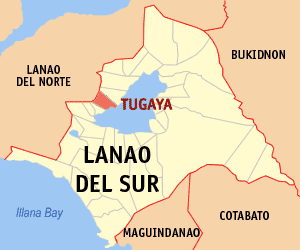
- Map of Lanao del Sur with Tugaya highlighted
- Interactive map of Tugaya
- Location within the Philippines
- Coordinates: 7°52′59″N 124°10′36″E
- Country: Philippines
- Region: Bangsamoro Autonomous Region in Muslim Mindanao
- Province: Lanao del Sur
- House district: 2nd district
- Parliamentary district: 7th district
- Barangays: 23 (see Barangays)

Government
  - Type: Sangguniang Bayan
  - Mayor: Alfattah N. Pacalna
  - Vice Mayor: Alber N. Balindong
  - House Representative: Yasser A. Balindong
  - Municipal Council: Members: Homaid B. Saidali; Queen Maharlani M. Paclana; Mujahid N. Abdulmalic; Omair B. Pacalna; Abdulhakim A. Mala; Noman S. Hadji Zaman; Iyas P. Usman; Arham A. Abdulazis
  - Electorate: 14,795 voters (2025)

Area
  - Total: 155.10 km^{2} (59.88 sq mi)
- Elevation: 862 m (2,828 ft)
- Highest elevation: 1,814 m (5,951 ft)
- Lowest elevation: 696 m (2,283 ft)

Population (2024 census)
  - Total: 26,283
  - Density: 169.46/km^{2} (438.90/sq mi)
  - Households: 3,298

Economy
  - Income class: 3rd municipal income class
  - Poverty incidence: 21.08% (2023)
  - Revenue: ₱ 162 million (2024)
  - Assets: ₱ 223.7 million (2024)
  - Expenditure: ₱ 142.2 million (2024)
  - Liabilities: ₱ 106.9 million (2024)

Service provider
  - Electricity: Lanao del Sur Electric Cooperative (LASURECO)
- Time zone: UTC+8 (PST)
- ZIP code: 9317
- PSGC: 1903629000
- IDD : area code: +63 (0)63
- Native languages: Maranao; Tagalog
- Website: www.tugaya-lds.gov.ph

Tugaya, officially the Municipality of Tugaya (Maranao: Inged a Tugaya; Tagalog: Bayan ng Tugaya), is a municipality in the province of Lanao del Sur, Philippines. According to the 2024 census, it has a population of 26,283 people.

The municipality, also known as Togaya, is known as the "Industrial Capital of Lanao del Sur" due to its Maranao crafts which includes gongs, drums, musical instruments, weaves, baskets, and metalwares, among others. It is also distinguished as a 'UNESCO Home for Culture and Heritage'.

== Geography ==
Tugaya has a land area of 4028 hectares, equal to 40.28 square kilometers. Tugaya is located on the shores of the largest lake on Mindanao Island: Lake Lanao.

=== Barangays ===
Tugaya is politically subdivided into 23 barangays. Each barangay consists of puroks while some have sitios.

- Bagoaingud
- Bubong
- Buadi Alawang
- Buadi Dico
- Campong Talao
- Cayagan
- Dandanun
- Dilimbayan
- Engud Poblacion
- Gurain
- Lumbac
- Maidan
- Mapantao
- Pagalamatan
- Pandiaranao
- Pindolonan I
- Pindolonan II
- Putad
- Raya
- Sugod I
- Sugod A Mawatan
- Sumbaga Rogong
- Tangcal

=== Climate ===
Climate data for Tugaya, Lanao del Sur
Month	Jan	Feb	Mar	Apr	May	Jun	Jul	Aug	Sep	Oct	Nov	Dec	Year
Mean daily maximum °C (°F)	24 (75)	24 (75)	25 (77)	26 (79)	26 (79)	25 (77)	25 (77)	25 (77)	25 (77)	25 (77)	25 (77)	25 (77)	25 (77)
Mean daily minimum °C (°F)	20 (68)	20 (68)	20 (68)	20 (68)	21 (70)	21 (70)	20 (68)	20 (68)	20 (68)	21 (70)	20 (68)	20 (68)	20 (69)
Average precipitation mm (inches)	159 (6.3)	143 (5.6)	166 (6.5)	183 (7.2)	357 (14.1)	414 (16.3)	333 (13.1)	309 (12.2)	289 (11.4)	285 (11.2)	253 (10.0)	166 (6.5)	3,057 (120.4)
Average rainy days	18.4	17.2	20.6	23.4	29.3	29.2	29.9	29.4	27.7	28.7	25.5	19.9	299.2
Source: Meteoblue (modeled/calculated data, not measured locally)

== Demographics ==
Population census of Tugaya
Year	Pop.	±% p.a.
1918	2,182	—
1939	4,261	+3.24%
1948	7,039	+5.74%
1960	7,052	+0.02%
1970	12,262	+5.68%
1975	10,446	−3.16%
1980	12,406	+3.50%
1990	17,103	+3.26%
1995	17,552	+0.49%
2000	20,139	+2.99%
2007	24,017	+2.46%
2010	22,235	−2.77%
2015	23,814	+1.32%
2020	24,778	+0.84%
2024	26,283	+1.43%
Source: Philippine Statistics Authority

== Economy ==
Poverty Incidence of Tugaya

Source: Philippine Statistics Authority

== Arts and culture ==
Tugaya is unique in that the town is inhabited almost entirely by craftsmen and artisans of various pursuits. Each household specializes in some form of art or craft that is part of traditional Maranao culture: back-strap loom weaving, tapestry weaving, and other kinds of handmade textile manufacture; foundry casting of various forms of brass or bronze vessels, instruments, and decorative items; wood-carving and mother-of-pearl inlay work; metalwork and silver- and gold-smithing—all of which utilize the traditional Maranao form of decoration, okir. From this community come the artisans called upon to decorate major forms of architecture in the traditional manner, e.g., the Maranao "torogan" or royal houses. Performance arts are also unique among the residents of Tugaya, where the penchant for the artistic spills out into everyday games and mundane articles of domestic use.

Textile weaving in Tugaya includes traditional Southeast Asian back-strap loom weaving, utilizing indigenous okir decorative motifs. Laborious, expert needle-weaving produces the complex "langkit" panels which are incorporated into the traditional Maranao garment, the "malong landap". Foundries employ the cire perdue or "lost wax" method to produce various types of bronze or brass products which follow traditional forms, such as the "gador" (a pair of ornate brass urns). Metal forging uses the traditional Southeast Asian double-bellows forge, and employs traditional tools. Other forms of metalwork include hand shaping and pounding of metal sheets, a laborious method which transforms flat metal sheets into sturdy, solid metal Maranao kulintang ensemble gong instruments, including "gandingan" and "agong". Woodworking includes manufacture of decorative objects, ornate furniture such as the traditional storage chest "baul", musical instruments such as the large drum "dadabuan", and ceremonial 12-foot-tall Maranao drums (such as were used for the adhan in the 1800s). Carved and painted wood products also feature the distinctive okir decorative motifs.

Nearly every member of the community is engaged in one or more of these forms of traditional arts and crafts, and many of their products are specially ordered on a regular basis by merchants in Davao City, which is the largest city on Mindanao island, a full day's drive from Tugaya. When displayed in the stores of Davao City, Tugaya's products are purchased by locals and international visitors, and by professional buyers from the department stores and tourist shops of MetroManila.

Thus, Tugaya supplies both inhabitants and visitors to Metro Manila with high quality, traditional, handmade items which are identified to customers as simply being "from Mindanao". Majority of items sold in Metro Manila as being "from Mindanao" are actually manufactured in Indonesia or Thailand, but are represented as being from Mindanao because the items were imported into Davao City by a middleman before being re-sold and transported to Metro Manila.

== Torogan Architectural Planned Towns ==
The Kawayan Torogan is the oldest known torogan in the Philippines, located in Marantao municipality. It is a traditional Maranao house built for royal Maranao families. There was once a campaign where the people wanted the municipalities of Marantao and Tugaya to pass an ordinance where the architectural scheme of the two towns will follow only the totogan style, in effect, preserve the Maranao people's most royal architectural style and lead to the first two towns with a planned town landscape under an indigenous Maranao architecture. However, the campaign led to deaf ears due to little funding available.

== Sunken Heritage ==
Aside from the current heritage of Tugaya today, the town also hosted the oldest mosque in Lanao del Sur until 1955 where the region was hit by an earthquake. The entire mosque sank beneath Lake Lanao along with hundreds of heritage pieces. Majority of the sunken artifacts have not been researched on by the National Museum of the Philippines due to tensions in the area. The lake is known as one of the deepest in the country and one of the 17 most ancient lakes in the world.

== UNESCO Significance ==
The Old Town of Tugaya was formerly listed in the UNESCO Tentative List for Heritage Sites. However, it was dropped from the list as UNESCO officials announced that the site was better to be nominated in the UNESCO Intangible Cultural Heritage List instead due to its many intangible heritages. The National Commission for Culture and the Arts was tasked to do the job.
