= Bacolod-Kalawi =

Municipality in Lanao del Sur, Philippines

Bacolod-Kalawi باكولود كالاوي Bacolod Grande
- Municipality
- Municipality of Bacolod-Kalawi
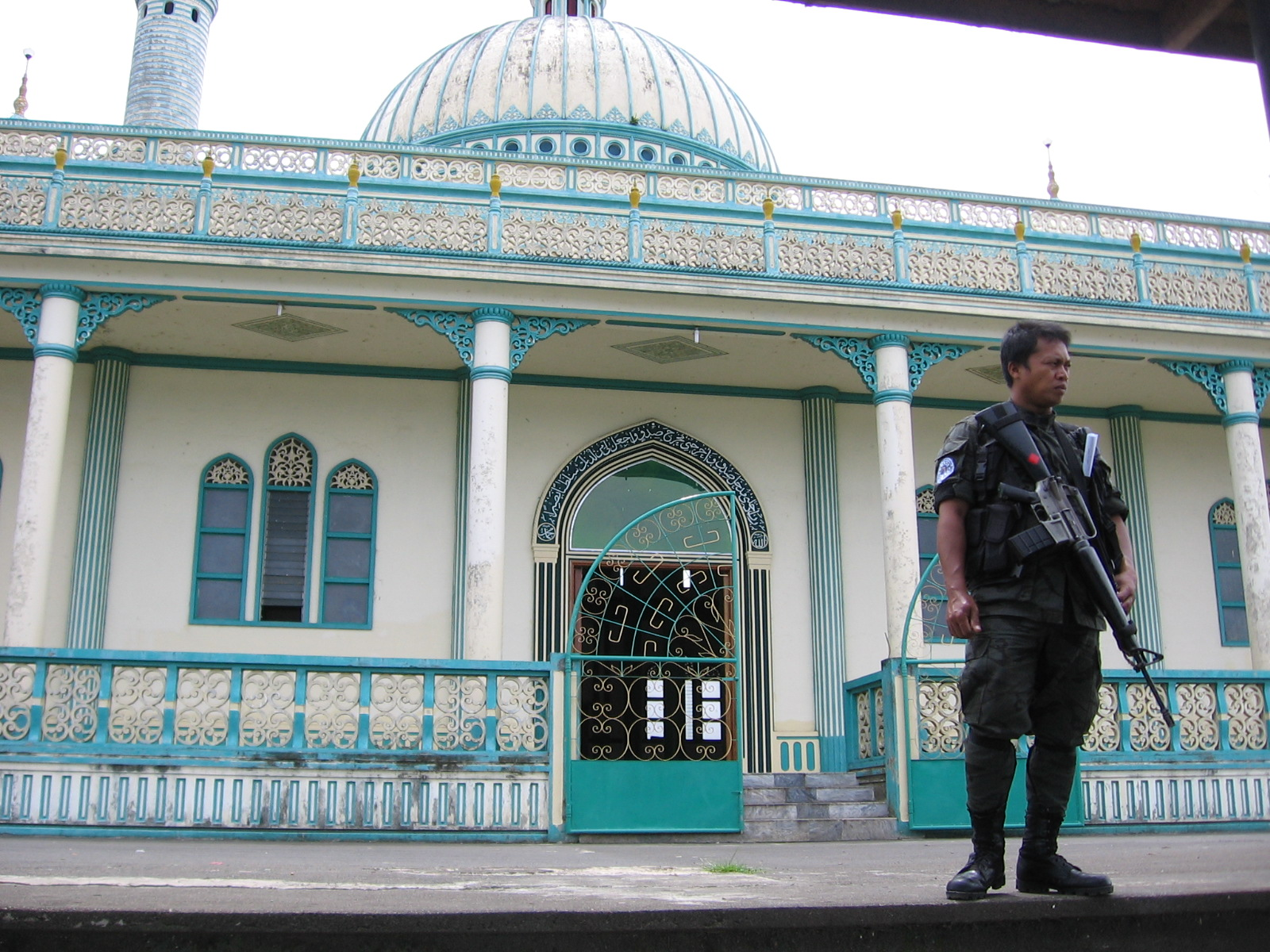
- Masjid Bacolod

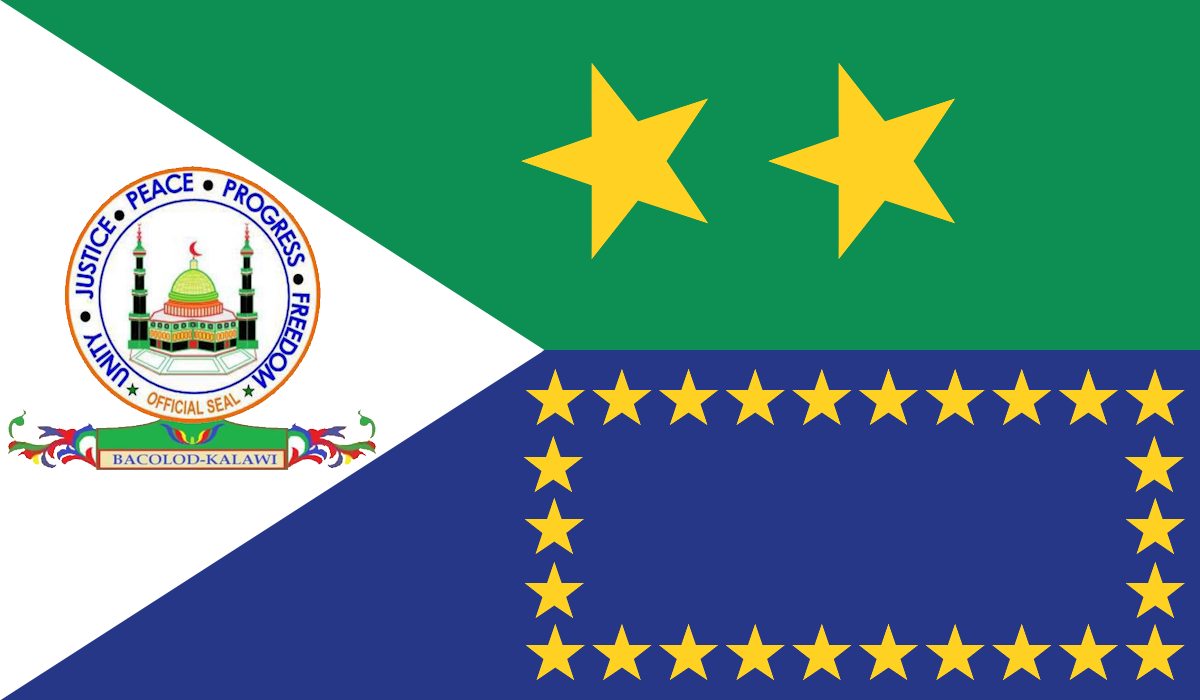
- Flag Seal

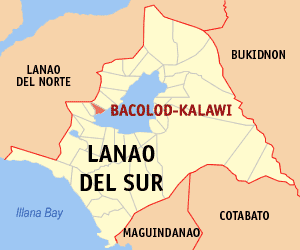
- Map of Lanao del Sur with Bacolod-Kalawi highlighted
- Interactive map of Bacolod-Kalawi
- Location within the Philippines
- Coordinates: 7°51′20″N 124°08′23″E
- Country: Philippines
- Region: Bangsamoro Autonomous Region in Muslim Mindanao
- Province: Lanao del Sur
- House district: 2nd district
- Parliamentary district: 7th district
- Barangays: 26 (see Barangays)

Government
  - Type: Sangguniang Bayan
  - Mayor: Abdulmohaimen L. Dipatuan
  - Vice Mayor: Hanil L. Dipatuan
  - House Representative: Yasser A. Balindong
  - Municipal Council: Members: Khalid T. Amboloto; Noroldin B. Guro; Mohammad M. Arang; Mohammad Rayan B. Adapun; Manjursa S. Asalan; Jamil P. Umpat; Abdulbaqui R. Mamandi; Safra D. Macasalong
  - Electorate: 10,713 voters (2025)

Area
  - Total: 491.57 km^{2} (189.80 sq mi)
- Elevation: 877 m (2,877 ft)
- Highest elevation: 1,801 m (5,909 ft)
- Lowest elevation: 696 m (2,283 ft)

Population (2024 census)
  - Total: 24,381
  - Density: 49.598/km^{2} (128.46/sq mi)
  - Households: 3,667

Economy
  - Income class: 1st municipal income class
  - Poverty incidence: 14.33% (2023)
  - Revenue: ₱ 255.8 million (2024)
  - Assets: ₱ 361.2 million (2024)
  - Expenditure: ₱ 220.6 million (2024)
  - Liabilities: ₱ 121.2 million (2024)

Service provider
  - Electricity: Lanao del Sur Electric Cooperative (LASURECO)
- Time zone: UTC+8 (PST)
- ZIP code: 9316
- PSGC: 1903601000
- IDD : area code: +63 (0)63
- Native languages: Maranao; Tagalog
- Website: www.bacolod-lds.gov.ph

Bacolod-Kalawi, officially the Municipality of Bacolod-Kalawi (Maranao and Iranun: Inged a Bacolod-Kalawi; Tagalog: Bayan ng Bacolod-Kalawi), is a municipality in the province of Lanao del Sur, Philippines. According to the 2024 census, it has a population of 24,381 people.

Formerly known as Bacolod Grande, it was changed into its present name by virtue of Muslim Mindanao Autonomy Act No. 32 in 1994.

== Geography ==
=== Barangays ===
Bacolod-Kalawi is politically subdivided into 26 barangays. Each barangay consists of puroks while some have sitios.

- Ampao
- Bagoaingud
- Balut
- Barua
- Buadiawani
- Bubong
- Daramoyod
- Dilabayan
- Dipatuan
- Gandamato
- Gurain
- Ilian
- Lama
- Liawao
- Lumbaca-Ingud
- Madanding
- Orong
- Pindolonan
- Poblacion I
- Poblacion II
- Raya
- Rorowan
- Sugod
- Tambo
- Tuka I
- Tuka II

=== Climate ===
Climate data for Bacolod-Kalawi, Lanao de Sur
| Month | Jan | Feb | Mar | Apr | May | Jun | Jul | Aug | Sep | Oct | Nov | Dec | Year |
|---|---|---|---|---|---|---|---|---|---|---|---|---|---|
| Mean daily maximum °C (°F) | 24 (75) | 25 (77) | 25 (77) | 26 (79) | 26 (79) | 25 (77) | 25 (77) | 25 (77) | 26 (79) | 25 (77) | 25 (77) | 25 (77) | 25 (77) |
| Mean daily minimum °C (°F) | 20 (68) | 20 (68) | 20 (68) | 21 (70) | 21 (70) | 21 (70) | 20 (68) | 20 (68) | 20 (68) | 21 (70) | 21 (70) | 20 (68) | 20 (69) |
| Average precipitation mm (inches) | 159 (6.3) | 143 (5.6) | 166 (6.5) | 183 (7.2) | 357 (14.1) | 414 (16.3) | 333 (13.1) | 309 (12.2) | 289 (11.4) | 285 (11.2) | 253 (10.0) | 166 (6.5) | 3,057 (120.4) |
| Average rainy days | 18.4 | 17.2 | 20.6 | 23.4 | 29.3 | 29.2 | 29.9 | 29.4 | 27.7 | 28.7 | 25.5 | 19.9 | 299.2 |
Source: Meteoblue (modeled/calculated data, not measured locally)

== Demographics ==
Population census of Bacolod-Kalawi
| Year | Pop. | ±% p.a. |
|---|---|---|
| 1918 | 1,612 | — |
| 1939 | 4,507 | +5.02% |
| 1948 | 7,728 | +6.17% |
| 1960 | 14,233 | +5.22% |
| 1970 | 15,609 | +0.93% |
| 1975 | 13,751 | −2.51% |
| 1980 | 9,495 | −7.14% |
| 1990 | 12,077 | +2.43% |
| 1995 | 16,145 | +5.59% |
| 2000 | 17,761 | +2.07% |
| 2007 | 20,564 | +2.04% |
| 2010 | 18,555 | −3.67% |
| 2015 | 20,841 | +2.24% |
| 2020 | 23,129 | +2.22% |
| 2024 | 24,381 | +1.27% |
Source: Philippine Statistics Authority

== Economy ==
Poverty Incidence of Bacolod-Kalawi

Source: Philippine Statistics Authority

== Government ==
=== List of Municipal District Presidents ===
- Dimapondig (Appointed)
- Hadji Pangandaman Masacal (Appointed)

=== List of Mayors ===
- 1956–1960, Hadji Pangandaman Masacal (First appointed mayor)
- 1960–1964, Hadji Pangandaman Masacal (First elected mayor)
- 1964–1968, Sultan Rasuman M. Dipatuan
- 1968–1972, Sultan Rasuman M. Dipatuan
- 1972–19??, Sultan Rasuman M. Dipatuan
- 1986–1988, Aleem Hosain Amanoddin (Appointed)
- 1988–1992, Aleem Hosain Amanoddin
- 1992–1995, Dimangadap D. Dipatuan
- 1995–1998, Dimangadap D. Dipatuan
- 1998–2001, Dimangadap D. Dipatuan
- 2001–2004, Noaim A. Dipatuan
- 2004–2007, Noaim A. Dipatuan
- 2007–2010, Diarangan R. Dipatuan
- 2010–2013, Diarangan R. Dipatuan
- 2013–2016, Abdulmohaimen L. Dipatuan
- 2016–2019, Abdulmohaimen L. Dipatuan
- 2019–2022, Nora L. Dipatuan
- 2022–2025, Abdulmohaimen L. Dipatuan
- 2025–present, Abdulmohaimen L. Dipatuan

== Education ==
Secondary

- Bacolod-Kalawi National High School
- Bacolod-Grande National High School

Elementary

- Bacolod Central Elementary School
- Kalawi Central Elementary School
- Balut Primary School
- Dilabayan Primary School
- Tulain Primary School
- Tuka Primary School
- Talob Primary School
- Pindulonan Elementary School
- Awani Elementary School
- Barua Elementary School
- Ulodan Elementary School
- Tambo Primary School
- Gurain Primary School
- Cabombongan Elementary School

Madrasah

- Ma'ahad Bacolod Grande Al-Islamie (Pilot Madrasah)
- Ma'ahad Al-Irshad Al-Islamie, Inc. (Pilot Madrasah)
- Ma'ahad Kalawi Bacolod Al-Islamie
- Madrasah Al-Rashadiyah Al-Islamiyah, Inc.

== See also ==
- List of renamed cities and municipalities in the Philippines
