= Pantao =

Pantao is the name of several barangays in the Philippines:

Pantao only

- Pantao, Calatrava, Negros Occidental
- Pantao, Libon, Albay
- Pantao, Mabinay, Negros Oriental
- Pantao, Munai, Lanao del Norte
- Pantao, Poona Bayabao, Lanao del Sur
- Pantao, San Jose de Buenavista, Antique
- Pantao, Sibalom, Antique
- Pantao, Talipao, Sulu

With Pantao

- Pangandaman Pantao, Masiu, Lanao del Sur
- Pantao-A-Munai, Munai, Lanao del Norte
- Pantao-Marug, Pantar, Lanao del Norte
- Pantao-Ranao, Pantar, Lanao del Norte
- Pantao Raya, Poona Piagapo, Lanao del Norte
- Pantao Raya, Saguiaran, Lanao del Sur

Pantao may also refer to:

- Peaches of Immortality in Chinese mythology
