= Baroy =

Municipality in Lanao del Norte, Philippines

- Municipality
- Municipality of Baroy
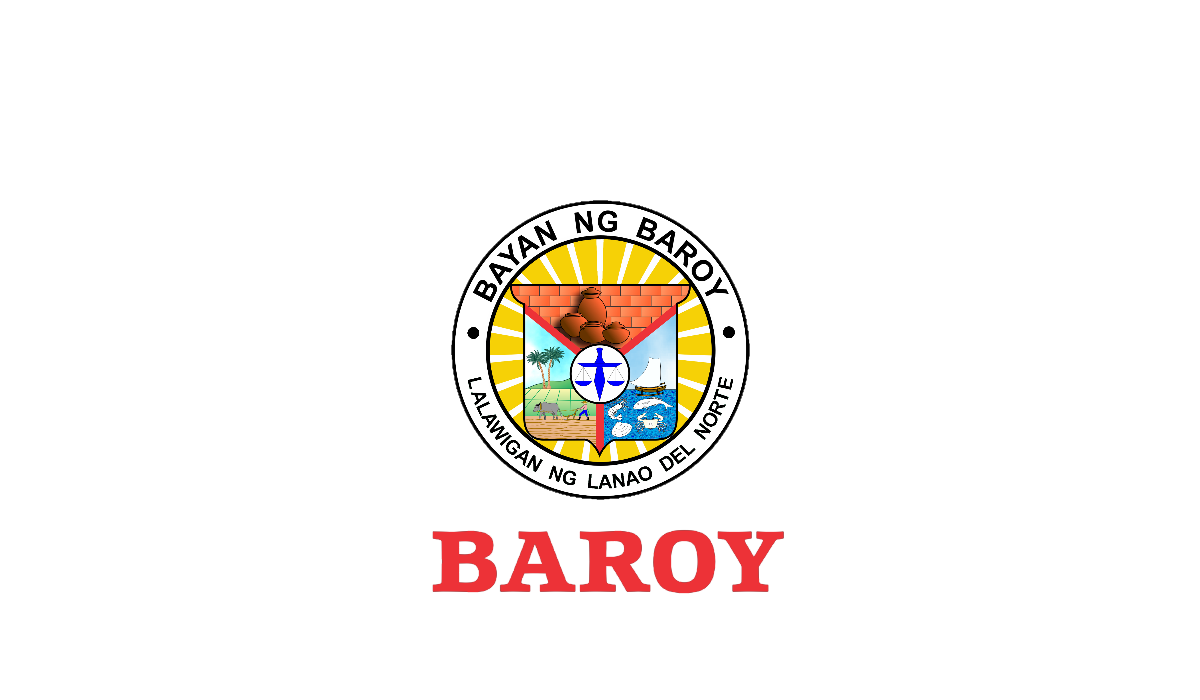
- Flag Seal

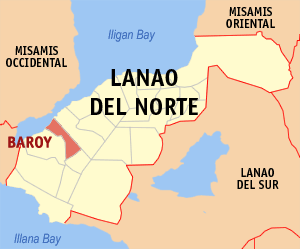
- Map of Lanao del Norte with Baroy highlighted
- Interactive map of Baroy
- Location within the Philippines
- Coordinates: 8°01′34″N 123°46′42″E
- Country: Philippines
- Region: Northern Mindanao
- Province: Lanao del Norte
- District: 1st district
- Founded: June 10, 1949
- Barangays: 23 (see Barangays)

Government
  - Type: Sangguniang Bayan
  - Mayor: Grelina Mantohac-Lim
  - Vice Mayor: Rosa D. Olafsson
  - Representative: Mohamad Khalid Q. Dimaporo
  - Municipal Council: Members: Edwin R. Ong I; Eric C. Basalo; Rudiric S. Rizon; Sulpicia D. Abamonga; Romuel John G. Buhat; Gilbert J. Jumawan; Rhizie C. Sularte; Manuel D. Roda
  - Electorate: 19,290 voters (2025)

Area
  - Total: 72.35 km^{2} (27.93 sq mi)
- Elevation: 17 m (56 ft)
- Highest elevation: 223 m (732 ft)
- Lowest elevation: 0 m (0 ft)

Population (2024 census)
  - Total: 24,763
  - Density: 342.3/km^{2} (886.5/sq mi)
  - Households: 6,585

Economy
  - Income class: 4th municipal income class
  - Poverty incidence: 25.28% (2023)
  - Revenue: ₱ 137.2 million (2024)
  - Assets: ₱ 466.7 million (2024)
  - Expenditure: ₱ 140 million (2024)
  - Liabilities: ₱ 110.2 million (2024)

Service provider
  - Electricity: Lanao del Norte Electric Cooperative (LANECO)
  - Water: Tubod-Baroy Water District (TBWD)
- Time zone: UTC+8 (PST)
- ZIP code: 9210
- PSGC: 1003503000
- IDD : area code: +63 (0)63
- Native languages: Maranao; Cebuano; Binukid; Tagalog
- Website: www.baroy.gov.ph

Baroy, officially the Municipality of Baroy (Maranao: Inged a Baroy; Cebuano: Lungsod sa Baroy; Tagalog: Bayan ng Baroy), is a municipality in the province of Lanao del Norte, Philippines. According to the 2024 census, it has a population of 24,763 people.

== History ==
As early as 1918, Baroy was originally called Baloy, a plant commonly found in the community that is used for mat weaving. Later on, the said plant became extinct and the inhabitants of the locality decided to change the name to Baroy.

The municipality of Baroy was formerly a mere barrio of the municipal district of Kolambugan. When Tubod was separated from Kolambugan (Republic Act No. 58, October 17, 1946), the barrios of Baroy, Sagadan, and Princesa were brought along with it. It became a regular municipality on June 10, 1949, by virtue of Executive Order No. 222 during the term of President Elpidio L. Quirino. The act stated that the municipality of Baroy would be separated from Tubod, and that parts of Kolambugan would be annexed to the two towns.

On January 13, 1960, the town of Salvador was separated from the town through Executive Order No. 370.

Baroy celebrates Lechon Festival every 10th day of June.

== Geography ==
Baroy is located about 69 kilometres (43 mi) south-west of Iligan City. Geographically, Baroy is bordered on the north by Panguil Bay and on the east by the Municipality of Tubod, on the south by the Municipality of Salvador, on the west by the Municipality of Lala.

Baroy has a total area of approximately 8,009.2935 hectares. The agricultural land is approximately 5,348.3994 hectares. Coco lands accounted to about 4,921.6994 hectares and the remaining 426.70 hectares are devoted to rice production. Of said rice lands, 251.2 hectares are irrigated while 175.50 hectares are rainfed area.

=== Barangays ===
Baroy is politically subdivided into 23 barangays. Each barangay consists of puroks while some have sitios.

- Andil
- Bagong Dawis
- Baroy Daku
- Bato
- Cabasagan
- Dalama
- Libertad
- Limwag
- Lindongan
- Maliwanag
- Manan-ao
- Pange
- Pindolonan
- Poblacion
- Princesa
- Rawan Point
- Riverside
- Sagadan (Sagadan Lower)
- Salong
- Tinubdan
- Sagadan Upper
- San Juan
- Village

=== Climate ===
Climate data for Baroy, Lanao del Norte
Month	Jan	Feb	Mar	Apr	May	Jun	Jul	Aug	Sep	Oct	Nov	Dec	Year
Mean daily maximum °C (°F)	29 (84)	30 (86)	31 (88)	31 (88)	30 (86)	30 (86)	29 (84)	30 (86)	30 (86)	30 (86)	30 (86)	30 (86)	30 (86)
Mean daily minimum °C (°F)	22 (72)	22 (72)	22 (72)	23 (73)	24 (75)	24 (75)	24 (75)	24 (75)	24 (75)	24 (75)	23 (73)	23 (73)	23 (74)
Average precipitation mm (inches)	69 (2.7)	58 (2.3)	67 (2.6)	60 (2.4)	109 (4.3)	114 (4.5)	83 (3.3)	78 (3.1)	76 (3.0)	92 (3.6)	86 (3.4)	63 (2.5)	955 (37.7)
Average rainy days	12.8	11.6	14.8	17.4	24.8	23.5	20.7	18.5	17.4	22.5	21.6	15.6	221.2
Source: Meteoblue

== Demographics ==
Population census of Baroy
Year	Pop.	±% p.a.
1960	11,925	—
1970	11,076	−0.73%
1975	12,995	+3.26%
1980	14,078	+1.61%
1990	18,897	+2.99%
1995	21,353	+2.32%
2000	20,392	−0.98%
2007	21,430	+0.69%
2010	20,948	−0.82%
2015	22,600	+1.46%
2020	24,683	+1.87%
2024	24,763	+0.08%
Source: Philippine Statistics Authority

== Economy ==
Poverty incidence of Baroy

Source: Philippine Statistics Authority

The economy of Baroy is derived mainly from small establishments and agriculture.

1st Valley Bank, a rural bank with a number of branches in Mindanao, have their headquarters in Baroy. A branch of MLhuillier is also situated in the town.

== Tourism ==
- San Juan Port - it was an active port during the early times but today, it serves as a hang out place for the people of Baroy. It is very crowded during December 1 when Tangub city opens their Christmas decorations and puts up fireworks which can be seen fully in the port. Every Saturday evening if the weather permits, a live acoustic band is played.
- Limuag Falls located at the part of Limug.
- Baroy Municipal Tourism Plaza - includes the Santo Niño Parish Church, Municipal hall, Rizal park, tennis and basketball court.
- Horizon Resort Splash away Waterpark, the most visited main attraction of the town

== Healthcare ==
The town is served by the Lanao del Norte Provincial Hospital. The hospital also serves the nearby towns. The hospital is not yet developed fully.

There are also many health centers in the town. The main Health center is in poblacion near the municipal hall.

== Education ==
Lanao del Norte National Comprehensive High School (which also serves the nearby towns) in Barangay Santo Niño Village and Diosdado Yap Sr. National High School in Barangay Dalama are the only secondary schools in the town. There is also a private school which is known as Santo Niño Academy which was founded by Rev. Fr. John Patrick Meaney.

There are also few elementary schools. One is the Baroy Central Elementary School situated in Poblacion.
