= Lanao del Norte's 2nd congressional district =

Legislative district of the Philippines

- Constituency for the House of Representatives of the Philippines
- Location of Lanao del Norte within the Philippines
- Province: Lanao del Norte
- Region: Northern Mindanao
- Population: 401,804 (2020)
- Electorate: 210,936 (2022)
- Major settlements: 11 LGUs: Municipalities; Kapatagan; Lala; Magsaysay; Munai; Nunungan; Pantao Ragat; Poona Piagapo; Salvador; Sapad; Sultan Naga Dimaporo; Tangcal
- Area: 2,253.75 km^{2} (870.18 sq mi)

Current constituency
- Created: 1987
- Representative: Sittie Aminah Dimaporo
- Political party: Lakas–CMD
- Congressional bloc: Majority

Lanao del Norte's 2nd congressional district is a congressional district in the province of Lanao del Norte that has been used in the House of Representatives of the Philippines since 1987. The district's boundaries have only been redrawn once, originally consisting of fifteen southern and interior municipalities, three of which bordered Panguil Bay and Moro Gulf, which were reduced to eleven municipalities following a reapportionment in November 2009. The district is currently represented in the 20th Congress by Sittie Aminah Q. Dimaporo of the Lakas–CMD.

== Representation history ==
#	Image	Member	Term of office		Congress	Party	Electoral history	Constituent LGUs
#	Image	Member	Start	End	Congress	Party	Electoral history	Constituent LGUs
=== Lanao del Norte's 2nd district for the House of Representatives of the Philippines ===
District created February 2, 1987 from Lanao del Norte's at-large district.
1		Abdullah D. Dimaporo	June 30, 1987	December 27, 1989	8th	Independent	Elected in 1987. Resigned to run for ARMM governor.	1987–1992; Balo-i, Kapatagan, Karomatan, Lala, Magsaysay, Matungao, Munai, Nunungan, Pantao Ragat, Pantar, Poona Piagapo, Salvador, Sapad, Tagoloan, Tangcal
1		Abdullah D. Dimaporo	June 30, 1987	December 27, 1989	8th	KBL	Elected in 1987. Resigned to run for ARMM governor.	1987–1992; Balo-i, Kapatagan, Karomatan, Lala, Magsaysay, Matungao, Munai, Nunungan, Pantao Ragat, Pantar, Poona Piagapo, Salvador, Sapad, Tagoloan, Tangcal
—	vacant		December 27, 1989	June 30, 1992	–	No special election held to fill vacancy.		1987–1992; Balo-i, Kapatagan, Karomatan, Lala, Magsaysay, Matungao, Munai, Nunungan, Pantao Ragat, Pantar, Poona Piagapo, Salvador, Sapad, Tagoloan, Tangcal
2		Macabangkit B. Lanto	June 30, 1992	October 5, 1994	9th	Lakas	Elected in 1992. Election annulled by House electoral tribunal after an election protest.	1992–2010; Balo-i, Kapatagan, Lala, Magsaysay, Matungao, Munai, Nunungan, Pantao Ragat, Pantar, Poona Piagapo, Salvador, Sapad, Sultan Naga Dimaporo, Tagoloan, Tangcal
3		Mario E. Hisuler	October 5, 1994	June 30, 1995	9th	Lakas	Declared winner of 1992 elections.	1992–2010; Balo-i, Kapatagan, Lala, Magsaysay, Matungao, Munai, Nunungan, Pantao Ragat, Pantar, Poona Piagapo, Salvador, Sapad, Sultan Naga Dimaporo, Tagoloan, Tangcal
4		Abdullah S. Mangotara	June 30, 1995	June 30, 2001	10th	Lakas	Elected in 1995.	1992–2010; Balo-i, Kapatagan, Lala, Magsaysay, Matungao, Munai, Nunungan, Pantao Ragat, Pantar, Poona Piagapo, Salvador, Sapad, Sultan Naga Dimaporo, Tagoloan, Tangcal
4		Abdullah S. Mangotara	June 30, 1995	June 30, 2001	11th	Lakas	Re-elected in 1998.	1992–2010; Balo-i, Kapatagan, Lala, Magsaysay, Matungao, Munai, Nunungan, Pantao Ragat, Pantar, Poona Piagapo, Salvador, Sapad, Sultan Naga Dimaporo, Tagoloan, Tangcal
(1)		Abdullah D. Dimaporo	June 30, 2001	June 30, 2010	12th	Lakas	Elected in 2001.	1992–2010; Balo-i, Kapatagan, Lala, Magsaysay, Matungao, Munai, Nunungan, Pantao Ragat, Pantar, Poona Piagapo, Salvador, Sapad, Sultan Naga Dimaporo, Tagoloan, Tangcal
(1)		Abdullah D. Dimaporo	June 30, 2001	June 30, 2010	13th	Lakas	Re-elected in 2004.	1992–2010; Balo-i, Kapatagan, Lala, Magsaysay, Matungao, Munai, Nunungan, Pantao Ragat, Pantar, Poona Piagapo, Salvador, Sapad, Sultan Naga Dimaporo, Tagoloan, Tangcal
(1)		Abdullah D. Dimaporo	June 30, 2001	June 30, 2010	14th	Lakas	Re-elected in 2007.	1992–2010; Balo-i, Kapatagan, Lala, Magsaysay, Matungao, Munai, Nunungan, Pantao Ragat, Pantar, Poona Piagapo, Salvador, Sapad, Sultan Naga Dimaporo, Tagoloan, Tangcal
5		Fatima Aliah Q. Dimaporo	June 30, 2010	June 30, 2013	15th	NPC	Elected in 2010.	2010–present Kapatagan, Lala, Magsaysay, Munai, Nunungan, Pantao Ragat, Poona Piagapo, Salvador, Sapad, Sultan Naga Dimaporo, Tangcal
(1)		Abdullah D. Dimaporo	June 30, 2013	June 30, 2022	16th	NPC	Elected in 2013.	2010–present Kapatagan, Lala, Magsaysay, Munai, Nunungan, Pantao Ragat, Poona Piagapo, Salvador, Sapad, Sultan Naga Dimaporo, Tangcal
(1)		Abdullah D. Dimaporo	June 30, 2013	June 30, 2022	17th	NPC	Re-elected in 2016.	2010–present Kapatagan, Lala, Magsaysay, Munai, Nunungan, Pantao Ragat, Poona Piagapo, Salvador, Sapad, Sultan Naga Dimaporo, Tangcal
(1)		Abdullah D. Dimaporo	June 30, 2013	June 30, 2022	18th	NPC	Re-elected in 2019.	2010–present Kapatagan, Lala, Magsaysay, Munai, Nunungan, Pantao Ragat, Poona Piagapo, Salvador, Sapad, Sultan Naga Dimaporo, Tangcal
5		Sittie Aminah Q. Dimaporo	June 30, 2022	Incumbent	19th	Lakas	Elected in 2022.	2010–present Kapatagan, Lala, Magsaysay, Munai, Nunungan, Pantao Ragat, Poona Piagapo, Salvador, Sapad, Sultan Naga Dimaporo, Tangcal

== Election results ==
=== 2025 ===
Candidate	Party	Votes	%
Aminah Dimaporo (incumbent)	Lakas–CMD	142,181	89.10
Nagamura Moner	United Nationalist Alliance	17,387	10.90
Total		159,568	100.00
Valid votes		159,568	89.31
Invalid/blank votes		19,107	10.69
Total votes		178,675	100.00
Registered voters/turnout		206,724	86.43
Lakas–CMD hold			
Source: Commission on Elections

=== 2022 ===
Candidate	Party	Votes	%
Aminah Dimaporo	Lakas–CMD	138,910	91.14
Jose Patalinghug Jr.	Partido Federal ng Pilipinas	13,501	8.86
Total		152,411	100.00
Total votes		174,959	–
Registered voters/turnout		210,936	82.94
Lakas–CMD gain from Nationalist People's Coalition			
Source: Commission on Elections

=== 2016 ===
2016 Philippine House of Representatives elections
Party	Candidate	Votes	%
NPC	Abdullah Dimaporo	80,691	68.84%
UNA	Omar Usup	36,511	31.15%
Total votes		117,202	100.00%

=== 2013 ===
2013 Philippine House of Representatives elections
Party	Candidate	Votes	%	±%
Liberal	Acmad Omar			
NPC	Abdullah Dimaporo			
Margin of victory				
Rejected ballots				
Turnout				
NPC hold		Swing		

=== 2010 ===
Candidate	Party	Votes	%
Fatima Aliah Dimaporo	Lakas–Kampi–CMD	119,614	84.80
Tingagun Umpa	Liberal Party	21,442	15.20
Total		141,056	100.00
Valid votes		141,056	92.61
Invalid/blank votes		11,250	7.39
Total votes		152,306	100.00
Lakas–Kampi–CMD hold			
Source: Commission on Elections

== See also ==
- Legislative districts of Lanao del Norte
