= Nunungan =

Municipality in Lanao del Norte, Philippines

Nunungan نونونجان
- Municipality
- Municipality of Nunungan
- Seal

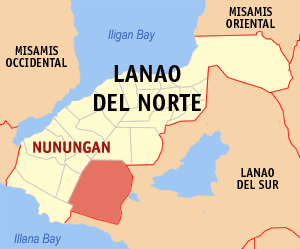
- Map of Lanao del Norte with Nunungan highlighted
- OpenStreetMap
- Location within the Philippines
- Coordinates: 7°47′18″N 123°54′32″E
- Country: Philippines
- Region: Northern Mindanao
- Province: Lanao del Norte
- District: 2nd district
- Founded: July 1, 1968
- Barangays: 25 (see Barangays)

Government
  - Type: Sangguniang Bayan
  - Mayor: Marcos M. Mamay
  - Vice Mayor: Jun R. Cawasa
  - Representative: Sittie Aminah Q. Dimaporo
  - Municipal Council: Members: H. Abdullah M. Pamanay; Amer M. Ampatua; Maasiral M. Dampa; Noria E. Alamada; Mosakali D. Mamantuc; Mahalya T. Macatanong; Elias U. Ali; Nur-Amin D. Sanayon
  - Electorate: 9,861 voters (2025)

Area
  - Total: 473.28 km^{2} (182.73 sq mi)
- Elevation: 638 m (2,093 ft)
- Highest elevation: 1,525 m (5,003 ft)
- Lowest elevation: 86 m (282 ft)

Population (2024 census)
  - Total: 19,036
  - Density: 40.221/km^{2} (104.17/sq mi)
  - Households: 4,070

Economy
  - Income class: 1st municipal income class
  - Poverty incidence: 50.32% (2023)
  - Revenue: ₱ 212.8 million (2024)
  - Assets: ₱ 507.5 million (2024)
  - Expenditure: ₱ 196.3 million (2024)
  - Liabilities: ₱ 147.7 million (2024)

Service provider
  - Electricity: Lanao del Norte Electric Cooperative (LANECO)
- Time zone: UTC+8 (PST)
- ZIP code: 9216
- PSGC: 1003515000
- IDD : area code: +63 (0)63
- Native languages: Maranao; Cebuano; Binukid; Tagalog
- Major religions: Islam
- Website: www.nununganldn.gov.ph

Nunungan, officially the Municipality of Nunungan (Maranao: Inged a Nunungan; Cebuano: Lungsod sa Nunungan; Tagalog: Bayan ng Nunungan), is a municipality situated in the province of Lanao del Norte, Philippines. Nunungan is one of the eleven (11) municipalities represented by the second congressional district of Lanao del Norte in the Philippine Congress.

== General Information ==
=== Geography ===
Nunungan, or Nonongen (Anonongun same Ladugun in the M'ranaw version), is the largest municipality in Lanao del Norte in terms of land area. It shares borders with the municipalities of Sultan Naga Dimaporo, Sapad, Salvador, and Tangcal, all in Lanao del Norte, and the municipalities of Picong, Calanogas, Pualas, and Madamba, all in Lanao del Sur. Its valley landform makes it a hinterland municipality and contributes to its cold and humid environment. The municipality has the highest elevation in the province above sea level, with Mount Inayawan as its highest peak.

=== Barangays ===
Nunungan is politically subdivided into 25 barangays. Each barangay consists of puroks while some have sitios.

- Abaga
- Bangco
- Cabasaran (Laya)
- Canibongan
- Dimayon
- Inayawan
- Kaludan
- Karcum
- Katubuan
- Liangan
- Lupitan
- Malaig
- Mangun
- Masibay
- Notongan
- Panganapan
- Pantar
- Paridi
- Petadun
- Poblacion
- Rarab
- Raraban
- Rebucon
- Songgod
- Taraka

=== Demographics ===
The population of Nunungan has been gradually increasing based on the statistics provided by the Philippine Statistics Authority. The majority of its population embrace Islam as their religion, and the natives of Nunungan are called Inununganen.

Population census of Nunungan
Year	Pop.	±% p.a.
1918	1,928	—
1939	2,342	+0.93%
1948	3,736	+5.33%
1960	5,568	+3.38%
1970	3,863	−3.59%
1975	7,244	+13.44%
1980	6,430	−2.35%
1990	9,631	+4.12%
1995	10,763	+2.10%
2000	12,205	+2.73%
2007	13,999	+1.91%
2010	16,304	+5.70%
2015	18,367	+2.30%
2020	18,827	+0.52%
2024	19,036	+0.27%
Source: Philippine Statistics Authority

=== Economy ===
Agriculture and tourism are the main contributors to the local economy of Nunungan. Its main agricultural products are rice, coconut, and palm oil. The local government of Nunungan actively engages with different agricultural associations and cooperatives in the municipality in aims to develop various projects and programs and enhance the overall productivity of the agricultural sector of the town.

Poverty incidence of Nunungan (%)

Source: Philippine Statistics Authority

Nunungan is also abundant with different natural tourist attractions; most notable is the Mount Inayawan Range Natural Park, where people from nearby towns and provinces flock to Nunungan to see its majestic scenery and beauty. In 2023, the biodiversity-rich Mount Inayawan Range Natural Park was officially launched as an ASEAN Heritage Park (AHP) in ceremonies held during the 64th Araw ng Lanao del Norte-Environment Day celebration.

In 2017, the Philippine government allocated Nine Hundred Million Pesos (PHP 900,000,000.00) for the concreting of the National Road (Circumferential Road), connecting the municipalities of Sapad, Nunungan, and Sultan Naga Dimaporo. The said project was completed in 2018, which significantly improved the overall economy of Lanao del Norte, especially the Municipality of Nunungan, which for centuries struggled with stone and mud roads.

In 2022, a groundbreaking ceremony was held in the municipal grounds of Nunungan for an electrification project that will bring electricity to eleven (11) barangays of the town. The Forty-Three Million Pesos (PHP 43,000,000.00) project will lay out electricity lines from Barangay Baning of the adjacent Municipality of Sapad to the eleven (11) barangays of Nunungan, namely Masibay, Paridi, Abaga, Katubuan, Petadun, Poblacion, Raraban, Inayawan, Songgod, Malaig, and Pantar. This project enhances the economy of Nunungan as local and international investors expressed their interest in Nunungan for possible investments and business affairs after the project will be successfully implemented.

In 2023, the Department of Finance issued Department Order No. 074-2024, which reclassified the Municipality of Nunungan from a 3rd income class to a 1st income class municipality, pursuant to Section 6 of Republic Act No. 11964. This historical event marks a significant milestone in the economic progress of Nunungan.

=== Climate ===
Nunungan is also called in Lanao del Norte as the "Little Baguio" for its cold temperature, just like Baguio City. Nunungan has a valley landform and is elevated 638 m (2,093 ft.) above sea level, resulting in its cold and humid environment.

Climate data for Nunungan, Lanao del Norte
Month	Jan	Feb	Mar	Apr	May	Jun	Jul	Aug	Sep	Oct	Nov	Dec	Year
Mean daily maximum °C (°F)	24 (75)	24 (75)	25 (77)	26 (79)	25 (77)	24 (75)	24 (75)	24 (75)	25 (77)	24 (75)	24 (75)	24 (75)	24 (76)
Mean daily minimum °C (°F)	17 (63)	17 (63)	17 (63)	18 (64)	19 (66)	19 (66)	18 (64)	18 (64)	18 (64)	18 (64)	18 (64)	17 (63)	18 (64)
Average precipitation mm (inches)	69 (2.7)	58 (2.3)	67 (2.6)	60 (2.4)	109 (4.3)	114 (4.5)	83 (3.3)	78 (3.1)	76 (3.0)	92 (3.6)	86 (3.4)	63 (2.5)	955 (37.7)
Average rainy days	12.8	11.6	14.8	17.4	24.8	23.5	20.7	18.5	17.4	22.5	21.6	15.6	221.2
Source: Meteoblue

== Official seal ==
The Official Seal of Nunungan

The official seal of Nunungan represents its geography, culture, and people. It is composed of the following:

The Mountain - represents Mount Inayawan as the pride of Nunungan.

The three (3) lakes - represents the three large lakes of Nunungan.

The crescent moon and star - symbolizes Islam as the main religion of Nunungan.

== Local politics and governance ==
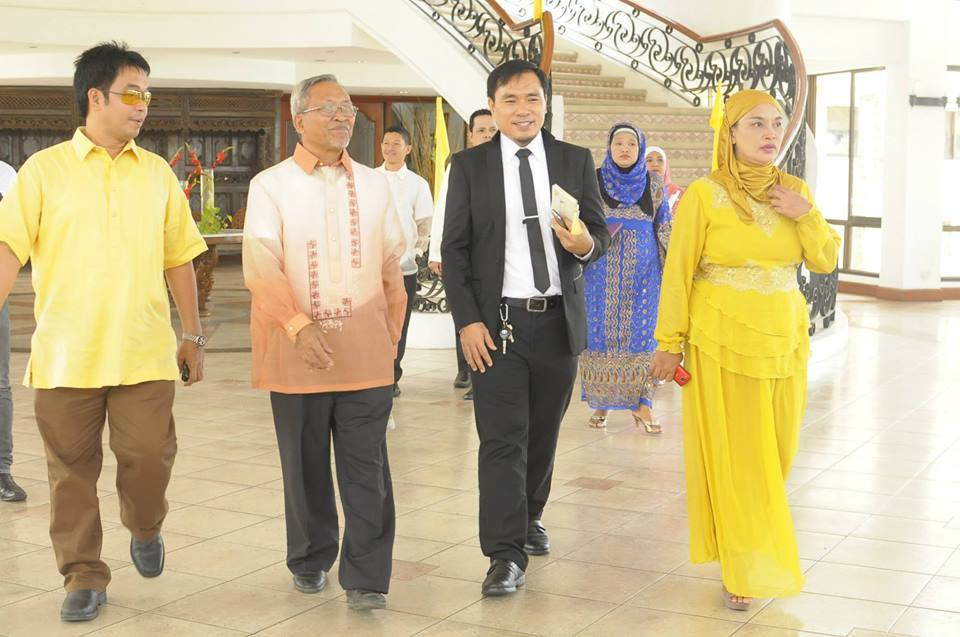
(From left to right) Former Mayor Aminoddin Manamparan, Vice Mayor Atty. Abdul Malik Manamparan, and Mayoralty Candidate Marcos Mamay during a wedding held in 2015.

Nunungan was dominated by the Alando clan of Barangay Katubuan during the rule of President Ferdinand Marcos Sr. Mayor Ayaon Alando was proclaimed as the first municipal mayor of the newly declared Municipality of Nunungan in 1968. He was then followed by his son, Mayor Samo Alando, before being replaced by the Manamparans of Barangay Petadun. After the 1986 People Power Revolution, Atty. Abdul Malik Manamparan was proclaimed OIC Mayor of Nunungan by President Corazon Aquino, which marked the end of the Alando rule and the beginning of the Manamparans' rule in Nunungan. In 2001, the Manamparans' rule was temporarily halted when then Mayor-Elect Jun Cawasa of Barangay Katubuan won against the Manamparans, who at that time had two mayoralty candidates: then Vice Mayor Abdul Malik Manamparan and his son, then Mayor Aminoddin Manamparan. The Manamparans appealed and petitioned to the COMELEC to revoke the 2001 election results in Nunungan since there were four precincts that were unable to conduct elections. A special election was held in October 2001 for the four precincts, resulting in the victory and comeback of the Manamparans. In 2016, the tandem of incumbents Mayor Marcos Mamay of Barangay Masibay and Vice Mayor Jun Cawasa won in a close election against the tandem of then Vice Mayor Abdul Malik Manamparan for mayor and his son, then Mayor Abdul C. Manamparan II for vice mayor, ending the 30-year rule of the Manamparans in Nunungan.

=== Local officials after 1986 People Power Revolution ===
Term	Municipal Mayors	Municipal Vice Mayors
1986 - 1992	Atty. Abdul Malik M. Manamparan	
1992 - 1995	Atty. Abdul Malik M. Manamparan	
1995 - 1998	Atty. Abdul Malik M. Manamparan	
1998 - 2001	Aminoddin C. Manamparan	Atty. Abdul Malik M. Manamparan
2001 - 2004	Jun R. Cawasa (June to October, 2001) Atty. Abdul Malik M. Manamparan	
2004 - 2007	Atty. Abdul Malik M. Manamparan	H. Amer Mangondawis Manamparan
2007 - 2010	Atty. Abdul Malik M. Manamparan	
2010 - 2013	Atty. Abdul Malik M. Manamparan	Lomala G. Sanayon
2013 - 2016	Abdul C. Manamparan II	Atty. Abdul Malik M. Manamparan
2016 - 2019	Marcos M. Mamay, MPA	Jun R. Cawasa
2019 - 2022	Marcos M. Mamay, MPA	Jun R. Cawasa
2022 - 2025	Marcos M. Mamay, MPA	Jun R. Cawasa
2025 - 2028	Alliah B. Mamay - Omar	Marcos M. Mamay, MPA
