= Lala, Lanao del Norte =

Municipality in Lanao del Norte, Philippines

Lala
- Municipality
- Municipality of Lala
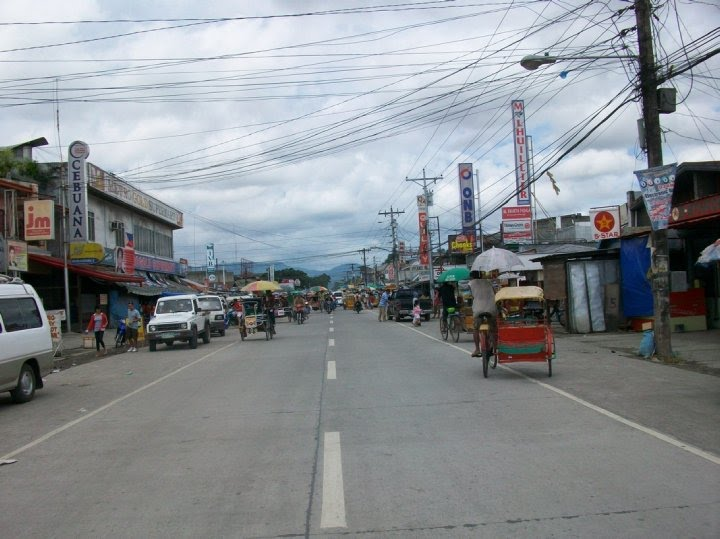
- Barangay Maranding in Lala

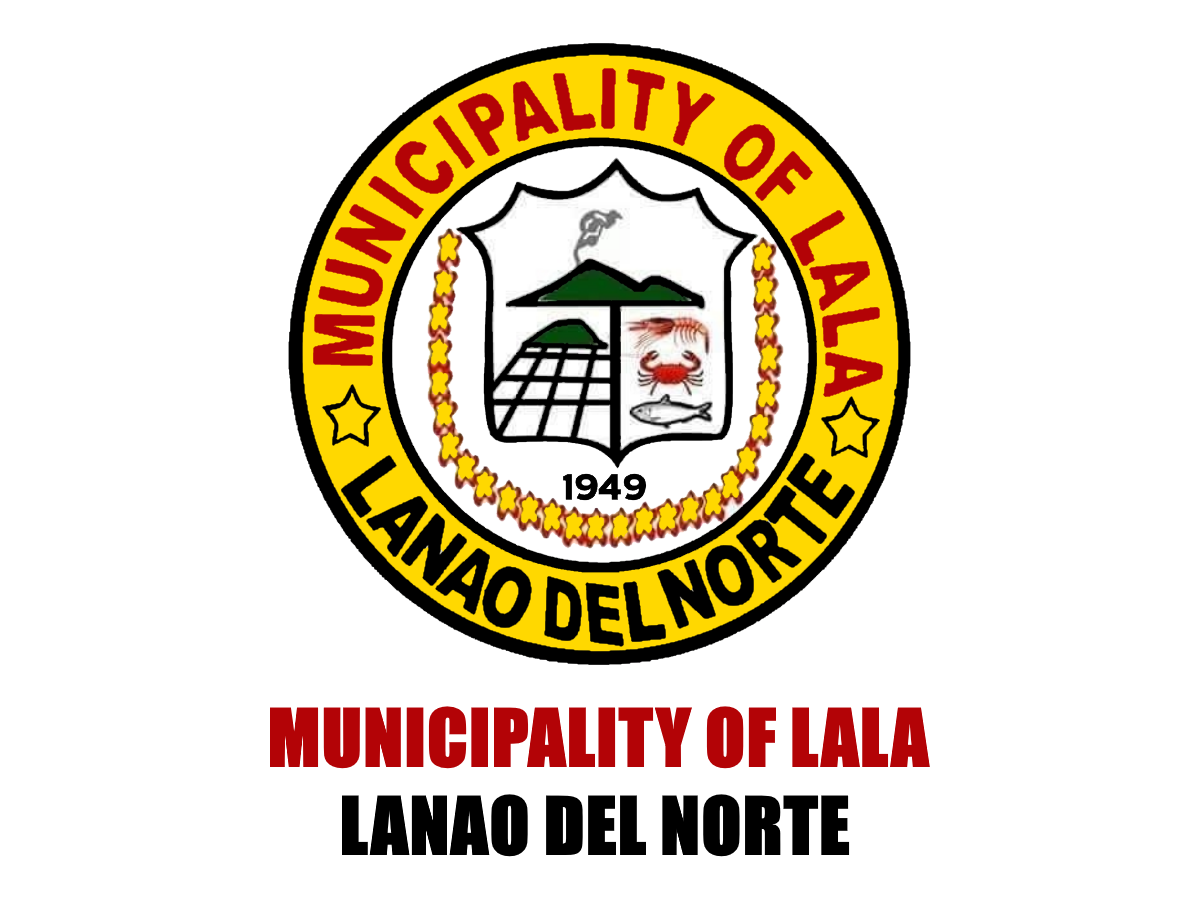
- Flag Seal

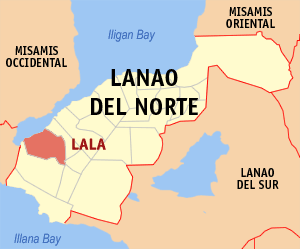
- Map of Lanao del Norte with Lala highlighted
- Interactive map of Lala
- Location within the Philippines
- Coordinates: 7°58′25″N 123°44′47″E
- Country: Philippines
- Region: Northern Mindanao
- Province: Lanao del Norte
- District: 2nd district
- Founded: March 22, 1949
- Barangays: 27 (see Barangays)

Government
  - Type: Sangguniang Bayan
  - Mayor: Angel L. Yap
  - Vice Mayor: Cesar Q. Yap Jr
  - Representative: Sittie Aminah Q. Dimaporo
  - Municipal Council: Members: Ben Bryan R. Bontilao; Ralph C. Lim; Ma. Kristine C. Romo; Rone D. Dejarme; Leah L. Yap; Lyndon L. Abucay; Dick A. Salimbangon; Marites G. Procianos
  - Electorate: 48,444 voters (2025)

Area
  - Total: 140.25 km^{2} (54.15 sq mi)
- Elevation: 6.0 m (19.7 ft)
- Highest elevation: 65 m (213 ft)
- Lowest elevation: −2 m (−6.6 ft)

Population (2024 census)
  - Total: 75,015
  - Density: 534.87/km^{2} (1,385.3/sq mi)
  - Households: 17,873

Economy
  - Income class: 1st municipal income class
  - Poverty incidence: 27.22% (2023)
  - Revenue: ₱ 322.9 million (2024)
  - Assets: ₱ 863.8 million (2024)
  - Expenditure: ₱ 268.3 million (2024)
  - Liabilities: ₱ 143.3 million (2024)

Service provider
  - Electricity: Lanao del Norte Electric Cooperative (LANECO)
- Time zone: UTC+8 (PST)
- ZIP code: 9211
- PSGC: 1003509000
- IDD : area code: +63 (0)63
- Native languages: Maranao; Cebuano; Binukid; Tagalog
- Website: lalaldn.gov.ph

Lala, officially the Municipality of Lala (Cebuano: Lungsod sa Lala; Maranao: Inged a Lala; Tagalog: Bayan ng Lala), is a municipality in the province of Lanao del Norte, Philippines. According to the 2024 census, it has a population of 75,015 people.

The town is famous for its specialized crab dishes and its Alimango festival, which is dedicated to its crab produce.

== History ==
Before American colonization, Lala was formerly a part of the State of Unayan, Confederate States of Lanao based from ancient boundaries.

Lala was created from Tubod through Executive Order No. 208 signed by President Elpidio Quirino on March 22, 1949.

== Geography ==
The Municipality of Lala is geographically situated in a vast plain within the Kapatagan Valley, with the area of 140.25 square kilometres (54.15 sq mi) along the coast of Panguil Bay. It is located about 14 kilometres (8.7 mi) from the municipality of Tubod, the seat of the provincial government, and 67.5 kilometres (41.9 mi) south-west of Iligan City, the commercial center of the province. It is geographically bounded on the north-west by Panguil Bay, on the north-east by the municipality of Baroy, on the south by the municipality of Kapatagan and on the east by the municipality of Salvador.

=== Barangays ===
Lala is politically subdivided into 27 barangays. Each barangay consists of puroks while some have sitios.

- Abaga
- Andil
- Cabasagan
- Camalan
- Darumawang Bucana
- Darumawang Ilaya
- El Salvador
- Gumagamot
- Lala Proper
- Lanipao
- Magpatao
- Maranding
- Matampay Bucana
- Matampay Ilaya
- Pacita
- Pendolonan
- Pinoyak
- Raw-an
- Rebe
- San Isidro Lower
- San Isidro Upper
- San Manuel
- Santa Cruz Lower
- Santa Cruz Upper
- Simpak
- Tenazas
- Tuna-an

=== Climate ===
Climate data for Lala, Lanao del Norte
Month	Jan	Feb	Mar	Apr	May	Jun	Jul	Aug	Sep	Oct	Nov	Dec	Year
Mean daily maximum °C (°F)	29 (84)	30 (86)	31 (88)	31 (88)	30 (86)	30 (86)	29 (84)	30 (86)	30 (86)	30 (86)	30 (86)	29 (84)	30 (86)
Mean daily minimum °C (°F)	22 (72)	22 (72)	22 (72)	23 (73)	24 (75)	24 (75)	24 (75)	24 (75)	24 (75)	24 (75)	23 (73)	23 (73)	23 (74)
Average precipitation mm (inches)	69 (2.7)	58 (2.3)	67 (2.6)	60 (2.4)	109 (4.3)	114 (4.5)	83 (3.3)	78 (3.1)	76 (3.0)	92 (3.6)	86 (3.4)	63 (2.5)	955 (37.7)
Average rainy days	12.8	11.6	14.8	17.4	24.8	23.5	20.7	18.5	17.4	22.5	21.6	15.6	221.2
Source: Meteoblue

== Demographics ==
Population census of Lala
Year	Pop.	±% p.a.
1960	30,468	—
1970	22,544	−2.96%
1975	26,083	+2.97%
1980	35,115	+6.13%
1990	50,100	+3.62%
1995	55,888	+2.07%
2000	56,447	+0.21%
2007	58,395	+0.47%
2010	65,355	+4.18%
2015	67,727	+0.68%
2020	73,425	+1.71%
2024	75,015	+0.52%
Source: Philippine Statistics Authority

== Economy ==
Poverty incidence of Lala (%)

Source: Philippine Statistics Authority
