= Tangcal =

Municipality in Lanao del Norte, Philippines

Tangcal تانجكال
- Municipality
- Municipality of Tangcal
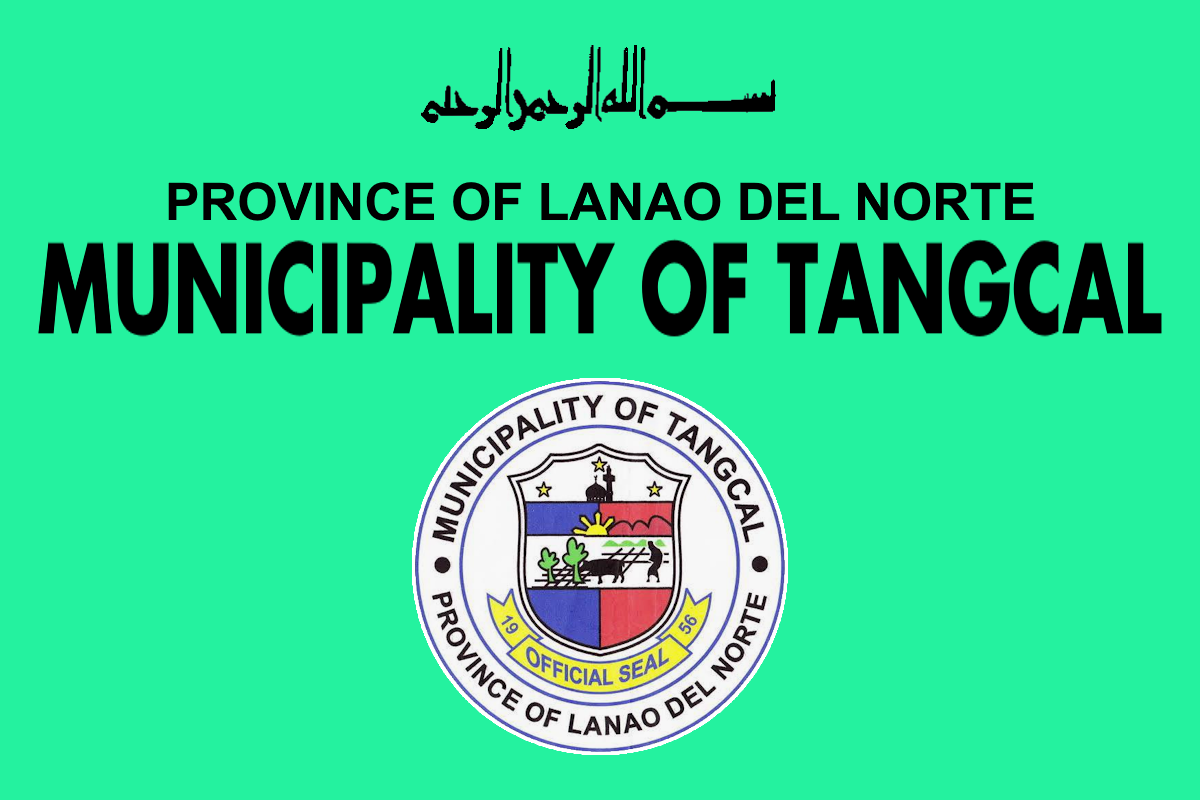
- Flag Seal

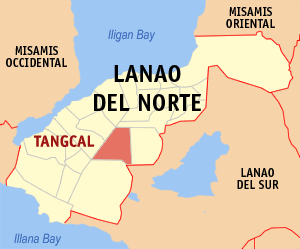
- Map of Lanao del Norte with Tangcal highlighted
- Interactive map of Tangcal
- Location within the Philippines
- Coordinates: 8°02′47″N 123°56′36″E
- Country: Philippines
- Region: Northern Mindanao
- Province: Lanao del Norte
- District: 2nd district
- Founded: June 16, 1956
- Barangays: 18 (see Barangays)

Government
  - Type: Sangguniang Bayan
  - Mayor: Sittie Aisah M. Tomawis
  - Vice Mayor: Fatima M. Tomawis
  - Representative: Sittie Aminah Q. Dimaporo
  - Municipal Council: Members: Saidali S. Diragon; Salamat L. Mauyag; Aminollah M. Mostari; Elias M. Tondia; Norania L. Gagaso; Jonaid M. Liawao; Moda S. Dital; Masoud A. Batingolo
  - Electorate: 7,004 voters (2025)

Area
  - Total: 178.62 km^{2} (68.97 sq mi)
- Elevation: 652 m (2,139 ft)
- Highest elevation: 1,157 m (3,796 ft)
- Lowest elevation: 291 m (955 ft)

Population (2024 census)
  - Total: 17,247
  - Density: 96.557/km^{2} (250.08/sq mi)
  - Households: 2,884

Economy
  - Income class: 4th municipal income class
  - Poverty incidence: 58.32% (2023)
  - Revenue: ₱ 131.3 million (2024)
  - Assets: ₱ 275.6 million (2024)
  - Expenditure: ₱ 111 million (2024)
  - Liabilities: ₱ 45.75 million (2024)

Service provider
  - Electricity: Lanao del Norte Electric Cooperative (LANECO)
- Time zone: UTC+8 (PST)
- ZIP code: 9220
- PSGC: 1003521000
- IDD : area code: +63 (0)63
- Native languages: Maranao; Cebuano; Binukid; Tagalog
- Major religions: Islam
- Website: www.tangkal.gov.ph

Tangcal, officially the Municipality of Tangcal (Maranao: Inged a Tangcal; Cebuano: Lungsod sa Tangcal; Tagalog: Bayan ng Tangcal), is a municipality in the province of Lanao del Norte, Philippines. According to the 2024 census, it has a population of 17,247 people.

It is also pronounced as Tangkal.

== Geography ==
It is located about 51 kilometers in the southwest of Iligan City, the commercial center of Lanao del Norte. Geographically, Tangcal is bounded by the municipalities of Tubod, Magsaysay and Maigo on the north, Munai on the east, Nunungan on the south, and Magsaysay on the west.

=== Barangays ===
Tangcal is politically subdivided into 18 barangays. Each barangay consists of puroks while some have sitios.

- Bayabao
- Berwar
- Big Banisilon
- Big Meladoc
- Bubong
- Lamaosa
- Linao
- Lindongan
- Lingco-an
- Papan
- Pelingkingan
- Poblacion
- Poona Kapatagan
- Punod
- Small Banisilon
- Small Meladoc
- Somiorang
- Tangcal Proper

=== Climate ===
Climate data for Tangcal, Lanao del Norte
Month	Jan	Feb	Mar	Apr	May	Jun	Jul	Aug	Sep	Oct	Nov	Dec	Year
Mean daily maximum °C (°F)	25 (77)	26 (79)	26 (79)	27 (81)	27 (81)	27 (81)	26 (79)	26 (79)	27 (81)	26 (79)	26 (79)	26 (79)	26 (80)
Mean daily minimum °C (°F)	21 (70)	21 (70)	21 (70)	22 (72)	22 (72)	22 (72)	22 (72)	21 (70)	22 (72)	22 (72)	22 (72)	21 (70)	22 (71)
Average precipitation mm (inches)	159 (6.3)	143 (5.6)	166 (6.5)	183 (7.2)	357 (14.1)	414 (16.3)	333 (13.1)	309 (12.2)	289 (11.4)	285 (11.2)	253 (10.0)	166 (6.5)	3,057 (120.4)
Average rainy days	18.4	17.2	20.6	23.4	29.3	29.2	29.9	29.4	27.7	28.7	25.5	19.9	299.2
Source: Meteoblue

== History ==
In 1956, the barangays of Tangcal, Berowar, Pangao, Tawinian, Lumbac, Lawigadato, Somyorang, Bayabao, Pilingkingan, Ramain, Bagigicon, Lamaosa, Meladoc Big, Meladoc Small and Rarab, then part of Kolambugan, were constituted into the municipal district of Tangcal. Later on, some barangays of the municipality of Munai were also consolidated. Coconut and corn were the main agricultural products of the town.

=== Maranao Traditional Government ===
- Sultan of Bayabao is the highest traditional position in municipality of Munai and municipality of Tangcal. Sultan of Bayabao term was originally and honorary given by the Sultan of Bayabao in Ramain, Lanao del Sur to the old-old Datus before as sign of friendship according to the folk story. The name barangay Bayabao is in the municipality. Ramain was one of the original governors using Sultan traditional government.
- Sultan of Kapatagan is the key figure and state man being the traditional historian of all the families living in Munai and Tangcal
- Sultan of Adel a Maamor
- Sultan of Linao
- Sultan of Punud
- Sultan of Tangcal Proper
- Sultan of Beruar

=== Tribal leader who fought against American invasion ===
Datu Mayoma was one of the Moro tribe who held and fight the American soldiers at the time of American invasion. His remain is in Barangay Linao where he holds and fight with American troops. During the American escalation the lanao del Norte, Datu Mayoma had learned that the American troops were going direction to Tangcal, then he goes to the middle of mountain they called it now Barangay Linao to deck for his small Camp. Few days later, American troops are now reached barangay Linao where small Camp Datu Mayoma located and he is there alone and waiting them. According to the old elders story, Datu Mayoma made a traditional ceremonial first (Sagayan in maranao term) before he start to fight against American troops, however and on other hand, easy to the American troops to kill him since ceremonial takes almost an hour, for that when he starts to strike using his sword aiming to the American soldiers, on process they just fire at him because they are ready and watching.

=== Community Practice before Martial Law ===
Tangcal before was one of the very peaceful municipality in Lanao del Norte. Muslim (Maranao Tribe) and Non-Muslim (Christian) they live together as one Community. Most of the Muslim Male married with Christian Female, and their children are peacefully live together. There is Traders Market where Muslims from interior areas and Christians from urvan areas particular in Kolambugan exchange their goods and traditional items.

There was a Christian church build in Barangay Small Banisilon but it was destroyed during Martial Law. There was a schedule of Disco Club gatherings "Baylehan in bisaya term" where all young ladies and young gentlemen including their parents were they meet together just for exchange of cultural and social life. There was also a Contest Competition Program for Mister and Miss of Municipality of Tangcal.

=== Collecting of Land Tax ===
Majority people living in Tangcal were happy because of the simple living because they do not have any worry at all just can eat any food every day, but, they have panic when the land have taxes.

When then President Diosdao Macapagal signed the Land Reform Law to have tax from the Land. In Tangcal there are so many Land Lords but just few Land Lords could provide tax for their lands. On the first process of collecting taxes, sometimes the land lords give the livestock, food, crops just to pay their obligation, however and later soon, the landlords has divided their land to children's, close relatives do not have enough lands and even helpers and workers just to accommodate the paying of much land taxes.

== Demographics ==
Population census of Tangcal
Year	Pop.	±% p.a.
1960	5,338	—
1970	6,309	+1.68%
1975	12,140	+14.03%
1980	3,928	−20.20%
1990	4,439	+1.23%
1995	4,904	+1.88%
2000	6,117	+4.85%
2007	9,351	+6.03%
2010	12,588	+11.42%
2015	15,181	+3.63%
2020	16,075	+1.21%
2024	17,247	+1.70%
Source: Philippine Statistics Authority

Majority of people living in Tangcal are all Maranao tribe and they are supporters of MILF and MNLF. All the social life and justices are always refer to MILF and MNLF rules "Sharia Law"

== Economy ==
Poverty incidence of Tangcal (%)

Source: Philippine Statistics Authority

List of local products

- Corn
- Coconut
- Lumber
- Livestock
- Falcata
- Banana

== Government ==
Elected officials 2022–present:

- Municipal Mayor: Sittie Aisah Mutia Tomawis - Adiong
- Vice Mayor: Fatima Mangansan Mutia - Tomawis
- Sangguniang Bayan:
  - Saidali Diragon
  - Salamat Mauyag
  - Jonaid Liawao
  - Elias Tondia
  - Norania Gagaso
  - Aminollah Mostari
  - Moda Dital
  - Soud Batingolo
- ABC President: Abalos Mapandi Macondara
- SB Secretary: Mr. Camilo Batingulo

=== List of former executives ===
Mayors after People Power Revolution 1986:

- 1987 - 1989, OIC Mayor Fataq Mapandi
- 1989 - 1992, Mamalampac Mangansan Mutia
- 1992 - 1995, Mamalampac Mangansan Mutia
- 1995 - 1998, Mamalampac Mangansan Mutia
- 1998 - 2001, Alex Mapandi
- 2001 - 2004, Abdulaziz Mutia Batingolo
- 2004 - 2007, Abdulaziz Mutia Batingolo
- 2007 - 2010, Abdulaziz Mutia Batingolo
- 2010 - 2013, Aisha Batingolo
- 2013 - 2016, Fatima Mutia Tomawis
- 2016 -2022, Fatima Mutia Tomawis
- 2022 -present, Sittie Aisah Mutia Tomawis-Adiong

Vice Mayors after People Power Revolution 1986:

- 1987 - 1989, OIC Baraguir Diragon
- 1989 - 1992,
- 1992 - 1995, Usman
- 1995 - 1998, Solaiman Liawao
- 1998 - 2001, Kiram Mutia
- 2001 - 2004, Kiram Mutia
- 2004 - 2010, Mamintal Sedic
- 2013 - 2016, Dardagan Maliawao
- 2016 - 2022, Dardagan Maliawao
- 2022 -present, Fatima Mutia Tomawis

== Tourism ==
- Kendis River
- Piyamunitan River
- Titunod River
- Linao River
- Banisilon River
- Lindongan River

== Education ==
- Banisilon Elementary School
- Beruar Integrated School
- Big Banisilon Integrated School
- Pelingkingan Integrated School
- Somiorang Elementary School
- Tangkal Proper Elementary School
- Tangcal National High School
- Sultan Mimbisa Primary School
- Bayabao Primary School
- Sultan Lindongan Primary School
- Lingco-an Primary School
- Lamausa Primary School
