= 1st Valley Bank =

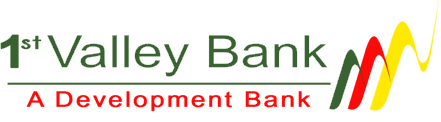
- Company type: Private
- Industry: Finance and insurance
- Founded: Kapatagan, Lanao del Norte, Philippines (1956; 70 years ago)
- Headquarters: 1VB Business Center, Vamenta Blvd. Cor. Lirio St. Carmen, Cagayan de Oro, Philippines
- Number of locations: 86 branches (2024); 60 ATMs (2024)
- Key people: Atty. Nicolas J. Lim (Chairman); Nicolette Lim-Gica, (president and CEO)
- Products: Financial services
- Total assets: ₱14.88 billion $260.68 million (31 March 2025)
- Number of employees: 789
- Website: www.1stvalleybank.com.ph

1st Valley Bank is a thrift bank in the Philippines, based in Cagayan de Oro City, Misamis Oriental and servicing various areas in Visayas and Mindanao.

The bank's primary clientele include small and medium enterprises and farmers in the communities served by it. Loans granted by the bank are primarily channeled to help finance the production of coconut, corn, rice and fish. The bank also provides capital and other banking services, as a co-partner of the Department of Agriculture, to small-scale commercial, industrial and agri-aqua business or diversified farming in line with the government's program in agricultural development to uplift the socio-economic welfare of the people. The bank has also a special loan program to accommodate salaried individuals and micro entrepreneurs.

== History ==
Former logo as a rural bank until 2013

1st Valley Bank was originally two banks: the Rural Bank of Kapatagan Valley and the Rural Bank of Sinacaban in Misamis Occidental.

The Rural Bank of Kapatagan Valley was incorporated on September 11, 1956, and was granted an authority to operate on November 24 of the same year, becoming the Philippines' seventy-fifth rural bank, initially starting with an initial capital of forty thousand pesos. It eventually became a member of the prestigious Rural Bankers Association of the Philippines on April 5, 1957.

On April 3, 2004, the stockholders of the Rural Bank of Kapatagan Valley approved the recommendation of its board of directors to consolidate with the Rural Bank of Sinacaban. On August 30, 2005, the Securities and Exchange Commission issued the consolidated bank's Certificate of Consolidation and the corresponding certificate of incorporation of the merged institution, by then known as 1st Valley Bank.

The Bangko Sentral ng Pilipinas granted 1st Valley Bank's authority to operate on September 21 of that year.

In 2007 the bank was one of several rural banks enabled with wireless ATMs.
