= Pantao Ragat =

Municipality in Lanao del Norte, Philippines

Pantao Ragat فانتاو راغات
- Municipality
- Municipality of Pantao Ragat
- Seal

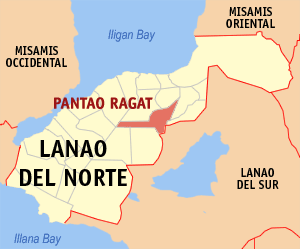
- Map of Lanao del Norte with Pantao Ragat highlighted
- Interactive map of Pantao Ragat
- Location within the Philippines
- Coordinates: 8°03′45″N 124°11′04″E
- Country: Philippines
- Region: Northern Mindanao
- Province: Lanao del Norte
- District: 2nd district
- Founded: June 1, 1966
- Barangays: 20 (see Barangays)

Government
  - Type: Sangguniang Bayan
  - Mayor: Mohammad Daud Nabil D. Lantud
  - Vice Mayor: Lacson M. Lantud
  - Representative: Sittie Aminah Q. Dimaporo
  - Municipal Council: Members: Ryan Bin Lacson D. Lantud II; Motalib M. Lantud Jr.; Raimona B. Mangotara; Minsuari C. Naga; Acmad P. Magomnang; H. Faisal T. Ibrahim; Hamim M. Macabangun; Musa D. Gute
  - Electorate: 12,152 voters (2025)

Area
  - Total: 124.30 km^{2} (47.99 sq mi)
- Elevation: 582 m (1,909 ft)
- Highest elevation: 933 m (3,061 ft)
- Lowest elevation: 362 m (1,188 ft)

Population (2024 census)
  - Total: 32,557
  - Density: 261.92/km^{2} (678.38/sq mi)
  - Households: 4,521

Economy
  - Income class: 3rd municipal income class
  - Poverty incidence: 58.29% (2023)
  - Revenue: ₱ 150.6 million (2024)
  - Assets: ₱ 24.68 million (2024)
  - Expenditure: ₱ 151 million (2024)
  - Liabilities: ₱ 9.594 million (2024)

Service provider
  - Electricity: Lanao del Sur Electric Cooperative (LASURECO)
- Time zone: UTC+8 (PST)
- ZIP code: 9208
- PSGC: 1003516000
- IDD : area code: +63 (0)63
- Native languages: Maranao; Cebuano; Binukid; Tagalog
- Major religions: Islam
- Website: www.pantaoragatldn.gov.ph

Pantao Ragat, officially the Municipality of Pantao Ragat (Maranao: Inged a Pantao Ragat; Cebuano: Lungsod sa Pantao Ragat; Tagalog: Bayan ng Pantao Ragat), is a municipality in the province of Lanao del Norte, Philippines. According to the 2024 census, it has a population of 32,557 people.

Pantao Ragat is the mother town of Matungao and Poona Piagapo.

== Geography ==
=== Barangays ===
Pantao Ragat is politically subdivided into 20 barangays. Each barangay consists of puroks while some have sitios.

- Aloon
- Banday
- Bubong Pantao Ragat
- Bobonga Radapan
- Cabasagan
- Calawe
- Culubun
- Dilimbayan
- Dimayon
- Lomidong
- Madaya
- Maliwanag
- Matampay
- Natangcopan
- Pansor
- Pantao Marug
- Poblacion East
- Poblacion West
- Tangcal
- Tongcopan

=== Climate ===
Climate data for Pantao Ragat, Lanao del Norte
Month	Jan	Feb	Mar	Apr	May	Jun	Jul	Aug	Sep	Oct	Nov	Dec	Year
Mean daily maximum °C (°F)	25 (77)	25 (77)	26 (79)	27 (81)	26 (79)	26 (79)	26 (79)	26 (79)	26 (79)	26 (79)	26 (79)	25 (77)	26 (79)
Mean daily minimum °C (°F)	21 (70)	20 (68)	21 (70)	21 (70)	22 (72)	22 (72)	21 (70)	21 (70)	21 (70)	21 (70)	21 (70)	21 (70)	21 (70)
Average precipitation mm (inches)	159 (6.3)	143 (5.6)	166 (6.5)	183 (7.2)	357 (14.1)	414 (16.3)	333 (13.1)	309 (12.2)	289 (11.4)	285 (11.2)	253 (10.0)	166 (6.5)	3,057 (120.4)
Average rainy days	18.4	17.2	20.6	23.4	29.3	29.2	29.9	29.4	27.7	28.7	25.5	19.9	299.2
Source: Meteoblue

== Demographics ==
Population census of Pantao Ragat
Year	Pop.	±% p.a.
1918	2,294	—
1939	4,396	+3.15%
1948	6,121	+3.75%
1960	4,548	−2.44%
1970	6,306	+3.32%
1975	14,389	+17.99%
1980	9,776	−7.44%
1990	12,530	+2.51%
1995	14,637	+2.96%
2000	16,474	+2.57%
2007	20,097	+2.78%
2010	23,122	+5.24%
2015	27,866	+3.62%
2020	30,247	+1.74%
2024	32,557	+1.78%
Source: Philippine Statistics Authority

== Economy ==
Poverty incidence of Pantao Ragat (%)

Source: Philippine Statistics Authority

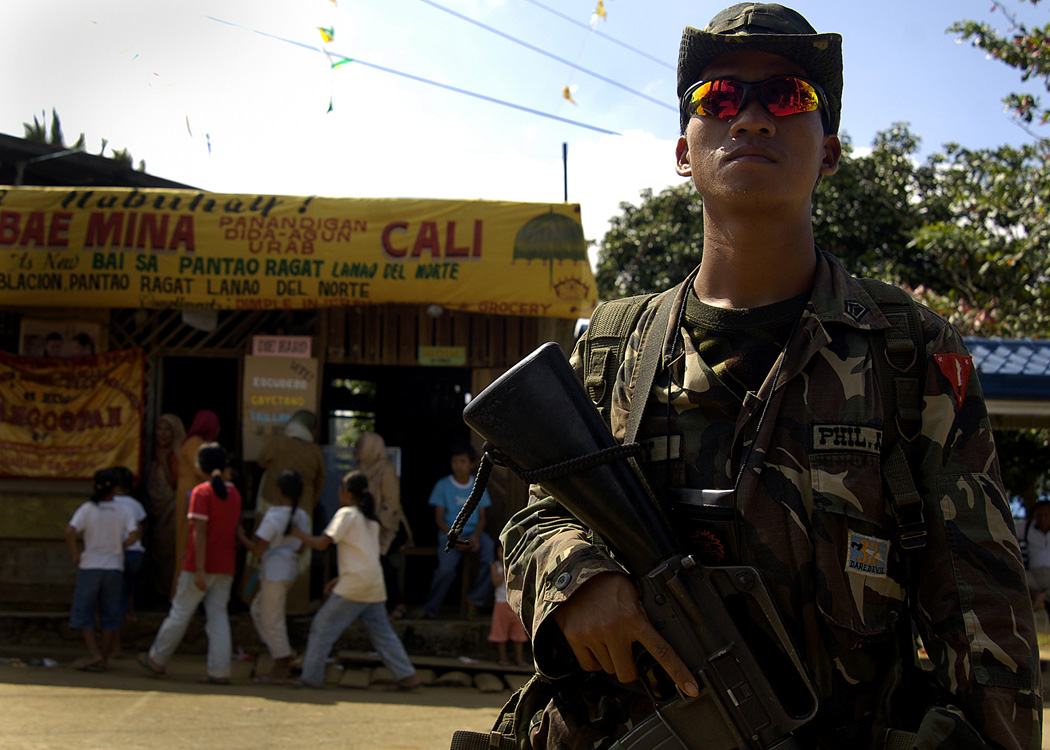
A Philippine Army soldier standing on guard in Pantao Ragat in 2007
