= Magsaysay, Lanao del Norte =

Municipality in Lanao del Norte, Philippines

Magsaysay
- Municipality
- Municipality of Magsaysay
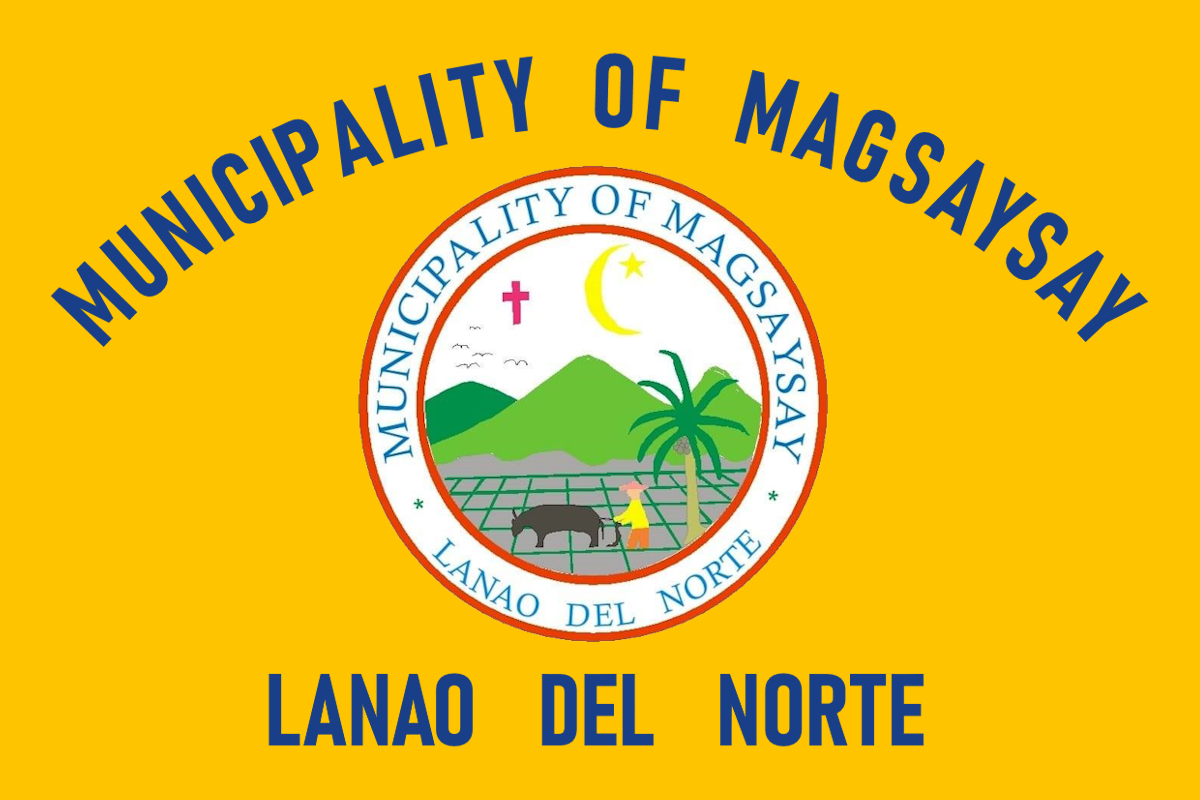
- Flag Seal

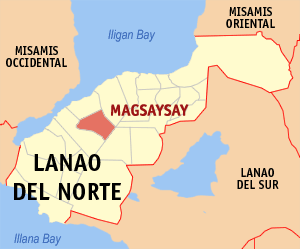
- Map of Lanao del Norte with Magsaysay highlighted
- Interactive map of Magsaysay
- Location within the Philippines
- Coordinates: 8°02′N 123°55′E
- Country: Philippines
- Region: Northern Mindanao
- Province: Lanao del Norte
- District: 2nd district
- Founded: December 10, 1964
- Named for: Ramon Magsaysay
- Barangays: 24 (see Barangays)

Government
  - Type: Sangguniang Bayan
  - Mayor: Haironi D. Omar
  - Vice Mayor: Wilmor B. Patarlas
  - Representative: Sittie Aminah Q. Dimaporo
  - Municipal Council: Members: Herbert B. Oyog; Rosa P. Bastigue; Gabriel Acmad S. Omar; Walter L. Aguinid; Ameroden B. Guinal; Mangawan E. Cali; Dariday D. Obinay; Jamalodin O. Omar
  - Electorate: 12,348 voters (2025)

Area
  - Total: 151.83 km^{2} (58.62 sq mi)
- Elevation: 252 m (827 ft)
- Highest elevation: 588 m (1,929 ft)
- Lowest elevation: 58 m (190 ft)

Population (2024 census)
  - Total: 20,581
  - Density: 135.55/km^{2} (351.08/sq mi)
  - Households: 4,665

Economy
  - Income class: 3rd municipal income class
  - Poverty incidence: 43.91% (2023)
  - Revenue: ₱ 20.42 million (2024)
  - Assets: ₱ 287.8 million (2024)
  - Expenditure: ₱ 161.7 million (2024)
  - Liabilities: ₱ 113.1 million (2024)

Service provider
  - Electricity: Lanao del Norte Electric Cooperative (LANECO)
- Time zone: UTC+8 (PST)
- ZIP code: 9221
- PSGC: 1003511000
- IDD : area code: +63 (0)63
- Native languages: Maranao; Cebuano; Binukid; Tagalog
- Website: www.magsaysayldn.gov.ph

Magsaysay, officially the Municipality of Magsaysay (Maranao: Inged a Magsaysay; Cebuano: Lungsod sa Magsaysay; Tagalog: Bayan ng Magsaysay), is a municipality in the province of Lanao del Norte, Philippines. According to the 2024 census, it has a population of 20,581 people.

== History ==
Executive Order No. 389, s. 1960 (22 March 1960) created the municipal district of Magsaysay from the following barrios/sitios:

From Kolambugan:

- Bago-Ingud
- Tambacon
- Somiarang
- Maitowato
- Lemoncret
- Olango
- Taguitingan
- Tawinian
- Ilihan
- Sulaman
- Rarab
- Pinalingco
- Lumbac
- Mapantao

From Tubod

- Baguiguicon

From Tangcal

- Pangao
- Pilingkingan
- Labo
- Malabaogan
- Lawigdato
- Matungao

Originally, Tangcal is part of Municipality of Munai. Some of the barangay in Magsaysay is the same with Tangcal because of the same location.

The first mayor of the municipality was Mayor Lumantas who was then succeeded by Mayor Guimba Dimakuta. He was then succeeded by Mayor Abdul Rashid M. Dimaporo in an election whose candidacy was challenged by three other candidates.

== Geography ==
=== Barangays ===
Magsaysay is politically subdivided into 24 barangays. Each barangay consists of puroks while some have sitios.

- Babasalon
- Baguiguicon
- Daan Campo
- Durianon
- Ilihan
- Lamigadato
- Lemoncret
- Lubo
- Lumbac
- Malabaogan
- Mapantao
- Olango
- Pangao
- Pelingkingan
- Lower Caningag (Perimbangan)
- Poblacion (Bago-A-Ingud)
- Rarab
- Somiorang
- Upper Caningag (Taguitingan)
- Talambo
- Tambacon
- Tawinian
- Tipaan
- Tombador

=== Climate ===
Climate data for Magsaysay, Lanao del Norte
Month	Jan	Feb	Mar	Apr	May	Jun	Jul	Aug	Sep	Oct	Nov	Dec	Year
Mean daily maximum °C (°F)	27 (81)	28 (82)	28 (82)	29 (84)	28 (82)	28 (82)	27 (81)	28 (82)	28 (82)	28 (82)	28 (82)	27 (81)	28 (82)
Mean daily minimum °C (°F)	20 (68)	20 (68)	20 (68)	21 (70)	22 (72)	22 (72)	22 (72)	22 (72)	22 (72)	22 (72)	21 (70)	21 (70)	21 (71)
Average precipitation mm (inches)	69 (2.7)	58 (2.3)	67 (2.6)	60 (2.4)	109 (4.3)	114 (4.5)	83 (3.3)	78 (3.1)	76 (3.0)	92 (3.6)	86 (3.4)	63 (2.5)	955 (37.7)
Average rainy days	12.8	11.6	14.8	17.4	24.8	23.5	20.7	18.5	17.4	22.5	21.6	15.6	221.2
Source: Meteoblue

== Demographics ==
Population census of Magsaysay
Year	Pop.	±% p.a.
1970	7,999	—
1975	5,981	−5.66%
1980	7,302	+4.07%
1990	8,841	+1.93%
1995	10,279	+2.86%
2000	11,218	+1.89%
2007	12,298	+1.28%
2010	16,442	+11.15%
2015	19,019	+2.81%
2020	20,463	+1.55%
2024	20,581	+0.14%
Source: Philippine Statistics Authority

== Economy ==
Poverty incidence of Magsaysay (%)

Source: Philippine Statistics Authority
