= Munai =

Municipality in Lanao del Norte, Philippines

Munai موناي
- Municipality
- Municipality of Munai
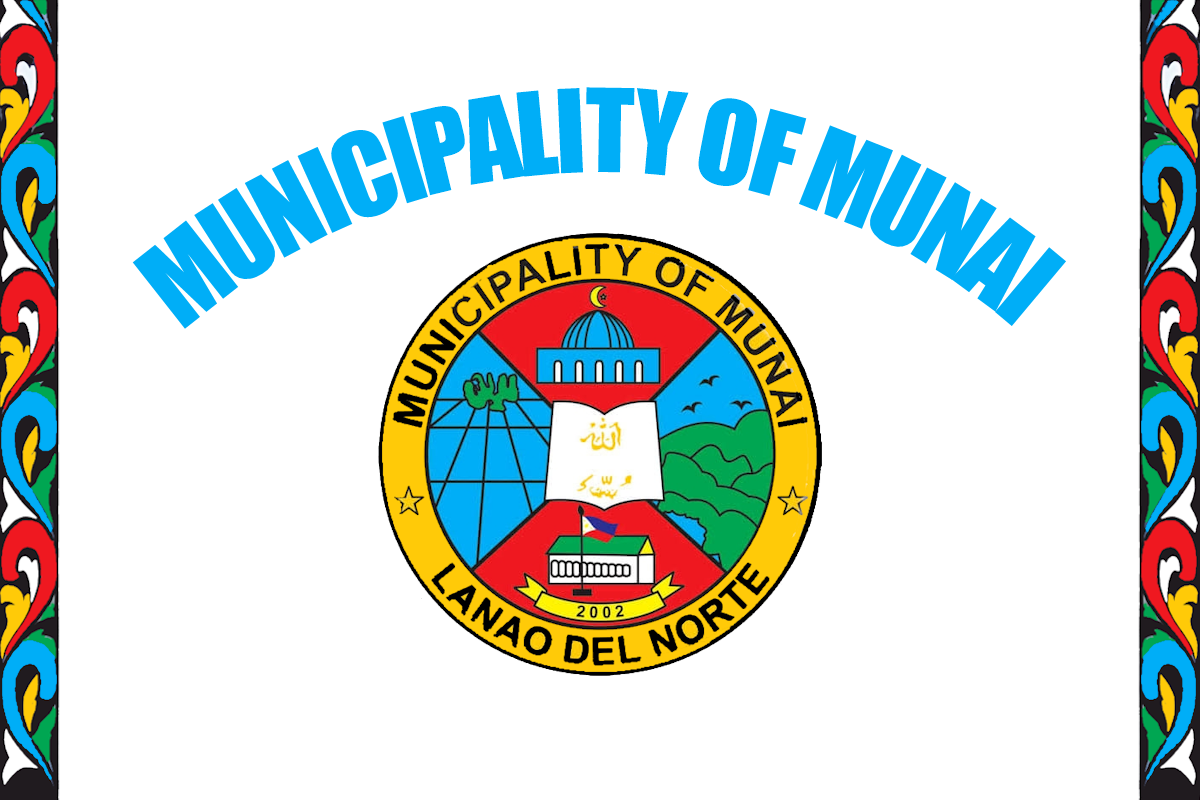
- Flag Seal

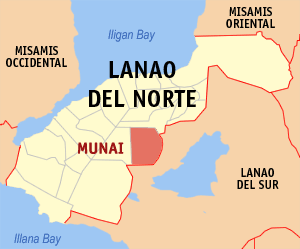
- Map of Lanao del Norte with Munai highlighted
- Interactive map of Munai
- Location within the Philippines
- Coordinates: 8°04′43″N 124°03′07″E
- Country: Philippines
- Region: Northern Mindanao
- Province: Lanao del Norte
- District: 2nd district
- Founded: August 17, 1917
- Barangays: 26 (see Barangays)

Government
  - Type: Sangguniang Bayan
  - Mayor: Racma D. Andamama
  - Vice Mayor: Abdulazis A. Batingolo
  - Representative: Sittie Amina Q. Dimaporo
  - Municipal Council: Members: Moamar L. Aninter; Hanan M. Guyo; Aiman D. Mutia; Aslanie D. Acmad; Puyat L. Macaan; Jasmin M. Batalo; Onda G. Sarip; Jabbar L. Abbas
  - Electorate: 13,423 voters (2025)

Area
  - Total: 197.50 km^{2} (76.26 sq mi)
- Elevation: 825 m (2,707 ft)
- Highest elevation: 1,531 m (5,023 ft)
- Lowest elevation: 515 m (1,690 ft)

Population (2024 census)
  - Total: 36,449
  - Density: 184.55/km^{2} (477.99/sq mi)
  - Households: 7,168

Economy
  - Income class: 2nd municipal income class
  - Poverty incidence: 51.88% (2023)
  - Revenue: ₱ 183.4 million (2024)
  - Assets: ₱ 331.8 million (2024)
  - Expenditure: ₱ 176.4 million (2024)
  - Liabilities: ₱ 164.5 million (2024)

Service provider
  - Electricity: Lanao del Norte Electric Cooperative (LANECO)
- Time zone: UTC+8 (PST)
- ZIP code: 9219
- PSGC: 1003514000
- IDD : area code: +63 (0)63
- Native languages: Maranao; Cebuano; Binukid; Tagalog
- Major religions: Islam
- Website: www.munaildn.gov.ph

Munai, officially the Municipality of Munai (Maranao: Inged a Munai; Cebuano: Lungsod sa Munai; Tagalog: Bayan ng Munai), is a municipality in the province of Lanao del Norte, Philippines. According to the 2024 census, it has a population of 36,449 people.

== History ==
Before American colonization, Munai was formerly a part of the State of Unayan, Confederate States of Lanao based from ancient boundaries.

The municipality of Munai traces its name to the “foundation” or origin of the Four Federated Sultanates of Lanao (Pata Phangampong nga Ranao). These four divisions have very close kinship ties which the settler called "Munai" on August 17, 1917 by virtue of the commonwealth Act No.38, out of the Province of Misamis. It became a regular Province of Lanao del Norte on May 23, 1970 by virtue of the Commonwealth Act. It is a fourth class municipality with 26 barangays. It is situated in the hinter land of the Province of Lanao del Norte, 18 kilometer away from the national high way. The population is predominantly Maranao with Islam as the religion. Generally, farming is the means of livelihood of the people. Copra. Corn, rice are among the major crops and vegetables are produced in minor level. About 80 percent of the population are farmers, and approximately 20 percent are engaged in small scale business and less than 1 percentage work as government employees. Munai has untapped rivers and springs potential for tourism. The Ledupa river flows 100 meters underground in the mountainous area of Barangay Tambo. The Omnang spring has 5 spring sources with crystal clear water.

== Geography ==
Geographically, Munai is bounded by the municipalities of Tangcal, Bacolod and Kauswagan on the north, Poona Piagapo on the east, Piagapo on the south, and Madalum on the west.

=== Barangays ===
Munai is politically subdivided into 26 barangays. Each barangay consists of puroks while some have sitios.

- Bacayawan
- Balabacun
- Balintad
- Kadayonan
- Dalama
- Lindongan
- Lingco-an
- Lininding
- Lumba-Bayabao
- Madaya
- Maganding
- Matampay
- Old Poblacion
- North Cadulawan
- Panggao
- Pantao
- Pantao-A-Munai
- Pantaon
- Pindolonan
- Punong
- Ramain
- Sundiga-Munai
- Tagoranao
- Tambo (Town Proper)
- Tamparan (Mandaya)
- Taporog

=== Climate ===
Climate data for Munai, Lanao del Norte
Month	Jan	Feb	Mar	Apr	May	Jun	Jul	Aug	Sep	Oct	Nov	Dec	Year
Mean daily maximum °C (°F)	28 (82)	28 (82)	29 (84)	31 (88)	30 (86)	29 (84)	29 (84)	30 (86)	30 (86)	29 (84)	27 (81)	27 (81)	29 (84)
Mean daily minimum °C (°F)	24 (75)	24 (75)	25 (77)	27 (81)	26 (79)	26 (79)	26 (79)	26 (79)	26 (79)	26 (79)	24 (75)	25 (77)	25 (78)
Average precipitation mm (inches)	31.49 (1.24)	88.5 (3.48)	44.56 (1.75)	226.58 (8.92)	715.93 (28.19)	522.73 (20.58)	213.35 (8.40)	139.05 (5.47)	296.09 (11.66)	161.73 (6.37)	254.7 (10.03)	257.6 (10.14)	2,952.31 (116.23)
Average rainy days	23	27	27	26	31	30	31	25	30	31	29	31	341
Source: World Weather Online

== Demographics ==
Population census of Munai
Year	Pop.	±% p.a.
1918	633	—
1939	1,073	+2.54%
1948	2,549	+10.09%
1960	3,882	+3.57%
1970	5,219	+3.00%
1975	10,985	+16.10%
1980	6,015	−11.34%
1990	12,006	+7.16%
1995	13,893	+2.77%
2000	15,972	+3.03%
2007	20,594	+3.57%
2010	27,600	+11.24%
2015	32,973	+3.45%
2020	35,020	+1.28%
2024	36,449	+0.96%
Source: Philippine Statistics Authority

=== Religion ===
Location of mosques:

- Tambo (Poblacion), can accommodate 200 to 300 people
- Old Poblacion, Can accommodate 100 to 200 people

== Economy ==
Poverty incidence of Munai (%)

Source: Philippine Statistics Authority

List of local products

- Corn, primary business for agriculture
- Rice farm (Basak in Maranao Term), primary business for agriculture
- Coconut, primary business for agriculture
- Abaca
- Lumber
- Livestock
- Falcata
- Banana
- Fish Pond

== Government ==
Elected officials 2025 - 2028:

- Municipal Mayor: Racma Dansal Andamama
- Vice Mayor: Abdul Azis "Dante" M. Batingolo
- Sangguniang Bayan:
  - Moamar L. Aninter (1st)
  - Aslanie D. Acmad (2nd)
  - Hanan Guyo (3rd)
  - Joharie R. Binta (4th)
  - Aiman D. Mutia (5th)
  - Onda G. Sarip (6th)
  - Mobarak L. Abdulrahim (7th)
  - Sadat B. Balowa (8th)
- ABC President: Ikie L. Balabagan
- SK Federated President: Jarir Noraldean Hamza M. Arumpac
- SB Secretary: Nesrin M. Batalo

=== List of former mayors ===
During Martial Law:

- 1971 - 1972: Sultan Sandangan Amuntao Balowa
- 1972 - 1973: H. Malik / Baraguir Balabagan
- 1974 - 1976: H. Usman / Macaan T. Condalo

After People Power Revolution of 1986:

- unknown date: Pasinsong Obinay Daco (appointed)
- 1986 - 1989: Danny Alinog (appointed)
- 1989 - 1992: Danny Alinog (elected)
- 1992 - 1995: Tawantawan Mamantar Cauntongan
- 1995 - 1998: Tawantawan Mamantar Cauntongan
- 1998 - 2001: Casan Maquiling
- 2001 - 2004: Casan Maquiling
- 2004 - 2007: Casan Maquiling
- 2007 - 2010: Muammar Maquiling
- 2010 - 2013: Muammar Maquiling
- 2013 - 2016: Muammar Maquiling
- 2016 - 2019: Casan Maquiling
- 2019 - 2022: Racma Dansal Andamama
- 2022 - 2025: Racma Dansal Andamama

=== List of former vice mayors ===
Vice mayors after People Power Revolution 1986:

- 1987 - 1989: OIC
- 1989 - 1992: Odek Loksadatu Balabagan
- 1992 - 1995: Odek Loksadatu Balabagan
- 1995 - 1998: Odek Loksadatu Balabagan
- 1998 - 2001: H.Hanifa A. Balabagan
- 2001 - 2004: H.Hanifa A. Balabagan
- 2004 - 2007: Carisa Domrang
- 2007 - 2010: Carisa Domrang
- 2010 - 2013: Carisa Domrang
- 2013 - 2016: Ikie L. Balabagan
- 2016 - 2019: Ikie L. Balabagan
- 2019 - 2022: Abdul Azis M. Batingolo
- 2022 - 2025: Abdul Azis M. Batingolo

== Education ==
- Balabacon Primary School
- Balintad Primary School
- Cadayonan Primary School
- Cadulawan Primary School
- Lininding Elementary School
- Matampay Primary School
- Munai Central Elementary School
- Pendolonan Elementary School
- Punong Primary School
- Ramain Primary School
- Tambo Elementary School
- Tamparan Primary School
- Taporog Primary School
- Munai National High School
- Sundiga-Munai Primary School
- Panggao Cluster Elementary School
