= Sapad =

Municipality in Lanao del Norte, Philippines

- Municipality
- Municipality of Sapad
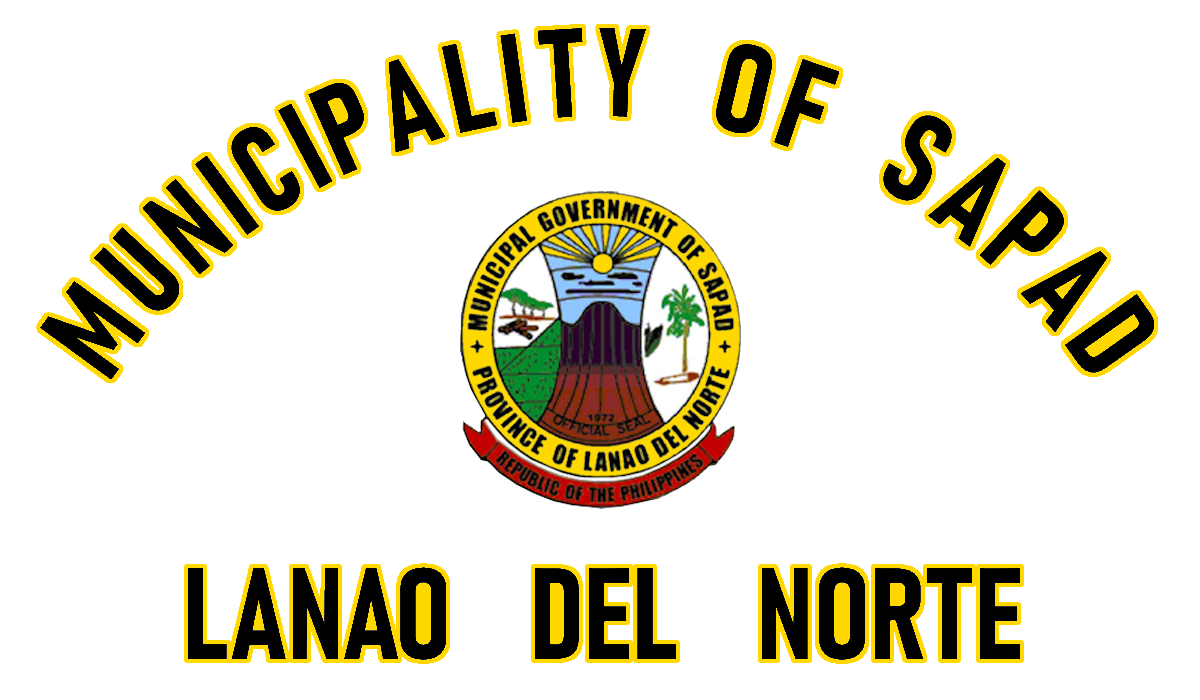
- Flag Seal

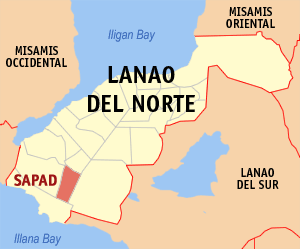
- Map of Lanao del Norte with Sapad highlighted
- Interactive map of Sapad
- Location within the Philippines
- Coordinates: 7°51′00″N 123°50′00″E
- Country: Philippines
- Region: Northern Mindanao
- Province: Lanao del Norte
- District: 2nd district
- Founded: June 21, 1969
- Barangays: 17 (see Barangays)

Government
  - Type: Sangguniang Bayan
  - Mayor: Paruk U. Asis
  - Vice Mayor: Rudy Rick B. Patalinghug
  - Representative: Sitti Aminah Quibranza Dimaporo
  - Municipal Council: Members: 1.Hon.Mohammad Sahab D.Asis; 2.Hon.Diego T.Samporna; 3.Hon.Salie S.Alando; 4.Hon.virgilito M.Bienes; 5.Hon.Esnaira M. labe; 6.Hon.Carol G.Tijing; 7.Hon.Elmer P.Sienes; 8.Hon.Edgar A.Demavivas; ABC PRES:Hon.Abbubacar U.Asis; SK Federated:Arip M. Asis
  - Electorate: 11,860 voters (2025)

Area
  - Total: 140.03 km^{2} (54.07 sq mi)
- Elevation: 147 m (482 ft)
- Highest elevation: 758 m (2,487 ft)
- Lowest elevation: 21 m (69 ft)

Population (2024 census)
  - Total: 24,826
  - Density: 177.29/km^{2} (459.18/sq mi)
  - Households: 5,539

Economy
  - Income class: 4th municipal income class
  - Poverty incidence: 41.93% (2023)
  - Revenue: ₱ 112.9 million (2024)
  - Assets: ₱ 153.4 million (2024)
  - Expenditure: ₱ 102.1 million (2024)
  - Liabilities: ₱ 31.85 million (2024)

Service provider
  - Electricity: Lanao del Norte Electric Cooperative (LANECO)
- Time zone: UTC+8 (PST)
- ZIP code: 9213
- PSGC: 1003519000
- IDD : area code: +63 (0)63
- Native languages: Maranao; Cebuano; Binukid; Tagalog

Sapad, officially the Municipality of Sapad (Maranao: Inged a Sapad; Cebuano: Lungsod sa Sapad; Tagalog: Bayan ng Sapad), is a municipality in the province of Lanao del Norte, Philippines. According to the 2024 census, it has a population of 24,826 people.

== History ==
Sapad was created by virtue of Republic Act No. 5745 where it is separated from the Municipality of Kapatagan, province of Lanao del Norte, and constituted into a district and independent municipality, to be known as the Municipality of Sapad, same province. The seat of government of the new municipality shall be in the present site of the barrio Sapad. The boundary of said territory shall be as follows:

From km. 112 along Kapatagan-Buriasan Road,

- S 7 deg. — 10 min. E. to point "A" located at the west corner of the agricultural land of Mr. Antonio Angeles, where he is at present residing and cultivating situated at barrio Katipunan, Kapatagan, Lanao del Norte, then
- S 73 deg. — 30 min. E, Distance 980 meters to point "B" on the same boundary, the
- S 26 deg. — 00 min. E, Distance 2,000 meters to Balilisa Peak, them
- S 53 deg. — 10 min. E, Distance 10,000 meters to Karkum Peak then
- S 20 deg. — 10 min E, Distance 2,100 meters to Inayawan Peak, then follow the course of Cabuyao river downstream, down to point "G" intersection of Cabuyao, Pansilan and Maranding rivers.
- S 25 deg. — 15 min. E. (Approx. more or less) Intersection of Cabuyao, Maranding and Pansilan Rivers to point "H", (Intersection of Cabayugan and Pansilan rivers), then
- S 22 deg. — 05 min. E., (Approx, more or less) Intersection of Babayugan river "H" to point "I", then
- S 64 deg. — 30 min. W, Point "I" Junction km. 112.00 (Approx.)

== Geography ==
=== Barangays ===
Sapad is politically subdivided into 17 barangays. Each barangay consists of puroks while some have sitios.

- Baning
- Poblacion Sapad (formerly Buriasan)
- Dansalan
- Gamal
- Inudaran I
- Inudaran II
- Karkum
- Katipunan
- Mabugnao
- Maito Salug
- Mala Salug
- Mama-anon
- Mapurog
- Pancilan
- Panoloon
- Pili
- Lower Sapad

=== Climate ===
Climate data for Sapad, Lanao del Norte
Month	Jan	Feb	Mar	Apr	May	Jun	Jul	Aug	Sep	Oct	Nov	Dec	Year
Mean daily maximum °C (°F)	29 (84)	30 (86)	30 (86)	31 (88)	30 (86)	29 (84)	29 (84)	30 (86)	30 (86)	29 (84)	30 (86)	29 (84)	30 (85)
Mean daily minimum °C (°F)	22 (72)	22 (72)	22 (72)	23 (73)	24 (75)	24 (75)	24 (75)	23 (73)	24 (75)	24 (75)	23 (73)	23 (73)	23 (74)
Average precipitation mm (inches)	69 (2.7)	58 (2.3)	67 (2.6)	60 (2.4)	109 (4.3)	114 (4.5)	83 (3.3)	78 (3.1)	76 (3.0)	92 (3.6)	86 (3.4)	63 (2.5)	955 (37.7)
Average rainy days	12.8	11.6	14.8	17.4	24.8	23.5	20.7	18.5	17.4	22.5	21.6	15.6	221.2
Source: Meteoblue

== Demographics ==
Population census of Sapad
Year	Pop.	±% p.a.
1970	12,723	—
1975	3,830	−21.40%
1980	6,304	+10.48%
1990	13,206	+7.68%
1995	14,595	+1.89%
2000	15,167	+0.83%
2007	17,191	+1.74%
2010	19,479	+4.65%
2015	21,309	+1.72%
2020	22,974	+1.60%
2024	24,826	+1.88%
Source: Philippine Statistics Authority

== Economy ==
Poverty incidence of Sapad (%)

Source: Philippine Statistics Authority
