= Poona Piagapo =

Municipality in Lanao del Norte, Philippines

Poona Piagapo فوعونا فياغافو
- Municipality
- Municipality of Poona Piagapo
- Seal

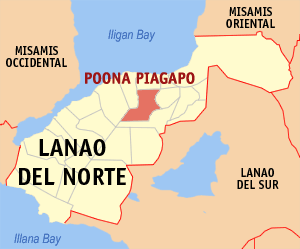
- Map of Lanao del Norte with Poona Piagapo highlighted
- Interactive map of Poona Piagapo
- Location within the Philippines
- Coordinates: 8°08′05″N 124°07′05″E
- Country: Philippines
- Region: Northern Mindanao
- Province: Lanao del Norte
- District: 2nd district
- Founded: March 31, 1976
- Barangays: 26 (see Barangays)

Government
  - Type: Sangguniang Bayan
  - Mayor: Muslima T. Macol
  - Vice Mayor: Imelda T. Polayagan
  - Representative: Abdullah D. Dimaporo
  - Municipal Council: Members: Norania B. Tanggote; Cosain M. Dawal; Alibasher O. Mustafha; Abinal P. Sultan; Ansarey T. Fernando; Casanor P. Pacalna; Omar A. Racmat; Japar T. Ampang
  - Electorate: 12,897 voters (2025)

Area
  - Total: 260.07 km^{2} (100.41 sq mi)
- Elevation: 550 m (1,800 ft)
- Highest elevation: 983 m (3,225 ft)
- Lowest elevation: 226 m (741 ft)

Population (2024 census)
  - Total: 30,666
  - Density: 117.91/km^{2} (305.40/sq mi)
  - Households: 5,082

Economy
  - Income class: 2nd municipal income class
  - Poverty incidence: 58.79% (2023)
  - Revenue: ₱ 11.41 million (2024)
  - Assets: ₱ 206 million (2024)
  - Expenditure: ₱ 168.8 million (2024)
  - Liabilities: ₱ 18.75 million (2024)

Service provider
  - Electricity: Lanao del Norte Electric Cooperative (LANECO)
- Time zone: UTC+8 (PST)
- ZIP code: 9204
- PSGC: 1003517000
- IDD : area code: +63 (0)63
- Native languages: Maranao; Cebuano; Binukid; Tagalog
- Major religions: Islam
- Website: www.poonapiagapoldn.gov.ph

Poona Piagapo, officially the Municipality of Poona Piagapo (Maranao: Inged a Poona Piagapo; Cebuano: Lungsod sa Poona Piagapo; Tagalog: Bayan ng Poona Piagapo), is a municipality in the province of Lanao del Norte, Philippines. According to the 2024 census, it has a population of 30,666 people.

== History ==
Under Presidential Decree No. 916, 31 March 1976, the town of Poona Piagapo was created from the following:

- The barangays of Tangklao, Piangamanganan, Kadayonan, Lupitan, Punud, Kabasaran, Pantau-Raya, Kablanga, Pantaon, Nunungen, Lumbaka-Ingud, and Tadoken in the municipality of Pantau-Ragat,
- the barangays of Lumbaka-Ingud, Pened, Domiorog, Daramba, Nunang, Sulo, Caromatan, Tagoranao, Madamba, Lumbatan, Madaya, Bobong-Dinaig, Linindingan, Maliwanag, Dinaig, Timbangalan, Pindolonan, and Alowin in the municipality of Matungao,

all in the province of Lanao del Norte, are hereby separated from said municipalities and constituted into a distinct and independent municipality to be known as the municipality of Poona-Piagapo in the province of Lanao del Norte. The seat of the new municipality shall be located at the barangay of Poona-Piagapo to be established within the proximity of Barangay Lumbaka-Ingud.

== Geography ==
=== Barangays ===
Poona Piagapo is politically subdivided into 26 barangays. Each barangay consists of puroks while some have sitios.

- Alowin
- Bubong-Dinaig
- Cormatan
- Daramba
- Dinaig
- Cabasaran
- Kablangan
- Cadayonan
- Linindingan
- Lumbatan
- Lupitan
- Madamba
- Madaya
- Maliwanag
- Nunang
- Nunungan
- Pantao Raya
- Pantaon
- Pened
- Piangamangaan
- Pendolonan
- Poblacion (Lumbacaingud)
- Sulo
- Tagoranao
- Tangclao
- Timbangalan

=== Climate ===
Climate data for Poona Piagapo, Lanao del Norte
Month	Jan	Feb	Mar	Apr	May	Jun	Jul	Aug	Sep	Oct	Nov	Dec	Year
Mean daily maximum °C (°F)	25 (77)	26 (79)	26 (79)	27 (81)	27 (81)	26 (79)	26 (79)	26 (79)	27 (81)	26 (79)	26 (79)	26 (79)	26 (79)
Mean daily minimum °C (°F)	21 (70)	21 (70)	21 (70)	22 (72)	22 (72)	22 (72)	22 (72)	21 (70)	22 (72)	22 (72)	22 (72)	21 (70)	22 (71)
Average precipitation mm (inches)	159 (6.3)	143 (5.6)	166 (6.5)	183 (7.2)	357 (14.1)	414 (16.3)	333 (13.1)	309 (12.2)	289 (11.4)	285 (11.2)	253 (10.0)	166 (6.5)	3,057 (120.4)
Average rainy days	18.4	17.2	20.6	23.4	29.3	29.2	29.9	29.4	27.7	28.7	25.5	19.9	299.2
Source: Meteoblue

== Demographics ==
Population census of Poona Piagapo
Year	Pop.	±% p.a.
1980	6,026	—
1990	13,356	+8.29%
1995	14,161	+1.10%
2000	16,092	+2.78%
2007	19,818	+2.91%
2010	23,451	+6.32%
2015	27,018	+2.73%
2020	29,183	+1.64%
2024	30,666	+1.20%
Source: Philippine Statistics Authority

== Economy ==
Poverty incidence of Poona Piagapo (%)

Source: Philippine Statistics Authority

== Government ==
Mayors after People Power Revolution 1986:

- 1986 - 1992,
- 1992 - 1995,
- 1995 - 1998,
- 1998 - 2001,
- 2001 - 2004,
- Dr. Saripada Hadjiyusoph (2004 - 2010),
- Farhana R. Palawan (2010 - 2019),
- Muslima T. Macol (2019-2025)
- Engr. Ashley (Kaulit) Rakiin (Incumbent)

Vice Mayors after People Power Revolution 1986:

- 1986 - 1992,
- 1992 - 1995,
- 1995 - 1998,
- H.Haron G. Racmat (1998 - 2001),
- H.Haron G. Racmat (2001 - 2004),
- H.Aisah R. Didato (2004 - 2007),
- Muslima T. Macol (2007 - 2010),
- Rocma M. Maba (2010 - 2013),
- Imelda T. Polayagan (2013 - 2016),
- Dr. Saripada Hadjiyusoph (2016 - 2019),
- Imelda T. Polayagan (2019-2022);
- Norania B. Tanggote (2022-2025)
- Mirasol Mamarinta (Incumbent);
