= Panguil Bay =

Bay in Philippines

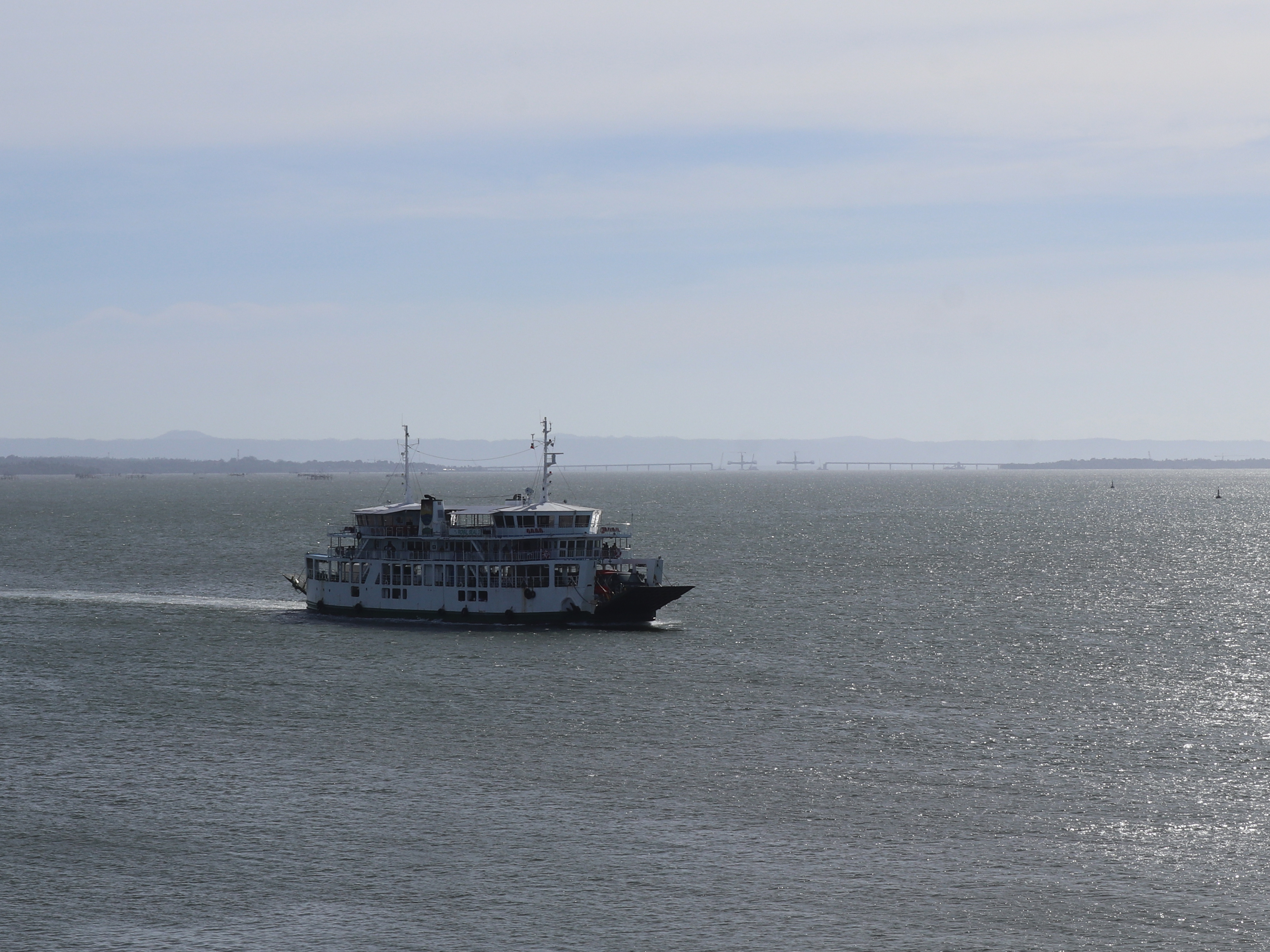
- A Roll-on/roll-off ferry with the Panguil Bay Bridge's construction ongoing in the distance

- Location within the Philippines Panguil Bay (Philippines)
- Location: Mindanao, Philippines
- Coordinates: 8°02′00″N 123°44′00″E
- Type: Bay
- Part of: Iligan Bay
- Max. length: 41 km (25 mi)
- Max. width: 11.5 km (7.1 mi)
- Surface area: 180 km^{2} (69 sq mi)
- Average depth: 15.4 m (51 ft)
- Max. depth: 55 m (180 ft)
- Shore length^{1}: 112 km (70 mi)
- Settlements: Aurora; Baroy; Bonifacio; Clarin; Kapatagan; Kolambugan; Lala; Maigo; Ozamiz; Tambulig; Tangub; Tubod
- ^{1} Shore length is not a well-defined measure.

Panguil Bay is an arm of Iligan Bay in Mindanao, Philippines. The bay forms the natural boundary separating the Zamboanga Peninsula from the rest of the island of Mindanao. It borders the provinces of Misamis Occidental, Zamboanga del Sur, and Lanao del Norte. Important cities and municipalities on its coast are Ozamiz and Tangub in Misamis Occidental, and Tubod, the capital of Lanao del Norte.

The entrance to the bay is marked by a lighthouse on the west side of Panguil Bay, located on a headland on the eastern side of Ozamiz harbor. The 9-metre (30 ft) high concrete tower has a focal plane of 17 metres (56 ft) with two red flashes every 10 seconds.

The Panguil Bay Bridge is a two-lane bridge connecting Tangub to Tubod. The 3.48-kilometre (2.16 mi) bridge reduces the travel time between Tangub and Tubod from 2.5 hours to 7 minutes. The ₱7.375-billion construction project started in 2020 and was opened on 27 September 2024.

== Geography ==
Panguil Bay is about 41 kilometres (25 mi) long, and has an area of 18,000 hectares (44,000 acres) with a coastline of 112 kilometres (70 mi). At its narrowest point between Tangub and Tubod, the bay is 1.7 kilometres (1.1 mi) wide, while it is 11.5 kilometres (7.1 mi) wide at the bay's mouth. The bottom topography is irregular with an average depth of 15.4 metres (51 ft) and a maximum depth of about 55 metres (180 ft).

There are 29 major and 46 minor river tributaries into the bay, originating from two mountain ranges. In total the bay has a catchment area of 309,738 hectares (765,380 acres).

At the mouth of the bay, there are two coral reefs: the Hulaw-Hulaw Reef on Loculan Shoals near Clarin, Misamis Occidental, and the Maigo Reef near Maigo, Lanao del Norte. Both reefs experience high sedimentation rates and are in fair to poor condition.

== History ==
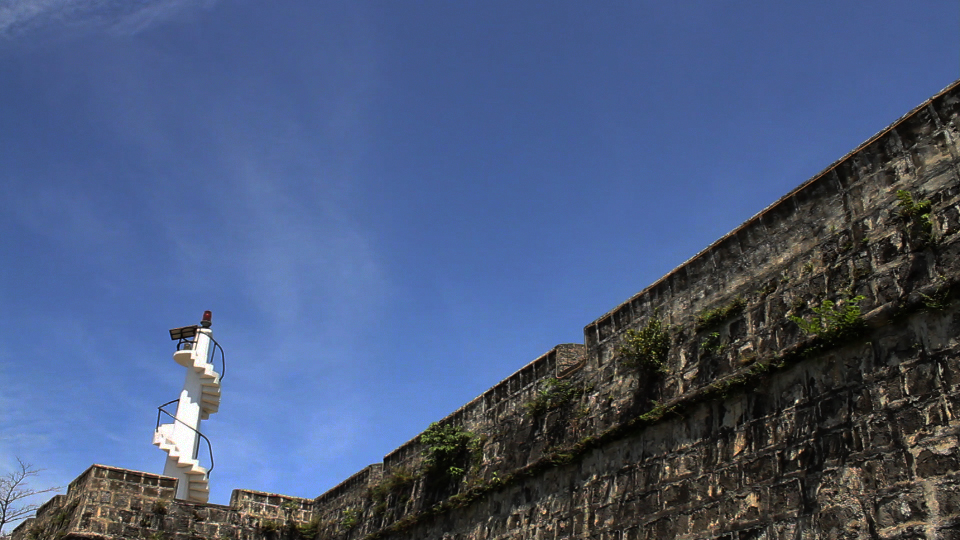
Fuerte de la Concepcion y del Triunfo

In the 1750s, the Fuerte de la Concepcion y del Triunfo in the town of Misamis, (now the modern city of Ozamiz) was built by the Spanish to guard the entrance to Panguil Bay. At that time Moro pirate raids were at their peak, and the bay was described as a "never ending source of Muslim pirates". In 1917, a lighthouse was built on the eastern bastion of the Spanish Fort.

== Ecology ==
The bay was once a rich fishing ground, with the most abundant species being the gray mullet (Mugil cephalus), anchovy (Stolephorus commersonnii) and oil sardine (Sardinella longiceps). Other important species are penaeid shrimps and prawns, gobies, pony fishes, blue crabs, therapons, carangids, lantern fishes, and hairtails. In 1980, there were about 4,000 fishermen, increasing to over 9,800 in 1995.

Panguil Bay has suffered for decades from overfishing and destructive fishing practices. One of the biggest contributor of over-exploitation was the extensive use of filter nets, locally called sanggab. These nets trap all marine organisms, even macroplankton, depleting the food chain in the bay. Compared to 1984, the number of fish species dropped from 201 to 121 by the mid-1990s.

Further degradation resulted from destruction of natural habitats (such as mangroves turned into fishponds), pollution by poisonous chemicals, and increasing human development along the bay's shore. The sharp decline in fish catch prompted rehabilitation efforts that included the removal of illegal fishing structures such as the filter nets that numbered in the thousands in the 2010s.
