= Kolambugan =

Municipality in Lanao del Norte, Philippines

- Municipality
- Municipality of Kolambugan
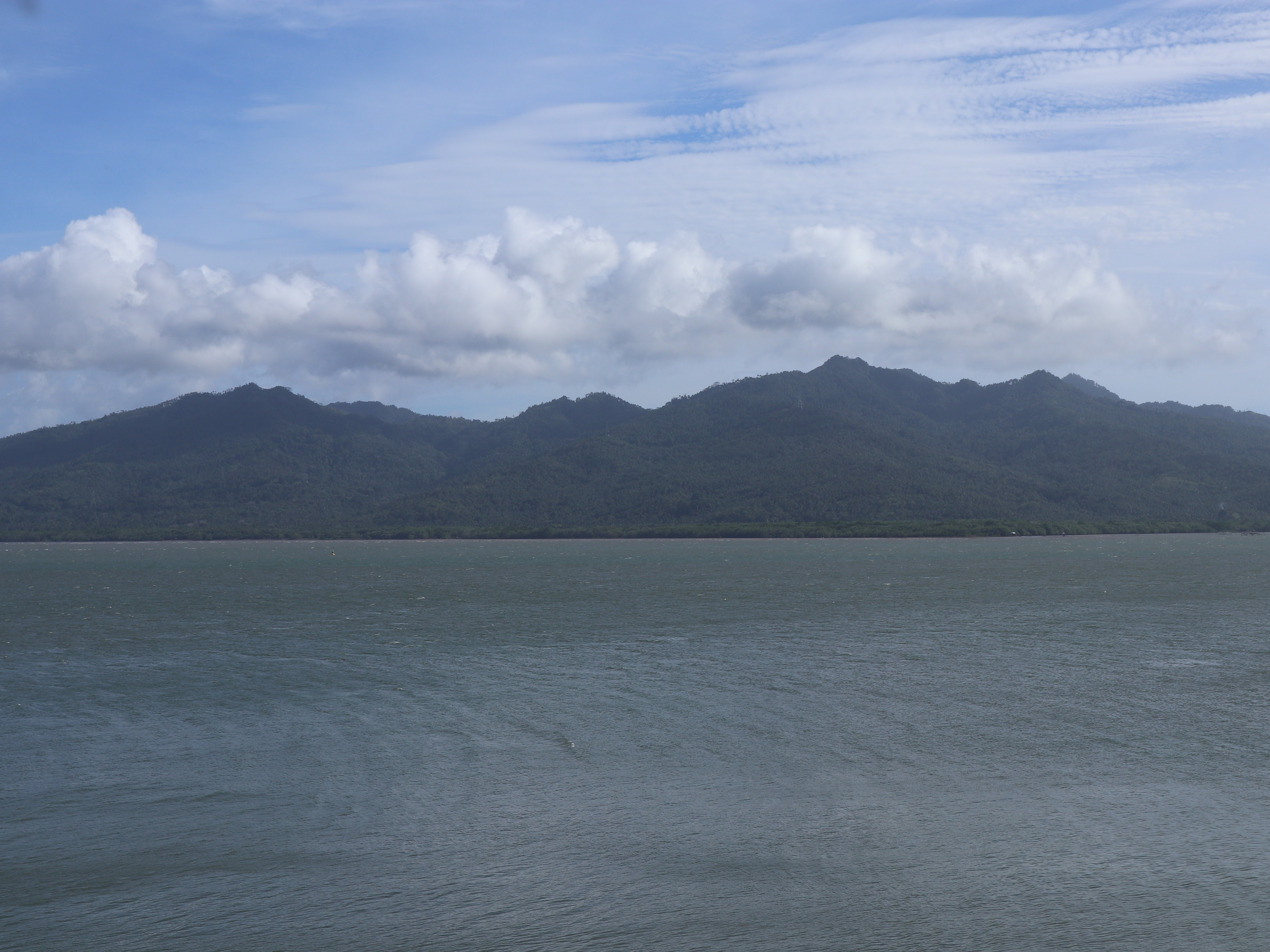
- Mount Bucas

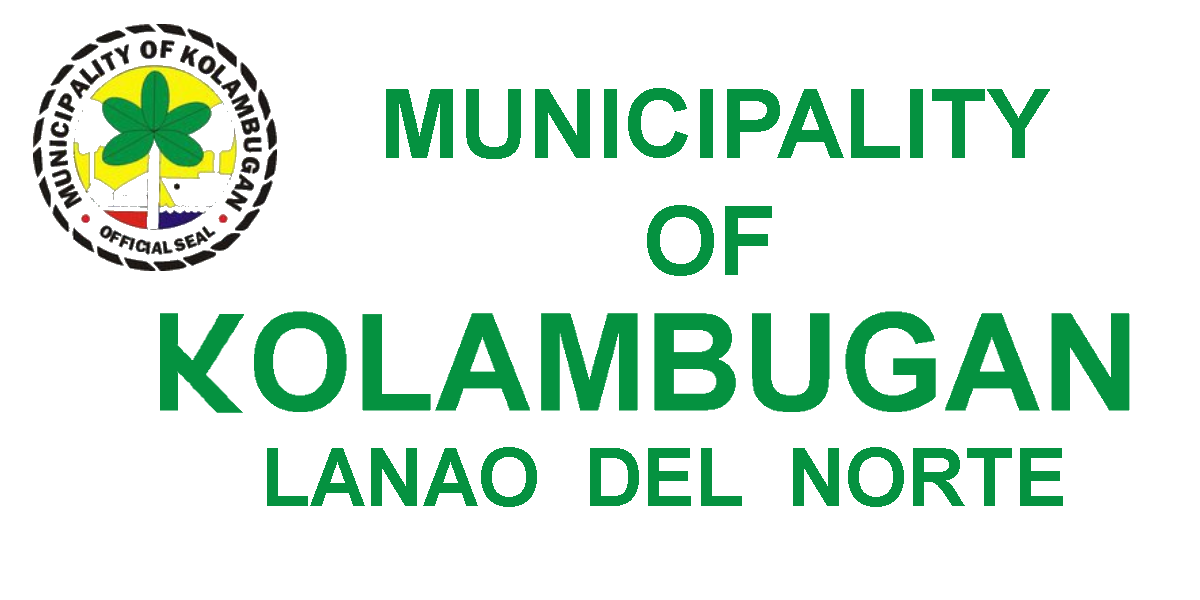
- Flag

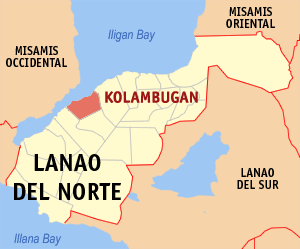
- Map of Lanao del Norte with Kolambugan highlighted
- Interactive map of Kolambugan
- Location within the Philippines
- Coordinates: 8°06′54″N 123°54′09″E
- Country: Philippines
- Region: Northern Mindanao
- Province: Lanao del Norte
- District: 1st district
- Founded: July 1, 1936
- Barangays: 26 (see Barangays)

Government
  - Type: Sangguniang Bayan
  - Mayor: Allan M. Omamos
  - Vice Mayor: Lorenzo Mañigos
  - Representative: Mohamad Khalid Q. Dimaporo
  - Municipal Council: Members: Setty Deamila C. Macarambon; Angelo S. Completado; Rhodora P. Manubag; Jimmy T. Bacalso; Ruben A. Martinez; Ariel T. Ortiz; Wilfredo M. Denopol; Brooke Lou T. Daomilas; Arthur R. Torres
  - Electorate: 17,466 voters (2025)

Area
  - Total: 134.55 km^{2} (51.95 sq mi)
- Elevation: 82 m (269 ft)
- Highest elevation: 547 m (1,795 ft)
- Lowest elevation: 0 m (0 ft)

Population (2024 census)
  - Total: 28,545
  - Density: 212.15/km^{2} (549.47/sq mi)
  - Households: 7,414

Economy
  - Income class: 3rd municipal income class
  - Poverty incidence: 29.2% (2023)
  - Revenue: ₱ 168.3 million (2024)
  - Assets: ₱ 439.3 million (2024)
  - Expenditure: ₱ 164.4 million (2024)
  - Liabilities: ₱ 96.93 million (2024)

Service provider
  - Electricity: Lanao del Norte Electric Cooperative (LANECO)
- Time zone: UTC+8 (PST)
- ZIP code: 9207
- PSGC: 1003508000
- IDD : area code: +63 (0)63
- Native languages: Maranao; Cebuano; Binukid; Tagalog
- Website: www.kolambugan.gov.ph

Kolambugan, officially the Municipality of Kolambugan (Cebuano: Lungsod sa Kolambugan; Maranao: Inged a Kolambugan; Tagalog: Bayan ng Kolambugan), is a municipality in the province of Lanao del Norte, Philippines. According to the 2024 census, it has a population of 28,545 people.

== Etymology ==
The name “Kolambugan” was taken from the word “kolambog”, a kind of tree which grew abundantly in the area. Some present day barangays were also called Migcamiguing and Maribojoc before, named also from trees of the same names which were found abundantly in the area.

== Geography ==
Kolambugan is located along the Panguil Bay area facing Ozamiz City in the Province of Misamis Occidental, 47 kilometres (29 mi) east of the capital town of Tubod. It is centrally located north-west in the province of Lanao del Norte. Kolambugan is bound by the Panguil Bay on the north Magsaysay on the south; Maigo on the east; and Tubod on the west.

=== Barangays ===
Kolambugan is politically subdivided into 26 barangays. Each barangay consists of puroks while some have sitios.

- Austin Heights
- Baybay
- Bubong
- Caromatan
- Inudaran
- Kulasihan
- Libertad
- Lumbac
- Manga
- Matampay
- Mukas
- Muntay
- Pagalungan
- Palao
- Pantaon
- Pantar
- Poblacion
- Rebucon
- Riverside
- San Roque
- Santo Niño
- Simbuco
- Small Banisilon
- Sucodan
- Tabigue
- Titunod

=== Climate ===
Climate data for Kolambugan, Lanao del Norte
Month	Jan	Feb	Mar	Apr	May	Jun	Jul	Aug	Sep	Oct	Nov	Dec	Year
Mean daily maximum °C (°F)	29 (84)	30 (86)	31 (88)	31 (88)	30 (86)	30 (86)	29 (84)	30 (86)	30 (86)	30 (86)	30 (86)	30 (86)	30 (86)
Mean daily minimum °C (°F)	22 (72)	22 (72)	22 (72)	23 (73)	24 (75)	24 (75)	24 (75)	24 (75)	24 (75)	24 (75)	23 (73)	23 (73)	23 (74)
Average precipitation mm (inches)	69 (2.7)	58 (2.3)	67 (2.6)	60 (2.4)	109 (4.3)	114 (4.5)	83 (3.3)	78 (3.1)	76 (3.0)	92 (3.6)	86 (3.4)	63 (2.5)	955 (37.7)
Average rainy days	12.8	11.6	14.8	17.4	24.8	23.5	20.7	18.5	17.4	22.5	21.6	15.6	221.2
Source: Meteoblue

== History ==
Originally and before the Spanish and later American Invasions, majority of the people living in Kolambugan belonged to the Maranao Tribe. According to folk stories from the old leaders of Kolambugan during the Spanish occupation, some of the leaders from the interior areas of Lanao del Norte usually crossed the beach of the municipality of Kolambugan to the beach of Ozamiz City by boat. These leaders did this to abduct people living in the other side of the bay and enslave them. In Maranaw term, these slaves were called "Bisaya".

After a long social process, sometime in 1935 – 1944, under the National Land Settlement Administration (NLSA) of the Commonwealth Government, there was a Philippine House of Representative proposal to invade Mindanao so that some parts of it can be used to help the Philippine Government. Not everyone was agreeable to this proposal and one of the oppositions during that time was Congressman Datu Salipada Khalid Pendatun. However, said proposal was approved and signed by then President Manuel L. Quezon. The settlers came from the islands of Luzon and Visayas and they brought with them knowledge and experience of Agriculture, Technical, Farming, Lumber, Carpenter, etc. The first batch transport were landed to the following areas:

- Some parts of Zamboanga Peninsula
- Misamis Occidental
- Lanao del Norte
- Misamis Oriental
- Some parts of Surigao
- Some parts of Davao
- Some Parts of Cotabato

In Lanao del Norte, the transport of settlers was peacefully successful due to the smooth negotiations with the Maranao Tribal Leaders and Land Lords. As a welcome sign, the Land lords donated pieces of land (a piece of land at the time were more than 5 hectares) to start the settlers' new life. In return, the settlers worked for the land owners, and were gifted a small piece of land. Some say that the settlers traded items with the land lords in exchange for a piece of land. Several settlers married with the descendants of the land lords, until the majority of the population in Lanao del Norte and Misamis Oriental has Maranao Tribe blood (Muslim Blood).

Executive Order No. 37, s. 1936, signed on June 4, 1936, prompted the organization of the municipal districts of Kolambugan and Buruun into an independent municipality.

On July 1, 1936, by virtue and power of the Executive Order No. 37, President Manuel L. Quezon declared Kolambugan as one of the municipalities of Lanao. The Lanao province was then further divided into Lanao del Norte and Lanao del Sur.

In 1956, the barrios of Tangcal, Berowar, Pangao, Tawinian, Lumbac, Lawigadato, Somyorang, Bayabao, Pilingkingan, Ramain, Bagigicon, Lamaosa, Meladoc Big, Meladoc Small, and Rarab, then part of Kolambugan, was constituted into the municipal district of Tangcal.

Formerly the largest town in the province, the following towns/barrios were separated from Kolambugan:

- Tubod (October 17, 1946)
  - Lala (March 22, 1949)
  - Baroy (June 10, 1949, note that according to the act, additional land was to be given to Tubod and Baroy)
    - Salvador (January 13, 1960)
- Bacolod (May 10, 1956)
- Tangcal (June 16, 1956, as a Mun District)
- Maigo [with Bacolod] (February 27, 1959)
- Magsaysay [with Tubod, Tangcal] (March 22, 1960, as a Mun District)

=== Name of Barangays from Maranao Tribe Terms ===
On the hand, the settlement has going problem and conflict between Non-Muslim and Muslim when Martial Law is implemented.

- Bubong
- Caromatan
- Inudaran
- Lumbac
- Manga
- Matampay
- Pagalungan
- Palao
- Pantaon
- Pantar
- Rebucon
- Banisilon

== Demographics ==
Population census of Kolambugan
Year	Pop.	±% p.a.
1918	4,874	—
1939	39,647	+10.50%
1948	21,608	−6.52%
1960	12,917	−4.20%
1970	14,318	+1.03%
1975	15,883	+2.10%
1980	19,321	+4.00%
1990	22,533	+1.55%
1995	24,645	+1.69%
2000	24,180	−0.41%
2007	25,306	+0.63%
2010	26,445	+1.62%
2015	27,005	+0.40%
2020	28,265	+0.96%
2024	28,545	+0.24%
Source: Philippine Statistics Authority

== Economy ==
Poverty incidence of Kolambugan (%)

Source: Philippine Statistics Authority

== Government ==
Mayors after People Power Revolution 1986:

- 1986–1989, Ursecio Ridao
- 1989–1992, Ursecio Ridao
- 1992–1995, Ursecio Ridao
- 1995–1998,
- 1998–2001, Angelito Enriquez
- 2001–2002, Dr. Gregorio Z. Cardona Sr. (deceased)
- 2002–2004, Bertrand M. Lumaque
- 2004–2007, Bertrand M. Lumaque
- 2007–2010, Bertrand M. Lumaque
- 2010–2013, Bertrand M. Lumaque
- 2013–2016, Lorenzo V. Manigos
- 2016–2019, Lorenzo V. Manigos
- 2019–July 1, 2022, Lorenzo V. Manigos
- July 1, 2022 – present, Allan M. Omamos

Vice Mayors after People Power Revolution 1986:

- 1986–1989,
- 1989–1992,
- 1992–1995,
- 1995–1998, Dr. Gregorio Z. Cardona Sr.
- 1998–2001, Dr. Gregorio Z. Cardona Sr.
- 2001–2004, Bertrand M. Lumaque
- 2004–2007, Lorenzo V. Manigos
- 2007–2010, Lorenzo V. Manigos
- 2010–2013,
- 2013–2016, Bertrand M. Lumaque
- 2016–2019, Bertrand M. Lumaque
- 2019 – present, Diosdado Mendoza
