= Kapatagan, Lanao del Norte =

Municipality in Lanao del Norte, Philippines

Kapatagan
- Municipality
- Municipality of Kapatagan
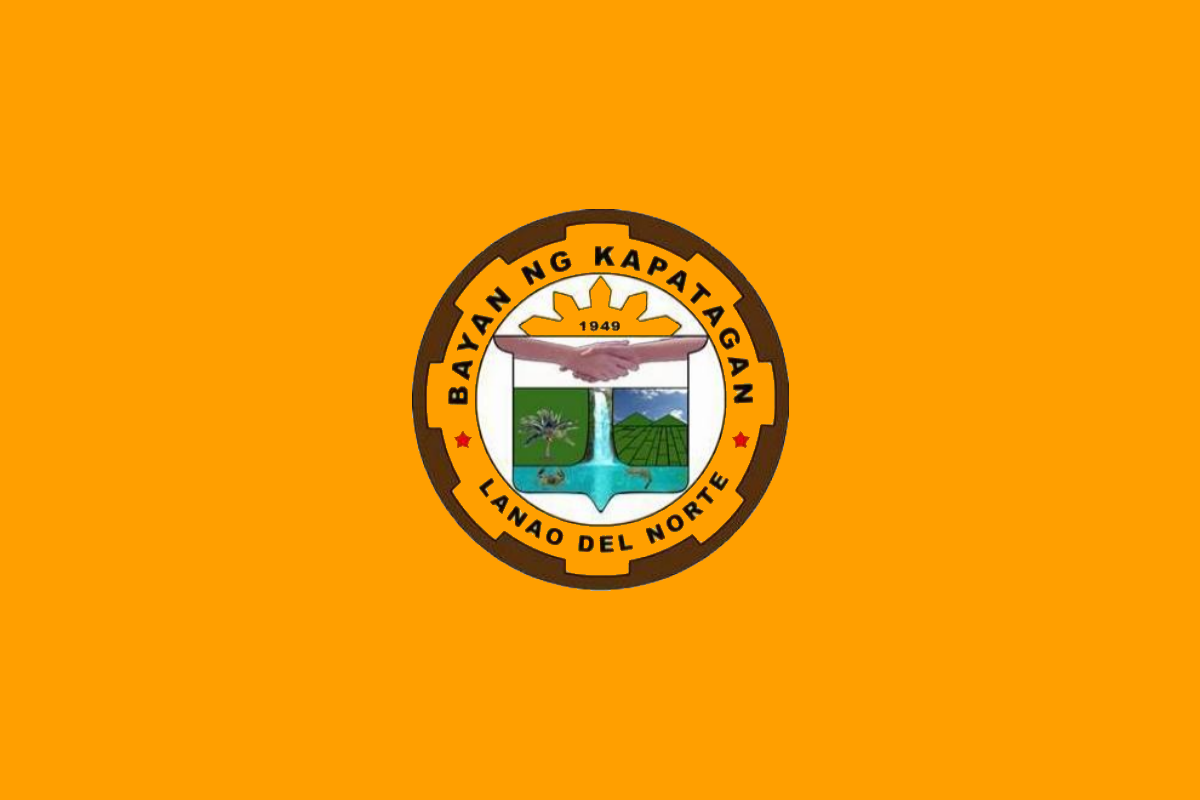
- Flag Seal
- Motto(s): Bolder, Brighter, Better Kapatagan
- Anthem: Kapatagan Hymn
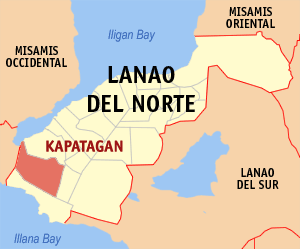
- Map of Lanao del Norte with Kapatagan highlighted
- Interactive map of Kapatagan
- Location within the Philippines
- Coordinates: 7°54′N 123°46′E
- Country: Philippines
- Region: Northern Mindanao
- Province: Lanao del Norte
- District: 2nd district
- Founded: July 5, 1949
- Barangays: 33 (see Barangays)

Government
  - Type: Sangguniang Bayan
  - Mayor: Beth Baguio - Ali
  - Vice Mayor: Barry Y. Baguio
  - Representative: Sittie Aminah Q. Dimaporo
  - Municipal Council: Members: Christine Atay; Bryan Indoc; Jojo Oredimo; Nonong Tubongbanua; Leonilo Gorecho; Claire Te; Jose Te; Benjie Vergara
  - Electorate: 35,202 voters (2025)

Area
  - Total: 242.89 km^{2} (93.78 sq mi)
- Elevation: 45 m (148 ft)
- Highest elevation: 311 m (1,020 ft)
- Lowest elevation: 4 m (13 ft)

Population (2024 census)
  - Total: 72,762
  - Density: 299.57/km^{2} (775.88/sq mi)
  - Households: 15,858

Economy
  - Income class: 1st municipal income class
  - Poverty incidence: 27.95% (2023)
  - Revenue: ₱ 323.2 million (2024)
  - Assets: ₱ 923 million (2024)
  - Expenditure: ₱ 336.9 million (2024)
  - Liabilities: ₱ 482.1 million (2024)

Service provider
  - Electricity: Lanao del Norte Electric Cooperative (LANECO)
- Time zone: UTC+8 (PST)
- ZIP code: 9214
- PSGC: 1003505000
- IDD : area code: +63 (0)63
- Native languages: Maranao; Cebuano; Binukid; Tagalog
- Website: lungsodsakapatagan.gov.ph.

Kapatagan, officially the Municipality of Kapatagan (Maranao: Inged a Kapatagan; Cebuano: Lungsod sa Kapatagan; Tagalog: Bayan ng Kapatagan), is a municipality in the province of Lanao del Norte, Philippines. According to the 2024 census, it has a population of 72,762 people.

== Etymology ==
Kapatagan is derived from the Visayan word "patag" meaning plain or valley.

== Geography ==
Kapatagan has a total land area of 25,048.41 hectares, including the area now being contested by the municipality of Lala with an approximate area of 759 hectares.

=== Topography ===
On the southern and eastern sides of the locality are mountains. Offsetting the mountain is the presence of flat coastal lands and valley.

It has five major rivers that flow to Panguil Bay, namely: Maranding, Panoloon, Butadon, Kidalos, and Balili.

The Cathedral Falls and Santa Cruz waterfalls are located at Barangays Cathedral Falls, Santa Cruz, and Waterfalls respectively. At present, the spring supplies water into Poblacion and some neighboring barangays.

=== Barangays ===
Kapatagan is politically subdivided into 33 barangays. Each barangay consists of puroks while some have sitios.

- Bagong Badian
- Bagong Silang
- Balili
- Bansarvil
- Belis
- Buenavista
- Butadon
- Cathedral Falls
- Concepcion
- Curvada
- De Asis
- Donggoan
- Durano
- Kahayagan
- Kidalos
- La Libertad
- Lapinig
- Mahayahay
- Malinas
- Maranding
- Margos
- Poblacion
- Pulang Yuta
- San Isidro
- San Vicente
- Santa Cruz
- Santo Tomas
- Suso
- Taguitic
- Tiacongan
- Tipolo
- Tulatulahan
- Waterfalls

=== Climate ===
Climate data for Kapatagan, Lanao del Norte
Month	Jan	Feb	Mar	Apr	May	Jun	Jul	Aug	Sep	Oct	Nov	Dec	Year
Mean daily maximum °C (°F)	29 (84)	30 (86)	31 (88)	31 (88)	30 (86)	30 (86)	29 (84)	30 (86)	30 (86)	30 (86)	30 (86)	29 (84)	30 (86)
Mean daily minimum °C (°F)	22 (72)	22 (72)	22 (72)	23 (73)	24 (75)	24 (75)	24 (75)	24 (75)	24 (75)	24 (75)	23 (73)	23 (73)	23 (74)
Average precipitation mm (inches)	69 (2.7)	58 (2.3)	67 (2.6)	60 (2.4)	109 (4.3)	114 (4.5)	83 (3.3)	78 (3.1)	76 (3.0)	92 (3.6)	86 (3.4)	63 (2.5)	955 (37.7)
Average rainy days	12.8	11.6	14.8	17.4	24.8	23.5	20.7	18.5	17.4	22.5	21.6	15.6	221.2
Source: Meteoblue

The Municipality has a tropical climate. The dry season starts in October and ends in June. Wet season begins in July and ends in December.

== Demographics ==
Population census of Kapatagan
Year	Pop.	±% p.a.
1918	1,825	—
1939	2,677	+1.84%
1948	14,103	+20.28%
1960	32,060	+7.08%
1970	20,140	−4.54%
1975	21,055	+0.90%
1980	25,303	+3.74%
1990	33,397	+2.81%
1995	37,006	+1.94%
2000	42,783	+3.16%
2007	49,134	+1.93%
2010	53,916	+3.44%
2015	62,853	+2.96%
2020	62,571	−0.09%
2024	{{PH census pop n|2024}}	—
Source: Philippine Statistics Authority

== Economy ==
Poverty incidence of Kapatagan (%)

Source: Philippine Statistics Authority

== Healthcare ==
- Kapatagan Provincial Hospital
- Delbert Jon's Polyclinic
- SMS Yonson Medical Clinic
- Dr. Mendoza Clinic
- Dental Clinics and Diagnostic Centers

== Telecommunication ==
- Globe Telecom
- COV Internet Installation Services
- Smart Communications
- PLDT
- Dito Telecommunity

== Tourism ==
- Cathedral Waterfalls
- Durano Mountain Resort
- Cathedral Falls Water World
- Siete Paradise Mountain Resort
- Santa Cruz Waterfalls
- La Libertad Man Made Lake
- Kahayagan Observation Deck

== Notable personalities ==
- Marlon Tapales - Professional Boxer
- Bonel Balingit - Professional Basketball player, Actor
