= Salvador, Lanao del Norte =

Municipality in Lanao del Norte, Philippines

Salvador
- Municipality
- Municipality of Salvador
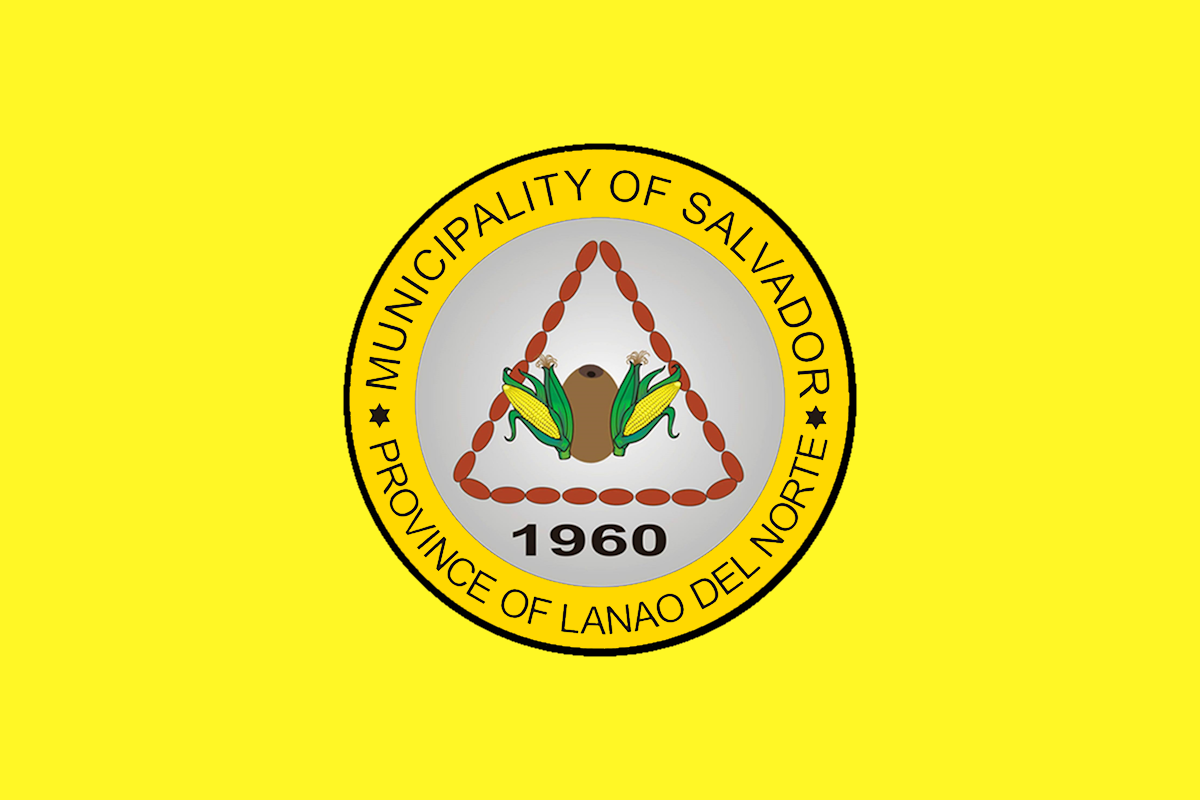
- Flag Seal

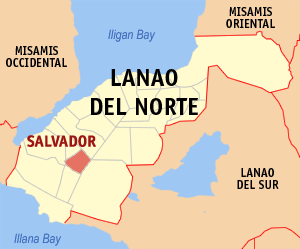
- Map of Lanao del Norte with Salvador highlighted
- Interactive map of Salvador
- Location within the Philippines
- Coordinates: 7°54′13″N 123°50′29″E
- Country: Philippines
- Region: Northern Mindanao
- Province: Lanao del Norte
- District: 2nd district
- Founded: January 13, 1960
- Barangays: 25 (see Barangays)

Government
  - Type: Sangguniang Bayan
  - Mayor: Hassanor L. Tawantawan
  - Vice Mayor: Everto S. Tabera
  - Representative: Sittie Aminah Dimaporo
  - Municipal Council: Members: Badelles T. Mangontawar; Mawi T. Tawantawan; Merlyn C. Genetiano; Musa P. Tandayao; Diosdado C. Panal; Whey-am S. Macaayao; Abulkhair M. Noron; Jaime M. Generalao
  - Electorate: 13,363 voters (2025)

Area
  - Total: 113.99 km^{2} (44.01 sq mi)
- Elevation: 69 m (226 ft)
- Highest elevation: 347 m (1,138 ft)
- Lowest elevation: 12 m (39 ft)

Population (2024 census)
  - Total: 34,053
  - Density: 298.74/km^{2} (773.72/sq mi)
  - Households: 8,245

Economy
  - Income class: 3rd municipal income class
  - Poverty incidence: 37.21% (2023)
  - Revenue: ₱ 143.6 million (2024)
  - Assets: ₱ 295.4 million (2024)
  - Expenditure: ₱ 134.4 million (2024)
  - Liabilities: ₱ 70.84 million (2024)

Service provider
  - Electricity: Lanao del Norte Electric Cooperative (LANECO)
- Time zone: UTC+8 (PST)
- ZIP code: 9212
- PSGC: 1003518000
- IDD : area code: +63 (0)63
- Native languages: Maranao; Cebuano; Binukid; Tagalog
- Website: www.salvadorldn.gov.ph

Salvador, officially the Municipality of Salvador (Maranao: Inged a Salvador; Cebuano: Lungsod sa Salvador; Tagalog: Bayan ng Salvador), is a municipality in the province of Lanao del Norte, Philippines. According to the 2024 census, it has a population of 34,053 people.

== History ==
Salvador was created from Baroy through Executive Order No. 370 signed by President Carlos P. Garcia on January 13, 1960.

== Geography ==
=== Barangays ===
Salvador is politically subdivided into 25 barangays. Each barangay consists of puroks while some have sitios.

- Barandia
- Bulacon
- Buntong
- Calimodan
- Camp Alere
- Camp III
- Curva-Miagao
- Daligdigan
- Inasagan
- Kilala
- Mabatao
- Madaya
- Mamaanon
- Makaupaw
- Mapantao
- Mindalano
- Padianan
- Pagalongan
- Pagayawan
- Panaliwad-on
- Pangantapan
- Pansur
- Patidon
- Pawak
- Poblacion
- Saumay
- Sudlon

=== Climate ===
Climate data for Salvador, Lanao del Norte
Month	Jan	Feb	Mar	Apr	May	Jun	Jul	Aug	Sep	Oct	Nov	Dec	Year
Mean daily maximum °C (°F)	27 (81)	27 (81)	28 (82)	30 (86)	30 (86)	29 (84)	29 (84)	29 (84)	29 (84)	29 (84)	28 (82)	27 (81)	29 (83)
Mean daily minimum °C (°F)	22 (72)	22 (72)	22 (72)	22 (72)	23 (73)	23 (73)	23 (73)	23 (73)	23 (73)	23 (73)	23 (73)	22 (72)	23 (73)
Average precipitation mm (inches)	69 (2.7)	44 (1.7)	37 (1.5)	29 (1.1)	87 (3.4)	137 (5.4)	131 (5.2)	141 (5.6)	143 (5.6)	134 (5.3)	68 (2.7)	53 (2.1)	1,073 (42.3)
Average rainy days	9.9	7.6	7.4	8.1	21.6	26.5	26.4	26.6	25.8	24.3	15.1	10.4	209.7
Source: Meteoblue

== Demographics ==
Population census of Salvador
Year	Pop.	±% p.a.
1960	8,917	—
1970	10,813	+1.94%
1975	5,857	−11.57%
1980	10,557	+12.50%
1990	13,576	+2.55%
1995	14,834	+1.67%
2000	17,055	+3.04%
2007	23,222	+4.35%
2010	27,348	+6.13%
2015	31,845	+2.94%
2020	32,115	+0.18%
2024	34,053	+1.42%
Source: Philippine Statistics Authority

History Founded on January 13, 1960 when the then Provincial Governor Salvador Lluch sponsored a resolution for the creation of a new municipality out of Baroy, Lanao del Norte.

== Economy ==
Poverty incidence of Salvador (%)

Source: Philippine Statistics Authority
