= Matungao =

Municipality in Lanao del Norte, Philippines

Matungao ماتونجاو
- Municipality
- Municipality of Matungao
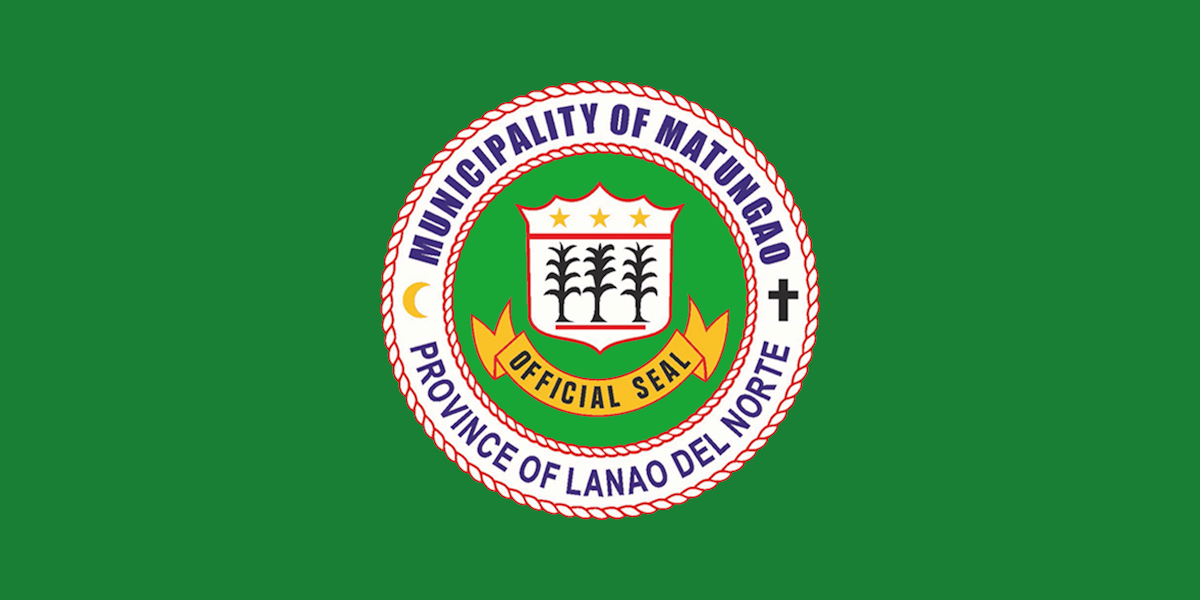
- Flag Seal

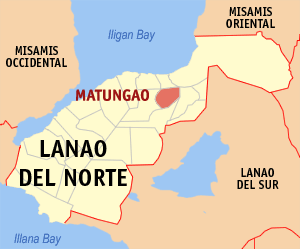
- Map of Lanao del Norte with Matungao highlighted
- Interactive map of Matungao
- Location within the Philippines
- Coordinates: 8°08′N 124°10′E
- Country: Philippines
- Region: Northern Mindanao
- Province: Lanao del Norte
- District: 1st district
- Founded: June 20, 1949
- Barangays: 12 (see Barangays)

Government
  - Type: Sangguniang Bayan
  - Mayor: Aisha M. Azis
  - Vice Mayor: Jaber M. Azis
  - Representative: Mohamad Khalid Q. Dimaporo
  - Municipal Council: Members: Saiben M. Azis; Nahder W. H. Adato; Hanief Canapia M. Sanggacala; Faizal C. Maba; Amroden C. Monib; Jhaminor P. Sanggacala; Calil M. Limpao; Daud M. Sarip
  - Electorate: 8,415 voters (2025)

Area
  - Total: 45.74 km^{2} (17.66 sq mi)
- Elevation: 313 m (1,027 ft)
- Highest elevation: 570 m (1,870 ft)
- Lowest elevation: 17 m (56 ft)

Population (2024 census)
  - Total: 16,404
  - Density: 358.6/km^{2} (928.9/sq mi)
  - Households: 2,645

Economy
  - Income class: 4th municipal income class
  - Poverty incidence: 49.94% (2023)
  - Revenue: ₱ 98.47 million (2024)
  - Assets: ₱ 194 million (2024)
  - Expenditure: ₱ 83.16 million (2024)
  - Liabilities: ₱ 20.42 million (2024)

Service provider
  - Electricity: Lanao del Norte Electric Cooperative (LANECO)
- Time zone: UTC+8 (PST)
- ZIP code: 9203
- PSGC: 1003513000
- IDD : area code: +63 (0)63
- Native languages: Maranao; Cebuano; Binukid; Tagalog
- Website: www.matungaoldn.gov.ph

Matungao, officially the Municipality of Matungao (Maranao: Inged a Matungao; Cebuano: Lungsod sa Matungao; Tagalog: Bayan ng Matungao), is a municipality in the province of Lanao del Norte, Philippines. According to the 2024 census, it has a population of 16,404 people, making it the least populated municipality in the province.

The word Matungao literally means cold in Maranao language. This municipality is known for peaceful relations between Muslims and Christians and supports Maranao culture. Matungao stages annually the Maranao courtship dance in the Kapagtota Festival.

== History ==
Executive Order No. 230, s. 1949, signed on June 20, 1949: "...the barrios of Nunang, Matungao, Matampai, Pasayanon, Pangi, Somiorang, Batangan, Bangco, and Batal, all of the municipal district of Pantao Ragat, Province of Lanao, are hereby organized into an independent municipal district under the name of Matungao with the seat of government at the barrio of Matungao."

== Geography ==
=== Barangays ===
Matungao is politically subdivided into 12 barangays. Each barangay consists of puroks while some have sitios.

- Bubong Radapan
- Bangco
- Batal
- Batangan
- Cadayonan
- Matampay
- Pangi
- Pasayanon
- Poblacion (Matungao)
- Puntod
- Santa Cruz
- Somiorang

=== Climate ===
Climate data for Matungao, Lanao del Norte
Month	Jan	Feb	Mar	Apr	May	Jun	Jul	Aug	Sep	Oct	Nov	Dec	Year
Mean daily maximum °C (°F)	29 (84)	27 (81)	27 (81)	28 (82)	28 (82)	27 (81)	27 (81)	28 (82)	28 (82)	27 (81)	27 (81)	27 (81)	28 (82)
Mean daily minimum °C (°F)	22 (72)	22 (72)	22 (72)	23 (73)	24 (75)	23 (73)	23 (73)	23 (73)	23 (73)	23 (73)	23 (73)	22 (72)	23 (73)
Average precipitation mm (inches)	159 (6.3)	143 (5.6)	166 (6.5)	183 (7.2)	357 (14.1)	414 (16.3)	333 (13.1)	309 (12.2)	289 (11.4)	285 (11.2)	253 (10.0)	166 (6.5)	3,057 (120.4)
Average rainy days	18.4	17.2	20.6	23.4	29.3	29.2	29.9	29.4	27.7	28.7	25.5	19.9	299.2
Source: Meteoblue

== Demographics ==
Population census of Matungao
Year	Pop.	±% p.a.
1960	9,391	—
1970	10,315	+0.94%
1975	12,373	+3.72%
1980	4,836	−17.12%
1990	7,264	+4.15%
1995	8,451	+2.88%
2000	9,266	+1.99%
2007	9,984	+1.03%
2010	12,217	+7.62%
2015	13,975	+2.59%
2020	14,756	+1.15%
2024	16,404	+2.57%
Source: Philippine Statistics Authority

== Economy ==
Poverty incidence of Matungao (%)

Source: Philippine Statistics Authority

== Government ==
Mayors after People Power Revolution 1986:

- 1986 - 1992,
- 1992 - 1995,
- 1995 - 1998,
- 1998 - 2001,
- 2001 - 2004,
- 2004 - 2007,
- 2007 - 2010,
- 2010 - 2013,
- 2013 - 2016, Aisha Mangotara-Azis
- 2016 - present, Aisha Mangotara-Azis
