= Legislative districts of Lanao del Norte =

Legislative districts of the Philippines

The legislative districts of Lanao del Norte are the representations of the province of Lanao del Norte in the various national legislatures of the Philippines. The province is currently represented in the lower house of the Congress of the Philippines through its first and second congressional districts.

The highly urbanized city of Iligan last formed part of its representation in 2010.

== History ==
Prior to gaining separate representation, areas now under the jurisdiction of Lanao del Norte were represented under the Department of Mindanao and Sulu (1917–1935) and the historical Lanao Province (1935–1961).

The enactment of Republic Act No. 2228 on 22 May 1959 divided the old Lanao Province into Lanao del Norte and Lanao del Sur, and provided them each with a congressional representative. In accordance with Section 8 of R.A. 2228, the incumbent representative of Lanao Province, Laurentino Badelles, continued to represent both successor provinces until the next general election in 1961. The chartered city of Iligan, despite being enumerated as part of the territory of neither successor province, was designated as Lanao del Norte's seat of provincial government and became part of its congressional representation.

Lanao del Norte was represented in the Interim Batasang Pambansa as part of Region XII from 1978 to 1984. The province returned one representative, elected at large, to the Regular Batasang Pambansa in 1984. Iligan, declared a highly urbanized city in 1983, separately elected its own representative in this election.

Under the new Constitution which was proclaimed on 11 February 1987, Lanao del Norte was once more grouped with Iligan and reapportioned into two congressional districts, which elected their respective members to the restored House of Representatives starting that same year.

The passage of Republic Act No. 9724 on 20 October 2009, segregated the highly urbanized city of Iligan from the first district of Lanao del Norte to form its own congressional district starting in the 2010 elections. Republic Act No. 9774, enacted on 17 November 2009, further reapportioned Lanao del Norte's districts by transferring the municipalities of Balo-i, Matungao, Pantar and Tagoloan from the second to the first district. The reconfigured districts elected their representatives beginning in the 2010 elections.

== 1st District ==
- Municipalities: Bacolod, Balo-i, Baroy, Kauswagan, Kolambugan, Linamon, Maigo, Matungao, Pantar, Tagoloan, Tubod
- Population (2015): 295,473

Period	Representative
15th Congress; 2010–2013	Imelda D.C. Quibranza-Dimaporo
16th Congress; 2013–2016	Imelda D.C. Quibranza-Dimaporo
17th Congress; 2016–2019	Mohamad Khalid Q. Dimaporo
18th Congress; 2019–2022	Mohamad Khalid Q. Dimaporo
19th Congress; 2022–2025	Mohamad Khalid Q. Dimaporo

=== 1987–2010 ===
- City: Iligan
- Municipalities: Bacolod, Baroy, Kauswagan, Kolambugan, Linamon, Maigo, Tubod

Period	Representative
8th Congress; 1987–1992	Mariano Ll. Badelles, Sr.
9th Congress; 1992–1995	Mariano Ll. Badelles, Sr.
10th Congress; 1995–1998	Mariano Ll. Badelles, Sr.
11th Congress; 1998–2001	Alipio Cirilo V. Badelles
12th Congress; 2001–2004	Alipio Cirilo V. Badelles
13th Congress; 2004–2007	Alipio Cirilo V. Badelles
14th Congress; 2007–2010	Vicente F. Belmonte, Jr.

== 2nd District ==
- Municipalities: Kapatagan, Lala, Magsaysay, Munai, Nunungan, Pantao Ragat, Poona Piagapo, Salvador, Sapad, Sultan Naga Dimaporo, Tangcal
- Population (2015): 380,922

Period	Representative
15th Congress; 2010–2013	Fatima Aliah Q. Dimaporo
16th Congress; 2013–2016	Abdullah D. Dimaporo
17th Congress; 2016–2019	Abdullah D. Dimaporo
18th Congress; 2019–2022	Abdullah D. Dimaporo
19th Congress; 2022–2025	Sittie Aminah Q. Dimaporo

=== 1987–2010 ===
- Municipalities: Balo-i, Kapatagan, Lala, Magsaysay, Matungao, Munai, Nunungan, Pantao Ragat, Pantar, Poona Piagapo, Salvador, Sapad, Sultan Naga Dimaporo, Tagoloan, Tangcal

Period	Representative
8th Congress; 1987–1992	Abdullah D. Dimaporo (Note: Resigned on 12 December 1989, to run for Governor of the Autonomous Region in Muslim Mindanao; seat remained vacant until the end of the 8th Congress.)
8th Congress; 1987–1992	vacant
9th Congress; 1992–1995	Macabangkit B. Lanto (Note: Unseated in 1994 after losing electoral protest to Mario Hisuler.)
9th Congress; 1992–1995	Mario E. Hisuler (Note: Replaced Macabangkit Lanto after winning electoral protest; took oath of office on 5 October 1994, and served for the remainder of the 9th Congress.)
10th Congress; 1995–1998	Abdullah S. Mangotara
11th Congress; 1998–2001	Abdullah S. Mangotara
12th Congress; 2001–2004	Abdullah D. Dimaporo
13th Congress; 2004–2007	Abdullah D. Dimaporo
14th Congress; 2007–2010	Abdullah D. Dimaporo

== Lone District (defunct) ==
- includes the chartered city of Iligan

Period	Representative
5th Congress; 1961–1965	Laurentino Ll. Badelles
6th Congress; 1965–1969	Mohammad Ali B. Dimaporo
7th Congress; 1969–1972	Mohammad Ali B. Dimaporo

== At-Large (defunct) ==
- excludes the highly urbanized city of Iligan

Period	Representative
Regular Batasang Pambansa; 1984–1986	Abdullah D. Dimaporo

== See also ==
- Legislative district of Mindanao and Sulu
- Legislative district of Lanao
- Legislative district of Iligan
