= List of executive orders by Carlos P. Garcia =

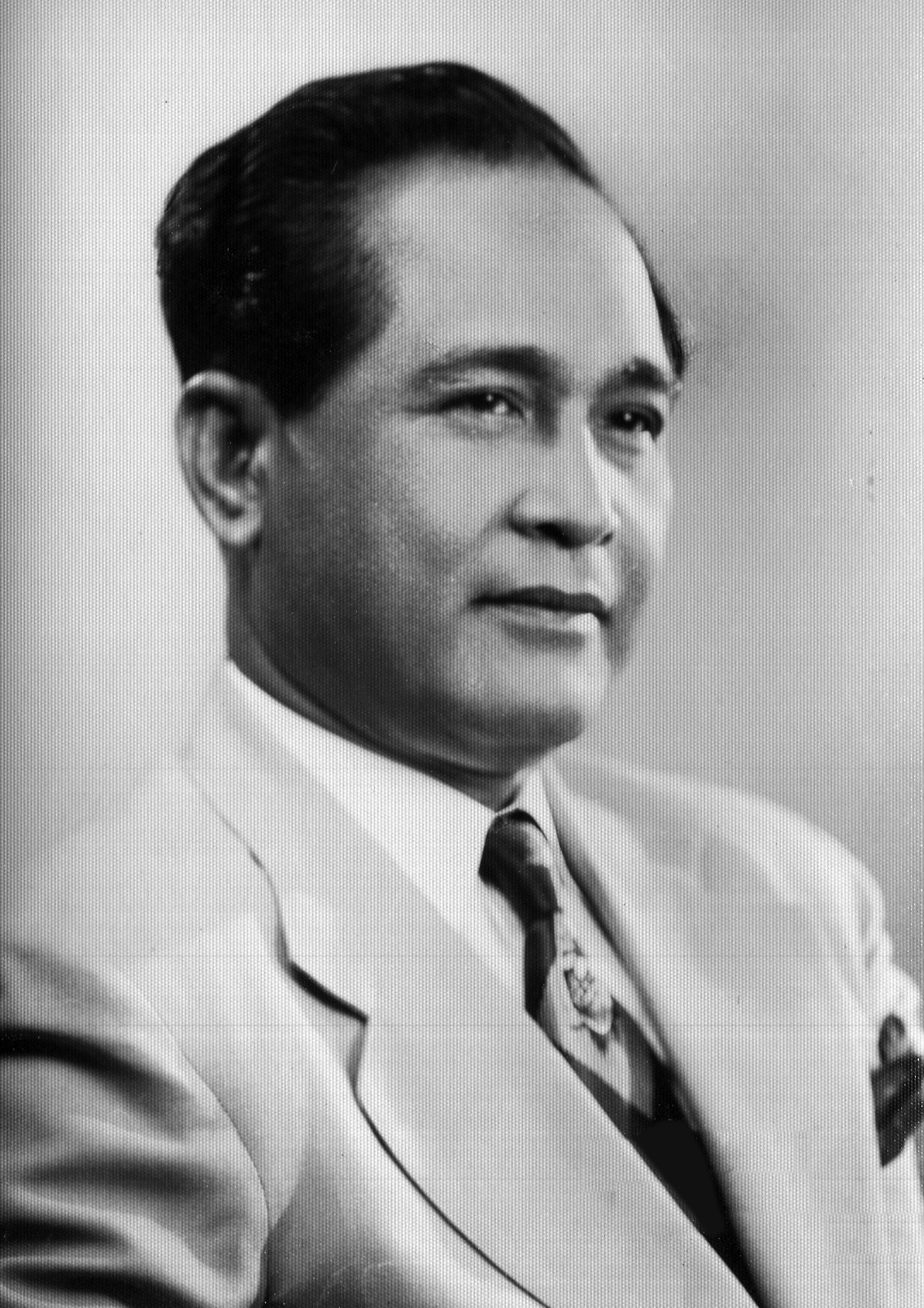
Philippine President Carlos P. Garcia

Listed below are executive orders signed by Philippine President Carlos P. Garcia (1957–1961).

== 1957 ==
| No. | Title | Date signed |
|---|---|---|
| 244 | Fixing office hours during the hot season | March 26, 1957 |
| 245 | Creating the barrio of Legayada in the municipality of Lambunao, province of Iloilo | March 30, 1957 |
| 246 | Fixing the schedule of burial expenses of persons in the Government service in case of death from injuries received or sickness contracted in performance of duty, including prisoners who die while in the custody of the Armed Forces of the Philippines | March 31, 1957 |
| 247 | Creating a Committee of Bankers to look into certain phases of the remittance policy of the Central Bank | May 2, 1957 |
| 248 | Providing for the full and complete transfer of the Civil Aeronautics Administration from the Department of Commerce and Industry to the Department of Public Works and Communications | May 23, 1957 |
| 249 | Creating the municipality of Anao-aon in the province of Surigao | May 24, 1957 |
| 250 | Terminating the collection of tolls on the toll bridges listed hereunder | June 5, 1957 |
| 251 | Prescribing the office hours to be observed in the different bureaus and offices of the Government, including Government-owned or controlled corporations | June 26, 1957 |
| 252 | Amending Executive Order No. 243, dated March 6, 1957, entitled "Condoning the taxes on all real properties located in the province of Cotabato" | June 27, 1957 |
| 253 | Abolishing the committee on the restoration of the Rizal home in Calamba and the Dapitan Park in Zamboanga and transferring its personnel, property, assets, and records to the Jose Rizal National Centennial Commission | June 27, 1957 |
| 254 | Creating the Juan Luna Centennial Commission | June 27, 1957 |
| 255 | Extending the prohibition to slaughter carabaos up to December 31, 1957 | June 23, 1957 |
| 256 | Classifying municipal districts in the Philippines | July 5, 1957 |
| 257 | Providing for the implementing details for Reorganization Plan No. 77 relative to the Forest Products Research Institute | July 5, 1957 |
| 258 | Returning to the municipality of Kolambugan, province of Lanao, certain sitios of the municipal district of Tangcal, same province | July 11, 1957 |
| 259 | Creating the municipality of San Enrique in the province of Iloilo | July 12, 1957 |
| 260 | Regulations governing seniority, promotion, and separation from the service of reserve officers of the Armed Forces of the Philippines | July 24, 1957 |
| 261 | Creating the municipality of Sapang Dalaga in the province of Misamis Occidental | August 12, 1957 |
| 262 | Amending Executive Order No. 253 dated June 27, 1957, entitled "Abolishing the committee on the restoration of the Rizal home in Calamba and the Dapitan Park in Zamboanga and transferring its personnel, property, assets, and records to the Jose Rizal National Centennial Commission" | August 15, 1957 |
| 263 | Creating the Pinaglabanan Commemorative Commission | August 15, 1957 |
| 264 | Creating the municipality of Polomolok in the province of Cotabato | August 21, 1957 |
| 265 | Creating the municipality of Padre Burgos in the province of Leyte | August 29, 1957 |
| 266 | Creating the municipality of Isulan in the province of Cotabato | August 30, 1957 |
| 267 | Amending Executive Order No. 82, series of 1947, so as to fix the seat of government of the municipality of Nuling, province of Cotabato, between Kilometers 9 and 10 instead of between Kilometers 12 and 13 of the Cotabato-Davao National Highway at barrio Dalumangcob in said municipality | September 2, 1957 |
| 268 | Creating the municipality of San Pablo in the province of Zamboanga del Sur | September 17, 1957 |
| 269 | Creating the municipality of Tubod in the province of Surigao | September 18, 1957 |
| 270 | Creating the municipality of San Antonio in the province of Quezon | October 4, 1957 |
| 271 | Creating a Presidential Incentives Committee | October 4, 1957 |
| 272 | Converting the municipal districts of Baungon, Kibawe, Libona, Maramag, and Sumilao, all in the province of Bukidnon, into municipalities in the same province | October 4, 1957 |
| 273 | Creating the municipality of Lapuyan in the province of Zamboanga del Sur | October 16, 1957 |
| 274 | Creating the municipality of Olutanga in the province of Zamboanga del Sur | October 16, 1957 |
| 275 | Transferring the seat of government of the municipality of Jose Abad Santos, province of Davao, from the barrio of Butulan to the barrio of Caburan, same municipality | October 18, 1957 |
| 276 | Amending Executive Order No. 254 dated June 27, 1957, entitled "Creating the Juan Luna Centennial Commission" | October 31, 1957 |
| 277 | Providing for the implementing details for Reorganization Plan No. 1-A relative to position classification | November 7, 1957 |
| 278 | Providing for the implementing details for Reorganization Plan No. 2-A relative to standardized pay | November 7, 1957 |
| 279 | Providing for the implementing details for Reorganization Plans Nos. 3-A, 19-A, 46-A, and 47-A relative to the Budget Commission | November 7, 1957 |
| 280 | Waiving the additional progressive taxes to be collected from, and paid by, proprietors and operators of certain sugar mills for the crop year 1956–1957 | November 19, 1957 |
| 281 | Amending Executive Order No. 271, dated October 4, 1957, entitled, "Creating a Presidential Incentives Committee" | December 18, 1957 |
| 282 | Creating the municipality of Tambulig in the province of Zamboanga del Sur | December 27, 1957 |
| 283 | Creating the municipality of Dumingag in the province of Zamboanga del Sur | December 27, 1957 |
| 284 | Extending the prohibition to slaughter carabaos up to June 30, 1958 | December 30, 1957 |

== 1958 ==
| No. | Title | Date signed |
|---|---|---|
| 285 | Opening the port of Parang, Cotabato, as a subport of entry | January 16, 1958 |
| 286 | Reclassifying all chartered cities, except Manila, Baguio, and Quezon cities | January 31, 1958 |
| 287 | Regulating the registration of, and assignment of number plates to, motor vehicles used by officials of the Republic of the Philippines and accredited representatives of foreign states | February 6, 1958 |
| 288 | Providing for the implementing details for Reorganization Plans Nos. 12-A, 13-A, and 14-A relative to health | February 20, 1958 |
| 289 | Creating a National Committee on Food Production to foster and effect coordination and integration of activities of all bureaus, offices, and Government agencies in the implementation of the food production campaign | March 10, 1958 |
| 290 | Providing for the implementing details for Reorganization Plans Nos. 4-A, 5-A, 7-A, 8-A, and 9-A relative to administrative services | March 14, 1958 |
| 291 | Providing for the implementing details for Reorganization Plan No. 54-A relative to intelligence coordination | March 14, 1958 |
| 292 | Fixing office hours during the hot season | March 26, 1958 |
| 293 | Creating the President's Law Enforcement Unit for Southern Philippines | April 10, 1958 |
| 294 | Creating the position of Special Assistant to the President on Science Coordination | April 15, 1958 |
| 295 | Creating the municipality of Sulop in the province of Davao | April 24, 1958 |
| 296 | Amending Section 5 of Executive Order No. 278, dated November 7, 1957, entitled "Providing for the implementing details for Reorganization Plan No. 2-A relative to standardization pay" | May 14, 1958 |
| 297 | Creating a Council of State | May 14, 1958 |
| 298 | Amending Executive Order No. 272, dated October 4, 1957, entitled "Converting the municipal districts of Baungon, Kibawe, Libona, Maramag, and Sumilao, all in the province of Bukidnon, into municipalities in the same province" | May 18, 1958 |
| 299 | Creating an Advisory Committee on the Tobacco Industry | May 21, 1958 |
| 300 | Amending Executive Order No. 263, dated August 15, 1957, entitled "Creating the Pinaglabanan Commemorative Commission" | May 29, 1958 |
| 301 | Transferring the seat of government of the municipality of Escalante, province of Negros Occidental, from its present site at the poblacion to the barrio of Balintawak, same municipality | May 30, 1958 |
| 302 | Regulations governing the discharge or separation by administrative action of officers in the Regular Force and reserve officers on extended tour of active duty | May 5, 1958 |
| 303 | Amending Executive Order No. 286, current series, reclassifying all chartered cities, except Manila, Baguio, and Quezon cities, so as to adjust the classification of the city of Basilan | May 5, 1958 |
| 304 | Establishing a voluntary payroll and savings plan for officers and employees of the Philippine Government | May 5, 1958 |
| 305 | Providing instructions to be followed in the conduct of public affairs during the time that the president is outside the Philippines | June 11, 1958 |
| 306 | Creating the Presidential Committee on Administration Performance Efficiency under the Office of the President | July 15, 1958 |
| 307 | Placing the entire island of Pamilacan under the jurisdiction of the municipality of Baclayon, province of Bohol | July 15, 1958 |
| 308 | Creating the municipality of Mahaplag in the province of Leyte | July 21, 1958 |
| 309 | Amending Executive Order No. 269, series of 1957, so as to return to the municipality of Mainit, province of Surigao, the barrio of Siana of the municipality of Tubod, same province | July 24, 1958 |
| 310 | Delegating to the Secretary of Agriculture and Natural Resources and the Under-Secretary for Natural Resources the power to sign patents and certificates | July 31, 1958 |
| 311 | Transferring the seat of government of the municipality of Tagig, province of Rizal, from its present site at the barrio of Santa Ana to the barrio of Tuktukan, same municipality | August 1, 1958 |
| 312 | Directing the payment of salaries of Government officials and employees, including those of Government-owned or controlled corporations, once a week or four times a month | August 6, 1958 |
| 313 | Amending Executive Order No. 467, series of 1951, insofar as the boundaries of the municipalities of Dipolog, Polanco and New Piñan, all of the province of Zamboanga del Norte, are concerned | August 6, 1958 |
| 314 | Creating the municipality of Candoni in the province of Negros Occidental | August 22, 1958 |
| 315 | Prescribing the rules of procedure of the Reparations Commission | September 1, 1958 |
| 316 | Extending the prohibition to slaughter carabaos up to December 31, 1958 | September 1, 1958 |
| 317 | Reconstituting the National Security Council | September 2, 1958 |
| 318 | Further amending the Fourth Paragraph of Executive Order No. 298, dated August 12, 1940, entitled "Prescribing the automatic renewal of contracts, requiring public bidding before entering into new contracts, and providing exceptions therefor," as inserted by Executive Order No. 146, dated December 27, 1955, and amended by Executive Order No. 212, dated November 6, 1956 | September 17, 1958 |
| 319 | Creating a committee to determine the minimum and maximum selling prices of palay and corn for the various regions of the Philippines | November 13, 1958 |
| 320 | Prescribing the rules of procedure of the Reparations Commission | November 14, 1958 |
| 321 | Amending Section 3 of Executive Order No. 278, dated November 7, 1957, entitled "Providing for the implementing details for Reorganization Plan No. 2-A relative to standardized pay" | November 14, 1958 |
| 322 | Providing instructions to be followed in the conduct of public affairs during the time that the president is outside the Philippines | November 29, 1958 |
| 323 | Creating the municipality of Tukuran in the province of Zamboanga del Sur | November 29, 1958 |
| 324 | Annexing the barrio of Tawagan Norte, municipality of Pagadian, Zamboanga del Sur, to the municipality of Labañgan, same province | November 29, 1958 |
| 325 | Amending Executive Order No. 85, series of 1947, insofar as the boundaries between the municipalities of Calamba and Plaridel, both in the province of Misamis Occidental, are concerned | December 10, 1958 |
| 326 | Providing for the implementing details for Reorganization Plan No. 50 relative to social welfare | December 11, 1958 |
| 327 | Extending the prohibition to slaughter carabaos up to June 30, 1959 | December 29, 1958 |

== 1959 ==
| No. | Title | Date signed |
|---|---|---|
| 328 | Revoking Executive Order No. 240, issued on February 16, 1957, abolishing the municipality of Pagudpud in the province of Ilocos Norte | January 14, 1959 |
| 329 | Waiving the additional progressive taxes to be collected from, and paid by, proprietors and operators of certain sugar mills for the crop year 1957–1958 | January 17, 1959 |
| 330 | Creating the barrio of Masaya in the municipality of Bay, province of Laguna | February 16, 1959 |
| 331 | Creating the municipality of Maigo in the province of Lanao | February 27, 1959 |
| 332 | Fixing office hours during the hot season | March 28, 1959 |
| 333 | Reclassifying all municipalities in the Philippines | March 28, 1959 |
| 334 | Amending Executive Order No. 256, series of 1957, classifying municipal districts in the Philippines so as to include certain municipal districts in Abra, Agusan, Lanao and Sulu | March 28, 1959 |
| 335 | Converting the municipal district of Pudtol in the Mountain Province into a municipality | March 31, 1959 |
| 336 | Providing instructions to be followed in the conduct of public affairs during the time that the president is outside the Philippines | April 21, 1959 |
| 337 | Creating the municipality of Esperanza in the province of Masbate | May 7, 1959 |
| 338 | Creating an anti-economic subversion force to be known as Constabulary-Revenue-Customs Service Group | May 26, 1959 |
| 339 | Providing for the implementing details for Reorganization Plan No. 19 A relative to management practices | June 1, 1959 |
| 340 | Authorizing the designation of training officers in the departments, bureaus, offices, and agencies of the National, provincial, and city governments, including Government-owned or controlled corporations, pending the creation of regular and permanent positions for such officers | June 2, 1959 |
| 341 | Prescribing rules and regulations for the appointment in the Regular Force, Philippine Air Force, of reserve officer pilots who are graduates of the Philippine Air Force or United States Air Force flying schools and non-pilot reserve officers on active duty who possess technical qualifications necessary for the operation and maintenance of aircraft | June 17, 1959 |
| 342 | Amending Executive Order No. 331, current series, creating the municipality of Maigo, province of Lanao, by changing the boundary line between the said municipality and the municipality of Bacolod | June 26, 1959 |
| 343 | Amending Executive Order No. 111, series of 1947, creating the municipality of Sta. Catalina, Negros Oriental, so as to fix the boundary line between the municipalities of Bayawan and Sta. Catalina | July 9, 1959 |
| 344 | Creating the municipality of Sibutad in the province of Zamboanga del Norte | July 9, 1959 |
| 345 | Extending the prohibition to slaughter carabaos up to December 31, 1959 | July 27, 1959 |
| 346 | Adjusting the classification of the municipality of Alitagtag, province of Batangas, and amending for this purpose, Executive Order No. 333, dated March 28, 1959 | July 29, 1959 |
| 347 | Creating the municipal district of San Fernando in the province of Bukidnon | July 29, 1959 |
| 348 | Amending further Executive Order No. 256, series of 1957, as amended by Executive Order No. 334, current series, by classifying the municipal district of Langangan in the province of Cagayan, and the municipal district of Tandubas in the province of Sulu | August 4, 1959 |
| 349 | Providing for a preliminary enumeration of dwellings in connection with the taking of the 1960 censuses of population and agriculture in the Philippines under Commonwealth Act 591 and Republic Act 2300 | August 10, 1959 |
| 350 | Creating the municipality of Palimbang in the province of Cotabato | August 14, 1959 |
| 351 | Creating the municipality of Mawab in the province of Davao | August 14, 1959 |
| 352 | Creating the municipality of Santo Tomas in the province of Davao | August 14, 1959 |
| 353 | Creating the municipal district of San Andres in the province of Quezon | August 20, 1959 |
| 354 | Waiving the additional progressive taxes to be collected from, and paid by, proprietors and operators of certain sugar mills for the crop year 1958–1959 | August 21, 1959 |
| 355 | Converting into municipalities all the municipal districts in the province of Sulu, except Marungas | August 26, 1959 |
| 356 | Creating the municipality of Kumalarang in the province of Zamboanga del Sur | August 28, 1959 |
| 357 | Creating the municipality of Sison in the province of Surigao | September 15, 1959 |
| 358 | Amending the Fourth Paragraph of Executive Order No. 298, dated August 12, 1940, entitled "Prescribing the automatic renewal of contracts, requiring public bidding before entering into new contracts, and providing exceptions therefor," as inserted by Executive Order No. 146, dated December 27, 1955, and amended by Executive Order No. 212, dated November 6, 1956, and Executive Order No. 318, dated September 17, 1958 | September 23, 1959 |
| 359 | Creating the municipality of San Isidro in the province of Surigao | October 9, 1959 |
| 360 | Creating the municipality of Valencia in the province of Bukidnon | October 11, 1959 |
| 361 | Promulgating rules and regulations for the implementation of the proposals of Filipinos residing in the United States to invest in the economic development program of the Philippines | October 12, 1959 |
| 362 | Creating the municipality of Buenavista in the province of Bohol | October 26, 1959 |
| 363 | Amending Executive Order No. 349, dated August 10, 1959, entitled "Providing for a preliminary enumeration of dwellings in connection with the taking of the 1960 censuses of population and agriculture in the Philippines under Commonwealth Act 591 and Republic Act 2300" | November 21, 1959 |
| 364 | Creating provincial, city, municipal, and municipal district census boards to act as consultative bodies and to assist the Bureau of the Census and Statistics during the preparation and actual enumeration work within their respective jurisdictions in the 1960 census | November 21, 1959 |
| 366 | Creating the municipality of Olongapo in the province of Zambales | December 7, 1959 |
| 367 | Creating the municipality of Cagdianao in the province of Surigao | December 23, 1959 |
| 368 | Reconstituting the barrios and sitios to compose the municipalities of Bontoc and Sogod, both of the province of Leyte, and readjusting the territories of said municipalities | December 28, 1959 |

== 1960 ==
| No. | Title | Date signed |
|---|---|---|
| 365 | Fixing Monday, February 1, 1960, as Census Day for Population and Housing, and Tuesday, May 3, 1960, as Census Day for Agriculture | January 6, 1960 |
| 369 | Amending Executive Order No. 361 dated October 12, 1959, entitled "Promulgating rules and regulations for the implementation of the proposals of Filipinos residing in the United States to invest in the economic development program of the Philippines" | January 6, 1960 |
| 370 | Creating the municipality of Salvador in the province of Lanao del Norte | January 13, 1960 |
| 371 | Creating the municipality of Linamon in the province of Lanao del Norte | January 13, 1960 |
| 372 | Fixing Monday, February 15, 1960, as Census Day for Population and Housing, and Tuesday, May 3, 1960, as Census Day for Agriculture | January 29, 1960 |
| 373 | Amending Executive Order No. 362 issued on October 26, 1959, creating the municipality of Buenavista in the province of Bohol | January 29, 1960 |
| 374 | Amending Paragraphs Nos. 4, 5, and 6 of Executive Order No. 287, dated February 6, 1958, entitled "Regulating the registration of, and assignment of number plates to, motor vehicles used by officials of the Republic of the Philippines and accredited representatives of foreign states" | February 5, 1960 |
| 375 | Transferring the seat of government of the municipality of Milagros, province of Masbate, from its present site at the poblacion to the sitio of Bonbon, same municipality | February 9, 1960 |
| 376 | Composition of the Armed Forces General Staff | February 10, 1960 |
| 377 | Amending Section 4 of Executive Order No. 389 dated December 23, 1950, entitled "Reorganizing the Armed Forces of the Philippines" | February 10, 1960 |
| 378 | Creating a Presidential Anti-Graft Committee to enforce and implement Republic Act No. 1379 | February 18, 1960 |
| 379 | Exhibiting the prohibition to slaughter carabaos up to December 31, 1960 | February 23, 1960 |
| 380 | Creating the municipality of Buug in the province of Zamboanga del Sur | February 26, 1960 |
| 381 | Creating the municipality of Albor in the province of Surigao | February 29, 1960 |
| 382 | Amending Executive Order No. 306, dated July 15, 1958, entitled "Creating the Presidential Committee on Administration Performance Efficiency under the Office of the President" | March 7, 1960 |
| 383 | Further amending Executive Order No. 72, dated December 3, 1936, establishing a classification of ports | March 11, 1960 |
| 384 | Amending Executive Order No. 398, dated January 5, 1951, by authorizing the Chairman of the Deportation Board to release or cancel bonds filed by alien respondents | March 11, 1960 |
| 385 | Creating a Productivity Commission and defining the powers and duties thereof | March 11, 1960 |
| 386 | Creating the municipality of Balabagan in the province of Lanao del Sur | March 15, 1960 |
| 387 | Revoking Executive Order No. 338, dated May 26, 1959, creating an anti-economic subversion force known as the Constabulary-Revenue-Customs Service Group | March 16, 1960 |
| 388 | Creating a National Surveying and Mapping Board | March 18, 1960 |
| 389 | Creating the municipal district of Magsaysay in the province of Lanao del Norte | March 22, 1960 |
| 390 | Fixing office hours during the hot season | March 26, 1960 |
| 391 | Opening the port of Mangagoy, Bislig, Surigao, as a subport of entry | April 5, 1960 |
| 392 | Providing instructions to be followed in the conduct of public affairs during the time that the president is outside the Philippines | April 30, 1960 |
| 393 | Creating the municipality of Mahayag in the province of Zamboanga del Sur | May 10, 1960 |
| 394 | Transferring the seat of government of the municipality of Burgos, province of Ilocos Sur, from its present site at the poblacion of barrio Bato to the barrio of Luna, same municipality | May 12, 1960 |
| 395 | Creating the municipalities of Tungawan and Titay in the province of Zamboanga del Sur | May 24, 1960 |
| 396 | Amending Executive Order No. 226, dated January 2, 1957, entitled "Creating a national campaign committee to raise funds to carry out objectives of Jose Rizal National Centennial Commission" | June 1, 1960 |
| 397 | Opening barrio Ayam in the municipality of Limay, province of Bataan, as subport of entry | June 7, 1960 |
| 398 | Suspending offices on June 27, 1960, due to Typhoon "Olive" | June 27, 1960 |
| 399 | Creating an executive committee for the development of the Quezon City National Park | July 14, 1960 |
| 400 | Creating the municipality of San Miguel in the province of Zamboanga del Sur | July 14, 1960 |
| 401 | Creating the municipality of Valenzuela in the province of Bulacan | July 21, 1960 |
| 402 | Creating the municipality of Mutia in the province of Zamboanga del Norte | July 22, 1960 |
| 403 | Declaring the municipal port of Larena, subprovince of Siquijor, Oriental Negros, as a national port open to coast-wise trade only | September 28, 1960 |
| 404 | Waiving the additional progressive taxes to be collected from, and paid by, proprietors and operators of certain sugar mills for the crop year 1959–1960 | September 28, 1960 |
| 405 | Converting the municipal district of Tamparan in the province of Lanao del Sur into a municipality | September 28, 1960 |
| 406 | Amending Executive Order No. 113, series of 1955, establishing the classification of roads | October 13, 1960 |
| 407 | Creating the municipality of Barobo in the province of Surigao del Sur | October 24, 1960 |
| 408 | Providing a more expeditious system and simpler forms for the encouragement and facilitation of foreign tourist travel to the Philippines | November 9, 1960 |
| 409 | Reclassifying municipal districts in the Philippines | December 5, 1960 |
| 410 | Creating the municipal district of Real in the province of Quezon | December 15, 1960 |

== 1961 ==
| No. | Title | Date signed |
|---|---|---|
| 411 | Converting the municipal district of Ganassi in the province of Lanao del Sur, into a municipality | January 18, 1961 |
| 412 | Exhibiting the prohibition to slaughter carabaos up to December 31, 1961 | January 27, 1961 |
| 413 | Requiring all branches and agencies of the Government to keep clean their premises and all properties under their control or supervision, in keeping with the objectives of Proclamation No. 715, dated October 27, 1960, declaring 1961 as Jose Rizal Year with slogan "Visit the Philippines–See the orient" | January 27, 1961 |
| 414 | Creating the municipality of Libungan in the province of Cotabato | January 27, 1961 |
| 415 | Creating the municipality of Tantangan in the province of Cotabato | January 27, 1961 |
| 416 | Providing instructions to be followed in the conduct of public affairs during the time that the president is outside the Philippines | February 7, 1961 |
| 417 | Amending Executive Order No. 113, series of 1955 | February 14, 1961 |
| 418 | Converting the municipal district of Wao in the province of Lanao del Sur into a municipality | February 22, 1961 |
| 419 | Creating the municipality of Socorro in the province of Surigao del Norte | February 22, 1961 |
| 420 | Transferring barrio Sta. Monica of the municipality of San Policarpo, Samar, and barrio Catumsan of the municipality of Lapinig, same province, to the municipalities of Oras and Arteche, respectively | March 6, 1961 |
| 421 | Creating the municipality of Belison in the province of Antique | March 10, 1961 |
| 422 | Creating the municipality of Danao in the province of Bohol | March 14, 1961 |
| 423 | Creating the municipality of San Miguel in the province of Bohol | March 14, 1961 |
| 424 | Extending the jurisdiction of the justice of the peace court of Olongapo, Zambales, over that portion of the U.S. Naval Base Reservation, Subic Bay Area, falling within the province of Zambales | March 14, 1961 |
| 425 | Creating the municipality of Lugait in the province of Misamis Oriental | March 16, 1961 |
| 426 | Fixing office hours during the hot season | March 18, 1961 |
| 427 | Creating the municipality of Alcantara in the province of Romblon | March 21, 1961 |
| 428 | Converting the municipal district of Lumba-Bayabao in the province of Lanao del Sur, into a municipality | June 1, 1961 |
| 429 | Creating a decoration to be known as the Rizal Pro Patria Award | June 2, 1961 |
| 430 | Creating the municipality of Gitagum in the province of Misamis Oriental | June 8, 1961 |
| 431 | Dividing the municipal district of Saguiaran in the province of Lanao del Sur into two municipal districts to be known as the municipal district of Saguiaran and the municipal district of Piagapo | June 9, 1961 |
| 432 | Opening Ozamiz City as a subport of entry of Cagayan de Oro City | June 9, 1961 |
| 433 | Further amending Executive Order No. 263, dated August 15, 1957, entitled "Creating the Pinaglabanan Commemorative Commission" | June 20, 1961 |
| 434 | Amending Executive Order No. 113, series of 1955, which establishes the classification of roads | June 26, 1961 |
| 435 | Opening the port of Tagbilaran, Bohol, a subport of entry within the collection district of the port of Cebu | July 6, 1961 |
| 436 | Creating the municipality of Lawigan in the province of Iloilo | July 10, 1961 |
| 437 | Authorizing payment of hazardous duty pay to officers of the Armed Forces of the Philippines | July 10, 1961 |
| 438 | Further amending Annex "A" to Executive Order No. 453, dated June 19, 1951, entitled "Establishing rules and regulations to control, curtail, regulate and/or prohibit the exportation or re-exportation of certain items from the Philippines, to implement Republic Act No. 613" | July 31, 1961 |
| 439 | Creating the municipality of Columbio in the province of Cotabato | August 6, 1961 |
| 440 | Creating the municipality of Bayugan in the province of Agusan | August 6, 1961 |
| 441 | Creating the municipality of Tulunan in the province of Cotabato | August 6, 1961 |
| 442 | Creating the municipality of Kitcharao in the province of Agusan | August 16, 1961 |
| 443 | Creating the municipality of Tabina in the province of Zamboanga del Sur | August 16, 1961 |
| 444 | Creating the municipality of Dangcagan in the province of Bukidnon | August 29, 1961 |
| 445 | Delegating to the Secretary of Agriculture and Natural Resources the power to sign patents and certificates covering lands not exceeding one hundred forty-four hectares in area concurrently with the Undersecretary for Natural Resources | August 30, 1961 |
| 446 | Creating the municipality of Basista in the province of Pangasinan | September 5, 1961 |
| 447 | Waiving the additional progressive taxes to be collected from, and paid by, proprietors and operators of certain sugar mills for the crop year 1960–1961 | September 5, 1961 |
| 448 | Amending Executive Order No. 113, series of 1955, which establishes the classification of roads | September 15, 1961 |
| 449 | Creating the President's Committee on Assistance to the Fishing Industry | October 14, 1961 |
| 450 | Abolishing the investigating committees on veterans' pension | November 5, 1961 |
| 451 | Directing municipal and city treasurers to issue certificates of indigency pursuant to Republic Act No. 747, as implemented by Executive Order No. 578, dated March 24, 1953 | November 20, 1961 |
| 452 | Creating the municipality of Bayabas in the province of Surigao del Sur | November 20, 1961 |
| 453 | Granting flying pay to officers of the Philippine Navy who are engaged in regular and frequent aerial flights and whose duties are inherent in the operation of the aircraft while in flight | December 4, 1961 |
| 454 | Creating the municipality of Sta. Teresita in the province of Batangas | December 28, 1961 |
| 455 | Readjusting the boundaries of the municipality of Buenavista in the province of Bohol, amending for this purpose Executive Order No. 373, dated January 29, 1960 | December 29, 1961 |
| 456 | Abolishing the Presidential Committee on Administration Performance Efficiency under the Office of the President created by Executive Order No. 306, dated July 15, 1958, as amended by Executive Order No. 382, dated March 7, 1960 | December 29, 1961 |
| 457 | Abolishing the Presidential Anti-Graft Committee to enforce and implement Republic Act No. 1379, created by Executive Order No. 378, dated February 18, 1960 | December 29, 1961 |
| 458 | Amending Executive Order No. 442, dated August 16, 1961, creating the municipality of Kitcharao in the province of Agusan | December 29, 1961 |
| 459 | Creating the municipality of Kalamansig in the province of Cotabato | December 29, 1961 |
| 460 | Creating the municipality of Pilar in the province of Bohol | December 29, 1961 |
| 461 | Creating the municipality of Matalam in the province of Cotabato | December 29, 1961 |
