= Lanao del Norte's 1st congressional district =

Legislative district of the Philippines

- Constituency for the House of Representatives of the Philippines
- Location of Lanao del Norte within the Philippines
- Province: Lanao del Norte
- Region: Northern Mindanao
- Population: 321,098 (2020}
- Electorate: 180,628 (2022)
- Major settlements: 11 LGUs: Municipalities; Bacolod; Balo-i; Baroy; Kauswagan; Kolambugan; Linamon; Maigo; Matungao; Pantar; Tagoloan; Tubod
- Area: 1,092.82 km^{2} (421.94 sq mi)

Current constituency
- Created: 1987
- Representative: Imelda Dimaporo
- Political party: PFP
- Congressional bloc: Majority

Lanao del Norte's 1st congressional district is a congressional district in the province of Lanao del Norte that has been used in the House of Representatives of the Philippines since 1987. The district's boundaries have been redrawn twice, originally consisting of seven municipalities and one city lining the coast of Iligan Bay in 1987, then losing the highly urbanized city of Iligan to its own separate district in October 2009, and finally with eleven municipalities including its capital, Tubod, since the second reapportionment in November 2009. The district is represented in the 20th Congress by Imelda Dimaporo of the Partido Federal ng Pilipinas (PFP).

== Representation history ==
#	Image	Member	Term of office		Congress	Party	Electoral history	Constituent LGUs
#	Image	Member	Start	End	Congress	Party	Electoral history	Constituent LGUs
=== Lanao del Norte's 1st district for the House of Representatives of the Philippines ===
District created February 2, 1987 from Lanao del Norte's at-large district.
1		Mariano Ll. Badelles Sr.	June 30, 1987	June 30, 1998	8th	Liberal	Elected in 1987.	1987–2010; Bacolod, Baroy, Iligan, Kauswagan, Kolambugan, Linamon, Maigo, Tubod
1		Mariano Ll. Badelles Sr.	June 30, 1987	June 30, 1998	9th	Lakas	Re-elected in 1992.	1987–2010; Bacolod, Baroy, Iligan, Kauswagan, Kolambugan, Linamon, Maigo, Tubod
1		Mariano Ll. Badelles Sr.	June 30, 1987	June 30, 1998	10th	NPC	Re-elected in 1995.	1987–2010; Bacolod, Baroy, Iligan, Kauswagan, Kolambugan, Linamon, Maigo, Tubod
2		Alipio Cirilo V. Badelles	June 30, 1998	June 30, 2007	11th	LAMMP	Elected in 1998.	1987–2010; Bacolod, Baroy, Iligan, Kauswagan, Kolambugan, Linamon, Maigo, Tubod
2		Alipio Cirilo V. Badelles	June 30, 1998	June 30, 2007	12th	NPC	Re-elected in 2001.	1987–2010; Bacolod, Baroy, Iligan, Kauswagan, Kolambugan, Linamon, Maigo, Tubod
2		Alipio Cirilo V. Badelles	June 30, 1998	June 30, 2007	13th	NPC	Re-elected in 2004.	1987–2010; Bacolod, Baroy, Iligan, Kauswagan, Kolambugan, Linamon, Maigo, Tubod
3		Vicente F. Belmonte Jr.	June 30, 2007	June 30, 2010	14th	Liberal	Elected in 2007. Redistricted to Iligan's at-large district.	1987–2010; Bacolod, Baroy, Iligan, Kauswagan, Kolambugan, Linamon, Maigo, Tubod
4		Imelda Dimaporo	June 30, 2010	June 30, 2016	15th	NPC	Elected in 2010.	2010–present Bacolod, Balo-i, Baroy, Kauswagan, Kolambugan, Linamon, Maigo, Matungao, Pantar, Tagoloan, Tubod
4		Imelda Dimaporo	June 30, 2010	June 30, 2016	16th	NPC	Re-elected in 2013.	2010–present Bacolod, Balo-i, Baroy, Kauswagan, Kolambugan, Linamon, Maigo, Matungao, Pantar, Tagoloan, Tubod
5		Mohamad Khalid Dimaporo	June 30, 2016	June 30, 2025	17th	Liberal	Elected in 2016.	2010–present Bacolod, Balo-i, Baroy, Kauswagan, Kolambugan, Linamon, Maigo, Matungao, Pantar, Tagoloan, Tubod
5		Mohamad Khalid Dimaporo	June 30, 2016	June 30, 2025	17th	PDP–Laban	Elected in 2016.	2010–present Bacolod, Balo-i, Baroy, Kauswagan, Kolambugan, Linamon, Maigo, Matungao, Pantar, Tagoloan, Tubod
5		Mohamad Khalid Dimaporo	June 30, 2016	June 30, 2025	18th	PDP–Laban	Re-elected in 2019.	2010–present Bacolod, Balo-i, Baroy, Kauswagan, Kolambugan, Linamon, Maigo, Matungao, Pantar, Tagoloan, Tubod
5		Mohamad Khalid Dimaporo	June 30, 2016	June 30, 2025	19th	Lakas	Re-elected in 2022.	2010–present Bacolod, Balo-i, Baroy, Kauswagan, Kolambugan, Linamon, Maigo, Matungao, Pantar, Tagoloan, Tubod
(4)		Imelda Dimaporo	June 30, 2025	Incumbent	20th	PFP	Elected in 2025.	2010–present Bacolod, Balo-i, Baroy, Kauswagan, Kolambugan, Linamon, Maigo, Matungao, Pantar, Tagoloan, Tubod

== Election results ==
=== 2025 ===
Candidate	Party	Votes	%
Imelda Dimaporo	Partido Federal ng Pilipinas	111,639	86.58
Joe Abbas	United Nationalist Alliance	17,311	13.42
Total		128,950	100.00
Valid votes		128,950	88.60
Invalid/blank votes		16,593	11.40
Total votes		145,543	100.00
Registered voters/turnout		177,487	82.00
Partido Federal ng Pilipinas hold			
Source: Commission on Elections

=== 2022 ===
Candidate	Party	Votes	%
Mohamad Khalid Dimaporo (incumbent)	PDP–Laban	108,498	87.87
Joe Abbas	Partido Federal ng Pilipinas	14,977	12.13
Total		123,475	100.00
Total votes		144,783	–
Registered voters/turnout		180,628	80.16
PDP–Laban hold			
Source: Commission on Elections

=== 2016 ===
2016 Philippine House of Representatives elections
Party	Candidate	Votes	%
Liberal	Mohamad Khalid Dimaporo	79,882	83.23%
UNA	Jo Sanguila	12,303	12.82%
Independent	Dunhill Palomares	3,781	3.93%
Total votes		95,966	100.00%

=== 2013 ===
2013 Philippine House of Representatives elections
Party	Candidate	Votes	%	±%
Liberal	Madrid Elias Ali			
NPC	Imelda Dimaporo			
Independent	Roberto Quico, Jr.			
Margin of victory				
Rejected ballots				
Turnout				
NPC hold		Swing		

=== 2010 ===
Candidate	Party	Votes	%
Imelda Dimaporo	Lakas–Kampi–CMD	70,631	68.74
Romulo Rizalda	Liberal Party	26,160	25.46
Rangiit Gedren Amesola	Independent	4,077	3.97
Tito Dichosa	Independent	1,879	1.83
Total		102,747	100.00
Valid votes		102,747	88.70
Invalid/blank votes		13,088	11.30
Total votes		115,835	100.00
Lakas–Kampi–CMD gain from Liberal Party			
Source: Commission on Elections

== See also ==
- Legislative districts of Lanao del Norte
