= Mindanao Civic Center =

Sports complex in Tubod, Lanao del Norte, Philippines

- The sports complex in the early 2020s.
- Interactive map of Mindanao Civic Center
- Location: Tubod, Lanao del Norte, Philippines
- Coordinates: 8°02′15.8″N 123°47′27.7″E
- Type: Sports complex

Construction
- Built: 1998–2001
- Opened: 2001
- Renovated: 2026
- Expanded: 2009
- Cost: ₱500 million (2001)
- Architect: Francisco Mañosa

The Mindanao Civic Center (MCC) is a sports complex in Tubod, Lanao del Norte. It was the main venue of the 2003 Palarong Pambansa.

== History ==
=== Construction ===
Lanao del Norte has been bidding for the right to host the Palarong Pambansa since 1996. The province was eventually selected to host the 1999 edition of the national youth games, prompting the construction of a sports complex in Tubod in 1998 that would later become known as the Mindanao Civic Center (MCC). By March 2000, the facilities were reported to be 80 percent complete. However, the province's hosting of the Palaro was repeatedly postponed or transferred to other localities due to financial and security concerns. By November 2001, the MCC was reported to be 95 percent complete at a cost of approximately ₱500 million.

The completed portions of the MCC sports complex were already being used for major sporting events. In November 2001, the Mindanao Civic Center served as the venue for the inaugural Mindanao Friendship Games, which brought together athletes from across Mindanao. At the time, the complex already included a stadium, an indoor arena, an Olympic-sized swimming pool, and tennis courts, as well as a 64-room hotel, a trade center, and a market. Lanao del Norte eventually hosted the Palarong Pambansa in October 2003, after the Games had been postponed three times that year, with the MCC serving as the main venue.

=== Late 2000s–2010s ===
The stadium in 2013.

The Mindanao Civic Center expanded with the completion of the race track designed for motocross in 2009.

On January 3, 2019, President Rodrigo Duterte signed Republic Act No. 11181, directing the Lanao del Norte government and the Philippine Sports Commission to develop the existing MCC as a sports training center.

=== 2020s ===
As a complex designed by National Artist Francisco Mañosa, the Mindanao Civic Center was declared an Important Cultural Property by the National Commission for Culture and the Arts in 2024.

Around 2025 to 2026, the MCC stadium underwent refurbishment, including the installation of a new track oval and an artificial football pitch. The track subsequently received World Athletics Class 2 certification, while the football pitch was certified by FIFA.

== Facilities ==
The Mindanao Civic Center covers an area of 71 hectares (180 acres) in Tubod, Lanao del Norte. The complex contains various sports facilities, a hotel, and other public infrastructure such as a marketplace and a trade center. Francisco Mañosa (d. 2019) designed the initial structures.

The MCC also has an athletes village which has dormitory buildings, and another separate building with VIP suites.

As of 2026, future planned venues include a baseball and softball diamond, a golf course, and another indoor arena. Earlier plans in 2001, already include a golf course, a shooting-archery range, and a sports academy.

Venue	Image	Purpose	Seating capacity	Notes	Ref.
MCC Stadium		Stadium	6,000	Has an athletics track and an artificial pitch.	
MCC Gymnasium		Indoor arena	4,368		
MCC Swimming Pool		Aquatics venue		Host as Olympic-size swimming pool and a warm-up pool	
MCC Race Track		Motocross track	—		
MCC Tennis Court		Tennis venue		Five tennis courts, inclusive of a championship court.	

== Competitions ==
- 2001 Mindanao Friendship Games
- 2003 Palarong Pambansa

Scheduled

- 2027 Mindanao Youth Games
