= Legislative districts of Iligan =

Legislative District of the Philippines

The legislative districts of Iligan are the representations of the highly urbanized city of Iligan in the Congress of the Philippines. The city is currently represented in the lower house of the Congress through its lone congressional district.

== History ==
Prior to gaining separate representation, areas now under the jurisdiction of Iligan were represented under the Department of Mindanao and Sulu (1917–1935), the historical Lanao Province (1935–1961), Region XII (1978–1984) and Lanao del Norte (1961–1972; 1987–2010).

By virtue of being classified as a highly urbanized city in 1983, Iligan was granted separate representation for the first time in the Regular Batasang Pambansa, electing one representative, at large, in 1984.

However, under the new Constitution which was proclaimed on February 11, 1987, the city was grouped again with Lanao del Norte and placed in its first congressional district; this district elected its first representative to the restored House of Representatives starting that same year.

Iligan regained separate representation with the passage of Republic Act No. 9724 on October 20, 2009, which segregated the city from the first district of Lanao del Norte to form its own congressional district starting in the 2010 elections.

== Lone District ==
- Population (2015): 342,618

Period	Representative
15th Congress; 2010–2013	Vicente F. Belmonte, Jr.
16th Congress; 2013–2016	Vicente F. Belmonte, Jr.
17th Congress; 2016–2019	Frederick W. Siao
18th Congress; 2019–2022	Frederick W. Siao
19th Congress; 2022–2025	Celso G. Regencia

== At-Large (defunct) ==
Period	Representative
Regular Batasang Pambansa; 1984–1986	Camilo P. Cabili

== See also ==
- Legislative district of Mindanao and Sulu
- Legislative district of Lanao
- Legislative districts of Lanao del Norte
