= Balo-i =

Municipality in Lanao del Norte, Philippines

Balo-i بالوئي
- Municipality
- Municipality of Balo-i
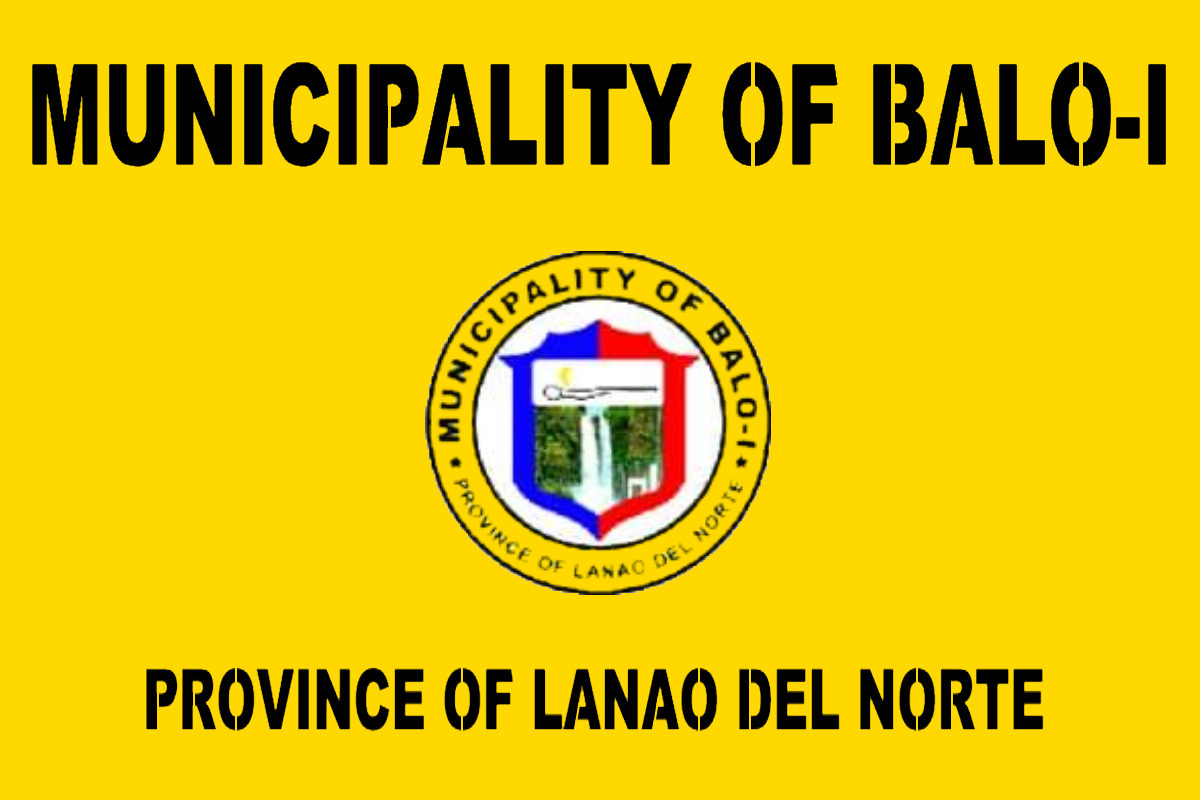
- Flag Seal

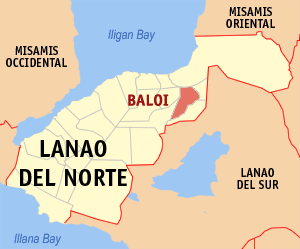
- Map of Lanao del Norte with Balo-i highlighted
- Interactive map of Balo-i
- Location within the Philippines
- Coordinates: 8°07′N 124°13′E
- Country: Philippines
- Region: Northern Mindanao
- Province: Lanao del Norte
- District: 1st district
- Founded: August 1, 1948
- Barangays: 21 (see Barangays)

Government
  - Type: Sangguniang Bayan
  - Mayor: Hanifa P. Ali
  - Vice Mayor: Mustapha M. Ali
  - Representative: Mohamad Khalid Q. Dimaporo
  - Municipal Council: Members: Cosain U. Campong Jr.; Moamar A. Rasol; Jamaludin M. Macaumbang; Yassin M. Patara; Jamaloding U. Mamad; Akima A. Lomondot; Mohsin I. Calandada; Abdullah M. Balas
  - Electorate: 21,449 voters (2025)

Area
  - Total: 90.98 km^{2} (35.13 sq mi)
- Elevation: 392 m (1,286 ft)
- Highest elevation: 616 m (2,021 ft)
- Lowest elevation: 139 m (456 ft)

Population (2024 census)
  - Total: 74,003
  - Density: 813.4/km^{2} (2,107/sq mi)
  - Households: 12,414

Economy
  - Income class: 1st municipal income class
  - Poverty incidence: 47.07% (2023)
  - Revenue: ₱ 242.6 million (2024)
  - Assets: ₱ 597.8 million (2024)
  - Expenditure: ₱ 207.1 million (2024)
  - Liabilities: ₱ 46.12 million (2024)

Service provider
  - Electricity: Lanao del Norte Electric Cooperative (LANECO)
- Time zone: UTC+8 (PST)
- ZIP code: 9217
- PSGC: 1003502000
- IDD : area code: +63 (0)63
- Native languages: Maranao; Cebuano; Binukid; Tagalog
- Major religions: Islam, Christianity
- Website: balo-i.gov.ph

Balo-i, officially the Municipality of Balo-i (Maranao: Inged a Balo-i; Cebuano: Lungsod sa Balo-i; Tagalog: Bayan ng Balo-i), is a municipality in the province of Lanao del Norte, Philippines. According to the 2024 census, it has a population of 74,003 people.

It is also spelled Baloi, or Balëy using Filipino 2014 Orthography.

Balo-i is the town where the Maria Cristina Airport, also known as Iligan Airport, is located.

== History ==
The town was created from the municipal districts of Momungan, Pantar, and Balut (August 1, 1948). It is the mother town of Tagoloan (June 21, 1969) and Pantar (June 11, 1978).

== Geography ==
=== Barangays ===
Balo-i is politically subdivided into 21 barangays. Each barangay consists of puroks while some have sitios.

- Abaga
- Adapun-Ali (Dariat)
- Angandog (Bulao)
- Angayen (Balut)
- Bangko
- Batolacongan (Basagad)
- Buenavista
- Cadayonan
- Landa (Gadongan)
- Lumbac
- Mamaanun
- Maria Cristina (Pendulunan)
- Matampay
- Nangka
- Pacalundo
- Poblacion East
- Poblacion West

=== Climate ===
Climate data for Balo-i, Lanao del Norte
Month	Jan	Feb	Mar	Apr	May	Jun	Jul	Aug	Sep	Oct	Nov	Dec	Year
Mean daily maximum °C (°F)	26 (79)	27 (81)	27 (81)	28 (82)	28 (82)	27 (81)	27 (81)	27 (81)	28 (82)	27 (81)	27 (81)	27 (81)	27 (81)
Mean daily minimum °C (°F)	22 (72)	22 (72)	22 (72)	23 (73)	23 (73)	23 (73)	23 (73)	22 (72)	23 (73)	23 (73)	23 (73)	22 (72)	23 (73)
Average precipitation mm (inches)	159 (6.3)	143 (5.6)	166 (6.5)	183 (7.2)	357 (14.1)	414 (16.3)	333 (13.1)	309 (12.2)	289 (11.4)	285 (11.2)	253 (10.0)	166 (6.5)	3,057 (120.4)
Average rainy days	18.4	17.2	20.6	23.4	29.3	29.2	29.9	29.4	27.7	28.7	25.5	19.9	299.2
Source: Meteoblue

== Demographics ==
Population census of Balo-i
Year	Pop.	±% p.a.
1948	14,498	—
1960	18,077	+1.86%
1970	23,644	+2.72%
1975	20,392	−2.92%
1980	19,383	−1.01%
1990	27,512	+3.56%
1995	32,063	+2.91%
2000	38,534	+4.02%
2007	44,366	+1.96%
2010	50,387	+4.74%
2015	58,383	+2.84%
2020	68,465	+3.41%
2024	74,003	+1.88%
Source: Philippine Statistics Authority

== Economy ==
Poverty incidence of Balo-i

Source: Philippine Statistics Authority

Crops

- vegetables
- camote (the largest camote in the province)
- corn
- pakal
- squash
- watermelon
- madang
- durian
- coconut
- peanut
- sweet potato
- nangka (jack fruit)

Delicacies

- rotie (a pancake that is made by a flour mixed with chicken curry flavor)
- dodol (a rice grind cooked with durian flavor)
- bakas (Smoke tuna)
- sweet delicacies such as tiyateg, berowa, amik, and tamokonsi.

== Infrastructure ==
It is the home of the Agus IV Hydroelectric Powerplant (Located in Barangay Nangka; 18 kilometers from Iligan City) on the Agus River. The plant, located 120 metres (390 ft) below ground surface, is the first underground hydroelectric plant in Mindanao and the third in the Philippines. It is said to be sufficient to light a city more than 12 times the size of Iligan City or to run 20 cement factories.

== Education ==
=== Colleges and universities ===
- Philippine Science High School Northern Mindanao Campus in Lanao del Norte
- MSU Balo-i Community College - formerly MSU Balo-i Pilot High School, now a college institution that offers three Bachelor of Science degrees (Agricultural Technology, Forestry Technology, and Information Technology).
- WestEastern Philippine College, Inc., - located in Zapacan, offers Kinder to Grade 6 and Junior High School, as well as Senior High School.
- Ibn Mas-oud Integrated School - located in Barangay East Poblacion, offers integrated elementary education with Arabic education.
- Momungan Academy - located in Barangay Pacalundo.

=== Public schools ===
Balo-i West District:

- Balo-i Central Elementary School
- Momungan Elementary School
- Pacalundo Elementary School
- Dadoan elementary School
- Bangko Elementary School
- Balut Primary School
- Matampay Primary School

Balo-i East District:

- Maria Cristina Central School
- Nangka elementary School
- Datu Timbul Ali Elementary School
- Sigayan Primary School
- Abaga Elementary School
- Pendulunan Elementary School
- Balo-i National High School
