= Tubod, Lanao del Norte =

Capital of Lanao del Norte, Philippines

Tubod
- Municipality
- Municipality of Tubod
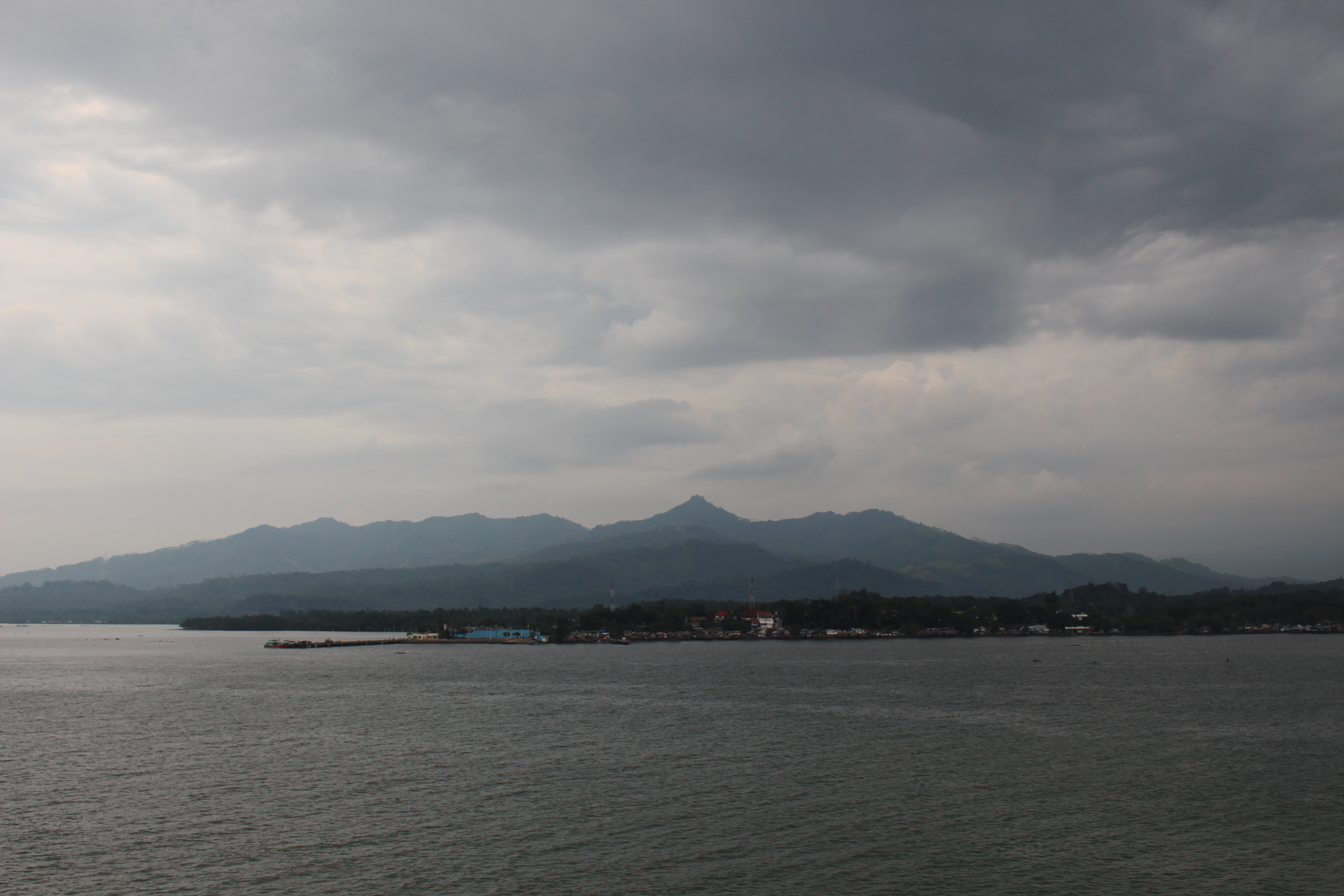
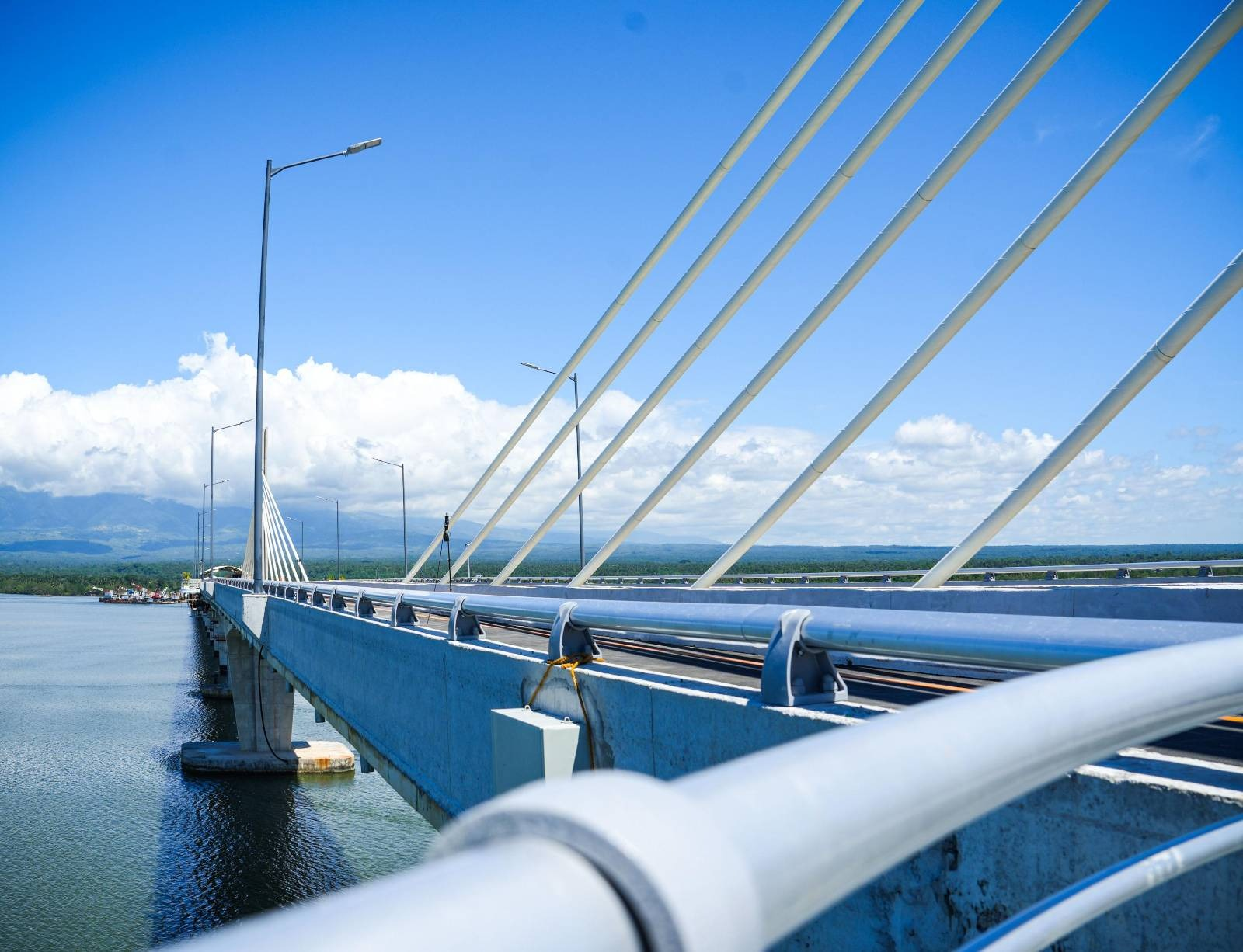
- Port of Tubod and Poblacion Lanao del Norte Provincial Capitol Panguil Bay Bridge

- Seal

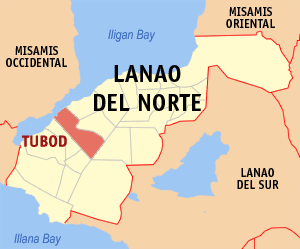
- Map of Lanao del Norte with Tubod highlighted
- Interactive map of Tubod
- Location within the Philippines
- Coordinates: 8°03′N 123°48′E
- Country: Philippines
- Region: Northern Mindanao
- Province: Lanao del Norte
- District: 1st district
- Founded: October 17, 1946
- Barangays: 24 (see Barangays)

Government
  - Type: Sangguniang Bayan
  - Mayor: Dionisio "Jimmy" Y. Cabahug Jr.
  - Vice Mayor: Clifford J. Jumalon
  - Representative: Imelda "Angging" Quibranza Dimaporo
  - Municipal Council: Members: Nelly Pepito; Lemuel Tadura; Eduardo Mansueto; Koko Yanoc; Noreen Sanchez; Nikko Cabahug; Gerald Dimpas; Jenny Vi Malazarte
  - Electorate: 31,369 voters (2025)

Area
  - Total: 246.80 km^{2} (95.29 sq mi)
- Elevation: 25 m (82 ft)
- Highest elevation: 335 m (1,099 ft)
- Lowest elevation: 0 m (0 ft)

Population (2024 census)
  - Total: 50,395
  - Density: 204.19/km^{2} (528.86/sq mi)
  - Households: 12,637

Economy
  - Income class: 1st municipal income class
  - Poverty incidence: 28.03% (2023)
  - Revenue: ₱ 277.4 million (2024)
  - Assets: ₱ 749.7 million (2024)
  - Expenditure: ₱ 280.7 million (2024)
  - Liabilities: ₱ 178 million (2024)

Service provider
  - Electricity: Lanao del Norte Electric Cooperative (LANECO)
  - Water: Tubod-Baroy Water District (TBWD)
- Time zone: UTC+8 (PST)
- ZIP code: 9209
- PSGC: 1003522000
- IDD : area code: +63 (0)63
- Native languages: Maranao; Cebuano; Binukid; Tagalog
- Website: www.tubodldn.gov.ph

Tubod, officially the Municipality of Tubod (Cebuano: Lungsod sa Tubod; Maranao: Inged a Tubod; Filipino: Bayan ng Tubod), is a municipality and capital of the province of Lanao del Norte, Philippines. According to the 2024 census, it has a population of 50,395 people.

Tubod is also where the Panguil Bay Bridge is situated. The 3.77 km (2.34 mi) bridge connects the municipality to Tangub City, Misamis Occidental.

== Etymology ==
Tubod derived its name from the spring located at Sitio Baybay in Barangay Poblacion. According to the old folks, even during the longest dry season, the spring will not drain. Tubod comes from the Cebuano language, meaning “the water source”. History pointed out that Christian immigrants from Luzon and Visayas settled in this part of the region.

== History ==
History pointed out that migrant from the Christian provinces in Visayas and Luzon settled in this part of the region. Latest survey shows that the Christian-Muslim in the municipality is about 97.3.

Republic Act No. 58 separated the Barrios of Tubod, Baroy, Lala, Daromawang, Bolod, Taguiquiron, Sagadan and Princesa from its mother municipality of Kolambugan to become a municipality "Tubod" effective October 17, 1946. On February 3, 1982, Parliamentary Bill No. 568 was enacted by the Batasang Pambansa in session assembled, transferring the site of Provincial Government of Lanao del Norte from Iligan City to Municipality of Tubod, making it the "Capital town" of the Lanao del Norte.

Rufo dela Cruz was sworn into office as the appointed Municipal Mayor on March 14, 1947. In the local election of 1947, Fausto Alvia as elected as Municipal Mayor.

On March 22, 1949, President Elpidio Quirino issued Executive Order No. 208, creating the municipality of Lala from the barrios of Rawaan, Gumagamut, Lala (poblacion), Simpak, Daromawang, Abagan, and Lanipao.

On June 10, 1949, the President Quirino issued Executive Order No. 222 creating the Municipality of Baroy whereby all the elected Municipal Officials except the councilor Arsenio A. Quibranza, opted to serve Baroy thus leading to the appointment of the Municipal Officials of Tubod with the Arsenio A. Quibranza as Municipal Mayor effective June 24, 1949.

In 1951 local elections the latter was elected as the Municipal Mayor and was re-elected twice during the 1955 and 1959 local elections, his term ended on March 8, 1962, when he was appointed by President Diosdado Macapagal as Vice Governor of Lanao del Norte. By the law of succession, the Vice Mayor Trifon A. Tabuco became the Municipal Mayor of Tubod and held the position until December 31, 1963. In the 1963 election, Jesus Perez was elected Municipal Mayor and was re-elected also in the 1967 election whose term ended on December 31, 1971. In 1971 election, the Marcelino Pepito was elected Municipal Mayor whose term ended on January 31, 1979, when Romana dela Cruz Neri too her oath and assumed office as appointed Municipal Mayor. In 1980 election, the latter was elected as the Municipal Mayor whose term ended as an aftermath of the February 25, 1986, EDSA Revolution. The Municipal government of Tubod was governed since by OICs Panfilo dela Cruz, Rooseque B. Calacat and Panfilo Labunog, respectively, until January 31, 1988. In the February 2, 1988, election, the Romana dela Cruz Neri was elected again as the Municipal Mayor of Tubod. She held the same office until she was defeated by Constancio A. Pepito in 1992 synchronized national and local elections, who held the position for three consecutive terms. In 2001 elections, Eduardo C. Mansueto was elected as Municipal Mayor and held the position for three consecutive terms. During the national and local election in 2010, the Nelieta Quibranza-Noval, who boarded the wagon of politics just like her father the late Arsenio A. Quibranza, was elected as Municipal Mayor and re-elected during the 2016 national and local election but she died on September 7, 2016.

== Geography ==
Tubod is located along the southeastern shores of Panguil Bay and is about 60 kilometres (37 mi) southwest of Iligan City, 10 kilometres (6.2 mi) south of Ozamiz City and about 2 kilometres (1.2 mi) west of Tangub City. The Panguil Bay Bridge links the municipality to the city of Tangub.

It is bounded by Panguil Bay and the municipality of Kolambugan on the north, Magsaysay on the northeast, Munai on the east, the municipalities of Salvador and Nunungan on the south, and the municipality of Baroy on the southwest. It has a regular terrain with low planes in the interior and undulating hills to rugged mountains along the northern portion, down to the southeastern portion of the municipality.

Tubod has 24 barangays and occupies a land area of 24,000 hectares (59,000 acres). Rainfall is present every month although it is outside the typhoon belt. It has an annual mean temperature of 26.6 °C (79.9 °F) and a mean monthly rainfall distribution of less than 74 millimetres (2.9 in). Of the total area of the municipality, 289.05 hectares are public land, including alienable, disposable, and forest land, 310 hectares rice land, 73.24 hectares as fishpond and swamp lands, and 117.44 hectares as residential land.

=== Barangays ===
Tubod is politically subdivided into 24 barangays. Each barangay consists of puroks while some have sitios.

- Barakanas
- Baris (Lumangculob)
- Bualan
- Bulod
- Camp 5
- Candis
- Caniogan
- Dalama
- Kakai Renabor
- Kalilangan
- Licapao
- Malingao
- Palao
- Patudan
- Pigcarangan
- Pinpin (Tadura)
- Poblacion
- Pualas
- San Antonio
- Santo Niño
- Taden
- Tangueguiron
- Taguranao
- Tubaran

=== Climate ===
Climate data for Tubod, Lanao del Norte
Month	Jan	Feb	Mar	Apr	May	Jun	Jul	Aug	Sep	Oct	Nov	Dec	Year
Mean daily maximum °C (°F)	29 (84)	30 (86)	31 (88)	31 (88)	30 (86)	30 (86)	29 (84)	30 (86)	30 (86)	30 (86)	30 (86)	30 (86)	30 (86)
Mean daily minimum °C (°F)	22 (72)	22 (72)	22 (72)	23 (73)	24 (75)	24 (75)	24 (75)	24 (75)	24 (75)	24 (75)	23 (73)	23 (73)	23 (74)
Average precipitation mm (inches)	69 (2.7)	58 (2.3)	67 (2.6)	60 (2.4)	109 (4.3)	114 (4.5)	83 (3.3)	78 (3.1)	76 (3.0)	92 (3.6)	86 (3.4)	63 (2.5)	955 (37.7)
Average rainy days	12.8	11.6	14.8	17.4	24.8	23.5	20.7	18.5	17.4	22.5	21.6	15.6	221.2
Source: Meteoblue

== Demographics ==
Population census of Tubod
Year	Pop.	±% p.a.
1948	32,171	—
1960	18,511	−4.50%
1970	23,138	+2.25%
1975	20,129	−2.76%
1980	24,740	+4.21%
1990	36,083	+3.85%
1995	41,295	+2.56%
2000	43,067	+0.90%
2007	44,095	+0.33%
2010	46,332	+1.82%
2015	47,165	+0.34%
2020	50,073	+1.27%
2024	50,395	+0.15%
Source: Philippine Statistics Authority

== Economy ==
Poverty incidence of Tubod (%)

Source: Philippine Statistics Authority

== Sports ==
Mindanao Civic Center

Tubod is the site of the Mindanao Civic Center (MCC), which houses a 6,000-seater stadium, a 4,368 seater indoor arena, a swimming pool and other facilities.

Additionally, MCC is the site of several motocross events in the country, giving the distinction of Tubod and the entire province as the "Motocross Capital of the Philippines".

== Culture ==
=== Festival ===
Tubod is primarily an agricultural town. Of its land area of 24,000, 80.7% is dedicated to agricultural use with a large percentage planted with bananas. Therefore, the ups and downs of the economic situation of the people in the interior barangay is more or less dependent on the banana industry. Cognizant with the bright prospect of banana products playing a vital role of livelihood of the people, in 1986, the LGU of Tubod, Lanao del Norte initiated the conceptualization of a festival that would give an all out emphasis on Council was organized to assist the LGU of Tubod in designing what is now known as the Sagingan Festival, as well as to determined priority measures to enhance the product of the economic symbol of Tubod. With close coordination of the Department of Agriculture, the banana yields of Tubod were given special treatment ( ex. Research, variety classification, soil analysis etc.). In 1987, the first Sagingan Festival celebrated by Tubod during the commemoration of the Towns creation (Charter day October 17). The celebration highlighted the presentation of the different varieties of bananas In Tubod (52 varieties as of last count). Seeing the festival enlightens the Tubodnons on the importance of Bananas in generation income, it was enhanced, developed, and sustained by the LGU of Tubod. Indeed, from the time, a portion of the LGU's 20% development fund was allocated for the Sagingan Festival. In 1992, Sagingan Festival was officially accredited with the Department of Tourism and included in the calendar festival in the entire Philippines. There festivals are highlighted with Street dancing Competition, Best Decorated Caromata, Booth Contest, Search for Ms. Sagingan Festival which use of 75% of Banana materials, banana Festival, and Agro-industrial Trade Fair. Folk Dance Competition and Sports Competition were incorporated to add and grandeur to the celebration. Romana dela Cruz-Neri is known as the Grandmother of the Sagingan Festival.

== Healthcare ==
- Tubod Community Hospital - Brgy. San Antonio
- Rural Health Unit - Poblacion
- Dr. Jaimi L. Intong Medical Clinic and laboratory
- LabwoRx Medical and Diagnostic Clinic

== Education ==
Elementary:

- All 24 barangays

Secondary:

- Mercy Junior College (Private)
- A.A.Q.N.H.S (Bualan)
- T.A.Q.N.H.S (Pualas)
- L.N.P.S.H.S (Malingao)
- Rufo Dela Cruz Integrated School
- Pigcarangan Integrated School
- Dalama Integrated School

Vocational:

- TESDA-LNNAIS
  - Main Campus (Bualan)
  - Satellite Campus (Tubod)

Tertiary:

- Tubod College - the first tertiary school in town and the first LGU funded in the Province.
- Mindanao Cooperative Institute of Technology. (Defunct)

== Media ==
- 93.5 MHz Radyo Arangkada
- 94.3 MHz DXNE Radyo Kalambuan
- 97.1 MHz Spring FM
