= Maigo =

Municipality in Lanao del Norte, Philippines

- Municipality
- Municipality of Maigo
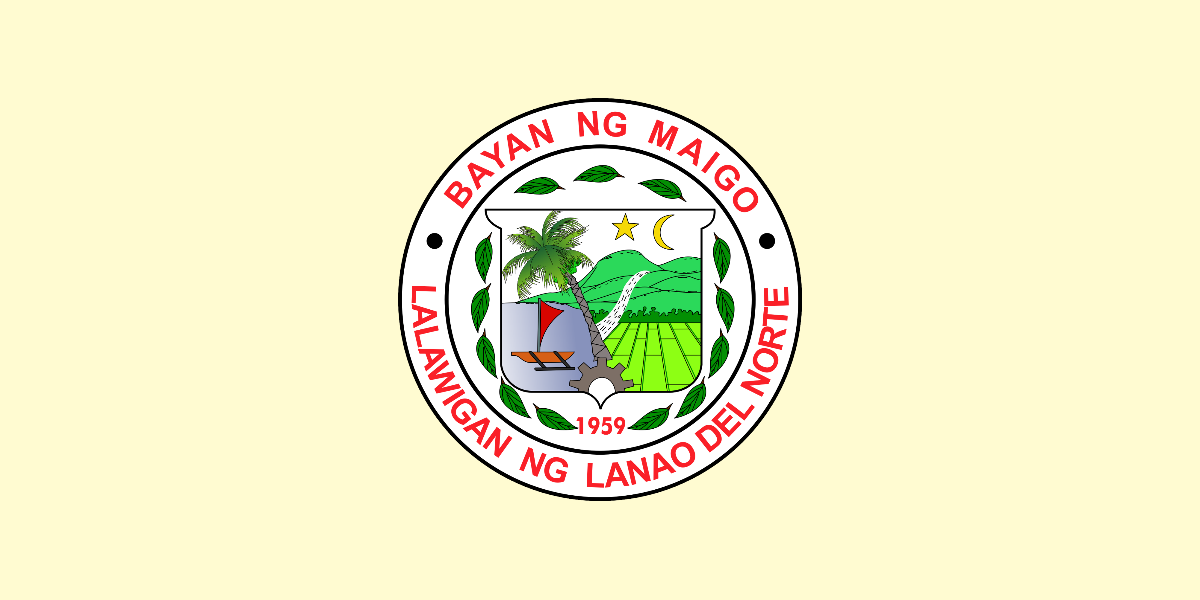
- Flag Seal

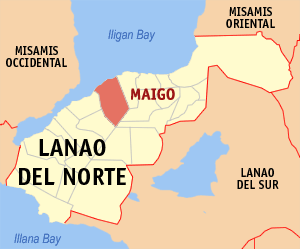
- Map of Lanao del Norte with Maigo highlighted
- Interactive map of Maigo
- Location within the Philippines
- Coordinates: 8°09′35″N 123°57′33″E
- Country: Philippines
- Region: Northern Mindanao
- Province: Lanao del Norte
- District: 1st district
- Founded: February 27, 1959
- Barangays: 13 (see Barangays)

Government
  - Type: Sangguniang Bayan
  - Mayor: Rafael "Paeng" Rizalda
  - Vice Mayor: Lanto Mutia
  - Representative: Mohamad Khalid Q. Dimaporo
  - Municipal Council: Members: Elbert "El-El" Mejorada; Joseph "Joy" Neri; Susan B. Frago; Kongkong "Cruz" Deromol; Noel "Petloy" Labastilla; Romulo "Mulong" Santos; Mama Orong; Arnel "Cocoy" Villalon
  - Electorate: 15,229 voters (2025)

Area
  - Total: 121.45 km^{2} (46.89 sq mi)
- Elevation: 44 m (144 ft)
- Highest elevation: 291 m (955 ft)
- Lowest elevation: 0 m (0 ft)

Population (2024 census)
  - Total: 23,400
  - Density: 193/km^{2} (499/sq mi)
  - Households: 5,482

Economy
  - Income class: 3rd municipal income class
  - Poverty incidence: 30.89% (2023)
  - Revenue: ₱ 145.5 million (2024)
  - Assets: ₱ 350.6 million (2024)
  - Expenditure: ₱ 143.2 million (2024)
  - Liabilities: ₱ 130.8 million (2024)

Service provider
  - Electricity: Lanao del Norte Electric Cooperative (LANECO)
- Time zone: UTC+8 (PST)
- ZIP code: 9206
- PSGC: 1003512000
- IDD : area code: +63 (0)63
- Native languages: Maranao; Cebuano; Binukid; Tagalog
- Website: www.maigo.gov.ph

Maigo, officially the Municipality of Maigo (Cebuano: Lungsod sa Maigo; Maranao: Inged a Maigo; Tagalog: Bayan ng Maigo), is a municipality in the province of Lanao del Norte, Philippines. According to the 2024 census, it has a population of 23,400 people.

== History ==
The town was originally part of Kolambugan before it was declared a municipality of its own; it was created a few years after the neighboring town of Bacolod was separated from Kolambugan. Executive Order No. 331 of 1959 created Maigo from the following:

- From Kolambugan: Maigo, Balagatasa, Segapod, and Mentring and their respective sitios.
- From Bacolod: Liagan Proper, Barogohan, Camps I, II, and III and their respective sitios.

A simple town where Muslims and Christians are living in harmony. But in recent years it had been the target of Moro Islamic Liberation Front which would later result to the fear of the people. Many locals have migrated to other places in Lanao del Norte and to Manila to avoid the fighting.

=== Settlement ===
The majority of people living in what is now Maigo were originally the Maranaos. According to folk story, during Spain occupation, some of the leaders from the interior areas of Lanao del Norte they would usually cross the beach of the municipality of Kolambugan to the beach of Ozamiz City by boat to catch people living in the other side and take them as workers (personal helper).

In long living and social process and sometimes in 1935 – 1944, under the National Land Settlement Administration (NLSA) of the Commonwealth Government, there was a Philippine House of Representative proposal to further populate the island of Mindanao and use some land to help the Philippine Government, and one of the opposition that time was Congressman Datu Salipada Khalid Pendatun. The proposal was approved and signed by President Manuel L. Quezon. The settlers were composed of different people from the Visayas and Luzon that had knowledge and experience regarding agriculture, technical, farming, lumber, carpentry, etc. The first batch landed in the following areas:

- Some parts of Zamboanga
- Misamis Occidental
- Lanao del Norte
- Misamis Oriental
- Some part of Surigao
- Some part of Davao
- Some Part of Cotabato

In Lanao del Norte, the transport of settlers was peacefully successful due to the smooth negotiations with the Maranao tribal leaders and land lords. As a sign of Welcome sign, the land lords donated a piece of land (a piece of land before was more than 5 hectares) to start the settlers' life. In the long run, the families of settlers were employed by land owners and as a gift, since they were very good workers, the land lord gave them a small piece of land as a gift. Some say that, settlers trade they made the business to the land lord just few item exchange of lands. Some family of land lords marry the daughter of their workers which result and until the majority living in Lanao del Norte and Misamis Occidental has blood in Maranao Tribe (Muslim Blood).

On the hand, the settlement has a going problem and conflict between Non-Muslim and Muslim when Martial Law was implemented.

== Geography ==
=== Barangays ===
Maigo is politically subdivided into 13 barangays. Each barangay consists of puroks while some have sitios.

- Balagatasa
- Camp
- Claro M. Recto
- Inoma
- Labuay
- Liangan West
- Mahayahay
- Maliwanag
- Mentring
- Poblacion
- Santa Cruz
- Segapod
- Kulasihan (Villanueva)

=== Climate ===
Climate data for Maigo, Lanao del Norte
Month	Jan	Feb	Mar	Apr	May	Jun	Jul	Aug	Sep	Oct	Nov	Dec	Year
Mean daily maximum °C (°F)	29 (84)	30 (86)	31 (88)	31 (88)	30 (86)	30 (86)	29 (84)	30 (86)	30 (86)	30 (86)	30 (86)	30 (86)	30 (86)
Mean daily minimum °C (°F)	22 (72)	22 (72)	22 (72)	23 (73)	24 (75)	24 (75)	24 (75)	24 (75)	24 (75)	24 (75)	23 (73)	23 (73)	23 (74)
Average precipitation mm (inches)	69 (2.7)	58 (2.3)	67 (2.6)	60 (2.4)	109 (4.3)	114 (4.5)	83 (3.3)	78 (3.1)	76 (3.0)	92 (3.6)	86 (3.4)	63 (2.5)	955 (37.7)
Average rainy days	12.8	11.6	14.8	17.4	24.8	23.5	20.7	18.5	17.4	22.5	21.6	15.6	221.2
Source: Meteoblue

== Demographics ==
Population census of Maigo
Year	Pop.	±% p.a.
1960	8,662	—
1970	10,578	+2.02%
1975	10,945	+0.69%
1980	12,556	+2.78%
1990	14,613	+1.53%
1995	16,822	+2.67%
2000	17,826	+1.25%
2007	18,706	+0.67%
2010	20,131	+2.71%
2015	21,666	+1.41%
2020	23,337	+1.58%
2024	23,400	+0.06%
Source: Philippine Statistics Authority

== Economy ==
Poverty incidence of Maigo (%)

Source: Philippine Statistics Authority

== Government ==
Mayors after People Power Revolution 1986:

- 1960–1980, Victorio Lumapas Dy
- 1980–1986, Luis P. Biliran Sr.
- 1986–1989, Loloy Libardos
- 1989–1992, Perlita P. Libardos
- 1992–1995, Perlita P. Libardos
- 1995–1998,
- 1998–2001,
- 2001–2004, Rafael C. Rizalda
- 2004–2007, Rafael C. Rizalda
- 2007–2010, Rafael C. Rizalda
- 2010–2013, Rafael C. Rizalda
- 2013–2016, Rafael C. Rizalda
- 2016–2019, Rafael C. Rizalda
- 2019–2022, Ina Louise R. Miflores
- 2022–2025, Rafael C. Rizalda
- 2025–Present, Rafael C. Rizalda
