= Tagoloan, Lanao del Norte =

Municipality in Lanao del Norte, Philippines

Tagoloan تاغولوان
- Municipality
- Municipality of Tagoloan
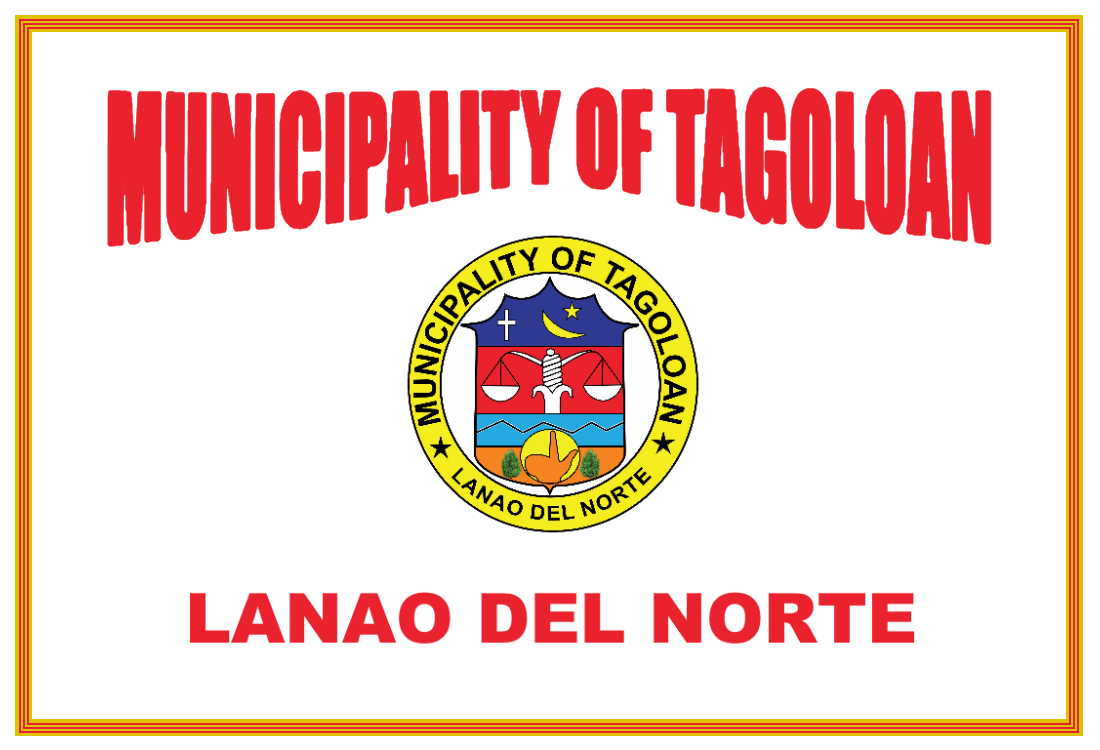
- Flag Seal

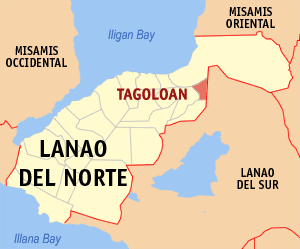
- Map of Lanao del Norte with Tagoloan highlighted
- Interactive map of Tagoloan
- Location within the Philippines
- Coordinates: 8°07′37″N 124°16′41″E
- Country: Philippines
- Region: Northern Mindanao
- Province: Lanao del Norte
- District: 1st district
- Founded: June 21, 1969
- Barangays: 7 (see Barangays)

Government
  - Type: Sangguniang Bayan
  - Mayor: Maminta S. Dimakuta
  - Vice Mayor: Sittie Ashia A. Palao
  - Representative: Mohamad Khalid Q. Dimaporo
  - Municipal Council: Members: Alicman P. Ali; Alinorodin D. Ali; Sobo P. Musor; Norhata P. Pascan; Edal M. Borcay; Taha T. Dagol; Jose L. Bonghanoy; Abdulwahab A. Ampog
  - Electorate: 8,846 voters (2025)

Area
  - Total: 69.70 km^{2} (26.91 sq mi)
- Elevation: 408 m (1,339 ft)
- Highest elevation: 974 m (3,196 ft)
- Lowest elevation: 39 m (128 ft)

Population (2024 census)
  - Total: 16,204
  - Density: 232.5/km^{2} (602.1/sq mi)
  - Households: 3,409

Economy
  - Income class: 4th municipal income class
  - Poverty incidence: 52.16% (2023)
  - Revenue: ₱ 102.4 million (2024)
  - Assets: ₱ 78.11 million (2024)
  - Expenditure: ₱ 115 million (2024)
  - Liabilities: ₱ 24.41 million (2024)

Service provider
  - Electricity: Lanao del Norte Electric Cooperative (LANECO)
- Time zone: UTC+8 (PST)
- ZIP code: 9222
- PSGC: 1003520000
- IDD : area code: +63 (0)63
- Native languages: Maranao; Cebuano; Binukid; Tagalog
- Major religions: Islam

Tagoloan, officially the Municipality of Tagoloan (Maranao: Inged a Tagoloan; Cebuano: Lungsod sa Tagoloan; Tagalog: Bayan ng Tagoloan), is a municipality in the province of Lanao del Norte, Philippines. According to the 2024 census, it has a population of 16,204 people,.

== History ==
Republic Act 5822, 21 June 1969: The barrios of Kiasar, Darimbang, Dimayon, Inagongan, Malibato, Dalamas, and Panalawan, all of the Municipality of Balo-i, Province of Lanao del Norte, are separated from said municipality and constituted into a distinct and independent municipality, to be known as the Municipality of Tagoloan, same province. The seat of government of the new municipality shall be in the poblacion of Barrio Darimbang.

== Geography ==
=== Barangays ===
Tagoloan is politically subdivided into 7 barangays. Each barangay consists of puroks while some have sitios.

- Dalamas
- Darimbang
- Dimayon
- Inagongan
- Kiazar (Poblacion)
- Malimbato
- Panalawan

=== Climate ===
Climate data for Tagoloan, Lanao del Norte
Month	Jan	Feb	Mar	Apr	May	Jun	Jul	Aug	Sep	Oct	Nov	Dec	Year
Mean daily maximum °C (°F)	28 (82)	29 (84)	30 (86)	31 (88)	30 (86)	30 (86)	30 (86)	30 (86)	30 (86)	30 (86)	29 (84)	29 (84)	30 (85)
Mean daily minimum °C (°F)	24 (75)	24 (75)	24 (75)	25 (77)	26 (79)	26 (79)	25 (77)	25 (77)	25 (77)	25 (77)	25 (77)	25 (77)	25 (77)
Average precipitation mm (inches)	271 (10.7)	217 (8.5)	193 (7.6)	178 (7.0)	344 (13.5)	423 (16.7)	362 (14.3)	358 (14.1)	329 (13.0)	320 (12.6)	322 (12.7)	260 (10.2)	3,577 (140.9)
Average rainy days	23.2	19.5	22.0	22.8	29.6	28.9	30.3	29.8	28.1	28.8	26.1	24.1	313.2
Source: Meteoblue

== Demographics ==
Population census of Tagoloan
Year	Pop.	±% p.a.
1970	5,900	—
1975	5,475	−1.49%
1980	6,058	+2.04%
1990	6,853	+1.24%
1995	8,027	+3.01%
2000	8,233	+0.54%
2007	9,274	+1.66%
2010	11,674	+8.74%
2015	13,253	+2.45%
2020	15,091	+2.77%
2024	16,204	+1.72%
Source: Philippine Statistics Authority

== Economy ==
Poverty incidence of Tagoloan (%)

Source: Philippine Statistics Authority

== Government ==
Mayors after People Power Revolution 1986:

- 1986–1992, Bedore Pascan
- 1992–1995, Monatao A Campong
- 1995–1998, Monatao A Campong
- 1998–2001, Adelaida C Dimakuta
- 2001–2004, Sobaida T Balindong
- 2004–2007, Engr. Maminta "Mighty" S. Dimakuta, Al-Hadj
- 2007–2010, Engr. Maminta "Mighty" S. Dimakuta, Al-Hadj
- 2010–2013, Engr. Maminta "Mighty" S. Dimakuta, Al-Hadj
- 2013–2016, Ibrahim D. Tuano, Al-Hadj
- 2016–present, Engr. Maminta "Mighty" S. Dimakuta, Al-Hadj

Vice Mayors after People Power Revolution 1986:

- 1986–1992,
- 1992–1995,
- 1995–1998,
- 1998–2001,
- 2001–2004,
- 2004–2007, Basmala "Bammy" B. Sarip
- 2007–2010, Basmala "Bammy" B. Sarip
- 2010–2013, Basmala "Bammy" B. Sarip
- 2013–2016, Engr. Maminta "Mighty" S. Dimakuta, Al-Hadj
- 2016–2019, Jiapar T. Macapaar
- 2019–present, Sittie Ashia "Nabila" A. Palao
