= Pantar, Lanao del Norte =

Municipality in Lanao del Norte, Philippines

Pantar فانتار
- Municipality
- Municipality of Pantar
- Seal

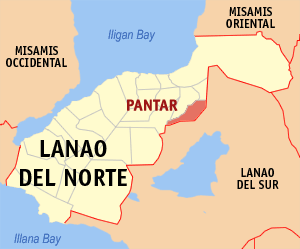
- Map of Lanao del Norte with Pantar highlighted
- Interactive map of Pantar
- Location within the Philippines
- Coordinates: 8°04′00″N 124°16′00″E
- Country: Philippines
- Region: Northern Mindanao
- Province: Lanao del Norte
- District: 1st district
- Founded: June 11, 1978
- Named for: Pantar, Indonesia
- Barangays: 21 (see Barangays)

Government
  - Type: Sangguniang Bayan
  - Mayor: Jabar D. Tago
  - Vice Mayor: Casim D. Abubacar
  - Representative: Mohamad Khalid Q. Dimaporo
  - Municipal Council: Members: Mohammad Amjad R. Rashin; Farouk B. Gubaten; Muslimen D. Macaombao; Arafat L. Daluma; Anuar D. Cadar; Nashrodin D. Adato; Junaid A. Mama; Junaid B. Ombawa
  - Electorate: 12,401 voters (2025)

Area
  - Total: 70.40 km^{2} (27.18 sq mi)
- Elevation: 598 m (1,962 ft)
- Highest elevation: 1,046 m (3,432 ft)
- Lowest elevation: 362 m (1,188 ft)

Population (2024 census)
  - Total: 27,300
  - Density: 388/km^{2} (1,000/sq mi)
  - Households: 4,708

Economy
  - Income class: 4th municipal income class
  - Poverty incidence: 50.6% (2023)
  - Revenue: ₱ 115.7 million (2024)
  - Assets: ₱ 125 million (2024)
  - Expenditure: ₱ 114 million (2024)
  - Liabilities: ₱ 27.09 million (2024)

Service provider
  - Electricity: Lanao del Sur Electric Cooperative (LASURECO)
- Time zone: UTC+8 (PST)
- ZIP code: 9218
- PSGC: 1003523000
- IDD : area code: +63 (0)63
- Native languages: Maranao; Cebuano; Binukid; Tagalog
- Religions: Islam (dominant); Roman Catholic
- Website: www.pantarldn.gov.ph

Pantar, officially the Municipality of Pantar (Maranao: Inged a Pantar; Cebuano: Lungsod sa Pantar; Tagalog: Bayan ng Pantar), is a municipality in the province of Lanao del Norte, Philippines. According to the 2024 census, it has a population of 27,300 people.

== History ==
The town was created and detached from the municipality of Balo-i on June 11, 1978, by virtue of Presidential Decree No. 1551. Its first appointed mayor and first elected mayor was Judge Cosain D. Campong, a primer and one of the well known Family in the Municipal is Madca Family at Kalanganan East with their most popular grandson Minsuari Tomondog Madca.

Presidential Decree No. 1551, 11 June 1978, Section 1:

Barangays Pantar Poblacion, Pantaon, Talontona, West Pantar, Pindoloan, Pantar East, Campong, Bobong, Raya, Kalanganan East, Kalanganan Lower, Tambo, Cadayonan, Tawaan, Domakias, Pitubo, Bobong-Madaya, Cabasaran, Bangcal, Pantao-Marug, Punod, Bowi, Poona-Punod, Pantao-Ranao, Sundiga-Punud, Bogowan-Ingud, Cawi-Ompara, River Side, Kalilangan and Dibarosan, all in the Municipality of Balo-i, Province of Lanao del Norte, are hereby detached and separated therefrom to form and constitute into a distinct and independent municipality which is created to be known as the Municipality of Pantar without affecting in any manner the legal existence of the mother municipality of Balo-i. The seat of government of the newly-created municipality shall be in Barangay Pantar Poblacion.

== Geography ==
=== Barangays ===
Pantar is politically subdivided into 21 barangays. Each barangay consists of puroks while some have sitios.

- Bangcal
- Bubong Madaya
- Bowi
- Cabasaran
- Cadayonan
- Campong
- Dibarosan
- Kalanganan East
- Kalanganan Lower
- Kalilangan
- Lumba-Punod
- Pantao-Marug
- Pantao-Ranao
- Pantar East
- Pitubo
- Poblacion
- Poona-Punod
- Punod
- Sundiga-Punod
- Tawanan
- West Pantar

=== Climate ===
Climate data for Pantar, Lanao del Norte
Month	Jan	Feb	Mar	Apr	May	Jun	Jul	Aug	Sep	Oct	Nov	Dec	Year
Mean daily maximum °C (°F)	29 (84)	25 (77)	26 (79)	27 (81)	26 (79)	26 (79)	26 (79)	26 (79)	26 (79)	26 (79)	26 (79)	25 (77)	26 (79)
Mean daily minimum °C (°F)	20 (68)	20 (68)	20 (68)	21 (70)	22 (72)	22 (72)	21 (70)	21 (70)	21 (70)	21 (70)	21 (70)	21 (70)	21 (70)
Average precipitation mm (inches)	159 (6.3)	143 (5.6)	166 (6.5)	183 (7.2)	357 (14.1)	414 (16.3)	333 (13.1)	309 (12.2)	289 (11.4)	285 (11.2)	253 (10.0)	166 (6.5)	3,057 (120.4)
Average rainy days	18.4	17.2	20.6	23.4	29.3	29.2	29.9	29.4	27.7	28.7	25.5	19.9	299.2
Source: Meteoblue

== Demographics ==
Population census of Pantar
Year	Pop.	±% p.a.
1980	7,184	—
1990	10,148	+3.52%
1995	11,704	+2.71%
2000	12,826	+1.98%
2007	15,720	+2.85%
2010	18,440	+5.98%
2015	21,773	+3.21%
2020	26,599	+4.30%
2024	27,300	+0.63%
Source: Philippine Statistics Authority

== Economy ==
Poverty incidence of Pantar (%)

Source: Philippine Statistics Authority
