= Bacolod, Lanao del Norte =

Municipality in Lanao del Norte, Philippines

Bacolod
- Municipality
- Municipality of Bacolod
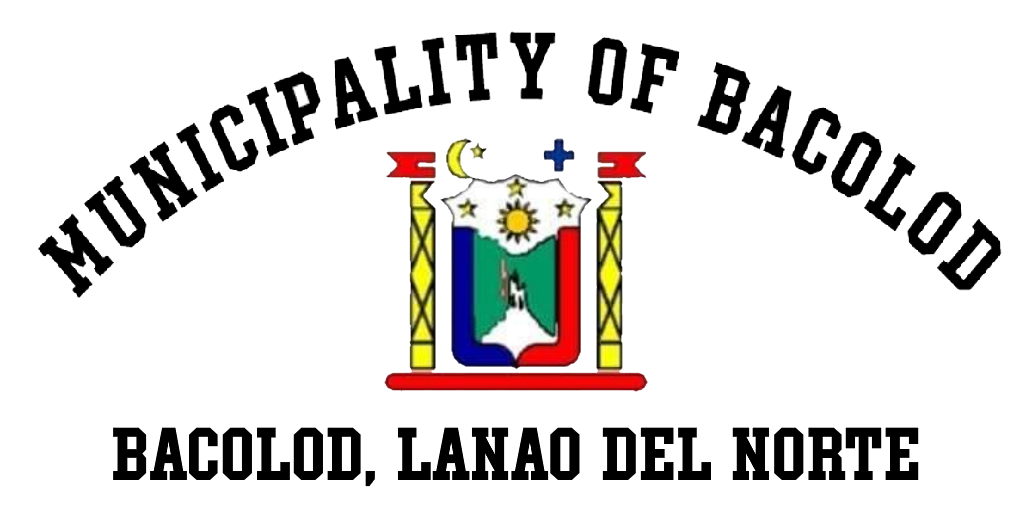
- Flag Seal

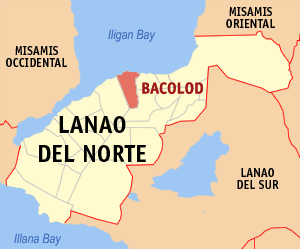
- Map of Lanao del Norte with Bacolod highlighted
- Interactive map of Bacolod
- Location within the Philippines
- Coordinates: 8°11′21″N 124°01′26″E
- Country: Philippines
- Region: Northern Mindanao
- Province: Lanao del Norte
- District: 1st district
- Founded: May 10, 1956
- Barangays: 16 (see Barangays)

Government
  - Type: Sangguniang Bayan
  - Mayor: Judith V. Miquiabas
  - Vice Mayor: Alfons Janssen P. Marcera
  - Representative: Mohamad Khalid Q. Dimaporo
  - Municipal Council: Members: Mark B. Patiño; Nilo M. Quijano; Hadji Ismael G. Ampaso; Roy Arvin T. Antonio; Quintin A. Clapano Jr.; Lorie Ann P. Tario; Owen S. Prones; David Alex F. Aranjuez Jr.
  - Electorate: 15,531 voters (2025)

Area
  - Total: 104.10 km^{2} (40.19 sq mi)
- Elevation: 45 m (148 ft)
- Highest elevation: 228 m (748 ft)
- Lowest elevation: 0 m (0 ft)

Population (2024 census)
  - Total: 24,963
  - Density: 239.80/km^{2} (621.07/sq mi)
  - Households: 6,110

Economy
  - Income class: 3rd municipal income class
  - Poverty incidence: 32.04% (2023)
  - Revenue: ₱ 145.4 million (2024)
  - Assets: ₱ 259.3 million (2024)
  - Expenditure: ₱ 129.4 million (2024)
  - Liabilities: ₱ 64.23 million (2024)

Service provider
  - Electricity: Lanao del Norte Electric Cooperative (LANECO)
- Time zone: UTC+8 (PST)
- ZIP code: 9205
- PSGC: 1003501000
- IDD : area code: +63 (0)63
- Native languages: Maranao; Cebuano; Binukid; Tagalog
- Website: www.bacolodldn.gov.ph

Bacolod, officially the Municipality of Bacolod (Maranao: Inged a Bacolod; Cebuano: Lungsod sa Bacolod; Tagalog: Bayan ng Bacolod), is a municipality in the province of Lanao del Norte, Philippines. According to the 2024 census, it has a population of 24,963 people. The town is home to the ruins of an old Spanish fort, known as Fort Almonte, which is in dire need of proper conservation and faithful restoration by the National Museum of the Philippines.

== Etymology ==
Bacolod in the Maranao language means "wide shore". When Maranaos and other people pass the area as they journey by sea, they will always see the shore along present-day Bacolod very wide during low tide, hence, they call the area "bacolod". It was once a mere barrio of the municipality of Kolambugan, the oldest town of the province of Lanao del Norte. This island is located at a point of an existing barangay called Binuni.

== History ==
Before the Spanish colonization of the Philippine archipelago began, the majority people living in Bacolod were the Maranaos. According to the story from the old leaders, during Spanish colonial period some of the leaders from the interior areas of Lanao del Norte usually cross the beach of municipality of Kolambugan to the coastline of what is now Ozamiz City by boat to kidnap people living in other side and make them as workers (personal helper), many of whom are Visayans.

During the American colonial period, under the National Land Settlement Administration (NLSA) of the Commonwealth Government, there was a Philippine House of Representative proposal to invade the Island of Mindanao to use the some land to help the Philippine Government, and one of the opposition that time is Congressman Datu Salipada Khalid Pendatun. The proposal was approved and signed by President Manuel L. Quezon. The settlers compose of people from Luzon and Visayas who have various knowledgeable skill jobs such as farming, engineering, logging, construction, etc.

- Some parts of Zamboanga
- Misamis Occidental
- Lanao del Norte
- Misamis Oriental
- Some part of Surigao
- Some part of Davao
- Some Part of Cotabato

In Lanao del Norte, the transport of settlers was paacefully successful due to the smooth negotiations with the Maranao tribal leaders and landlords. As a welcome sign, the landlords donated a five-hectare plot of land to the settlers to start a new life. The family of settler worked to the landowners in the process, and as a gift since they are very good workers, the land lord gave the small piece of land. It is said that settlers trade goods to the landlord in exchange of lands. Some of landlords' sons marry the daughter of their workers which result and until the majority living in Lanao del Norte and Misamis Occidental has blood in Maranao Tribe (Muslim Blood).

On the hand, the settlement has going problem and conflict between Non-Muslim and Muslim when Martial Law is implemented.

== Geography ==
=== Barangays ===
Bacolod is politically subdivided into 16 barangays. Each barangay consists of puroks while some have sitios.

- Alegria
- Babalaya
- Babalayan Townsite
- Binuni
- Delabayan West
- Demologan
- Demarao
- Esperanza
- Kahayag
- Liangan East
- Punod (Maliwanag)
- Mate
- Minaulon
- Pagayawan
- Poblacion
- Rupagan

=== Climate ===
Climate data for Bacolod, Lanao del Norte
Month	Jan	Feb	Mar	Apr	May	Jun	Jul	Aug	Sep	Oct	Nov	Dec	Year
Mean daily maximum °C (°F)	29 (84)	30 (86)	30 (86)	31 (88)	30 (86)	29 (84)	29 (84)	30 (86)	30 (86)	29 (84)	30 (86)	29 (84)	30 (85)
Mean daily minimum °C (°F)	22 (72)	22 (72)	22 (72)	23 (73)	24 (75)	24 (75)	24 (75)	23 (73)	24 (75)	24 (75)	23 (73)	23 (73)	23 (74)
Average precipitation mm (inches)	69 (2.7)	58 (2.3)	67 (2.6)	60 (2.4)	109 (4.3)	114 (4.5)	83 (3.3)	78 (3.1)	76 (3.0)	92 (3.6)	86 (3.4)	63 (2.5)	955 (37.7)
Average rainy days	12.8	11.6	14.8	17.4	24.8	23.5	20.7	18.5	17.4	22.5	21.6	15.6	221.2
Source: Meteoblue

== Demographics ==
Population census of Bacolod
Year	Pop.	±% p.a.
1960	9,874	—
1970	10,685	+0.79%
1975	12,232	+2.75%
1980	13,418	+1.87%
1990	14,637	+0.87%
1995	16,454	+2.22%
2000	17,020	+0.73%
2007	19,872	+2.16%
2010	21,818	+3.46%
2015	23,034	+1.04%
2020	24,367	+1.19%
2024	24,963	+0.58%
Source: Philippine Statistics Authority

== Economy ==
Poverty incidence of Bacolod

Source: Philippine Statistics Authority
