= Lanao del Norte =

- Province
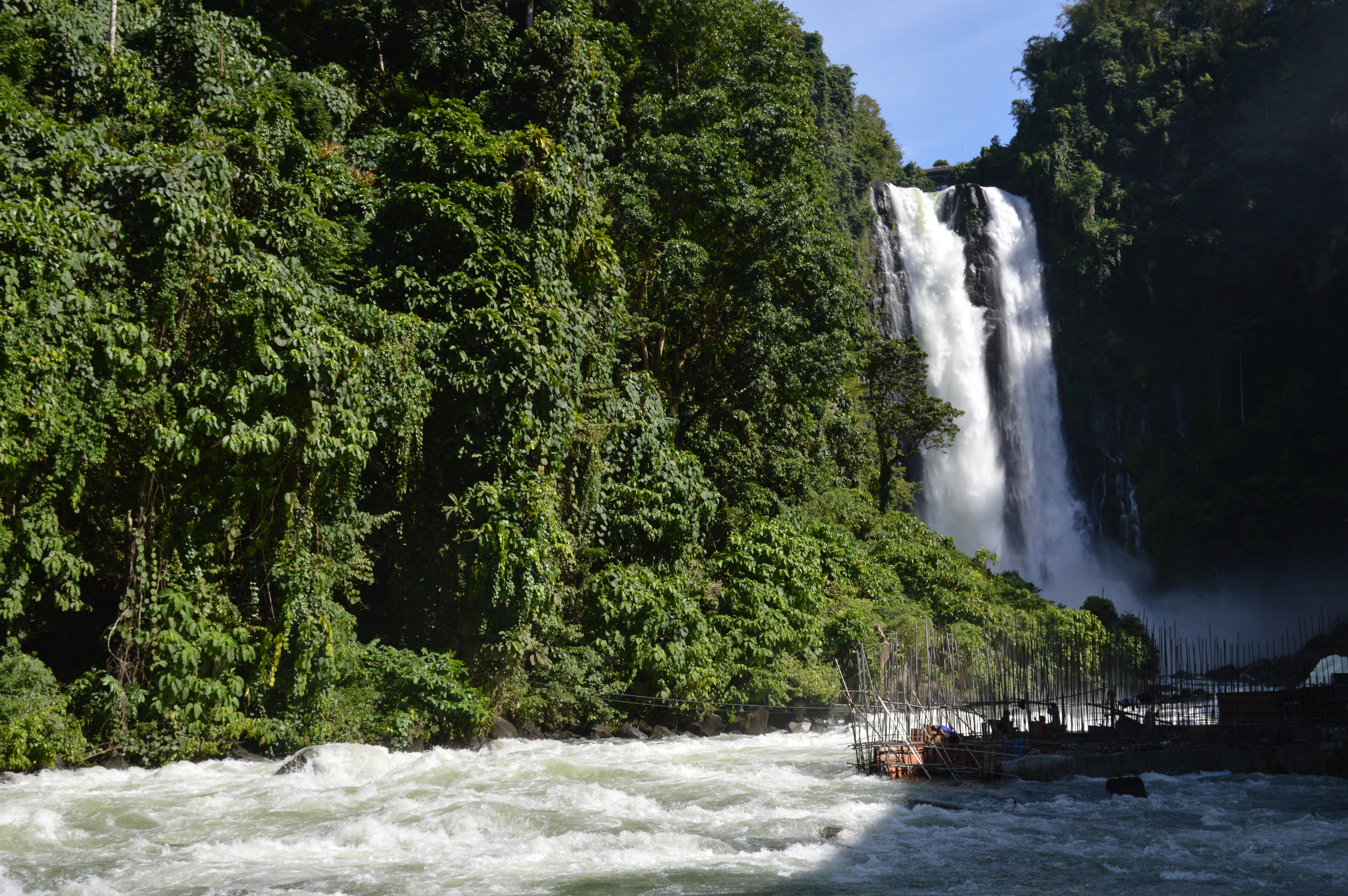
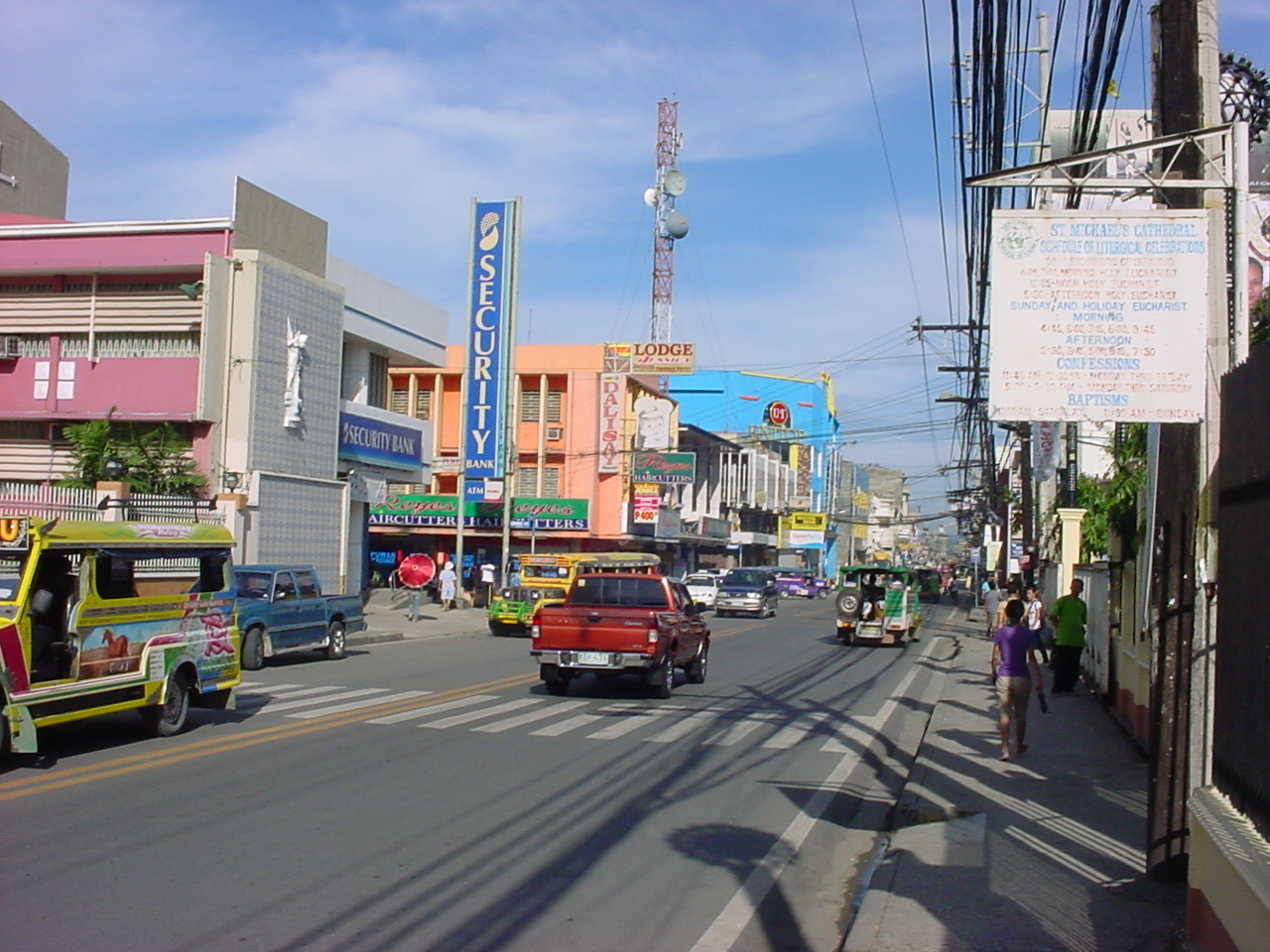
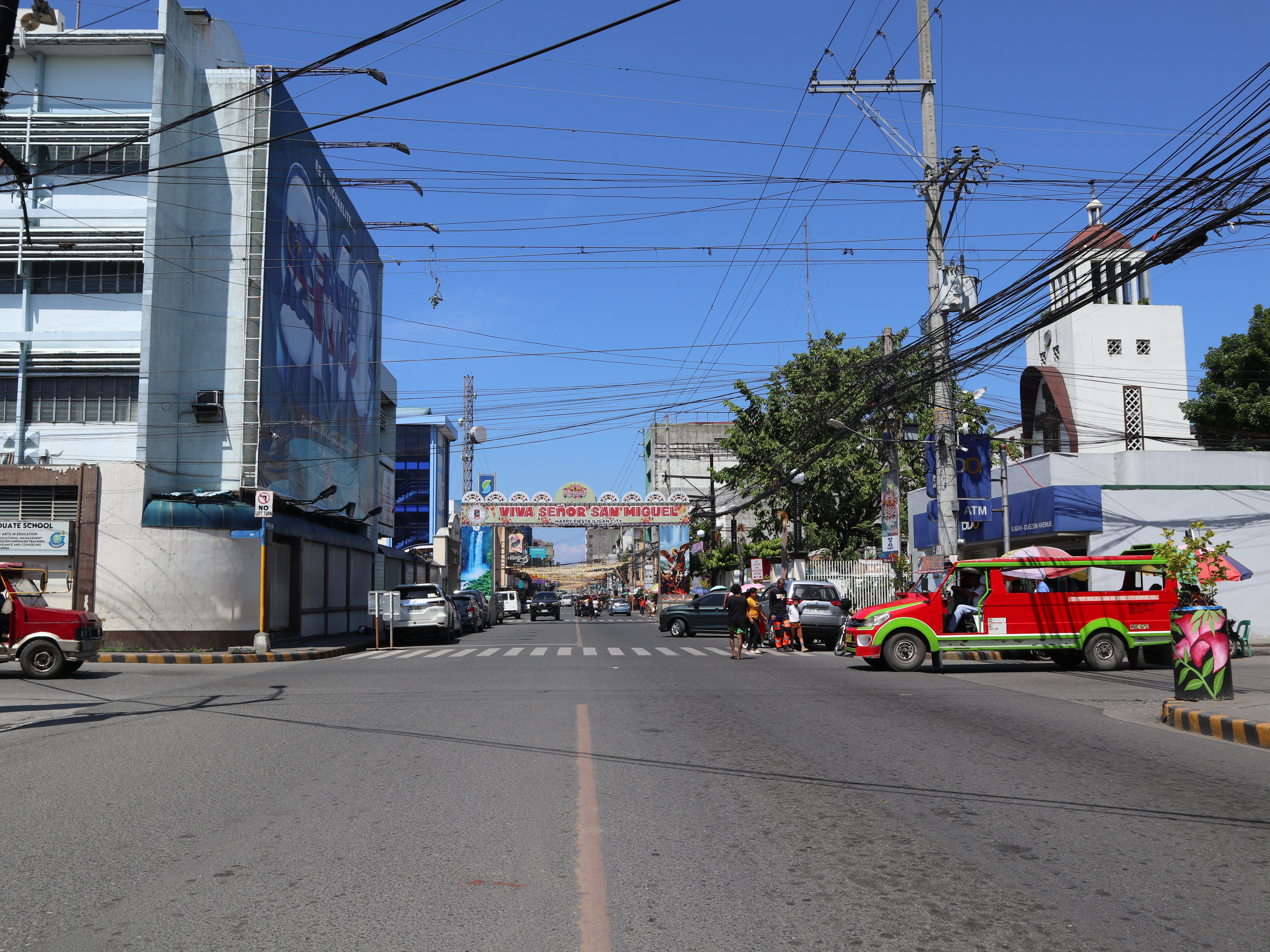
- (from top: left to right) Maria Cristina Falls, Provincial Capitol, Downtown Iligan, Port of Mukas in Kolambugan and Iligan Poblacion

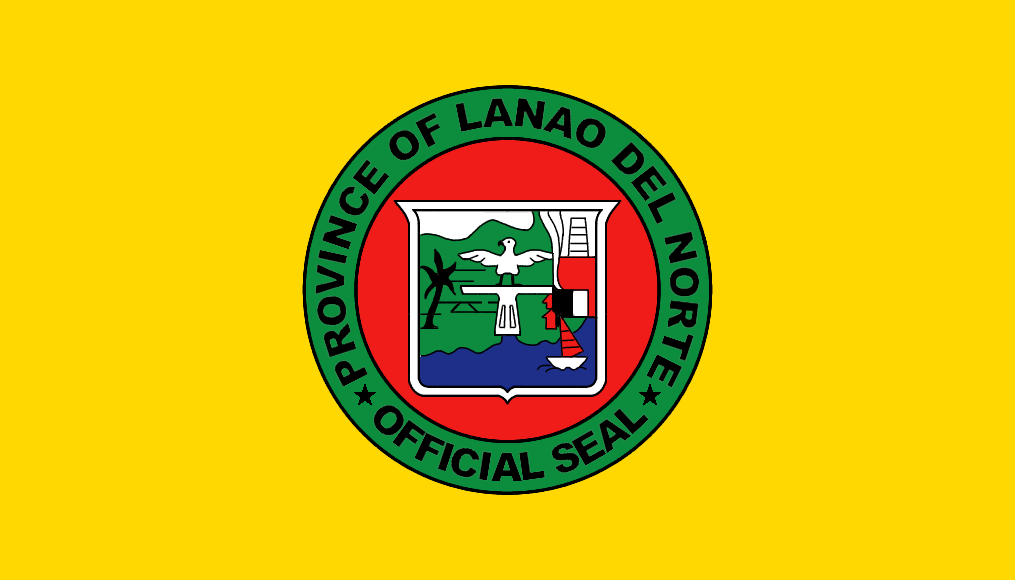
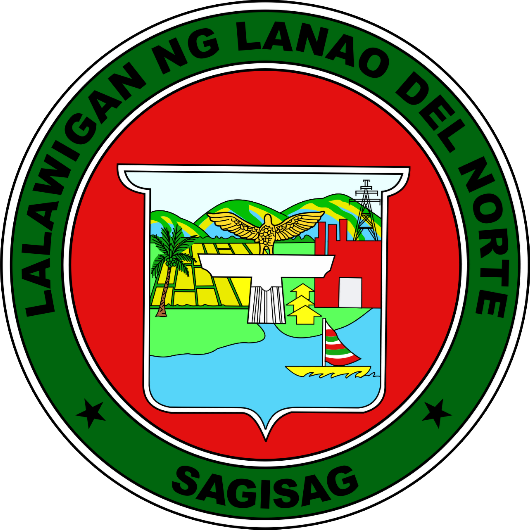
- Flag Seal
- Nicknames: "The Land of Beauty and Bounty" "Motocross Capital of the Philippines"
- Anthem: "Himno ng Lanao del Norte"
- Location in the Philippines
- Interactive map of Lanao del Norte
- Coordinates: 8°02′N 124°00′E
- Country: Philippines
- Region: Northern Mindanao
- Founded: May 22, 1959
- Capital: Tubod
- Largest city: Iligan*

Government
  - Governor: Mohamad Khalid Q. Dimaporo (Lakas)
  - Vice Governor: Allan Lim (Lakas)
  - Legislature: Lanao del Norte Provincial Board
  - Electorate: 573,261 voters (2025)

Area
  - Total: 3,354.16 km^{2} (1,295.05 sq mi)
  - Rank: 40th out of 82
- (excluding Iligan which is the First district)
- Highest elevation (Mount Inayawan): 1,535 m (5,036 ft)

Population (2024 census)
  - Total: 761,725
  - Rank: 42nd out of 82
  - Density: 227.099/km^{2} (588.183/sq mi)
  - Rank: 46th out of 82
  - Households: 161,458
- (excluding Iligan)
- Demonym: North Lanaonon

Divisions
  - Independent cities: 1: Iligan*
  - Component cities: 0
  - Municipalities: 22: Bacolod; Balo-i; Baroy; Kapatagan; Kauswagan; Kolambugan; Lala; Linamon; Magsaysay; Maigo; Matungao; Munai; Nunungan; Pantao Ragat; Pantar; Poona Piagapo; Salvador; Sapad; Sultan Naga Dimaporo; Tagoloan; Tangcal; Tubod
  - Barangays: 462; including independent city of Iligan: 506
  - Districts: Legislative districts of Lanao del Norte; Legislative district of Iligan

Economy
  - Income class: 1st provincial income class
  - Poverty incidence: 25.2% (2023)
  - Revenue: ₱ 2,539 million (2024)
  - Assets: ₱ 10,489 million (2024)
  - Expenditure: ₱ 1,002 million (2024)
  - Liabilities: ₱ 3,792 million (2024)
- Time zone: UTC+8 (PHT)
- PSGC: 103500000
- IDD : area code: +63 (0)63
- ISO 3166 code: PH-LAN
- Spoken languages: Cebuano; Maranao; Tagalog
- Website: www.lanaodelnorte.gov.ph
- * Iligan is a highly-urbanized city, politically independent from Lanao del Norte.

Lanao del Norte (Cebuano: Amihanang Lanao; Filipino: Hilagang Lanao; Maranao: Pangotaraan Ranao), officially the Province of Lanao del Norte, is a province in the Philippines located in the Northern Mindanao region. Its capital is Tubod.

The province borders Lanao del Sur to the southeast, Zamboanga del Sur to the west, Illana Bay to the southwest, Iligan Bay to the north, Misamis Oriental to the northeast, and is separated from Misamis Occidental by Panguil Bay to the northwest. According to the 2024 census, the province has a total population of 761,725 people.

Situated within Lanao del Norte is the highly urbanized city of Iligan, which is governed independently from the province and also the largest city in both land area and population.

== History ==
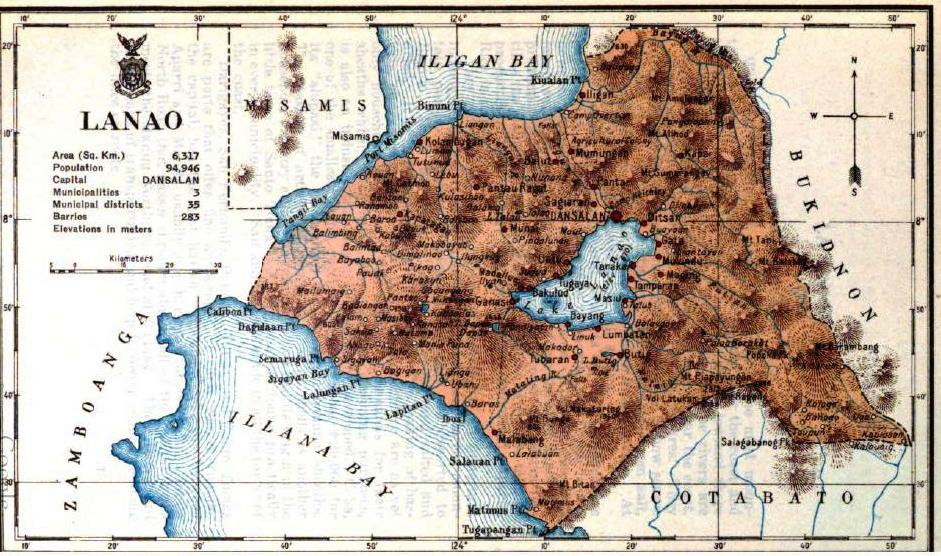
Lanao province map in 1918

The province of Lanao existed from 1914 until 1959. In 1959, Republic Act No. 222 was passed by the Philippine Congress, partitioning Lanao into two provinces: Lanao del Norte and Lanao del Sur. The new province was inaugurated on July 4, with Iligan as its capital. Back in the Spanish period, Iligan was founded by thousands of Visayan immigrants and garrisoned by a hundred Spanish soldiers.

The province then consisted of the municipalities of Balo-i, Kauswagan, Bacolod, Maigo, Kolambugan, Tubod, Baroy, Lala, Kapatagan, Karomatan and the following municipal districts that got converted into regular municipalities of Matungao, Pantao Ragat, Munai, Tangcal, and Nunungan.

In 1977, President Ferdinand E. Marcos signed Resolution No. 805, s. 1977 of the Sangguniang Panlalawigan (Parliamentary Bill No. 586) sponsored by Assemblyman Abdullah D. Dimaporo, into Presidential Decree 181 transferring the province's capital from Iligan to the municipality of Tubod.

In October 1984, inaugural ceremonies were held to celebrate the occasion of the transfer of the Provincial Capitol from Poblacion, Tubod to the Don Mariano Marcos Government Center (now Governor Arsenio A. Quibranza Provincial Government Center) at Pigcarangan, in Tubod.

Despite the outbreak of the conflict of the MILF led by Abdullah Commander Bravo Goldiano Macapaar bin Sabbar and the Philippine Army in Kauswagan in March 2000, through the provincial government's effort, peace and order was restored in the province.

In 2018, the Bangsamoro Organic Law was passed into law; this law provided for the establishment of a new Bangsamoro autonomous region to replace the Autonomous Region in Muslim Mindanao. According to this law, the six municipalities of Munai, Tagoloan, Pantar, Balo-i, Tangcal, and Nunungan would be incorporated into this new region should a majority of voters in both the affected municipality and the parent province vote in favor of inclusion of the aforementioned municipalities in the proposed autonomous region in a plebiscite. The plebiscite was held the following year. A majority of voters in the affected municipalities voted in favor of inclusion in the Bangsamoro Autonomous Region; however, the rest of Lanao del Norte voted strongly against, and as a result, none of the six municipalities were included in the new autonomous region after the provincial government campaigned against their inclusion.

== Geography ==
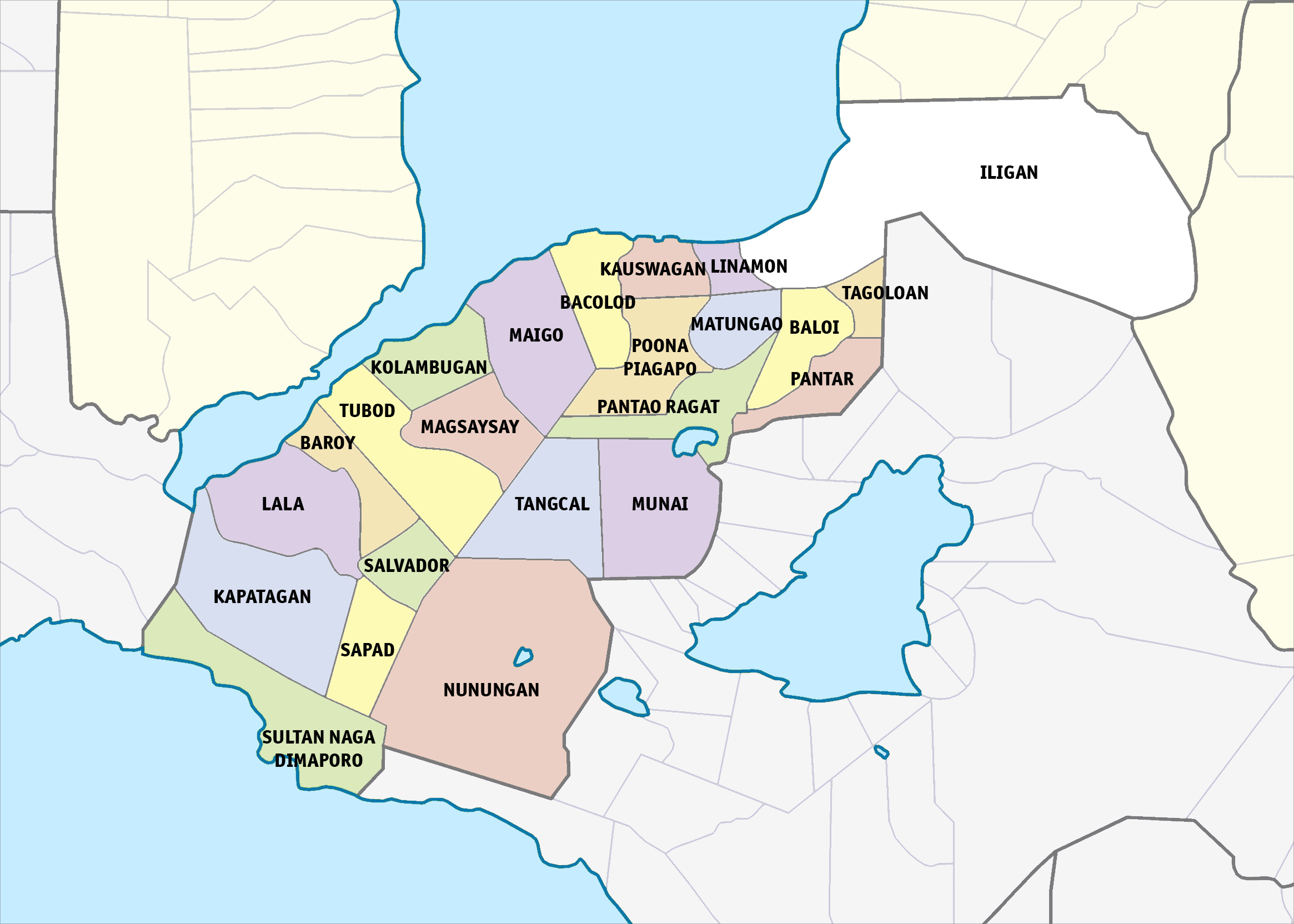
Political map of Lanao del Norte

Lanao del Norte is a rugged province that ranges from the coastal shorelines in the north to the high plateaus and mountains in the south. It has also diverse flora and fauna.

Lanao del Norte covers a total area of 3,346.57 square kilometres (1,292.12 sq mi) occupying the southwestern section of the Northern Mindanao region in Mindanao. When Iligan is included for geographical purposes, the province's land area is 4,159.94 square kilometres (1,606.16 sq mi). The province is bordered by Lanao del Sur to the southeast, Zamboanga del Sur to the west, Illana Bay to the southwest, Iligan Bay to the north, and Misamis Oriental to the northeast, and Panguil Bay to the northwest.

=== Administrative divisions ===
Lanao del Norte comprises 22 municipalities. The city of Iligan administers itself independently as a highly urbanized city.

- † Capital municipality
- Municipality
- ‡ Highly urbanized city (geographically within but independent from the province)
- ∞ Largest settlement

City or municipality^{[A]}		District	Population			±% p.a.	Area		Density		Barangay	Coordinates^{[B]}
			(2024)		(2020)		km^{2}	sq mi	/km^{2}	/sq mi		
Bacolod		1st	3.3%	24,963	24,367	+0.57%	104.10	40.19	240	620	16	8°11′25″N 124°01′13″E
Balo-i		1st	9.7%	74,003	68,465	+1.85%	90.98	35.13	810	2,100	21	8°06′52″N 124°13′16″E
Baroy		1st	3.3%	24,763	24,683	+0.08%	72.35	27.93	340	880	23	8°01′32″N 123°46′44″E
Iligan City∞	‡	Lone District	—	368,132	363,115	+0.32%	813.37	314.04	450	1,200	44	8°13′43″N 124°14′17″E
Kapatagan		2nd	9.6%	72,762	62,571	+3.61%	242.89	93.78	300	780	33	7°53′54″N 123°46′11″E
Kauswagan		1st	3.3%	25,515	24,193	+1.26%	60.37	23.31	420	1,100	13	8°11′29″N 124°05′17″E
Kolambugan		1st	3.7%	28,545	28,265	+0.23%	134.55	51.95	210	540	26	8°06′43″N 123°53′45″E
Lala		2nd	9.8%	75,015	73,425	+0.51%	140.25	54.15	530	1,400	27	7°58′23″N 123°44′51″E
Linamon		1st	2.8%	21,385	21,269	+0.13%	76.38	29.49	280	730	8	8°10′58″N 124°09′42″E
Magsaysay		2nd	2.7%	20,581	20,463	+0.14%	151.83	58.62	140	360	24	8°02′08″N 123°54′49″E
Maigo		1st	3.1%	23,400	23,337	+0.06%	121.45	46.89	190	490	13	8°09′33″N 123°57′32″E
Matungao		1st	2.2%	16,404	14,756	+2.52%	45.74	17.66	360	930	12	8°08′00″N 124°09′59″E
Munai		2nd	4.8%	36,449	35,020	+0.95%	197.50	76.26	180	470	26	7°58′21″N 124°03′42″E
Nunungan		2nd	2.5%	19,036	18,827	+0.26%	473.28	182.73	40	100	25	7°48′39″N 123°56′39″E
Pantao Ragat		2nd	4.3%	32,557	30,247	+1.75%	124.30	47.99	260	670	20	8°03′36″N 124°10′56″E
Pantar		1st	3.6%	27,300	26,599	+0.61%	70.40	27.18	390	1,000	21	8°03′52″N 124°15′47″E
Poona Piagapo		2nd	4.0%	30,666	29,183	+1.17%	260.07	100.41	120	310	26	8°04′58″N 124°08′27″E
Salvador		2nd	4.5%	34,053	32,115	+1.39%	113.99	44.01	300	780	25	7°54′10″N 123°50′28″E
Sapad		2nd	3.3%	24,826	22,974	+1.84%	140.03	54.07	180	470	17	7°50′43″N 123°50′13″E
Sultan Naga Dimaporo		2nd	8.6%	65,656	60,904	+1.78%	230.99	89.19	280	730	37	7°47′42″N 123°42′55″E
Tagoloan		1st	2.1%	16,204	15,091	+1.69%	69.70	26.91	230	600	7	8°07′37″N 124°16′33″E
Tangcal		2nd	2.3%	17,247	16,075	+1.67%	178.62	68.97	97	250	18	7°59′47″N 123°59′50″E
Tubod	†	1st	6.6%	50,395	50,073	+0.15%	246.80	95.29	200	520	24	8°03′12″N 123°47′30″E
Total^{[C]}				761,725	722,902	+1.24%	3,346.57	1,292.12	230	600	462	(see GeoGroup box)
1. Former names are italicized.; 2. Coordinates are sortable by latitude. (Italicized entries indicate the generic location. Otherwise, they mark the city or town center).; 3. Total figures exclude the highly urbanized city of Iligan.

== Demographics ==
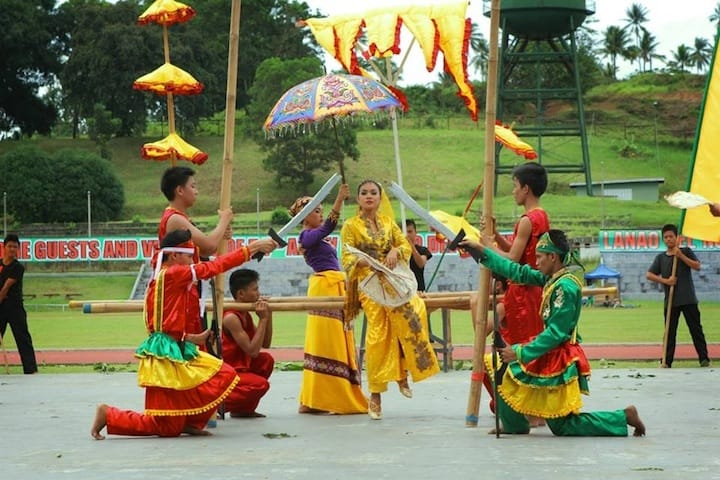
People in traditional Maranao attire doing a performance as part of the Araw ng Lanao del Norte (lit. 'Lanao del Norte Day') festivities.

Population census of Lanao del Norte
Year	Pop.	±% p.a.
1903	8,272	—
1918	25,928	+7.91%
1939	99,427	+6.61%
1948	131,606	+3.16%
1960	270,603	+6.19%
1970	245,449	−0.97%
1975	262,456	+1.35%
1980	293,691	+2.27%
1990	387,524	+2.81%
1995	440,783	+2.44%
2000	473,062	+1.53%
2007	538,283	+1.80%
2010	607,917	+4.53%
2015	676,395	+2.05%
2020	722,902	+1.41%
2024	761,725	+1.26%
(excluding Iligan); Source: Philippine Statistics Authority

Languages Spoken (incl. Iligan City, 2010)
Language	Speakers
Cebuano/Bisaya/Boholano	601,525
Maranao	283,007
Others	43,740

The population of Lanao del Norte in the 2024 census was 761,725 people, with a density of 230 inhabitants per square kilometre or 600 inhabitants per square mile. When Iligan is included for geographical purposes, the province's population is 1,129,857, with a density of 272 inhabitants per square kilometre (700/sq mi).

The people in Lanao del Norte are a mixture of Maranaos and Cebuanos, with some Maguindanaons, Zamboangueños, Subanens, Tausugs, Yakans, and Sama-Bajaus. Historically, immigrants who came from the Christian provinces of Mindanao, Visayas and Luzon tended to settle in the northern part of Lanao while the Maranaos inhabited the south. There are also a minority of Higaonons settling in the hinterlands of Iligan. Kankanaey, an ethnic group from the Cordilleras in Luzon, can also be found as a minority in the province.

The Maranao had settled in the area long before the arrival of the Spaniards in the Philippines. Like other groups, they possess their own culture which makes them quite unique. Their language, customs, traditions, religion, social system, costumes, music, and other features are factors that make Lanao peculiar and distinct from other Philippine provinces.

The main languages are Maranao, Cebuano, and Binukid, with the latter being the native language of majority of the citizens of the province.

=== Religion ===
Religion in Lanao del Norte (2020)
Religion	percentage
Roman Catholic	47.3%
Islam	45.5%
Other Christian, including Protestants	6.4%
Others	0.8%

According to the Philippine Statistics Authority (PSA) report in 2020, Roman Catholicism makeup for 47.3% of the population of Lanao del Norte while 45.5% are adherents of Islam. Other religions include other denominations of Christianity, Buddhism and other beliefs.

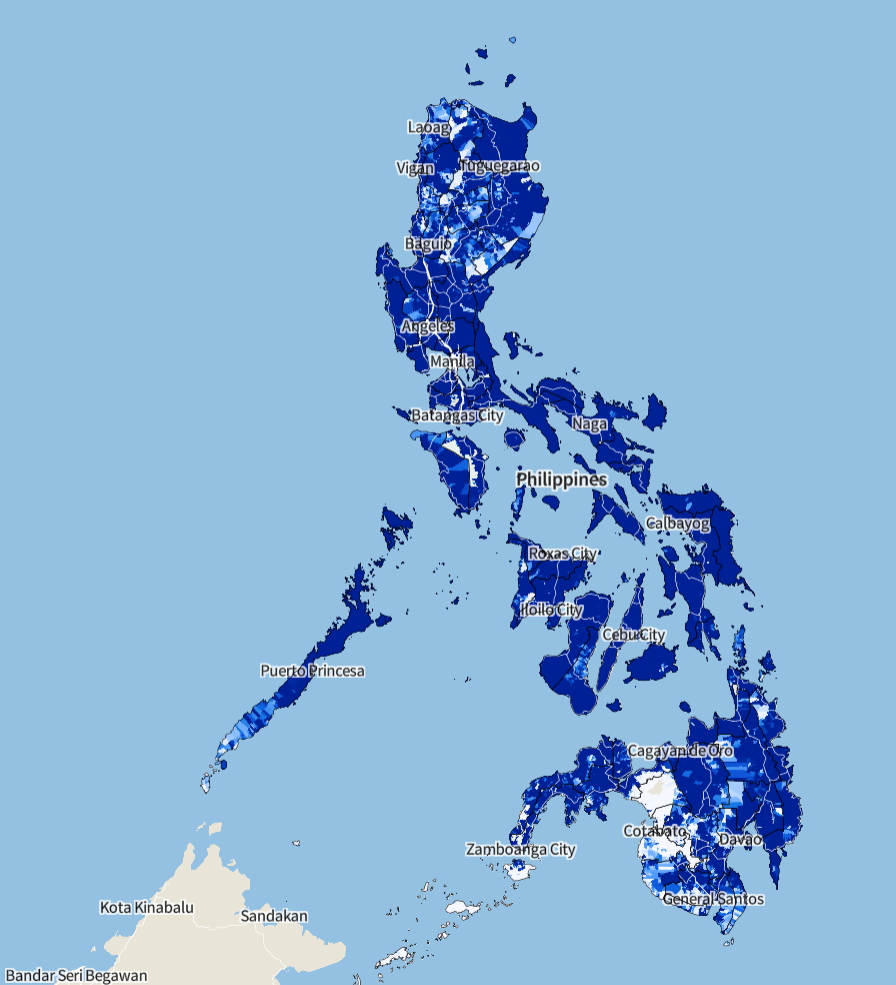
Concentration of Roman Catholics show that most of them can be found in the coastal areas in the province. The remaining mountainous southern half may be home to Muslims.

== Economy ==
Poverty incidence of Lanao del Norte (%)

Source: Philippine Statistics Authority

The economy in Lanao del Norte is predominantly based on agriculture and fishing. Factories are mostly based in Iligan City. Lanao del Norte is the home of Agus Power plants 4-7 that stretch from Balo-i to Iligan. It serves major parts of power supply in Mindanao. Tourism is also a growing economy in the province.

== Politics and government ==
Salvador T. Lluch was the first Governor of Lanao del Norte. Second was Mohammad Ali Dimaporo, who ruled from January 1960 to September 1965 when he ran and won the congressional seat of the province. By operation of the law of succession, Vice Governor Arsenio A. Quibranza became the third Provincial Chief Executive of the province. By the mandate of the inhabitants, Quibranza was elected governor in 1967 and almost unanimously re-elected in 1971 and again in 1980. When Martial Law was declared, Quibranza was arrested as ordered by President Marcos. While in prison, Vice Governor "Toto" Felix Z. Actub would succeed him as Governor

Following the People Power Revolution in 1986, local government all over the Philippines was overhauled overnight. Lanao del Norte became one among the many provinces affected by the sudden changes brought by the "Snap Election" in February 1986. Local heads of offices and employees particularly those holding political positions were removed but with the installation of President Corazon Aquino as president, OIC Atty. Francisco L. Abalos became the appointed governor of the province on March 3, 1986. On February 2, 1988, Abalos was elected as governor of the province.

In the general election of May 11, 1992, Congressman Abdullah D. Dimaporo, a legislator, economist and son of Mohammad Ali Dimaporo, was elected Provincial Governor. The Provincial government embarked on a comprehensive planning and set the groundwork for the development of the province.

In the 1998 general elections, Imelda Quibranza-Dimaporo, wife of Governor Abdullah D. Dimaporo was elected as Provincial Governor until 2007, and from 2016 up to present.

The eldest son of former governor and now 2nd district representative Abdullah D. Dimaporo and Imelda Q. Dimaporo, Mohammad Khalid Q. Dimaporo entered politics in 2007.

== Notable persons ==
=== Within the province's jurisdiction ===
- Marlon Tapales - Professional Boxer (Kapatagan)

== See also ==
- Lanao
- Lanao del Sur
