= Laws of the 14th Congress of the Philippines =

Laws passed by 14th Congress of Philippines

The following is the list of laws passed by the 14th Congress of the Philippines:

Date approved	RA number	Title/category	Affected municipality or city	Affected province
2008-02-28	9496	Amending the Agricultural Tariffication Act or RA 8178 : Extending the Utilization Period of the Agricultural Competitiveness Enhancement Fund		
2008-03-04	9497	Civil Aviation Authority Act of 2008		
2008-03-11	9498	Appropriations Act of 2008		
2008-04-09	9499	Filipino World War II Veterans Pensions and Benefits Act of 2008		
2008-04-29	9500	The University of the Philippines Charter of 2008		
2008-05-23	9501	Amending the Magna Carta for Small Enterprises or RA 6977 : Magna Carta for Micro, Small, and Medium Enterprises (MSMEs)		
2008-06-06	9502	Amending RA 8293, RA 6675, and RA 5921 : Universally Accessible Cheaper and Quality Medicines Act of 2008		
2008-06-12	9503	Amending RA 1125 : Enlarging the Organizational Structure of the Court of Tax Appeals		
2008-06-17	9504	Amending the National Internal Revenue Code of 1997 or RA 8424		
2008-08-22	9505	Personal Equity and Retirement Account (PERA) Act of 2008		
2008-09-28	9506	Bacolor Rehabilitation Council Act	Bacolor	Pampanga
2008-10-13	9507	Socialized and Low-Cost Housing loan Restructuring and Condonation Act of 2008		
2008-10-20	9508	Reapportioning Legislative Districts of a Province	[First] Bayugan City, Sibagat, Prosperidad, Talacogon, San Luis, and Esperanza; [Second] San Francisco, Rosario, Bunawan, Trento, Santa Josefa, Veruela, Loreto, and La Paz	Agusan Del Sur
2008-10-21	9509	Barangay Livelihood and Skills Training Act of 2008		
2008-10-31	9510	Credit Information System Act		
2008-12-01	9511	Electricity Transmission Franchise : National Grid Corporation		
2008-12-12	9512	Environmental Awareness and Education Act of 2008		
2008-12-16	9513	Renewable Energy Act of 2008		
2008-12-19	9514	Fire Code of the Philippines of 2008 : Repealing PD 1185		
2008-12-19	9515	Defining the Liability of Ship Agents in the Tramp Service		
2008-12-22	9516	Amending PD 1866 : On Unlawful Manufacture, Sales, Acquisition, Disposition, Importation, or Possession of Explosives or Incendiary Devices and of Parts, Ingredients, Machinery, Tool, or Instrument Used or Intended for these Unlawful Activities		
2008-12-27	9517	Air Transport Franchise for Domestic and International Service : Southeast Asian Airlines (SEAir), Inc.		
2008-12-27	9518	Local Exchange Network Franchise : Metro Kidapawan Telephone Corporation (MKTC)		Cotabato
2009-01-07	9519	Converting a State College into a State University : Mindanao University of Science and Technology (MUST)		Misamis Occidental, and Misamis Oriental
2009-02-17	9520	Amending the Cooperative Code of the Philippines or RA 6938 : the Philippine Cooperative Code of 2008		
2009-03-05	9521	National Book Development Trust Fund Act		
2009-03-10	9522	Amending the Archipelagic Baselines of the Territorial Sea of the Philippines, or RA 3046 and RA 5446 (Read about the Convention)		
2009-03-12	9523	Amending the Domestic Adoption Act of 1998 (RA 8552), the Inter-Country Adoption Act of 1995 (RA 8043) and the Child and Youth Welfare Code (PD 603) : Requiring the Certification of the DSWD in a Child's Availability for Adoption		
2009-03-12	9524	Appropriations Act of 2009		
2009-03-23	9525	Supplemental Appropriations for an Automated Election System		
2009-03-24	9526	Converting an Elementary School into an Integrated School: Eulogio Rodriguez Integrated School	Mandaluyong	NCR
2009-03-24	9527	Converting an Elementary School into an Integrated School: Highway Hills Integrated School	Mandaluyong	NCR
2009-03-24	9528	Converting an Elementary School Annex into an Independent Elementary School : Pleasant Hills Elementary School	Mandaluyong	NCR
2009-03-24	9529	Establishing a National High School : Tinagacan National High School	General Santos	South Cotabato
2009-03-24	9530	Establishing a National High School : Magdaup National High School	Ipil	Zamboanga Sibugay
2009-03-24	9531	Establishing a National High School : Southern Davao National High School	Panabo City	Davao Del Norte
2009-03-24	9532	Establishing a National High School : Camaman-an National High School	Cagayan de Oro	Misamis Oriental
2009-03-24	9533	Establishing a National High School : Tuy National High School	Tuy	Batangas
2009-03-24	9534	Establishing a National High School : Vega National High School	Bongabon	Nueva Ecija
2009-03-24	9535	Establishing a National High School : Dangay National High School	Roxas	Oriental Mindoro
2009-03-24	9536	Amending RA 8569 : Establishing a National High School : Gov. Jacinto C. Borja National High School	Loon	Bohol
2009-03-24	9537	Establishing a National Science High School : Agusan Del Sur National Science High School	Prosperidad	Agusan Del Sur
2009-03-24	9538	Establishing an Integrated School : Rizal Integrated National School	Sorsogon City	Sorsogon
2009-03-24	9539	Establishing a National High School : Mount Carmel National High School	Bayugan City	Agusan Del Sur
2009-03-24	9540	Establishing a National High School : Padada National High School	Padada	Davao Del Sur
2009-03-24	9541	Establishing a National High School : Del Pilar National High School	Cagdianao	Dinagat Islands
2009-03-24	9542	Establishing a National High School : Dinapa National High School	Castilla	Sorsogon
2009-03-24	9543	Establishing a National High School : San Roque National High School	Bulalacao	Oriental Mindoro
2009-03-24	9544	Establishing a National High School : Ganao National High School	Dupax Del Sur	Nueva Vizcaya
2009-03-24	9545	Establishing a National High School : Tuba Central National High School	Tuba	Benguet
2009-03-24	9546	Establishing a National High School : Guinoman National High School	Diplahan	Zamboanga Sibugay
2009-04-01	9547	Amending the Special Program for Employment of Students or RA 7323 : Strengthening and Expanding Coverage of the Program [Amended by: RA 10917]		
2009-04-17	9548	Establishing an Arts and Culture High School : Bikol High School for the Arts and Culture	Pili	Camarines Sur
2009-04-17	9549	Establishing a National High School : Poblacion Comprehensive National High School	Lakewood	Zamboanga Del Sur
2009-04-17	9550	Establishing a National High School : Minoyan National High School	Murcia	Negros Occidental
2009-04-17	9551	Establishing a National High School : Bogayo National High School	Kumalarang	Zamboanga Del Sur
2009-04-17	9552	Establishing a National High School : Lagawe National High School	Lagawe	Ifugao
2009-04-17	9553	Establishing an Integrated School : Buhatan Integrated National School	Sorsogon City	Sorsogon
2009-04-17	9554	Establishing an Integrated National High School : Binalian Integrated National High School	Kayapa	Nueva Vizcaya
2009-04-17	9555	Establishing a National High School : Napo-Tuyak National High School	Kayapa	Nueva Vizcaya
2009-04-17	9556	Establishing a National High School : Sagucan National High School	Vincenzo A. Sagun	Zamboanga Del Sur
2009-04-17	9557	Establishing a National High School : Felimon M. Salcedo, Sr. Memorial National High School	Bansud	Oriental Mindoro
2009-04-17	9558	Establishing a National High School : San Antonio National High School	Ozamiz City	Misamis Occidental
2009-04-17	9559	Establishing a National High School : Bululawan National High School	Lakewood	Zamboanga Del Sur
2009-04-17	9560	Establishing a National High School : Handumon National High School	Getafe	Bohol
2009-04-17	9561	Establishing a National High School : Panlayaan National High School	Sorsogon City	Sorsogon
2009-04-17	9562	Establishing a National High School : Bayasong National High School	Pilar	Sorsogon
2009-04-17	9563	Establishing a National High School : Togoron National High School	Monreal	Masbate
2009-04-17	9564	Establishing a National High School : Libayoy National High School	Tigbao	Zamboanga Del Sur
2009-04-17	9565	Establishing a National High School : Picanan National High School	Kumalarang	Zamboanga Del Sur
2009-04-17	9566	Establishing a National High School : San Jose National High School	Libjo	Dinagat Islands
2009-04-17	9567	Establishing a National High School : Mabunao National High School	Panabo City	Davao Del Norte
2009-04-17	9568	Establishing a National High School : Katipunan National High School	Silago	Southern Leyte
2009-04-17	9569	Establishing a National High School : Bernardino B. Bosque National High School	Davao City	Davao Del Sur
2009-04-17	9570	Establishing a National High School : Dimanpudso National High School	Maria Aurora	Aurora
2009-04-17	9571	Establishing a National High School : Catmon National High School	Santa Maria	Bulacan
2009-04-17	9572	Establishing a National High School : Congressman Hilarion J. Ramiro, Jr. Memorial National High School	Clarin	Misamis Occidental
2009-04-17	9573	Establishing a National High School : Bulihan National High School	Malolos City	Bulacan
2009-04-17	9574	Establishing a National High School : Mabini National High School	Mabini	Batangas
2009-04-17	9575	Establishing a National High School : Picong National High School	Picong	Lanao Del Sur
2009-04-29	9576	Amending the Philippine Deposit Insurance Corporation (PDIC) Charter or RA 3591 : Increasing the Maximum Deposit Insurance Coverage and Strengthening the Regulatory and Administrative and Financial Capability of PDIC		
2009-04-30	9577	Establishing a National High School : Lianga National Comprehensive High School	Lianga	Surigao Del Sur
2009-04-30	9578	Establishing a National High School : Jupi National High School	Gubat	Sorsogon
2009-04-30	9579	Establishing a National High School : Gate National High School	Bulan	Sorsogon
2009-04-30	9580	Establishing a National High School : Naneng National High School	Tabuk City	Kalinga
2009-04-30	9581	Establishing a National High School : Recodo National High School	Zamboanga City	Zamboanga Del Sur
2009-04-30	9582	Establishing a National High School : Datu Jose A. Libayao Memorial National High School	Talaingod	Davao Del Norte
2009-04-30	9583	Establishing a National High School : Mesaoy National High School	New Corella	Davao Del Norte
2009-04-30	9584	Establishing a National High School : Sagayen National High School	Asuncion	Davao Del Norte
2009-04-30	9585	Establishing a National High School : Semong National High School	Kapalong	Davao Del Norte
2009-04-30	9586	Establishing a National High School : Marayag National High School	Lupon	Davao Oriental
2009-04-30	9587	Establishing a National High School : Mailhi National High School	Baybay City	Leyte
2009-04-30	9588	Establishing a National High School : Sinubong National High School	Zamboanga City	Zamboanga Del Sur
2009-04-30	9589	Establishing a National High School : Cadandanan National High School	Bulan	Sorsogon
2009-04-30	9590	Establishing a National High School : Lajong National High School	Juban	Sorsogon
2009-05-01	9591	Amending the Charter of the City of Malolos or RA 8754 : Creating a Legislative District : Lone District of the City of Malolos	Malolos City	Bulacan
2009-05-08	9592	Amending the Bureau of Fire Protection and Bureau of Jail Management and Penology Professionalization Act of 2004 or RA 9263 : Extending for 5 Years the Reglementary Period for Complying with the Educational Qualification and Eligibility for Appointment		
2009-05-12	9593	The Tourism Act of 2009		
2009-05-13	9594	Establishing a National High School : Capisan National High School	Zamboanga City	Zamboanga Del Sur
2009-05-13	9595	Establishing a National High School : Salapungan National High School	San Rafael	Bulacan
2009-05-13	9596	Establishing a National High School : Santo Tomas National High School	Santo Tomas	La Union
2009-05-13	9597	Establishing a National High School : Saravia National High School	Koronadal City	South Cotabato
2009-05-13	9598	Establishing a National High School : Timalang National High School	Ipil	Zamboanga Sibugay
2009-05-13	9599	Establishing a National High School : Dacudac National High School	Tadian	Mountain Province
2009-05-13	9600	Establishing a National High School : Buringal National High School	Paracelis	Mountain Province
2009-05-13	9601	Establishing a National High School : Data National High School	Sabangan	Mountain Province
2009-05-13	9602	Establishing a National High School : Tamboan National High School	Besao	Mountain Province
2009-05-13	9603	Establishing a National High School : Saclit National High School	Sadanga	Mountain Province
2009-05-13	9604	Establishing a National High School : Abatan National High School	Bauko	Mountain Province
2009-05-13	9605	Establishing a National High School : Talon-Talon National High School	Zamboanga City	Zamboanga Del Sur
2009-05-13	9606	Establishing a National High School : Bunguiao National High School	Zamboanga City	Zamboanga Del Sur
2009-05-13	9607	Establishing a National High School : FVR National High School	Norzagaray	Bulacan
2009-05-13	9608	Establishing a National High School : Don Mariano Marcos National High School	Lupon	Davao Oriental
2009-05-13	9609	Establishing a National High School : Paradise Embac National High School	Davao City	Davao Del Sur
2009-05-13	9610	Establishing a National High School : Eusebia Paz Arroyo Memorial National High School	Baao	Camarines Sur
2009-05-13	9611	Establishing a National High School : Graceville National High School	San Jose Del Monte City	Bulacan
2009-05-13	9612	Establishing a National High School : Eastern Laua-an National High School	Laua-an	Antique
2009-05-13	9613	Establishing a National High School : Calipayan National High School	Santa Ignacia	Tarlac
2009-05-13	9614	Establishing a National High School : Moncada National High School	Moncada	Tarlac
2009-05-13	9615	Establishing a National High School : Tingco National High School	Pilar	Sorsogon
2009-05-13	9616	Establishing a National High School : Palanas National High School	Pilar	Sorsogon
2009-05-13	9617	Establishing a National High School : San Leonardo National High School	San Leonardo	Nueva Ecija
2009-05-13	9618	Establishing a National High School : Southern Tinglayan National High School	Tinglayan	Kalinga
2009-05-13	9619	Establishing a National High School : Lilo-an National High School	Ormoc City	Leyte
2009-05-13	9620	Converting a Science High School into a National Science High School : Negros Occidental National Science High School	Victorias City	Negros Occidental
2009-05-13	9621	Establishing a National Agro-Industrial High School : Camarines Sur National Agro-Industrial High School	Calabanga	Camarines Sur
2009-05-13	9622	Establishing a National High School : Bangbang National High School	Hungduan	Ifugao
2009-05-13	9623	Establishing a National High School : Agoncillo National High School	Agoncillo	Batangas
2009-05-13	9624	Establishing a National High School : Kauswagan National High School	Panabo City	Davao Del Norte
2009-05-13	9625	Establishing a National High School : Mecolong National High School	Dumalinao	Zamboanga Del Sur
2009-05-13	9626	Establishing a National High School : Balintawak National High School	Margosatubig	Zamboanga Del Sur
2009-05-13	9627	Establishing a National High School : Malaking Ilog National High School	San Pascual	Masbate
2009-05-13	9628	Converting a High School into a National High School : Pilar National Comprehensive High School	Pilar	Sorsogon
2009-05-13	9629	Establishing a National High School : Lubuagan National High School	Lubuagan	Kalinga
2009-05-13	9630	Establishing a Science High School : Davao Oriental Regional Science High School	Mati City	Davao Oriental
2009-05-13	9631	Establishing a National High School : Tandubuay National High School	San Pablo	Zamboanga Del Sur
2009-05-13	9632	Establishing a National High School : Maruing National High School	Lapuyan	Zamboanga Del Sur
2009-05-13	9633	Establishing a National High School : Guling National High School	Guipos	Zamboanga Del Sur
2009-05-13	9634	Establishing a National High School : Teniapan National High School	San Pablo	Zamboanga Del Sur
2009-05-13	9635	Establishing a National High School : Panubigan National High School	Pitogo	Zamboanga Del Sur
2009-05-13	9636	Establishing a National High School : Indahag National High School	Cagayan de Oro	Misamis Oriental
2009-05-13	9637	Establishing a National High School : Pagayawan National High School	Pagayawan	Lanao Del Sur
2009-05-13	9638	Converting a High School Annex into an Independent National High School : Roxas National High School	San Isidro	Surigao Del Norte
2009-05-13	9639	Converting a High School Annex into an Independent National High School : Santa Fe National High School	General Luna	Surigao Del Norte
2009-05-21	9640	Amending the Local Government Code of 1991 or RA 7160 : On Amusement Tax		
2009-05-29	9641	Changing the Name of a National High School : Don Felix T. Lacson Memorial National High School	Silay City	Negros Occidental
2009-06-11	9642	Declaring Every March 16 as Special Nonworking Holiday in Romblon Province in Commemoration of its Foundation		Romblon
2009-06-11	9643	Declaring Every March 21 a Special Nonworking Holiday in Victorias City in Commemoration of its Conversion into a Component City	Victorias City	Negros Occidental
2009-06-11	9644	Declaring Every August 28 a Special Nonworking Holiday in Cagayan De Oro City for the Feast of St. Augustine	Cagayan de Oro	Misamis Oriental
2009-06-12	9645	Amending the Administrative Code of 1987 or EO 292 : the Commemoration of the Foundation of Iglesia ni Cristo Every July 27 as a National Holiday		
2009-06-29	9646	Real Estate Service Act of the Philippines		
2009-06-30	9647	Philippine Normal University Modernization Act of 2009		
2009-06-30	9648	Amending the National Internal Revenue Code of 1997 or RA 8424 : Exempting from Documentary Stamp Tax any Sale, Barter, or Exchange of Shares of Stock Listed and Traded through the Stock Exchange		
2009-07-07	9649	Amending the Charter of the City of General Santos or RA 5412	General Santos	South Cotabato
2009-07-07	9650	Establishing a National High School : Bambang National High School	Bocaue	Bulacan
2009-07-07	9651	Establishing a National Science High School : Siargao National Science High School	Dapa	Surigao Del Norte
2009-07-12	9652	Radio and Television Franchise : Information Broadcast Unlimited, Inc.		
2009-07-14	9653	Rent Control Act of 2009 (Residential)		
2009-07-17	9654	Declaring Every July 18 a Special Nonworking Holiday in the South Cotabato Province in Commemoration of its Foundation and Culmination of the T'nalak Festival		South Cotabato
2009-07-17	9655	Changing the Name of a National High School : Malanday National High School	Marikina	NCR
2009-07-17	9656	Establishing a National High School : Angat National High School	Angat	Bulacan
2009-07-17	9657	Establishing a National High School : Santo Niño National High School	Marikina	NCR
2009-07-17	9658	Establishing a National High School : Lian National High School	Lian	Batangas
2009-07-17	9659	Converting a High School Annex into an Independent National High School : Vicente P. Trinidad National High School	Valenzuela City	NCR
2009-07-17	9660	Converting a High School Annex into an Independent National High School : Bignay National High School	Valenzuela City	NCR
2009-07-17	9661	Establishing a National High School : Minuyan National High School	San Jose Del Monte City	Bulacan
2009-07-17	9662	Establishing a National Science High School : City of San Jose Del Monte National Science High School	San Jose Del Monte City	Bulacan
2009-07-17	9663	Converting a High School Annex into an Independent National High School : Cupang National High School	Antipolo City	Rizal
2009-07-17	9664	Converting a High School Annex into an Independent National High School : Ganduz National High School	Pantabangan	Nueva Ecija
2009-07-17	9665	Establishing a National High School : Baesa National High School	Quezon City	NCR
2009-07-17	9666	Converting a High School Annex into an Independent National High School : Santo Niño 3rd National High School	San Jose City	Nueva Ecija
2009-07-17	9667	Converting a High School Annex into an Independent National High School : Burgos National High School	Carranglan	Nueva Ecija
2009-07-17	9668	Establishing a National Agro-Industrial High School : Governor Felicisimo T. San Luis National Agro-Industrial High School	Siniloan	Laguna
2009-07-17	9669	Converting a High School Annex into an Independent National High School : Arkong Bato National High School	Valenzuela City	NCR
2009-07-17	9670	Establishing a National High School : Apolonio Samson National High School	Quezon City	NCR
2009-07-17	9671	Converting a High School into a National High School : Botolan National High School	Botolan	Zambales
2009-07-17	9672	Establishing a National Science and Technology High School : Caloocan National Science and Technology High School	Caloocan	NCR
2009-07-17	9673	Establishing a National High School : San Roque National High School	Marikina	NCR
2009-07-17	9674	Establishing a National High School : Barangka National High School	Marikina	NCR
2009-07-17	9675	Converting a High School into a National High School : Panan National High School	Botolan	Zambales
2009-07-17	9676	Converting a Science High School Annex into an Independent Science High School : Caloocan City Science High School	Caloocan	NCR
2009-07-17	9677	Converting a High School into a National High School : New Taugtog National High School	Botolan	Zambales
2009-07-17	9678	Establishing a National High School : Kalumpang National High School	Marikina	NCR
2009-07-21	9679	Home Development Mutual Fund Law of 2009 : Repealing the Housing Loan Condonation Act of 1998 or RA 8501		
2009-07-29	9680	Creating additional Branches of the Regional Trial Court	Balanga, Mariveles, Dinalupihan	Bataan
2009-07-29	9681	Converting a High School into a National High School : San Ildefonso National High School	San Ildefonso	Bulacan
2009-08-01	9682	Local Exchange Network Franchise : Panay Telephone Corporation (PANTELCO III)	Cabatuan, Janiuay, Calinog, Lambunao, Mina, and Badiangan	Iloilo
2009-08-04	9683	Declaring Every September 18 as Special Nonworking Holiday in Bislig City in Commemoration of its Cityhood	Bislig	Surigao Del Sur
2009-08-04	9684	Renaming a Bridge : Gil Fernando Bridge	Marikina	NCR
2009-08-04	9685	Renaming a Road : Jaime Cardinal Sin Avenue	Kalibo, and New Washington	Aklan
2009-08-04	9686	Renaming a Road : Gov. Felix O. Alfelor, Sr. National Highway	[Albay] Malinao; [Camarines Sur] Buhi, Iriga City, and Ocampo	Albay, Camarines Sur
2009-08-04	9687	Renaming a Road : Maximino Noble Sr. Highway	Iriga City, and Buhi	Camarines Sur
2009-08-04	9688	Establishing a District Engineering Office	Banaue, Mayoyao, Aguinaldo, and Alfonso Lista	Ifugao
2009-08-04	9689	Establishing a District Engineering Office	Barcelona, Prieto Diaz, Gubat, Juban, Bulusan, Irosin, Santa Magdalena, Matnog, and Bulan	Sorsogon
2009-08-04	9690	Establishing a District Engineering Office	Cagayan de Oro	Misamis Oriental
2009-08-04	9691	Establishing a District Engineering Office	Lebak, Kalamansig, Senator Ninoy Aquino, Bagumbayan, Palimbang, and Esperanza	Sultan Kudarat
2009-08-04	9692	Establishing a District Engineering Office	Ozamiz City, Tangub City, Sinacaban, Tudela, Clarin, Bonifacio, and Don Victoriano	Misamis Occidental
2009-08-04	9693	Reconstituting a District Engineering Office	[First] Tabaco City, Tiwi, Malinao, Malilipot, Bacacay, and Santo Domingo; [Second] Legazpi City, Rapu-Rapu, Manito, Camalig, and Daraga; [Third] Ligao City, Guinobatan, Jovellar, Pio Duran, Oas, Polangui, and Libon	Albay
2009-08-04	9694	Establishing a District Engineering Office	Lapu-Lapu City, Mandaue City, Consolacion, and Cordova	Cebu
2009-08-04	9695	Establishing a District Engineering Office	Alicia, Buug, Diplahan, Imelda, Mabuhay, Malangas, Olutanga, Payao, and Talusan	Zamboanga Sibugay
2009-08-04	9696	Establishing a District Engineering Office	Malabon, and Navotas	NCR
2009-08-04	9697	Converting a Sub-District Engineering Office into a District Engineering Office	Alfonso Castañeda, Aritao, Dupax Del Norte, Dupax Del Sur, Kayapa, Kasibu, and Santa Fe	Nueva Vizcaya
2009-08-04	9698	Converting a Sub-District Engineering Office into a District Engineering Office	Bamban, Capas, Concepcion, and La Paz	Tarlac
2009-08-06	9699	Establishing a District Engineering Office	Banna, Carasi, Dingras, Marcos, Nueva Era, Piddig, and Solsona	Ilocos Norte
2009-08-07	9700	Amending the Comprehensive Agrarian Reform Law of 1988 or RA 6657 : Strengthening CARP, Extending the Acquisition and Distribution of Agricultural Lands, and Instituting Reforms		
2009-08-07	9701	Declaring Every October 2 as an Official Nonworking Holiday in the Majayjay Municipality of Laguna in Commemoration of its Foundation	Majayjay	Laguna
2009-08-07	9702	Renaming a Road : Gov. Juan G. Frivaldo Highway	Matnog, and Santa Magdalena	Sorsogon
2009-08-07	9703	Renaming a Road : Pres. Diosdado P. Macapagal National Highway	Banaybanay, Lupon, San Isidro, and Mati City	Davao Oriental
2009-08-07	9704	Renaming a Road : M.T. Villanueva Avenue	Naga City	Camarines Sur
2009-08-07	9705	Renaming a Road : Mayor Manuel T. Sia Diversion Road	Pilar	Sorsogon
2009-08-07	9706	Declaring Every September 29 as a Special Nonworking Holiday in the Balilihan Municipality of Bohol in Commemoration of its Foundation	Balilihan	Bohol
2009-08-08	9707	Telecommunications Franchise : Converge Information and Communications Technology Solutions, Inc.		
2009-08-12	9708	Amending RA 6975 and RA 8551 : Extending for 5 Years the Reglementary Period for Complying with the Educational Qualification for Appointment into the PNP and Adjusting its Promotion System		
2009-08-12	9709	Universal Newborn Hearing Screening and Intervention Act of 2009		
2009-08-14	9710	The Magna Carta of Women		
2009-08-18	9711	Amending the Food, Drug, and Cosmetic Act or RA 3720 : the Food and Drug Administration (FDA) Act of 2009		
2009-08-26	9712	Establishing a National High School : Maronquillo National High School	San Rafael	Bulacan
2009-08-26	9713	Establishing a National High School : Balaong National High School	San Miguel	Bulacan
2009-09-03	9714	Telecommunications Franchise Renewal : Express Telecommunications Co., Inc. (Formerly, Felix Alberto and Company, Incorporated)		
2009-10-09	9715	Converting a Road into National Road : Bagac-Mariveles Road	Bagac, and Mariveles	Bataan
2009-10-12	9716	Reapportioning Legislative Districts of a Province	[First District] Del Gallego, Ragay, Lupi, Sipocot, and Cabusao; [Second District] Libmanan, Minalabac, Pamplona, Pasacao, San Fernando, Gainza, and Milaor; [Third District] Naga City, Pili, Ocampo, Camaligan, Canaman, Magarao, Bombon, and Calabanga	Camarines Sur
2009-10-12	9717	Converting a State College into a State University : Central Bicol State University of Agriculture		Camarines Sur
2009-10-14	9718	Integrating State Colleges into a State University : Naval State University	Naval, and Biliran	Biliran
2009-10-14	9719	Integrating State Colleges into a State University : Northwest Samar State University	Calbayog, and San Jorge	Samar
2009-10-14	9720	Converting a State College into a State University : Ifugao State University	Lamut, Alfonso Lista, Lagawe, Aguinaldo, Hungduan, and Tinoc	Ifugao
2009-10-14	9721	Converting a State College into a State University : Romblon State University	Odiongan, Romblon, Cajidiocan, San Fernando, San Andres, San Agustin, Calatrava, Santa Fe, and Santa Maria	Romblon
2009-10-14	9722	Converting a State College into a State University : Bohol Island State University (BISU)	Tagbilaran City, Balilihan, Bilar, Candijay, Calape, and Clarin	Bohol
2009-10-15	9723	Converting a Municipality into a Component City	Dasmariñas	Cavite
2009-10-20	9724	Creating a Legislative District : Lone District of the City of Iligan	Iligan City	Lanao Del Norte
2009-10-22	9725	Reapportioning Legislative Districts of a Province	[First] Capalonga, Jose Panganiban, Labo, Paracale, and Santa Elena; [Second] Basud, Daet, Mercedes, San Lorenzo Ruiz, San Vicente, Talisay, and Vinzons	Camarines Norte
2009-10-22	9726	Creating a Legislative District : Lone District of the City of Lapu-Lapu	Lapu-Lapu City	Cebu
2009-10-22	9727	Reapportioning Legislative Districts of a Province	[First] Cavite City, Kawit, Noveleta, and Rosario; [Second] Bacoor; [Third] Imus; [Fourth] Dasmariñas; [Fifth] Carmona, General Mariano Alvarez, and Silang; [Sixth] Trece Martires, General Trias, Tanza, and Amadeo; [Seventh] Tagaytay City, Alfonso, General Emilio Aguinaldo, Indang, Magallanes, Maragondon, Mendez, Naic, and Ternate	Cavite
2009-10-23	9728	Freeport Area of Bataan (FAB) Act of 2009	Mariveles	Bataan
2009-10-23	9729	Climate Change Act of 2009 (Read about the Convention)		
2009-10-29	9730	Establishing a National High School : Barugo National High School	Barugo	Leyte
2009-10-29	9731	Establishing a National High School : Banawel National High School	Natonin	Mountain Province
2009-10-29	9732	Establishing a National High School : Dalican National High School	Bontoc	Mountain Province
2009-10-29	9733	Establishing a National High School : Banguitan National High School	Besao	Mountain Province
2009-10-29	9734	Converting a High School Annex into an Independent National High School : Mariano Matugas Memorial National High School	Del Carmen	Surigao Del Norte
2009-10-29	9735	Converting a High School Annex into an Independent National High School : Caridad National High School	Pilar	Surigao Del Norte
2009-10-29	9736	Converting a High School Annex into an Independent National High School : Palitod National High School	Paracelis	Mountain Province
2009-10-29	9737	Converting a High School Annex into an Independent National High School : Leseb National High School	Bauko	Mountain Province
2009-10-29	9738	Converting a High School Annex into an Independent National High School : Am-Am National High School	Tadian	Mountain Province
2009-10-29	9739	Converting a High School Annex into an Independent National High School : Lias National High School	Barlig	Mountain Province
2009-10-30	9740	Converting a Municipality into a Component City	Biñan	Laguna
2009-11-03	9741	Logging Ban Imposition	Silay City, Talisay City, Victorias City, Enrique B. Magalona, and Murcia	Negros Occidental
2009-11-03	9742	Converting a Provincial Road to National Road	Senator Ninoy Aquino, Lebak, and Kalamansig	Sultan Kudarat
2009-11-06	9743	Amending RA 9119 or the Radio and Television Broadcasting Franchise of Benguet Broadcasting Corporation		
2009-11-10	9744	Converting a State College into a State University : Cebu Technological University (CTU)		Cebu
2009-11-10	9745	Anti-Torture Act of 2009 (Read about the Convention)		
2009-11-10	9746	Converting a State College into a State University : University of Antique		Antique
2009-11-10	9747	Renaming an Educational Institution : Occidental Mindoro State College	San Jose	Occidental Mindoro
2009-11-10	9748	Declaring Every June 23 as a Special Nonworking Holiday in the Palawan Province		Palawan
2009-11-10	9749	Declaring Every July 31 as a Special Nonworking Holiday in the Marinduque Province in Commemoration of the Battle of Paye		Marinduque
2009-11-10	9750	Declaring Every September 10 as a Special Nonworking Holiday in San Jose Del Monte City in Commemoration of its Foundation	San Jose Del Monte City	Bulacan
2009-11-10	9751	Converting a Road into National Road : Malinta-Lagta Road	Masbate City, and Baleno	Masbate
2009-11-10	9752	Converting a Road into National Road : Demoloc-Little Baguio-Alabel Road	[Sarangani] Alabel, and [Davao] Malita	Davao Del Sur (Part of Davao Occidental since 2013), and Sarangani
2009-11-10	9753	Converting a High School into a National High School : Congressman Pablo Malasarte National High School	Balilihan	Bohol
2009-11-10	9754	Renaming an Educational Institution : Godofredo M. Tan Memorial School of Arts and Trades	San Narciso	Quezon
2009-11-10	9755	Establishing a National High School : Fortuna National High School	Socorro	Oriental Mindoro
2009-11-10	9756	Establishing a National High School : San Sebastian National High School	San Vicente	Ilocos Sur
2009-11-10	9757	Establishing a National High School : Teofilo R. Macaso Memorial National High School	Jaro	Leyte
2009-11-10	9758	Establishing a National High School : Poctoy National High School	Torrijos	Marinduque
2009-11-10	9759	Converting a High School Annex into an Independent National High School : Del Carmen National High School	Del Carmen	Surigao Del Norte
2009-11-10	9760	Converting a High School Annex into an Independent National High School : Libertad National High School	Santa Monica	Surigao Del Norte
2009-11-10	9761	Converting a High School Annex into an Independent National High School : Nueva Estrella National High School	Socorro	Surigao Del Norte
2009-11-10	9762	Converting a High School Annex into an Independent National High School : Consolacion National High School	Dapa	Surigao Del Norte
2009-11-10	9763	Converting a High School Annex into an Independent National High School : Puangi National High School	Dipaculao	Aurora
2009-11-10	9764	Converting a High School into a National High School : Tagkawayan National High School	Tagkawayan	Quezon
2009-11-10	9765	Converting a High School Annex into an Independent National High School : Belwang National High School	Sadanga	Mountain Province
2009-11-10	9766	Converting a High School Annex into an Independent National High School : Manuel Adriano Memorial National High School	Gloria	Oriental Mindoro
2009-11-10	9767	Converting a High School Annex into an Independent National High School : Cebuano National High School	Tupi	South Cotabato
2009-11-10	9768	Converting a High School Annex into an Independent National High School : Agapito Amado Memorial National High School	Jaro	Leyte
2009-11-10	9769	Converting a High School Annex into an Independent National High School : Aloneros National High School	Guinayangan	Quezon
2009-11-10	9770	Converting a High School Annex into an Independent National High School : President Diosdado Macapagal Memorial National High School	Gloria	Oriental Mindoro
2009-11-10	9771	Converting a High School Annex into an Independent National High School : Bantolinao National High School	Antequera	Bohol
2009-11-13	9772	Logging Ban Imposition		Southern Leyte
2009-11-14	9773	Radio and Television Broadcasting Franchise : Philippine Collectivemedia Corporation		Biliran, Eastern Samar, Leyte, Northern Samar, Samar, and Southern Leyte
2009-11-17	9774	Reapportioning Legislative Districts of a Province	[First] Baroy, Tubod, Kolambugan, Maigo, Bacolod, Kauswagan, Linamon, Tagoloan, Balo-i, Matungao, and Pantar; [Second] Pantao Ragat, Poona Piagapo, Munai, Tangcal, Magsaysay, Salvador, Lala, Sultan Naga Dimaporo, Kapatagan, Sapad, and Nunungan	Lanao Del Norte
2009-11-17	9775	Anti-Child Pornography Act of 2009 (Read about the Convention and its Optional Protocol)		
2009-11-17	9776	Declaring Every August 10 as a Special Nonworking Holiday in San Jose City in Commemoration of its Cityhood	San Jose City	Nueva Ecija
2009-11-17	9777	Declaring Every October 12 as a Special Nonworking Holiday in Getafe Municipality to Commemorate its Foundation	Getafe	Bohol
2009-11-17	9778	Declaring Every January 12 as a Special Nonworking Holiday in Talisay City in Commemoration of its Foundation	Talisay City	Cebu
2009-11-18	9779	Changing the Name of a National High School : Dupax Del Norte National High School	Dupax Del Norte	Nueva Vizcaya
2009-11-18	9780	Establishing a National High School : Dibacong National High School	Casiguran	Aurora
2009-11-18	9781	Establishing a National High School : Gibacungan National High School	Tabango	Leyte
2009-11-18	9782	Converting a High School Annex into an Independent National High School : Daniel Z. Romualdez State Comprehensive School of Fisheries	Tolosa	Leyte
2009-11-18	9783	Converting a High School Annex into an Independent National High School : Runruno National High School	Quezon	Nueva Vizcaya
2009-11-18	9784	Establishing a National High School : Sisim National High School	Cabugao	Ilocos Sur
2009-11-18	9785	Converting a High School Annex into an Independent National High School : Anticala National High School	Butuan	Agusan del Norte
2009-11-18	9786	Converting a High School Annex into an Independent National High School : Florida National High School	Butuan	Agusan del Norte
2009-11-18	9787	Converting a High School Annex into an Independent National High School : San Rafael National High School	Paracelis	Mountain Province
2009-11-18	9788	Converting a High School Annex into an Independent National High School : Bansa National High School	Bauko	Mountain Province
2009-11-18	9789	Converting a High School Annex into an Independent National High School : Saliok National High School	Natonin	Mountain Province
2009-11-18	9790	Culion Sanitarium Conversion and Upgrading Act of 2009	Culion	Palawan
2009-11-19	9791	Converting a Regional Hospital into a Medical Center : Batangas Medical Center (Amending RA 7532)	Batangas City	Batangas
2009-11-19	9792	Changing the Name of a Medical Institution : Southern Philippines Medical Center with Increased Bed Capacity and Medical Personnel, and Upgrade of Services, Facilities and Professional Health Care	Davao City	Davao Del Sur
2009-11-19	9793	Increasing Bed Capacity of a Hospital : Eastern Visayas Regional Medical Center with an Upgrade of Services, Facilities and Professional Health Care, and Increased Medical Personnel	Tacloban City	Leyte
2009-11-19	9794	Converting a Provincial Road to National Road	Baguio City, and La Trinidad	Benguet
2009-11-19	9795	Converting a Road into National Road : Iloilo-Leganes-Dumangas Coastal Road	Iloilo City, Dumangas, and Leganes	Iloilo
2009-11-19	9796	Converting a Road into National Road : A Portion of the Kawit-Noveleta Diversion Road	INFO NEEDED	Cavite
2009-11-19	9797	Converting a Provincial Road to National Road : Rizal-San Jose City Road	San Jose City, and Rizal	Nueva Ecija
2009-11-20	9798	Renaming an Educational Institution : Pangasinan Technological Institute (PTI)	Binmaley	Pangasinan
2009-11-20	9799	Converting a Provincial Road to National Road : Tungkong Mangga-Muzon National Road	San Jose Del Monte City	Bulacan
2009-11-20	9800	Converting a Provincial Road to National Road : Bongabong-Sagana-Roxas-San Aquilino Road	Bongabong, and Roxas	Oriental Mindoro
2009-11-20	9801	Converting a Provincial Road to National Road : Mauban-Tignoan Road	Mauban, and Real	Quezon
2009-11-20	9802	Converting a Road into National Road : Silay-Lantawan Road	Silay City	Negros Occidental
2009-11-25	9803	Food Donation Act of 2009 (Read about the Convention)		
2009-11-26	9804	Converting a High School into a National High School : Fermin Tayabas National High School	Calape	Bohol
2009-11-26	9805	Converting a High School into a National High School : Fatima National High School	Cortes	Bohol
2009-11-26	9806	Converting a High School into a National High School : Baclayon National High School	Baclayon	Bohol
2009-11-26	9807	Converting a High School Annex into an Independent National High School : Ned National High School	Lake Sebu	South Cotabato
2009-11-26	9808	Converting a High School Annex into an Independent National High School : New Dumangas National High School	T'boli	South Cotabato
2009-11-26	9809	Converting a High School Annex into an Independent National High School : Mansasa National High School	Tagbilaran City	Bohol
2009-11-26	9810	Converting a High School Annex into an Independent National High School : Calape National High School	Calape	Bohol
2009-11-26	9811	Converting a High School Annex into an Independent National High School : Tipunan National High School	Bauko	Mountain Province
2009-11-26	9812	Converting a High School Annex into an Independent National High School : Pamosaingan National High School	Socorro	Surigao Del Norte
2009-11-26	9813	Converting a High School Annex into an Independent National High School : Lambontong National High School	Surallah	South Cotabato
2009-11-26	9814	Converting a High School Annex into an Independent National High School : Bayanihan National High School	Maria Aurora	Aurora
2009-11-26	9815	Converting a High School Annex into an Independent National High School : Borlongan National High School	Dipaculao	Aurora
2009-11-26	9816	Converting a High School Annex into an Independent National High School : Tapapan National High School	Bauko	Mountain Province
2009-11-26	9817	Converting a High School Annex into an Independent National High School : Tucucan National High School	Bontoc	Mountain Province
2009-11-26	9818	Converting a High School Annex into an Independent National High School : Bucay Pait National High School	Tantangan	South Cotabato
2009-11-26	9819	Establishing an Annex to a National High School : Makinhas National High School Annex	Baybay City	Leyte
2009-11-26	9820	Establishing an Annex to a National High School : San Isidro National High School Annex	Mahaplag	Leyte
2009-11-26	9821	Converting a High School Annex into an Independent National High School : Bonfal National High School	Bayombong	Nueva Vizcaya
2009-11-26	9822	Converting a High School Annex into an Independent National High School : Paima National High School	Bayombong	Nueva Vizcaya
2009-11-26	9823	Converting a High School Annex into an Independent National High School : Casecnan National High School	Alfonso Castañeda	Nueva Vizcaya
2009-11-26	9824	Converting an Integrated School into a National High School : Makiwalo National High School	Mondragon	Northern Samar
2009-11-26	9825	Converting a High School Annex into an Independent National High School : Veriato National High School	San Isidro	Northern Samar
2009-11-26	9826	Establishing a National High School : Bacongco National High School	Koronadal City	South Cotabato
2009-11-26	9827	Converting a High School Annex into an Independent National High School : Martinez Cuyangan National High School	Kayapa	Nueva Vizcaya
2009-12-03	9828	Creating the Military Service Board		
2009-12-03	9829	Pre-Need Code of the Philippines		
2009-12-03	9830	Converting a High School Annex into an Independent National High School : Jesus J. Soriano National High School	Davao City	Davao Del Sur
2009-12-03	9831	Converting a High School Annex into an Independent National High School : Governor Vicente Duterte National High School	Davao City	Davao Del Sur
2009-12-09	9832	Converting a State College into a State University : Don Honorio Ventura Technological State University (DHVTSU)		Pampanga
2009-12-10	9833	Converting a High School into a National High School : Sandingan National High School	Loon	Bohol
2009-12-10	9834	Converting a High School into a National High School : Cawayanan National High School	Tubigon	Bohol
2009-12-10	9835	Establishing a National High School : Malacampa National High School	Camiling	Tarlac
2009-12-10	9836	Converting a High School into a National High School : Bantugan National High School	Presentacion	Camarines Sur
2009-12-10	9837	Converting a High School into a National High School : Panagan National High School	Lagonoy	Camarines Sur
2009-12-10	9838	Converting a High School into a National High School : Tinawagan National High School	Tigaon	Camarines Sur
2009-12-10	9839	Converting a High School into a National High School : Mantacida National High School	Catigbian	Bohol
2009-12-10	9840	Converting a High School into a National High School : Loon South National High School	Loon	Bohol
2009-12-10	9841	Converting a High School Annex into an Independent National High School : Ampucao National High School	Itogon	Benguet
2009-12-10	9842	Converting a High School Annex into an Independent National High School : Loo National High School	Buguias	Benguet
2009-12-10	9843	Converting a High School Annex into an Independent National High School : Pinsao National High School	Baguio City	Benguet
2009-12-10	9844	Converting a High School Annex into an Independent National High School : Caba National High School	Lagawe	Ifugao
2009-12-10	9845	Converting a High School Annex into an Independent National High School : Tulaed National High School	Mayoyao	Ifugao
2009-12-10	9846	Converting a High School into a National High School : San Isidro National High School	Tagbilaran City	Bohol
2009-12-11	9847	Establishing a Protected Area : Mountains Banahaw and San Cristobal Protected Landscape (MBSCPL) Act of 2009	[Laguna] Majayjay, Nagcarlan, Liliw, Rizal, and San Pablo; [Quezon] Dolores, Candelaria, Sariaya, Lucban, and Tayabas	Laguna, and Quezon
2009-12-11	9848	Creating additional Branches of the Regional Trial Court and the Metropolitan Trial Court	Mandaluyong	NCR
2009-12-11	9849	Amending the Administrative Code of 1987 or EO 292 : the Observation of Eidul Adha on Every 10th Day of Zhul Hijja as a National Holiday		
2009-12-11	9850	Declaring Arnis as the National Martial Art and Sport		
2009-12-11	9851	Philippine Act on Crimes Against International Humanitarian Law, Genocide, and Other Crimes against Humanity (Read about the Geneva Conventions, the Hague Convention, the Genocide Convention, and the Convention against Torture)		
2009-12-15	9852	Integrating State Colleges into a State University : Jose Rizal Memorial State University (JRMSU)		Zamboanga Del Norte
2009-12-15	9853	Amending the Customs Brokers Act of 2004 or RA 9280 : Inclusion of Primary Parties in Customs Declaration		
2009-12-16	9854	Integrating State Colleges into a State University : Caraga State University	Butuan and Cabadbaran	Agusan del Norte
2009-12-16	9855	Converting a High School into a National High School : Magsaysay National High School	Tinambac	Camarines Sur
2009-12-17	9856	The Real Estate Investment Trust (REIT) Act of 2009		
2009-12-20	9857	Telecommunications Franchise : Schutzengel Telecom, Inc.		
2009-12-20	9858	Amending the Family Code of the Philippines or EO 209 : Legitimation of Children Born to Parents Below Marrying age		
2009-12-20	9859	Amending RA 6769 : Adjusting/Correcting Territorial Boundaries of the San Jose Municipality	San Jose, and Dinagat	Dinagat Islands
2009-12-20	9860	Integrating an Extension Campus as a Regular Branch of Bicol University	Gubat	Sorsogon
2009-12-20	9861	Establishing a National High School : Agay-Ayan National High School	Tinambac	Camarines Sur
2009-12-20	9862	Establishing a National High School : Pasian National High School	Monkayo	Compostela Valley
2009-12-20	9863	Establishing a National High School : Danggo National High School	Tinoc	Ifugao
2009-12-20	9864	Establishing a National High School : La Trinidad National High School	La Trinidad	Benguet
2009-12-20	9865	Converting a High School Annex into an Independent National High School : Magsaysay National High School	Baguio City	Benguet
2009-12-20	9866	Converting a National High School into a National Vocational High School : Ayangan National Agricultural and Vocational High School	Lagawe	Ifugao
2009-12-20	9867	Converting a High School Annex into an Independent National High School : Southern Hingyon National High School	Hingyon	Ifugao
2009-12-20	9868	Converting a High School into a National High School : Datu Lipus Makapandong National High School	Rosario	Agusan Del Sur
2009-12-20	9869	Converting a High School Annex into an Independent National High School : Roxas National High School	Baguio City	Benguet
2009-12-20	9870	Converting a High School Annex into an Independent National High School : Taloy Sur National High School	Tuba	Benguet
2009-12-31	9871	Converting a High School Annex into an Independent National High School : Adaoay National High School	Kabayan	Benguet
2009-12-31	9872	Establishing a Science High School : Biliran Science High School	Biliran	Biliran
2009-12-31	9873	Converting a High School Annex into an Independent National High School : Camandag National High School	Asipulo	Ifugao
2009-12-31	9874	Converting a High School into a National High School : Nato National High School	Sagñay	Camarines Sur
2009-12-31	9875	Converting a High School into a National High School : Bitaogan National High School	Presentacion	Camarines Sur
2009-12-31	9876	Converting a High School Annex into an Independent National High School : Catlubong National High School	Buguias	Benguet
2009-12-31	9877	Converting a High School Annex into an Independent National High School : Laureta National High School	Tagum City	Davao Del Norte
2009-12-31	9878	Converting a High School Annex into an Independent National High School : Kidawa National High School	Laak	Compostela Valley
2009-12-31	9879	Converting a High School Annex into an Independent National High School : Tuboran National High School	Mawab	Compostela Valley
2009-12-31	9880	Converting a High School Annex into an Independent National High School : Kao National High School	Nabunturan	Compostela Valley
2009-12-31	9881	Converting a High School Annex into an Independent National High School : Mil-an National High School	Baguio City	Benguet
2009-12-31	9882	Converting a High School Annex into an Independent National High School : Balungisan National High School	Payao	Zamboanga Sibugay
2009-12-31	9883	Converting a High School Annex into an Independent National High School : Kalanguya National High School	Tinoc	Ifugao
2009-12-31	9884	Converting a High School Annex into an Independent National High School : Caragasan National High School	Alfonso Lista	Ifugao
2009-12-31	9885	Converting a High School Annex into an Independent National High School : New Albay National High School	Maragusan	Compostela Valley
2009-12-31	9886	Converting a High School Annex into an Independent National High School : Nuevo Iloco National High School	Mawab	Compostela Valley
2009-12-31	9887	Converting a High School Annex into an Independent National High School : Bolhoon National High School	San Miguel	Surigao Del Sur
2009-12-31	9888	Converting a High School Annex into an Independent National High School : Mainit National High School	Maco	Compostela Valley
2009-12-31	9889	Converting a High School Annex into an Independent National High School : Mayaon National High School	Montevista	Compostela Valley
2009-12-31	9890	Establishing a National High School : Canayonan National High School	Tinambac	Camarines Sur
2009-12-31	9891	Converting a High School Annex into an Independent National High School : New Leyte National High School	Maco	Compostela Valley
2009-12-31	9892	Converting a High School Annex into an Independent National High School : Tigao National High School	Cortes	Surigao Del Sur
2009-12-31	9893	Converting a High School Annex into an Independent National High School : Joaquin Smith National High School	Baguio City	Benguet
2009-12-31	9894	Establishing a National High School : Catalotoan National High School	Sagñay	Camarines Sur
2009-12-31	9895	Converting a High School Annex into an Independent National High School : Sibulan National High School	Santa Cruz	Davao Del Sur
2009-12-31	9896	Converting a High School Annex into an Independent National High School : Mangayon National High School	Compostela	Compostela Valley
2009-12-31	9897	Converting a High School into a National High School : Aguinaldo National High School	Aguinaldo	Ifugao
2009-12-31	9898	Converting a High School into a National High School : San Vicente National High School	Prosperidad	Agusan Del Sur
2009-12-31	9899	Converting a High School Annex into an Independent National High School : Tubalan Comprehensive National High School	Malita	Davao Del Sur (Part of Davao Occidental since 2013)
2009-12-31	9900	Converting a High School Annex into an Independent National High School : Bangao National High School	Buguias	Benguet
2009-12-31	9901	Converting a High School Annex into an Independent National High School : Tawangan-Lusod National High School	Kabayan	Benguet
2009-12-31	9902	Converting a High School Annex into an Independent National High School : Bulalacao National High School	Mankayan	Benguet
2010-01-07	9903	Social Security Condonation Law of 2009		
2010-01-07	9904	Magna Carta for Homeowners and Homeowners' Associations		
2010-01-07	9905	Creating a Barangay : Banawa-Englis (Rejected by Plebiscite)	Cebu City	Cebu
2010-01-07	9906	Creating additional Branches of the Regional Trial Court	Koronadal City, and Surallah	South Cotabato
2010-01-07	9907	Establishing a National Science High School : Baguio City National Science High School	Baguio City	Benguet
2010-01-07	9908	Converting a High School Annex into an Independent National High School : Mongilit Ligmayo National High School	Lamut	Ifugao
2010-01-07	9909	Converting a High School Annex into an Independent National High School : Mabuhay National High School	Mabuhay	Zamboanga Sibugay
2010-01-07	9910	Converting a High School Annex into an Independent National High School : Eastern Kalinga National High School	Tabuk City	Kalinga
2010-01-07	9911	Converting a High School Annex into an Independent National High School : Nambucayan National High School	Tabuk City	Kalinga
2010-01-07	9912	Converting a High School Annex into an Independent National High School : Langgawisan National High School	Maragusan	Compostela Valley
2010-01-07	9913	Converting a High School Annex into an Independent National High School : La Libertad National High School	Santo Tomas	Davao Del Norte
2010-01-07	9914	Converting a High School Annex into an Independent National High School : Nieves Villarica National High School	Samal City	Davao Del Norte
2010-01-07	9915	Converting a High School Annex into an Independent National High School : Balili National High School	Mankayan	Benguet
2010-01-07	9916	Converting a High School Annex into an Independent National High School : Tacadang National High School	Kibungan	Benguet
2010-01-07	9917	Converting a High School Annex into an Independent National High School : Macutay-Palao National High School	Rizal	Kalinga
2010-01-07	9918	Converting a High School Annex into an Independent National High School : Guisad Valley National High School	Baguio City	Benguet
2010-01-07	9919	Converting a High School Annex into an Independent National High School : Marc Ysrael B. Bernos Memorial National High School	La Paz	Abra
2010-01-07	9920	Converting a High School Annex into an Independent National High School : Ticulon National High School	Malita	Davao Del Sur (Part of Davao Occidental since 2013)
2010-01-07	9921	Converting a National High School into a National Science High School : RPMD National Science High School	Marawi City	Lanao Del Sur
2010-01-07	9922	Separating Secondary Programs of a School into an Independent National High School : Buenavista National High School	Buena Vista	Agusan Del Norte
2010-01-07	9923	Converting a Barangay High School into a National High School : Danao National High School	Jasaan	Misamis Oriental
2010-01-07	9924	Establishing a National High School : Argao National High School	Argao	Cebu
2010-01-07	9925	Establishing a National High School : Panlaitan National High School	Busuanga	Palawan
2010-01-07	9926	Converting a High School Annex into an Independent National High School : San Jose National High School	Banga	South Cotabato
2010-01-07	9927	Converting a High School Annex into an Independent National High School : Tambaliza National High School	Concepcion	Iloilo
2010-01-07	9928	Establishing a National High School : Pantaleon Cudiera Memorial National High School	Olutanga	Zamboanga Sibugay
2010-01-07	9929	Establishing a National High School : Kitubo National High School	Kitaotao	Bukidnon
2010-01-07	9930	Establishing a National High School : Macasandig National High School	Cagayan de Oro	Misamis Oriental
2010-01-07	9931	Establishing a National High School : Camanga National High School	Siay	Zamboanga Sibugay
2010-01-07	9932	Establishing a National High School : General Emilio Aguinaldo National High School	Ramon	Isabela
2010-01-07	9933	Establishing a National High School : Macapari National High School	Damulog	Bukidnon
2010-01-07	9934	Establishing a National High School : Dologon National High School	Maramag	Bukidnon
2010-01-07	9935	Converting a High School Annex into an Independent National High School : Keytodac National High School	Lebak	Sultan Kudarat
2010-01-07	9936	Converting a High School Annex into an Independent National High School : Lupon National Comprehensive High School	Lupon	Davao Oriental
2010-01-07	9937	Converting a High School Annex into an Independent National High School : Sangay National High School	Kalamansig	Sultan Kudarat
2010-01-07	9938	Converting a High School Annex into an Independent National High School : Magnaga National High School	Pantukan	Compostela Valley
2010-01-07	9939	Converting a High School Annex into an Independent National High School : Ramonito P. Maravilla Sr. National High School	Bacolod City	Negros Occidental
2010-01-07	9940	Converting a High School Annex into an Independent National High School : Adriano Cabardo National High School	Alimodian	Iloilo
2010-01-07	9941	Converting a High School Annex into an Independent National High School : Barangay Estado National High School	Victorias City	Negros Occidental
2010-01-07	9942	Converting a High School Annex into an Independent National High School : Puerto National High School	Cagayan de Oro	Misamis Oriental
2010-01-07	9943	Converting a High School Annex into an Independent National High School : Bugo National High School	Cagayan de Oro	Misamis Oriental
2010-01-07	9944	Establishing a National High School : Concepcion National High School	Agutaya	Palawan
2010-01-07	9945	Establishing a National High School : Calandagan National High School	Araceli	Palawan
2010-01-13	9946	Amending RA 910 : Granting Additional Benefits to Members of the Judiciary		
2010-01-15	9947	Establishing a National High School : Malagandis National High School	Titay	Zamboanga Sibugay
2010-01-15	9948	Establishing a National High School : Guintoloan National High School	Naga	Zamboanga Sibugay
2010-01-15	9949	Establishing a National High School : Efegenio Lizares National High School	Talisay City	Negros Occidental
2010-01-15	9950	Establishing a National High School : Tablon National High School	Cagayan de Oro	Misamis Oriental
2010-01-15	9951	Establishing a National High School : Ilog National High School	Ilog	Negros Occidental
2010-01-15	9952	Establishing a National High School : Vicente L. Pimentel, Sr. National High School	Tandag	Surigao Del Sur
2010-01-15	9953	Establishing a National High School : Quezon National High School	Quezon	Bukidnon
2010-01-15	9954	Establishing a National High School : Tario Lim National Memorial High School	Tibiao	Antique
2010-01-15	9955	Establishing a National High School : Macasing National High School	Pagadian City	Zamboanga Del Sur
2010-01-15	9956	Establishing a National High School : Lintugop National High School	Aurora	Zamboanga Del Sur
2010-01-15	9957	Establishing a National High School : Matalang National High School	Midsalip	Zamboanga Del Sur
2010-01-15	9958	Converting a High School Annex into an Independent National High School : Panikian National High School	Carrascal	Surigao Del Sur
2010-01-15	9959	Converting a High School Annex into an Independent National High School : Sisay National High School	Tungawan	Zamboanga Sibugay
2010-01-15	9960	Converting a High School Annex into an Independent National High School : Tagugpo National High School	Pantukan	Compostela Valley
2010-01-15	9961	Converting a High School Annex into an Independent National High School : Melale National High School	Laak	Compostela Valley
2010-01-15	9962	Converting a High School Annex into an Independent National High School : Pindasan National High School	Mabini	Compostela Valley
2010-01-15	9963	Establishing a National High School : Governor Evelio B. Javier Memorial National High School	San Remigio	Antique
2010-01-15	9964	Converting a High School Annex into an Independent National High School : Sibalom National High School	Sibalom	Antique
2010-01-15	9965	Renaming a Road : Francisco S. Dizon Road	Davao City	Davao del Sur
2010-01-18	9966	Converting a State College into a State University : Sultan Kudarat State University (SKSU)	Tacurong City, Lutayan, Kalamansig, Palimbang, and Isulan	Sultan Kudarat
2010-02-06	9967	Electric Power Distribution Franchise : San Fernando Electric Light and Power Company, Inc	San Fernando City, Floridablanca, and parts of Guagua	Pampanga
2010-02-06	9968	Electric Power Distribution Franchise : Cabanatuan Electric Corporation (Formerly, Samahang Magsasaka, Incorporada)	Cabanatuan	Nueva Ecija
2010-02-06	9969	Electric Power Distribution Franchise : Dagupan Electric Corporation	Dagupan, Calasiao, Santa Barbara, San Fabian, San Jacinto, Manaoag, and a portion of San Carlos City	Pangasinan
2010-02-08	9970	Appropriations Act of 2010		
2010-02-10	9971	Establishing a National High School : Mayo National High School	Mati City	Davao Oriental
2010-02-10	9972	Establishing a National High School : Lavigan National High School	Governor Generoso	Davao Oriental
2010-02-10	9973	Establishing a National High School : Badas National High School	Mati City	Davao Oriental
2010-02-10	9974	Establishing a National High School : Cantilan National High School	Cantilan	Surigao Del Sur
2010-02-10	9975	Establishing a National High School : Don Carlos National High School	Don Carlos	Bukidnon
2010-02-10	9976	Converting a High School Annex into an Independent National High School : Ulip National High School	Monkayo	Compostela Valley
2010-02-10	9977	Converting a High School Annex into an Independent National High School : Awao National High School	Monkayo	Compostela Valley
2010-02-10	9978	Converting a High School Annex into an Independent National High School : Don Salvador Lopez National High School	Mati City	Davao Oriental
2010-02-10	9979	Converting a High School Annex into an Independent National High School : Bulawan National High School	Payao	Zamboanga Sibugay
2010-02-10	9980	Converting a High School Annex into an Independent National High School : Kawayan National High School	Alicia	Zamboanga Sibugay
2010-02-10	9981	Converting a High School Annex into an Independent National High School : Balubal National High School	Cagayan de Oro	Misamis Oriental
2010-02-10	9982	Converting a High School Annex into an Independent National High School : San Isidro National High School	Tungawan	Zamboanga Sibugay
2010-02-10	9983	Converting a High School into a National High School : Buenavista National High School	Presentacion	Camarines Sur
2010-02-10	9984	Converting a High School Annex into an Independent National High School : San Jose National High School	Bislig	Surigao Del Sur
2010-02-10	9985	Converting a High School Annex into an Independent National High School : Mone National High School	Bislig	Surigao Del Sur
2010-02-10	9986	Converting a High School Annex into an Independent National High School : Fishing Village Comprehensive National High School	Malita	Davao Del Sur (Part of Davao Occidental since 2013)
2010-02-10	9987	Converting a High School into a National High School : La Fortuna National High School	Veruela	Agusan Del Sur
2010-02-10	9988	Converting a High School Annex into an Independent National High School : Santa Maria National High School	Trento	Agusan Del Sur
2010-02-10	9989	Separating Secondary Programs of a School into an Independent National High School : Cawayan National High School	Catarman	Northern Samar
2010-02-10	9990	Converting a Barangay High School into a National High School : Naawan National High School	Naawan	Misamis Oriental
2010-02-10	9991	Converting a High School Annex into an Independent National High School : Baluan National High School	Palimbang	Sultan Kudarat
2010-02-10	9992	Converting a Road into National Road : Antequera-San Isidro-Libertad (Tubigon) Road	Antequera, San Isidro, and Tubigon	Bohol
2010-02-12	9993	Philippine Coast Guard Law of 2009 : Repealing RA 5173		
2010-02-15	9994	Amending RA 7432 : Expanded Senior Citizens Act of 2010		
2010-02-15	9995	Anti-Photo and Video Voyeurism Act of 2009		
2010-02-17	9996	Mindanao Development Authority (MinDA) Act of 2010		
2010-02-18	9997	National Commission on Muslim Filipinos Act of 2009		
2010-02-22	9998	Converting a State College into a State University : Surigao del Sur State University	Tandag, Cantilan, Lianga, Tagbina, San Miguel, and Cagwait	Surigao Del Sur
2010-02-23	9999	Free Legal Assistance Act of 2010		
2010-02-23	10000	Agri-Agra Reform Credit Act of 2009		
2010-02-23	10001	Amending the National Internal Revenue Code of 1997 or RA 8424 : Reducing Taxes on Life Insurance Policies		
2010-02-23	10002	Establishing a National High School : Nasipit National High School	Nasipit	Agusan Del Norte
2010-02-23	10003	Establishing a National High School : Cabadbaran City National High School	Cabadbaran	Agusan del Norte
2010-02-23	10004	Establishing a National High School : Western Biliran High School for the Arts and Culture	Almeria	Biliran
2010-02-23	10005	Establishing a National High School : Information and Communications Technology (ICT) High School of Eastern Biliran	Caibiran	Biliran
2010-02-23	10006	Establishing a National High School : Saluyong National High School	Manukan	Zamboanga Del Norte
2010-02-23	10007	Converting a High School Annex into an Independent National High School : Bato National High School	Santa Cruz	Davao del Sur
2010-02-23	10008	Converting a High School Annex into an Independent National High School : Mangilay National High School	Siayan	Zamboanga Del Norte
2010-02-23	10009	Converting a High School Annex into an Independent National High School : Nonito Paz Arroyo Memorial National High School	Baao	Camarines Sur
2010-02-23	10010	Converting a High School into a National High School : Bato National High School	Bato	Camarines Sur
2010-02-23	10011	Converting a Road into National Road : Bacon-Sawanga-Prieto Diaz Road	Sorsogon City, and Prieto Diaz	Sorsogon
2010-02-23	10012	Converting a Road into National Road : Eastern Bobongan-Sominot-Midsalip-Dumingag National Road	Ramon Magsaysay, Sominot, Midsalip, and Dumingag	Zamboanga Del Sur
2010-02-23	10013	Converting a Road into National Road : Ubao-Taang National Road	Aguinaldo	Ifugao
2010-02-23	10014	Converting a Road into National Road : Capas-San Jose-Mayantoc-Malacampa Road	Capas, San Jose, Mayantoc, and Camiling	Tarlac
2010-02-23	10015	Converting a Road into National Road : Mabinay-Ayungon National Road	INFO NEEDED	Negros Oriental
2010-02-23	10016	Converting a Road into National Road : Sindangan-Bayog-Lakewood Road	INFO NEEDED	Zamboanga Del Norte, and Zamboanga Del Sur
2010-02-23	10017	Converting a Road into National Road : Bonifacio-Don Victoriano Road	Bonifacio, and Don Victoriano	Misamis Occidental
2010-02-23	10018	Converting a Road into National Road : Maripipi Island Circumferential Road	Maripipi	Biliran
2010-02-23	10019	Converting a Road into National Road	INFO NEEDED	Zamboanga Del Norte, and Zamboanga Sibugay
2010-02-23	10020	Establishing a National High School : Maac National High School	Guinsiliban	Camiguin
2010-03-08	10021	Amending the National Internal Revenue Code of 1997 or RA 8424 - Exchange of Information on Tax Matters Act of 2009		
2010-03-08	10022	Amending the Migrant Workers and Overseas Filipinos Act of 1995 or RA 8042 : Improving Standard of Protection and Welfare to Migrant Workers, Overseas Filipino Workers, and their Families (Read about the International labour law)		
2010-03-09	10023	Issuance of Free Patents to Residential Lands		
2010-03-09	10024	Philippine Respiratory Therapy Act of 2009		
2010-03-11	10025	Converting an Elementary School into an Integrated School : Ilaya Barangka Integrated School		
2010-03-11	10026	Amending the National Internal Revenue Code of 1997 or RA 8424 : Granting Tax Exemption to Local Water Districts		
2010-03-13	10027	Radio, Television, and Satellite Broadcasting Franchise : Aurora Technological Institute, Inc		
2010-03-16	10028	Amending the Rooming-in and Breastfeeding Act of 1992 or RA 7600 : Expanded Breastfeeding Promotion Act of 2009		
2010-03-16	10029	Philippine Psychology Act of 2009		
2010-03-16	10030	Converting a Road into National Road : Bakong-Tubig Indangan-Tonggusong-Tampakan Road	Simunul	Tawi-Tawi
2010-03-18	10031	Establishing a National High School : Cantubod National High School	Danao	Bohol
2010-03-18	10032	Establishing a National High School : Diwat National High School	Bonifacio	Misamis Occidental
2010-03-18	10033	Establishing a National High School : Don Ynocencio A. Del Rosario National High School	Roxas City	Capiz
2010-03-18	10034	Converting a National High School into a National Science High School : Ubay National Science High School	Ubay	Bohol
2010-03-18	10035	Converting a High School into a National High School : Hinawanan National High School	Loay	Bohol
2010-03-18	10036	Converting a High School into a National High School : Bayawahan National High School	Sevilla	Bohol
2010-03-18	10037	Converting a High School Annex into an Independent National High School : Francisco Dagohoy Memorial High School	Danao	Bohol
2010-03-18	10038	Establishing a National High School : Don Filomeno M. Torres Memorial National High School	Pilar	Cebu
2010-03-18	10039	Establishing a National High School : Ubaldo Iway Memorial National High School	Danao	Cebu
2010-03-18	10040	Converting a Road into National Road : Balilihan-Hanopol-Batuan National Road	Balilihan, and Batuan	Bohol
2010-03-18	10041	Converting a Road into National Road : Leganes-Santa Barbara National Road	Leganes, and Santa Barbara	Iloilo
2010-03-18	10042	Converting a Road into National Road : Dapa-Union-General Luna Road	Dapa, and General Luna	Surigao Del Norte
2010-03-18	10043	Establishing a Health Institute Integrated with a Hospital	Sibutu	Tawi-Tawi
2010-03-19	10044	Establishing a National High School : Kinuman Norte National High School	Ozamiz City	Misamis Occidental
2010-03-19	10045	Establishing a National High School : Gala National High School	Ozamiz City	Misamis Occidental
2010-03-19	10046	Establishing a National High School : Taming National High School	Danao	Bohol
2010-03-19	10047	Establishing a National High School : Tabid National High School	Ozamiz City	Misamis Occidental
2010-03-19	10048	Establishing a National High School : Upper Usugan National Comprehensive High School	Bonifacio	Misamis Occidental
2010-03-19	10049	Converting a High School Annex into an Independent National High School : San Miguel National High School	Compostela	Compostela Valley
2010-03-19	10050	Renaming a Bridge : President Diosdado P. Macapagal Bridge		Southern Leyte
2010-03-19	10051	Naming a New Bridge : Pres. Diosdado P. Macapagal Bridge	Butuan	Agusan del Norte
2010-03-19	10052	Renaming a Road : Mayor Ramon T. Pastor Sr. Street	Dumaguete	Negros Oriental
2010-03-19	10053	Renaming a Road : Labanan sa Binakayan Road	Kawit	Cavite
2010-03-23	10054	Motorcycle Helmet Act of 2009		
2010-03-23	10055	Philippine Technology Transfer Act of 2009		
2010-03-24	10056	Establishing a National High School : Calabayan National High School	Ozamiz City	Misamis Occidental
2010-03-24	10057	Establishing a National High School : Sikatuna National Agricultural High School	Talibon	Bohol
2010-03-24	10058	Establishing a National High School : Lubang National High School	Buenavista	Bohol
2010-03-24	10059	Establishing a National High School : Tenani Integrated National High School	Paranas	Samar
2010-03-24	10060	Converting a High School into a National High School : Anoling National High School	Candijay	Bohol
2010-03-24	10061	Establishing a High School Annex : Hampipila National High School Annex	Abuyog	Leyte
2010-03-24	10062	Converting a High School into a National High School : Cogtong National High School	Candijay	Bohol
2010-03-24	10063	Converting a High School into a National High School : Oy National High School	Loboc	Bohol
2010-03-24	10064	Converting a High School Annex into an Independent National High School : Sun Valley National High School	Parañaque City	NCR
2010-03-24	10065	Converting a High School Annex into an Independent National High School : Moonwalk National High School	Parañaque City	NCR
2010-03-26	10066	National Cultural Heritage Act of 2009		
2010-04-06	10067	Tubbataha Reefs Natural Park Act of 2009		Palawan
2010-04-06	10068	Organic Agriculture Act of 2010		
2010-04-06	10069	Declaring Every May 7 as Health Workers' Day		
2010-04-06	10070	Amending the Magna Carta For Disabled Persons or RA 7277 : Institutionalizing a Mechanism to Implement the Magna Carta Nationwide		
2010-04-08	10071	Prosecution Service Act of 2010		
2010-04-20	10072	Philippine Red Cross Act of 2009		
2010-04-20	10073	Girl Scouts of the Philippines Charter of 2009		
2010-04-20	10074	Converting an Extension Office into a Regular Office (LTO)	Calamba	Laguna
2010-04-20	10075	Converting a Road into National Road : Asuncion-San Isidro-Laak-Veruela Road	[Davao] Asuncion, and San Isidro; [Compostela] Laak; [Agusan] Veruela	Agusan Del Sur, Compostela Valley, and Davao Del Norte
2010-04-20	10076	Converting a Road into National Road : Balo-i-Matungao-Linamon Road	Balo-i, Matungao, and Linamon	Lanao Del Norte
2010-04-20	10077	Converting a Road into National Road : Mabinay-Bayawan Road	Bayawan City, and Mabinay	Negros Oriental
2010-04-20	10078	Converting a Road into National Road : Bato Bato-Lapid Lapid Road	Panglima Sugala, and Bongao	Tawi-Tawi
2010-04-20	10079	Converting a Road into National Road : Gil Fernando Avenue	Marikina	NCR
2010-04-20	10080	Converting a High School Annex into an Independent National High School : Langcataon National High School	Pangantucan	Bukidnon
2010-04-20	10081	Converting a High School Annex into an Independent National High School : Tikalaan National High School	Talakag	Bukidnon
2010-04-20	10082	Converting a High School Annex into an Independent National High School : Dalirig National High School	Manolo Fortich	Bukidnon
2010-04-22	10083	Amending the Aurora Special Economic Zone Act of 2007 or RA 9490	Casiguran	Aurora
2010-05-05	10084	Granting Survivorship Benefits to Surviving Spouse of a Deceased Retired Member of the COA, CSC, COMELEC, and the Ombudsman		
2010-05-05	10085	Converting a State College Campus into a Separate State College : North Luzon Philippines State College	Candon City	Ilocos Sur
2010-05-12	10086	Strengthening Peoples' Nationalism through Philippine History Act		
2010-05-13	10087	Changing the Name of a Bureau : National Library of the Philippines		
2010-05-13	10088	Anti-Camcording Act of 2010		
2010-05-13	10089	Philippine Rubber Research Institute Act of 2010		
2010-05-14	10090	Establishing a Municipal Hospital : Aguinaldo Municipal Hospital	Aguinaldo	Ifugao
2010-05-14	10091	Converting a Road into National Road : Cumadcad-San Isidro-Poblacion Road	Castilla	Sorsogon
2010-05-14	10092	Converting a Road into National Road : Alfonso Lista-Aurora Road	Alfonso Lista	Ifugao
2010-05-14	10093	Converting a Road into National Road : Paniqui-Ramos Road	Paniqui, and Ramos	Tarlac
2010-05-14	10094	Converting a Road into National Road : Alilem-Sugpon-Sudipen Road	[Ilocos] Alilem, and Sugpon; [La Union] Sudipen	Ilocos Sur, and La Union
2010-05-14	10095	Converting a Road into National Road : Sanga-Sanga-Patal Road	Bongao	Tawi-Tawi
2010-05-14	10096	Converting a Road into National Road : Socorro-Nueva Estrella-Pamosaingan Road	Socorro	Surigao del Norte
2010-05-14	10097	Converting a Road into National Road : Kiling, Tanauan-Tabontabon-Julita Road	Tanauan, Tabontabon, and Julita	Leyte
2010-05-14	10098	Converting a Road into National Road : Imelda-Bayog-Kumalarang-Lapuyan-Margosatubig Road	INFO NEEDED	Zamboanga Del Sur, and Zamboanga Sibugay
2010-05-14	10099	Converting a Road into National Road : Santa Barbara-New Lucena Road	New Lucena, and Santa Barbara	Iloilo
2010-05-14	10100	Converting a Road into National Road	INFO NEEDED	Negros Oriental
2010-05-14	10101	Converting a Road into National Road : Umus Mataha-Tanduan-Boki-Pawan-Lupa Pula Road	Mapun	Tawi-Tawi
2010-05-14	10102	Converting a Road into National Road	Milaor, Pili, and Naga City	Camarines Sur
2010-05-14	10103	Converting a Road into National Road	Calabanga	Camarines Sur
2010-05-14	10104	Converting a Road into National Road	INFO NEEDED	Lanao Del Norte
2010-05-14	10105	Converting a Road into National Road : Corrales Extension Street	Cagayan de Oro	Misamis Oriental
2010-05-14	10106	Converting a High School Annex into an Independent National High School : Santa Lucia National High School	Pagadian City	Zamboanga Del Sur
2010-05-14	10107	Establishing a National High School : Agripino Manalo National High School	Pateros	NCR
2010-05-14	10108	Establishing a National High School : Damit National High School	Bayog	Zamboanga Del Sur
2010-05-14	10109	Establishing a National High School : Baluno National High School	Dimataling	Zamboanga Del Sur
2010-05-14	10110	Establishing a National High School : Lanag Norte National High School	Tubungan	Iloilo
2010-05-14	10111	Converting a High School Annex into an Independent National High School : San Roque National High School	Antipolo City	Rizal
2010-05-14	10112	Converting a High School Annex into an Independent National High School : Maximo L. Gatlabayan Memorial National High School	Antipolo City	Rizal
2010-05-14	10113	Establishing a National High School : Betinan National High School	San Miguel	Zamboanga Del Sur
2010-05-14	10114	Converting a High School Annex into an Independent National High School : Otto Lingue National High School	Pagadian City	Zamboanga Del Sur
2010-05-14	10115	Converting a High School Annex into an Independent National High School : Aurora National High School	Aurora	Zamboanga Del Sur
2010-05-14	10116	Establishing a National High School : Dao-an National High School	San Miguel	Zamboanga Del Sur
2010-05-14	10117	Establishing a National High School : Bulawan National High School	Lapuyan	Zamboanga Del Sur
2010-05-14	10118	Establishing a National High School : Laureano Salusod National High School	Dimataling	Zamboanga Del Sur
2010-05-14	10119	Establishing a National High School : Malim National High School	Tabina	Zamboanga Del Sur
2010-05-14	10120	Converting a High School Annex into an Independent National High School : Lilingayon National High School	Valencia City	Bukidnon
2010-05-27	10121	Philippine Disaster Risk Reduction and Management Act of 2010		
2010-05-27	10122	Amending RA 7165 : Strengthening the Literacy Coordinating Council		
2010-06-03	10123	Creating additional Branches of the Regional Trial Court	Alabel	Sarangani
2010-06-03	10124	Changing the Name of a Library : Sentro ng Karunungan Library	Manila City	NCR
2010-06-03	10125	Converting a High School Annex into an Independent National High School : Lourdes National High School	Pagadian City	Zamboanga Del Sur
2010-06-03	10126	Establishing a National High School : Vedasto R. Santiago High School	San Miguel	Bulacan
2010-06-03	10127	Establishing a National High School : Julian B. Sumbillo High School	Norzagaray	Bulacan
2010-06-03	10128	Establishing a National High School : Allig National Agricultural and Trade High School	Flora	Apayao
2010-06-03	10129	Establishing a National High School : San Francisco National Agricultural and Trade High School	Luna	Apayao
2010-06-03	10130	Establishing a National High School : Swan National Agricultural and Trade High School	Pudtol	Apayao
2010-06-03	10131	Converting a High School Annex into an Independent National High School : San Juan National High School	Antipolo City	Rizal
2010-06-03	10132	Establishing a National High School : San Fernando City National Vocational High School	San Fernando City	La Union
2010-06-03	10133	Establishing a National High School : Luna National Vocational High School	Luna	La Union
2010-06-03	10134	Establishing a National High School : Locuban National High School	Dumalinao	Zamboanga Del Sur
2010-06-03	10135	Establishing a National High School : Tina National High School	Dumalinao	Zamboanga Del Sur
2010-06-03	10136	Converting a Road into National Road : Piñan-Mutia Road	Piñan, and Mutia	Zamboanga Del Norte
2010-06-03	10137	Converting a Road into National Road : Rawis-Talisay Road	Laoang	Northern Samar
2010-06-03	10138	Converting a Road into National Road : Shoe Avenue	Marikina	NCR
2010-06-03	10139	Converting a Road into National Road	Caloocan	NCR
2010-06-03	10140	Converting a Road into National Road : Bacolod-Madalum Highway	INFO NEEDED	Lanao Del Norte, and Lanao Del Sur
2010-06-03	10141	Converting a Road into National Road : Tanjay-Pamplona-Santa Catalina Road	Santa Catalina, Pamplona, and Tanjay City	Negros Oriental
2010-08-16	10142	Financial Rehabilitation and Insolvency Act of 2010 : Repealing the Insolvency Law or Act 1956		
2010-07-31	10143	Philippine Tax Academy Act		
2010-05-31	10144	Granting Citizenship to a Person		
2010-08-20	10145	Converting a High School Annex into an Independent National High School : Matam National High School	Katipunan	Zamboanga Del Norte
2010-08-20	10146	Converting a High School Annex into an Independent National High School : Diongan National High School	Siayan	Zamboanga Del Norte
