= Datu Lipus Makapandong National High School =

Location
- Rosario, Agusan del Sur, Caraga; Philippines; 8.04637°N 126.06154°E

Information
- Type: Public high school
- Established: 2002; 24 years ago

Datu Lipus Makapandong National High School is a secondary school located at D.O. Plaza Avenue, Poblacion, Rosario, Agusan del Sur, Philippines. It was first located at the municipal gymnasium of Rosario since its foundation in 2002 as a community high school. It was converted into a National High School through R.A. 9868 from a Community High School last 2009. It was first headed by Santiago M. Eliseo and was succeeded by Voit D. Quicos last 2009.

The name Datu Lipus Makapandong was given to the school in honor of Agusan del Sur governor Democrito Plaza because it was his tribal name. Every December, DLMNHS celebrates its founding anniversary.
