= Adoption in the Philippines =

This is a summary of the general adoption process in the Philippines.

Adoption in the Philippines is a process of granting social, emotional and legal family and kinship membership to an individual from the Philippines, usually a child. It involves a transfer of parental rights and obligations and provides family membership. The Department of Social Welfare and Development (DSWD) defines adoption as a "socio-legal process of giving a permanent family to a child whose parents have voluntarily or involuntarily given up their parental rights."

Philippine Republic Act 8552, also known as the Domestic Adoption Act of 1998, recognizes that children should grow up with their biological parents; however, should the efforts of biological parents to raise their child be insufficient, other members of the extended family may take on the responsibility of parenthood for the child. It is only when members of the extended family are not available that adoption by non-relatives is allowed to take place.

== Recognized types ==
The DSWD recognizes three major types of domestic adoption within the Philippines: agency adoption and relative adoption. Agency adoption refers to the procedure by which a legally accredited agency finds potential families for children who are put up for adoption. Relative adoption is when the biological parents of a child renounce their claim over the child to a relative or a member of their extended family. As for inter-country adoption, it is the process of matching a child with a family outside of the Philippines through the collaboration of local and foreign adoption agencies.

=== Agency adoption ===
Agency adoption occurs when a DSWD-licensed agency finds adoptive families for children. Agency adoption targets three actors: the biological parents, the child who will be up for adoption, and the adopters. Philippine state policies and procedures regarding adoption aims to balance and safeguard the rights and welfare of the stated actors.

==== Procedures for agency adoption ====
===== Pre-adoption =====
The DSWD provides for pre-adoption procedures as stipulated in RA 8552 in order to safeguard parents from making hurried decisions, as well as safeguard the child from unnecessary separation from his or her biological parents. The pre-adoption procedures are generally concerned with counseling the actors involved in order to ensure their mental and emotional well-being throughout the entire adoption process.

====== Counseling of biological parents ======
Counseling of biological parents attempts to ensure they are well-informed of the implications of surrendering their child for adoption. This measure is important in safeguarding against hasty choices born out of potential emotional and financial pressures.

Information provided during the counseling sessions focus on making sure the biological parent understands that he or she is fully relinquishing their parental authority over the child, which entails having no further contact with their child. However, if the child wishes, he or she may initiate communication with their parents in the future. Biological parents are also given the right to reconsider giving up their child for adoption within three months of signing the Deed of Voluntary Commitment (DVC), which is a document that formalizes the relinquishment of their child.

Any expressed desire to commit a child to adoption will only be binding after the actual birth of the child so as to give the biological parents enough opportunity to assess their available alternatives. Counseling services for biological parents are also available after their child has been surrendered in order to assist in coping with guilt or feelings of loss.

Should the biological parents of the child be unknown, the DSWD or the child-placing agency has the duty to explore all avenues in order to locate the biological parents of a child. Efforts are deemed sufficient when there exists: 1) certification from a local or national radio or television station that the case was aired on three different occasions; 2) publication of the case in one newspaper of general circulation; 3) certification from the police, barangay, Philippine Red Cross, National Headquarters (NHQ), or Social Service Division that the child's parents could not be found; and 4) returned mail to the last known address of the parent(s) or known relatives.

====== Counseling for prospective adoptive parents ======
Prospective adoptive parents are mandated to go through a counseling process as well as join an adoption forum in order to be prepared for effective parenting.

Counseling should help prospective adoptive parents come to terms with the reasons behind their decision to adopt. With regards to infertility in particular, counseling is necessary in order to make sure the adopters internalize the concept that the adopted child is not merely there as a substitute child until they are able to conceive.

The social worker is also responsible for making sure the prospective adopters understand are familiar with the adoption process. This is also when prospective parents are coached on how and when to discuss and disclose the child's adopted status to the adoptee, as well as how to answer questions about their biological parents.

====== Counseling of the adoptee ======
Older children are also included in counseling to help them understand that the people who will be adopting them will be their new parents. To the extent of the child's comprehension, the adoption process and legal implications will be explained to them. In the counseling sessions, the child is also given the opportunity to express their apprehensions and hopes for adoption.

===== Adoption procedures =====
====== Social Case Study Report ======
The Social Case Study Report (SCSR) is a written assessment conducted by a licensed social worker as to the child's social, economic, cultural, and psychosocial background, as well as details about the abandonment or neglect of the child. The report should also contain the efforts of the social worker to locate the child's biological parents/relatives.

The certification of counseling of both biological parents must be provided for the case study report to take place. The DSWD or child-placing agency then must prepare a case study report of the child and the biological parents. The social worker must confirm the real identity and registered name of the adoptee with the Civil Registry. If the adoptee is not registered, the social worker is responsible for facilitating the child's registration.

The case study report must contain the child's legal status, placement history, psychological, social, spiritual, medical, ethno-cultural background and that of his biological family needed in determining the most appropriate placement for him. After this, the child may be placed in the custody of the DSWD or a child-placing agency.

The social worker prepares a case study report on the prospective adopters as well, to make sure they can provide a suitable home for the child. The Supreme Court Rule on Adoption refers to this as a “home study report” “aimed to help the DSWD and courts ascertain the genuine intentions of the adopters.”

====== Matching process or family selection ======
Prospective adopters and the children legally available for adoption then meet at the matching table once the case study reports have been filed.

Matching is the major function of the Child Welfare Specialist Group (CWSG). This group is composed of five members: a social worker from DSWD, a lawyer, a physician, a psychologist, and NGO representative of adoptive parents or child welfare agencies. The DSWD Secretary has since created a National Child Welfare Specialist Group; the creation of a national matching committee was done in order to prevent delays in placing the child. Adopters are asked to specify their preferences in the child with whom they will be matched, including sex and age. The matching process also determines if the adopters are willing to adopt a child who has a developmental delay or disability.

With regards to religious affiliations, the Omnibus Guidelines on the Domestic Adoption Process state that religion can only be considered if the child is old enough to understand religious belief and practices. This age is generally pegged at 6 years old and above.

====== Placement and supervised trial custody ======
Upon the completion of the matching process, the social workers are then required to prepare the adoptive family and the child for placement. Once the DSWD has approved the placement, the department will issue the Pre-Adoption Placement Authority to transfer parental responsibility to the adoptive parents. This also marks the beginning of the supervised trial custody.

The supervised trial custody is defined as the period of time during which a social worker monitors the adjustment period and emotional preparedness of both adopters and adoptee in their new familial relationship. This entails monthly home visits to check up on the situation of the adopted child in his or her new family, after which the social worker must submit progress reports to the authorized body.

The duration of the supervised trial custody is six months; upon its culmination, the Consent to Adopt is issued by the DSWD. This time period should be waived if biological parents want to adopt their illegitimate child, or if foster parents want to adopt their foster child provided that a harmonious relationship exists between the child and his foster family.

====== Filing a petition for adoption ======
Potential adopters must then file the petition for adoption with the Family Court of their province in order to make the adoption official. This is the only point when the services of a lawyer are needed.

There are several provisions enumerated in the Supreme Court Rule on Adoption regarding the petition to be filed. It stipulates that this petition must be verified and state at the heading of the initiatory pleading its specific contents. These may consist of an application for a change of name, rectification of simulated birth, voluntary or involuntary commitment of children or declaration of the child as abandoned, dependent or neglected.

In the case of a request for a change of name, reasons must be stated. Along with this, the registered name, aliases (if any) and the proposed new name of the child must be listed.

If rectification of simulated birth is requested, the simulation of birth must have occurred prior to the date of effectivity of RA 8552 and the application for both the rectification and the petition must be filed within five years of the said date. The simulation of birth would be rectified for the best interests of the potential adoptee, and he or she must have been consistently treated as the petitioner's own child.

For the case where an abandoned, a dependent or neglected child is to be adopted, facts must be cited to prove this assertion, including the names and residence of the child's parents or guardians. The name of the accredited child-placement agency must also be stated together with their authorization to give consent.

The court shall only proceed to hear the petition once the order of hearing has been published and all stipulated requirements met. Both the petitioner and the potential adoptee must be present during the hearing, with the petitioner testifying before the judge on the said date. The social worker must also be present to ensure that all involved parties have been well assessed and have gone counseling so that they will be fully prepared.

The presence of both the petitioner and the adoptee is vital as through this the court may be able to better gauge the child's condition both individually and relative to the petitioner.

====== Decree of adoption ======
Only when all the requirements have been settled, can they move stage of the decree of adoption.

The provisions regarding the adoption decree can be found in RA 8552. They include the following. The decree of adoption phase will only be entered upon approval of the court with the best interests of the child put forward.

There will also be an amended certificate of birth issued by the Civil Registry. This reinforces the petitioner's claim to the adoptee by registering the child with a new surname. The previous birth certificate will also be cancelled and stamped appropriately.

The adoption decree will also contain the new name of the child. With the decree also comes the following, a certificate of finality to be issued by the Clerk of Court after the closure of the 15-day appeal period and a certified true copy of the adoption decree to be submitted by the adopter to the Civil Registrar within 30 days of the issuance of the certificate of finality. The Civil Registrar, after making the proper annotations to the decree of adoption, must then seal away the adoptee's original birth certificate, replacing it with a new birth certificate.

It is important to take note that the decree becomes effective upon filing of the Petition of Adoption. This completes the process of adoption as the petitioner can now legally refer to the adoptee as his or her own child.

==== Governing bodies for agency adoption ====
The DSWD oversees this process by providing a license for adoption agencies who are allowed to facilitate agency adoption. These adoption agencies are also supported by the ACCAP (The Association of the Child Caring Agencies of the Philippines) who have done so since their establishment in 1994.

=== Relative adoption ===
Relative adoption is the legal adoption of a child by a close family member. Before parents finalize their decision on putting up their child for adoption, they would consider all possible placement options. Most of the time they would rely on the help of family leading to informal arrangements. Such a set-up could lead to future complications, for instance in inheritance. Thus, to safeguard the child's rights and benefits, families should go through legal adoption. It is also advised that both birth parents and the prospective foster parents undergo counseling in order to fully prepare them to accept and respect the new dynamic for the benefit of the child. As for the proper procedure to be followed for a legal relative adoption, the steps listed above from Placement and Supervised Trial Custody until Decree of Adoption must be followed.

=== Independent adoption ===
Independent adoption is the legal adoption of a child by an acquaintance of the biological parents of the child or a stranger encountered through an intermediary. It shares a lot of similarities to relative adoption in terms of how the process is facilitated. It primarily differs in the potential adoptive parents who in this case are not blood-related to the biological parents and therefore the child. An implication of this is that the child may no longer be monitored as much as the biological parents could in the case of relative adoption. For the procedure for the independent adoption to be legalized, the steps beginning from Placement and Supervised Trial Custody up until Decree of Adoption must be followed.

Private or independent adoptions is the act of either placing a child under a family known by the child's biological parents or placing a child under a parent or parents who are interested in adopting the child.

=== Inter-Country adoption ===
Inter-country adoption is done as a last resort, and only when opportunities for local adoption has been exhausted and for the best interest of the child as per UNICEF, Hague and Philippine

From 1996 to June 2011, inter-country adoption matches were numbered to be around:

1. Regular adoption (4,075)
2. Relative adoption or adoption by a relative within the 4th degree of consanguinity (1,277)
3. Special needs adoption which involves older children who require particular medical attention (1,020)
4. Independent placement which "refers to children who should be adopted due to exceptional circumstances (ex. when a foundling is left at the doorstep of a house)" (214)
5. Medical mission adoption which is a temporary adoption by a host family of children in need of a special operation (54)

==== Costs ====
As of 2007, cost of application for inter-country adoption as well as the processing fee for single placement is around US$3,200 which may vary depending on where the child came from as well as where they will go. For a sibling group of two or more, the processing fee will have an additional US$1,000.00 regardless of the number of siblings. This is in addition to the costs of travel as well as other documents such as passport, visas, medical and psychological tests of both the child and the PAP

== Legislation ==
=== Domestic adoption ===
==== Evolution of domestic adoption laws ====
===== Old Civil Code =====
The first laws about adoption in the Philippines were written in the Spanish Civil Code of 1889 which was put into effect through a Royal Decree by the Spanish Government. Most of the provisions here were adopted by the Philippines during their formulation of their own Civil Code in 1993. The provisions during this time placed importance on the adopter since the process back then was seen as something beneficial for said adopter. Civil Law expert and former Senator Arturo Tolentino states that "persons who had no children were allowed to adopt so that they may experience the joys of paternity and have an object of their instincts of parenthood". Most articles concerned with adoption in this Civil Law prioritized the adopter and his interests over the adoptee. This can be seen in how one article stated that those who already had natural, legitimate and legitimated children were not allowed to adopt. The Spanish Civil Code and its provisions on adoption continued to take effect in the Philippines up until the end of the American Occupation on June 4, 1946.

===== New Civil Code =====
On August 30, 1950 the Civil Code of the Philippines was enacted by the Senate and House of Representatives under Republic Act No. 386. Articles 334 through 347, which can be seen in the first Book of the Civil Code which is concerned with the Person and Family Relations, contain the provisions with regard to adoption. Some provisions from the Spanish Civil Code were carried over to this such as the individuals prohibited from adopting. Aside from those who already had natural children or natural children by legal fiction, prohibitions for the guardian of the child "before the approval of his accounts", individuals who have yet to receive approval from their spouses, foreign nationals who are not residents of the Philippines, and citizens who have committed a crime which was penalized with six months imprisonment or more were added in this new iteration of the Civil Code. However, the view on adoption had begun to change by this time with Tolentino stating that adoption was "now being given a social and moral purpose", which was to provide to the adoptee "the protection of society in the person of the adopter". The provisions which reflect these views would not be seen until the release of the New Civil Code. The logic behind restricting adoption to those who had no natural children was that the purpose of adoption was to "afford to persons who have no child of their own the consolation of having one by creating, through legal fiction, the relation of paternity and filiation where none exists by blood relationship". It was also to prevent conflicts arising from the introduction of a foreign element into a family which already had children. The requirements for adoption were also made clear in article 334 which stated that adoption may be requested by "[e]very person of age, who is in full possession of his civil rights". Aside from these, provisions about who may and may not be adopted, as well as the list of individuals from whom a written consent must be obtained are also present. The rights and duties of the adopted individual, as well as the cases wherein adoption may be revoked are also listed in this chapter.

===== Presidential Decree No. 603 =====
On June 10, 1975, President Ferdinand E. Marcos enacted Presidential Decree No. 603 also known as the Child and Youth Welfare Code. In here, the old provisions regarding who were allowed to adopt were repealed by Article 27. The adopter still had to be in full possession of his civil rights before he could adopt but now, even those who already had natural children or natural children by legal fiction were allowed to adopt as long as they could provide support and care for all the children. Among the new provisions added were those requiring the Department of Social Welfare and Development to make a case study of the adoptee, his natural parents, and the prospective adoptive parents before an adoption petition may be granted. A trial custody of at least six months is also required from the prospective adoptive parents so that their "adjustment and emotional readiness for the legal union" may be determined. Once the court is satisfied with the results of the trial custody and the report of the DSWD, a decree of adoption, which states the name that the adopted child will be known from then on, is issued.

===== Family Code =====
Through Executive Order No. 209, which was enacted on August 3, 1988 by President Corazon C. Aquino, the Family Code of the Philippines added some new provisions with regard to adoption. Here, importance was placed on the welfare of the adoptee, unlike past provisions which prioritized the adopter. The provisions of the Civil Code of the Philippines with regard to adoption were also repealed. Here, as opposed to the Civil Code wherein a person of any age may be adopted, only minors were allowed to be adopted with those older only being adoptable under certain conditions. It was also here where aliens were disqualified from adopting Filipinos, except if it were an adoption by a relative provided that: 1) the adopter is a former Filipino who is adopting a blood relative, 2) the adopter is adopting the legitimate child of his / her spouse, or 3) the adopter is married to a Filipino citizen and they seek to jointly adopt the blood relative of the latter. Cases which did not fall under the three exceptions were subject to the provisions of inter-country adoption but these were not yet in present in 1988.

===== Domestic Adoption Act of 1998 =====
After the Inter-Country Adoption Law was passed in 1995, the DSWD felt that it was also time to make amendments with regard to Domestic Adoption Laws which led RA 8552, also known as the Domestic Adoption Act of 1998. Here, the old provisions in the Family Code were repealed and more provisions with regard to who can adopt, particularly those concerned with aliens or foreign nationals, were listed. It was also stated here that the petition for adoption may only be filed in the "Family Court of the province or city where the prospective adoptive parents reside."

===== Republic Act 9523 =====
Further amendments to this were made through RA 9523, which tackled issues about abandoned children whose parents did not leave signed documents entrusting them to the DSWD. The time of declaring the individual available for adoption, up until the certification was shortened from a year to just over a month with the decision to make it an administrative process instead of a judicial process. Now, one would only need a certification signed by the DSWD secretary instead of a judicial order for the declaration of the abandonment of a child.

===== Foster Care Act of 2012 =====
On June 11, 2012, Republic Act No. 10165, also known as the Foster Care Act of 2012, was approved by Congress. Here, provisions were made regarding the procedure on how a foster parent may become the adoptive parents of a child under his care.

===== Domestic Administrative Adoption and Alternative Child Care Act =====
On January 6, 2022, President Rodrigo Duterte has signed Republic Act 11642, also known as the Domestic Administrative Adoption and Alternative Child Care Act, simplifying the adoption process in the country. The law transfers all adoption and alternative child care-related duties and functions of government agencies to a new body, the National Authority for Child Care (NACC), and its regional offices. The law also sets a specific length of time on which the NACC and its regional offices should decide on petitions for adoption, as well as act on other requirements. The legislation also penalizes abuse and exploitation of children, and the fictitious registration of the birth of a child under a person who is not their biological parent or simulation of birth.

==== Eligibility and requirements ====
===== For Adopters =====
The latest eligibility requirements for those who may adopt and may be adopted can be seen in the Domestic Adoption Act of 1998. According to Article III section 7, "[a]ny Filipino citizen of legal age, in possession of full civil capacity and legal rights, of good moral character, has not been convicted of any crime involving moral turpitude, emotionally and psychologically capable of caring for children, at least sixteen years older than the adoptee, and who is in a position to support and care for their children in keeping with the means of the family" may adopt. Also the age gap requirement may be waived "when the adopter is the biological parent of the adoptee, or is the spouse of the adoptee's parent." Also "[a]ny alien possessing the same qualifications as above stated for Filipino nationals: Provided, That their country has diplomatic relations with the Republic of the Philippines, that they have been living in the Philippines for at least three continuous years prior to the filing of the application for adoption and maintains such residence until the adoption decree is entered, that they have been certified by their diplomatic or consular office or any appropriate government agency that they have the legal capacity to adopt in their country, and that their government allows the adoptee to enter their country as their adopted child" may adopt. The alien's for requirements for their residency and certification, which are required for adoption, may also be waived if there is: 1) "a former Filipino citizen who seeks to adopt a relative within the fourth degree of consanguinity", 2) "one who seeks to adopt the legitimate child of their Filipino spouse", or 3) "one who is married to a Filipino citizen and seeks to adopt jointly with their spouse a relative within the fourth degree of consanguinity or affinity of the Filipino spouse". The guardian with respect to the wad after the termination of the guardianship and clearance of their financial accountabilities" is allowed to adopt.

As long as an individual meets all these qualifications, he / she may adopt. This means that even relatives by blood or affinity may adopt one another. The state does its best to make sure that the "natural parents’ authority and custody of their children" be maintained. Only when this fails and when there are no requests by the child's extended family to adopt him / her does adoption by an unrelated person become considered.

The law also ensures that the adopter has the capacity to raise the adoptee. Hence, he / she must be emotionally, psychologically, and financially capable of caring for the child. These requirements are vital in order to ensure that the quality of life of the natural children would not be negatively affected by the introduction of the adopted children. The criteria for evaluating prospective adopters have been taken from the Child Welfare League of America, Inc. Among these are the prospective adopters’ total personality, emotional maturity, the quality of their marital relationship, their feeling about children, their feeling about childlessness and readiness to adopt and motivation.

Conviction for a crime is necessary for the disqualification of a prospective adopter since the accused is always presumed innocent and so commission of a crime would not necessarily equate to moral turpitude. A pardon from a crime would not rescind the prospective adopter's disqualification since he / she was still convicted, regardless if the penalty was imposed or not. The prospective adopter must not have been convicted of a crime involving moral turpitude since this would affect his / her ability to rear a child.

The age difference of 16 years was formulated as a solution to a problem brought about by raising the marriageable age. Before, a 15-year age requirement was required since this was the midway point of the marriageable age of 14 for females and 16 for males. However, when the marriageable age was raised to 18, the Civil Code Committee, which drafted the family Code, proposed to have this raised to 18 as well. This was deemed too much, however, and since a lot of prospective adopters would have been disqualified if it were to be followed. In order to solve this, the age of difference of 16 years was chosen.

Although the advanced age of prospective adopters is considered, their health and the kind of home they could provide to the adoptees are more important. Placing a child in the care of an individual who was advanced in age but in good health was seen as more desirable than leaving the child with a public agency.

Before, adoption by aliens was prohibited in the provisions of adoption in the Family Code. However, this was changed as long as the aliens had the added conditions mentioned above.

With regard to the provisions about the termination of an individual's guardianship before he / she may be allowed to adopt, this is to ensure that the ward's rights have not been violated or improperly managed by the guardian. This is also so that conduct of the guardian's may be evaluated. The guardian must also be financially capable in order to "prevent unscrupulous guardians from escaping liability for their impropriety."

===== For Adoptees =====
As mandated in Section 8 of the Domestic Adoption Act of 1998, the following may be adopted: "Any person below eighteen years of age who has been administratively or judicially declared available for adoption; the legitimate son / daughter of one spouse by the other spouse; an illegitimate son / daughter by a qualified adopter to improve his / her status to that of legitimacy; a person of legal age if, prior to the adoption, said person has been consistently considered and treated by the adopter(s) as his / her own child since minority; a child whose adoption has been previously rescinded; and a child whose biological or adoptive parent(s) has died: Provided, That no proceedings shall be initiated within six months from the time of death of said parent(s)."

Generally, only minors may be adopted since those of legal age are believed to be capable of taking care of themselves. However, there are exceptions to this namely: when the adoptee is the illegitimate child of the adopter, when the adoptee is the legitimate child of his / her spouse, or when the child has been "consistently treated as a child of the adopter during minority", in which case a de facto adoption is made. This de facto adoption foregoes the requirement that a child be a minor because of the assumption that the adoptee was not adopted while he / she was a minor simply because the adopter failed to do so. However, this de facto adoption must be converted to a legal adoption for the adoptee to receive all the proper privileges, rights and duties.

==== Joint adoption applications ====
The provisions with regard to joint adoptions by husband and wife, which were repealed in the Family Code, were retained in the Domestic Adoption Act of 1998. This is required for all married couples which want to adopt except in the following cases: 1) "If one spouse seeks to adopt the legitimate son / daughter of the other", 2) "if one spouse seeks to adopt his / her own illegitimate son / daughter: Provided, however, That the other spouse has signified his / her consent thereto", or 3) "if the spouses are legally separated from each other". The process is similar to normal adoptions. In cases where there is a conflict between husband and wife, "the father's decision shall prevail unless there is a judicial order to the contrary" according to Article 211 of the Family Code.

=== Intercountry adoption ===
==== Evolution of inter-country adoption laws ====
Act No. 3094 was the first law for allowed foreign adoption which allowed any public or charitable child-caring institution to allow adoption for either Filipinos or aliens. In the Civil Code of 1950, Art. 335 prohibited foreign adoption to countries the Philippines does not have diplomatic ties with to prevent conflicts of blood and identity in the case of war. In 1975, the Child and Youth Welfare Code became the legal basis for inter-country adoption allowing for non-resident aliens to adopt in court if qualified. The shift of adoption authority from judicial to the Director of Social Services and Development (DSWD) happened in the Council for the Welfare of Children (1976). When the 1988 Family Code was implemented aliens were disqualified from adopting except a) a former Filipino citizen adopting a relative, 2) adopting the legitimate child of his/her Filipino spouse and 3) spouse of a Filipino citizen seeking to adopt jointly a relative of the Filipino. All aliens not in these allowances have to comply with an inter-country adoption act the senate made seven years later.

The ratification of the UN Convention of the Rights of the Child in 1990 and the Hague Convention on the Protection of Children and Cooperation in Respect to Inter-country Adoption drove the Philippines to make R.A. No. 8043.

==== Inter-country Adoption Act of 1995 ====
In response to the UN Convention on the Rights of the Child (September 2, 1990), the 1995 Hague Convention on the Protection of Children and Cooperation in Respect of Inter-country Adoption (January 8, 1996), and Art. 184 of the Family Code, the Senate drafted R.A. No. 8043 which will be the central legal basis for inter-country adoption on June 7, 1995. This was following Senators Osmena and Coseteng's (sponsor) alarm over the advertising placements of Filipino children in US publications "that range from $3000 to $15000".

The law applies to aliens except 1) a former Filipino citizen seeking to adopt a relative by consanguinity, 2) one who seeks to adopt the legitimate child of his/her Filipino spouse, 3) joint adoption with a Filipino spouse of his/her relative by consanguinity. as well as Filipino citizens residing permanently abroad. Aliens must have lived in the Philippines at least three continuous years before filing for adoption as well as have a higher minimum age of 27 compared to domestic adoption.

===== Inter-Country Adoption Board =====
The law establishes the Inter-Country Adoption Board (ICAB) to be the central authority in inter-country adoption in the Philippines. They are responsible for licensing local and foreign child-caring/placement agencies, collecting fees, and matching. The ICAB works in coordination with Department of Social Welfare and Development (DSWD), Department of Justice (DOJ) and Department of Foreign Affairs (DFA) which are all involved in inter-country adoption.

===== Guidelines for child adoptability =====
1. Child must be below 15 years of age
2. Child must be legally free meaning he/she was voluntarily or involuntarily committed to the DSWD or child-placing or caring agency freely in accordance with the Child and Youth Welfare Code

==== Has a certification from DSWD declaring the legality of the child's availability for adoption (R.A. 9523 of 2009) ====
1. Has child study, birth or foundling certificate, deed of voluntary commitment, medical certificate and psychological evaluation
2. Written consent by the child if he/she is above 10 years of age

===== Guidelines for Child Adoptee =====
The alien or Filipino permanently residing abroad must be at least 27 years of age and 16 years older than the child. A joint adoption must be done in the case of marriage. He/she/they must be eligible to adopt under Philippine, UN and their foreign national laws from a country wherein the Philippines must have diplomatic relations. From the Domestic Adoption Act, he/she has to have been living in the Philippines for at least three continuous years prior to the filing of the petition and stays until the adoption decree is entered.

According to the ICAB, marital requirements also apply

- Minimum length of marriage requirement for ICA applicants is 3 years;
- Applicants who have lived together in a common law relationship for several years culminating in a legal marriage must be married for at least one year and the stability of the relationship prior to marriage ios taken into consideration;
- Single applicants are not prohibited from applying but effective July 2007 the Board has set a moratorium on the acceptance of single applicants unless the child preference is a child with special needs (older or sibling group);
- PAPs with history of divorce: since stability of marriage will ensure the permanency of the placement, a maximum of two divorce histories will be accepted.

Additional requirements set by the ICAB include

- Educational requirements: must have at least a high school diploma
- Income requirements: must have a minimum annual income of US$40,000.00
- Single applicants: Resources for older children between 9–15 years old.

===== Inter-country adoption procedure =====
As of Section 10, 11 and 14, the prospective adoptive parent (PAP) must apply to the ICAB, or the Philippine Regional Trial Court through an intermediate foreign agency. Requirements such as the applicant's birth certificate, home study, written consent of biological or adopted children if above 10 years of age, medical and psychological evaluations, income tax returns and police clearance are needed for the application process. The waiting period for the Board to approve the application is 3 months to 1 year.

Once the application is approved, matching a suitable child to the family is done depending on the preferences PAP. The availability of a child for adoption is determined by the DSWD, determining if it will be in the child's best interests. Matching is done by the Board which includes the head or social worker of the agency, a child psychologist, a medical doctor, a lawyer, and a representative of an NGO engaged in child welfare. The waiting time usually takes 2 to 4 years after the approval of the PAP. Acceptance of a special needs child or older (73 months and above) generally shortens the waiting period. Upon approval of the PAPs of the matching, the Philippine law compels adopters to personally fetch the child from the Philippines not later than thirty (30) working days after issuance of visa of the child.

The Philippine Inter-country Adoption Law requires a six months post placement period or trial custody period where three Post Placement Supervisory Reports along with pictures of the child and the PAPs (or extended family) must be submitted to the ICAB. If successful, a Consent to Adoption between the parents and the ICAB within fifteen (15) days of last post placement report. The final step is a petition for adoption with the court in the country the parent resides.

===== Penalties =====
Knowing violations of the law shall incur monetary fines and imprisonment ranging from one to twelve years and fines of at least PHP5000. Violations include "1) consent for adoption taken by coercion, and improper material inducement, 2) no authority from the Board, 3) procedures and safeguards not complied with, and 4) child to be adopted is subjected or exposed to danger, abuse and exploitation."

==== Supporting laws and conventions ====
- E.O. 209 (Family Code)
- P.D. 603 (Child and Youth Welfare Code)
- Act. No. 3094
- Civil Code of 1995 Art. 335
- A.O. No. 150 of 1981
- E.O. 91
- UN Convention on the Rights of the Child (ratified 1990)
- Hague Convention on the Protection of Children and Cooperation in Respect of Inter-country Adoption

== Facts and figures ==
From 2009 to 2015, a total of 4,860 children have been issued a certification declaring them legally available for adoption, with 2,533 children still waiting to be adopted. DSWD had reported 9,017 Filipino children matched for inter-country adoption from 1995 to 2014. In 2014 there were 415 children placed for inter-country adoption and 1,536 for domestic adoption.

The distribution of children served through child placement services in the Philippines, both region-wise and age-wise, are found in the table below.

Region	Alternative Family Care Program											
Region	Number of Children Served Through Child Placement Policies											
Region	Adoption Services									Foster Care Service		
Region	Issued with CDCLAA			Issued with PAPA/ACA			Cleared for Inter-Country Adoption (ICA)			Foster Care Service		
Region	Total	Male	Female	Total	Male	Female	Total	Male	Female	Total	Male	Female
Total	687	367	320	357	147	210	348	195	153	1,985	898	1,087
NCR	13	7	6	7	3	4	4	1	3	290	145	145
CAR	16	6	10	21	9	12	9	7	2	67	29	38
I	26	9	17	27	8	19	15	8	7	44	23	21
II	119	68	51	60	19	41	59	38	21	172	55	117
III	17	9	8	7	3	4	4	4	0	110	28	82
IV - A	15	4	11	10	5	5	8	5	3	112	75	37
IV - B	55	31	24	35	17	18	25	13	12	55	37	18
V	72	39	33	30	14	16	48	26	22	54	25	29
VI	22	9	13	2	1	1	9	3	6	42	17	25
VII	6	3	3	3	2	1	4	2	2	70	33	37
VIII	21	10	11	16	6	10	11	6	5	74	26	48
IX	42	24	18	29	16	13	10	6	4	600	265	335
X	8	8	-	3	0	3	7	3	4	127	66	61
XI	10	4	6	7	1	6	2	0	2	101	43	58
XII	227	124	103	17	8	9	15	8	7	40	14	26
Caraga	18	12	6	83	35	48	118	65	53	27	17	10
Age Group	687	367	320	357	147	210	348	195	153	1,985	898	1,087
0 to below 1	237	124	113	87	36	51	86	60	26	115	38	77
1 to below 5	255	133	122	161	71	90	117	66	51	229	96	133
5 to below 10	115	70	45	59	25	34	76	46	30	221	78	143
10 to below 14	63	31	32	27	6	21	54	16	38	129	60	69
14 to below 18	17	9	8	16	6	10	15	7	8	96	32	64
18 and above	0			7	3	4	0			4	2	2
No age bracket	0			0			0			1,191	592	599

Notes:

CDCLAA: Certification Declaring a Child Legally Available for Adoption

PAPA: Pre-Adoption Placement Authority

ACA: Affidavit of Consent to Adoption

Region XII, Soccsksargen, holds the highest concentration of permanent adoptions (18.61%, excluding Foster Care services), followed by Caraga (15.73%). Region VII, Central Visayas, holds the lowest concentration of permanent adoptions (0.93%). Similarly computed figures for specific documentation methods for adoption are as follows:

Issued with CDCLAA:
Highest	Region XII (33.04%)
2nd Highest	Region II (17.32%)
Lowest	Region VII (0.87%)

Issued with PAPA:
Highest	Region XII (33.04%)
2nd Highest	Region II (17.32%)
Lowest	Region VII (0.87%)

Cleared for ICA:
Highest	Region XII (33.04%)
2nd Highest	Region II (17.32%)
Lowest	Region VII (0.87%)

In terms of age group distributions, 1 to below 5 holds the highest concentration (38.29%, excluding Foster Care Services), followed by 0 to below 1 (29.45%). The bracket with the lowest concentration is 18 and above (0.5%). Once again, similarly computed figures for specific documentation methods for adoption are as follows:

Issued with CDCLAA:
Highest	1 to below 5 (37.12%)
2nd Highest	0 to below 1 (34.5%)
Lowest	18 and above (0%)

Issued with PAPA:
Highest	1 to below 5 (45.1%)
2nd Highest	0 to below 1 (24.37%)
Lowest	18 and above (1.96%)

Cleared for ICA:
Highest	1 to below 5 (33.62%)
2nd Highest	0 to below 1 (24.71%)
Lowest	18 and above (0%)

=== Commonly cited reasons for adoption ===
According to Social Welfare Officers in the Department of Social Welfare and Development, the four most noticeably common reasons for adoption cited are the following:

1. Mother is not yet of legal age.
2. Relationships are illicit.
3. Pregnancy is the product of abuses, such as rape.
4. Pregnancy is the product of incest.

It has also been noted that while poverty may be assumed by the general public to be a leading reason for adoption, this has actually not been the case. The DSWD makes efforts to provide funding and services to families that attempt to put children up for adoption due to poverty.

== Issues ==
=== Single parent adoption ===
There is a misconception that only married couples can legally adopt a child in the Philippines. The Department of Social Welfare and Development allows individual to adopt a child if they can prove to be capable of adopting a child. Sally Dagulo, head of the DSWD's Alternative Care Division, claims that the government agency is gender-sensitive and does not take account the gender orientation of anyone willing to adopt a child. Religion of a child is only considered when a child legally available for adoption is 6 years old and above, when the child usually already practices a religion.

=== LGBT adoption ===
LGBT adoption in the Philippines remains a gray area under the law on adoption. Same-sex couples may not file for joint adoption, given that same-sex unions is not recognized under the law. However, according to the eligibility requirements which govern Philippine domestic adoption, there are no explicit laws that bar LGBTQ+ individuals from adopting children. The requirements for being a prospective adopter do not take into consideration the adopter's sexual orientation or gender identity.

While this is the case, prospective LGBT adopters may still be considered unfit to adopt if the state decides that they do not have “good moral character”. The Civil Code, the Family Code, and the Child and Youth Welfare Code require that parents must be able to provide moral formation for the child. The abstract nature of this parental duty leaves the term open to interpretation. Depending on the inclinations of the state, someone who is LGBTQ+ may not be allowed to exercise parental authority over a child because the state has judged them as “immoral”.

=== Costs ===
Social Welfare Officers in the [Office] of the Department of Social Welfare and Development (DSWD) have cited that common criticisms of adoption include the difficulty of families to bear excess costs (most notably, legal fees), and the amount of time it takes for adoption processes to be fully completed, normally within 1–2 years. The DSWD has cited that they are in the middle of efforts towards consultation dialogues with court judges, in order to hasten the adoption process.

=== Stereotypes of adoption in media ===
Adoption cases are generally painted in a negative light, resulting from the stigma against foster parents being infertile couples. There is also a pervasive concept of the ampon who is viewed as a victim of abuse that prevents him or her from developing into a fully functioning adult. The DSWD has called out the exaggerated depiction of adoption in Philippine media; secretary Corazon Soliman of the DSWD has urged those responsible, such as telenovela writers, to portray cases of adoption in a good light instead.
