= Labor and the environment =

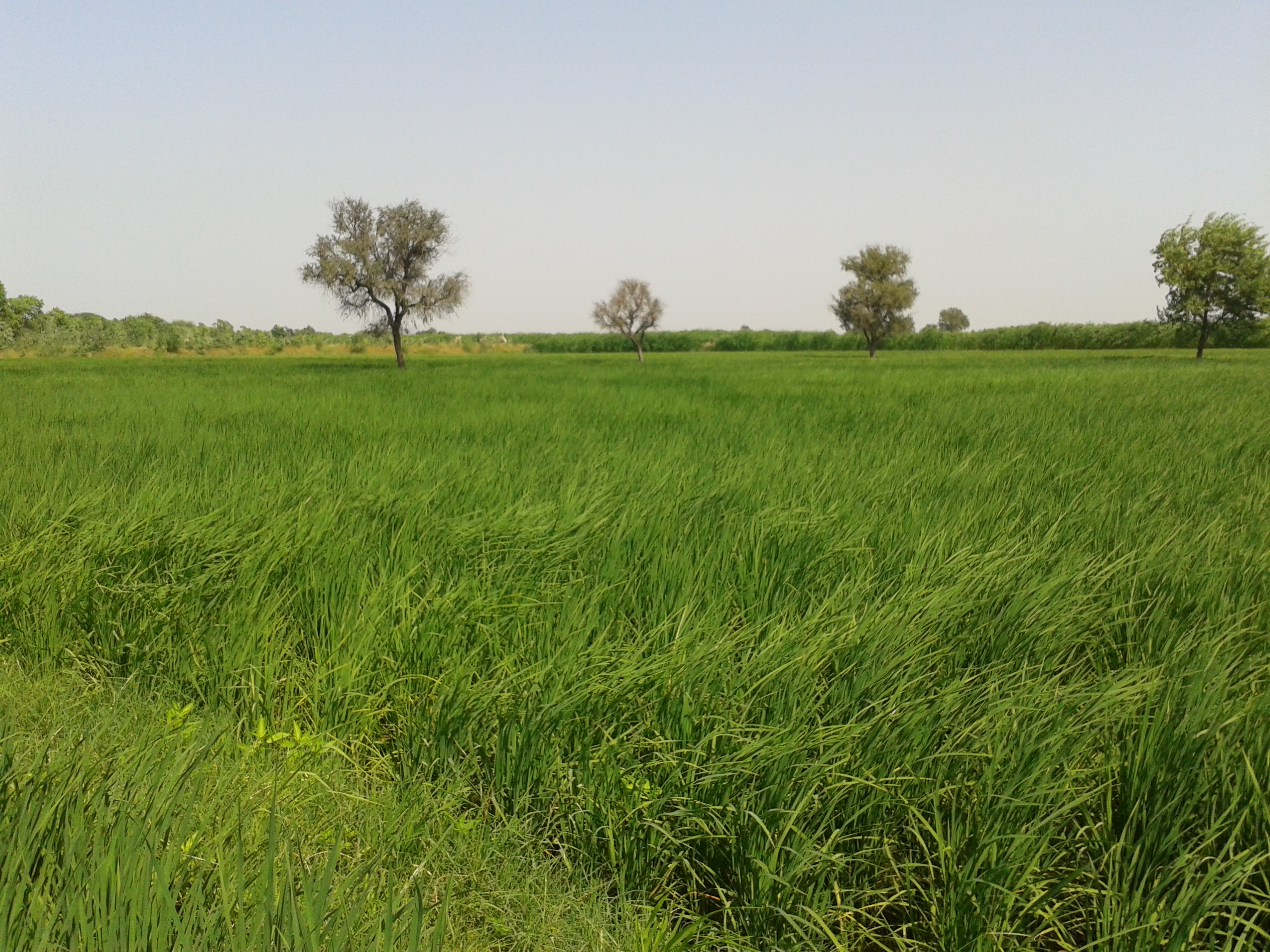

Labour and the environment are two different concepts that can be linked as one. Labour is defined as a task that is performed, typically for an economic return. Environment is defined as air, water, minerals, organisms, and all factors that contribute to ecology. It is the gregarious and cultural pressures that builds the lives of individuals or an entire population. Human labour in the forms of logging, mining, and tourism, have negatively impacted the functions of the environment in various countries that are part of the Organization for Economic Cooperation and Development (OECD) forum. The OECD is a list of 34 countries whose governments work together to ensure that the market economies function accordingly and strive to increase economic growth, wealth and sustainable development. The impacts of labour on the environment have been so large that many corporations and campaigns have begun, striving to change the way humans exert their abilities on the environment by implementing policies to limit negative outcomes.

Logging, mining and tourism damage the environment without proper resource management practices. Logging has created such a negative effect on New Zealand in particular, that a three year ban had been placed on logging to attempt to preserve the environment and reconstruct it to its original structure. The effects are dated as far back as 1960. At the end of the second world war, there were about 100,000 hectares of native forest, whereas today there is less than 17,000 hectares remaining in West Taupo District in New Zealand and many endangered species that resided in these forests are now extinct as a cause of logging. In terms of mining, the conflicts that have surfaced in Peru revolve around the inexperience workers that are hired to perform these tasks that incur a greater damage to the environment as they are not aware of the harm they are doing. There is a weakness around the environmental regulation in comparison to mining and many companies have taken over and negatively affected the environment in order to invest their wealth into new mining operations. Furthermore, tourism has contributed a great amount of stress to the environment. When individuals from other countries are visiting these OECD countries that are under great distress with the environment and pollution, in many cases they provide more harm than good by littering or removing plants or flowers as a souvenir but are unaware that the souvenirs are part of an endangered species. The popularity of tourism has resulted in damage towards the environment in many ways. Tourism has led to the growth of airports, hotels, and other organizations that have stripped away land in order to build and grow in the economic sector. Although tourism can have a positive impact on the economy it results in an environmentally unsustainable model for many areas.

The relationship between human labour and the environment and the types of work that humans have participated in have created a negative impact on many aspects of the environment including climate change and has resulted in the emerging green economy. The primary cause of climate change is humans and their work towards the environment overtime. A result of this has been the policies that have been put into place to ensure the environment will be protected moving forwards and to establish alternate routes for individuals when available to preserve the environment. The key focus is on the impact of human work on the environment, and the impact of the environment on human work. The green economy has emerged as a result of the negative outcomes. Specifically to Limpopo, Africa, there have been so many negative contributions affecting the way the environment functions that they have created a project to help reduce this issue. This project contributes to the green economy and has created policies that will be implemented to reduce negative outcomes and alternative routes when attaining energy, goods, infrastructure, etc.

== Causes ==
=== Logging ===
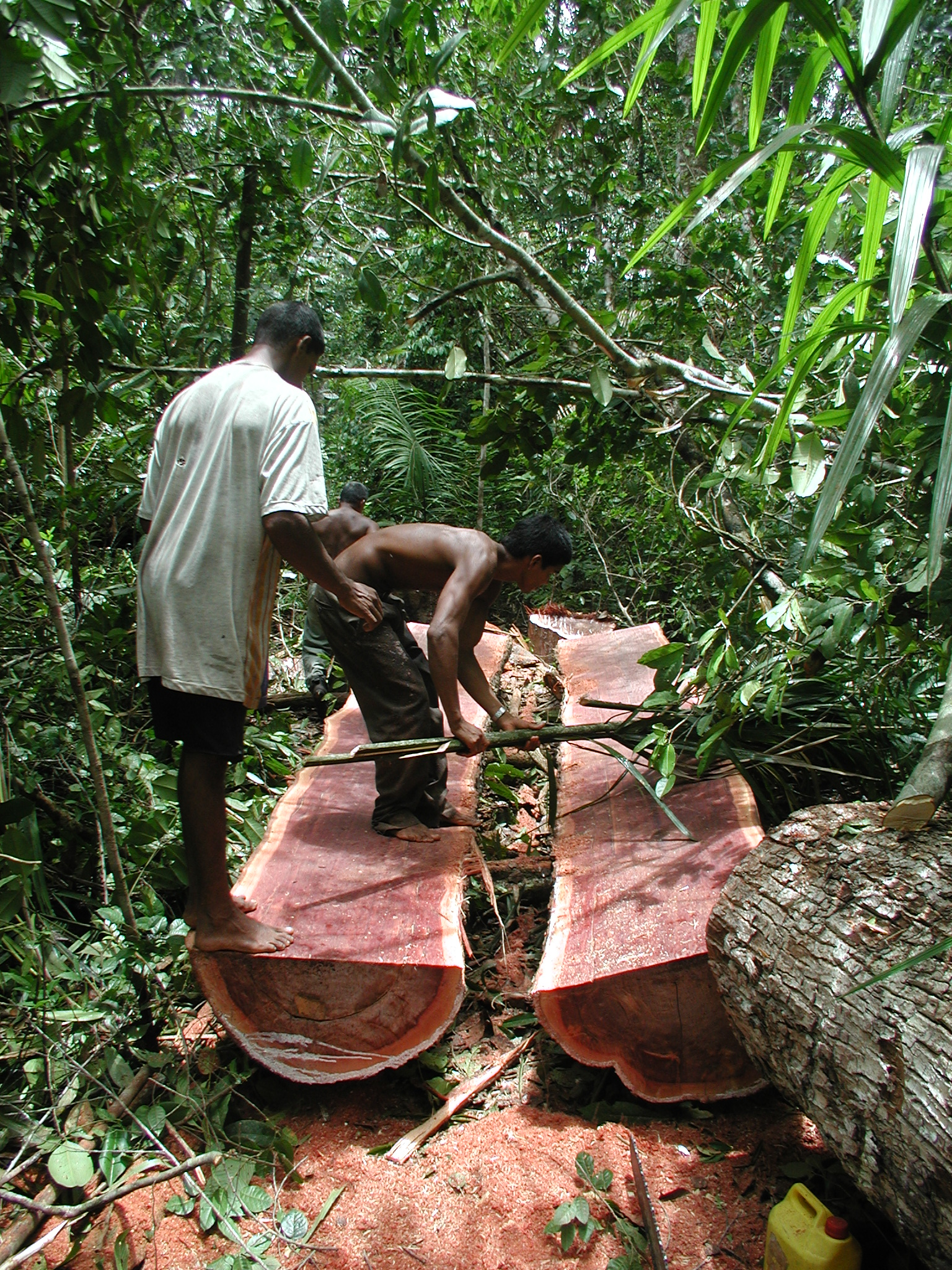

Logging has turned into a negative concept throughout many areas due to the way humans go about it. We have now relied on logging as a major contributor to our resources that it has been difficult to cut down and has turned into a negative factor. Specifically to New Zealand, there has been a 3 year ban put into place to try to conserve the environment and attempt to reconstruct the environment back to its original standards. This is because the West Taupo forest that is located in Pureora, is the last forest remaining causing a great deal of stress to preserve the land.

The most serious issues surrounding these native forests have resulted in a socio-economic consideration as well as conservation problems. While viewing this issue in another light, conservationists are claiming that logging has already made too big of an impact to turn back. In spite of the many protests and bans that have been placed, logging throughout these forests is still taking place today.

The effects of logging have also been negative on the rate of erosion throughout many places, specifically in the Philippines. Scientists have found that the rate of erosion in the Philippines has increased by four times due to conventional logging. Roads were one of the main outcomes of logging and although they only typically cover a small amount of the area being logged, they cover over 80% of the surface erosion.

=== Mining ===
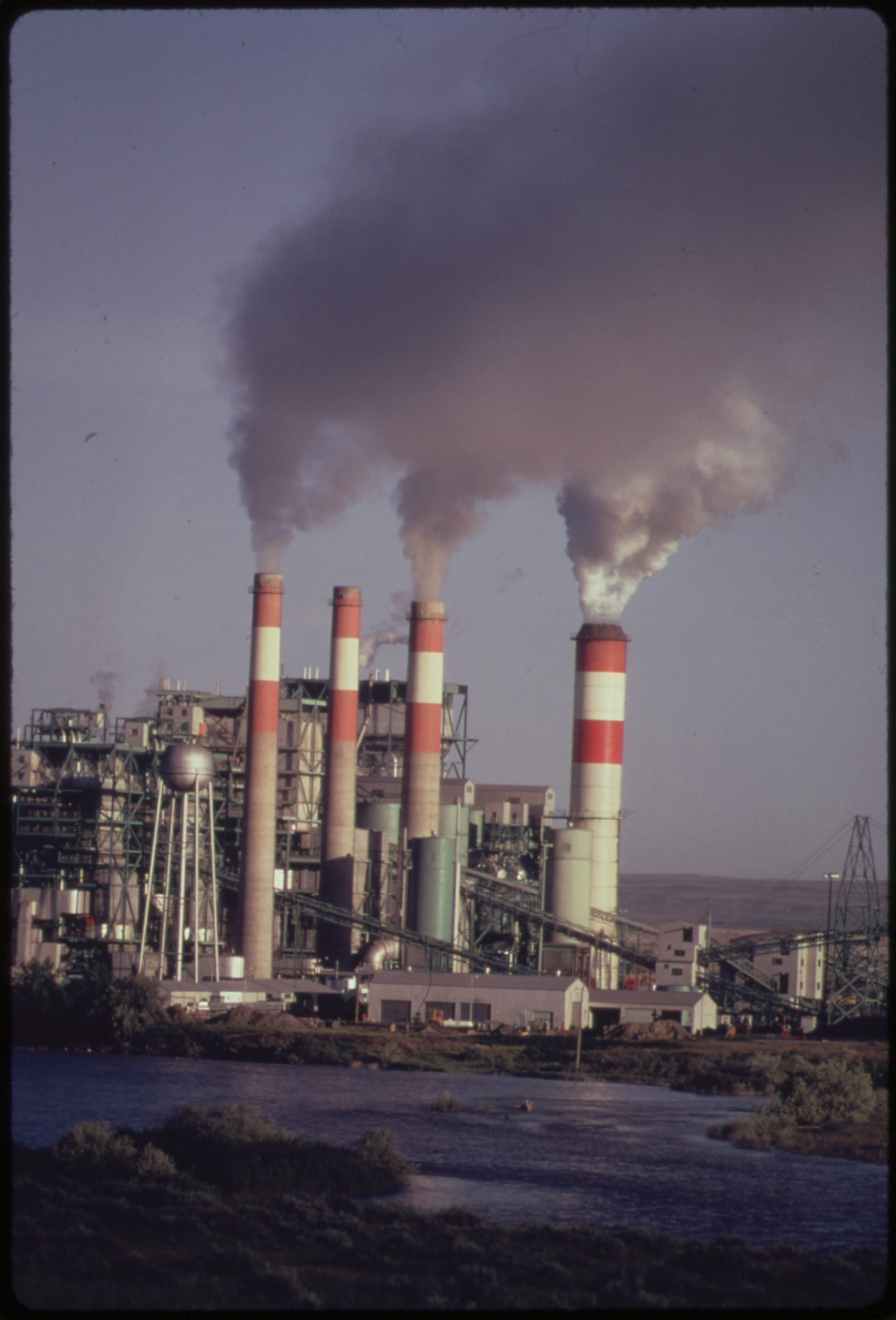

Over the course of many years, Peru specifically has been the main resources of copper, tin, silver, gold, zinc and natural gas. There has been many conflicts around labour in terms of the experience workers have prior to starting their job. Due to the high demand of workers in the mining industry, there has been a great deal of employees being hired with little to no work experience to perform these specific tasks. They are also less likely to change professions as they are being paid a large salary greater than professions that require a high deal of experience like health workers, and police officers, etc. These workers do not have any knowledge on the negative impacts that mining seems to have on the environment causing them to do more harm than good.

There has also been a weakness around environmental regulation when it comes to mining in Peru. This is seen especially through the Ministry of Energy and Mines as they are responsible for the overall production and regulations with Mining. Their responsibilities are more often neglected as their main concern is wealth as opposed to the environment.

Mining requires a great deal of site preparation and clearing at times. This can be a negative effect on the environment if they are performing this task through an ecologically sensitive area. Even prior to mining, many activities that are linked to the process of preparing the land for mining have a significantly negative effect on these sensitive areas.

A result of human labour has effected the environment in terms of habitat loss throughout wildlife. Many species have been effected from mining companies stripping the land to benefit economically. This can also be effected when the homes of these species are being polluted with the wastes that derive from mining projects. Also, in terms of lakes and ponds, the fish and wildlife found inside these streams can be impacted if they are drained or polluted.

Some say that the mining company has done more harm than good throughout many aspects of the environment, doing everything they can to gain an economic prosperity regardless of the environmental effects.

=== Tourism ===
Tourism has the ability to transform many areas into an economically beneficial project. It has become a major industry throughout all over the world regardless of the many stressors that can be contributed to the environment. Tourism can negatively effect the lives of indigenous people who may be depending on these resources to survive. When using nature as a resource for an economic benefit it negatively impact the lives of these indigenous individuals.

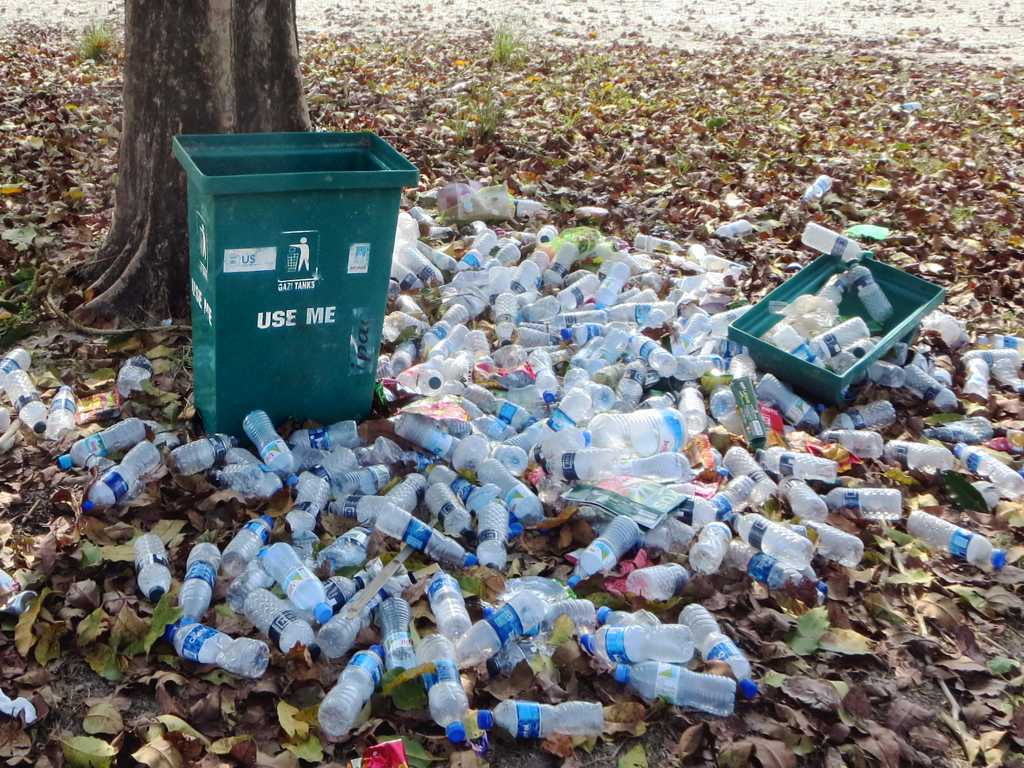

One of the major issues with tourism is the littering that tourists tend to contribute to. When tourists are littering they are not only effecting the environment but they are also effecting the animals among that ecosystem. The consumption of litter amongst these animals can result in illness and death. Not only can this factor into the land but also the organisms in the sea by breaking coral and also frightening animals or bringing illness and death among them.

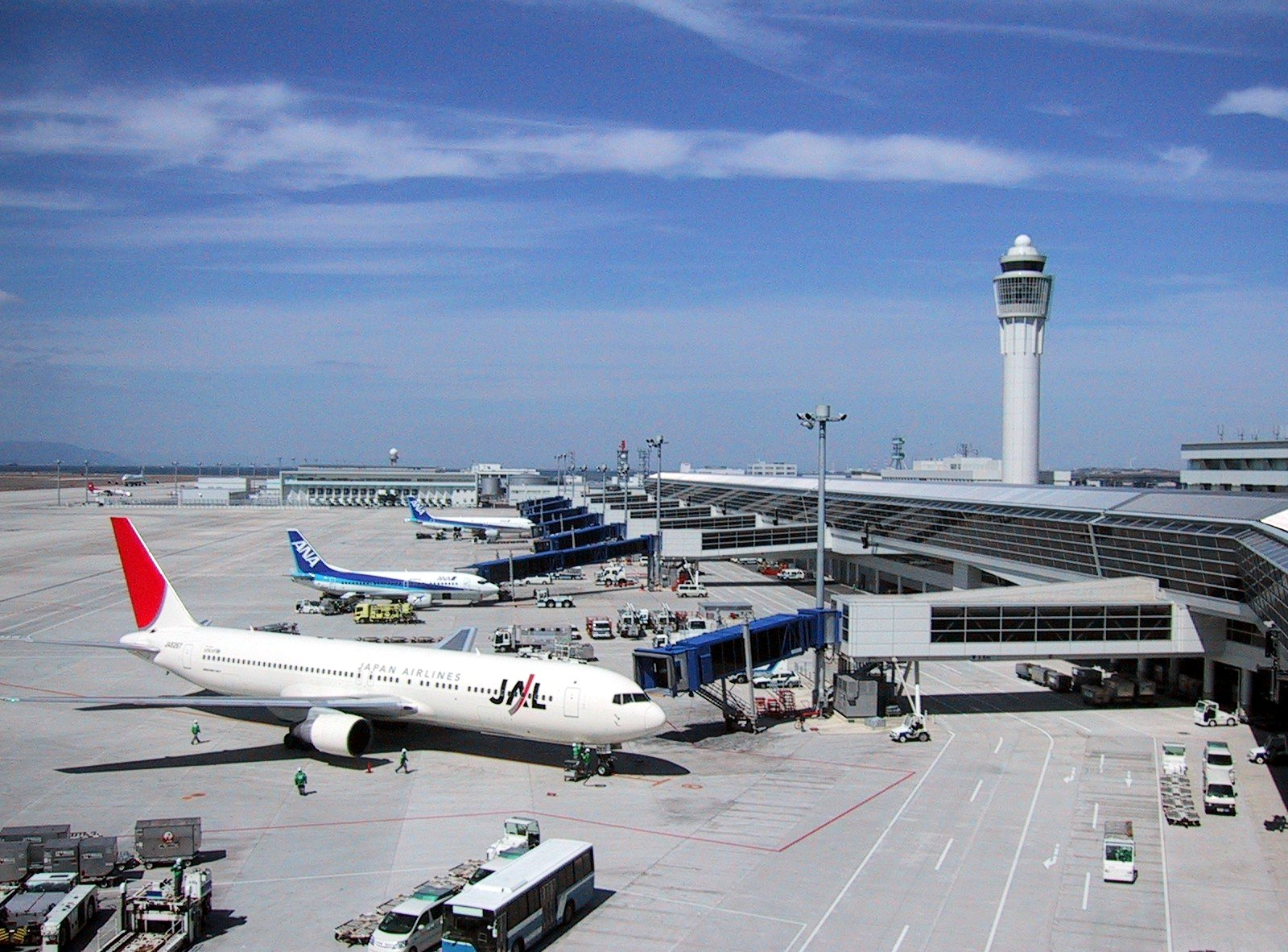

Tourism has also impacted the environment when having to expand resources for the industry to grow. Tourism can link to the effects of logging, as there have been areas torn down in order to expand economically. Spain has gained an increasing number of tourists over the years resulting in them having to expand in airports and hotels. This resource has resulted in stripping the environment to create these commodities. While using the environment to grow in the tourism industry, this demonstrates the unsustainable model being implemented in order to grow. Many resources, land and water, have been negatively effected in the process of expanding.

== Effects ==
=== Climate change ===
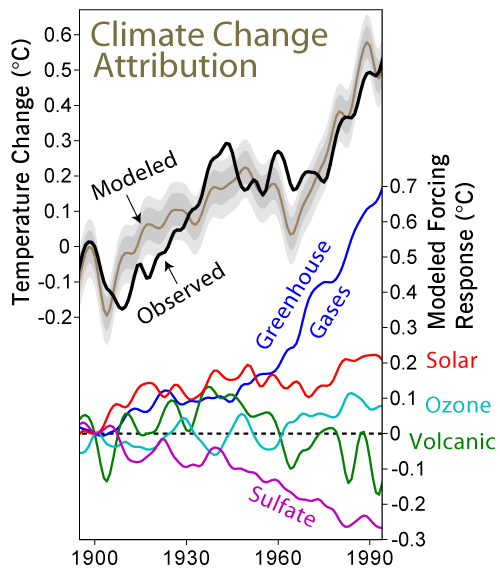

Human labour on the environment have effected many factors, one being the ongoing issue of climate change. The main attempt is to establish different routes to maintain the overall state of the environment. This is done by creating policies to try to use alternative options for energy, goods, infrastructure, etc. Certain human labour activities highly affect climate change in terms of air pollution. Jobs that require transportation, electricity generation, and industrial processes release pollution throughout the air every day. This can be through the high demand in imports and exports that require individuals to produce this pollution through their means of transporting these products.

The Global Union Research Network has worked extensively in trying to find alternative routes for services to have a smaller impact on climate change. Tourism has been affected from climate change due to the rise of sea levels causing some businesses close to the sea to shut down as a safety hazard. These policies are influenced by the strategies used when dealing with climate change and many of the financial crises.

Logging contributes to up to 15 percent of the carbon dioxide in the air. It is such a negative aspect towards the environment because when individuals are cutting down trees, they are releasing carbon out into the arm which then contributes to the greenhouse gases and global warming occurs. There has been more action taken place upon vehicles impacting the air then there is towards logging and vehicles produce about 14 percent of the carbon dioxide in the air, hinting that logging should be just as an important issue to the world. Between the years of 2000 and 2009, there were 32 million acres of tropical rainforest that had been cut down per year, and each year this rate has been increasing. Environmental Defence Fund states that unless something is done as an alternative route to logging, deforestation will release up to 200 billion tons of carbon dioxide into the air in the years coming.

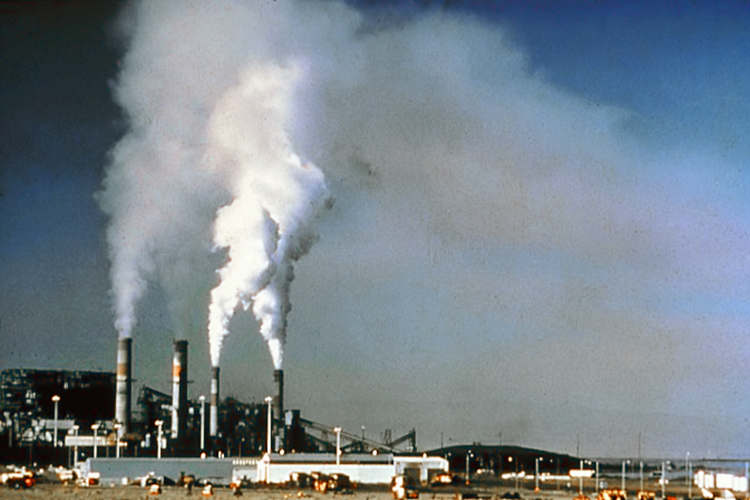

Mining has contributed to many of the air pollutions being released into the air. When mining for these resources, inexperienced employees are creating many detrimental outcomes when mining in the wrong areas or hitting gas leaks. In specifics to coal mines, communities have no choice but to leave their land behind and move due to the expansion of these mines, and the water contamination from mining. Critics claim that these companies are very quick to attain any sort of product through mining that they do not realize the great damage left behind once they have extracted what they need. Acid mine drainage for instance, is just one of the issues that can continue on for decades, as a result of a minimal mining job. Many campaigns are doing their best to ensure that communities find alternative routes to renewable energy to preserve the environment and decrease climate change.

Tourism has been greatly expanding over the years, and has also contributed a main factor of their expansion to climate change. By creating many of these new airports, attractions, etc, for tourists, it requires companies to tear down areas and rebuild a new company for the tourism industry to grow. Pollutants are being released in the air as these companies build new areas. There is a lack of knowledge around tourism and climate change which has been a leading factor in the detrimental outcomes of tourism towards the environment. Individuals continue to create new attractions for tourists to come see without realizing the consequences of their attraction towards the environment. Many individuals act out by only thinking of the short and medium term benefits of their attraction and pay no mind to the long term effects to the environment such as air pollution and overall land protection.

=== Emerging green economy ===
The emerging green economy is a way of trying to reduce resource consumption, destructive emissions, and overall reducing all types of negative impacts towards the environment. The green economy offers green products and services that benefit the environment.

When the green economy first began to grow, there were 2 different approaches being taken, environmentally and economically. The environmental approach to this was to take all the negative environmental aspects into account and develop a sustainable route to each one through pricing, and land choices, etc. The economic perspective also known as short term growth perspective; was all about increasing jobs and incomes by investing in low carbon technologies to preserve the environment. More recently there has been a third approach to the green economy, equity and inclusion. This has been brought by developing countries, wanting the green growth approach to focus primarily on individuals and countries who are not part of the economic system.

The green economy has been implemented in an attempt to preserve the environment. Policies in Limpopo, Africa, revolve around the needs of the economy and society to ensure it is maintaining its sustainable lifestyle. The Green Economy in Limpopo's main focus is to bring more jobs and increase the economy. The green economy attempts to create this lifestyle in many different countries and areas.

== See also ==
- Environmental impact of mining
- Environmental impacts of tourism in the Caribbean
- Organisation for Economic Co-operation and Development
- Green economy policies in Canada
