= List of members of the House of Representatives of the Philippines (D) =

This is a complete list of past and present members of the House of Representatives of the Philippines whose last names begin with the letter D.

This list also includes members of the Philippine Assembly (1907–1916), the Commonwealth National Assembly (1935–1941), the Second Republic National Assembly (1943–1944) and the Batasang Pambansa (1978–1986).

== Da ==
- Leoncio Dacanay, member for La Union's 2nd district (1925–1928)
- Rodriguez Dadivaz, member for Capiz's 1st district (2001–2007)
- Simeon Dadivaz, member for Capiz's 2nd district (1914)
- Sergio Dagooc, member for APEC party-list (2019–present)
- Mannix Dalipe, member for Zamboanga City's 2nd district (2016–2025)
- Maximo Dalog, member for Mountain Province (2010–2017)
- Maximo Dalog Jr., member for Mountain Province (2019–present)
- Nenita Daluz, member for Cebu (1984–1986)
- Erasmo Damasing, member for Cagayan de Oro (1992–1998)
- Samuel Dangwa, member for Benguet (1984–1986, 2001–2010), and Benguet's 2nd (1987–1995)
- Alvin Dans, member for Basilan (1987–1992)
- Francisco Dantes, member for Zambales (1943–1944)
- Francisco Datol Jr., member for Senior Citizens party-list (2017–2020)
- Hilario Davide Jr., member for Region VII (1978–1984)
- Enrico Dayanghirang, member for Davao Oriental's 1st district (1987–1992)
- Nelson Dayanghirang Sr., member for Davao Oriental's 1st district (2007–2016, 2022–2025)
- Nelson Dayanghirang Jr., member for Davao Oriental's 1st district (2025–present)
- Eugenio Daza, member for Samar's 3rd district (1907–1909)
- Niko Raul Daza, member for Northern Samar's 1st district (2025–present)
- Paul Daza, member for Northern Samar's 1st district (2007–2010, 2019–2025)
- Raul Daza, member for Northern Samar (1969–1972), and Northern Samar's 1st district (1987–1998, 2010–2013, 2016–2019)

== De ==
- Bernabe de Aquino, member for Pangasinan (1943–1944)
- Socorro de Castro, member for Region V (1978–1984)
- Alejandro de Guzman, member for Pangasinan's 3rd district (1916–1919), and Pangasinan's 2nd district (1919–1922)
- Bernabe de Guzman, member for Pangasinan's 5th district (1916–1919)
- Del de Guzman, member for Marikina (2001–2007), and Marikina's 2nd district (2007–2010)
- Eulogio de Guzman, member for La Union's 2nd district (1938–1941)
- Jose de Guzman, member for Pangasinan's 3rd district (1949–1953)
- Nicanor de Guzman Jr., member for Nueva Ecija's 4th congressional district (1987–1992)
- Roque de Guzman, member for Region I (1978–1984)
- Emmi de Jesus, member for Gabriela party-list (2010–2019)
- Presley de Jesus, member for Philreca party-list (2019–present)
- Roman de Jesus, member for Palawan (1919–1922)
- Antonio de las Alas, member for Batangas's 1st district (1922–1934)
- Vicente de Lara, member for Misamis Oriental (1919–1922)
- Ceferino de Leon, member for Bulacan's 2nd district (1912–1916)
- Fortunato de Leon, member for Bataan (1931–1934)
- Jose de Leon Jr., member for Bulacan's 2nd district (1931–1934)
- Juan de León y Benedicto, member for Iloilo's 5th district (1916–1919)
- Leonides de Leon, member for Laguna's 2nd district (1969–1972), and Region IV (1978–1984)
- Luis de Leon, member for Camarines Sur's 2nd district (1934–1935)
- Severiano de Leon, member for Catanduanes (1949–1953)
- Leila de Lima, member for ML party-list (2025–present)
- Daniel de Luna, sectoral member (1987–1992)
- Ruben de Ocampo, sectoral member (1978–1986)
- Hilario de Pedro III, member for South Cotabato (1984–1986), and South Cotabato's 2nd district (1987–1992)
- Antonio de Pio, member for Cebu's 7th district (1957–1961)
- Juan de Rodriguez, member for Pangasinan's 1st district (1946–1949)
- Isidoro de Santos, member for Manila's 1st district (1912–1916)
- Jose Maria de Valle, member for Ilocos Sur's 2nd district (1910–1912)
- Christopher de Venecia, member for Pangasinan's 4th district (2016–2025)
- Gina de Venecia, member for Pangasinan's 4th district (2010–2016, 2025–present)
- Jose de Venecia Jr., member for Pangasinan's 2nd district (1969–1972), and Pangasinan's 4th district (1987–1998, 2001–2010)
- Michael Eugene de Vera, member for ABS party-list (2016–2018)
- Felipe de Vera, member for Region I (1978–1984), and Pangasinan (1984–1986)
- Teodoro de Vera, member for Sorsogon's 2nd district (1945–1946)
- Vicente de Vera, member for Sorsogon's 1st district (1907–1909)
- Jaime C. de Veyra, member for Leyte's 4th district (1907–1912)
- Rachel del Mar, member for Cebu City's 1st district (2010–2013, 2022–present)
- Raoul del Mar, member for Cebu City's 1st district (1998–2001)
- Raul del Mar, member for Cebu City's 1st district (1987–1998, 2001–2010, 2013–2020)
- Bernardo del Mundo, member for Tayabas's 2nd district (1912–1916)
- Gregorio del Prado, sectoral member (1995–1998)
- Antonio del Rosario, member for Capiz's 1st district (2007–2016)
- Anthony del Rosario, member for Davao del Norte's 1st district (2010–2016)
- Eugenio del Rosario, member for Misamis Occidental (1945–1946)
- Monsour del Rosario, member for Makati's 1st district (2016–2019)
- P. M. Stuart del Rosario, member for Misamis Occidental (1943–1944)
- Rodolfo del Rosario, member for Region XI (1978–1984), Davao del Norte (1984–1986), and Davao del Norte's 3rd district (1987–1998)
- Tomas del Rosario, member for Bataan (1909–1912)
- Edilberto del Valle, member for Eastern Visayas (1978–1984), and Northern Samar (1984–1986)
- Jonathan dela Cruz, member for Abakada Guro party-list (2009–2010, 2013–2016)
- Servillano dela Cruz, member for Pangasinan's 3rd district (1925–1928)
- Zoilo dela Cruz Jr., sectoral member (1992–1998)
- Pedro dela Llana, member for Mindanao and Sulu (1925–1928)
- Emilio de la Paz Jr., member for Pasig–Marikina (1984–1986)
- Emilio de la Paz Sr., member for Rizal's 2nd district (1935–1941, 1945–1946, 1949–1951)
- Luciano dela Rosa, member for Manila's 2nd congressional district (1912–1916)
- Pablo dela Rosa, member for Masbate (1919–1925)
- Vicente dela Serna, member for Cebu's 6th district (1987–1992)
- Sixto de los Angeles, member for Rizal's 2nd district (1912–1916)
- Maximino delos Reyes, member for Bataan (1916–1922)
- Rustico delos Reyes Jr., member for Laguna (1984–1986)
- Alfred delos Santos, member for Ang Probinsyano party-list (2019–2025, 2025–present)
- Ceferino delos Santos, member for Iloilo (1943–1944), and Iloilo's 4th district (1945–1946)
- Arthur Defensor Sr., member for Iloilo (1984–1986), and Iloilo's 3rd district (2001–2010)
- Arthur Defensor Jr., member for Iloilo's 3rd district (2010–2019)
- Lorenz Defensor, member for Iloilo's 3rd district (2019–present)
- Matias Defensor Jr., member for Quezon City's 3rd district (2004–2010)
- Maria Theresa Defensor, member for Quezon City's 3rd district (2001–2004)
- Mike Defensor, member for Quezon City's 3rd district (1995–2001)
- Janice Degamo, member for Negros Oriental's 3rd district (2025–present)
- Temistocles Dejon Sr., sectoral member (1992–1998)
- Francisco Delgado, member for Bulacan's 1st district (1931–1935)
- Jose Delgado, member for Cebu (1943–1944)
- Jorge Delgado, member for Leyte's 3rd district (1928–1931), and Leyte's 5th district (1934–1935)
- Cheryl Deloso-Montalla, member for Zambales's 2nd district (2013–2022)
- Demetrio Demetria, member for Pangasinan (1984–1985)
- Salvador Demetrio, member for Leyte's 2nd district (1907–1909)
- Anthony Dequiña, member for Cotabato's 1st district (1992–2001)
- Roque Desquitado, member for Cebu's 7th district (1938–1941)

== Di ==
- Jiamil Ismael Dianalan, sectoral member (1978–1984)
- Omar Dianalan, member for Lanao del Sur (1984–1986), and Lanao del Sur's 1st district (1987–1992)
- Carlo Oliver Diasnes, member for Batanes (2007–2010)
- Anacleto Díaz, member for La Union's 2nd district (1909–1912)
- Antonio Diaz, member for Zambales (1969–1972, 1984–1986), and Zambales's 2nd district (1992–2001, 2004–2011)
- Domingo Diaz, member for Albay's 1st district (1912–1919)
- Felipe Diaz, member for La Union's 2nd district (1919–1922)
- Felix Diaz, member for Mountain Province (1934–1935)
- Ignacio Diaz, member for Rizal's 1st district (1946–1949)
- Leopoldo Diaz, member for Nueva Ecija's 1st district (1969–1972), Region III (1978–1984), and Nueva Ecija (1984–1986)
- Renato Diaz, member for Nueva Ecija's 1st district (1992–1998)
- Concordio Diel, member for Region X (1978–1984), and Misamis Oriental (1984–1986)
- Clementino Diez, member for Surigao (1922–1925, 1935–1938)
- Baisendig Dilangalen, member for Maguindanao's 1st district (2004–2007)
- Didagen Dilangalen, member for Maguindanao's 1st district (1995–2004, 2008–2010), and Shariff Kabunsuan (2007–2008)
- Beverley Dimacuha, member for Batangas's 5th district (2025–present)
- Arman Dimaguila, member for Biñan (2025–present)
- Gaudencio Dimaisip, member for Iloilo's 4th district (1946–1947)
- Abdullah Dimaporo, member for Region XII (1978–1984), Lanao del Norte (1984–1986), and Lanao del Norte's 2nd district (1987–1992, 2001–2010, 2013–2022)
- Aminah Dimaporo, member for Lanao del Norte's 2nd district (2022–present)
- Fatima Aliah Dimaporo, member for Lanao del Norte's 2nd district (2010–2013)
- Imelda Dimaporo, member for Lanao del Norte's 1st district (2010–2016, 2025–present)
- Macacuna Dimaporo, member for Lanao del Sur (1969–1972, 1984–1986)
- Mohammad Ali Dimaporo, member for Lanao (1949–1953, 1957), Lanao del Norte (1966–1972), and Lanao del Sur's 2nd (1987–1995)
- Mohamad Khalid Dimaporo, member for Lanao del Norte's 1st district (2016–2025)
- Jose Dimayuga, member for Batangas's 3rd district (1928–1934)
- Maximo Dimson, member for Pampanga's 1st district (1934–1935)
- Andres Dinglasan Jr., sectoral member (1992–1998)
- Lorenzo Dinlayan, member for Bukidnon (1984–1986)
- Chel Diokno, member for Akbayan party-list (2025–present)
- Ramón Diokno, member for Batangas's 1st district (1916–1919, 1931–1935)
- Roberto Diokno, member for Batangas's 1st district (1969–1972)
- Ernix Dionisio, member for Manila's 1st district (2022–present)
- Emmarie Dizon, member for Cebu's 6th district (2019–2022), and Mandaue (2022–present)
- Tomas Dizon, member for Laguna's 1st district (1922–1928, 1938–1941), and Laguna (1943–1944)

== Do ==
- Soledad Dolor, member for Region IV-A (1978–1984)
- Andrea D. Domingo, member for Pampanga's 3rd district (1992–1995)
- Danny Domingo, member for Bulacan's 1st district (2022–present)
- Jose Domingo, member for Tarlac's 2nd district (1928–1934)
- Manuel Domingo, member for Malabon–Navotas–Valenzuela (1984–1986)
- Simplicio Domingo Jr., member for Isabela (1984–1986), and Isabela's 2nd district (1987–1992)
- Josephine Dominguez, member for Mountain Province (1998–2001)
- Victor Dominguez, member for Region I (1978–1984), and Mountain Province (1984–1986, 1987–1998, 2004–2007)
- Juan Domino, elected in 1998 as member for Sarangani, but was disqualified on the issue of his residency
- Mauricio Domogan, member for Baguio (2001–2010, 2025–present)
- Jose Dorado, member for Capiz's 2nd district (1928–1941)
- Regino Dorillo, member for Iloilo's 5th district (1907–1909)
- Tereso Dosdos, member for Cebu's 1st district (1934–1935, 1938–1941)

== Dr ==
- Renato Dragon, member for Cavite (1984–1986), and Cavite's 2nd district (1987–1998)

== Du ==
- Gilberto Duavit Sr., member for Region IV-A (1978–1984), and Rizal's 1st district (1994–2001)
- Jack Duavit, member for Rizal's 1st district (2001–2010, 2016–2025)
- Joel Roy Duavit, member for Rizal's 1st district (2010–2016)
- Henry Dueñas Jr., member for Taguig (2007–2010)
- Fausto Dugenio, member for Misamis Oriental (1958–1961)
- Alan Dujali, member for Davao del Norte's 2nd district (2019–2025)
- Orlando Dulay, member for Quirino (1984–1986)
- Faysah Dumarpa, member for Lanao del Sur's 1st district (2001–2010)
- Tereso Dumon, member for Cebu's 7th district (1961–1969)
- Tomas Dumpit, member for La Union's 2nd district (1998–2007)
- Thomas Dumpit Jr., member for La Union's 2nd district (2007–2010)
- Evelyn Dunuan, confirmed by the Commission on Appointments as a sectoral member in 1995, but did not assume seat
- Gabriel Dunuan, member for Mountain Province's 3rd district (1946–1953)
- Tito Dupaya, member for Cagayan's 1st district (1984–1986)
- Benjamin Duque, member for Sultan Kudarat (1984–1986)
- Fernando Duran, member for Sorsogon's 2nd district (1931–1935)
- Josefina Duran, member for Albay's 3rd district (1961–1969)
- Pio Duran, member for Albay (1943–1944), and Albay's 3rd district (1949–1961)
- Ace Joseph Durano, member for Cebu's 5th district (1998–2004, 2013–2016)
- Ramon Durano III, member for Cebu (1984–1986), and Cebu's 5th district (1987–1998)
- Ramon Durano VI, member for Cebu's 5th district (2005–2013, 2016–2019)
- Ramon Durano, member for Cebu's 1st district (1949–1972)
- Jesus Dureza, member for Davao City's 1st district (1987–1989, 1992–1995)
- Harold James Duterte, member for PPP party-list (2025–present)
- Omar Duterte, member for Davao City's 2nd district (2025–present)
- Paolo Duterte, member for Davao City's 1st district (2019–present)
- Rodrigo Duterte, member for Davao City's 1st district (1998–2001)
- Juan Duyan, member for Mountain Province's 1st district (1957–1961, 1964–1969)

== Dy ==
- Consuelo Dy, member for Pasay (2001–2007)
- Faustino Dy III, member for Isabela's 3rd district (2001–2010), and Isabela's 6th district (2025–present)
- Mike Dy III, member for Isabela's 5th district (2019–present)
- Faustino Dy Jr., member for Isabela's 2nd district (1992–2001)
- Ian Paul Dy, member for Isabela's 3rd district (2019–present)
- Inno Dy, member for Isabela's 6th district (2019–2025)
- Napoleon Dy, member for Isabela's 3rd district (2010–2019)
