= 2016 Philippine House of Representatives elections in Northern Mindanao =

Election will be held in Northern Mindanao for seats in the House of Representatives of the Philippines on May 9, 2016.

== Summary ==
Party	Popular vote	%	Swing	Seats won	Change
BPP				1	
CDP				0	
Liberal				5	
Nacionalista				3	
NPC				2	
NUP				1	
Padayun Misamis				0	
PDP–Laban				0	
LM				0	
UNA				1	
Independent				1	
Valid votes					
Invalid votes					
Turnout					
Registered voters					

== Bukidnon ==
Each of Bukidnon's four legislative districts will elect each representative to the House of Representatives. The candidate with the highest number of votes wins the seat.

=== 1st District ===
Ma. Lourdes O. Acosta-Alba is the incumbent.

2016 Philippine House of Representatives election at Bukidnon's 1st District
Party	Candidate	Votes	%
Liberal	Ma. Lourdes Acosta-Alba	106,194	93.21%
Independent	Andrew Eligan	4,098	3.59%
Independent	Petronilo Sumampong	3,629	3.18%
Total votes		113,921	100.00%

=== 2nd District ===
Florencio T. Flores Jr is the incumbent and running unopposed.

2016 Philippine House of Representatives election at Bukidnon's 2nd District
Party	Candidate	Votes	%
Nacionalista	Florencio Flores Jr	98,164	100.00%
Total votes		98,164	100.00%

=== 3rd District ===
Jose Ma. F. Zubiri III is the incumbent but ineligible for reelection due to term limit.

2016 Philippine House of Representatives election at Bukidnon's 3rd District
Party	Candidate	Votes	%
BPP	Manuel Zubiri	129,678	90.60%
Independent	Henry Iligan	13,441	9.39%
Total votes		143,119	100.00%

=== 4th District ===
Rogelio Neil Roque is the incumbent.

2016 Philippine House of Representatives election at Bukidnon's 4th District
Party	Candidate	Votes	%
NPC	Rogelio Neil Roque	66,964	63.70%
Independent	Jemsly James Bation	36,067	34.31%
Independent	Beverly Navarro	2,088	1.98%
Total votes		105,119	100.00%

== Cagayan de Oro ==
Each of Cagayan de Oro's two legislative districts will elect each representative to the House of Representatives. The candidate with the highest number of votes wins the seat.

=== 1st District ===
Rolando Uy is the incumbent.

2016 Philippine House of Representatives election at Cagayan de Oro's 1st District
Party	Candidate	Votes	%
Liberal	Rolando Uy	57,094	52.71%
Independent	Lourdes Darimbang	51,208	47.28%
Total votes		108,302	100.00%

=== 2nd District ===
Rufus Rodriguez is the incumbent but ineligible for reelection. He is running for city mayor instead.

2016 Philippine House of Representatives election at Cagayan de Oro's 2nd District
Party	Candidate	Votes	%
Independent	Maximo Rodriguez	46,363	40.05%
UNA	Ramon Tabor	34,123	29.48%
Liberal	Edgar Cabanlas	29,343	25.35%
Independent	Evangeline Carrasco	4,905	4.23%
Independent	Chito Fernandez	507	0.43%
Independent	Celso Balat	502	0.43%
Total votes		115,743	100.00%

== Camiguin ==
Xavier Jesus D. Romualdo is the incumbent

2016 Philippine House of Representatives election at Camiguin's Lone District
Party	Candidate	Votes	%
Liberal	Xavier Jesus Romualdo	40,383	88.55%
PDP–Laban	Manuel Jaudian	5,217	11.44%
Total votes		45,600	100.00%

== Iligan City ==
Vicente Belmonte, Jr. (LP) is the incumbent. However, he is already on his last term and ineligible for reelection. Instead, he decided to run for mayor. However, he later dropped his candidacy.

2016 Philippine House of Representatives election in Iligan City
Party	Candidate	Votes	%
UNA	Frederick Siao	34,222	29.93%
NPC	Alipio Cirilo Badelles	26,267	22.97%
Liberal	Lawrence Lluch-Cruz	21,521	18.82%
CDP	Vermin Quimco	13,662	11.94%
PDP–Laban	Franklin Quijano	13,540	11.84%
Independent	Melchora Ambalong	2,378	2.07%
Independent	Uriel Borja	1,993	1.74%
Independent	Samson Dajao	381	0.33%
Independent	Luis Carrillo	363	0.31%
Total votes		124,915	100%

== Lanao del Norte ==
Each of Lanao del Norte's two legislative districts will elect each representative to the House of Representatives. The candidate with the highest number of votes wins the seat.

=== 1st District ===
Imelda D.C. Quibranza-Dimaporo is the incumbent but not seeking for reelection. She is running for governor instead. His party nominated incumbent governor Mohamad Khalid Dimaporo.

2016 Philippine House of Representatives election at Lanao del Norte's 1st District
Party	Candidate	Votes	%
Liberal	Mohamad Khalid Dimaporo	79,882	83.23%
UNA	Jo Sanguila	12,303	12.82%
Independent	Dunhill Palomares	3,781	3.93%
Total votes		95,966	100.00%

=== 2nd District ===
Abdullah D. Dimaporo is the incumbent.

2016 Philippine House of Representatives election at Lanao del Norte's 2nd District
Party	Candidate	Votes	%
NPC	Abdullah Dimaporo	80,691	68.84%
UNA	Omar Usup	36,511	31.15%
Total votes		117,202	100.00%

== Misamis Occidental ==
Each of Misamis Occidental's two legislative districts will elect each representative to the House of Representatives. The candidate with the highest number of votes wins the seat.

=== 1st District ===
Jorge T. Almonte is the incumbent.

2016 Philippine House of Representatives election at Misamis Occidental's 1st District
Party	Candidate	Votes	%
Liberal	Jorge Almonte	83,501	69.37%
Nacionalista	Marina Clarete	36,868	30.62%
Total votes		120,369	100.00%

=== 2nd District ===
Henry S. Oaminal is the incumbent and running unopposed.

2016 Philippine House of Representatives election at Misamis Occidental's 2nd District
Party	Candidate	Votes	%
Nacionalista	Henry S. Oaminal	115,833	100.00%
Total votes		115,833	100.00%

== Misamis Oriental ==
Each of Misamis Oriental's two legislative districts will elect each representative to the House of Representatives. The candidate with the highest number of votes wins the seat.

=== 1st District ===
Peter M. Unabia is the incumbent.

2016 Philippine House of Representatives election at Misamis Oriental's 1st District
Party	Candidate	Votes	%
Liberal	Peter Unabia	117,027	70.12%
Padayun Misamis	Rey Moreno	48,367	28.98%
LM	Rommel Zagado	1,495	0.89%
Total votes		166,889	100.00%

=== 2nd District ===
Juliette Uy is the incumbent.

2016 Philippine House of Representatives election at Misamis Oriental's 2nd District
Party	Candidate	Votes	%
NUP	Juliette Uy	139,830	62.97%
Padayun Misamis	Jun Baculio	79,392	35.75%
Independent	Manuel Po	2,833	1.27%
Total votes		222,055	100.00%
