= Lanao =

Lanao in geography may refer to:

- Lanao (province), defunct province of the Philippines from 1914 to 1959
- Lanao del Norte, present province in the Northern Mindanao region
- Lanao del Sur, present province in the Autonomous Region in Muslim Mindanao (ARMM)
- Lake Lanao, second largest lake in the Philippines

== Other ==
- Legislative district of Lanao, the representation of the former province before it was divided in 1959
