= Sultan Muliloda Datumulok =

Filipino politician

Sultan Muliloda Macarangcat Datumulok Dimaporo

Chairman of the 28 Royal Legislative Sultanates of Ranao
- Succeeded by: Sultan Ansary Pacalna Maongco

Sultan of the Sultanate of Binidayan
- Preceded by: Sultan Dimalna
- Succeeded by: Sultan Abdullah Dimaporo Datumulok

Municipal Mayor of the Municipality of Binidayan
- In office 2 February 1988 – 8 May 1995
- Preceded by: Hadji Halim Datumulok Dimaporo
- Succeeded by: Punudaranao Benito Datumulok
- In office 14 November 1961 – 2 May 1986
- Preceded by: Omar Olama
- Succeeded by: Hadji Halim Datumulok Dimaporo

Personal details
- Born: 15 March 1935 Binidayan, Lanao, Philippine Commonwealth
- Died: March 2013 (aged 77–78) Cagayan de Oro, Philippines
- Party: Nacionalista (1965-1972; 1987-1995); KBL (1978–1986)
- Spouse: Bae Ominsalam B. Benito-Datumulok Bae Erlinda Candia Bae Cadidia Amerol
- Occupation: Politician

Sultan Muliloda Macarangcat Datumulok Dimaporo (15 March 1935 – 14 March 2013) was a noted politician and scion of many principalities in the Province of Lanao del Sur (Tagalog: Lalawigan ng Lanao del Sur), in the Autonomous Region in Muslim Mindanao (ARMM) in the Philippines.

During his incumbency, he received various leadership and recognition awards from the government and non-government organizations for his exemplary services and performance as a local chief executive of Binidayan.

== Family ==
Sultan Muliloda was born in the Sultanate of Binidayan to Datumulok Mangotara and Bae Lopac Macarangcat, a royal couple variably descended from the founding ancestors Sayawa, Pondag and Ampaso of Binidayan.

His father Datumulok Mangotara descended from Amai Bayora Clan of Binidayan and Amerol sa Wato Clan. While his mother, Bai Lopac Macarangcat is one of the daughters of the Sultan of Binidayan, Sultan Macarangcat who also descended from lineages of Diwan of Bayang and Dianaton of Butig.

He was married to Bae Ominsalam Marohomsalic Benito-Datumulok, daughter of the Sultan of Pagayawan, Sultan Hadji Acob "Orangot" Benito (brother of the Sultan of Maguindanao Pangadapun Benito), and Hadja Sara Balindong Marohomsalic.

Under the Philippine Muslim law, Muslim males are allowed to marry up to four wives. With this, Sultan Muliloda married Bae Erlinda Candia and Bae Cadidia Amerol as his second and third wives respectively during his late mayor incumbency days.

The sultan and his wives were parents of several children:

- Saphidaon Datumulok-Camid
- Aisah Datumulok-Andig
- Former Binidayan Mayor Punudaranao Datumulok
- Raidah Datumulok-Gani
- Former Pagayawan Mayor Anwar Datumulok
- Normidah Datumulok-Guro
- Khadaphie Datumulok
- Junaidah Datumulok-Balt
- Omaidah Datumulok-Radia
- Mohammad Cosary Datumulok
- Hamidah Datumulok
- Sahabodin Datumulok
- Asanie Datumulok
- Salman Datumulok
- Hayanidah Datumulok
- Asmin Datumulok

Most of Sultan Muliloda's family members were also into politics, such as his cousins former Lanao del Sur and Lanao del Norte Governor and Congressman Mohammad Ali Dimaporo, former Lanao del sur Congressman Macacuna Dimaporo, former Karomatan (now Sultan Naga Dimaporo) Mayor Naga Dimaporo, former Magsaysay Mayor Abdul Rashid Dimaporo, former Marogong Mayor Abdulmadid Maruhom, his brothers are former Binidayan-OIC Mayor Halim Datumulok Dimaporo, former Bumbaran Mayor Sharief Datumulok Dimaporo, former Marogong Mayor Jamil Datumulok Dimaporo, his children are former Binidayan Mayor Punudarano Benito Datumulok and former Pagayawan Mayor Anwar Benito Datumulok, and his nephews and nieces are former Lanao del Norte Governor Abdullah Dimaporo, former Lanao del Sur Board Member Tolawidan "Danny" Dimaporo, former Sultan Naga Dimaporo Mayor Motalib Dimaporo, former Tubaran Mayor Raidah Dimaporo Papandayan, former Pantao-a-Ragat Mayor Eleanor Dimaporo Lantud, former Binidayan Mayor Aman Misbac Datumulok, former Binidayan Mayor Abdullah Datumulok and many more.

== Political life ==
Sultan Muliloda was the first reigning Sultan of Binidayan to be elected concurrently as the Municipal Mayor of the Municipality of Binidayan from 1961- 1995.

He also concurrently reigned as the Chairman of the 28 Royal Legislative Sultanates of Ranao (Dowa-polo ago walo a Mbabaya ko taritib) which serves as the lower chamber of the legislative branch of the Ranao Sultanate.

The title of "Sultan of Binidayan" and other royal sultanate titles in the Philippines are only a de facto royal titles since the Republic of the Philippine is a democratic country, and it does no longer recognize the old Sultanate system of the Muslim Filipinos.

Despite this, Muslim Filipinos continued to recognize and abide the old and limited Sultanate system of government in their civil or common law and in some criminal law cases within the Muslim Filipino region.

Sultan Muliloda's political stunt started when he was convinced by his cousin Governor Ali Dimaporo to run on the 1961 Philippine general election for the Mayoralty position of the town of Binidayan against his relative, then-incumbent Mayor Omar Olama. After a hard-fought election, he won the said election and started his more than 30-year rule in the town.

During the Marcos era, he joined the Kilusan ng Bagong Lipunan Party of President Marcos and actively supported the programs and projects of the Marcos Administration.

Under the leadership of his cousin, Lanao del Sur Governor Ali Dimaporo, and together with his family members Karomatan Mayor Naga Dimaporo, Marogong Mayor Abdulmadid Maruhom, Department of Agrarian Reform (Philippines) Regional Director Monib Dimaporo and Lanao del Sur Congressman Macacuna Dimaporo, they were able to dominate the political landscape of the province of Lanao del Sur during the 70s and early 80s.

Due to his political connections and influences, he was able to orchestrate the election of his younger brothers Datu Sharief Datumulok Dimaporo and Datu Jamil Datumulok Dimaporo as Municipal Mayors of the Municipalities of Bumbaran and Marogong respectively.

After the People Power, all then incumbent elective officials have been removed from their respective posts. As a result, one of his brothers, Hadji Halim Datumulok Dimaporo, was named as the officer-in-charge Mayor of the municipality of Binidayan.

A year after his removal from office, Sultan Muliloda reclaimed his old post as Municipal Mayor when he won in the 1988 Philippine local elections.

Upon the establishment of Autonomous Region in Muslim Mindanao, he was instrumental for the victory of his eldest son-in-law Datu Ismael B.R. Camid as Assemblyman of the then-newly established Regional Legislative Assembly of ARMM representing the 2nd legislative district of Lanao del Sur.

In 1995, he retired from politics and instead fielded his eldest son Punudaranao Datumulok to be his successor-municipal Mayor of the town of Binidayan.

In 1998, he supported his second son Datu Anwar Datumulok's bid for the Mayoralty position of the Municipality of Pagayawan.

But on 2001, he surprised his relatives and supporters when he ran and challenged his son then-Binidayan Mayor Punudaranao Datumulok and his nephew Datu Aman Misbak Datumulok for the mayoralty position of Binidayan. Unfortunately, due to his old age, Sultan Muliloda failed to reclaim his old post and as a result, he permanently retired from politics thereafter.

In the 2010 Philippine general election he played a huge role in the Binidayan Mayoralty victory of his nephew, Abdullah Datumulok.

In 2012, Sultan Muliloda's last political activity is his political endorsement for the Binidayan Mayoralty candidacy of his son-in-law, Dimnatang Radia for the then-upcoming 2013 Philippine general election.

He was known for being a sincere, gallant and approachable leader for his constituents. He was a well-known leader throughout the entire province of Lanao del Sur and its neighboring provinces of Lanao del Norte, Maguindanao del Norte, and Maguindanao del Sur due to his efforts in resolving numerous cases of inter-clan feuds or "rido".

During his incumbency as the Mayor of Binidayan, he was able to transform the small and idle town of Binidayan into the center of commerce, industry and education in the Unayan (highland area) district of Lanao when he dedicatedly pushed the implementation of various essential government projects and programs in the municipality of Binidayan, including the Unayan District Hospital, Binidayan Public Market, lake ports and the establishment of the Mindanao State University-Binidayan Community High School.

== Life after politics ==
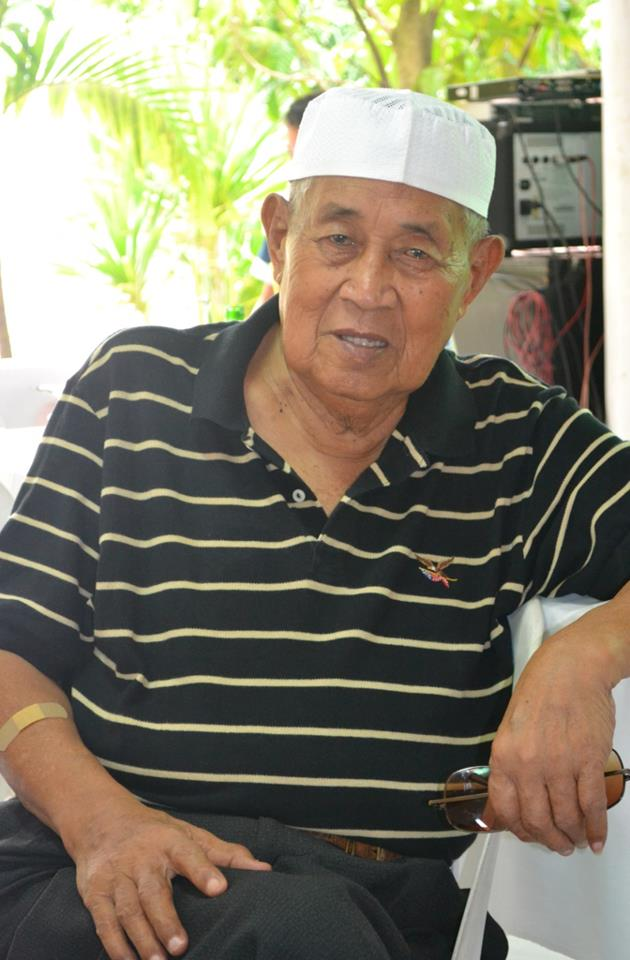
Sultan Muliloda in January `2013

After retiring from politics, Sultan Muliloda continued his mandate as the Sultan of Binidayan and Chairman of the 28 Royal Legislative Sultanates of Ranao (Duwa-polo ago walo a Mbabaya ko Taritib).

But on 2010, he was diagnosed with kidney disease which later on prompted him to abdicate his throne on the year 2011 as Chairman of the 28 Royal Legislative Sultanates of Ranao (Duwa-polo ago walo a Mbabaya ko Taritib) and Sultan of Binidayan.

== Death and burial ==
In March 2013, Sultan Muliloda was admitted to Polymedic Medical Plaza in Cagayan de Oro for his regular kidney dialysis, but was subsequently rushed to the Intensive Care Unit (ICU) of the same hospital and succumbed to death due to cardiac arrest.

He was buried at his hometown at Pagalamatan Binidayan Lanao del Sur.
