= Lanao del Norte's at-large congressional district =

Legislative district of the Philippines

Lanao del Norte's at-large congressional district is an obsolete congressional district that encompassed the entire territory of Lanao del Norte in the Philippines. It was represented in the House of Representatives from 1961 to 1972 and in the Batasang Pambansa from 1984 to 1986. The province of Lanao del Norte was created as a result of the division of Lanao in 1959 and elected its first representative provincewide at-large during the 1961 Philippine House of Representatives elections. Laurentino Lluch Badelles who served as representative of Lanao's at-large congressional district during the partition was elected as this district's first representative. The district remained a single-member district until the dissolution of the lower house in 1972. It was later absorbed by the multi-member Region XII's at-large district for the national parliament in 1978. In 1984, provincial and city representations were restored and Lanao del Norte returned one member for the regular parliament with a separate representation created for its highly urbanized city of Iligan. The district was abolished following the 1987 reapportionment that established two districts in the province under a new constitution.

== Representation history ==
#	Image	Member	Term of office		Congress	Party	Electoral history
#	Image	Member	Start	End	Congress	Party	Electoral history
=== Lanao del Norte's at-large district for the House of Representatives of the Philippines ===
District created May 22, 1959.
1		Laurentino Ll. Badelles	December 30, 1961	December 30, 1965	5th	Nacionalista	Redistricted from Lanao's at-large district and re-elected in 1961.
2		Mohammad Ali B. Dimaporo	December 30, 1965	September 23, 1972	6th	Liberal	Elected in 1965.
2		Mohammad Ali B. Dimaporo	December 30, 1965	September 23, 1972	7th	Nacionalista	Re-elected in 1969. Removed from office after imposition of martial law.
District dissolved into the eight-seat Region XII's at-large district for the Interim Batasang Pambansa.
#	Image	Member	Term of office		Batasang Pambansa	Party	Electoral history
#	Image	Member	Start	End	Batasang Pambansa	Party	Electoral history
=== Lanao del Norte's at-large district for the Regular Batasang Pambansa ===
District re-created February 1, 1984.
3		Abdullah D. Dimaporo	July 23, 1984	March 25, 1986	2nd	KBL	Elected in 1984.
District dissolved into Lanao del Norte's 1st and 2nd districts.

== See also ==
- Legislative districts of Lanao del Norte
