= Tomas Cabili =

Filipino lawyer, journalist, educator, and assemblyman

The Honorable Tomás Cabili
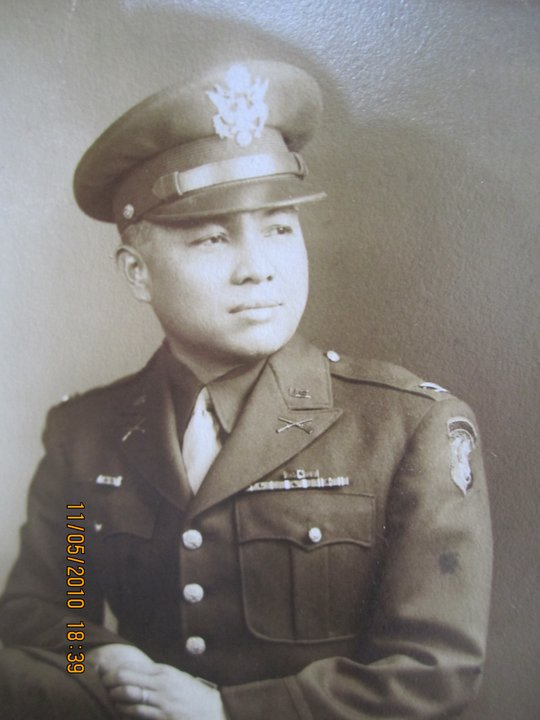
- Cabili as an Army Officer

Secretary of National Defense and Communications
- In office February 27, 1945 – July 11, 1945
- Appointed by: Sergio Osmeña
- Preceded by: Basilio Valdes
- Succeeded by: Alfredo Montelibano Sr.

Senator of the Philippines
- In office May 25, 1946 – December 30, 1955

Senate Majority Leader
- In office February 21, 1949 – January 25, 1954
- President: Manuel Roxas; Elpidio Quirino
- Preceded by: Vicente Francisco
- Succeeded by: Cipriano Primicias Sr.

Member of the National Assembly from Lanao's Lone District
- In office November 15, 1935 – December 30, 1941
- Preceded by: Post created
- Succeeded by: Bato Ali; Ciriaco B. Raval

Personal details
- Born: Tomás Lluisma Cabili; March 7, 1903 Iligan, Misamis, Philippine Islands
- Died: March 17, 1957 (aged 54) Balamban, Cebu, Philippines
- Party: Liberal (1949–1957)
- Other political affiliations: Nacionalista (1934–1949)
- Education: University of the Philippines Cebu College (BA); Philippine College of Law (LLB)
- Occupation: Lawyer, journalist, educator, assemblyman

Military service
- Allegiance: Philippines; United States
- Branch/service: United States Army
- Years of service: 1942-1945
- Rank: Colonel
- Unit: USAFFE
- Battles/wars: World War II

Tomás Lluisma Cabili (March 7, 1903 – March 17, 1957) was a Filipino lawyer, journalist, educator, and assemblyman from Lanao. He was also known as "Sultan Dimasangkay-ko-Ranao" for Maranaos.

== Early life ==
Cabili was born in Iligan, Misamis, on March 7, 1903, to Guillermo Cabili and Efifania H. Lluisma.

He studied at Iligan Primary School (1911–1915) and Iligan Elementary School (1915–1918). He enrolled in four different schools to complete his secondary education from 1919 to 1923: the Zamboanga Provincial High School (1919–1920), Cebu High School (1920–1921), Silliman Institute (1921–1922), and Cebu Provincial High School (1922–1923).

He received his Bachelor of Arts degree from the University of the Philippines Cebu College in 1925, then pursued a law course at the Visayan Institute, also in Cebu, from 1925 to 1927. He transferred to the Philippine College of Law, where he completed his Bachelor of Laws degree in 1929. After he graduated, he became an instructor in the College of Law and Liberal Arts of the Visayan Institute from 1929 to 1930.

During his early years of school he won the Osmeña Medal in an oratorical contest, and the first prize Jocson Medal in an annual debate in the Philippine Law School.

== Journalism ==
Cabili was a reporter of The Advertiser (Note: The Advertiser is a Cebu-based newspaper established in 1912.) and later a member of the staff of Cebu's The Freeman from 1924 to 1926. He was a correspondent of the National News Service between 1930 and 1932, and again from 1933 up to his election to the First National Assembly, and as a Lanao correspondent for the DMIM Papers and The Graphic.

After he passed the bar examinations, he practiced law in his home province.

== Political career ==
In 1934, Cabili he was appointed Justice of the Peace of the 17th Municipal District of Lanao and Acting Justice of the Peace of Dansalan, Lanao. In the same year, he became a delegate to the Constitutional Convention. He was the only delegate who did not sign the 1935 Philippine Constitution, which was ratified on February 8, 1935.

In the 1935 general elections, he was elected assemblyman for his district in the First National Assembly. He served on the committees on agriculture, codes, franchises, provincial and municipal government, the national language, public instruction, Mindanao and special provinces, appropriations, civil service, and public lands.

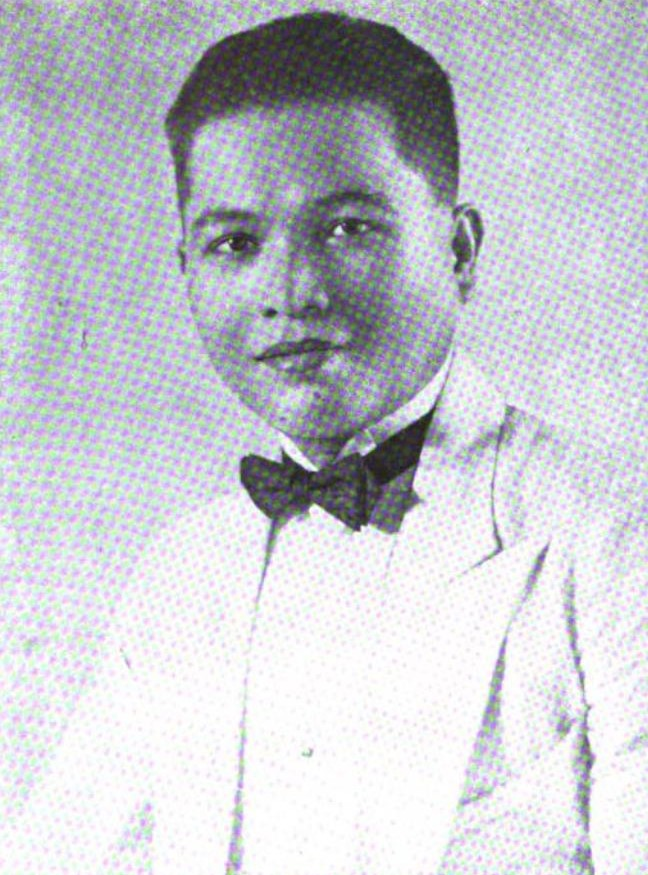
Photograph from The Commercial & Industrial Manual of the Philippines, 1941

In 1938, he was re-elected to the Second National Assembly. He was later appointed chairman of the Committee on Privileges and a member of the committees on agriculture, appropriations, forest, Mindanao and Special provinces, and national companies.

He was part of the guerrilla resistance movement during the 1942–1945 Japanese occupation.

He had a short stint as Secretary of National Defense and Communications from February 27 to July 11, 1945, under Sergio Osmeña. He was later elected to the Senate in 1946 placing on Top 12. He was reelected in 1949 and served until 1955.

== Death ==
Cabili died along with President Ramon Magsaysay and 23 others in a plane crash on March 17, 1957, at Mount Manunggal in Balamban, Cebu.

== Legacy ==
- A barangay in Iligan City was renamed from Barangay Tominobo Proper to Barangay Tomas L. Cabili on March 16, 1982.
- A Philippine Constabulary camp (now Philippine National Police office) in Barangay Tipanoy, Iligan City is named after him.

== Notes ==
House of Representatives of the Philippines
New district	Assemblyman from Lanao's Lone District; 1935–1941	Succeeded by Bato Ali
Government offices
Preceded by Basilio Valdes	Secretary of National Defense and Communications; 1945	Succeeded by Alfredo Montelibano, Sr. as Secretary of National Defense and the Interior
Senate of the Philippines
Preceded by Melecio Arranz	Majority leader of the Senate of the Philippines; 1946–1953	Succeeded by Cipriano Primicias
