= Governor of Lanao del Norte =

Local chief executive

Provincial Governor of Lanao del Norte
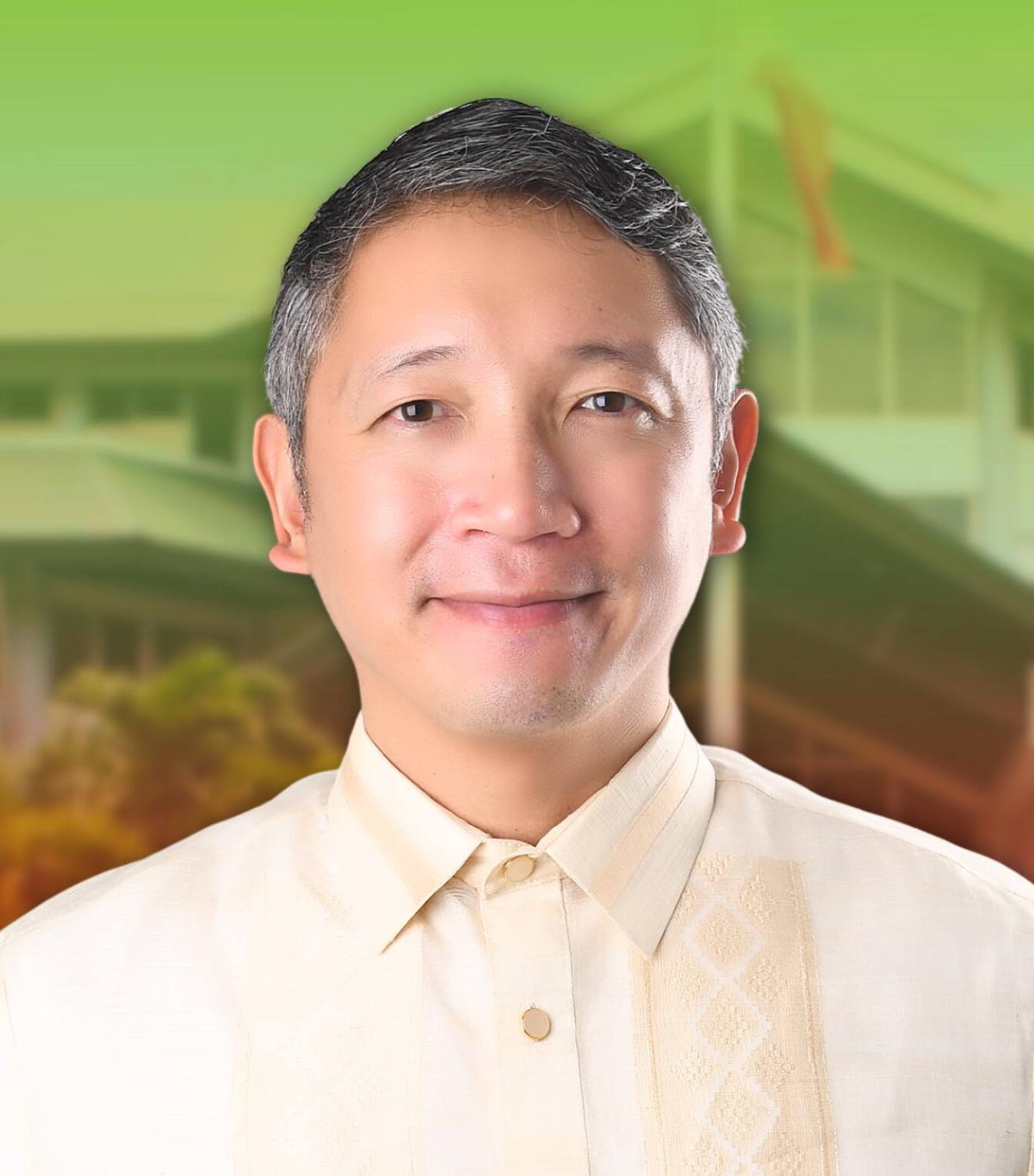
- Incumbent; Mohamad Khalid Dimaporo since June 30, 2025
- Appointer: Elected via popular vote
- Term length: 3 years
- Inaugural holder: Salvador Lluch
- Formation: 1959

The governor of Lanao del Norte (Filipino: Punong Panlalawigan ng Lanao del Norte), is the chief executive of the provincial government of Lanao del Norte.

== Provincial Governors ==
No.	Image	Governor	Term
1		Salvador T. Lluch	1959-1960
2		Mohammad Ali Dimaporo	1960-1965
3		Arsenio A. Quibranza	1965-1986
4		Francisco L. Abalos	1986-1992
5		Abdullah D. Dimaporo	1992-1998
6		Imelda Quibranza-Dimaporo	1998-2007
7		Mohamad Khalid Q. Dimaporo	2007-2016
8		Imelda Quibranza-Dimaporo	2016-2025
9		Mohamad Khalid Q. Dimaporo	2025-present
