= Lanao del Sur's at-large congressional district =

Legislative district of the Philippines

Lanao del Sur's at-large congressional district is an obsolete congressional district that encompassed the entire territory of Lanao del Sur in the Philippines. It was represented in the House of Representatives from 1961 to 1972 and in the Regular Batasang Pambansa from 1984 to 1986. The province of Lanao del Sur was created as a result of the division of Lanao in 1959 and elected its first representative provincewide at-large during the 1961 Philippine House of Representatives elections. Rasid Lucman was elected as this district's first representative. The district remained a single-member district until the dissolution of the lower house in 1972. It was later absorbed by the multi-member Region XII's at-large district for the national parliament in 1978. In 1984, provincial and city representations were restored and Lanao del Sur returned two members for the regular parliament. The district was abolished following the 1987 reapportionment that established two districts in the province under a new constitution.

== Representation history ==
#	Term of office		Congress	Single seat							
#	Start	End	Congress	Image	Member	Party	Electoral history				
=== Lanao del Sur's at-large district for the House of Representatives of the Philippines ===
District created May 22, 1959 from Lanao's at-large district.
1	December 30, 1961	December 30, 1969	5th		Rashid Lucman	Liberal	Elected in 1961.				
1	December 30, 1961	December 30, 1969	6th		Rashid Lucman	Liberal	Re-elected in 1965.				
–	December 30, 1969	June 24, 1970	7th	vacant		–	Electoral protest by Lucman delayed proclamation of 1969 elections winner.				
2	June 24, 1970	September 23, 1972	7th		Macacuna Dimaporo	Nacionalista	Declared winner of 1969 elections. Removed from office after imposition of martial law.				
District dissolved into the eight-seat Region XII's at-large district for the Interim Batasang Pambansa.
#	Term of office		Batasang Pambansa	Seat A				Seat B			
#	Start	End	Batasang Pambansa	Image	Member	Party	Electoral history	Image	Member	Party	Electoral history
=== Lanao del Sur's at-large district for the Regular Batasang Pambansa ===
District re-created February 1, 1984.
–	July 23, 1984	March 25, 1986	2nd		Omar M. Dianalan	KBL	Elected in 1984.		Macacuna Dimaporo	KBL	Elected in 1984.
District dissolved into Lanao del Sur's 1st and 2nd districts.

== See also ==
- Legislative districts of Lanao del Sur
