= Lanao's at-large congressional district =

Legislative district of the Philippines

Lanao's at-large congressional district may refer to several instances when a provincewide at-large district was used for elections to Philippine national legislatures from the undivided province of Lanao.

The single-member district was first created ahead of the 1935 Philippine legislative election following the 1934 constitutional convention where voters had been selected in electing a delegate for the province. Lanao had been admitted as a special province under the Department of Mindanao and Sulu since 1914 but was only previously represented through a multi-member delegation appointed by the Governor General covering all of Mindanao territory except Misamis and Surigao beginning in 1916. The district encompassed the entire territory formerly known as the Lanao District that was previously organized under Moro Province in 1903 from the same Spanish politico-military district (Distrito Septimo de Lanao) that existed since the late 19th century.

Tomás Cabili of the Nacionalista Demócrata Pro-Independencia was elected as the district's first representative in 1935 by a select group of electors composed of municipal and municipal district presidents, vice-presidents and councilors, among others. The first time a representative from the province was elected through popular vote was during the succeeding 1938 Philippine legislative election after the passage of Commonwealth Act No. 44 in 1936 which removed the restrictions on qualified voters in the former Bureau of Non-Christian Tribes-designated jurisdiction.

Lanao was also represented in the Second Republic National Assembly by two members during the Pacific War. It reverted to single-member representation for the restored Commonwealth and subsequent Third Republic House of Representatives. It continued to elect representatives until it was made obsolete by the 1959 division of Lanao into two provinces with separate congressional districts beginning in 1961.

== Representation history ==
#	Term of office		National Assembly	Single seat							
#	Start	End	National Assembly	Image	Member	Party	Electoral history				
=== Lanao's at-large district for the National Assembly (Commonwealth of the Philippines) ===
District created February 8, 1935 from Mindanao and Sulu's at-large district.
1	September 16, 1935	December 30, 1941	1st		Tomás Cabili	Nacionalista; Demócrata Pro-Independencia	Elected in 1935.				
1	September 16, 1935	December 30, 1941	2nd		Tomás Cabili	Nacionalista	Re-elected in 1938.				
#	Term of office		National Assembly	Seat A				Seat B			
#	Start	End	National Assembly	Image	Member	Party	Electoral history	Image	Member	Party	Electoral history
=== Lanao's at-large district for the National Assembly (Second Philippine Republic) ===
District re-created September 7, 1943.
–	September 25, 1943	February 2, 1944	1st		Bato Ali	KALIBAPI	Elected in 1943.		Ciriaco B. Raval	KALIBAPI	Appointed as an ex officio member.
#	Term of office		Common wealth Congress	Single seat				Seats eliminated			
#	Start	End	Common wealth Congress	Image	Member	Party	Electoral history	Seats eliminated			
=== Lanao's at-large district for the House of Representatives of the Commonwealth of the Philippines ===								Seats eliminated			
District re-created May 24, 1945.								Seats eliminated			
2	June 9, 1945	May 25, 1946	1st		Salvador T. Lluch	Nacionalista	Elected in 1941.	Seats eliminated			
#	Term of office		Congress	Single seat				Seats eliminated			
#	Start	End	Congress	Image	Member	Party	Electoral history	Seats eliminated			
=== Lanao's at-large district for the House of Representatives of the Philippines ===								Seats eliminated			
3	May 25, 1946	December 30, 1949	1st		Manalao A. Mindalano	Nacionalista	Elected in 1946.	Seats eliminated			
4	December 30, 1949	December 30, 1953	2nd		Mohammad Ali B. Dimaporo	Liberal	Elected in 1949.	Seats eliminated			
5	December 30, 1953	December 30, 1955	3rd		Domocao Alonto	Nacionalista	Elected in 1953. Resigned on election as senator.	Seats eliminated			
–	December 30, 1955	May 21, 1957	3rd	vacant		–	No special election held to fill vacancy pending result of electoral protest against Alonto.	Seats eliminated			
(4)	May 21, 1957	December 30, 1957	3rd		Mohammad Ali B. Dimaporo	Liberal	Declared winner of 1953 elections.	Seats eliminated			
6	December 30, 1957	December 30, 1961	4th		Laurentino Ll. Badelles	Nacionalista	Elected in 1957. Redistricted to Lanao del Norte's at-large district.	Seats eliminated			
District dissolved into Lanao del Norte's and Lanao del Sur's at-large districts.								Seats eliminated			

== See also ==
- Legislative districts of Lanao del Norte
- Legislative districts of Lanao del Sur
