= Rashid Lucman =

Filipino legislator, journalist, World War II guerilla hero (1924–1984)

The Honorable Rashid Lucman
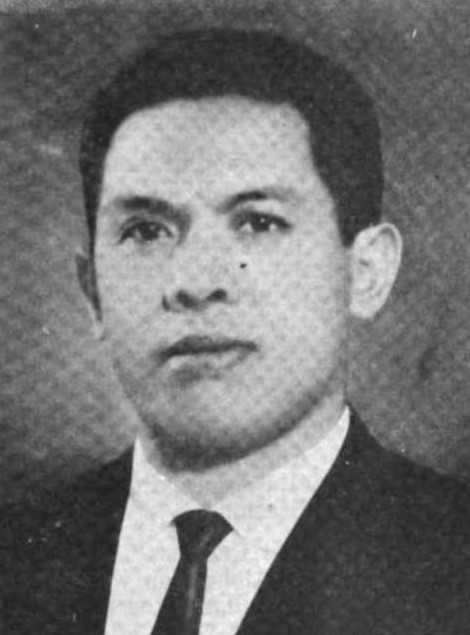
- Representative Lucman's official portrait during the 6th Congress.

Member of the Philippine House of Representatives from Lanao del Sur's Lone district
- In office December 30, 1965 – December 30, 1969
- Preceded by: Office established
- Succeeded by: Macacuna Dimaporo

Deputy Governor of Lanao
- In office 1944–1949

Personal details
- Born: Haroun al-Rashid Lucman; June 23, 1924 Bayang, Lanao, Philippine Islands
- Died: July 21, 1984 (aged 60) Riyadh, Saudi Arabia
- Party: Liberal
- Spouse: Tarhata Alonto (m. 1951) (1st Marriage Bai Linang)
- Occupation: Legislator, journalist, regional leader
- Known for: Sultan of Bayang; Sultan Paramount of Minsupala
- Awards: Honored at the Bantayog ng mga Bayani wall of remembrance

Haroun al-Rashid Lucman (June 23, 1924 – July 21, 1984) was a Filipino legislator, journalist, World War II guerilla hero, and an early proponent of Moro independence or autonomy.

As congressional representative of Lanao del Sur, he is best remembered for calling for the impeachment of Ferdinand Marcos in 1968 as a result of the President's role in the Jabidah Massacre, in which government troops massacred 68 Tausug military trainees. When the congress could not muster enough support for the impeachment, Lucman grew convinced that Muslim Mindanao needed to become independent, and founded the Bangsamoro Liberation Organization (BMLO), which later merged with the Moro National Liberation Front.

After Marcos declared Martial Law, Lucman went into self-exile in Saudi Arabia in 1976 and worked closely with opposition Senator Ninoy Aquino to push proposals of autonomy for the Moro people. Lucman's health began to fail soon after he learned of the assassination of Ninoy Aquino, and he died less than a year later in Riyadh in 1984 – before the establishment of the Autonomous Region in Muslim Mindanao in 1989 under Aquino's widow President Corazon Aquino.

His son, Haroun Alrashid Alonto Lucman Jr., was eventually elected as vice governor of the Autonomous Region in Muslim Mindanao in 2013 and 2016, and held the position until the 2019 Bangsamoro Autonomous Region creation plebiscite, which proposed the abolition of the ARMM in favor of a new Bangsamoro Autonomous Region.

== Career during World War II ==
At the outset of World War II in the Philippines, Lucman fought alongside the US Armed Forces in the Far East (USAFFE). After the surrender of US forces in the Philippines, Lucman organized the first guerrilla force in Mindanao, engaging in numerous battles against the Japanese Imperial forces.

== Political career ==
Because of his war record, Lucman was appointed deputy governor for Lanao del Sur in 1944, serving until 1949 when he left to work as correspondent for the Manila Chronicle. He returned to politics in 1953, then served as regional development officer of the Convention on National Integration at Marawi City from 1959 to 1961. In 1961 he was elected congressman of Lanao del Sur in 1961, serving until 1969.

== Lucman's call to impeach Marcos ==
Lucman was serving in congress on 18 March 1968, when the Jabidah massacre took place. The Marcos administration had gathered a group of Tausug recruits for an operation called "Project Merdeka" (merdeka being the Malay "freedom"). The military began training them on the island of Corregidor to form a secret commando unit called "Jabidah," which would destabilize and take over Sabah. The trainees eventually rejected their mission, for reasons that are still debated by historians today. Whatever the reasons behind their objections, all but one of the recruits were killed. The survivor, Jibin Arula, escaped with a gunshot to his leg and was able to tell his story to the press. In Lanao del Sur, Domocao Alonto established the Ansar El Islam (Helpers of Islam) along with Sayyid Sharif Capt. Kalingalan Caluang, Salipada Pendatun, Hamid Kamlian, Udtog Matalam, and Atty. Macapantun Abbas Jr. Accordingly, "it is a mass movement for the preservation and development of Islam in the Philippines".

When opposition senator Benigno Aquino Jr. came out with an exposé alleging that Marcos was ultimately culpable for Jabidah, Lucman called for Congress to begin proceedings to impeach President Marcos. When his proposal didn't get enough congressional support, he became convinced that Muslims should rule themselves in Muslim Mindanao – a conviction he continued to hold after the end of his term as congressman in 1969.

== After Congress ==
In 1971, he joined Senator Mamintal Tamano, Congressman Ali Dimaporo, Congressman Salipada Pendatun, University of the Philippines College of Arts and Sciences Dean Cesar Adib Majul, Delegate Ahmad Alonto, Commissioner Datu Mama Sinsuat, and Mayor Aminkadra Abubakar to form the Islamic Directorate of the Philippines.

Libyan dictator Muammar Gaddafi donated funds to the Directorate to purchase land in Tandang Sora, Quezon City for the construction of a mosque.

== Martial Law and self-exile ==
In 1972, with the declaration of martial law by President Ferdinand Marcos, Lucman fled to the Middle East.

== Ninoy Aquino and Moro autonomy discussions ==
In exile, Lucman worked with opposition leader Benigno Aquino Jr. Aquino began discussing plans for Moro autonomy with Lucman, as an alternative to full Moro independence.

In 1983, it was Lucman who helped Aquino circumvent an order from Malacañang Palace forbidding Aquino the issuance of a passport so Aquino could come home to the Philippines from exile in Boston. Lucman obtained a passport for Aquino with the alias "Marcial Bonifacio" (taken from martial law and Fort Bonifacio, where Aquino was once detained).

Rashid Lucman was married to Tarhata Alonto-Lucman, the daughter of Alauya Alonto, the Maranao Sultan of Ramain. She was elected governor of Lanao del Sur in 1971, serving until Marcos removed her from her post in 1975. She lived on for several decades after her husband, eventually dying on February 26, 2021. However, Rashid Lucman was first married to Bai Linang Datu-Dacula Lucman, his cousin, with Rashid Lucman’s first born, Bai Nomanayao Lucman Balt. After the death of his first wife, he contracted another marriage with a Syrian woman which started the Kuzbari-Lucman lineage with Rashid Lucman's second born, Bai Rohanifa Monaoray Kuzbari Lucman-Derogongan. From another union (mother undisclosed), Rashid Lucman had a son, Atty. Halil Al Rashid Lucman, who was born on December 17, 1947. Rashid and Tarhata had seven children, namely: Aminullah, Bai Normalah, Norodin, Aminodin, Salahuddin, Lorraine, and Haroun Alrashid Alonto Lucman Jr.

== Death ==
The shock of Ninoy Aquino's assassination took its toll on Lucman's health, and he died the following year in Riyadh. It was 1984 – before the establishment of the Autonomous Region in Muslim Mindanao in 1989 under Aquino's widow President Corazon Aquino.

== Legacy ==
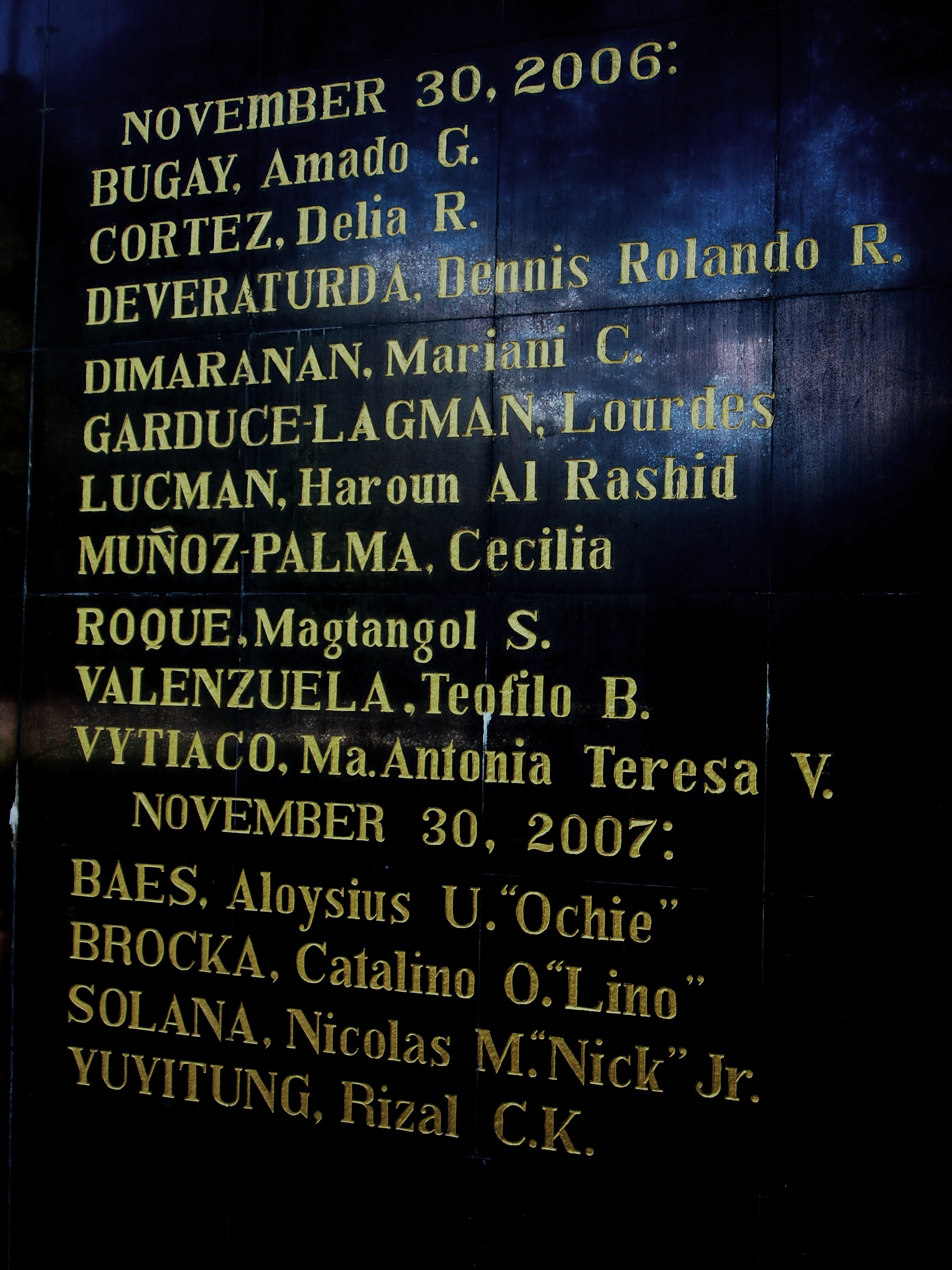
Section of the wall of remembrance at the Bantayog ng mga Bayani in Quezon City, listing those who fought against the Marcos dictatorship.

- In 2006, his name was inscribed on the Wall of Remembrance at the Bantayog ng mga Bayani in Quezon City.
- A Masonic Lodge was established under the name of Sultan Haroun Al-Rashid M. Lucman Memorial Lodge No. 406 in 2013 and operating under the jurisdiction of the Most Worshipful Grand Lodge of Free and Accepted Masons of the Philippines.

== See also ==
- Lanao del Sur
- Jabidah Massacre
- Martial Law under Ferdinand Marcos
- Moro National Liberation Front
- Benigno Aquino Jr.
- Autonomous Region in Muslim Mindanao
