= Aminah Dimaporo =

Filipino politician (born 1986)

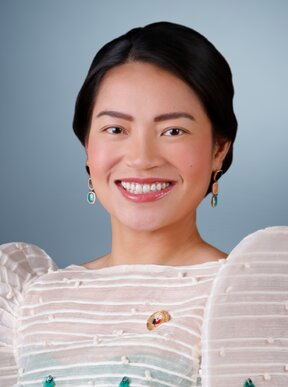
- Official portrait, 2025

Member of the Philippine House of Representatives from Lanao del Norte's 2nd District
- Incumbent
- Assumed office June 30, 2022
- Preceded by: Abdullah D. Dimaporo

Personal details
- Born: Sittie Aminah Quibranza Dimaporo; August 27, 1986 (age 40) San Juan, Metro Manila, Philippines
- Party: Lakas (2021–present)
- Spouse: Ulwan Dimaporo
- Relations: Fatima Aliah Dimaporo (sister); Mohamad Khalid Dimaporo (brother); Mohammad Ali Dimaporo (grandfather)
- Parent(s): Abdullah D. Dimaporo (father); Imelda Dimaporo (mother)

Sittie Aminah Quibranza Dimaporo (born August 27, 1986) is a Filipino politician who is a member of the House of Representatives. She represents Lanao del Norte's 2nd congressional district since 2022.

== See also ==
- List of female members of the House of Representatives of the Philippines
- 19th Congress of the Philippines
- 20th Congress of the Philippines
