= Legislative districts of Lanao =

Legislative District of the Philippines

The legislative district of Lanao was the representation of the historical province of Lanao in the various national legislatures of the Philippines until 1969. Marawi (formerly Dansalan) and Iligan also remained part of the province's representation even after becoming chartered cities in 1940 and 1950, respectively.

The undivided province's representation encompassed what are now the highly urbanized city of Iligan, and the provinces of Lanao del Norte and Lanao del Sur.

== History ==
Initially being excluded from representation in the lower house of the Philippine Legislature in 1907, the then-non-Christian-majority areas of the Philippines — which included the Department of Mindanao and Sulu, of which Lanao was part — were finally extended legislative representation with the passage of the Philippine Autonomy Act in 1916 by the United States Congress. The Revised Administrative Code (Act No. 2711) enacted on 10 March 1917 further elaborated on the manner by which these areas would be represented. The non-Christian areas were to be collectively represented in the upper house's 12th senatorial district by two senators, both appointed by the Governor-General. Five assembly members, also appointed by the Governor-General, were to represent the seven component provinces of Department of Mindanao and Sulu — Agusan, Bukidnon, Cotabato, Davao, Lanao, Sulu and Zamboanga — in the lower house as a single at-large district.

These arrangements remained in place despite the abolition of the Department in 1920. It lasted until 1935, when each of the seven provinces was provided a single representative to the National Assembly of the Philippines, albeit the manner of election varying between provinces. Voters of the more Christianized provinces of Agusan, Bukidnon, Davao and Zamboanga could elect their representative through popular vote by virtue of Article VI, Section 1 of the 1935 Constitution. In the Muslim-dominated provinces of Cotabato, Lanao and Sulu, however, voter qualifications were more restrictive: the only persons allowed to vote for the province's representative were past and present municipal officials (municipal president, vice-president, municipal councilors); present senators, assembly representatives and 1935 Constitutional Convention delegates; provincial governors and members of provincial boards; and any persons currently residing in the concerned province who held any of the aforementioned positions in the past. This was the manner by which Lanao's representative was elected in 1935.

The 1st National Assembly of the Philippines passed Commonwealth Act No. 44 on 13 October 1936 to finally give all qualified voters of Lanao (along with Cotabato and Sulu) the right to elect their own representatives through popular vote. Voters in Lanao Province began to elect their representatives in this manner beginning in 1938. Even after Dansalan became a chartered city in 1940 by virtue of Commonwealth Act No. 592, it remained part of the province's representation.

During the Second World War, the Province of Lanao sent two delegates to the National Assembly of the Japanese-sponsored Second Philippine Republic: one was the provincial governor (an ex officio member), while the other was elected through a provincial assembly of KALIBAPI members during the Japanese occupation of the Philippines. Upon the restoration of the Philippine Commonwealth in 1945 the province retained its pre-war lone district. For the duration of the war, Dansalan was annexed to the province and was not represented separately like other chartered cities at the time.

Upon the restoration of the Philippine Commonwealth in 1945 Lanao Province and Dansalan City (later renamed Marawi in 1956) retained their combined pre-war lone congressional district. After receiving its own city charter by virtue of Republic Act No. 525 on 16 June 1950, Iligan also remained part of the representation of the Province of Lanao.

The enactment of Republic Act No. 2228 on 22 May 1959 divided the old Lanao Province into Lanao del Norte and Lanao del Sur, and provided them each with a congressional representative. In accordance with Section 8 of R.A. 2228, the incumbent representative of Lanao Province, Laurentino Badelles, continued to represent both successor provinces until the next election in 1961.

== Lone District (defunct) ==
- includes Dansalan (Marawi) (chartered in 1940) and Iligan (chartered in 1950)

Period	Representative
1st National Assembly; 1935–1938	Tomas Cabili
2nd National Assembly; 1938–1941	Tomas Cabili
1st Commonwealth Congress; 1941–1946	Salvador T. Lluch
1st Congress; 1946–1949	Manalao Mindalano
2nd Congress; 1949–1953	Mohammad Ali B. Dimaporo
3rd Congress; 1953–1957	Domocao Alonto^{1}
3rd Congress; 1953–1957	vacant
3rd Congress; 1953–1957	Mohammad Ali B. Dimaporo^{2}
4th Congress; 1957–1961	Laurentino Ll. Badelles

^1Lost election protest to Mohammad Ali Dimaporo after already having been elected in 1955 to the Senate.
^2Assumed seat on 21 May 1957 after winning election protest against Domocao Alonto; served for the remainder of the 3rd Congress.

== At-Large (defunct) ==
- includes the chartered city of Dansalan

Period	Representatives
National Assembly; 1943–1944	Datu Bato Ali
National Assembly; 1943–1944	Ciriaco B. Razul (ex officio)

== See also ==
- Legislative district of Mindanao and Sulu
- Legislative district of Lanao del Norte
  - Legislative district of Iligan
- Legislative district of Lanao del Sur
