= Shariff Kabunsuan's at-large congressional district =

Legislative district of the Philippines

Shariff Kabunsuan's at-large congressional district was a short-lived congressional district that encompassed the entire province of Shariff Kabunsuan in the Philippines. It was created ahead of the 2007 Philippine House of Representatives elections following the passage of Muslim Mindanao Autonomy Act No. 201 on September 6, 2006 and its subsequent ratification by the 2006 Shariff Kabunsuan creation plebiscite. The province of Shariff Kabunsuan, now defunct, covered the whole territory of Maguindanao's 1st congressional district including Cotabato City. It elected Didagen P. Dilangalen of the Pwersa ng Masang Pilipino (PMP) as its first and only representative with the district having been made obsolete by the 2008 Supreme Court decision nullifying the new province and reverting its territory to the province of Maguindanao.

== Representation history ==
| # | Image | Member | Term of office | | Congress | Party | Electoral history |
| # | Image | Member | Start | End | Congress | Party | Electoral history |
|---|---|---|---|---|---|---|---|
=== Shariff Kabunsuan's at-large district for the House of Representatives of the Philippines ===
District created September 6, 2006 from Maguindanao's 1st district.
| 1 | | Didagen Dilangalen | June 30, 2007 | July 16, 2008 | 14th | PMP | Elected in 2007. Redistricted to Maguindanao's 1st district. |
District dissolved into Maguindanao's 1st district.

== See also ==
- Legislative districts of Maguindanao
