= Mohamad Khalid Dimaporo =

Filipino economist and politician (born 1980)

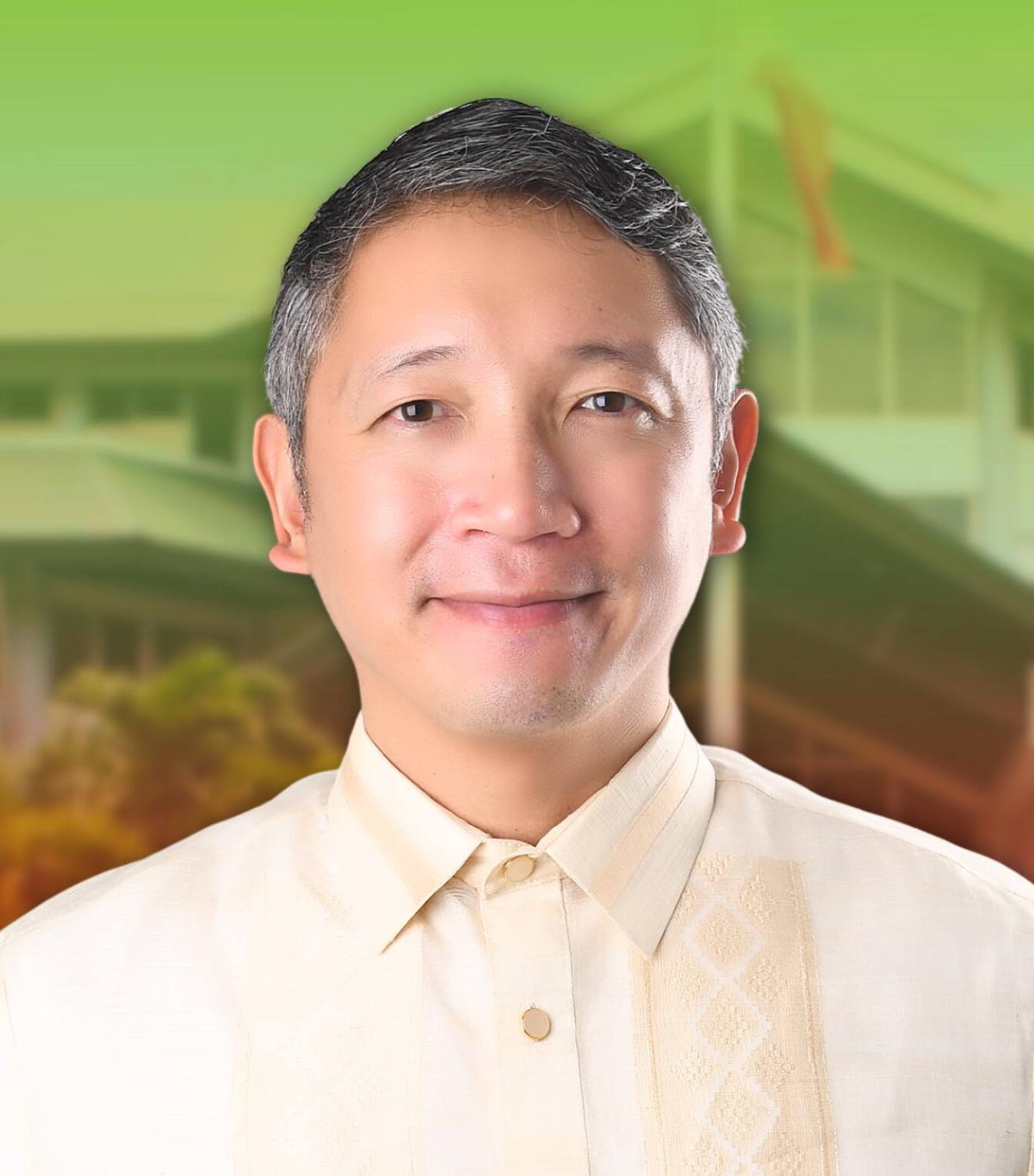
- Official portrait, 2026

7th and 9th Governor of Lanao del Norte
- Incumbent
- Assumed office June 30, 2025
- Vice Governor: Allan Lim
- Preceded by: Imelda Dimaporo
- Succeeded by: Imelda Dimaporo
- In office June 30, 2007 – June 30, 2016
- Vice Governor: Irma Ali (2007–2013); Ma. Cristina Atay (2013–2016)
- Preceded by: Imelda Dimaporo
- Succeeded by: Imelda Dimaporo

Member of the Philippine House of Representatives from Lanao del Norte's 1st District
- In office June 30, 2016 – June 30, 2025
- Preceded by: Imelda Dimaporo
- Succeeded by: Imelda Dimaporo

Personal details
- Born: Mohamad Khalid Quibranza Dimaporo; February 16, 1980 (age 46) San Juan, Metro Manila, Philippines
- Party: Lakas (2007–2010; 2023–present); UNLAD (local party; 2024–present)
- Other political affiliations: PDP–Laban (2016–2023); Liberal (2015–2016); NPC (2010–2015)
- Spouse: Christina Kahanding
- Relations: Aminah Dimaporo (sister); Fatima Aliah Dimaporo (sister); Mohammad Ali Dimaporo (grandfather)
- Parent(s): Abdullah D. Dimaporo (father); Imelda Dimaporo (mother)
- Education: University of San Francisco (BA) (MA); Texas A&M University (PhD)

Mohamad Khalid Quibranza Dimaporo (born February 16, 1980) is a Filipino economist and politician. He is currently serving as governor of Lanao del Norte since 2025; he previously served in the same position from 2007 to 2016. He represented the 1st district of Lanao del Norte from 2016 to 2025.

== Early life and education ==
Dimaporo was born on February 16, 1980, in San Juan, Metro Manila to Abdullah "Bobby" Dimaporo and Imelda Quibranza.

He studied Bachelor of Arts in International Economics at the University of San Francisco in 2002. He pursued his master's degree in Development Economics at the same university in 2003. He finished his doctoral degree in Agricultural Economics at the Texas A&M University in 2004.

== Political career ==
=== Governor of Lanao del Norte (2007–2016) ===
Dimaporo was elected as governor of Lanao del Norte from 2007 to 2016, he served for three consecutive terms.

=== House of Representatives (2016–2025) ===
In 2016, Dimaporo was elected as representative for the first district of Lanao del Norte for three consecutive terms after he succeeded his mother.

=== Return to Governor of Lanao del Norte (2025–present) ===
In the 2025 elections, Dimaporo returned as governor of Lanao del Norte.

== Personal life ==
Dimaporo is married to Christina Mendoza Kahanding and has seven children.

His grandfather, Arsenio Quibranza, was also served as governor of Lanao del Norte from 1965 to 1986.

== Electoral history ==
Electoral history of Mohamad Khalid Dimaporo
| Year | Office | Party | | Votes received | | | | Result |
| Year | Office | Local | National | Total | % | P. | Swing | Result |
|---|---|---|---|---|---|---|---|---|
| 2007 | Governor of Lanao del Norte | —N/a | Lakas | 129,714 | 63.40% | 1st | —N/a | Won |
| 2010 | Governor of Lanao del Norte | —N/a | Lakas | 205,267 | 87.15% | 1st | —N/a | Won |
| 2013 | Governor of Lanao del Norte | —N/a | NPC | 137,475 | 59.91% | 1st | —N/a | Won |
| 2025 | Governor of Lanao del Norte | UNLAD | Lakas | 258,853 | 90.28% | 1st | —N/a | Won |
| 2016 | Representative (Lanao del Norte–1st) | —N/a | Liberal | 79,882 | 83.23% | 1st | —N/a | Won |
| 2019 | Representative (Lanao del Norte–1st) | —N/a | PDP–Laban | 88,951 | —N/a | 1st | —N/a | Won |
| 2022 | Representative (Lanao del Norte–1st) | —N/a | PDP–Laban | 108,498 | 87.87% | 1st | —N/a | Won |
