= Didagen Dilangalen =

Filipino politician from Mindanao (1954–2021)

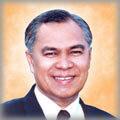

Member of the Philippine House of Representatives from Maguindanao
- In office June 30, 2007 – June 30, 2010
- Preceded by: Position created
- Succeeded by: Position abolished
- Constituency: Shariff Kabunsuan's at-large (2007–2008); 1st District (2008–2010)
- In office March 26, 1996 – June 30, 2004
- Preceded by: Michael Mastura
- Succeeded by: Bai Sendig G. Dilangalen
- Constituency: 1st District

Personal details
- Born: Didagen Piang Dilangalen; January 8, 1954 Mindanao, Philippines
- Died: November 6, 2021 (aged 67)
- Party: PMP (1995–2021)
- Occupation: Politician
- Profession: Lawyer

Didagen "Digs" Piang Dilangalen (January 8, 1954 – November 6, 2021) was a Filipino human rights lawyer and politician formerly represented Maguindanao's 1st District. In 2001, after serving as President Joseph Estrada's defense counsel for his impeachment trial, Dilangalen was a major participant in the EDSA III protests that led to an attempt by Estrada supporters to storm Malacañang Palace.

== Legal career ==
Dilangalen was notable to assist for Sarah Balabagan's case in 1997, which she is almost executed for killing her employer due to employer's attempt to rape her.

== Political career ==
Dilangalen became a congressman representing Maguindanao's 1st District from 1995 to 2004. He ran for senate under FPJ's Koalisyon ng Nagkakaisang Pilipino in 2004 senatorial elections, but lost.

He was notable for protesting the result of the election while canvassing the election results at the Batasang Pambansa in Quezon City. He also threw an outburst, as his request to punish the woman who sent him the note while he was speaking on the floor was denied by other members of the house. The scene was played all over news outlets' programs on national television. In the said scene, he was notable for addressing Deputy Speaker Raul Gonzalez of "Shut up, Mr. Speaker".

He then decided to retire from politics after the loss, and served as then-detained former president Joseph Estrada's spokesperson.

But, he later ran for a spot for newly created Shariff Kabunsuan's at-large district, in 2007. The said district was returned to its former name (Maguindanao del Norte Lone District) in 2008 due to the nullification of the creation of Shariff Kabunsuan.

== Personal life ==
He was portrayed by Menggie Cobarrubias in the 1997 film The Sarah Balabagan Story.

He died on November 6, 2021, at 67 years old.
