= Fatima Aliah Dimaporo =

Filipino politician

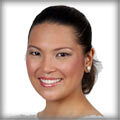
- Official portrait, 2010

Member of the Philippine House of Representatives from Lanao del Norte's 2nd District
- In office June 30, 2010 – June 30, 2013
- Preceded by: Abdullah D. Dimaporo
- Succeeded by: Abdullah D. Dimaporo

Personal details
- Born: Fatima Aliah Quibranza Dimaporo
- Party: NPC (2009–present)
- Relations: Mohamad Khalid Dimaporo (brother); Aminah Dimaporo (sister); Mohammad Ali Dimaporo (grandfather)
- Parent(s): Abdullah D. Dimaporo (father); Imelda Dimaporo (mother)

Fatima Aliah Quibranza Dimaporo is a Filipino politician who is a member of the House of Representatives. She represented Lanao del Norte's 2nd congressional district from 2010 to 2013.

In 2023, she was appointed Undersecretary at the Department of Social Welfare and Development.

== See also ==
- List of female members of the House of Representatives of the Philippines
- List of representatives elected in the 2010 Philippine House of Representatives election
