= Macacuna Dimaporo =

Filipino politician

Datu Macacuna Dimaporo
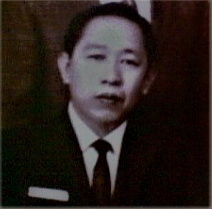

Speaker pro tempore of the Batasang Pambansa
- In office March 13, 1985 – March 25, 1986
- Speaker: Nicanor Yñiguez
- Preceded by: Salipada Pendatun
- Succeeded by: Antonio Cuenco (as speaker pro tempore of the House of Representatives)

Member of the Batasang Pambansa from Lanao del Sur
- In office June 30, 1984 – March 25, 1986 Serving with Omar Dianalan

Member of the House of Representatives from Lanao del Sur's at-large district
- In office June 24, 1970 – January 17, 1973
- Preceded by: Rashid Lucman
- Succeeded by: District abolished (seat next held by himself and Omar Dianalan in the Regular Batasang Pambansa)

Personal details
- Born: Macacuna Borngao Dimaporo
- Party: Nacionalista (1969–1978); KBL (from 1978)
- Profession: Lawyer

Datu Macacuna Borngao Dimaporo was a Filipino lawyer and politician. He served in the House of Representatives during the 7th Congress as the representative for Lanao del Sur from 1969 until the imposition of martial law in 1972.

== Career ==
Liberal Party candidate Rasid Lucman challenged Dimaporo's victory in the 1969 House elections before the Commission on Elections (COMELEC) on allegations of irregularities in several election returns from Lanao del Sur. The dispute was elevated to the Supreme Court in 1970 in Lucman v. Dimaporo, which dismissed Lucman's petition and upheld COMELEC's actions, affirming Dimaporo's election.

After his congressional term, he joined Mindanao State University as a consultant during the tenure of his elder brother, former Lanao del Sur governor Mohammad Ali Dimaporo, who served as the institution's acting president.

In 1984, Dimaporo was elected to the Regular Batasang Pambansa representing Lanao del Sur, serving until 1986. In March 1985, he was elected speaker pro tempore following the death of Salipada Pendatun in January of the same year.

Political offices
Preceded by Salipada Pendatun	Speaker pro tempore of the Batasang Pambansa; March 13, 1985 – March 25, 1986	Succeeded by Antonio Cuenco (as speaker pro tempore of the House of Representatives)
Preceded by Himself (in the House of Representatives)	Assemblyman, Lanao del Sur; June 30, 1984 – March 25, 1986; Served alongside: Omar Dianalan	District abolished
Preceded by Rashid Lucman	Representative, Lanao del Sur's at-large district June 24, 1970 – January 17, 1973	Vacant Martial law and adoption of the 1973 Constitution Title next held by Himself and Omar Dianalan (in the Batasang Pambansa)
