= Imelda Dimaporo =

Filipino politician (born 1959)

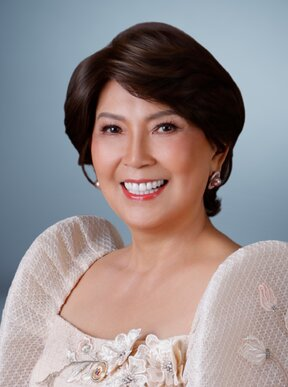
- Official portrait, 2025

Member of the Philippine House of Representatives from Lanao del Norte's 1st district
- Incumbent
- Assumed office June 30, 2025
- Preceded by: Mohamad Khalid Q. Dimaporo
- In office June 30, 2010 – June 30, 2016
- Preceded by: Vicente F. Belmonte Jr.
- Succeeded by: Mohamad Khalid Q. Dimaporo

6th and 8th Governor of Lanao del Norte
- In office June 30, 2016 – June 30, 2025
- Vice Governor: Maria Cristina Atay (2016–2022); Allan Lim (2022–2025)
- Preceded by: Mohamad Khalid Q. Dimaporo
- Succeeded by: Mohamad Khalid Q. Dimaporo
- In office June 30, 1998 – June 30, 2007
- Preceded by: Abdullah D. Dimaporo
- Succeeded by: Mohamad Khalid Q. Dimaporo

President of Lanao del Norte Ladies Circle
- In office 1996–1998

Personal details
- Born: Imelda dela Cruz Quibranza; January 15, 1959 (age 67) Tubod, Lanao del Norte, Philippines
- Party: PFP (2023–present); PDP–Laban (2016–2023); Liberal (2015–2016); NPC (2010–2015); Lakas (until 2010)
- Spouse: Abdullah Dimaporo
- Children: Fatima Aliah; Mohamad Khalid; Sittie Aminah; Mohammad Nazrollah; Mohammad Abdulsalam
- Education: Philippine Women's University

Imelda "Angging" dela Cruz Quibranza-Dimaporo (born January 15, 1959) is a Filipina politician who currently serves as the representative for Lanao del Norte's 1st district in the House of Representatives in 2025, having previously served in the same position from 2010 to 2016. She is also the Governor of Lanao del Norte from 2016 to 2025, and previously from 1998 to 2007.

== Personal life ==
Dimaporo was born as Imelda Quibranza on January 15, 1959, in Tubod, Lanao del Norte to Arsenio Quibranza, a Christian immigrant from Cebu who became vice governor and governor of Lanao del Norte, and Teofila dela Cruz.

In 1977, she married Abdullah Dimaporo despite him being the son of Arsenio Quibranza's political rival, Ali Dimaporo, in a dual civil and Islamic ceremony, and have five children together. She studied at the Philippine Women's University with a degree of business administration. She was the president of Lanao del Norte Ladies Circle from 1996 to 1998. She was also the chairman of League of Provinces of the Philippines of the same year. In 1998 she was elected as a governor and chairperson of Panguil Bay Development Council.
