= Mohammad Ali Dimaporo =

Filipino politician

Mohammad Ali B. Dimaporo
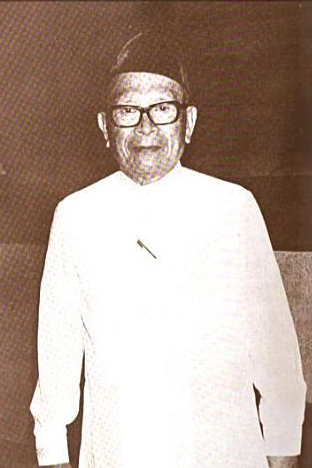
- Dimaporo's official portrait during the 8th Congress.

Member of the House of Representatives of the Philippines from Lanao del Sur's 2nd district
- In office June 30, 1987 – June 30, 1995
- Preceded by: district established
- Succeeded by: Pangalian Balindong

Member of the House of Representatives from Lanao del Norte's Lone district
- In office December 30, 1965 – September 23, 1972
- Preceded by: Laurentino Badelles
- Succeeded by: office abolished

Member of the House of Representatives from Lanao's Lone district
- In office May 21, 1957 – December 30, 1957
- Preceded by: Domocao Alonto
- Succeeded by: Laurentino Badelles
- In office December 30, 1949 – December 30, 1953
- Preceded by: Manalao Mindalano
- Succeeded by: Domocao Alonto

Governor of Lanao del Sur
- In office 1976 – March 1986
- Preceded by: Mamarinta Lao
- Succeeded by: Saidamen Pangarungan

Governor of Lanao del Norte
- In office 1960–1965
- Vice Governor: Arsenio Quibranza
- Preceded by: Salvador Lluch
- Succeeded by: Arsenio Quibranza

President of Mindanao State University
- In office 1976–1986
- Preceded by: Tocod Macaraya Sr.
- Succeeded by: Mangingin Magomnang

Personal details
- Born: Mohammad Ali Borngao Dimaporo; June 15, 1918 Binidayan, Lanao, Philippine Islands
- Died: April 21, 2004 (aged 85) Quezon City, Philippines
- Party: Nacionalista (1965–1972, 1992–1995)
- Other political affiliations: Kilusang Bagong Lipunan (1978–1992); Liberal (1949–1965)

Military service
- Branch/service: Philippine Constabulary; Philippine Army
- Rank: Captain

Mohammad Ali Borngao Dimaporo (June 15, 1918 – April 21, 2004) was a Filipino politician who represented the Lanao provinces in the House of Representatives of the Philippines from the 1950s to the 1990s and served as Governor of Lanao del Norte from 1960 to 1965 and of Lanao del Sur from 1976 to 1986. He was regarded as one of the most powerful Muslim politicians in the Philippines and one of the most important stalwarts of President Ferdinand Marcos in Mindanao during the martial law era.

== Early life and education ==
Mohammad Ali Borngao Dimaporo was born on June 15, 1918, to Datu Dimaporo Marahom and Potri-Maamor Borngao Marahom in Binidayan, Lanao (now a part of Lanao del Sur). His father was the sultan of Binidayan and the town's president. Dimaporo was mostly raised by his grandparents.

After graduating from high school in Dansalan in 1938, he took up law at the University of the Philippines, where he met fellow student Ferdinand Marcos and was impressed by his defense during his trial for the murder of Julio Nalundasan.

== Military service ==
Upon the outbreak of the Pacific theatre of the Second World War in December 1941, Dimaporo was drafted into the Philippine Army but was interned by the Japanese in Bukidnon in May 1942 following the American surrender. He was released in July 1942 after promising to assist in pacifying his fellow Maranaos but secretly assisted the guerrilla movement before taking up arms against the Japanese again in 1944. In June of that year, he led a guerrilla unit in raiding the town of Malabang, wiping out the Japanese garrison there.

After the war, Dimaporo joined the Philippine Constabulary and served as company commander in Malabang and Tugaya, handling the surrender of loose firearms and participating in anti-slavery operations in the area.

== Political career ==
Dimaporo started his political career by joining the Liberal Party and winning election in 1949 as representative of Lanao in the Philippine Congress. He lost reelection in 1953 to Domocao Alonto but won a recount six months before the next elections in 1957, by which time Alonto had already been elected to the Senate back in 1955. Dimaporo lost his reelection bid that November.

In 1959, the province of Lanao was divided into two separate provinces corresponding to its predominantly Christian northern and Muslim southern parts. Despite coming from Lanao del Sur, Dimaporo chose to continue his political career in Lanao del Norte, citing the established influence of the Alonto family in his home province. In 1960, Dimaporo ran and won as Governor of Lanao del Norte, defeating his rival Salvador Lluch by only 275 votes. In 1965, Dimaporo was elected representative of Lanao del Norte to Congress, serving until it was closed by President Marcos in 1972 following the declaration of Martial Law.

== Martial law ==
Dimaporo distinguished himself during the regime of President Ferdinand Marcos by securing his victory in Lanao del Norte during the 1965 presidential election by a wide margin despite Dimaporo being a member of the Liberal Party of reelectionist President Diosdado Macapagal. Dimaporo remained loyal to Marcos even after his native region rebelled against the national government during the Moro conflict in the late 1960s and 1970s. Dimaporo even went as far as naming one of his sons, who had been born during a campaign visit by Marcos, after the President, and tried to refute the existence of the Jabidah Massacre in 1968 by producing the supposedly-alive Muslim trainees for an invasion of Sabah who were massacred by the Armed Forces of the Philippines, but were subsequently revealed to be Ilocanos from Luzon following an investigation by Senator Benigno Aquino Jr. In another instance, Dimaporo proclaimed that he would do everything Marcos ordered him to do, including jumping into the sea, to show his intense loyalty to him.

As a reward, Marcos appointed Dimaporo as Governor of Lanao del Sur and concurrent president of the Mindanao State University (MSU) at the height of the martial law dictatorship in 1976, following the exile of his political rivals, the Lucmans and the Alontos. During this time, he was credited with expanding the university's facilities, but was criticized for stifling dissent by students and faculty and failing to prevent abuses by the military in the province.

By the early 1980s, Dimaporo was widely acknowledged to be the most powerful politician in Mindanao. He was regarded as the only Muslim whom Marcos really trusted and the leader of his Kilusang Bagong Lipunan Party in Mindanao. He was also regarded to be the sole gatekeeper between Marcos and Mindanao's Muslims, through which their petitions to Marcos' regime passed through. He was also said to have owned properties in Metro Manila and Los Angeles and amassed a private army of about 4,000 followers, which in turn grew out of the "Barracuda" militias that he helped establish in the late 1960s during the early phase of the sectarian conflict in Mindanao.

In August 1982, Marcos appointed Dimaporo as the only Muslim member of the National Executive Committee, which functioned as a key advisory council to the President and the de facto governing authority in the event of Marcos vacating the presidency. Later that year Dimaporo arranged to have himself "enthroned" as "His Royal Highness, the Sultan of Masiu" in a lavish ceremony attended by Marcos, First Lady Imelda Marcos, and the traditional nobility of Muslim Mindanao.

== After Martial Law ==
During the 1986 People Power Revolution, armed supporters of Dimaporo forced the cancellation of a prayer rally in support of the revolt in Marawi on February 24, while he himself holed up in the MSU with his men pledging to "defend the campus from attack", resulting in a standoff that lasted until he left the university on March 1, by which time Marcos had already fled.

Dimaporo was subsequently removed from his offices by President Corazon Aquino but refused to acknowledge his removal as governor, leading into another standoff when he ordered his men to fortify the provincial capitol. Although they were removed in a lightning operation by the military in April, his supporters then staged a series of attacks on opponents and army units in Marawi, while Dimaporo holed himself up in Binidayan, insisting on his legitimacy as governor and refusing to surrender his arsenal.

Dimaporo was also accused of involvement in coup attempts against Aquino in July 1986 and August 1987, the last of which was said to have been planned at his residence in Corinthian Gardens, Quezon City. He later managed to extricate himself by interceding in the return of abducted religious personnel in Marawi, and with the help of infighting among his opponents, was able to maintain his influence in Lanao, returning to Congress as representative of Lanao del Sur's 2nd district from 1987 to 1995. In 1990, he ran for governor of the Autonomous Region in Muslim Mindanao but lost to Zacaria Candao.

== Death ==
Dimaporo died of natural causes at the Philippine Heart Center in Quezon City on April 21, 2004. His remains were flown back to Mindanao and he was buried in Binidayan the following day.

== Family and legacy ==
Dimaporo founded a political dynasty that continues to dominate politics in the two Lanao provinces. His son Abdullah Dimaporo, daughter-in-law Imelda Quibranza-Dimaporo and grandson Mohamad Khalid Dimaporo have represented and governed Lanao del Norte since 1984, while his granddaughters Fatima Aliah Dimaporo and Sittie Aminah Dimaporo also represented Lanao del Norte in Congress. Abdullah married Imelda in 1977 despite Ali Dimaporo being a political rival of Imelda's father, Arsenio Quibranza. His brother-in-law, Omar Dianalan, served as mayor of Marawi.

Several of his siblings and cousins were also politicians in both Lanao del Norte and Lanao del Sur, such as his cousin Sultan Muliloda Datumulok, who served as mayor of Binidayan, and his brothers Macacuna Dimaporo, who served as congressman of Lanao del Sur and Speaker pro tempore of the Regular Batasang Pambansa, and Sultan Naga Dimaporo, who was mayor of Karomatan.
