= Abdullah D. Dimaporo =

Filipino politician

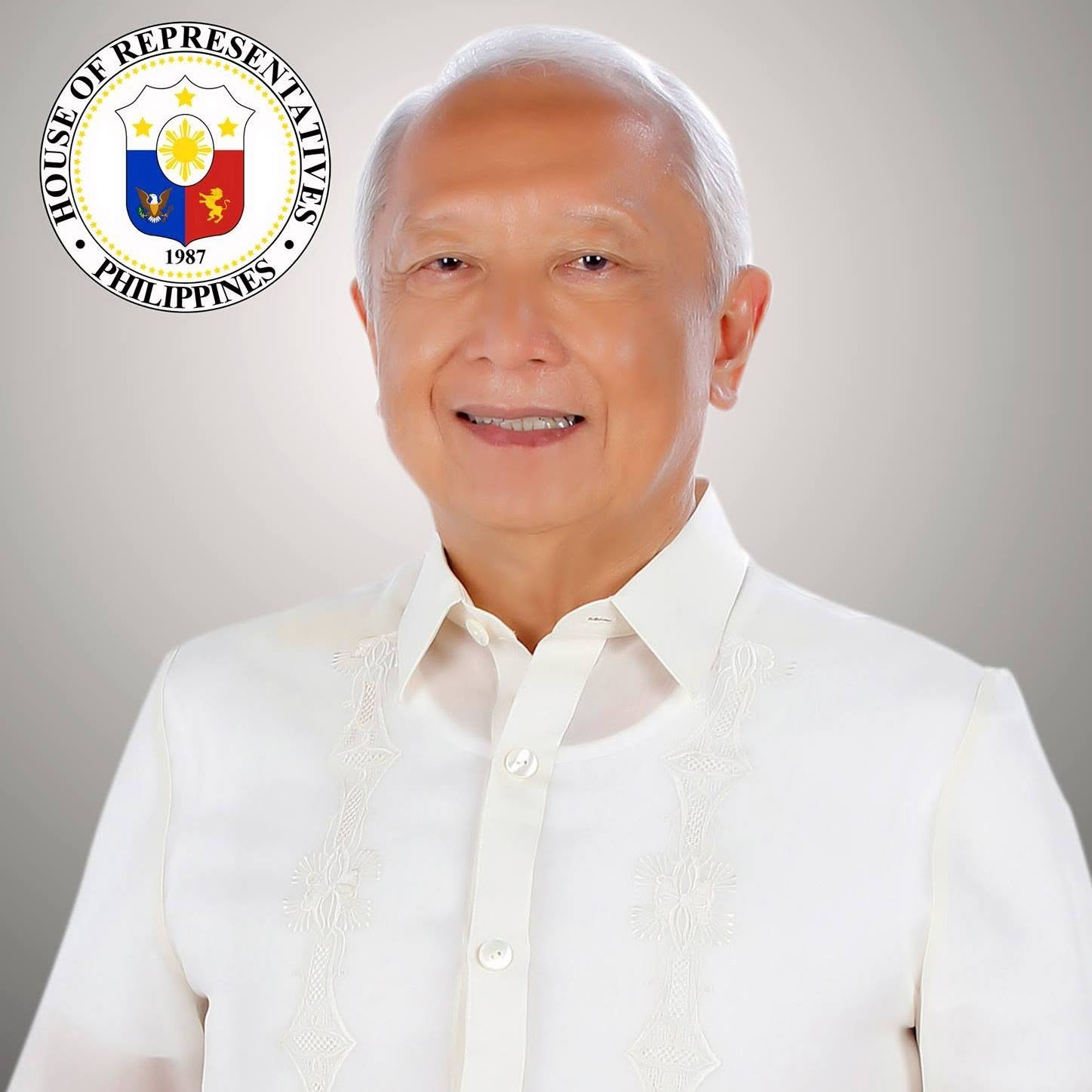
- Official portrait, 2017

Member of the Philippine House of Representatives from Lanao del Norte's 2nd District
- In office June 30, 2013 – June 30, 2022
- Preceded by: Fatima Dimaporo
- Succeeded by: Aminah Dimaporo
- In office June 30, 2001 – June 30, 2010
- Preceded by: Abdullah Mangotara
- Succeeded by: Fatima Dimaporo
- In office June 30, 1987 – December 27, 1989
- Preceded by: District established
- Succeeded by: Macabangkit Lanto

Governor of Lanao del Norte
- In office June 30, 1992 – June 30, 1998
- Preceded by: Francisco L. Abalos
- Succeeded by: Imelda Dimaporo

Personal details
- Party: NPC (2012–present)
- Other political affiliations: Lakas (1992–2012); KBL (1988–1992); UPP (1987–1992); Independent (1987–1988)
- Spouse: Imelda Dimaporo
- Children: Aminah Dimaporo; Fatima Aliah Dimaporo; Mohamad Khalid Dimaporo
- Parent: Mohammad Ali Dimaporo

Abdullah "Bobby" Dimakuta Dimaporo is a Filipino politician who was a member of the House of Representatives. He represented Lanao del Norte's 2nd congressional district.

== See also ==
- 8th Congress of the Philippines
- 12th Congress of the Philippines
- 13th Congress of the Philippines
- 14th Congress of the Philippines
- 16th Congress of the Philippines
- 17th Congress of the Philippines
- 18th Congress of the Philippines
