= 2016 Lanao del Sur local elections =

Philippine election

2016 Lanao del Sur gubernatorial election
- May 9, 2016
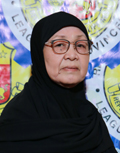

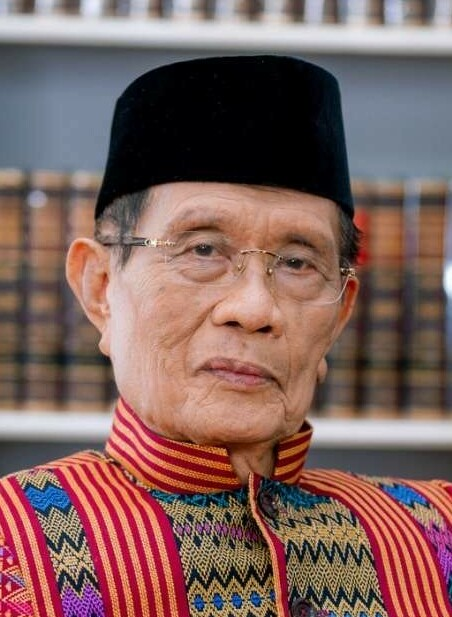
Nominee	Bae Soraya Alonto-Adiong	Fahad "Pre" Salic	Pangalian Balindong
Party	Liberal	UNA	Independent
Running mate	Mamintal Alonto Adiong Jr.	Mohammadali "Merikano" Abinal
Popular vote	194,853	128,298	26,325
Governor before election
Mamintal Alonto Adiong Jr.
Liberal
Elected Governor
Bae Soraya Alonto-Adiong
Liberal

Local elections were held in the province of Lanao del Sur on May 9, 2016, as part of the 2016 general election. Voters will select candidates for all local positions: a town mayor, vice mayor and town councilors, as well as members of the Sangguniang Panlalawigan, the vice-governor, governor and representatives for the two districts of Lanao del Sur.

== Provincial elections ==
The candidates for governor and vice governor with the highest number of votes wins the seat; they are voted separately, therefore, they may be of different parties when elected. Incumbent Governor Mamintal Alonto Adiong Jr. and Vice Governor Arsad Maruhombsar are barred from seeking reelection since they are in their third term.

== Background ==
The result of the election will determine if the Alonto-Adiong can still preserve their grip on the province. Incumbent Governor Adiong Jr. is barred to seek another term due to term limit, his brother First District Congressman Ansaruddin Alonto Adiong was expected by some of their allies to be his candidate. Meanwhile, Liberal Party (the governor's party) considered Governor Adiong's uncle-in-law Deputy Speaker of the House of Representatives of the Philippines Pangalian Balindong to be the party's gubernatorial bet.

But at the end, Governor Adiong Jr. will be fielding his mother, former First Lady Bae Soraya Alonto Adiong for the gubernatorial position against Deputy Speaker Pangalian Balindong and United Nationalist Alliance bet Marawi City Mayor Fahad "Pre" Salic and three others. While Governor Mamintal Adiong Jr. decided to run as his mother running mate against Marantao Mayor Mohammadali Abinal of United Nationalist Alliance and two others.

== Candidates ==
Incumbents are expressed in italics.

=== Governor ===
The gubernatorial race will be between Governor Adiong's mother former First Lady Bae Soraya Adiong of the Liberal Party, his long time ally and uncle-in-law Deputy Speaker of the House of Representatives of the Philippines Pangalian Balindong, and the tough Marawi City Mayor Fahad "Pre" Salic of United Nationalist Alliance, and three others. But it is expected to be a three-way race between former First Lady Adiong, Deputy Speaker Balindong and City Mayor Salic.

Lanao del Sur gubernatorial election
Party	Candidate	Votes	%
Liberal	Bae Soraya Alonto Adiong	194,853	
UNA	Fahad Salic	128,298	
Independent	Pangalian Balindong	26,325	
Independent	Jahlalodin Lucman	5,126	
Independent	Ahmadjan Abdulcarim	1,458	
PBM	Abdul Fatah Sarip	1,067	
Total votes		357,127	100.00

=== Vice-governor ===
Incumbent Vice-governor Arsad Maruhombsar is barred to seek another term and decided to retire from politics. Governor Mamintal Alonto Adiong Jr. decided to be his mother's running mate of the Liberal Party to preserve their grip on the province. Meanwhile, Marantao Mayor Mohammadali Abinal is nominated as the United Nationalist Alliance Vice-Gubernatorial bet and also chosen by Deputy Speaker Balindong as his vice-governor candidate.

Lanao del Sur vice-gubernatorial election
Party	Candidate	Votes	%
Liberal	Mamintal Alonto Adiong Jr.	253,753	
UNA	Mohammadali Abinal	70,087	
Independent	Caharodin Balindong	7,117	
Independent	Abet Sarip	3,535	
Total votes		334,492	100.00

=== Congressional Elections ===
==== 1st District of Lanao del Sur ====
Former Congressman Hussein Pacasum Pangandaman and his father former secretary of Agrarian Reform Nasser Pangandaman were rumored to be one of the candidates for the district representative. But instead, the latter decided to run for the mayoralty position of the Municipality of Masiu. And at the end, Incumbent Ansaruddin Alonto Adiong will face again former Congresswoman Faysah Dumarpa of the United Nationalist Alliance, and two others for his second term.

2016 Philippine House of Representatives election in Lanao del Sur 1st District
Party	Candidate	Votes	%
Liberal	Ansaruddin Alonto Adiong	78,851	
UNA	Faysah Dumarpa	64,830	
Independent	Calawanan Otara	450	
Independent	Mar Paiso	231	
Total votes			

==== 2nd District of Lanao del Sur ====
The battle for the congressional race in the second district is shaping up to be between the powerful Alonto and the old yet influential Dimaporo clan. Incumbent Deputy Speaker of the House of Representatives of the Philippines Pangalian Balindong is barred for seeking another term, he will instead run for governor. His son, incumbent ARMM Regional Legislative Assembly Assemblyman Yasser Balindong is his party's nominee against the late Batasang Pambansa Speaker Pro-Tempore Macacuna Dimaporo's son-in-law Tubaran Mayor Jun Papandayan and two others.

2016 Philippine House of Representatives election in Lanao del Sur 2nd District
Party	Candidate	Votes	%
PDP–Laban	Jun Papandayan	65,365	
Liberal	Yasser Balindong	61,542	
NPC	Mohammad Hafez Marohom	1,212	
Independent	Rommel Alonto	962	
Total votes			

=== Provincial Board Elections ===
==== First District ====
- City: Marawi City
- Municipality: Buadiposo-Buntong, Bubong, Bumbaran, Ditsaan-Ramain, Kapai, Lumba-Bayabao, Maguing, Marantao, Masiu, Mulondo, Piagapo, Poona Bayabao, Saguiaran, Tagoloan II, Tamparan, Taraka, Wao
- Population (2010): 547,633

2016 Provincial Board Election in 1st District of Lanao del Sur
Party	Candidate	Votes	%
UNA	Khomeini Taha	138,198	
Liberal	Alzaif Munder	118,712	
UNA	Esmael Mamarinta	89,573	
UNA	Hussien Magandia	81,059	
Liberal	Zorab Mangotara	79,122	
UNA	Jeraham Salic	77,358	
Liberal	Nash Ganda	67,619	
Liberal	Pogi Lucman	64,731	
Independent	Manny Macatanung	41,158	
NPC	H. Aiman Abul Lucman	37,832	
Liberal	Khana Anuar Marabur Jr.	34,952	
Independent	Casanain Labay	23,328	
Independent	Mangubra Laidan	20,515	
Ompia	Lomangco Abunamla	19,985	
UNA	Abu Aiman Dimapinto	17,429	
UNA	Bontalis Mala	10,479	
Ompia	Sultan-Minupun Guro	8,518	
NPC	Jalanie Rogong	8,373	
PBM	Casmer Abedin-Latip	5,896	
NPC	Musa Sultan	5,717	
Independent	Ting Manding	4,458	
Katipunan	Jamal Mangondato	4,447	
Independent	Cabib Mimbantas	3,983	
Independent	Mon Lomala	3,343	
Independent	Zainoden Disocor	3,201	
Independent	Ruben Guiling	2,656	
PBM	Mohammad Khalid Manda	2,285	
PBM	Abdulrahman Barazar	2,130	
NPC	Kamal Macasundig	1,946	
PBM	Abdulmalik Macadaub	1,783	
Independent	Camar Banocag Jr.	1,639	
PBM	Alex Balalayan	1,528	
Independent	Asis Mamongcara	1,446	
Total votes		985,569	100.00

==== Second District ====
- Municipality: Bacolod-Kalawi, Balabagan, Balindong, Bayang, Binidayan, Butig, Calanogas, Ganassi, Kapatagan, Lumbaca-Unayan, Lumbatan, Lumbayanague, Madalum, Madamba, Malabang, Marogong, Pagayawan, Picong, Pualas, Sultan Dumalondong, Tubaran, Tugaya
- Population (2010): 385,627

2016 Provincial Board Election in 2nd District of Lanao del Sur
Party	Candidate	Votes	%
Liberal	Taha Macapodi	54,476	
Independent	Abdulhamid Amerbitor	53,540	
UNA	Amron Maruhon	53,004	
Liberal	Caoden Marohombsar	51,862	
Liberal	Abdul Harris Macacua	51,470	
Independent	Amir-Oden Balindong	49,941	
Liberal	Abuali Abdullatif	40,904	
Liberal	Morsalim Binnortominoray	39,795	
Independent	Pagnao Sarip	31,174	
Independent	Suharno Basir	28,316	
UNA	Ustad Dipatuan	26,357	
PBM	Alem Dariday Mimbalawag	18,346	
UNA	Darling Buleg	16,018	
Independent	Zainoden Abdul Ganie	9,936	
NPC	Maco Macugar	9,454	
Independent	Ulomoden Magarang	7,105	
Independent	Ibno Amanodin	5,909	
UNA	Abdulwahab Hadjiesaipoden	5,221	
NPC	Parok Bajunaid Balt	5,127	
Independent	Mohammad Faiz Alonto	4,538	
Independent	Bukhari Cali	4,494	
Independent	Ustad Abdullah H. Zaman	4,330	
Independent	Abdul Gafour Ampatua	4,118	
NPC	Ansarie Guro	2,760	
PBM	Lommy Aayonan	2,317	
NPC	Usman Baute	2,139	
Independent	Abdulnasser Samporna	2,067	
Independent	Naguib Macabato	1,830	
PBM	Saidamen Omar	1,274	
Independent	Jamal Urandig	915	
PBM	Zolaica Mustapha	838	
Independent	Abdulmadid Pumbagul	828	
Total votes		590,683	100.00

=== Mayoral Election ===
==== Islamic City of Marawi ====
Incumbent City Mayor Fahad "Pre" Salic is barred to seek another term and decided to run for governor. The battle for the mayoralty race in the province's capital is to be between Mayor Salic's elder brother former city mayor Solitario Ali, ARMM Regional Legislative Assembly Assemblyman Majul Gandamra and Ismael Tomawis.

Marawi Mayoralty Election
Party	Candidate	Votes	%
Liberal	Majul Gandamra	21,684	48.42
PDP–Laban	Solitario Ali	21,414	47.82
LDP	Ismael Tomawis	1,682	3.76
Total votes		44,780	100.00

=== First District ===
==== Buadiposo-Buntong ====
Buadiposo-Buntong Mayoralty Election
Party	Candidate	Votes	%
Liberal	Noron Dadayan	9,097	
Independent	Anisah Asisor	339	
Independent	Anshary Mandoma	248	
Independent	Lindy Mamaroba	6	
Total votes			

==== Bubong ====
Incumbent Mayor Alfais Munder will seek another term against Wahab Macapundag of KBL and Danny Langgoyo.

Bubong Mayoralty Election
Party	Candidate	Votes	%
Liberal	Alfais Munder	8,558	
KBL	Wahab Macapundag	302	
Independent	Danny Langgoyo	50	
Total votes			

==== Bumbaran ====
Incumbent Mayor Jamal "James" Manabilang will seek another term unopposed.

Bumbaran Mayoralty Election
Party	Candidate	Votes	%
Liberal	Jamal Manabilang	4,884	100.00
Total votes		4,884	100.00

==== Ditsaan-Ramain ====
Ditsaan-Ramain Mayoralty Election
Party	Candidate	Votes	%
Independent	Saidamen Adiong	8,225	
NPC	Anna-Mahlyne Macarampat	1,321	
Independent	Bacrainie Pandapatan	5	
Independent	Qareeb Panarigan	3	
Independent	Acsapala Gulam	2	
Total votes			

==== Kapai ====
Kapai Mayoralty Election
Party	Candidate	Votes	%
Liberal	Hamza Gauraki	5,737	99.84
UNA	Omar Abubacar Gauraki	7	0.12
Independent	Alexander Didato	2	0.04
Total votes		5,746	100.00

==== Lumba-Bayabao ====
Incumbent Mayor and Lumba-Bayabao kingpin Gambai Dagalangit will seek another term again and will face his relative Amialongan Dagalangit, Mangatha Dianaton, Abdul Rashid Macala of Liberal Party and Fatah Rasul.

Lumba-Bayabao Mayoralty Election
Party	Candidate	Votes	%
UNA	Gambai Dagalangit	6,783	
Liberal	Abdul Rashid Macala	1,646	
Independent	Amialongan Dagalangit	250	
NPC	Mangatha Dianaton	13	
Independent	Fatah Rasul	9	
Total votes			

==== Maguing ====
Maguing Mayoralty Election
Party	Candidate	Votes	%
Liberal	Mamaulan Molok	9,874	
NPC	Hadji Mohaysen H. Rakim	4,586	
Independent	Jonairah Abinal	78	
Independent	Magrara Ampuan	5	
UNA	Ansari Yahya	4	
Total votes			

==== Marantao ====
Incumbent Mayor Racma Abinal will seek another term again and will face Samson Adiong, Jasmin Adtha-Magangcong, Kiram Tahir, Mohammad Tanggote.

Marantao Mayoralty Election
Party	Candidate	Votes	%
UNA	Racma Abinal	10,234	
NPC	Samson Adiong	5,588	
Liberal	Jasmin Adtha-Magangcong	1,908	
Independent	Mohammad Tanggote	782	
Independent	Kiram Tahir	4	
Total votes			

==== Masiu ====
Masiu Mayoralty Election
Party	Candidate	Votes	%
Lakas	Nasser Pangandaman	3,534	
Akbayan	Romil Guiling	3,472	
Liberal	Raffy Guiling	2,173	
Independent	Lomina Pangamadun	23	
Independent	Abdulgafur Magarang	14	
Independent	Ustad Pinto	4	
Independent	Hadji Rigaro Saliwato	4	
Independent	Abdulazis Sharief	4	
Total votes			

==== Mulondo ====
Mulondo Mayoralty Election
Party	Candidate	Votes	%
UNA	Machol Adbulsalam	4,086	
NPC	Malik Batao	406	
Liberal	Ali Abdulsalam	135	
Independent	Mohajed Maruhom	1	
Independent	Johary Faiz Babao	0	
Independent	Johary Panandigan	0	
Independent	Lomontana Pangcatan	0	
Total votes			

==== Piagapo ====
Incumbent Mayor Ali Sumandar will seek another term and will face Asnawie Bato, Sittie Mandalog, Adil Sultan.

Piagapo Mayoralty Election
Party	Candidate	Votes	%
Liberal	Ali Sumandar	9,875	
Independent	Sittie Mandalog	334	
Independent	Adil Sultan	105	
UNA	Asnawie Bato	38	
Total votes			

==== Poona Bayabao ====
Incumbent Mayor Lampa Pandi is barred to seek another term and will run as town vice mayor. The battle for the mayoralty position will be between Tohamy Domado, Ibrahim Yusoph, Alibasha Lucman, Cacayadun Manta, Sadat Pandi and Sana Sangkupan.

Poona Bayabao Mayoralty Election
Party	Candidate	Votes	%
Independent	Sadat Pandi	7,734	
UNA	Yusoph Ibrahim	609	
Independent	Alibasha Lucman Jr.	43	
Independent	Tohamy Domado	10	
Independent	Cacayadun Manta	1	
Independent	Sana Sangkupan	0	
Total votes			

==== Saguiaran ====
Saguiaran Mayoralty Election
Party	Candidate	Votes	%
Liberal	Macmod Muti	8,394	
UNA	Sabdullah Macabago	7,490	
Independent	Amer Maraorao	58	
Independent	Jamael Salacop	21	
Independent	Khalid Lininding	18	
Total votes			

==== Tagoloan II ====
Tagoloan II Mayoralty Election
Party	Candidate	Votes	%
Liberal	Misangcad Capal	8,012	
Independent	Alex Lumpa	246	
Independent	Oga Abbas	127	
Independent	Cosain Capal	43	
Independent	Esnaira Capal	42	
Independent	Candidato Capal	25	
Independent	Abdal Sacar	0	
Independent	Dimalipos Sacar	0	
Total votes			

==== Tamparan ====
Tamparan Mayoralty Election
Party	Candidate	Votes	%
Liberal	Sittie Amina Disomimba	6,622	
Independent	Acmad Aliponto Jr.	3,241	
PDP–Laban	Zamzam Ali	354	
Independent	Jamael Dima	52	
Independent	Malik Cabuntalan	21	
Total votes			

==== Taraka ====
Taraka Mayoralty Election
Party	Candidate	Votes	%
Liberal	Areefah Sumagayan	9,439	100.00
Independent	Alimar Colangcag	0	0.00
Independent	Sultan Malailah Comadug	0	0.00
Independent	Jomaimah Mamangcao	0	0.00
Total votes		9,439	100.00

==== Wao ====
The battle for the mayoralty position will be between Liberal Party's Bobby Balicao, Mary Ruth Catalan and Lominog Hadji Nasser.

Wao Mayoralty Election
Party	Candidate	Votes	%
Liberal	Bobby Balicao	17,545	
NPC	Mary Ruth Carumba-Catalan	8,813	
Independent	Lominog Hadji Nasser	189	
Total votes			

=== Second District ===
==== Bacolod-Kalawi ====
Incumbent Mayor Abdul Mohaimen Dipatuan will seek another term against Tamim Amanoddin, Sartata Dipatuan and Bogdad Balindong.

Bacolod-Kalawi Mayoralty Election
Party	Candidate	Votes	%
Liberal	Abdul Mohaimen Dipatuan	4,282	
NPC	Tamim Amanoddin	792	
Independent	Sartata Dipatuan	4	
Independent	Bogdad Macaborod Balindong	3	
Total votes			

==== Balabagan ====
Incumbent Mayor Edna Benito will seek another term against her nemesis and uncle mayor-elect but disqualified former Mayor Amer Sampiano, another uncle incumbent Vice-Mayor Quirino Sampiano, Apolo Morro and Chicote Norma.

Balabagan Mayoralty Election
Party	Candidate	Votes	%
Liberal	Edna Benito	5,736	
PDP–Laban	Quirino Sampiano	4,688	
UNA	Amer Sampiano	52	
Independent	Norma Chicote	13	
Independent	Apolo Morro	11	
Total votes			

==== Balindong ====
Incumbent Mayor Raysalam Bagul-Mangondato is eligible for another term. She filed her candidacy for re-election but withdraw and instead supported her brother, former mayor Benjamin Bagul against Linindingan Ramos, Mahmod Abdullah and Socor Tomara.

Balindong Mayoralty Election
Party	Candidate	Votes	%
Liberal	Benjamin Bagul	7,945	
NPC	Mahmod Abdullah	2,404	
UNA	Linindingan Ramos	717	
Independent	Socor Tomara	26	
Total votes			

==== Bayang ====
Incumbent Mayor Maya Ampatua will seek for another term against Aslani Balt, Cairon Macadaub, Camil Sangcoopan and Bryan Sarip.

Bayang Mayoralty Election
Party	Candidate	Votes	%
NPC	Aslani Balt	5,711	
Liberal	Maya Ampatua	4,594	
Independent	Camil Sangcopan	92	
Independent	Cairon Macadaub	8	
Nacionalista	Bryan Sarip	4	
Total votes			

==== Binidayan ====
Incumbent Mayor Abdullah Datumulok is eligible for another term. He will be facing the tandem of his two predecessors and brother former Mayor Aman Misbac Datumolok and another former Mayor Punudaranao Datumulok, and three others.

Binidayan Mayoralty Election
Party	Candidate	Votes	%
Liberal	Abdullah Datumulok	3,542	
UNA	Aman Misbac Datumolok	2,135	
Independent	Salac Raraco	64	
Independent	Mohammad Hosni Dimaporo	22	
Independent	Samen Bassar	10	
Total votes			

==== Butig ====
Butig Mayoralty Election
Party	Candidate	Votes	%
Liberal	Pansar Dimnatang	4,446	
UNA	Ibrahim Macadato	4,092	
Independent	Nassif Macadato	16	
Independent	Zapata Aboca	9	
Independent	Mamasao Mama	8	
Aksyon	Edris Bao	7	
Independent	Faiza Amatonding	4	
Independent	Abdulrahman Cosain	4	
Total votes			

==== Calanogas ====
Incumbent Mayor and Calanogas kingpin Macapado Benito Sr. is unopposed for his position.

Calanogas Mayoralty Election
Party	Candidate	Votes	%
Liberal	Macapado Benito Sr.	5,345	100.00
Total votes		5,345	100.00

==== Ganassi ====
The battle for the Mayoralty position will be a rematch between incumbent mayor Al-Rashid Macapodi and Fahad Diangka.

Ganassi Mayoralty Election
Party	Candidate	Votes	%
Liberal	Al-Rashid Macapodi	6,385	
UNA	Fahad Diangka	420	
Total votes			

==== Kapatagan ====
Kapatagan Mayoralty Election
Party	Candidate	Votes	%
Liberal	Nhazruddin Maglangit	8,149	
UNA	Masser Bansil	389	
Total votes			

==== Lumbaca-Unayan ====
Lumbaca-Unayan Mayoralty Election
Party	Candidate	Votes	%
Independent	Somerado Guro	1,760	
Liberal	Saripoden Guro	1,725	
Independent	Ismael Guro	25	
Independent	Ito Mama Guro	11	
Independent	Calil Guro	8	
Independent	Mama Macugar	7	
Independent	Aniraini Datu-Dacula	5	
NPC	Omira Guro	3	
Independent	Alinair Alawi	2	
Total votes			

==== Lumbatan ====
Lumbatan Mayoralty Election
Party	Candidate	Votes	%
Independent	Allan Lao	5,120	
Liberal	Sittiehaya Razuman	3,884	
Independent	Pao Mipangcat	9	
Lakas	Melanie Dumagay	7	
UNA	Mohaimen Gorondaya	3	
Independent	Abulali Ibrahim	3	
Total votes			

==== Lumbayanague ====
The battle for the Mayoralty position will be between UNA's nominee Salamona Asum, Liberal Party's Ansary Gunting, Simpan Gunting and Alexander Salo.

Lumbayanague Mayoralty Election
Party	Candidate	Votes	%
UNA	Salamona Asum	2,963	
Liberal	Ansary Gunting	309	
Independent	Simpan Gunting	3	
Independent	Alexander Salo	0	
Total votes			

==== Madalum ====
Madalum Mayoralty Election
Party	Candidate	Votes	%
Liberal	Soraida Mindalano-Sarangani	4,957	
Aksyon	Normilah Guinal	616	
Independent	Normila Angni	54	
Independent	Abdulsani Bansao	11	
UNA	Faridah Sarangani	7	
Independent	Norhata Mindalano	5	
NPC	Almyrah Sarangani	3	
Independent	Sittie Aisah Sarangani	1	
Independent	Usman Sarangani Sr.	1	
Independent	Ibrahim Tanggino	1	
Total votes			

==== Madamba ====
Madamba Mayoralty Election
Party	Candidate	Votes	%
Liberal	Dagoroan Mindalano	6,435	
UNA	Manly Sarangani	110	
Independent	Tahir Macapanton	16	
NPC	Malobay Amol	11	
Total votes			

==== Malabang ====
Incumbent Mayor Omensalam Balindong will be facing her in-law Amer Balindong, and two others for her re-election.

Malabang Mayoralty Election
Party	Candidate	Votes	%
Independent	Omensalam Balindong	8,564	
Liberal	Amer Balindong	3,887	
Independent	Talha Garo	120	
Independent	Handala Malawani	45	
Total votes			

==== Marogong ====
Incumbent Mayor Haroun Maruhom will be challenged by incumbent Vice-Mayor Alioden Didatoon, and three others for his re-election.

Marogong Mayoralty Election
Party	Candidate	Votes	%
Liberal	Haroun Maruhom	4,699	
NPC	Alioden Didatoon	2,947	
Independent	Naima Cosain	33	
Independent	Alimona Amerol	18	
Independent	Noraida Ibrahim	3	
Total votes			

==== Pagayawan ====
Pagayawan Mayoralty Election
Party	Candidate	Votes	%
Liberal	Hanifah Diamael	5,412	
Akbayan	Sailaney Benito	418	
Independent	Acmad Balindong	75	
Independent	Datu Amangoda Ampuan	7	
Independent	Bali Sarif	6	
Total votes			

==== Picong ====
Picong Mayoralty Election
Party	Candidate	Votes	%
Liberal	Alinader Balindong	7,807	100.00
Total votes		7,807	100.00

==== Pualas ====
Pualas Mayoralty Election
Party	Candidate	Votes	%
Liberal	Shariefullah Tanog	3,971	
Independent	Dianaton Tanog	852	
UNA	Misolawan Sahabuden	20	
Independent	Alyasser Dimaayao	14	
Total votes			

==== Sultan Dumalondong ====
Sultan Dumalondong Mayoralty Election
Party	Candidate	Votes	%
Liberal	Jamel Kurangking	1,595	
UNA	Fatima Kurangking	1,485	
NPC	Camilo Manali	111	
Independent	Rasmia Bongaros	9	
PDP–Laban	Omel Kurangking	7	
Independent	Rohaynee Asum	6	
Independent	Aiman Kurangking	6	
Independent	Taha Pandapatan	4	
Independent	Ainah Abarao	2	
Independent	Norayah Bacaraman	2	
Independent	Najeb Aabasagan	1	
Independent	Morshed Abdulcate	1	
Independent	Noraina Awal	1	
Independent	Sittie Dicasaran	1	
Independent	Abdulhadialmar Tamano	1	
Independent	Diamond Abdulhamid	0	
Independent	Hammad Abdulhamid	0	
Independent	Morakan Macaindig	0	
Independent	Acmad Panonggo	0	
Total votes			

==== Tubaran ====
Incumbent Mayor Jun Papandayan is allowed to seek another term but instead decided to run for the district representative. He decided to field his son Khaled Yassin Papandayan against his nemesis's son Abdelyusoph Fahad, his brother-in-law Rafael Yassin Dimaporo, Fais Amil and Likapao Andag.

Tubaran Mayoralty Election
Party	Candidate	Votes	%
Liberal	Khaled Yassin Papandayan	6,636	
NPC	Abdelyusoph Fahad	442	
Independent	Rafael Yassin Dimaporo	75	
Independent	Fais Amil	3	
Independent	Likapao Andag	3	
Total votes			

==== Tugaya ====
Tugaya Mayoralty Election
Party	Candidate	Votes	%
Liberal	Alfattah Pacalna	4,390	
UNA	Naip Pukunum	2,872	
Independent	Ayonan Pangcoga	457	
PDP–Laban	Suhaili Abangon	140	
Independent	Jamilon Pukunum	111	
Independent	Solaiman Decampong	6	
Independent	Hasan Sarip	4	
Total votes			
