= Legislative districts of Lanao del Sur =

Legislative district of the Philippines

The legislative districts of Lanao del Sur are the representations of the province of Lanao del Sur in the various national legislatures of the Philippines. The province is currently represented in the lower house of the Congress of the Philippines through its first and second congressional districts.

== History ==
Prior to gaining separate representation, areas now under the jurisdiction of Lanao del Sur were represented under the Department of Mindanao and Sulu (1917–1935) and the historical Lanao Province (1935–1961).

The enactment of Republic Act No. 2228 on May 22, 1959 divided the old Lanao Province into Lanao del Norte and Lanao del Sur, and provided them each with a congressional representative. In accordance with Section 8 of R.A. 2228, the incumbent representative of Lanao Province, Laurentino Badelles, also represented Lanao del Sur until voters of the new province elected their separate representative in the next general election, which took place in 1961. The chartered city of Dansalan (renamed to Marawi in 1956), despite being enumerated as part of the territory of neither successor province, was designated as Lanao del Sur's seat of provincial government and became part of its lone congressional district.

Lanao del Sur was represented in the Interim Batasang Pambansa as part of Region XII from 1978 to 1984, and returned two representatives, elected at large, to the Regular Batasang Pambansa in 1984.

Under the new Constitution which was proclaimed on February 11, 1987, the province was reapportioned into two congressional districts; each elected its member to the restored House of Representatives starting that same year.

== 1st District ==
- City: Marawi
- Municipalities: Amai Manabilang (Bumbaran), Buadiposo-Buntong, Bubong, Ditsaan-Ramain, Kapai, Lumba-Bayabao, Maguing, Marantao, Masiu, Mulondo, Piagapo, Poona Bayabao, Saguiaran, Tagoloan II, Tamparan, Taraka, Wao
- Population (2020): 686,512

Period	Representative
8th Congress; 1987–1992	Sultan Omar M. Dianalan (Note: Only took oath of office on November 19, 1987, following the completion of voting in all areas where failures of elections were declared. Died on April 30, 1990; seat remained vacant for the remainder of the 8th Congress.)
8th Congress; 1987–1992	vacant
9th Congress; 1992–1995	Mamintal M. Adiong, Sr. (Note: Only took oath of office on November 10, 1992, following the completion of voting in all areas where failures of elections were declared.)
10th Congress; 1995–1998	Mamintal M. Adiong, Sr.
11th Congress; 1998–2001	Mamintal M. Adiong, Sr.
12th Congress; 2001–2004	Faysah Maniri-Racman Dumarpa
13th Congress; 2004–2007	Faysah Maniri-Racman Dumarpa
14th Congress; 2007–2010	Faysah Maniri-Racman Dumarpa
15th Congress; 2010–2013	Mohammed Hussin P. Pangandaman (Note: Only took oath of office on November 15, 2010, following the completion of voting in all areas where failures of elections were declared.)
16th Congress; 2013–2016	Ansaruddin Abdul Malik A. Adiong
17th Congress; 2016–2019	Ansaruddin Abdul Malik A. Adiong
18th Congress; 2019–2022	Ansaruddin Abdul Malik A. Adiong
19th Congress; 2022–2025	Ziaur-Rahman A. Adiong

== 2nd District ==
- Municipalities: Bacolod-Kalawi (Bacolod Grande), Balabagan, Balindong, Bayang, Binidayan, Butig, Calanogas, Ganassi, Kapatagan, Lumbatan, Lumbayanague, Madalum, Madamba, Malabang, Marogong, Pagayawan, Picong (Sultan Gumander), Pualas, Tubaran, Tugaya, Sultan Dumalondong (established 1995), Lumbaca-Unayan (established 2004)
- Population (2020): 509,006

Period	Representative
8th Congress; 1987–1992	Mohammad Ali Dimaporo (Note: Only took oath of office for second term on January 18, 1993, following the completion of voting in all areas where failures of elections were declared.)
9th Congress; 1992–1995	Mohammad Ali Dimaporo
10th Congress; 1995–1998	Ali Pangalian M. Balindong
11th Congress; 1998–2001	Benasing O. Macarambon, Jr. (Note: Only took oath of office on November 11, 1998, following the completion of voting in all areas where failures of elections were declared.)
12th Congress; 2001–2004	Benasing O. Macarambon, Jr.
13th Congress; 2004–2007	Benasing O. Macarambon, Jr.
14th Congress; 2007–2010	Ali Pangalian M. Balindong
15th Congress; 2010–2013	Ali Pangalian M. Balindong
16th Congress; 2013–2016	Ali Pangalian M. Balindong
17th Congress; 2016–2019	Mauyag M. Papandayan, Jr.
18th Congress; 2019–2022	Yasser A. Balindong
19th Congress; 2022–2025	Yasser A. Balindong

== Lone District (defunct) ==
Period	Representative
5th Congress; 1961–1965	Rashid Lucman
6th Congress; 1965–1969	Rashid Lucman
7th Congress; 1969–1972	Macacuna Dimaporo (Note: Only took oath of office on June 24, 1970 following the resolution of legal battle surrounding the 1969 election results contested by Rashid Lucman.)

== At-Large (defunct) ==
Period	Representatives
Regular Batasang Pambansa; 1984–1986	Sultan Omar M. Dianalan
Regular Batasang Pambansa; 1984–1986	Macacuna Dimaporo

== See also ==
- Legislative district of Mindanao and Sulu
- Legislative district of Lanao
