= List of executive orders by Diosdado Macapagal =

Listed below are executive orders signed by Philippine President Diosdado Macapagal.

== 1961 ==
| No. | Title | Date signed |
|---|---|---|
| 1 | Creating the Presidential Committee on Administering Performance Efficiency under the Office of the President | December 30, 1961 |
| 2 | Revoking unnumbered executive order, dated February 13, 1959, entitled, "Designating the RPS Lapu-Lapu as the flagship of the Philippine Navy," and ordering the sale of said vessel at public auction | December 31, 1961 |

== 1962 ==
| No. | Title | Date signed |
|---|---|---|
| 3 | Extending the prohibition to slaughter carabaos up to December 31, 1962 | January 12, 1962 |
| 4 | Creating a Presidential Anti-Graft Committee | January 18, 1962 |
| 5 | Modifying the rates of import duty on certain imported articles as provided under Republic Act Number Nineteen Hundred Thirty-Seven, otherwise known as the Tariff and Customs Code of the Philippines | January 21, 1962 |
| 6 | Adopting a program to stabilize the price of palay, rice, and corn, and creating a Presidential Rice and Corn Committee to implement and execute that program | January 25, 1962 |
| 7 | Enjoining all officers and employees of the executive branch of the Government to cooperate in the drive against smuggled products and to desist from buying possessing, or using them, and appealing to the public for cooperation | March 22, 1962 |
| 8 | Fixing office hours during the hot season | March 30, 1962 |
| 9 | Instituting the Presidential Citation for Honesty and Integrity | May 12, 1962 |
| 10 | Designating calendar year 1962 as Economic Census Year | May 23, 1962 |
| 11 | Abolishing the Peace and Amelioration Fund Commission | June 25, 1962 |
| 12 | Providing instructions to be followed in the conduct of public affairs during the time that the president is outside the Philippines | June 28, 1962 |
| 13 | Creating the Business Guidance and Statistical Center | June 28, 1962 |
| 13-A | Modifying the rates of import duty on certain imported articles as provided under Republic Act Number Nineteen Hundred Thirty-Seven, otherwise known as the Tariff and Customs Code of the Philippines | June 28, 1962 |
| 14 | Abolishing the Jose Rizal National Centennial Commission and creating a committee to carry out the remaining activities of the commission | June 29, 1962 |
| 15 | Declaring the Nabunturan-Mainit Park Road, Davao province, from Kilometer 453.20 to Kilometer 467.67, a national secondary road | July 30, 1962 |
| 16 | Relaxing the regulation on the prohibition of taking aerial photography for surveying and mapping purposes | August 20, 1962 |
| 17 | Creating the Program Implementation Agency for carrying out the Socio-Economic Program | August 24, 1962 |
| 18 | Intensifying the national food production campaign | August 30, 1962 |
| 19 | Opening the port of Claveria, Cagayan, as sub-port of entry within the collection district of the port of Aparri | September 12, 1962 |
| 20 | Amending Paragraph 2, Subparagraph (E), of Executive Order No. 34, dated June 1, 1954, declaring that portion of the Benguet Road (Kennon Road) from Klondyke's Spring to Camp Six within the Mountain Province as toll road and fixing schedule of fees for the collection of tolls thereon | September 17, 1962 |
| 21 | Declaring the proposed San Fernando Airport Road in La Union, from the junction with the Poro Point Road to the terminal office of the airport as national secondary road | September 17, 1962 |
| 22 | Providing for the implementing details for Republic Act No. 2717, otherwise known as the Electrification Administration Act | October 1, 1962 |
| 23 | Prescribing the base pay of officers of the Armed Forces of the Philippines | October 5, 1962 |
| 24 | Amending Executive Order No. 571 creating a decoration to be known as the Order of Sikatuna | October 19, 1962 |
| 25 | Declaring the Agoo Beach Road, La Union, from Kilometer 236.295 to Kilometer 242.957 or 6.662 kilometers as national secondary road | November 28, 1962 |
| 26 | Revising Executive Order No. 108, dated December 3, 1947, entitled "Reorganizing the Lighthouse Board" | December 11, 1962 |
| 27 | Declaring the Camalig-Comun-Gapo Road, Albay province, from Kilometer 538.44 to Kilometer 553.04, or a distance of 14.60 kilometers, a national secondary road | December 21, 1962 |
| 28 | Amending Executive Order No. 14, dated June 29, 1962, by converting the committee created thereunder into a National Heroes Commission with additional members, duties, and functions | December 27, 1962 |
| 29 | Extending the prohibition to slaughter carabaos up to December 31, 1963 | December 28, 1962 |

== 1963 ==
| No. | Title | Date signed |
|---|---|---|
| 30 | Creating an executive committee for the development of the Quezon Memorial, Luneta, and other national parks | January 14, 1963 |
| 31 | Modifying the rates of import duty on certain imported articles as provided under Republic Act Number Nineteen Hundred Thirty-Seven, otherwise known as the Tariff and Customs Code of the Philippines | January 25, 1963 |
| 32 | Amending further Executive Order No. 72 dated December 3, 1936, establishing a classification of ports | January 25, 1963 |
| 33 | Amending Executive Order No. 16 dated April 24, 1922, so as to change the composition of the committee therein created | January 25, 1963 |
| 34 | Reclassifying all chartered cities, except Baguio and Quezon cities | January 30, 1963 |
| 35 | Transferring the seat of government of the municipality of Dangcagan in the province of Bukidnon from its present site at the barrio of Dangcagan, to the barrio of Kitaotao, same municipality | February 28, 1963 |
| 36 | Creating the Loans and Investment Council | March 19, 1963 |
| 37 | Fixing office hours during the hot season | March 20, 1963 |
| 38 | Amending Executive Order No. 118, dated June 22, 1955, creating a committee to screen and aid deserving squatters and new settlers in Oriental Mindoro | April 8, 1963 |
| 39 | Providing for the collection of material historical and cultural relics and the compilation of historical and cultural data regarding barrios, municipalities, cities and provinces of the Philippines | May 13, 1963 |
| 40 | Further amending the Third Paragraph of Executive Order No. 298, dated August 12, 1940, entitled "Prescribing the automatic renewal of contracts, requiring public bidding before entering into new contracts, and providing exceptions thereof," as amended by Executive Order No. 146, dated December 27, 1955; Executive Order No. 212, dated November 6, 1956; Executive Order No. 318, dated September 17, 1958; and Executive Order No. 358, dated September 23, 1959 | June 1, 1963 |
| 41 | Designating certain parcels of land situated in the barrio of San Jose, municipality of Pili, province of Camarines Sur, as the new capitol site of said province | June 24, 1963 |
| 42 | Declaring certain municipal districts in the Philippines as municipalities | June 25, 1963 |
| 43 | Amending Executive Order No. 34, current series, reclassifying all chartered cities, except Manila, Baguio and Quezon cities, so as to adjust the classification of the city of Legazpi | July 29, 1963 |
| 44 | Creating the National Defense College of the Armed Forces of the Philippines | August 12, 1963 |
| 45 | Amending Executive No. 36, series of 1963, creating the Loans and Investment Council | August 19, 1963 |
| 46 | Consolidating and reuniting the territories of the municipalities of Polo and Valenzuela into a municipality to be known as Valenzuela | September 11, 1963 |
| 47 | Creating the municipality of Maganoy in the province of Cotabato | September 11, 1963 |
| 48 | Revising the membership of the Tagaytay Development Commission | September 16, 1963 |
| 49 | Further amending Executive Order No. 58 dated August 16, 1954, as to membership in the National Shrines Commission and for other purposes | September 16, 1963 |
| 50 | Designating city health officers, district health officers, municipal health officers and presidents of sanitary divisions as ex officio medical members of acceptance boards | September 16, 1963 |
| 51 | Requiring all departments, bureaus, offices, agencies, instrumentalities, and political subdivisions of the Government, including the corporations owned and controlled by the Government, the Armed Forces, Government hospitals, and public educational institutions to buy through public bidding from local textile mills, whenever available, all their requirements for clothing materials | September 17, 1963 |
| 52 | Amending Executive Order No. 408, dated November 9, 1960, entitled "Providing a more expeditious system and simpler forms for the encouragement and facilitation of foreign tourist travel to the Philippines" | September 18, 1963 |
| 53 | Abolishing the Juan Luna Centennial Commission | October 3, 1963 |
| 54 | Amending Executive Order No. 660, dated December 23, 1953 | October 7, 1963 |
| 55 | Abolishing the President's Law Enforcement Unit for Southern Philippines (PLEUSP) and transferring its functions to the Presidential Committee on Administration Performance Efficiency (PCAPE) | October 21, 1963 |
| 56 | Directing the hoisting of the National Flag at the Independence Flagpole at the Luneta twenty-four hours a day | November 6, 1963 |
| 57 | Providing instructions to be followed in the conduct of public affairs during the time that the president is outside the Philippines | November 24, 1963 |
| 58 | Amending Executive Order No. 113, series of 1955, establishing the classification of roads | December 19, 1963 |
| 59 | Amending Executive Order No. 113, series of 1955, establishing the classification of roads | December 19, 1963 |
| 60 | Nagpapahayag na ang Pambansang Awit ng Pilipinas ay dapat awitin lamang sa titik nitong Pilipino; lit. 'Declaring that the National Anthem of the Philippines should only be sung in its Pilipino lyrics' | December 19, 1963 |
| 61 | Amending Executive Order No. 42, current series, declaring certain municipal districts in the Philippines as municipalities so as to include therein Alilem, Angaki, San Emilio, and Suyo, all of Ilocos Sur, and Matungao, Lanao del Norte | December 31, 1963 |

== 1964 ==
| No. | Title | Date signed |
|---|---|---|
| 62 | Creating the Rice and Corn Authority | January 15, 1964 |
| 63 | Amending further Executive Order No. 72, dated December 3, 1936, establishing a classification of ports | January 15, 1964 |
| 64 | Opening the port of Catbalogan, Samar, as a subport of entry within the collection district of the port of San Jose, Samar | January 15, 1964 |
| 65 | Opening the port of Romblon, Romblon, as a subport of entry within the collection district of the port of Iloilo | January 15, 1964 |
| 66 | Modifying the rates of import duty on certain imported articles as provided under Republic Act Number Nineteen Hundred Thirty-Seven, otherwise known as the Tariff and Customs Code of the Philippines as amended | January 25, 1964 |
| 67 | Creating the Office of Presidential Assistant on Housing | February 5, 1964 |
| 68 | Creating the Resettlement Agency under the Presidential Assistant on Housing | February 5, 1964 |
| 69 | Designating the committee created under Executive Order No. 30, dated January 14, 1963, as the National Parks Development Committee | February 7, 1964 |
| 70 | Providing instructions to be followed in the conduct of public affairs during the time that the president is outside the Philippines | February 8, 1964 |
| 71 | Providing instructions to be followed in the conduct of public affairs during the time that the president is outside the Philippines | February 21, 1964 |
| 72 | Prescribing economy measures in the operation of the National Government | March 4, 1964 |
| 73 | Assigning the Aguinaldo Mansion in Kawit, Cavite, to the care and custody of the National Museum | March 13, 1964 |
| 74 | Declaring the Bolinao-Alaminos Road, Pangasinan, from Kilometer 237.34 to Kilometers 277.77 or a distance of 40.43 kilometers, as a national secondary road | March 19, 1964 |
| 75 | Rendering in full force and effect the plan of organization proposed by the Special Committee on Reorganization of Agencies for Land Reform for the administrative machinery of the Agricultural Land Reform Code | March 19, 1964 |
| 76 | Creating the Committee on Non-Member Agencies for Land Reform | March 19, 1964 |
| 77 | Fixing office hours during the hot season | March 30, 1964 |
| 78 | Amending Executive Order No. 62, dated January 15, 1964, entitled "Creating the Rice and Corn Authority" | April 7, 1964 |
| 79 | Designating the Rice and Corn Administration as the Government agency to undertake the importation of rice pursuant to Republic Act No. 2848 | April 13, 1964 |
| 80 | Authorizing the director of National Museum to issue rules and regulations regarding the exportation of antiques | April 20, 1964 |
| 81 | Extending the prohibition to slaughter carabaos up to December 31, 1964 | April 20, 1964 |
| 82 | Amending Executive Order No. 321 dated June 12, 1950, entitled "Prescribing the Code of the National Flag and the National Anthem of the Republic of the Philippines" | May 14, 1964 |
| 83 | Requiring all departments, bureaus, offices, agencies, instrumentalities, and political subdivisions of the Government, including the corporations owned and controlled by the Government, the Armed Forces, Government hospitals, and public educational institutions to buy through public bidding from local textile mills, whenever available, all their requirements for clothing materials | May 18, 1964 |
| 84 | Creating a Schistosomiasis Control Committee | June 1, 1964 |
| 85 | Re-creating the Peace and Amelioration Fund Commission | June 8, 1964 |
| 86 | Providing instructions to be followed in the conduct of public affairs during the time that the president is outside the Philippines | June 12, 1964 |
| 87 | Directing the hoisting of the National Flag at the Legislative Building twenty-four hours a day | June 12, 1964 |
| 88 | Creating the Finance Academy of the Philippines | July 10, 1964 |
| 89 | Creating the Sugar Development Committee under the Office of the President | July 10, 1964 |
| 90 | Abolishing the Presidential Committee on Administration Performance Efficiency (PCAPE) | August 12, 1964 |
| 91 | Implementing Republic Act Numbered Thirty-Six Hundred and One, entitled "An Act creating the National Irrigation Administration" | August 13, 1964 |
| 92 | Opening the port of Surigao, Surigao del Norte, as a subport of entry within the collection district of the port of Masao | September 4, 1964 |
| 93 | Creating the municipality of Nilo in the province of Zamboanga del Sur | September 4, 1964 |
| 94 | Creating the municipality of Midsalip in the province of Zamboanga del Sur | September 4, 1964 |
| 95 | Creating the municipality of Pitogo in the province of Zamboanga del Sur | September 4, 1964 |
| 96 | Creating the municipality of Maruing in the province of Zamboanga del Sur | September 4, 1964 |
| 97 | Creating the municipality of Naga in the province of Zamboanga del Sur | September 4, 1964 |
| 98 | Amending Executive Order No. 91, dated August 13, 1964, entitled "Implementing Republic Act Numbered Thirty-Six Hundred and One, entitled 'An Act creating the National Irrigation Administration'" | September 15, 1964 |
| 99 | Creating the municipality of Sebaste in the province of Antique | September 26, 1964 |
| 100 | Creating the municipality of Molugan in the province of Misamis Oriental | September 26, 1964 |
| 101 | Creating the municipality of Malixi in the province of Surigao del Sur | September 28, 1964 |
| 102 | Creating the municipality of Roxas in the province of Davao | September 28, 1964 |
| 103 | Creating the municipality of Magsaysay in the province of Davao | September 28, 1964 |
| 104 | Creating the municipality of Sta. Maria in the province of Davao | September 28, 1964 |
| 105 | Creating the municipality of Badiangan in the province of Iloilo | September 28, 1964 |
| 106 | Creating the municipality of Mina in the province of Iloilo | October 1, 1964 |
| 107 | Creating the municipality of Andong in the province of Lanao del Sur | October 1, 1964 |
| 108 | Creating the municipality of Sultan Alonto in the province of Lanao del Sur | October 1, 1964 |
| 109 | Creating the municipality of Maguing in the province of Lanao del Sur | October 1, 1964 |
| 110 | Creating the municipality of Dianaton in the province of Lanao del Sur | October 1, 1964 |
| 111 | Creating the municipal district of Elpidio Quirino in Mountain Province | October 1, 1964 |
| 112 | Creating the municipality of Bayog in the province of Zamboanga del Sur | October 1, 1964 |
| 113 | Creating the municipality of Maasim in the province of Cotabato | October 1, 1964 |
| 114 | Creating the municipality of Siayan in the province of Zamboanga del Norte | October 1, 1964 |
| 115 | Creating the municipality of Roxas in the province of Zamboanga del Norte | October 1, 1964 |
| 116 | Creating the municipality of Panganuran in the province of Zamboanga del Norte | October 1, 1964 |
| 117 | Creating the municipality of Gloria in the province of Oriental Mindoro | October 1, 1964 |
| 118 | Creating the municipality of Kalilangan in the province of Bukidnon | October 1, 1964 |
| 119 | Creating the municipality of Lantapan in the province of Bukidnon | October 1, 1964 |
| 120 | Creating the municipality of Libertad in the province of Zamboanga del Sur | October 1, 1964 |
| 121 | Creating the municipality of General Aguinaldo in the province of Zamboanga del Sur | October 31, 1964 |
| 122 | Providing instructions to be followed in the conduct of public affairs during the time that the president is outside the Philippines | October 3, 1964 |
| 123 | Readjusting the boundary line between the municipalities of Maigo and Bacolod, both of the province of Lanao del Norte, by revoking Executive Order No. 342, dated June 26, 1959 | October 3, 1964 |
| 124 | Creating the municipality of Rizal in the province of Surigao del Norte | October 3, 1964 |
| 125 | Transferring the seat of government of the municipality of Prosperidad in the province of Agusan, from its present site at the barrio of Prosperidad to the barrio of Bahbah, same municipality | October 23, 1964 |
| 126 | Creating the municipality of Tigao in the province of Surigao del Sur | October 23, 1964 |
| 127 | Creating the municipality of Tampakan in the province of Cotabato | October 26, 1964 |
| 128 | Creating the municipality of Maco in the province of Davao | October 29, 1964 |
| 129 | Creating the municipality of New Corella in the province of Davao | October 29, 1964 |
| 130 | Creating the National Traffic Safety Advisory Committee to plan, study, and recommend measures for the promotion of traffic safety | November 24, 1964 |
| 131 | Amending Executive Order No. 106, dated October 1, 1964, creating the municipality of Mina in the province of Iloilo | December 1, 1964 |
| 132 | Amending Executive Order No. 108, dated October 1, 1964, creating the municipality of Sultan Alonto in the province of Lanao del Sur | December 2, 1964 |
| 133 | Transferring the seat of government of the municipality of Burgos in the province of Ilocos Sur from its present site at the barrio of Luna to the barrio of Bato, same municipality | December 3, 1964 |
| 134 | Creating the Philippine National Volunteer Service Committee | December 17, 1964 |
| 135 | Further amending Executive Order No. 36, series of 1963, creating the Loans and Investment Council | December 24, 1964 |

== 1965 ==
| No. | Title | Date signed |
|---|---|---|
| 136 | Authorizing the importation of rice and designating the Rice and Corn Administration as the Government agency to undertake such importation pursuant to Republic Act No. 2207 | January 5, 1965 |
| 137 | Revising Executive Order No. 321, dated June 12, 1950, entitled "Prescribing the Code of the National Flag and the National Anthem of the Republic of the Philippines" | January 7, 1965 |
| 138 | Creating the Committee on Wood Industries Development under the Office of the President | January 8, 1965 |
| 139 | Creating a National Committee on the Safe Transport of Radioactive Materials | February 22, 1965 |
| 140 | Defining and fixing the boundaries of the municipality of Gloria in the province of Oriental Mindoro | February 25, 1965 |
| 141 | Amending Section 15 of Executive Order No. 135, dated May 4, 1948, entitled "Regulating the establishment, maintenance and operation of frontons and basque pelota games (jai-alai)" | February 26, 1965 |
| 142 | Opening the port of Catbalogan, Samar, as a subport of entry within the collection district of the port of San Jose, Samar | March 2, 1965 |
| 143 | Creating the municipality of Kiblawan in the province of Davao | March 5, 1965 |
| 144 | Amending Executive Order No. 83, dated May 18, 1964, entitled "Requiring all departments, bureaus, offices, agencies, instrumentalities and political subdivisions of the Government, including the corporations owned and controlled by the Government, the Armed Forces, Government hospitals, and public educational institutions to buy through public bidding from local textile mills, whenever available, all their requirements for clothing materials" | March 6, 1965 |
| 145 | Fixing office hours during the hot season | March 20, 1965 |
| 146 | Enjoining all officers and employees of the executive branch of the Government to cooperate in the drive against smuggled products and to desist from buying, possessing or using them and appealing to the public for cooperation | March 20, 1965 |
| 147 | Declaring certain municipal districts in the province of Agusan as municipalities | March 31, 1965 |
| 148 | Opening the port of Basilan, as a subport of entry within the collection district of the port of Zamboanga | April 1, 1965 |
| 149 | Opening the port of San Vicente, Sta. Ana, Cagayan, as a subport of entry within the collection district of the port of Aparri | April 1, 1965 |
| 150 | Amending Executive Order No. 76, dated May 19, 1964, entitled "Creating the Committee on Non-Member Agencies for Land Reform" | April 4, 1965 |
| 151 | Revising Executive Order No. 26 dated December 11, 1962, entitled "Reorganizing the Lighthouse Board" | April 4, 1965 |
| 152 | Creating the Committee on Philippine Petroleum Exploration Industry | April 8, 1965 |
| 153 | Extending the prohibition to slaughter carabaos up to December 31, 1965 | April 12, 1965 |
| 154 | Further amending Executive Order No. 72, dated December 3, 1936, as amended by Executive Order No. 383, dated March 11, 1963, establishing a classification of ports | April 26, 1965 |
| 155 | Amending Executive Order No. 153, dated April 12, 1965, on the slaughter of carabaos | May 10, 1965 |
| 156 | Transferring the seat of government of the municipality of Dinaig in the province of Cotabato from its present site at the barrio of Capiton to the barrio of Dalican, same municipality | May 27, 1965 |
| 157 | Declaring the municipal district of Jipapad in the province of Samar as a municipality | July 16, 1965 |
| 158 | Revoking Executive Order No. 375, issued on February 9, 1960, entitled, "Transferring the seat of government of the municipality of Milagros, province of Masbate, from the present site at the poblacion to the sitio of Bonbon, same municipality | July 24, 1965 |
| 159 | Creating the Bicol Development Planning Board | July 27, 1965 |
| 160 | Opening the port of Dadiangas, General Santos, Cotabato, as a subport of entry within the collection district of the port of Davao | August 6, 1965 |
| 161 | Creating the municipality of Don Carlos in the province of Bukidnon | August 17, 1965 |
| 162 | Modifying the rates of import duty on certain imported articles as provided under Republic Act Number Nineteen Hundred Thirty-Seven, otherwise known as the Tariff and Customs Code of the Philippines as amended | August 17, 1965 |
| 163 | Opening the port of Toledo city, as a subport of entry within the collection district of the port of Cebu | August 18, 1965 |
| 164 | Declaring the municipal district of Tubo in the province of Abra as a municipality | August 18, 1965 |
| 165 | Creating the municipal advisory health council | August 27, 1965 |
| 166 | Declaring the municipal district of Piagapo in the province of Lanao del Sur as a municipality | August 27, 1965 |
| 167 | Amending Executive Order No. 114, series of 1964, creating the municipality of Siayan in the province of Zamboanga del Norte | September 2, 1965 |
| 168 | Authorizing the establishment of the Maligaya Rice Research and Training Center of the Philippines at the Maligaya Experiment Station of the Bureau of Plant Industry, Department of Agriculture and Natural Resources and defining its objectives | September 3, 1965 |
| 169 | Creating the Coconut Development Committee under the Office of the President | September 6, 1965 |
| 170 | Creating the municipality of Santiago in the province of Southern Leyte | September 10, 1965 |
| 171 | Modifying the rates of import duty on certain imported articles as provided under Republic Act Number Nineteen Hundred Thirty-Seven, otherwise known as the Tariff and Customs Code of the Philippines as amended | September 22, 1965 |
| 172 | Creating the Labor Code Committee | October 4, 1965 |
| 173 | Declaring the "Casa Real" at Malolos, Bulacan, a national shrine | October 4, 1965 |
| 174 | Declaring the municipal district of San Andres in the province of Quezon as a municipality | October 5, 1965 |
| 175 | Creating the municipalities of Pandami and Laminusa in the province of Sulu | October 14, 1965 |
| 176 | Creating the municipality of Mabuhay in the province of Zamboanga del Sur | October 9, 1965 |
| 177 | Creating the municipality of Cabatan in the province of Zamboanga del Sur | October 9, 1965 |
| 178 | Creating the municipality of Surabay in the province of Zamboanga del Sur | October 9, 1965 |
| 179 | Creating the municipality of Ditay in the province of Zamboanga del Sur | October 9, 1965 |
| 180 | Creating the municipality of Diplahan in the province of Zamboanga del Sur | October 9, 1965 |
| 181 | Creating the municipality of Bawang in the province of Zamboanga del Sur | October 9, 1965 |
| 182 | Creating the municipality of San Isidro in the province of Davao | October 9, 1965 |
| 183 | Creating the municipality of Tarragona in the province of Davao | October 9, 1965 |
| 184 | Creating the municipality of Kaputian in the province of Davao | October 9, 1965 |
| 185 | Creating the municipality of Lourdes in the province of Oriental Mindoro | October 14, 1965 |
| 186 | Amending Executive Order No. 156 dated January 6, 1956, and providing additional powers and duties to the Presidential Assistant on Community Development | October 15, 1965 |
| 187 | Creating the municipality of Bagumbayan in the province of Cotabato | October 24, 1965 |
| 188 | Creating the municipality of New Bataan in the province of Davao | November 2, 1965 |
| 189 | Creating the municipality of Carmen in the province of Davao | November 2, 1965 |
| 190 | Defining the boundaries of the city of Palayan | November 6, 1965 |
| 191 | Declaring the municipal port of Poctoy, Odiongan, Romblon, as a national port open to coastwise trade | November 12, 1965 |
| 192 | Opening the port of Pasacao, Camarines Sur, as a subport of entry within the collection district of the port of Jose Panganiban, Camarines Norte | November 12, 1965 |
| 193 | Creating the municipality of Limasawa in the province of Southern Leyte | October 24, 1965 |
| 194 | Creating the municipality of San Ricardo in the province of Southern Leyte | October 24, 1965 |
| 195 | Changing the par value of the peso for US$0.50 to US$0.2564103 (U.S. dollar of the weight and fineness in effect on July 1, 1944) | November 6, 1965 |
| 196 | Creating the municipality of Mangagoy in the province of Surigao del Sur | November 17, 1965 |
| 197 | Creating the municipality of Carmen in the province of Surigao del Sur | November 17, 1965 |
| 198 | Creating the municipality of Kitaotao in the province of Bukidnon | November 18, 1965 |
| 199 | Creating the municipality of Pulangi in the province of Bukidnon | November 18, 1965 |
| 200 | Directing the Board of Liquidators to acquire, administer and dispose of certain real property of the Philippine National Railways | November 18, 1965 |
| 201 | Creating the municipality of Eva in the province of Bohol | November 18, 1965 |
| 202 | Creating the municipal districts of Cabanglasan and Tikalaan in the province of Bukidnon | November 18, 1965 |
| 203 | Creating the municipality of P. Dupaya in the province of Cagayan | November 20, 1965 |
| 204 | Increasing the base pay of the Chief of Staff, Armed Forces of the Philippines | November 20, 1965 |
| 205 | Creating the municipality of Tamblot in the province of Bohol | November 22, 1965 |
| 206 | Revoking Executive Order No. 185 issued on October 14, 1965, entitled "Creating the municipality of Lourdes in the province of Oriental Mindoro" | November 22, 1965 |
| 207 | Creating the municipality of Alegria in the province of Surigao del Norte | November 22, 1965 |
| 208 | Revoking Executive Order No. 35 issued on February 28, 1963, entitled "Transferring the seat of government of the municipality of Dangcagan in the province of Bukidnon from its present site at the barrio of Dangcagan to the barrio of Kitaotao, same municipality | November 23, 1965 |
| 209 | Creating the municipality of Quirino in the province of Quezon | November 26, 1965 |
| 210 | Amending Executive Order No. 184, series of 1956, insofar as the southwestern boundaries of the municipality of Dagohoy, province of Bohol, are concerned | November 29, 1965 |
| 211 | Creating the municipality of Burgos in the province of Surigao del Norte | November 29, 1965 |
| 211-A | Creating the municipality of Tuloadato in the province of Lanao del Sur | November 29, 1965 |
| 211-B | Creating the municipality of New Bad-as in the province of Surigao del Norte | November 29, 1965 |
| 211-C | Readjusting the boundaries between the municipalities of Kumalarang and Maruing in the province of Zamboanga del Sur | November 29, 1965 |
| 211-D | Creating the municipality of Bayanihan in the province of Zamboanga del Norte | November 29, 1965 |
| 211-E | Creating the municipality of Kulaman in the province of Cotabato | November 29, 1965 |
| 211-F | Creating the municipality of Quirino in the province of La Union | November 29, 1965 |
| 212 | Creating the municipality of Quirino in the province of Isabela | December 3, 1965 |
| 213 | Creating the municipality of Baclaran in the province of Rizal | December 3, 1965 |
| 214 | Creating the municipality of San Isidro in the province of Bohol | December 3, 1965 |
| 215 | Delegating to the Chief of Constabulary certain powers concerning the approval or disapproval of applications for firearm licenses and revocation thereof | December 3, 1965 |
| 216 | Amending Executive Order No. 170 dated September 10, 1965, creating the municipality of Santiago in the province of Southern Leyte | December 9, 1965 |
| 217 | Amending Executive Order No. 193 dated October 24, 1965, creating the municipality of Limasawa in the province of Southern Leyte | December 9, 1965 |
| 218 | Amending Executive Order No. 194, dated October 24, 1965, creating the municipality of San Ricardo in the province of Southern Leyte | December 9, 1965 |
| 219 | Declaring the municipal district of Magsaysay in the province of Lanao del Norte as a municipality | December 10, 1965 |
| 220 | Amending Executive Order No. 107 dated October 1, 1964, creating the municipality of Andong in the province of Lanao del Sur | December 8, 1965 |
| 221 | Creating the municipality of Tagoloan in the province of Lanao del Sur | December 8, 1965 |
| 222 | Creating the municipality of San Miguel in the province of Occidental Mindoro | December 8, 1965 |
| 223 | Creating the municipality of Buribid in the province of Lanao del Sur | December 8, 1965 |
| 224 | Creating the municipality of Bayuyungan in the province of Batangas | December 8, 1965 |
| 225 | Modifying the rates of import duty on certain imported articles as provided under Republic Act Number Nineteen Hundred Thirty-Seven, otherwise known as the Tariff and Customs Code of the Philippines as amended | December 13, 1965 |
| 226 | Amending Executive Order No. 130 dated November 24, 1964, by defining the functions and duties of the National Traffic Safety Advisory Committee created therein | December 17, 1965 |
| 227 | Creating the municipality of Tumagabok in the province of Marinduque | December 20, 1965 |
| 228 | Creating a Philippine Coordinating Committee on the Asian Development Bank | December 15, 1965 |
| 229 | Creating the Philippine Land Reform Foundation | December 29, 1965 |
