= Lanao del Sur's 1st congressional district =

Legislative district of the Philippines

- Constituency for the House of Representatives of the Philippines
- Location of Lanao del Sur within the Philippines
- Province: Lanao del Sur
- Region: Bangsamoro
- Population: 686,512 (2020)
- Electorate: 390,056 (2022)
- Major settlements: 18 LGUs: Cities; Marawi; Municipalities; Amai Manabilang; Buadiposo-Buntong; Bubong; Ditsaan-Ramain; Kapai; Lumba-Bayabao; Maguing; Marantao; Masiu; Mulondo; Piagapo; Poona Bayabao; Saguiaran; Tagoloan II; Tamparan; Taraka; Wao
- Area: 7,402.11 km^{2} (2,857.97 sq mi)

Current constituency
- Created: 1987
- Representative: Ziaur-Rahman A. Adiong
- Political party: Lakas; SIAP
- Congressional bloc: Majority

Lanao del Sur's 1st congressional district is a congressional district in the province of Lanao del Sur that has been represented in the House of Representatives of the Philippines since 1987. It covers the eastern interior municipalities bordering the provinces of Bukidnon and Cotabato as well as those along the northern shores of Lake Lanao including its capital city, Marawi. The district is currently represented in the 20th Congress by Ziaur-Rahman A. Adiong of the Lakas–CMD (Lakas) and Serbisyong Inklusibo–Alyansang Progresibo (SIAP).

== Representation history ==
#	Image	Member	Term of office		Congress	Party	Electoral history	Constituent LGUs
#	Image	Member	Start	End	Congress	Party	Electoral history	Constituent LGUs
=== Lanao del Sur's 1st district for the House of Representatives of the Philippines ===
District created February 2, 1987 from Lanao del Sur's at-large district.
1		Omar M. Dianalan	November 19, 1987	April 30, 1990	8th	Liberal	Elected in 1987. Died in office.	1987–2016; Buadiposo-Buntong, Bubong, Bumbaran, Ditsaan-Ramain, Kapai, Lumba-Bayabao, Maguing, Marantao, Marawi, Masiu, Mulondo, Piagapo, Poona Bayabao, Saguiaran, Tagoloan II, Tamparan, Taraka, Wao
—	vacant		April 30, 1990	June 30, 1992	8th	–	No special election held to fill vacancy.	1987–2016; Buadiposo-Buntong, Bubong, Bumbaran, Ditsaan-Ramain, Kapai, Lumba-Bayabao, Maguing, Marantao, Marawi, Masiu, Mulondo, Piagapo, Poona Bayabao, Saguiaran, Tagoloan II, Tamparan, Taraka, Wao
2		Mamintal Adiong Sr.	November 10, 1992	June 30, 2001	9th	Lakas	Elected in 1992.	1987–2016; Buadiposo-Buntong, Bubong, Bumbaran, Ditsaan-Ramain, Kapai, Lumba-Bayabao, Maguing, Marantao, Marawi, Masiu, Mulondo, Piagapo, Poona Bayabao, Saguiaran, Tagoloan II, Tamparan, Taraka, Wao
2		Mamintal Adiong Sr.	November 10, 1992	June 30, 2001	10th	Lakas	Re-elected in 1995.	1987–2016; Buadiposo-Buntong, Bubong, Bumbaran, Ditsaan-Ramain, Kapai, Lumba-Bayabao, Maguing, Marantao, Marawi, Masiu, Mulondo, Piagapo, Poona Bayabao, Saguiaran, Tagoloan II, Tamparan, Taraka, Wao
2		Mamintal Adiong Sr.	November 10, 1992	June 30, 2001	11th	Lakas	Re-elected in 1998.	1987–2016; Buadiposo-Buntong, Bubong, Bumbaran, Ditsaan-Ramain, Kapai, Lumba-Bayabao, Maguing, Marantao, Marawi, Masiu, Mulondo, Piagapo, Poona Bayabao, Saguiaran, Tagoloan II, Tamparan, Taraka, Wao
3		Faysah M. Dumarpa	June 30, 2001	June 30, 2010	12th	Lakas	Elected in 2001.	1987–2016; Buadiposo-Buntong, Bubong, Bumbaran, Ditsaan-Ramain, Kapai, Lumba-Bayabao, Maguing, Marantao, Marawi, Masiu, Mulondo, Piagapo, Poona Bayabao, Saguiaran, Tagoloan II, Tamparan, Taraka, Wao
3		Faysah M. Dumarpa	June 30, 2001	June 30, 2010	13th	Lakas	Re-elected in 2004.	1987–2016; Buadiposo-Buntong, Bubong, Bumbaran, Ditsaan-Ramain, Kapai, Lumba-Bayabao, Maguing, Marantao, Marawi, Masiu, Mulondo, Piagapo, Poona Bayabao, Saguiaran, Tagoloan II, Tamparan, Taraka, Wao
3		Faysah M. Dumarpa	June 30, 2001	June 30, 2010	14th	Nacionalista	Re-elected in 2007.	1987–2016; Buadiposo-Buntong, Bubong, Bumbaran, Ditsaan-Ramain, Kapai, Lumba-Bayabao, Maguing, Marantao, Marawi, Masiu, Mulondo, Piagapo, Poona Bayabao, Saguiaran, Tagoloan II, Tamparan, Taraka, Wao
4		Mohammed Hussein Pangandaman	November 15, 2010	June 30, 2013	15th	Lakas	Elected in 2010.	1987–2016; Buadiposo-Buntong, Bubong, Bumbaran, Ditsaan-Ramain, Kapai, Lumba-Bayabao, Maguing, Marantao, Marawi, Masiu, Mulondo, Piagapo, Poona Bayabao, Saguiaran, Tagoloan II, Tamparan, Taraka, Wao
4		Mohammed Hussein Pangandaman	November 15, 2010	June 30, 2013	15th	Independent	Elected in 2010.	1987–2016; Buadiposo-Buntong, Bubong, Bumbaran, Ditsaan-Ramain, Kapai, Lumba-Bayabao, Maguing, Marantao, Marawi, Masiu, Mulondo, Piagapo, Poona Bayabao, Saguiaran, Tagoloan II, Tamparan, Taraka, Wao
5		Ansaruddin Alonto Adiong	June 30, 2013	June 30, 2022	16th	Liberal (SIAP)	Elected in 2013.	1987–2016; Buadiposo-Buntong, Bubong, Bumbaran, Ditsaan-Ramain, Kapai, Lumba-Bayabao, Maguing, Marantao, Marawi, Masiu, Mulondo, Piagapo, Poona Bayabao, Saguiaran, Tagoloan II, Tamparan, Taraka, Wao
5		Ansaruddin Alonto Adiong	June 30, 2013	June 30, 2022	17th	PDP–Laban (SIAP)	Re-elected in 2016.	2016–present Amai Manabilang, Buadiposo-Buntong, Bubong, Ditsaan-Ramain, Kapai, Lumba-Bayabao, Maguing, Marantao, Marawi, Masiu, Mulondo, Piagapo, Poona Bayabao, Saguiaran, Tagoloan II, Tamparan, Taraka, Wao
5		Ansaruddin Alonto Adiong	June 30, 2013	June 30, 2022	18th	Nacionalista (SIAP)	Re-elected in 2019.	2016–present Amai Manabilang, Buadiposo-Buntong, Bubong, Ditsaan-Ramain, Kapai, Lumba-Bayabao, Maguing, Marantao, Marawi, Masiu, Mulondo, Piagapo, Poona Bayabao, Saguiaran, Tagoloan II, Tamparan, Taraka, Wao
6		Zia Alonto Adiong	June 30, 2022	Incumbent	19th	Lakas (SIAP)	Elected in 2022.	2016–present Amai Manabilang, Buadiposo-Buntong, Bubong, Ditsaan-Ramain, Kapai, Lumba-Bayabao, Maguing, Marantao, Marawi, Masiu, Mulondo, Piagapo, Poona Bayabao, Saguiaran, Tagoloan II, Tamparan, Taraka, Wao
6		Zia Alonto Adiong	June 30, 2022	Incumbent	20th	Lakas (SIAP)	Re-elected in 2025.	2016–present Amai Manabilang, Buadiposo-Buntong, Bubong, Ditsaan-Ramain, Kapai, Lumba-Bayabao, Maguing, Marantao, Marawi, Masiu, Mulondo, Piagapo, Poona Bayabao, Saguiaran, Tagoloan II, Tamparan, Taraka, Wao

== Election results ==
=== 2025 ===
Candidate	Party	Votes	%
Zia Alonto Adiong (incumbent)	Lakas–CMD	210,376	70.76
Abofarhan Hadjiomar	United Bangsamoro Justice Party	76,569	25.76
Macloc Dagalangit	Workers' and Peasants' Party	9,263	3.12
Gebson Macabato	Independent	1,087	0.37
Total		297,295	100.00
Valid votes		297,295	90.54
Invalid/blank votes		31,047	9.46
Total votes		328,342	100.00
Registered voters/turnout		403,831	81.31
Lakas–CMD hold			
Source: Commission on Elections

=== 2022 ===
Candidate	Party	Votes	%
Zia Alonto Adiong	Lakas–CMD	223,631	83.83
Fatani Abdul Malik	Ummah Party	29,043	10.89
Ansaroden Lucman Moner	Independent	5,833	2.19
Sultan Bert Mustapha	Reform Party	5,387	2.02
Mohammad Razuman	Independent	2,870	1.08
Total		266,764	100.00
Total votes		312,809	–
Registered voters/turnout		390,056	80.20
Lakas–CMD gain from Nacionalista Party			
Source: Commission on Elections

=== 2016 ===
2016 Philippine House of Representatives elections
Party	Candidate	Votes	%
Liberal	Ansarrudin Abdulmalik Alonto-Adiong		
UNA	Faysah Dumarpa		
PBM	Calawanan Otara		
Independent	Mar Paiso		
Total votes			

=== 2013 ===
2013 Philippine House of Representatives elections
Party	Candidate	Votes	%	±%
Liberal	Ansaruddin Alonto Adiong			
PDP–Laban	Faysah Dumarpa			
Independent	Hussein Pangandaman			
Independent	Monaoray Saripada			
Margin of victory				
Rejected ballots				
Turnout				
Liberal gain from Independent		Swing		

=== 2010 ===
2010 Philippine House of Representatives elections
Party	Candidate	Votes	%
Lakas–Kampi	Mohammed Hussein Pacasum Pangandaman	88,084	
Nacionalista	Salic Dumarpa	84,636	
Independent	Princess Johyra Pangarungan		
PMP	Salic Mundir		
Independent	Abul Khayr Alonto		
Total votes			
Lakas–Kampi gain from Nacionalista			

== See also ==
- Legislative districts of Lanao del Sur
