= Tagoloan =

Tagoloan is the name of three places in the Philippines:

- Tagoloan, Lanao del Norte
- Tagoloan, Lanao del Sur (also known as Tagoloan II)
- Tagoloan, Misamis Oriental
