= Lanao del Sur's 3rd parliamentary district =

Parliamentary district for the Bangsamoro Parliament

- Constituency for the Bangsamoro Parliament
- Boundary of Lanao del Sur's 3rd parliamentary district in Lanao del Sur
- Province: Lanao del Sur
- Population: 129,069 (2024)
- Electorate: 93,251 (2026)

Current constituency
- Member of Parliament: Rauf Adiong (elect)
- Political party: SIAP

Lanao del Sur's 3rd parliamentary district is the third of the nine parliamentary districts of the province of Lanao del Sur for the Bangsamoro Parliament. It is composed of the municipalities of Buadiposo-Buntong, Bubong, Ditsaan-Ramain, Maguing, and Tagoloan.

Rauf Adiong of the SIAP Party is the member of Parliament-elect for the district following the inaugural 2026 Bangsamoro Parliament election. He will assume office on October 30, 2026.

== List of MPs representing the district ==
No.	Portrait	Member (Lifespan)	Term of office	Party	Parliament	Electoral history	Constituencies
1		Rauf Adiong (born 1996)	Assuming office on October 30, 2026	SIAP	1st Parliament	Elected in 2026.	2026–present Buadiposo-Buntong, Bubong, Ditsaan-Ramain, Maguing, Tagoloan

== Election results ==
=== 2026 ===
2026 Bangsamoro Parliament election in Lanao del Sur
Party	Candidate	Votes	%
SIAP	Rauf Adiong	55,714	66.62
Independent	Edrieza Rimbang	19,996	23.91
UBJP	James Macaraya	7,628	9.12
Independent	Saleha Mangurun	287	0.34
Total votes		83,625	100.00
SIAP win (new seat)			
