= Pantuwaraya Lake National Park =

National park in Lanao del Sur, Philippines

- IUCN category V (protected landscape/seascape)
- Location within Mindanao mainland Location within Philippines
- Location: Lanao del Sur, Philippines
- Nearest city: Marawi, Lanao del Sur, Philippines
- Coordinates: 7°59′N 124°29′E
- Area: 20 hectares (49 acres)
- Established: May 5, 1965
- Governing body: Department of Environment and Natural Resources

Pantuwaraya Lake National Park is a protected area of the Philippines located in barangay Pantao Raya in the municipality of Saguiaran, Lanao del Sur. The park covers an area of 20 hectares comprising Lake Pantao Raya and the surrounding area. It was declared a national park in 1965 by virtue of Republic Act No. 4190.

The park's location in the Lake Lanao-Agus River Watershed Area makes it an important site for conservation efforts. This area supplies much of the region's water and powers the Agus Hydroelectric Power Plant that provides 70% of Mindanao's electricity. The park is accessible via the Iligan-Marawi road which also contains other important lakes and reservoirs in its vicinity including Basak Lake, Laguna de Calaganan, Talao Lake and Agus Lake.

== See also ==
- List of national parks of the Philippines
