= Ditsaan-Ramain =

Municipality in Lanao del Sur, Philippines

Ditsaan-Ramain ديتساعن راماين Ditsa-an Ramain
- Municipality
- Municipality of Ditsaan-Ramain
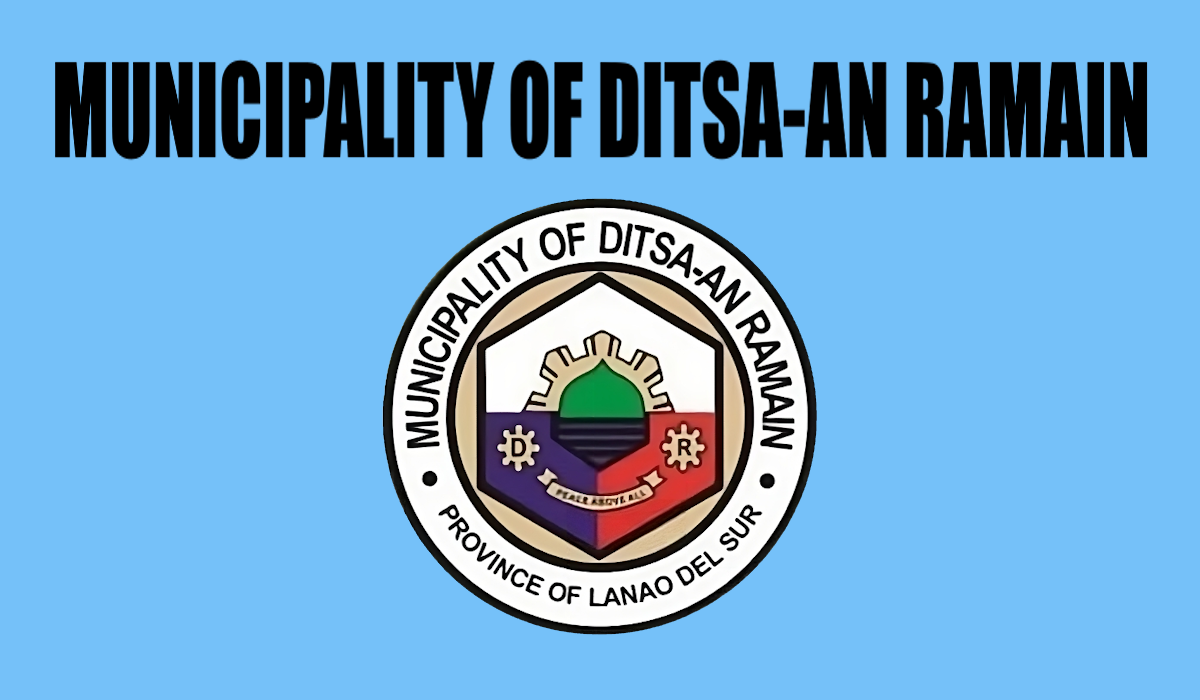
- Flag

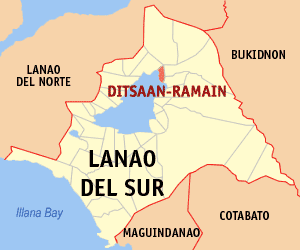
- Map of Lanao del Sur with Ditsaan-Ramain highlighted
- Interactive map of Ditsaan-Ramain
- Location within the Philippines
- Coordinates: 7°58′43″N 124°21′18″E
- Country: Philippines
- Region: Bangsamoro Autonomous Region in Muslim Mindanao
- Province: Lanao del Sur
- House district: 1st district
- Parliamentary district: 3rd district
- Founded: February 13, 1956
- Barangays: 35 (see Barangays)

Government
  - Type: Sangguniang Bayan
  - Mayor: Ansaruddin Alonto Adiong
  - Vice Mayor: Abdul Jabbar G. Dida-agun
  - House Representative: Ziaur-Rahman A. Adiong
  - Municipal Council: Members: Nurbani Bin Jamel C. Macaraya; Kamalodin, Malawad; Nixon, Macmac; Saanodin, Macarampat; Hadji Said T. Dalomanding; Otowa A. Hadji Ali; Arsad P. Bubong; Hadji Latiph Raongan B. Batua-an
  - Electorate: 23,528 voters (2025)

Area
  - Total: 527.98 km^{2} (203.85 sq mi)
- Elevation: 727 m (2,385 ft)
- Highest elevation: 1,028 m (3,373 ft)
- Lowest elevation: 695 m (2,280 ft)

Population (2024 census)
  - Total: 26,918
  - Density: 50.983/km^{2} (132.05/sq mi)
  - Households: 3,512

Economy
  - Income class: 2nd municipal income class
  - Poverty incidence: 16.61% (2023)
  - Revenue: ₱ 199 million (2024)
  - Assets: ₱ 154 million (2024)
  - Expenditure: ₱ 224.2 million (2024)
  - Liabilities: ₱ 140 million (2024)

Service provider
  - Electricity: Lanao del Sur Electric Cooperative (LASURECO)
- Time zone: UTC+8 (PST)
- ZIP code: 9713
- PSGC: 1903624000
- IDD : area code: +63 (0)63
- Native languages: Maranao; Tagalog
- Website: www.ditsaanramain-lds.gov.ph

Ditsaan-Ramain, officially the Municipality of Ditsaan-Ramain (Maranao: Inged a Ditsaan-Ramain; Tagalog: Bayan ng Ditsaan-Ramain), is a municipality in the province of Lanao del Sur, Philippines. According to the 2024 census, it has a population of 26,918 people.

== History ==
Ditsaan-Ramain is part of the SHAKBA (Bubong, Buadi-Puso, Ditsa-an Ramain and Kapai). SHAKBA is a Maranao word which means links or interconnection. Shakba has many rivers and links to each other and this is where the name derives. Ditsa-an Ramain (shakba) is considered as peaceful among the municipalities of the province.

== Geography ==
=== Barangays ===
Ditsaan-Ramain is politically subdivided into 35 barangays. Each barangay consists of puroks while some have sitios.

- Bago a Ingud
- Bayabao
- Buada Babai
- Buadi Alao
- Buadi Oloc
- Pagalongan Buadi Dingan
- Dado
- Dangimprampiai
- Darimbang
- Dilausan
- Ditsaan Proper
- Gadongan
- Pagalongan Ginaopan
- Barimbingan
- Baclayan Lilod
- Baclayan Raya
- Buayaan Lilod
- Bubong Dangiprampiai
- Buayaan Raya
- Linamon
- Lumbatan Ramain
- Buayaan Madanding
- Maindig Ditsaan
- Mandara
- Maranao Timber
- Pagalongan Proper
- Pagalongan Masioon
- Polo
- Pugaan
- Ramain Poblacion
- Ramain Proper
- Rantian
- Sundiga Bayabao
- Talub
- Sultan Pangadapan
- Upper Pugaan

=== Climate ===
Climate data for Ditsaan-Ramain, Lanao de Sur
Month	Jan	Feb	Mar	Apr	May	Jun	Jul	Aug	Sep	Oct	Nov	Dec	Year
Mean daily maximum °C (°F)	24 (75)	24 (75)	25 (77)	26 (79)	26 (79)	25 (77)	25 (77)	25 (77)	25 (77)	25 (77)	25 (77)	25 (77)	25 (77)
Mean daily minimum °C (°F)	20 (68)	20 (68)	20 (68)	20 (68)	21 (70)	21 (70)	20 (68)	20 (68)	20 (68)	21 (70)	20 (68)	20 (68)	20 (69)
Average precipitation mm (inches)	159 (6.3)	143 (5.6)	166 (6.5)	183 (7.2)	357 (14.1)	414 (16.3)	333 (13.1)	309 (12.2)	289 (11.4)	285 (11.2)	253 (10.0)	166 (6.5)	3,057 (120.4)
Average rainy days	18.4	17.2	20.6	23.4	29.3	29.2	29.9	29.4	27.7	28.7	25.5	19.9	299.2
Source: Meteoblue (modeled/calculated data, not measured locally)

== Demographics ==
Population census of Ditsaan-Ramain
Year	Pop.	±% p.a.
1918	3,929	—
1939	5,981	+2.02%
1948	9,983	+5.86%
1960	14,310	+3.05%
1970	16,331	+1.33%
1975	20,088	+4.24%
1980	11,024	−11.30%
1990	13,332	+1.92%
1995	16,285	+3.82%
2000	19,157	+3.54%
2007	25,425	+3.98%
2010	20,208	−8.02%
2015	22,299	+1.89%
2020	24,406	+1.92%
2024	26,918	+2.38%
Source: Philippine Statistics Authority

== Economy ==
Poverty Incidence of Ditsaan-Ramain

Source: Philippine Statistics Authority
