= Bubong =

Municipality in Lanao del Sur, Philippines

Bubong بوبونج
- Municipality
- Municipality of Bubong
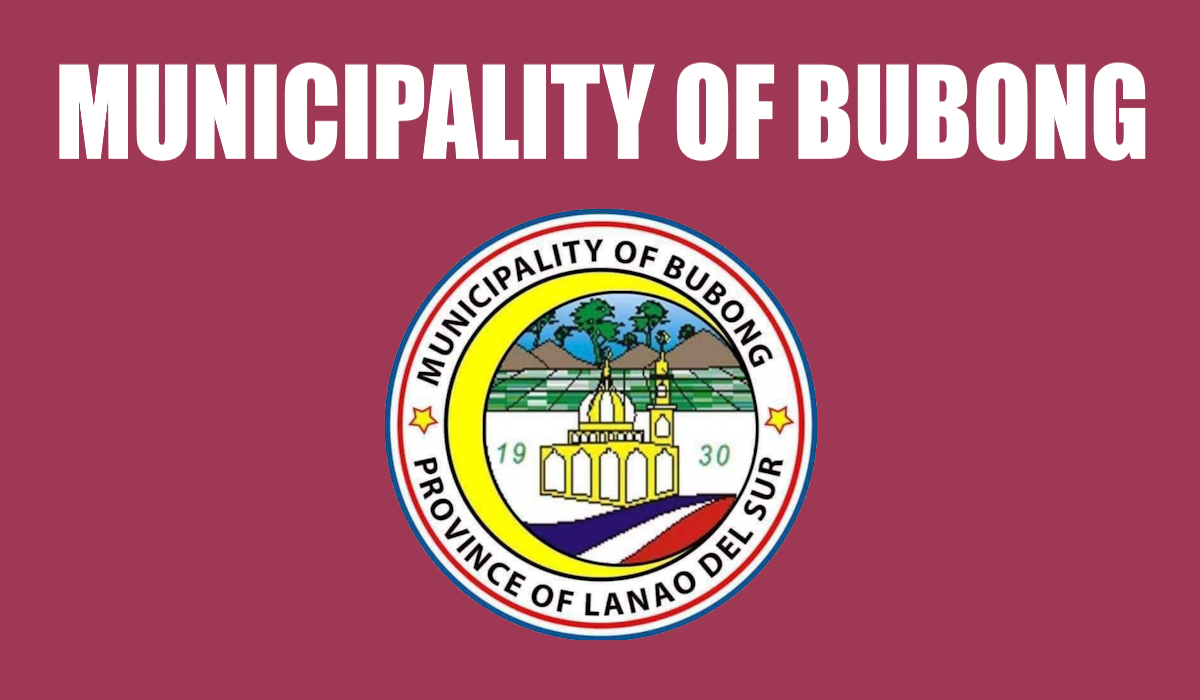
- Flag Seal

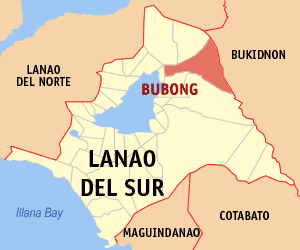
- Map of Lanao del Sur with Bubong highlighted
- Interactive map of Bubong
- Location within the Philippines
- Coordinates: 7°58′59″N 124°23′08″E
- Country: Philippines
- Region: Bangsamoro Autonomous Region in Muslim Mindanao
- Province: Lanao del Sur
- House district: 1st district
- Parliamentary district: 3rd district
- Barangays: 36 (see Barangays)

Government
  - Type: Sangguniang Bayan
  - Mayor: Alfais T. Munder
  - Vice Mayor: Nasmerah M. Nasser
  - House Representative: Ziaur-Rahman A. Adiong
  - Municipal Council: Members: Algary S. Abdulbocua; Al-Hizam S. Malik; Mesug A. Tomali; Amer-Hussien T. Diamla; Nasrima R. Sarip; Azisali S. Munder; Abdulghaffar M. Diamla II; Abdul Rashid A. Manua
  - Electorate: 14,151 voters (2025)

Area
  - Total: 798.50 km^{2} (308.30 sq mi)
- Elevation: 771 m (2,530 ft)
- Highest elevation: 1,039 m (3,409 ft)
- Lowest elevation: 664 m (2,178 ft)

Population (2024 census)
  - Total: 28,733
  - Density: 35.984/km^{2} (93.197/sq mi)
  - Households: 3,775

Economy
  - Income class: 1st municipal income class
  - Poverty incidence: 16.01% (2023)
  - Revenue: ₱ 309.9 million (2024)
  - Assets: ₱ 474.5 million (2024)
  - Expenditure: ₱ 237 million (2024)
  - Liabilities: ₱ 121.8 million (2024)

Service provider
  - Electricity: Lanao del Sur Electric Cooperative (LASURECO)
- Time zone: UTC+8 (PST)
- ZIP code: 9708
- PSGC: 1903606000
- IDD : area code: +63 (0)63
- Native languages: Maranao; Tagalog

Bubong, officially the Municipality of Bubong (Maranao and Iranun: Inged a Bubong; Tagalog: Bayan ng Bubong), is a municipality in the province of Lanao del Sur, Philippines. According to the 2024 census, it has a population of 28,733 people.

== Geography ==
=== Barangays ===
Bubong is politically subdivided into 36 barangays. Each barangay consists of puroks while some have sitios.

- Bagoaingud
- Bansayan
- Basingan
- Batangan
- Bualan
- Poblacion (Bubong)
- Bubonga Didagun
- Carigongan
- Bacolod
- Dilabayan
- Dimapatoy
- Dimayon Proper
- Diolangan
- Guiguikun
- Dibarosan
- Madanding
- Malungun
- Masorot
- Matampay Dimarao
- Miabalawag
- Montiaan
- Pagayawan
- Palao
- Panalawan
- Pantar
- Pindoguan
- Polayagan
- Ramain Bubong
- Rogero
- Salipongan
- Sunggod
- Taboro
- Dalaon
- Dimayon
- Pindolonan
- Punud

=== Climate ===
Climate data for Bubong, Lanao del Sur
Month	Jan	Feb	Mar	Apr	May	Jun	Jul	Aug	Sep	Oct	Nov	Dec	Year
Mean daily maximum °C (°F)	24 (75)	24 (75)	25 (77)	26 (79)	26 (79)	25 (77)	25 (77)	25 (77)	25 (77)	25 (77)	25 (77)	25 (77)	25 (77)
Mean daily minimum °C (°F)	20 (68)	20 (68)	20 (68)	20 (68)	21 (70)	21 (70)	20 (68)	20 (68)	20 (68)	21 (70)	20 (68)	20 (68)	20 (69)
Average precipitation mm (inches)	159 (6.3)	143 (5.6)	166 (6.5)	183 (7.2)	357 (14.1)	414 (16.3)	333 (13.1)	309 (12.2)	289 (11.4)	285 (11.2)	253 (10.0)	166 (6.5)	3,057 (120.4)
Average rainy days	18.4	17.2	20.6	23.4	29.3	29.2	29.9	29.4	27.7	28.7	25.5	19.9	299.2
Source: Meteoblue (modeled/calculated data, not measured locally)

== Demographics ==
Population census of Bubong
Year	Pop.	±% p.a.
1918	2,107	—
1939	5,538	+4.71%
1948	8,503	+4.88%
1960	7,567	−0.97%
1970	8,144	+0.74%
1975	8,594	+1.08%
1980	7,780	−1.97%
1990	11,504	+3.99%
1995	14,054	+3.82%
2000	19,003	+6.68%
2007	23,148	+2.76%
2010	19,455	−6.13%
2015	22,336	+2.66%
2020	26,514	+3.68%
2024	28,733	+1.95%
Source: Philippine Statistics Authority

== Economy ==
Poverty Incidence of Bubong

Source: Philippine Statistics Authority
