= Buadiposo-Buntong =

Municipality in Lanao del Sur, Philippines

Buadiposo-Buntong بواديبوسو-بنتونج
- Municipality
- Municipality of Buadiposo-Buntong
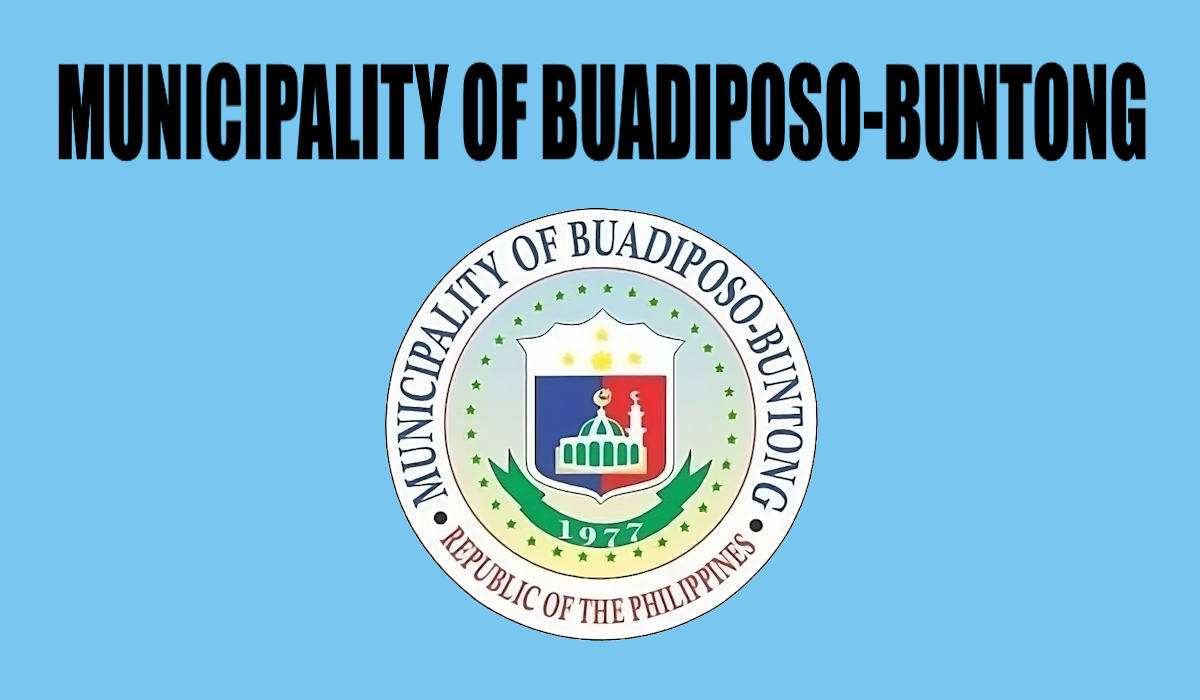
- Flag Seal

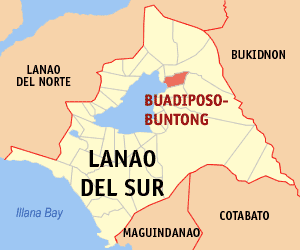
- Map of Lanao del Sur with Buadiposo-Buntong highlighted
- Interactive map of Buadiposo-Buntong
- Location within the Philippines
- Coordinates: 7°58′05″N 124°22′19″E
- Country: Philippines
- Region: Bangsamoro Autonomous Region in Muslim Mindanao
- Province: Lanao del Sur
- House district: 1st district
- Parliamentary district: 3rd district
- Barangays: 33 (see Barangays)

Government
  - Type: Sangguniang Bayan
  - Mayor: Noron G. Dadayan
  - Vice Mayor: Norhosnya M. Landua
  - House Representative: Ziaur-Rahman A. Adiong
  - Municipal Council: Members: Jalanie S. Domado; Norhainie M. Domato; Anisah T. Dadayan; Norlainie H. Macarampat; Lacs L. Panantaon Jr.; Kiram D. Riga; Al-Nor O. Matuan; Anisa D. Macaombao
  - Electorate: 13,728 voters (2025)

Area
  - Total: 215.00 km^{2} (83.01 sq mi)
- Elevation: 740 m (2,430 ft)
- Highest elevation: 1,028 m (3,373 ft)
- Lowest elevation: 696 m (2,283 ft)

Population (2024 census)
  - Total: 23,283
  - Density: 108.29/km^{2} (280.48/sq mi)
  - Households: 2,787

Economy
  - Income class: 3rd municipal income class
  - Poverty incidence: 19.52% (2023)
  - Revenue: ₱ 145 million (2024)
  - Assets: ₱ 204.9 million (2024)
  - Expenditure: ₱ 111.2 million (2024)
  - Liabilities: ₱ 76.58 million (2024)

Service provider
  - Electricity: Lanao del Sur Electric Cooperative (LASURECO)
- Time zone: UTC+8 (PST)
- ZIP code: 9714
- PSGC: 1903633000
- IDD : area code: +63 (0)63
- Native languages: Maranao; Tagalog
- Website: www.buadiposobuntong-lds.gov.ph

Buadiposo-Buntong, officially the Municipality of Buadiposo-Buntong (Maranao and Iranun: Inged a Buadiposo-Buntong; Tagalog: Bayan ng Buadiposo-Buntong), is a municipality in the province of Lanao del Sur, Philippines. According to the 2024 census, it has a population of 23,283 people.

== Geography ==
=== Barangays ===
Buadiposo-Buntong is politically subdivided into 33 barangays. Each barangay consists of puroks while some have sitios.

- Bacolod
- Bangon
- Buadiposo Lilod
- Buadiposo Proper
- Bubong
- Buntong Proper
- Cadayonan
- Dansalan
- Gata
- Kalakala
- Katogonan
- Lumbac
- Lumbatan Manacab
- Lumbatan Pataingud
- Manacab (Poblacion)
- Minanga (Buntong)
- Paling
- Pindolonan
- Pualas
- Buadiposo Raya
- Sapot
- Tangcal
- Tarik
- Tuka
- Bangon Proper
- Raya Buntong (Buntong East)
- Lunduban (Ragondingan)
- Ragondingan East
- Ragondingan Proper
- Ragondingan West
- Boto Ragondingan
- Datu Tambara
- Dirisan

=== Climate ===
Climate data for Buadiposo-Buntong, Lanao de Sur
Month	Jan	Feb	Mar	Apr	May	Jun	Jul	Aug	Sep	Oct	Nov	Dec	Year
Mean daily maximum °C (°F)	24 (75)	24 (75)	25 (77)	26 (79)	26 (79)	25 (77)	25 (77)	25 (77)	25 (77)	25 (77)	25 (77)	25 (77)	25 (77)
Mean daily minimum °C (°F)	20 (68)	20 (68)	20 (68)	20 (68)	21 (70)	21 (70)	20 (68)	20 (68)	20 (68)	20 (68)	20 (68)	20 (68)	20 (68)
Average precipitation mm (inches)	159 (6.3)	143 (5.6)	166 (6.5)	183 (7.2)	357 (14.1)	414 (16.3)	333 (13.1)	309 (12.2)	289 (11.4)	285 (11.2)	253 (10.0)	166 (6.5)	3,057 (120.4)
Average rainy days	18.4	17.2	20.6	23.4	29.3	29.2	29.9	29.4	27.7	28.7	25.5	19.9	299.2
Source: Meteoblue (modeled/calculated data, not measured locally)

== Demographics ==
Population census of Buadiposo-Buntong
Year	Pop.	±% p.a.
1980	6,805	—
1990	10,403	+4.34%
1995	11,657	+2.16%
2000	13,535	+3.25%
2007	19,316	+5.03%
2010	15,662	−7.35%
2015	16,130	+0.56%
2020	18,046	+2.39%
2024	23,283	+6.31%
Source: Philippine Statistics Authority

== Economy ==
Poverty Incidence of Buadiposo-Buntong

Source: Philippine Statistics Authority
