= Saguiaran =

Municipality in Lanao del Sur, Philippines

Saguiaran ساغياران
- Municipality
- Municipality of Saguiaran
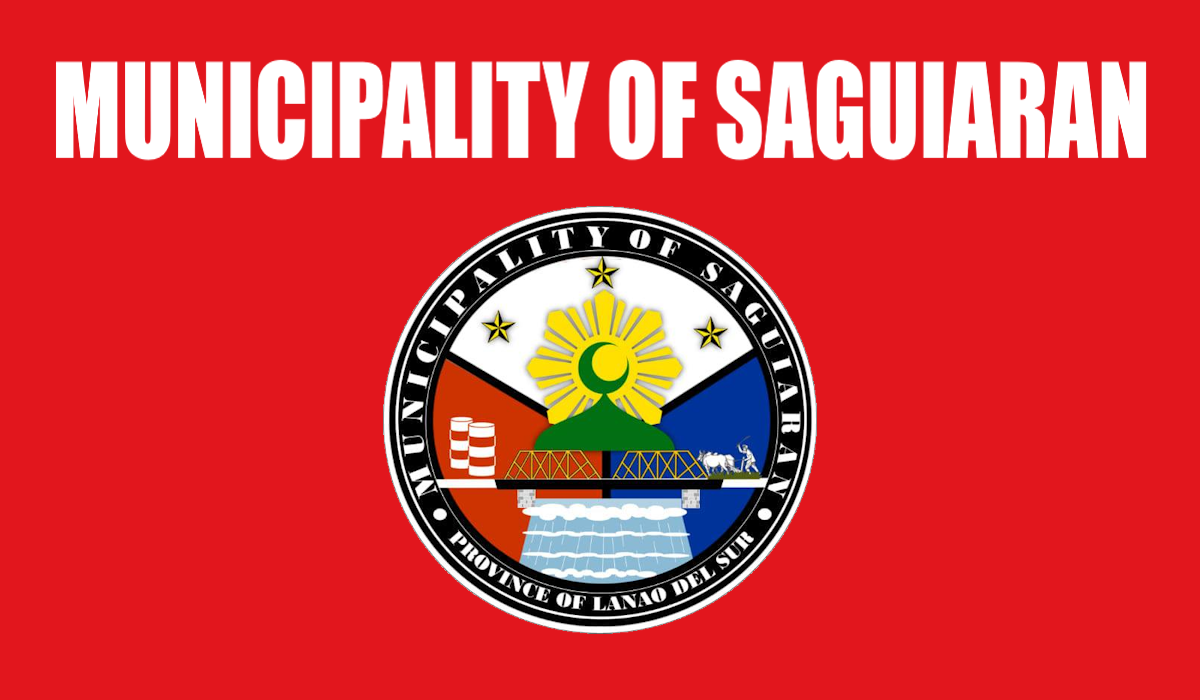
- Flag Seal

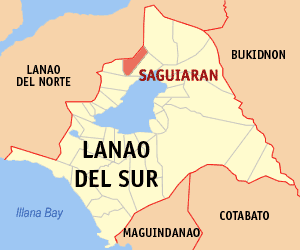
- Map of Lanao del Sur with Saguiaran highlighted
- Interactive map of Saguiaran
- Location within the Philippines
- Coordinates: 8°02′N 124°16′E
- Country: Philippines
- Region: Bangsamoro Autonomous Region in Muslim Mindanao
- Province: Lanao del Sur
- House district: 1st district
- Parliamentary district: 2nd district
- Barangays: 30 (see Barangays)

Government
  - Type: Sangguniang Bayan
  - Mayor: Jalalodin M. Angin
  - Vice Mayor: Hafiz A. Muti
  - House Representative: Ziaur-Rahman A. Adiong
  - Municipal Council: Members: Kimal S. Tanggo; Amrollah S. Macote; Milad M. Salacop; Jamali T. Adiong; Nur-Hassan M. Tanggo; Najib Macapodi B. H. Malic; Amer Rustom L. Tanggo; Edris M. Dimaro
  - Electorate: 23,451 voters (2025)

Area
  - Total: 51.35 km^{2} (19.83 sq mi)
- Elevation: 669 m (2,195 ft)
- Highest elevation: 1,046 m (3,432 ft)
- Lowest elevation: 365 m (1,198 ft)

Population (2024 census)
  - Total: 28,807
  - Density: 561.0/km^{2} (1,453/sq mi)
  - Households: 3,911

Economy
  - Income class: 3rd municipal income class
  - Poverty incidence: 29.74% (2023)
  - Revenue: ₱ 60.79 million (2024)
  - Assets: ₱ 253 million (2024)
  - Expenditure: ₱ 157.7 million (2024)
  - Liabilities: ₱ 158.7 million (2024)

Service provider
  - Electricity: Lanao del Sur Electric Cooperative (LASURECO)
- Time zone: UTC+8 (PST)
- ZIP code: 9701
- PSGC: 1903625000
- IDD : area code: +63 (0)63
- Native languages: Maranao; Tagalog
- Website: www.saguiaran-lds.gov.ph

Saguiaran, officially the Municipality of Saguiaran (Maranao: Inged a Saguiaran; Tagalog: Bayan ng Saguiaran), is a municipality in the province of Lanao del Sur, Philippines. According to the 2024 census, it has a population of 28,807 people.

It is home to NPC Agus II Hydro Power Plant.

== Geography ==
It is about 7 kilometers from Marawi City's KM 000. One can reach Saguiaran either via road transport from Iligan City via jeepney or public utility vehicle going to Marawi City.

=== Barangays ===
Saguiaran is politically subdivided into 30 barangays. Each barangay consists of puroks while some have sitios.

- Alinun
- Bagoingud
- Basak Maito
- Batangan
- Bubong
- Cadayon
- Cadingilan
- Comonal
- Dilausan
- Dilimbayan
- Gadongan
- Linao
- Limogao
- Lumbacatoros
- Lumbayanague
- Maliwanag
- Mapantao
- Mipaga
- Natangcopan
- Pagalamatan
- Pamacotan
- Panggao
- Pantao Raya
- Pantaon
- Patpangkat
- Pawak
- Pindolonan
- Poblacion
- Salocod
- Sunggod

=== Climate ===
Climate data for Saguiaran, Lanao de Sur
Month	Jan	Feb	Mar	Apr	May	Jun	Jul	Aug	Sep	Oct	Nov	Dec	Year
Mean daily maximum °C (°F)	25 (77)	25 (77)	26 (79)	27 (81)	26 (79)	26 (79)	26 (79)	26 (79)	26 (79)	26 (79)	25 (77)	25 (77)	26 (79)
Mean daily minimum °C (°F)	20 (68)	20 (68)	20 (68)	21 (70)	22 (72)	21 (70)	21 (70)	21 (70)	21 (70)	21 (70)	21 (70)	21 (70)	21 (70)
Average precipitation mm (inches)	159 (6.3)	143 (5.6)	166 (6.5)	183 (7.2)	357 (14.1)	414 (16.3)	333 (13.1)	309 (12.2)	289 (11.4)	285 (11.2)	253 (10.0)	166 (6.5)	3,057 (120.4)
Average rainy days	18.4	17.2	20.6	23.4	29.3	29.2	29.9	29.4	27.7	28.7	25.5	19.9	299.2
Source: Meteoblue (modeled/calculated data, not measured locally)

== Demographics ==
Population census of Saguiaran
Year	Pop.	±% p.a.
1960	13,227	—
1970	18,003	+3.13%
1975	18,151	+0.16%
1980	13,117	−6.29%
1990	15,296	+1.55%
1995	18,703	+3.84%
2000	22,636	+4.18%
2007	23,274	+0.38%
2010	22,673	−0.95%
2015	24,619	+1.58%
2020	26,712	+1.73%
2024	28,807	+1.83%
Source: Philippine Statistics Authority

Almost all people residing in Saguiaran are Maranao with only minority from other tribes usually Maguindanaon, Bisaya, and Subanon who are working as house-help and other available jobs. Some people of Saguiaran, particularly those from the Barangays along the national highway such as Barangay Batangan, Poblacion and Mipaga, trace their roots from the Royal Sultanate of Marawi or the Buadi Sacayo. The most notable clans are the Amaikurot of Maitu Basak, the Bracan and Dimacaling from Lima Ka Agama.

== Economy ==
Poverty Incidence of Saguiaran

Source: Philippine Statistics Authority

The main form of livelihood is agriculture. However, through the influx of businessmen from Marawi City, establishments such as gasoline stations, hardware and construction materials shops, tailoring shops, glassware shops, pharmacies, groceries, Maranaw and Middle Eastern restaurants and coffee shops are visible throughout the main thorough fare.

== Tourism ==
Pantuwaraya Lake National Park is a 20 hectares (49 acres) park comprising Lake Pantao Raya and surrounding area. It was declared a national park in 1965.

Tourists can visit the Basak Lake located at Barangay Maito Basak. Another tourists attraction is the Buwalan Mosque, considered the oldest Mosque in Saguiaran, is situated above tiny hills where in nearby spring provides potable water to people of Saguiaran and nearby Marawi City. This spring has many outlets but the notable one is the one being used by the public as water supply.

Tourists may buy special Browa, a Maranao delicacy, at Tata Bakeshoppe along the National Highway fronting the Municipal Hall. The taste has made this Browa special than other Browa made from Marawi City. The provincial welcome arch is located at Saguiaran, which is notable for its Islamic influence.

Bualan Mosque, is considered the oldest mosque in Saguiaran.

Pantar Bridge is a half-century-old American-built truss bridge. Overseen from the bridge is the water reservoir of National Power Corporation and the welcome arch of the province of Lanao del Sur.

== Education ==
There are a few of the public and private schools in Saguiaran: Secondary

- Mindanao State University - Saguiaran Community High school, is considered the best Mindanao State University External Units High School (2003-2017) and was one of the most reputable public high schools in Lanao del Sur.
- Saguiaran National High School
- M & S Maito Basak National High School
- Sampal Memorial National High School

Elementary

- Saguiaran Central Elementary School
- Bubong Elementary School
- Batangan Elementary School
- Philippine Integrated School – Saguiaran Branch
- Al-Malik Child Learning and Technology Training Center, Inc.
