= Marantao =

Municipality in Lanao del Sur, Philippines

Marantao مارانتاو
- Municipality
- Municipality of Marantao
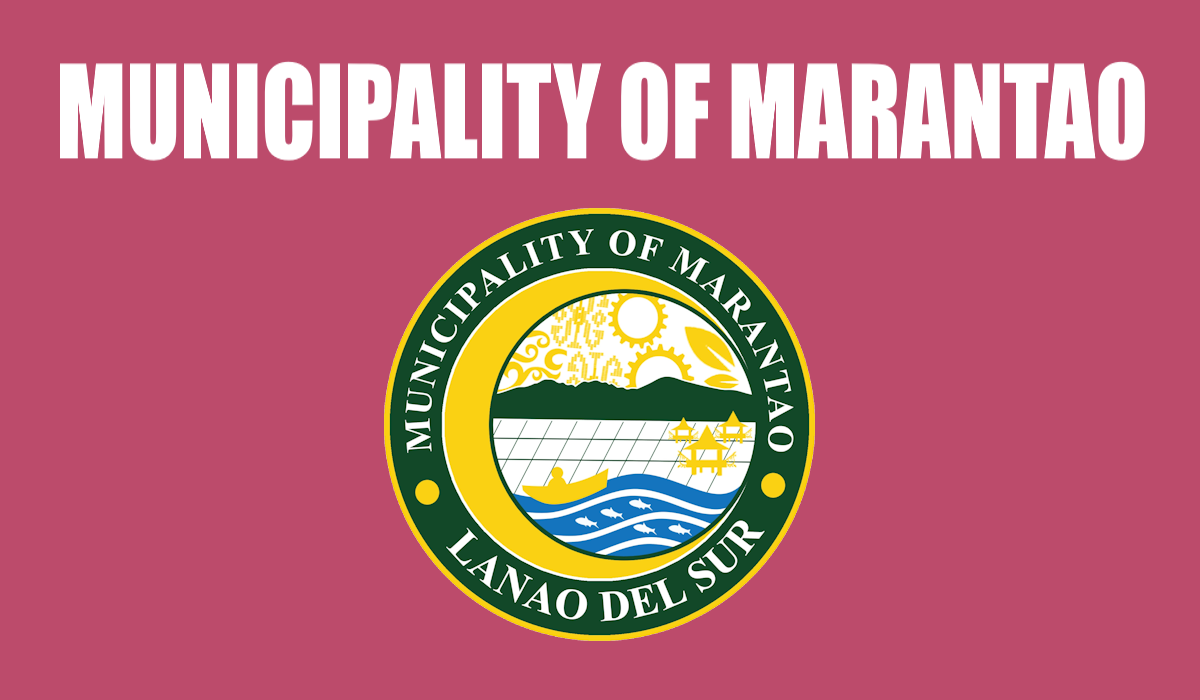
- Flag Seal

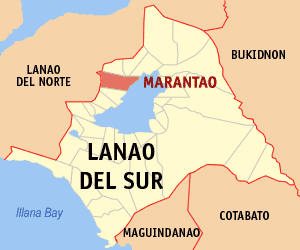
- Map of Lanao del Sur with Marantao highlighted
- Interactive map of Marantao
- Location within the Philippines
- Coordinates: 7°57′00″N 124°13′59″E
- Country: Philippines
- Region: Bangsamoro Autonomous Region in Muslim Mindanao
- Province: Lanao del Sur
- House district: 1st district
- Parliamentary district: 2nd district
- Barangays: 34 (see Barangays)

Government
  - Type: Sangguniang Bayan
  - Mayor: Akira I. Alonto
  - Vice Mayor: Nashriph B. Cornell
  - House Representative: Ziaur-Rahman A. Adiong
  - Municipal Council: Members: Alieskandar U. Alonto III; Bolkiah S. Umpar; Jamael L. Baraocor; Amron D. Cornell; Omar-Naseef P. Yusoph; Abdulbashet P. Abdullah; Nur Hanieffe B. Datumolok; Elias S. Disomala
  - Electorate: 36,147 voters (2025)

Area
  - Total: 660.00 km^{2} (254.83 sq mi)
- Elevation: 795 m (2,608 ft)
- Highest elevation: 1,171 m (3,842 ft)
- Lowest elevation: 696 m (2,283 ft)

Population (2024 census)
  - Total: 46,233
  - Density: 70.050/km^{2} (181.43/sq mi)
  - Households: 5,909

Economy
  - Income class: 1st municipal income class
  - Poverty incidence: 14.92% (2023)
  - Revenue: ₱ 274 million (2024)
  - Assets: ₱ 175 million (2024)
  - Expenditure: ₱ 229.1 million (2024)
  - Liabilities: ₱ 12.43 million (2024)

Service provider
  - Electricity: Lanao del Sur Electric Cooperative (LASURECO)
- Time zone: UTC+8 (PST)
- ZIP code: 9711
- PSGC: 1903616000
- IDD : area code: +63 (0)63
- Native languages: Maranao; Tagalog
- Website: www.marantao-lds.gov.ph

Marantao, officially the Municipality of Marantao (Maranao: Inged a Marantao; Tagalog: Bayan ng Marantao), is a municipality in the province of Lanao del Sur, Philippines. According to the 2024 census, it has a population of 46,233 people.

Marantao (Merantau) is a Malay word that means "to go on adventure, travel or hunting or even on a war expedition".

== Geography ==
=== Barangays ===
Marantao is politically subdivided into 34 barangays. Each barangay consists of puroks while some have sitios.

- Bacayawan
- Bacong
- Banga-Pantar
- Batal-Punud
- Bubong Madanding (Bubong)
- Camalig Bandara Ingud
- Camalig Bubong
- Camalig (Poblacion)
- Cawayan
- Cawayan Bacolod
- Cawayan Kalaw
- Cawayan Linuk
- Daanaingud
- Ilian
- Inudaran Campong
- Inudaran Loway
- Inudaran Lumbac
- Kialdan Proper
- Lubo Kialdan
- Lumbac Kialdan
- Mantapoli Kialdan
- Matampay Kialdan
- Maul
- Maul Ilian
- Maul Lumbaca Ingud
- Nataron
- Pagalongan Bacayawan
- Palao
- Pataimas Kialdan
- Poblacion
- Poona Marantao
- Punud Proper
- Tacub
- Tuca Kialdan

=== Climate ===
Climate data for Marantao, Lanao de Sur
Month	Jan	Feb	Mar	Apr	May	Jun	Jul	Aug	Sep	Oct	Nov	Dec	Year
Mean daily maximum °C (°F)	24 (75)	24 (75)	25 (77)	26 (79)	26 (79)	25 (77)	25 (77)	25 (77)	25 (77)	25 (77)	25 (77)	25 (77)	25 (77)
Mean daily minimum °C (°F)	20 (68)	20 (68)	20 (68)	20 (68)	21 (70)	21 (70)	20 (68)	20 (68)	20 (68)	20 (68)	20 (68)	20 (68)	20 (68)
Average precipitation mm (inches)	159 (6.3)	143 (5.6)	166 (6.5)	183 (7.2)	357 (14.1)	414 (16.3)	333 (13.1)	309 (12.2)	289 (11.4)	285 (11.2)	253 (10.0)	166 (6.5)	3,057 (120.4)
Average rainy days	18.4	17.2	20.6	23.4	29.3	29.2	29.9	29.4	27.7	28.7	25.5	19.9	299.2
Source: Meteoblue (modeled/calculated data, not measured locally)

== Demographics ==
Population census of Marantao
Year	Pop.	±% p.a.
1918	3,640	—
1939	6,783	+3.01%
1948	2,494	−10.52%
1960	13,720	+15.26%
1970	15,861	+1.46%
1975	16,496	+0.79%
1980	11,777	−6.52%
1990	18,404	+4.57%
1995	20,942	+2.45%
2000	24,647	+3.55%
2007	32,075	+3.70%
2010	28,550	−4.15%
2015	32,974	+2.78%
2020	37,763	+2.90%
2024	46,233	+4.98%
Source: Philippine Statistics Authority

== Economy ==
Poverty Incidence of Marantao

Source: Philippine Statistics Authority

== Culture ==
=== Kawayan Torogan ===
The Kawayan Torogan is the oldest known torogan in the Philippines. It is a traditional Maranao house built for royal Maranao families. There was once a campaign where the people wanted the municipalities of Marantao and Tugaya to pass an ordinance where the architectural scheme of the two towns will follow only the totogan style, in effect, preserve the Maranao people's most royal architectural style and lead to the first two towns with a planned town landscape under an indigenous Maranao architecture. However, the campaign led to deaf ears due to little funding available.
