= Kapai =

Municipality in Lanao del Sur, Philippines

Kapai كافاي
- Municipality
- Municipality of Kapai
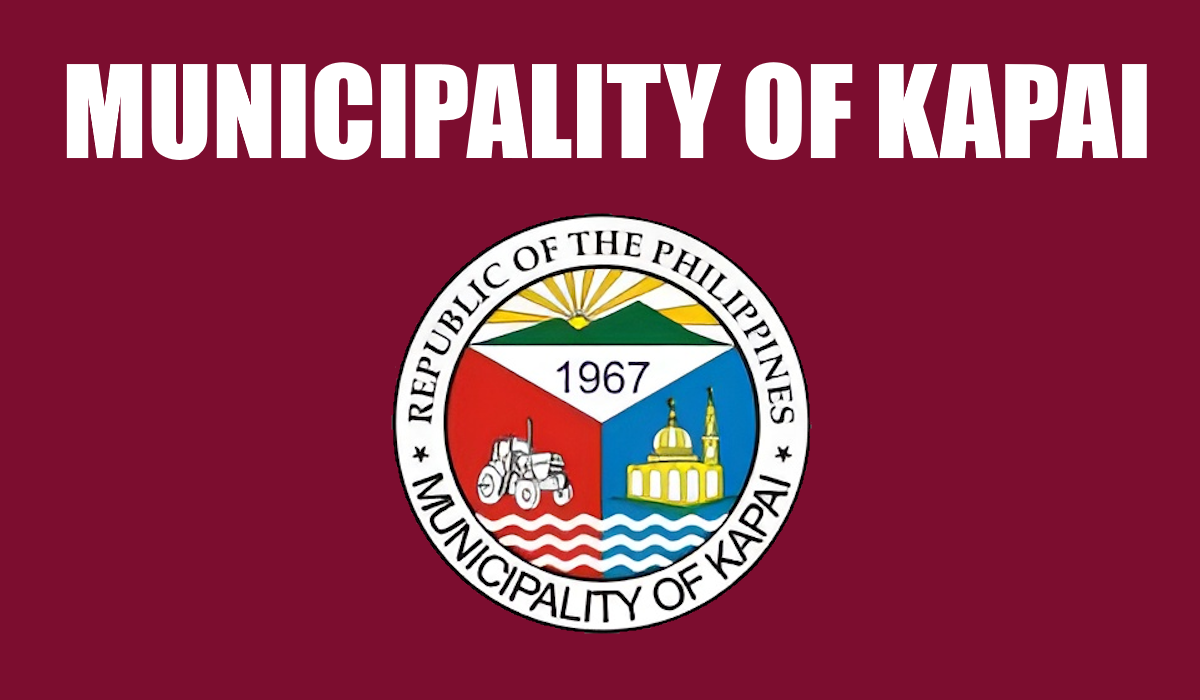
- Flag Seal

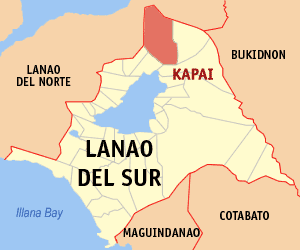
- Map of Lanao del Sur with Kapai highlighted
- Interactive map of Kapai
- Location within the Philippines
- Coordinates: 8°04′28″N 124°21′54″E
- Country: Philippines
- Region: Bangsamoro Autonomous Region in Muslim Mindanao
- Province: Lanao del Sur
- House district: 1st district
- Parliamentary district: 2nd district
- Barangays: 20 (see Barangays)

Government
  - Type: Sangguniang Bayan
  - Mayor: Aidah C. Gauraki
  - Vice Mayor: Hamza E. Gauraki
  - House Representative: Ziaur-Rahman A. Adiong
  - Municipal Council: Members: Shainollah P. Eppie; Mus-ab A. Gauraki; Johary H. H. Salal; Cader L. Amekir; Jamila E. Succor; Amiroden T. Abdulmalik; Camal M. Magondacan; Matabalao M. Magondacan
  - Electorate: 14,161 voters (2025)

Area
  - Total: 398.50 km^{2} (153.86 sq mi)
- Elevation: 713 m (2,339 ft)
- Highest elevation: 1,132 m (3,714 ft)
- Lowest elevation: 561 m (1,841 ft)

Population (2024 census)
  - Total: 21,630
  - Density: 54.28/km^{2} (140.6/sq mi)
  - Households: 2,960

Economy
  - Income class: 2nd municipal income class
  - Poverty incidence: 30.28% (2023)
  - Revenue: ₱ 285.6 million (2024)
  - Assets: ₱ 612.3 million (2024)
  - Expenditure: ₱ 210.3 million (2024)
  - Liabilities: ₱ 157.5 million (2024)

Service provider
  - Electricity: Lanao del Sur Electric Cooperative (LASURECO)
- Time zone: UTC+8 (PST)
- ZIP code: 9709
- PSGC: 1903610000
- IDD : area code: +63 (0)63
- Native languages: Maranao; Tagalog
- Website: www.kapai-lds.gov.ph

Kapai, officially the Municipality of Kapai (Maranao: Inged a Kapai; Tagalog: Bayan ng Kapai), is a municipality in the province of Lanao del Sur, Philippines. According to the 2024 census, it has a population of 21,630 people.

== Geography ==
=== Barangays ===
Kapai is politically subdivided into 20 barangays. Each barangay consists of puroks while some have sitios.

- Babayog
- Cormatan
- Dilabayan
- Dilimbayan
- Dimagaling (Dimagalin Proper)
- Dimunda
- Doronan
- Gadongan
- Kasayanan Proper
- Kasayanan West
- Kibolos
- Kining
- Lidasan
- Macadar
- Malna Proper
- Pagalongan
- Pantaon
- Parao
- Pindolonan
- Poblacion (Kapai Proper)

=== Climate ===
Climate data for Kapai, Lanao de Sur
Month	Jan	Feb	Mar	Apr	May	Jun	Jul	Aug	Sep	Oct	Nov	Dec	Year
Mean daily maximum °C (°F)	25 (77)	25 (77)	26 (79)	27 (81)	26 (79)	26 (79)	26 (79)	26 (79)	26 (79)	26 (79)	26 (79)	25 (77)	26 (79)
Mean daily minimum °C (°F)	21 (70)	20 (68)	21 (70)	21 (70)	22 (72)	22 (72)	21 (70)	21 (70)	21 (70)	21 (70)	21 (70)	21 (70)	21 (70)
Average precipitation mm (inches)	159 (6.3)	143 (5.6)	166 (6.5)	183 (7.2)	357 (14.1)	414 (16.3)	333 (13.1)	309 (12.2)	289 (11.4)	285 (11.2)	253 (10.0)	166 (6.5)	3,057 (120.4)
Average rainy days	18.4	17.2	20.6	23.4	29.3	29.2	29.9	29.4	27.7	28.7	25.5	19.9	299.2
Source: Meteoblue (modeled/calculated data, not measured locally)

== Demographics ==
Population census of Kapai
Year	Pop.	±% p.a.
1918	596	—
1939	891	+1.93%
1948	1,476	+5.77%
1960	5,029	+10.75%
1970	5,169	+0.27%
1975	9,243	+12.36%
1980	5,544	−9.71%
1990	11,221	+7.31%
1995	13,310	+3.25%
2000	16,564	+4.80%
2007	18,916	+1.85%
2010	17,370	−3.06%
2015	18,894	+1.61%
2020	20,581	+1.82%
2024	21,630	+1.20%
Source: Philippine Statistics Authority

== Economy ==
Poverty Incidence of Kapai

Source: Philippine Statistics Authority
