= Lumba-Bayabao =

Municipality in Lanao del Sur, Philippines

Lumba-Bayabao لومبا باياباو
- Municipality
- Municipality of Lumba-Bayabao
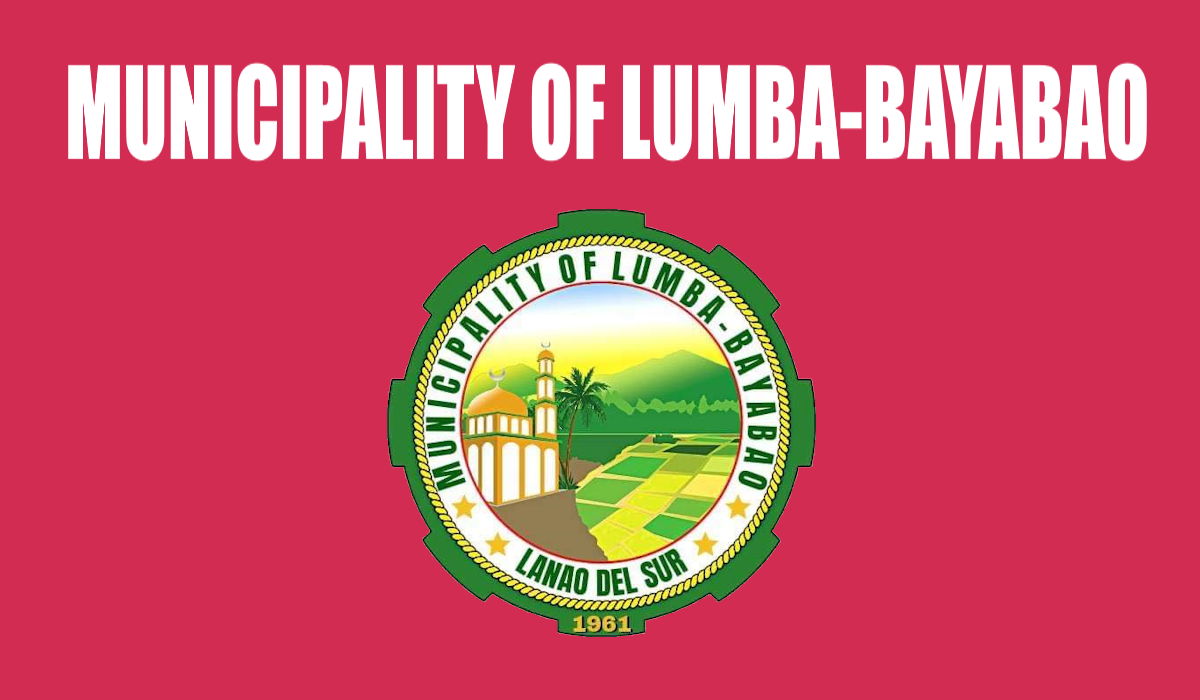
- Flag Seal

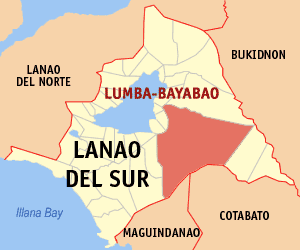
- Map of Lanao del Sur with Lumba-Bayabao highlighted
- Interactive map of Lumba-Bayabao
- Location within the Philippines
- Coordinates: 7°51′55″N 124°22′11″E
- Country: Philippines
- Region: Bangsamoro Autonomous Region in Muslim Mindanao
- Province: Lanao del Sur
- House district: 1st district
- Parliamentary district: 9th district
- Barangays: 38 (see Barangays)

Government
  - Type: Sangguniang Bayan
  - Mayor: Mahar P. Dagalangit
  - Vice Mayor: Lalawein B. Macud
  - House Representative: Ansaruddin Abdul Malik A. Adiong
  - Municipal Council: Members: Mudjahed R. Macala; Hadji Omar D. Bato; Angcaya P. Dagalangit; Anwar M. Gago-Lamping; Ma-acota L. Benaning; Jalanie D. Macabumbun; Russell G. Bansao; Russel L. Dagalangit
  - Electorate: 19,733 voters (2025)

Area
  - Total: 640.02 km^{2} (247.11 sq mi)
- Elevation: 756 m (2,480 ft)
- Highest elevation: 1,158 m (3,799 ft)
- Lowest elevation: 696 m (2,283 ft)

Population (2024 census)
  - Total: 50,959
  - Density: 79.621/km^{2} (206.22/sq mi)
  - Households: 7,378

Economy
  - Income class: 1st municipal income class
  - Poverty incidence: 19.22% (2023)
  - Revenue: ₱ 315.2 million (2024)
  - Assets: ₱ 377.7 million (2024)
  - Expenditure: ₱ 278.3 million (2024)
  - Liabilities: ₱ 129.8 million (2024)

Service provider
  - Electricity: Lanao del Sur Electric Cooperative (LASURECO)
- Time zone: UTC+8 (PST)
- ZIP code: 9703
- PSGC: 1903611000
- IDD : area code: +63 (0)63
- Native languages: Maranao; Tagalog
- Website: www.lumbabayabao-lds.gov.ph

Lumba-Bayabao, officially the Municipality of Lumba-Bayabao (Maranao: Inged a Lumba-Bayabao; Tagalog: Bayan ng Lumba-Bayabao), is a municipality in the province of Lanao del Sur, Philippines. According to the 2024 census, it has a population of 50,959 people.

== Geography ==
=== Barangays ===
Lumba-bayabao is politically subdivided into 39 barangays. Each barangay consists of puroks while some have sitios.

- Bacolod I
- Bacolod II
- Bantayao
- Barit
- Baugan
- Buad Lumbac
- Cabasaran
- Calilangan
- Carandangan-Mipaga
- Cormatan Langban
- Dialongana
- Dilindongan-Cadayonan
- Gadongan
- Galawan
- Gambai
- Kasula
- Lalangitun
- Lama
- Lindongan Dialongana
- Lobo Basara
- Lumbac Bacayawan
- Macaguiling
- Maliwanag
- Mapantao
- Mapoling
- Pagayawan
- Maribo (Poblacion)
- Posudaragat
- Rumayas (Minitepad)
- Sabala Bantayao
- Salaman
- Salolodun Berwar
- Sarigidan Madiar
- Sunggod
- Taluan
- Tamlang
- Tongcopan
- Turogan
- Minaring Diladigan

=== Climate ===
Climate data for Bacolod-Kalawi, Lanao de Sur
Month	Jan	Feb	Mar	Apr	May	Jun	Jul	Aug	Sep	Oct	Nov	Dec	Year
Mean daily maximum °C (°F)	24 (75)	24 (75)	25 (77)	26 (79)	26 (79)	25 (77)	25 (77)	25 (77)	25 (77)	25 (77)	25 (77)	25 (77)	25 (77)
Mean daily minimum °C (°F)	20 (68)	20 (68)	20 (68)	20 (68)	21 (70)	21 (70)	20 (68)	20 (68)	20 (68)	20 (68)	20 (68)	20 (68)	20 (68)
Average precipitation mm (inches)	159 (6.3)	143 (5.6)	166 (6.5)	183 (7.2)	357 (14.1)	414 (16.3)	333 (13.1)	309 (12.2)	289 (11.4)	285 (11.2)	253 (10.0)	166 (6.5)	3,057 (120.4)
Average rainy days	18.4	17.2	20.6	23.4	29.3	29.2	29.9	29.4	27.7	28.7	25.5	19.9	299.2
Source: Meteoblue (modeled/calculated data, not measured locally)

== Demographics ==
Population census of Lumba-Bayabao
Year	Pop.	±% p.a.
1918	4,227	—
1939	16,528	+6.71%
1948	18,463	+1.24%
1960	23,753	+2.12%
1970	18,052	−2.70%
1975	26,289	+7.83%
1980	17,031	−8.31%
1990	19,099	+1.15%
1995	21,003	+1.80%
2000	23,521	+2.46%
2007	57,304	+13.07%
2010	32,412	−18.73%
2015	36,151	+2.10%
2020	45,909	+5.16%
2024	50,959	+2.54%
Source: Philippine Statistics Authority

== Economy ==
Poverty Incidence of Lumba-Bayabao

Source: Philippine Statistics Authority
