= Maguing =

Municipality in Lanao del Sur, Philippines

Maguing ماغينج
- Municipality
- Municipality of Maguing
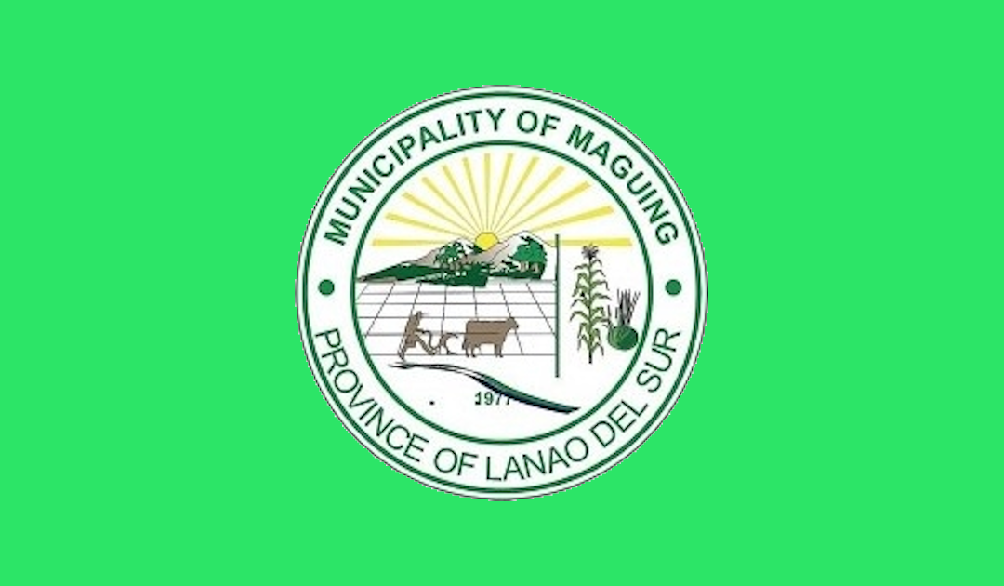
- Flag Seal

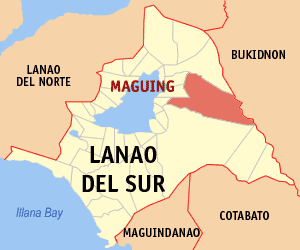
- Map of Lanao del Sur with Maguing highlighted
- Interactive map of Maguing
- Location within the Philippines
- Coordinates: 7°53′21″N 124°22′17″E
- Country: Philippines
- Region: Bangsamoro Autonomous Region in Muslim Mindanao
- Province: Lanao del Sur
- House district: 1st district
- Parliamentary district: 3rd district
- Barangays: 34 (see Barangays)

Government
  - Type: Sangguniang Bayan
  - Mayor: Fahad D. Molok
  - Vice Mayor: Aslani M. Haron
  - House Representative: Ziaur-Rahman A. Adiong
  - Municipal Council: Members: Emran P. Abdul Rashad; Rakman M. Ampuan; Norhan H. Ampuan; Hadji Hidaya G. Ambaco; Namolakan G. Abdul; Nabil C. Ampuan; Salic M. H. Samad; Sadam B. Macabato
  - Electorate: 22,285 voters (2025)

Area
  - Total: 815.04 km^{2} (314.69 sq mi)
- Elevation: 770 m (2,530 ft)
- Highest elevation: 1,127 m (3,698 ft)
- Lowest elevation: 696 m (2,283 ft)

Population (2024 census)
  - Total: 37,292
  - Density: 45.755/km^{2} (118.50/sq mi)
  - Households: 4,704

Economy
  - Income class: 1st municipal income class
  - Poverty incidence: 17.29% (2023)
  - Revenue: ₱ 273.8 million (2024)
  - Assets: ₱ 215.1 million (2024)
  - Expenditure: ₱ 268.6 million (2024)
  - Liabilities: ₱ 1.261 million (2024)

Service provider
  - Electricity: Lanao del Sur Electric Cooperative (LASURECO)
- Time zone: UTC+8 (PST)
- ZIP code: 9715
- PSGC: 1903634000
- IDD : area code: +63 (0)63
- Native languages: Maranao; Tagalog
- Website: www.maguing-lds.gov.ph

Maguing, officially the Municipality of Maguing (Maranao: Inged a Maguing; Tagalog: Bayan ng Maguing), is a municipality in the province of Lanao del Sur, Philippines. According to the 2024 census, it has a population of 37,292 people.

== History ==
In 2005, Barangays Lumbac-Dimarao and Pindolonan were created.

In 2024, a bill was filed in the Bangsamoro Parliament seeking the separation of 14 barangays of the municipality to create the new municipality of Raya Maguing.

The Municipality of Maguing has been popularly known of its origin as the municipality comprising Lumba-Bayabao, Woo, and Bumbaran wayback in 1918. It was renamed Lumba-Bayaboo under Republic Act No.1420 on June 10, 1956, and became a regular Municipality in 1961 by virtue of Executive Order no.420 dated june 1, 1961.

== Geography ==
The Municipality of Maguing was derived from erstwhile Municipality of Lumba-Bayabao on May 4, 1977 by virtue of Presidential Decree No. 1134.It is located in the eastern part of the Province of Lanao del Sur. Bounded on the East by sister Municipalities of Wao, Bumbaran and Bukidnon, on the South by Lumba-Bayabao and on the North by the Municipality of Mulondo and Bubong and on West by the Municipality of Taraka. It is approximately 27.0 Kilometers or 60 minutes to travel from its nearest trade center which is Marawi City. It is accessible by land transportation from the City of Marawi passing through the municipalities of Bubong. Ditsaan Ramain, Buadi Puso Buntong and Mulondo.

=== Barangays ===
Maguing is politically subdivided into 34 barangays. Each barangay consists of puroks while some have sitios.

- Agagan
- Balagunun
- Balawag
- Balintao
- Bato-bato
- Bolao
- Borocot
- Borrowa
- Botud
- Buadiangkay
- Bubong
- Bubong Bayabao
- Camalig
- Cambong
- Dilausan (Poblacion)
- Dilimbayan
- Ilalag
- Kianodan
- Lilod Borocot
- Lilod Maguing
- Lumbac
- Lumbac-Dimarao
- Madanding
- Madaya
- Maguing Proper
- Malungun
- Malungun Borocot
- Malungun Pagalongan
- Pagalongan
- Panayangan
- Pilimoknan
- Pindolonan
- Ragayan (Rungayan)
- Sabala Dilausan

=== Climate ===
Climate data for Maguing, Lanao de Sur
Month	Jan	Feb	Mar	Apr	May	Jun	Jul	Aug	Sep	Oct	Nov	Dec	Year
Mean daily maximum °C (°F)	24 (75)	24 (75)	25 (77)	26 (79)	26 (79)	25 (77)	25 (77)	25 (77)	25 (77)	25 (77)	25 (77)	25 (77)	25 (77)
Mean daily minimum °C (°F)	20 (68)	20 (68)	20 (68)	20 (68)	21 (70)	21 (70)	20 (68)	20 (68)	20 (68)	20 (68)	20 (68)	20 (68)	20 (68)
Average precipitation mm (inches)	159 (6.3)	143 (5.6)	166 (6.5)	183 (7.2)	357 (14.1)	414 (16.3)	333 (13.1)	309 (12.2)	289 (11.4)	285 (11.2)	253 (10.0)	166 (6.5)	3,057 (120.4)
Average rainy days	18.4	17.2	20.6	23.4	29.3	29.2	29.9	29.4	27.7	28.7	25.5	19.9	299.2
Source: Meteoblue (modeled/calculated data, not measured locally)

== Demographics ==
Population census of Maguing
Year	Pop.	±% p.a.
1980	6,784	—
1990	15,362	+8.52%
1995	15,539	+0.21%
2000	18,095	+3.32%
2007	29,045	+6.74%
2010	21,444	−10.45%
2015	24,531	+2.59%
2020	30,436	+4.64%
2024	37,292	+5.00%
Source: Philippine Statistics Authority

== Economy ==
Maguing is one of the biggest Municipalities in Lanao del Sur, having a total land area of 81,500 hectares and a 2nd Class Municipality, Farming is the predominant source of livelihood in the Municipality. The municipality has undeveloped springs, waterfalls and the great Putiyan River which is docketed in the history of watershed as Taraka River. Said River is very feasible and viable source of water supply.

As to the income and livelihood, data shows that 55.44% households now have income less than the poverty threshold of P11,793.00. This means that these households do not have an adequate income to meet their basic needs like food and clothing due to very low agricultural production. This core problem is cause by lack of communal irigation System to supply water during dry season. Commercial activities in the area are limited only to small-scale basis. There are sari-sari stores within the Poblacion and barangays of the municipality. Merchants transient in nature coming from Marawi City and other neighboring municipalities. Due to lack of job opportunities, low farm yield/production and lack of modern farm technology, the populace alternative way of livelihood is looking for greener pasture in the metro.

Maguing belongs to the Fourth (4) type of Climate which characterized by more or less even distribution of rainfall throughout the year based on the MSU-Agro-Met. The most number of rainy days are the months of August and September then June and July the least number of rainy days. The heaviest rain was during the month of June and July with 422mm and 386.4mm respectively. The highest temperature is during the month of July. It has also a bodies of water of which Putiyan River exist otherwise known as Taraka River (one of the biggest river in the Province of Lanao del Sur) and has also Creeks and small Rivers.

The Municipality has only one (1) type of soil, the Ruguan Clay Loam which is characterized by slight drought, low fertility, and salinity. This is good for diversified crops such as rice, com, Sorghum, Legumes. Root crops, and free crops.

Data from the Bureau of Soils revealed that the Municipality has a good land, nearly and can be cultivated safely but due to low fertility, drought and slight alkalinity, it needs to practice good farming technique and management In order to maintain its fertility.

Two fifth of the municipal land area is considered as forest zone. One-fifth for residential building and the rest two fifth is agricultural land. Maguing is known for having a wide vast and plain ogricultural area, therefore, the dominant Evelihood in the locality is farming. However, the municipality is dependent on rain full due to non-availability of Irrigation System, the reason farmers harvest is low.

The local administration of Fahad Molok had taken some measures to help farmers. Some of these projects are acquisition of farm (pre and post-harvest) machineries like rice tracers and hand tractors to suffice the needs of the farmers. Trainings or Seminars on modem agricultural techniques was not taught to the farmers hence old method or techniques of farming is still a practice in the municipality. Purchase and distribution of rice seedlings and fertilizers was once done by the municipality in collaboration with Department of Agriculture but was unsuccessful since pests and plant diseases destroyed the rice plants.

The municipality has significant natural resources, including four undeveloped springs, waterfalls, and Puliyan Lake. The Taraka River, recorded in the Department of Environment and Natural Resources (DENR) as such, traverses the municipality and extends to the Municipality of Taraka. The river has potential as a source of water supply, subject to proper assessment and development.

As to income and livelihood, data shows that 55.44% households have income less than the poverty threshold of P11,793.00. This means that these households do not have an adequate income to meet their basic needs like food and clothing.. This core problem is cause by unemployment of 26.48% of productive age of 16–50 years old and the low agricultural production.

Commercial activities in the area are not limited to small-scale basis like sari-sari stores. There are also groceries, car washes, water refilling stations and two construction firms in the municipality. Agricultural plantation in the upper portion of the municipality like abaca, orange fruits and vegetable plantations. and two constructions firms within the Poblacion and barangays of the municipality. Merchants transient in nature coming from Marawi City and other neighboring municipalities.

=== Poverty incidence ===
Poverty incidence of Maguing (%)

Source: Philippine Statistics Authority
