= Tagoloan, Lanao del Sur =

Municipality in Lanao del Sur, Philippines

Tagoloan تاغولوان
- Municipality
- Municipality of Tagoloan
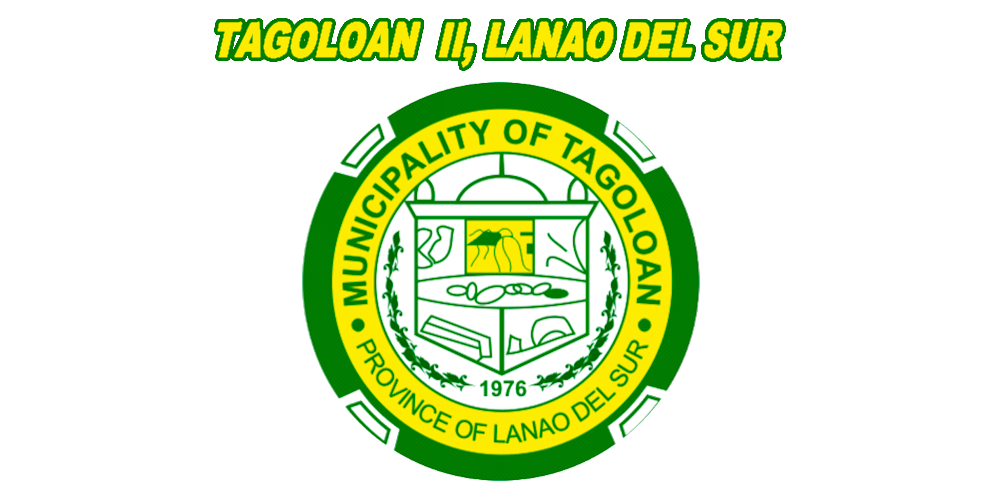
- Flag Seal

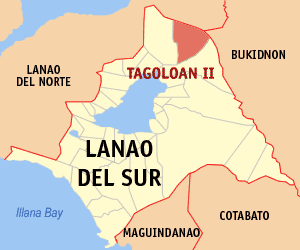
- Map of Lanao del Sur with Tagoloan highlighted
- Interactive map of Tagoloan
- Location within the Philippines
- Coordinates: 8°04′48″N 124°24′35″E
- Country: Philippines
- Region: Bangsamoro Autonomous Region in Muslim Mindanao
- Province: Lanao del Sur
- House district: 1st district
- Parliamentary district: 3rd district
- Barangays: 19 (see Barangays)

Government
  - Type: Sangguniang Bayan
  - Mayor: Misangcad M. Capal
  - Vice Mayor: Mangondaya L. Capal
  - House Representative: Ziaur-Rahman A. Adiong
  - Municipal Council: Members: Norodin C. Gandawali; Alimon C. Busran; Fahad M. Capal; Almerah A. Capal; Abdani A. Sacar; Normala L. Capal; Sittie Saleha C. Sarip; Basmala A. Manso
  - Electorate: 20,194 voters (2025)

Area
  - Total: 362.35 km^{2} (139.90 sq mi)
- Elevation: 800 m (2,600 ft)
- Highest elevation: 1,304 m (4,278 ft)
- Lowest elevation: 560 m (1,840 ft)

Population (2024 census)
  - Total: 12,843
  - Density: 35.444/km^{2} (91.799/sq mi)
  - Households: 1,650

Economy
  - Income class: 3rd municipal income class
  - Poverty incidence: 29.67% (2023)
  - Revenue: ₱ 168.4 million (2024)
  - Assets: ₱ 115.1 million (2024)
  - Expenditure: ₱ 157.5 million (2024)
  - Liabilities: ₱ 0.02232 million (2024)

Service provider
  - Electricity: Lanao del Sur Electric Cooperative (LASURECO)
- Time zone: UTC+8 (PST)
- ZIP code: 9321
- PSGC: 1903638000
- IDD : area code: +63 (0)63
- Native languages: Maranao; Tagalog
- Website: www.tagoloan-lds.gov.ph

Tagoloan, officially the Municipality of Tagoloan (Maranao: Inged a Tagoloan; Tagalog: Bayan ng Tagoloan) and also known as Tagoloan II, is a municipality in the province of Lanao del Sur, Philippines. According to the 2024 census, it has a population of 12,843 people.

== Etymology ==
Tagoloan is a compound word composed of Maranao terms tago, referring to something inside i.e. inhabitants, and oloan, "leader", referring to Sultan Sharif Alawi.

The municipality's name is not to be confused with eponymous municipalities of Lanao del Norte and Misamis Oriental, both called Tagoloan.

== History ==
Sharif Alawi established the Sultanate of Tagoloan in 1500. Some local historians say it was in the year 1515 while his younger brother Sultan Sharif Kabunsuan was enthroned as the First Sultan of Maguindanao in the year 1520 (see Confederation of sultanates in Lanao).

Sharif Alawi and Sharif Kabunsuan came from Johore, a state in Malaysia and first landed in Mindanao in the year 1475 at an islet (now Agutayan reef, in Jasaan, Misamis Oriental, visible from the seaport of the Municipality of Tagoloan in the Province of Misamis Oriental, Northern Mindanao. The brothers arrived in Mindanao in the year 1464

Sultan Sharif Alawi spread Islam (prior to the arrival of Christianity in Philippine in 1521), in this town towards Surigao, Butuan, Bukidnon, Davao, Lanao del Sur and Norte, stretching towards Misamis Occidental in western Mindanao. Sultan Sharif Kabunsuan only preached Islam in Maguindanao.

== Geography ==
It is situated in the northern part of the Province of Lanao del Sur, containing a total land area of 60,214 hectares, more or less. This area is based on the territorial jurisdiction covered by those barangays (39 Barangays) named in the Presidential Decree 1548 dated June 11, 1978, otherwise known as the "charter creation of the Municipality of Tagoloan in the Province of Lanao del Sur" which hereby described as follows;

Bounded on the east by the Cagayan River (Talakag, Bukidnon); on the south by Bubong, Lanao del Sur; on the south-west by Kapai, Lanao del Sur, and Tagoloan, Lanao del Norte; on the west by Iligan; on the north by Cagayan de Oro.

=== Barangays ===
Tagoloan is politically subdivided into 19 barangays. Each barangay consists of puroks while some have sitios.

It was originally subdivided into 39 barangays under the P.D. 1548 dated June 11, 1978 and was then reduced into 19 barangays, as affected by E.O. No. 108, Series of 1986.

- Bago-ah Ingud
- Bantalan
- Bayog
- Cadayonan
- Dagonalan
- Domalama
- Gayakay
- Inudaran
- Kalilangan
- Kianibong
- Kinggan
- Kita-o-an
- Malinao
- Malingun
- Mama-an Pagalongan
- Marawi
- Mimbaguiang
- Sigayan
- Tagoloan Poblacion

=== Climate ===
Climate data for Tagoloan, Lanao de Sur
Month	Jan	Feb	Mar	Apr	May	Jun	Jul	Aug	Sep	Oct	Nov	Dec	Year
Mean daily maximum °C (°F)	22 (72)	23 (73)	24 (75)	24 (75)	24 (75)	23 (73)	23 (73)	24 (75)	24 (75)	24 (75)	23 (73)	23 (73)	23 (74)
Mean daily minimum °C (°F)	18 (64)	18 (64)	18 (64)	19 (66)	20 (68)	19 (66)	19 (66)	19 (66)	19 (66)	19 (66)	19 (66)	18 (64)	19 (66)
Average precipitation mm (inches)	159 (6.3)	143 (5.6)	166 (6.5)	183 (7.2)	357 (14.1)	414 (16.3)	333 (13.1)	309 (12.2)	289 (11.4)	285 (11.2)	253 (10.0)	166 (6.5)	3,057 (120.4)
Average rainy days	18.4	17.2	20.6	23.4	29.3	29.2	29.9	29.4	27.7	28.7	25.5	19.9	299.2
Source: Meteoblue (modeled/calculated data, not measured locally)

== Demographics ==
Population census of Tagoloan
Year	Pop.	±% p.a.
1970	1,853	—
1975	2,305	+4.47%
1980	4,876	+16.16%
1990	7,414	+4.28%
1995	7,760	+0.86%
2000	8,714	+2.52%
2007	11,144	+3.45%
2010	9,843	−4.42%
2015	11,169	+2.44%
2020	12,602	+2.57%
2024	12,843	+0.46%
Source: Philippine Statistics Authority

== Economy ==
Poverty Incidence of Tagoloan

Source: Philippine Statistics Authority
