= List of political parties campaigning for self-government =

This is a list of political parties campaigning for self-government. Listed here are parties with a specific ethnic minority background or regional parties active on a national level promoting more autonomy or independence for their region. Only parliamentary (including regional parliaments or councils) or former parliamentary parties are listed. Some of these parties are members or observers of the European Free Alliance (EFA).

== France ==
=== Alsace ===
- Unser Land
- Alsace d'abord

=== Basque Country ===
- Basque Solidarity
- Basque Nationalist Party
- Abertzaleen Batasuna

=== Brittany ===
- Breton Democratic Union
- Breton Party
- Emgann

=== Corsica ===
- Party of the Corsican Nation
- Corsican Nation

=== Martinique ===
- Martinican Independence Movement
- Martinican Progressive Party
- Build the Martinique Country

=== Northern Catalonia ===
- Catalan Unity

=== Occitania ===
- Occitan Party

=== Savoy ===
- Savoy Region Movement
- Savoyan League

== Germany ==
=== Bavaria ===
- Bavaria Party

=== Lower Saxony ===
- The Friesens

== India ==
- Bharat Rashtra Samithi (successful)
- Jharkhand Mukti Morcha (successful)
- Gorkha Janmukti Morcha

== Iraq ==
- Kurdistan Democratic Party of Iraq
- Patriotic Union of Kurdistan

== Italy ==
=== Alto Adige/South Tyrol ===
- South Tyrolean People's Party
- Die Freiheitlichen
- South Tyrolean Freedom
- Greens of South Tyrol
- Citizens' Union for South Tyrol
- Ladins Dolomites
- Lega Alto Adige Südtirol
- We South Tyroleans

=== Aosta Valley ===
- Valdostan Union
- Edelweiss
- Autonomist Federation
- Progressive Valdostan Union
- Autonomy Liberty Participation Ecology
- Lega Vallée d'Aoste

=== Apulia ===
- Apulia First of All
- Southern Action League
- Moderates and Populars

=== Emilia-Romagna ===
- Lega Emilia
- Lega Romagna

=== Friuli-Venezia Giulia ===
- Lega Friuli-Venezia Giulia
- Slovene Union
- Friuli Movement
- Julian Front

=== Liguria ===
- Lega Liguria
- Ligurian Independentist Movement

=== Lombardy ===
- Lega Lombarda
- Lega per l'Autonomia – Alleanza Lombarda

=== Marche ===
- Lega Marche

=== Northern and central Italy ===
- Lega Nord / Lega

=== Piedmont ===
- Lega Piemonte
- Lega Padana

=== Sardinia ===
- Sardigna Natzione Indipendentzia
- Sardinian Reformers
- Fortza Paris
- Union of Sardinians
- Sardinian Action Party
- Independence Republic of Sardinia
- Sardinia Tomorrow
- Red Moors

=== Sicily ===
- Party of the Sicilians
- Movement for the Independence of Sicily
- Reformist Democrats for Sicily
- The Other South

=== Southern Italy ===
- Great South
- Movement for the Autonomies
- Reality Italy–Autonomy South
- Southern Action League
- Lega Sud Ausonia

=== Trentino ===
- Union for Trentino
- Lega Trentino
- Trentino Tyrolean Autonomist Party
- Administer Trentino
- Ladin Autonomist Union
- Trentino Civic List

=== Tuscany ===
- Lega Toscana
- More Tuscany

=== Umbria ===
- Lega Umbria

=== Veneto ===
- Liga Veneta
- North East Union
- North East Project
- Liga Veneta Repubblica
- Venetians Movement
- Venetian Independence
- Liga Veneto Autonomo
- Toward North
- Veneto State

== New Zealand ==
- New Munster Party
- NZ South Island Party
- South Island Party (2008)

== Pakistan ==
- Balochistan National Party (Awami)
- Balochistan National Party (Mengal)
- Awami National Party
- Pukhtunkhwa Milli Awami Party

== Saint Kitts and Nevis ==
=== Nevis ===
- Concerned Citizens Movement

== Serbia ==
- League of Social Democrats of Vojvodina

== Spain ==
=== Castile ===
- Castilian Left (Izquierda Castellana)
- Castilian Party (Partido Castellano)

=== Andalusia ===
- Andalucista Party

=== Aragon ===
- Aragonese Party (Partido Aragonés)
- Aragonese Union (Chunta Aragonesista)

=== Asturias ===
- Asturian Left (Izquierda Asturiana)
- Andecha Astur

=== Balearic Islands ===
- Socialist Party of Majorca
- Proposal for the Isles (Proposta per les Illes)

=== Basque Country ===
- Basque Nationalist Party (Partido Nacionalista Vasco)
- Basque Solidarity (Eusko Alkartasuna)
- Aralar
- Communist Party of the Basque Homelands
- EH Bildu

=== Canary Islands ===
- Canarian Coalition
- New Canaries

=== Catalonia ===
- Convergence and Unity (Convergència i Unió), coalition of:
  - Democratic Convergence of Catalonia (Convergència Democràtica de Catalunya)
  - Democratic Union of Catalonia (Unió Democràtica de Catalunya)
- Republican Left of Catalonia (Esquerra Republicana de Catalunya)
- Initiative for Catalonia Greens (Iniciativa per Catalunya Verds), formerly in coalition with Izquierda Unida

=== Galicia ===
- Galician Nationalist Bloc (Bloque Nacionalista Galego)

=== León ===
- Leonese People's Union (Unión del Pueblo Leonés)

=== Navarra ===
- Navarrese People's Union (Unión del Pueblo Navarro)
- Nafarroa Bai

=== Valencia ===
- Compromise Coalition (Coalició Compromís)

== Sri Lanka ==
- All Ceylon Tamil Congress
- Democratic Tamil National Alliance
- Ilankai Tamil Arasu Kachchi
- Tamil National Alliance
- Tamil United Liberation Front

== Sweden ==
=== Scania ===
- Scania Party

== Turkey ==
- Peace and Democracy Party
- Peoples' Democratic Party (Turkey)

== United Kingdom ==
=== North of England ===
- Northern Independence Party

=== Yorkshire ===
- Yorkshire Party
- Yorkshire Liberal Democrats

=== Cornwall ===
- Mebyon Kernow – the Party for Cornwall

=== Wessex ===
- Wessex Regionalist Party

=== England ===
- English Democrats

=== Scotland ===
- Scottish National Party
- Scottish Greens
- Alba Party

=== Wales ===
- Plaid Cymru – the Party of Wales
- Propel
- Gwlad

=== Northern Ireland ===
All parties in the Northern Ireland Assembly support continued devolution for Northern Ireland. Irish nationalist/republican parties support a united Ireland.

== United States ==
=== Alaska ===
- Alaskan Independence Party

=== California ===
- California National Party

=== Puerto Rico ===
- Puerto Rican Independence Party

== See also ==
- Lists of political parties
- Political parties of minorities
- List of active autonomist and secessionist movements
