= List of active separatist movements in South America =

This is a list of currently active separatist movements in South America. Separatism includes autonomism and secessionism.

== Criteria ==
What is and is not considered an autonomist or secessionist movement is sometimes contentious. Entries on this list must meet three criteria:

1. They are active movements with active members.
2. They are seeking greater autonomy or self-determination for a geographic region (as opposed to personal autonomy).
3. They are citizens/people of the conflict area and do not come from another country.

Under each region listed is one or more of the following:

- De facto state (de facto entity): for unrecognized regions with de facto autonomy. (Excluding Uncontacted peoples)
- Proposed state: proposed name for a seceding sovereign state.
- Proposed autonomous area: for movements towards greater autonomy for an area but not outright secession.
  - De facto autonomous government: for governments with de facto autonomous control over a region.
  - Government-in-exile: for a government based outside of the region in question, with or without control.
  - Political party (or parties): for political parties involved in a political system to push for autonomy or secession.
  - Militant organisation(s): for armed organisations.
  - Advocacy group(s): for non-belligerent, non-politically participatory entities.
  - Ethnic/ethno-religious/racial/regional/religious group(s).

== Argentina ==
Mendoza

- Proposed state: Mendoza
  - Advocacy group: Éxito

Wallmapu

- Proposed state: Wallmapu
  - Advocacy groups: Consejo de Todas las Tierras, Resistencia Ancestral Mapuche, Coordinadora Arauco-Malleco

Patagonia

- Proposed state: Patagonia
  - Advocacy group: Movimiento Independentista Patagónico

Río Negro Province

- Proposed autonomous area: Rio Negro Province
  - Political Party: Together We Are Río Negro
  - Ethnic group: Tehuelche people and Mapuche

Formosa

- Ethnic group: Toba people, Wichí
  - Proposed: Autonomy for Formosa

Santa María Department

- Ethnic group: Diaguita
  - Proposed: autonomy for the Diaguita in the Santa María Department

Jujuy and Salta

- Ethnic group: Qulla
  - Proposed: autonomy for the Qulla

Corrientes

- Proposed: autonomy for Corrientes
  - Advocacy group: Partido Autonomista de Corrientes

Buenos Aires Province

- Proposed: self determination for Buenos Aires Province

Center Region

- Proposed: independence for the Center Region

== Bolivia ==
Santa Cruz Department

Santa Cruz

- Proposed state: Santa Cruz
  - Advocacy group: Nación Camba

Qullasuyu

- Proposed state: Qullasuyu
  - Proposed state or autonomous area: Qullasuyu
  - Advocacy groups for increased autonomy: Ethnocacerism, Coordinator of Indigenous Organizations of the Amazon Basin, National Confederation of Peruvian Amazonian Nationalities, Tupac Katari Guerrilla Army, Pachakuti Indigenous Movement and Indian Movement Túpac Katari, National Alliance of Workers, Farmers, Students, Reservists and Laborers (ANTAURO), Union for Peru, Go on Country, Peruvian Nationalist Party, Federation of Neighborhood Councils-El Alto
  - Ethnic group: Aymara people

Lomerío nation

- Ethnic group: Monkoxɨ people
  - Proposed: autonomy for the Monkoxɨ people
  - Advocacy group: Central Indígena de Comunidades Originarias de Lomerío

== Brazil ==
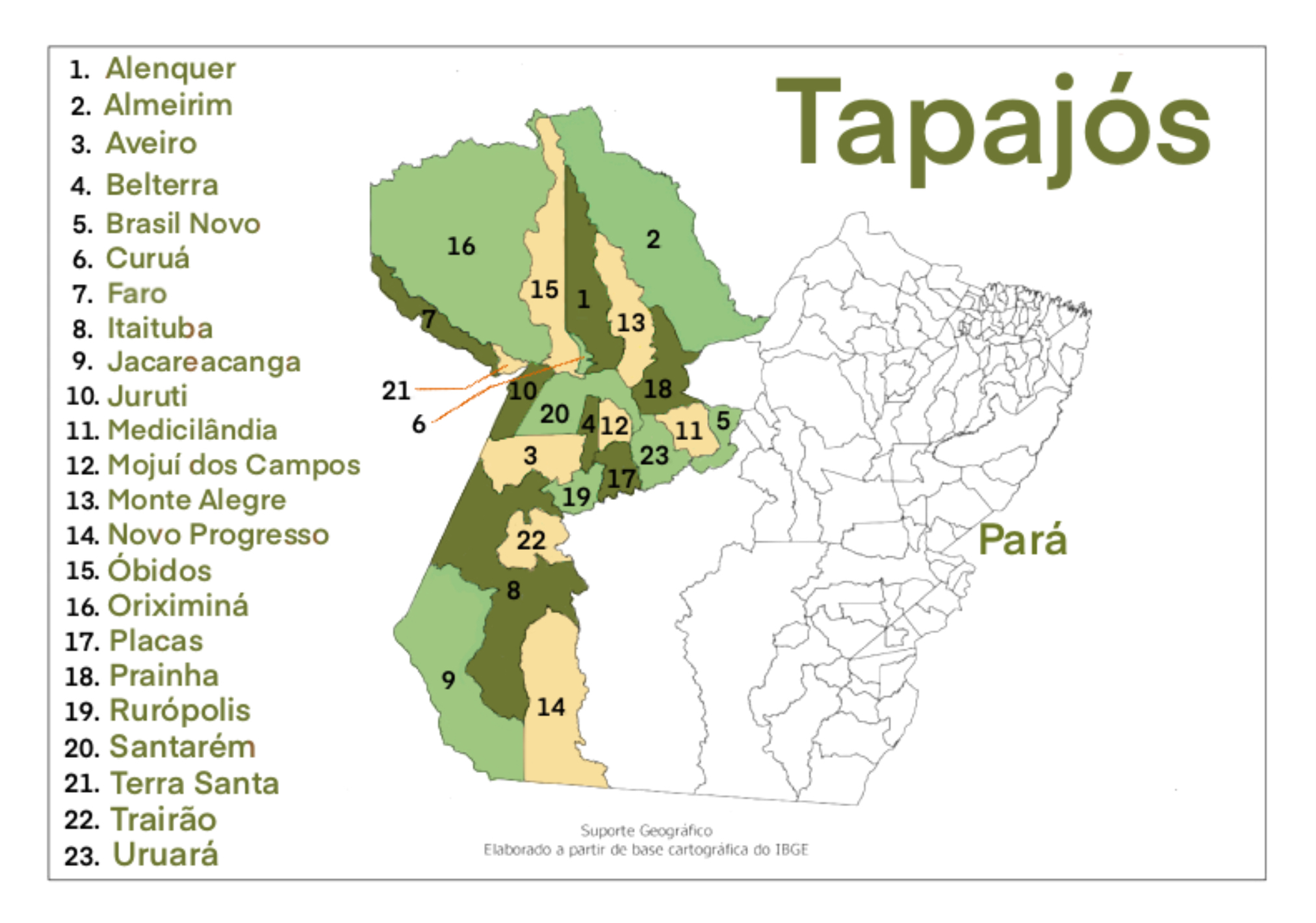
Map of the municipalities that would be part of the State of Tapajós, as proposed by PDL 508/2019.

=== Secessionist movements ===
South Region (Paraná, Rio Grande do Sul and Santa Catarina)

- Proposed: independence for the South Region
  - Advocacy group: The South Is My Country

São Paulo

- Proposed state: Republic of São Paulo
  - Advocacy group: Movimento São Paulo Independente

North Region

- Proposed: independence for the North Region
  - Advocacy group: Associação Cultural dos Povos da Amazônia

Northeast Region

- Proposed: independence for the Northeast Region
  - Advocacy group: Nordeste Independente

Bahia

- Proposed: independence for Bahia
  - Advocacy group: Movimento República da Bahia

Espírito Santo

- Proposed: independence for Espírito Santo
  - Advocacy group: O Espírito Santo é meu país

Rio de Janeiro

- Proposed: independence for Rio de Janeiro
  - Advocacy group: O Rio é meu país

Brasília

- Proposed: independence for Brasília
  - Advocacy group: Movimento Brasìlia Independente

Ceará

- Proposed: Independence for Ceará
  - Advocacy group: Movimento Ceará Meu País

Roraima

- Proposed: independence for Roraima
  - Advocacy group: Movimento Roraima independente

Goiás

- Proposed: independence for Goiás
  - Advocacy group: Movimento República de Goiás

=== Autonomist movements ===
Western Pará

- Proposed federative unit: State of Tapajós
  - Advocacy groups: Instituto Cidadão Pró-Estado do Tapajós (supported by the municipality of Santarém), Union of Municipalities for the State of Tapajós

== Chile ==
Wallmapu

- Proposed state or autonomous area: Wallmapu
  - Advocacy groups: Consejo de Todas las Tierras, Resistencia Ancestral Mapuche, Coordinadora Arauco-Malleco

Patagonia

- Proposed state: Patagonia
  - Pressure groups: Movimiento Independentista Patagónico

Chiloé

- Proposed autonomous area: Chiloé
  - Advocacy group: Movimiento Archipiélago Soberano

Arica y Parinacota

- Proposed autonomous area: Arica y Parinacota Region
  - Political party: Arica Estado Independiente

Magallanes

- Proposed autonomous area: Magallanes
  - Advocacy group: Partido Regionalista de Magallanes

Aysén Region

- Proposed: greater autonomy for the Aysén Region
  - Advocacy group: Aysén Regional Productive Development Committee

== Colombia ==
Antioquia

- Proposed state: Antioquia
  - Advocacy group: Por una Antioquia Libre y Soberana

Choco

- Proposed state: Choco
  - Advocacy group: República del Chocó

Caribe

- Proposed state: República del Caribe

=== Autonomist ===
Amazon natural region

- Ethnic group: Indigenous peoples in Colombia
  - Proposed: autonomy for the Indigenous peoples in Colombia

Magdalena Medio Antioquia

- Proposed: turning Magdalena Medio into its own department

== Ecuador ==
Guayaquil

- Proposed state: Guayaquil
  - Advocacy group: República de Guayaquil

Manabi

- Proposed state: Manabi

Loja

- Proposed: autonomy for the Saraguro people

Napo Province, Orellana Province and Pastaza Province

- Ethnic group: Waorani people
  - Proposed: autonomy for the Waorani people in Ecuador
  - Advocacy group: Confederation of Indigenous Nationalities of the Ecuadorian Amazon

Morona-Santiago Province

- Ethnic group: Shuar
  - Proposed: autonomy for the Shuar in Ecuador

== France ==
French Guiana

- Proposed state: Republic of Amazonia or Cayenne
  - Advocacy group: Decolonization and Social Emancipation Movement

== Guyana ==
Indigenous peoples in Guyana

- Proposed: autonomy for the Indigenous peoples in Guyana
  - Political party: Amerindian People’s Association
  - Ethnic group: Indigenous peoples in Guyana

== Peru ==
Qullasuyu

- Proposed state: Qullasuyu
  - Advocacy groups: Ethnocacerism, Coordinator of Indigenous Organizations of the Amazon Basin, National Confederation of Peruvian Amazonian Nationalities,Tupac Katari Guerrilla Army, Pachakuti Indigenous Movement, Indian Movement Túpac Katari, National Alliance of Workers, Farmers, Students, Reservists and Laborers (ANTAURO), Union for Peru, Go on Country, Peruvian Nationalist Party, Peruvian 'Great South'
  - Ethnic group: Aymara people

South Peru

- Proposed state: South Peru
  - Advocacy Group: Front for the Defense of the Northern Cone of Arequipa (FREDICON)

Department of Loreto

- Proposed autonomous area: Loreto
  - Ethnic group: Wampis

Department of Ucayali

- Ethnic group: Shipibo-Conibo
  - Proposed: autonomy for the Shipibo-Conibo
  - Advocacy group: Shipibo Konibo Xetebo Council

Department of Junín, Department of Pasco and Department of Huánuco

- Ethnic group: Asháninka
  - Proposed: autonomy for the Asháninka

== Venezuela ==
Zulia

- Proposed state or autonomous region: Zulia
  - Advocacy group: Autonomous Indigenous Movement of Zulia (Movimiento Indígena Autónomo del Zulia)

Nueva Esparta

- Proposed state: Nueva Esparta
  - Advocacy group: Haz que Nueva Esparta sea libre

Amazonas

- Ethnic group: Indigenous peoples in Venezuela
  - Proposed: autonomy for the Indigenous peoples in the Amazonas

== See also ==
- Lists of active separatist movements
- List of historical separatist movements
