= Geeske Krol-Benedictus =

Frisian politician (1931–2025)

Geeske Krol-Benedictus (18 June 1931 – 25 December 2025) was a Dutch Frisians politician and advocate for the West Frisian language, Frisian culture, and rural communities. A member of the leadership of the Frisian National Party (FNP), which advocates for the Frisian minority in the Netherlands, she served in the Provincial Council of Friesland from 1978 until 1995. Krol-Benedictus is considered one of the first prominent women leaders of the Frisian National Party, as well as an important figure within the Frisian Movement (De Fryske Beweging).

== Biography ==
Krol-Benedictus was born in Achtkarspelen, Friesland, to a Frisian speaking family. She received her degree in agricultural economics from Wageningen University and Research. She then studied at the University of Iowa in the United States for two years. Krol returned to the Netherlands, where she took a position as a policy officer at the Stichting Fryske Kultuerried (Frisian Cultural Council) in Leeuwarden, a now defunct foundation for the promotion of Frisian culture.

She then married Gerrit Krol, a geologist with whom she had two sons, Durk (born in Brazil) and Doutsen. The couple moved to Brazil and South Africa, where she worked as a research assistant at the University of Pretoria, before returning to the Netherlands in the early 1970s. They settled in a farmhouse in Boornbergum.

In the 1974 Dutch municipal elections, Krol-Benedictus was elected to the Smallingerland municipal counsil, becoming the first elected official from the Frisian National Party (FNP) in he history of Smallingerland. She served on Smallingerland's council for nine years.

In 1978, Krol-Benedictus was elected to the Provincial Council of Friesland a member of the FNP, alongside FNP leader Jan Bearn Singelsma, the leader of the FNP on the council since 1966. Once Singelsma stepped down as leader in 1980, Krol-Benedictus became the new leader of the FNP in the Friesland Provincial Council. She remained in office until her retirement in 1995. During her time in office, Krol-Benedictus campaigned for the equality and usage of the Frisian language alongside Dutch, spatial planning, and the preservation of village and rural life in Friesland. Under Krol-Benedictus, the FNP advocated for the establishment of regional Frisian language television stations in the province. She was also a member of the Dutch advisory committee for the 1992 European Charter for Regional or Minority Language.

After leaving office, she became chairwoman of the Feriening Lytse Doarpen, where she worked to protect and preserve small Frisian villages and rural communities and led it until 2002. In 2006, Feriening Lytse Doarpen merged with a second organization to establish Doarpswurk to support community development, village associations and cultural organizations in Friesland. In 2001, she participated in a discussion with Willem-Alexander of the Netherlands and Máxima Zorreguieta on potential solutions to population decline in rural villages in Friesland.

In 1997, Krol-Benedictus and Jaap Rinzema became the first foreigners to be awarded the medal of honor from the Kashubian-Pomeranian Association for their work on behalf of the Kashubians ethnic minority in northern Poland. Krol-Benedictus received the award during the commemoration ceremony for the 1000th anniversary of the city of Gdańsk.

A resident of Boornbergum, she remained active in politics and Frisian cultural advocacy into her 90s.

Krol-Benedictus died in Drachten on 25 December 2025 at the age of 94. Her husband, Gerrit Krol, died in 2015.
