= Transylvania–Banat League =

Political movement in Romania

The Transylvania–Banat League (Romanian: Liga Transilvania-Banat) was a political movement in Romania founded in March 2002 by Sabin Gherman. Author of the Manifesto "Im Fed up with Romania" The movement was established with the goal of advocating for the separation of Transylvania from Romania, which was met with controversy and opposition from other political parties. Sabin Gherman was rapporteur for Romania in the European Parliament from the Free European Alliance between 2000 and 2007, which later became the Transylvanian Party. Despite the controversy surrounding its establishment and goals, the Transylvania–Banat League gained a significant following, with an estimated 28,000 members in March 2004. The movement was active in advocating for regional autonomy and cultural preservation, and participated in political campaigns and elections. In addition to its political activities, the Transylvania–Banat League also focused on cultural and social initiatives, including organizing events and festivals to promote the cultural heritage of the Transylvania and Banat regions.

== See also ==
- European_Free_Alliance #Former members
- List of regional and minority parties in Europe
- List of active separatist movements in Europe
