= Frisian National Party =

Regionalist political party in Friesland, Netherlands

Frisian National Party Fryske Nasjonale Partij
- Abbreviation: FNP
- Chairperson: Jan Arendz
- Founders: Pyt Kramer; Folkert Binnema
- Founded: 16 December 1961; 64 years ago
- Headquarters: Obrechtstraat 32, Leeuwarden
- Youth wing: FNP Jongerein
- Ideology: Regionalism; Frisian-speaking minority interests; Frisian nationalism
- Political position: Centre-left
- National affiliation: Independent Politics Netherlands
- European affiliation: European Free Alliance
- Colours: Navy blue Red
- Senate: 1 / 75
- House of Representatives: 0 / 150
- European Parliament: 0 / 31
- Provincial Council of Friesland: 4 / 43
- Wetterskip Fryslân: 2 / 25
- Municipal councils in Friesland: 49 / 408

Website
- fnp.frl

The Frisian National Party (West Frisian: Fryske Nasjonale Partij, FNP; Dutch: Friese Nationale Partij) is a regionalist political party in the Netherlands. Founded in 1961, it is primarily involved in regional and local politics in the province of Friesland. The party advocates for the strengthening of the West Frisian language and culture, and seeks to increase self-government for the country's Frisian minority. The FNP is a full member of the European Free Alliance (EFA), and is represented in the Senate by Independent Politics Netherlands (OPNL).

== History ==
The party was founded on 16 December 1961 by Pyt Kramer and his nephew Folkert Binnema. The foundation of the party had been inspired by Indonesian president Sukarno, who criticised the Netherlands for supporting self-determination for the Papuan people, while denying the same right to the Frisians. This made Kramer and Binnema realise that a Frisian party was needed to represent the interests of Friesland.

The FNP won its first seat in the provincial legislature and municipal councils in 1966. In 1981, it became a founding member of the European Free Alliance. Since 1995, the party has participated in elections to the Senate as part of the Independent Senate Group (OSF). Three FNP members have led the OSF: Hendrik ten Hoeve (2003–2011), Gerben Gerbrandy (2019–2021), and Auke van der Goot (2023–present).

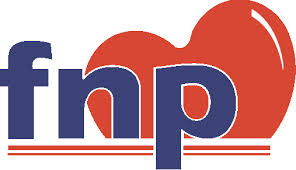
Former logo of the FNP

The party has been a part of the Frisian provincial executive since 2011. As of 2025, it has 49 members in 11 of the 18 Frisian municipal councils. It co-operates in the municipal executives of Tytsjerksteradiel, Waadhoeke, and Noardeast-Fryslân. In Wûnseradiel and Achtkarspelen, the party supplied the mayor. Since 2020, the FNP supplies the mayor of Noardeast-Fryslân.

The party announced participated in the 2025 general election, with Aant Jelle Soepboer as its lead candidate, but it did not secure any seats in the House of Representatives.

== Ideology ==
The FNP is a regionalist party which advocates a federal political system with more autonomy for Friesland. It also calls for protection and recognition of the Frisian language, conservation of the Frisian landscape, and Frisian control over its gas reserves.

Political position of FNP members
_{28} / _{77} / _{156} / _{97} / _{83} / _{41} / _{14} / _{58}; 1 Left / 2 ‹ · · / 3 · · · / 4 · · · / 5 · · · / 6 · · › / 7 Right / ?	Total: 554

Result of a membership survey conducted in 2009

In a survey conducted in 2009, FNP members were asked to place themselves on a 7-point left–right spectrum. Of 554 respondents, 60.65% identified as either centrist, centre-left or centre-right (scores 3 to 5). A plurality of respondents (156, or 28.16%) placed themselves just left of the centre (score 3).

== Election results ==
The party's electorate is limited to Friesland, where it dominates in the western and north-eastern part of the mainland of the province. In rural Littenseradiel, the FNP got nearly 28% of the votes and became the largest party in 2003. In 2010, 33.9% of the people voted FNP in rural Skarsterlân.

=== Provincial Council of Friesland ===
Election	Lead candidate	Votes	Share	Seats won	+/–	Government
1966	Jan Bearn Singelsma	6,647	2.40%	1 / 55	New	Opposition
1970	Jan Bearn Singelsma	11,014	4.54%	2 / 55	▲1	Opposition
1974	Jan Bearn Singelsma	21,738	7.44%	4 / 55	▲2	Opposition
1978	Jan Bearn Singelsma	15,878	4.76%	2 / 55	▼2	Opposition
1982	Geeske Krol-Benedictus	17,333	5.40%	3 / 55	▲1	Opposition
1987	Geeske Krol-Benedictus	15,115	4.49%	2 / 55	▼1	Opposition
1991	Geeske Krol-Benedictus	17,321	6.09%	3 / 55	▲1	Opposition
1995	Jan van der Baan	17,046	6.37%	3 / 55	0	Opposition
1999	[?]	21,333	8.39%	4 / 55	▲1	Opposition
2003	Johannes Kramer	36,871	13.22%	7 / 55	▲3	Opposition
2007	Johannes Kramer	28,225	10.68%	5 / 43	▼2	Opposition
2011	Annigje Toering	25,116	8.45%	4 / 43	▼1	Coalition
2015	Johannes Kramer	25,027	9.46%	4 / 43	0	Coalition
2019	Johannes Kramer	23,662	7.93%	4 / 43	0	Coalition
2023	Sijbe Knol	27,251	8.04%	4 / 43	0	Coalition

=== House of Representatives ===
Election	Lead candidate	Votes	Share	Seats won	+/–	Government
2025	Aant Jelle Soepboer	9,331	0.09%	0 / 150	New	Extraparliamentary

== See also ==
- South Schleswig Voters' Association
- The Frisians
