= 2025 Dutch general election =

- 29 October 2025
- All 150 seats in the House of Representatives; 76 seats needed for a majority
- Turnout: 78.30% (▲0.55pp)
Party	Leader	Vote %	Seats	+/–
D66	Rob Jetten	16.94	26	+17
PVV	Geert Wilders	16.66	26	−11
VVD	Dilan Yeşilgöz	14.24	22	−2
GL/PvdA	Frans Timmermans	12.79	20	−5
CDA	Henri Bontenbal	11.79	18	+13
JA21	Joost Eerdmans	5.95	9	+8
FVD	Lidewij de Vos	4.54	7	+4
BBB	Caroline van der Plas	2.65	4	−3
Denk	Stephan van Baarle	2.37	3	0
SGP	Chris Stoffer	2.25	3	0
PvdD	Esther Ouwehand	2.08	3	0
CU	Mirjam Bikker	1.90	3	0
SP	Jimmy Dijk	1.89	3	−2
50Plus	Jan Struijs	1.43	2	+2
Volt	Laurens Dassen	1.10	1	−1
This lists parties that won seats. See the complete results below.

Cabinet before	Cabinet after
Schoof cabinet PVV–VVD–NSC–BBB (Note: PVV and NSC left the coalition before the election.)	Jetten cabinet D66–VVD–CDA

Early general elections were held in the Netherlands on 29 October 2025 to elect the members of the House of Representatives. The elections had been expected to be held in 2028, but a snap election was called after the Schoof cabinet collapsed due to the Party for Freedom (PVV) withdrawing from the coalition. The margin of votes between the first- and second-placed parties, Democrats 66 (D66) and PVV, was the smallest since 1956.

And for the first time since the size of Parliament was last enlarged in 1956, those two leading parties, the social liberal D66 and the right-wing populist PVV, tied in seat counts, each winning 26 seats in the House. D66 achieved its best-ever result in a general election. The parties that were part of the Schoof cabinet—the PVV, the People's Party for Freedom and Democracy (VVD), New Social Contract (NSC), and the Farmer–Citizen Movement (BBB)—all lost seats, with NSC receiving a mere fraction of its last vote count and losing all 20 of its seats. The Christian Democratic Appeal (CDA) and JA21 made significant gains, with the CDA gaining 13 seats and JA21 gaining 8.

== Background ==
The 2023 Dutch general election resulted in losses for all parties in the fourth Rutte cabinet. The Party for Freedom (PVV) became the largest party in the House of Representatives for the first time and then formed a coalition with the People's Party for Freedom and Democracy (VVD), New Social Contract (NSC) and the Farmer–Citizen Movement (BBB). The Schoof cabinet with the independent Dick Schoof as prime minister was sworn in on 2 July 2024. On 3 June 2025, PVV left the coalition due to disagreements over asylum policy; this led to Schoof submitting the resignation of the cabinet.

A snap election was called for 29 October 2025; prior to this, the next general election had been scheduled for 15 March 2028. On 23 August 2025, NSC also left the coalition, citing disagreements over sanctions against Israel for the Gaza war. On 12 June 2025, the Labour Party and GroenLinks agreed to participate with one shared candidate list again and to merge their parties in 2026.

Three current parliamentary parties had a change in their lead candidate since the 2023 election. Jimmy Dijk replaced Lilian Marijnissen as Socialist Party (SP) leader less than a month after the election, while Thierry Baudet stepped down for Lidewij de Vos to be the lead candidate of Forum for Democracy (FvD), and Eddy van Hijum was chosen as lead candidate of NSC after Pieter Omtzigt and Nicolien van Vroonhoven both stepped down.

== Electoral system ==
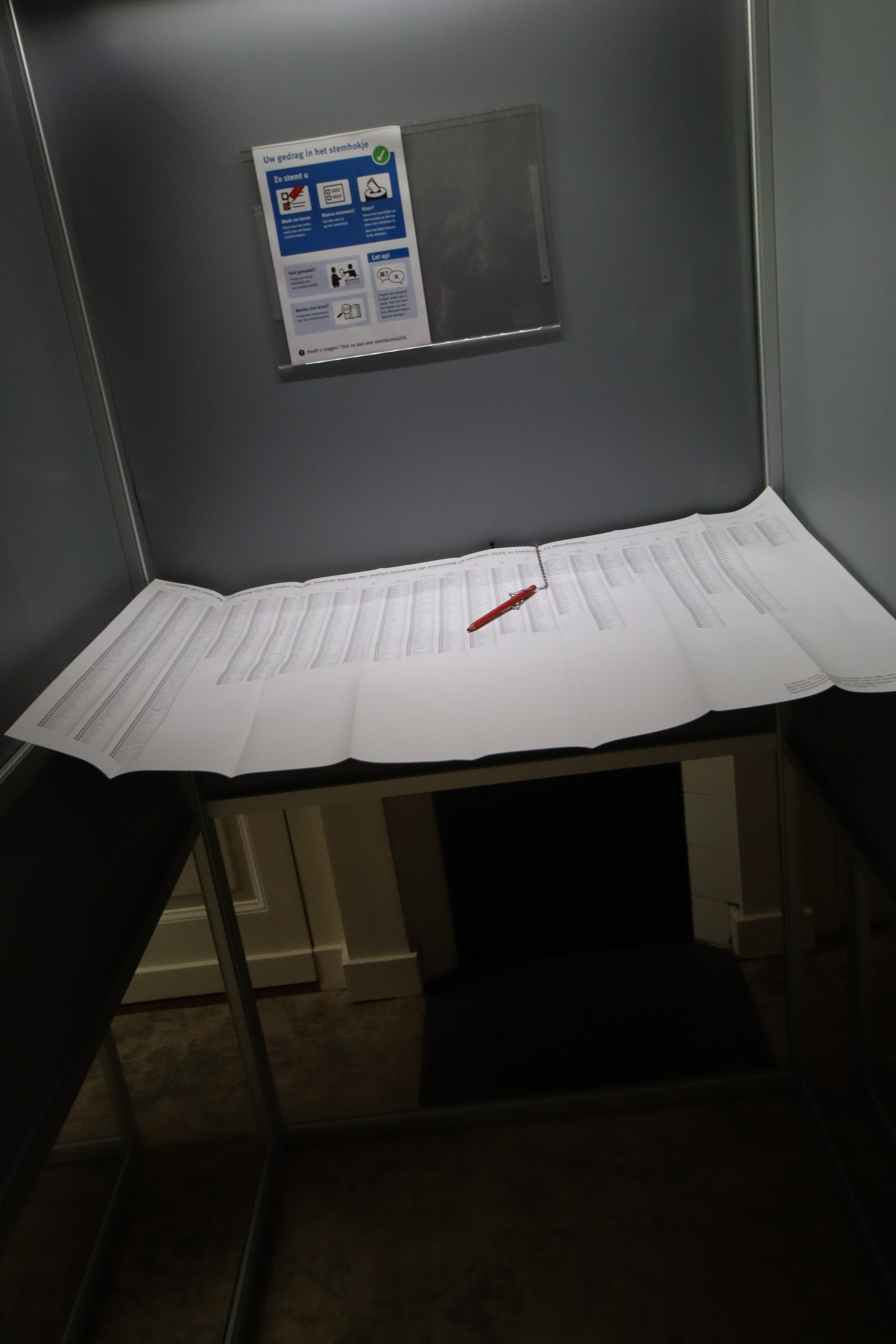
Voting ballot for the elections in Delft

Pursuant to articles C.1, C.2 and C.3 of the electoral law, elections for the House of Representatives take place every four years in March, unless a snap election is called. The 150 members of the House of Representatives are elected through semi-open lists under proportional representation in a single nationwide constituency. The number of seats per list is determined using the D'Hondt method. A list must receive a number of votes equal to or exceeding the Hare quota (1 full seat) in order to qualify for seat distribution, meaning there is an electoral threshold of 0.67%.

Voters have the option to cast a preferential vote. The seats won by a list are first allocated to the candidates who, in preferential votes, have received at least 25% of the Hare quota (effectively ¼ of a seat or 0.17% of the total votes), regardless of their placement on the electoral list. If multiple candidates from a list pass this threshold, their ordering is determined based on the number of votes received. Any remaining seats are allocated to candidates according to their position on the electoral list.

== Parties and lead candidates ==
List	Party		Lead candidate	Ideology	2023 result	Electoral districts
1	Party for Freedom	PVV	Geert Wilders	Nationalism; Right-wing populism	23.49% (37 seats)	20
2	GroenLinks–PvdA	GL/PvdA	Frans Timmermans	Social democracy Green politics	15.75% (25 seats)	20
3	People's Party for Freedom and Democracy	VVD	Dilan Yeşilgöz	Conservative liberalism	15.24% (24 seats)	20
4	New Social Contract	NSC	Eddy van Hijum	Christian democracy	12.88% (20 seats)	20
5	Democrats 66	D66	Rob Jetten	Social liberalism Progressivism	6.29% (9 seats)	20
6	Farmer–Citizen Movement	BBB	Caroline van der Plas	Agrarianism; Right-wing populism	4.65% (7 seats)	20
7	Christian Democratic Appeal	CDA	Henri Bontenbal	Christian democracy Conservatism (Note: Multiple sources: "Netherlands profile – Timeline". BBC News. 12 December 2022.; Camut, Nicolas (16 March 2023). "Dutch pro-farmers party wins big in provincial elections". Politico.; "Dutch to vote in Covid-dominated election". France24. 15 March 2021.; Hardy, Catherine (9 October 2017). "Dutch coalition partners agree government deal". Euronews.; "Netherlands poll surprise: Anti-EU parties fall short". Deutsche Welle (DW). 24 May 2019.)	3.31% (5 seats)	20
8	Socialist Party	SP	Jimmy Dijk	Democratic socialism Left-wing populism Cultural conservatism	3.15% (5 seats)	20
9	Denk	Denk	Stephan van Baarle	Social democracy Social conservatism Minority interests	2.37% (3 seats)	20
10	Party for the Animals	PvdD	Esther Ouwehand	Animal rights Environmentalism	2.25% (3 seats)	20
11	Forum for Democracy	FVD	Lidewij de Vos	National conservatism Right-wing populism	2.23% (3 seats)	20
12	Reformed Political Party	SGP	Chris Stoffer	Christian right Social conservatism	2.08% (3 seats)	20
13	Christian Union	CU	Mirjam Bikker	Christian democracy Social conservatism	2.04% (3 seats)	20
14	Volt Netherlands	Volt	Laurens Dassen	Social liberalism European federalism	1.71% (2 seats)	20
15	JA21	JA21	Joost Eerdmans	Conservative liberalism Right-wing populism	0.68% (1 seat)	20
16	Peace for Animals	VvD	Pascale Plusquin	Animal rights Pacifism	—	20
17	Interest of the Netherlands	BVNL	Wybren van Haga	Classical liberalism Right-wing populism	0.51% (0 seats)	20
18	Bij1	BIJ1	Tofik Dibi	Socialism; Anti-racism	0.42% (0 seats)	20
19	Libertarian Party	LP	Tom van Lamoen	Libertarianism	0.04% (0 seats)	19
20	50Plus	50+	Jan Struijs	Pensioners' interests	0.49% (0 seats)	19
21	Pirate Party	PPNL	Matthijs Pontier	Privacy advocacy	0.09% (0 seats)	18
22	Frisian National Party	FNP	Aant Jelle Soepboer	Regionalism; Frisians interests	—	16
23	Free Alliance	VV	Bart Burggraaf	Classical liberalism	—	13
24	De Linie	DL	Gerard van Hooft		—	10
25	Netherlands with a Plan	NLPLAN	Kok Kuen Chan		0.05% (0 seats)	9
26	Ellect	ELLECT	Joana Amoah		—	5
27	Party for the Rule of Law	PVDR	Danielle Tulp		—	2

== Campaign ==
According to polls, the housing market, immigration, and healthcare were the main topics in the months prior to the election. GroenLinks–PvdA (GL/PvdA), Democrats 66 (D66), the Christian Democratic Appeal (CDA), the Socialist Party (SP), the Christian Union (CU), and Volt included the reduction of the mortgage interest deduction in their party manifestos. That was opposed by the Party for Freedom (PVV), the People's Party for Freedom and Democracy (VVD), New Social Contract (NSC), the Farmer–Citizen Movement (BBB), and Forum for Democracy (FvD).

According to the Bureau for Economic Policy Analysis, GL/PvdA and BBB wanted to keep the halving of the deductible for healthcare, whereas VVD, CDA, Volt, and JA21 wanted to increase it to €440. GL-PvdA, D66, CU, and Volt wanted more wealth tax and profit tax, in contrast to VVD, BBB, and JA21, all of which did not want that and wanted to cut back on development aid. VVD, NSC, and the Reformed Political Party (SGP) did not want additional measures to reach climate goals, and BBB and JA21 wanted to emit more CO_{2}.

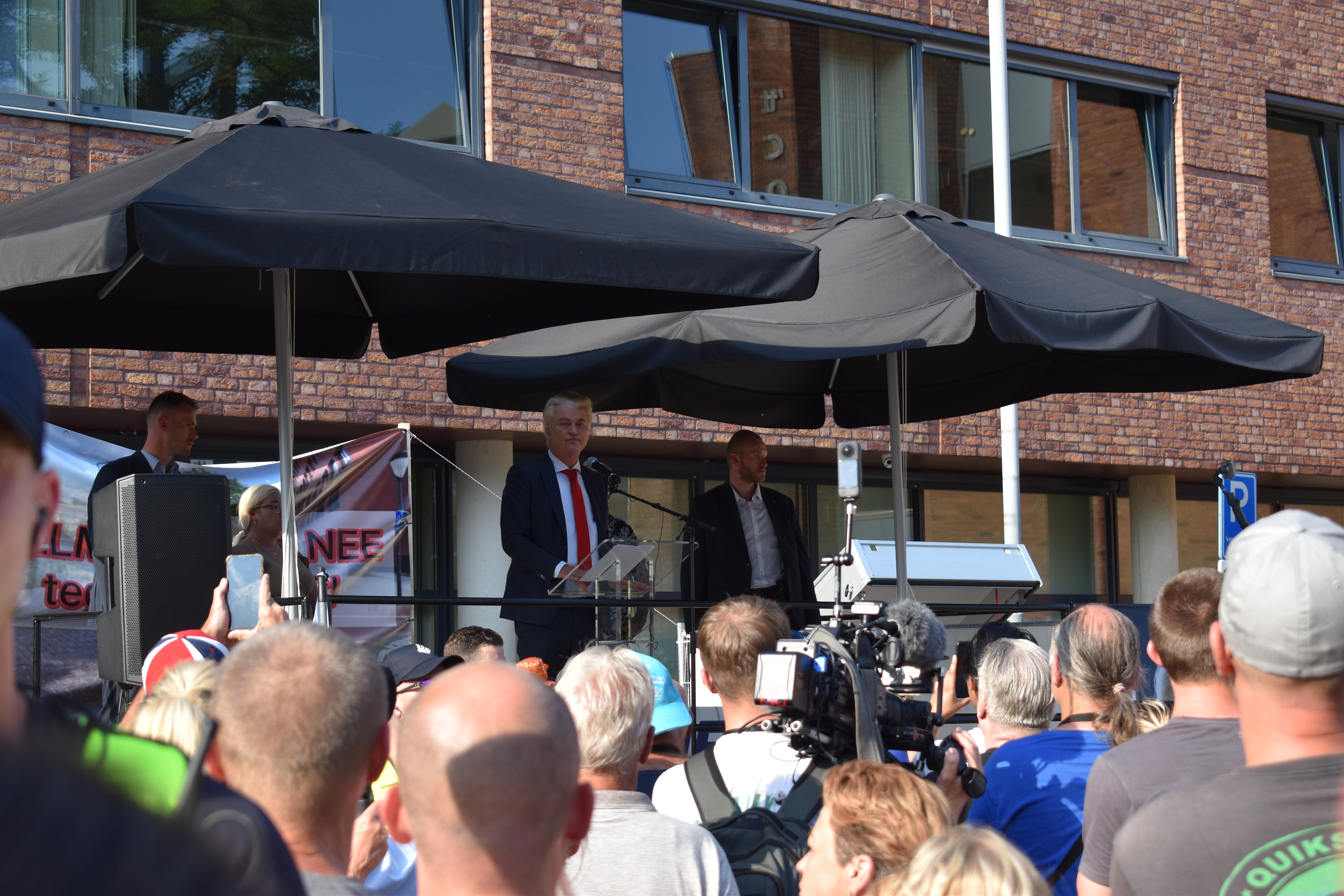
Wilders attending a protest against an asylum seeker center in Helmond in July 2025

PVV leader Geert Wilders attended protests against asylum seeker centers in Helmond and Zwolle, urging municipalities to defy the Dispersal Act, and making these protests a central part of his election campaign. This approach drew criticism from local politicians and the Association of Netherlands Municipalities, who accused Wilders of improper interference in local politics and of inciting unnecessary fear and division. In August 2025, a discrimination hotline and Muslim organisations filed complaints against Wilders over a tweet comparing a young blonde woman with PVV and an older woman wearing a headscarf with the Labour Party (PvdA). The tweet drew a record amount of complaints to the hotline and was compared to Nazi propaganda.

A ban against political advertisement on platforms of Meta started on 6 October 2025. In the month leading up to the ban, FvD and D66 spent the most money on advertisements on Facebook and Instagram. On 10 October, Wilders was named as a target of a terror cell, for which three men were arrested a day earlier. The National Coordinator for Security and Counterterrorism did not expect any remaining threat; however, citing bad feelings, Wilders suspended his campaign. On 15 October, he resumed his campaign.

=== Possible coalitions ===
Multiple parties, including GL/PvdA, VVD, and CDA, stated they would not want to form a government with PVV. Wilders stated he wanted to govern, possibly in a minority government. GL/PvdA and VVD both stated they would rather not govern with each other but did not rule out working together in a government. VVD preferred a centre-right coalition that included D66, BBB, CDA, and JA21, while D66 opposed any right-wing coalition and instead favored a national unity government, involving both left-wing and right-wing parties. JA21 did not rule out any party to govern with, although party leader Joost Eerdmans stated he did not see JA21 in a cabinet with GL/PvdA or D66.

=== Debates ===
Dutch general election debates, 2025
Date	Title or organizer	Channel	P Present; S Substitute present; A Absent; NI Not invited															Ref.
Date	Title or organizer	Channel	Van Baarle	Bikker	Bontenbal	Dassen	Dijk	Eerdmans	Van Hijum	Jetten	Ouwehand	Van der Plas	Stoffer	Timmermans	De Vos	Wilders	Yeşilgöz	Ref.
10 October	NOS	NPO Radio 1	P	P	P	A	P	P	P	P	P	P	P	P	P	A	P	
12 October	WNL op Zondag (Note: Debate with the parties' second-placed candidates: Sebastiaan Stöteler (PVV), Esmah Lahlah (GL-PvdA), Eelco Heinen (VVD), Jan Paternotte (D66), Hanneke Steen (CDA), and Annabel Nanninga (JA21).)	NPO 1	NI	NI	S	NI	NI	S	NI	S	NI	NI	NI	S	NI	S	S	
12 October	RTL Nieuws	RTL 4	NI	NI	P	NI	NI	NI	NI	P	NI	NI	NI	P	NI	A	P	
19 October	RTL Tonight	RTL 4	NI	NI	P	NI	P	P	NI	P	NI	NI	NI	P	NI	A	P	
23 October	Het Debat van Nederland	SBS6	NI	NI	P	NI	NI	NI	NI	NI	NI	NI	NI	P	NI	P	P	
25 October	Debat van het Zuiden	Omroep Brabant, Omroep Zeeland and L1	NI	NI	P	NI	P	P	NI	P	NI	NI	NI	P	NI	P	P	
26 October	NOS Jeugdjournaal	NPO 3	NI	NI	P	NI	NI	NI	P	P	NI	NI	NI	P	NI	P	P	
27 October	EenVandaag	NPO 1	NI	NI	P	NI	NI	P	NI	P	NI	NI	NI	P	NI	P	P	
28 October	NOS	NPO 1	P	P	NI	P	NI	NI	NI	NI	P	NI	P	NI	P	NI	NI	
28 October	NOS	NPO 1	NI	NI	P	NI	P	P	P	P	NI	P	NI	P	NI	P	P	

== Opinion polls ==
After rising in the polls in the first months after the 2023 Dutch general election, the Party for Freedom (PVV) declined from March 2024 onwards; however, it continued to lead. GroenLinks–PvdA (GL/PvdA) consistently polled in second place, between 22 and 30 seats. The Christian Democratic Appeal (CDA) rose consistently in the polls, at first at the expense of New Social Contract (NSC) and later of the People's Party for Freedom and Democracy (VVD). In the final months before the election, JA21 also rose significantly in the polls, as did Democrats 66 (D66).

== Results ==
Democrats 66 (D66), led by Rob Jetten, narrowly beat Geert Wilders's Party for Freedom (PVV), winning 16.9% of the vote to PVV's 16.7%, and tying with PVV at 26 seats in the House of Representatives. D66 gained 17 seats compared to the 2023 election, while the PVV lost 11 seats. The People's Party for Freedom and Democracy (VVD) of Dilan Yeşilgöz came third with 14.2% of the vote and 22 seats, losing 2 compared to the 2023 election, followed by the GroenLinks–PvdA (GL/PvdA) alliance, led by Frans Timmermans, which obtained 12.8% of the vote and 20 seats, losing 5. The Christian Democratic Appeal (CDA) under Henri Bontenbal achieved a notable resurgence, securing 11.8% of the vote and 18 seats, gaining 13 since 2023.

Among smaller parties, JA21 rose to win 6.0% of the vote and 9 seats, an increase of 8 from the 2023 election, while the Forum for Democracy (FvD) gained 4.5% of the vote and 7 seats, an increase of 4. The Farmer–Citizen Movement (BBB) saw a sharp decline to 2.7% and 4 seats, a loss of 3. DENK, the Reformed Political Party (SGP), the Party for the Animals (PvdD), and the Christian Union (CU) each remained at 3 seats, with the Socialist Party (SP) reduced to the same number, losing 2 seats. 50PLUS returned to parliament with two seats, while Volt lost one of two seats. The New Social Contract (NSC) faced the largest defeat, losing all of their 20 seats.

Party for Freedom leader Geert Wilders shared messages on X that suggested electoral fraud in Maastricht, Leiden and Zaanstad. The three municipalities denied any wrongdoing. The posts were regarded as an unprecedented step from Wilders' side, which some political scientists compared to Donald Trump's attempt to discredit the 2020 American presidential election.

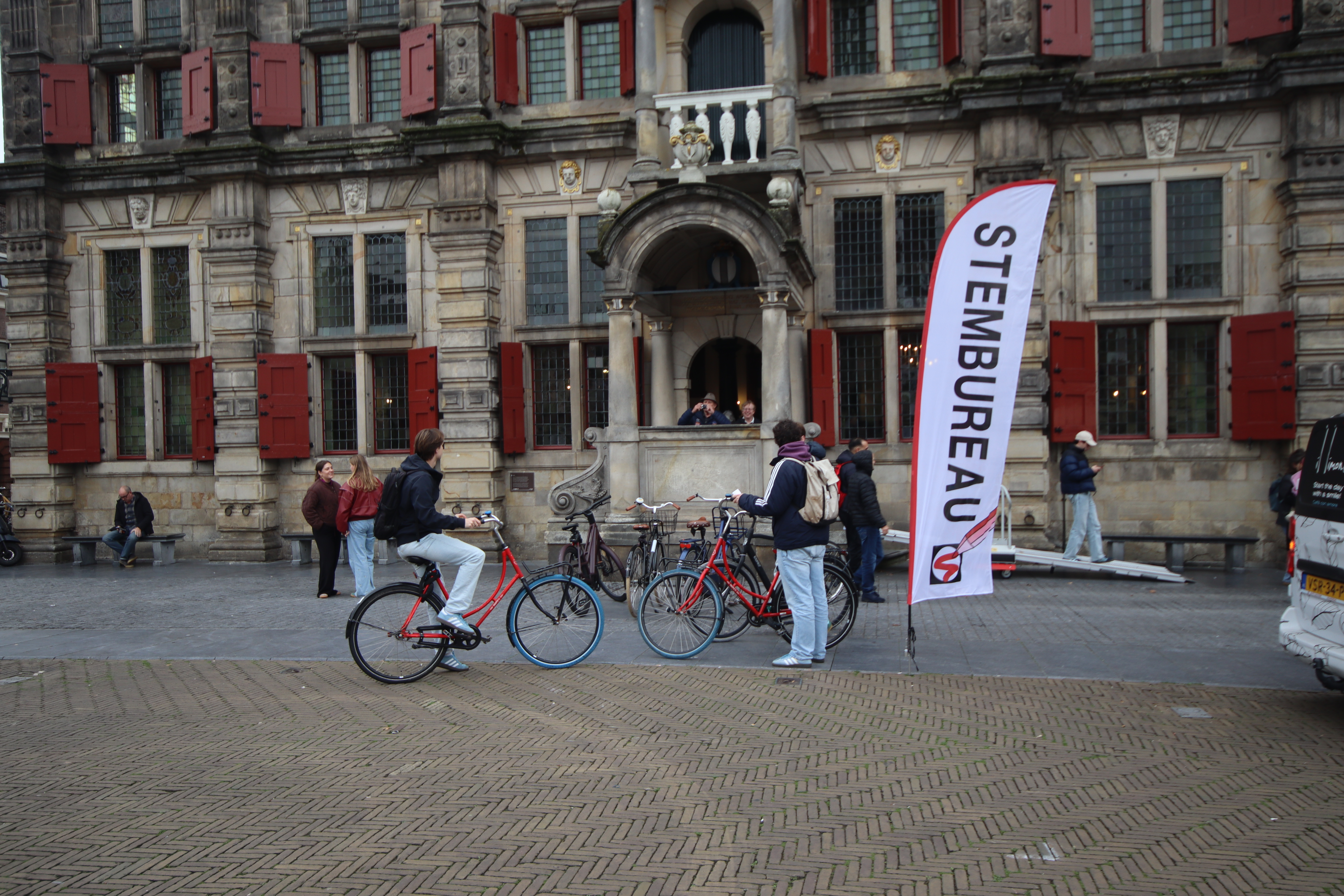
Delft City Hall as a polling station on election day 2025

Party	Votes	%	+/–	Seats	+/–
Democrats 66	1,790,634	16.94	+10.65	26	+17
Party for Freedom	1,760,966	16.66	–6.83	26	−11
People's Party for Freedom and Democracy	1,505,829	14.24	–1.00	22	−2
GroenLinks–PvdA	1,352,163	12.79	–2.98	20	−5
Christian Democratic Appeal	1,246,874	11.79	+8.48	18	+13
JA21	628,517	5.95	+5.27	9	+8
Forum for Democracy	480,393	4.54	+2.31	7	+4
Farmer–Citizen Movement	279,916	2.65	–2.00	4	−3
Denk	250,368	2.37	+0.00	3	0
Reformed Political Party	238,093	2.25	+0.17	3	0
Party for the Animals	219,371	2.08	–0.17	3	0
Christian Union	201,361	1.90	–0.14	3	0
Socialist Party	199,585	1.89	–1.26	3	−2
50PLUS	151,053	1.43	+0.94	2	+2
Volt Netherlands	116,468	1.10	–0.61	1	−1
Bij1	40,360	0.38	–0.04	0	0
New Social Contract	39,408	0.37	–12.51	0	−20
Interest of the Netherlands	18,477	0.17	–0.34	0	0
Peace for Animals	16,819	0.16	New	0	New
Pirate Party	10,575	0.10	+0.01	0	0
Frisian National Party	9,331	0.09	New	0	New
Libertarian Party	8,248	0.08	+0.04	0	0
De Linie	3,478	0.03	New	0	New
Netherlands with a Plan	2,299	0.02	–0.03	0	0
Free Alliance	1,048	0.01	New	0	New
Ellect	205	0.00	New	0	New
Party for the Rule of Law	151	0.00	New	0	New
Total	10,571,990	100.00	–	150	0
Valid votes	10,571,990	99.36			
Invalid votes	28,206	0.27			
Blank votes	40,128	0.38			
Total votes	10,640,324	100.00			
Registered voters/turnout	13,589,128	78.30			
Source: Kiesraad

=== By province ===
Results by province
Province	D66	PVV	VVD	GL/PvdA	CDA	JA21	FvD	BBB	Denk	SGP	PvdD	CU	SP	50+	Volt	Others
Drenthe	14.0%	19.2%	14.5%	11.8%	12.8%	5.4%	6.2%	5.1%	0.5%	1.0%	1.4%	2.4%	2.3%	1.8%	0.7%	0.9%
Flevoland	13.9%	19.0%	13.7%	10.7%	9.4%	5.8%	6.0%	3.0%	3.6%	4.5%	1.8%	2.6%	1.9%	1.5%	0.8%	1.8%
Friesland	13.3%	17.2%	12.0%	12.2%	15.4%	5.6%	6.8%	5.0%	0.4%	1.3%	1.5%	2.5%	2.1%	1.3%	0.7%	2.7%
Gelderland	16.2%	15.9%	13.9%	12.4%	12.8%	5.8%	4.5%	3.1%	1.4%	4.4%	1.9%	2.6%	1.7%	1.3%	1.0%	1.1%
Groningen	16.8%	16.4%	11.2%	16.6%	11.1%	3.8%	5.1%	3.5%	0.7%	1.1%	2.5%	3.1%	4.4%	1.2%	1.2%	1.3%
Limburg	14.0%	25.6%	14.0%	10.5%	13.3%	6.1%	4.8%	2.6%	1.2%	0.1%	1.5%	0.4%	2.0%	1.9%	0.8%	1.2%
North Brabant	17.8%	19.1%	16.7%	10.1%	13.0%	6.7%	4.0%	2.4%	1.8%	0.5%	1.5%	0.6%	1.9%	1.8%	1.0%	1.1%
North Holland	20.4%	13.2%	15.3%	16.7%	8.1%	5.3%	4.2%	2.2%	3.4%	0.4%	3.1%	1.0%	2.0%	1.3%	1.4%	2.0%
Overijssel	13.8%	16.7%	13.0%	9.9%	15.7%	6.3%	5.3%	4.8%	1.3%	3.3%	1.3%	3.4%	1.7%	1.3%	0.9%	1.3%
South Holland	16.7%	16.4%	13.7%	12.8%	10.8%	6.6%	4.3%	1.5%	4.0%	3.1%	2.3%	2.2%	1.7%	1.4%	1.2%	1.3%
Utrecht	20.4%	11.9%	13.6%	15.8%	11.3%	5.1%	3.4%	1.6%	3.2%	2.9%	2.7%	2.7%	1.5%	1.0%	1.6%	1.3%
Zeeland	12.0%	17.6%	13.6%	9.1%	13.3%	6.1%	5.2%	3.1%	0.8%	10.2%	1.3%	2.7%	1.7%	1.6%	0.6%	1.1%
Caribbean Netherlands	24.4%	11.1%	11.3%	13.5%	7.1%	2.9%	4.4%	1.3%	0.3%	0.4%	1.8%	13.8%	2.0%	0.0%	2.2%	4.5%
Postal voters abroad	18.6%	8.6%	9.7%	29.1%	10.3%	4.5%	3.6%	1.4%	0.4%	0.7%	3.9%	1.3%	1.8%	0.5%	4.2%	1.4%

== Aftermath ==
The election produced a fragmented outcome, with Democrats 66 (D66) attaining the lowest result for the largest party in Dutch history, although it is D66's best-ever result in a general election, breaking its record of 24 seats of the 1994 and 2021 elections. The Party for Freedom (PVV) lost seats like the other parties of the Schoof cabinet: the People's Party for Freedom and Democracy (VVD), New Social Contract (NSC), and the Farmer–Citizen Movement (BBB). VVD achieved its joint-worst result since 22 seats in the 2006 election, although the party had been projected to perform worse in several opinion polls leading up to the election. NSC lost all of its 20 seats, the biggest loss for a Dutch party since the Labour Party (PvdA) lost 29 seats in the 2017 election. JA21 achieved its best-ever result in general elections with 9 seats. The Forum for Democracy (FvD) nearly regained all of the support that the party had lost in the 2023 election, winning 7 seats. The Socialist Party (SP) got its worst results since its entry into the parliament following the 1994 election. 50Plus re-entered parliament with 2 seats, having been shut out in 2023. Following the release of the exit poll, Frans Timmermans announced that he would resign from the leadership of GroenLinks–PvdA (GL/PvdA).

Rob Jetten, leader of D66, considered GL-PvdA a logical coalition partner along with VVD and the Christian Democratic Appeal (CDA). Geert Wilders conceded that PVV was unlikely to be part of the next government. On 4 November, Wouter Koolmees was selected as scout, after being nominated by the largest party, D66. On his advice, D66 and CDA started substantial negotiations guided by informateurs Hans Wijers and Sybrand Buma. Wijers subsequently stepped down after a private message of his was leaked where he criticized VVD leader Dilan Yeşilgöz.

The 2025 Speaker of the Dutch House of Representatives election was held on 18 November 2025, with incumbent speaker Martin Bosma (PVV) seeking re-election, before being defeated by Thom van Campen (VVD).

On 8 December, informateur Sybrand Buma presented his recommendation for D66, VVD, and CDA to proceed with negotiations on a "basic governing agreement", while still keeping the option of a majority coalition open. On 10 December, president of Maastricht University Rianne Letschert was appointed as informateur, with the assignment proposed by Buma and a deadline of 30 January.

On the morning of 9 January, Letschert demanded that the party leaders of D66, VVD, and CDA choose the form of the coalition, otherwise she would resign as informateur. D66 and CDA had become increasingly open to a minority cabinet and persuaded the VVD after Letschert's intervention. GL-PvdA, D66, CDA, VVD and other smaller parties continued to exclude the PVV. Because VVD ruled out a coalition with GL-PvdA, and D66 was unwilling to govern alongside both JA21 and VVD, no majority could be found.

The Jetten cabinet was sworn in on February 23, 2026. The cabinet is formed by D66, VVD, and CDA. Together, these three parties hold 66 of the 150 seats in the House of Representatives and 22 of the 75 seats in the Senate, making this a minority cabinet.
