= Henk ten Hoeve =

Dutch politician (born 1946)

Leader of the Independent Senate Group in the Senate
- In office 9 June 2015 – 11 June 2019
- Preceded by: Kees de Lange
- In office 10 June 2003 – 7 June 2011
- Preceded by: Marten Bierman
- Succeeded by: Kees de Lange

Member of the Provincial Council of Friesland
- In office 1980–1988

Chairman of the Frisian National Party
- In office 1976–1980

Personal details
- Born: Hendrik ten Hoeve; 15 September 1946 (age 80) Heerenveen, Netherlands
- Party: Independent Senate Group
- Other political affiliations: Frisian National Party
- Education: Erasmus University Rotterdam

Hendrik (Henk) ten Hoeve (born 15 September 1946) is a Dutch politician. He led the Independent Senate Group (OSF) in the Senate from 10 June 2003 until 7 June 2011, and again from 9 June 2015 to 11 June 2019.

Ten Hoeve was born in Heerenveen. He studied economics at the Netherlands School of Economics in Rotterdam. He is the leader of the board of directors of the Dockingacollege school in Dokkum, having been one of its economics teachers and then its "conrector" (deputy head). From 1976 to 1980, Ten Hoeve was chairman of the Frisian National Party and from 1980 to 1988 the party's leader in the Provincial Council of Friesland.

In 2003, in the election for the Senate, he won one vote more than the party leader Fons Zinken. Thus Ten Hoeve was placed as number two on the voted preference list. In 2007, he was re-elected. He was also re-elected in 2015.
