= European Free Alliance =

Regionalist European political party

- Abbreviation: EFA
- President: Lorena Lopez de Lacalle
- Secretary-General: Oriol Cases i Vilà
- Founded: 9 July 1981; 45 years ago
- Headquarters: Boomkwekerijstraat 1, 1000 Brussels, Belgium
- Think tank: Coppieters Foundation
- Youth wing: European Free Alliance Youth
- Membership (22 December 2025): 3
- Ideology: Regionalism; Autonomism; Separatism
- Political position: Big tent
- European Parliament group: Greens/EFA (3 MEPs); ECR Group (N-VA, 3 MEPs); EPP Group (Manuela Ripa, direct member); The Left (Pernando Barrena, direct member)
- Colours: Purple
- European Parliament: 8 / 720
- European Commission: 0 / 27
- European Council: 1 / 27
- EU lower/unicameral houses: 40 / 6,217
- EU upper houses: 16 / 1,459

Website
- efaparty.eu

The European Free Alliance (EFA) is a European political party that consists of various regionalist, separatist and minority political parties in Europe. Member parties advocate either for full political independence and sovereignty, or some form of devolution or self-governance for their country or region. The party has generally limited its membership to centre-left and left-wing parties; therefore, only a fraction of European regionalist parties are members of the EFA. Since 1999, the EFA and the European Green Party (EGP) have joined forces within Greens–European Free Alliance (Greens/EFA) group in the European Parliament, although some EFA members have joined other groups from time to time, for example the New Flemish Alliance which sits with the European Conservatives and Reformists Group.

The EFA is represented in the European Council by Bart De Wever of the New Flemish Alliance, who has served as Prime Minister of Belgium since 2025. Two EU regions are led by EFA politicians: Flanders with Matthias Diependaele of the New Flemish Alliance and Corsica with Gilles Giovannangeli of Femu a Corsica. Additionally, Scotland is led by John Swinney of the Scottish National Party and Wales is led by Rhun ap Iorwerth of Plaid Cymru.

The EFA's youth wing is the European Free Alliance Youth (EFAY), established in 2000.

== History ==
Regionalists have long been represented in the European Parliament. In the 1979 election four regionalist parties obtained seats: the Scottish National Party (SNP), the Flemish People's Union (VU), the Brussels-based Democratic Front of Francophones (FDF) and the South Tyrolean People's Party (SVP). The SNP, although being predominantly social-democratic, joined the European Progressive Democrats, a conservative group led by the French Rally for the Republic. The VU and the FDF joined the heterogeneous Technical Group of Independents, while the SVP joined the European People's Party group.

In 1981, six parties (VU, the Frisian National Party, Independent Fianna Fáil, the Party of German-speaking Belgians, the Party for the Organization of a Free Brittany and the Alsace-Lorraine National Association), plus three observers (the Union of the Corsican People, UPC, the Occitan Party and the Democratic Convergence of Catalonia, CDC), joined forces to form the European Free Alliance. Regionalist MEPs continued, however, to sit in different groups also after the 1984 election: the SNP in the Gaullist-dominated European Democratic Alliance; the VU, the Sardinian Action Party (PSd'Az) and Basque Solidarity (EA) in the Rainbow Group, together with Green parties; the SVP in the European People's Party group; the CDC with the Liberal Democrats; and Herri Batasuna among Non-Inscrits.

Only after the 1989 European Parliament election did EFA members form a united group, called Rainbow like its green predecessor. It consisted of three Italian MEPs (two for Lega Lombarda and one for the PSd'Az), two Spanish MEPs (one each for the PNV and the Andalusian Party, PA), one Belgian MEP (for VU), one French MEP (UPC), one British MEP (SNP) and one independent MEP from Ireland. They were joined by 4 MEPs from the Danish left-wing Eurosceptic People's Movement against the EU, while the other regionalist parties, including the SVP, Batasuna and the Convergence and Union of Catalonia (CiU) declined to join.

In the 1994 European Parliament election, the regionalists lost many seats. Moreover, the EFA had suspended its major affiliate, Lega Nord, for having joined forces in government with the post-fascist National Alliance. Also, the PNV chose to switch to the European People's Party (EPP). The three remaining EFA MEPs (representing the SNP, the VU and the Canarian Coalition) formed a group with the French Énergie Radicale list and the Italian Pannella List: the European Radical Alliance.

Following the 1999 European Parliament election, in which EFA parties did quite well, EFA elected MEPs formed a joint group with the European Green Party, under the name Greens–European Free Alliance (Greens/EFA). In the event, the EFA supplied ten members: two each from the Scottish SNP, the Welsh Plaid Cymru (PC), and the Flemish VU, and one each from the Basque PNV and EA, the Andalusian PA and the Galician Nationalist Bloc (BNG).

In the 2004 European Parliament election, the EFA, which had formally become a European political party, was reduced to four MEPs: two from the SNP (Ian Hudghton and Alyn Smith), one from PC (Jill Evans) and one from the Republican Left of Catalonia (ERC; Bernat Joan i Marí, replaced at the mid-term by MEP Mikel Irujo of the Basque EA). They were joined by two associate members: Tatjana Ždanoka of For Human Rights in United Latvia (PCTVL) and László Tőkés, an independent MEP and former member of the Democratic Alliance of Hungarians in Romania (UMDR). Co-operation between the EFA and the Greens continued.

Following the 2008 revision of the EU Regulation that governs European political parties allowing the creation of European foundations affiliated to European political parties, the EFA established its official foundation/think tank, the Coppieters Foundation (CF), in September 2007.

In the 2009 European Parliament election, six MEPs were returned for the EFA: two from the SNP (Ian Hudghton and Alyn Smith), one from PC (Jill Evans), one from the Party of the Corsican Nation (PNC; François Alfonsi), one from the ERC (Oriol Junqueras), and Tatjana Ždanoka, an individual member of the EFA from Latvia. After the election, the New Flemish Alliance (N-VA) also joined the EFA. The EFA subgroup thus counted seven MEPs.

In the 2014 European Parliament election, EFA-affiliated parties returned twelve seats to the Parliament: four for the N-VA, two for the SNP, two for "The Left for the Right to Decide" (an electoral list primarily composed of the ERC), one for "The Peoples Decide" (an electoral list mainly comprising EH Bildu, a Basque coalition including EA), one for "European Spring" (an electoral list comprising the Valencian Nationalist Bloc, BNV, and the Aragonese Union, ChA), one from PC, and one from the Latvian Russian Union (LKS). Due to ideological divergences with the Flemish Greens, the N-VA defected to the European Conservatives and Reformists Group (ECR) and the EH Bildu MEP joined the European United Left–Nordic Green Left (GUE/NGL) group. Thus, EFA had seven members in the Greens/EFA group and four within ECR.

In the 2019 European Parliament election the EFA gained a fourth seat in the United Kingdom, due to the SNP gaining a third seat to add to PC's one. However, the EFA suffered the loss of these seats in January 2020 due to Brexit, which meant SNP and PC MEPs had to leave.

== Ideology ==
In the Brussels declaration of 2000, the EFA codified its political principles. The EFA stands for "a Europe of Free Peoples based on the principle of subsidiarity, which believe in solidarity with each other and the peoples of the world". The EFA sees itself as an alliance of stateless peoples, striving towards recognition, autonomy, independence or wanting a proper voice in Europe. It supports European integration on basis of the subsidiarity-principle. It believes also that Europe should move away from further centralisation and works towards the formation of a "Europe of regions". It believes that regions should have more power in Europe, for instance participating in the Council of the European Union, when matters within their competence are discussed. It also wants to protect the linguistic and cultural diversity within the EU.

The EFA broadly stands on the left wing of the political spectrum. EFA members are generally progressive, although there have been some notable exceptions as the conservative New Flemish Alliance, Bavaria Party, Democratic Party of Artsakh, Schleswig Party and Future of Åland, the Christian-democratic Slovene Union and the national-conservative (and often characterised as far-right) South Tyrolean Freedom, which left over policy disagreements in 2024.

== Organisation ==
The main organs of the EFA organisation are the General Assembly, the Bureau and the Secretariat.

=== General Assembly ===
In the General Assembly, the supreme council of the EFA, every member party has one vote.

=== Bureau and Secretariat ===
The Bureau takes care of daily affairs. It is chaired by Lorena Lopez de Lacalle (Eusko Alkartasuna), president of the EFA, while Oriol Cases i Vilà (Republican Left of Catalonia) is secretary-general and Anke Spoorendonk (South Schleswig Voters' Association) vice-president and treasurer.

The Bureau is completed by other ten vice-presidents: Wouter Patho (New Flemish Alliance), Frank de Boer (Frisian National Party), Livia Ceccaldi-Volpei (Fermu a Corsica), Zsolt Szilágyi (Hungarian Alliance of Transylvania), Roberto Visentin (Pact for Autonomy), Carmen Ria Smith (Plaid Cymru), Celeste López (New Canaries), Kerem Abdurahimoğlu (Party of Friendship, Equality and Peace), Lydie Massard (Breton Democratic Union) and Maiken Poulsen Englund (Future of Åland).

== Membership ==
Before becoming a member party, an organisation needs to have been an observer of the EFA for at least one year. Only one member party per region is allowed. If a second party from a region wants to join the EFA, the first party needs to agree, at which point these two parties will then form a common delegation with one vote. The EFA also recognises friends of the EFA, a special status for regionalist parties outside of the European Union.

The following is the list of EFA members and former members.

=== Full members ===
Country	Party	Region / Constituency	MRPs	MPs	MEPs (Note: The number of MEPs listed below may not match the total number of MEPs of the European party, as it does not include MEPs who join as individual members.)
Albania	Macedonian Alliance for European Integration	Ethnic Macedonians	–	–	Not in the EU
Azerbaijan	Democratic Party of Artsakh	Republic of Artsakh / Ethnic Armenians	–	–	Not in the EU
Austria	Unity List	Carinthia / Ethnic Slovenes	–	–	–
Belgium	New Flemish Alliance	Flanders	31 / 124	23 / 150 10 / 60	3 / 21
Bulgaria	United Macedonian Organization Ilinden–Pirin	Pirin / Ethnic Macedonians	–	–	–
Czech Republic	Moravian Land Movement	Moravia	–	–	–
Denmark	Schleswig Party	Schleswig / Ethnic Germans	–	–	–
Finland	Future of Åland	Åland	–	–	–
France	Breton Democratic Union	Brittany	4 / 83	–	–
France	Catalan Unity	Northern Catalonia	–	–	–
France	Let's Make Corsica	Corsica	32 / 63	0 / 348 2 / 577	–
France	Occitan Party	Occitania	–	–	–
France	Our Land	Alsace	–	–	–
France	Party of the Corsican Nation	Corsica	7 / 63	0 / 348 1 / 577	–
Germany	Bavaria Party	Bavaria	–	–	–
Germany	South Schleswig Voters' Association	Schleswig-Holstein / Ethnic Danes / Frisians	4 / 69	1 / 630 (Bundestag) 0 / 69 (Bundesrat)	–
Greece	Party of Friendship, Equality and Peace	Western Thrace / Ethnic Turks	–	–	–
Italy	Free Sicilians	Sicily	–	–	–
Italy	Now Tuscany	Tuscany	–	–	–
Italy	Pact for Autonomy	Friuli-Venezia Giulia	5 / 48	–	–
Italy	Valdostan Union (Note: Expelled in 2007 after lack of activity in EFA structures, rejoined at the 2022 congress)	Aosta Valley	12 / 35	0 / 205 1 / 400	–
Italy	United Romagna	Romagna	–	–	–
Netherlands	Frisian National Party	Frisians / Friesland	4 / 43	1 / 75 0 / 150	–
Romania	Hungarian Alliance of Transylvania	Transylvania / Ethnic Hungarians	3 / 30 (Covasna County) 3 / 30 (Harghita County)	0 / 134 1 / 330	–
Serbia	League of Social Democrats of Vojvodina	Vojvodina / Ethnic minorities (e.g. Hungarians)	–	–	Not in the EU
Serbia	Roma Union of Serbia	Romani	–	–	Not in the EU
Spain	Andalusia by Herself	Andalusia	–	–	–
Spain	Aragonese State	Aragon	–	–	–
Spain	Aragonese Union	Aragon	6 / 67	–	–
Spain	Basque Solidarity	Basque Country	4 / 75	1 / 266 0 / 350	–
Spain	Galician Nationalist Bloc	Galicia	25 / 75	1 / 266 1 / 350	1 / 61
Spain	More–Commitment	Valencian Country	9 / 99	1 / 266 1 / 350	1 / 61
Spain	More for Menorca	Menorca	3 / 13 Island Council of Menorca) 2 / 59 Parliament of the Balearic Islands)	–	–
Spain	New Canaries	Canary Islands	5 / 70	–	–
Spain	Republican Left of Catalonia	Catalonia / Catalan Countries	20 / 135	4 / 266 7 / 350	1 / 61
Spain	Socialist Party of Majorca	Balearic Islands	–	–	–
United Kingdom	Mebyon Kernow	Cornwall	3 / 87	–	Not in the EU
United Kingdom	Plaid Cymru	Wales	44 / 96	2 / 766 4 / 650	Not in the EU
United Kingdom	Scottish National Party	Scotland	57 / 129	8 / 650	Not in the EU
United Kingdom	Yorkshire Party	Yorkshire	–	–	Not in the EU

=== Individual members ===
The EFA also includes a number of individual members, although, as most other European parties, it has not sought to develop mass individual membership.

Below is the evolution of individual membership of the EFA since 2019.

Country	Name	Region/constituency	Party
Finland	Harry Jansson MP	Åland	Åland Centre
Germany	Manuela Ripa MEP	–	Ecological Democratic Party
Spain	Pernando Barrena MEP	Basque Country	Sortu / EH Bildu

=== Former members ===
Country	Party	Region / Constituency	Notes
Belgium	Party of German-speaking Belgians	German Community	Merged into ProDG in 2008
Belgium	People's Union	Flanders	Split into the New Flemish Alliance and Spirit
Belgium	Pro German-speaking Community	German Community	No longer a member since 2018
Belgium	Social Liberal Party	Flanders	Dissolved in 2009
Belgium	Walloon Popular Rally	Wallonia	Dissolved as party in 2011
Croatia	List for Rijeka	Rijeka	No longer a member since 2023
Czech Republic	Moravané	Moravia	No longer a member since 2018
France	Alsace-Lorraine National Association	Alsace / Lorraine	Dissolved
France	Party for the Organization of a Free Brittany	Brittany	Dissolved in 2000
France	Savoyan League	Savoy	Dissolved in 2012
France	Savoy Region Movement	Savoy	No longer a member since 2025
France	Union of the Corsican People	Corsica	Merged into the PNC in 2002
Germany	The Frisians	Frisians / East Frisia	No longer a member since 2018
Germany	Lusatian Alliance	Lusatia / Sorbs	No longer a member since 2023
Greece	Rainbow	(North Macedonia) Ethnic Macedonians	No longer a member since 2023
Hungary	Renewed Roma Union Party of Hungary	Romani people	Dissolved in 2012
Ireland	Independent Fianna Fáil	United Ireland	Dissolved in 2006
Italy	Autonomy Liberty Participation Ecology	Aosta Valley	Merged into Valdostan Alliance in 2019
Italy	Citizens' Union for South Tyrol	South Tyrol	Expelled in 2008 for opposition to the Bilbao declaration
Italy	Emilian Free Alliance	Emilia	Dissolved in 2010
Italy	Friulian Homeland	Friuli	No longer a member after 2022 congress
Italy	Lombard League	Lombardy	Joined Lega Nord in 1991
Italy	Movement for the Independence of Sicily	Sicily	No longer a member after 2022 congress
Italy	Northern League	Padania	Suspended in 1994, left in 1996 and joined ELDR
Italy	Pro Lombardy Independence	Lombardy	No longer a member after 2022 congress
Italy	Sardinian Action Party	Sardinia	Expelled in 2020 for allying with the Lega Nord
Italy	Slovene Union	(Slovenia) Ethnic Slovenes	No longer a member since 2023
Italy	The Other South	Southern Italy	No longer a member after 2022 congress
Italy	Tuscany Freedom Committee	Tuscany	No longer a member in 2024
Italy	South Tyrolean Freedom	South Tyrol	Left in 2024
Italy	Valdostan Alliance	Aosta Valley	Merged into Valdostan Union in 2024
Italy	Venetian League	Veneto	Joined Lega Nord in 1991
Italy	Venetian Republic League	Veneto	No longer a member after 2022 congress
Latvia	Latvian Russian Union	Ethnic Russians	Expelled in 2022
Lithuania	Lithuanian Polish People's Party	(Poland) Ethnic Poles	Dissolved in 2010
Poland	Kashubian Association	Kashubia / Kashubians	No longer a member since 2023
Poland	Silesian Autonomy Movement	Upper Silesia / Silesians	No longer a member since 2023
Romania	Transylvania–Banat League	Transylvania (incl. Banat)	Dissolved
Slovakia	Hungarian Christian Democratic Association	(Hungary) Ethnic Hungarians	Merged into Most–Híd 2023 in 2023
Slovakia	Hungarian Federalist Party	(Hungary) Ethnic Hungarians	De-registered in 2005
Slovenia	The Olive Tree – Slovene Istria Party	Slovene Istria	No longer a member since 2025
Spain	Andalusian Party	Andalusia	Dissolved in 2015
Spain	Aralar Party	Basque Country	Dissolved in 2017
Spain	Basque Nationalist Party	Basque Country	Left in 2004 and joined the EDP
Spain	Canarian Coalition	Canary Islands	Left in 1999 and joined the ELDR Group
Spain	Democratic Convergence of Catalonia	Catalonia / Catalan Countries	Joined the LDR Group in 1987

== Funding ==
As a registered European political party, the EFA is entitled to European public funding, which it has received continuously since 2004.

Below is the evolution of European public funding received by the EFA.

In line with the Regulation on European political parties and European political foundations, the EFA also raises private funds to co-finance its activities. As of 2025, European parties must raise at least 10% of their reimbursable expenditure from private sources, while the rest can be covered using European public funding. (Note: For the purpose of European party funding, "contributions" refer to financial or in-kind support provided by party members, while "donations" refer to the same but provided by non-members.)

Below is the evolution of contributions and donations received by the EFA.

== Representation in European institutions ==
Organisation	Institution	Number of seats
European Union	European Parliament	8 / 720 (1%)
European Union	European Commission	0 / 27 (0%)
European Union	European Council (Heads of Government)	1 / 27 (4%)
European Union	Council of the European Union (Participation in Government)	
European Union	Committee of the Regions	17 / 329 (5%)
Council of Europe	Parliamentary Assembly	

== See also ==
- List of regional and minority parties in Europe
- List of active separatist movements in Europe
- Political parties of minorities
- Regionalism (politics)
- Free Nations of Post-Russia Forum
- European political party
- Authority for European Political Parties and European Political Foundations
- European political foundation
