= Nordeste Independente =

Separatist movement in Brazil

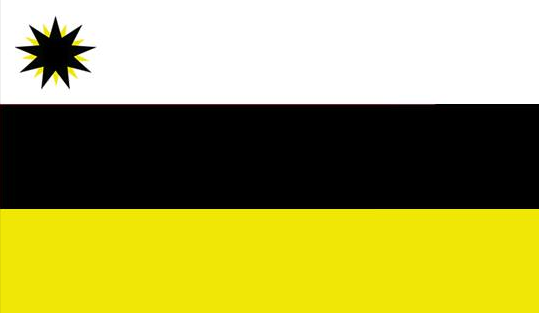
- Other name: Nordexit
- Leader: Jacques Ribemboim
- Country: Brazil
- Active regions: Northeast Region of Brazil
- Ideology: Separatism

Group of Studies on the Independent Northeast
- Grupo de Estudos para o Nordeste Independente
- Leader: Jacques Ribemboim
- Country: Brazil
- Headquarters: Federal University of Pernambuco
- Active regions: Northeast Region of Brazil
- Ideology: Separatism

Nordeste Independente (NEI) is an organization that seeks the independence of the Northeast Region of Brazil. It is represented by economist and engineer Jacques Ribemboim, who has promoted Northeastern separatism since the 1990s. In 2017, the group had around 57 members.

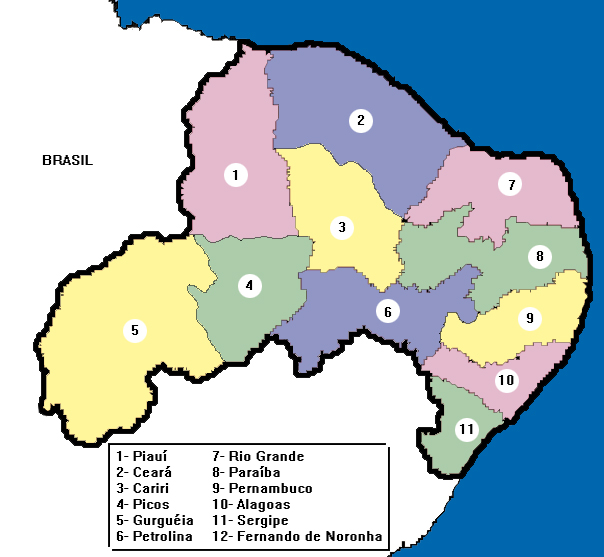
Map of the Republic of the Northeast proposed by NEI, showing the 12 states of the republic.

== History ==
The idea of the movement originated in the late 1980s, in an Economics class of 15 people at the Federal University of Pernambuco.

Between 1992 and 1994, Jacques Ribemboim created the Group of Studies on the Independent Northeast (Gesni), whose ideas are presented in his book Nordeste Independente. The Gesni proposed the secession and unification of the Northeastern states, with the exception of Bahia and Maranhão due to cultural differences between these regions and the rest of the Northeast. The new nation would be divided into 12 states and given the name "Republic of the Northeast". The Gesni was later succeeded by the NEI.

The NEI and other separatist movements in Brazil gained notoriety in 2016, after the conclusion of the Brexit referendum. On social media, the group began to be called "Nordexit".

== Motives ==
In the book Nordeste Independente, the reasons for the independence of the Northeast are presented, which encompass the natural desire for separatism in the history of other nations, the self-determination of the Northeastern people, and the economic and political favoritism combined with the concentration of income in the South and Southeast regions of Brazil. In addition, it is argued that the independence of the Northeast would promote faster development in its states.

In an interview with UOL, Ribemboim stated that the Northeast suffers from "internal neocolonialism", in which the states of the Southeast have greater economic power that privileges them over those of the Northeast, taking away natural resources and labor. For this reason, he believes that independence would be the best solution.

== See also ==
- The South Is My Country
- List of active separatist movements
- List of active separatist movements in South America
