= Peace for Animals =

Political party in the Netherlands

Peace for Animals Vrede voor Dieren
- Abbreviation: VvD
- Leader: Pascale Plusquin
- Founders: Pascale Plusquin; Annemarie van Gelder; Jurgen Suurmeijer
- Founded: 24 July 2025
- Split from: Party for the Animals
- Ideology: Animal rights; Pacifism
- Political position: Left-wing
- Colours: Blue-grey
- Senate: 0 / 75
- House of Representatives: 0 / 150
- European Parliament: 0 / 31
- Municipal councils: 3 / 8,512

Website
- vredevoordieren.nl

Peace for Animals (Dutch: Vrede voor Dieren, VvD) is a political party in the Netherlands. Founded on 24 July 2025, it split from the Party for the Animals over dissatisfaction with the party stance on military expenditure. The party is led by former provincial councillor Pascale Plusquin, and it participated in the 2025 general election without securing any seats.

== History ==
Peace for Animals emerged from internal dissatisfaction within the Party for the Animals (PvdD) over its defence policy. At a party congress in June 2025, a majority of PvdD members voted in favour of increased defence spending and support for the European rearmament program ReArm Europe. This led to a split within the party, after which Peace for Animals was founded under the leadership of Pascale Plusquin.

On 1 September 2025, three municipal council members joined the new party: two from Rotterdam, who had previously resigned their PvdD membership due to disagreement with the party's new direction, and one from Rheden. The party contested the 2025 general election in all twenty electoral districts, but its 0.16% of the vote was insufficient to secure a seat in the House of Representatives.

== Electoral results ==
=== House of Representatives ===
| Election | Lead candidate | List | Votes | % | Seats | +/– | Government |
|---|---|---|---|---|---|---|---|
| 2025 | Pascale Plusquin | List | 16,819 | 0.16 | 0 / 150 | New | Extra-parliamentary |
