= Esmah Lahlah =

Dutch politician (born 1979)

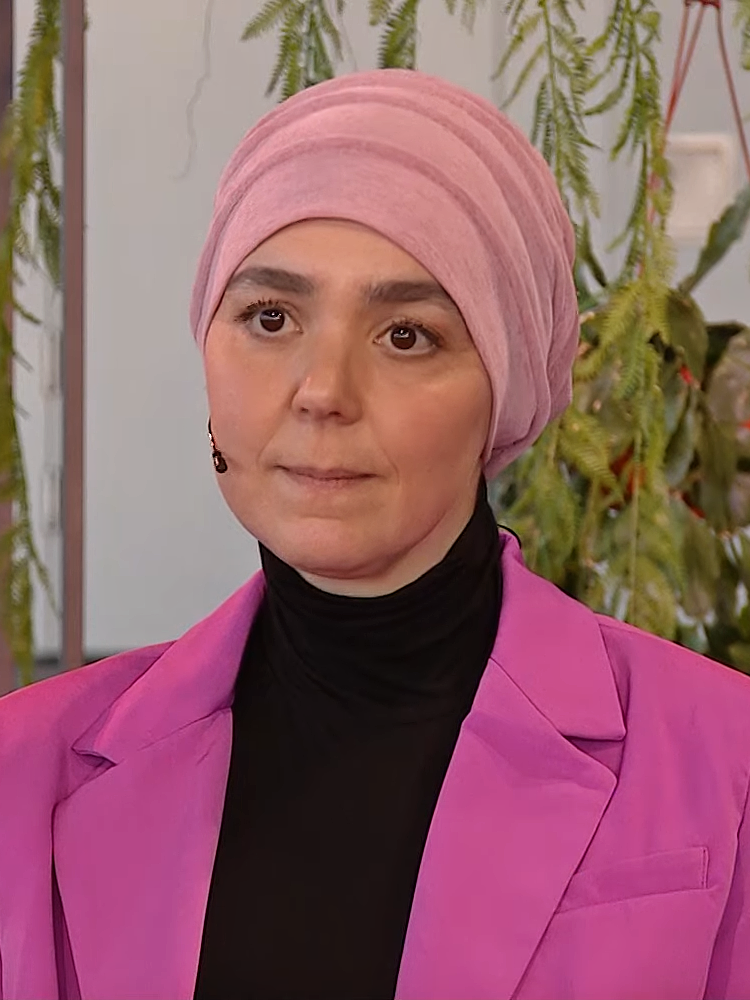
- Lahlah in 2022

Member of the House of Representatives
- Incumbent
- Assumed office 6 December 2023
- Parliamentary group: GroenLinks–PvdA

Alderwoman in Tilburg
- In office 2 June 2018 – 30 November 2023

Personal details
- Born: Asmah Lahlah; 13 October 1979 (age 47) Helmond, Netherlands
- Citizenship: Netherlands
- Party: GroenLinks (2022–2026); PRO (since 2026)
- Other political affiliations: Independent (until 2022); Labour (2023-2026)
- Education: Tilburg University

Asmah "Esmah" Lahlah (born 13 October 1979) is a Dutch politician of Progressief Nederland (PRO).

== Early and personal life ==
Lahlah was born to a Dutch mother and Moroccan father. Her father moved to the Netherlands in 1970, following his father. Lahlah has two sisters, and she was raised Muslim. She went to a Christian school and attended Arabic lessons. Lahlah has worn a hijab since around the age of eight or nine.

== Career ==
Lahlah has worked as a university lecturer. On 18 June 2018, she was appointed as party-independent alderwoman of employment, income, and poverty policy in Tilburg. In 2022, she joined GroenLinks and became lead candidate for the party in Tilburg in the 2022 municipal elections. She was elected to the municipal council, but she left to become an alderwoman once again. She also joined the Labour Party (PvdA) in 2023, when the party planned to merge into GroenLinks–PvdA. She served as alderwoman in Tilburg until 1 December 2023, when she was placed second on the party list of GroenLinks-PvdA in the March 2023 general election.

Lahlah was elected to the House of Representatives, and she became her party's spokesperson for justice and security. She is working on a bill to enshrine the right to subsistence in law. She also proposed to further regulate the debt collection industry to reduce predatory practices, through prohibiting the resale of debt and setting a limit to collection costs that could be charged.

Following November 2024 Amsterdam riots targeting supporters of the Israeli football club Maccabi Tel Aviv F.C., Prime Minister Dick Schoof blamed a specific group of young people with a migration background for the attacks, and he said that the events pointed to a broader integration issue. Integration state secretary Jurgen Nobel stated that a significant portion of Islamic youth did not endorse Dutch norms and values. Lahlah criticised the cabinet's response, arguing that its statements were unsubstantiated and that making generalisations about population groups caused fear among minorities. In response to discussions about integration, she said that people with a migration background should be enabled to participate in society. According to Lahlah, proposals to revoke Dutch nationality for dual citizens prosecuted for antisemitism would reduce dual citizens to second-class citizens.

In 2025 she applied for the mayoralty of Delft, but was not chosen. After the 2025 general election was called, she also unsuccessfully applied for the mayoralty of Tilburg. Despite the mayoral selection procedure being secret, both applications leaked. It led to controversy because she had only recently joined the House and was again a candidate for the 2025 election. During the controversy, parliamentary leader Jesse Klaver stated she would remain in parliament for the remainder of the term.

In June 2026 it was announced she would become alderman of Amsterdam.

=== House committee assignments ===
- Committee for Justice and Security
- Committee for Digital Affairs
- Procedure Committee
- Committee for Social Affairs and Employment
- Committee for Asylum and Migration

== Electoral history ==
Electoral history of Esmah Lahlah
Year	Body	Party	Pos.	Votes	Result		Ref.
Year	Body	Party	Pos.	Votes	Party seats	Individual	Ref.
2023	House of Representatives	GroenLinks–PvdA	2	217,787	25	Won	
2025	House of Representatives	GroenLinks–PvdA	2	113,381	20	Won	
