= The Other South =

The Other South L'Altro Sud
- President: Antonio Gentile
- Founded: 2008
- Headquarters: Corso Vittorio Emanuele 448, Naples
- Ideology: Regionalism
- European affiliation: European Free Alliance (until 2022)

Website
- http://www.laltrosud.it

The Other South (Italian: L'Altro Sud), whose full name The Other South – Democratic Union of the South (L'Altro Sud – Unione Democratica del Sud), is a regionalist political party in Southern Italy. The party has as its objectives the moral, economic and social renewal of the Southern Italy, to act as guarantor and guardian of the interests of southern citizens present in Italy and abroad and the defense of the cultural-historical identity of the southern regions.

The Other South was a member of the European Free Alliance.
