= Movement for the Independence of Sicily (2004) =

Movement for the Independence of Sicily Movimento per l'Indipendenza della Sicilia
- President: Salvatore Musumeci
- Secretary: Sebastiano Rapisarda
- Founded: 22 April 2004
- Headquarters: Via Giovanni Mangano, 17; Santa Venerina
- Ideology: Sicilian nationalism Regionalism; Localism; Populism

Party flag

Website
- www.mis1943.eu

The Movement for the Independence of Sicily (Movimento per l'Indipendenza della Sicilia, MIS) was a separatist cultural movement with the goal of obtaining the independence of Sicily from Italy. The organization was re-established in 2004 and identifies itself with the historical Movement for the Independence of Sicily founded by Andrea Finocchiaro Aprile in 1943.

MIS survived for a long time as a pressure group under the direction of Francesco Mazza Fasanaro.

== See also ==
- Sicilian nationalism
