= Moderates and Populars =

Moderates and Populars Moderati e Popolari
- President: Antonio Buccoliero
- Secretary: Nicola Canonico
- Founded: 2010
- Dissolved: c.2015
- Headquarters: Via Martiri d’Otranto 78/C, Bari
- Ideology: Regionalism
- Political position: Centre

Moderates and Populars (Italian: Moderati e Popolari, MeP) was a regionalist-centrist political party in Italy active in Apulia.

Soon after the 2010 regional election three disgruntled regional councillors coming from three different parties joined forces and launched their own party. These were Giacomo Olivieri (elected with Italy of Values), Nicola Canonico (Democratic Party) and Antonio Buccoliero (Apulians for Palese).

In January 2013 Olivieri resigned from the Regional Council and was replaced by Giacinto Forte (ex-Italy of Values, who joined the MeP), while in March the party was joined also by Antonio Martucci (ex-Italy of Values). At the national level both Olivieri and Forte were members of the Democratic Centre, a centrist party led by Bruno Tabacci, but this changed in March, when Olivieri left both parties and went on to launch Reality Italy.

In May 2013 the MeP chose to join the centre-right coalition, but this caused the exit of Buccoliero.
