= List of regional and minority parties in Europe =

This is a list of regional and minority parties in Europe.

Most of them are regionalist, some are autonomist or separatist, others represent minority interests. To be included in the list, parties need to gain at least 3.0% at the country-level or 3.0% in regional entities with at least 500,000 inhabitants or 6.0% in those with at least 100,000 inhabitants.

Country	Party	Region / constituency / goal	Electoral results	EU party
Austria	Team Carinthia	Carinthia	Carinthia 2023: 10.1%	none
Austria	Citizens' Forum Tyrol	Tyrol	Tyrol 2022: 9.9%	none
Belgium	New Flemish Alliance	Flanders	Belgium 2024: 16.7% Flanders 2024: 23.9%	EFA
Belgium	Flemish Interest	Flanders	Belgium 2024: 13.8% Flanders 2024: 22.7%	none
Belgium	Democratic Federalist Independent	Brussels	Brussels 2024: 8.1%	none
Bosnia and Herzegovina	Alliance of Independent Social Democrats	ethnic Serbs	Bosnia–Herzegovina 2026: 16.6% Republika Srpska 2026: 39.0%	none
Bosnia and Herzegovina	Serb Democratic Party	ethnic Serbs	Bosnia–Herzegovina 2026: 5.2% Republika Srpska 2026: 12.2%	none
Bosnia and Herzegovina	Party of Democratic Progress	ethnic Serbs	Bosnia–Herzegovina 2026: 6.0% Republika Srpska 2026: 14.1%	EPP†
Bosnia and Herzegovina	For Justice and Order	ethnic Serbs	Bosnia–Herzegovinaa 2026: 2.4% Republika Srpska 2026: 4.6%	none
Bosnia and Herzegovina	United Srpska	ethnic Serbs	Bosnia–Herzegovina 2026: 1.8% Republika Srpska 2026: 5.3%	none
Bosnia and Herzegovina	Socialist Party	ethnic Serbs	Bosnia–Herzegovina 2026: 1.9% Republika Srpska 2026: 5.5%	none
Bosnia and Herzegovina	Socialist Party of Srpska–Goran Selak	ethnic Serbs	Bosnia–Herzegovina 2026: 1.3% Republika Srpska 2026: 4.6%	none
Bosnia and Herzegovina	Democratic People's Alliance	ethnic Serbs	Bosnia–Herzegovina 2026: 2.1% Republika Srpska 2026: 5.6%	none
Bosnia and Herzegovina	Party of Democratic Action	ethnic Bosniaks	Bosnia–Herzegovina 2026: 19.9% BH Federation 2026: 30.6%	EPP†
Bosnia and Herzegovina	People and Justice	ethnic Bosniaks	Bosnia–Herzegovina 2026: 4.4% BH Federation 2026: 6.5%	none
Bosnia and Herzegovina	People's European Union of Bosnia and Herzegovina	ethnic Bosniaks	Bosnia–Herzegovina 2026: 2.5% BH Federation 2026: 4.2%	none
Bosnia and Herzegovina	Party for Bosnia and Herzegovina	ethnic Bosniaks	Bosnia–Herzegovina 2026: 5.3% BH Federation 2026: 9.0%	none
Bosnia and Herzegovina	Croatian Democratic Union of Bosnia and Herzegovina	ethnic Croats	Bosnia–Herzegovina 2026: 8.0% BH Federation 2026: 13.6%	EPP†
Bosnia and Herzegovina	Croatian Democratic Union 1990	ethnic Croats	Bosnia–Herzegovina 2026: 2.7% BH Federation 2026: 3.3%	none
Bulgaria	Movement for Rights and Freedoms	(Turkey) ethnic Turks	Bulgaria 2024: 11.2%	ALDE
Bulgaria	Alliance for Rights and Freedoms	(Turkey) ethnic Turks	Bulgaria 2024: 7.2%	none
Croatia	Istrian Democratic Assembly	Istria	Istria 2025: 30.4%	ALDE
Croatia	Croatian Democratic Alliance of Slavonia and Baranja	Slavonia, Baranja	Osijek-Baranja 2025: 6.4%	none
Croatia	Independent Democratic Serb Party	ethnic Serbs	Vukovar-Syrmia 2025: 9.2%	none
Finland	Swedish People's Party of Finland	(Sweden) ethnic Swedes	Finland 2023: 4.3% Vaasa 2023: 19.3%	ALDE
France	Our Land	Alsace	Grand Est 2021: 3.7%	EFA
France	EELV–Breton Democratic Union	Brittany	Brittany 2021: 14.8%	EFA
France	Let's Make Corsica	Corsica	Corsica 2021: 29.2%	EFA
France	Party of the Corsican Nation	Corsica	Corsica 2021: 13.2%	EFA
France	Renewal	Corsica	Corsica 2021: 8.4%	none
France	Free Corsica	Corsica	Corsica 2021: 6.9%	none
Germany	Christian Social Union in Bavaria	Bavaria	Germany 2025: 6.0% Bavaria 2023: 37.0%	EPP
Germany	Free Voters of Bavaria	Bavaria	Bavaria 2023: 15.8%	none
Germany	Free Voters of Hessen	Hesse	Hessen 2023: 3.5%	none
Germany	Free Voters of Rhineland-Palatinate	Rhineland-Palatinate	Rhineland-Palatinate 2026: 4.2%	none
Germany	South Schleswig Voters' Association	(Denmark) ethnic Danes, Frisians	Schleswig-Holstein 2022: 5.7%	EFA
Italy	Valdostan Union	Aosta Valley	Aosta Valley 2025: 32.0%	EFA
Italy	Autonomists of the Centre (SA–PlA–RV)	Aosta Valley	Aosta Valley 2025: 14.1%	none
Italy	Lega Vallée d'Aoste	Aosta Valley	Aosta Valley 2025: 8.4%	none
Italy	Future Aosta Valley	Aosta Valley	Aosta Valley 2025: 4.6%	none
Italy	South Tyrolean People's Party	South Tyrol	South Tyrol 2023: 34.5%	EPP†
Italy	Team K	South Tyrol	South Tyrol 2023: 11.1%	ALDE†
Italy	South Tyrolean Freedom	South Tyrol	South Tyrol 2023: 10.9%	EFA
Italy	Greens of South Tyrol	South Tyrol	South Tyrol 2023: 9.1%	EGP
Italy	JWA List	South Tyrol	South Tyrol 2023: 5.9%	none
Italy	Die Freiheitlichen	South Tyrol	South Tyrol 2023: 4.9%	none
Italy	For South Tyrol	South Tyrol	South Tyrol 2023: 3.4%	none
Italy	Lega Alto Adige Südtirol	South Tyrol	South Tyrol 2023: 3.0%	none
Italy	The Civic List	South Tyrol	South Tyrol 2023: 2.6%	none
Italy	Lega Trentino	Trentino	Trentino 2023: 23.8% (Note: Combined result of party list (13.1%) and Maurizio Fugatti's personal list (10.7%).)	none
Italy	Campobase	Trentino	Trentino 2023: 8.4%	none
Italy	Trentino Tyrolean Autonomist Party	Trentino	Trentino 2023: 8.2%	EPP†
Italy	The Civic List	Trentino	Trentino 2023: 4.8%	none
Italy	Autonomy House	Trentino	Trentino 2023: 4.8%	none
Italy	Lega Piemonte	Piedmont	Piedmont 2024: 9.4%	none
Italy	Lega Lombarda	Lombardy	Lombardy 2023: 22.7% (Note: Combined result of party list (16.5%) and Attilio Fontana's personal list (6.2%).)	none
Italy	Liga Veneta	Veneto	Veneto 2025: 36.3%	none
Italy	Resist Veneto	Veneto	Veneto 2025: 5.0%	none
Italy	Lega Friuli-Venezia Giulia	Friuli-Venezia Giulia	Friuli-Venezia Giulia 2023: 36.8% (Note: Combined result of party list (19.2%) and Massimiliano Fedriga's personal list (17.8%), including FVG Project.)	none
Italy	Pact for Autonomy	Friuli-Venezia Giulia	Friuli-Venezia Giulia 2023: 6.3%	none
Italy	Lega Emilia; Lega Romagna	Emilia; Romagna	Emilia-Romagna 2024: 5.3%	none none
Italy	Lega Liguria	Liguria	Liguria 2024: 8.5%	none
Italy	Lega Toscana	Tuscany	Tuscany 2025: 4.4%	none
Italy	Lega Marche	Marche	Marche 2025: 7.4%	none
Italy	Lega Umbria	Umbria	Umbria 2024: 12.7% (Note: Combined result of party list (7.7%) and Donatella Tesei's personal list (5.0%).)	none
Italy	Sardinian Reformers	Sardinia	Sardinia 2024: 7.1%	none
Italy	Sardinia in the Centre 2020	Sardinia	Sardinia 2024: 5.5%	none
Italy	Sardinian Action Party	Sardinia	Sardinia 2024: 5.4%	EFA
Italy	Sardinia Alliance	Sardinia	Sardinia 2024: 4.1%	none
Italy	Lega Sardegna	Sardinia	Sardinia 2024: 3.8%	none
Italy	Sardinia Project	Sardinia	Sardinia 2024: 3.5%	none
Italy	Shared Horizon	Sardinia	Sardinia 2024: 3.0%	none
Italy	Progressive Party	Sardinia	Sardinia 2024: 3.0%	none
Italy	Future Left	Sardinia	Sardinia 2024: 3.0%	none
Italy	South calls North	Sicily	Sicily 2022: 13.6%	none
Italy	Popular Construction–Movement for Autonomy	Sicily	Sicily 2022: 6.8%	none
Latvia	Sovereign Power (incl. LKS)	(Russia) ethnic Russians	Latvia 2026: 11.9%	none
Lithuania	Electoral Action of Poles in Lithuania	(Poland) ethic Poles	Lithuania 2024: 4.0%	ECRP
Montenegro	For the Future of Montenegro (incl. NSD, DNP, RP)	ethnic Serbs	Montenegro 2023: 14.8%	none
Montenegro	Bosniak Party	ethnic Bosniaks	Montenegro 2023: 7.1%	none
Montenegro	Socialist People's Party of Montenegro–Demos	ethnic Serbs	Montenegro 2023: 3.1%	none
Netherlands	Frisian National Party	Friesland, Frisians	Friesland 2023: 8.1%	EFA
Netherlands	Groninger Interest	Groningen	Groningen 2023: 6.0%	none
Netherlands	Party for the North	Groningen	Groningen 2023: 2.9%	none
Netherlands	Local Limburg	(Limburg (Netherlands)) Limburg	Limburg 2023: 4.3%	none
Netherlands	Local Brabant	North Brabant	North Brabant 2023: 4.2%	none
Netherlands	Party for Zeeland	Zeeland	Zeeland 2023: 4.6%	none
North Macedonia	European Front	(Albania) ethnic Albanians	North Macedonia 2024: 14.1%	none
North Macedonia	VLEN Coalition	(Albania) ethnic Albanians	North Macedonia 2024: 10.9%	none
Poland	Nonpartisan Local Government Activists	(Poland) Regionalism (Lower Silesian Voivodeship) Lower Silesia	Poland 2024: 3.0% Lower Silesia 2024: 10.6% Pomerania 2024: 3.1% Greater Poland 2024: 3.0%	none
Poland	All-Poland Local Government Coalition	(Poland) Regionalism	West Pomerania 2024: 8.4% Greater Poland 2024: 4.3%	none
Poland	German Minority Electoral Committee	Silesia, (Germany) ethnic Germans	Opole 2024: 16.2%	none
Poland	Silesian Regional Party	Silesia, (Germany) ethnic Germans	Silesia 2024: 3.2%	EFA
Poland	Self-governed Pomerania	(Pomeranian Voivodeship) Pomerania	Pomerania 2024: 3.8%	none
Portugal	Together for the People	Madeira	Madeira 2025: 21.1%	EDP
Romania	Democratic Alliance of Hungarians in Romania	(Hungary) ethnic Hungarians	Romania 2024: 6.3% Harghita 2024: 74.7%	EPP
Romania	Hungarian Alliance of Transylvania	(Hungary) ethnic Hungarians	Harghita 2024: 7.3%	EFA
Romania	Democratic Forum of Germans in Romania	(Germany) ethnic Germans	Sibiu 2024: 13.2%	none
Serbia	Alliance of Vojvodina Hungarians	(Hungary) ethnic Hungarians	Vojvodina 2023: 6.7%	EPP†
Slovakia	Hungarian Alliance	(Hungary) ethnic Hungarians	Slovakia 2023: 4.4% Trnava 2026: 20.9%	EPP
Spain	Aragonese Union	Aragon	Aragon 2026: 9.7%	EFA
Spain	Existe Coalition	Aragon	Aragon 2026: 3.5%	none
Spain	Asturias Forum	Asturias	Asturias 2023: 3.7%	none
Spain	More for Majorca (incl. PSM)	Balearic Islands, Catalan Countries	Balearic Islands 2023: 8.4%	EFA
Spain	Proposal for the Islands	Balearic Islands, Catalan Countries	Balearic Islands 2023: 3.8%	none
Spain	Basque Nationalist Party	(Basque Country (autonomous community)) Basque Country	Basque Country 2024: 35.2%	EDP
Spain	EH Bildu (incl. Sortu, EA, Alternatiba)	(Basque Country (autonomous community)) Basque Country	Basque Country 2024: 32.5%	EFA
Spain	Navarrese People's Union	Navarre	Navarre 2023: 27.9%	EFA
Spain	EH Bildu (incl. Sortu, EA, Alternatiba)	(Basque Country (autonomous community)) Basque Country	Navarre 2023: 17.3%	EFA
Spain	Yes to the Future (incl. PNV)	(Basque Country (autonomous community)) Basque Country	Navarre 2023: 13.3%	EDP
Spain	Canarian Coalition	Canary Islands	Canary Islands 2023: 21.8%	none
Spain	New Canaries	Canary Islands	Canary Islands 2023: 8.1%	EFA†
Spain	Regionalist Party of Cantabria	Cantabria	Cantabria 2023: 20.9%	none
Spain	Leonese People's Union	Castile and León	Castile and León 2026: 4.4%	none
Spain	Together for Catalonia	Catalonia, Catalan Countries	Catalonia 2024: 21.6%	none
Spain	Republican Left of Catalonia	Catalonia, Catalan Countries	Catalonia 2024: 13.7%	EFA
Spain	Comuns Sumar (incl. EV)	Catalonia, Catalan Countries	Catalonia 2024: 5.8%	EGP (EV)
Spain	Popular Unity Candidacy	Catalonia, Catalan Countries	Catalonia 2024: 4.1%	none
Spain	Galician Nationalist Bloc	Galicia	Galicia 2024: 31.6%	EFA
Spain	More Madrid	(Community of Madrid) Madrid	Madrid 2023: 18.4%	none
Spain	Riojan Party	La Rioja	La Rioja 2023: 3.6%	none
Spain	Commitment Coalition (incl. BNV)	(Valencian Community) Valencian Country, Catalan Countries	Valencian Community 2023: 14.5%	EFA
Switzerland	Geneva Citizens' Movement	(Canton of Geneva) Geneva	Geneva 2023: 11.1%	none
Switzerland	Ticino League	Ticino	Ticino 2023: 22.9%	none
Turkey	Peoples' Equality and Democracy Party	ethnic Kurds	Turkey 2023: 8.9%	PES†
Ukraine	Kernes Bloc — Successful Kharkiv	Kharkiv Oblast	Kharkiv 2020: 38.3%	none
Ukraine	All-Ukrainian Union "Cherkashchany"	Cherkasy Oblast	Cherkasy 2020: 21.4%	none
Ukraine	Native Zakarpattia	Zakarpattia Oblast	Zakarpattia 2020: 17.8%	none
Ukraine	Party of Hungarians of Ukraine	(Hungary) ethnic Hungarians	Zakarpattia 2020: 11.6%	none
Ukraine	Ukrainian Galician Party	(Kingdom of Galicia and Lodomeria) Galicia	Lviv 2020: 5.7% Ternopil 2020: 4.4%	none
Ukraine	Soyuz	(Russia) ethnic Russians	Crimea 2010: 5.3%	none
United Kingdom	Scottish National Party	Scotland	Scotland 2026: 27.2%	EFA
United Kingdom	Scottish Green Party	Scotland	Scotland 2026: 14.0%	EGP
United Kingdom	Plaid Cymru	Wales	Wales 2026: 35.4%	EFA
United Kingdom	Wales Green Party	Wales	Wales 2026: 6.7%	EGP
United Kingdom	Sinn Féin	United Ireland	Northern Ireland 2022: 29.0%	none
United Kingdom	Democratic Unionist Party	Northern Ireland, Ulster unionism	Northern Ireland 2022: 21.3%	none
United Kingdom	Alliance Party of Northern Ireland	Northern Ireland	Northern Ireland 2022: 13.5%	ALDE
United Kingdom	Ulster Unionist Party	Northern Ireland, Ulster unionism	Northern Ireland 2022: 11.2%	ECRP
United Kingdom	Social Democratic and Labour Party	United Ireland	Northern Ireland 2022: 9.1%	PES
United Kingdom	Traditional Unionist Voice	Northern Ireland, Ulster unionism	Northern Ireland 2022: 7.6%	none
United Kingdom	Mebyon Kernow	Cornwall	Cornwall 2025: 4.0%	EFA

== Notes ==
† = Observer or associate member.

== Sources ==
- European Election Database
- Election Resources on the Internet
- Psephos – Adam Carr's Election Archive
- Parties and elections in Europe, by Wolfram Nordsieck
- Belgium: Department of Elections – Ministry of the Interior
- Croatia: State Electoral Commission
- France: Elections – Ministry of the Interior
- Germany: Elections in Germany, Election.de
- Italy: Historical Archive of Elections – Ministry of the Interior
- Netherlands: Election Results Database
- Romania: 2020 Local Elections – Central Electoral Bureau
- Spain: Elections – Ministry of the Interior
- Ukraine: 2020 Zakarpattia Oblast election – Central Electoral Commission
