= Aant Jelle Soepboer =

Dutch politician (born 1989)

Member of the House of Representatives
- In office 6 December 2023 – 25 July 2025

Alderman of Noardeast-Fryslân
- In office 19 May 2022 – 18 October 2023
- Succeeded by: Hanneke Jouta

Municipal councillor of Noardeast-Fryslân
- In office 1 January 2019 – 19 May 2022

Personal details
- Born: 17 August 1989 (age 36) Dokkum, Netherlands
- Party: FNP (2017–present)
- Other political affiliations: NSC (2023–2025)
- Children: 1
- Education: NHL Leeuwarden (BEd)
- Occupation: Politician; civil servant; writer

Aant Jelle Soepboer is a Dutch politician, writer, and former civil servant. He was a member of the House of Representatives for NSC between 6 December 2023 and 25 July 2025. Earlier, he was municipal councillor and alderman of the Frisian municipality Noardeast-Fryslân, representing the Frisian National Party (FNP). He is committed to the emancipation of the Frisian language.

== Early life and teaching career ==
Soepboer was born in 1989 in Dokkum, where he also grew up. Soepboer completed the teacher training course in history and geography at NHL Leeuwarden from 2006 to 2011. During his final year of study in September 2010, he became a history and geography teacher for the Liudger Christian School Community in Burgum where he worked until August 2020. He co-wrote a series of history books targeted at young people called Vet oud (Super old).

== Political career ==
=== Noardeast-Fryslân ===
When the Municipality of Noardeast-Fryslân considered banning a parade out of safety concerns, Soepboer wrote a letter about the importance of local traditions. He subsequently decided to become a member of the FNP at the end of 2017, just before the 2018 municipal elections, in which he participated as 16th on the electoral list. Through a campaign in which quality of life in the countryside and upholding traditions, such as supporting the continued use of flat carts in parades (as a result of which many young people voted for him), played an important role, he managed to get into the municipal council of Noardeast-Fryslân with preferential votes.

In the four years that he has been a councillor, Soepboer gained prominence by writing articles in regional and national newspapers about issues such as the housing shortage, building for young people with a socio-economic connection to the area, traditions such as carbide shooting and floats and combating shrinkage. He has also appeared on TV several times, for example in De Hofkar with Rutger Castricum and with Arjen Lubach.

In the 2022 municipal elections, Soepboer became party leader and achieved a victory with the FNP faction in the municipality of Noardeast-Fryslân, making the party the largest party in the municipal council with 8 of the 29 seats. Together with Sociaal in Noardeast (S!N) and Gemeentebelangen Noardeast-Fryslân, the FNP formed the coalition and concluded a "local agreement with the Mienskip" (Mienskip meaning 'community'). Soepboer took office as alderman for the FNP together with Bert Koonstra. His portfolio included "mienskip", culture, public space management, and the environment. The Frisian language was also part of his portfolio and he took part in the Provinciaal Bestuurlijk overleg Frysk ('Provincial Administrative consultation Frisian'). On 19 October 2023, Soepboer left his office as alderman to be active in national politics, and he was succeeded by Hanneke Jouta.

=== House of Representatives ===
Soepboer joined New Social Contract (NSC), which was founded by Pieter Omtzigt in the run-up to the November 2023 general election. They had met during a working visit of Omtzigt to the province. Soepboer was the party's seventh candidate in the election, in which NSC secured 20 seats. He was sworn in as a member of parliament on 6 December 2023. He serves as the party's spokesperson for primary, secondary, and vocational education and for water. When NSC agreed to discontinue temporary education subsidies as part of the Schoof cabinet's coalition agreement, Soepboer defended the decision saying targeted structural financing is a better way to solve education issues. He called for a comprehensive plan to restore the quality of education.

==== Committee assignments ====
- Committee for Education, Culture and Science
- Credentials committee
- Contact group United Kingdom
- Committee for Infrastructure and Water Management

== Personal life ==
Soepboer is the drummer of the Frisian folk metal band Baldrs Draumar, a band with a focus of Friesland and Norse mythology. As of 2024, he had a wife and a son.

== Electoral history ==
Electoral history of Aant Jelle Soepboer
Year	Body	Party	Pos.	Votes	Result		Ref.
Year	Body	Party	Pos.	Votes	Party seats	Individual	Ref.
2023	House of Representatives	New Social Contract	7	10,161	20	Won	
2025	House of Representatives	Frisian National Party	1	6,279	0	Lost	
