= Hanneke Steen =

Dutch politician (born 1983)

Member of the House of Representatives
- Incumbent
- Assumed office 12 November 2025

Personal details
- Born: 29 March 1983 (age 43)
- Party: Christian Democratic Appeal

Hanneke Susan Steen (born 29 March 1983 in Hengelo) is a Dutch politician for the Christian Democratic Appeal (CDA). Since 12 November 2025, she has been a member of the House of Representatives. From 2022 to 2025, she served as an alderman in Hengelo, and before that, she was a councilor in the same municipality since 2014.

== Youth and early career ==
Steen was born and raised in Hengelo. She studied clarinet for two years at the ArtEZ University of the Arts in Arnhem. Afterward, she studied law and legal administrative sciences at the University of Groningen. She interned at the Scientific Institute for the CDA.

Steen began her career as a lawyer at a water board. She worked for seven years at Rijkswaterstaat. On 1 June 2020, Steen became the director of the National Signposting Service.

== Local politics ==
After the 2014 municipal elections, Steen became a municipal councilor in Hengelo in April 2014. In 2018, she became the leader of the CDA in the council.

In May 2022, Steen became an alderman in Hengelo, responsible for finance, mobility, talent, and citizen participation. In this role, she became regionally responsible for the accessibility of Twente. In early October 2025, she resigned as alderman to focus on the campaign for the general elections.

== Member of the House of Representatives ==
For the 2023 Dutch general election, Steen was ninth on the CDA candidate list and contributed to the election manifesto. Due to an electoral defeat for the party, she was not elected. For the 2025 Dutch general election, she again contributed to the party manifesto and was second on the candidate list. She was sworn in on 12 November 2025.

== Personal life ==
Steen is married and has no children. She is a member of the Protestant Church in the Netherlands.
