= Auke van der Goot =

Dutch politician (born 1952)

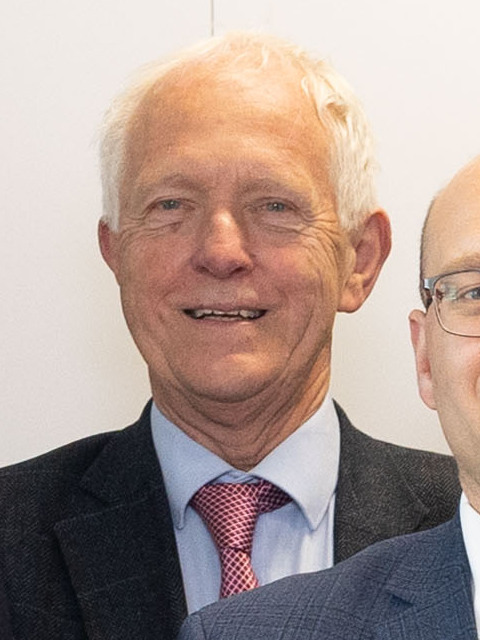
- Van der Goot in 2025

Member of the Senate
- Incumbent
- Assumed office 13 June 2023
- Parliamentary group: Independent Politics Netherlands

Personal details
- Born: Auke Sjerp van der Goot; 29 January 1952 (age 74) Huizum, Netherlands
- Party: Frisian National Party
- Education: University of Groningen

Auke Sjerp van der Goot (pronounced [ˈʌukə ˈɕɛr(ə)p fɑn dər ˈɣoːt]; born 29 January 1952) is a Dutch retired civil servant and politician of the Frisian National Party (FNP). Since 2023, he has served as a member of the Senate on behalf of Independent Politics Netherlands (OPNL), an alliance of regional political parties.

== Biography ==
Van der Goot was born in Huizum, a neighbourhood of Leeuwarden, Friesland, and attended the Christian Gymnasium there. He subsequently studied history and economics at the University of Groningen.

In 1982, Van der Goot worked on the European dimension of the Frisian language and cultural policy for the province of Friesland. Between 1993 and 1998, he worked as a researcher at the Fryske Akademy in Leeuwarden, where he conducted research into bilingual and trilingual education. He worked as a policy advisor at the Ministry of the Interior from 1999 to 2022.

In May 2023, Van der Goot participated in the 2023 Senate election as OPNL's lead candidate. He has been a member of the Senate on behalf of OPNL since 13 June 2023.
