= Lorena López de Lacalle Arizti =

Basque politician

President of the European Free Alliance
- Incumbent
- Assumed office March 2019

Personal details
- Born: Lorena López de Lacalle Arizti; 16 August 1959 (age 66) Vitoria-Gasteiz, Basque Country
- Party: Eusko Alkartasuna
- Occupation: Politician, interpreter, professor

Lorena López de Lacalle Arizti (born in Vitoria-Gasteiz on 16 August 1959) is a Basque politician, president of the European Free Alliance since 2019.

== Biography ==
She was a professor of translation and interpretation at the University of Geneva, the University of Strasbourg and the University of the Basque Country. He has worked as an interpreter in the European Parliament, the European Commission and the Council of Europe for 25 years. He has been a member of the Eusko Alkartasuna party since 2005 and a member of the Eusko Alkartasuna National Assembly since 2009.

From August 2007 to 2010, she was a member of the Provincial Council of Álava for Culture, Euskera and Sports. As a deputy, she was a member of the foundation of the Cathedral of Santa María de Vitoria, a member of the board of the Artium Museum and president of the foundation of the School of Arts and Crafts of Vitoria-Gasteiz. She was the first president of the Añana Valle Salado Foundation. While she was a deputy, the discoveries of oysters from Iruña-Veleia took place. Although initially the findings were not confirmed, the archaeologist who sued López de Lacalle in 2009 found evidence of counterfeiting of the pieces.

In 2011, she was appointed Secretary of International Solidarity and Development Support of Eusko Alkartasuna (EA), as well as a member of the committee of the European Free Alliance. In the 2011 and 2015 provincial and municipal elections, she was elected a member of the General Assembly of Álava, replacing the former Bildu coalition and later the EH Bildu coalition. From 2012 to 2019 she was vice-president of Eurobasque, the Basque council of the European Movement.

She has been Vice President of the European Free Alliance since May 2011 and has chaired the European Party since March 2019. She was EA's second representative after Carlos Garaikoetxea held the presidency of the Alliance in the 1990s.

She has collaborated in various NGOs on development cooperation and reception of migrants. She speaks French, English, Italian, Portuguese, Spanish, and Basque.
