= The Frisians =

The Frisians Die Friesen / Do Fräisen / De Freesen
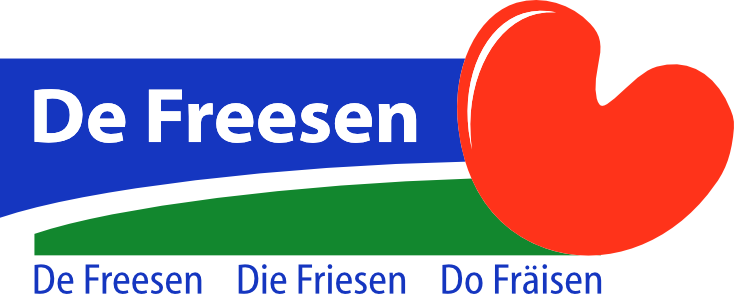
- Leader: Ralf Bieneck
- Founded: 2007; 19 years ago
- Dissolved: 7 May 2023; 2 years ago
- Headquarters: Leer, Lower Saxony, Germany
- Ideology: Frisian minority interests
- European affiliation: European Free Alliance
- Colours: Black, red, blue

Website
- www.die-friesen.eu

The Frisians (German: Die Friesen, Saterland Frisian: Do Fräisen, Low German: De Freesen) was a regionalist political party in the state of Lower Saxony in Germany, seeking to promote the interests of the Frisian minority ethnic group in Germany.

The party sought self-determination. Their political policies included the introduction of Low German as a compulsory subject in schools.

Die Friesen was a member of the European Free Alliance until 2018.

== See also ==
- East Frisia
- East Frisian Low Saxon
- East Frisians
- Frisia
- Frisians
- Frisian languages
