= Catalan Unity =

Catalan regionalist party based in Southern France

Catalan Unity Unitat Catalana
- European affiliation: European Free Alliance
- National Assembly: 0 / 577
- Senate: 0 / 348
- European Parliament: 0 / 81

Catalan Unity (Catalan: Unitat Catalana, IPA: [uniˈtat kətəˈlanə]) is a regionalist party based in southern France. It claims to represent the Catalan minority of what it calls "Northern Catalonia".

The party advocates for making "Northern Catalonia" into an autonomous region in France.
