= 2022 Antioquia protests =

In June 2022, following Gustavo Petro's election as President of Colombia, a vocal group of protesters in Medellín, the capital of Antioquia, took to the streets to reject the election results. Antioquia, known for its conservative leanings and strong support for former President Álvaro Uribe, witnessed significant unrest among residents who opposed Petro, a progressive candidate.

== Background ==
Organized by rightwing groups aligned with Uribismo, the protest in Medellín became a platform for expressing dissatisfaction with the national election outcome. The demonstrators, dressed in the colors of the Antioquia flag and marched through the city's streets, chanting slogans like "Antioquia deserves to be sovereign." The protest's leader rallied the crowd by denouncing centralism and asserting that Bogotá should not have control over Antioquia's destiny. This call for Antioquia's independence was not an isolated incident; it echoed a similar movement from 1992 when an advertising campaign in major Colombian newspapers advocated for the region's independence.
