= Provincial Council of Friesland =

Provincial council in Friesland, Netherlands

The Provincial Council of Friesland (Dutch: Provinciale Staten van Friesland, West Frisian: Provinsjale Steaten fan Fryslân) is the provincial council for the Dutch province of Friesland, first introduced under the Constitution of the Netherlands in 1814. It forms the legislative body of the province. Its 43 seats are distributed every four years in provincial elections.

== Current composition ==
Since the 2023 provincial elections, the distribution of seats of the Provincial Council of Friesland has been as follows:

Party	Votes	%	+/–	Seats	+/–
Farmer–Citizen Movement	94,458	27.86	New	14	New
Labour Party	36,023	10.62	–2.78	5	–1
Christian Democratic Appeal	29,669	8.75	–7.92	4	–4
Frisian National Party	27,298	8.05	+0.12	4	0
People's Party for Freedom and Democracy	22,843	6.74	–2.67	3	–1
GroenLinks	22,181	6.54	–1.15	3	0
Christian Union	17,883	5.27	–1.33	2	–1
Party for Freedom	15,102	4.45	–1.35	2	–1
Forum for Democracy	12,366	3.65	–9.78	1	–5
Socialist Party	11,724	3.46	–1.71	1	–1
Party for the Animals	11,402	3.36	+0.14	1	0
Democrats 66	11,237	3.31	–0.81	1	–1
JA21	9,096	2.68	New	1	New
Provincial Interests Frisia	6,891	2.03	+0.24	1	+1
BVNL	6,033	1.78	New	0	New
50PLUS	2,903	0.86	–1.69	0	–1
General Water Board Party	1,971	0.58	New	0	New
Total	339,080	100.00	–	43	–
Valid votes	339,080	99.54			
Invalid votes	730	0.21			
Blank votes	844	0.25			
Total votes	340,654	100.00			
Registered voters/turnout	519,118	65.62	+6.50		
Source: Kiesraad

== See also ==
- States of Friesland
- Provincial politics in the Netherlands
