= The South Is My Country =

Separatist movement

- O Sul é o Meu País
- Formation: 1992; 34 years ago
- Type: NGO
- Legal status: Active
- Purpose: Conduct studies on the possibility of political and administrative emancipation for South Brazil
- Headquarters: Curitiba, Paraná, Brazil
- Official language: Portuguese
- Website: osuleomeupais.org

The South Is My Country (Portuguese: O Sul é o Meu País) is a separatist movement that seeks the independence of Brazil's South Region, formed by the states of Paraná, Rio Grande do Sul, and Santa Catarina. The group claims the region is under-represented by Brasília.

== Context ==
Claimed territory.

During the Empire of Brazil, several separatist movements existed in the region. Among the main reasons for secession, the groups complained about high taxation of dry meat, the main export product of the region during the time. Armed conflict broke out in the Ragamuffin War, when Rio Grande do Sul unsuccessfully tried to gain independence. During the transition to the republic, federalist groups formed in the region, culminating in the Federalist Revolution.

In the context of the Brazilian República Velha (Old Republic), the so-called coffee with milk politics were in practice, favoring the states of São Paulo and Minas Gerais, the largest in terms of population and wealth - producers of coffee and dairy products, respectively. Rio Grande do Sul, among other states, joined the political opposition, forming the Liberal Alliance (Portuguese: Aliança Liberal) and launched Getúlio Vargas as candidate for president, who lost to Júlio Prestes. Vargas had almost 100% of the votes in Rio Grande do Sul. The Liberal Alliance refused to accept the results of the election, claiming that Prestes' victory was fraudulent. This led to a coup d'état known as Revolution of 1930, which made Getulio Vargas the new president, ending the Old Republic. After this, only two presidents linked to the states Paraná, Rio Grande do Sul, and Santa Catarina came to power democratically: Getúlio Vargas and João Goulart. Both presidents lost their mandates.

== Movement ==
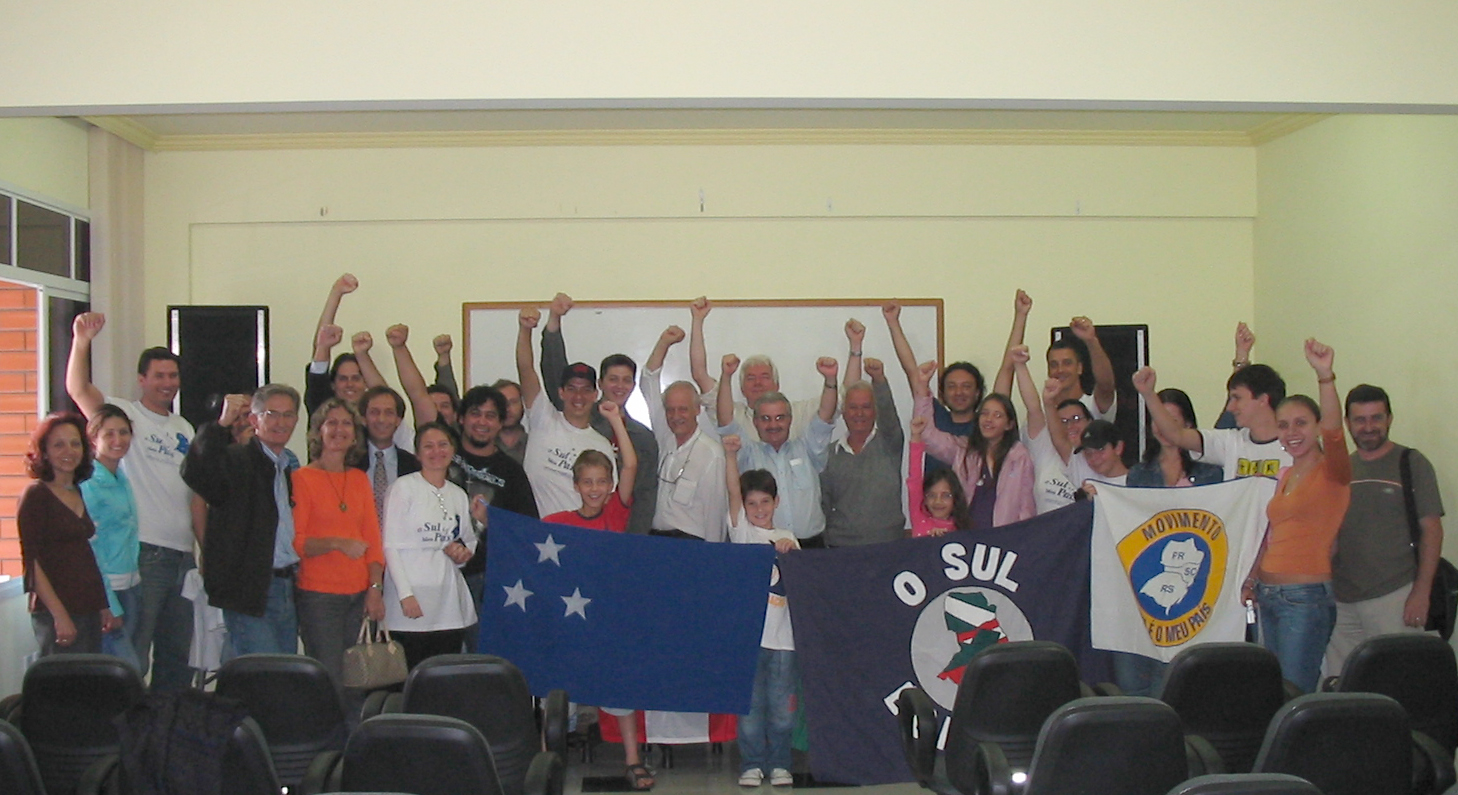
Training course for leaders in Brusque, SC.

The movement arose during the Second Separatist Congress celebrated in 1992 at Laguna, founded by Adílcio Cadorin, former mayor of the city. It upholds the concept of self-determination of the peoples and does not constitute a political party, despite its founders being directly involved with politics. The movement is headquartered in Curitiba and the president is Celso Deucher.

Its defenders allege that the states of Paraná, Rio Grande do Sul, and Santa Catarina, which forms part of the Southern Cone, have particular and distinct characteristics from the rest of Brazil, and thus they claim the right to political, economic, social and cultural self-determination, based on the expectation of self-sufficiency to direct better the resources of the state to attend to its regional peculiarities.

The official symbols of the movement includes three stars which represent Paraná, Rio Grande do Sul, and Santa Catarina.

=== Unofficial independence referendums ===
==== First edition ====
On 1 October 2016, Plebisul - an unofficial referendum - was held. Voters were asked if they wanted to secede from Brazil, forming a new country with the three states. A total of 616,917 votes (which represents less than 3% the number of registered voters in these states) were counted according to the organizers of the ballot, 95% voting yes. They were hoping to reach up to a million votes throughout the three Brazilian states.

Results and participation
State	YES votes	%	NO votes	%	Participation (absolute)	Registered voters	Participation (relative)
Paraná	21,361	88.82	2,690	11.18	24,051	7,869,450	0.31
Rio Grande do Sul	311,356	97.21	8,924	2.79	320,280	8,362,830	3.83
Santa Catarina	257,947	94.63	14,639	5.37	272,586	4,985,048	5.47
Total	590,664	95.74	26,253	4.26	616,917	21,217,328	2.91

Results and participation in the largest cities
City	YES votes	%	NO votes	%	Participation (absolute)	Registered voters	Participation (relative)
Curitiba	4,702	89.84	532	10.16	5,234	1,289,215	0.41
Porto Alegre	5,859	92.30	489	7.70	6,348	1,098,515	0.58
Joinville	12,398	92.94	942	7.06	13,340	372,551	3.58
Londrina	1,087	75.07	361	24.93	1,448	353,314	0.41
Caxias do Sul	8,654	96.05	356	3.95	9,010	293,417	3.07
Florianópolis	2,381	85.93	390	14.07	2,771	316,261	0.88
Maringá	374	84.81	67	15.19	441	261,717	0.17
Pelotas	3,113	93.60	213	6.40	3,326	228,634	1.45
Canoas	1,350	96.98	42	3.02	1,392	247,770	0.56
Ponta Grossa	1,163	83.07	237	16.93	1,400	222,716	0.63
Blumenau	16,800	94.06	1,061	5.94	17,861	230,167	7.76
Cascavel	357	77.11	106	22.89	463	206,714	0.22
São José dos Pinhais	1,264	85.93	207	14.07	1,471	170,706	0.86
Santa Maria	798	88.57	103	11.43	901	203,043	0.44
Gravataí	1,063	99.25	8	0.75	1,071	186,699	0.57
Foz do Iguaçu	-	-	-	-	0	165,730	0.00
Viamão	1,075	99.44	6	0.56	1,081	134,827	0.80
Novo Hamburgo	4,692	95.97	197	4.03	4,889	178,138	2.74
Colombo	-	-	-	-	0	128,602	0.00
São José	1,462	92.12	125	7.88	1,587	156,617	1.01
São Leopoldo	4,429	89.03	546	10.97	4,975	164,141	3.03
Chapecó	7,193	92.32	598	7.68	7,791	140,526	5.54
Criciúma	1,442	96.13	58	3.87	1,500	141,667	1.06
Itajaí	3,993	93.69	269	6.31	4,262	143,131	2.98
Rio Grande	519	94.71	29	5.29	548	154,595	0.35
Alvorada	1,429	93.22	104	6.78	1,533	119,228	1.29
Passo Fundo	5,143	95.22	258	4.78	5,401	142,329	3.79

==== Second edition ====
In 2017, a second edition of the referendum was announced, to be held on 7 October of the same year. The edition had an estimated cost of R$ 25,000. The participation target was set to the same as the previous referendum - 1 million voters.

In its second edition, the organizers also collected signatures for a popular initiative bill to hold an official referendum in 2018, with the same question and answer options as the informal popular referendum held so far.

Results and participation
State	YES votes	%	NO votes	%	Participation (absolute)	Registered voters	Participation (relative)	Variation (relative)
Paraná	73,332	94.08	4,615	5.92	77,947	7,869,450	0.99	+ 224.09
Rio Grande do Sul	180,329	97.16	5,263	2.84	185,592	8,362,830	2.22	42.05
Santa Catarina	96,972	96.28	3,745	3.72	100,717	4,985,048	2.02	63.05
Total	350,633	96.26	13,623	3.74	364,256	21,217,328	1.72	40.96

== Demographics of South Region ==
2022 Brazilian census

White Brazilians are the majority of South Region with 72% as of 2022. The Brazilian states with the highest percentages of whites are the three located in the South of the country: Santa Catarina, Rio Grande do Sul and Paraná. These states, along with São Paulo, received an important influx of European immigrants in the period of the Great Immigration (1876–1914), similar to what happened in the other parts of the Southern Cone.

1. Rio Grande do Sul: 78.4% white
2. Santa Catarina: 76.3%
3. Paraná: 64.6%

Skin color/Race (2022)
White	72.6%
Mixed	21.7%
Black	5.0%
East Asian	0.4%
Indigenous	0.3%

== Criticism ==
Some academics claim that the movement bases its separatist claims in "natural differences", such as the region's climate, and that although these might create an "identity" for the region, the people and their culture are not much different from the rest of the country. Others claim there are cultural differences, such as in religion, literature, food, clothing, dances, music, etc. Some go as far as to say that Brazilians identify first with their home state, and only then as Brazilians.

== See also ==
- Immigration to Brazil
- Independence referendum
- Juliana Republic
- Lists of active separatist movements
- Riograndense Republic
- Southern Cone
- Nordeste Independente
- White flight
- Irton Marx
