= Regionalism (politics) =

Ideology that seeks to promote subnational administrative division interests

Regionalism is a political ideology that seeks to increase the political power, influence and self-determination of the people of one or more subnational regions. It focuses on the "development of a political or social system based on one or more" regions, and/or the national, normative, or economic interests of a specific region, group of regions or another subnational entity, gaining strength from or aiming to strengthen the "consciousness of and loyalty to a distinct region with a homogeneous population", similarly to nationalism. More specifically, "regionalism refers to three distinct elements: movements demanding territorial autonomy within unitary states; the organization of the central state on a regional basis for the delivery of its policies including regional development policies; political decentralization and regional autonomy".

Regions may be delineated by administrative divisions, culture, language and religion, among others. Regionalists' demands occur in "strong" forms (such as sovereigntism, separatism, sovereignty, secession and independence), as well as more "moderate" campaigns for greater autonomy (such as states' rights, decentralization or devolution). Strictly speaking, regionalists favour confederations over unitary nation states with strong central governments. They may, however, embrace intermediate forms of federalism. Proponents of regionalism usually claim that strengthening the governing bodies and political powers within a region, at the expense of a centralized government, will benefit local populations by improving regional or local economies, in terms of better fiscal responsibility, regional development, allocation of resources, implementation of localist policies and plans, competitiveness among regions and, ultimately, the whole country, consistent with the principle of subsidiarity.

== Definition ==
Regionalism, autonomism, separatism and nationalism are interrelated concepts, yet they often have different and sometimes opposite meanings. For instance, in Spain "regionalism" is regarded as strongly associated with "nationalism" and, often, "separatism", whereas in Italy, it is generally seen as a synonym of "federalism" and the opposite of "nationalism". In some cases movements or parties campaigning for independence may push for federalism or autonomy within the pre-existing nation state.

In developed, Western, liberal-democratic countries, secessionist parties include the Parti Québécois in Quebec (Canada), the Scottish National Party and the Scottish Greens in Scotland (United Kingdom), Plaid Cymru in Wales (United Kingdom) and, to some extent, Sinn Féin in Northern Ireland (United Kingdom), the New Flemish Alliance and Vlaams Belang in Flanders (Belgium), Corsica Libera in Corsica (France), the Basque Nationalist Party and Euskal Herria Bildu in the Basque Country (Spain and France), Together for Catalonia, the Republican Left of Catalonia and Popular Unity Candidacy in Catalonia and the Catalan Countries (Spain and France), the Galician Nationalist Bloc in Galicia (Spain), South Tyrolean Freedom and Die Freiheitlichen in South Tyrol (Italy), factions of Lega and several minor parties in northern Italy (Italy), nominally the Sardinian Action Party and several minor parties in Sardinia. In developing countries they include the Polisario Front in Western Sahara (Morocco), the National Movement for the Liberation of Azawad in Azawad (Mali), the Front for the Liberation of the Enclave of Cabinda in the Cabinda Province (Angola), all national liberation movements and the Democratic Progressive Party in Taiwan (a country whose sovereignty is disputed by China). The European Free Alliance is a European political party, gathering mainly regionalist parties, including the aforementioned Scottish National Party, Plaid Cymru, New Flemish Alliance, Republican Left of Catalonia and many others.

Federalist and/or autonomist regional parties include the Coalition Avenir Québec in Quebec (Canada), the New Progressive Party and the Popular Democratic Party in Puerto Rico (a commonwealth of the United States), Femu a Corsica and the Party of the Corsican Nation in Corsica (France), Lega Nord and its sister/successor party Lega in northern Italy (the party has, at times, advocated Padania's independence and its "national section" in Veneto, Liga Veneta, is a mild proponent of Venetian independence), the Martinican Progressive Party in Martinique and the Communist Party of Réunion in Réunion (both French overseas territories) and the New Macau Association in Macau (China).

In some countries, the development of regionalist politics may be a prelude to further demands for greater autonomy or even full separation, especially when ethnic, cultural and economic disparities are present. This was demonstrated, among other examples, in the Socialist Federal Republic of Yugoslavia in the early 1990s.

== Regional vs. regionalist ==
Political parties that are regional are not necessarily regionalist parties. A "regional party" is any political party with its political base in a single region, whatever its objectives and platform may be, whereas "regionalist" parties are a subset of regional parties that specifically campaign for greater autonomy or independence in their region.

Examples of regional parties that do not generally campaign for greater autonomy or federalism include most provincial parties in Canada, most regional and minority parties in Europe, notably including the Christian Social Union in Bavaria (Germany), most political parties in Belgium, most political parties in Northern Ireland (United Kingdom), the Istrian Democratic Assembly in Istria (Croatia), the Alliance of Primorje-Gorski Kotar in Primorje-Gorski Kotar (Croatia) and most political parties in India.

Regional parties with an autonomist/federalist or separatist agendas have included the aforementioned Bloc Québécois, Lega Nord, the Vlaams Belang, the New Flemish Alliance, the defunct Catalan European Democratic Party, the Republican Left of Catalonia, the Scottish National Party, Plaid Cymru and Sinn Féin.

Because regional parties – including regionalist parties – often cannot receive enough votes or legislative seats to be politically powerful, they may join political alliances or seek to be part of a coalition government. Notable examples include the Christian Social Union in Bavaria (part of the CDU/CSU alliance at the federal level), the New Flemish Alliance's participation in the Federal Government of Belgium in 2014–2019 and since 2025, as well as Lega's frequent participation in the Italian government.

== See also ==
=== Lists ===
Lists of regional and regionalist parties are available at:

- List of political parties campaigning for self-government
- Lists of historical separatist movements
- Category:Independence movements
- Category:Regionalist parties
- Category:Political parties of minorities
- List of regional and minority parties in Europe
- Lists of active separatist movements
- European Free Alliance

=== Concepts ===
- Self-determination
- Self-governance
- Autonomism
- Subnational citizenship
- Decentralization
- Federalism
- Separatism
- Secession
- Sovereigntism
- Glocalization
- Think globally, act locally
- Localism
- Parochialism
- Minority group
- Ethnicity
- Ethnic party
- Country (identity)
- Bioregionalism

=== Countries ===
- Australia: West Australian secessionism; Tasmanian secessionism; Proposals for new Australian states
- Belgium: communities, regions and language areas; Languages; Economic regional differences
- Brazil: regions; Languages; movements (Sao Paulo independence movement, The South Is My Country)
- Canada: languages; Provinces; movements (Maritime Rights Movement; Quebec nationalism—Quebec sovereignty movement; Western alienation—Alberta separatism, Cascadia movement)
- China: languages; Ethnic groups; movements (Hong Kong independence movement, Hong Kong Autonomy Movement, Inner Mongolian independence movement, Taiwanese nationalism, Taiwan independence movement, Tibetan independence movement, East Turkestan independence movement)
- Croatia: minority languages;movements (Dalmatianism, Istrian identity)
- Denmark: languages; dialects; Realm; movements (Faroese nationalism (Faroese independence movement; Greenlandic independence)
- France: movements (Basque nationalism, Breton nationalism, Corsican nationalism, Occitan nationalism)
- Germany: dialects; movements (Bavarian nationalism)
- Italy: languages; North–South divide; movements (Friuli Movement; Lombard nationalism; Padanian nationalism; Sardinian nationalism; Sicilian nationalism; Southern Italy autonomist movements; South Tyrolean independence movement; Venetian nationalism)
- Romania: languages; ethnic minorities; movements (Székely autonomy movement)
- Russia: languages; movements (Chechen Republic of Ichkeria, Circassian nationalism, Siberian regionalism), insurgency in the North Caucasus
- South Africa: languages; Afrikaner nationalism (Volkstaat)
- Spain: languages; National and regional identity in Spain (Andalusian nationalism, Aragonese nationalism, Asturian nationalism, Basque nationalism, Canarian nationalism, Castilian nationalism, Catalan nationalism–independence, Galician nationalism, Leonesism, Valencian nationalism etc.)
- United Kingdom: countries; Languages; North–South divide (England, Scotland, Wales); nationalisms (Cornish nationalism–devolution, English nationalism–independence, Irish nationalism–republicanism, Scottish nationalism–independence, Ulster nationalism, Welsh nationalism–independence)
- United States: secessionism; Free State Project, Alaskan Independence Party, Yes California, Cascadia movement, Hawaiian sovereignty movement, Neo-Confederates, New England secession movements, Northwest Territorial Imperative, Puerto Rico independence movement, Texas secession movements, Second Vermont Republic

== Bibliography ==
- Smith-Peter, Susan (2018). Imagining Russian Regions: Subnational Identity and Civil Society in Nineteenth-Century Russia. Leiden: Brill. ISBN 9789004353497
- Smith-Peter, Susan (2018) "The Six Waves of Russian Regionalism in European Context, 1830-2000," in Russia's Regional Identities: The Power of the Provinces, ed. Edith W. Clowes, Gisela Erbsloh and Ani Kokobobo. New York: Routledge, 15-43.
