= List of historical separatist movements in Africa =

This is a list of historical separatist movements in Africa. Separatism includes autonomism and secessionism.

== Criteria ==
What is and is not considered an autonomist or secessionist movement is sometimes contentious. Entries on this list must meet three criteria:

1. They are no longer an active movement with active members.
2. They are demanded greater autonomy or self-determination for a geographic region (as opposed to personal autonomy).
3. They were citizens/people of the conflict area and did not come from another country.

Under each region listed is one or more of the following:

- De facto state (de facto entity): for unrecognized regions with de facto autonomy.
- Proposed state: proposed name for a seceding sovereign state.
- Proposed autonomous area: for movements towards greater autonomy for an area but not outright secession.
  - De facto autonomous government: for governments with de facto autonomous control over a region.
  - Government-in-exile: for a government based outside of the region in question, with or without control.
  - Political party (or parties): for political parties involved in a political system to push for autonomy or secession.
  - Militant organisation(s): for armed organisations.
  - Advocacy group(s): for non-belligerent, non-politically participatory entities.
  - Ethnic/ethno-religious/racial/regional/religious group(s).

== List ==
=== Algeria ===
(To Gain independence from Algeria on July 5, 1962)

- Political party: Mouvement D'Auto-Détermination De la Kabylie (MAK)
- Rebel organization: Front de Libération Nationale is calling for its dissolution. The French is describing it as a terrorist movement.
- Parallel government: Provisional

=== Angola ===
- Political party: Popular Movement for the Liberation of Angola (MPLA), National Union for the Total Independence of Angola (UNITA), National Front for the Liberation of Angola (FNLA)
- Parallel government: Revolutionary Government of Angola in Exile (GRAE)

=== Botswana ===
- Political party: Botswana Democratic Party (BDP), Botswana People's Party (BPP)

=== Burundi ===
- Political party: Union for National Progress (UPRONA)

=== Cameroon ===
- Political party: Rassemblement camerounais (RACAM), Union of the Peoples of Cameroon (UPC)
- Rebel organizations: National Liberation Army of Kamerun (ALNK)

==== Bakassi ====
- Militant organization: Bakassi Movement for Self-Determination

=== Cape Verde and Guinea-Bissau ===
- Political party: African Party for the Independence of Guinea and Cape Verde (PAIGC), Struggle Front for the National Independence of Guinea (FLING)

=== Central African Republic ===
- Political party: Movement for the Social Evolution of Black Africa (MÉSAN)

=== Côte d'Ivoire ===
- Rebel organization: Patriotic Movement of Côte d'Ivoire (MPCI)

=== Democratic Republic of the Congo ===
- Political party: Mouvement National Congolais (MNC), ABAKO

==== Katanga ====
- Political party: Confederation of the Tribal Associations of Katanga (CONAKAT)

=== Egypt ===
- Political party: Wafd Party

=== Eritrea ===
- Rebel organization: Eritrean Liberation Front (ELF), Eritrean People's Liberation Front (EPLF)

=== France (associated territories) ===
- Réunion

Autonomist movement

- Political party: Communist Party of Réunion (which still exists, but has abandoned its goal of autonomy)

=== Ghana ===
- Political party: Convention People's Party (CPP), United Gold Coast Convention (UGCC)
- Self-government experiment: Fante Confederation

=== Kenya ===
- Political party: East Africa Association, Kenya African National Union (KANU), Kikuyu Central Association, Young Kikuyu Association
- Rebel organization: Kenya Land and Freedom Army (KLFA or Mau Mau)

=== Mali ===
- Political party: Sudanese Union (US)

=== Mauritius ===
- Political party: Mauritius Labour Party (MLP), Mauritian Militant Movement (MMM)

=== Morocco ===
- Political party: Istiqlal Party, National Action Bloc

=== Mozambique ===
- Political party: Mozambican Liberation Front (FRELIMO)

=== Namibia ===
- Political party: South-West Africa People's Organisation (SWAPO), South West Africa National Union (SWANU)
- Rebel organizations: People's Liberation Army of Namibia (PLAN),

=== Niger ===
- Political party: Nigerien Progressive Party, Sawaba

=== Nigeria ===
- Political party: Nigerian National Democratic Party (NNDP), National Council of Nigeria and the Cameroons (NCNC), Action Group, Egbe Omo Oduduwa, Northern People's Congress
- Sessionist Entity: Indigenous People of Biafra

=== São Tomé and Príncipe ===
- Political party: Committee for the Liberation of São Tomé and Príncipe (CLSTP), Movement for the Liberation of São Tomé and Príncipe (MLSTP)

=== Seychelles ===
- Political party: Seychelles Democratic Party (SDP), Seychelles People's United Party (SPUP)

=== Sierra Leone ===
- Political party: Sierra Leone People's Party (SLPP), West African Youth League (WAYL)

=== Somalia ===
- Political party: Somali Youth League (SYL)

==== Somaliland ====
- Rebel organization: Somali National Movement (SNM)

=== South Africa ===
- Secessionist movement: Eastern Cape Separatist League

=== Sudan ===
- Political party: Democratic Unionist Party (DUP), Sudanese Communist Party, Umma Party

=== Tanzania ===
==== Tanganyika ====
- Political party: Tanganyika African Association, Tanganyika African National Union

==== Zanzibar ====
- Political party: Afro-Shirazi Party (ASP), Zanzibar Nationalist Party (ZNP)

=== Tunisia ===
- Political party: Destour, Young Tunisians, Neo Destour (ND)

=== Uganda ===
- Political party: Rwenzururu Secessionist Movement, Uganda People's Congress (UPC)

=== Zambia ===
- Political party: Northern Rhodesian African National Congress, United National Independence Party (UNIP), Zambian African National Congress (ZANC)

=== Zimbabwe ===
- Political party: Zimbabwe African National Union (ZANU), Zimbabwe African People's Union (ZAPU)
- Rebel organizations: Zimbabwe African National Liberation Army (ZANLA), Zimbabwe People's Revolutionary Army (ZIPRA)

== See also ==
- List of historical unrecognized states and dependencies
- List of active separatist movements recognized by intergovernmental organizations
- Lists of separatist movements
