= List of historical separatist movements in Oceania =

This is a list of historical separatist movements in Oceania. Separatism includes autonomism and secessionism.

== Criteria ==
What is and is not considered an autonomist or secessionist movement is sometimes contentious. Entries on this list must meet three criteria:

1. They are no longer an active movement with active members.
2. They are demanded greater autonomy or self-determination for a geographic region (as opposed to personal autonomy).
3. They were citizens/people of the conflict area and did not come from another country.

Under each region listed is one or more of the following:

- De facto state (de facto entity): for unrecognized regions with de facto autonomy.
- Proposed state: proposed name for a seceding sovereign state.
- Proposed autonomous area: for movements towards greater autonomy for an area but not outright secession.
  - De facto autonomous government: for governments with de facto autonomous control over a region.
  - Government-in-exile: for a government based outside of the region in question, with or without control.
  - Political party (or parties): for political parties involved in a political system to push for autonomy or secession.
  - Militant organisation(s): for armed organisations.
  - Advocacy group(s): for non-belligerent, non-politically participatory entities.
  - Ethnic/ethno-religious/racial/regional/religious group(s).

== List ==
=== Australia ===
Mainland Australia

- Tasmania (See: Secessionism in Tasmania)
- Western Australia (See: Secessionism in Western Australia)

Eastern New Guinea

- Proposed state: Papua
  - Political party: Papua Besena

=== New Zealand ===
South Island

- Proposed autonomous region: New Munster
  - Political parties: South Island Party
  - Pressure group: Southern Separation League

Western Samoa

- Protest movement: Mau movement

=== United Kingdom (associated territories) ===
Solomon Islands

- Protest movement: Maasina Ruru

=== Vanuatu ===
Espiritu Santo

- Proposed state: Vemerana
  - Political party: Nagriamel

== See also ==
- List of historical unrecognized states and dependencies
- List of active separatist movements recognized by intergovernmental organizations
- Lists of separatist movements
