= Independentista =

Independentista may refer to:

- Independentista (Catalonia)
- Independentista (Galicia Spain)
- Independentista (Puerto Rico)

== See also ==
- Lists of active separatist movements
