= Tinago Falls =

Coordinates: 8°09′33″N 124°11′09″E

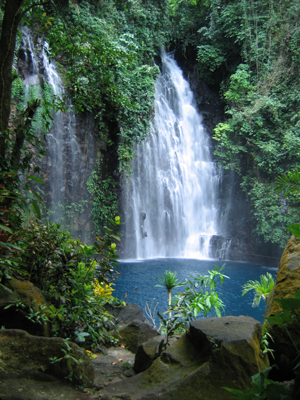
- Tinago Falls in Linamon, Lanao del Norte, Philippines
- Interactive map of Tinago Falls
- Location: Linamon, Lanao del Norte, Mindanao, Philippines
- Type: Fan
- Total height: 73.152 m (240.0 ft)
- Number of drops: 5
- Longest drop: 73.152 m (240.0 ft)
- Average width: 100 feet (30 m)

Tinago Falls is a waterfall on the Agus River, located in the town of Linamon, Lanao del Norte in the northern part of the Philippine island of Mindanao. It is one of the main tourist attractions of Lanao del Norte, known as The Land of Beauty and Bounty.

Tinago is a Filipino term meaning "hidden", the falls being hidden in a deep ravine. Trekking to the falls requires approximately 500 descending steps called the winding staircase.

The falls is high, cold water cascading into a deep and calm basin-like pool. Under the falls is a small cave where people can enter and listen to the rumbling waters.

== Legend ==
Folklore has it that there once lived an influential and powerful Sultan Agok and his wife. They were appointed by their people as their king and queen. But they became too proud of themselves and became selfish rulers of their kingdom. When the sultan's wife was pregnant, an enchantress, disguised as a beggar, begged for their help but instead they rejected her. Because of this, the enchantress cursed the couple's future child's appearance. She will be born ugly.

The child was indeed born ugly. The couple was sad and disappointed, expecting the baby to be as lovely as her mother. They hid the child in a cave to avoid embarrassment and named the baby Tin-ag, which means "hidden face". They visited and took care of the baby in the cave.

When the child grew up, she went out of the cave and was amazed by the outside world. However, people were not kind to her and she suffered from their taunts and jeers. The enchantress, saw her suffering and wanted to help. Tin-ag wanted to be transformed into a thing of beauty and splendor. The enchantress acquiesced. But unbeknownst to Tin-ag, she was to be transformed into a waterfall. She indeed became so beautiful and lovely. This is now known as Tinago Falls in Linamon, Lanao del Norte.

== Geography ==
Tinago Falls is located in a deep ravine in Barangay Roboccon, Linamon, Lanao del Norte. The falls plunges 240 feet (73 m) high from a cliff.

== Gallery ==
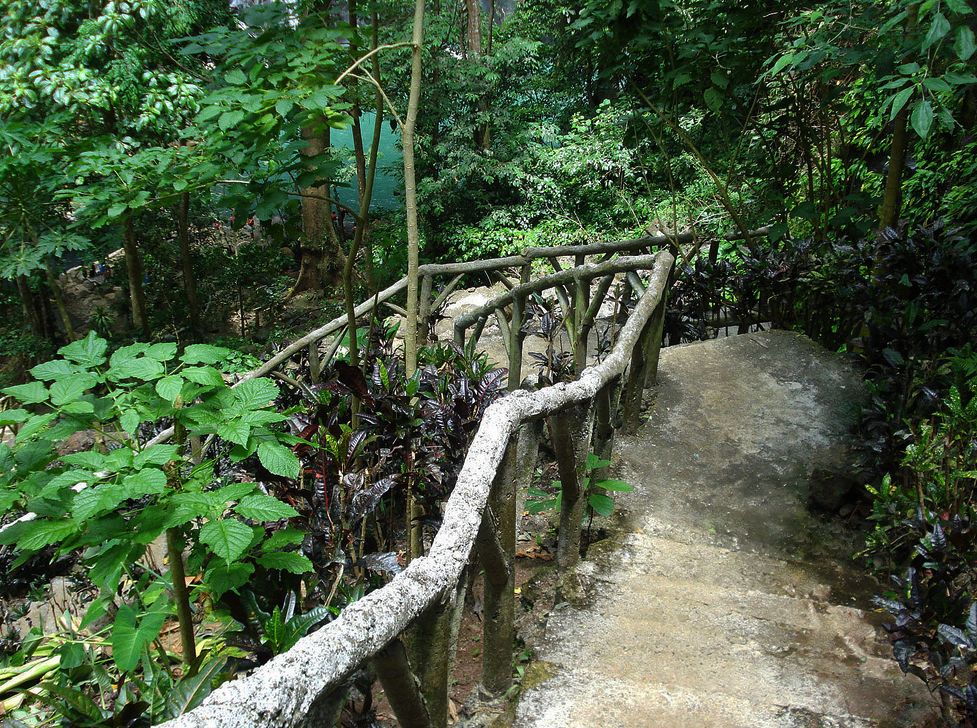
A winding staircase with 500 descending steps towards the falls

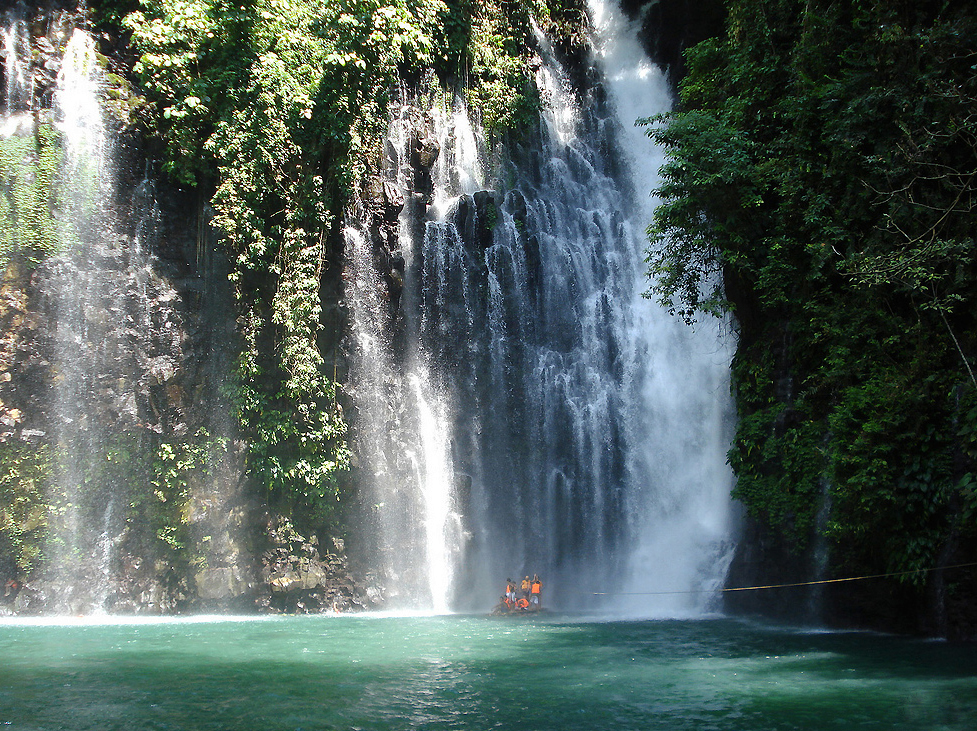
Closeup of the falls

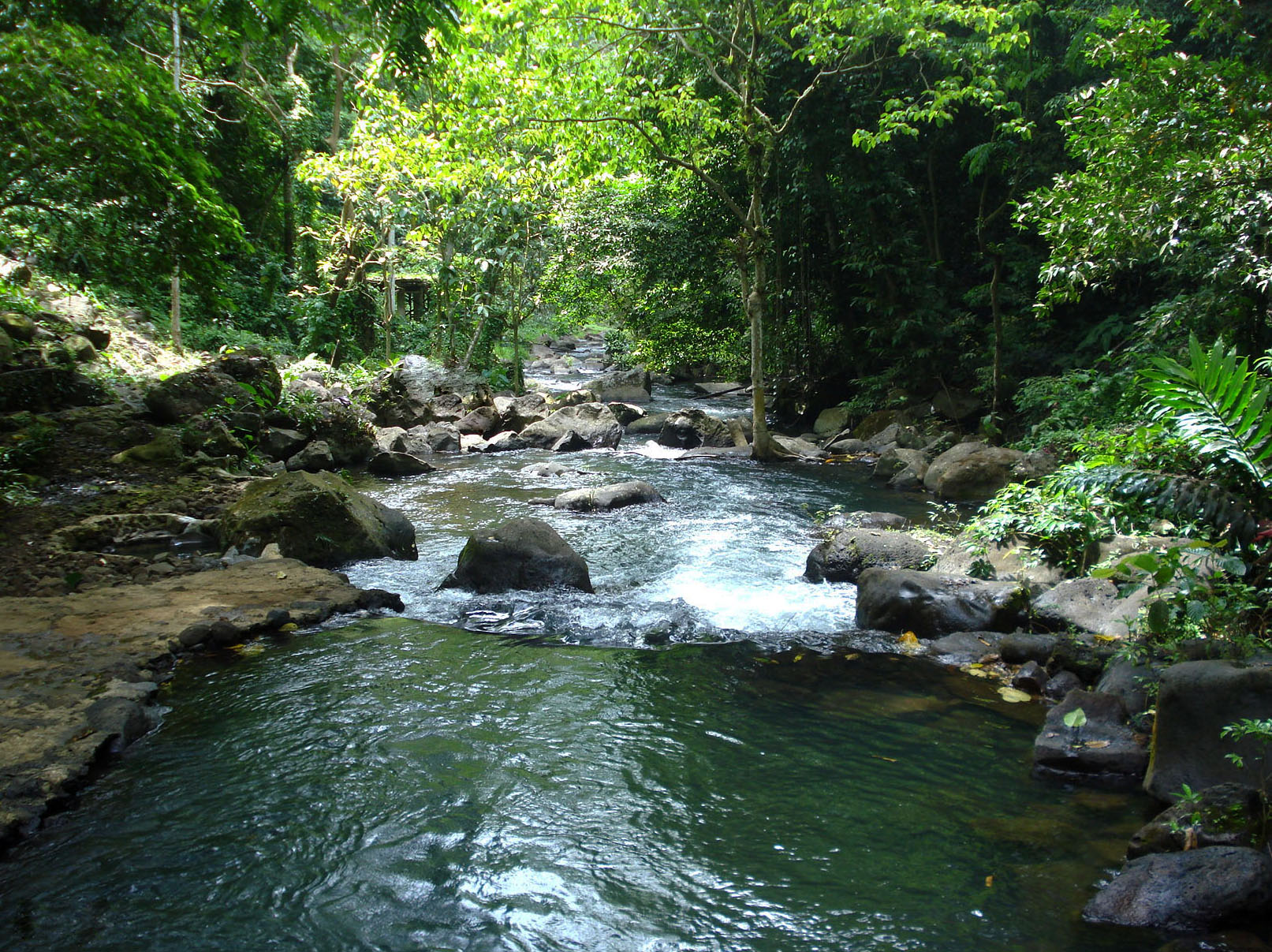
Small streams that branch out from Tinago falls

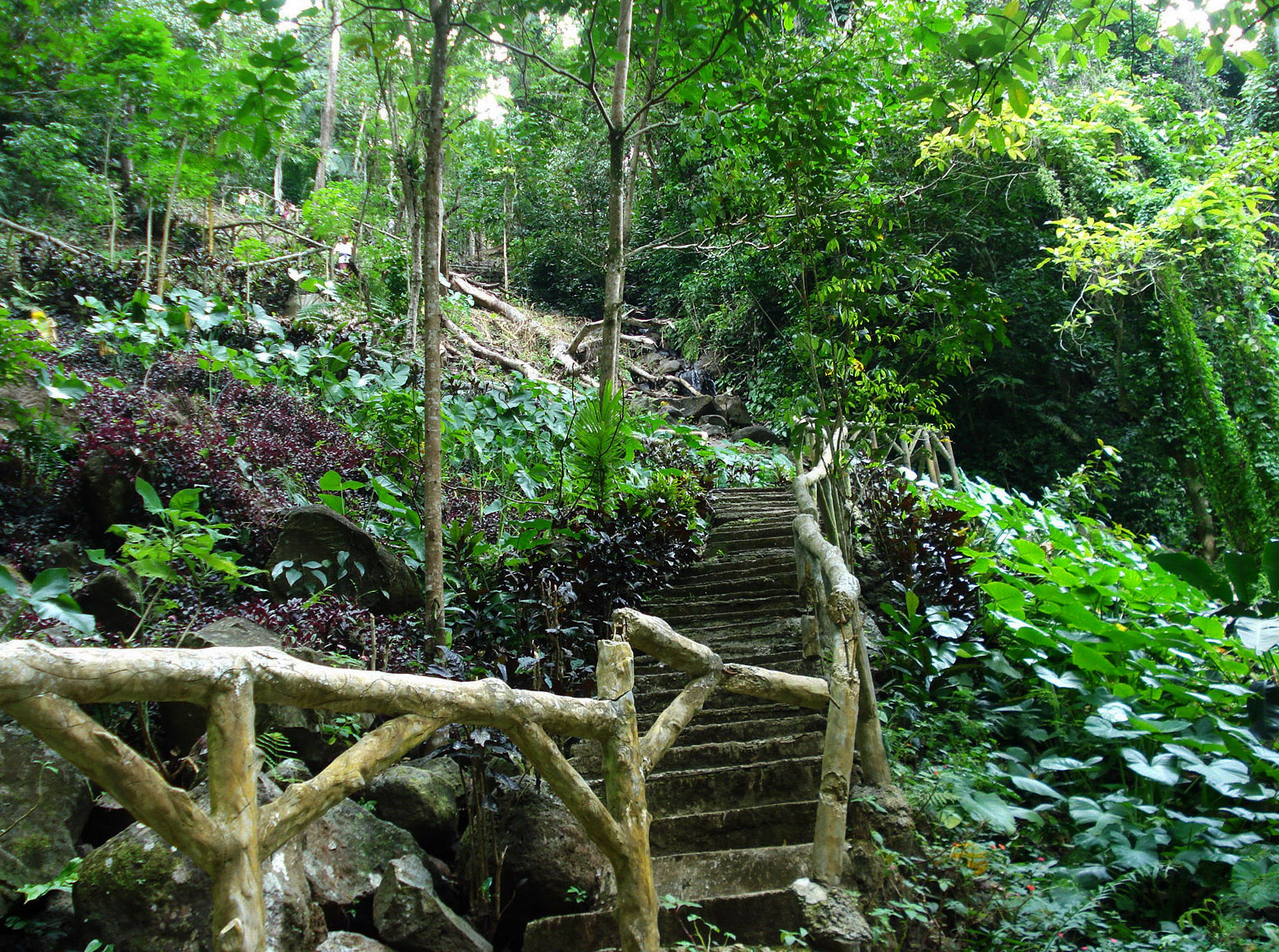
The staircase from below

== See also ==
- List of waterfalls
- Maria Cristina Falls
- Iligan City
- Linamon, Lanao del Norte
- Lanao del Norte
- Lake Lanao
