= List of historical separatist movements in Asia =

This is a list of historical separatist movements in Asia. Separatism includes autonomism and secessionism.

== Criteria ==
What is and is not considered an autonomist or secessionist movement is sometimes contentious. Entries on this list must meet three criteria:

1. They are no longer an active movement with active members.
2. They are demanded greater autonomy or self-determination for a geographic region (as opposed to personal autonomy).
3. They were citizens/people of the conflict area and did not come from another country.

Under each region listed is one or more of the following:

- De facto state (de facto entity): for unrecognized regions with de facto autonomy.
- Proposed state: proposed name for a seceding sovereign state.
- Proposed autonomous area: for movements towards greater autonomy for an area but not outright secession.
  - De facto autonomous government: for governments with de facto autonomous control over a region.
  - Government-in-exile: for a government based outside of the region in question, with or without control.
  - Political party (or parties): for political parties involved in a political system to push for autonomy or secession.
  - Militant organisation(s): for armed organisations.
  - Advocacy group(s): for non-belligerent, non-politically participatory entities.
  - Ethnic/ethno-religious/racial/regional/religious group(s).

== List ==
=== Azerbaijan ===
People: Armenian people

- Political party: Government of Artsakh
- Proposed de facto state: Republic of Artsakh
- Status: Inactive following Azerbaijan's siege, military conquest, and the subsequent expulsion of the entire Armenian population.

=== Bangladesh ===
- People: Jumma people
  - Political party: Porbotto Chottogram Jonshonghoti Shomiti
  - Rebel organisation: Shanti Bahini
  - Proposed state: Autonomous Hill Tribes
  - Status: Inactive following the 1996 peace treaty between the Government of Bangladesh and the tribal leaders.
- People: Bengali Hindus
  - Political party: Swadhin Bangabhumi Andolan
  - Rebel organisation: Banga Sena
  - Proposed State: Bangabhumi

=== China ===
Mainland China

- De facto state: Chinese Soviet Republic
  - Political party: Chinese Communist Party
  - Armed organization: Chinese Red Army
- Proposed state: People's Republic of China
  - Political party: Chinese Communist Party

Outer Mongolia

- De facto state: Great Mongolian State
  - Political organization: Bogd Khanate
- Proposed state: Mongolian People's Republic
  - Political party: Mongolian People's Revolutionary Party

=== Cyprus ===
- Rebel organizations: EOKA, Turkish Resistance Organisation

=== France (associated territories) ===
Indochina

- Proposed state: Kingdom of Cambodia
  - Political organization: Khmer Issarak
- Proposed state: Laos
- Militant organization: Lao Issara, Pathet Lao
- Proposed state: (South Vietnam) State of Vietnam
  - Political organization: Viet Quoc

Mandate of Syria

- Political organization: National Bloc

=== India ===
- People: Sikh
  - Militant organisation: Khalistan Liberation Force, Babbar Khalsa, Khalistan Commando Force
  - Proposed state: Khalistan
  - Status: Armed insurgency crushed
- People: Tripuri
  - Militant organisation: National Liberation Front of Tripura, All Tripura Tiger Force
  - Proposed state: Tipperaland
  - Status: Separatist movement crushed. Separatist groups disbanded, surrender agreement signed with government.
- People: Garo, Khasi
  - Militant organisation: Garo National Liberation Army, Hynniewtrep National Liberation Council
  - Proposed state: Garoland, Hynniewtrep
  - Status: Separatist movement crushed
- People: Bodo
  - Militant organisation: National Democratic Front of Boroland
  - Proposed state: Boroland
  - Status: Separatist groups disbanded, surrender agreement signed with government.
- People: Karbi
  - Militant organisation: Karbi Longri N.C. Hills Liberation Front, United People's Democratic Solidarity
  - Proposed state: Hemprek Kangthim
  - Status: Separatist movement crushed. Groups disbanded, surrender agreement signed with government.
- People: Dimasa
  - Militant organisation: Dima Halam Daogah
  - Proposed state: Dimaraji
  - Status: Separatist movement crushed. Groups disbanded, surrender agreement signed with government.
- People: Tani
  - Militant organisation: National Liberation Council of Taniland
  - Proposed state: Taniland
  - Status: Separatist movement crushed
- People: Mizo
  - Militant organisation: Mizo National Front
  - Proposed state: Mizoram Sawrkar
  - Status: Separatist movement crushed, peace accord signed with government.

=== Indonesia ===
Aceh

- Proposed state: Aceh
  - Militant organization: Free Aceh Movement

=== Iran ===
Kurdistan

- Proposed state: Republic of Mahabad
  - Militant organization: Democratic Party of Kurdistan

Iranian Azerbaijan

- Proposed state: Azerbaijan People's Government
  - Militant organization: Azerbaijani Democratic Party

Khorasan

- Proposed state: Autonomous Government of Khorasan
  - Militant organization: National Committee of Khorasan(Komitey-e Melli-e Khorasan)

=== Israel/Palestine ===
Samaritans in Nablus Governorate, West Bank

- Proposed state: Mount Gerizim

=== Timor ===
- Proposed state: Timor-Leste
  - Political party: Revolutionary Front for an Independent East Timor

=== Japan ===
Ezo

- De facto state: Republic of Ezo

=== Maldives ===
Suvadives

- Proposed state: United Suvadive Republic

=== Netherlands (associated territories) ===
Dutch East Indies

- Proposed state: Republic of Indonesia

=== Oman ===
Dhofar

- Militant organizations: Dhofar Liberation Front (DLF), Popular Front for the Liberation of Oman (PFLO), Popular Front for the Liberation of the Occupied Arabian Gulf/Popular Front for the Liberation of Oman and the Arabian Gulf (PFLOAG)

=== Pakistan ===
East Pakistan

- People: Bengalis (East Pakistanis)
  - Political party: All-Pakistan Awami League
  - Rebel organization: Mukti Bahini
  - De facto state: People's Republic of Bangladesh
  - Status: Resulted in independence of Bangladesh in 1971 after the Bangladesh Liberation War.

=== Philippines ===
Bangsamoro (Mindanao, Sulu Islands, and Palawan)

- Proposed state: Bangsamoro Republik
  - Political organization: Moro National Liberation Front
  - Militant organization: Bangsamoro Armed Forces
- Proposed state: Bangsamoro Autonomous Region (originally for independence)
  - Political organization: Moro Islamic Liberation Front
  - Militant organization: Bangsamoro Islamic Armed Forces
- Proposed state: Federal Republic of Mindanao
  - Militant organization: Mindanao People's Democratic Movement
  - Advocacy group: Mindanao Independence Movement, Mindanao Freedom Movement

=== Saudi Arabia ===
Hejaz

- Proposed state: Kingdom of Hejaz (restoration of historical kingdom)
  - Political organization: Committee for the Liberation of Arabia

=== Spain (associated territories) ===
Spanish East Indies

- Philippine archipelago
  - Secessionist entities: Katagalugan, Republic of the Philippines, Cantonal Republic of Negros, Republic of Zamboanga
    - Militant organization: Katipunan
    - Society: La Liga Filipina
  - Ilocos
    - Secessionist state: Free Ilocos

=== Sri Lanka ===
Sri Lankan Tamil people

- Proposed state: Tamil Eelam
  - Political party: Tamil National Alliance
  - Militant organisation: Liberation Tigers of Tamil Eelam
  - Advocacy groups: Transnational Government of Tamil Eelam, Global Tamil Forum
  - Government in exile: Transnational Government of Tamil Eelam

=== Syria ===
Syrian Druze

- Proposed state: Jabal Druze State
- Rebel organization: Jaysh al-Muwahhideen

=== Turkey ===
- Political party: Armenian Revolutionary Federation, Social Democrat Hunchakian Party, Armenian Democratic Liberal Party (Ramgavar Party): all part of the Armenian national movement.
- Rebel organization: Armenian Secret Army for the Liberation of Armenia
- Status: Inactive following Turkey's genocide in Western Armenia and the region's annexation following the Turkish invasion of Armenia. The territory of Western Armenia was surrendered to Turkey during the Treaty of Alexandropol.

=== United Kingdom (associated territories) ===
Burma

- Political organization: Dobama Asiayone
- Militant organization: Anti-Fascist People's Freedom League, Burma Independence Army, Communist Party of Burma

India

- Proposed state: India
  - Political party: All India Forward Bloc, Hindustan Socialist Republican Association, Indian National Congress, Communist Party of India, Swaraj Party, Ghadar Party
  - Parallel government: Arzi Hukumat-e-Azad Hind
  - Rebel organization: Indian National Army

Malaya

- Proposed state: Federation of Malaya
- Political party: Alliance Party (United Malays National Organisation, Malayan Chinese Association, and Malayan Indian Congress)

Penang

- Ethnic groups: Penangites, Penangite Chinese
- Proposed state: Penang
- Organization: Penang Chamber of Commerce, Penang Straits Chinese British Association, Penang Chinese Town Hall, Penang Chamber of Commerce, Penang Indian Chamber of Commerce, Settlement of Penang Association, Penang Eurasian Association, Penang Muslim Chamber of Commerce

=== United States (associated territories) ===
Commonwealth of the Philippines

- Political party: Nacionalista Party
- Proposed state: Republic of the Philippines

Mindanao

- Ethnic group: Maranao
- Proposed state: Separate independence for Mindanao from the Luzon and Visayas regions. (See Dansalan Declaration)

== See also ==
- List of historical unrecognized states and dependencies
- List of active separatist movements recognized by intergovernmental organizations
