= List of historical separatist movements in North America =

Former separatist movements

This is a list of historical separatist movements in North America. Separatism includes autonomism and secessionism.

== Criteria ==
What is and is not considered an autonomist or secessionist movement is sometimes contentious. Entries on this list must meet three criteria:

1. They are no longer an active movement with active members.
2. They are demanded greater autonomy or self-determination for a geographic region (as opposed to personal autonomy).
3. They were citizens/people of the conflict area and did not come from another country.

Under each region listed is one or more of the following:

- De facto state (de facto entity): for unrecognized regions with de facto autonomy.
- Proposed state: proposed name for a seceding sovereign state.
- Proposed autonomous area: for movements towards greater autonomy for an area but not outright secession.
  - De facto autonomous government: for governments with de facto autonomous control over a region.
  - Government-in-exile: for a government based outside of the region in question, with or without control.
  - Political party (or parties): for political parties involved in a political system to push for autonomy or secession.
  - Militant organisation(s): for armed organisations.
  - Advocacy group(s): for non-belligerent, non-politically participatory entities.
  - Ethnic/ethno-religious/racial/regional/religious group(s).

== List ==
=== Antigua and Barbuda ===
- Political party: Antigua Labour Party

=== Bahamas ===
- Abaco Islands
  - Political parties: Abaco Independence Movement (defunct)
- Progressive Liberal Party (PLP)

=== Barbados ===
Culpepper Island

- Proposed state: Lokono-Arawak Nation
  - Political parties: United Confederation of Taino People (UCTP), Eagle Clan of Lokono-Arawaks (ECLA)
  - Militant organisation: Indigenous Democracy Defense Organization (IDDO)

=== Belize ===
- Political party: People's United Party

=== British West Indies ===
- Political party: Caribbean League
- Secessionist entity: West Indies Federation

=== Canada ===
==== Autonomist ====
- Acadia
  - Political party: Parti Acadien
- Cape Breton Island
  - Political party: Cape Breton Labour Party
- the Maritimes
  - Political party: the Maritimes
- Ontario
  - Political party: Northern Ontario Heritage Party
- Quebec
  - Political party: Action démocratique du Québec

==== Secessionist ====
- Nova Scotia
  - Political: Anti-Confederation Party
- Ontario
  - Political: Ontario Independence League, Northern Ontario Heritage Party
- Quebec
  - Pressure group: Alliance Laurentienne, Chevaliers de l'Indépendance, Mouvement de Libération Nationale du Québec, Réseau de Résistance du Québécois
  - Political party: Mouvement Souveraineté-Association, Option citoyenne, Parti de la Democratie Socialiste, Parti indépendantiste, Parti nationaliste du Québec, Option nationale, Ralliement National, Rassemblement pour l'Indépendance Nationale, Union des forces progressistes, Parti québécois, Union Populaire, Québec solidaire
  - Rebel organization: Société des Fils de la Liberté, Frères Chasseurs, Comité de libération nationale (Quebec), Réseaux de résistance, Armée révolutionnaire du Québec, Front de libération du Québec
- Western Canada
  - Political: Unionest Party, Separation Party of Alberta, Alberta Independence Party

=== Costa Rica ===
- Political party: Independent Guanacaste Party

=== Dominica ===
- Political party: Dominica Labour Party

==== Autonomist ====
Kalinago Territory

- Proposed state: Karifuna-Carib Nation
  - Political parties: Kalinago Tribal Nation, United Confederation of Taino People (UCTP)

=== Haiti ===
- Cacos (anti-US occupation)

=== Jamaica ===
- Political party: Jamaica Labour Party, People's National Party

Leeward Maroons

- Proposed state: Accompong Town Maroon Community
  - Political organizations: Maroon Council

=== Mexico ===
Secessionist

- California Republic
- Chan Santa Cruz
- Republic of Fredonia
- Republic of the Rio Grande
- Republic of Texas
- Republic of Yucatán
- Republic of Baja California
- Republic of Sonora

=== Nicaragua ===
- Ejército Defensor de la Soberanía Nacional (anti-US occupation)

=== Panama ===
- Kuna Revolution (Republic of Tule)

=== Saint Vincent and the Grenadines ===
Carib Country (Black Carib Indigenous communities north of the Rabacca River: Orange Hill, Overland, Sandy Bay, Point, Owia and Fancy)

- Proposed state: Yurumein
- Former reservations:Old Sandy Bay, Petit Bonum, Morne Ronde, Lariki, Grieggs
- Political parties: Campaign for the Development of the Carib Community(CDCC), Garifuna Indigenous People of St. Vincent and the Grenadines Inc (GIPSVG), United Confederation of Taino People (UCTP)

=== Trinidad and Tobago ===
- Political party: People's National Movement
- Political party: Tobago Organisation of the People

=== United States ===
- American Revolution
- Aztlán
- Confederate States of America
  - Free State of Jones
  - Republic of Winston
  - Kingdom of Callaway
  - Dade County, Georgia
  - State of Scott
  - Free State of Van Zandt
- New England's Secession Conventions of 1803, 1808, 1814, and 1843
- Republic of New Afrika
- State of Franklin, secessionist North Carolina western territory (1784–1789)
- State of Muskogee, secessionist Florida territory (1799 - 1803)
- For historic Texas separatist movements, see Mexico, above.
- Republic of West Florida
- Conch Republic
- Capitol Hill Occupied Protest

==== Puerto Rico ====
- Anti-Colonial National Liberation Movement

Puerto Rican Independence Movement
Partido Independentista Puertorriqueño (PIP)

== See also ==
- List of historical unrecognized states and dependencies
- List of active separatist movements recognized by intergovernmental organizations
- Lists of separatist movements
