= Amai Pakpak Medical Center =

Government hospital in Lanao del Sur, Philippines

- Department of Health
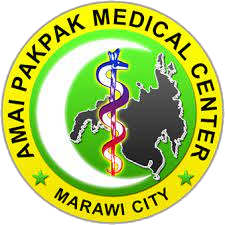

Geography
- Location: Marawi, Lanao del Sur, Bangsamoro, Philippines
- Coordinates: 8°00′17″N 124°17′01″E

Services
- Beds: 400

History
- Former name: Lanao General Hospital

Links
- Website: apmc.doh.gov.ph

The Amai Pakpak Medical Center (APMC) is a government hospital in Marawi, Lanao del Sur, Philippines.

== History ==
The hospital was established in 1903 by the US Army's 27th Infantry Cavalry Division led by Captain John J. Pershing in a 20 hectares (49 acres) land which was then known as Marahui which became known as Camp Keithley. In 1903, Captain James Ames organized it into a 25-bed hospital amidst a cholera outbreak which killed several US military personnel as well as locals. The health facility was later renamed as the Lanao General Hospital. It became widely known by locals by the name Public Hospital. The hospital went to the supervision of the Integrated Provincial Health Office of Lanao del Sur when the integration program of the health system of Lanao Province was launched in 1984.

Lanao General Hospital then went under a renationalization through Republic Act No. 7943 which became law in 1985. Under the aforementioned law it was renamed as the Amai Pakpak Medical Center after 19th century military leader Amai Pakpak who is regarded as a hero by the Maranaos. On October 16, 2013, a fire ravaged the century-old hospital, but the hospital managed to resume operations. The hospital was again badly damaged following the Marawi crisis of 2017. The Department of Health planned to reopen the hospital again.

The hospital reopened and later served as a major health facility responding to the COVID-19 pandemic in the Bangsamoro region.
