= Agus River =

River in Mindanao, Philippines

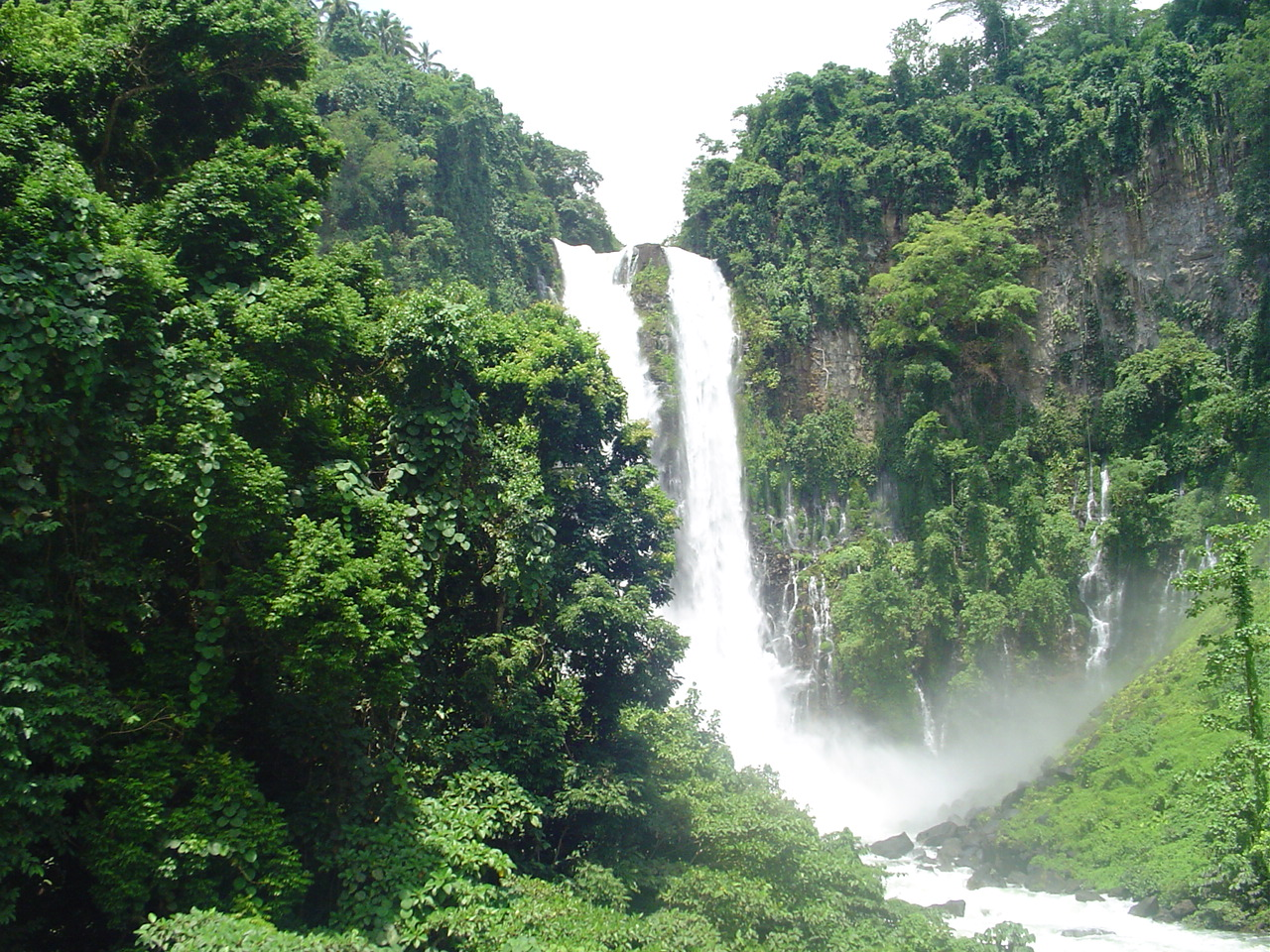
- Maria Cristina Falls, a prominent geographical landmark on the Agus River

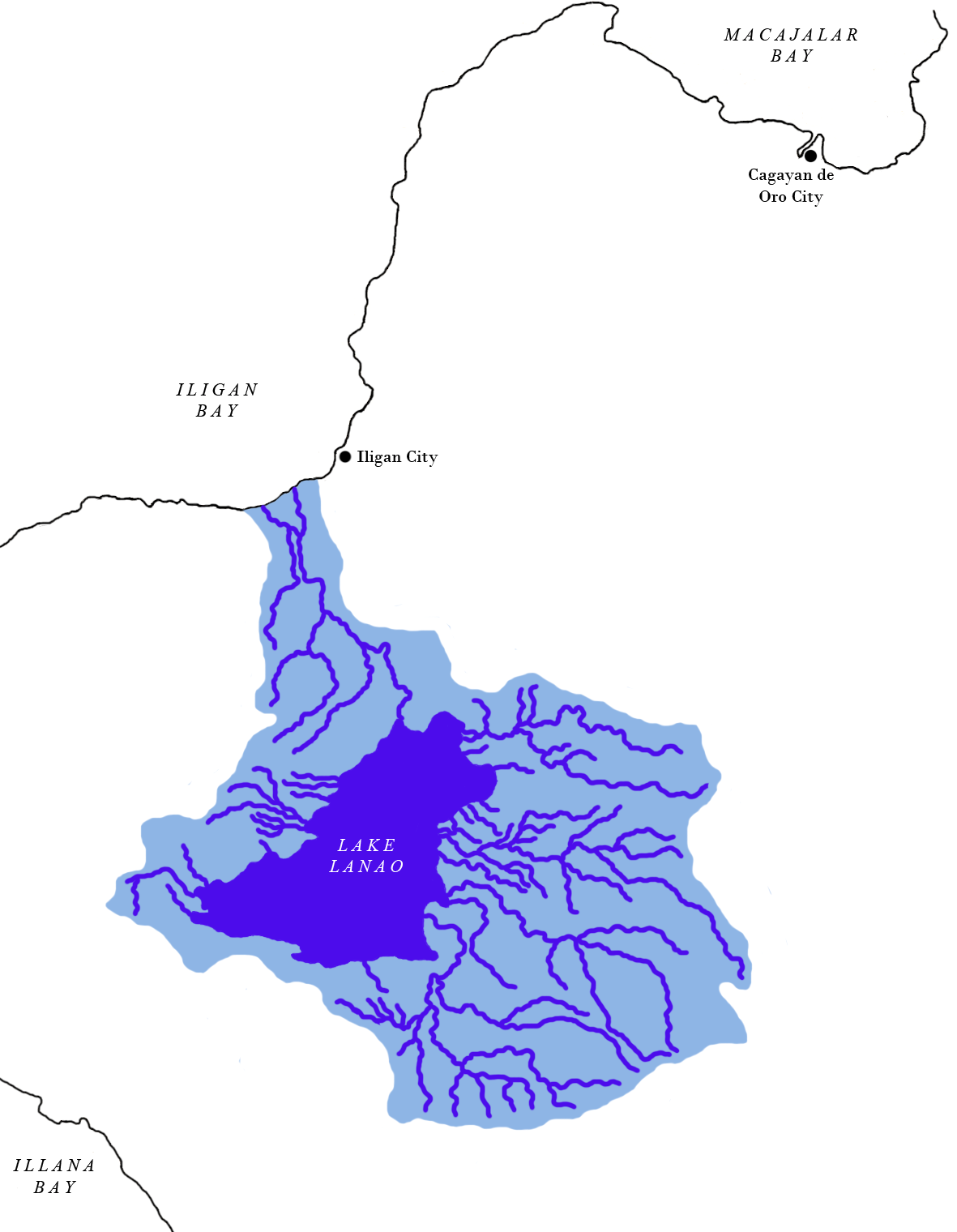
- Lake Lanao-Agus River watershed area

- Agus River mouth Agus River (Philippines)
- Native name: Suba sa Agus (Cebuano); Lawasaig sa Agus (Maranao); Ilog Agus (Filipino)

Location
- Country: Philippines
- Region: Northern Mindanao; BARMM
- Province: Lanao del Sur; Lanao del Norte

Physical characteristics
- Source: Lake Lanao
  - location: Lanao del Sur, BARMM
  - coordinates: 7°53′31″N 124°15′09″E
  - elevation: 700 m (2,300 ft)
- Mouth: Iligan Bay
  - location: Iligan City, Northern Mindanao
  - coordinates: 8°11′50″N 124°11′21″E
  - elevation: 0 m (0 ft)
- Length: 36.5 km (22.7 mi)
- Basin size: 1,645 km^{2} (635 sq mi)
- Discharge
  - location: Iligan Bay
  - average: 10 m^{3}/s (350 cu ft/s)

The Agus River is a river that flows for 36.5 kilometres (22.7 mi) from Lake Lanao to Iligan Bay, Philippines. It cuts through the provinces of Lanao del Sur and Lanao del Norte. Settlements along the banks of the river include the city of Marawi, the municipality of Linamon, and the city of Iligan. It separates into two channels as it drains to Iligan Bay; one goes over the Maria Cristina Falls, while the other supplies the Tinago Falls. The river descends for about 2,200 feet (670 m) from its source as it flows for 21 miles (34 km) before draining to the sea. The river is relatively shallow as it is only 4 feet (1.2 m) deep in some areas. The Agus River's watershed spans about 11,320.00 hectares. It has a discharge of about 10 cubic metres per second (350 cu ft/s) and flows from a narrow depression off the northwestern rim of the lake and flows over a basalt rock formation. The canyon carved by the river suggests a short erosional period.

== Importance to humans ==
The lake and the river are used for both commercial and sport fishing, as well as for recreational activities such as boating and swimming. The river in its entirety, however, is not navigable because the current in some areas reaches a velocity of up to thirty miles an hour. The NAPOCOR's hydroelectric project on the Agus River generates 70% of the electricity used in Mindanao due to the hydroelectric plants in the river and Maria Cristina Falls. However, the hydroelectric plants and the requisite regulatory dams have changed the fluctuations of the water level of Lake Lanao, affecting the indigenous people, and producing conflicts with the local population.

In Maranao mythology, Lake Lanao once threatened to drown the people of Sebangan with its ever-rising waters. The Archangel Gabriel is thought to have made the Agus River to drain the lake.

== Timoga Springs ==
An Agus River tributary provides Timoga Springs with water; the springs is roughly 1 kilometre (0.62 mi) from the Maria Cristina Falls. The water from Timoga Springs runs out to resorts and private swimming pools. The swimming pools are encircled by numerous food booths. The Rough Guides called the Timoga Springs "ice-cold, crystal-clear and non-chlorinated".
