= Dansalan College =

Christian college in Lanao del Sur, Philippines

- Established: 1950
- Founder: Frank Laubach
- Religious affiliation: United Church of Christ in the Philippines
- Location: Marawi, Lanao del Sur, Philippines; 7°59′47″N 124°17′50″E
- Campus: Marawi City, Iligan Branch
- Location in Mindanao Location in the Philippines

Dansalan College is a Protestant-ran college in Marawi, Philippines. The educational institution was founded by missionary, Frank Laubach in 1950.

During the Marawi crisis, the college's main building Laubach Hall was reportedly set on fire by Maute group militants on May 23, 2017. Maute snipers occupied the college. Dansalan College was announced to have been secured by government forces on July 4, 2017.
