= Linamon =

Municipality in Lanao del Norte, Philippines

Linamon Cabili
- Municipality
- Municipality of Linamon
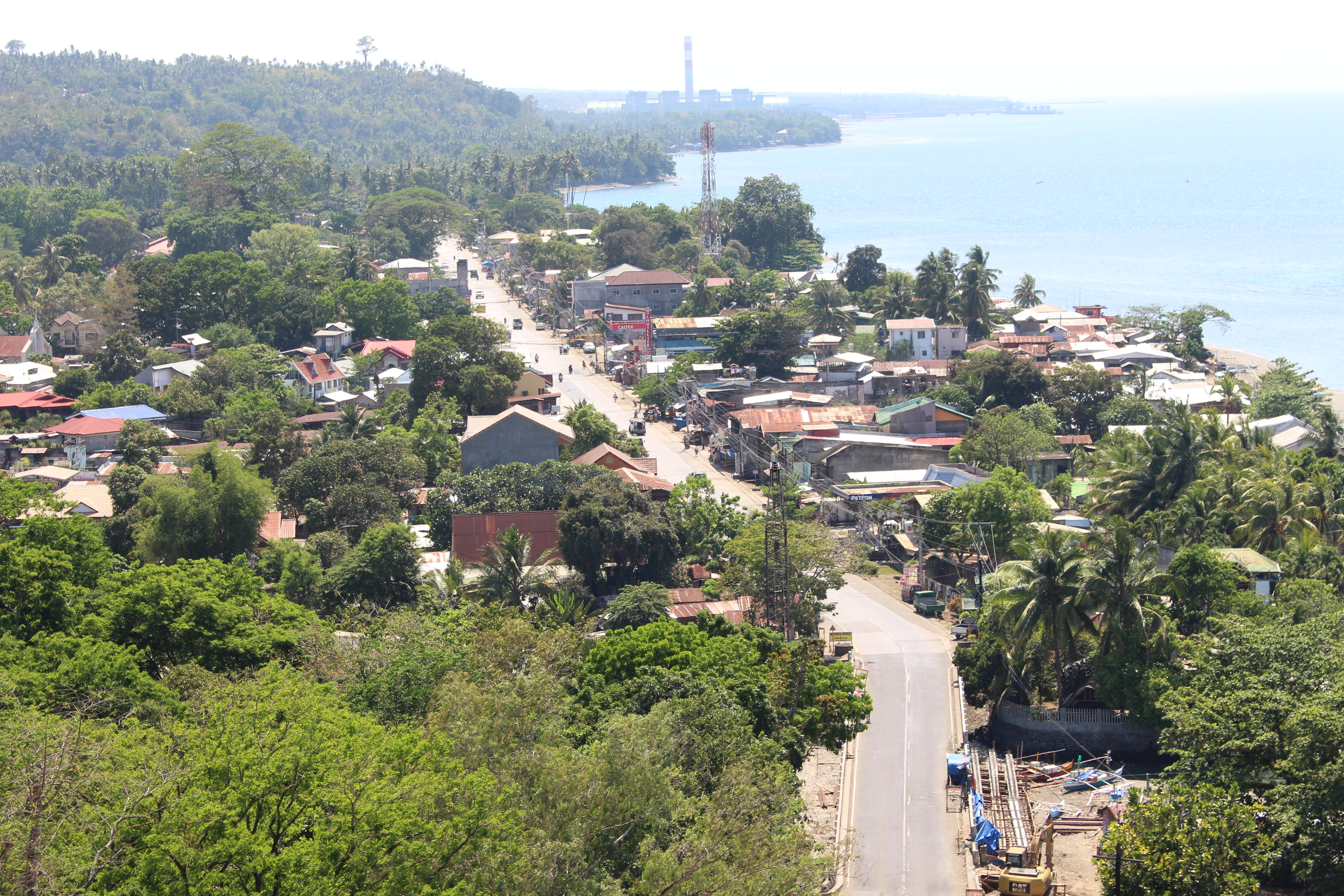
- Downtown area

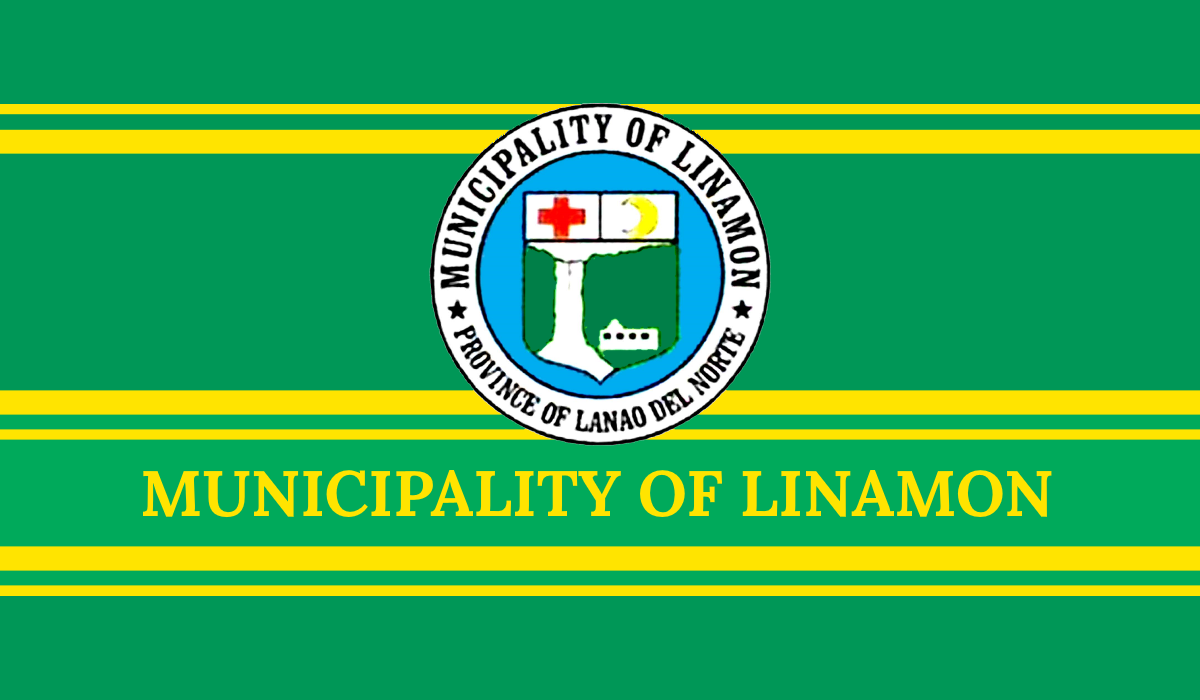
- Flag Seal

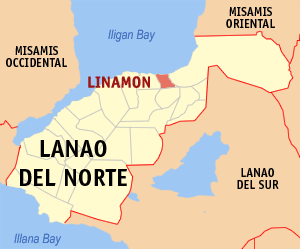
- Map of Lanao del Norte with Linamon highlighted
- Interactive map of Linamon
- Location within the Philippines
- Coordinates: 8°11′05″N 124°09′37″E
- Country: Philippines
- Region: Northern Mindanao
- Province: Lanao del Norte
- District: 1st district
- Founded: January 13, 1960
- Barangays: 8 (see Barangays)

Government
  - Type: Sangguniang Bayan
  - Mayor: Hon.Tata Chang (Lakas-CMD)
  - Vice Mayor: Randy Macapil (Lakas-CMD)
  - Representative: Mohamad Khalid Q. Dimaporo
  - Municipal Council: Members: Procopio V. Chang; Gilbert B. Lacida Jr.; Edna L. Chan; Randy Y. Macapil III; Edgar C. Openiano; Renato R. Pestolante; Allan A. Baclaan; Nicanor C. Canoy
  - Electorate: 12,551 voters (2025)

Area
  - Total: 76.38 km^{2} (29.49 sq mi)
- Elevation: 92 m (302 ft)
- Highest elevation: 363 m (1,191 ft)
- Lowest elevation: 0 m (0 ft)

Population (2024 census)
  - Total: 21,385
  - Density: 280.0/km^{2} (725.1/sq mi)
  - Households: 5,268

Economy
  - Income class: 4th municipal income class
  - Poverty incidence: 26.5% (2023)
  - Revenue: ₱ 134.6 million (2024)
  - Assets: ₱ 290.6 million (2024)
  - Expenditure: ₱ 122.2 million (2024)
  - Liabilities: ₱ 48.04 million (2024)

Service provider
  - Electricity: Lanao del Norte Electric Cooperative (LANECO)
- Time zone: UTC+8 (PST)
- ZIP code: 9201
- PSGC: 1003510000
- IDD : area code: +63 (0)63
- Native languages: Maranao; Cebuano; Binukid; Tagalog
- Website: www.linlanor.gov.ph

Linamon, officially the Municipality of Linamon (Maranao: Inged a Linamon; Cebuano: Lungsod sa Linamon; Tagalog: Bayan ng Linamon), is a municipality in the province of Lanao del Norte, Philippines. According to the 2024 census, it has a population of 21,385 people.

Historically, Linamon was a barangay in Iligan City until it became a separate municipality on January 13, 1960.

== History ==
Before the Spanish and American invasions, the majority of the people living in Linamon were Bisaya.

Under the National Land Settlement Administration (NLSA) of the Commonwealth Government, there was a Philippine House of Representatives proposal to utilize some of the land in Mindanao to help the Philippine Government. The settlers that were sent for this project were composed of people from the Islands of Visayas and Island Luzon. The first settlers were sent to the following areas:

- Some parts of Zamboanga
- Misamis Occidental
- Lanao del Norte
- Misamis Oriental
- Some parts of Surigao
- Some parts of Davao
- Some parts of Cotabato

In Lanao del Norte, the transport of settlers was successful due to the smooth negotiations with the Maranao tribal leaders and land lords. As a sign of welcoming, the land lords donated some of their land to the settlers. Resulting intermarriages between settlers and tribes led to the majority of those living in Lanao del Norte and Misamis Occidental having blood in the Maranao tribe.

When martial law was implemented, the settlement experienced conflict between Muslims and non-Muslims.

== Geography ==
Tinago Falls

Linamon is the east of Lanao del Norte, located about 11.5 kilometres (7.1 mi) south-west of Iligan. It is bounded in the east by the Linamon River, the Larapan River and the municipality of Kauswagan in the west, the municipality of Matungao in the south, and Iligan Bay in the north.

=== Barangays ===
Linamon is politically subdivided into 8 barangays. Each barangay consists of puroks, while some have sitios.

- Busque
- Larapan
- Magoong
- Napo
- Poblacion
- Purakan
- Robocon
- Samburon

=== Climate ===
Climate data for Linamon, Lanao del Norte
Month	Jan	Feb	Mar	Apr	May	Jun	Jul	Aug	Sep	Oct	Nov	Dec	Year
Mean daily maximum °C (°F)	29 (84)	29 (84)	30 (86)	31 (88)	30 (86)	30 (86)	30 (86)	30 (86)	30 (86)	30 (86)	30 (86)	29 (84)	30 (86)
Mean daily minimum °C (°F)	24 (75)	24 (75)	24 (75)	25 (77)	26 (79)	26 (79)	25 (77)	25 (77)	25 (77)	25 (77)	25 (77)	25 (77)	25 (77)
Average precipitation mm (inches)	159 (6.3)	143 (5.6)	166 (6.5)	183 (7.2)	357 (14.1)	414 (16.3)	333 (13.1)	309 (12.2)	289 (11.4)	285 (11.2)	253 (10.0)	166 (6.5)	3,057 (120.4)
Average rainy days	18.4	17.2	20.6	23.4	29.3	29.2	29.9	29.4	27.7	28.7	25.5	19.9	299.2
Source: Meteoblue

== Demographics ==
Population census of Linamon
Year	Pop.	±% p.a.
1960	7,389	—
1970	8,822	+1.79%
1975	7,299	−3.73%
1980	9,502	+5.41%
1990	13,449	+3.54%
1995	14,529	+1.46%
2000	14,959	+0.63%
2007	16,340	+1.23%
2010	17,484	+2.49%
2015	20,341	+2.92%
2020	21,269	+0.94%
2024	21,385	+0.13%
Source: Philippine Statistics Authority

== Economy ==
Poverty incidence of Linamon (%)

Source: Philippine Statistics Authority

== Tourism ==
The Tinago Falls, a waterfall on the Agus River at the village of Robocon, is one of the two outlets of Lake Lanao. It is "the main tourist attraction of the province".

Linamon is a coastal town of Lanao del Norte, where five of its eight barangays are situated along the Iligan Bay area, and is considered the “Beach Capital of Lanao del Norte”, with beaches spanning from Barangay Poblacion to Barangay Samburon. The area has 16 established beach resorts.

== Government ==
The mayors after the People Power Revolution 1986 are:

- 1986–1987, Teofilo T. Macapil
- 1986 - 1992, Pedrinilo Amesola
- 1992 - 2001, Alejandro Canoy-Alfeche
- 2001 - 2007, Cherlito Macas
- 2007 - 2016, Noel N. Deaño
- 2016–present, Randy J. Macapil
