= Sacred Mountain National Park =

Protected area in Lanao del Sur, Philippines

- IUCN category V (protected landscape/seascape)
- Location within Mindanao mainland Location within Philippines
- Location: Lanao del Sur, Philippines
- Nearest city: Marawi
- Coordinates: 8°1′14.7″N 124°17′52.7″E
- Area: 94 hectares (230 acres)
- Established: August 5, 1965
- Governing body: Department of Environment and Natural Resources

Sacred Mountain National Park is a national park in Marawi, Lanao del Sur in the Southern Philippines. The mountain area has an indigenous local name, but lingering colonial influence in the 1960's was still strong during the early years of the republic, leading to the national government into naming the park as "sacred mountain" instead of its local name. Some locals have called for the national park's renaming, to reflect the indigenous identity of the locality. The 94-hectare (230-acre) national park and protected area, located in Brgys. Guimba and Papandayan, was established on August 5, 1965, by Republic Act no. 4190. The main geographic feature of the park is Mount Mupo which has the height of 274.32-meter (900.0 ft). Activities in the park include birdwatching and trekking to the mountaintop where a pond is located.

Buyo Buyo (Piper abbreviatum) plants dominate and non-native flora in the park include African tulip trees.

== See also ==
- List of national parks of the Philippines
