= Lists of separatist movements =

Below are the articles listing separatist movements by continent:

== Active separatist movements ==
- List of active separatist movements in Africa
- List of active separatist movements in Asia
- List of active separatist movements in Europe
- List of active separatist movements in North America
- List of active separatist movements in Oceania
- List of active separatist movements in South America

== Historical separatist movements ==
- List of historical separatist movements in Africa
- List of historical separatist movements in Asia
- List of historical separatist movements in Europe
- List of historical separatist movements in North America
- List of historical separatist movements in Oceania
- List of historical separatist movements in South America

== See also ==
- United Nations list of non-self-governing territories
- European Free Alliance, political forum that consists of various regionalist, separatist and ethnic minority political parties in Europe
- Free Nations of Post-Russia Forum, political forum that consists of various regionalist, separatist and ethnic minority political parties in Russia
- Unrepresented Nations and Peoples Organization
- Political parties of minorities
  - List of regional and minority parties in Europe
  - List of minority political parties
- Separatism
  - List of active separatist movements recognized by intergovernmental organizations
  - List of political parties campaigning for self-government
- List of active rebel groups
  - List of rebel groups that control territory
- Independence
  - Self determination
  - Unilateral declaration of independence
  - List of states with limited recognition
- Secession
  - List of states with limited recognition
  - List of stateless societies
  - Independence referendum
  - War of independence
  - Wars of national liberation
- Autonomism
  - Autonomous administrative division
  - List of autonomous areas by country
  - Regionalism
  - Dependent territory
  - Associated state
- Irredentism
  - List of irredentist claims or disputes
- Micronations
  - List of micronations
- Stateless society
- Stateless nation
