= Marawi =

Capital city of Lanao del Sur, Philippines

Marawi مراوى Dansalan
- Component city
- Islamic City of Marawi
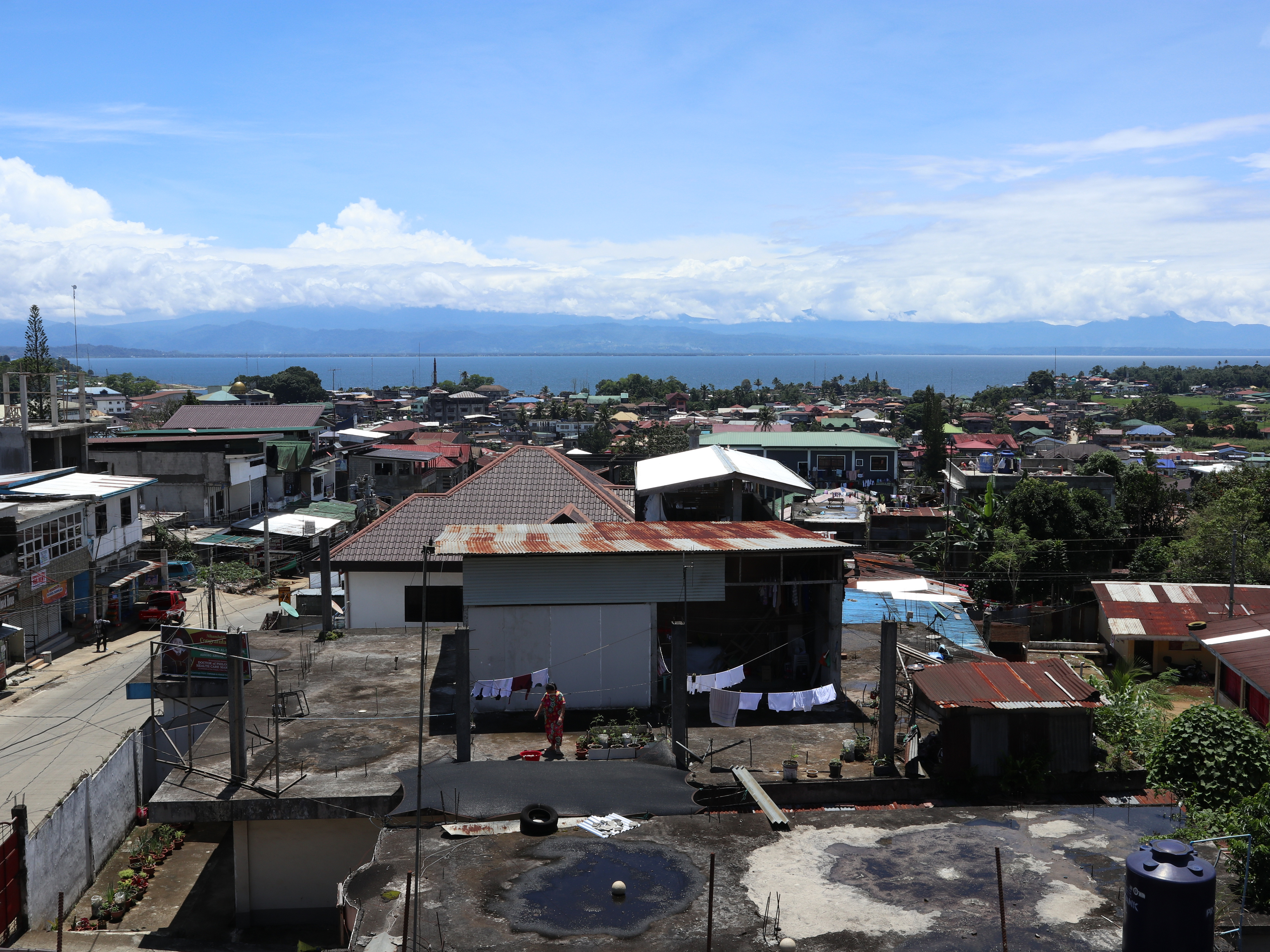
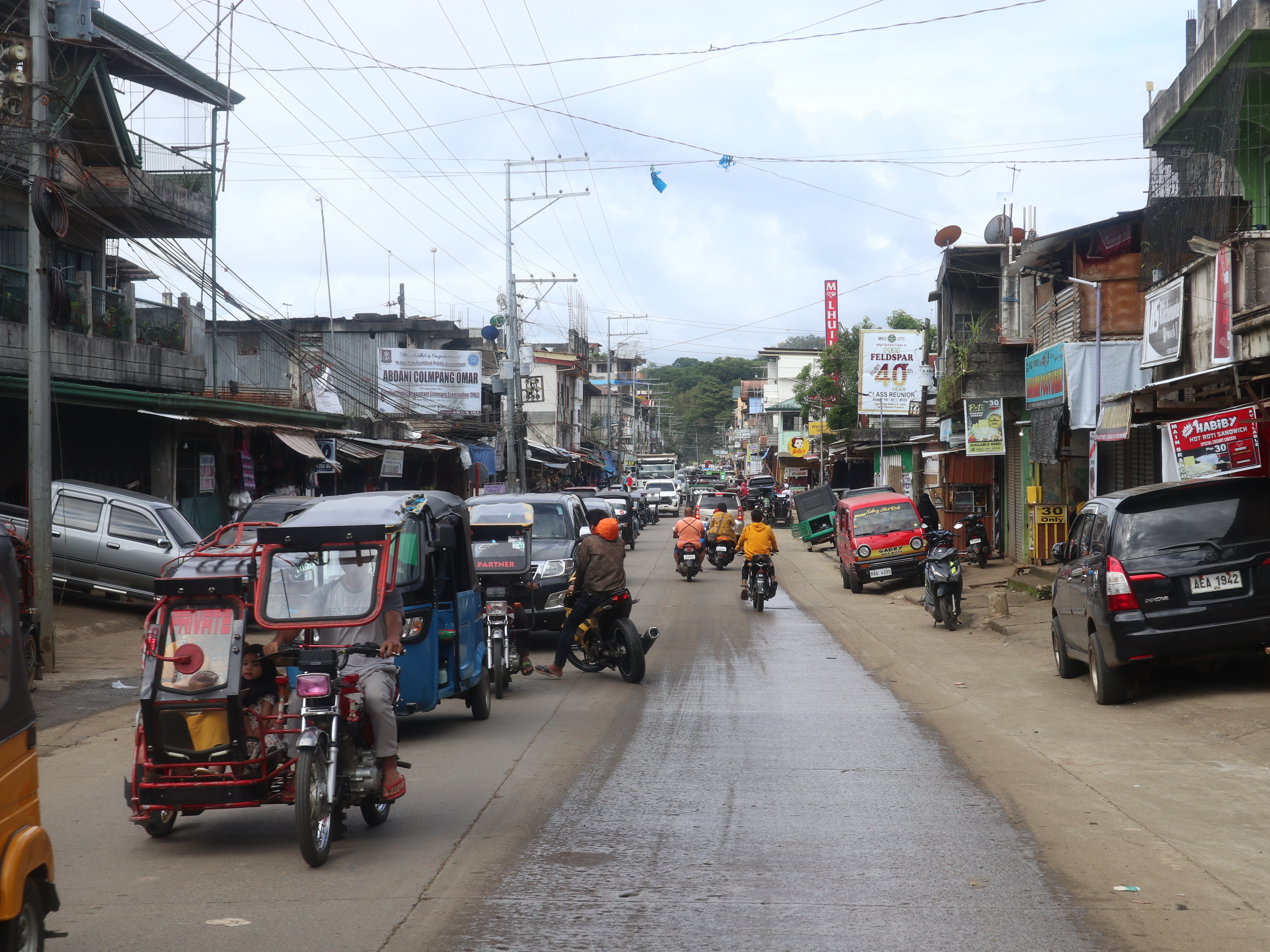
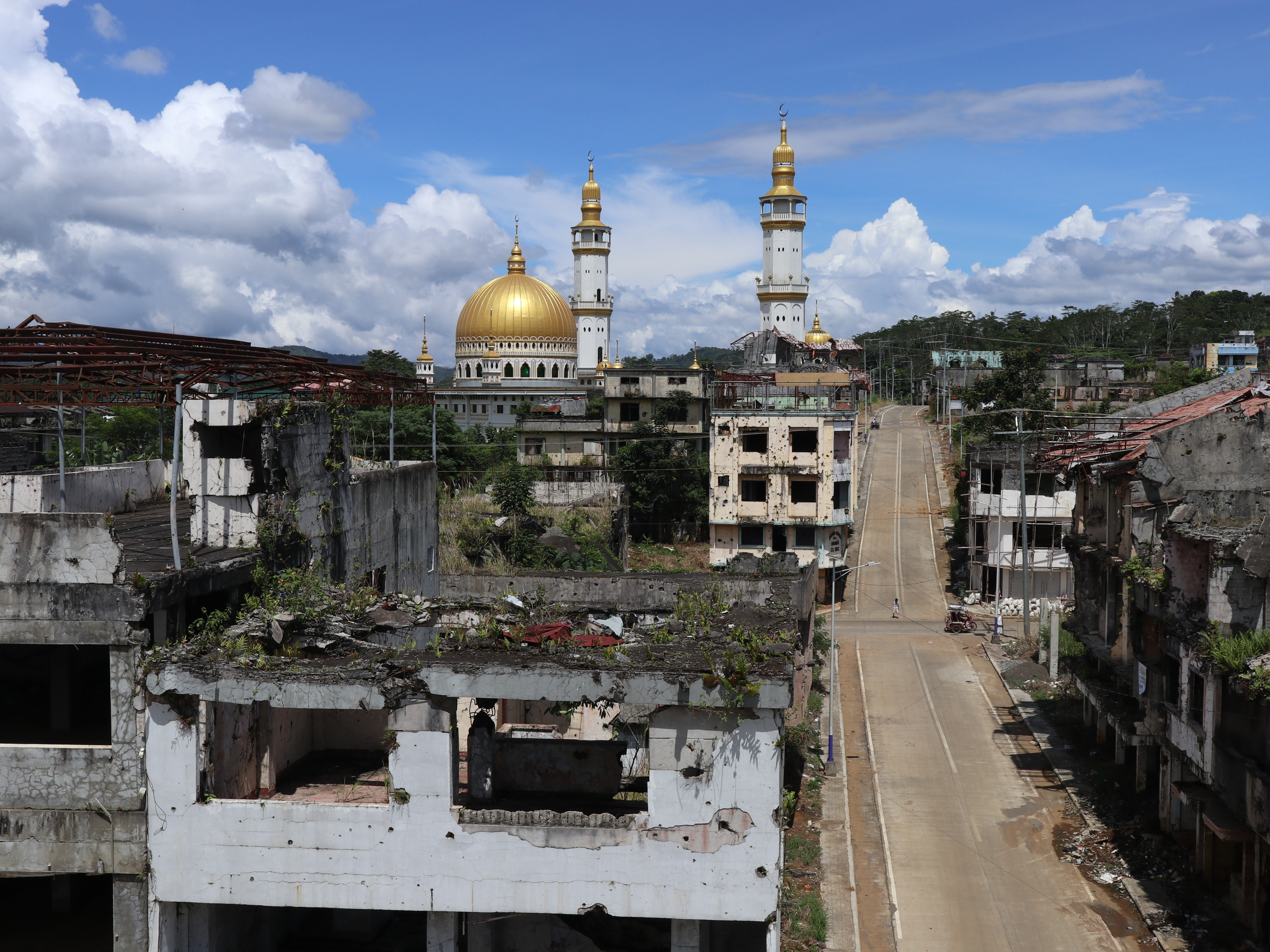
- Skyline Lanao del Sur Provincial Capitol Mindanao State University City Proper Ground Zero

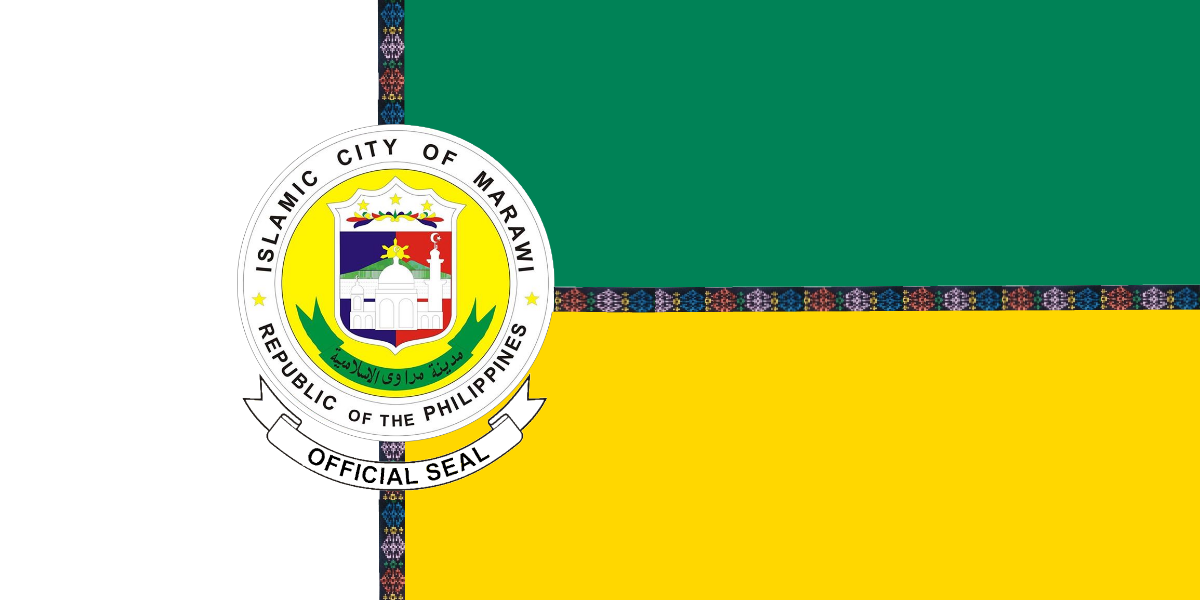
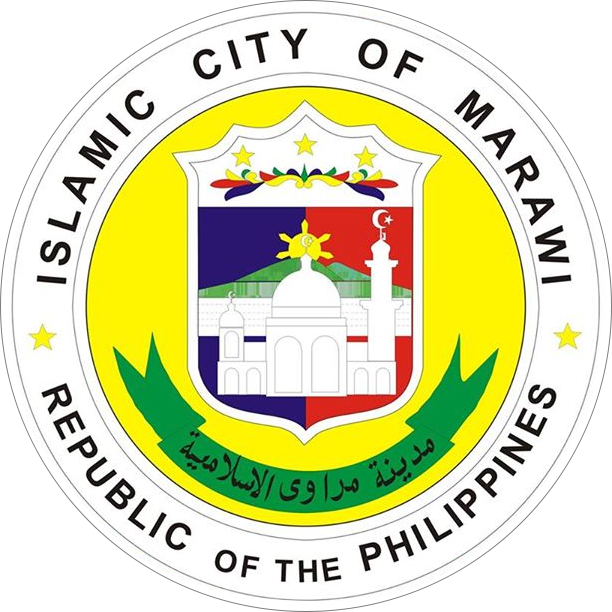
- Flag Seal
- Nickname: "Summer Capital of the South"
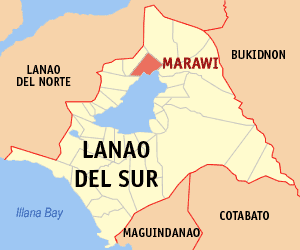
- Map of Lanao del Sur with Marawi highlighted
- Interactive map of Marawi
- Location within the Philippines
- Coordinates: 8°00′11″N 124°17′06″E
- Country: Philippines
- Region: Bangsamoro Autonomous Region in Muslim Mindanao
- Province: Lanao del Sur
- House district: 1st district
- Parliamentary district: 1st district
- Settled: 1639
- Chartered: May 24, 1907
- Cityhood: August 19, 1940
- Renamed: June 16, 1956
- Barangays: 96 (see Barangays)

Government
  - Type: Sangguniang Panlungsod
  - Mayor: Shariff Zain L. Gandamra (Lakas–CMD)
  - Vice Mayor: Majul U. Gandamra (Lakas–CMD)
  - House Representative: Ziaur-Rahman A. Adiong (Lakas–CMD)
  - City Council: Members: Mohammad Shaquille L. Gandamra; Sajid D. Munder; Lailyn M. Dimal; Borgie B. Dalidig; Sultan Jawar R. Domato; Nasrollah M. Basman; Sihawi A. Lala, Sr.; Mohammad Khalid M. Salic; Ozamah D. Macabangon; Jackie S. Mangondato
  - Electorate: 79,288 voters (2025)

Area
  - Total: 87.55 km^{2} (33.80 sq mi)
- Elevation: 710 m (2,330 ft)
- Highest elevation: 1,852 m (6,076 ft)
- Lowest elevation: 19 m (62 ft)

Population (2024 census)
  - Total: 259,993
  - Density: 2,970/km^{2} (7,691/sq mi)
  - Households: 30,839

Economy
  - Income class: 3rd city income class
  - Poverty incidence: 17.08% (2023)
  - Revenue: ₱ 1,091 million (2024)
  - Assets: ₱ 5,306 million (2024)
  - Expenditure: ₱ 995.5 million (2024)
  - Liabilities: ₱ 1,711 million (2024)

Service provider
  - Electricity: Lanao del Sur Electric Cooperative (LASURECO)
  - Water: Marawi City Water District (MCWD)
  - Telecommunications: PLDT, Smart Telecom, Globe Telecom, Marawi Connect powered by DITO
  - Cable TV: Ranao Radio Broadcasting and TV System Corporation
  - Television: PTV Marawi Regional Center with Studio & News Broadcasting Center
- Time zone: UTC+08:00 (PST)
- ZIP code: 9700
- PSGC: 153617000
- IDD : area code: +63 (0)63
- Native languages: Maranao; Tagalog
- Major religions: Islam

Marawi, officially the Islamic City of Marawi (Maranao: Bandar a Marawi; Filipino: Lungsod ng Marawi; Jawi (Batang Arab): مدينة مراوى الإسلامية), is a component city and capital of the province of Lanao del Sur, Philippines. According to the 2024 census, it has a population of 259,993 people.

Marawi is located upon the shores of Lake Lanao and it is the most populous LGU in Lanao del Sur. It is primarily inhabited by the Maranao people. The city is also called the "Summer Capital of the South" due to its higher elevation and cooler climate, a nickname it shares with Malaybalay. On May 23, 2017, the city suffered extensive damage during the Siege of Marawi as militants affiliated with the Islamic State invaded the city and engaged in a five-month urban warfare, until Defense Secretary Delfin Lorenzana announced the ending of the battle in October.

== Etymology ==
Dansalan (Marawi's prior name) derived from the Mëranaw word "dansal", which means rendezvous; literally, it also means arrival (in other source, "where the waves come to shore"). Being known as the destination point for arriving boats, the place refers to a port, hence, the "Place of Destination and Purpose."

Meanwhile, Marawi is derived from the word "rawi", which means reclining, in reference to Agus River. On the other hand, this present name is in honor of the city's martyred hero in Kuta Marahui (Fortress of Marawi) in 1895.

== History ==
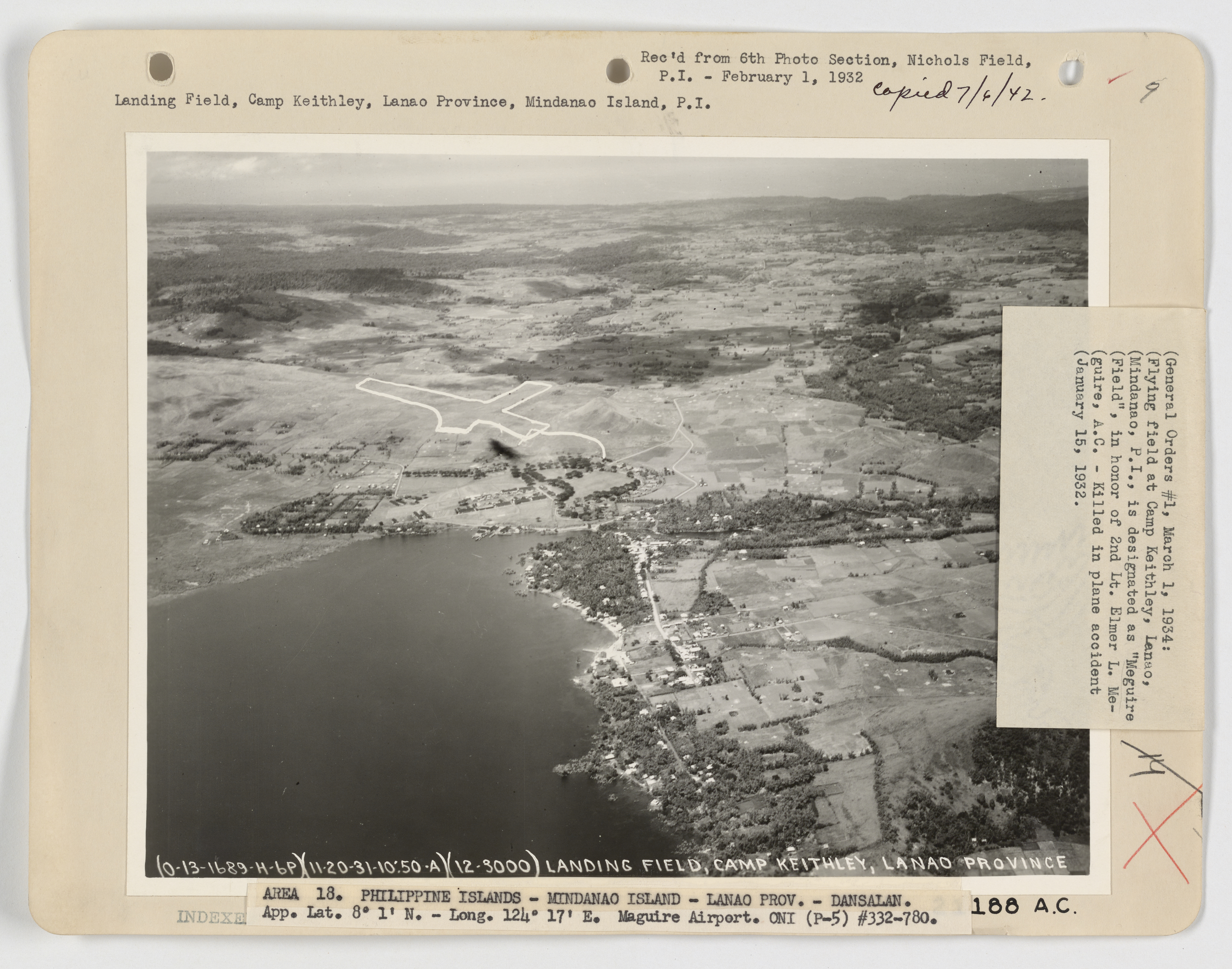
Aerial view of Dansalan, 1932

=== As Dansalan ===
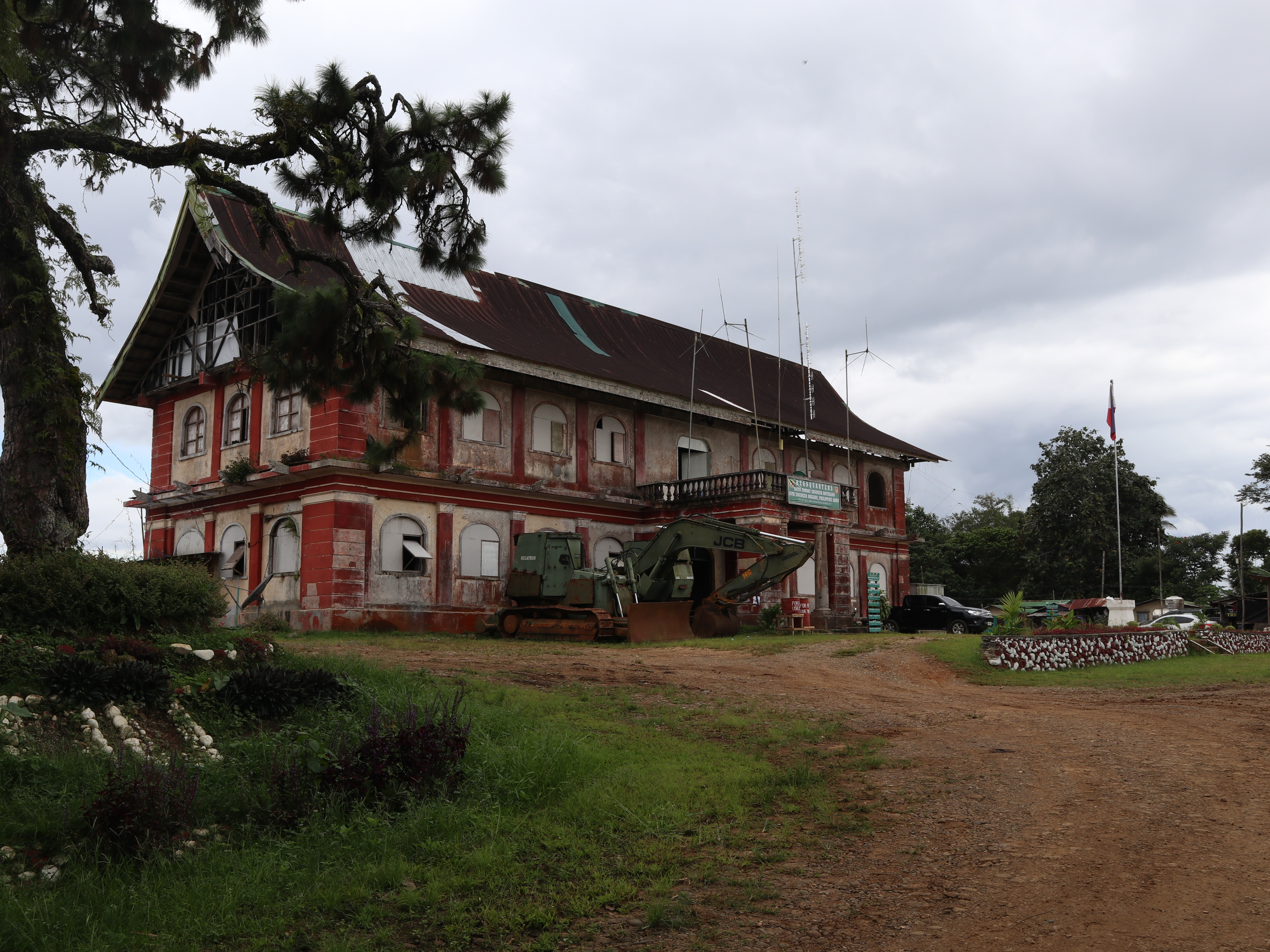
Old Marawi municipal hall

Dansalan began as a port. A sovereign of Marawi before 1639 was "Datu Buadi Sa Kayo" who imposed taxation.

Around the original Meranaw fortification, Spanish captain Francisco Atienza founded a settlement called Dansalan in October 1639. His forces had come from Iligan and were attempting to conquer the entire Lake Lanao area. However, it was abandoned later the same year when thousands of Meranaw soldiers invested the then-fortifying settlement, pressing the Spaniards hard and thus they returned to Iligan, having failed in their quest.

The Spaniards only returned to the area when they began the conquest of the Sultanate of Maguindanao in the 19th century. They made attempts to capture Marawi, a Maranao stronghold, twice until they succeeded in 1895 with the deaths of Datu Amai Pakpak and Datu Sinal. They abandoned the place again upon the arrival of the Americans in the Mindanao in 1898.

Dansalan was created as a municipality by the Moro Province legislative council on May 24, 1907; served as the capital of the undivided Lanao Province since its declaration by the American colonial government.

It was in this municipality when, on March 18, 1935, a group of 189 Maranao leaders and its leader, Hadji Abdulhamid Bongabong of Unayan, signed a document known as the Dansalan Declaration, urging then United States President Franklin Roosevelt and its Congress to grant Mindanao and Sulu separate independence by the United States instead of inclusion in the country's independence.

=== Cityhood and renaming into Marawi ===
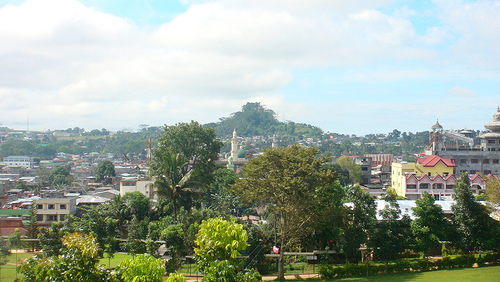
Skyline of Marawi in 2008

Dansalan was the last to become a chartered city under the country's Commonwealth era with the approval of Commonwealth Act No. 592 on August 19, 1940. During World War II, the Japanese invaded Dansalan and established a "comfort station" in the city, where local girls, teenagers, and young adults were kidnapped and turned into sex slaves under brutal "comfort women" system, where victims were routinely gang-raped and killed by Japanese soldiers. After the Second World War, inauguration took place on September 30, 1950. It was renamed Marawi City on June 16, 1956 through Republic Act (RA) No. 1552 which amended the charter.

Upon division of Lanao province through RA No. 2228 in 1959, it was made capital of Lanao del Sur.

The city, being the country's only predominantly Muslim chartered city, was declared "Islamic City of Marawi" through City Council Resolution No. 19-A on April 15, 1980. This was proposed by Parliamentary Bill No. 261 in the defunct Batasang Pambansa, the country's former parliament during the Marcos regime, reportedly to attract funds from the Middle East.

=== Siege of Marawi ===
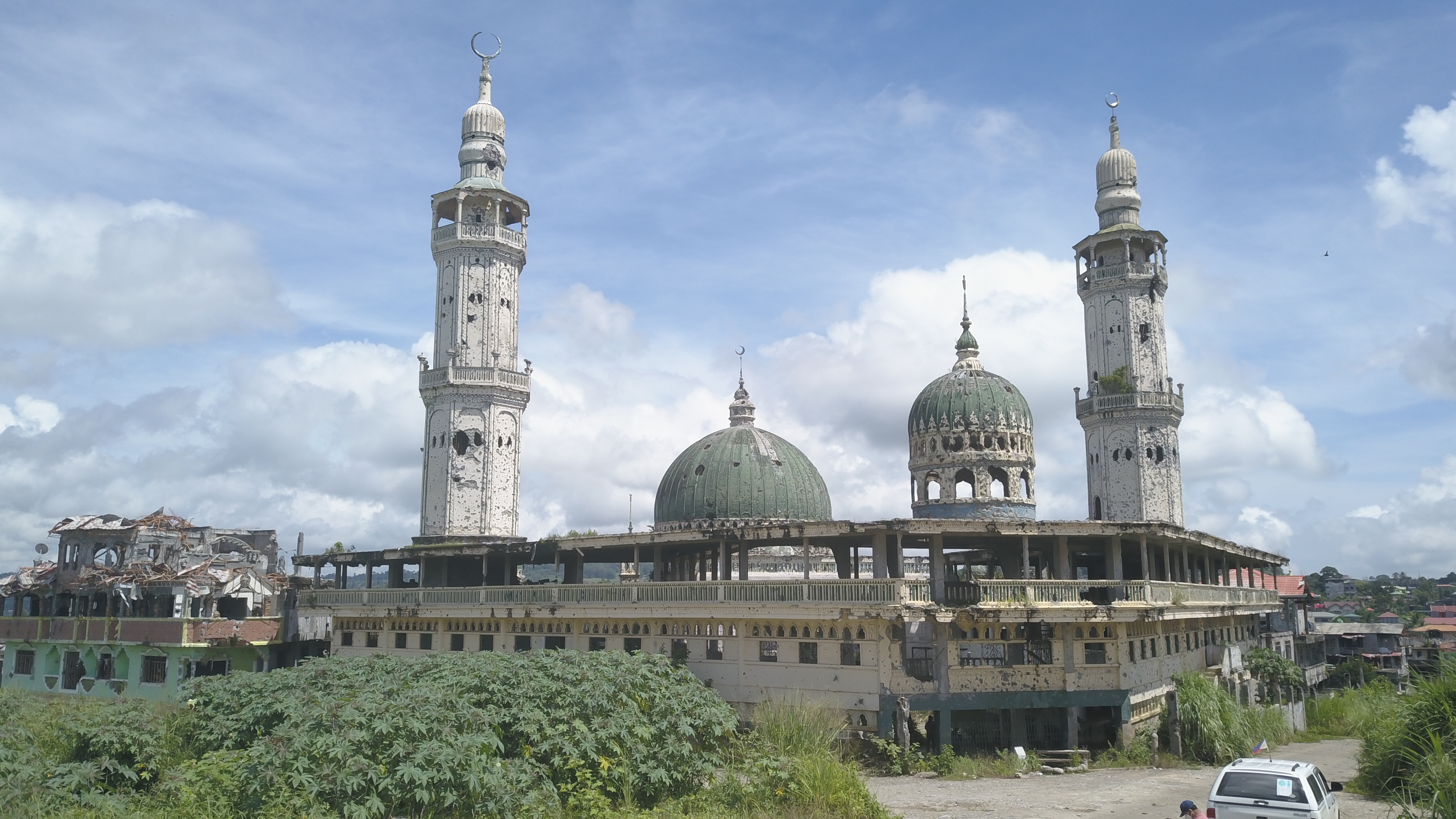
The Marawi Grand Mosque after the 2017 siege, pictured in 2020.

On May 23, 2017, a pro–Islamic State of Iraq and the Levant group called the Maute group attacked the city. The Battle of Marawi—also known as the Marawi siege, the Marawi clash, and the Marawi crisis—started on May 23. CNN Philippines reported that the militants had over 500 men. Philippine President Rodrigo Duterte declared martial law on the island of Mindanao, where the fighting was taking place, initially until December 31, 2017, but was later extended to the end of 2018 and then again to the end of 2019. The city was liberated from militant control on October 17, 2017 and battle operations officially ended on October 23, 2017.

==== Post-battle period ====
On January 30, 2018, it was announced that a 10-hectare military base will be established in the city to prevent the reentry of terrorists.

==== Creation of additional barangays ====
The 2017 siege resulted to internally displaced persons contributing to a significant population increase in certain barangays, later led to the creation of new ones. Since then, the Commission on Elections (COMELEC) held two separate plebiscites in the city, eventually establishing five barangays.

Results of plebiscites for the creation of barangays, 2023–2024
Proposed barangay	Mother barangay	Choice				Total votes	Turnout (%)	Registered voters
Proposed barangay	Mother barangay	Yes		No		Total votes	Turnout (%)	Registered voters
Proposed barangay	Mother barangay	Votes	%	Votes	%	Total votes	Turnout (%)	Registered voters
2023 plebiscite (City Ordinances 07-10 and 05-10, series of 2022)
Boganga II	Boganga	948	99.79%	2	0.21%	950	95.77%	992
Datu Dalidigan	Sagonsongan	473	99.37%	3	0.63%	476	99.17%	480
2024 plebiscite (City Ordinances 20-11, 18-11, and 19-11, series of 2023)
Angoyao	Patani	1,137	99.82%	2	0.18%	1,139	92.23%	1,235
Sultan Corobong	Dulay Proper	387	100%	0	0%	387	97.97%	395
Sultan Panoroganan	Kilala	597	100%	0	0%	597	94.02%	635
Sources: COMELEC, via Rappler and Inquirer.net.

The plebiscite for the creation of two barangays on March 18, 2023, marking the first exclusively local electoral exercise in the city post-siege, was held in five polling precincts. With 96.88% of registered voters participated, majority of them later ratified the proposal. The creation became effective, months prior to the Barangay and Sangguniang Kabataan elections in October.

Another plebiscite, seeking for the creation of three additional barangays, was held on March 9, 2024, in eight clustered precincts. With 93.73% voter turnout, the proposal was ratified, almost unanimously.

== Geography ==
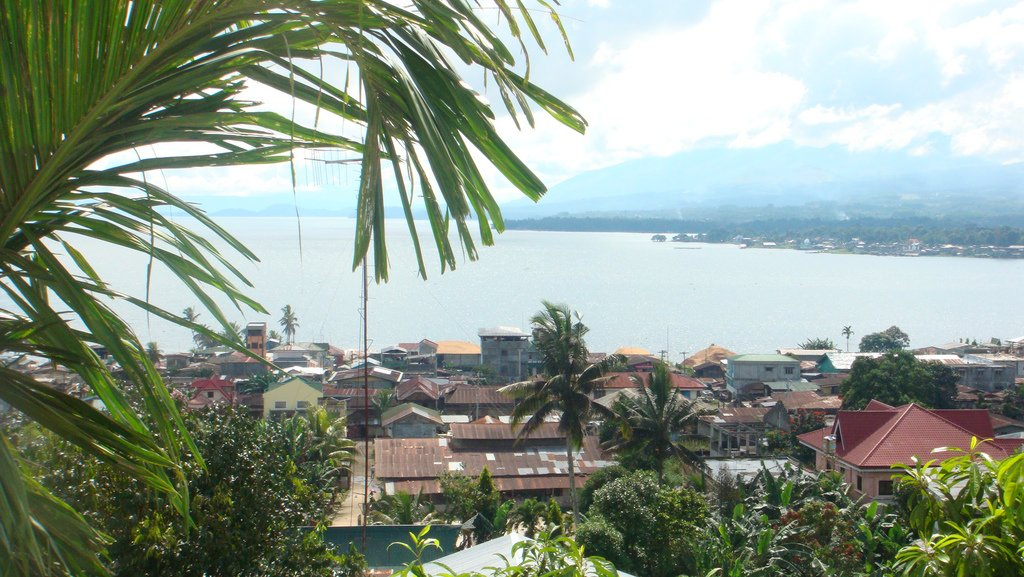
Lake Lanao viewed from Marawi

Marawi has a total land area of 8,755 hectares (21,630 acres). It is located on the northernmost shores of Lake Lanao and straddles the area where the Agus River starts. It is bounded to the north by the municipalities of Kapai and Saguiaran; to the south by Lake Lanao; to the east by the municipalities of Bubong and Ditsaan-Ramain; and to the west by the municipalities of Marantao and Saguiaran. The Bagang beach is situated 2 kilometers (1.2 mi) from the city's commercial center.

The Muslim majority city also hosts a national park, the Sacred Mountain National Park, which spans the barangays of Guimba and Papandayan covering an area of 94-hectare (230-acre). The protected area was established on August 5, 1965, by Republic Act no. 4190. The park is dominated by Mount Mupo, a 900-foot (270 m) tall extinct volcanic cone. The park is ideal for birdwatching and mountain climbing to the summit that features a small pond.

=== Topography ===
Mountains, rolling hills, valleys, and a large placid lake dominate the city's landscape. Angoyao Hills (Barangay Sogod) served as natural viewpoint over the water of the Lake Lanao. Signal Hill (Barangay Matampay), Arumpac Hill (Barangay Saduc), and Mt. Mupo (Barangay Guimba) are considered beautiful but mysterious. Mt. Mupo, located within the Sacred Mountain National Park, is known for its untouched trees and beautiful, perfect cone.

=== Barangays ===
Marawi is politically subdivided into 101 barangays. Each barangay consists of puroks while some have sitios.

- Ambolong
- Amito Marantao
- Angoyao
- Bacolod Chico Proper
- Basak Malutlut
- Banga
- Bacong
- Banggolo Poblacion
- Bangon
- Beyaba-Damag
- Bito Buadi Itowa
- Bito Buadi Parba
- Buadi Sacayo (Green)
- Bubonga Pagalamatan
- Bubonga Lilod Madaya
- Boganga
- Boganga II
- Boto Ambolong
- Bubonga Cadayonan
- Bubong Lumbac
- Bubonga Marawi
- Bubonga Punod
- Cabasaran
- Cabingan
- Cadayonan
- Cadayonan II
- Calocan East
- Calocan West
- Daguduban
- Dansalan
- Datu Dalidigan
- Datu Naga
- Datu Saber (Navarro)
- Datu Sa Dansalan
- Dayawan
- Dimaluna
- Dulay Proper
- Dulay West
- East Basak
- Emie Punud
- Fort
- Gadongan
- Gadongan Mapantao
- Guimba (Lilod Proper)
- Kapantaran
- Kilala
- Kormatan Matampay
- Lilod Madaya (Poblacion)
- Lilod Saduc
- Lomidong
- Lumbaca Madaya (Poblacion)
- Lumbac Marinaut
- Lumbaca Toros
- Malimono
- Marawi Poblacion
- Marinaut East
- Marinaut West
- Matampay
- Mipaga Proper
- Moncado Colony
- Moncado Kadingilan
- Moriatao Loksadato
- Norhaya Village
- Olowa Ambolong
- Pagalamatan Gambai
- Pagayawan
- Panggao Saduc
- Pantaon (Langcaf)
- Papandayan
- Papandayan Caniogan
- Paridi
- Patani
- Pindolonan
- Poona Marantao
- Puga-an
- Rapasun MSU
- Raya Madaya I
- Raya Madaya II
- Raya Saduc
- Rorogagus East
- Rorogagus Proper
- Sabala Manao
- Sabala Manao Proper
- Saduc Proper
- Sagonsongan
- Sangcay Dansalan
- Somiorang
- South Madaya Proper
- Sugod Proper
- Sultan Corobong
- Sultan Panoroganan
- Tampilong
- Timbangalan
- Tuca Ambolong
- Tolali
- Toros
- Tuca
- Tuca Marinaut
- Tongantongan-Tuca Timbangalan
- Wawalayan Calocan
- Wawalayan Marinaut

=== Climate ===
Climate data for Marawi
Month	Jan	Feb	Mar	Apr	May	Jun	Jul	Aug	Sep	Oct	Nov	Dec	Year
Mean daily maximum °C (°F)	24 (75)	24 (75)	25 (77)	26 (79)	26 (79)	25 (77)	25 (77)	25 (77)	25 (77)	25 (77)	25 (77)	25 (77)	25 (77)
Mean daily minimum °C (°F)	20 (68)	20 (68)	20 (68)	20 (68)	21 (70)	21 (70)	20 (68)	20 (68)	20 (68)	20 (68)	20 (68)	20 (68)	20 (68)
Average precipitation mm (inches)	159 (6.3)	143 (5.6)	166 (6.5)	183 (7.2)	357 (14.1)	414 (16.3)	333 (13.1)	309 (12.2)	289 (11.4)	285 (11.2)	253 (10.0)	166 (6.5)	3,057 (120.4)
Average rainy days	18.4	17.2	20.6	23.4	29.3	29.2	29.9	29.4	27.7	28.7	25.5	19.9	299.2
Source: Meteoblue

Marawi's weather is warm and wet throughout the year. With the elevation along Lake Lanao at around 2,300 feet (700 m), this raised altitude together frequent heavy showers at all seasons, ensures that hot conditions are seldom observed.

== Demographics ==
Population census of Marawi

Year	Pop.	±% p.a.
1918	6,005	—
1939	11,319	+3.06%
1948	19,657	+6.32%
1960	27,049	+2.70%
1970	55,708	+7.48%
1975	63,332	+2.61%
1980	53,812	−3.20%
1990	91,901	+5.50%

Year	Pop.	±% p.a.
1995	114,389	+4.19%
2000	131,090	+2.96%
2007	177,391	+4.26%
2010	187,106	+1.96%
2015	201,785	+1.45%
2020	207,010	+0.54%
2024	259,993	+5.62%

Source: Philippine Statistics Authority

=== Language ===
Maranao or Meranaw is widely spoken in Marawi; however, many local inhabitants can also speak Maguindanaon, Iranun, and/or Tagalog.

=== Religion ===
Religion in Marawi City
Religion	Percent
Islam	99.6%
Christianity	0.4%

Marawi is predominantly a Muslim city, with Muslims accounting for 99.6% of the population.

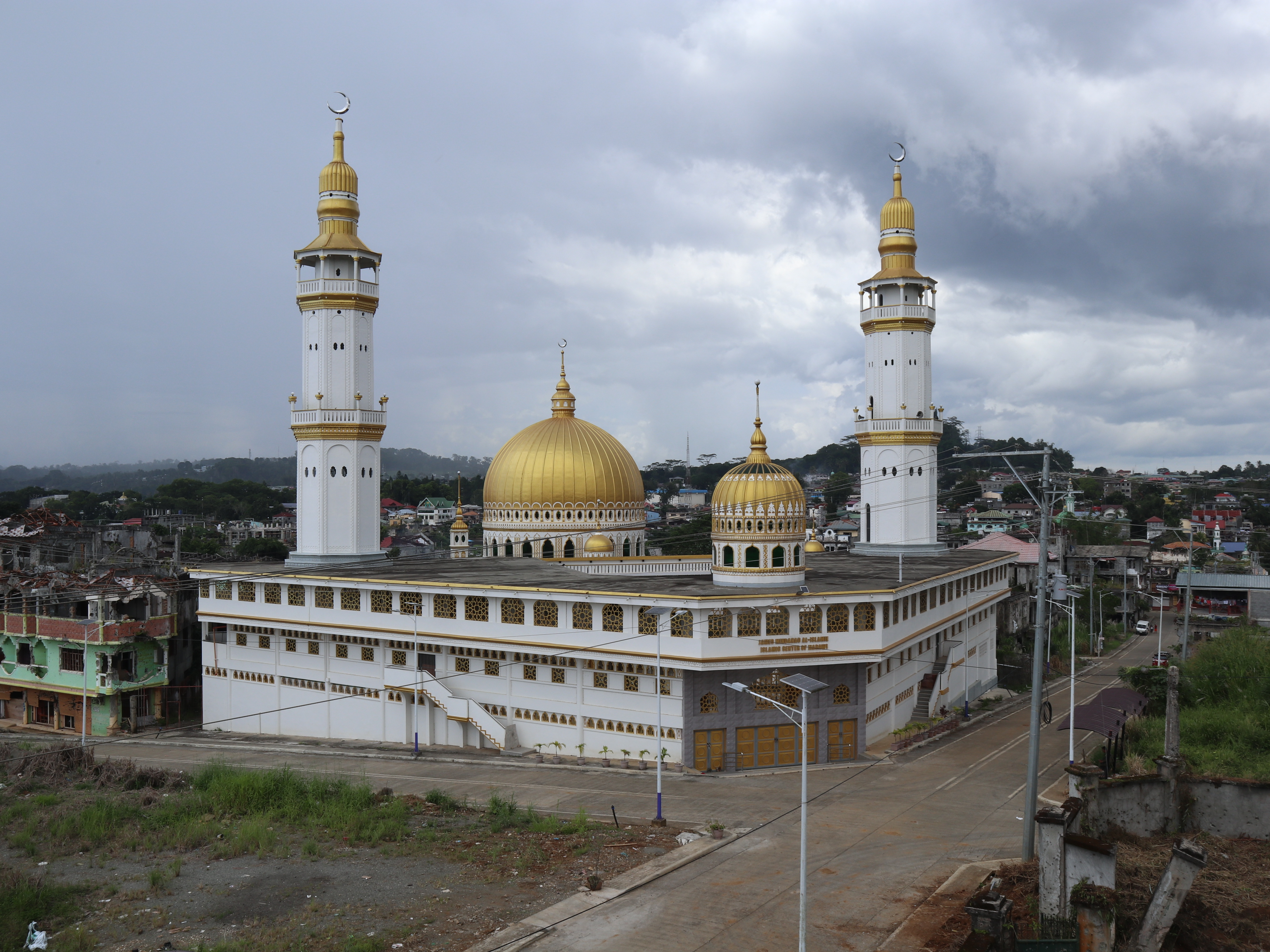
Marawi Grand Mosque

Dansalan Bato Mosque

== Economy ==
Poverty Incidence of Marawi

Source: Philippine Statistics Authority

The economy of Marawi is largely based on agriculture, trading, and exporting. Most industries in the city are agriculture-oriented. They include rice and corn farming, hollow blocks manufacturing, goldsmithing, and saw milling. Small and cottage-size enterprises are engaged in garment making, mat and malong weaving, wood carving, brassware making, web development, and blacksmithing.

Apart from that, Marawi is home to NPC – Agus 1 Hydro Electric Power Plant and the first of the six cascading Agus Hydro Power Plants.

A new wind and solar energy plant and a new diesel-generated power plant are set to be developed in Saguiaran, Lanao del Sur, by two private firms to provide electricity to Marawi and adjoining areas. The project will cost PHP 2 billion and will generate 10 to 30 megawatts of electricity.

== Culture ==
Marawi Convention Center

Marawi Rizal Park

Sarimanok Sports Stadium

== Architecture ==
The feeling of the unique natural setting of the Maranaos in Marawi is manifested by the presence of many large Torogans, an antique royal high-roofed houses with carvings designed by the Meranau, and the Sambitory Old Building in Barrio Naga in front of Tuaka Laput, Marawi.

== Government ==
Marawi City Hall

List of Mayors

- 1938–1940, Berua Alonto
- 1940–1946, Riga Mambuay
- 1946–1947, Natangcop Indol
- 1948–1953, Bato Rudioman Ali, Sr.
- 1953–1954, Disomedig Dianalan
- 1954–1957, Cosain Naga
- 1957–1967, Macapado Batara
- 1968–1984, Omar Maruhom Dianalan
- 1984–1985, Mahadi Pagariongan Pimping
- 1985–1986, Salam Naga Pangadapun
- 1986–1987, Abbas Maruhom Basman
- 1987–1988, Gulam Indol Dianalan
- 1988–1992, Mahid Miraato Mutilan
- 1992–1998, Abbas Maruhom Basman
- 1998–2001, Omel Pesigue Macabando-Basman
- 2001–2007, Omar Solitario Ali
- 2007–2016, Fahad Panarigan Umpar Salic
- 2016–2025, Majul Usman Gandamra
- 2025–present, Shariff Zain Lanto Gandamra

List of Vice Mayors

- 1938–1940, Riga Mambuay
- 1940–1946, Ditucalan Bibitan Guro
- 1954–1957, Corobong Dalidigan Comadug
- 1957–1967, Esmael Mama Menor
- 1967–1971, Rasid Dimatingcal Sampaco
- 1971–1980, Taha U. Rogong
- 1980–1984, Mahadi Pagariongan Pimping
- 1984–1985, Habib Gundarangin Ali
- 1985–1986, Omar Ali Macabalang
- 1986–1987, Abulkhair Dangcal Alonto
- 1987–1988, Amron S. Taha
- 1988–1992, Ombawa Batuan Madum
- 1992–1995, Imran Abdulhamid
- 1995–1998, Ismael Maruhom Tomawis
- 1998–2004, Yusoph Naga Pangadapun, Jr.
- 2004–2007, Yusoph Kouzbary Salic
- 2007–2013, Noryasmin Ala Blangan-Calandada
- 2013–2019, Arafat Makil Salic
- 2019–2025, Anouar Abedin Abdulraof
- 2025–present, Majul Usman Gandamra

== Education ==
Marawi is home to the main campus of Mindanao State University, the biggest state university in Philippines. Other institutions and colleges are well established in the city and are as follows:

- Mindanao State University – Lanao National College of Arts and Trades (Public)
- Jamiatu Muslim Mindanao (Private)
- Jamiatul Philippine Al-Islamia (Private)
- Mapandi Memorial College (Private)
- Jamiatu Marawi Al-Islamia Foundation (Private)
- Pacasum College (Private)
- Marawi Capitol College Foundation, Inc. (Private)
- Lake Lanao College Inc. (Private)
- Philippine Muslim Teachers' College (Private)
- Marawi Islamic College (Private)
- SMD Foundation Academy (Private)
- Senator Ninoy Aquino College Foundation (Private)
- Lanao Islamic Paramedical College Foundation, Inc. (Private)
- Cali Paramedical College Foundation, Inc. (Private)
- RC-Al Khwarizmi International College Foundation, Inc. (Private)
- Mindanao Islamic Computer College (Private)
- Datu Mala Muslim Mindanao Islamic College (Private)
- Dansalan Polytechnic College (Private)
- Philippine Engineering and Agro-Industrial College, Inc. (Private)
- Lanao Central College, Inc. (Private)
- Khadijah Mohammad Islamic Academy (Private)
- Masiricampo Abantas Memorial Educational Center, Inc. (Private)
- Philippine Integrated College Academy Foundation Inc. (Private)
- Al Bangsamoro Shari'ah and Professional Education College (Private)
- Muslim Mindanao Integrated College Academy, Inc. (Private)
- Mindanao Institute of Healthcare Professionals, Inc. (Private)
- Mindanao Institute of Technology, Inc. (Private)
- Fountain Harvest Islamic Academy (Private)

Other notable secondary schools are:

- Mindanao State University – Institute of Science Education - Science High School (Public)
- Mindanao State University – Integrated Laboratory School (Public)
- Mindanao State University – University Training Center (Public)
- Ibn Siena Integrated School Foundation (Private)
- Hadiyyah International School (Private)
- Dansalan College Foundation Inc. (Private)
- Dhayfullah Islamic Institute, Inc. (Private)
- Philippine Integrated School Foundation, Inc. (Private)
- RC-Al Khwarizmi International College Foundation Inc. – Science Laboratory School (Private)
- Marawi City National High School (Public)
- Dansalan National High School (Public)
- Lake Lanao National High School (Public)
- Batabor National High School (Public)
- Angoyao National High School (Public)
- Aba Al-Khail Computer School (Private)
- International Academy of Marawi (Private)
- Miftahus Sala'am Integrated Academy (Private)
- SMD Foundation Academy – Integrated Science High School (Private)
- Masiricampo Abantas Memorial Islamic and Science Academy (Private)

TESDA is also stationed in Marawi which caters to technical training of students for the province.

Within the Mindanao State University is the Aga Khan Museum of Islamic Arts which is named in honor of Sultan Aga Khan who contributed to the realization of the museum. Historical development of the country is bank on the large space upon the conservation of cultural materials. It has huge, collection of indigenous art, displayed ethnic music tape recorded, the native folk dances from different regions of Mindanao, Sulu and Palawan, the native tools and weapons used by the Muslims and different artistic designs of houses are the main attractions of museum. Indigenous art and cultural material are being displayed.

== Healthcare ==
Public Hospital

- Amai Pakpak Medical Center
- Marawi City General Hospital
- MSU Medical Services and Hospital (University Infirmary)

Private Hospital

- Dr. Abdullah Hospital Foundation, Inc.
- Marawi Midtown Hospital
- Al-Shiek Hospital
- Sala'am Hospital Foundation, Inc.
- Ranao Doctors Polyclinic
- Mindalano Specialist Hospital Foundation, Inc.
- Hijrah Specialist Hospital

== Sister cities ==
Local

- Malaybalay
- Iligan
- Zamboanga City
- Cotabato City
- Lamitan
- Butuan
- Cagayan de Oro

== See also ==
- List of renamed cities and municipalities in the Philippines
