= Amai Pakpak =

Maranao military leader (died 1895)

- Died: 1895; Fort Marawi, Dansalan
- Other name: Akadir Akobar
- Occupation: Military leader
- Known for: 1891 and 1895 Battles of Marawi

Datu Akadir Akobar (died March 10, 1895), better known as Amai Pakpak, was a Maranao military leader who is noted for leading the Maranao resistance against Spanish colonization of the Lanao region in the 1890s.

== Background ==
A Marawi native, Amai Pakpak maintained a fortification known as Fort Marawi (situated near modern-day Agus 2 hydroelectric dam) which defended the region from Spanish colonizers.

While there were presumed to be many instances of Maranao resistance against the Spanish only battles involving Amai Pakpak were recorded; in 1891 against forces sent by Governor General Valeriano Weyler and in 1895 against forces sent by Governor General Ramón Blanco.

In the first battle in 1891, Amai Pakpak and his forces held off a Spanish attack in Lanao and suffered heavy casualties. The Spaniards retreated to Iligan after reinforcement from other areas around Lake Lanao arrived. In 1895, Amai Pakpak, together with his family and most of his forces were killed after a fleet of steamships organized by Governor General Blanco arrived in Lake Lanao to secure conquest of the Lanao region. The Spanish withdrew from the area following the outbreak of the Spanish–American War in 1898.

== Legacy ==
Amai Pakpak is widely regarded as a Maranao hero. in 1970, the Lanao General Hospital, was renamed after Amai Pakpak for his role in fighting against the Spanish in the 1895 Battle of Marawi.
