= Dansalan Declaration =

- Created: March 18, 1935
- Location: Dayawan Torogan, Dansalan, Lanao, Philippine Islands

The Dansalan Declaration was published by Moros on March 18, 1935 requesting Mindanao and the Sulu archipelago not to be included in the event that the United States grant independence to the Philippine Islands.

It was signed in the Torogan of the Dayawan sultanate of the Confederate States of Lanao. Conding Arindig was the Dayawan Sultan at the time when the declaration was signed up.
