= Maria Cristina Falls =

Waterfall in Lanao del Norte, Philippines

- Busay sa Maria Cristina (Cebuano); Sampaw a Maria Cristina (Maranao); Talon ng Maria Cristina (Filipino)
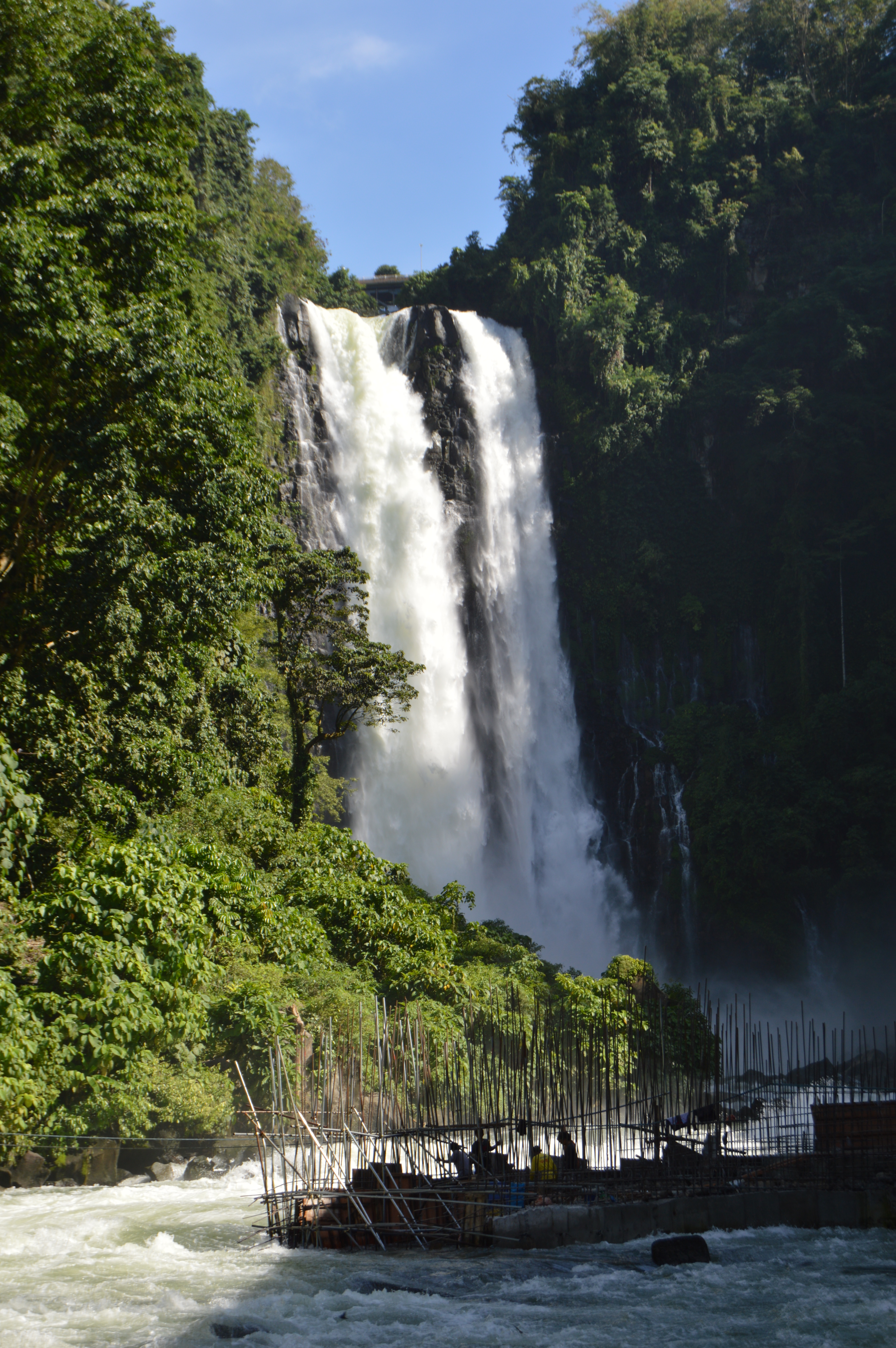

- Location within Philippines
- Location: Iligan City, Lanao del Norte, Philippines
- Coordinates: 8°10′59.38″N 124°11′42.14″E
- Type: Plunge
- Total height: 98 m (321.5 ft)
- Number of drops: 2
- Longest drop: 98 m (321.5 ft)
- Watercourse: Agus River
- Average flow rate: 130 m^{3} (4,600 cu ft)

Maria Cristina Falls is a waterfall of the Agus River in the Northern Mindanao region of the Philippines. It is sometimes called the "twin falls" as the flow is separated by a rock at the brink of the waterfall. The name comes from the Spanish queen, Maria Christina of Austria. It is located 9.3 kilometers away southwest of Iligan City at the boundaries of Barangays Maria Cristina, Ditucalan, and Buru-un. Known for its natural grandeur, the 98-meter (321.5-foot) high waterfall is also the primary source of electric power for the city's industries, being harnessed by the Agus VI Hydroelectric Plant.

== Agus VI Hydroelectric Plant ==
Maria Cristina Falls powers the Agus VI Hydroelectric Plant, one of the several hydroelectric plants that harness the Agus River. The power plant has a 200 MW potential capacity supplied by a water flow of about 130 cubic meters per second.

Agus VI is operated by the National Power Corporation. It was authorized by President Elpidio Quirino and was later commissioned on May 31, 1953. A ₱1.856 billion upgrading project for Agus VI is included under President Gloria Macapagal Arroyo's Mindanao Super Region development plan.

== See also ==
- List of waterfalls
