= List of active national liberation movements recognized by intergovernmental organizations =

This is a list of active national liberation movements currently recognized by intergovernmental organizations.

== Background ==
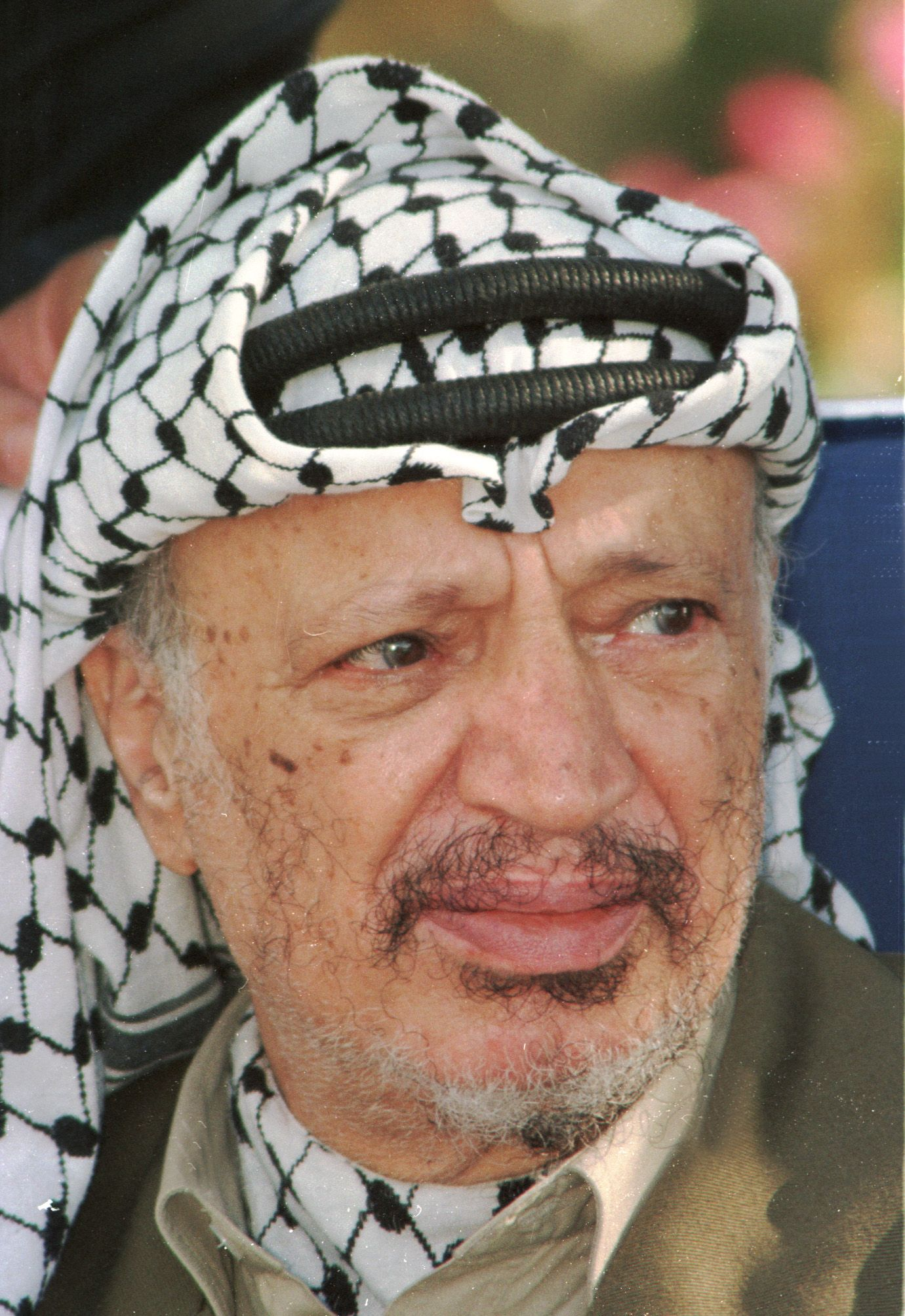
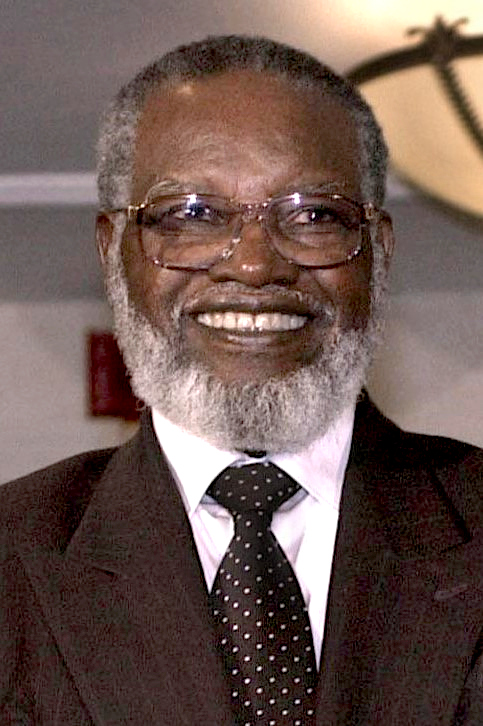
Only two national liberation movements have ever been granted observer status at the UN: the PLO in 1974 (led by Yasser Arafat, left) and SWAPO in 1976 (led by Sam Nujoma, right).

Throughout the 1970s, the United Nations General Assembly recognized several national liberation movements as "legitimate representatives" of colonial people, with SWAPO of Namibia and the Palestinian Liberation Organization (PLO) of Palestine holding non-state observer status at the General Assembly until 1990 and 2012, respectively. The aim of these movements is to eventually establish independent states and some of them have already succeeded. After independence most of the liberation movements transform into political parties – governing or oppositional.

The recognition of national liberation movements began in 1972 when the General Assembly invited liberation movements in Portuguese colonies to act as observers in relevant consultations. In 1974, all national liberation movements recognized by the Organisation of African Unity and the Arab League were invited to regularly participate as observers in conferences. A 1975 conference adopted a resolution on the status of "national liberation movements", and similar provisions were also adopted by the UNGA.

The national liberation movements that were recognized by the United Nations General Assembly as "legitimate representatives" of their peoples are: PAIGC of Guinea and Cabo Verde (1972–1975); FRELIMO of Mozambique (1972–1975); FNLA and MPLA of Angola (1972–1976); SWAPO of Namibia (1973–1990); ANC and PAC of South Africa (1973–1990); ZANU–PF, ZAPU, and UANC of Zimbabwe (1973–1980); PLO of Palestine (1974–2012); and Polisario Front of Western Sahara (1979–present).

Uniquely, the Polisario Front is the only remaining national liberation movement recognized by the United Nations General Assembly—an "oddity as an unresolved case of decolonization and national liberation"—though unlike SWAPO and the PLO, it has never been granted observer status. Since 1991, the UN is maintaining the United Nations Mission for the Referendum in Western Sahara, which oversees a cease-fire between Morocco and the Polisario Front with the goal of conducting a referendum on the status of Western Sahara.

== Current list ==
Map of recognized liberation movements, as of April 2026 Polisario Front (recognized by UN, 1979–) Moro National Liberation Front (recognized by OIC, 1977–) Kanak and Socialist National Liberation Front (recognized by MSG, 1989–) United Liberation Movement for West Papua (recognized by MSG, 2015–)

National liberation movement	People	Territory	Recognized by	Administrators	Notes
Polisario Front	Sahrawi people	Western Sahara	African Union; United Nations	Spain (de jure) (Note: In 1976, Spain withdrew from Western Sahara and informed the Secretary-General of the United Nations that it no longer considers itself responsible for the territory. Nonetheless, the criminal division of the Audiencia Nacional ruled in 2014 that Spain remains as Western Sahara's de jure administering power. This position is shared by the United Nations, the African Union, and several jurists. Additionally, Spain continues to manage Western Saharan airspace.); Morocco (occupier); Sahrawi Republic (partial control)	The Polisario Front was recognized by the United Nations as the legitimate representative of the people of Western Sahara in 1979 and 1980, and is occasionally invited to speak as the territory's representative before the Special Committee on Decolonization. The Polisario Front's Sahrawi Republic was admitted to the Organisation of African Unity as a member state in 1982, and co-founded its successor, the African Union. Western Sahara is listed as a non-self-governing territory by the UN (1963–present).
Moro National Liberation Front	Moro people	Bangsamoro	Organisation of Islamic Cooperation	Philippines	The Moro National Liberation Front has participated as an observer organization at the Organisation of Islamic Cooperation since 1977, blocking the Philippines' entry as an observer state. Bangsamoro has never been listed as a non-self-governing territory by the UN.
Kanak and Socialist National Liberation Front	Kanak people	New Caledonia	Melanesian Spearhead Group	France	The Kanak and Socialist National Liberation Front joined the Melanesian Spearhead Group as a member in 1989. New Caledonia is listed as a non-self-governing territory by the UN (1946–1957, 1986–present).
United Liberation Movement for West Papua	Papuan people	West Papua	Melanesian Spearhead Group	Indonesia	The United Liberation Movement for West Papua, a collective of organizations seeking West Papua's independence from Indonesia, joined the Melanesian Spearhead Group as an observer representing "Papuans living outside Indonesia" in 2015. West Papua, as Dutch New Guinea, was previously listed as a non-self-governing territory (1949–1963) and temporarily administered by the UN in 1962–1963.

== See also ==
- United Nations list of non-self-governing territories
- Wars of national liberation
- Liberation movement
- African independence movements
- Unrepresented Nations and Peoples Organization
- List of historical separatist movements
- Lists of active separatist movements
- Decolonisation of Africa
- Decolonization of the Americas
- Decolonization of Asia
- Decolonization of Oceania
