= Seal and flag of Nueva Vizcaya =

Seal of Nueva Vizcaya

Versions
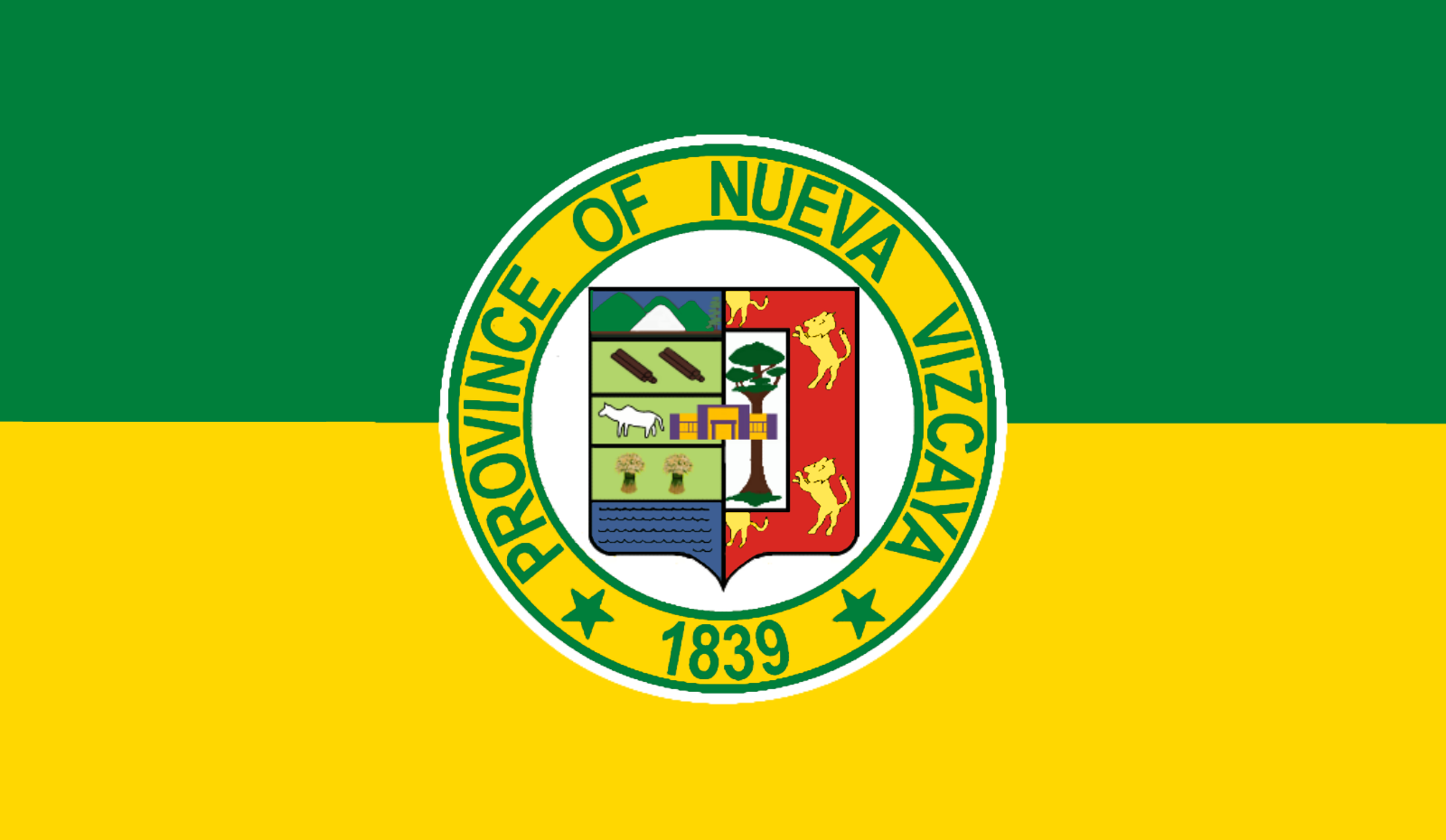
- Flag of Nueva Vizcaya

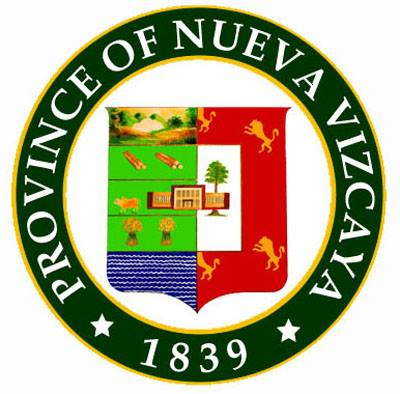
- Modified version of the seal
- Armiger: Nueva Vizcaya
- Adopted: 1917 (reinstated in 2013)
- Shield: Per pale and to the dexter tierced per fess, on chief or two palays, on fess two mountains proper, on base waves of seven argent and argent over all two logs, argent, a latin cross gules highlighted by an oak tree vert on earth proper with two sable wolves passant, the three arms of the cross peeking behind the tree's tip, bordure or, charged with four lions rampant gules.
- Motto: Province of Nueva Vizcaya
- Use: To represent the Provincial Government, to authenticate documents, etc.

The Seal of Nueva Vizcaya is the seal used by the provincial government of Nueva Vizcaya in the Philippines.

== History ==
The current seal was used from 1917 until 2001, when the seal was modified under the term of Governor Rodolfo Agbayani. The modified seal is not registered within the National Historical Institute (now the National Historical Commission of the Philippines.) The current seal was reinstated in 2013 under the term of Governor Ruth Padilla. The modified seal can still be seen in some occasions in conjunction with the current seal.

== Description ==
=== Original Seal ===
The dexter part of the seal is divided into three parts:

1. The two bundles of palay over a green field represent the abundant rice supply well-known in the province.
2. The three mountains symbolize the main mountain ranges that surround the province, the Cordillera, the Caraballo, and the Sierra Madre. The white hill (apparently missing in all versions of the seal) represents the Salinas Salt Spring that died out when the 1990 Luzon earthquake hit the province.
3. The two logs flowing over the Magat River indicate a well-established lumber industry of the province.

The sinister part of the seal contains the historical coat of arms of Biscay before 1986, its namesake. It was the birthplace of Governor-General Luis Lardizabal y Montojo, who ordered the creation of the politico-military comadancia of Nueva Vizcaya. The four lions in the Biscay coat of arms symbolize the nearly 4 centuries of Spanish rule over the Philippines.

The surrounding ring text reads PROVINCE OF NUEVA VIZCAYA (top), and OFFICIAL SEAL (bottom) separated by two black stars.

=== Modified Seal ===
The dexter part of the seal is divided into 5 parts, listed from top to bottom:

1. The three mountains symbolize the main mountain ranges that surround the province, the Cordillera, the Caraballo, and the Sierra Madre. The white hill, representing the Salinas Salt Spring, is still displayed, even though the springs already died out as a result of the 1990 Luzon earthquake. (present in the original 1917 seal)
2. The two piles of logs (separated from the river), containing three logs each, symbolize both forest wealth and the lumber industry. (present in the original 1917 seal)
3. One cattle, offset to the center to accommodate the capitol charge, represents agriculture. (new element)
4. The two bundles of palay over a green field represent the abundant rice supply well-known in the province. (present in original 1917 seal)
5. The water waves (separated from logs) represent the Magat river. (present in original 1917 seal)

The sinister part of the shield contains a modified version of the Biscay coat of arms, with the border's color changed to red, with the lions' color changed to yellow. The oak tree was replaced by a Narra tree, with the cross and two wolves removed. The center is charged with a profile of the front facade of the Provincial Capitol. The surrounding ring text reads PROVINCE OF NUEVA VIZCAYA (top), and 1839 (bottom) separated by two black circles.

== Flag ==
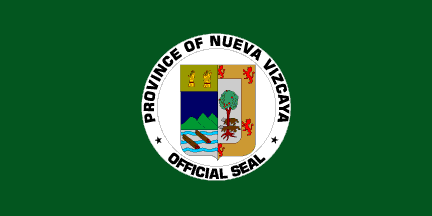
The former flag of Nueva Vizcaya (circa 1950s-early 2000s)

The flag of the province of Nueva Vizcaya consists of the modified seal centered on a horizontal bicolor of green and yellow.

It has seen unofficial use since the early 2000s slowly replacing the old one. It has remained unofficial until the Sangguniang Panlalawigan of Nueva Vizcaya passed Ordinance No. 2019-160 on June 17, 2019, officially adopting the flag and refining its specification.

The flag has a proportion of a length of 160 cm and a width of 93 cm, or an aspect ratio of 12900782080000000:7498588159999999.

An earlier flag has been registered within the National Historical Institute which includes the original version of the seal on a green background.

== Variants ==
Variants exist of the seal due to inconsistency as to what the actual depiction of the seal is.

A rendering of the seal showing 5 lions, following the original coat of arms of the Lords of Biscay

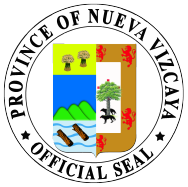
A rendering of the official seal first used in 2013

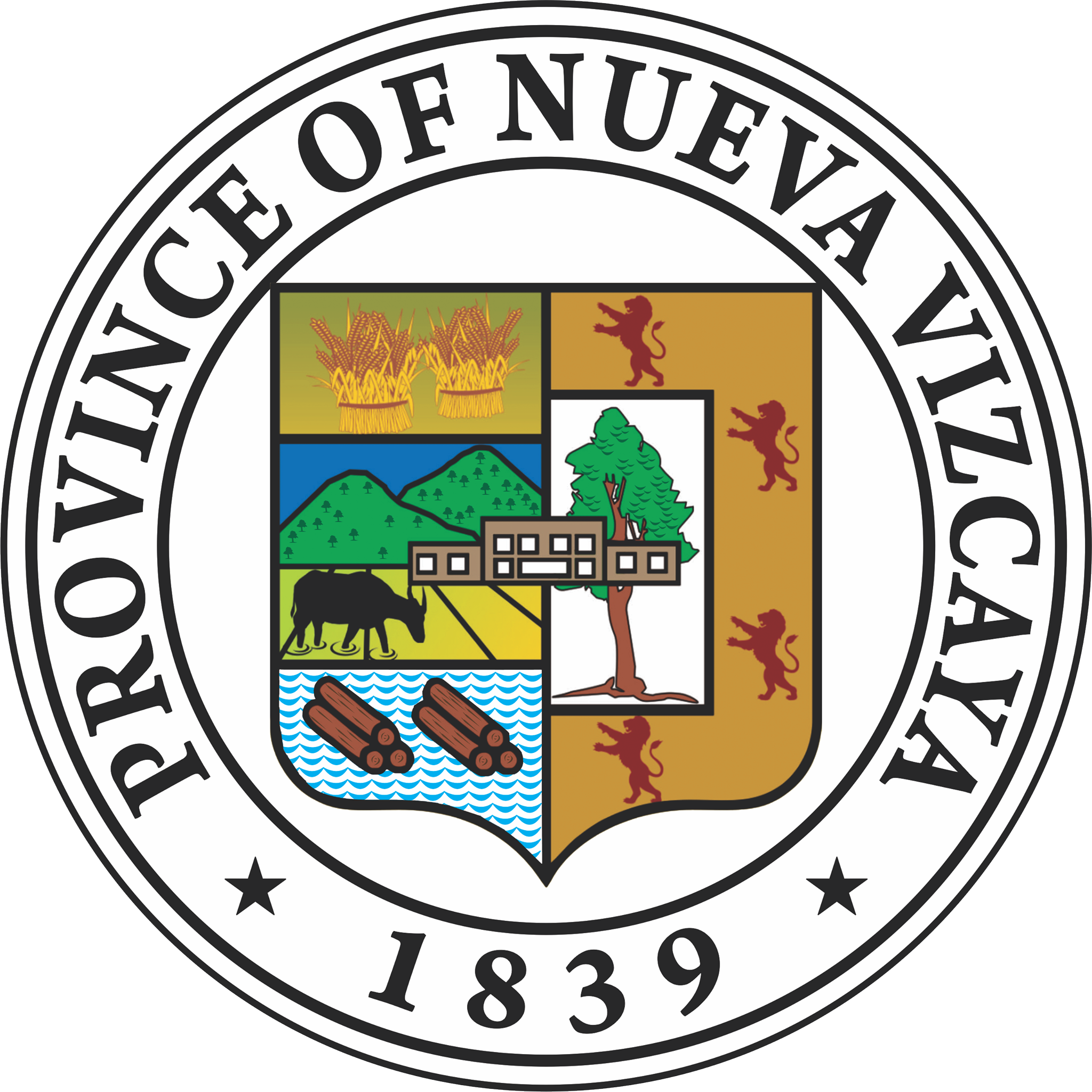
A variant of the seal most prominently used by the Provincial Administrator
