= List of national parks of the Philippines =

In the Philippines, National Parks are places of natural or historical value designated for protection and sustainable utilization by the Department of Environment and Natural Resources under the National Integrated Protected Areas System Act (1992).

In 2012, there were 240 protected areas in the Philippines, of which 35 have been classified as National Parks. By June 22, 2018, 94 areas were designated as protected areas within the classification of national park, when President Rodrigo Duterte signed the E-NIPAS Act of 2018.

== National parks ==
World Heritage Site or part of a World Heritage Site.

Name	Area	Established	Location		Coordinates
Name	Area	Established	Provinces	Island Group	Coordinates
Aurora Memorial National Park	5,676.00 ha (14,025.7 acres)	1937	Aurora; Nueva Ecija	Luzon	15°35′03″N 121°24′00″E
Balbalasang–Balbalan National Park	1,338.00 ha (3,306.3 acres)	1972	Kalinga	Luzon	17°27′00″N 121°09′00″E
Bangan Hill National Park	13.90 ha (34.3 acres)	1995	Nueva Vizcaya	Luzon	16°29′00″N 121°09′00″E
Bataan National Park	23,688.00 ha (58,534.3 acres)	1945	Bataan	Luzon	14°36′22″N 120°30′31″E
Biak-na-Bato National Park	2,117.00 ha (5,231.2 acres)	1937	Bulacan	Luzon	15°07′08″N 121°05′06″E
Bulabog Putian National Park	854.33 ha (2,111.1 acres)	1961	Iloilo	Visayas	11°02′01″N 122°40′02″E
Caramoan National Park	347.00 ha (857.5 acres)	1938	Camarines Sur	Luzon	13°46′49″N 123°52′49″E
Cassamata Hill National Park	57.00 ha (140.9 acres)	1974	Abra	Luzon	17°35′28″N 120°37′17″E
Fuyot Springs National Park	819.00 ha (2,023.8 acres)	1938	Isabela	Luzon	17°12′40″N 122°00′56″E
Guadalupe Mabugnao Mainit Hot Spring National Park	57.50 ha (142.1 acres)	1972	Cebu	Visayas	10°08′01″N 123°36′00″E
Hundred Islands National Park	1,676.30 ha (4,142.2 acres)	1940	Pangasinan	Luzon	16°12′02″N 120°02′15″E
Kuapnit Balinsasayao National Park	364.00 ha (899.5 acres)	1937	Leyte	Visayas	10°38′45″N 124°55′13″E
Lake Butig National Park	68.00 ha (168.0 acres)	1965	Lanao del Sur	Mindanao	7°44′07″N 124°17′19″E
Lake Dapao National Park	1,500.00 ha (3,706.6 acres)	1965	Lanao del Sur	Mindanao	7°47′16″N 124°02′51″E
Libmanan Caves National Park	19.40 ha (47.9 acres)	1934	Camarines Sur	Luzon	13°39′00″N 122°48′00″E
Luneta National Park	58 ha (140 acres)	1955	Metro Manila	Luzon	14°35′00″N 120°58′42″E
MacArthur Landing Memorial National Park	6.78 ha (16.8 acres)	1977	Leyte	Visayas	11°10′19″N 125°00′45″E
Mado Hot Spring National Park	48.00 ha (118.6 acres)	1939	Cotabato	Mindanao	7°13′00″N 124°15′00″E
Minalungao National Park	2,018.00 ha (4,986.6 acres)	1967	Nueva Ecija	Luzon	15°18′27″N 121°08′33″E
Mount Arayat National Park	3,715.23 ha (9,180.5 acres)	1933	Pampanga	Luzon	15°12′13″N 120°43′45″E
Mount Dajo National Park	213.35 ha (527.2 acres)	1938	Sulu	Mindanao	6°00′47″N 121°03′13″E
Mount Data National Park	5,512.00 ha (13,620.4 acres)	1936	Benguet; Mountain Province	Luzon	16°52′41″N 120°50′18″E
Mounts Iglit–Baco National Park	75,455.00 ha (186,453.4 acres)	1969	Mindoro Occidental	Luzon	12°44′36″N 121°07′31″E
Mount Pulag National Park	11,550.00 ha (28,540.7 acres)	1987	Benguet; Ifugao; Nueva Vizcaya	Luzon	16°35′01″N 120°53′01″E
Naujan Lake National Park	21,655.00 ha (53,510.7 acres)	1956	Mindoro Oriental	Luzon	13°10′22″N 121°20′34″E
Northern Luzon Heroes Hill National Park	1,316.00 ha (3,251.9 acres)	1963	Ilocos Sur	Luzon	17°29′10″N 120°27′11″E
Olongapo Naval Base Perimeter National Park	9.04 ha (22.3 acres)	1968	Zambales	Luzon	14°49′37″N 120°17′10″E
Pagsanjan Gorge National Park	152.64 ha (377.2 acres)	1939	Laguna	Luzon	14°16′00″N 121°29′00″E
Pantuwaraya Lake National Park	20.00 ha (49.4 acres)	1965	Lanao del Sur	Mindanao	8°02′00″N 124°16′00″E
Paoay Lake National Park	340.00 ha (840.2 acres)	1969	Ilocos Norte	Luzon	18°07′16″N 120°32′12″E
Puerto Princesa Subterranean River National Park	22,202.00 ha (54,862.3 acres)	1999	Palawan	Luzon	10°10′00″N 118°55′00″E
Quezon Memorial National Park	22.70 ha (56.1 acres)	1975	Metro Manila	Luzon	14°39′04″N 121°02′57″E
Rungkunan National Park	undetermined	1965	Lanao del Sur	Mindanao	8°03′40″N 124°24′11″E
Sacred Mountain National Park	94.00 ha (232.3 acres)	1965	Lanao del Sur	Mindanao	8°01′16″N 124°17′47″E
Salikata National Park	undetermined	1965	Lanao del Sur	Mindanao	7°52′14″N 124°21′32″E

== See also ==
- List of protected areas of the Philippines
- Environment of the Philippines
