= Salinas Natural Monument =

Protected area in Nueva Vizcaya, Philippines

- IUCN category III (natural monument or feature)
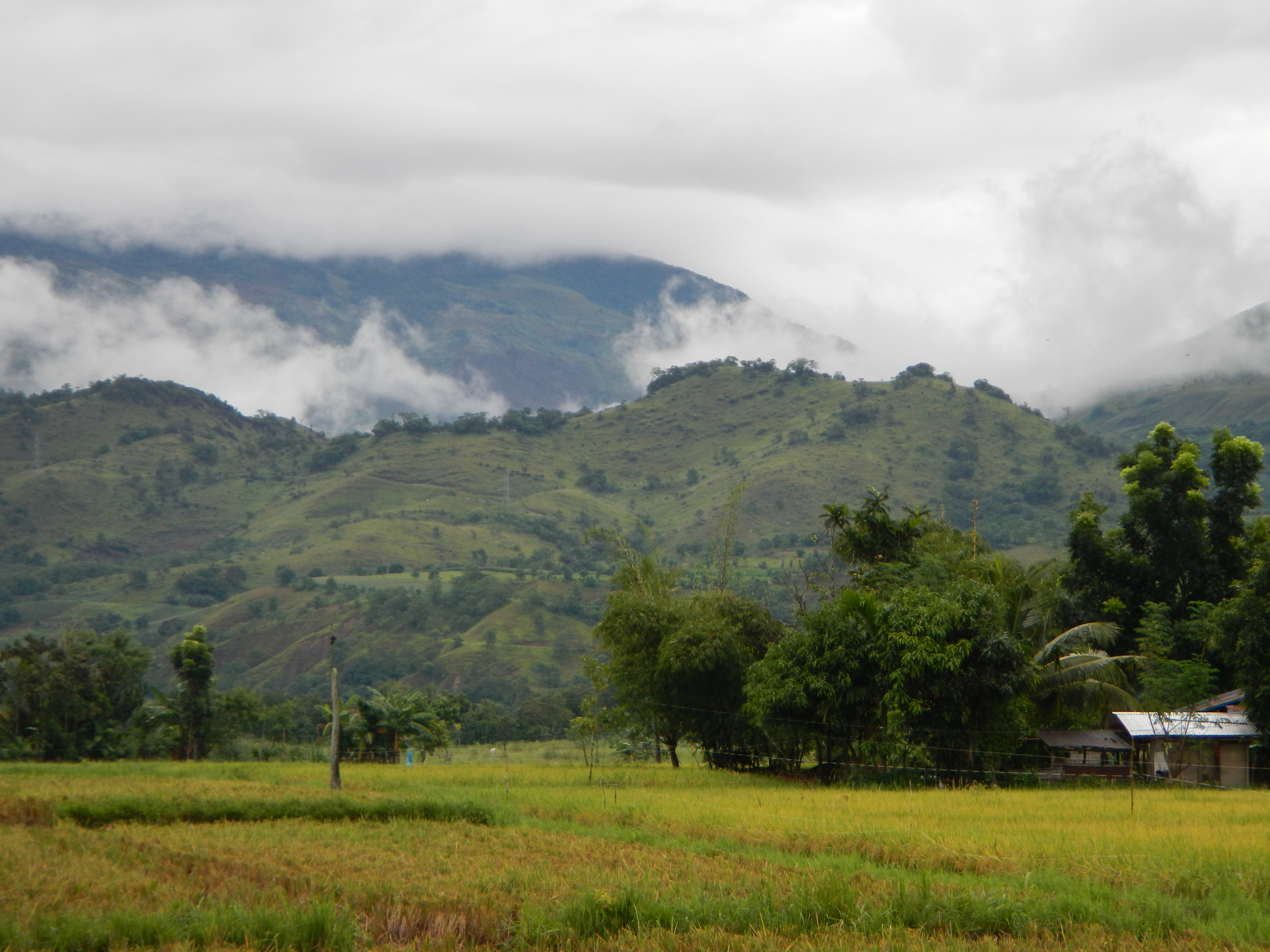
- The mountains of Salinas in Bambang

- Location within Luzon Location within Philippines
- Location: Nueva Vizcaya, Philippines
- Nearest city: Santiago
- Coordinates: 16°22′14″N 121°1′5″E
- Area: 6,675.56 hectares (16,495.7 acres)
- Established: May 18, 1914 (Forest reserve); November 29, 1926 (Deer refuge); April 23, 2000 (Natural monument)
- Governing body: Department of Environment and Natural Resources

The Salinas Natural Monument is a natural monument comprising saline springs and forested mountains in southern Cagayan Valley in the Philippines. It is one of four protected areas in the landlocked province of Nueva Vizcaya spanning an area of 6,675.56 hectares (16,495.7 acres) in the municipalities of Bambang, Kayapa and Aritao. The park was established on May 18, 1914, as the Salinas Forest Reserve covering the Salinas Salt Springs and surrounding forest through Executive Order No. 44 signed by Governor-General Francis Burton Harrison. In 1926, through amendments made in Proclamation No. 53 by Governor-General Leonard Wood, the forest reserve was re-established as the Salinas Deer Refuge. Salinas was finally declared a natural monument in 2000 under the National Integrated Protected Areas System through Proclamation No. 275 by President Joseph Estrada.

== Description ==
The natural monument is centered on the mountain of salt mines (Spanish: salinas) in the barangay of the same name in Bambang municipality near the confluence of Magat River and Santa Cruz River in the Upper Magat River Basin. This once snow-white mountain of travertine situated on the southeastern slopes of the Cordillera Central contains the Salinas Salt Springs, a popular attraction in the province during the early days of Spanish and American colonial periods. The mountain of salt was formed through the continuous flow of a natural spring containing sulfate and carbonate salts over millions of years. When the 1990 Luzon earthquake hit the area, tectonic movements caused the underground water to be diverted leaving the whitish mounds dry and causing them to turn gray. At present, this mountain at Sitio Bansing once known for its salt industry is being utilized as fishponds arranged in terraces on the mountainside for freshwater fish such as tilapia and African sharptooth catfish, including the giant freshwater prawn.

The surrounding forest inhabited by numerous Philippine deers spreads over the villages of Salinas and Barat in Bambang, Mapayao, Acacia and San Fabian in Kayapa, and Baan in Aritao just north of Caraballo Sur. It is located approximately 80 kilometres (50 mi) south of the region's commercial center of Santiago and some 120 kilometres (75 mi) from the Cauayan Airport. It is accessible via a 15-kilometre (9.3 mi) road from the Pan-Philippine Highway (AH26) in Bambang.

On June 22, 2018, the Salinas Natural Monument was designated a national park through the Expanded National Integrated Protected Areas System (ENIPAS) Act or Republic Act No. 11038 which was signed by President Rodrigo Duterte.

== See also ==
- Bangan Hill National Park
