= Guadalupe Mabugnao Mainit Hot Spring National Park =

National park in the Philippines

- IUCN category V (protected landscape/seascape)
- Location within Metro Cebu Location within Visayas Location within Philippines
- Location: Cebu, Philippines
- Nearest city: Cebu City, Cebu, Philippines
- Coordinates: 10°08′23″N 123°36′45″E
- Area: 57.50 hectares (142.1 acres)
- Established: June 17, 1972
- Governing body: Department of Environment and Natural Resources

Guadalupe Mabugnao Mainit Hot Spring National Park is a protected area of the Philippines located in Barangay Guadalupe in Carcar, Cebu, approximately 50 kilometers from the provincial capital, Cebu City. The park covers an area of 57.50 hectares, occupying an important watershed forest reserve in the central Mantalongon mountain range. It was declared a national park in 1972 by virtue of Republic Act No. 6429.

The park is frequented by daily visitors for its hot springs, where cottages and pools have been developed. Life-size statues of saints and Christ including that of Santo Niño de Cebú have also added to its tourist attractions. A trail up a hill leads to at least three caves, the most explored being Cave Lorett and Cave Moymoy. Near Cave Lorett is another spring and four rivers. The park also contains a dam that supplies Carcar's water.

== See also ==
- List of national parks of the Philippines
