= Mado Hot Spring National Park =

National park in Maguindanao del Norte, Philippines

- IUCN category II (national park)
- Location within Mindanao mainland Location within Philippines
- Location: Datu Odin Sinsuat, Maguindanao del Norte, Philippines
- Nearest city: Cotabato City, Maguindanao del Norte, Philippines
- Coordinates: 7°16′N 124°21′E
- Area: 48 hectares (120 acres)
- Established: September 25, 1939
- Governing body: Department of Environment and Natural Resources

Mado Hot Spring National Park is a protected area of the Philippines located in barangay Awang in the municipality of Datu Odin Sinsuat, Maguindanao del Norte in Mindanao, Philippines. The park covers an area of 48 hectares containing the medicinal hotspring, along with a natural swimming pool and health resort near the Awang Airport. It was declared a national park in 1939 by virtue of Proclamation No. 456.

== See also ==
- List of national parks of the Philippines
