= Salikata National Park =

Protected area in Lanao del Sur, Philippines

- IUCN category V (protected landscape/seascape)
- Location within Mindanao mainland Location within Philippines
- Location: Lanao del Sur, Philippines
- Nearest city: Marawi, Lanao del Sur, Philippines
- Coordinates: 7°57′N 124°36′E
- Area: undetermined
- Established: May 5, 1965
- Governing body: Department of Environment and Natural Resources

Salikata National Park is a protected area of the Philippines located in the municipality of Lumba-Bayabao, Lanao del Sur in Mindanao Island. Nestled in the thickly forested foothills of the Mount Ragang range (also known as the Piapayungan mountain range), the park is one of the six national parks in the province of Lanao del Sur declared in 1965. The area is characterized by waterfalls, river gorge, rocky cliffs and dense canopy stretching the length of the Gata River valley from barangay Salaman to Mapantao near the provincial border with Cotabato.

== See also ==
- List of national parks of the Philippines
