= Olongapo Naval Base Perimeter National Park =

Protected area in Zambales, Philippines

- IUCN category V (protected landscape/seascape)
- Location within Luzon Location within Philippines
- Location: Zambales, Philippines
- Coordinates: 14.8314675°N 120.2835206°E
- Area: 0.09 km^{2} (0.035 sq mi)
- Established: 1968

Olongapo Naval Base Perimeter National Park is a national park and protected area located in Zambales, Philippines. The park was established in 1968 and is approximately 0.09 square kilometers.

== See also ==
- List of national parks of the Philippines
