= Paoay Lake =

Lake in Paoay, Luzon, Philippines

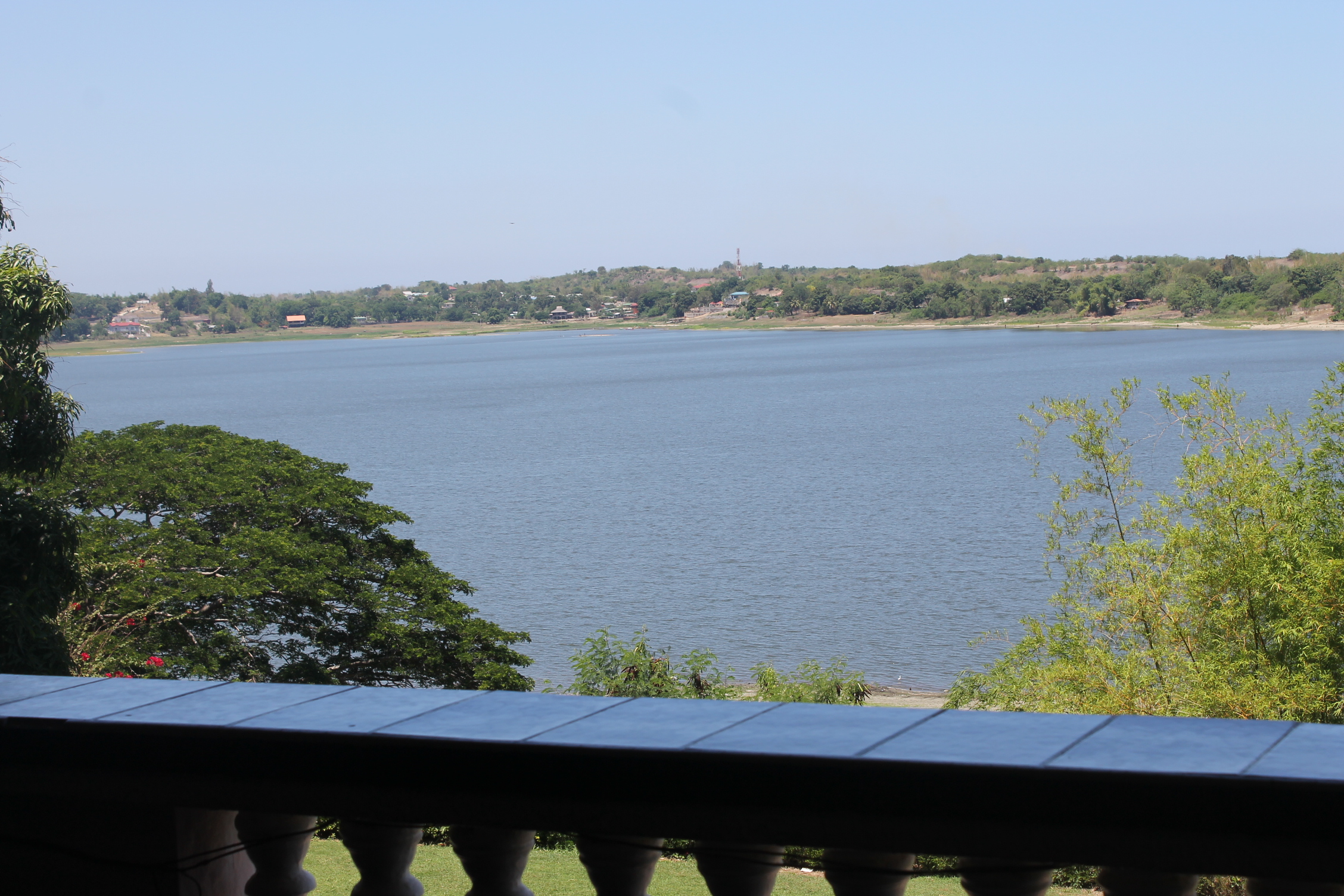
- The lake as seen from the Malacañang of the North

- Location in Luzon Location in the Philippines
- Location: Ilocos Norte, Luzon
- Coordinates: 18°7′12″N 120°32′22″E
- Type: lake
- Basin countries: Philippines
- Surface area: 3.86 km^{2} (1.49 sq mi)
- Average depth: 6 m (20 ft)
- Max. depth: 10 m (33 ft)
- Surface elevation: below sea level
- Settlements: Paoay

Paoay Lake (locally known as Dakél a Danum; Ilokano: Big Water) is a lake within the municipality of Paoay, in northwestern Luzon, Philippines. It is the largest lake in the province of Ilocos Norte and one of the largest natural lakes in the area.

Historically known as Lago de Nanguyudan, the lake supposedly was the site of a prosperous barangay called San Juan de Sahagún (Saint John of Sahagún) that sank after an earthquake. The freshwater lake and its 1-kilometre (0.62 mi) surroundings was declared a national park in 1969 by virtue of Republic Act 5631. In 1978, through Presidential Decree 1554, the park was reduced to an area of 340 hectares (3.4 km^{2}) concentrated on the lake itself around its highest water level. In 2025, the park was further designated as a Protected Area to be known as the Paoay Lake Protected Landscape through Republic Act No. 12230.

== Geography ==
The lake covers a surface area of 386 hectares (3.86 km^{2}) with an average depth of 6 metres (20 ft). It is bounded by the barangays of Suba in the north, Nanguyudan in the northeast, Pasil in the east, Sungadan in the south, and Nagbacalan in the west near the border with the city of Laoag and some 3 kilometres (1.9 mi) away from the sea. It was formed as a result of coastal progradation and the subsequent development of a sand dune barrier during the late Quaternary Period. The lake has no tributaries. Most of the lake's inflow consists of groundwater and surface runoff from surrounding hills during rainy season.

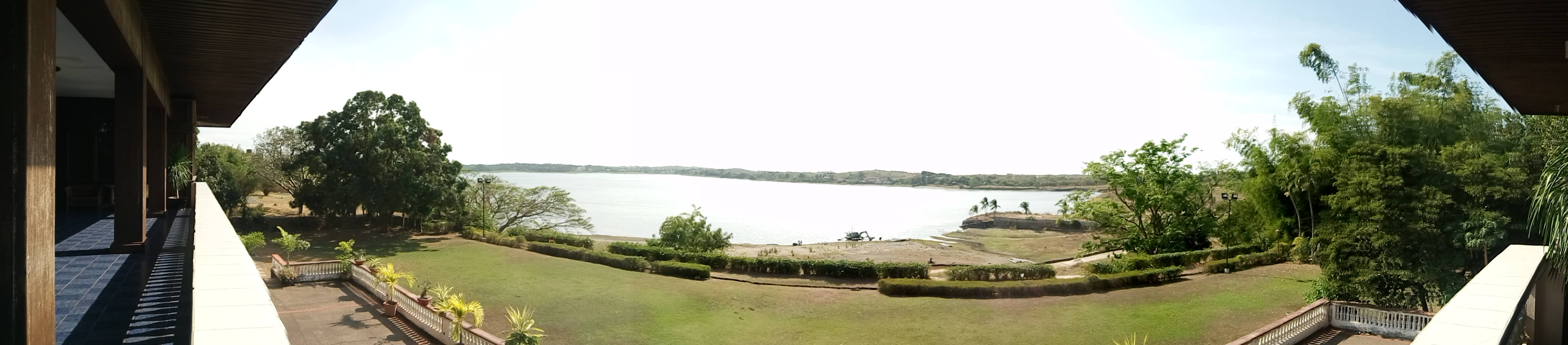
Paoay Lake as viewed from the Malacañang of the North.

== Biota ==
The lake is inhabited by phytoplankton, macrophytes and zooplankton which includes 8 species of copepods, 8 species of cladocerans and 11 species of rotifers. Fish recorded include tilapia, catfish and mudfish. Some aquatic plants also inhabit the lake such as water spinach, water hyacinth, tape grass and Buntót-pusà (lit. "cat's tail", Dysophylla auricularia).

On the slopes around and above the lake grow ipil-ipil, acacia, gmelina and banaba plants. The park is also home to avifauna species such as the white-collared kingfisher, brahminy kite, and Philippine duck, including some migratory birds such as the grey heron, osprey, and great egret.

== Economy ==
Paoay Lake is one of the many tourist attractions in Ilocos Norte. Some of its most visited sights include the Malacañang ti Amianan (Malacañang of the North), a historical house museum built by the family of former president Ferdinand Marcos, the 18-hole Paoay Golf Course, and a sports complex. Also located in the vicinity are Fort Ilocandia Resort and Casino and Plaza del Norte Hotel and Convention Center. It is accessible via the Paoay Lake Road from the main highway and the Laoag–Balaccad Road from the Laoag International Airport.

Aside from tourism, small-scale aquaculture has also been introduced as livelihood of the local townsfolk residing in the area. Fish pens primarily of tilapia can be found near the shores. The lake's status as a protected area, however, enables the government to monitor and control human activity in the lake in order to prevent misuse of its resources.

== See also ==
- List of national parks of the Philippines
