= Rungkunan National Park =

Protected area in Lanao del Sur, Philippines

- IUCN category V (protected landscape/seascape)
- Location within Mindanao mainland Location within Philippines
- Location: Lanao del Sur, Philippines
- Nearest city: Marawi, Lanao del Sur, Philippines
- Coordinates: 7°59′N 124°41′E
- Area: undetermined
- Established: May 5, 1965
- Governing body: Department of Environment and Natural Resources

Rungkunan National Park is a protected area of the Philippines located in the municipalities of Ditsaan-Ramain and Tagoloan II in Lanao del Sur, some 10 kilometers east-south-east of the provincial capital Marawi. The park covers the mountainous eastern section of Lanao del Sur near the Lake Lanao-Agus River Watershed Area known for its beautiful sparkling stream, virgin forest and invigorating climate. It was declared a national park in 1965 by virtue of Republic Act No. 4190.

== See also ==
- List of national parks of the Philippines
