= Abuyog =

Municipality in Leyte, Philippines

- Municipality
- Municipality of Abuyog
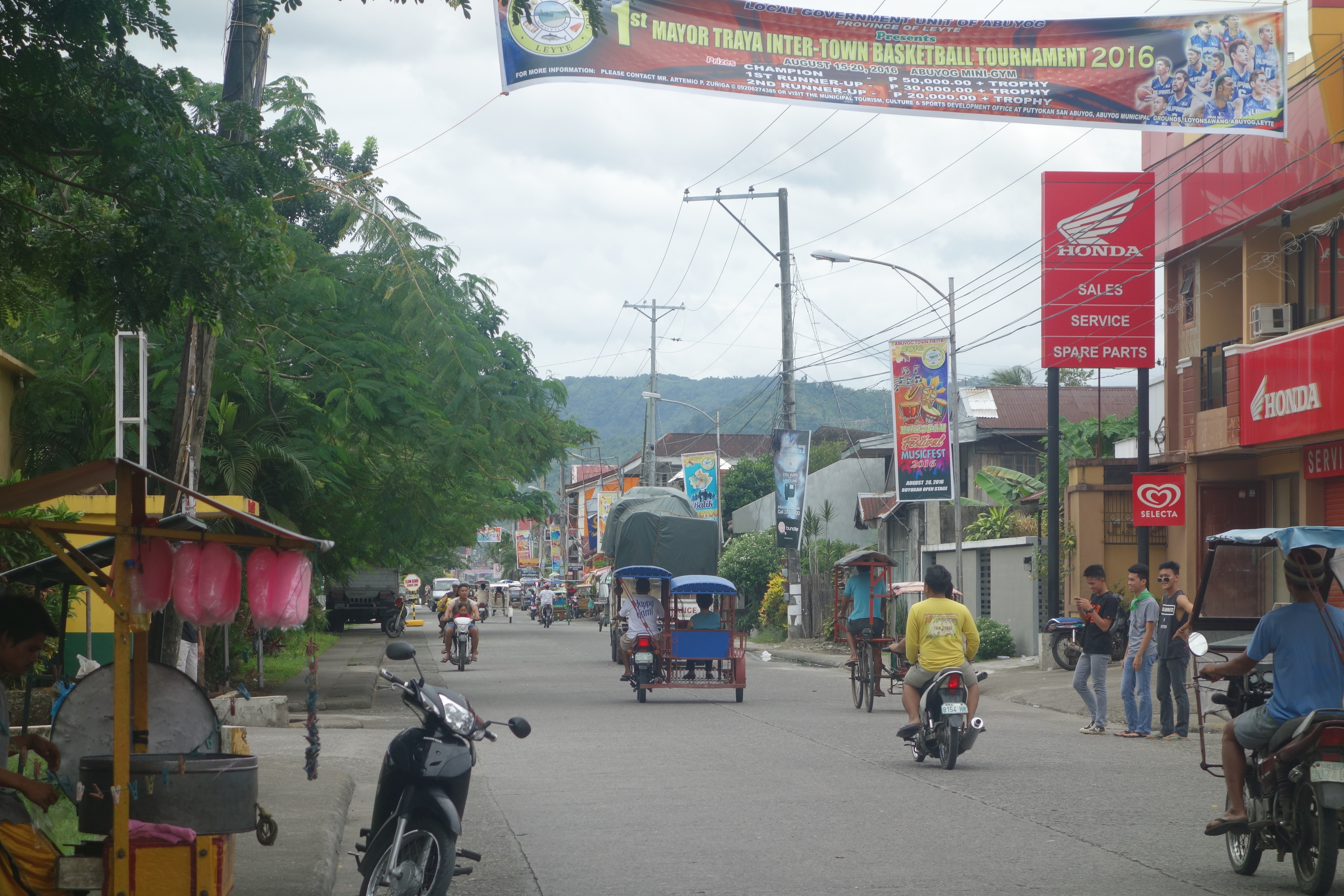
- Downtown area

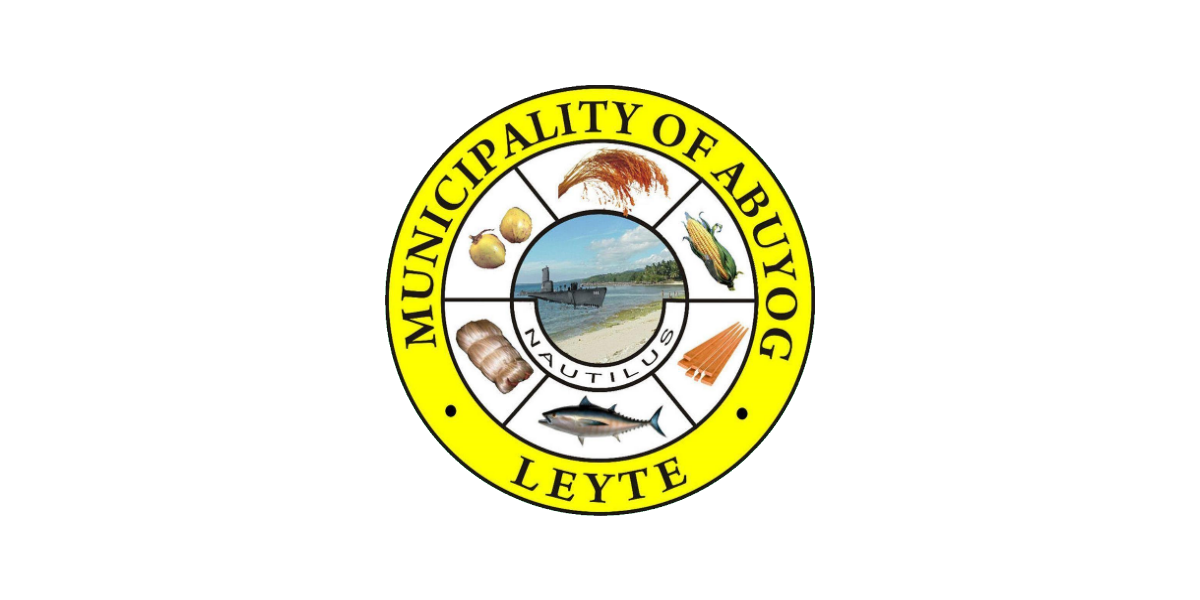
- Flag
- Nickname: Home of the Buyogan Festival
- Anthem: Abuyog Hymn
- Interactive map of Abuyog
- Location within the Philippines
- Coordinates: 10°44′49″N 125°00′43″E
- Country: Philippines
- Region: Eastern Visayas
- Province: Leyte
- District: 5th district
- Barangays: 63 (see Barangays)

Government
  - Type: Sangguniang Bayan
  - Mayor: Lemuel Gin K. Traya (NPC)
  - Vice Mayor: Dario P. Lleve (NPC)
  - Representative: Carl Nicolas C. Cari (Lakas)
  - Councilors: List: • Editha C. Deloy; • James L. Bohol; • Antonio C. Almendra; • Jeannette A. Valida; • Benito C. Sy; • Arnold R. Allera; • Erwin V. Belleza; • Lemuel Lourdino L. Molina; DILG Masterlist of Officials
  - Electorate: 41,899 voters (2025)

Area
  - Total: 688.25 km^{2} (265.73 sq mi)
- Elevation: 17 m (56 ft)
- Highest elevation: 357 m (1,171 ft)
- Lowest elevation: 0 m (0 ft)

Population (2024 census)
  - Total: 61,854
  - Density: 89.871/km^{2} (232.77/sq mi)
  - Households: 14,896
- Demonym: Abuyognon

Economy
  - Income class: 1st municipal income class
  - Poverty incidence: 27.8% (2023)
  - Revenue: ₱ 412.5 million (2024)
  - Assets: ₱ 1,379 million (2024)
  - Expenditure: ₱ 499.7 million (2024)
  - Liabilities: ₱ 237.4 million (2024)

Service provider
  - Electricity: Don Orestes Romualdez Electric Coperative (DORELCO)
- Time zone: UTC+8 (PST)
- ZIP code: 6510
- PSGC: 0803701000
- IDD : area code: +63 (0)53
- Native languages: Waray; Tagalog
- Website: abuyogleyte.gov.ph

Abuyog (IPA: [ʔɐ'bujog]), officially the Municipality of Abuyog, (Waray: Bungto han Abuyog; Cebuano: Lungsod sa Abuyog; Tagalog: Bayan ng Abuyog), is a municipality in the province of Leyte, Philippines. According to the 2024 census, it has a population of 61,854 people.

Facing Leyte Gulf out into the Philippine Sea, it is the largest town on the island of Leyte in terms of land area. It is bordered to the north by Javier, to the west by Mahaplag and Baybay, and to the south by Silago, located in Southern Leyte.

== History ==
=== Early history ===
In 1588 the local inhabitants revolted and killed the encomendero. In response to this, Captain Juan Esguerra dispatched a punitive force to punish the assassins of the encomendero. In 1613, the town was raided and plundered by the Sanguiles and Caragas.

In 1655, the Jesuits established Abuyog as their second mission post, with Dagami serving as the center. In 1716, the town and parish were officially founded under the patronage of Saint Francis Xavier, the Apostle of the Indies. The Augustinians took over in 1768, continuing the work of Fathers Jose Herrera and Cipriano Barbasan. In 1843, the town was entrusted to the Franciscan Order, with Fr. Santiago Malonda becoming its first Franciscan parish priest. A horse path connecting Abuyog and Dulag was opened in 1851.

The early captains were Galza, Foran, Nicolas Mandia, Faustino Remanes, Prudencio Remanes, Felipe Costin, Ciriaco Costin, Eulalio Brillo, and Vicente Tiaoson. Eulalio Brillo became president in 1896–1899 while Nazario Tupa took office in 1900. Eugenio Villote finished Tupa's term. From 1901 to 1906, pulahan attacks occurred, led by Faustino Ablen. The municipal building was razed. Ex-Captain Eugenio Villote, Pedro Gonazaga, and two other policemen were killed in the encounter.

=== Electoral management ===
In the electoral division made by the Philippine Assembly, Abuyog was placed in the third district of Leyte. During the Commonwealth regime, Abuyog was transferred to the fourth district. During these periods, the town was under the administration of Arturo Brillo, Vicente Brillante, Basilio Adolfo (two terms), Antero Brillo and Ricardo Collantes (three terms). In 1940, Pedro Gallego was elected mayor and served until 3 July 1946. Mayor Pedro Remanes Gallego was the only mayor of Leyte province who did not surrender to the Japanese forces. On 4 July 1946, Catalino Landia was appointed mayor with a tenure lasting three turns.

Abuyog inaugurated the first passenger bus service in 1925. In 1936, the vice-president Sergio Osmeña inaugurated the Baybay–Abuyog road, which linked the eastern and western coasts of Leyte.

=== Japanese occupation ===
During World War II, Abuyog became a Japanese occupied area. Pedro Gallego retreated to the mountains to lead the guerrilla resistance. His wife, Ignacia Regis Gallego, organised the non-combatant Auxiliary Forces. On 13 October 1942, the Japanese abandoned the town due to guerrilla pressure, returning 26 November 1943, suffering heavy losses at the hands of the guerrillas. From 26–31 December, the XXIV Corps of the United States opened the Palompon–Libungao road. The 77th Infantry Division led the charge to secure the road, facing resistance from the Japanese 5th Regiment.

On 14 July 1944, when the submarine Nautilus landed in Barrio San Roque, Mayor Gallego provided the logistics (manpower, bamboo rafts, transport, lookouts) to Colonel Ruperto Kangleon (the head of Leyte Resistance Movement) to unload 72 tons of automatic weapons (Thompson submachine guns and other rapid fires like carbine and M1 Garand guns), ammunition, food and propaganda materials for Leyte and Samar guerrillas.

Kangleon tipped the naval officers of Nautilus on the locations of Japanese fortifications in Leyte province. The local guerrillas of Abuyog used the automatic weapons to repeatedly ambush the Japanese forces. When the American fleet under General Douglas MacArthur was sighted off Leyte Gulf, Japanese forces left Abuyog before the landing of Allied Forces, which included the Filipino troops of the Philippine Commonwealth Army and Philippine Constabulary military units. After liberation, elementary school education was resumed on 4 December 1944, under the supervision of the Philippine Civil Affairs Unit (PCAU).

== Geography ==
=== Daughter towns ===
- Javier, formerly known as Barangay Bugho.
- MacArthur, formerly known as Barangay Taraguna.
- Mahaplag, formerly known as Barangay Mahaplag.

=== Barangays ===
Abuyog is politically subdivided into 63 barangays. Each barangay consists of puroks and some have sitios.

- Alangilan
- Anibongon
- Buaya
- Bagacay
- Bahay
- Balinsasayao
- Balocawe
- Balocawehay (Quarry)
- Barayong
- Bayabas
- Bito (Poblacion)
- Buenavista
- Bulak
- Buntay (Poblacion)
- Bunga
- Burubud-an
- Cagbolo
- Can-aporong
- Canmarating
- Can-uguib (Poblacion)
- Capilian
- Cadac-an
- Combis
- Dingle
- Guintagbucan (Poblacion)
- Hampipila
- Katipunan
- Kikilo
- Laray
- Lawa-an
- Libertad
- Loyonsawang (Poblacion)
- Mahagna (New Cagbolo)
- Mag-atubang
- Mahayahay
- Maitum
- Malaguicay
- Matagnao
- Nalibunan (Poblacion)
- Nibga
- Odiongan
- Pagsang-an
- Paguite
- Parasanon
- Picas Sur
- Pilar
- Pinamanagan
- Salvasion
- San Francisco
- San Isidro
- San Roque
- Santa Fe (Poblacion)
- Santa Lucia
- Santo Niño (Poblacion)
- Tabigue
- Tadoc
- New Taligue
- Old Taligue
- Tib-o
- Tinalian
- Tinocolan
- Tuy-a
- Victory (Poblacion)

=== Climate ===
Climate data for Abuyog, Leyte
Month	Jan	Feb	Mar	Apr	May	Jun	Jul	Aug	Sep	Oct	Nov	Dec	Year
Mean daily maximum °C (°F)	28 (82)	29 (84)	29 (84)	30 (86)	30 (86)	30 (86)	29 (84)	29 (84)	29 (84)	29 (84)	29 (84)	29 (84)	29 (84)
Mean daily minimum °C (°F)	22 (72)	22 (72)	22 (72)	23 (73)	25 (77)	25 (77)	25 (77)	25 (77)	25 (77)	24 (75)	24 (75)	23 (73)	24 (75)
Average precipitation mm (inches)	78 (3.1)	57 (2.2)	84 (3.3)	79 (3.1)	118 (4.6)	181 (7.1)	178 (7.0)	169 (6.7)	172 (6.8)	180 (7.1)	174 (6.9)	128 (5.0)	1,598 (62.9)
Average rainy days	16.7	13.8	17.3	18.5	23.2	26.5	27.1	26.0	26.4	27.5	24.6	21.0	268.6
Source: Meteoblue

== Demographics ==
Population census of Abuyog
Year	Pop.	±% p.a.
1903	8,943	—
1918	16,546	+4.19%
1939	39,111	+4.18%
1948	46,930	+2.05%
1960	37,709	−1.81%
1970	34,434	−0.90%
1975	37,864	+1.92%
1980	41,702	+1.95%
1990	47,265	+1.26%
1995	48,905	+0.64%
2000	53,837	+2.08%
2007	56,097	+0.57%
2010	57,146	+0.68%
2015	59,571	+0.79%
2020	61,216	+0.57%
2024	61,854	+0.25%
Source: Philippine Statistics Authority

In the 2024 census, the population of Abuyog was 61,854 people, with a density of 90 inhabitants per square kilometre or 230 inhabitants per square mile.

== Economy ==
Poverty incidence of Abuyog

Source: Philippine Statistics Authority

The main language used in Abuyog is now Waray-Waray language.

== Government ==
2025-2028 Abuyog, Leyte Officials
Position	Name	Party
Mayor	Lemuel Gin K. Traya	NPC
Vice Mayor	Dario P. Lleve	NPC
Councilors	Lemuel Vincent DP. Tan	NPC
Councilors	Felicito V. Topia Jr.	NPC
Councilors	Ma. Amelia C. Gacis	Aksyon
Councilors	Ofelia K. Traya	Independent
Councilors	Rodulfo M. Cabias	NPC
Councilors	Roy Percival M. Perez	Aksyon
Councilors	Patrocino A. Risos Jr.	Aksyon
Councilors	Erwin V. Belleza	NPC
Ex Officio Municipal Council Members
ABC President	TBD	Nonpartisan
SK Federation President	TBD	Nonpartisan

== Notable landmarks ==
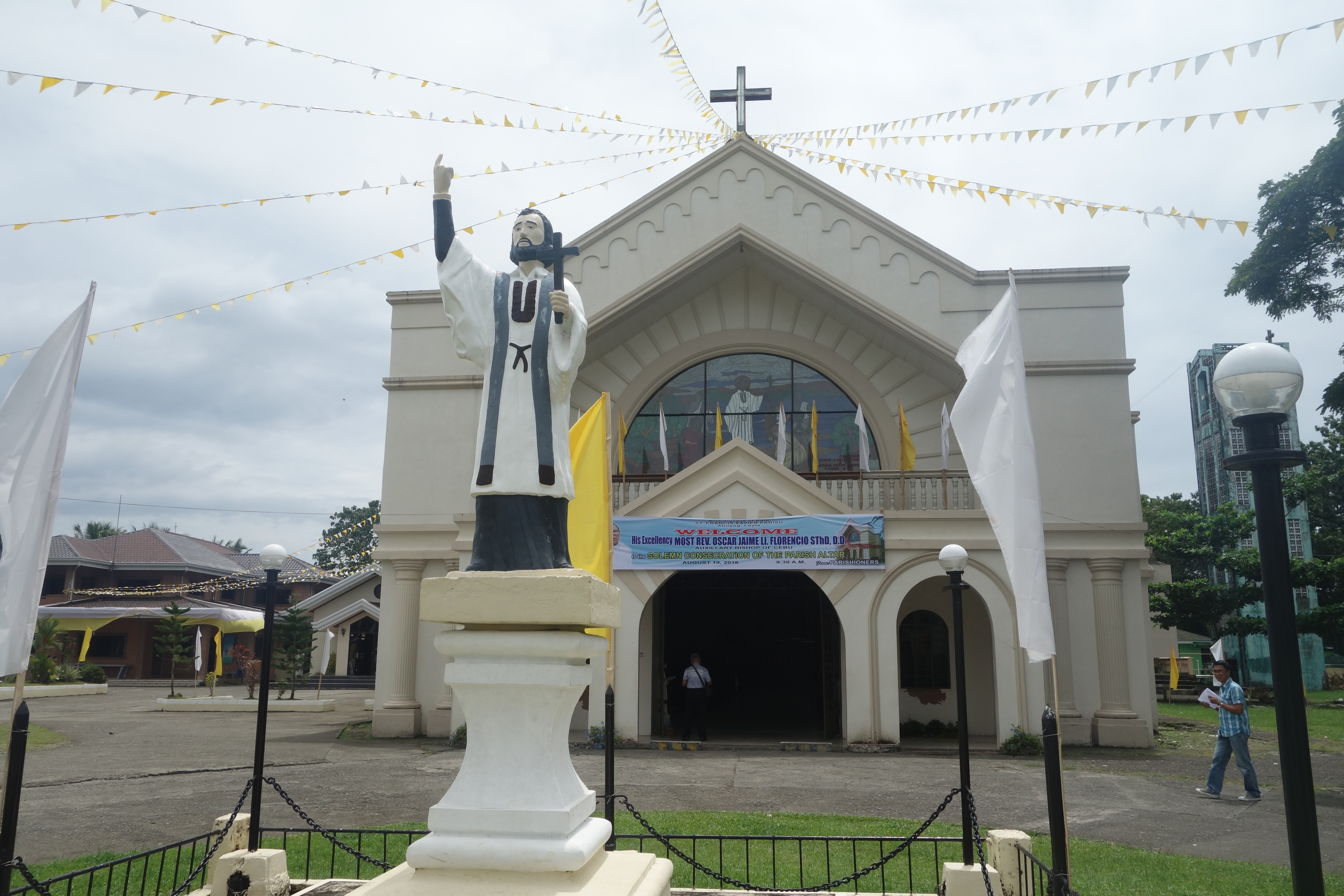
St. Francis Xavier Parish Church

The Church of St. Francis Xavier was first built with nipa, wood and bamboo in 1718 by the Jesuits. Fr. José Herrera and Cipriano Barbasan restored the church and convent, as well as the school and Casa Real. The Augustinians took over the church's supervision in 1768 after it was rebuilt. The church's design was changed in 1781 to conform with the architecture of the Roman Renaissance. A more durable church and convent of masonry was later built, with a galvanized iron roof and wooden floor. In 1965, the church was renovated when an extension was built at the center of the church through the effort of Msgr. Luis D. Caintic who also facilitated the construction of the new bell tower.

Kuapnit Balinsasayao National Park is a 364-hectare campsite located between Abuyog and Baybay. The 7-meter-high, 10-tiered Malaguicay Falls in Barangay Malaguicay has a 3-meter-deep pool. Tib-o Islet and Undersea Water Cave in Barangay Tib-o, Abuyog, is located within the Leyte Gulf area. Lake Bito is the closest lake to the border of Abuyog.

== Healthcare ==
- Abuyog District Hospital
- Abuyog Rural Health Unit
- Balocawehay Rural Health Unit

== Education ==
Abuyog has several secondary and primary schools. The secondary schools include the Abuyog Academy, the Notre Dame of Abuyog, the Kikilo National High School, and others.

The Abuyog Community College (ACC) in Brgy. Guintagbucan, Abuyog, Leyte is a local Government unit sponsored college which under the sponsorship of the Sangguniang Bayan of Abuyog, Leyte through its Resolution Number 110, series of 1978 passed on 21 October 1978, has been authorized by then the Ministry of Education, Culture and Sports (MECS) under permit number 41,s.1979 to open and conduct First Year Level of Liberal Arts course starting school year 1979-1980.

== Notable people ==
- Hillary Diane Andales, astrophysicist and science communicator
- Danny Javier, OPM singer and musician
