= Kuapnit Balinsasayao National Park =

Protected area of the Philippines

- IUCN category V (protected landscape/seascape)
- Location within Visayas Location within Philippines
- Location: Leyte, Philippines
- Nearest city: Tacloban, Leyte, Philippines
- Coordinates: 10°42′N 124°59′E
- Area: 364 hectares (900 acres)
- Established: April 16, 1937
- Governing body: Department of Environment and Natural Resources

Kuapnit Balinsasayao National Park is a protected area of the Philippines located in the municipalities of Abuyog and Baybay in Leyte. The park covers an area of 364 hectares deep within the mountainous forests of Leyte Island some 60 kilometres (37 mi) south of Tacloban via the Maharlika Highway. It was declared a national park on April 16, 1937 by virtue of Proclamation No. 142.

== Topography and ecology ==
Kuapnit Balinsasayao National Park lies at the southern fringe of the Anonang-Lobi Range that runs north to south through western Leyte. This mountain range consists of the highest peaks in Leyte Island including Mount Burauen Graben, Mount Camaiyak and Mount Lobi, the highest at 1,346 m. Mount Maganjan at 754 m. is the most prominent peak nearest to the park.

The park is covered in most parts by old-growth forest. It is home to three bird species endemic to the Eastern Visayas region, the Samar hornbill, Visayan broadbill, and yellow-breasted tailorbird. The Philippine deer, Philippine warty pig and tarsier are also found here.

== See also ==
- List of national parks of the Philippines
