= Hillary Diane Andales =

Filipino astronomer and astrophysicist

- Born: Cebu City, Philippines
- Education: Massachusetts Institute of Technology; University of Chicago
- Awards: Breakthrough Prize Junior Challenge
- Scientific career
- Fields: Astronomy, astrophysics

Hillary Diane Andales is a Filipino astronomer and astrophysicist who focuses on science communication. She placed first in the 2017 Breakthrough Prize Junior Challenge with an entry explaining reference frames within the theory of relativity.

== Early life and education ==
Andales was raised in Abuyog, Leyte. Growing up, Andales' parents encouraged her to read and learn about science, even introducing her to quantum mechanics at a young age. In 2013, her family's home was destroyed by Super Typhoon Yolanda (also known as Typhoon Haiyan), causing her and her family to have hang onto the underside of their house for hours while the storm surged. She cites this storm as leading her to better appreciate science and science communication, noting that more understanding and communication about the storm could have saved countless lives. Andales attended and graduated from the Philippine Science High School Eastern Visayas Campus.

In 2016, she placed third in the Breakthrough Prize Junior Challenge with a submission on path integral formulation. The prize came with a $100,000 grant for laboratory equipment for her high school, which was also damaged in Typhoon Yolanda. In 2017, she entered again in the Breakthrough Junior Challenge and placed first out of 11,000 entries from across 178 different countries. Her entry explained reference frames within the theory of relativity using Usain Bolt and car horns as illustrative examples. The prize included a scholarship for her, additional lab equipment for her school, and a monetary award for her teacher as well. The award ceremony was hosted by Morgan Freeman who called Andales an "incredible Science communicator".

Andales received offers and scholarships from multiple universities. While studying at MIT, Andales wrote articles for NOIRLab, an optical and infrared telescope observatory. She graduated from the Massachusetts Institute of Technology in 2023 with a degree in physics. She is currently pursuing a PhD in astronomy and astrophysics at the University of Chicago.

== Science communication ==
Andales cites a strong belief in the "transformative power" of science communication. She aims to make education more accessible by helping the younger generation have a better appreciation of science, stating: "I want to break the stereotype that science is tough. I want to dispel that."

== Awards and honors ==
- In 2016, Andales won the Special Prize (third) in the Breakthrough Prize Junior Challenge
- In 2017, Andales placed first in the Breakthrough Prize Junior Challenge
- In 2021, Andales was named an MIT Burchard Scholar
