= Paoay =

Municipality in Ilocos Norte, Philippines

- Municipality
- Municipality of Paoay
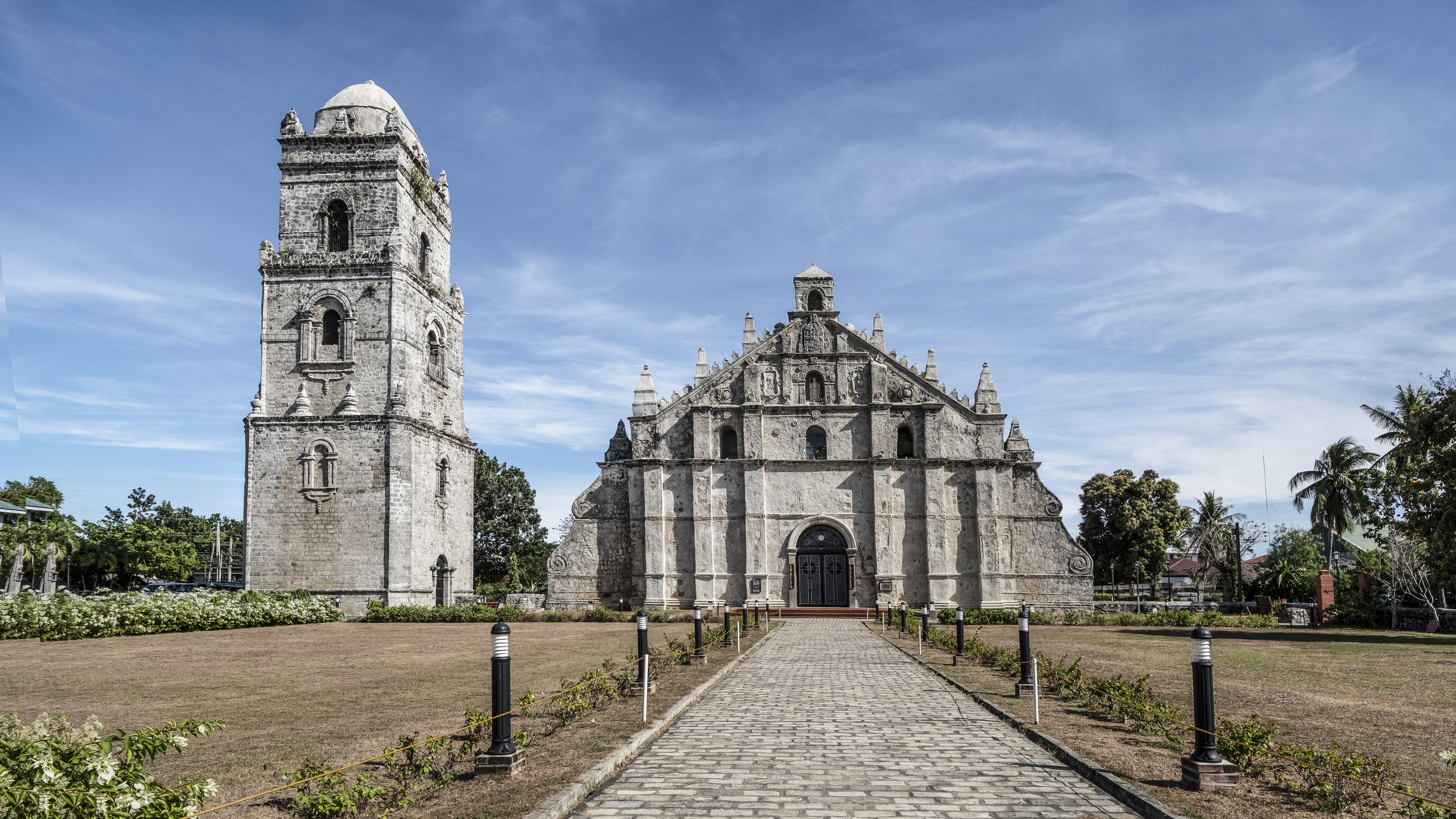
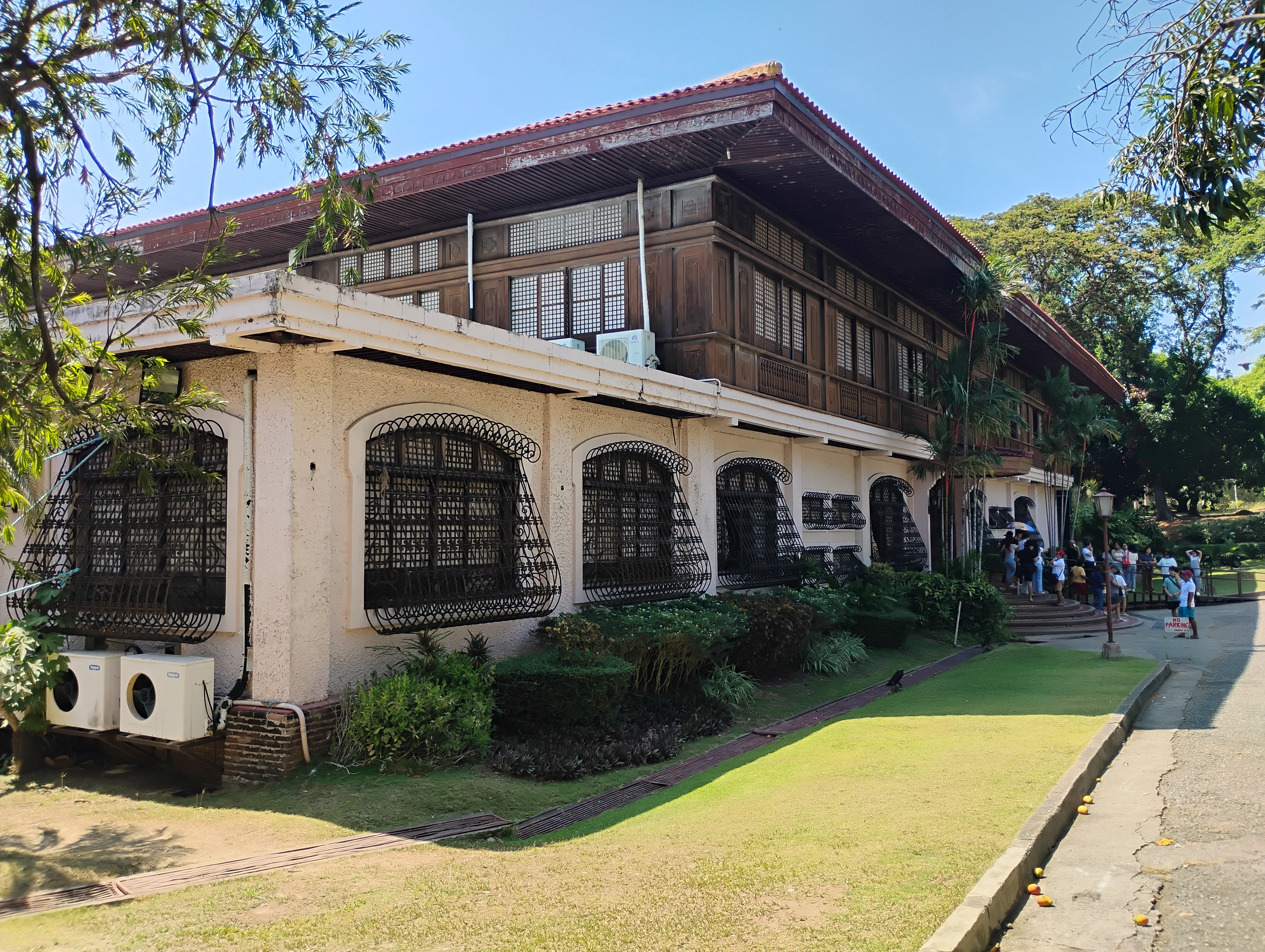
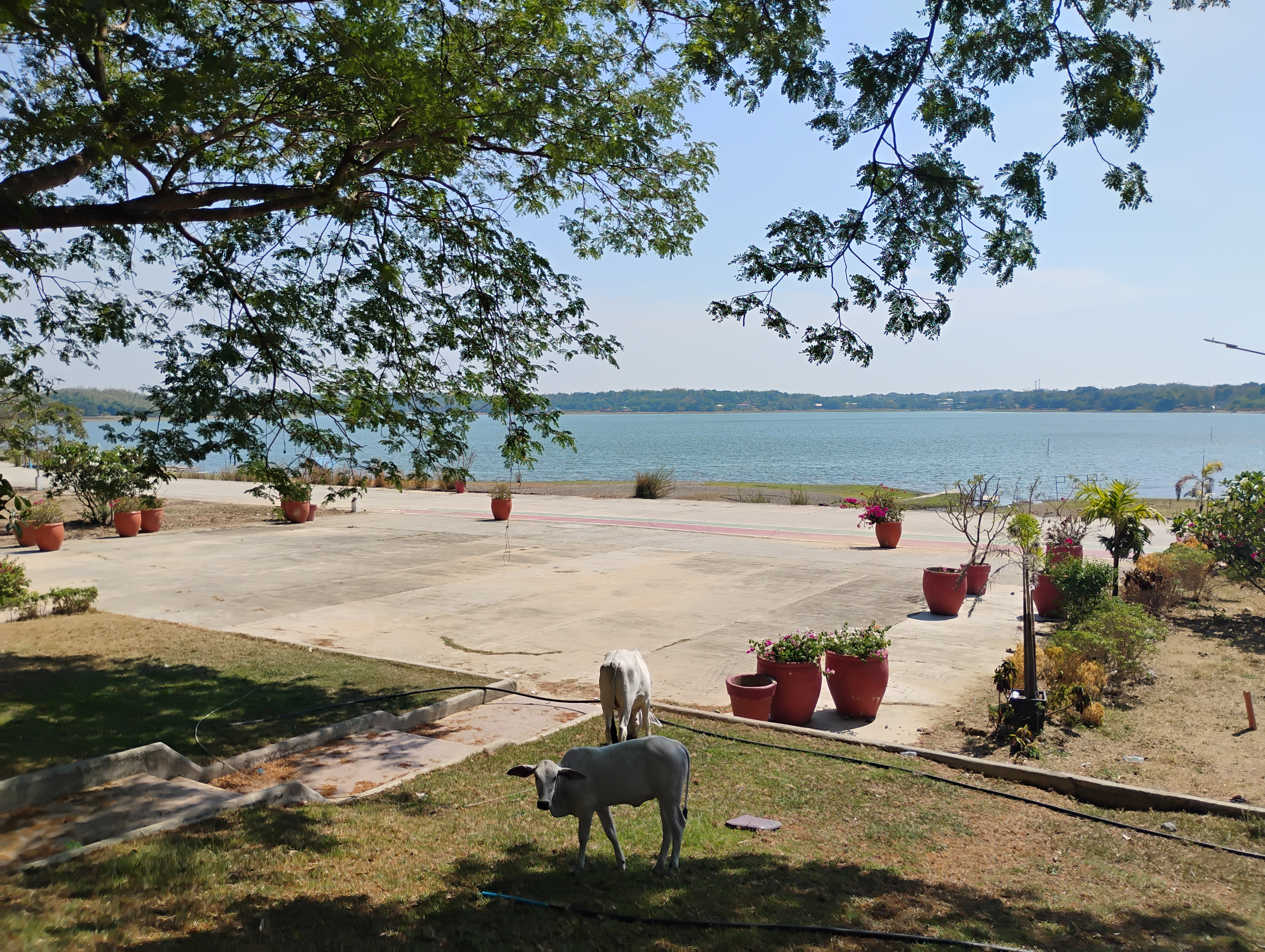
- Paoay Church Malacañang of the North Paoay Lake

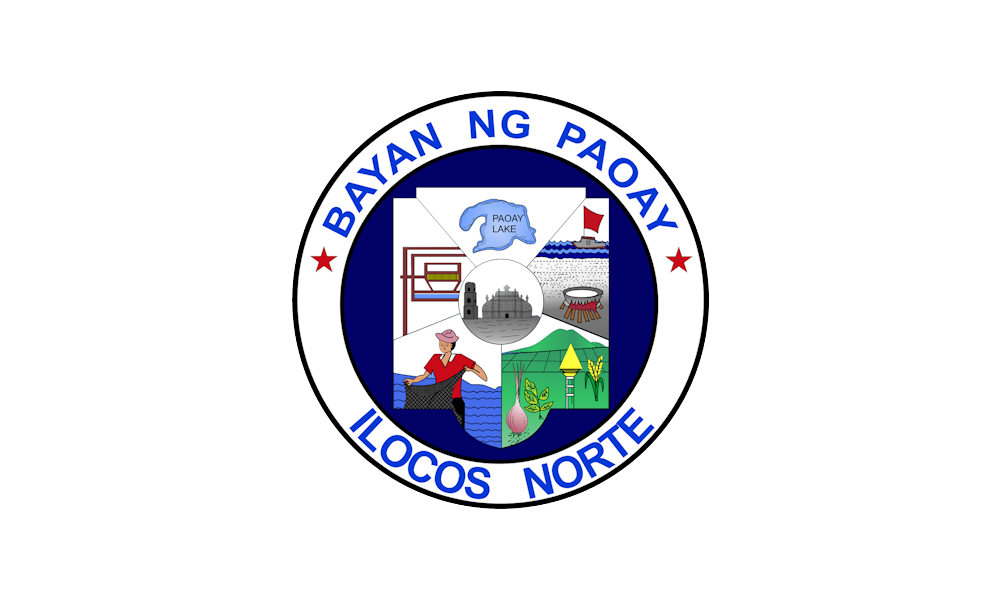
- Flag Seal

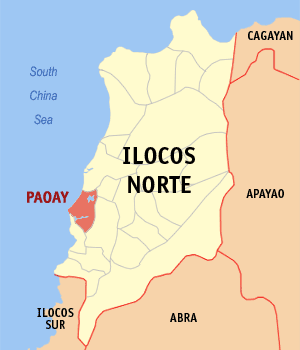
- Map of Ilocos Norte with Paoay highlighted
- Interactive map of Paoay
- Location within the Philippines
- Coordinates: 18°03′45″N 120°31′13″E
- Country: Philippines
- Region: Ilocos Region
- Province: Ilocos Norte
- District: 2nd district
- Barangays: 31 (see Barangays)

Government
  - Type: Sangguniang Bayan
  - Mayor: Shiella A. Galano
  - Vice Mayor: Leah R. Buduan
  - Representative: Eugenio Angelo M. Barba
  - Municipal Council: Members: Efren V. Valdez; Rosemarie D. Castillo; Dante B. Langaman; Philip G. Bagasani; Edgar C. Padayao; Alfonso Conrado E. Diaz; Mary Jane A. Casil; Pacifico T. Clemente, Jr.; Romel R. Ragual (ABC President); Krizette Charm G. Cabel (SK Federated President)
  - Electorate: 17,720 voters (2025)

Area
  - Total: 76.24 km^{2} (29.44 sq mi)
- Elevation: 20 m (66 ft)
- Highest elevation: 87 m (285 ft)
- Lowest elevation: 0 m (0 ft)

Population (2024 census)
  - Total: 24,204
  - Density: 317.5/km^{2} (822.2/sq mi)
  - Households: 6,233

Economy
  - Income class: 2nd municipal income class
  - Poverty incidence: 4.11% (2023)
  - Revenue: ₱ 207 million (2024)
  - Assets: ₱ 783.1 million (2024)
  - Expenditure: ₱ 152.8 million (2024)
  - Liabilities: ₱ 108.8 million (2024)

Service provider
  - Electricity: Ilocos Norte Electric Cooperative (INEC)
- Time zone: UTC+8 (PST)
- ZIP code: 2902
- PSGC: 0102816000
- IDD : area code: +63 (0)77
- Native languages: Ilocano; Tagalog
- Feast date: May 5
- Patron saint: Augustine of Hippo

Paoay, officially the Municipality of Paoay (Ilocano: Ili ti Paoay; Filipino: Bayan ng Paoay), is a municipality in the province of Ilocos Norte, Philippines. According to the 2024 census, it has a population of 24,204 people.

== History ==
In 1701, Paoay was established as a municipality by virtue of a Royal Decree that also designated Don Martin Guiang as its founding head. He served in this capacity as Kapitan Bosar from 1701 to 1704.

== Geography ==
The Municipality of Paoay is home to the Paoay Lake, the largest lake in Ilocos Norte, and Paoay Church, a UNESCO World Heritage site.

Paoay is situated 19.810 kilometres (12.309 mi) from the provincial capital Laoag, and 466.19 kilometres (289.68 mi) from the country's capital city of Manila.

=== Barangays ===
Paoay is politically subdivided into 31 barangays. Each barangay consists of puroks and some have sitios.

- Bacsil
- Cabagoan
- Cabangaran
- Callaguip
- Cayubog
- Dolores
- Laoa
- Masintoc
- Monte
- Mumulaan
- Nagbacalan
- Nalasin
- Nanguyudan
- Oaig-Upay-Abulao
- Pambaran
- Pannaratan (Poblacion)
- Paratong
- Pasil
- Salbang (Poblacion)
- San Agustin
- San Blas (Poblacion)
- San Juan
- San Pedro
- San Roque (Poblacion)
- Sangladan Poblacion (Nalbuan)
- Santa Rita (Poblacion)
- Sideg
- Suba
- Sungadan
- Surgui
- Veronica

=== Climate ===
Climate data for Paoay, Ilocos Norte
| Month | Jan | Feb | Mar | Apr | May | Jun | Jul | Aug | Sep | Oct | Nov | Dec | Year |
|---|---|---|---|---|---|---|---|---|---|---|---|---|---|
| Mean daily maximum °C (°F) | 31 (88) | 32 (90) | 33 (91) | 34 (93) | 34 (93) | 34 (93) | 33 (91) | 32 (90) | 32 (90) | 33 (91) | 32 (90) | 31 (88) | 33 (91) |
| Mean daily minimum °C (°F) | 19 (66) | 20 (68) | 21 (70) | 23 (73) | 24 (75) | 24 (75) | 24 (75) | 24 (75) | 24 (75) | 23 (73) | 22 (72) | 21 (70) | 22 (72) |
| Average rainfall mm (inches) | 6.2 (0.24) | 11.7 (0.46) | 10.1 (0.40) | 14 (0.6) | 192.7 (7.59) | 258.9 (10.19) | 470.9 (18.54) | 475.9 (18.74) | 405.7 (15.97) | 92.5 (3.64) | 44.8 (1.76) | 3 (0.1) | 1,986.4 (78.23) |
| Average rainy days | 3 | 2 | 2 | 2 | 12 | 15 | 20 | 20 | 17 | 10 | 6 | 3 | 112 |
Source: World Weather Online

== Demographics ==
Population census of Paoay
| Year | Pop. | ±% p.a. |
|---|---|---|
| 1903 | 12,743 | — |
| 1918 | 16,639 | +1.79% |
| 1939 | 11,867 | −1.60% |
| 1948 | 11,257 | −0.58% |
| 1960 | 13,189 | +1.33% |
| 1970 | 15,218 | +1.44% |
| 1975 | 15,994 | +1.00% |
| 1980 | 17,016 | +1.25% |
| 1990 | 20,680 | +1.97% |
| 1995 | 21,253 | +0.51% |
| 2000 | 21,745 | +0.49% |
| 2007 | 23,117 | +0.85% |
| 2010 | 23,956 | +1.31% |
| 2015 | 24,866 | +0.71% |
| 2020 | 25,001 | +0.11% |
| 2024 | 24,204 | −0.77% |
Source: Philippine Statistics Authority

In the 2024 census, the population of Paoay was 24,204 people, with a density of 320 inhabitants per square kilometre or 830 inhabitants per square mile.

== Economy ==
Poverty incidence of Paoay (%)

Source: Philippine Statistics Authority

The main economic source of Paoay is agriculture. Farmers cultivate rice, corn, and garlic. Paoay's aquaculture involves fishing and tilapia production. The municipality is also popular for its weaving industry, known as the Inabel handloom weaving.

== Government ==
=== Local government ===
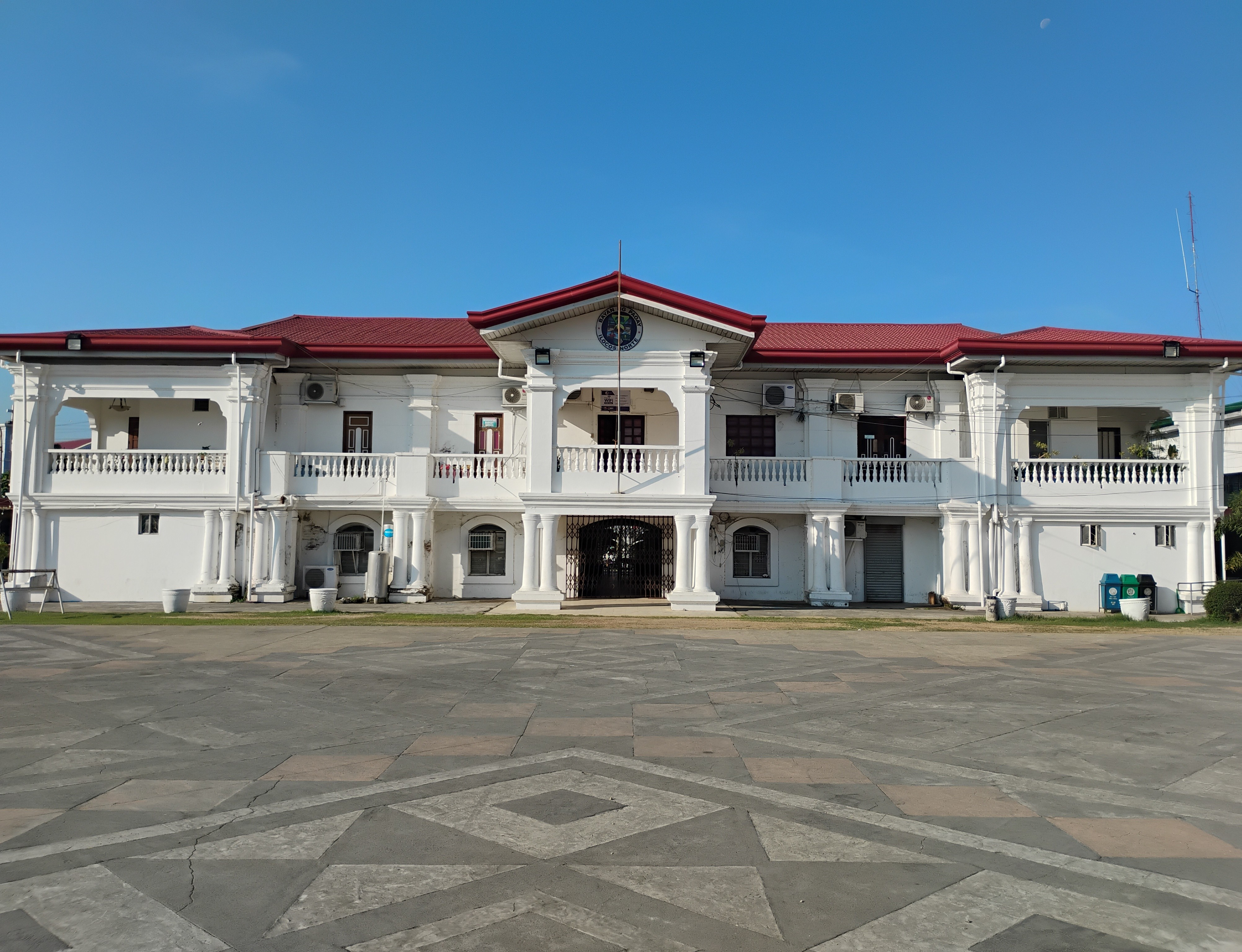
Paoay Municipal Hall

Paoay, belonging to the second congressional district of the province of Ilocos Norte, is governed by a mayor designated as its local chief executive and by a municipal council as its legislative body in accordance with the Local Government Code. The mayor, vice mayor, and the councilors are elected directly by the people through an election which is being held every three years.

=== Elected officials ===
Members of the Municipal Council (2025–2028)
| Position | Name |
|---|---|
| Congressman | Eugenio Angelo M. Barba |
| Mayor | Shiella A. Galano |
| Vice-Mayor | Leah R. Buduan |
| Councilors | Efren V. Valdez |
| Councilors | Rosemarie D. Castillo |
| Councilors | Dante B. Langaman |
| Councilors | Philip G. Bagasani |
| Councilors | Edgar C. Padayao |
| Councilors | Alfonso Conrado E. Diaz |
| Councilors | Mary Jane A. Casil |
| Councilors | Pacifico T. Clemente, Jr. |
| ABC President | Romel R. Ragual |
| SK Federated President | Krizette Charm G. Cabel |

== Tourism ==
Paoay Lake as seen from Malacañang of the North

=== Paoay Lake ===
Paoay Lake is the largest lake in Ilocos Norte. Legend has it that it was the site of a prosperous barangay, called San Juan de Sahagún (Saint John of Sahagún), that sank following a massive earthquake. The freshwater lake and its 1-kilometre (0.62 mi) surroundings was declared a national park in 1969. In 2025, the park was further designated as a Protected Area to be known as the Paoay Lake Protected Landscape.

=== Malacañang of the North ===
On the shores of the lake lies a mansion once used by the Marcoses. Called Malacañang of the North, it is now a museum that is open to the public. Adjacent to the mansion is the Paoay Golf Course.

Paoay Church

=== Paoay Church ===
The Paoay Church was completed in 1710 and is famous for its distinctive Earthquake Baroque architecture. It is declared as a National Cultural Treasure by the Philippine government in 1973 and a UNESCO World Heritage Site under the collective group of Baroque Churches of the Philippines in 1993.

== Education ==
The Paoay Schools District Office governs all public and private schools within the municipality.

=== Primary and elementary schools ===
- Bacsil Elementary School
- Evangelista Elementary School
- Monte Elementary School
- Mumulaan Elementary School
- Nagbacalan Elementary School
- Nagbacalan West Elementary School
- Nalasin Elementary School
- Nanguyudan Elementary School
- Paoay Central Elementary School
- Paoay East Central Elementary School
- Paoay Faith Academy
- Pasil Elementary School
- Salbang Elementary School
- Sideg Elementary School
- Suba Elementary School

=== Secondary schools ===
- Paoay Lake National High School
- Paoay National High School
- Paoay North Institute
- Malaguip Integrated School

== Gallery ==
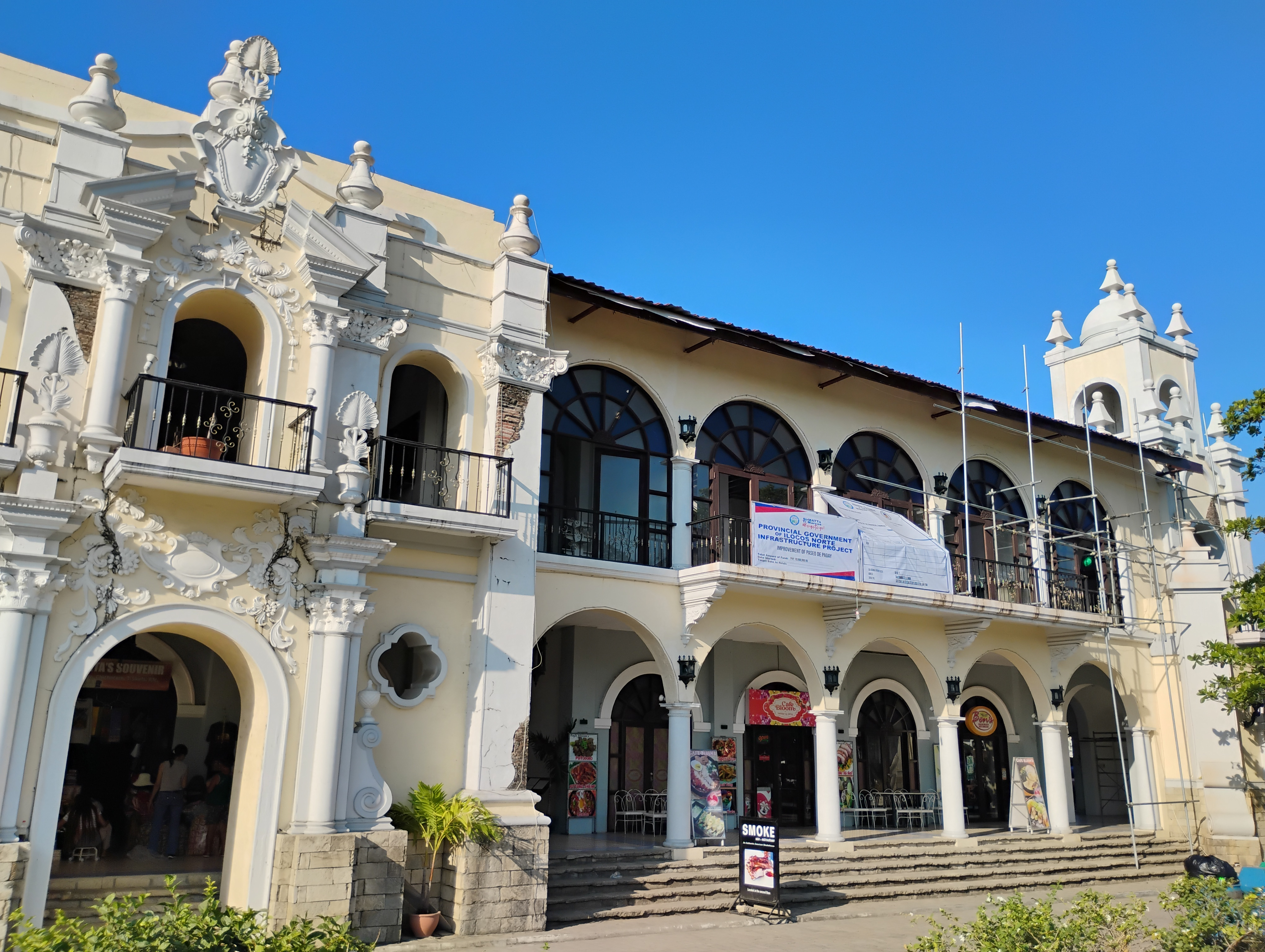
Paseo de Paoay

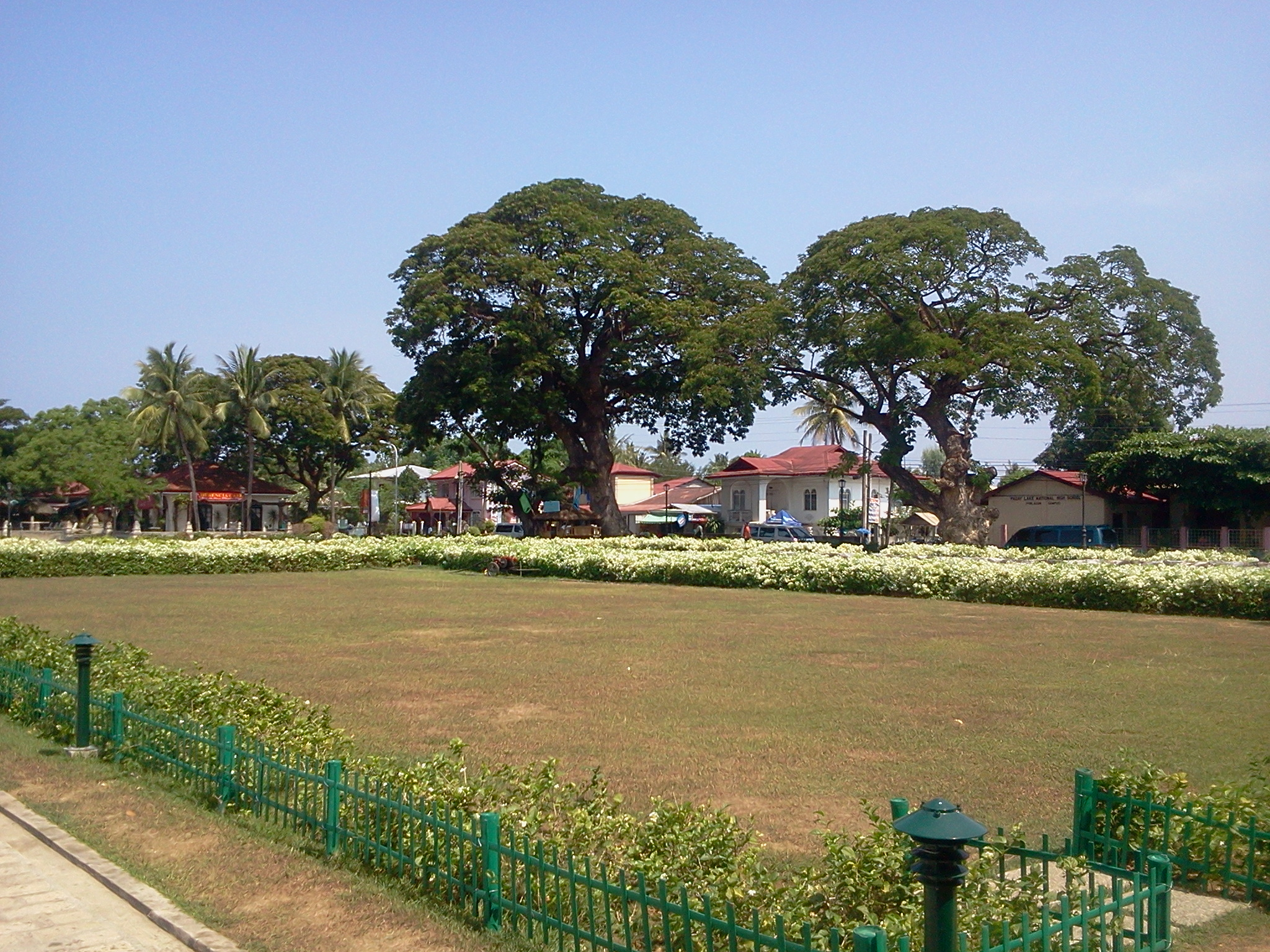
View of Poblacion Area

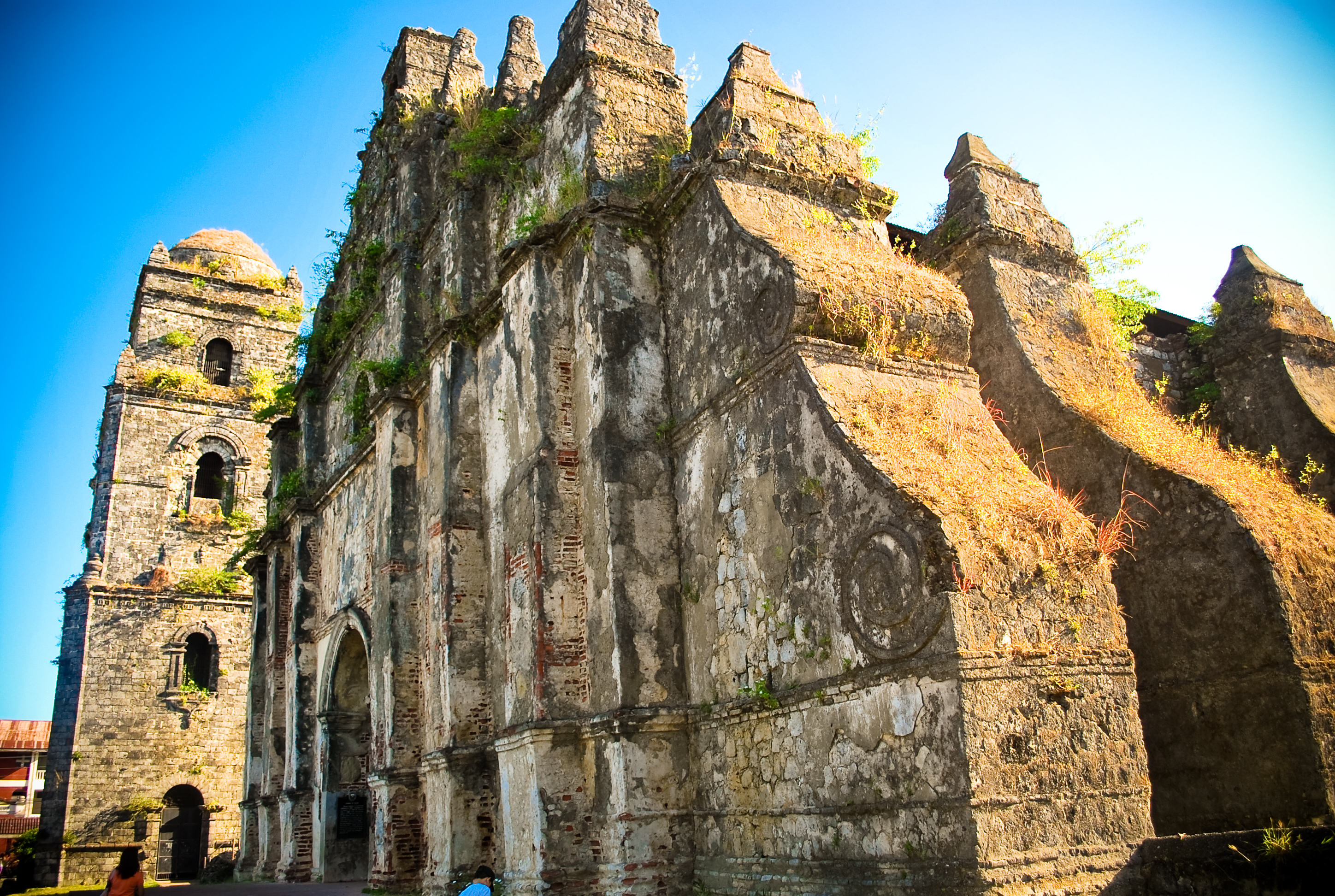
Buttress of the Paoay Church

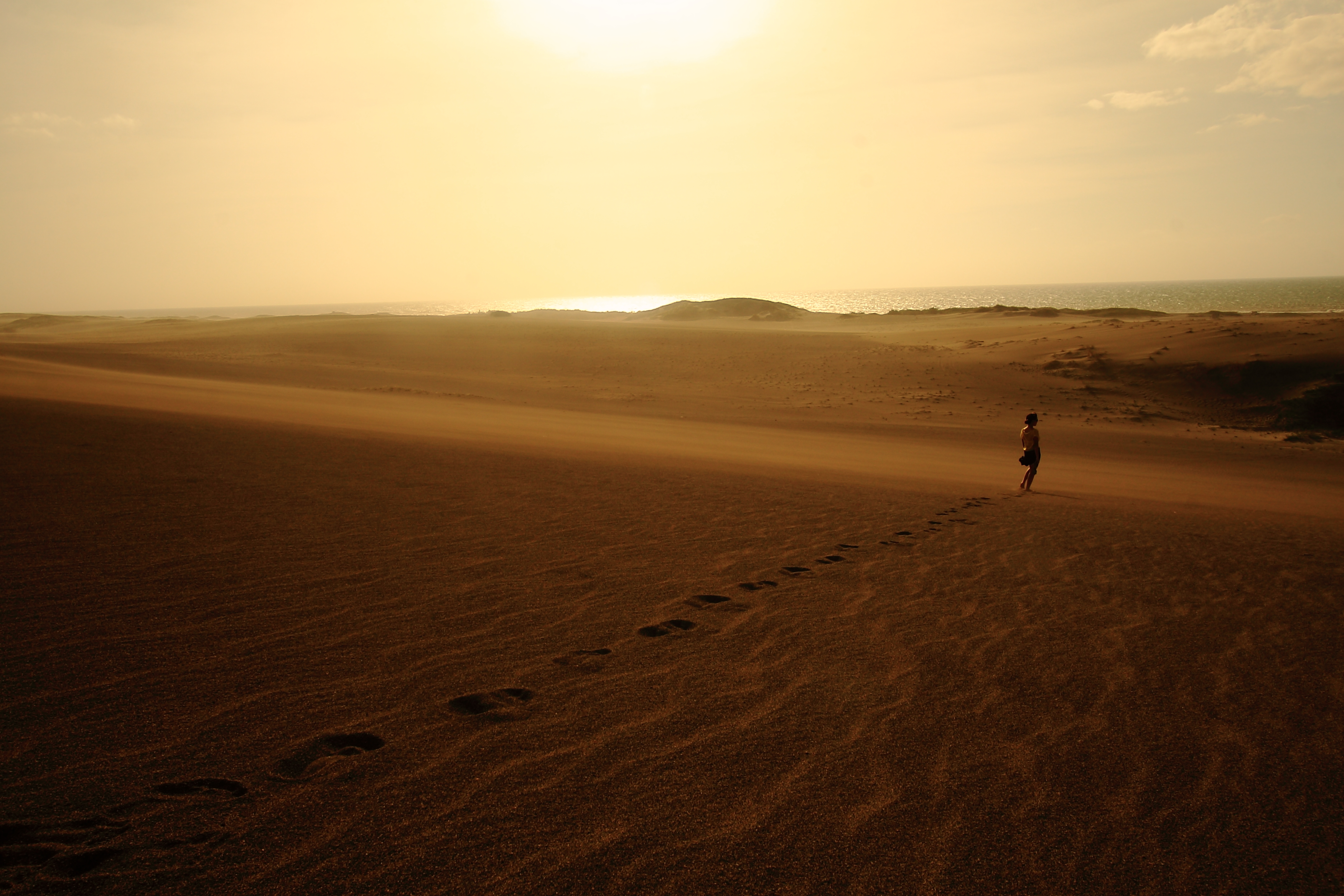
Paoay sand dunes

Aerial view of San Agustin Church and Paseo de Paoay

== Notable personalities ==
- Conchita Carpio-Morales, a Filipino judge
- Mans Carpio, a Filipino lawyer
