= Bangan Hill National Park =

National park in the Philippines

- IUCN category II (national park)
- Location within Philippines
- Location: Nueva Vizcaya, Philippines
- Nearest city: Santiago City, Philippines
- Coordinates: 16°25′N 121°19′E
- Area: 13.90 hectares (34.3 acres)
- Established: March 29, 1995
- Governing body: Department of Environment and Natural Resources

Bangan Hill National Park is a protected area in the Philippines, located in the municipality of Bayombong, Nueva Vizcaya, in Cagayan Valley. The park covers 13.90 hectares. It was declared a national park in 1995 by virtue of Republic Act No. 7954.

The park is a historic and cultural landmark of Nueva Vizcaya, the site of the province's first mass in 1739, officiated by Father Pedro Freire. The event also marked the founding of the municipality of Bayombong. The park is also the site of the annual "Stations of the Cross" staged by the Diocese of Bayombong during the Lenten season using live actors depicting the last moments leading to Jesus Christ's crucifixion. It is also an ideal year-round destination for hiking enthusiasts, with the observation deck commanding a great view of the expanse of the surrounding valley formed by the Caraballo and Cordillera Central mountains.

== See also ==
- List of national parks of the Philippines
