= Blessed Virgin of the Fort =

Marian Image in the Philippines

Our Lady of the Triumph of the Cross Virgin of the Fort, Birhen sa Cotta
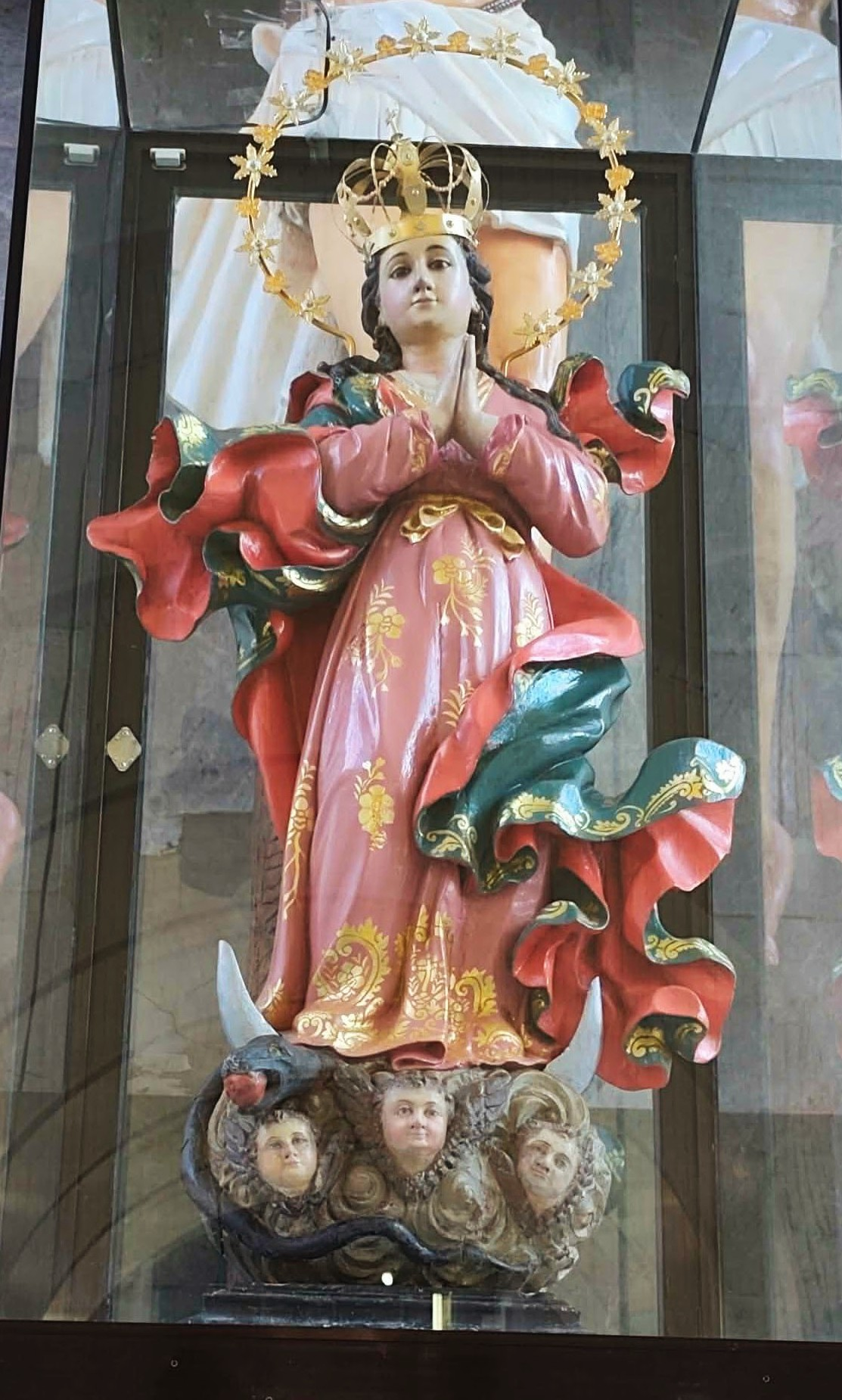
- The original image in the Ozamiz Cathedral
- Location: Ozamiz City, Misamis Occidental, Philippines
- Date: 1756
- Type: Wood statue
- Shrine: Metropolitan Cathedral of the Immaculate Conception, Ozamiz
- Patronage: Ozamiz; Misamis Occidental; Archdiocese of Ozamis
- Attributes: Pink and blue robes being blown by the wind, 3 angels, a crescent moon, a serpent underfoot biting a fruit
- Feast day: July 16; December 8

Our Lady of the Immaculate Conception and of the Triumph of the Cross of Panguil Bay (Spanish: Nuestra Señora de la Inmaculada Concepción y del Triunfo de la Cruz de Migpangi, Latin: Nostra Domina de Conceptionis Immaculata et Crux Invictus de Panguensis), also known as Our Lady of the Triumph of the Cross (Spanish: Nuestra Señora del Triunfo de la Cruz) and informally known as the Virgin of the Fort (Cebuano: Birhen sa Cotta), is an 18th-century wooden image of the Blessed Virgin Mary venerated as patroness at the Metropolitan Cathedral of the Immaculate Conception in Ozamiz City, Misamis Occidental in the Philippines.

The archbishop of Ozamis, Martin Jumoad, granted an episcopal coronation to the image, which was announced on 17 May 2026, and was crowned on 8 July 2026. The Marian image was named after its original sanctuary, the Fuerte de la Concepción y del Triunfo of Panguil Bay. The image was notably recovered by longtime preservationists after years of purported theft and disappearance.

== Description ==
The wooden image shows the Virgin Mary in a Rococo style, standing on a cloud, wearing pink and blue robes, carved as if being blown by the wind, with a crown and an aureole. At her feet are three angels, a crescent moon, and a serpent under her feet biting a fruit. The image is 35 inches from head to toe, while her crown and the cloud beneath her feet add an additional foot, for a total of 3 feet and 11 inches. During the image's restoration prior its return to Ozamiz, the wood used was determined to be Batikulíng (Litsea leytensis) and Narra (Pterocarpus indicus), trees native to the Philippines, with the former being endemic. The image is approximately 270 years old.

== History ==
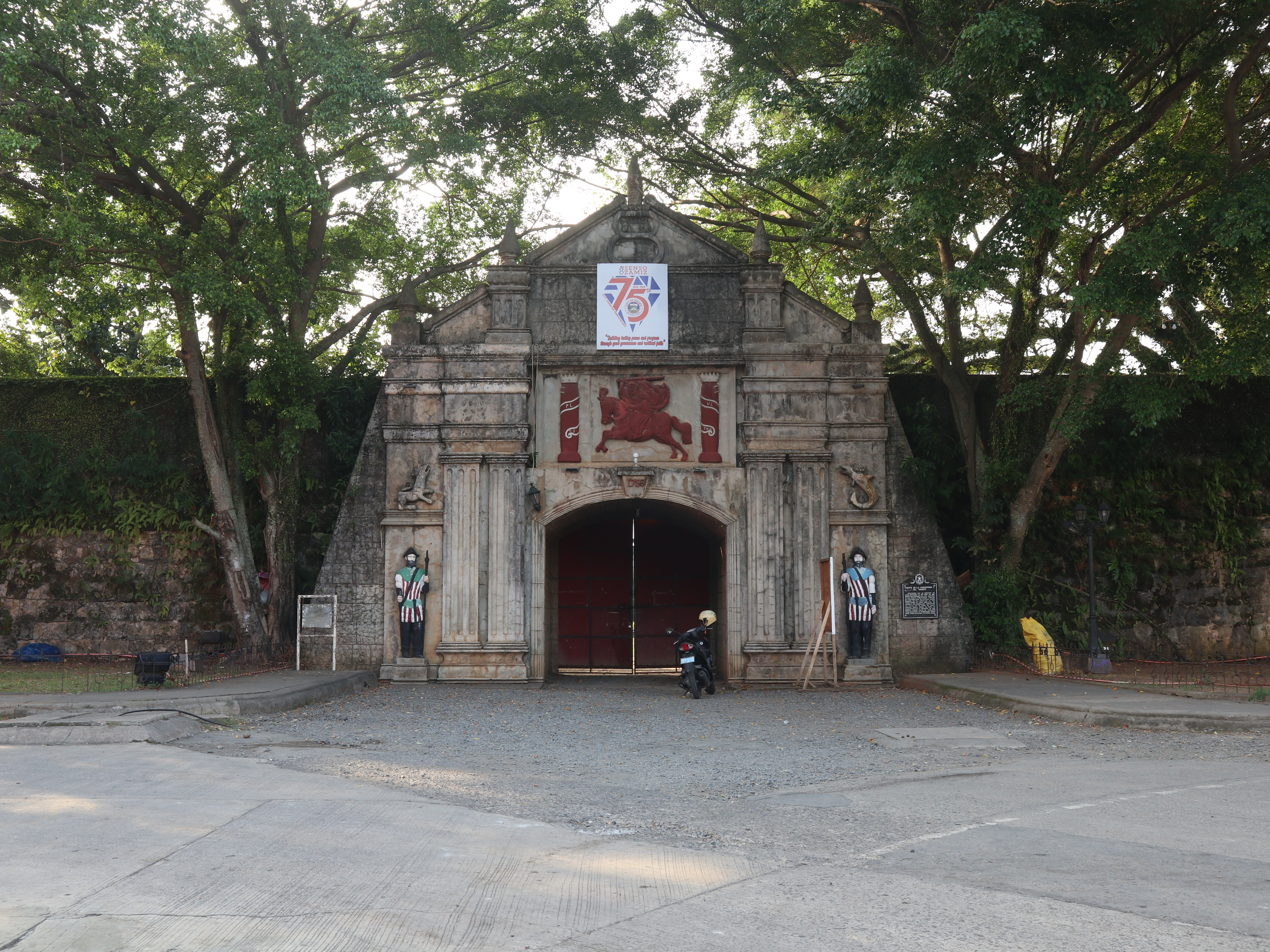
Fuerte de la Concepcion y del Triunfo, the original home of the image

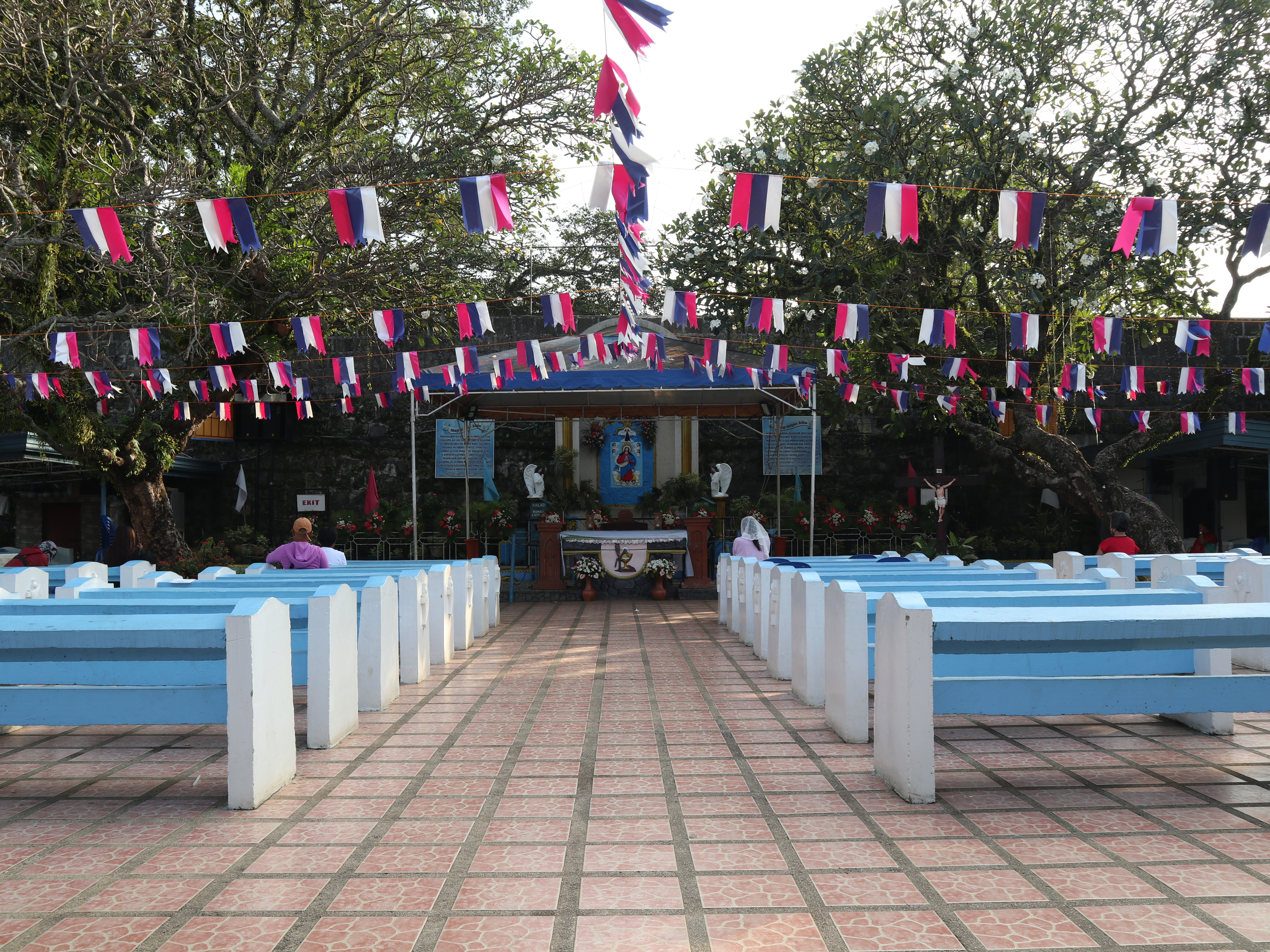
Archdiocesan Marian Shrine of the Birhen sa Cotta

The image was brought to Misamis either during construction of the fort in 1756 or after it was finished. The fort was built by Father José Ducos, SJ, to serve as an outpost of Spanish suzerainty in Muslim Mindanao. Soon after, Father Ducos placed the fort and the town that grew around it under the patronage of the Blessed Virgin Mary, under the title of the Immaculate Conception. The image, originally coloured blue and pink, was enshrined in a chapel built inside the walls of the fort. Outside the south wall of the fort facing the bay is a bas relief image of the Virgin, and its appearance is similar to the painting of Nuestra Señora de la Portería (Our Lady of the Gate) venerated in Ávila, Spain. The relief image shows the Virgin Mary in pink and blue robes, standing on a crescent moon with three angels hovering in a cloud. Above her are a crown and the Holy Spirit in the form of a dove.

Sometime between 1875 and 1884, Jorge Carcabilla, a Spanish priest assigned to Misamis at the time, moved the statue to the town's parish church (now the Metropolitan Cathedral of the Immaculate Conception of Ozamiz) as the chapel and the image were not properly cared for. The image was enshrined in a crystal urna (case) in a side altar. Its feast is customarily observed on July 16, a feast of the Cross in the Mozarabic Rite (which shaped Filipino Catholicism), but is otherwise the feast day of Our Lady of Mount Carmel in the General Roman Calendar. As a result, devotees unaware of the image's origins misidentified the image as Our Lady of Mount Carmel, which led to its repainting in brown and the addition of a Brown Scapular in the early 1930s. On December 8, 1954, the image participated in the Marian Congress in Manila. A few days before the event, the image had been brought to the firm of santero Máximo Vicente for restoration.

In 1955, a 7.4-magnitude earthquake destroyed the church, but the Virgin was found intact in the rubble. When the new cathedral was built, the image was placed on the right side of the altar.

=== Purported theft ===
In 1975, the image was allegedly stolen from the cathedral. Despite multiple efforts from religious organizations, provincial and city officials, and concerned citizens, the image was nowhere to be found for more than four decades. In July 1993, the archdiocese commissioned a replica for public veneration.

=== Recovery of the image ===
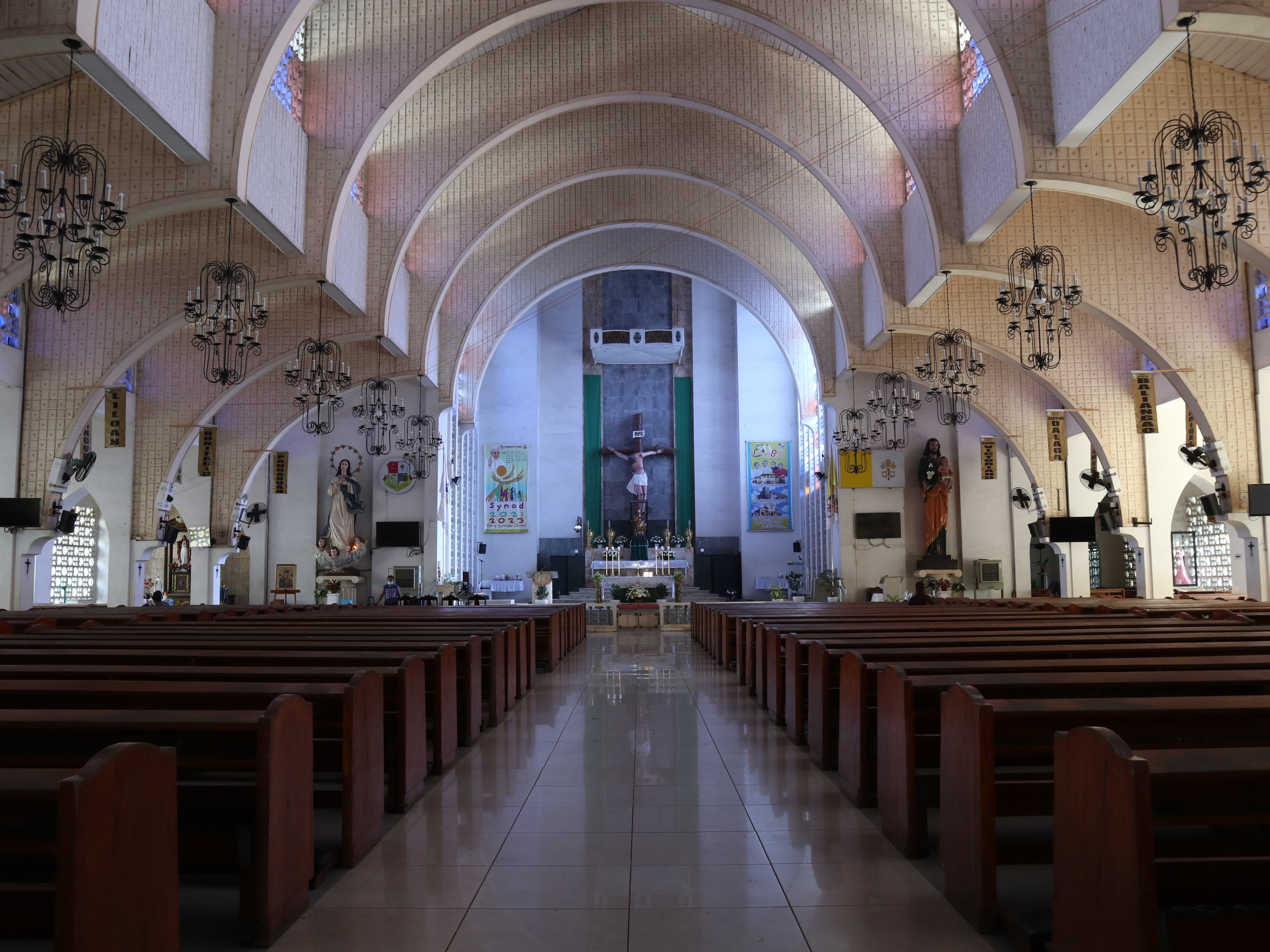
The image enshrined at the main altar of Ozamiz Cathedral

After 42 years, the image of the Virgin was discovered in the Nonesuch Antique Fair in Makati City in October 2017. The image was found in poor condition, with visible cracks and its paint peeling off, most notably on the face and hands. The image at the time was under the custody of an antique dealer named Jose Vicente Esposo in Metro Manila. He stated that he acquired the image from a deceased antique dealer. After finding out about the image's origins through research, he had it restored and personally returned it to Ozamiz on December 8, 2017, the Feast of the Immaculate Conception. A procession was held from Ozamiz Airport, to the fort where a Mass was held, and then the cathedral for a thanksgiving Mass. Esposo, recognised as the legal owner, formally turned over the image on permanent loan to the Archdiocese of Ozamis. The image was brought out in procession that night, and later enthroned in a glass case atop the altar for public veneration.

=== Episcopal coronation ===
Announced on May 17, 2026, Archbishop Jumoad granted an episcopal coronation to the image, with the coronation rites performed on July 8 during the archdiocese's diamond jubilee and the 132nd plenary assembly of the Catholic Bishops' Conference of the Philippines. The image underwent restoration in preparation of the event, with its pink and blue robes restored (discovered under the brown paint) following the original Rococo style, while additions were local floral motifs added in gold and a new aureole of twelve stars. The aureole and episcopal crown were designed by Esposo, the image's legal owner. The Mass was presided by Charles John Brown, Papal Nuncio to the Philippines, while Archbishop Jumoad personally crowned the image.
