= 2000 Ozamiz ferry bombing =

Terrorist incident in the Philippines

February 25, 2000 Ozamiz Ferry Bombing
- Location: Panguil Bay, Philippines
- Date: February 25, 2000 (UTC+8)
- Target: Super 5; M/V Our Lady of Mediatrix
- Attack type: Bombing
- Deaths: 44
- Injuries: 100
- Perpetrator: Rogue members of the Moro Islamic Liberation Front

The 2000 Ozamiz ferry Bombing is one of the Philippines' bloodiest bombing incidents. At least 44 people were killed, and more than 100 were wounded.

== Incident ==
On February 25, 2000, large incendiary bombs exploded on three buses of Super Five Transport aboard the M/V Our Lady of Mediatrix ferry as it crossed Panguil Bay from Kolambugan, Lanao del Norte to Ozamiz City. The explosions created a fire which engulfed the bus, spreading to four vehicles behind it. 44 people died and 100 people were injured. The bomb exploded as the ferry was about 20 yards from the pier at Ozamiz.

== Reactions ==
The Moro Islamic Liberation Front (MILF) were among those blamed for the attack. The Armed Forces Chief Angelo Reyes also blamed extortionists. The bombs were allegedly time bombs. The alleged perpetrators were Allan Saumay and Amanodin Dimalna, who were arrested. This action, among other incidents such as a MILF raid in Kauswagan, Lanao del Norte on March 21, 2000, prompted President Joseph Estrada to declare "all-out war" against MILF.
