= Labo National High School =

Public high school in Misamis Occidental, Philippines

Location
- Brgy. Labo, Ozamiz City, Misamis Occidental, Philippines
- Coordinates: 8°10′49″N 123°49′52″E

Information
- Type: Government School
- Motto: "Bringing Inspiration, Bridging Opportunities"
- Established: 1980s
- Principal: Mr. Renato Cagbabanwa
- Color(s): White, Green, Maroon
- Nickname: Labonians

Labo National High School (Labo NHS or LNHS) is a secondary school located at Barangay Labo, Ozamiz City, Misamis Occidental, Philippines. Along with Labo Central School, these are the only educational institutions in Labo.

Most of the students are coming from Labo and the nearby barangays in Ozamiz City and Clarin.

== History ==
The school was founded in the 1980s, with Mr. Elias Lasala Penaco as its founder.
