= Ozamiz =

Component city in Misamis Occidental, Philippines

- Component city
- City of Ozamiz
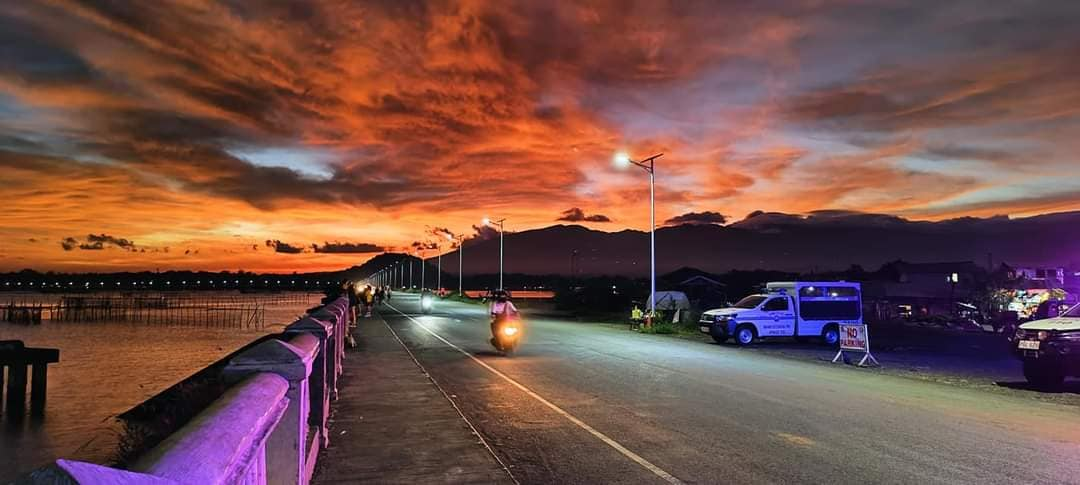
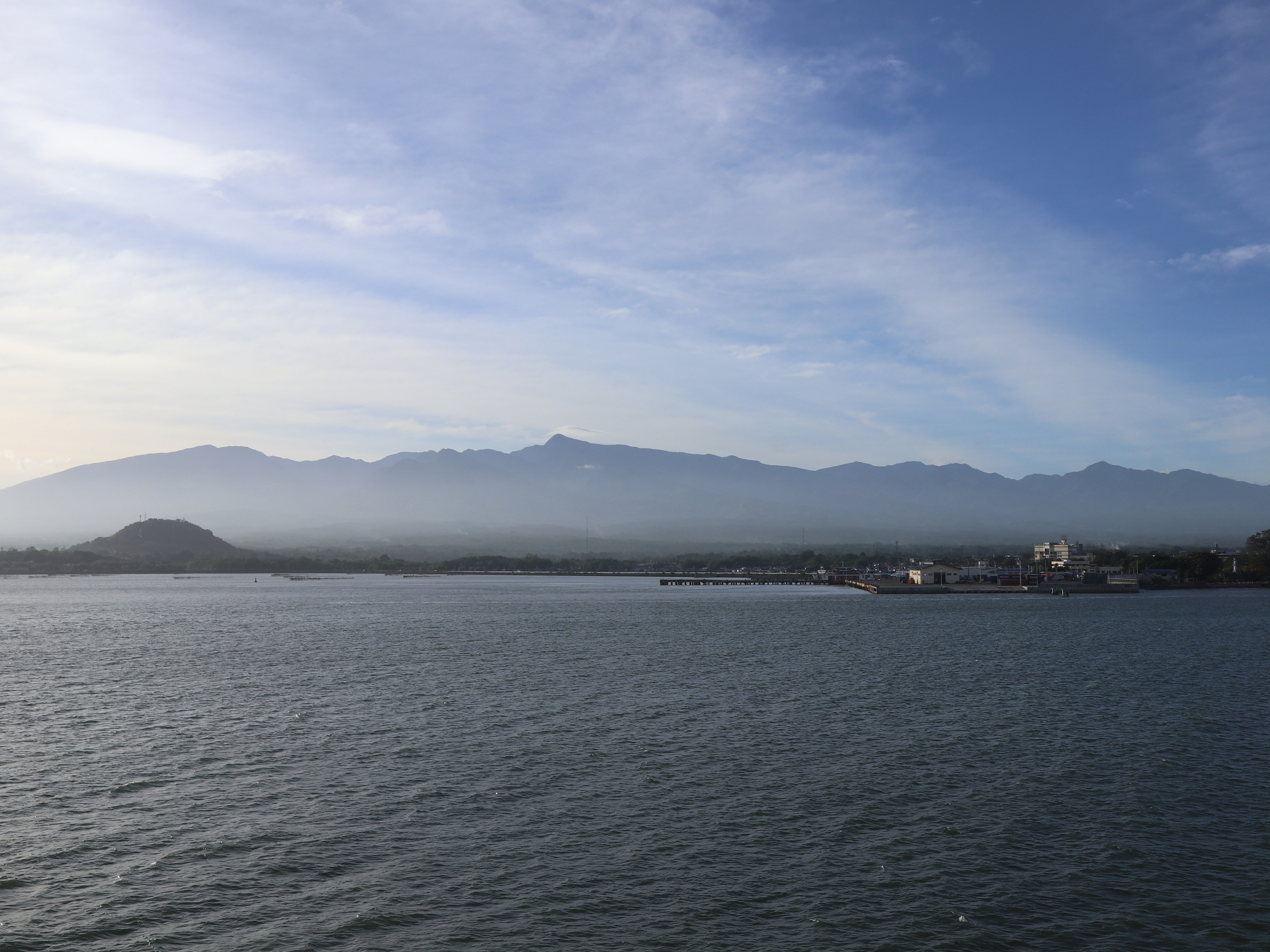
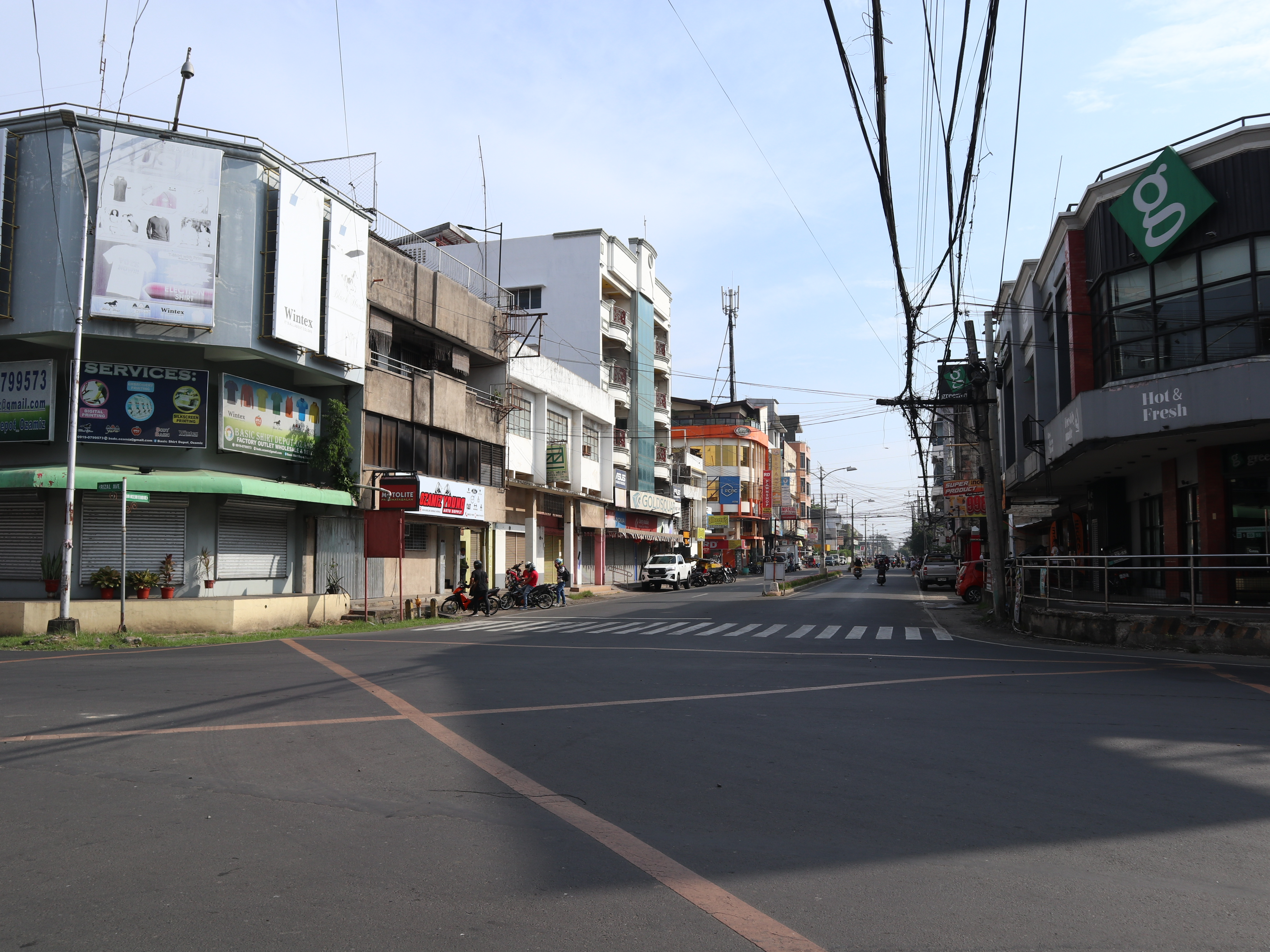
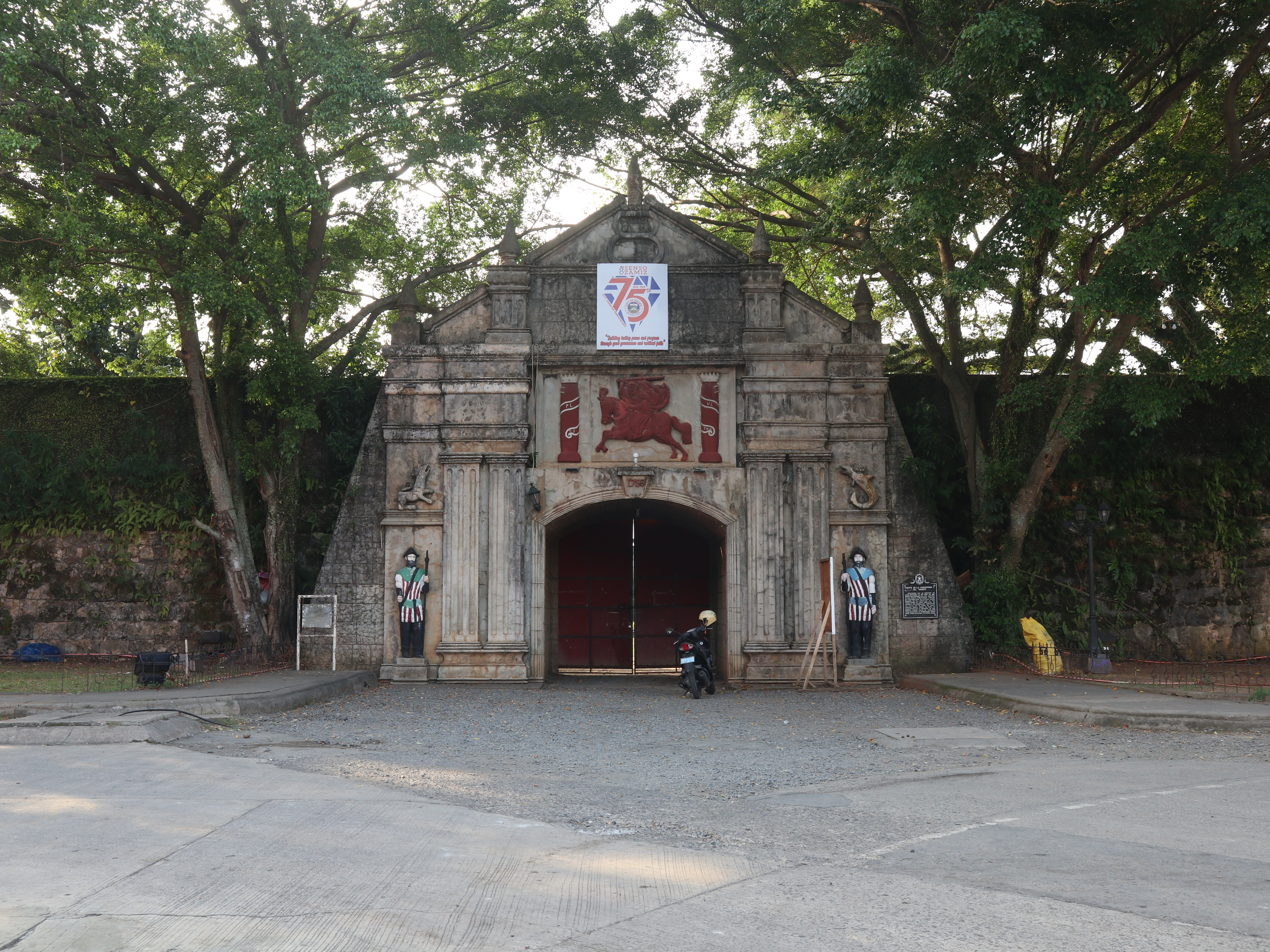
- Ozamiz Coastal Bypass Road View from Panguil Bay Ozamiz City Hall Downtown Ozamiz Fuerte de la Concepcion y del Triunfo

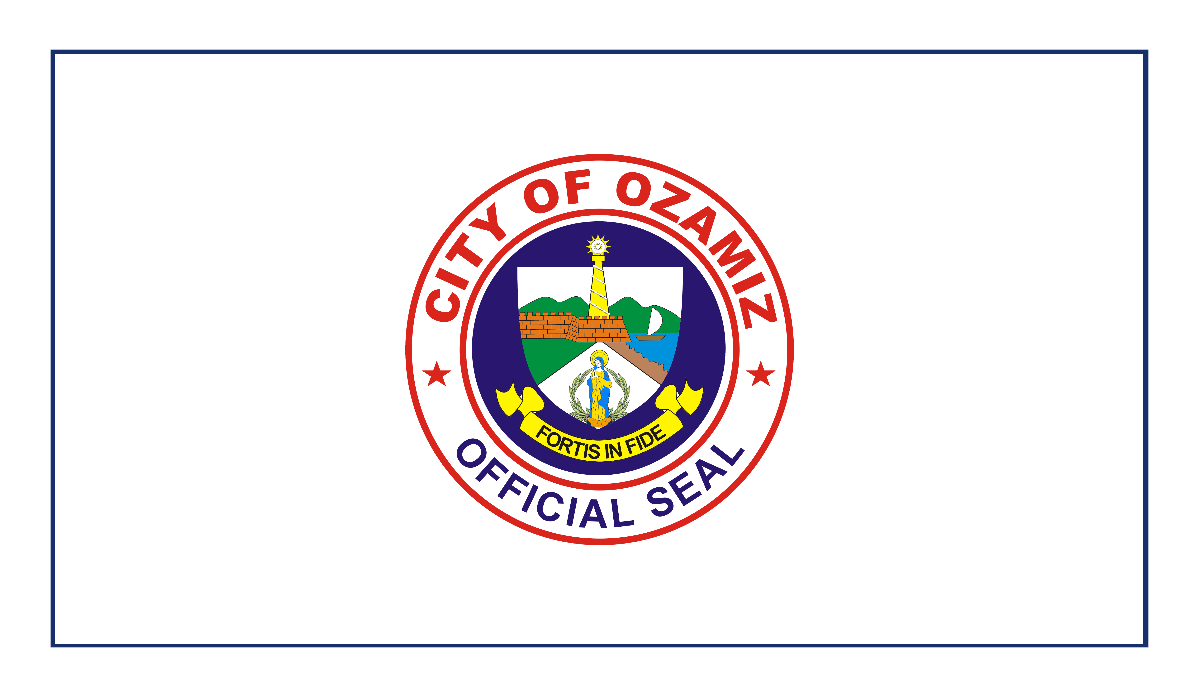
- Flag Seal
- Nicknames: Gem of the Panguil Bay; Gateway to Northwestern Mindanao; Historical, Cultural, and Pilgrimage Destination
- Motto: Fortis in Fide (Latin) 'Strength in Faith'
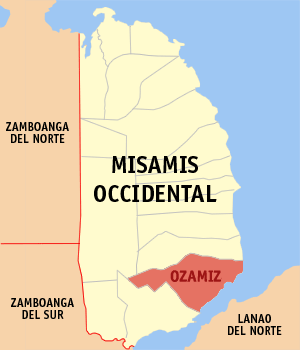
- Map of Misamis Occidental with Ozamiz highlighted
- Interactive map of Ozamiz
- Location within the Philippines
- Coordinates: 8°09′N 123°51′E
- Country: Philippines
- Region: Northern Mindanao
- Province: Misamis Occidental
- District: 2nd district
- Founded: 1756
- Cityhood: July 16, 1948
- Named for: José Ozámiz
- Barangays: 51 (see Barangays)

Government
  - Type: Sangguniang Panlungsod
  - Mayor: Atty. Sam Norman G. Fuentes (Asenso Pinoy Party)
  - Vice Mayor: Simplicia “Bebie” O. Neri (Asenso Pinoy Party)
  - Representative: Sancho Fernando “Ando” F. Oaminal (Lakas)
  - City Council: Members: Lorlie Fuentes-Cipres (NP); Katherine "Kat-Kat" C. Lim (ASPIN); Cecille Y. Co (ASPIN); Marcelo Archie S. Romero II (ASPIN); Roland "Dinky" B. Suizo Jr. (NP); Daniel C. Lao (NP); Juanito "Junjun" B. Saquin Jr. (ASPIN); Marcelian "Mars" C. Tapayan (PDPLBN); Anita "Nene" M. Linsag (PDPLBN); Saulo D. Salvador (PDPLBN)
  - Electorate: 99,937 voters (2025)

Area
  - Total: 169.95 km^{2} (65.62 sq mi)
- Elevation: 216 m (709 ft)
- Highest elevation: 1,923 m (6,309 ft)
- Lowest elevation: 0 m (0 ft)

Population (2024 census)
  - Total: 143,620
  - Density: 845.07/km^{2} (2,188.7/sq mi)
  - Households: 32,933
- Demonym: Ozamiznon

Economy
  - Income class: 2nd city income class
  - Poverty incidence: 23.18% (2023)
  - Revenue: ₱ 1,226 million (2024)
  - Assets: ₱ 2,540 million (2024)
  - Expenditure: ₱ 942.1 million (2024)
  - Liabilities: ₱ 408.5 million (2024)

Service provider
  - Electricity: Misamis Occidental 2 Electric Cooperative (MOELCI 2)
- Time zone: UTC+8 (PST)
- ZIP code: 7200
- PSGC: 104210000
- IDD : area code: +63 (0)88
- Native languages: Subanon; Cebuano; Tagalog
- Feast date: July 16; December 8
- Catholic diocese: Archdiocese of Ozamis
- Patron saint: List: • Immaculate Conception; • Blessed Virgin of the Fort
- Website: ozamizcity.com

Ozamiz, officially the City of Ozamiz (Cebuano: Dakbayan sa Ozamiz; Filipino: Lungsod ng Ozamiz), is a component city in the province of Misamis Occidental, Philippines. According to the 2024 census, it has a population of 143,620 people making it the most populous city in Misamis Occidental.

Although occasionally spelled as Ozamis in official sources like COMELEC, it is spelled as Ozamiz in Republic Act No. 321, also known as the Ozamiz City Charter Act. In 2005, City Resolution 251-05 was passed to reiterate that it is officially spelled Ozamiz, not Ozamis.

== History ==
=== Colonial period ===
==== Spanish period ====
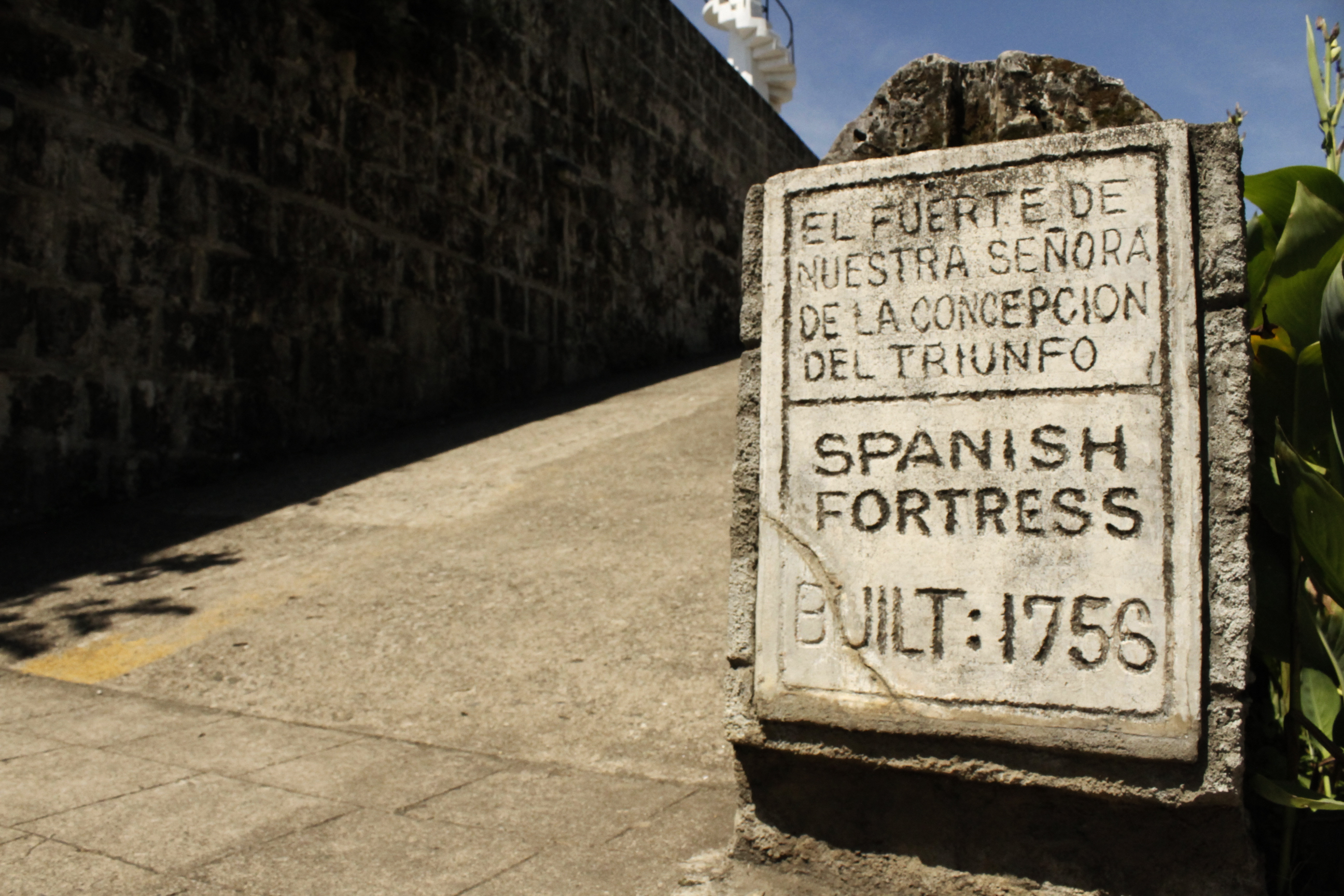
Fuerte de la Concepcion y del Triunfo marker

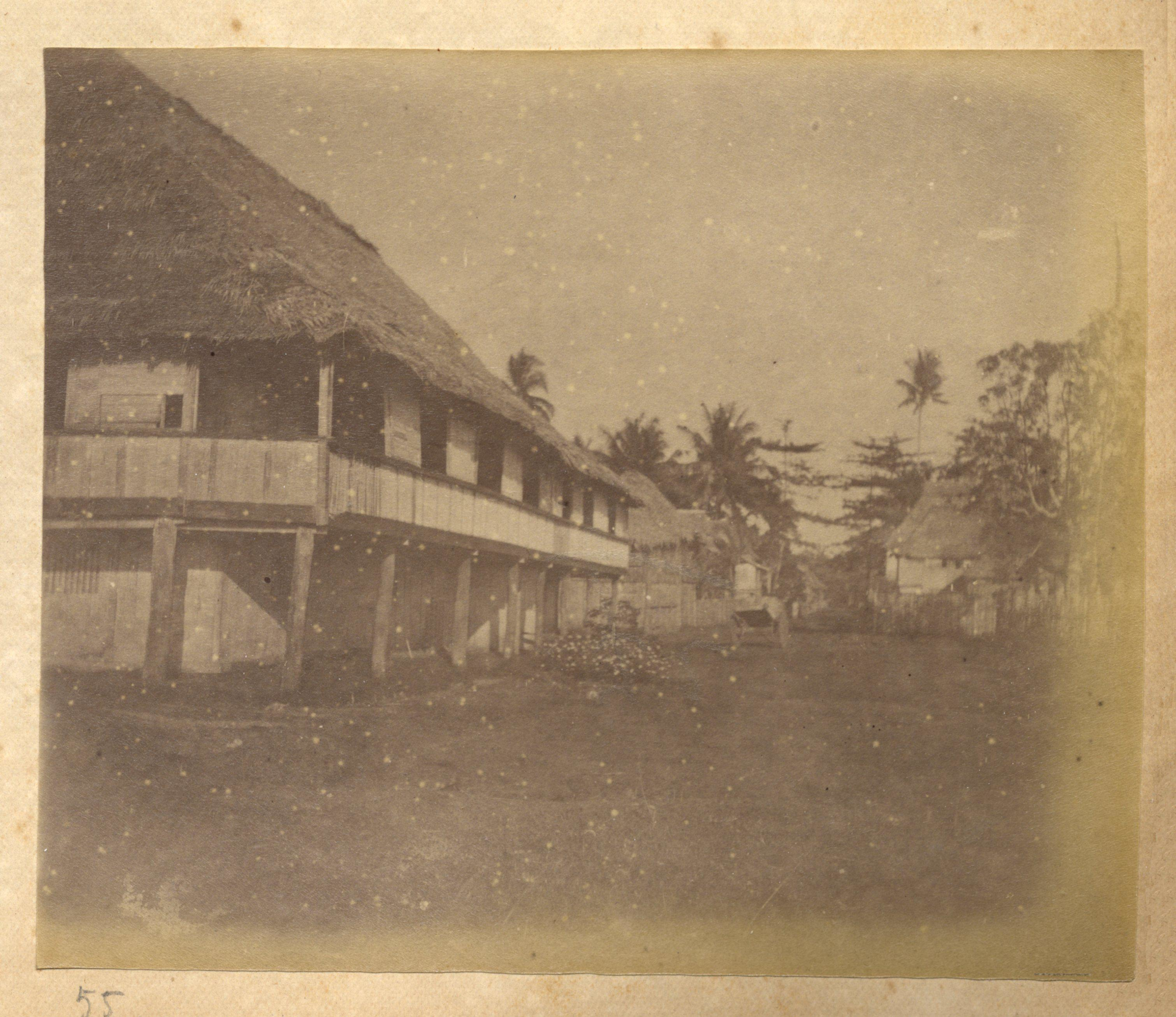
Town of Misamis, late 1800s

The city of Ozamiz grew out of an old Spanish town called Misamis—a name believed to have been derived from the Subanon word kuyamis, a variety of coconut that was a staple food of the Subanon people. Other unverified historical sources, however, suggest that the name Misamis came from the Spanish word Misa (Catholic Mass).

Misamis was originally settled by the Subanon people, and were heavily targeted by marauding pirates coming from Lanao. The Spanish government created a flotilla to counter the pirates, with Spanish Jesuit missionary José Ducos assigned as its commander. After several victories, the Fuerte de la Concepcion y del Triunfo was constructed at the mouth of Panguil Bay sometime in 1756 as a form of protection from future attacks.

The town of Misamis grew in size due to the presence of the stone fort. In 1850, the town of Misamis became the capital of the District of Misamis, when Mindanao was originally divided into five districts, until February 27, 1872, when the Spanish Governor General Carlos María de la Torre y Navacerrada issued a decree declaring Cagayan de Misamis the permanent capital.

==== American period and World War II ====
During the American occupation, the territory of Misamis was reduced. In 1920, Governor-General Francis Burton Harrison issued Executive Order (EO) No. 61; the barrios, which were once part of the former municipality of Loculan, were separated and organized into the new municipalities of Clarin and Tudela.

In 1929, Governor-General Dwight F. Davis issued EO No. 220 that organized the municipality of Regidor (now Tangub; also included the present-day territory of Bonifacio), which took effect in 1930 as the province of Occidental Misamis was established following the split of Misamis.

In October 1942, Wendell Fertig established the command headquarters of the growing guerrilla resistance to the Japanese occupation of Mindanao in the Spanish fort in the town. His headquarters was abandoned on June 26, 1943 due to a large Japanese attack. During the Japanese occupation of Misamis in World War II, the fort was garrisoned by a Japanese contingent until the end of the war, who dug foxholes near or under the walls. This undermining of the walls later led to the destruction of the southwest bastion in the 1955 Lanao earthquake.

=== Contemporary period ===
After the war, Misamis became a chartered city by virtue of Republic Act 321 on July 16, 1948. This also renamed Misamis to Ozamiz, after the hero José Ozámiz who hailed from the province of Misamis Occidental and who at one time also served as its first governor, congressional representative of the Lone District of Misamis Occidental, and a delegate to the 1935 Constitutional Convention that resulted in the creation of the 1935 Constitution for the Philippine Commonwealth Government. José Ozámiz was also elected to the Philippine Senate in 1941. This made Ozamiz the 4th city in Mindanao, after Zamboanga, Davao, and Marawi.

On April 1, 1955, Ozamiz was struck by the 1955 Lanao earthquake, at 2:17 am. The 7.4-magnitude earthquake caused the destruction of the city's parish church and the southwest bastion of the Fuerte de la Concepcion y del Triunfo. Major cracks were also present in the city's roads. President Ramon Magsaysay declared a state of calamity in Ozamiz, as well as in the provinces of Misamis Occidental, Misamis Oriental, Lanao, and Surigao.

On February 25, 2000, three Super Five Transport buses aboard the M/V Our Lady of Mediatrix ferry exploded while the ferry was traveling from Kolambugan, Lanao del Norte to the Port of Ozamiz. The reason for the explosion was the use of large incendiary bombs, resulting in 44 deaths and more than 100 passengers wounded.

On July 30, 2017, the Criminal Investigation and Detection Group and the Ozamiz City Police raided the house of incumbent Mayor Reynaldo Parojinog Sr. where guns were allegedly stored, resulting in the deaths of 16 people, including Mayor Parojinog, his wife Susan, and two of his siblings. The raid also ended with the mayor's children, incumbent Vice Mayor Nova Princess Parojinog-Echavez and Reynaldo Parojinog Jr., being arrested. This incident was part of the war on drugs campaign during President Rodrigo Duterte's administration.

== Geography ==
Ozamiz is located on the southeast coast of Misamis Occidental. It is nearby the Zamboanga del Sur and Zamboanga del Norte provinces to the west, and Lanao del Norte is across the Panguil Bay.

It is bordered by Tangub to the south and Clarin to the north. Ozamiz is 52 kilometers (32 mi) from Maria Cristina Falls, the main source of hydroelectric power in Mindanao.

Ozamiz is located on a narrow portion of the Panguil Bay, providing marine resources as well as access to ferry and container ship transportation. The eastern portion of Ozamiz, including the city proper, lies on flat land, with parts of it being agricultural land. To the west, the flat terrain gives rise to rolling hills, being the foot of Mount Malindang. Near the city proper is Bukagan Hill, which is distinguishable across the mostly flat terrain of the downtown area and is visible across the bay.

=== Climate ===
Climate data for Ozamiz City, Misamis Occidental
Month	Jan	Feb	Mar	Apr	May	Jun	Jul	Aug	Sep	Oct	Nov	Dec	Year
Mean daily maximum °C (°F)	29 (84)	30 (86)	31 (88)	31 (88)	30 (86)	30 (86)	29 (84)	30 (86)	30 (86)	30 (86)	30 (86)	30 (86)	30 (86)
Mean daily minimum °C (°F)	22 (72)	22 (72)	22 (72)	23 (73)	24 (75)	24 (75)	24 (75)	24 (75)	24 (75)	24 (75)	23 (73)	23 (73)	23 (74)
Average precipitation mm (inches)	69 (2.7)	58 (2.3)	67 (2.6)	60 (2.4)	109 (4.3)	114 (4.5)	83 (3.3)	78 (3.1)	76 (3.0)	92 (3.6)	86 (3.4)	63 (2.5)	955 (37.7)
Average rainy days	12.8	11.6	14.8	17.4	24.8	23.5	20.7	18.5	17.4	22.5	21.6	15.6	221.2
Source: Meteoblue (modeled/calculated data, not measured locally)

== Economy ==
Poverty incidence of Ozamiz (%)

Source: Philippine Statistics Authority

Ozamiz is agricultural in terms of natural resources, but the city has become the center for commerce, health, transportation, and education, considering its strategic location. Its location makes for a good harbor, as its local port is the principal outlet of mineral deposits and agricultural and forest products of the provinces of Misamis Occidental, Zamboanga del Norte, Zamboanga del Sur, Maguindanao del Norte, Maguindanao del Sur, parts of Lanao del Norte, and Lanao del Sur.

== Demographics ==
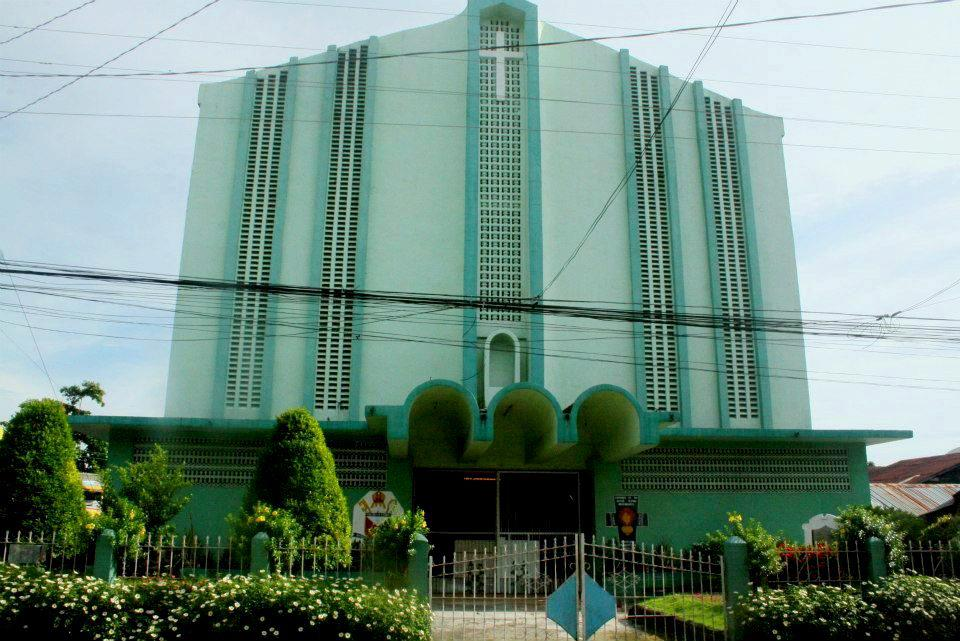
The Cathedral of St. Mary of the Philippine Independent Church (Iglesia Filipina Independiente or Aglipayan Church)

Population census of Ozamiz

Year	Pop.	±% p.a.
1903	11,709	—
1918	23,237	+4.68%
1939	36,313	+2.15%
1948	35,262	−0.33%
1960	44,091	+1.88%
1970	64,643	+3.90%

Year	Pop.	±% p.a.
1975	71,559	+2.06%
1980	77,832	+1.69%
1990	91,503	+1.63%
1995	101,944	+2.05%
2000	110,420	+1.73%
2007	123,137	+1.51%

Year	Pop.	±% p.a.
2010	131,527	+2.43%
2015	141,828	+1.45%
2020	140,334	−0.22%
2024	143,620	+0.56%

Source: Philippine Statistics Authority

In the 2024 census, Ozamiz had a population of 143,620 people, with a density of 850 inhabitants per square kilometer or 2,200 inhabitants per square mile.

== Government ==
Ozamiz City Hall

Local officials are elected every three years. The city local government is composed of the mayor, vice mayor, ten councilors, one Sangguniang Kabataan (SK) representative, one indigenous people (IPMR) representative, and an Association of Barangay Captains (ABC) representative.

As of 2025, these are the current elected officials:

- Mayor: Atty. Sam Norman G. Fuentes (Asenso Pinoy)
- Vice Mayor: Simplicia “Bebie” O. Neri (Asenso Pinoy)
- Congressman: Sancho Fernando “Ando” F. Oaminal (Lakas)
- Councilors:
  - Lorlie Fuentes-Cipres (Asenso Pinoy)
  - Katherine “Kat-Kat” C. Lim (Asenso Pinoy)
  - Cecille Y. Co (Asenso Pinoy)
  - Marcelo Archie S. Romero II (Asenso Pinoy)
  - Roland “Dinky” B. Suizo Jr. (Asenso Pinoy)
  - Atty. Daniel C. Lao (Asenso Pinoy)
  - Juanito “Junjun” B. Saquin Jr. (Asenso Pinoy)
  - Atty. Marcelian “Mars” C. Tapayan (Asenso Pinoy)
  - Sancho “Sunny” S. Oaminal (Asenso Pinoy)
  - Saulo B. Salvador (Asenso Pinoy)
  - John Fel D. Duhaylungsod (SK Federation President)
  - Jun Carlo Murallon (ABC President)
  - Relinda A. Bation (IPMR)

=== Barangays ===
Ozamiz is politically subdivided into 51 barangays. Each barangay consists of puroks while some have sitios.

Name	Population (2024)	PSGC
50th District (Poblacion)	581	104210051
Aguada (Poblacion)	7,113	104210001
Bacolod	1,783	104210003
Bagakay	5,110	104210004
Balintawak	684	104210005
Bañadero	7,692	104210002
Baybay San Roque	3,398	104210043
Baybay Santa Cruz	1,589	104210006
Baybay Triunfo	2,520	104210007
Bongbong	3,097	104210008
Calabayan	4,029	104210009
Capucao C.	649	104210010
Capucao P.	1,183	104210011
Carangan	5,160	104210012
Carmen	6,135	104210037
Catadman-Manabay	5,887	104210013
Cavinte	686	104210014
Cogon	1,733	104210015
Dalapang	770	104210016
Digu-an	1,530	104210017
Dimaluna	3,242	104210018
Doña Consuelo	4,371	104210052
Embargo	1,079	104210019
Gala	959	104210020
Gango	6,648	104210021
Gotokan Daku	508	104210022
Gotokan Diot	610	104210023
Guimad	615	104210024
Guingona	586	104210025
Kinuman Norte	1,705	104210026
Kinuman Sur	1,332	104210027
Labinay	1,211	104210028
Labo	4,023	104210029
Lam-an	2,620	104210030
Liposong	1,207	104210031
Litapan	1,012	104210032
Malaubang	9,421	104210033
Manaka	817	104210034
Maningcol	7,027	104210035
Mentering	377	104210036
Molicay	4,149	104210038
Pantaon	1,215	104210040
Pulot	4,116	104210041
San Antonio	4,392	104210042
Sangay Daku	909	104210044
Sangay Diot	529	104210045
Sinuza	1,373	104210046
Stimson Abordo (Montol)	2,315	104210039
Tabid	4,208	104210047
Tinago	9,662	104210048
Trigos	893	104210049

== Culture ==
=== Notable events and festivals ===
The city celebrates the Sinulog Festival, dedicated to the Santo Niño de Cebu, every 4th Sunday of January, wherein a pilgrim image of the Santo Niño will arrive from Cebu City and will visit Ozamiz and other cities and towns in the province for a week.

Ozamiz's Charter Day anniversary, the feast of Nuestra Señora de la Inmaculada Concepcion y del Triunfo de la Cruz de Migpangi, and the Perangat Ozamiz Festival (formerly known as the Subayan Keg Subanen Festival) are celebrated on July 16. The Perangat Festival is a celebration dedicated to the Subanon people, the original inhabitants of the province. The festival includes day-long street dancing, as well as a ritual showdown that features the various rituals practiced by the Subanon people, such as weddings and healing rituals. "Perangat" means "to prosper" in the Subanen language.

On December 8, the Feast of Our Lady of the Immaculate Conception is celebrated. Firework displays are held at the City Hall.

== Tourism ==
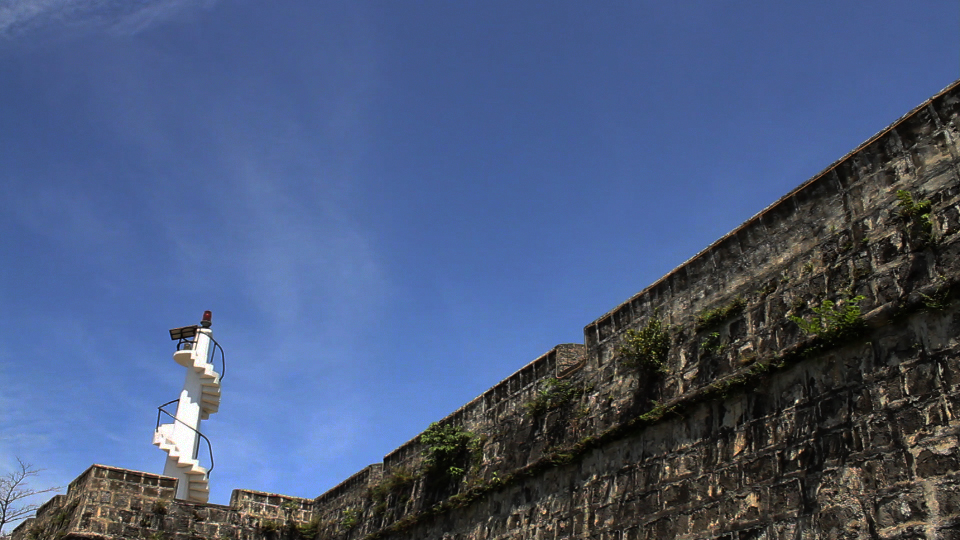
Fuerte de la Concepcion y del Triunfo

Metropolitan Cathedral of the Immaculate Conception

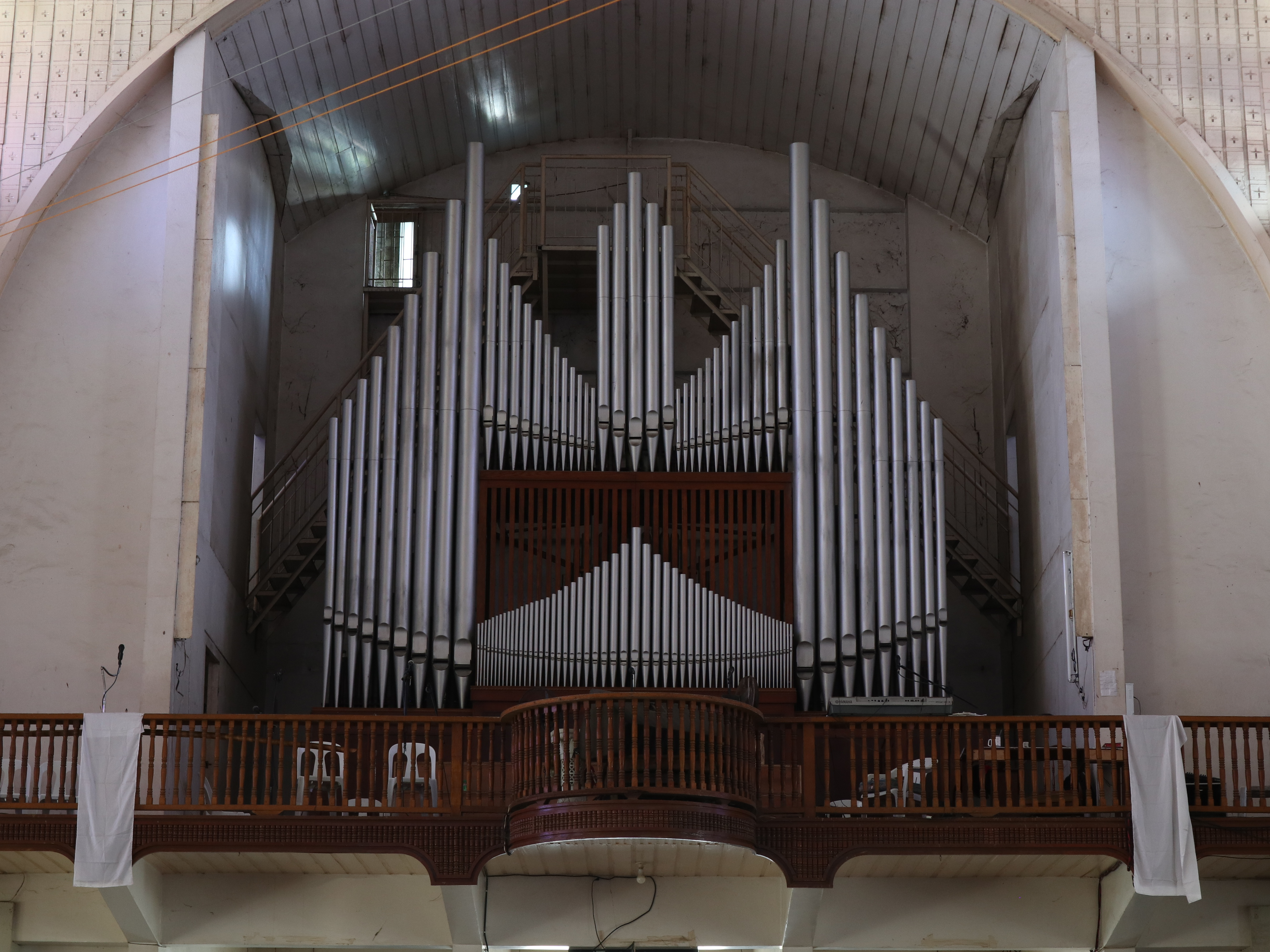
Immaculate Conception pipe organ

Fuerte de la Concepcion y del Triunfo, locally known as the "Cotta," is a fort built in 1756 by Father José Ducos to serve as a Spanish outpost in the area. On the outside wall of the fort is an outdoor shrine dedicated to the Nuestra Señora de la Immaculada Concepción y del Triunfo de la Cruz de Migpangi, locally known as the Birhen sa Cotta (lit. 'Virgin of the Fort'). The bas relief of the Virgin is believed to be miraculous and is a pilgrimage destination. In 2002, the fort was renovated and restored to its original design.

The Metropolitan Cathedral of the Immaculate Conception was built from the ruins of the parish church destroyed in the 1955 earthquake. The cathedral is one of the earliest designs of National Artist for Architecture Leandro Locsin. His simple style of squares, circles, and half circles are evident throughout the external and internal designs of the church. Alterations to the façade of the cathedral were performed later. The cathedral is home to the wooden image of the Birhen sa Cotta.

The Immaculate Conception Pipe Organ, found in the choir loft of the Metropolitan Cathedral of the Immaculate Conception, is the only existing pipe organ in Mindanao, and one of only a few anywhere in the Philippines. It was Father Sean Lavery, an Irish-Columbian priest in charge of music at the cathedral, who first thought of the idea of an organ at Immaculate Conception. Funds were raised through donations and a musical extravaganza, organized by the parish, to buy the pipe organ. Father Lavery requested the aid of a German priest, Father Herman Schablitzki S.V.D., in designing the organ. Father Schatblitzki visited Ozamiz to take measurements to give to the organ builders back in Germany. Father Schablitzki himself, assisted by one carpenter and one electrician, assembled the organ in six weeks, and it was completed on May 31, 1967. It was inaugurated on July 16, 1967, the feast day of Our Lady of Mount Carmel and the Birhen sa Cotta.

Bukagan Hill is located in Barangay Malaubang. There are four great bells at the top of Bukagan Hill, named "St. Peter", "St. Marien", "St. Joseph", and "St. Michael". They were originally purchased by Bishop-Prelate Patrick Cronin, D.D. for the Metropolitan Cathedral of the Immaculate Conception. However, the bells weigh 7 tons and were found to be too heavy and too large for the cathedral's belfry. Given the recent costs of installing an organ at the cathedral, it was commonly thought that the installation of the bells would prove too expensive but, through the efforts of then Mayor Fernando T. Bernad and Jesus Y. Varela, the bells were finally given a place at Bukagan Hill.

Timfanel Garden Ornamental Plant Farm, formerly known as Naomi's Botanical Garden and Tourist's Inn, sits on a 12-hectare property. The garden features a variety local and imported tropical flowers, plants, and fruit trees. The hotel has fully air-conditioned private rooms, and is home to a variety of amenities, including function halls, a tennis court, a ceramics shop, and swimming pools.

Mt. Malindang Golf and Country Club is a pre-war army facility converted into a golf course located in Barangay Bagakay, at the foot of Mount Malindang.

== Transportation ==
=== Air ===
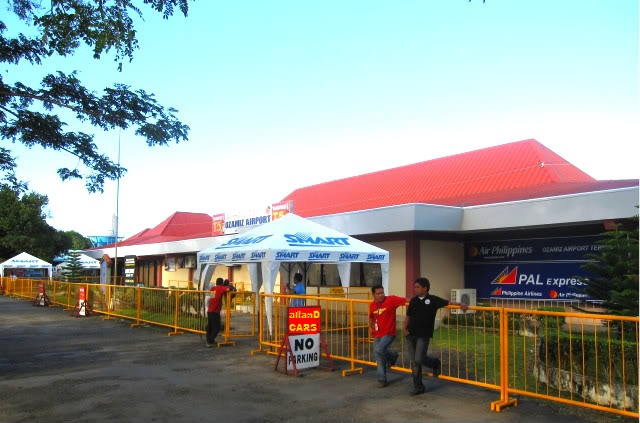
Ozamiz Airport

Ozamiz Airport, also known as Labo Airport, was reopened on July 5, 2007, 9 years after Philippine Airlines (PAL) stopped their original Fokker 50 and Sunriser plane operation at the airport. The inability of the airport to accommodate jet planes due to its short runway led to its closure. Air Philippines (a subsidiary airline of PAL) was the first airline that used Ninoy Aquino International Airport in Manila, using a Boeing 737-200, the first jet plane to land at the airport. PAL Express, another PAL subsidiary, then made direct flights to Mactan–Cebu International Airport again using their Bombardier Q400.

PAL's competitor, Cebu Pacific Air, later started serving Ozamiz with their first flight to Cebu on November 10, 2008, using their brand-new ATR72-500. Due to high passenger and cargo demand, Cebu Pacific launched its Manila route with their Airbus A319, while PAL took over Air Philippine's service to Manila using their Airbus A319s on June 16, 2009.

When Air Philippines rebranded as Airphil Express (now PAL Express), it relaunched its Ozamiz to Manila service on August 18, 2011, using their Airbus A320. It then forced Cebu Pacific to change its aircraft that had previously served Ozamiz Airport, replacing all of their ATR72-500s with Airbus A319s and Airbus A320s. Despite fierce competition between PAL and Cebu Pacific, PAL ended their operations in Ozamiz on March 25, 2012, leaving their affiliate PAL Express to compete with Cebu Pacific. Since then, the competition between PAL Express and Cebu Pacific became a duopoly serving the airport.

Ozamiz Airport will undergo a P300 million expansion and development project. The project will consist of the installation of runway lights, the extension of runway from its current of length 1.9 km to 2.1 km, and the construction of a new passenger terminal building.

=== Sea ===
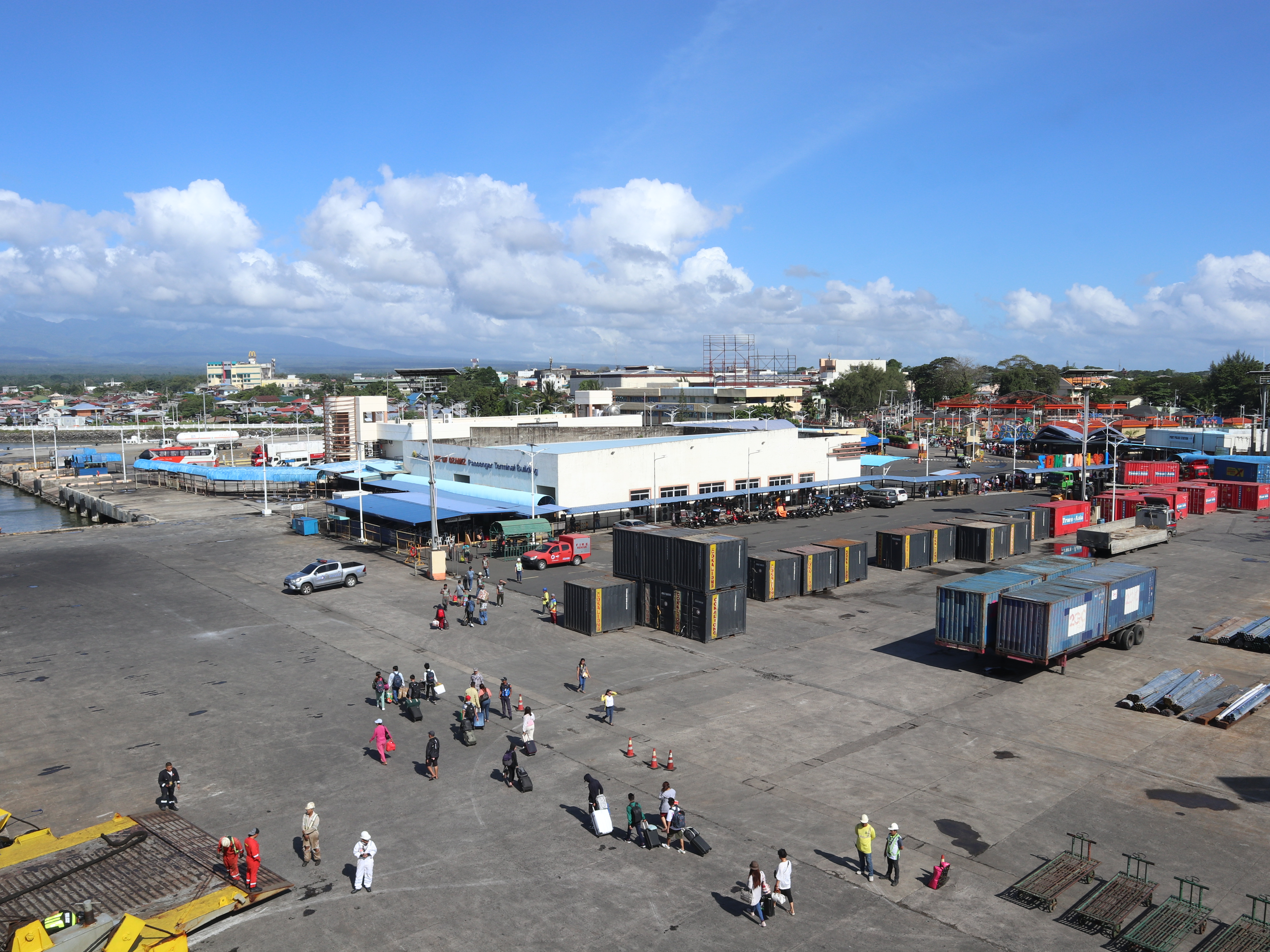
Port of Ozamiz

The Port of Ozamiz serves the city with routes connecting Ozamiz to Cebu City, Manila, and Iligan.

Local shipping lines like Daima have trips from Ozamiz to Mukas, Kolambugan, Lanao del Norte routes through roll-on/roll-off (RORO) ferries that transport passengers, vehicles, and goods across Panguil Bay. However, following the opening of the Panguil Bay Bridge in 2024, ferry operations have been greatly reduced, with limited or occasional trips remaining primarily for cargo and vehicle transport as most travelers now use the bridge.

=== Land ===
Most transportation within the city is done by trisikad/pedicab and motorized tricycle. For interprovincial transportation, Rural Transit, Super Five, and UV Express are predominantly used.

== Healthcare ==
Ozamiz City currently has seven hospitals and healthcare facilities:

- Mayor Hilarion A. Ramiro Sr. Medical Center (MHARS MC): a 1000-bed capacity tertiary hospital owned by the Department of Health
- Misamis University Medical Center (MUMC): a tertiary hospital located at Barangay Bagakay
- Medina General Hospital: a 200-bed capacity tertiary hospital located at Barangay Carmen
- Tobias-Feliciano Faith General Hospital, Inc.
- S.M. Lao Memorial City General Hospital
- St. Joseph General Hospital, formerly St. Mary General Hospital
- St. Padre Pio Medical Clinic: located at JEM bldg., Medina Avenue, Barangay Carmen

== Education ==
There are two universities in Ozamiz: La Salle University and Misamis University. A significant number of students coming from Lanao del Norte, Zamboanga del Sur, Zamboanga del Norte, and Misamis Occidental come to Ozamiz to pursue their college education. Additional schools and institutions include:

- Immaculate Conception School of Technology of Ozamiz City (ICST)
- La Salle University
- Lighthouse Christian Academy
- Lyceum Professional Institute
- Medina College
- Misamis Institute of Technology
- Misamis University
- Northwestern Mindanao School of Technology (NMST)
- Our Lady of Triumph Institute of Technology (OLT)
- Ozamiz City Institute of Technology
- Vocational Institute of the Philippines and Maritime Training Center

=== Secondary schools ===
The secondary schools of Ozamiz are:

- Capucao Integrated School
- Cogon Integrated School
- Diego Tuastomban Integrated School
- Domingo A. Barloa Integrated School
- FMC MA School and Tutorial Services, Inc.
- Gala National High School
- Guingona Integrated School
- HBLL College, Inc.
- Jacinto Nemeño Integrated School
- Jose Lim Ho National High School
- Labinay National High School
- Labo National High School
- Malaubang Integrated School
- Marcelino C. Regis Integrated School
- Misamis Annex Integrated School
- Misamis Union Educational Foundation, Inc.
- Montol National High School
- Ozamis Cathedral School of Immaculate Conception Inc.
- Ozamiz City National High School
- Ozamiz City School of Arts and Trades (OCSAT)
- Pulot National High School
- San Antonio National High School
- Sancho V. Capa Integrated School
- Sangay Integrated School
- Sinusa Integrated School
- Tabid National High School
- Western Mindanao Adventist Academy - Ozamiz City

== Sister cities ==
=== Domestic ===
- Tangub
- Oroquieta
- Iligan
- Cotabato City
- Dipolog
- General Santos
- Cebu City
- Iloilo City
- Pagadian
- Marawi
- Cagayan de Oro
- Laoag
- San Juan City

=== International ===
- (United States) Jersey City, New Jersey (1995)

== Notable people ==
- Earl Agustin - singer-songwriter
- Cherry Lou - actress
- Sofronio Vasquez - singer

== See also ==
- List of renamed cities and municipalities in the Philippines
- Labo Airport
