= Mayor Hilarion A. Ramiro Sr. Medical Center =

Government hospital in Misamis Occidental, Philippines

- Department of Health

Geography
- Location: Mindog, Maningcol, Ozamiz, Misamis Occidental, Philippines
- Coordinates: 8°10′11″N 123°51′30″E

Services
- Beds: 1,000

History
- Former names: Ozamiz City National Emergency Hospital; Mayor Hilarion A. Ramiro, Sr. General Hospital; Mayor Hilarion A. Ramiro, Sr. Regional Training and Teaching Hospital

Links
- Website: mharsmc.doh.gov.ph

The Mayor Hilarion A. Ramiro Sr. Medical Center (MHARS-MC) is a 1000-bed capacity tertiary government hospital in Ozamiz, Misamis Occidental, Philippines. It is managed under the Department of Health.

Initially named as Ozamiz City National Emergency Hospital, it was renamed in honor of Hilarion A. Ramiro Sr., a physician by profession and the mayor of Ozamiz City at the time the hospital was established. His son, Hilarion Jr., who was also a doctor, became the first chief of the hospital. Later, Hilarion Jr. became the regional health director of Region XI, congressman of the Second District of Misamis Occidental, and secretary of health.

== History ==
On June 19, 1965, Republic Act No. 4225 was passed into law, providing the establishment of Ozamiz City National Emergency Hospital. Dr. Hilarion J. Hilarion Ramiro Jr., the son of then Ozamiz City Mayor Hilarion A. Ramiro Sr., was the chief of hospital. Batas Pambansa Blg. 777 enacted on April 13, 1984, changed its name to Mayor Hilarion A. Ramiro Sr. General Hospital (MHARS GEN). Its 100 bed capacity was increased to 150 on February 25, 1992, by the virtue of Republic Act. No. 7197. The hospital was converted into a regional training and teaching hospital on March 1, 1995, by virtue of Republic Act No. 7937 and became known as Mayor Hilarion A. Ramiro Sr. Regional Training and Teaching Hospital (MHARS RTTH). Republic Act No. 10865, approved on June 23, 2016, upgraded the status of MHARS RTTH by converting the regional training and teaching hospital to a medical center, increased its bed capacity from 150 to 500, and changed its name to Mayor Hilarion A. Ramiro Sr. Medical Center (MHARS MC). On June 24, 2021,the bed capacity of MHARS MC increased from 500 to 1,000, by Republic Act No. 11563.
