= Medina College-Ozamiz =

Private college in Misamis Occidental, Philippines

Medina College - Ozamiz City
- Dalubhasaang Medina - Ozamiz (Filipino)
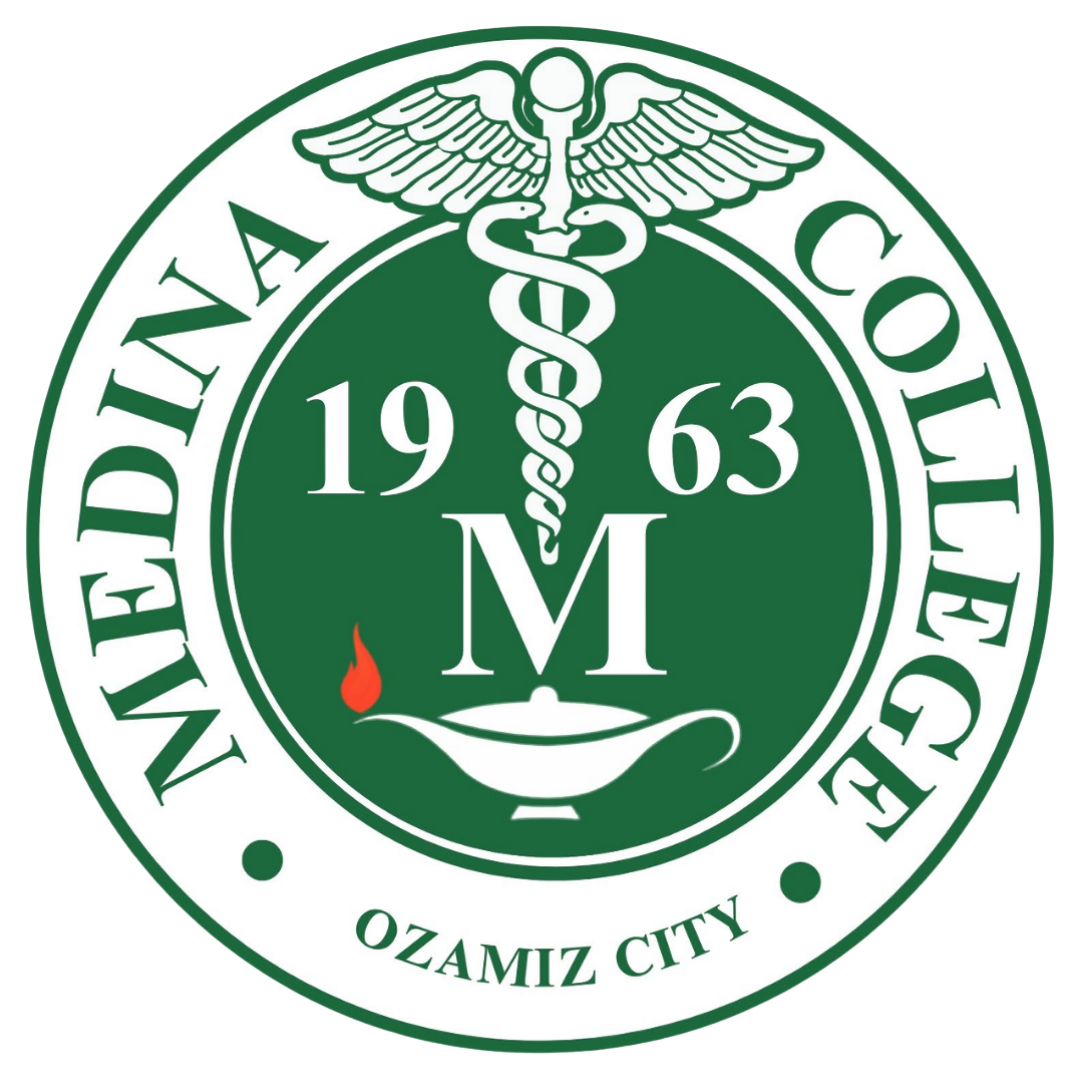
- Former name: Medina School of Midwifery
- Motto: The New and Bright Horizon in Modern Education
- Type: Private, non-sectarian higher education institution
- Established: June 1963; 63 years ago
- Founders: Dr. Rico Macan Medina, Sr. Dr. Beatriz Crisostomo Medina
- Chairman: Rico M. Medina, Sr., M.D.
- President: Rico C. Medina Jr., MA, Ed.D.
- Location: Brgy. Maningcol, Ozamiz City, Misamis Occidental, Philippines; 8°09′59″N 123°51′34″E
- Colors: Green and White
- Website: www.medinacollege.com
- Location in Mindanao Location in the Philippines

Medina College - Ozamiz City, formerly Medina School of Midwifery, is a private, non-sectarian college in Ozamiz City, Philippines under Medina College Inc., which is deemed to be the first private midwifery school in Ozamiz. Much like its sister colleges in Pagadian and Ipil, which were founded some years later, the school is mainly concentrated in accommodating nursing students. Other academic programs, including engineering, criminology, arts and sciences, management and accountancy, are also offered.

The college is directed at Filipino families who find it hard to break through financial barriers and send off their children for tertiary education.

== History ==
Medina College-Ozamiz was founded in June 1963 by Dr. Rico Macan Medina Sr. and his wife, Dr. Beatriz Crisostomo Medina, which back then was named the Medina School of Midwifery, the first private Midwifery School in Ozamiz City. Also the establishment of the Medina General Hospital, currently a Tertiary Level Hospital with a 200 bed-capacity at Jose Abad Santos St., New Annex, Ozamiz City. It took some years before the name Medina School of Midwifery was changed to Medina College.
