= Misamis Institute of Technology =

Private school in Misamis Occidental, Philippines

Coordinates: 8°08′54″N 123°49′25″E

Misamis Institute of Technology is a private, non-sectarian, co-educational institution of higher learning in Ozamiz City, Misamis Occidental, Philippines. It offers maritime courses such as Bs Marine Transportation (Nautical), Bs Marine Engineering; BS in Office Administration; BS in Computer Science; BA in Communication.

The Misamis Institute of Technology is headed by Engineer Galileo Abadies Maglasang in Ozamiz City and recognized by CHED and MARINA Philippines.
