= Pabama Transport =

Bus company in the Philippines

Pabama Tours and Transport
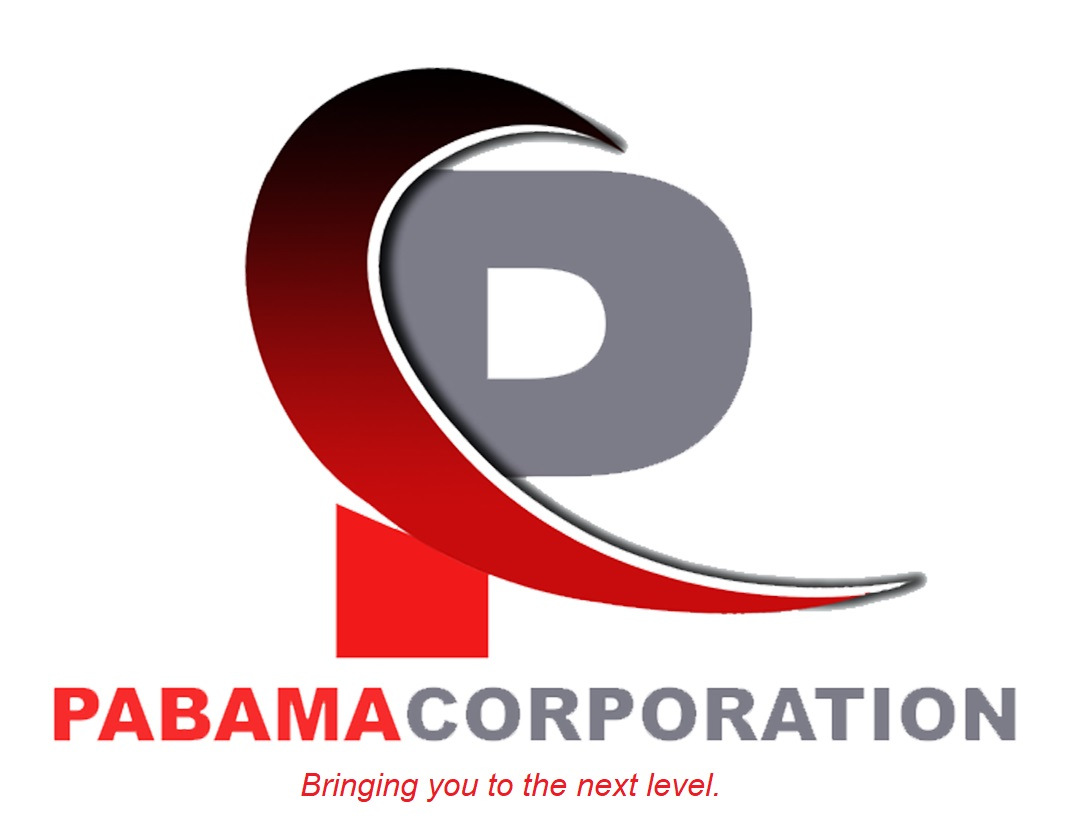

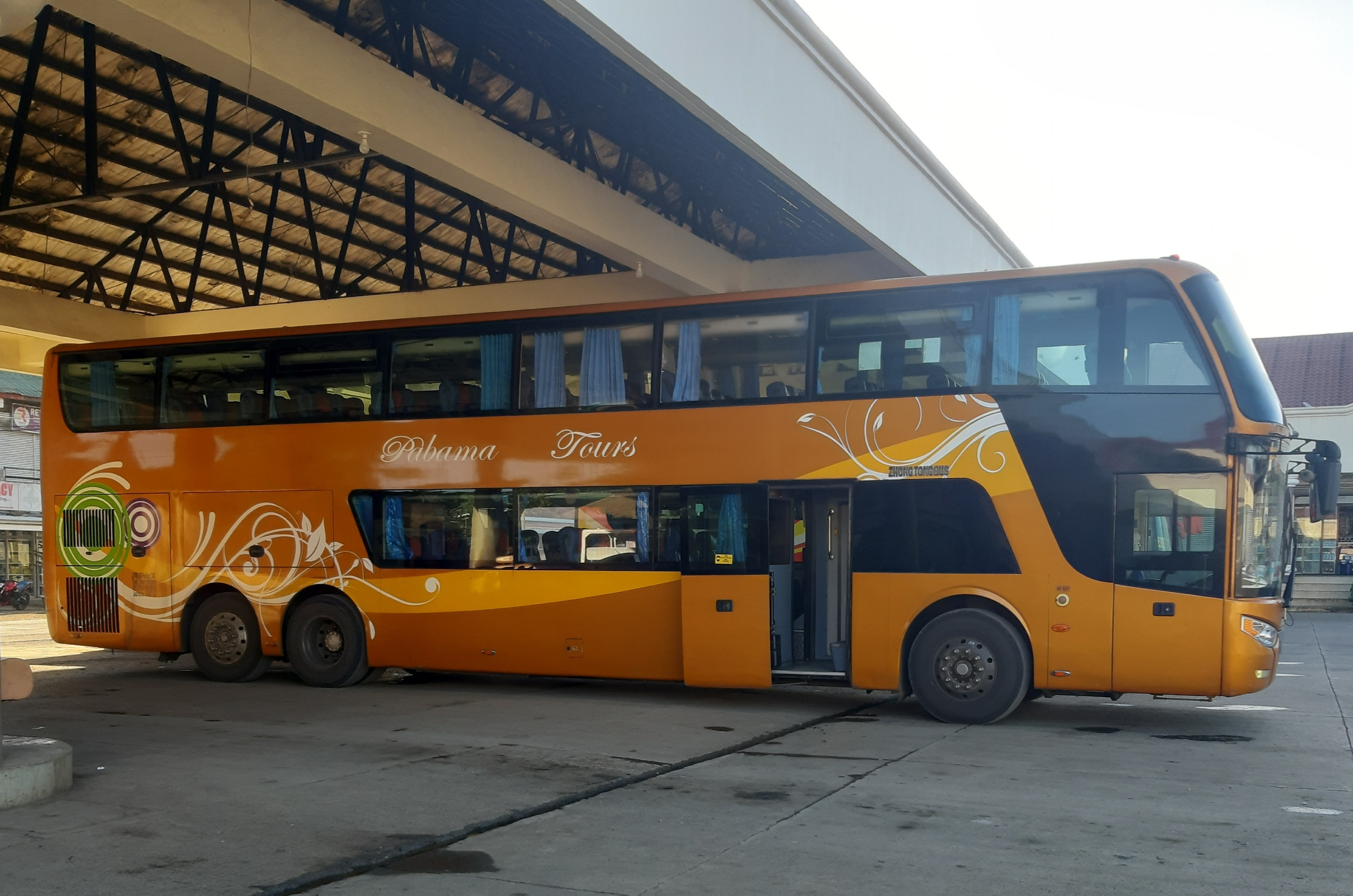
- Double-decker bus of Pabama Tours in Kibawe, Bukidnon province
- Founded: 1998
- Headquarters: Kibawe, Bukidnon province, Philippines
- Service area: Northern Mindanao
- Service type: Intercity coach service
- Destinations: Cagayan de Oro; Kibawe; Malaybalay; Valencia; Damulog; Kadingilan; Balingoan; Gingoog
- Fleet: 84 units (Ankai, Yaxing, & Zhongtong)
- Operator: Pabama Corporation
- CEO: Serjohn Panis
- Website: https://pabamacorp.com/

Pabama Corporation, also known as Pabama Tours, Pabama Transport and Pabama Transport and Tours Corporation, is a bus company based in Kibawe town, Bukidnon province in the island of Mindanao in southern Philippines. It serves the routes between the city of Cagayan de Oro, the province of Bukidnon and the city of Gingoog.

A local provincial bus line with humble beginnings, it was the first bus company in the country to introduce the luxury bus with on-board tablets and the double-decker provincial bus.

== History ==
The company was founded in 1998 as Pabama Transport by the Panis family based in Kibawe, Bukidnon. The name of the company was a portmanteau for "Panis Bag Maker" because prior to venturing the transport industry the family are already in the business of making and selling bags in Kibawe and nearby towns operating under such a name. It started out as a local provincial bus line serving the Malaybalay-Kibawe-Kadingilan route using 15 units of used-up and second hand minibuses. Later on they added dilapidated buses and both bought and locally assembled low-grade provincial buses on their fleet. While it continued to be so throughout the whole 2000's decade, during the same time period it often copied the livery of its rival Rural Transit to give the impression that it was a subsidiary of the giant company when in reality it was not, as a marketing strategy and to better secure the preferences and tastes of the commuters.

As Pabama Transport entered the 2010s decade, it began reforming its fleet, procuring several second-hand units acquired from Holiday Bus to augment its fleet. At the same time, the bus line entered the Cagayan de Oro-Kibawe-Damulog route for the first time to expand its service area.

Pabama Transport was incorporated as Pabama Corporation in 2015. That same year, it acquired its first units from Ankai, while also beginning to copy the Rural Transit's practice of naming their airconditioned units into 'Tours', thus Pabama Tours was conceived. That same year, it entered the Cagayan de Oro-Balingoan-Gingoog route as it bought D&C Express the same year and integrated its operations to the company.

In 2017, they became the first bus line in the Philippines to have luxury bus with on-board tablets per seat, which they all bought from Zhongtong Bus Holdings. The next year, they once again became the first bus line in the country to have double-decker buses which they procured from the same bus manufacturer. These acquisitions effectively graduated the company from a small local provincial bus line into a large first-class executive coach service company.

== Fleet ==
Pabama Corporation has a variety of units ranging from small coaster minibuses to standard coaches and double decker buses. All of them have the signage "Immaculate Conception" in front of all their units.

Buses of Pabama Corporation

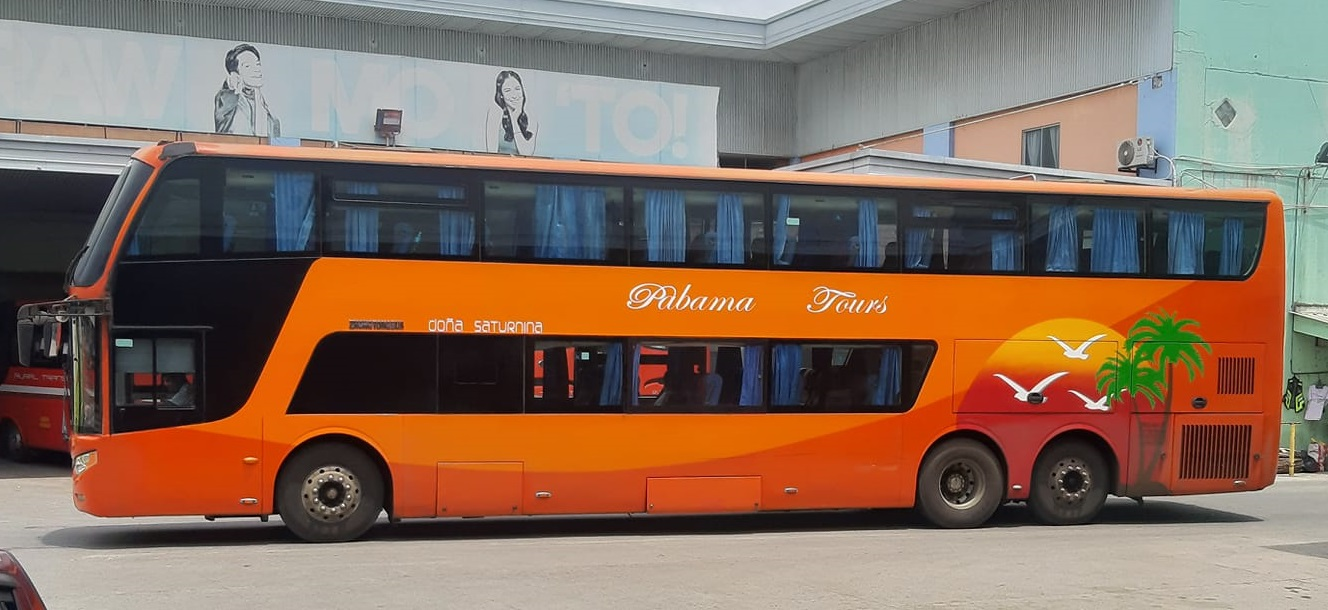
Zhongtong LCK6148HD Navigator double decker bus in Agora Bus Terminal, Cagayan de Oro

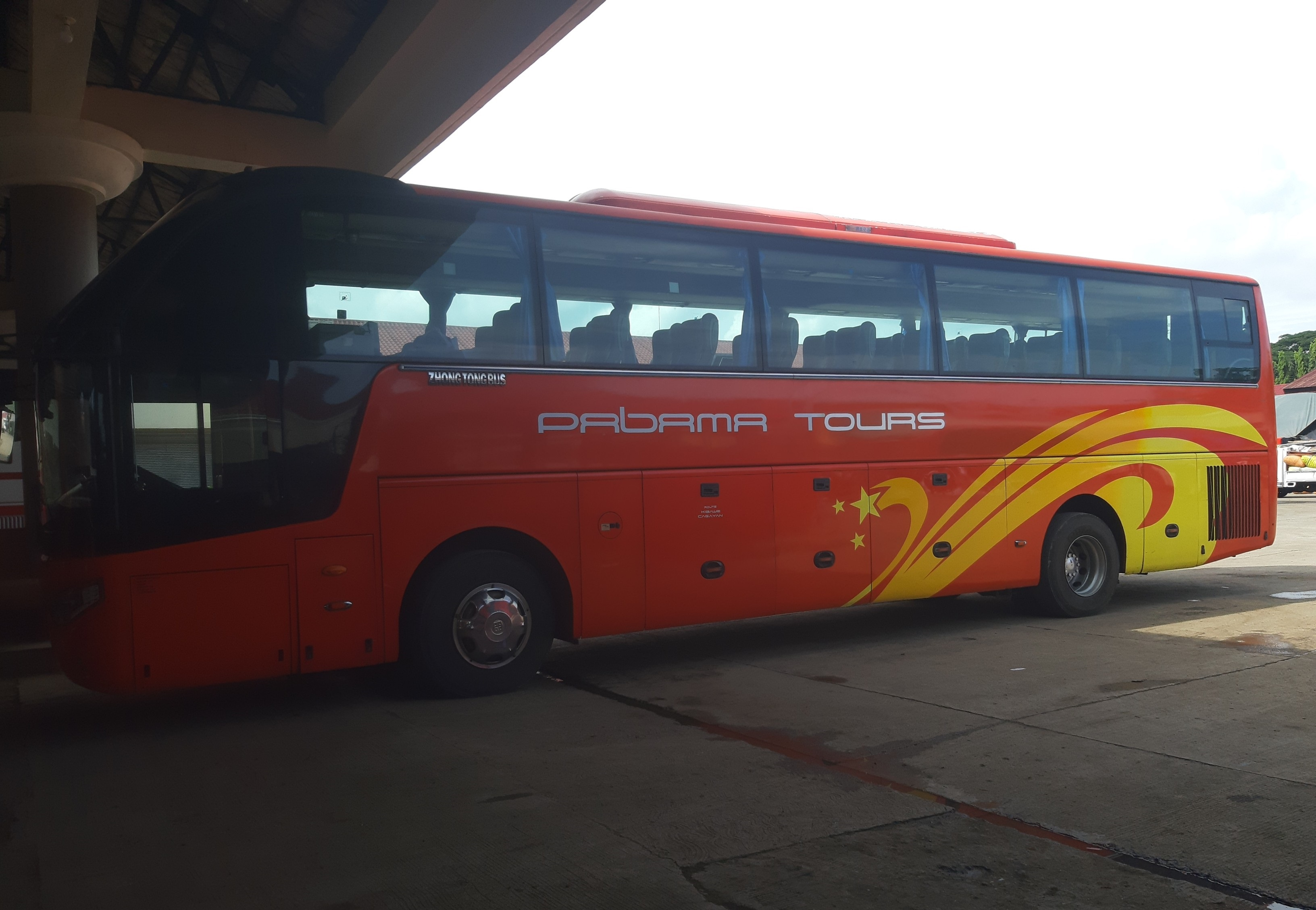
Zhongtong LCK6128H Magnate

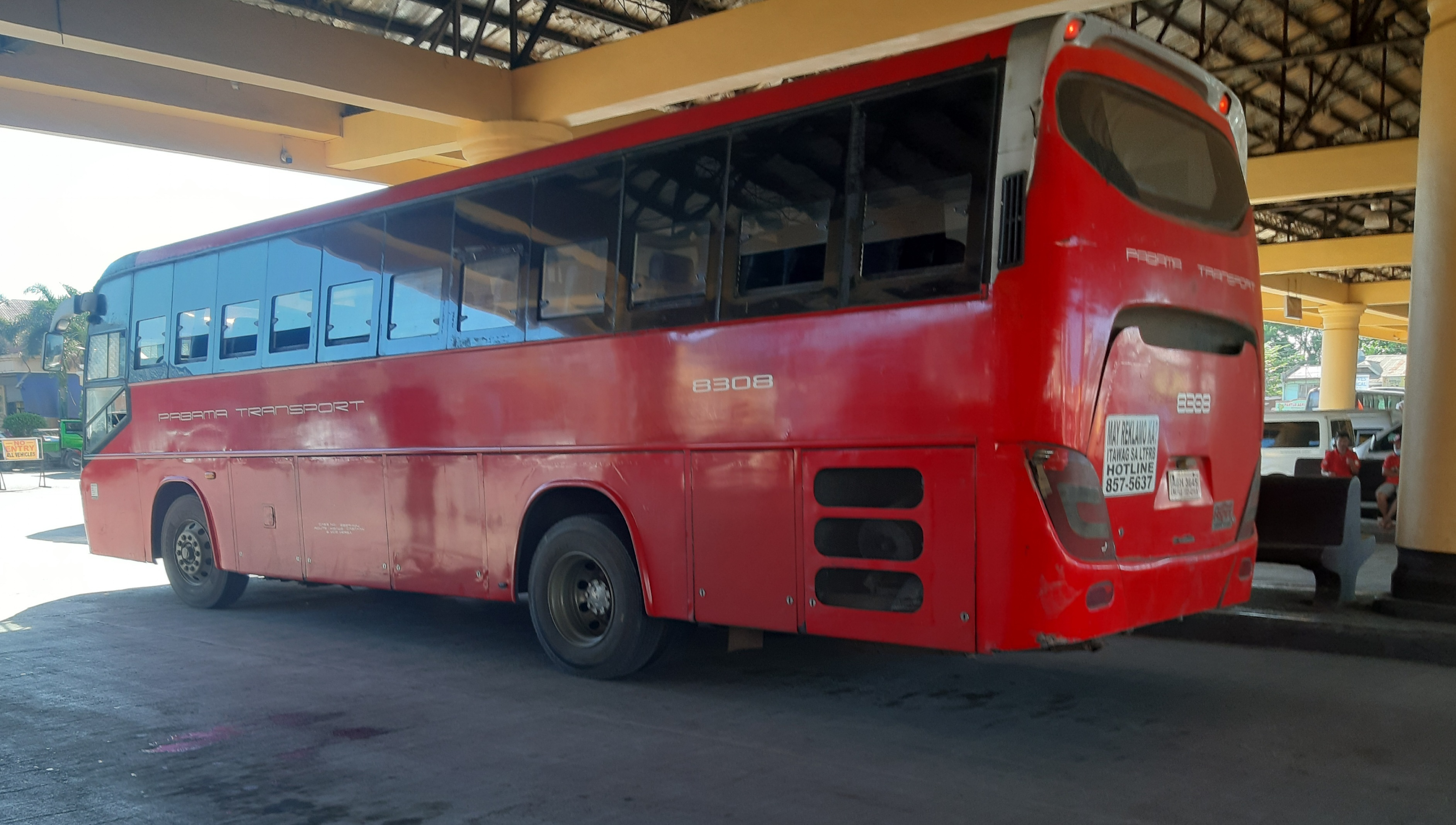
Aspire Daewoo Ankai HFF6108 non-aircon replica

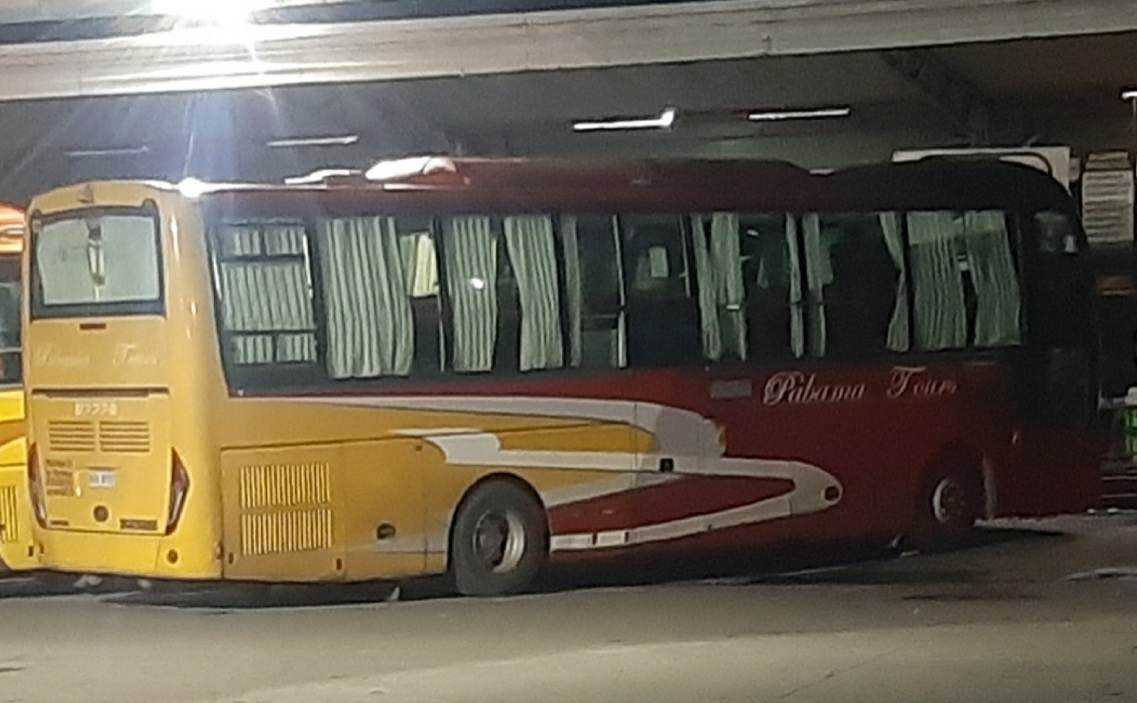
Zhongtong LCK6129HD

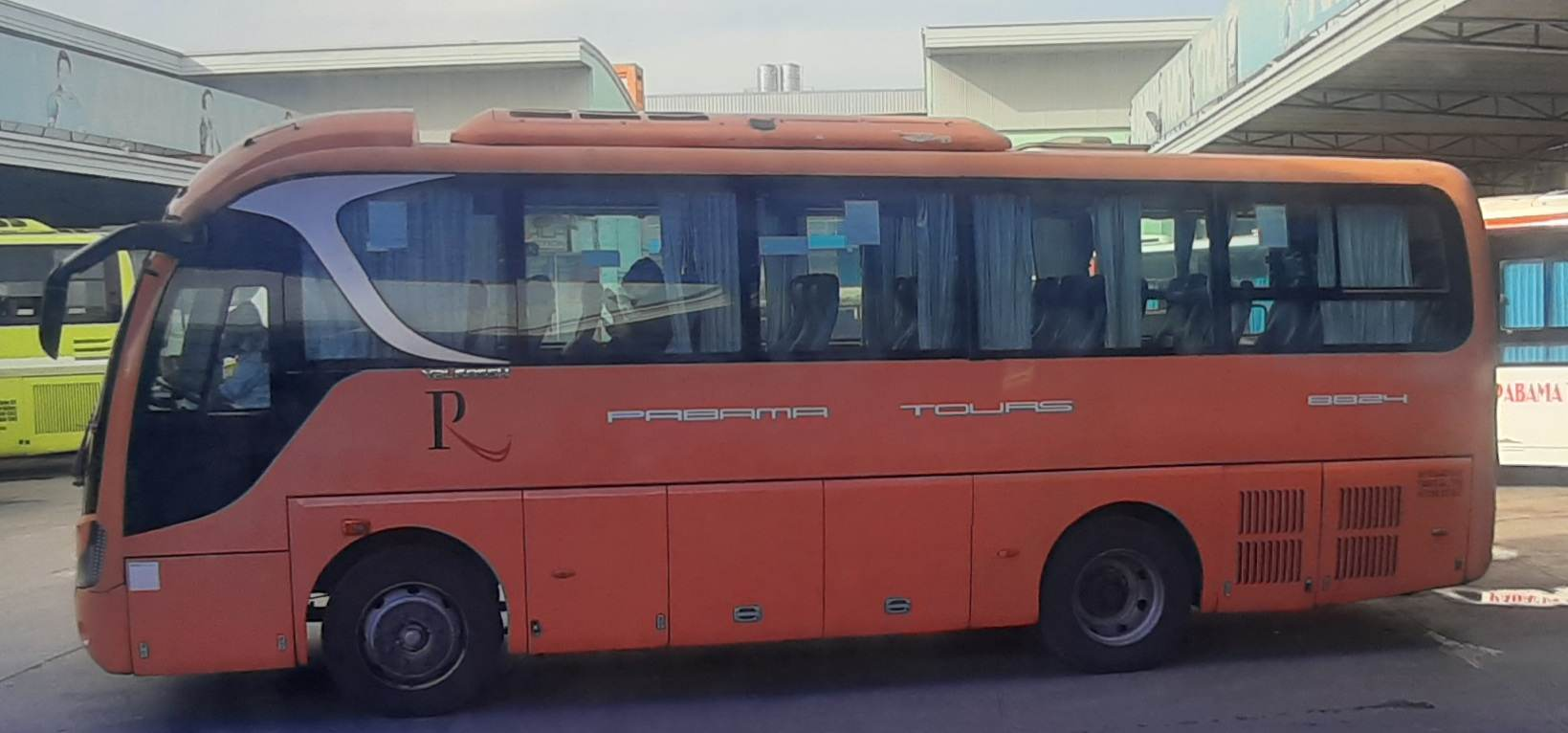
Yaxing YBL6855H2QCP

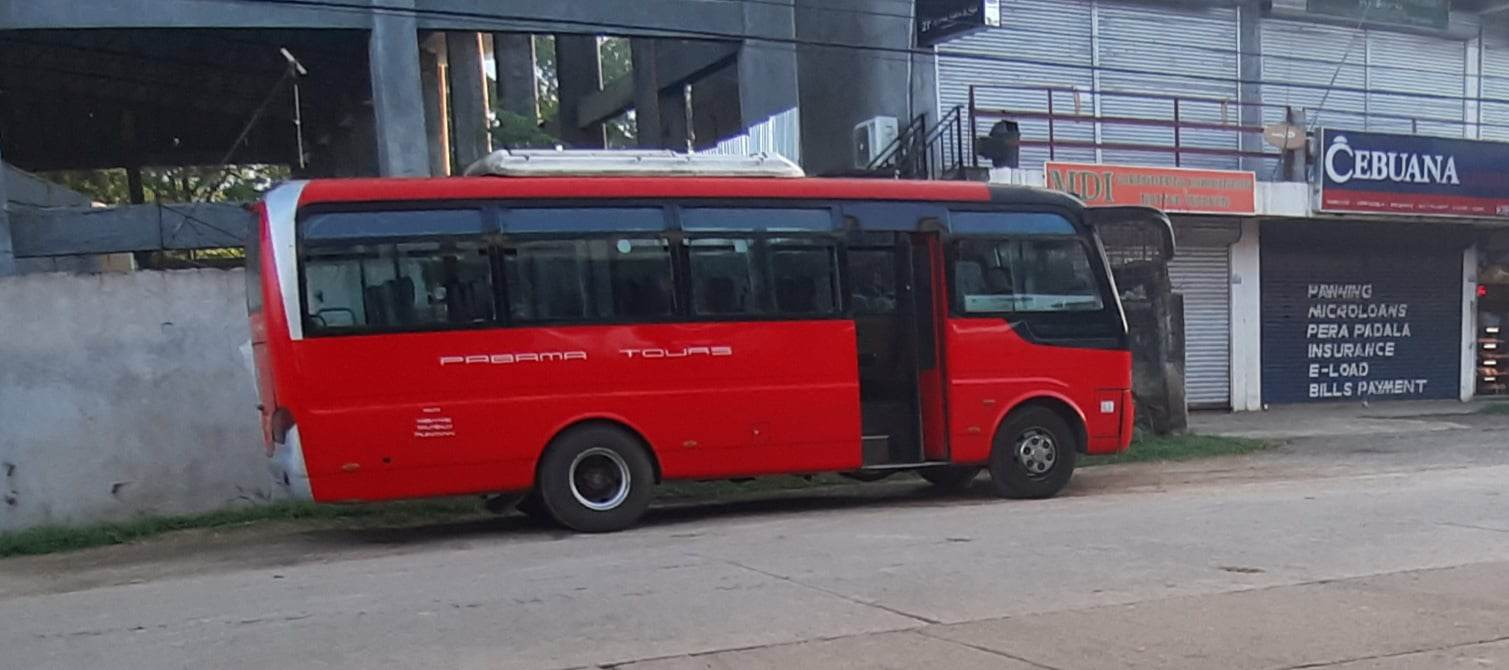
Ankai HK6738K coaster minibus

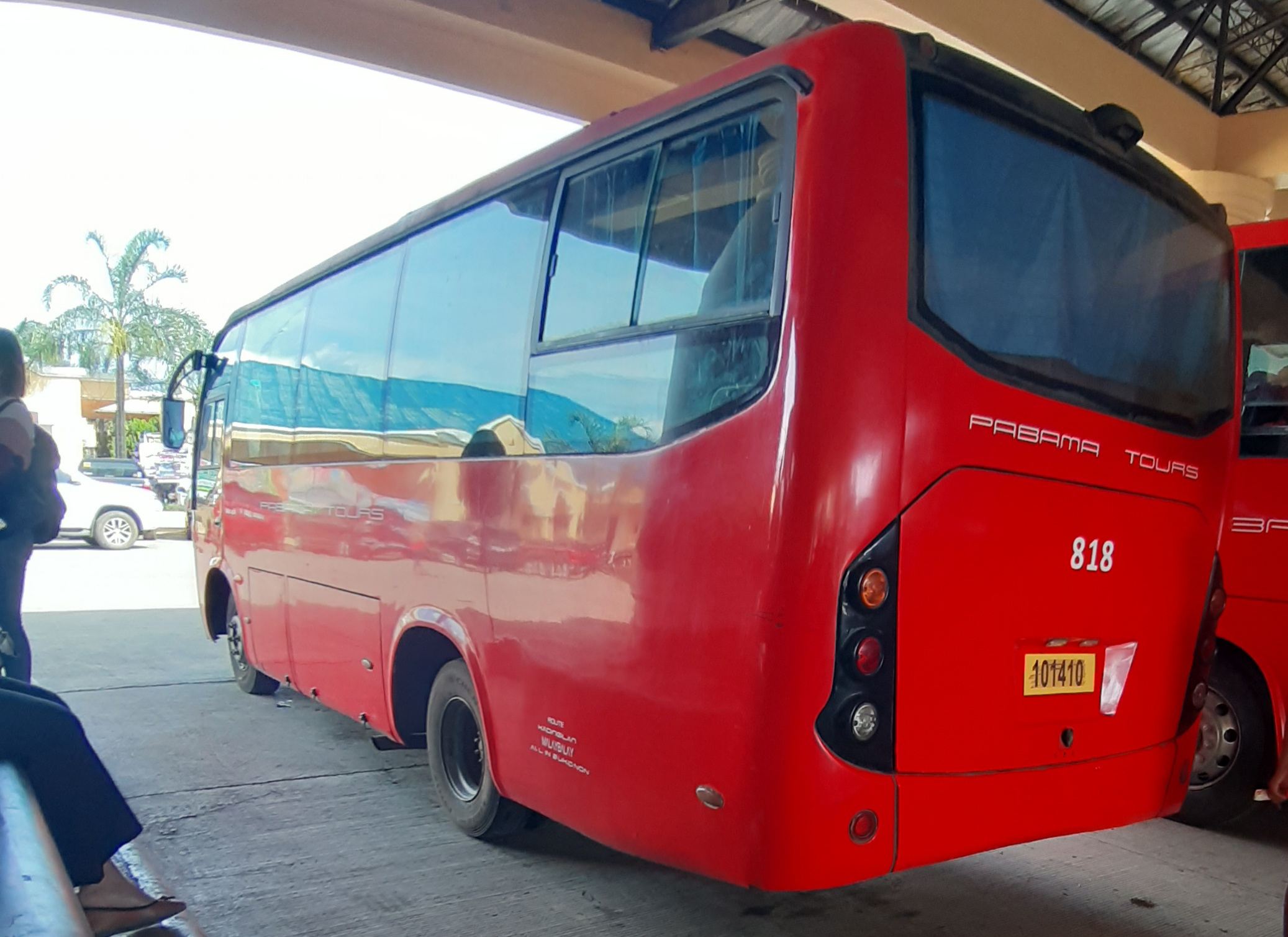
Asiastar JS6603GB coaster minibus
- Zhongtong LCK6148HD Navigator double decker
- Zhongtong LCK6128H Magnate
- Zhongtong LCK6129HD Magnate sleeper variant
- Zhongtong LCK6118H Elegance
- Ankai HFF6108
- Ankai HK6738K
- Yaxing YBL6855H2QCP
- Asiastar JS6603GB
- Aspire Daewoo Ankai HFF6108 non-aircon replica
- Locally-built coaches

== Routes of service ==
All the listed routes below are serviced vice versa.

- Cagayan de Oro to Kibawe via Malaybalay, Valencia, Maramag, Don Carlos
- Malaybalay to Kadingilan via Valencia, Maramag, Don Carlos, Kibawe
- Malaybalay to Damulog via Valencia, Maramag, Don Carlos, Kibawe
- Cagayan de Oro to Gingoog via Balingoan, Jasaan, Villanueva

Ever since the company expanded its operations across northern Mindanao, it had been proposing to enter the routes of Cagayan de Oro to Davao and Cagayan de Oro to Butuan.

== See also ==
- List of bus companies of the Philippines
- Rural Transit of Mindanao
- Super Five Transport
