= Labo Airport =

Airport in Ozamiz, Misamis Occidental, Philippines

Labo Airport Tugpahanan sa Labo Paliparan ng Labo
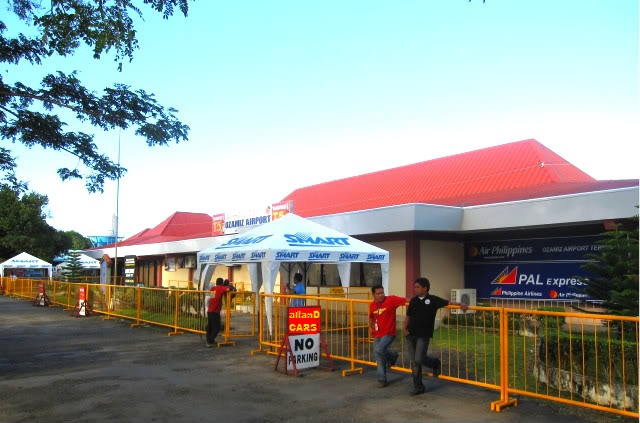
- Exterior of Labo Airport
- IATA: OZC; ICAO: RPMO

Summary
- Airport type: Public
- Owner/Operator: Civil Aviation Authority of the Philippines
- Serves: Misamis Occidental
- Location: Barangay Labo, Ozamiz, Misamis Occidental, Philippines
- Elevation AMSL: 5 m (16 ft)
- Coordinates: 08°10′42.69″N 123°50′28.99″E

Map
- Location within Mindanao mainland Location within Philippines

Runways
Direction	Length		Surface
Direction	m	ft	Surface
03/21	1,745	5,725	Asphalt

Statistics (2017)
- Passengers: 294,661
- Aircraft movements: 2,756
- Kilograms of cargo: 5,308,308
- Source: Statistics from eFOI

Labo Airport (IATA: OZC, ICAO: RPMO), also known as Ozamiz Airport, is an airport serving the general area of the city of Ozamiz in the Philippines. It is the only airport in the province of Misamis Occidental. The airport is classified as a community airport by the Civil Aviation Authority of the Philippines, a body of the Department of Transportation that is responsible for the operations of not only this airport but also of all other airports in the Philippines except the major international airports. It is one of only two community airports in the Philippines with commercial operations, but one of the busiest in Mindanao in terms of aircraft movement and passenger traffic.

The airport takes its name from its location, Barangay Labo in Ozamiz City.

Ozamiz Airport also serves the cities of Oroquieta and Tangub, some municipalities of Zamboanga del Sur, Lanao del Norte and some parts of Lanao del Sur.

== History ==
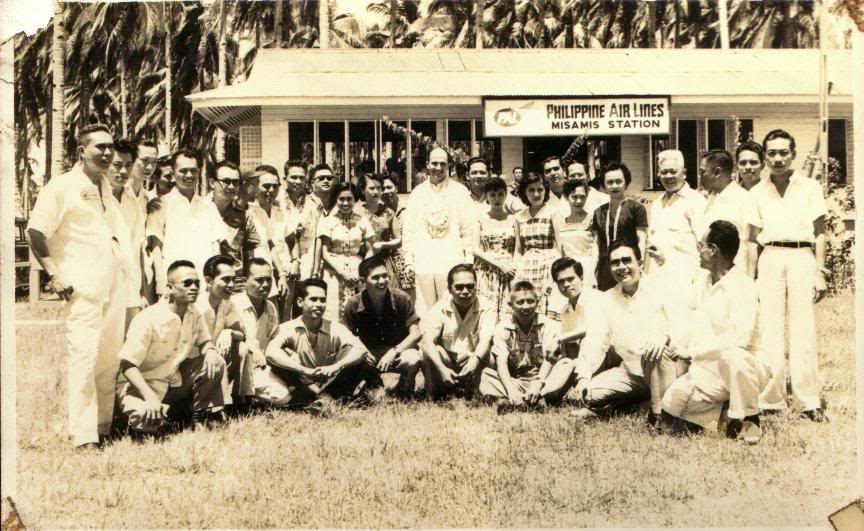
Misamis Airfield (now Ozamiz Airport) with the persons involved in the airport, circa 1950s

It was known as Misamis Airfield during the Pre-World War II and Post-World War II until the municipality received cityhood status in 1948 and it was changed to Ozamiz Airport. Philippine Airlines, the first airline to operate the airport, served regular air service to this airport using the McDonnell Douglas DC-3 from Manila. In the 1980s-90s, Philippine Airlines used their Fokker 50 and Sunriser planes to/from Manila and Cebu until the closure of the airport.

The airport was closed in 1998 after Philippine Airlines stopped the operation of their smaller Fokker and Sunriser planes because its runway could not accommodate jetliners and wide-bodied aircraft.

On July 11, 2007, Ozamiz Airport was re-opened to the public with former President Gloria Macapagal Arroyo and the provincial and city officials joining the ceremonial event. PAL's subsidiary, PAL Express (then known as Air Philippines), was the first airline to land using the Boeing 737-200, the first jet plane to land during the opening of the airport.

On November 10, 2008, Cebu Pacific Air launched its Ozamiz-Cebu route using their ATR 72-500.

On June 16, 2009, after the expansion, widening of the runway, and passing the runway jet requirement, a Cebu Pacific Airbus A319 successfully landed at the airport.

Currently, the airport is serving Manila flights using Cebu Pacific and PAL Express' Airbus A320, while Cebu flights are only operated by Cebgo's ATR 72-600.

== Rehabilitation and expansion ==
Extension and expansion of the airport runway started in 2005 using congressional funds of Misamis Occidental District 2 Congresswoman Herminia Ramiro. It was reopened to commercial flights on July 8, 2007, with Air Philippines offering direct Ozamiz-Manila routes.

Expansion and development of the airport particularly its runway, tarmac and passenger terminal building continued on the First Quarter of 2008.

In July 2009, implementation of the asphalt overlay began for the entire runway, apron and taxiway. This includes the setting up of runway lights to accommodate night flight operations.

On November 29, 2018, President Rodrigo Duterte led the groundbreaking ceremony of the new passenger terminal as part of the modernization project of the airport. The entire cost of the project is about P922 million. It is also part of the Build! Build! Build! program of the administration.

== Airlines and destinations ==
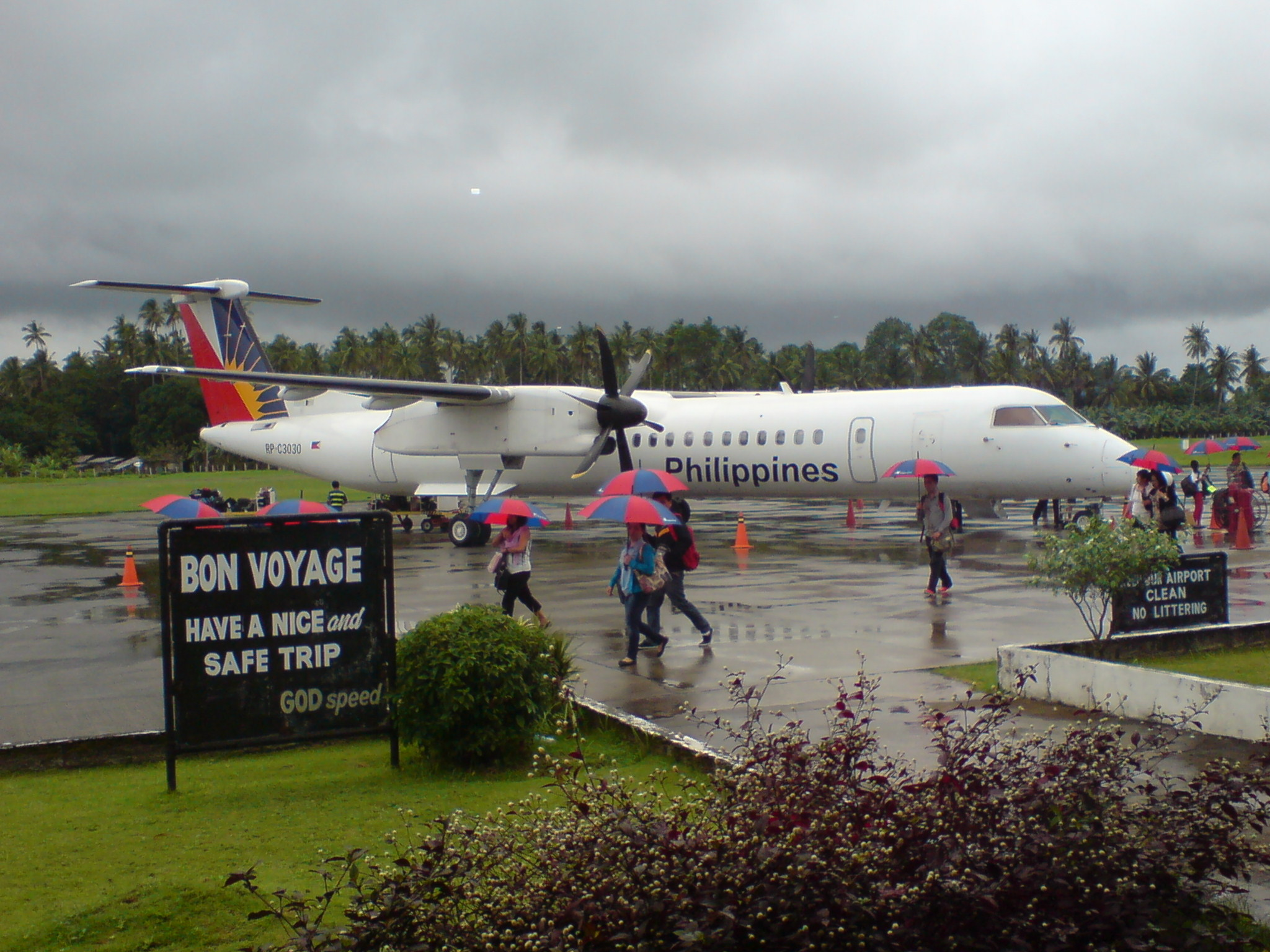
A PAL Express De Havilland Canada Dash 8 Q400 bound for Cebu awaits passengers at the airport's ramp.

Airlines	Destinations
Cebgo	Cebu
Cebu Pacific	Manila
PAL Express	Manila

== Statistics ==
Year	Passenger movement	Percentage increase and country rank
2007	20,618	100% - 29th
2008	80,290	▲289.42% - 24th
2009	161,048	▲100.58% - 22nd
2010	206,428	▲28.18% - 19th
2011	228,956	▲10.91% - 18th
2012	272,850	▲19.05% - 18th
2013	424,216	▲55.46% - 18th
2014	224,253	▼47.14% - 21st
2015	218,985	▼2.35% - 22nd
2016	290,996	▲32.88% - 19th
2017	294,661	▲1.26%
2018	333,891	▲13.31%
2019	371,945	▲11.40%
2020	129,092	▼65.29% - 19th
2021	78,342	▼39.31%
2022	251,333	▲220.82%
2023	320,295	▲27.43%

Year	Cargo movement	Percentage increase
2016	5,437,415	▲31.24%
2015	4,143,110	▲5.55%
2014	3,925,413	▼13.98%
2013	4,563,663	▲23.43%
2012	3,697,311	▲11.02%
2011	3,330,270	▲17.27%
2017	5,308,308	▼2.37%
2018	5,822,719	▲9.69%
2019	5,998,308	▲3.02%
2020	1,276,481	▼78.72%
2021	1,394,338	▲9.23%
2022	2,713,614	▲94.62%
2023	4,195,952	▲54.63%
2007	598,643	100%
2008	1,562,986	▲161.09%
2009	1,132,412	▼27.55%
2010	2,839,732	▲150.77%

Year	Aircraft movement	Percentage increase
2016	2,314	▲14.67
2015	2,018	▼2.98%
2014	2,080	▼27.52%
2013	2,870	▲11.50%
2012	2,574	▼1.23%
2011	2,606	▲37.01%
2017	2,256	▼2.51%
2018	3,217	▲42.60%
2019	3,596	▲11.78%
2020	976	▼256.44%
2021	1,052	▲7.79%
2022	2,608	▲147.91%
2023	2,730	▲4.68%
2010	1,902	▲15.55%
2009	1,646	203.69%
2008	542	32.84%
2007	408	100%
