= 1955 Lanao earthquake =

Earthquake in Mindanao, Philippines

- Location within Mindanao mainland Location within Philippines
- UTC time: 1955-03-31 18:17:13
- ISC event: 889384
- USGS-ANSS: ComCat
- Local date: April 1, 1955
- Local time: 02:17:13 (UTC+8)
- Magnitude: 7.4 M_{w}
- Depth: 35 km (22 mi)
- Epicenter: 7.66°N 123.16°E
- Fault: Cotabato-Sindangan Fault
- Type: Strike-slip
- Areas affected: Mindanao
- Total damage: $5 million (1955 rate)
- Max. intensity: MMI VIII (Severe)
- Casualties: 465 deaths 898 injured

The 1955 Lanao earthquake struck Lanao del Sur on April 1 at 02:17 local time. The earthquake measuring 7.4 on the moment magnitude scale and assigned a maximum intensity of VIII (Severe) on the Modified Mercalli intensity scale was one of the largest to hit Mindanao. It caused immense damage around the northern and central parts of Mindanao, as well as the southern reaches of Visayas. It killed at least 465 individuals and injured a further 898.

== Geological setting ==
Both provinces of Lanao del Sur and Lanao del Norte run along two main faults, the western extension of the Mindanao Fault (Cotabato–Sindangan) and the northern segment of the Cotabato Trench. The two faults were formed by the collision of the Philippine Sea Plate and Sunda Plate. In between the two faults lie the Philippine Mobile Belt, a region the takes up most of the western regions of the Philippines. It hosts multiple faults and active seismic blocks from southern Luzon to the Cotabato Trench. The Cotabato Trench itself caused two earthquakes in 1918 (M_{w} 8.3) and 1976 (M_{w} 8.0). The last significant earthquake to happen in the same area as the 1955 event was a magnitude 6.0 earthquake on April 12, 2017.

== Earthquake ==
The earthquake struck at dawn. Multiple magnitudes vary from moment magnitudes of 7.4–7.6 by local seismographs. It was assigned an intensity of VIII on the Rossi–Forel scale. Most earthquakes that occur along the Cotabato Trench displays a strike-slip mechanism, which may be that of the 1955 earthquake.

Multiple foreshocks preceded the mainshock, the largest measuring 6.3 occurred 6 hours earlier. It was first believed to be a double earthquake with the mainshock, however it was later confirmed to be a foreshock. Aftershocks also struck the area with varying magnitudes.

== Damage and casualties ==
Most damage was centered around Lanao Lake, more specifically the city of Dansalan (now known as Marawi). Numerous mosques were damaged or destroyed completely. Local houses and infrastructures collapsed due to the strong acceleration of ground movement. Towns southwest of the Lanao Lake were said to have been submerged underwater for a few years due to ground displacement by a few meters in a southward direction, causing a miniature tsunami to that permanently flood the towns. The death toll from ranged from 225 to 465 according to multiple accounts, and injuries were counted near a thousand. In Misamis Occidental, the city of Ozamiz was also greatly affected. The earthquake caused the destruction of both the city's parish church and the southwest bastion of the Fuerte de la Concepcion y del Triunfo, a Spanish fort that was built in the 18th-century. The president at the time of the event, Ramon Magsaysay, declared a state of calamity in the provinces of Misamis Occidental, Misamis Oriental, Lanao, and Surigao.

=== Religious implications ===
The earthquake was deemed a sign from God towards those who sinned against him. This was due to the large religious Muslim and Christian populations that were present in the areas near the epicenter. The Bible and Quran were often cited and repeated during the aftermath by preachers and locals. During the earthquake itself, cries of children were heard along with chanting and prayers.

== See also ==
- List of earthquakes in the Philippines
- List of earthquakes in 1955
