= Super Five Transport =

Bus company in the Philippines

Super 5 Land Transport and Services Inc.

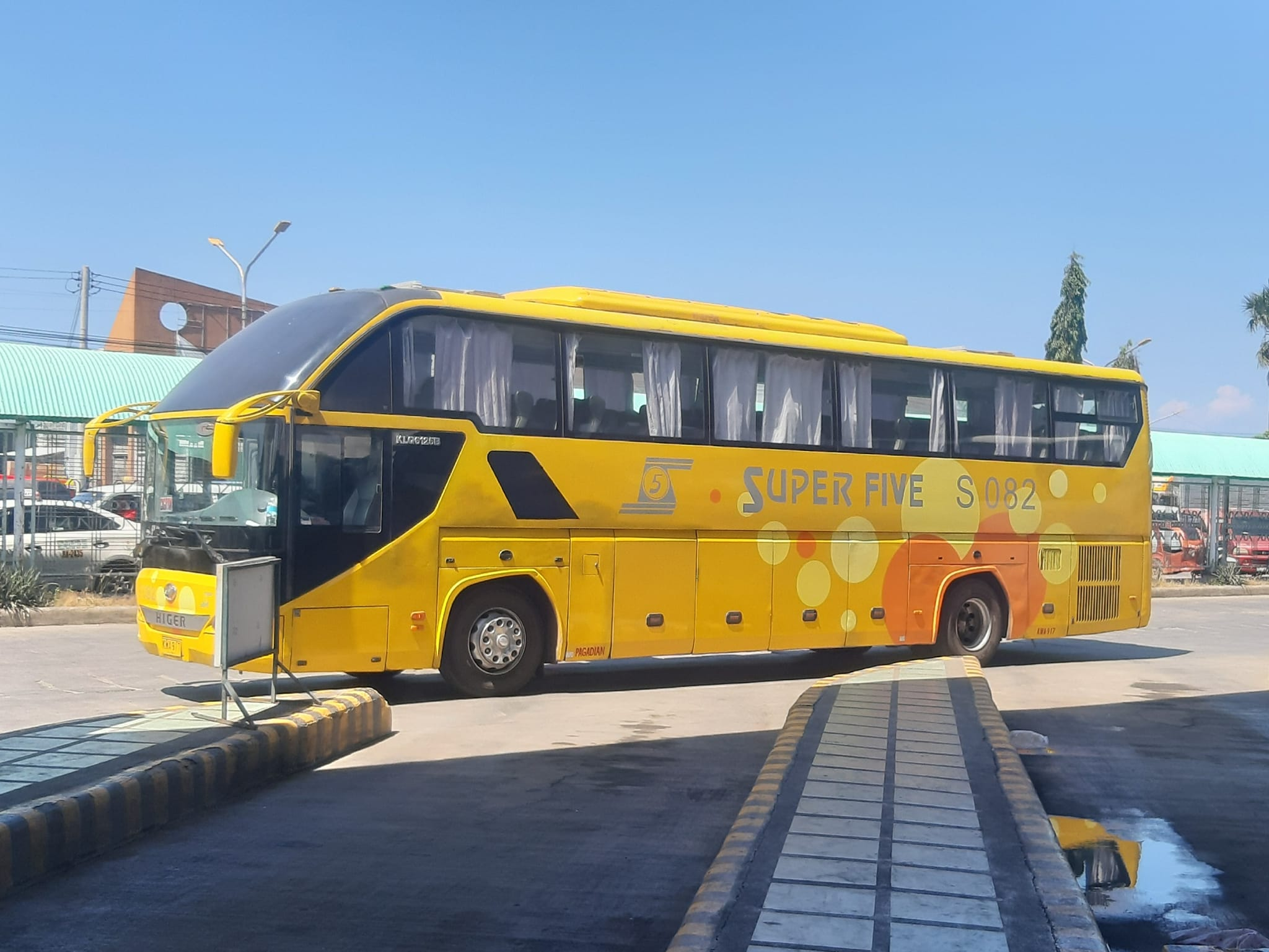
- Super Five bus in Bulua Westbound Bus Terminal, Cagayan de Oro
- Founded: May 5, 1987; 39 years ago
- Headquarters: Tambo, Brgy. Hinaplanon, Iligan City, Philippines
- Service area: Northern Mindanao; Zamboanga Peninsula
- Service type: Provincial Operation
- Hubs: Cagayan de Oro; Iligan
- Fleet: 100+ units (Yutong & Higer)
- Operator: Super 5 Land Transport and Services Inc.
- CEO: Paul P. Padayhag (Chairman)

Super 5 Land Transport and Services Inc. formerly known as Super Five Transport, is a bus company based in Iligan City, Philippines. It operates bus transport services in Northern Mindanao and Zamboanga Peninsula with its main hubs in Cagayan de Oro and Iligan.

== History ==
Super 5 Land Transport and Services was established on May 5, 1987, by Paul Padayhag of Iligan City. It first served the Cagayan–Iligan–Pagadian route using Philippines-made Mercedes-Benz buses. Years later, they added Cagayan–Iligan–Ozamiz–Dipolog and Cagayan–Valencia–Wao routes.

Despite a history of financial setbacks and temporary unit confiscations by the authorities due to violations, the company managed to compete with its rival in the region, Rural Transit.

== Fleet ==
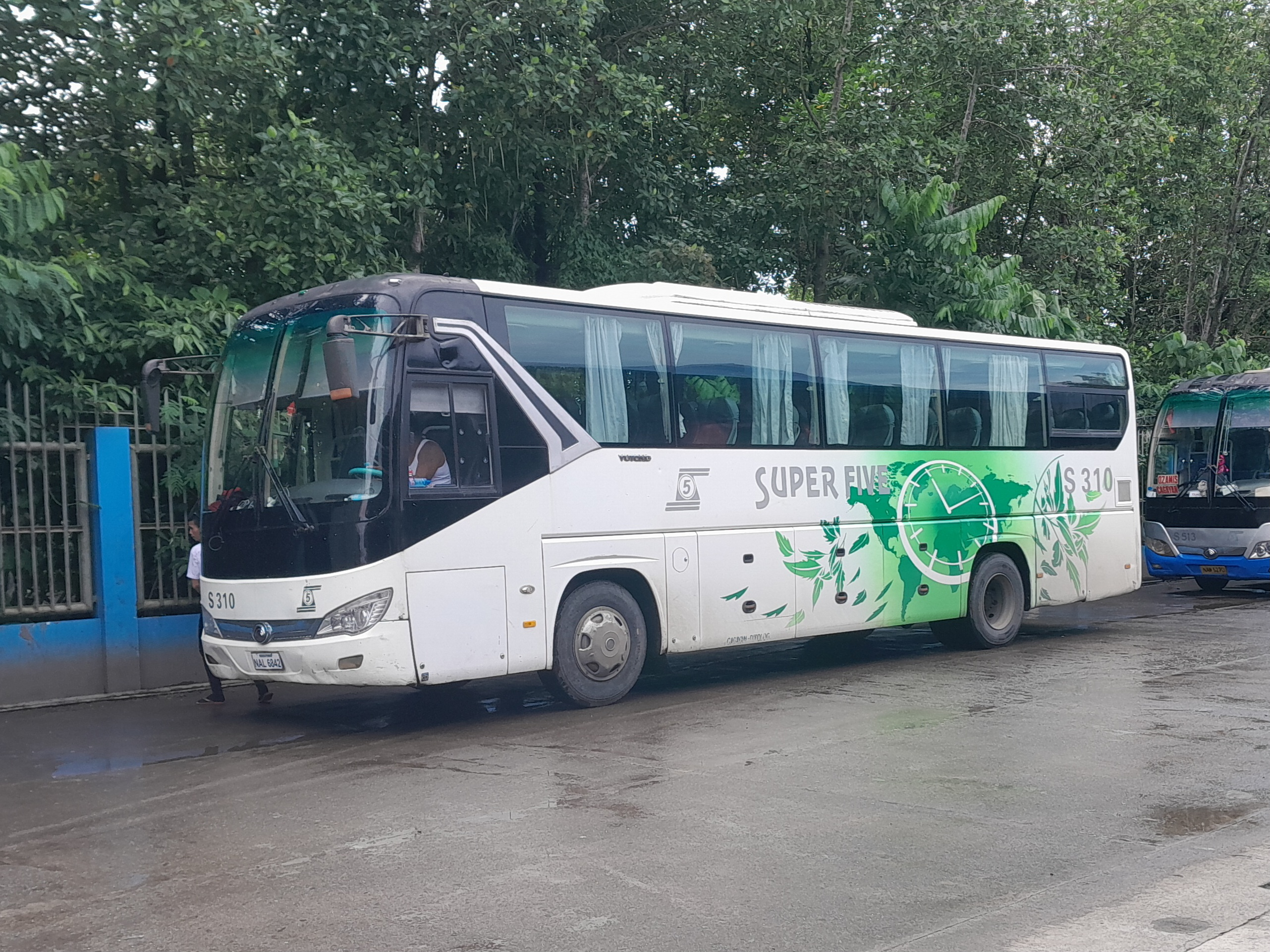
Super Five bus in Dipolog, Zamboanga del Norte

The first bus units of Super 5 came from Nissan Diesel and Mercedes-Benz. During the 2010s, however, they altogether decommissioned those units and replaced them with those from Chinese bus manufacturers Yutong and Higer, making them the first company in Mindanao to have units from Chinese bus manufacturers.

The company is also the first in Mindanao to use diesel-electric hybrid buses for their fleet, which they bought from Higer in year 2018.

The fleet is composed of:

- Higer KLQ6112H
- Higer KLQ6112HEQ30
- Higer KLQ6125B
- Higer KLQ6125BA
- Higer KLQ6115HZAHEVE50E
- Higer KLQ6115HZ
- Higer KLQ6858Q
- Higer KLQ6116Y
- Yutong ZK6119H2
- Yutong ZK6107HA
- Yutong ZK6105H
- Yutong ZK6878H
- King Long XMQ6112AY

Former Fleet

- Higer KLQ6123K
- Yutong ZK6122HD9
- Yutong ZK6127H

== Routes ==
- Cagayan de Oro – Wao (via Valencia) (suspended)
- Cagayan de Oro – Dipolog (via Oroquieta)
- Cagayan de Oro – Pagadian (via Kapatagan)
- Cagayan de Oro – Maramag (via Valencia)
- Cagayan de Oro – Tubod (via Iligan)
- Cagayan de Oro – Kibawe (via Valencia – Maramag) (suspended)
- Dipolog – Ozamiz (via Oroquieta)

== See also ==
- Vallacar Transit
- Lilian Express
- Pabama Transport
- List of bus companies of the Philippines
