= List of festivals in the Philippines =

The origin of most early Philippine festivals, locally known as fiestas (Filipino: pista or kapistahan), is rooted in Christianity during the Spanish colonial period. Many barrios and towns were assigned patron saints, and celebrations were encouraged to coincide with Christian holy days. According to historians, these patronal festivals served as a means of promoting Christian practices while blending elements of precolonial rituals and communal gatherings.

Festivals in the Philippines may be religious, cultural, or both. They are held to honor patron saints, commemorate local history, celebrate a bountiful harvest, or promote community products. Common activities include Masses, processions, parades, trade fairs, concerts, pageants, theatrical plays, and various contests and games. Not all festivals are Christian in origin; some are rooted in Islamic or indigenous traditions. There are more than 42,000 major and minor festivals nationwide, most celebrated at the barangay level. Some large observances, such as Holy Week and Christmas, are declared public holidays and are observed throughout the country.

== List ==
The partial calendar list contains several of the oldest and larger religious and/or cultural festivals in the country. Each town, city, and village has a dedicated fiesta, resulting in thousands held throughout the year; a few are national in character. Some fiestas may contain multiple/conflicting dates and/or place entries.

=== January ===
Name	Date	Location	Notes
Binalbal Festival	1	Tudela, Misamis Occidental	
Baggak Festival	5-11	Bauang, La Union	Celebrates the municipality's founding anniversary
Kuraldal Festival	6	Sasmuan, Pampanga	Honours the town's patroness, Saint Lucy
Hinagdanan Festival	9	Dauis, Bohol	Celebrates the rich history of the cave and the Barangay Bingag founding anniversary every 9th Day of January
Hinugyaw Festival	5-10	Koronadal City	Celebrates the city's founding anniversary
Lingayen Gulf Landing Anniversary	9	Lingayen, Pangasinan	Commemorates the landing of General Douglas MacArthur and the Allied Forces in Luzon in 1945.
Feast of the Black Nazarene	9	Quiapo, Manila	Commemorates the translation of the image of the Black Nazarene to Quiapo Church in 1789.
Coconut Festival	1st to 2nd week	San Pablo City, Laguna	Honors St. Paul the first hermit, town patron. Also highlights the coconut, the primary crop of the city. Festival usually lasts a week.
Minasa Festival	2nd week	Bustos, Bulacan	named after the Minasa, a cassava-based cookie
Batingaw Festival	13	Cabuyao	commemorates the legendary golden bell of Cabuyao
Halad Festival	3rd Sunday	Midsayap, Cotabato	Honours the Santo Niño
Feast of the Santo Niño	3rd Sunday	National	Liturgical feast of the Santo Niño de Cebú according to the Philippine National Liturgical Calendar.
Sinulog Festival	3rd Sunday	Cebu, Cebu City (variants in Kabankalan City, Maasin City, Balingasag, Cagayan de Oro, Butuan, Pagadian, and Southern Leyte throughout the years)	Honours the Santo Niño de Cebú
Tuba Festival	20	Borbon, Cebu	Honours the town's patron, Saint Sebastian.
Bayluhay Festival	3rd week	San Joaquin, Iloilo	Commemorates the landing of the ten Bornean datus and the historic barter of Panay Island
Bambanti Festival	Third week of January	Isabela Province	Highlights the scarecrow (Ilocano: bambanti and celebrates the farmers' abundant harvest
Ati-Atihan Festival	15-21	Kalibo, Aklan	Honours the Santo Niño, and the legendary meeting of the island’a aboriginal peoples with settlers from Borneo
Batan Ati-Ati Malakara Festival	3rd weekend	Batan, Aklan	
Sikhayan Festival	18	Santa Rosa City, Laguna	Honors the resilience and perseverance of the people of Santa Rosa
Dugoy Festival	18	Sablayan, Occidental Mindoro	Celebrates unity in nature conservation in Sablayan
Pana-Pana Festival	20	Tarlac, Tarlac	
Feast of San Sebastian Martir	20	Lumban, Laguna	Honours the town's patron, Saint Sebastian
Longganisa Festival	22	Vigan City	Celebrates Vigan's accession to cityhood in 2001
Bulak Festival	22	San Ildefonso, Bulacan	Bulak Festival is San Ildefonso's official town festival. Primarily, the festival is celebrated in honor of the town's patron, San Ildefonso but it also gives honor to the "kapok" plant, also known as "bulak" which played a very important part in the town's history. BULAK is actually San Ildefonso's old name when it was still just a barrio under the neighboring town of San Rafael.
Feast of San Ildefonso de Toledo	22–24	Tanay, Rizal	Honours the patron of Barangay San Ildefonso, Saint Ildefonsus.
Halamanan Festival	23	Guiguinto, Bulacan	Celebrated as a token of gratitude of town residents to Guiguinto's patron saint St. Ildephonsus (San Ildefonso), and showcases the town's garden and landscape industry.
Pabirik Festival	January 23 to February 2	Paracale, Camarines Norte	Celebrates the province's gold mining industry
Kasadyahan Festival	4th Saturday	Iloilo City Proper	Showcases the best festivals of the different provinces and towns across the Western Visayas. _{The date may change soon as it has been separated from the Dinagyang Festival since 2020}
Dinagyang Festival	4th Sunday	Iloilo City	Honours the Santo Niño and the pact between the island's aboriginal peoples and migrant Bornean Datus
Ibajay Ati-Ati Municipal and Devotional Fiesta	4th Sunday	Ibajay, Aklan	Honours the Santo Niño
Kannawidan 'Ylocos' Festival	January 27 to February 12	Ilocos Sur	
Dinagsa Ati-Atihan Festival	Last week	Cadiz	
Hirinugyaw-Suguidanonay Festival	Last week	Calinog, Iloilo	
Santo Niño de Malolos Festival	Last Sunday	Malolos City	Honours the Santo Niño de Malolos
Candle Festival	January 31 to February 2	Candelaria, Quezon	Liturgical Feast of the Purification of the Blessed Virgin Mary or Candlemas according to the General Roman Calendar

=== February ===
Name	Date	Location	Notes
Bambanti Festival	February	Isabela province	Scarecrows and harvest festival
World War II Anniversary	February	World War II sites	
Pista Sintura	February	Cotabato City	
Kaamulan Festival	February (2nd week) to Mar 10	Malaybalay City, Bukidnon	gathering of Bukidnon's ethnic tribes
Hamaka Festival	February (3rd sunday)	Taytay, Rizal	
Pahimis Festival	February (2nd week)	Amadeo, Cavite	
Pistang Bayan alay kay Sta. Marta	February (2nd Sunday)	Pateros, Metro Manila	In honor of town's patroness Santa Marta de Pateros, featuring Pandangguhan Festival (local folk dance competition), "Pagoda" or fluvial parade, and "Cedera" or street selling/night market.
Paraw Regatta Festival	February (3rd Sunday), (21–22)	Arevalo, Iloilo City	Features racing events between paraws, or Visayan double-outrigger sailboats, from Villa Beach in Arevalo, Iloilo City across Iloilo Strait to the coast of Guimaras
Kalilangan Festival	February (4th week), (20–27)	General Santos	
Hot Air Balloon (Clark Festival)	February (early Feb.)	Clark Special Economic Zone, Pampanga	annual tournament of balloonist
Chinese New Year	February (early Feb.)	nationwide	Lunar new year celebrations in Filipino-Chinese communities
Festival of Hearts	February (month long)	Tanjay City	
The Philippine International Arts Festival (PIAF)	February (whole month)	nationwide	
Sumilang Festival	Feb 1 to Feb 2	Silang, Cavite	Honours Our Lady of the Candles
Pedrista Festival (Feast of San Pedro Bautista)	First Sunday / Week of February	Quezon City	Honours San Pedro Bautista (a Franciscan Martyr) who lived in Quezon City and Founded San Francisco del Monte (Frisco); San Pedro Bautista is one of the Patron Saints of Quezon City
Bicol Arts Festival	Feb 1 to Feb 28	Legazpi City	
National Arts Month	Feb 1 to Feb 28	nationwide	
Suroy sa Surigao	Feb 1 to Feb 28	Surigao City	
Salakayan Festival	Feb 1 to Feb 6	Miag-ao, Iloilo	
Lavandero Festival	Feb 1 to Feb 6	Mandaluyong	
Pamulinawen Festival	Feb 2 to Feb 10, or 7–10	Laoag City	Honours the city's patron, Saint William of Maleval
Dagkot Festival	Feb 2	Cabadbaran	
Panranumag Festival	Feb 3	Corcuera, Romblon	Simara Island
Feast of Our Lady of Candles	Feb 2	Jaro, Iloilo City	In honour of patroness of Jaro and the whole Western Visayas, Nuestra Señora de la Candelaria de Jaro (Our Lady of the Candles)
The International Bamboo Organ Festival	Feb 3 to Feb 11	Las Piñas	10-day series of cultural events
Guling-Guling Festival	February (day before Ash Wednesday)	Paoay, Ilocos Norte	
Kali-Kalihan Harvest Festival	Feb 6	Salvador Benedicto, Negros Occidental	
Fiesta Tsinoy	Feb 6	Legazpi City	
Utanon Festival	Feb 6	Dalaguete, Cebu	
Kalesa Festival	Feb 7	Laoag City	
Pagoda sa Daan & Pandangguhan Festival	Feb 8	Pateros	
Fistahan	Feb 9 to Feb 15	Davao City	
Davao Chinese New Year	Feb 9 to Feb 17	Davao City	
Mandaluyong Liberation Day & Cityhood Anniversary	Feb 9	Mandaluyong	
Bulang-Bulang Festival	Feb 9	San Enrique, Negros Occidental	
Patunob Festival	Feb 10 to Feb 11	Binuangan, Misamis Oriental	
Taytay Hamaka Festival	Feb 10 to Feb 16, or 9–15	Taytay, Rizal	7-day event showcasing artistry and craftsmanship
Bod-bod Kabog Festival	Feb 10	Catmon, Cebu	
Aquero Festival	Feb 11 to Feb 13	Aglipay, Quirino	
Pabalhas sa Tablas	Feb 11	Candoni, Negros Occidental	
Spring Festival (Chinese Lunar New Year)	Feb 11	Iriga City	
Tinagba Festival	Feb 11	Iriga City (Bicol)	harvest festival, Our Lady of Lourdes
Palanyag Festival	Feb 12	Parañaque	
Tiburin Horse Race	Feb 12	Pasay	
Pamaypay ng Caloocan Festival	Feb 12	Caloocan	
Sambalilo Hat Festival	Feb 13 to Feb 19	Parañaque	
Local Media Familiarization Festival	Feb 13 to Feb 19	Cagayan de Oro	
Feast Day of Santa Clara	Feb 13	Pasay	
Pasayaw Festival	Feb 14 to Feb 17	Padre Burgos, Quezon	
Suman Festival (Aurora Foundation Day)	Feb 14 to Feb 19, (3rd week)	Baler, Aurora	
Ollalion (Ullalim) Festival (Kalinga Foundation Day)	Feb 14, or 11–14	Tabuk City	celebrates the Kalinga culture
Serenata	Feb 14	Pasay	
Apayao Province Foundation	Feb 14	Apayao	
Timpuyog Festival	Feb 14	Kiamba, Sarangani	
Menajak Festival	Feb 14	Calamba, Misamis Occidental	
Sorteo Grand Festival	Feb 16 to Feb 22 (every three years)	Carmona, Cavite	
Tawo–Tawo Festival	Feb 17	Bayawan	
Malasimbo Music and Arts Festival	Feb 18 to Feb 19	Puerto Galera, Oriental Mindoro	
Laguimanok Festival	Feb 13	Padre Burgos	
Kap'yaan Festival	Feb 19	Jose Abad Santos, Davao Occidental	
Sinacbang Festival	Feb 19	Sinacaban, Misamis Occidental	
Babaylan Festival (Babaylanes)	Feb 19	Bago	highlights the culture of the first settlers of Bago before the Spanish colonization
Dapil Festival (Bangued Town Fiesta)	Feb 20 to Feb 25	Bangued, Abra	
Mutya ng Caraga	Feb 20	Butuan	
Balsahan Festival	Feb 20	Sibunag, Guimaras	
Asinan Festival	Feb 20	San Lorenzo, Guimaras	
Sampaguita Festival	Feb 21 to Feb 22, (2nd week)	San Pedro City, Laguna	Honors St. Peter the apostle. Named after the Sampaguita
Buybuy Fest/Burgos Town Fiesta	Feb 21 to Feb 23	Burgos, La Union	
Wow Araw ng Caraga	Feb 22 to Feb 26	Caraga (regionwide)	
Panagtitimpuyog	Feb 23 to Feb 25	Nagtipunan, Quirino	
Caraga Anniversary	Feb 23 to Feb 25	Caraga	
Mahaguyog Festival	Feb 24 to Mar 7	Santo Tomas, Batangas	celebrates the abundance of mais, halaman, gulay and niyog, and highlights General Miguel Malvar
Cebu City Charter Day	Feb 24	Cebu City	
Sibug-Sibug Festival	Feb 24 or 17 – 26	Ipil, Zamboanga Sibugay	foundation day of Zamboanga Sibugay province
Caragan Festival	Feb 25 to Feb 26	Mabalacat, Pampanga	
Panagbenga Festival (Baguio Flower Festival)	Feb 26 (4th week)	Baguio	flower festival
Hil-o Hil-o Festival	Feb 26 to Feb 28	Ma-ayon, Capiz	
Death Anniversary of Baldomero Aguinaldo	Feb 26	Kawit, Cavite	
Dia de Zamboanga	Feb 26	Zamboanga City, or Zamboanga Sibugay	
Itik-Itik Festival	Feb 27, (last Sunday)	Pasig	native duck (itik)
Nangkaan Festival	Feb 27	Maigo, Lanao del Norte	
Maniambus Festival	Feb 27	Negros Occidental (provincewide)	
Sambayan Festival	Feb 28 to Mar 31	Tobias Fornier, Antique	

=== March ===
Part of Holy Week

Name	Date	Location	Notes (commemoration/main attraction(s)
Salubong at Ang Pasko ng Pangkabuhay (Feast of the Resurrection)	March	Parañaque	
Balayong Festival	Beginning of March	Palawan	
MAHAGUYOG Festival (Mais, Halaman, Gulay at Niyog)	March (1st week), (1–7)	Santo Tomas, Batangas	week-long celebration of seven-day feast in honor of St. Thomas Aquinas
Island Garden City of Samal Festival	March (1st week), (1–7)	Samal, Davao del Norte	week-long celebration of Samal's founding anniversary
Hinatdan Festival	March (2nd week)	Cebu City	
Witches Festival	March (Holy Week)	Siquijor	
Sumbrero Festival	March (no definite date)	Biñan, Laguna	
Say-am Festival	March (no definite date)	Calanasan, Apayao	
Kapayvanuvanua Festival	March to April (movable)	Mahatao, Batanes	
Turumba Festival	March or Apr 21 to Apr 26	Pakil, Laguna	seven-day feast in honor of Our Lady of Sorrows
Banga Anniversary Fiesta	Mar 1 to Mar 4	Banga, South Cotabato	
Dinagsa Festival	Mar 1 to Mar 5	Muntinlupa	
Tinikling	Mar 1 to Mar 6	Malaybalay City	
Araw ng Island Garden City of Samal (IGACOS Festival)	Mar 1 to Mar 7	Island Garden City of Samal	
Araw ng Tagum City	Mar 1 to Mar 7	Tagum City	
Parade of Festivals	Mar 1	Muntinlupa	
Sugbahan	Mar 2 to Mar 14	Davao City	
Malasimbo Music and Arts Festival – the Mangyan Cultural Festival	Mar 2 to Mar 4	Puerto Galera, Oriental Mindoro	
Pacto de Sangre (Blood Compact of New Washington, Aklan)	Mar 3	New Washington, Aklan	
Council of Balabago Reenactment	Mar 4 to Mar 5	Culasi, Antique	
Manchatchatong Festival	Mar 4 to Mar 6	Balbalan, Kalinga	
Puerto Princesa Foundation Day	Mar 4	Puerto Princesa City	
Ses'long Festival	Mar 5 to Mar 16	T'Boli, South Cotabato	
Ayyoweng de Lambak ed Tadian	Mar 5	Tadian, Mountain Province	
Tilapia Festival	Mar 5	Braulio E. Dujali, Davao del Norte	
Kamayadan Festival	Mar 6 to Mar 10	Norala, South Cotabato	
Boling-boling Festival	Mar 6 to Mar 8	Catanauan, Quezon	
Bulawan Festival	Mar 6 to Mar 8	Nabunturan, Davao de Oro	
Abrenian Kawayan Festival (Abra Foundation Day)	Mar 6 to Mar 9	Bangued, Abra	formerly known as Arya! Abra Festival; celebrates the founding of Abra province
Panagtagbo Festival	Mar 7	Tagum City	
Al-law ng Kalumunan	Mar 7	Nabunturan, Davao de Oro	
Anibina Bulawanun Festival	Mar 8 (culmination)	Davao de Oro	eight-day multi-themed annual festival
Anilag Festival	Mar 8 to Mar 15	Santa Cruz, Laguna	Celebrates the culture and progress of the province of Laguna
Holistic Festival	Mar 9 to Mar 11	Labrador, Pangasinan	
Bantayan Festival	Mar 9 to Mar 15	Guimbal, Iloilo	
Eid al-Fitr	Mar 9, or Aug 30	Region XII (regionwide)	
Penetensiyahan	Mar 9	Rosario, Batangas	
Araw ng Dabaw Celebration	Mar 10 to Mar 16	Davao City	celebration of Davao's Foundation Day as a chartered city
Anao Town Fiesta	Mar 13 to Mar 15	Anao, Tarlac	
Pintados de Passi Festival	Mar 14 to Mar 16, or Mar 11 to Mar 18	Passi City, Iloilo	History of Passi City
Delfin Albano Patronal Town Fiesta	Mar 14 to Mar 17	Delfin Albano, Isabela	
Sikaran Festival	Mar 15	Baras, Rizal	
Bacao Festival	Mar 16 to Mar 20	Echague, Isabela	
Semana Santa sa Iguig Calvary Hills	Mar 16 to Mar 23, (Holy Week)	Iguig, Cagayan	
Homonhon Landing Anniversary	Mar 16	Homonhon, Eastern Samar	discovery of the Philippines by Ferdinand Magellan
Lugahait Festival	Mar 16	Lugait, Misamis Oriental	
Magallanes Festival	Mar 16	Guiuan, Eastern Samar	
Pasayaw Festival	Mar 17	Canlaon, Negros Oriental	
Anitap Festival	Mar 17	Kapangan, Benguet	
Death Anniversary of Pres. Ramon Magsaysay	Mar 17	Castillejos, Zambales	Commemorates the death of President Ramon Magsaysay
Paynauen Festival	Apr 21 to Apr 23	Iba, Zambales	
Banana Festival	Mar 18 to Mar 19	Baco, Oriental Mindoro	
Peñablanca Patronal Town Fiesta	Mar 18 to Mar 19	Peñablanca, Cagayan	
Diadi Town Fiesta	Mar 18 to Mar 21	Diadi, Nueva Vizcaya	
Strawberry Festival	Mar (month-long)	La Trinidad, Benguet	strawberries and strawberry products
Soli-Soli Festival	Mar 18	San Francisco, Cebu	
Carabao Festival	Mar 19	San Jose, Romblon	Formerly known as Jones
Tabak Festival	Mar 19 to Mar 22	Tabaco City, Albay	
Baykat Festival/Aritao Town Fiesta	Mar 19 to Mar 22	Aritao, Nueva Vizcaya	
Sulyog Festival	Mar 19	Bongabong, Oriental Mindoro	
Barotorera Festival	Mar 19	Gingoog	
Dinamulag Festival	Mar to May(moveable)	Iba, Zambales	mangoes and its by-products
San Jose Fiesta	Mar 19	Davao de Oro	
Sinigayan Festival	Mar 19	Sagay City	Shell craft art
Araw ng Panabo	Mar 20 to Mar 31	Panabo City	
Pindangan Festival	Mar 20	San Fernando City, La Union	
Saginyogan Festival	Mar 21	Alcantara, Romblon	Tablas Island
Sabutan Festival	Mar 21 to Mar 23	Palanan, Isabela	
Kalap Festival	Mar 21	Calapan, Oriental Mindoro	
Alimango Festival	Mar 22	Lala, Lanao del Norte	
Torugpo	Mar 22	Carigara, Leyte	
Malaybalay City Chartered Day	Mar 22	Malaybalay City	
Tobacco Festival	Mar 23 to Mar 29	Candon City	
Ani Festival	Mar 23 to Mar 30	Dingras, Ilocos Norte	
19 Martyrs of Aklan	Mar 23	Kalibo, Aklan	
Salubong sa Angono	Mar 26 to Mar 27, (Holy Week)	Angono, Rizal	reunion of the Risen Christ with the Virgin Mary
Kisi-kisi Festival	Mar 27 to Mar 31	Negros Occidental	
Manok ni San Pedro Festival	Mar 27	San Pedro, Laguna	
Marcos Town Fiesta/Mannalon Festival	Mar 27	Marcos, Ilocos Norte	
Tobacco Festival	Mar 28 to Mar 29	Candon City	tobacco
Balut sa Puti Festival	Mar 29	Pateros, Metro Manila	Full moon hatching of duck eggs, co-celebrated with Araw ng Pateros (Pateros Foundation Day). Movable celebration if fall in any days of Holy Week.
Katkat sa Dipolog	Mar 28 to Apr 3	Dipolog	
Senakulo / Holy Week Rituals & Processions	Mar 28 to Apr 4	nationwide	
Cuaresma	Mar 28 to Apr 4	San Jose, Antique	
Parpaguha Festival	Mar 29	San Andres, Romblon	Tablas Island
Balot sa Puti Festival	Mar 29	Pateros	
Gawagaway-yan Kawayan Festival	Mar 30 to Apr 15	Cauayan	
Malibay Cenaculo	Mar 30 to Apr 8	Pasay	
Bangus Festival	Mar 30	Panabo City	
Sinugdan (Commemoration of the First Christian Mass)	Mar 31	Limasawa Island, Southern Leyte	commemoration of the first Christian mass
First Easter Mass Celebration	Mar 31	Butuan	
Holy Week	March to April	nationwide	week-long event honoring Jesus Christ's death on the Cross
Centurion Festival	March (Holy Week)	General Luna, Quezon	believed to be the origin of Marinduque's Moriones Festival
Kariton Festival	March	Licab, Nueva Ecija	carabao-pulled carts, thanksgiving and harvest festival
Moriones Festival	March (Holy Week), (Easter Sunday), or Apr 2 to Apr 7	Boac, Marinduque	part of Holy Week; commemorates Saint Longinus
Pagtaltal sa Guimaras (Ang Pagtaltal)	March (Good Friday), or Apr 5 to Apr 6	Jordan, Guimaras	procession of flagellants and devotees in biblical attire
Sugat Kabanhawan Festival	March to April (Easter Sunday)	Minglanilla, Cebu	celebrates the meeting of the Risen Christ and the sorrowful Mother Mary (Sugat), and the resurrection of Jesus (Kabanhawan).

=== April ===
Part of Holy Week

Name	Date range	Location	Notes (commemoration/main attraction(s)
Pantat Festival	April (2nd week)	Zarraga, Iloilo	
Manaoag Pilgrimage	April (2nd week)	Manaoag, Pangasinan	Nuestra Señora de Manaoag
Lami-Lamihan Festival	April (3rd week), (14 to 16)	Lamitan, Basilan	showcases the rich Yakan traditions
Mutya ng Taguig	April (3rd week)	Taguig	
Tanduyong Festival	April (4th Sunday)	San Jose, Nueva Ecija	harvest celebration
Kamarikutan Pagdiwata Arts Festival	April (fullmoon)	Puerto Princesa City	
Camote Festival/Bb. Zambales	April (movable)	Castillejos, Zambales	
Kinulob Festival	April (no definite date)	Mabini, Batangas	
Itik Festival	April (no definite date)	Victoria, Laguna	celebrates the Itik as chief product of the town
Kadahoman Festival	Apr 1 to 1 May	Lagonoy, Camarines Sur	
Tugbong Festival	Apr 1 to Apr 25	Pandan, Antique	
Panagabuos Festival	Apr 1 to Apr 3	Banna, Ilocos Norte	
Suroy Ta	Apr 1 to 31 May	Davao City	
Fiesta Pasiklab	Apr 1 to 31 May	Quezon City	
Banana Festival	Apr 1 to Apr 5	La Castellana, Negros Occidental	
Kesong Puti Festival	Apr 1 to Apr 9	Santa Cruz, Laguna	celebrates the Kesong Puti- a white carabao-milk cottage cheese
Linggo ng Palaspas or Domingo de Ramos	Apr 1	Parañaque	
Pandan Festival	Apr 3	Luisiana, Laguna	celebrates the pandan, the raw product for the weaving industry of the town
Summer Youth Festival	Apr 4 to Apr 25	Zamboanga del Sur	
Hudas-hudas	Apr 4	San Jose de Buenavista, Antique	
Libod-sayaw	Apr 4	Bindoy, Negros Oriental	
Sagrada Familia Fiesta	Apr 4	Laak, Davao de Oro	
Lenten Festival of Herbal Preparation	Apr 5 to Apr 6, (Easter Saturday)	Siquijor, Siquijor	
Kanidugan Festival	Apr 5	Odiongan, Romblon	
Senakulo	Apr 5 and Apr 7 (Maundy Thursday & Black Saturday)	Castillejos, Zambales	
Pilgrimage to Ermita Hill	Apr 5 to Apr 6 (Holy Week)	Casiguran / Baler, Aurora	
Semana Santa at Iguig Calvary Hills	Apr 5 to Apr 6	Iguig, Cagayan	
Pasko sa Kasakit (Semana Santa sa Bantayan)	Apr 5 to Apr 6	Bantayan, Cebu	
Semana Santa sa Bikol	Apr 5 to Apr 6	Calabanga, Camarines Sur	
Cenakulo (Cainta, Rizal)	Apr 5 to Apr 6	Cainta, Rizal	
Lenten Observance (San Pablo City)	Apr 5 to Apr 6	San Pablo City, Laguna	
Buhing Kalbaryo	Apr 5 to Apr 6	Cebu City	
Semana Santa (Dipolog)	Apr 5 to Apr 6	Dapitan	
Katkat Sakripisyo sa 3003 Steps	Apr 5 to Apr 6	Dipolog	
Live Stations of the Cross at San Carlos City	Apr 5 to Apr 6	San Carlos City, Negros Occidental	
Pagtaltal in Barotac Viejo	Apr 5 to Apr 6	Barotac Viejo, Iloilo	
Paghukom	Apr 5 to Apr 6	Calinog, Iloilo	
Kapiya Display and Pasyon Singing Contest	Apr 5 to Apr 6	Santa Barbara, Iloilo	
Semana Santa at Dariok Hills	Apr 5 to Apr 6	Santiago City	
Pak'kaat Kal'lo	Apr 5 to Apr 6	Magpet, Cotabato	
The Subok	Apr 5 to Apr 7	Taytay and Tanay, Rizal	
Semana Santa at Silay City	Apr 5 to Apr 8	Silay City	
Flagellants & Lenten Rites	Apr 5 to Apr 8	Paombong, Bulacan	
Giwang-giwang	Apr 6 (Good Friday)	Binangonan, Rizal	
Angeles Lenten Rites	Apr 6 (Good Friday)	Angeles City	
Lang-ay Festival	Apr 6 to Apr 8	Bontoc, Mountain Province	
San Pedro Cutud Lenten Rites	Apr 6, (Holy Week)	San Fernando City, Pampanga	
Lenten Week/ "Pagpapako"	Apr 6	Baler and Casiguran, Aurora	
Pamalandong ha Palo	Apr 6	Palo, Leyte	
Kalbaryo	Apr 6	La Carlota City	
Ang Hatol (the Way of the Cross)	Apr 6	Cainta, Rizal	
Prusisyon	Apr 6	Angeles City, Mabalacat, San Fernando, Sasmuan and Betis, Pampanga	
Baliuag Lenten Procession	Apr 6	Baliuag, Bulacan	
Folk Healing	Apr 7 (Black Saturday)	San Antonio, Siquijor	
Salubong (Angono, Rizal)	Apr 7 to Apr 8	Angono, Rizal	
Pagay-pagay Festival	Apr 7 to Apr 8	Saguday, Quirino	
Allaw Ta Apo Sandawa	Apr 7	Kidapawan City	
Sugat Kabanhawan Festival	March to April,(Easter Sunday)	Minglanilla, Cebu	celebrates the meeting of the Risen Christ and the sorrowful Mother Mary (Sugat), and the resurrection of Jesus (Kabanhawan)
Sunduan ha Carigara	Apr 8	Carigara, Leyte	
Sugat	Apr 8	San Carlos City	
Salubong (Easter Vigil) and Pasko ng Pagkabuhay (Feast of the Resurrection)	Apr 8	Parañaque	
Haladaya Festival	Apr 8	Daanbantayan, Cebu	
Sigpawan Festival	Apr 8	Lemery, Batangas	showcase the culture and natural resources of Lemery
Malangsi Fishtival	Apr 8	Bayambang, Pangasinan	fish festival
Dupax del Sur Town Fiesta	Apr 9 to Apr 11	Dupax Del Sur, Nueva Vizcaya	
Rodeo Masbateño	Apr 9 to Apr 14	Masbate City	
Panaad sa Negros	Apr 9 to Apr 15, or (2nd or 3rd week)	Bacolod	fusion of fiestas of 13 cities and 19 towns of the whole province of Negros Occidental
Araw ng Kagitingan	Apr 9	Mount Samat, Bataan	
Pandan Festival	Apr 11 to Apr 16	Mapandan, Pangasinan	
Aliwan Fiesta	Apr 12 to Apr 14	Pasay	
Bambang Town Fiesta: "Panggayjaya Festival"	Apr 13 to Apr 16	Bambang, Nueva Vizcaya	
Bantayog Festival	Apr 13 to Apr 16	Camarines Norte	
Ana Kalang Festival	Apr 13 to Apr 17	Nagcarlan, Laguna	honors the legendary Ana Kalang, the town's eponym
Easthfest Summer Festival	Apr 13 to 6 May	Tagum City	
Bancathon sa Magnaga	Apr 13	Pantukan, Davao de Oro	
Hugyaw sa Kadagatan	Apr 14	Kauswagan, Lanao del Norte	
Baybayon Festival	Apr 15 to Apr 17	Sagñay, Camarines Sur	
Tampisaw Festival (Earth Day Celebration)	Apr 16 to Apr 18	Concepcion, Iloilo	
Tungoh ad Hungduan	Apr 16 to Apr 19	Hungduan, Ifugao	
Garlic Festival	Apr 16 to Apr 20	Pinili, Ilocos Norte	
Ka-angkan	Apr 16 to Apr 22	Marikina	
Bangus Festival	Apr 17 to 4 May	Dagupan	celebrates the Bangus, the country's de facto national fish and chief product of the city
Binongey Festival	Apr 17	Anda, Pangasinan	
Linubian Festival	Apr 17 to Apr 19 (3rd week)	Rosario, La Union	showcases harvests of the municipality
Kasibu Town Fiesta	Apr 18 to Apr 19	Kasibu, Nueva Vizcaya	
Alfonso Castañeda Town Fiesta	Apr 18 to Apr 20	Alfonso Castañeda, Nueva Vizcaya	
Pasa-pasa Festival	Apr 18 to Apr 21	Monreal, Masbate	
Bugsayan Festival	Apr 19	Santa Fe, Romblon	Tablas Island
Tarlac City Charter Anniversary	Apr 19	Tarlac City, Tarlac	
Cocowayan Festival	Apr 20 to Apr 25	Isabela, Basilan	
Mango-bamboo Festival and Trade Fair	Apr 20 to Apr 27	San Carlos, Pangasinan	
"La Laguna" Festival	Apr 20 to Apr 29	Santa Cruz, Laguna	
Caromata Festival Town Fiesta	Apr 20	Laguindingan, Misamis Oriental	
Sunduan - Feast of Santa Rosa de Lima	Apr 21 (3rd Saturday)	Pasig	
Agoo Semana Santa	Apr 21 to Apr 22, or (Holy Week)	Agoo, La Union	
Panaad	Apr 21 to Apr 22, (Holy Week)	Camiguin	devotees trek to Vulkan Peak as an act of penance
Senakulo (Way of the Cross)	Apr 21 to Apr 22	Parañaque	
Gotad ad Hingyon	Apr 21 to Apr 24	Hingyon, Ifugao	
Sanduguan Festival	Apr 21 to Apr 27, or Nov 15	Calapan, Mindoro Oriental	reenacts the first contact between the natives of Mindoro and traders from China
Bangkarera	Apr 21	Peñablanca, Cagayan	boat-rowing race
Pabasa ng Pasyon	Apr 21	San Juan, Batangas	
Pagsalabuk Festival	Apr 22 to 19 May	Dipolog	
Hinugyaw sa Hinigaran Festival	Apr 22 to Apr 23	Hinigaran, Negros Occidental	
Kangayedan Festival	Apr 22 to Apr 26	Pagudpud, Ilocos Norte	
Subic 'ay Festival	Apr 22 to Apr 28	Subic, Zambales	
Gotad ad Kiangan	Apr 23 to Apr 25	Kiangan, Ifugao	
Pista sa Kinaiyahan	Apr 23 to Apr 26	Santa Cruz, Davao del Sur	
Pinakbet Festival	Apr 23	Santa Maria, Ilocos Sur	
Pista'y Dayat	Apr 24 to 1 May	Lingayen,Pangasinan	fishermen's harvest and thanksgiving festival
Sibit Sibit Festival	Apr 24 to Apr 30 (last week)	Olongapo City	
Yagyag Festival	Apr 24 to Apr 30	Sibulan, Negros Oriental	
Karosahan Festival	Apr 24	Nueva Valencia, Guimaras	
Araw ng Sulop	Apr 24	Sulop, Davao del Sur	
Talabukon Festival	Apr 25	Looc, Romblon	Tablas Island
Panagsangal Festival	Apr 25 to 1 May	Baggao, Cagayan	
Sinabalu Festival	Apr 25 to Apr 26	Rizal, Cagayan	
The Sabutan Festival and Mini-trade Fair	Apr 25 to Apr 29	Mabitac, Oriental Mindoro	
Imbayah Festtival	Apr 25 to Apr 29	Banaue, Ifugao	
Baggak Summer Festival	Apr 25 to Apr 30	Bauang, La Union	
Pasalamat Festival	Apr 25, or 1 May	La Carlota City	labor and thanksgiving festival
Aklan Day Celebration	Apr 25	Aklan	
Panagat "Fish" Tival	Apr 25	Estancia, Iloilo	
Bahag-hari Festival	Apr 25	Pinamalayan, Oriental Mindoro	
Balingoan Festival	Apr 25	Balingoan, Misamis Oriental	
Liliw Gat Tayaw Tsinelas Festival	Apr 26 to 1 May	Liliw, Laguna	honors legendary Gat Tayaw, chieftain. celebrates the local slipper economy.
Kutsitsa Festival	Apr 26	Molave, Zamboanga del Sur	
May Ilaoud Festival	Apr 27 to 1 May	Milaor, Camarines Sur	
Binirayan Festival	Apr 27 to Apr 29	San Jose de Buenavista and Hamtic, Antique	
Saknungan Festival	Apr 27 to Apr 30	San Jose, Occidental Mindoro	
Kadaugan sa Mactan	Apr 27	Cebu City, Cebu	reenactment of the Battle of Mactan
Dikit Festival	Apr 28 to Apr 30	Aurora, Isabela	
Butanding Festival	Apr 28 to 5 May	Donsol, Sorsogon	
Indak Padurukan Festival	Apr 28	San Jose, Occidental Mindoro	
Pandawan Festival	Apr 28	Pantabangan, Nueva Ecija	
Tinapahan Festival	Apr 29 to 1 May	Lemery, Batangas	
Dinaklisan Festival	Apr 29 to 1 May	Currimao, Ilocos Norte	
Antipolo Pilgrimage	Apr 30 to 1 May	Antipolo, Rizal	Annual pilgrimage season to visit the Nuestra Señora de la Paz y Buen Viaje
Mungo Festival	Apr 30 to 2 May	San Mateo, Isabela	
Kalipayan Festival	Apr 30	San Agustin, Romblon	
Bambang Patronal Town Fiesta: Saint Catherine of Sienna	Apr 30	Bambang, Nueva Vizcaya	

=== May ===
Name	Date range	Location	Notes (commemoration/main attraction(s)
Araquio Festival	May	General Tinio, Nueva Ecija	
Higawa Festival	May 1	Barracks, Caloocan	
Martipak Festival	May 1	Calumpit, Bulacan	Honors St. Joseph
Binallay Festival	May	Ilagan City, Isabela	Celebrates Binallay, a type of rice cake
Viva Vigan (Binatbatan) Festival of the Arts	1 May to 7 May (1st week)	Vigan City	
Sagalahang Bayan	May (1st week)	Navotas	
Pastulan Festival	May (2nd Saturday)	San Pascual, Batangas	
Pasayahan sa Lucena	May (4th week)	Lucena City	
Samahang Bulaklakan Festival	May (last Sunday)	Siniloan, Laguna	
Bangkero Festival	May (last Sunday), or March	Pagsanjan, Laguna	decorated boats (bancas)
Tapusan Float Parade Festival	May (month long) or 31 May	Alitagtag, Batangas	honors the Holy Cross
Calauan "Pinya" Festival	May (11–15)	Calauan, Laguna	Celebrates the pineapple, main crop of Calauan
Mamang-os Festival	May (no definite date)	Tuy, Batangas	
Flores de Mayo (Santacruzan)	May (whole month)	nationwide	commemoration of the search for the Holy Cross by Reyna Elena and her son, the emperor Constantine
Davao Gulf Regatta	1 May to 4 May	Davao Oriental	
Araquio of Peñaranda	1 May and 8 May (1st & 2nd Sunday)	Penaranda, Nueva Ecija	
Pangisraan Festival	1 May to 10 May	Calatrava, Romblon	
Abaca Festival	May	Catanduanes	
Pahinungod Festival	1 May to 10 May	Calape, Bohol	
Gericho Laran Plantsa-Plantsa Festival	1 May to Apr 30	Laoag City	
Bicol Loco Festival	3 May to 5 May	Legazpi City	Hot air balloons
Flores de Tagumeño Festival	1 May to 30 May	Tagum City	
Balangay Festival (Balanghai)	1 May to 31 May	Butuan	commemorates the coming of the early migrants from Borneo and Celebes
Balik-butuan	1 May to 31 May	Butuan	
Pattaraday Festival (Araw ng Santiago)	1 May to 5 May	Santiago City	
Pasinggatan Festival	1 May to 5 May	Taytay, Palawan	
Tikanlu Festival	1 May to 6 May	Tagudin, Ilocos Sur	
100 Islands Festival	1 May to 7 May	Alaminos, Pangasinan	
Madahom Festival	1 May to 8 May	Caramoan, Camarines Sur	
Magayon Festival	May month long	Albay	Albay's culture, Mayon Volcano
Boa-boahan "Alinsangan" Festival	1 May, or 2 May	Nabua, Camarines Sur	re-enactment of the 13th-century rite of offering chains of coconut embryos ("boa") to deities
Sumakah Festival	1 May	Antipolo, Rizal	
Pista ng Produktong Pilipino	1 May	Subic, Olongapo City	
Tromba Festival	1 May	Baras, Rizal	
Sagalahan	1 May	Malabon	
Dinengdeng Festival & Town Fiesta	1 May	Agoo, La Union	
Pastores Festival	1 May	Gapan	
Salay Town Fiesta	1 May	Salay, Misamis Oriental	Saint Joseph the Worker
Saint Joseph the Worker Fiesta	1 May	Montevista, Davao de Oro	
Duyog Panday	1 May	Cotabato City	
Dayaw Dalan Festival	2 May to 3 May	Ticao Island, San Jacinto, Masbate	
Panagat Festival	2 May to 8 May	Buruanga, Aklan	
Salubong (Holy Cross Festival)	2 May	Alitagtag and Bauan, Batangas	
Sublian Festival	2 May	Bauan, Batangas	
Luyang Dilaw Festival	2 May	Marilao, Bulacan	
Katagman Festival	3 May, (first week)	Oton, Iloilo	highlights the historical significance of the golden mask dugout to the community
Domorokdok Festival (Dumarokdok)	3 May to 4 May	Botolan, Zambales	
Rit-ritemong Cayong Festival	3 May to 5 May	Sarrat, Ilocos Norte	
Virgen Milagrosa Festival	May	Ilocos Norte	Honors the provincial patron of Ilocos Norte, La Virgen Milagrosa. Miss Ilocos Norte is also held in this Festival.
Carabao-Carozza Festival	3 May	Pavia, Iloilo	Iloilo's Oldest Festival, celebrated consistently since 1973 and the only Philippine festival celebrated even at the height of the COVID-19 pandemic. The objective of the festival is to give honor and a break for a day to the farmer's bestfriend - the Carabao. The festival has three components: Carabao-Carroza Parade, Carabao-Carroza Race and the Festival Queen Search
Bawang Festival	3 May	Sinait, Ilocos Sur	garlic
Feast of the Holy Cross	3 May	Santa Cruz, Marinduque	
Alubijid Town Fiesta	3 May	Alubijid, Misamis Oriental	
Santa Cruz Parochial Fiesta	3 May	Samal, Davao del Norte	
Pamuhuan Festival	4 May	Pinamungajan, Cebu	
Dawa Festival	5 May to 10 May	Gonzaga, Cagayan	
Bacoor Marching Band Festival	6 May to 8 May	Bacoor, Cavite	
Sas-alliwa Festival	7 May to 15 May	Natonin, Mountain Province	
Feast day of Saint Michael	7 May to 8 May	San Miguel, Catanduanes	honors St. Michael the Archangel
Labig Festival	7 May to 9 May	Claveria, Cagayan	
Mantawi Festival	7 May	Mandaue City	
Basi Festival	7 May	Naguilian, La Union	celebrates the Basi
Jose Abad Santos Day	7 May	San Fernando, Pampanga	commemorates Jose Abad Santos
Balsa Festival	8 May (2nd Saturday)	Lian, Batangas	
Summer Sports Festival	8 May to 14 May (2nd week)	Tagum City	
Agawan sa Sariaya (San Isidro Festival)	8 May to 16 May	Sariaya, Quezon	Honors San Isidro Labrador
Mayohan sa Tayabas (San Isidro Festival)	8 May to 16 May	Tayabas, Quezon	Honors San Isidro Labrador
De Galera Festival	9 May to 12 May	Puerto Galera, Oriental Mindoro	
Mayaw-mayaw Festival	10 May	Pinabacdao, Samar	in honor of Our Lady of Sorrows
Aramang Festival	10 May to 11 May	Aparri, Cagayan	
Kayapa Town Fiesta	10 May to 12 May	Kayapa, Nueva Vizcaya	
Kasadyawan Festival	10 May to 15 May	Magdiwang, Romblon	Sibuyan Island
Makalawan "Pinya" Festival	10 May to 15 May	Calauan, Laguna	
Feast of Our Lady of Biglang Awa	10 May	Boac, Marinduque	honors the Mahal na Birhan ng Biglang-Awa of Boac
Saging Festival	10 May	Lazi, Siquijor	
Palong Festival	11 May to 13 May	Capalonga, Camarines Norte	
Balwarte sa Gumaca	11 May to 15 May	Gumaca, Quezon	
Paukyaban Festival	11 May to 30 May	Butuan	
Barangay Boat Festival	11 May	Aparri, Cagayan	Fluvial festival held in honor of Saint Peter Thelmo
Villaverde Town Fiesta	12 May to 14 May	Villaverde, Nueva Vizcaya	
Mano Po San Roque Festival	12 May	Valenzuela City	
Bariw Festival	14 May to 15 May	Nabas, Aklan	showcasing bags, mats and hats made of bariw leaves
Malaybalay City Fiesta	14 May to 15 May	Malaybalay City	honors San Isidro Labrador
Feast of San Isidro Labrador/Carabao Festival	14 May to 15 May	Angono, Rizal	honors San Isidro Labrador
Arana't Balwarte sa Gumaca (San Isidro Festival)	14 May to 15 May	Gumaca, Quezon	honors San Isidro Labrador
Medina Town Fiesta	14 May to 15 May	Medina, Misamis Oriental	honors San Isidro Labrador
Pahiyas Festival	14 May to 15 May	Lucban and Sariaya, Quezon	honors San Isidro Labrador Famous for its colorful rice decorations known as Kiping
Pulilan Carabao Festival	14 May to 15 May	Pulilan, Bulacan	honors San Isidro Labrador
Balbagan Festival	14 May to 15 May	Binalbagan	Honors San Isidro and the Slithering Snake
Fiesta Bicolandia Cruise "Peñafrancia Pilgrimage"	14 May to 18 May	Cebu City	commemorates the Our Lady of Peñafrancia
Sarakat Festival	14 May	Santa Praxedes, Cagayan	
Araña`t Baluarte Festival	15 May	Gumaca, Quezon	
Aringay Festival	15 May to 21 May	Lasam, Cagayan	
Manggahan Festival	15 May to 22 May, or Apr 15 to Apr 22	Guimaras	founding of province and its mangoes
Sunduan	15 May	Parañaque	
San Isidro Festival (Pandanan)	15 May	Luisiana, Laguna	Honors San Isidro Labrador
P'gsalabuk Festival	15 May	Dipolog	Feast in honor of Saint Vincent Ferrer
Onggoyan Festival	15 May	Malimono, Surigao del Norte	
Sinagingan Festival	15 May	Mendez, Cavite	
Panalaminan Festival	15 May	Roxas, Palawan	
Kagasangan Festival	15 May	Moalboal, Cebu	A Cebuano word which translates to "coral reefs". The festival is celebrated for the abundance marine life. It is held in honor of San Juan Nepumoceno (St. John of Nepomuk).
San Isidro Fiesta	15 May	Digos	honors San Isidro Labrador
Tinapay Festival	15 May	Cuenca, Batangas	
Maubanog Festival	16 May to 17 May	Mauban, Quezon	
Harana Festival (Karantahan nin Pagranga)	16 May to 21 May, or Feb 14	San Jose, Camarines Sur	
Pahoy-Pahoy Festival	16 May to 24 May, or 19 May to 25 May	Calbiga, Samar	Celebrates the pahoy-pahoy (scarecrows)
Iikalahan/Kalanguya Festival	16 May	San Nicolas, Pangasinan	
Gakit Festival	16 May	Angadanan, Isabela	
Lapyahan Festival	16 May	San Remigio, Cebu	
Obando Fertility Rites	17 May to 19 May	Obando, Bulacan	Honors the town patrons San Pascual Baylon, Santa Clara de Assisi and the Virgen de Salambao
Sanggutan Festival	18 May	Barugo, Leyte	
Magdadaran Talip Festival	19 May to 20 May	Carasi, Dumalneg, Nueva Era, Adams, Ilocos Norte	
Sarangani Bay Festival	19 May to 21 May	Glan, Sarangani	
Ammungan Festival	19 May to 24 May	Nueva Vizcaya	Gathering of ethnic tribes and lowland inhabitants of the province
Sarung Banggi Festival	19 May to 27 May	Santo Domingo, Albay	
Farmers Festival	19 May	Bacarra, Ilocos Norte	
Araw ng Sarangani	19 May	Sarangani	
Banwahon Festival	20 May	Surigao City	
Malabon Foundation Day	21 May	Malabon	Commemorates the founding of Malabon
Lubi Festival	21 May	Maria, Siquijor	
Layag Festival	22 May to 27 May	Rapu-Rapu, Albay	
Kabasan Festival	22 May to 28 May	Davao de Oro	
Lubi-lubi (Coconut) Festival	22 May	Gingoog	
Feast of Saint Rita de Cascia (City Fiesta)	22 May	Gingoog	honors St. Rita of Cascia
Tabanog Festival Araw ng Balingasag	22 May	Balingasag, Misamis Oriental	
Panagyaman Festival	23 May to 25 May, or 19 May to 24 May	Bayombong, Nueva Vizcaya	establishment of civil government in the province
Bolibong Kingking Festival	24 May to 25 May	Loboc, Bohol	music and dance festival of folklore and traditions
Kaogma Festival	24 May to 31 May	Pili, Camarines Sur	
Guihulugan Festival	24 May	Guihulngan, Negros Oriental	
Katang Festival	25 May	Calauag, Quezon	
Gabii sa Kabilin	25 May	Cebu City	
Sinugboan Festival	27 May	Garcia Hernandez, Bohol	
Binuyugan Festival	27 May	Maitum, Sarangani	
Pintos Festival	27 May	Bogo, Cebu	
Kalayaan Festival	28 May to Jun 12	Cavite (provincewide)	
Wagayway Festival	28 May	Imus, Cavite	
Province of Tarlac Founding Anniversary	28 May	Tarlac City	Commemoration of the founding of Tarlac
National Flag Day	28 May	Iligan City	
Dapugan Festival	28 May	Mabini, Davao de Oro	
Sagawak Festival	28 May	Malalag	
Rosquillos Festival	29 May	Liloan, Cebu	
Balingoan Town Fiesta	29 May	Balingoan, Misamis Oriental	
Mammangi Festival	30 May, (last week)	Ilagan City	thanksgiving and harvest festival, honors the farmers
Bagasbas Beach International Eco-arts Festival	30 May to Jun 6	Daet, Camarines Norte	
Hudyaka Festival	30 May to Jun 9	Zamboanga del Norte	
Padaraw Festival	30 May	Bulan, Sorsogon	
Halamang Dilaw Festival	May	Marilao, Bulacan	pays tribute to nature

=== June ===
Name	Date range	Location	Notes (commemoration/main attraction(s)
Rizal Arts Festival	Jun 1 to Jun 30	Angono, Rizal	Commemorates Angono's status as the Art capital of the Philippines
Buklog	Jun 1 to Jun 6	Dipolog	
Linggo ng Zamboanga del Norte & "Sardines and Mango Festival"	Jun 1 to Jun 6	Dipolog	
Sinukmani Festival	Jun 9	Rosario, Batangas	Celebrates the sinukmani- a local rice cake
Bilang-bilang Abayan Festival	Jun 1	Surigao City	
Sakay-sakay Abayan	Jun 1	Surigao City	fluvial procession
Pulang-Angui Festival	Jun 4	Polangui, Albay	relives the origin of the town
Carrera Habagat	Jun 8 to Jun 12	Siargao Island, Surigao del Norte	
Camotes Cassava Festival	Jun 8 to Jun 14	Tudela, Cebu (Camotes Island)	
Baragatan sa Palawan (Foundation Day)	Jun 10 to Jun 23	Puerto Princesa City	Founding anniversary of the civil government of Palawan
Lechonan sa Baroy	Jun 10	Baroy, Lanao del Norte	
Kuron Festival	Jun 11	Ferrol, Romblon	Tablas Island. Fiesta starts June 11 and ends June 13 (San Antonio de Padua)
Pagdayao Festival	Jun 11 to Jun 12	Tacloban, Leyte, Masbate	thanksgiving feast
Rizal Province Foundation Day	Jun 11	Rizal (no definite venue)	Commemorates the founding of Rizal Province
Araw ng Agusan del Sur	Jun 12	Agusan del Sur	
Sugok-Sugok Festival	Jun 12 to Jun 13	Bagamanoc, Catanduanes	
Panagsasalug Fiesta	Jun 12 to Jun 15	Maddela, Quirino	
La Trinidad Foundation Day	Jun 12 to Jun 16	La Trinidad, Benguet	
Araw ng Agusan del Norte	Jun 12 to Jun 17	Agusan del Norte	
Naliyagan Festival	Jun 12 to Jun 17	Prosperidad, Agusan del Sur	
Araw ng Quezon	Jun 12 to Jun 18	Quezon, Bukidnon	
Araw ng Cotabato	Jun 12 to Jun 20	Cotabato City	founding anniversary festival
Independence Day	Jun 12	nationwide	Commemorates the Philippine Declaration of Independence
Bonsai Festival and Founding Anniversary of San Isidro	Jun 12	San Isidro, Davao	
Pangapog Festival	Jun 13 to Jun 18	Samal, Davao del Norte	
Dorong Festival	Jun 14 to Jun 19	Digos	
Gotad ad Ifugao	Jun 14 to Jun 28	Lagawe, Ifugao	
Battle of Besang Pass Commemoration	Jun 14	Cervantes, Ilocos Sur	Commemoration of the Battle of Bessang Pass
Victory at Bacsil Ridge	Jun 14	San Fernando City, La Union	
Pinyasan (Pineapple) Festival	Jun 15 to Jun 23	Camarines Norte	
Cagayan de Oro City Charter Day	Jun 15	Cagayan de Oro	
Iligan City Charter Day	Jun 16	Iligan City	
Damsu Cultural Festival	Jun 16	Kiblawan	
Baykat Festival, Ambaguio Town Fiesta	Jun 17 to Jun 19	Ambaguio, Nueva Vizcaya	
Quezon Town Fiesta	Jun 17 to Jun 20	Quezon, Nueva Vizcaya	
Regada Festival	Jun 17 to Jun 24	Cavite City	Honors Saint John the Baptist
San Juan Cityhood Anniversary	Jun 17	San Juan City	Commemorates the founding of San Juan City
Tagnipan-on Festival	Jun 17	El Salvador, Misamis Oriental	
Kaimonan Festival	Jun 17	Maco, Davao de Oro	
White Nights Festival	Jun 18 to Jun 19 (every 3rd weekend)	Davao del Norte	
Pabulig Festival	Jun 18 to Jun 19	Boston, Davao Oriental	
Lingganay Festival	Jun 18	Alangalang, Leyte	
Araw ng San Fernando Bukidnon	Jun 18	San Fernando, Bukidnon	
Cadang–Cadang Festival	Jun 18	Carmen, Davao del Norte	
Dapitan's Charter	Jun 19 to Jun 22	Dapitan	
Pujada Bay Festival	Jun 19 to Jul 24	Mati, Davao Oriental	
Adlaw Nan Surigao	Jun 19	Surigao del Norte and Surigao del Sur	
Buhayani Festival	Jun 19	Calamba, Laguna	
Pista ng Kalikasan	Jun 19	Palawan (provincewide)	
Saint Peter Town Fiesta	Jun 19	Sugbongcogon, Misamis Oriental	
Ginnamuluan Fiesta	Jun 20 to Jun 21	Cabarroguis, Quirino	
Pista Y Ang Kagueban	Jun 20 to Jun 27 (3rd week)	Puerto Princesa City	
"Oyange Kaugman" Festival	Jun 20 to Jun 29	Polangui, Albay	
Pili Festival	Jun 20 to Jun 29	Sorsogon, Sorsogon	Celebrates the pili, the local product
Zambulawan Festival	Jun 20	Pagadian City, Zamboanga del Sur	street pageantry
Balyuan Rites	Jun 20	Tacloban City	
Mudpack Festival	Jun 21 to Jun 22, or Jun 24	Murcia, Negros Occidental	
Payuhwan Festival: Batanes Day	Jun 21 to Jun 26	Batanes	
Diwata Festival	Jun 21	San Francisco, Agusan del Sur	
Pagadian City Charter Day	Jun 21	Pagadian City	
Piat Sambali Festival	Jun 23 to Jul 2, or (last week)	Piat, Cagayan	Commemorates the Christianization of the Ytawes region of Cagayan
Aggaw Nak Cagayan (Cagayan Founding Anniversary)	Jun 23 to Jun 30	Cagayan	
Calumpit "Libad" Festival	Jun 23	Calumpit, Bulacan	
Batac Charter Day & Empanada Festival	Jun 23	Batac, Ilocos Norte	
Matagoan Festival	Jun 24 to Jun 26	Tabuk City, Kalinga	
Parada ng Lechon (Parade of Roast Pigs)	Jun 24	Balayan, Batangas	honors St. John the Baptist.
Hibok-Hibok Festival	Jun 24	Camiguin Island	honors St. John the Baptist.
Kaliguan Fluvial Festival	Jun 24	Cagwait, Surigao del Sur	
Feast of San Antonio de Padua	Jun 24	Pila, Laguna	honors St. Anthony de Padua
Feast of Saint John the Baptist / Lechon Festival	Jun 24	Mindoro Oriental	honors St. John the Baptist.
Araw ng Maynila	Jun 24	Manila City	Commemorates the proclamation of Manila as the capital of the Spanish colonial administration in the Philippines.
Taong-putik Festival	Jun 24	Aliaga, Nueva Ecija	honors St. John the Baptist. Devotees dress up in banana leaves and mud as is tradition.
Wattah Wattah Festival	Jun 24	San Juan City	honors St. John the Baptist. Noted practice is the "basaan".
Sab'uyan Festival / Feast of Saint John the Baptist	Jun 24	Pola, Oriental Mindoro	honors St. John the Baptist.
Lubid–Lubid Festival and Cow Parade	Jun 24	Tiaong, Quezon	
San Juan sa Hibok-hibok Festival	Jun 24	Camiguin (provincewide)	honors St. John the Baptist.
Feast of Saint John the Baptist	Jun 25	San Juan, Metro Manila	honors St. John the Baptist.
Ikid-ikid sa Hononganan Festival	Jun 25	Hinunangan, Southern Leyte	
Bituon Han Leyte Kasadyaan	Jun 25	Tacloban City	
Palo Palo Festival	Jun 26	Batanes	
Apung Iru (Saint Peter Fluvial Festival)	Jun 27 to Jun 29	Apalit, Pampanga	in honor of Saint Peter or "Apung Iru"
Sakay-sakay Festival	Jun 27 to Jun 29	Jimenez, Misamis Occidental	
Pintados Festival	Jun 27, or Jun 29	Tacloban, Leyte	Celebration based on the ancient tattooed pintados warriors
Taephag Festival	Jun 27	Tagbina, Surigao del Sur	
Araw ng El Salvador	Jun 27	El Salvador, Misamis Oriental	
Araw ng Maramag	Jun 27	Maramag, Bukidnon	
Cacabyawan Festival	Jun 27	San Isidro, Davao del Norte	
Saint Peter and Paul Feast	June 28–29	Ormoc City, Leyte	Honors Sts. Peter and Paul
Feast of Saints Peter and Paul	Jun 28 to Jun 29	Cagdianao, Surigao del Norte	Honors Sts. Peter and Paul
Kalilang sa Ranao	Jun 28 to Jul 5, or Apr 10 to Apr 15	Marawi City, Lanao del Sur	charter anniversary celebration of Marawi City
Subiran Regatta	Jun 28	Tacloban City	
Kaniyog'n Festival	Jun 28	Brooke's Point, Palawan	
Bailes de Arcos	Jun 29	Makati	
Biniray Festival	Jun 29	Bulalacao, Oriental Mindoro	
Sugbongcogontown Fiesta / Sacred Heart of Jesus	Jun 29	Sugbongcogon, Misamis Oriental	
Sangyaw Festival of Lights Street Dance (Parade of Lights) and Ritual Dance Competition	Jun 29	Tacloban City	
Feast of Patron Saint of Tacloban, the Sr. Sto. Niño De Tacloban El Capitan	June 30	Tacloban City	honors the Sto Niño
Kahalawan te Sebseb "Spring Festival"	Jun 30	Maramag, Bukidnon	
Naligayan Festival	June (2nd week)	Agusan del Norte	features sociocultural shows and fairs involving indigenous groups
Daet Pineapple Festival	June (3rd week), (15–24)	Daet, Camarines Norte	celebrates the Pineapple, Daet's main crop
Feast of Apung Iru (St.Peter the Apostle)	June 28, 29, 30	Apalit, Pampanga	Fluvial Procession of the Image of St. Peter from Spain. Celebrated since 1844.
Hugaw Silay Festival	June 12	Silay City, Negros Occidental	Honors the legendary Princess Kansilay
Lumalay Festival	June 18	Tampakan, South Cotabato	

=== July ===
Name	Date range	Location	Notes (commemoration/main attraction(s)
Simbalay	July	Nabunturan, Davao de Oro	
Bocaue River Festival	July (1st Sunday)	Bocaue, Bulacan	Honors Krus ng Wawa or Cross of Bocaue
Sagayan Festival	July (1st week), Jul 4	Tubod, Lanao del Norte	festival with a Maranao war dance as a main event
Sandugo Festival	July (last week), or (month-long)	Tagbilaran City, Bohol	Commemorates the blood compact between local chieftain Datu Sikatuna and Captain General Miguel Lopez de Legazpi
Kahimoan Abayan Festival	July (last week)	Butuan	Honors Santa Ana
Syensaya Los Baños Science Festival	July (no definite date yet)	Los Baños, Laguna	Highlights the products, technologies and innovations of the science-related agencies in Los Baños
Kalakal Festival	July (no definite date yet)	Santa Maria, Laguna	
Sublian sa Batangas	July to Jul 23	Batangas City	foundation day of Batangas City, revives the subli dance tradition
Banana Festival	Jul 1 to Jul 10	Tagum, Davao del Norte	
Feast of Our Lady of Guibang	Jul 1 to Jul 2	Gamu, Isabela	
Festival of Our Lady of Piat	Jul 1 to Jul 2	Piat, Cagayan	Honors the Our Lady of Piat
Gatas ng Kalabaw Festival	Jul 1 to Jul 7	Cabanatuan	Celebrates Carabao milk
San Carlos Charter Anniversary	Jul 1	San Carlos, Negros Occidental	
Araw ng Davao del Sur, Davao del Norte, Davao Oriental	Jul 1	Digos, Tagum City, Mati City	
Sinugdan Festival	Jul 1	Maasin City, Southern Leyte	
Tanggogoan Festival	Jul 1	Digos	
Kadagayaan Festival	Jul 1 (week-long)	Davao del Norte	Celebrates and promotes the agri-aqua industry of the province
Araw ng Pasig	Jul 2	Pasig	
Banig Festival	Jul 3	Badian, Cebu	
Feast of the Holy Cross of Wawa (Pagoda Festival)	Jul 4 to Jul 7, or Jul 3 (1st Sunday)	Bocaue, Bulacan	Honors of the Holy Cross of Wawa
Kahumayan Festival	Jul 5 to Jul 8	Kapatagan, Lanao del Norte	
Araw ng Hagonoy	Jul 5	Hagonoy, Davao del Sur	
Alegria de Isabela	Jul 8	Isabela, Basilan	
Lubid Festival	Jul 12 to Jul 16	Malilipot, Albay	
Hudyaka Festival	Jul 12	Laguindingan, Misamis Oriental	
T’nalak Festival	Jul 13 to Jul 18	Koronadal City	Harvest celebration named after the T'nalak, a local textile and weaving tradition
Sinarapan Festival	Jul 14 to Jul 15	Buhi, Camarines Sur	Commemorates the Sinarapan
Perangat Ozamiz Festival	Jul 15 to Jul 16	Ozamiz City, Misamis Occidental	Formerly known as the Subayan Keg Subanen Festival; commemorates the Subanon people
Cordillera Day	Jul 15 to Jul 30	Baguio / CAR provinces	
S'lang Festival	Jul 15	Malungon, Sarangani	
Pahinungod Festival	Jul 16	Carrascal, Surigao del Sur	
Binuhat Festival	Jul 17 to Jul 23	Tagum City	
Kinis Festival	Jul 18 to Jul 25	Panganiban, Catanduanes	crab festival
Padigosan Festival	Jul 19	Digos	
Busaingan Festival	Jul 22	Santa Magdalena, Sorsogon	
Libon Paroy Festival	Jul 22 to Jul 25	Libon, Albay	
Kaliga Festival	Jul 22	Gingoog	
Birth Anniversary of Apolinario Mabini	Jul 22	Tanauan, Batangas, Batangas City	Commemorates Apolinario Mabini
Ibid Festival	Jul 23	Caibiran, Biliran	
Araw ng Nabunturan	Jul 23	Nabunturan, Davao de Oro	
Kinabayo Festival (Battle of Covadonga)	Jul 24 to Jul 25	Dapitan	re-enacting the Spanish-Moorish wars, and/or in honor of Saint James
Sinulog de Tanjay Festival	Jul 24, (last week)	Tanjay, Negros Oriental	features the origin of the old sinulog culture
Buganihan Festival	Jul 25 to Aug 1	Davao de Oro	
Balikcarcanmadcarlan Celebration	Jul 25 to Jul 31	Cantilan, Surigao del Sur	
Kadagatan Festival	Jul 25	Cortes, Surigao del Sur	
Panagsogod Festival	Jul 25	Sogod, Cebu	
Kutoo Festival	Jul 25	Cateel, Davao Oriental	
Saint James the Apostle Fiesta	Jul 25	Davao de Oro	Honors St. James the Apostle
Tourism Consciousness Week	Jul 26 to Aug 2	Butuan	
Pakapya-Agtike	Jul 26	Socorro, Oriental Mindoro	
Santa Anang Banak Taguig River Festival	Jul 26	Taguig	Honors St. Anne
Kaumahan Festival	Jul 26	Barili, Cebu	
Palaisdaan Festival	July 26	Hagonoy, Bulacan	Honors St. Anne, Foundation Day of the Town
Anniversary of Battle of Paye	Jul 30	Marinduque	Commemorates the Battle of Paye
Abayan Festival	Jul 31	Butuan	
San Ignacio de Loyola Fiesta	Jul 31	Monkayo, Davao de Oro	Honors St. Ignatius of Loyola
Salagaan Festival	Jul 26 to Jul 30	Kalamansig, Sultan Kudarat	

=== August ===
Name	Date range	Location	Notes (commemoration/main attraction(s)
Ibalong Festival	August (2nd week), (10–19)	Legazpi City	Celebrates the epic story Ibalong who was accompanied by three legendary heroes, namely Baltog, Handyong, and Bantong.-
Raja Baguinda Festival	August (2nd week)	Jolo, Sulu	Commemorates the arrival of Raja Baguinda who is credited of spreading the Islam faith to the Sultanate of Sulu
Aurora Festival	August (last Sunday of Aug. to 1st week of Sept.)	Tanjay, Negros Oriental	Features evening novenas which culminate in a nocturnal fluvial procession at the Tanjay River
Guiling–Guiling Festival	August (no definite date yet)	Siniloan, Laguna	
Pasigarbo sa Sugbo Festival of Festivals	August (Around the Cebuano Charter Day)	Province of Cebu	A festival of all Cebuano Festivals which is a celebration of Cebu as one province, as well as a major tourism endeavor to promote the entire province and islands.
Buwan ng Wika	August	Batangas City Nationwide	Celebrates the proclamation of Filipino as National Language
Durian Festival	August to September	Tagum City	Celebrates the Durian, a major product of the city
Sal-lupongan Festival	Aug 1 to Aug 10	New Bataan, Davao de Oro	
City of Valencia Festival	Aug 1 to Aug 28	Valencia, Bukidnon	
Cabibi Festival	Aug 1 to Aug 4	Lal-lo, Cagayan	
Padagyaw Festival	Aug 1 to Aug 5	Dumarao, Capiz	
Pangapog Festival	Aug 1 to Aug 7	Island Garden City of Samal	Highlights the culture of the Samal
Almasiga Festival	Aug 1	Governor Generoso, Davao Oriental	
Udyakan sa Kabankalan/Charter Anniversary	Aug 2	Kabankalan City, Negros Occidental	
Adlaw Hong Butuan	Aug 2	Butuan	
Palagsing Festival	Aug 2	Butuan	
Santa Clara Festival	Aug 4 to Aug 13	Tigaon, Camarines Sur	
Palu-Palo Festival	Aug 4 to Aug 5	Basco, Batanes	Highlights the culture of the Ivatans
Bayombong Town Fiesta	Aug 5 to Aug 9	Bayombong, Nueva Vizcaya	Honors Sto. Domingo de guzman
Marang Festival	Aug 5	Las Nieves, Agusan del Norte	Celebrates the Marang, a major crop of the town
El Salvador Fiesta	Aug 5	El Salvador, Misamis Oriental	
Feast of Our Lady of Snows	Aug 5	Himamaylan City, Negros Occidental	Honors the Our Lady of Snows
Pagpasidungog Festival	Aug 6 to Aug 10	Panitan, Capiz	
Mercedes Fishtival (Mercedes Kadagatan Festival)	Aug 6 to Aug 11	Mercedes, Camarines Norte	Thanksgiving festival by local fishermen
Nalupon Festival	Aug 8	Lupon, Davao Oriental	
Fruit Festival	Aug 9 to Aug 11	Kidapawan City	
Niyogyugan Festival	Aug 9 to Aug 19	Quezon Province	
Bonga Festival	Aug 9	Sibonga, Cebu	Honors St. Philomena and Our Lady of the Pillar, town patrons
Maliputo Festival	Aug 9	San Nicolas, Batangas	
Ajonay Festival	Aug 10	Maasin City	Mardi Gras-like festival depicting local culture
Cordova Dinagat Festival	Aug 10 to Aug 16	Cordova, Cebu	fishing rituals
Pav-vurulun Afi Festival	Aug 10 to Aug 17	Tuguegarao, Cagayan	
Araw ng Cabanglasan	Aug 11 to Aug 13	Cabanglasan, Bukidnon	
Kaadlawan Han Samar	Aug 11	Catbalogan, Samar	
Kaahaan Festival (Araw ng Kinoguitan)	Aug 11	Kinoguitan, Misamis Oriental	
Santones Festival	Aug 12 to Aug 16	Liliw, Laguna	
Arandurugan Festival	Aug 12 to Aug 17	Guinobatan, Albay	
Pangasinan Bamboo Festival	Aug 12	Calasiao and Santa Barbara, Pangasinan	Showcases the bamboo
Pasigarbo sa Sugbo	Aug 13 to (2nd Saturday)	Cebu City	
Paray Festival	Aug 13 to Aug 15	Viga, Catanduanes	Celebrates rice as major crop
Araw ng Tayabas	Aug 13	Tayabas, Quezon	
Kalubihan Festival	Aug 14 to Aug 20	Jordan, Guimaras	
Kalibongan Festival (Horse Fight & Blood Compact)	Aug 14, or Aug 17 to Aug 18	Kidapawan City, Cotabato	The gathering of Mindanao ethnolinguistic groups
Pasaka Festival	Aug 14	Tanauan, Leyte	Honors the Our Lady of Assumption
Caro-tao Festival	Aug 14	Mawab, Davao de Oro	
Coron Festival	Aug 15 to Aug 17	Tiwi, Albay	
Kaumahan Festival	Aug 15 to Aug 31	Opol, Misamis Oriental	
Feast of Our Lady of the Assumption	Aug 15	Boac, Marinduque	
Sirong Festival	Aug 15	Cantilan, Surigao del Sur	Named after the war dance between Muslims and Christians
Sumayajaw Festival	Aug 15	Jabonga, Agusan del Norte	
Lubi-Lubi (Coconut) Festival	Aug 15	Calubian, Leyte	Honors Our Lady of Fatima and Saint Roque
Kumbira	Aug 17 to Aug 19 or Aug 12 to Aug 14	Cagayan de Oro	Culinary food show and competition
Sundayag	Aug 18	Cagayan de Oro	
Lumin-awa Festival	Aug 18	Lubuagan, Kalinga	
Araw ng Alubijid (Diyandihan Festival)	Aug 18	Alubijid, Misamis Oriental	
Gigantes Festival	Aug 19	Lucban, Quezon	(giants)
Buyogan Festival	Aug 19 or Aug 29	Abuyog, Leyte	Celebrates Bees and beekeeping
Quezon Day/Angono Day	Aug 19	Angono, Rizal	
Coco Sabutan Festival	Aug 19	Baler, Aurora	
Manuel Luis Quezon Birth Anniversary	Aug 19	Quezon City	
Kadayawan sa Dabaw	Aug 20 to Aug 24, (3rd week)	Davao City	Thanksgiving festival and a tribute to its indigenous peoples
Bankaton	Aug 20	Lavezares, Northern Samar	Annual boat racing contest celebrating the feast of Nuestra Senora de Salvacion
Pilgrimage to Joroan	Aug 20	Tiwi, Albay	A Pilgrimage in honor of Our Lady of Salvation
Sabutan Festival	Aug 21 to Aug 25	San Luis, Aurora	
Anniversary of Cry of Pugadlawin	Aug 23	Quezon City	Commemorates the Cry of Pugad Lawin
Manaragat Festival	Aug 23	Catbalogan	
Pasa-pasa Ikaw Festival	Aug 25 to Aug 30	Pasacao, Camarines Sur	
Tsinelas Festival	Aug 25	Gapan, Nueva Ecija	
Iloilo City Charter Day	Aug 25	Iloilo City	
Kagayhaan Festival	Aug 26 to Aug 28	Cagayan de Oro	
Daragang Magayon Festival	Aug 26 to Sep 8	Daraga, Albay	Commemorates the legendary Daragang Magayon of Bikolano folklore
Alcala Town Fiesta	Aug 26	Alcala, Cagayan	
Higa-onon Dance Festival	Aug 26	Cagayan de Oro	
Madyaw, Hugyaw Samal Festival	Aug 27 to Aug 28 (every last weekend)	Davao del Norte	
Jinawa Festival	Aug 27 to Aug 28	Gigaquit, Surigao del Norte	
Bahandi Festival	Aug 27	Alcantara, Cebu	
Cagayan de Oro Golden Float Festival	Aug 27	Cagayan de Oro	
Native "Manok" Festival	Aug 27	Panabo City	
Hudyaka sa Panglao	Aug 28	Municipality of Panglao, Bohol	
Lambagohan Festival	Aug 28	Cagayan de Oro	
Paladong Festival	Aug 28	Hinatuan, Surigao del Sur	
Kalumunan Festival	Aug 28	San Agustin, Surigao del Sur	
Kagay-an Festival	Aug 28	Cagayan de Oro	
Kariyawan Festival	Aug 28 to Sep 4	Monkayo, Davao de Oro	
Tilaw sa Pagkaong Nan Surigaonon Food Festival	Aug 29 to Aug 31	Surigao City	
National Heroes Day	Last Monday of August	Nationwide	Commemorates all Filipino heroes
Nagsabado Festival	Aug 29	Pasig	
Local Heroes Day Celebration	Aug 29	Pateros	
Siloy Festival	Aug 30	Alcoy, Cebu	
Mandaue Charter Day Celebration	Aug 30	Mandaue, Cebu	
Turumba	Aug 30	Teresa, Rizal	
Battle of Pinaglabanan Commemoration	Aug 30	Pinaglabanan Shrine, City of San Juan	
Araw ng Pinaglabanan	Aug 30,or Mar 27	San Juan City	
Karomata Festival	Aug 30 to Sep 1	Trinidad, Bohol	
Luponan Festival	Aug 8	Lupon, Davao Oriental	
Birth Anniversary of Pres. Ramon Magsaysay	Aug 31	Iba, Zambales	Commemorates President Ramon Magsaysay

=== September ===
Name	Date range	Location	Notes (commemoration/main attraction(s)
Hinirugyaw Festival	Sep 1 to Sep 10	Cabatuan, Iloilo	
Diyandi Festival	Sep 1 to Oct 2	Iligan City	Honors St. Michael
Hin-ay Festival	Sep 1 to Sep 29	Irosin, Sorsogon	
Bicol Food Festival	Sep 1 to Sep 30	Naga City, Camarines Sur	Festival of Bicol cuisine
Tinu-om Festival	Sep 1 to Sep 5 (1st week)	Cabatuan, Iloilo	
Sarakiki Festival	Sep 1 to Sep 8	Calbayog	features street dancers dressed as cocks
Hadang Festival	Sep 1 to Sep 8	Calbayog	
Feast of Nuestra Señora del Buensuceso	Sep 1 to Sep 9	Parañaque	Honors the Our Lady of the Good Event
Handuraw Festival	Sep 1	Leon, Iloilo	
Baguio Charter Day/Baguio Tourism Month	Sep 1	Baguio	
Hinugyaw Festival / Cotabato Province Foundation Anniversary	Sep 1	Kidapawan City	
Victory Day	Sep 2	Kiangan, Ifugao	
Unang Sigaw ng Nueva Ecija	Sep 2	Palayan City	
Tuna Festival	Sep 3 to Sep 5	General Santos	Celebrates tuna as major product
Tanglawan Festival	Sep 3 to Sep 10	San Jose del Monte, Bulacan	
Sinab'badan Tribal Festival	Sep 5 to Sep 6	Santa Cruz, Davao del Sur	
Buyloganay Festival	Sep 6 to Sep 10	Ivisan, Capiz	
Am-among Festival	Sep 7 to Sep 16	Bontoc, Mountain Province	
Busig-on Festival	Sep 7 to Sep 8	Labo, Camarines Norte	
Sipong Festival	Sep 7	Bais, Negros Oriental	
Padul-ong Festival	Sep 7	Borongan, Eastern Samar	
Kawayan Festival	Sep 7	Maragondon, Cavite	
Kinaiyahan Festival	Sep 7	Dauin, Negros Oriental	
Karatong Festival	Sep 7	Dulag, Leyte	
Taal Lake Festival	Sep 8	Taal Lake	A fluvial parade at the Taal lake honoring the Virgin Mary
Tambobo Festival	Sep 8 to Sep 10	Ajuy, Iloilo	
Minuluan Festival	Sep 8 to Sep 10	Talisay City, Negros Occidental	
Panagdadapun Festival (Araw ng Quirino)	Sep 8 to Sep 10	Cabarroguis, Quirino	
Linggo ng Bulakan	Sep 8 to Sep 15	Malolos, Bulacan	
Singkaban Festival	Sep 8 to Sep 15	Malolos, Bulacan	Highlights the history, culture and tradition of Bulacan province
Anniversary of the Canonical Coronation of the Virgen de Los Remedios	Sep 8	Angeles City and San Fernando, Pampanga	Commemorates the canonical coronation of the Virgen de los Remedios de Pampanga
Araw ng Digos	Sep 8	Digos	
Pista Kadig'garan	Sep 8	Digos	
World Heritage Cities Solidarity Day	Sep 8	Vigan City	
Sadawan Festival	Sep 9	Banton, Romblon	
Flomolok Festival	Sep 9 to Sep 11	Polomolok, South Cotabato	
Kasadyaan Festival	Sep 9 to Sep 11	Tupi, South Cotabato	
Bonok-Bonok Festival	Sep 9	Surigao City	celebrates Surigao culture
Parada ng Kakanin / Festival of Nuestra Señora de Aranzazzu	Sep 9	San Mateo, Rizal	
Tambanipa	Sep 9	Cagayan de Oro	
Sayaw Lahi Festival	Sep 10	Naujan, Oriental Mindoro	
Surigao City Fiesta (San Nicolas de Tolentino)	Sep 10	Surigao City	Honors St. Nicholas de Tolentino
Banhayan Festival/Feast of San Nicolas de Tolentino	Sep 10	Muntinlupa	Honors St. Nicholas de Tolentino
Langaran Festival	Sep 10	Plaridel, Misamis Occidental	
Beachurero Festival	Sep 10	Tacloban City	
Bansaulog Festival	Sep 12 to Sep 18	Bansalan, Davao del Sur	
Anniversary – Battle of Pulang Lupa	Sep 13	Torrijos, Marinduque	
Kapakyanan Festival	Sep 14 to Sep 15	Victoria, Oriental Mindoro	
Golden Harvest Festival	Sep 14 to Sep 21	Valencia, Bukidnon	Harvest festival celebrating rice and corn
Feast of the Triumph of the Cross	Sep 14	San Jose, Tarlac	
Bansalan Festival	Sep 15 to Sep 18	Bansalan	
Bislig City Charter Day	Sep 15 to Sep 19	Bislig	
Voyadores Festival	Sep 15	Pilgrim City of Naga	Young pilgrims and devotees dance on the city streets to give honor to The Virgin of Peñafrancia
Bungag Dagtabinal Festival	Sep 15	Aloran, Misamis Occidental	
Bañamos Festival	Sep 17 to Sep 23	Los Baños, Laguna	Commemorates the establishment of Los Baños, Laguna. Celebrates the bounty of the towns many hotsprings and natural products.
Peñafrancia Festival	Sep(3rd Sunday)	Pilgrim City of Naga	features a novena or 9 days of devotion. Considered one of the largest Marian celebrations in Asia
Galaan Festival	Sep 17	Don Victoriano	
Araw ng Siquijor with Solili	Sep 17, (3rd week)	Siquijor, Siquijor	
Peñafrancia Festival	Sep 18 (3rd Sunday)	Cotabato City	
Karansa Festival	Sep 18 (3rd Sunday)	Danao, Cebu	
Kabuhian Festival	Sep 18 (3rd Sunday)	Ronda, Cebu	
Talakudong Festival	Sep 18	Tacurong City	
Araw ng Bansalan	Sep 18	Bansalan, Davao del Sur	
Binulig Festival	Sep 19 to Sep 25	Panabo City	
Sinawug Festival	Sep 19	Asuncion, Davao del Norte	
Pasalamat Festival	Sep 20 to Sep 22	Dao, Capiz	
Negros Occidental Provincial Tourism Week	Sep 20 to Sep 26	Negros Occidental	
Coco Festival	Sep 20 to Sep 27	Sanchez Mira, Cagayan	
Pagpakanaug	Sep 20	Iligan City	
Araw ng Asuncion	Sep 20	Asuncion, Davao del Norte	
Semana Sang Turismo (Silay Tourism Week)	Sep 21 to Sep 27	Silay City	
Patabang Festival	Sep 21 to Sep 30	Tapaz, Capiz	
Burdang Lumban Festival	Sep 21	Lumban, Laguna	Celebrates the town's embroidery and barong industry
Ma-tzu Festival	Sep 23 to Sep 25	San Fernando, La Union	Celebration by Chinese devotees of the miraculous Virgin of Caysasay or Ma-Tzu – a Chinese deity of the Sung Dynasty
Dumalondong Festival	Sep 23	Esperanza, Agusan del Sur	tribal rituals
Kanlungan Festival	Sep 24	Canlubang, Calamba, Laguna	
Sambuklod Festival	Sep 25 (last Sunday)	San Jose del Monte, Bulacan	
Anihan Festival	Sep 25 to Sep 30	Dueñas, Iloilo	
Drum and Bugle Corp Competition	Sep 25 to Sep 30	Nasipit, Agusan del Norte	
Heritage Tour– Lakbay Malabon	Sep 25 to Sep 30	Malabon	
Agal-Agal Festival	Sep 25	Tawi-Tawi	Celebrates seaweeds as major product
Nuang Festival	Sep 26	San Agustin, Isabela	
Megayon Festival	Sep 27 to Sep 30	Pagadian City, Zamboanga del Sur	thanksgiving festival
Birth Anniversary of General Miguel Malvar	Sep 27	Santo Tomas, BatangasBatangas City	Commemorates Gen. Miguel Carpio Malvar
Anihan Festival	Sep 27	Lobo, Batangas	Commemoration of the foundation of Lobo
Ms. Iligan City	Sep 27	Iligan City	
Karabaw Festival	Sep 27 to Sep 29	Gandara, Samar	A festival which pay tribute to the draft animal that helps people till their farms and provides milk for Gandara's local white cheese delicacy called "Keseo".
Bathan Festival	Sep 28	San Miguel, Leyte	
Passini Kat Aborlan	Sep 28 to Oct 1	Aborlan, Palawan	
Djanggo Festival	Sep 28 to Sep 29	Gattaran, Cagayan	Commemorates centuries-old religious and cultural tradition based on the life of St. Michael
Banigan Festival	Sep 28	Basey, Samar	
Balangiga Anniversary	Sep 28	Balangiga, Eastern Samar	
Pagay Festival	Sep 28	Alicia, Isabela	
Komedya de San Miguel	Sep 28	Iligan City	
Pitlagong Festival	Sep 28	Argao, Cebu	
Kaplag Festival	Sep 28	Mahaplag, Leyte	
Kialegnon Festival	Sep 23 to Sep 28	Magsaysay, Davao del Sur	Weeklong celebration of the town's culture, harvest festival
D'Dalaylay Festival	Sep 29	Jalajala, Rizal	
Halad Sayaw Pasalamat Festival	Sep 29, or Sep 25	Tangub City	Showcases local rituals, dances, and way of life; formerly known as the Dalit Festival
Banigan-Kawayan Festival	Sep 29	Basey, Samar	Celebrates the banig and the kawayan crafts industry
Angel Festival	Sep 29	San Rafael, Bulacan	
Pangalipay Festival	Sep 29	Magsaysay, Palawan	
Lapay Bantigue Dance Festival	Sep 29	Masbate City	
Sinu-og Estokada Festival	Sep 29	Jagna, Bohol	
Feast of Nuestra Señora de Peñafrancia	September (3rd Saturday)	Naga City, Camarines Sur	Honors the Our Lady of Peñafrancia
T'boli Tribal Festival	September (3rd week)	South Cotabato	A gathering of the major ethnolinguistic groups in the province
Tumandok Festival	September (3rd week)	Iloilo City	
Kabankalan City Tourism Week	September (4th week)	Kabankalan City, Negros Occidental	
Kalivungan Festival	September	Cotabato	Celebration of intertribal harmony and thanksgiving festival

=== October ===
Name	Date range	Location	Notes (commemoration/main attraction(s)
Parau Festival	Oct 1 to Oct 12	Pilar, Sorsogon	
Talulot Festival	Oct 1 to Oct 2	Pasay	Celebration named after flower petals
Tuao Patronal Fiesta	Oct 1 to Oct 2	Tuao, Cagayan	
Paruyan Festival	Oct 1 to Oct 4	Talisay, Camarines Norte	
Pasinayaan Festival	Oct 1 to Oct 5	Hagonoy, Davao del Sur	
Unod Festival	Oct 1 to Oct 7	Castilla, Sorsogon	
Mambulawan Festival	Oct 1 to Oct 7	Jose Panganiban, Camarines Norte	
Hudyaka sa Plaza	Oct 1 to Oct 7	Montevista, Davao de Oro	
Pista ng Gubat	Oct 1	Pandan, Antique	
Kawayanan Festival	Oct 1	Gloria, Oriental Mindoro	
Dilaab Festival	Oct 1	Siquijor	
Kariton Festival	Oct 2 to Oct 5	Tupi, South Cotabato	
Kinilaw Festival	Oct 2	Surigao City	
Feast of Our Lady of La Naval	Oct 3 to Oct 12	Quezon City	Honors the Our Lady of La Naval
Pista ng Batampasig	Oct 3 to Nov 26	Pasig	
Sinanggiyaw Festival	Oct 4	Dumanjug, Cebu	
Pagoda Festival	Oct 4	Cardona, Rizal	Honors St. Francis of Assisi
Kidapawan City Fruit Festival	Oct 5 to Oct 10, or August (2nd week)	Kidapawan City	
La Torre Festival	Oct 6	Cardona, Rizal	
Harana sa Makati	Oct 6	Makati	
Pagbiagan Festival/Baggat Dekat Festival and Solano Town Fiesta	Oct 7 to Oct 8	Solano, Nueva Vizcaya	
Dahunog Festival	Oct 7	Dipolog	Honors the Our Lady of the Holy Rosary
Bagabag Town Fiesta	Oct 7	Bagabag, Nueva Vizcaya	
Eggstravaganza Festival	Oct 8 (2nd Friday)	San Jose, Batangas	
Malampaya Festival	Oct 8 to Oct 12	Taytay, Palawan	
Bagius Festival	Oct 8	Angeles City	
Catandungan Festival	October	Catanduanes	Festival featuring the Pantomina Catanduanes, a local dance
Lubi-lubi Festival	Oct 8	Glan, Sarangani	
Charter Anniversary of Koronadal City	Oct 8	Koronadal City	
Zamboanga Hermosa Festival	Oct 10 to Oct 12	Zamboanga City	Honors the Our Lady of the Pillar (Nuestra Senora del Pilar Zaragosa)
Kasanggayahan Festival	Oct 10 to Oct 17, or Oct 17 to Oct 27	Sorsogon, Sorsogon	Foundation anniversary of Sorsogon
Ting'udo Festival	Oct 10	Makilala, Cotabato	A fruit harvest festival
Karakol Festival	Oct 10	Mamburao, Occidental Mindoro	
Kanduli Festival	Oct 10	Lutayan, Sultan Kudarat	
Kaimonan Festival	Oct 10	Tagum City	
Feast of La Naval	Oct 11, (2nd Sunday)	Quezon City and Angeles City	Honors the Our Lady of La Naval , commemorates the victory at sea against the Dutch in 1646
Kaaldawan Iraya	Oct 12	Puerto Galera, Oriental Mindoro	
Feast of Nuestra Señora del Pilar	Oct 12	Mamburao, Occidental Mindoro	Honors the Our Lady of the Pillar
Buglasan Festival	Oct 14 to Oct 23	Dumaguete	
Inug-og Festival	Oct 14, or Oct 15	Oroquieta City	Honors the Our Lady of the Holy Rosary
Octubafest	Oct 14	Tacloban City	
Lisagan Festival	Oct 15 (3rd Saturday)	Magallanes, Agusan del Norte	
Inasal/Halad Festival	Oct 15	Talisay, Cebu	
Sagingan Festival	Oct 16 to Oct 17,	Tubod, Lanao del Norte	Honors San Isidro Labrador
Lanzones Festival	Oct 16 to Oct 22 (3rd week), or (4th week)	Mambajao, Camiguin	Celebrates the abundance of lanzones
Pamugu-an Festival	Oct 16 to Oct 22	Mansalay, Oriental Mindoro	
Cimarrones Festival	Oct 16 to Oct 26	Pili, Camarines Sur	Honors the Cimarrones tribesmen who roamed slopes of Mount Isarog in the 17th century.
Calbayog Grand Karakol	Oct 16	Calbayog	Honors St. Rafael
Rahugan Festival	Oct 17 to Oct 24	Basud, Camarines Norte	
Musa Festival	Oct 19 to Oct 21	Kapalong, Davao del Norte	
Tugob Festival	Oct 20 to Oct 22	Ormoc City	thanksgiving festival for the bounty of the city
Enchanting Balete Festival	Oct 20 to Oct 24 (culmination)	Balete, Aklan	Celebrates the culture and traditions of Balete townsfolk
Leyte Gulf Landing Anniversary	Oct 20	Dulag and Palo, Leyte	Commemoration of the Leyte Gulf Landing
Cave Festival	Oct 20	Laak, Davao de Oro	
Binalayan (Binangonan sa Lawa at Kawayan) Festival	Oct 21	Binangonan, Rizal	Showcases bamboo products and other marine merchandises
Sunggod to Kumanga Tribal Inter-community Solidarity Festival	Oct 21 to Oct 22	Panabo City	
Coffee Festival	Oct 21	Lipa City, Batangas	Celebrates coffee as major product of Lipa
Catadungan Festival (Padayaw)	Oct 22 to Oct 24	Virac, Catanduanes	Commemorates the province's separation from Albay
Apo Iraya Festival	Oct 23	Abra de Ilog, Occidental Mindoro	Celebrations of the ethnic Iraya Mangyan peoples of Abra de Ilog. Honors the deity Apo Iraya
Sambuokan Festival	Oct 24 to Oct 31	Mati City, Davao Oriental	
Pakaradjan Festival	Oct 24 to Oct 31	Tagum City	
Haw-as Festival	Oct 25 to Oct 28	Dumangas, Iloilo	
Battle of Surigao Strait Commemoration	Oct 25	Surigao City, Surigao del Norte	Commemorates the Battle of Surigao Strait
Banayan Festival	Oct 26 to Oct 28	Banaybanay, Davao Oriental	
Niyogan Festival	Oct 26 to Oct 29	Baganga, Davao Oriental	
Kalibulongan	Oct 27 to Oct 28	Talaingod, Davao del Norte	
Aeta Festival	Oct 27	Botolan, Zambales	
Kahimonan Festival	Oct 28 to Oct 29	Laak, Davao de Oro	
Aswang Festival	Oct 29 to Oct 30	Roxas City	A celebration of the Aswang. No longer celebrated due to pressure from Christian religious groups.
Hinugyaw sa Anilao	Oct 31	Anilao, Iloilo	
Apo Fiesta	Oct 31	Angeles City	
Halaran Festival	October (1st week)	Roxas City	Highlights the history and culture of Capizenos during pre-Hispanic times
Universal Children's Festival	October (1st week)	Dapitan	Involves children of locals, dressed in costumes of UN member countries, parading around the city
Tingguian Festival	October (1st week)	Bangued, Abra	
Pyestang Tugak (Frog Festival)	October (1st week)	San Fernando City	
MassKara Festival	October (Highlights on 4th Sunday)	Bacolod	MassKara Festival is an annual festival in Bacolod City with highlights every fourth Sunday of October with street dancers in colorful costumes, masks and headdresses. Masskara Festival
Megayon Festival	October (3rd week)	Tigbao, Zamboanga del Sur	A harvest festival
Fiestang Kuliat (Tigtigan, Terakan Keng Dalan)	October (last week), Oct 28 to Oct 29	Angeles, Pampanga	Tigtigan Terakan Keng Dalan (TTKD), celebrated in Angeles City, Pampanga, is a vibrant street festival that marks the culmination of the month-long Fiestang Kuliat every October. Established in 1992 as a response to the devastation caused by the 1991 Mt. Pinatubo eruption, TTKD symbolizes rebirth and showcasing the resiliency and triumph of the Kapampangan people. Initially organized by then-Mayor Edgardo Pamintuan, it encouraged local businesses to bring their services to the streets for two nights of music and dancing to revitalize the community. Organized by JCI Culiat with LGU.
Calacatchara Festival	October (no definite date)	Calaca, Batangas	
Tinapa Festival	October (no definite date)	Rosario, Cavite	
Tamaraw Festival	October (no definite date)	Occidental Mindoro (provincewide)	
La Naval Festival	October	nationwide	
Raniag Twilight Festival	October	Vigan City	Part of the local people's tradition of giving light to the spirits of departed loved ones

=== November ===
Name	Date range	Location	Notes (commemoration/main attraction(s)
Festival of Lights	Nov 1	Sagada, Mountain Province	
Banaag Festival	Nov 1	Anilao, Iloilo	
Grand Perangat Festival	Nov 1-10 (second Saturday)	Oroquieta City, Misamis Occidental	Provincial Festival, highlight of the Provincial Founding Anniversary Celebration
Tumba Festival (Candle Festival)	Nov 2	San Luis, Batangas	
Pintaflores Festival	Nov 3 to Nov 5	San Carlos City, Negros Occidental	Honors St. Charles Borromeo
San Carlos City Fiesta	Nov 4	San Carlos City, Negros Occidental	
Kansilay Festival	Nov 5 to Nov 13	Silay City, Negros Occidental	
Angono Arts Festival	Nov 5 to Nov 25	Angono, Rizal	
Negros Day	Nov 5	Negros Occidental	
El Cinco de Noviembre / Kansilay Festival	Nov 5	Bago, Negros Occidental	
Bagat Festival / Araw ng Sibagat	Nov 6	Sibagat, Agusan del Sur	
Helobong Festival (Helubong)	Nov 9 to Nov 15 (2nd week)	Lake Sebu, South Cotabato	
Sandurot Festival	Nov 9 to Nov 15	Dumaguete	
Visayas-Mindanao Drum and Bugle Corps	Nov 9 to Nov 15	Mindanao area / Cagayan de Oro	
Taw-anay Gugma	Nov 11	Dumalag, Capiz	
Kalag-Kalag Festival	Nov 13	Cebu City	
Pandag-kitab Oriental Mindoro	Nov 14	Calapan	Provincial festival
Founding Anniversary of Occidental Mindoro	Nov 15	Mamburao, Occidental Mindoro	
La Union Surfing Invitational/Surfing Festival	Nov 17 to Nov 19	San Juan, La Union	
Kahilwayan Festival/Cry of Santa Barbara	Nov 17	Santa Barbara, Iloilo	
Urukay Festival	Nov 18 to Nov 19	Anini-y, Antique	
Baguio Arts Festival	Nov 18	Baguio	
Inilusan	Nov 20 to Nov 25	Mambusao, Capiz	
Inilusan	Nov 20 to Nov 25	Mambusao, Capiz	
Pinnakan Festival	Nov 20 to Nov 25	Luna, La Union	
Kalimudan Festival	Nov 21	Isulan, Sultan Kudarat	tribal fiesta
Higantes Festival	Nov 22 to Nov 23	Angono, Rizal	Honors St. Clement. Made famous by giant papier mache effigies of giants parading on the streets
Guinakit of Maguindanao	Nov 22	Rio Grande de Mindanao	Boat parade
Cordillera Festival	Nov 22	Baguio	
Kabkaban Festival	Nov 23 to Nov 29	Carcar, Cebu	
Benguet Foundation Day	Nov 23	Benguet	
Santa Ipon Festival	Nov 25 to Dec 25	Santa, Ilocos Sur	Thanksgiving celebration highlighted by the catching of the ipon
Feast of Santa Catalina	Nov 26	Mansalay, Oriental Mindoro	
Paruparo Festival	Nov 26	Dasmariñas, Cavite	
Panangedayew	Nov 27	Dagupan	
Feast of the Immaculate Conception	Nov 29 to Dec 8	Puerto Princesa City	
Day-ang Di Onga Festival	Nov 30	Baguio	Features young Cordillerans in a day-long event to "celebrate life"
Annual Pinatubo Trek (A March to Peace Tranquility)	Nov 30	Capas, Tarlac	
Adivay	Nov	La Trinidad, Benguet	Celebration of culture and tradition of Benguet ethnic tribes
P'yagsawitan Festival	November (3rd week), Nov 18 to Nov 25	Maragusan, Davao de Oro	Involves performances by indigenous groups of the area, and harvest-related thanksgiving rituals
Kawayanan Festival	November (3rd week)	Pagadian, Zamboanga del Sur	Celebrates bamboo as major product
Binabayani Festival	November (last week)	Masinloc, Zambales	Re-enacts the war between the Aetas and the Christians through dance
Crown Festival	November (third week)	Taytay, Rizal	
Tan-Ok ni Ilocano Festival of Festivals	November (third week)	Ilocos Norte	A festival wherein the municipalities and cities of the provinces showcases their our tradition and cultures.The pride of Ilocanos.
Pas'ungko s'g Mis Occ	November (month-long)	Misamis Occidental	

=== December ===
Part of Christmas

Name	Date range	Location	Notes (commemoration/main attraction(s)10,>
SumBingTik (Suman, Bibingka, Latik) Festival	Dec 1	Cainta, Rizal	Celebrates suman, bibingka and latik
Luglugan - Pancit Malabon Festival	Dec 1 to Dec 10	Malabon	Celebrates the Pancit Malabon, a famous rice noodle dish
Rimat ti Amianan	Dec 1 to Dec 18	San Fernando City, La Union	
Kamundagan Festival	Dec 1 to Dec 31	Naga City, Camarines Sur	
Sinukwan Festival	Dec 1 to Dec 7	San Fernando City	
Hugyawan Dalansayaw	Dec 1 to Dec 7	Dumaguete	
Pasigahan sa Balingasag	Dec 1 to Jan 7	Balingasag, Misamis Oriental	
Galicayo Festival	Dec 1 to Dec 9	Manaoag, Pangasinan	
Kabakahan Festival	Dec 1	Padre Garcia, Batangas	
Kalamay Festival	Dec 2	San Enrique, Iloilo	
Fiesta de Los Toros	Dec 2	Nasugbu, Batangas	
Yugyugan Festival	Dec 3 to Dec 12	Pagsanjan, Laguna	
Sinadya sa Halara Festival	Dec 3 to Dec 8	Roxas City, Capiz	thanksgiving festival
Paskuhan sa Maraykit	Dec 5 (1st Saturday)	San Juan, Batangas	
Tangub City Christmas Festival of Lights	Dec 6	Tangub City	
Pag-alad Festival	Dec 7 to Dec 8	San Fernando, Romblon	
Pagoda and Caracol (Fluvial Parade)	Dec 7 to Dec 9	Malabon	
Rungawan Festival	Dec 8	Concepcion, Romblon	Sibale Island
Hinugyawan Festival	Dec 8	Santa Maria, Romblon	Tablas Island
Fluvial Procession at Taal	Dec 8 to Dec 9	Taal, Batangas	Honors the Immaculate Conception
Tag-anitohan	Dec 8 to Dec 9	Tudela, Cebu (Camotes Island)	
Rehiyon-Rehiyon	Dec 8	Marikina	
Immaculate Conception Day	Dec 8	Cotabato City	Honors the Immaculate Conception
Feast of Immaculate Conception (Burunyugan)	Dec 8	Puerto Princesa City	Honors the Immaculate Conception
Adyawan Festival/ Coco festival San Teodoro Day and Immaculate Conception Feast	Dec 8	San Teodoro, Oriental Mindoro	Honors the Immaculate Conception and St. Theodore
Bonggahan sa Valencia	Dec 10	Valencia City, Bukidnon	
Pampanga Day	Dec 11	San Fernando, Pampanga	
Kasadyaan Festival (Mardi Gras)	Dec 12 to Dec 14	Dumaguete	
Parayan Festival	Dec 12	Pototan, Iloilo	
Festival of Lights & Music	Dec 12	La Carlota City	
Pastores Bicol	Dec 12	Legazpi City	
Lambayok Festival	Dec 12	San Juan, Batangas	
Bod-bod Festival	Dec 14 to Dec 16	Tanjay City, Negros Oriental	
San Fernando Giant Lantern Festival	Dec 14 to Dec 20, or (month long)	San Fernando, Pampanga	Christmas lanterns
Kanyong Kawayan Festival	Dec 14 to Dec 20	Kidapawan City	
Shariff Kabunsuan Festival	Dec 15 to Dec 19	Cotabato City / Maguindanao del Norte	Celebrates Shariff Kabungsuan, first sultan of Maguindanao
Pantatan Festival	Dec 15 to Dec 19	Zarraga, Iloilo	
Lantern Festival	Dec 15 to Dec 31	Bacolod	
Misa de Gallo	Dec 16 to Dec 24	nationwide	Traditional Christmas midnight masses
Iwag Christmas Lights Festival	Dec 16 to Dec 31	Pototan, Iloilo	
Sorsogon Festival	Dec 16	Sorsogon City	
Palupok Bayong Festival	Dec 18	Santa Barbara, Iloilo	
Tultugan Festival	Dec 21 to Dec 27	Maasin, Iloilo	
Araw ng Montalban/Pamitinan Festival	Dec 21	Rodriguez, Rizal	
Christmas Food Street Festival	Dec 22	Cebu City	
Maytinis Festival	Dec 24	Kawit, Cavite	A retelling of the Christmas story through float parades
Kanyon-kanyon Festival (Patunog-tunog Kanyon sa New Year)	Dec 25 to Dec 31	Santa Barbara, Iloilo	
Pasidungog	Dec 25 to Dec 31	San Miguel, Iloilo	
Puto Festival	Dec 26 to Dec 28	Calasiao, Pangasinan	
Idioc Festival	Dec 27	Cajidiocan, Romblon	Sibuyan Island
Handuraw Festival	Dec 27 to Dec 31	Dapitan	
Kaliugyon Festival	Dec 28 to Jan 1	Libacao, Aklan	
Pawil Dagupan	Dec 28 to Dec 31	Dagupan	
Majigangga Festival	Dec 28	Santa Ana, Pampanga	Christmas festivities in Sta. Ana, Pampanga, Philippines celebrates the Pimpeño community's culture and artistry with a massive puppet dance.
Niños Inosentes Day (Yawa-yawa Festival)	Dec 28	Ibajay, Aklan	Commemorates the Holy Innocents
Horse Festival	Dec 29 to Dec 30	Plaridel, Bulacan	
Rizal's Death Anniversary	Dec 30	Dapitan	commemorates the death of Jose Rizal, Filipino patriot
Torotot Festival	Dec 31 to Jan 1	Davao City	
Pakalog sa Pasig	Dec 31	Pasig	
Kaluskos Bamboo Arch Festival	December (month long)	Cardona, Rizal	
Damili Festival	December (month long)	San Nicolas, Ilocos Norte	Give thanks to its patron (St Nicholas) and the art of pottery
Sanghiyang Festival		Alfonso, Cavite	
World Costume Festival		Vigan City	international event
Buntal Hat Festival		Baliuag, Bulacan	buntal hat weaving

Bacolod, Philippines<ref name=

== See also ==
- Christmas in the Philippines
- Holy Week in the Philippines
- Film festivals in the Philippines
- Music festivals in the Philippines
- Public holidays in the Philippines
- Patronal festival
