= Kasanggayahan Festival =

Festival in Sorsogon, Philippines

- Status: Active
- Genre: Cultural, historical, religious
- Date: October
- Frequency: Annual
- Locations: Sorsogon, Philippines
- Years active: 1974–present

The Kasanggayahan Festival is an annual cultural, historical, and religious festival held every October in the province of Sorsogon, Philippines. It commemorates the province's founding anniversary and serves as a month-long showcase of local heritage, economic progress, and community spirit. The name 'Kasanggayahan' derives from an old Bikol word meaning; "prosperity, abundance, and a life of contentment".

What began as a modest local celebration has evolved into one of the most anticipated and well-loved festivals in the Bicol Region and across the Philippines, drawing thousands of visitors each year.

With its colorful street parades, powerful cultural performances, and participation from national and international guests, the festival has become a platform for showcasing Filipino creativity, resilience, and unity. It also serves as a celebration of empowerment – uplifting the local economy, promoting sustainable tourism, and reinforcing pride in Sorsogon's identity. Most notably, the Kasanggayahan Festival earned international recognition in 2019 when it broke the Guinness World Record for the largest Pantomina folk dance performance, involving over 7,000 dancers.

== Etymology ==
The festival's name reflects the old Bikol expression:

"When the fields are green and the grains are golden;
when the fishes abound the rivers and seas;
when the homes are peaceful and people are happy — that is Kasanggayahan."

The word "Kasanggayahan" is derived from the Sorsoganon word for prosperity and happiness, and is the largest festival celebrated in the whole Sorsogon province.

== History ==
Sorsogon became a separate province from Albay on October 17, 1894. The festival was institutionalised in 1974 during the administration of Governor Juan Frivaldo.

Over the years, the festival has expanded into a major regional and national event, drawing performers and tourists alike.

== Events ==
=== National Festival of Festivals ===
The National Festival of Festivals is held at the Sorsogon Sports Complex, one of Southern Luzon's largest sporting venues. Provincial cultural contingents perform traditional dances, competing for what is considered the largest prize pool in Philippine festival history: In 2025 this figures are ₱5 million (champion), ₱3.5 million (second place), ₱2 million (third place), and ₱500,000 (fourth place).

=== Miss Kasanggayahan Philippines ===
The "Miss Kasanggayahan Philippines" pageant honors modern Filipinas who embody truth, identity, purpose, and advocacy aligned with the provincial 7K Program (health, education, livelihood, infrastructure, tourism, environment, and peace and order). It is recognized by pageant enthusiasts for offering what is described as the largest cash prize in Philippine pageantry, surpassing traditional competitions such as Binibining Pilipinas and Miss Universe Philippines.

=== Guinness World Record – Pantomina sa Tinampo ===
On October 31, 2019, the festival achieved a Guinness World Record for the largest Filipino folk dance. A total of 7,127 participants performed the traditional Pantomina sa Tinampo, a Bicolano courtship dance, along a five kilometre route in Sorsogon City over 30 minutes under rain. The event included participants from all 14 municipalities and Sorsogon City, led by then-Governor Chiz Escudero and his wife, actress Heart Evangelista. The Department of Tourism praised the achievement as a "powerful symbol of unity and cultural pride."

=== Concerts and entertainment ===
The festival also features nightly concerts by nationally renowned performers such as Vice Ganda, Sarah Geronimo, Matteo Guidicelli, Bamboo, Parokya ni Edgar, KZ Tandingan, TJ Monterde, Ben&Ben, FlowG, Skusta Clee, Zack Tabudlo, Erik Santos, and Kyla, drawing large audiences and boosting tourism.

=== Other Activities ===
Other festival highlights include:

- Street dancing and civic parades
- Agro‑industrial fairs and trade expos
- Cultural and historical exhibits
- Food fairs showcasing local specialties
- Nightly performances and family‑oriented entertainment

== Significance ==
The Kasanggayahan Festival serves as:

- A thanksgiving celebration for provincial blessings
- A platform for cultural preservation and promotion
- A key economic and tourism driver
- A forum for strengthening community identity and pride

== See also ==
- Festivals in the Philippines
- Culture of the Philippines
