= Lubi-Lubi =

Traditional Filipino song

Lubi-Lubi or An Mga Bulan ('The Months') is a traditional Filipino song that originally was a Waray folk song.

== Lyrics ==
=== Common lyrics ===
Enero, Pebrero, Marso, Abril, Mayo,
Hunyo, Hulyo, Agosto,
Setyembre, Oktubre,
Nobyembre, Disyembre,
Lubi-lubi.

Halina at pag-aralan
Ngalan ng labindalawang buwan
Ulit-ulitin natin bigkasin
Sabay-sabay nating awitin

=== Original Waray lyrics ===
Lubi-lubi lubi, lubi lingkuranay
Ayaw gad pagsak-i, kay hibubo-ay.
Ayaw gad pagsak-i,
Lubi-lubi

Kon maruruyag ka kumaon hin silot
Didto la nga didto la
Kan Nanay nga didto la.
Kan Tatay nga didto la, pakigsabot.

Agidaw-gidaw an bukaw
Naglupad-lupad ha igbaw
Agidaw-gidaw an gitgit
Naglupad-lupad ha langit

Agidaw-gidaw an bukaw
Naglupad-lupad ha igbaw
Agidaw-gidaw an gitgit
Linmupad ha langit

Enero, Pebrero, Marso, Abril, Mayo,
Hunyo, Hulyo, Agosto,
Setyembre, Oktubre,
Nobyembre, Desyembre,
Lubi-lubi.

== Versions ==
There are at least twenty recordings of Lubi-Lubi. It is a traditional Filipino song. The song is used to help memorize the months of the year.

== In popular culture ==
In 1970, the song was first made into a lullaby which was originally recorded by Antonio Regalario and performed by Restituta Tutañez. In 2023, the Cultural Center of the Philippines' Himig Himbing: Mga Heleng Atin included the song together with other Filipino songs and hele to promote indigenous lullabies.
