= Kumbira =

Kumbira is a professional and student culinary show and live competition held in Cagayan de Oro, Mindanao, Philippines. It is the largest culinary event in Mindanao, lasting for three days. Kumbira means "dinner party" or "feast" in Cebuano, usually referring to party occasions such as birthdays, weddings and bigger events such as fiestas. It possibly came from a Spanish word comida means "food", or convida means "to invite".
