= Dinamulag Festival =

Festival held in the Philippines

- Observed by: Zambales
- Type: Cultural, Local
- Date: March or April

The Dinamulag Festival also known as the Zambales Mango Festival is an annual festival held in the province of Zambales in the Philippines to celebrate or encourage bountiful harvest of the province's mangoes. The festival was first held in 1999. The mascot is a mango.

== Background ==
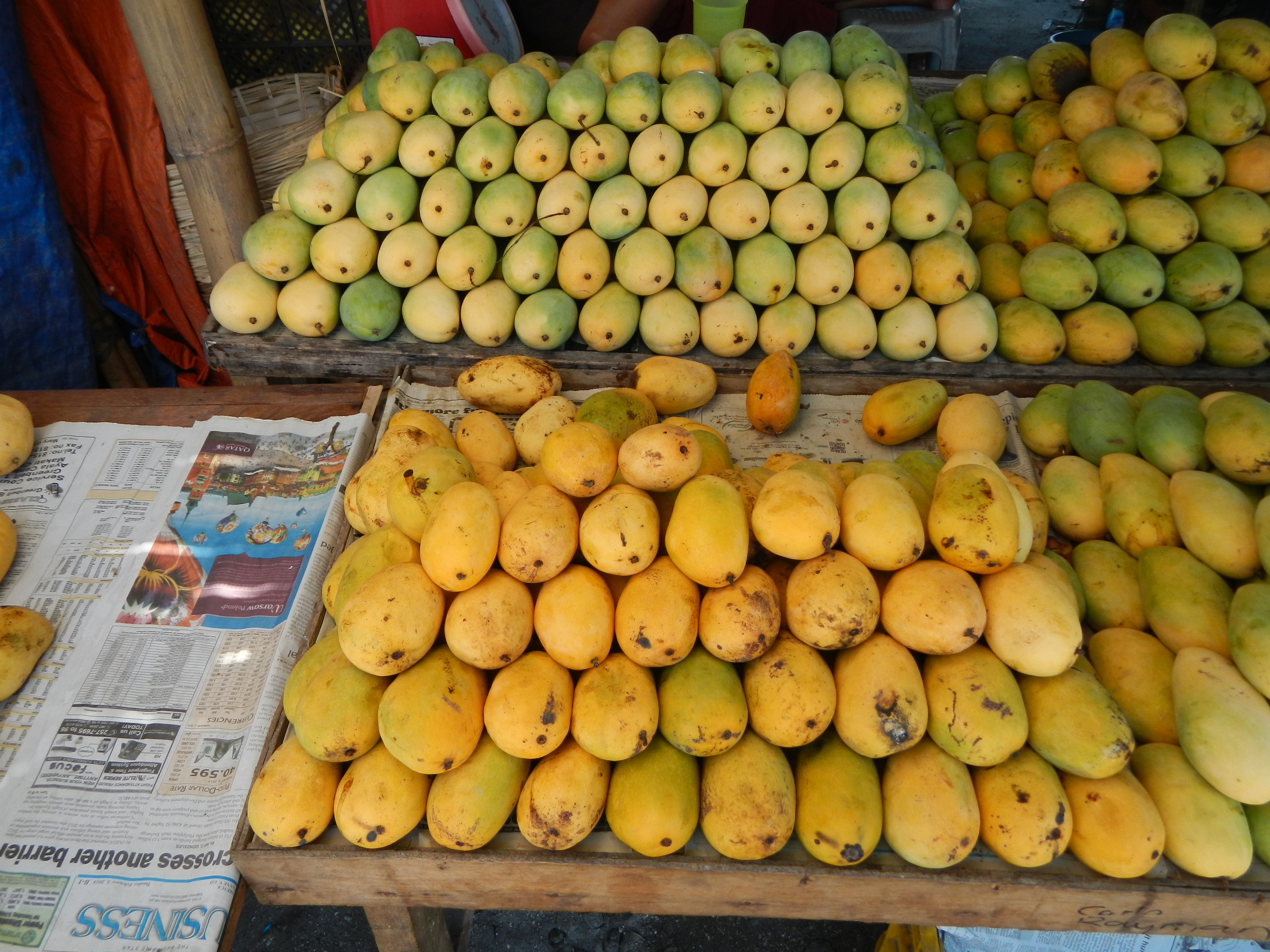
Mangoes being sold in Iba, Zambales

Mangoes are a primary crop of the province of Zambales. Mangoes harvest in the town of Palauig are mostly exported to other provinces and Metro Manila. The festival is held to celebrate bountiful harvest of mangoes in the provinces.

Mangoes cultivated in Zambales particularly the Dinamulag variety of Carabao mangoes were cited as the world's sweetest mangoes by Guinness World Records in 1995 and the country's sweetest mangoes by the Department of Agriculture in 2013.

In 2015, other events unrelated to the province's mangoes such as sports events were introduced while the province's fruit remain the centerpiece of the festival.

== 18th Dinamulag Festival ==
The 18th Dinamulag Festival was held on April 4-8, 2017 at Iba People's Park in Iba, Zambales.

One of the highlights of the festival was the Street Dancing Competition, which The Masinloc Street Dancers won. They also have the most titles with seven on the event.

Some of the guests of the that event were Senator Teofisto "TG" Guingona, Chicser Group among others. Also came to the said festival are some local officials of Zambales like Iba Mayor Rundstedt Ebdane, Botolan Mayor Bing Maniquiz, Candelaria Mayor Napoleon Edquid, Board Member Renato Collado, Board Member Sancho Abasta Jr.

=== Events and highlights ===
- Street Dancing Competition, a street dancing Event.
- Binibining Zambales, A beauty pageant Event.
- LARONG LAHI
- Pet Show,
- Likhang Buhangin Sand Sculpting Competition
- Mr & Ms Body Beautiful, A beauty pageant event.
- Zamba Tuklas Talento, a talent event,
- FUN RUN
- Zambales Cookfest
- Bayle Zambales Street Dancing Parade and Showdown
- Fireworks Display, A fireworks display event

== Results ==
=== Street Dancing Competition ===
Street Dancing Results
Year	1st	2nd	3rd
2016	Masinloc Street Dancers; Prize: P150,000.00	Botolan Street Dancers; Prize: P130,000.00	Candelaria Street Dancers; Prize: P100,000.00

=== Binibining Zambales ===
Binibining Zambales Results
Year	Binibining Zambales	Binibining Zambales Turismo	1st Runner-Up	2nd Runner-Up
2024	Patricia McGee	Joanna Limbaro	Keithrieann Denise Ramirez	Princess Julianne Opiaza
2016	Christine Juliane Opiaza (Castillejos)		Elaiza Dee Alzona (Botolan)	Natasha Michelle Galo (San Felipe)
2015	Nicole Shaye Dichoso (San Narciso)			
2014				
2013	Alyssa Mariz Encarnation (Palauig)		Sandra Mae Basco Grate	Christine Racel
