= Pintados-Kasadyaan =

Celebration in Tacloban, Philippines

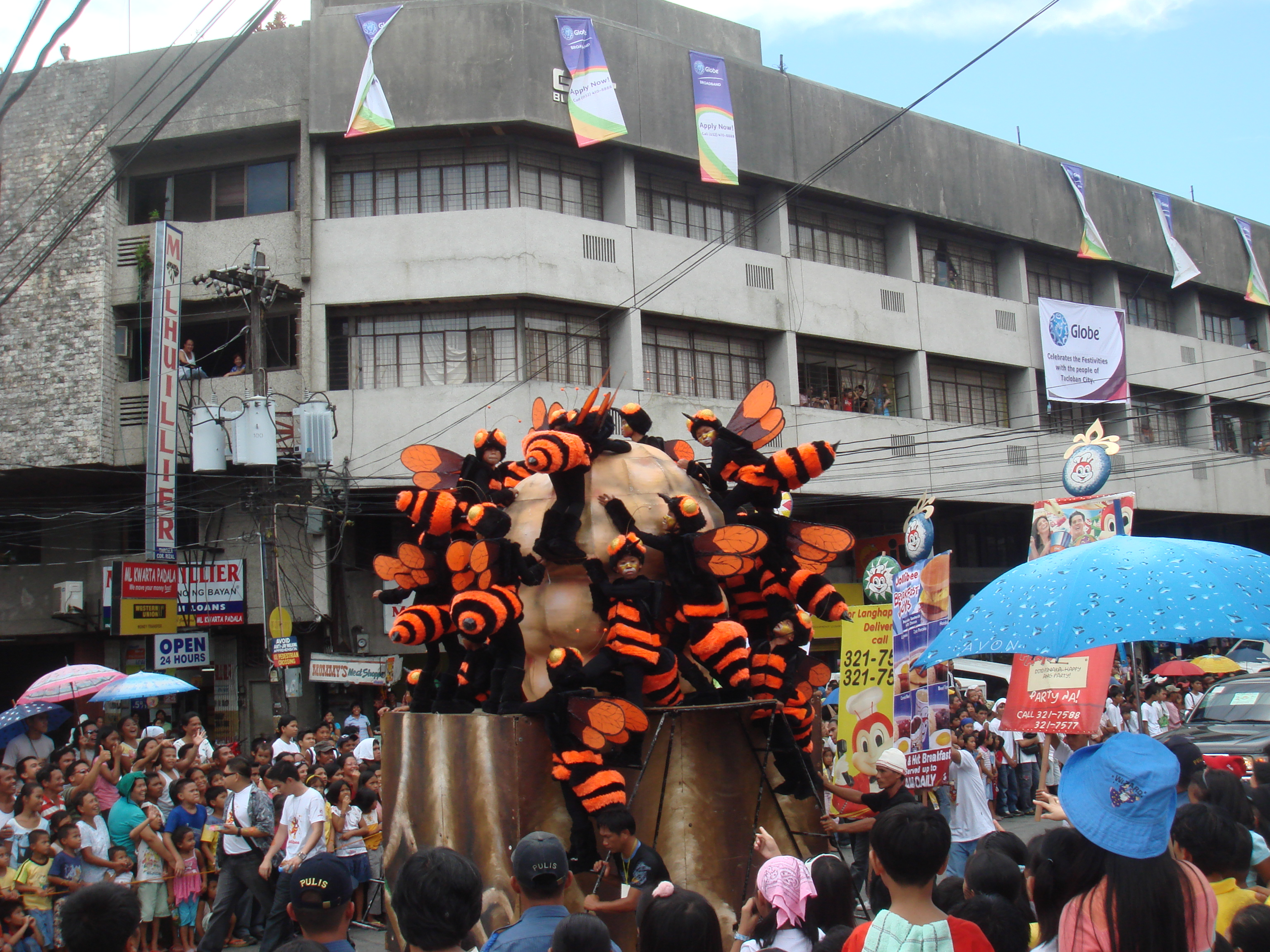
Buyogan Festival joining the Pintados-Kasadyaan festival

The Pintados Festival is a cultural-religious celebration in Tacloban, Philippines, based on the body-painting traditions of the ancient tattooed "pintados" warriors. In 1986, the Pintados Foundation, Inc. was formed by the people of Tacloban to organize this festival in honor of Señor Santo Niño. Years later, it was merged with the Kasadyaan Festival which is always held on June 29.

== History ==
"Pinados," or "piatos people," is a term that refers to the native Filipinos who Spanish colonizers encountered in the 16th century. Centuries of Spanish occupation affected Filipino culture and much of the history surrounding tribal tattoos is concentrated on the Visayan (including the people of Tacloban) and Igorot peoples. Due to their relative isolation, ethnic groups such as the Ifugao have resisted Spanish cooptation more so than others in the Philippines.

== Events ==
The Pintados-Kasadyaan festival includes multiple events throughout the celebration. These events are called the Festival of festivals of Leyte, the Ritual Dance Presentation of Pintados Festival, and the “Pagrayhay” during the Grand Parade.

KASADYAAN FESTIVAL OF FESTIVALS
Participants	Festivals
Municipality of Isabel	Sinuog Festival
Municipality of Hindang	Indang Festival
Municipality of Tabontabon	Tabon Festival
Municipality of Hilongos	Alikaraw Festival
Municipality of Bato	Bato-Balani Festival
Municipality of Capoocan	Lantawan Festival
Municipality of Tabango	Buling-Buling Festival
Municipality of Mahaplag	Kaplag Festival
Municipality of Tanauan	Pasaka Festival
Municipality of La Paz	Viajedores Festival
City of Baybay	Binaybayon Festival
Municipality of Barugo	Sanggutan Festival
Municipality of Burauen	Buraburon Festival
Municipality of Alangalang	Lingganay Festival
Municipality of Jaro	Haro-Tambalan Festival
Municipality of Babatngon	Tambula Festival
Municipality of Dulag	Karatong Festival
Municipality of Sta. Fe	Pamilipig Festival
Municipality of Abuyog	Buyogan Festival
Municipality of Tolosa	Tolo-Usa Festival

== Pintados-Kasadyaan festival winners ==
KASADYAAN FESTIVAL OF FESTIVALS WINNERS
Year	Champion	2nd Place	3rd Place
2024	Buyogan Festival (Abuyog)	Karayhakan Festival (Javier)	Lingganay Festival (Alangalang)
2019	Pasaka Festival (Tanauan)	Tolo-Usa Festival (Tolosa)	Makarato Festival (Matuginao)
2018	Pasaka Festival (Tanauan)	Buraburon Festival (Burauen)	Sanggutan Festival (Barugo)
2017	Buraburon Festival (Burauen)	Buyugan Festival (Abuyog)	Sanggutan Festival (Barugo)
2016	Sanggutan Festival (Barugo)		\
2013	Buyogan Festival (Abuyog)	Lingganay Festival (Alangalang)	Viajedores Festival (La Paz)
2012	Lingganay Festival (Alangalang)	Pasaka Festival (Tanauan)	Karatong Festival (Dulag)
2011	Lingganay Festival (Alangalang)	Karatong Festival (Dulag)	Pamilipig Festival (Sta. Fe)
2010	Buyogan Festival (Abuyog)	Karatong Festival (Dulag)	Viajedores Festival (La Paz)
2009	Pasaka Festival (Tanauan)	Karatong Festival (Dulag)	Batobalani Festival (Bato)
2008	Buyogan Festival (Abuyog)	Karatong Festival (Dulag)	Alikaraw Festival (Hilongos)
2007	Buyogan Festival (Abuyog)	Alikaraw Festival (Hilongos)	Lingganay Festival (Alangalang)
2006	Buyogan Festival (Abuyog)	Karatong Festival (Dulag)	Alikaraw Festival (Hilongos)

== See also ==
- Sangyaw
