= Talabukon Festival =

Philippine religious celebration

Talabukon Festival is a religious celebration in the municipality of Looc, Romblon province, Philippines, held during the 3rd week of April. It is held both to honor St. Joseph and to celebrate a genie who once saved the townfolks, which in the process of protecting the people inspired the inhabitants to name their place "Looc" (choke).

Early inhabitants of the islands which have Malay (from the present day Panay) and Negritos (from the present-day Mindoro) origins peacefully lived in present-day island known as Tablas Island. The group of villagers who occupied the southwestern part of the island like all other inhabitants of the island are well aware of notorious group of people called Moros for plundering, ransacking, and towns and villages all over. This is their greatest fear because they had no organized group of men to protect the community which are majority small in size as compared to the Moros.

Alarm would rise up when nearby villages or signal from the outer part of the bay (Looc Bay is partly enclosed by land with an opening facing southwest) that strangers are coming (through large bancas which are called Vintas) fearing that those are Moros.

One early morning, a large fleet of Moro vintas was seen by the fisherfolks in the seashore who came from an overnight fishing at the bay. Panic drove the people to gather their important belongings and their children preparing to rush to the nearby hills. Some villagers rushed to the bay to validate the news and it was indeed correct that the fleet is on its way to their shoreline. Most of the folks were so terrified that they ran to the forest and small caves at the inland. Some stayed to protect their houses while praying to their deity.

The Moros were about to enter the enclosed bay when a genie of enormous size came out from the blue sky and stood with his legs spread across the bay (his right foot at the present-day Kawit point and the other leg at the present-day Agojo point). Everyone was awed of the scenario. Just when the vessels were so close as to be within the genie's reach, he stopped down and grabbed them one after the other throwing them away towards the other incoming vessels. He devoted most of his time, however, picking every Moro swimming for safety andchoking them one after the other.

The natives rejoiced. Their fears were gone. (However, it is not known how Talabukon was named or how they knew his name, but) his heroism was well spoken and immediately spread at the nearby villages. From that time on, the folks gather annually to celebrate as a thanksgiving for what Talabukon did for them. It is also not known if the genie interacted with people or was cited again after that day. As years go by, because of the villagers reverence to the mighty creature and due to the popular term in the locality on how they were saved agreed to call their place "Lo-oc" which in the native dialect means "choke."

Until today the place is called Looc, and footprints of Talabukon and are said to be found in Agojo and Kawit as a form of stone.

During the Looc Town Fiesta, streetdancing contest participated by almost all the barangays is held. Displaying dancing skills, artistic choreography, colorful costumes and props, replica of Talabukon and field demonstration/ re-enactment of the myth are the categories of the competition. Last 2001, Tribu Poblacion secured the first place. Baranggay Punta (Tribu Pontana) had three-peated the year after until 2004. Tribu Cadag-cadag dominated the contest years after. Annually, the three tribes would always either be the champions or runners up.
