= Lechon Festival =

Lechon Festival Parada ng Lechon
- Date: June 24
- Location: Balayan, Batangas
- Country: Philippines
- Major events: Street dancing, water dousing, lechon parade

The Lechon Festival (English: Parade of Roast Pigs; Filipino: Parada ng Lechon) is a religious and cultural festival in Balayan, Batangas, Philippines, held annually on June 24. The festival is celebrated in honor of St. John the Baptist. Numerous activities are performed, such as the lechon parade and water dousing.
