= Sangyaw =

Religious event in the Philippines

Coordinates: 11.2419°N 125.0077°E

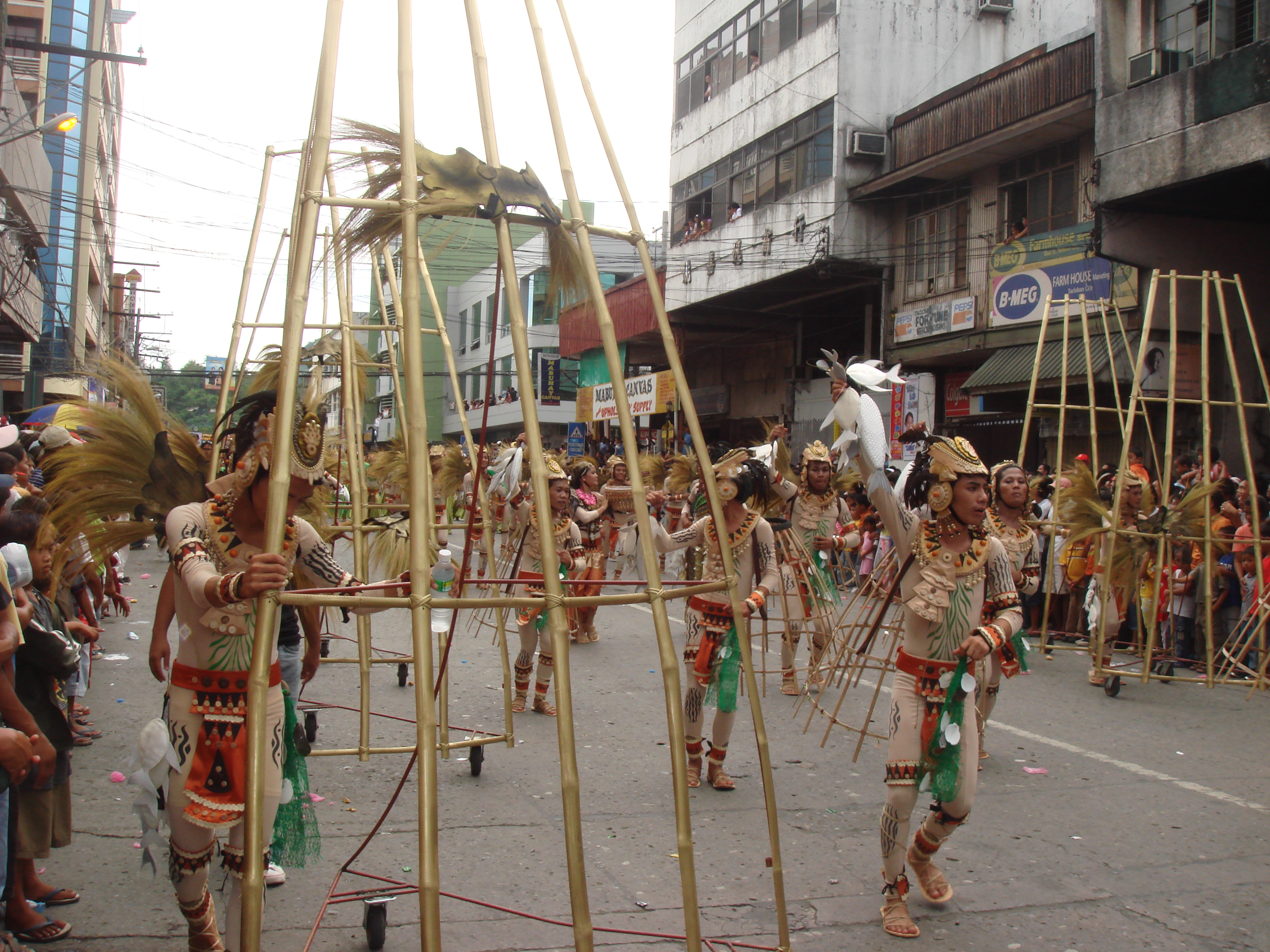
- Street dancing - considered the highlight of Sangyaw festival
- Genre: multi-event
- Frequency: annually
- Location: Tacloban
- Inaugurated: 1974
- Organiser: City Government of Tacloban and Sangyaw Foundation
- Website: http://sangyaw.tacloban.gov.ph

The "Sangyaw Festival" is an annual cultural and religious festival celebrated in Tacloban City, Leyte, Philippines. It is held in honor of the Santo Niño (Child Jesus) and highlights the traditions, history, and artistic heritage of the Waray people. The festival features street dancing, ritual performances, colorful costumes, and cultural presentations that showcase local identity and devotion. The term sangyaw comes from the Waray language, meaning “to proclaim” or “to announce,” reflecting the festival’s purpose of expressing faith and community pride.

== See also ==
- Pintados-Kasadyaan
