= Tuna Festival (Philippines) =

Annual festival celebrated in General Santos, Philippines

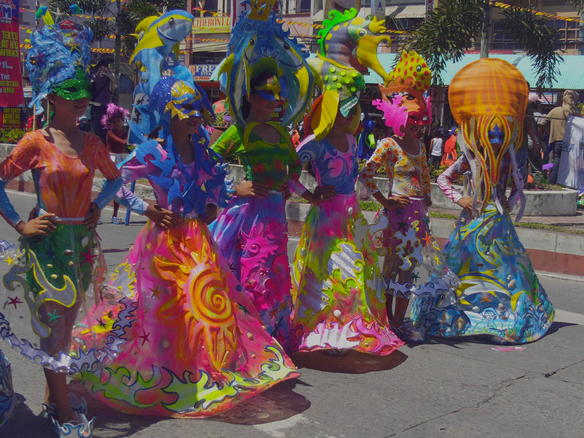
- Genre: Carnival, Parade, Street dancing
- Dates: First week of September
- Location: General Santos
- Years active: 1998 - present

Tuna Festival is a week-long, annual festival celebrated in General Santos, Philippines, in the first week of September of every year.

The fiesta features a colorfully tuna-themed designed float parade showcasing marine life, along General Santos City. The Pioneer Avenue ‘Sugbahan sa Dalan’ displays grilled tuna panga (tuna collar), prawns, and other seafood. Other events include the Tuna Culinary and Skills Olympics, food bazaars at Roxas East and Pendatun Avenues, the "Grand Fish Fest sa Fishport," the fastest tuna cleaner in "Linis Tuna", the mightiest fisherman in "Buhat Tuna" and heaviest tuna catch of 33.6 metric tonnes.

The Festival celebrated the 56th anniversary of its cityhood in 2024 with fireworks and celebrities. However the fisherfolk struggle with a meager percentage of their catch sold at high prices for sashimi.

== See also ==
- South Cotabato
- List of Philippine-related topics
