= Davao City Torotot Festival =

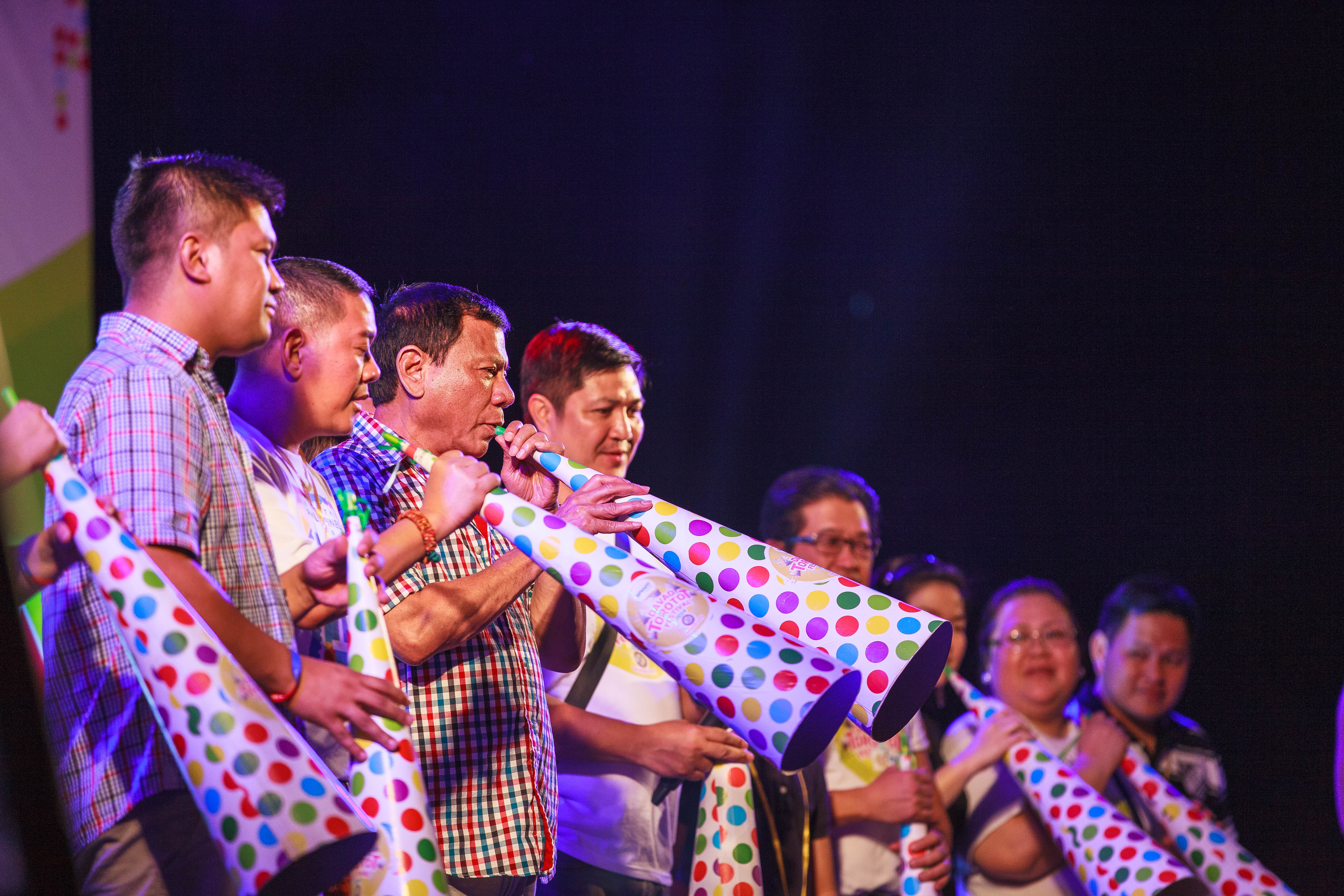
- 2015 festivities
- Official name: Torotot Festival
- Observed by: Davao City
- Significance: The final day and first day of the Gregorian year, Firecracker ban
- Celebrations: Blowing of party horns or torotot
- Begins: December 31
- Ends: January 1
- Frequency: annual
- First time: December 31, 2013 - January 1, 2014
- Related to: New Year's Eve

The Davao City Torotot Festival was a festival celebrated in Davao City every New Year's Eve which involves the blowing party horns, or what are more commonly known to Filipinos as torotots. It was first held during the city’s 2014 New Year’s eve celebration at the Freedom Park along Roxas Avenue from 1 pm on December 31, 2013 to 1 am on January 1, 2014. The first celebration of the annual festival was also an attempt of the city to break Japan's world record for the most people simultaneously blowing party horns

Event organizers City Government of Davao and Smart Communications expected an estimated number of 10,000 attendees to gather for the festival but official records tallied a total number of 7,568 people. Davao City beat the world record of 6,900 people set by Japan.

The Torotot Festival was organized in line with the city’s firecracker and pyrotechnic ban.

Currently, there were no mentions of the festival as a current event, suggesting it was discontinued or replaced, possibly within the broader scope of Davao City's annual Christmas celebrations, Pasko Fiesta sa Davao. As of 2025, the most recent New Year's Eve event in the city was in 2024-25 during Pasko Fiesta Grand Bazzar Year-End Countdown. The City Tourism had clarified that the Torotot Festival was organized by a private company and there were no plans to host the said festival.

== Background ==
=== Firecracker and pyrotechnic ban ===
The Davao City Council, under the leadership of then-Mayor Rodrigo Duterte, passed Ordinance 060-02, more commonly known as the firecracker ban, on October 15, 2002. The ordinance prohibits the manufacture, sale, distribution, possession, or use of firecrackers or pyrotechnic devices in the city.

Penalties for non-compliance of the ordinance are as follows: a fine of P1,000 or a 20- to 30-day imprisonment for the first offense, a fine of P3,000 or a one- to three-month imprisonment for the second offense or both, and a fine of P5,000 or a three- to six-month imprisonment or both for third and succeeding offenses. Business establishments will also suffer business permit cancellation on their third offense.

In the ordinance’s 12 years of implementation, Davao City has recorded five straight injury-free years, starting on the New Year’s eve of 2010.

== 2014 festival ==
=== Organizers ===
Telecommunications company Smart Communications partnered with the City Government of Davao in organizing the festival. To make the Torotot Festival possible, it provided free party horns to its subscribers. The provided party horns are machine readable for registration and official record-keeping.

Smart also gave out cash prizes to the villages with the most contingents and to the village with the most creative party horns. The village with most registrants received P50,000 while the winners of the most creative party horns were awarded P25,000 for the first prize, P15,000 for the second prize, and P10,000 for the third prize.

In the most creative party horns contest, Barangay Angliongto, Barangay 21-C, and Barangay Los Amigos won first, second, and third places, respectively. In the most contingents category, Barangay Communal, Barangay Buhangin, and Barangay Lapu-Lapu won first, second, and third places, respectively.

=== World record ===
Once officially validated and recognized by the Guinness Book of World Records, the Davao Torotot Festival will be the region’s second world record, next to the Monfort Bat Sanctuary’s record on being home to about 2.4 million Rousette fruit bats, the biggest colony of the fruit bat in the world. The Monfort Bat Sanctuary is in the Island Garden City of Samal.

== See also ==
- Kadayawan Festival
