= Marinduque State University =

Public university in Marinduque, Philippines

- Pamantasang Pampamahalaan ng Marinduque (Filipino)
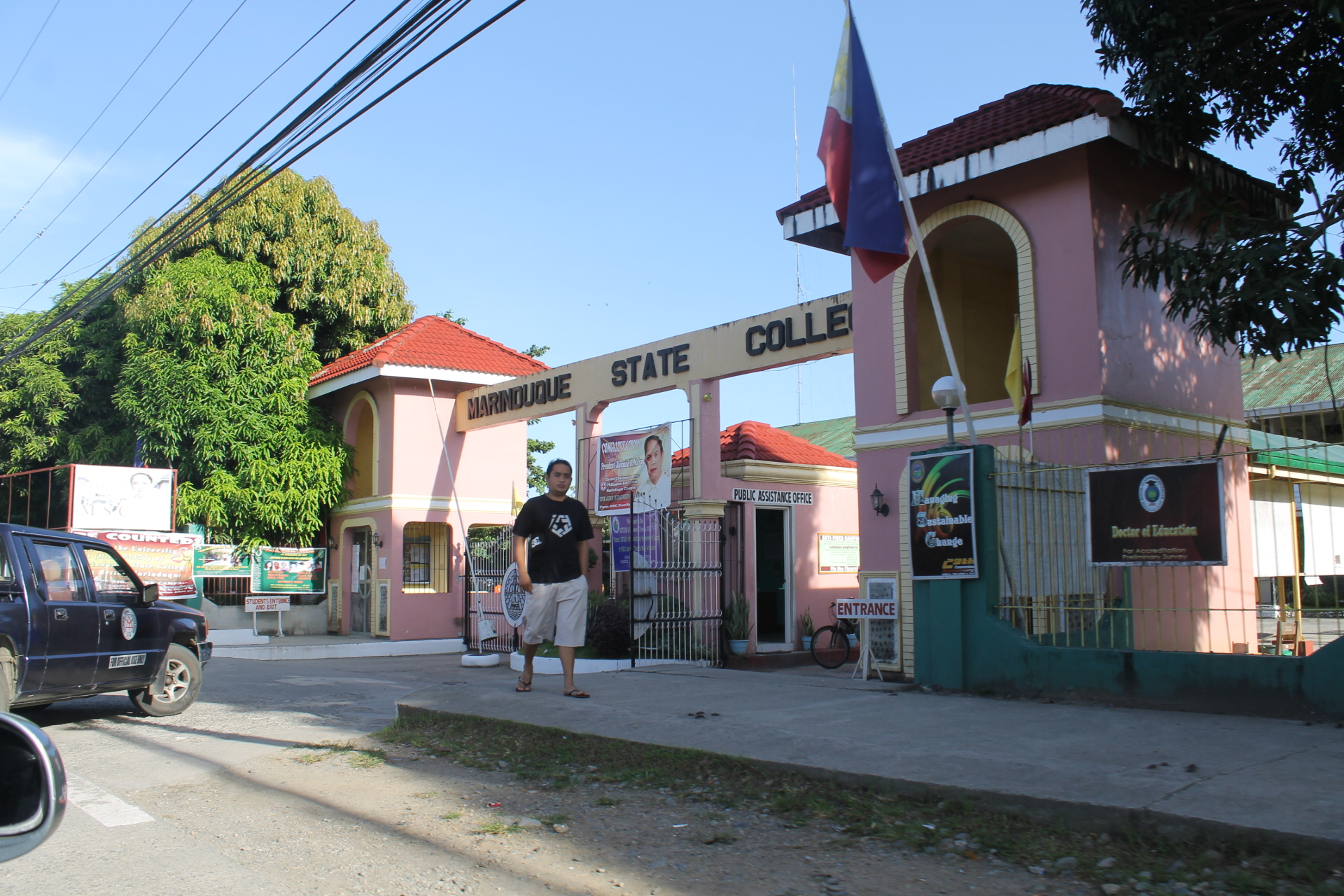
- The main gate of Marinduque State University
- Former names: Marinduque School of Arts and Trades (1952-1983); Marinduque Institute of Science and Technology (1983-1992); Marinduque State College (1992-2019)
- Motto: Build a brighter future with MarSU
- Established: 1952
- President: Dr. Diosdado P. Zulueta
- Vice-president: Atty. Crispin Francis M. Jandusay (Administration & Finance); Dr. Leodegario M. Jalos, Jr. (Academic Affairs); Dr. Ma. Edelwina M. Blase (Research, Extension & Training; Assoc. Prof. Marvin P. Plata (Student Affairs & Services)
- Location: Panfilo Manguera Sr. Rd., Tanza, Boac, Marinduque, 4900, Philippines; 13°27′14″N 121°50′41″E
- Colors: Maroon
- Sporting affiliations: SCUAA
- Website: marsu.edu.ph
- Location in Luzon Location in the Philippines
- Official logo of Marinduque State University

Marinduque State University (MarSU) is a public state university in the Philippines. Established in 1952, the college has a main campus on Boac and four branch campuses. The university offers undergraduate programs in Education, Engineering, Health Sciences, Information Technology, Industrial Technology, Agriculture, Fisheries, Business and Accountancy and Public Governance. For its graduate studies academic offering, it offers masters' and doctorate degrees in education.

Republic Act No. 11334 authored by former Congressman Lord Allan Jay Q. Velasco and approved by the Philippine government through the House of Representatives and bicameral committee, reinforced by the Commission on Higher Education (CHED) on April 26, 2019, converted Marinduque State College to Marinduque State University.

== Campus ==
Marinduque State University consists of one main campus located at Boac, (capital of Marinduque) and four more branches located at Mogpog, Sta. Cruz, Torrijos and Gasan.

The university provides a learning resource center (library and multimedia services), student publication, Office of the Student Affairs (OSA) student organizations and activities, Guidance and Psychological Testing Services, Health Services (Medical and Dental), Scholarship and Financial Assistance Program, and Sports, Physical Education and Recreation (SPEAR).

It has primary university services like a dormitory, internet networking, canopy and study sheds, bulletin boards, and a speech laboratory.

== History ==
The college was established in 1952 as the Marinduque School of Arts and Trades. An act in 1983 expanded its programs into Science and Technology, renaming it to Marinduque Institute of Science and Technology. The school was named a college in 1992, by a Republic Act that added Agriculture and Fisheries to its programs, as well as establishing its branch campuses.

In 2019, after the efforts of the faculty, students and all of its stakeholders through accreditation of each programs through Accrediting Agency of Chartered Colleges and Universities in the Philippines, Inc. (AACCUP) the College is formally inaugurated through legislature that it has been approved to be converted to a university.

== Academics ==
Marinduque State College has a variety of courses and it was divided by its campus branches to municipalities, such as Boac Campus, Sta. Cruz Campus, Gasan Campus, and Torrijos Campus. (except the municipalities of Buenavista and Buenavista). As of 2021, it has received certificates of compliance from the Commission on Higher Education Regional Office IV-B (CHEdRO–Mimamropa) for its academic programs.
