= Moriones Festival =

Lenten festival in Marinduque, Philippines

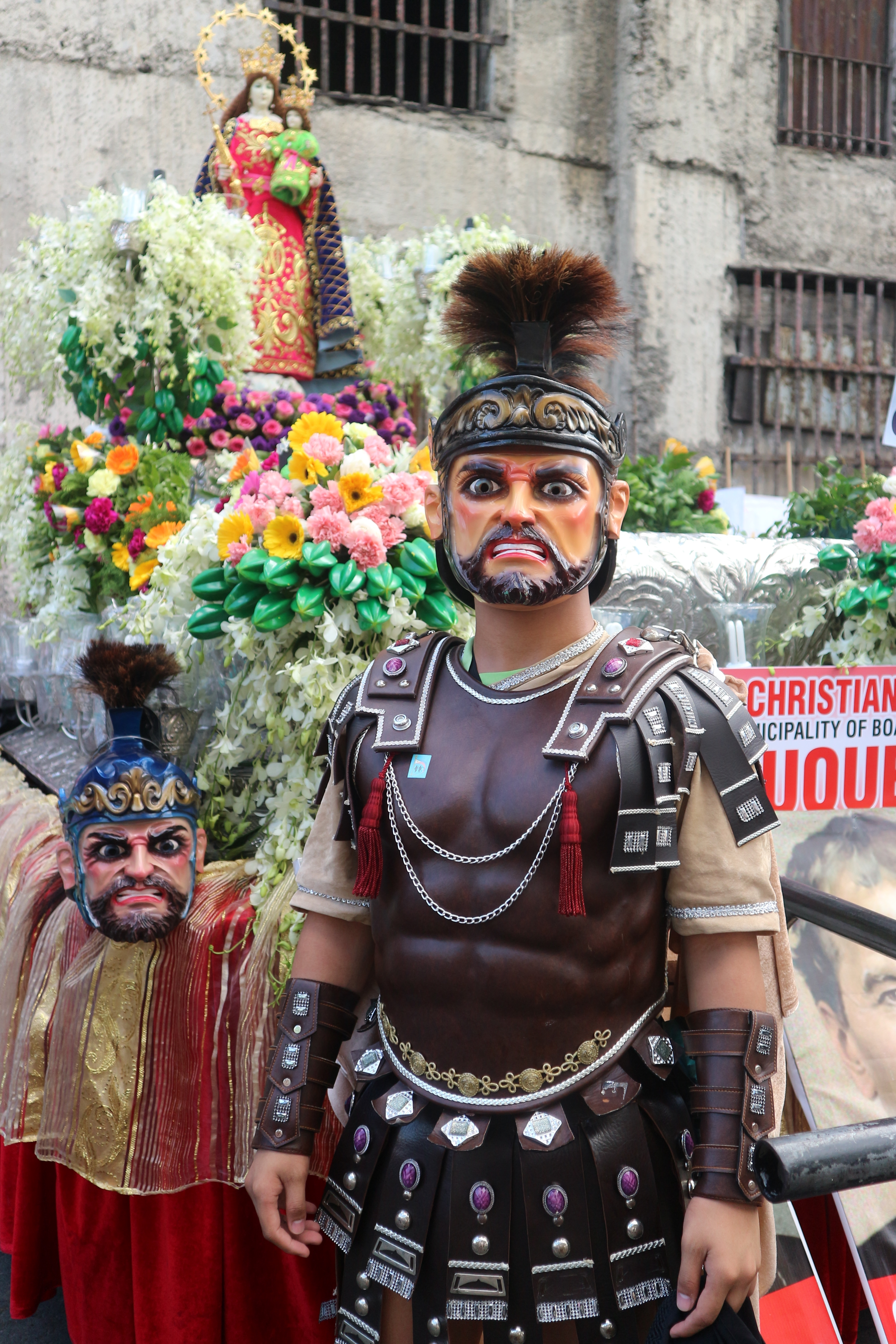
Moriones soldier

The Moriones Festival is a lenten and religious festival held annually on Holy Week on the island of Marinduque, Philippines. The "Moriones" are men and women in costumes and masks replicating the garb of biblical Imperial Roman soldiers as interpreted by locals. The Moriones tradition has inspired the creation of other festivals in the Philippines where cultural practices are turned into street festivals.

It is a colorful festival celebrated on the island of Marinduque in the Philippines. The participants use morion masks to depict the Roman soldiers and Syrian mercenaries within the story of the Passion of the Christ. The mask was named after the 16th and 17th century Morion helmet.

The Moriones refers to the masked and costumed penitents who march around the town for seven days searching for Longinus. Morions roam the streets in town from Holy Monday to Easter Sunday scaring the kids, or engaging in antics or surprises to draw attention. This is a folk-religious festival that re-enacts the story of Saint Longinus, a Roman centurion who was blind in one eye. The festival is characterized by colorful Roman costumes, painted masks and helmets, and brightly colored tunics. The towns of Boac, Gasan, Santa Cruz, Buenavista and Mogpog in the island of Marinduque become one gigantic stage. The observances form part of the Lenten celebrations of Marinduque. The various towns also hold the unique tradition of the pabasa or the recitation of Christ's passion in verse. Then at three o'clock on Good Friday afternoon, the Santo Sepulcro is observed, whereby old women exchange verses based on the Bible as they stand in wake of the dead Christ. One of the highlights of this festival is the Via Crucis, a re-enactment of the suffering of Christ on his way to Calvary. Men inflict suffering upon themselves by whipping their backs, carrying a wooden cross and sometimes even crucifixion. They see this act as their form of atonement for their sins. This weeklong celebration starts on Holy Monday and ends on Easter Sunday.

== Background ==
The term Moriones was concocted by the media in the 1960s, but local inhabitants have kept the original term as Moryonan. Many practitioners are farmers and fishermen that engage in this age-old tradition as a vow of penance or thanksgiving. Legend has it that Longinus pierced the side of the crucified Christ. The blood that spurted forth touched his blind eye and fully restored his sight. This miracle converted Longinus to Christianity and earned the ire of his fellow centurions. The re-enactment reaches its climax on Easter Sunday (or in other cases, Monday) when Longinus is caught and beheaded.

== History ==
In Valencia, Spain, there is a similar celebration called Festival de Moros y Cristianos (Moors and Christians Festival). It is almost certain that the word Moriones was derived from Moros. Another possible derivation is from the Spanish word "murió" (root verb: morir) meaning "(3rd person singular) died". The origin of the festival is traced to Mogpog and the year 1887 when Dionisio Santiago, the parish priest of said town, organized it for the first time.

== See also ==
- Holy Week in the Philippines
