= Boac =

Boac may refer to:

- Boac, Marinduque, a municipality in the central Philippines
- British Overseas Airways Corporation, abbreviated as BOAC, a former British state-owned airline
