= Boac Cathedral =

Roman Catholic church in Marinduque, Philippines

- Immaculate Conception Cathedral Parish; Parokyang Katedral ng Kalinis-linisang Paglilihi (Filipino); Diocesan Shrine of Mahal na Birhen ng Biglang Awa; Parroquia Catedral de la Inmaculada Concepción (Spanish)
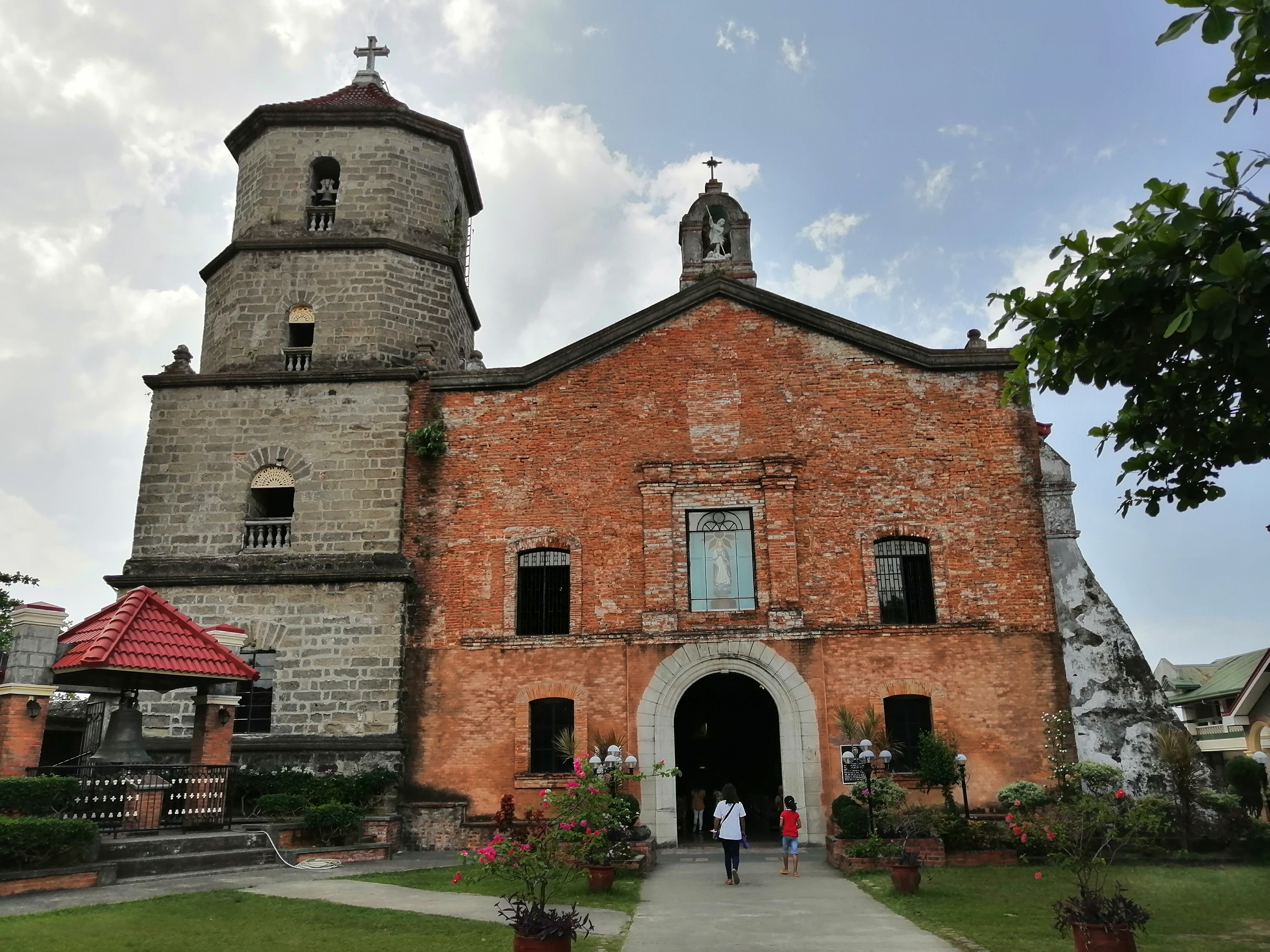
- Boac Cathedral in 2020

- Location within Luzon Location within Philippines
- 13°26′55″N 121°50′30″E
- Location: Boac, Marinduque
- Country: Philippines
- Denomination: Roman Catholic
- Website: https://www.facebook.com/icpboac/

History
- Status: Cathedral
- Founded: 1580, 1792
- Dedication: Immaculate Conception, Our Lady of Prompt Succor
- Dedicated: 1792

Architecture
- Functional status: Active
- Architectural type: Church building
- Style: Baroque, Fortress church

Administration
- Archdiocese: Lipa
- Diocese: Boac
- Deanery: Montserrat de Marinduque
- Parish: Immaculate Conception

Clergy
- Bishop: Edwin Panergo

The Immaculate Conception Cathedral Parish (Filipino: Parokyang Katedral ng Kalinis-linisang Paglilihi), commonly referred to as Boac Cathedral, is a Roman Catholic church and cathedral in the town center of Boac, Marinduque, in the Mimaropa region of the Philippines.

The seat of the Diocese of Boac, the cathedral today is surrounded by its likewise centuries-old defensive walls, and was declared a Important Cultural Property (ICP) in 2018 by the National Museum of the Philippines. At present, the Cathedral houses the Sacred Heart Pastoral Center (Bishop's residence) as well as the Diocesan Shrine of Mahal na Birhen ng Biglang Awa within its compound.

In 2021, the cathedral was designated as a jubilee church of the Diocese of Boac during the celebration of the 500 Years of Christianity in the Philippines.

== History ==
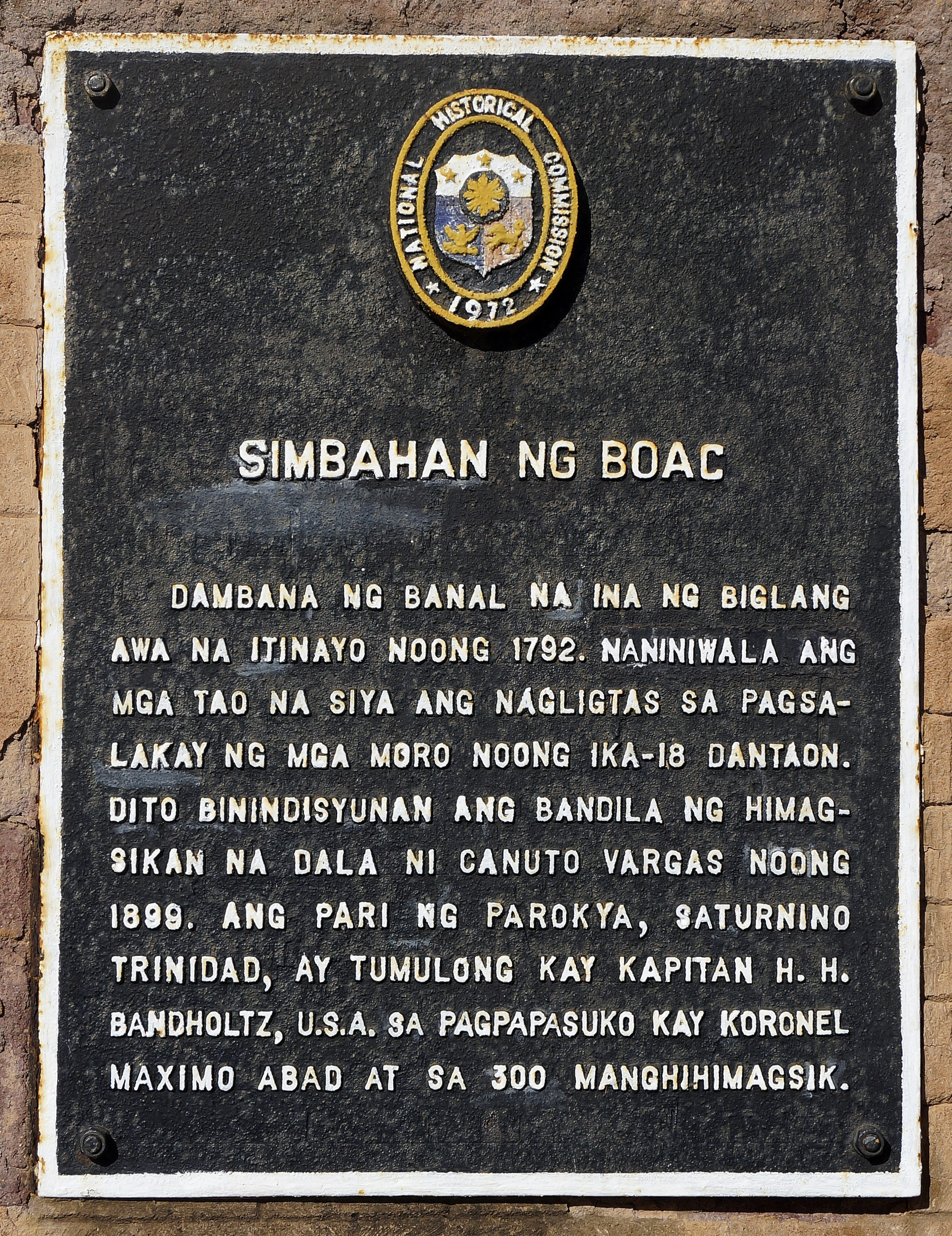
Church NHC historical marker

A Franciscan missionary, Fray Estevan Ortiz, planted the first cross on Marinduque island in 1579. Monserrat de Marinduque, the first visita, (now Boac), was established with Fray Alonzo Banol as its minister a year later in 1580.

The Franciscans ceded the administration of the island in 1618 to the Archbishop of Manila, Miguel García Serrano, who then entrusted the island to the Society of Jesus. In 1621, the Jesuits assumed the spiritual administration of the island. The church was constructed facing east with its rear overlooking the lower town, called labak by the natives, in 1756. It was seen to serve as a refuge of the townspeople against pirate attacks prevalent in the era, in addition to its purpose as a place for worship when it was finally built in 1792.

Local accounts include that once, when the townspeople were being attacked by Moro pirates, while taking refuge within the church's walls, they prayed fervently to their patroness, the Immaculate Conception, for salvation from the attack. Oral tradition also holds that while the natives were being killed, they are all praying when a supposed apparition of Mary with outstretched hands drove away the intruders. This event led to the devotion to Mahal na Birhen ng Biglang Awa (Our Lady of Prompt Succor) as their patroness's new title.

In 1899, the flag for the revolution in the Philippines brought by Canuto Vargas was blessed in the cathedral. in 1958, the venerated image of Mahal na Birhen ng Biglang Awa was canonically crowned and is considered as the patroness of the province. The historical marker installed at the cathedral states that a Boac parish priest named Saturnino Trinidad helped Colonel Maximo Abad surrender to the Americans under H.H. Bandholtz.

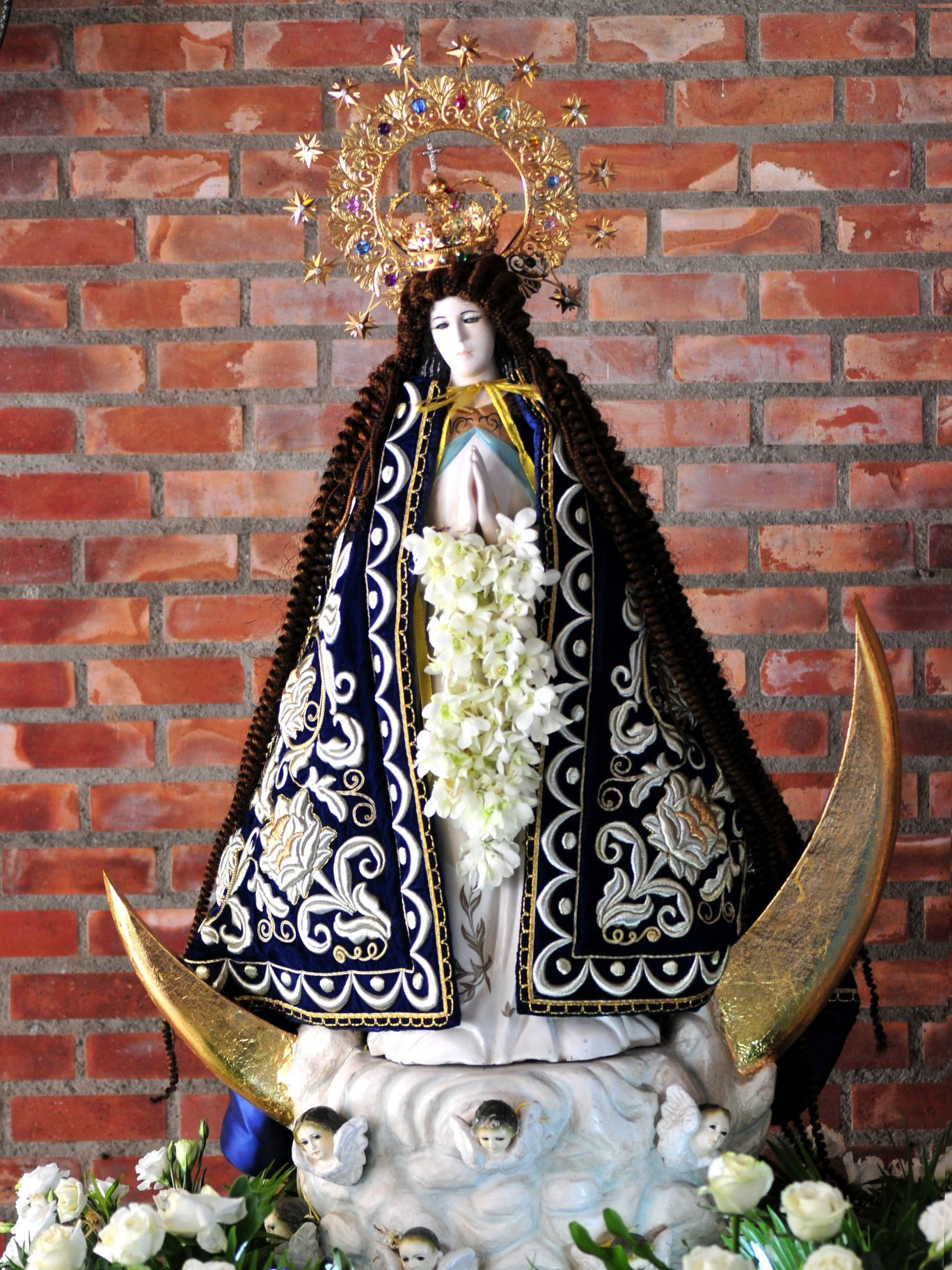
Image of Mahal na Birhen ng Biglang Awa, enshrined at the cathedral compound

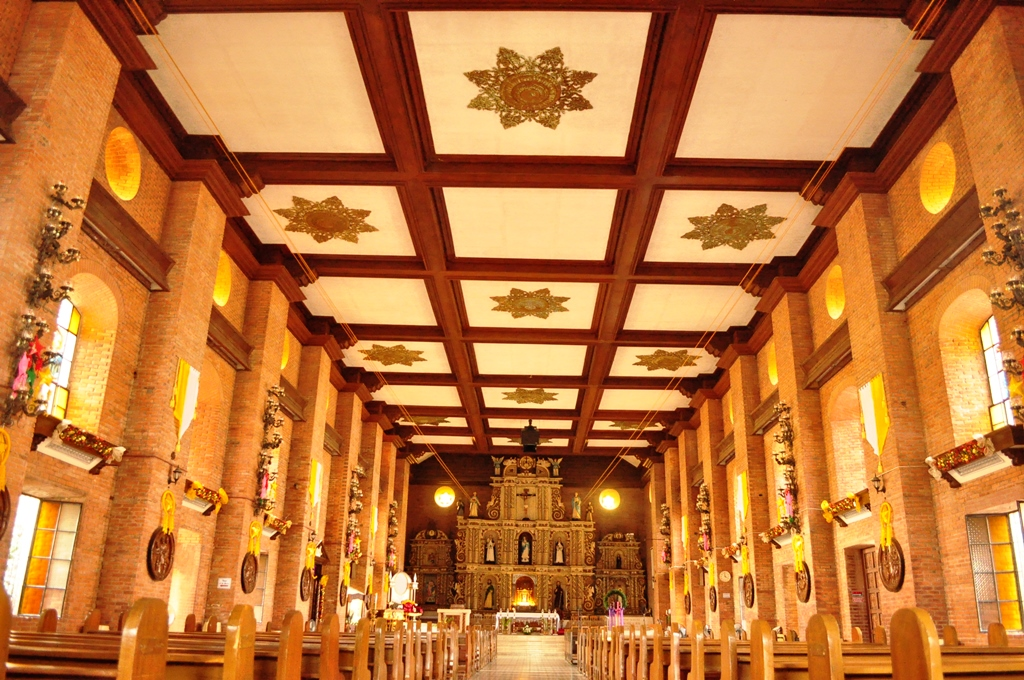
Cathedral interior in 2013

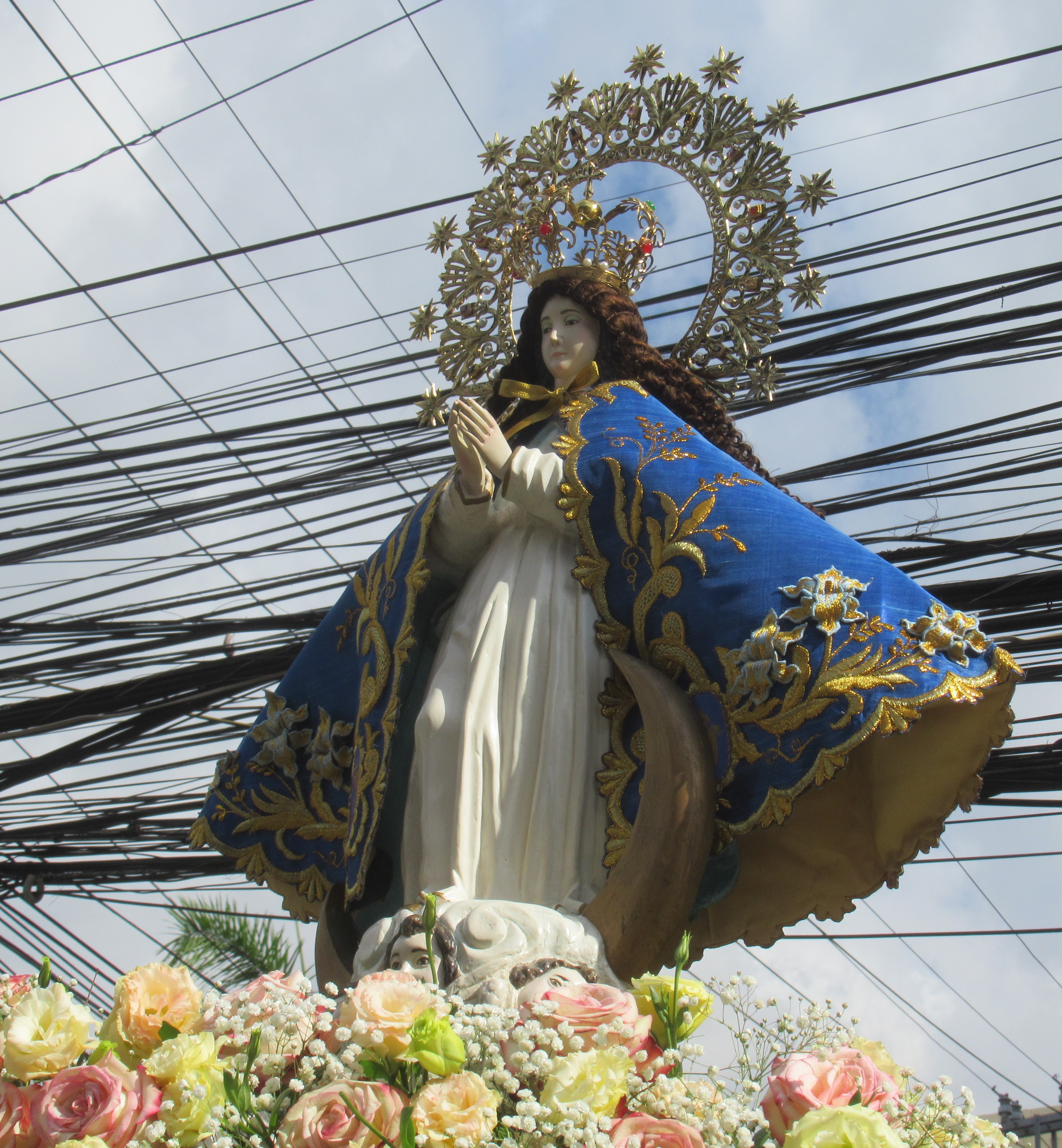
Mahal na Birhen ng Biglang Awa, Grand Marian Procession

== Current Clergy ==
- Bishop: Most. Rev. Bishop Edwin Panergo, D.D.
- Parish Priest: Rev. Fr. Ian Retardo
- Parochial Vicars: Rev. Fr. Tito Amodia, Rev Fr. Fabio Fiegalan, Rev Fr. Reynel Sajul, Rev.Fr. Louise Riego
- Resident Priest: Rev. Fr. Bienvenido Marticio

== Parish Priests ==
Name of Priest	Incumbency
Rev. Msgr. Senen Malapad	1984-1990
Rev. Fr. Simeon Reginio	1990-1991
Rev. Fr. Rene Labrador	1991-1995
Rev. Fr. Edwin Sager	1995-1996
Rev. Msgr. Ramon Magdurulang	1996-2002
Rev. Fr. Renato M. Sapungan	2002-2009
Rev. Fr. Elino P. Esplana	2009-2015
Rev. Fr. Eulogio Mangui	2015-2022
Rev. Fr. Ian Retardo	2022-present

== Diocesan Shrine of Mahal na Birhen ng Biglang Awa ==
The Diocesan Shrine of Mahal na Birhen ng Biglang Awa was established on May 10, 2008 (the feast day of her canonical coronation) by then-Bishop of Boac Reynaldo Evangelista and Cardinal Ricardo Vidal, Archbishop of Cebu.

The Shrine promotes the devotion to Mahal na Birhen ng Biglang Awa, the patron saint of the Diocese of Boac. It has mass every day, and a special healing mass is held every 11th of the month in the shrine. The shrine is also involved in a first saturday marian procession with the Cathedral.

Rectors of the Shrine of Mahal na Birhen ng Biglang Awa

- Rev. Fr. Pepito Perilla (2008-2010)
- Rev. Fr. Renato Sapungan (2010-2015)
- Rev. Fr. Senen Milambiling (2015-2019)
- Rev. Fr. Eulogio Mangui (2019-2022)
- Rev. Fr. Ian Retardo (2022-present)
