= Marinduque National High School =

Location
- Isok 1, Boac, Marinduque; Boac, Marinduque 4900; Philippines; 13.4456°N 121.8396°E

Information
- Other names: Duke High
- Former name: Marinduque Provincial High School
- Type: Public high school
- Established: 1914; 112 years ago
- School district: Boac North
- School code: 301554
- Principal: Nestor T. Rualo, Ed.D.
- Teaching staff: 300
- Grades: 7–12
- Enrollment: 5000+
- Campus size: 39.27 acres (15.89 ha)
- Colors: Maroon and Gold
- Newspaper: The Heart
- Yearbook: The Book of Names and Faces

Marinduque National High School or most commonly known as MNHS also Dukè High, is a public secondary school founded in 1914 located in Boac, Marinduque, in the Philippines.

== History ==
Marinduque National High School is formerly known as Marinduque Provincial High School, recognized as the first secondary school in the Province. It was established in the year 1914 by Municipal president Vicente Lardizabal Trivino, and served as the home of the Boac Boy Scout Trailers, one of the pioneer scouting units in the country organized on July 10, 1922, by Tenderfoot Scout Celso M. Mirafuente.

Parliamentary Bill No. 1328 on Marinduque Provincial High School's nationalization was signed into law, November 13, 1982, as Batas Pambansa Bilang 267. The school adopted its new name, Marinduque National High School (MNHS), in August 1984 when the first cash disbursement BCDC was released by the national government.

In response to a fire at the school, Governor Jose Antonio N. Carrion said in his 2009 State of the Province Address at the Capitol Session Hall, "We have secured funds from the DepEd in the amount of 10-million pesos for the construction of the two-storey Marinduque National High School building razed by fire in 2007. Phase 1 of the construction has been completed and Phase 2 is in progress. The new building is expected to be completed in time for the opening of the next school year."
