= Marinduque Academy =

Marinduque Academy Inc
- MARACA, M.A

Location
- Mogpog City Hall, Mogpog; 4901 Marinduque; Philippines
- Coordinates: 13.470139°N 121.849452°E

Information
- School type: Private high school
- Motto: "Home of The Great and The Wise"
- President: Misael Enrico L. Valdez
- Principal: Edna Carina V. Molbog
- Grades: 7–10 + 11-12
- Color: Navy Blue

Marinduque Academy Inc (Barangay Gitnang Bayan) is a non-sectarian private high school Located in the municipality of Mogpog, Marinduque,

The Marinduque Academy INC., affectionately called MA or MarAca, devotedly sends its personnel to local, regional and national seminars and trainings. Students compete in different fields whether regional or national. Faculty, student and curriculum development programs are prioritized Plan for continuous improvements and innovations are drafted to upgrade the school system.

== History ==
The Marinduque Acacdemy Inc. was founded on May 11, 1946, to offer Secondary Course of Instruction in Private Education to help the residents of the province especially those in the town of Mogpog who could not afford going to Manila and elsewhere. At the start, a special permit was given to offer first and second year levels. On June 11, 1949, the government permitted the school to offer complete four-year course in the High School.

== Education ==
The Marinduque Academy Inc provides secondary education, from grade 7 to 10, to elementary graduates and is one of the leading high schools of the province.

It consists of six levels, or largely based on the US school system. First year has six core subjects: mathematics, science, English, Filipino, computer (ICT). Second year has mathematics, science, English, Filipino, and world history. Third has elementary statistics, mathematics, science, Filipino, English, and technology livelihood education (TLE) and fourth year has trigonometry, physics, Filipino, English literature, technology livelihood education (TLE).

== Administration ==
- Misael Enrico L. Valdez (School President)
- Edna Carina V. Molbog (Principal)
- Dr. Anaville Lagran (Vice Principal and Head of Student Affairs)

== See also ==
- Education in the Philippines
