= Santa Cruz, Marinduque =

Municipality in Marinduque, Philippines

Santa Cruz
- Municipality
- Municipality of Santa Cruz
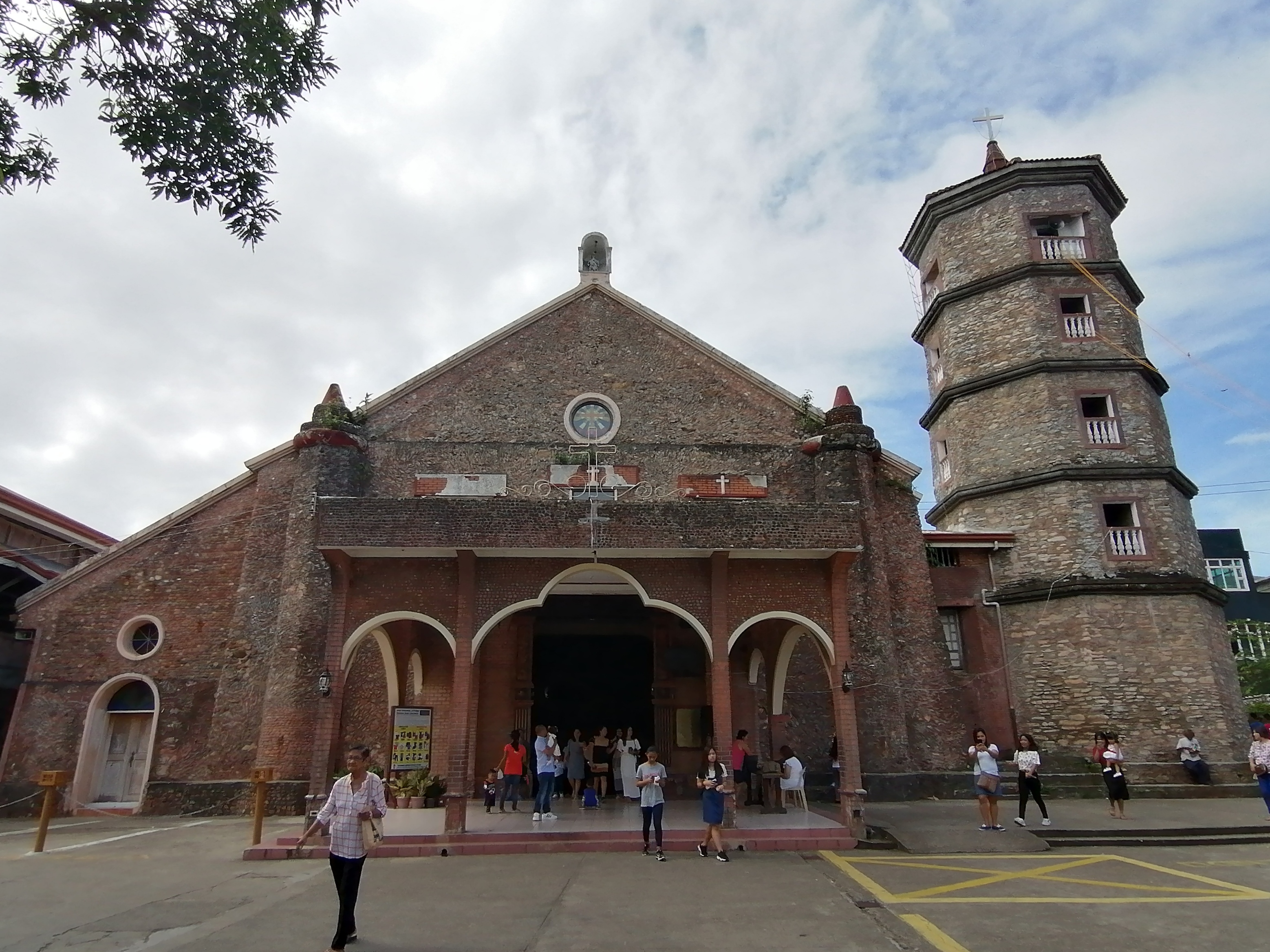
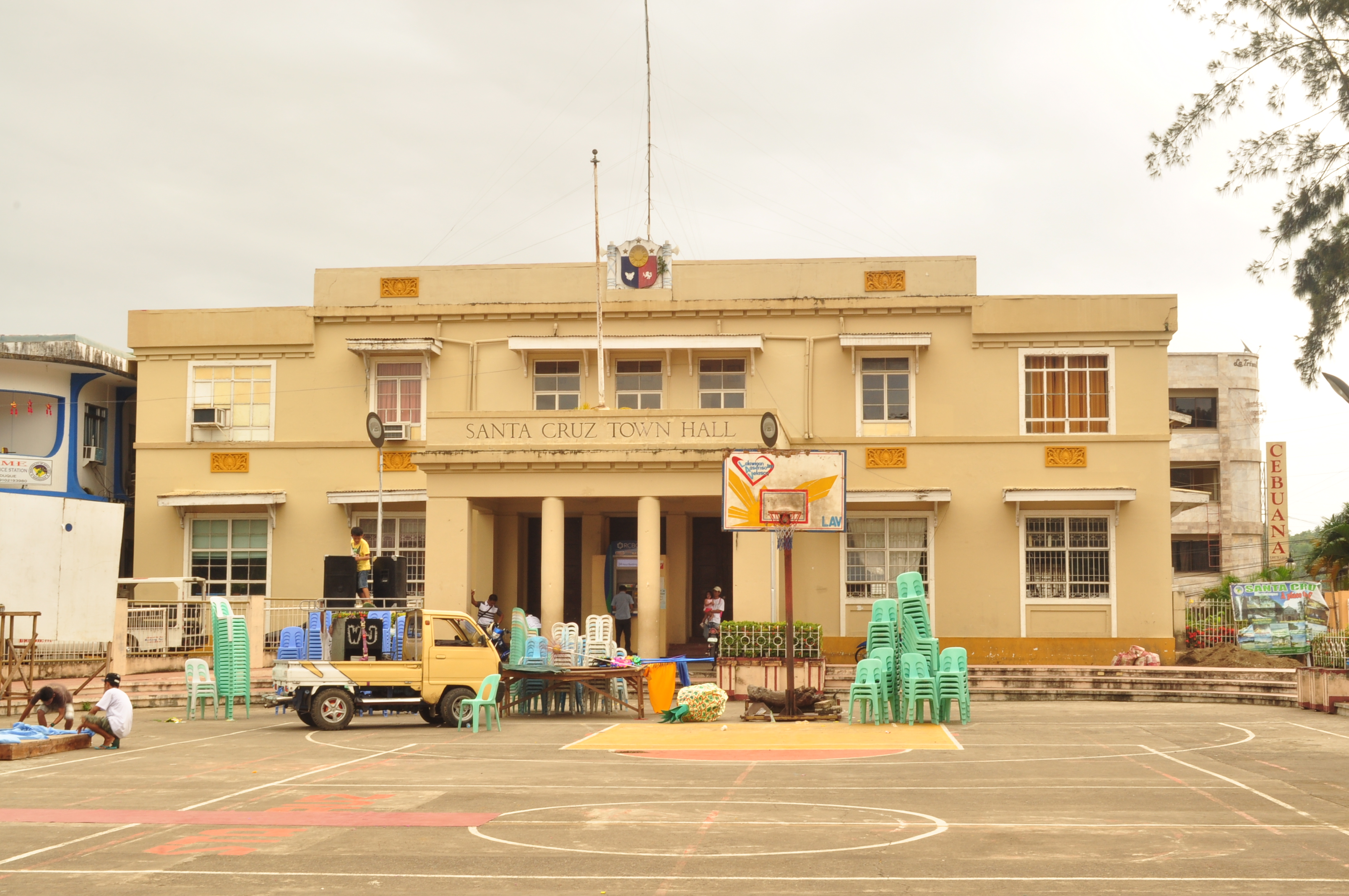
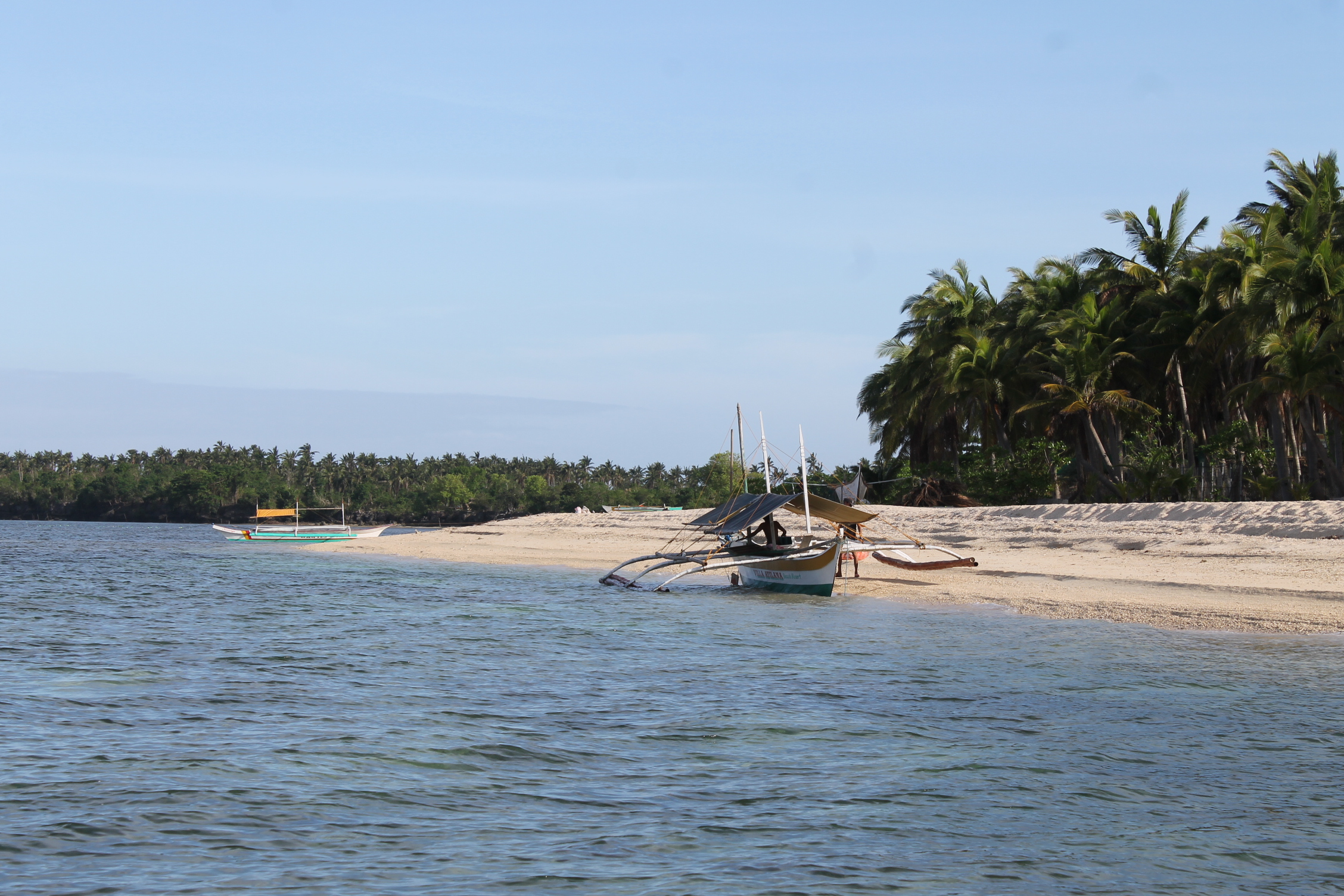
- Holy Cross Parish Church Municipal Hall Maniwaya Island

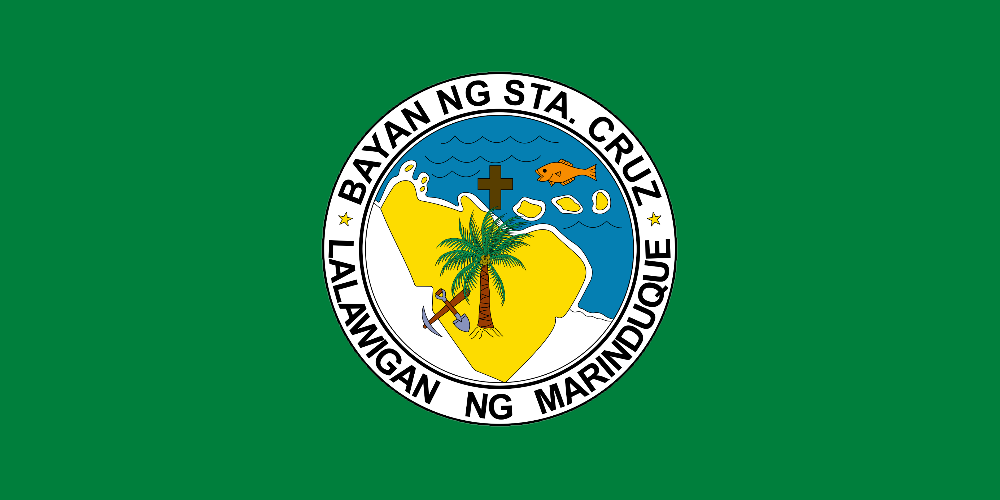
- Flag Seal

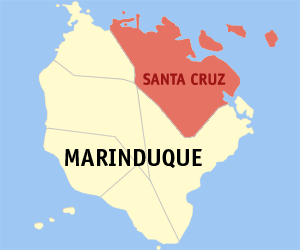
- Map of Marinduque with Santa Cruz highlighted
- Interactive map of Santa Cruz
- Location within the Philippines
- Coordinates: 13°29′N 122°02′E
- Country: Philippines
- Region: Mimaropa
- Province: Marinduque
- District: Lone district
- Founded: 1609
- Barangays: 55 (see Barangays)

Government
  - Type: Sangguniang Bayan
  - Mayor: Marissa Red-Martinez
  - Vice Mayor: Medwin R. Manuel
  - Representative: Reynaldo Salvacion
  - Municipal Council: Members: Sancho N. de la Rosa; Joam M. Morales; Krenessa P. Constantino; Amelia L. Aguirre; Danilo R. Red; Alejandro C. Palamos; Leonora F. Caraan; Erlando T. Nuñez
  - Electorate: 40,165 voters (2025)

Area
  - Total: 270.77 km^{2} (104.54 sq mi)
- Elevation: 131 m (430 ft)
- Highest elevation: 663 m (2,175 ft)
- Lowest elevation: 0 m (0 ft)

Population (2024 census)
  - Total: 51,594
  - Density: 190.55/km^{2} (493.51/sq mi)
  - Households: 14,358

Economy
  - Income class: 1st municipal income class
  - Poverty incidence: 14.19% (2023)
  - Revenue: ₱ 369.1 million (2024)
  - Assets: ₱ 821.1 million (2024)
  - Expenditure: ₱ 345.5 million (2024)
  - Liabilities: ₱ 244.4 million (2024)

Service provider
  - Electricity: Marinduque Electric Cooperative (MARELCO)
- Time zone: UTC+8 (PST)
- ZIP code: 4902
- PSGC: 1704005000
- IDD : area code: +63 (0)42
- Native languages: Tagalog

Santa Cruz, officially the Municipality of Santa Cruz (Tagalog: Bayan ng Santa Cruz), is a municipality in the province of Marinduque, Philippines. According to the 2024 census, it has a population of 51,594 people.

== History ==
Republic Act No. 204, approved on May 28, 1948, converted the sitios of Angas (from the barrio of Tagum), Biga (from Alobo), Kamandungan (from Lusok), Kilokilo (from San Antonio), and Makulapnit (from Devilla) into regular and independent barrios.

In 1953, the sitio of Baguidbirin was converted into a barrio.

== Geography ==
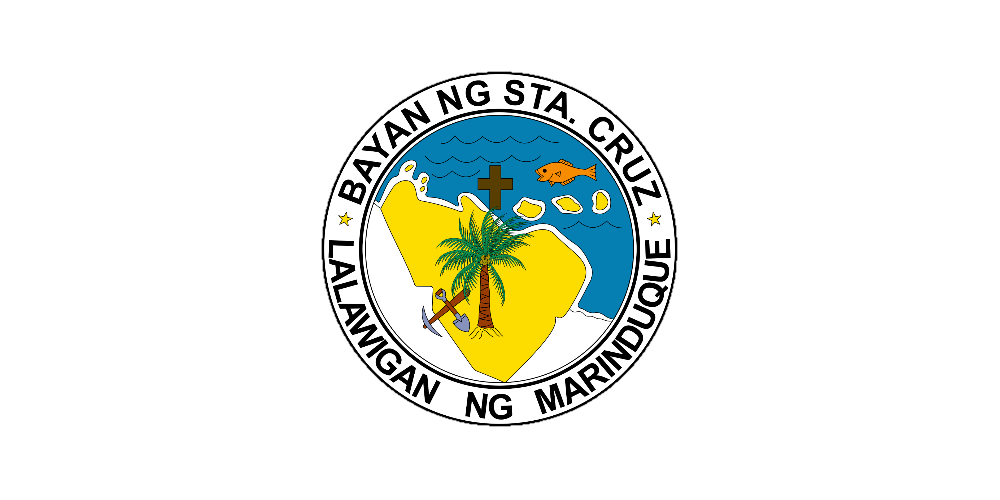
Former flag of Sta. Cruz

The municipal jurisdiction also includes the islands of Maniwaya, Mongpong, Salomague, and Santa Cruz (also known as Polo Island), as well as several minor islets. Santa Cruz is 29 kilometres (18 mi) from Boac.

=== Barangays ===
Santa Cruz is politically subdivided into 55 barangays. Each barangay consists of puroks and some have sitios.

In 1957 the sitio of Kalangkang, barrio of Kasily, was converted into a barangay.

- Alobo
- Angas
- Aturan
- Bagong Silang Pob. (2nd Zone)
- Baguidbirin
- Baliis
- Balogo
- Banahaw Pob. (3rd Zone Pob.)
- Bangcuangan
- Banogbog
- Biga
- Botilao
- Buyabod
- Dating Bayan
- Devilla
- Dolores
- Haguimit
- Hupi
- Ipil
- Jolo
- Kaganhao
- Kalangkang
- Kamandugan
- Kasily
- Kilo-kilo
- Kinyaman
- Labo
- Lamesa
- Landy(Perez)
- Lapu-lapu Pob. (5th Zone)
- Libjo
- Lipa
- Lusok
- Maharlika Pob. (1st Zone)
- Makulapnit
- Maniwaya
- Manlibunan
- Masaguisi
- Masalukot
- Matalaba
- Mongpong
- Morales
- Napo (Malabon)
- Pag-Asa Pob. (4th Zone)
- Pantayin
- Polo
- Pulong-Parang
- Punong
- San Antonio
- San Isidro
- Tagum
- Tamayo
- Tambangan
- Tawiran
- Taytay

=== Climate ===
Climate data for Santa Cruz, Marinduque
| Month | Jan | Feb | Mar | Apr | May | Jun | Jul | Aug | Sep | Oct | Nov | Dec | Year |
|---|---|---|---|---|---|---|---|---|---|---|---|---|---|
| Mean daily maximum °C (°F) | 27 (81) | 28 (82) | 30 (86) | 31 (88) | 31 (88) | 30 (86) | 29 (84) | 29 (84) | 29 (84) | 29 (84) | 28 (82) | 28 (82) | 29 (84) |
| Mean daily minimum °C (°F) | 21 (70) | 21 (70) | 21 (70) | 23 (73) | 24 (75) | 25 (77) | 24 (75) | 24 (75) | 24 (75) | 23 (73) | 23 (73) | 22 (72) | 23 (73) |
| Average precipitation mm (inches) | 31 (1.2) | 23 (0.9) | 25 (1.0) | 30 (1.2) | 85 (3.3) | 145 (5.7) | 182 (7.2) | 153 (6.0) | 172 (6.8) | 150 (5.9) | 113 (4.4) | 68 (2.7) | 1,177 (46.3) |
| Average rainy days | 11.3 | 8.5 | 9.7 | 11.3 | 18.3 | 23.2 | 26.6 | 25.4 | 25.9 | 24.2 | 19.7 | 15.2 | 219.3 |
Source: Meteoblue

== Demographics ==
Population census of Santa Cruz
| Year | Pop. | ±% p.a. |
|---|---|---|
| 1903 | 16,350 | — |
| 1918 | 16,681 | +0.13% |
| 1939 | 24,537 | +1.85% |
| 1948 | 27,430 | +1.25% |
| 1960 | 32,765 | +1.49% |
| 1970 | 41,300 | +2.34% |
| 1975 | 49,274 | +3.60% |
| 1980 | 51,846 | +1.02% |
| 1990 | 52,926 | +0.21% |
| 1995 | 56,991 | +1.40% |
| 2000 | 60,055 | +1.13% |
| 2007 | 61,322 | +0.29% |
| 2010 | 55,673 | −3.46% |
| 2015 | 56,408 | +0.25% |
| 2020 | 54,692 | −0.65% |
| 2024 | 51,594 | −1.39% |
Source: Philippine Statistics Authority

In the 2024 census, the population of Santa Cruz was 51,594 people, with a density of 190 inhabitants per square kilometre or 490 inhabitants per square mile.

== Economy ==
Poverty incidence of Santa Cruz (%)

Source: Philippine Statistics Authority

== Transportation ==
Access to the municipality:

- Via sea - Balanacan Port Mogpog (ferry coming from Lucena, ro/ro and fastcrafts) or a boat ride from General Luna, Quezon
- Via air - Marinduque Airport-(Cebu Pacific Operate by Cebgo) Starts Operation on April 1, 2019- Jeepney to Santa Cruz via Boac

== Education ==
There are three schools district offices which govern all educational institutions within the municipality. They oversee the management and operations of all private and public, from primary to secondary schools. These are the Santa Cruz North Schools District, Santa Cruz East Schools District, and Santa Cruz South Schools District.

=== Primary and elementary schools ===
- Alobo Elementary School
- Angas Elementary School
- Aturan Elementary School
- Baliis Elementary School
- Balogo Elementary School
- Bangcuangan Primary School
- Banogbog Elementary School
- Biga Elementary School
- Botilao Elementary School
- Buyabod Elementary School
- Dating Bayan Elementary School
- Devilla Elementary School
- Dolores Elementary School
- Escuela de Gratia Plena
- Gabaldon Elementary School
- Haguimit Elementary School
- Holy Infant Parochial School
- Hupi Elementary School
- Ipil Elementary School
- Kaganhao Elementary School
- Kalangkang Elementary School
- Kamandugan Elementary School
- Kasily Elementary School
- Kinyaman Elementary School
- Labo Elementary School
- Lamesa Elementary School
- Libjo Elementary School
- Lipa Elementary School
- Lusok Elementary School
- Makapuyat Elementary School
- Makulapnit Elementary School
- Maniwaya Elementary School
- Manlibunan Elementary School
- Marcopper Schools
- Masaguisi Elementary School
- Masalukot Elementary School
- Matalaba Elementary School
- Mongpong Elementary School
- Morales Elementary School
- Pansoy Elementary School
- Pantayin Elementary School
- Polo Elementary School
- Pulong Parang Elementary School
- Punong Elementary School
- Saint Joseph The Worker Academy
- San Antonio Elementary School
- San Isidro Elementary School
- Santa Cruz East Central School
- Santa Cruz Institute
- Santa Cruz North Central School
- Santa Cruz South Central School
- SCGC Learning Center
- Tagum Elementary School
- Tamayo Elementary School
- Tambangan Elementary School
- Tapian Elementary School
- Tawiran Elementary School
- Taytay Elementary School

=== Secondary schools ===
- Alobo National High School
- Botilao National High School
- Dolores National High School
- Hupi National High School
- Ipil National High School
- Kasily National High School
- Kilo-Kilo National High School
- Landy National High School
- Makapuyat National High School
- Makapuyat National High School (Masaguisi Annex)
- Malindig Institute Foundation
- Maniwaya National High School
- Matalaba National High School
- Mongpong National High School
- Polo National High School
- Punong National High School
- Santa Cruz Institute (Night High School)
- Tagum National High School
- Tambangan National High School

== Sister cities ==
- Valenzuela City, Philippines (2008)
- Virac, Catanduanes, Philippines (2008)
- Naval, Biliran, Philippines (2008)
- Jolo, Sulu, Philippines (2010)
- Basco, Batanes, Philippines (2010)
