= Boac, Marinduque =

Capital of Marinduque, Philippines

Boac
- Municipality
- Municipality of Boac
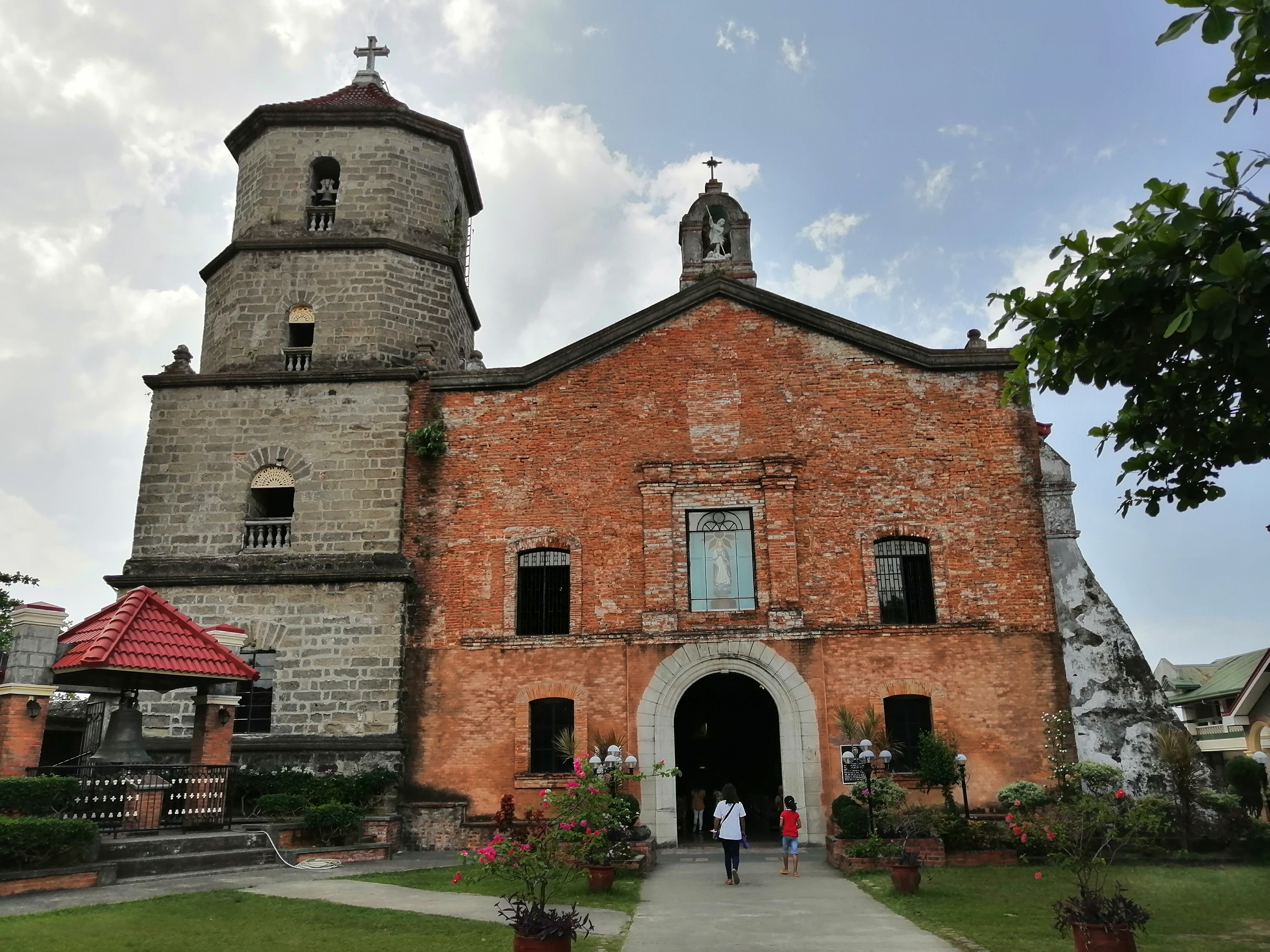
- Boac Cathedral and Fortress

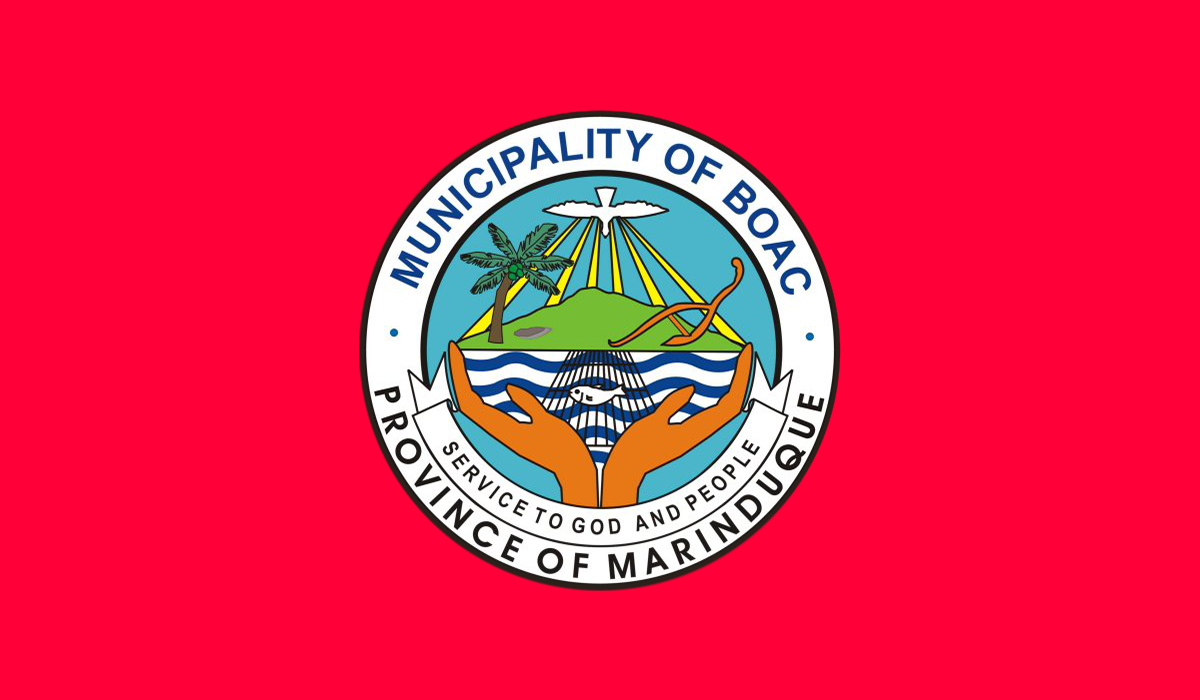
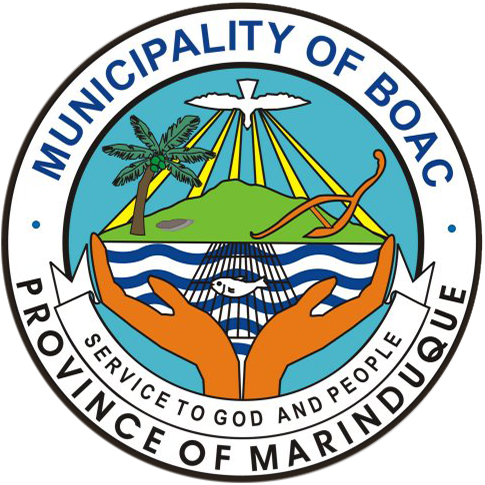
- Flag Seal
- Nicknames: Montserrat de Marinduque, Ang Bayang Biak
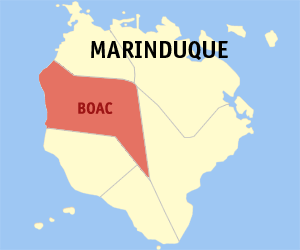
- Map of Marinduque with Boac highlighted
- Interactive map of Boac
- Location within the Philippines
- Coordinates: 13°27′N 121°50′E
- Country: Philippines
- Region: Mimaropa
- Province: Marinduque
- District: Lone district
- Founded: December 8, 1622
- Barangays: 61 (see Barangays)

Government
  - Type: Sangguniang Bayan
  - Mayor: Armi DC. Carrion
  - Vice Mayor: Mark Anthony E. Seño
  - Representative: Reynaldo Salvacion
  - Municipal Council: Members: Alejnic Andrew M. Solomon; Mark Angelo L. Jinang; Luisito S. Laylay; Gilmer R. Manguera; Justin Angelo J. Manrique; Francis DC. Jacinto; Wilson W. Mabute; Gelacio Raphael DC. Mascareñas; Donnah C. Miraflor; John Mark M. Jayag
  - Electorate: 38,627 voters (2025)

Area
  - Total: 212.70 km^{2} (82.12 sq mi)
- Elevation: 90 m (300 ft)
- Highest elevation: 1,103 m (3,619 ft)
- Lowest elevation: 0 m (0 ft)

Population (2024 census)
  - Total: 54,365
  - Density: 255.59/km^{2} (661.99/sq mi)
  - Households: 14,204
- Demonym: Boakeño

Economy
  - Income class: 1st municipal income class
  - Poverty incidence: 9.34% (2023)
  - Revenue: ₱ 345.8 million (2024)
  - Assets: ₱ 1,101 million (2024)
  - Expenditure: ₱ 269.5 million (2024)
  - Liabilities: ₱ 258.7 million (2024)

Service provider
  - Electricity: Marinduque Electric Cooperative (MARELCO)
- Time zone: UTC+8 (PST)
- ZIP code: 4900
- PSGC: 1704001000
- IDD : area code: +63 (0)42
- Native languages: Tagalog
- Website: www.boac.gov.ph

Boac, officially the Municipality of Boac (Tagalog: Bayan ng Boac), is a municipality and capital of the province of Marinduque, Philippines. According to the 2024 census, it has a population of 54,365 people.

Situated in the western coast of Marinduque island, the municipality is bordered in the north by the municipality of Mogpog, in the west by the Tayabas Bay and Sibuyan Sea, in the east by the municipality of Torrijos, and in the south by the municipalities of Gasan and Buenavista.

Boac, a heritage town in its own right, is known as one of the main venues of the annual Moriones Festival and is the location of a number of historical sites in Marinduque including the Boac Cathedral fortress church, Casa Real and the Liwasan ng Kalayaan, Laylay Port, and the Battle of Paye site. The municipality is also home to the Marinduque Branch of the National Museum of the Philippines.

== Etymology ==
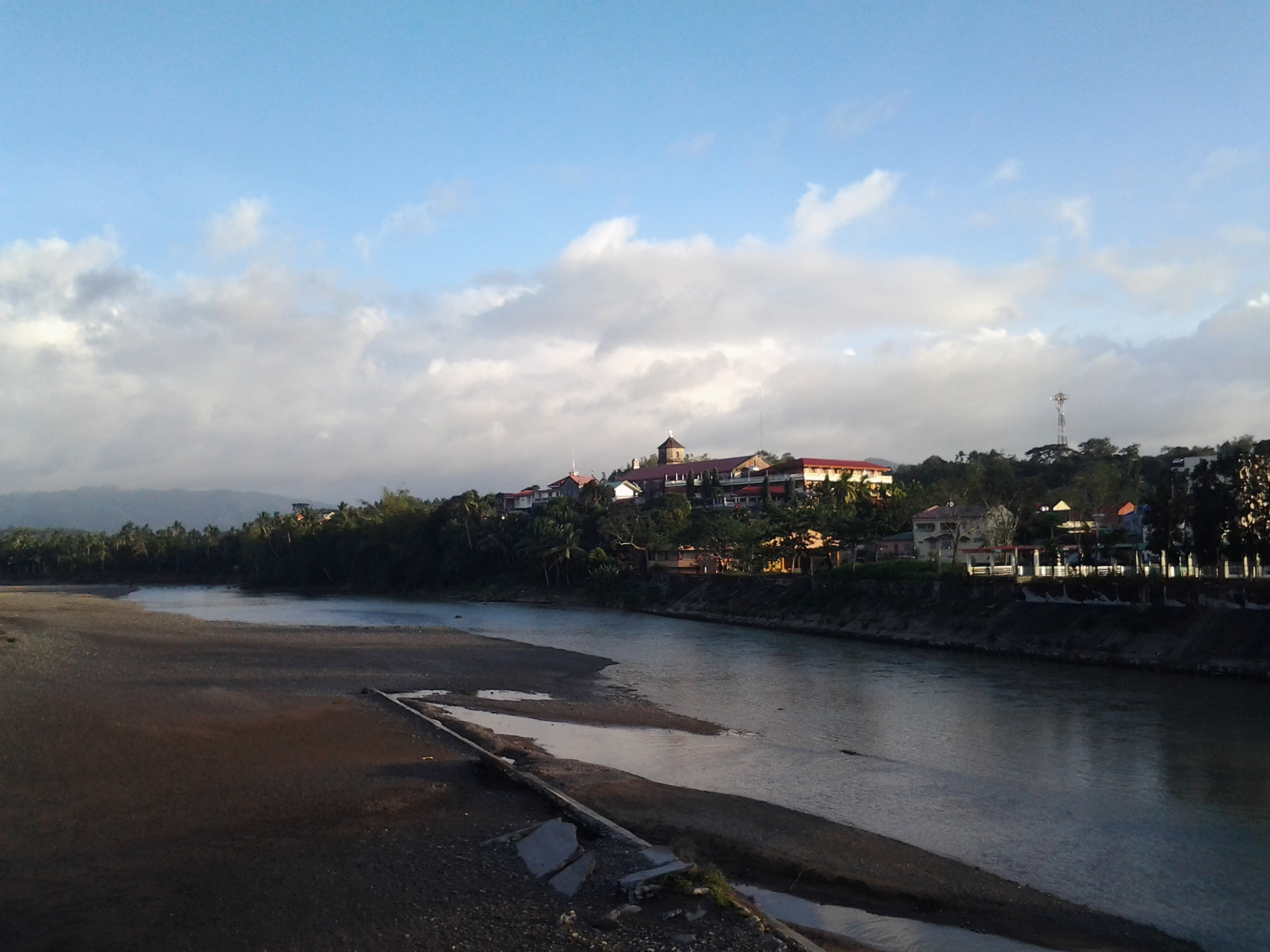
Boac town proper overlooking the Boac River

The toponym Boac is derived from the Cebuano word bu-ak, cognatic to the Tagalog word bi-ak and the southern Tagalog term ba-ak. This is in reference to the town being bisected by the Boac River which runs from the Central Marinduque and Balagbag Mountain Ranges to the west coast facing the Tayabas Bay. Other references suggest that the name Boac is derived from the Tagalog term bulwak referring to the gush of water at the estuaries and mouth of the Boac River.

=== Other names ===
During the Spanish colonization, the first visita called Montserrat de Marinduque was established in the island in 1580 in what is now Boac.

== History ==
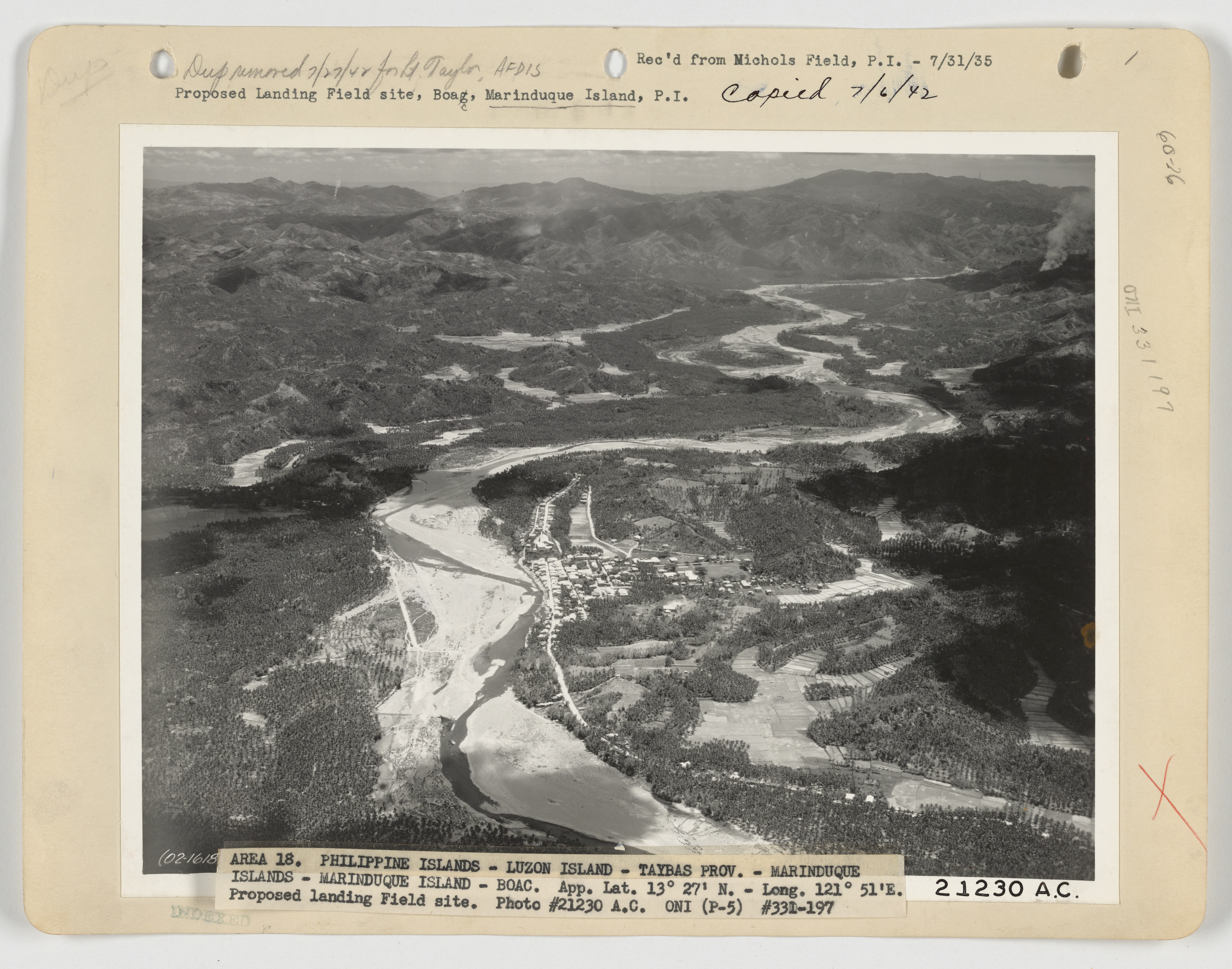
Aerial view of Boac, 1935

In the early years of Spanish colonization in Marinduque, it was first mentioned in Miguel de Loarca's Relacion de las Yslas Filipinas (1582-1583) that the natives of the island are Pintados or tattooed people resembling those from the Camarines Provinces and the Visayan Islands.

In 1580, the first visita was established in the island of Marinduque and was called Montserrat de Marinduque in what is now the municipality of Boac; this visita was governed by Fray Alonzo Banol as minister.

In 1621, Spanish Jesuit missionaries brought a three-foot Marian image to Boac which will later be known as the Mahal na Ina ng Biglang Awa. Notorious for their sea raids, a group of Muslim pirates from the southern Philippines sieged Boac in the mid-17th century along the shores of Laylay and eventually into the Poblacion located along the Boac River. In panic, the locals took refuge in the fortress church of Boac as able-bodied men defended the outer walls against the attacks. Many locals were killed and, by the third day of siege, the surviving locals began to run short on food and the capture of the fortress became imminent. As an act of faith, the survivors prayed fervently at the throne of Mary, asking her to deliver them from these enemies. According to legends, a very strong storm with torrential rain, thunder, and lightning engulfed the area and at its very height, it was reported that the image of a beautiful lady with outstretched arms appeared standing on the top of the fortress wall. Terrorized, the pirates fled in confusion to their vintas and left the island. Since then, the image of Mary has been honoured and given the title "Biglang Awa." To commemorate this miracle, the old image brought by the Jesuits in Boac was placed in a shrine erected on the portion of the wall where Mary is said to have appeared.

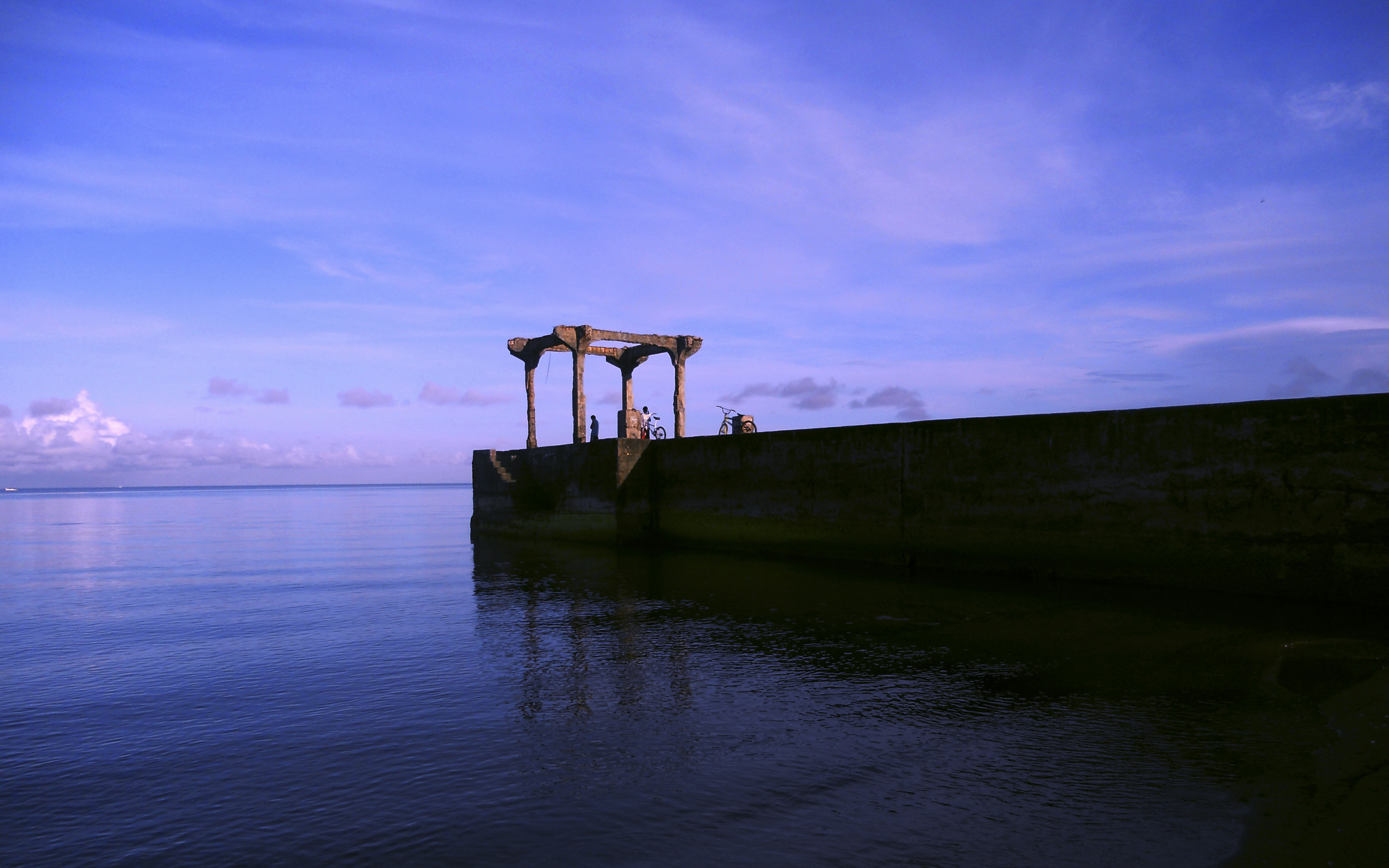
Laylay Port

In 1942, Boac was occupied by Japanese troops. In 1945, the Battle of Marinduque began and the American-Philippine Commonwealth troops landed in Boac after the war was built of the general headquarters of the Philippine Commonwealth Army and Philippine Constabulary from 1945 to 1946 station in this municipality.

The 1818 Spanish census, showed that Boac had 1,908 native families and 31 Spanish-Filipino families.

The Provincial Government of Marinduque under Gov. Carmencita O. Reyes built a larger-than-life-size image of the Our Lady of Biglang Awa in cement and placed in the seashore in Balanacan Port to welcome travelers to the island.

On May 10, 2008, the Diocese of Boac celebrated the 50th anniversary and the golden anniversary of the Canonical coronation of Mahal na Birhen ng Biglang-Awa (1958–2008). Cebu Archbishop-Cardinal Ricardo Vidal of Mogpog, Marinduque, officiated at the consecrated mass.

== Geography ==
Boac is the third largest of the six municipalities of the province of Marinduque, after Santa Cruz and Torrijos. It borders all the municipalities of the province: Mogpog to the north, Santa Cruz to the Northeast, Torrijos to the East, Buenavista to the South and Gasan to the South Southwest.

The municipality is generally hilly, rugged and mountainous in the south and eastern part with thin strips of flat and farm lands and long shoreline in the west. The longest and largest river, Boac River, which gets its source in the mountainous forest in the extreme southwest and spills off to the northern shore of Boac, divides the municipality into two geographical areas: north and south.

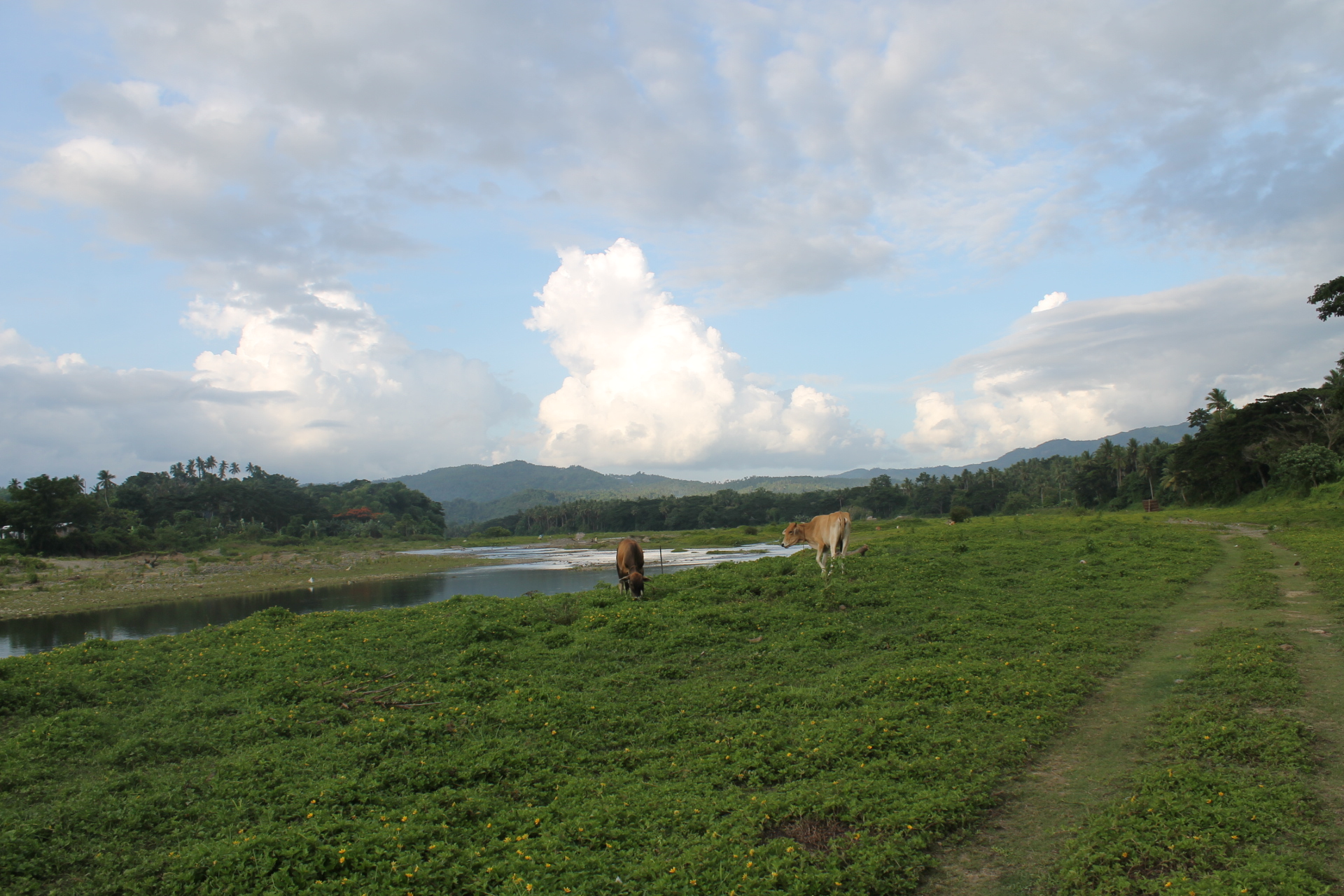
The Boac River in Tumapon

The closest town-to-town reference to Boac is the municipality of Mogpog which is approximately 5 kilometers. Boac is connected to Mogpog and Gasan by the Marinduque Circumferential Highway or the Pan-Marinduque Highway. Two bridges connect the north and south area of the municipality: the narrow Tabi Bridge which connects Barangay Tabi and Barangay San Miguel and the said-to-be the longest bridge in the province, Biglang Awa Bridge (186m), which connects Barangay Tampus and Barangay Bantad. A narrow minor road connects Boac and Mogpog via Buliasnin-Nangka Road, and Boac and Gasan via Duyay-Tapuyan Trail. Boac has a total road network of 117.61 kilometers.

Geopolitically, Boac is divided into six zones: Poblacion, Riverside, Ilaya I, Ilaya II, Seaside A and Seaside B. Boac's geographical center is roughly located between the border of Barangay Binunga and Barangay Can-at.

Boac is home to most of the province's commercial businesses. Barangays San Miguel, Murallon, and Mercado are the town's business district where the public market, medium-rise buildings, sports arena and Boac Town Arena, now Moriones Arena are. Meanwhile, Barangay Isok is home to the town's education district. Marinduque National High School, St. Mary's College of Marinduque, Don Luis Hidalgo Memorial School, Barangay Day Care Centers, Boac North District Office and the Division of Marinduque DepED Office is in Barangay Isok. The Municipal Building Hall is at Barangay Tampus, adjacent is the Marinduque Museum at Barangay Malusak.

The Marinduque Provincial Capitol is in Barangay Santol near the Dr. Damian Reyes Memorial Hospital (formerly Marinduque Provincial Hospital) and Camp Maximo Abad.

=== Barangays ===
Boac is politically divided into 61 barangays. Each barangay consists of puroks and some have sitios.

- Agot
- Agumaymayan
- Amoingon
- Apitong
- Balagasan
- Balaring
- Balimbing
- Balogo
- Bamban
- Bangbangalon
- Bantad
- Bantay
- Bayuti
- Binunga
- Boi
- Boton
- Buliasnin
- Bunganay
- Caganhao
- Canat
- Catubugan
- Cawit
- Daig
- Daypay
- Duyay
- Hinapulan
- Ihatub
- Isok 1 (Poblacion)
- Isok 2 (Poblacion)
- Laylay
- Lupac
- Mahinhin
- Mainit
- Malbog
- Maligaya
- Malusak (Poblacion)
- Mansiwat
- Mataas na Bayan (Poblacion)
- Maybo
- Mercado (Poblacion)
- Murallon (Poblacion)
- Ogbac
- Pawa
- Pili
- Poctoy
- Poras
- Putting Buhangin
- Puyog
- Sabong
- San Miguel (Poblacion)
- Santol
- Sawi
- Tabi
- Tabigue
- Tagwak
- Tambunan
- Tampus (Poblacion)
- Tanza
- Tugos
- Tumagabok
- Tumapon

=== Climate ===
Climate data for Boac, Marinduque
Month	Jan	Feb	Mar	Apr	May	Jun	Jul	Aug	Sep	Oct	Nov	Dec	Year
Mean daily maximum °C (°F)	26 (79)	27 (81)	29 (84)	31 (88)	30 (86)	30 (86)	29 (84)	29 (84)	29 (84)	29 (84)	28 (82)	26 (79)	29 (83)
Mean daily minimum °C (°F)	22 (72)	22 (72)	22 (72)	23 (73)	24 (75)	24 (75)	24 (75)	24 (75)	24 (75)	24 (75)	23 (73)	23 (73)	23 (74)
Average precipitation mm (inches)	83 (3.3)	55 (2.2)	44 (1.7)	37 (1.5)	90 (3.5)	123 (4.8)	145 (5.7)	125 (4.9)	135 (5.3)	166 (6.5)	163 (6.4)	152 (6.0)	1,318 (51.8)
Average rainy days	15.1	10.8	11.9	11.4	19.9	23.7	26.3	23.9	23.9	22.1	20.2	18.6	227.8
Source: Meteoblue

== Demographics ==
Population census of Boac
Year	Pop.	±% p.a.
1903	15,823	—
1918	17,656	+0.73%
1939	20,977	+0.82%
1948	19,687	−0.70%
1960	26,712	+2.58%
1970	32,402	+1.95%
1975	35,649	+1.93%
1980	37,005	+0.75%
1990	41,034	+1.04%
1995	44,609	+1.58%
2000	48,504	+1.81%
2007	50,823	+0.65%
2010	52,892	+1.46%
2015	54,730	+0.65%
2020	57,283	+0.96%
2024	54,365	−1.25%
Source: Philippine Statistics Authority

According to the 2024 census, the population of Boac is 54,365 people, with a population density of 260 people per square kilometer. The most densely populated areas are in the Poblacion, northwest, and southwest barangays. Barangays in the eastern portions of the municipality are generally sparsely populated. Approximately 70% of the population lives along the national highways or within 5 kilometres (3.1 mi) from the national road. Furthermore, approximately 5% of the total population lives in the town proper and 10% lives in the sub-urban barangays.

=== Religious Institutions ===
- The Roman Catholic Diocese of Boac
- Assemblies of God
- Boac UNIDA Church
- Boac Gospel Church
- IRM Evangelical Church
- Jesus the Lord of Lords Church
- Potter's House Christian Fellowship
- Iglesia ni Cristo
- Jehovah's Witnesses

== Economy ==
Poverty incidence of Boac (%)

Source: Philippine Statistics Authority

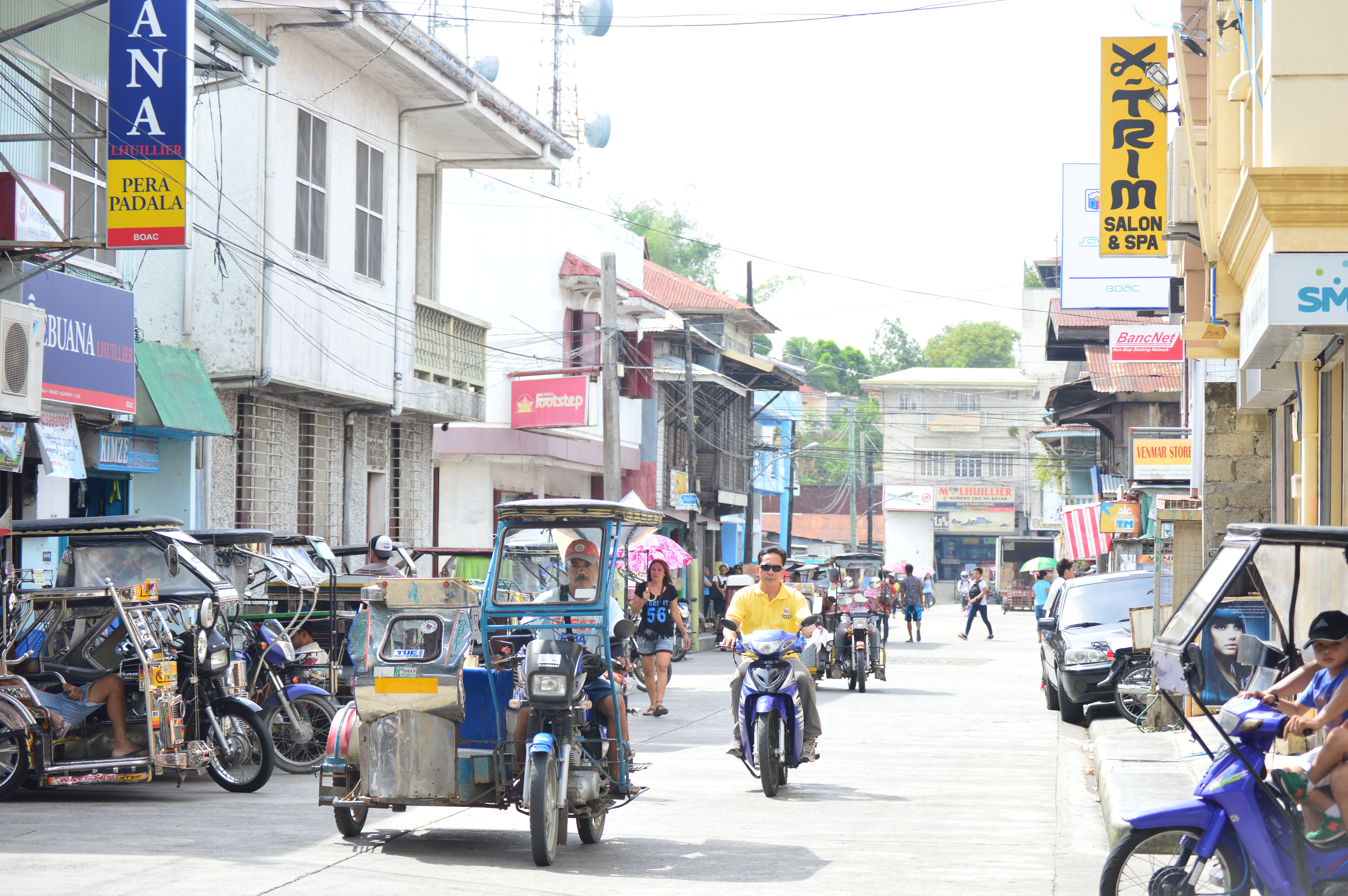
Boac Business District view from Mercader Street

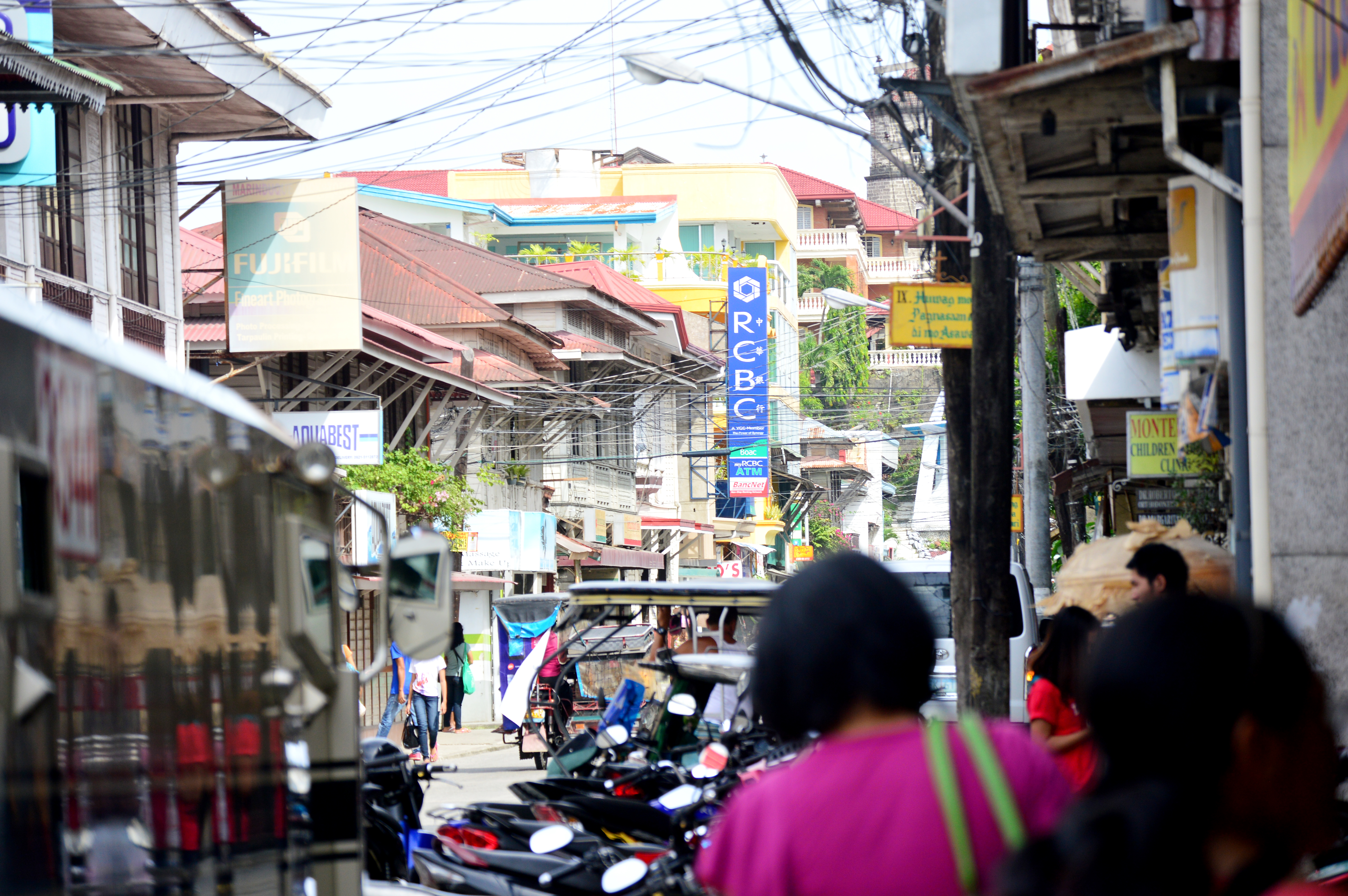
Boac Business District view from Gov. D. Reyes Street

Located in the town center, the Boac Public Market is one of the municipality’s key landmarks. Vendors offer both dry and wet goods within four air-conditioned buildings, while nearby transport terminals facilitate the distribution of products to other barangays. It is often regarded as the province’s “mini-supermarket.”

The poblacion area is referred to as the Boac Central Business District (BCBD). At its core is a newly constructed two-storey town market housing approximately 100 stalls.

== Transportation ==
- Bus - linking Kamias in Quezon City and Makati to Boac via RO-RO ferry.
- Jeepneys - connecting to different municipalities of the province.
- Tricycle - serving commuters to and from interior barangays.

Biglang-Awa Bridge is the longest bridge in the province, connecting Barangay Tampus to Barangay Bantad. Many people stand on the bridge to watch the sun set and to get a good view of the Boac Cathedral.

== Education ==
There are two schools district offices which govern all educational institutions within the municipality. They oversee the management and operations of all private and public, from primary to secondary schools. These are the Boac North Schools District, and Boac South Schools District.

=== Primary and elementary schools ===
- Agot Elementary School
- Agumaymayan Elementary School
- Amoingon Elementary School
- Balagasan Elementary School
- Balaring-Caganhao Elementary School
- Balimbing Elementary School
- Bamban Elementary School
- Bangbangalon Elementary School
- Bantauyan Primary School
- Bantay Elementary School
- Binunga Elementary School
- Boac South Central School
- Boi Elementary School
- Buliasnin Elementary School
- Canat Elementary School
- Catubugan Elementary School
- Cawit Elementary School
- Don Luis Hidalgo Memorial School
- Don Severino Lardizabal Memorial School
- Duyay Elementary School
- Hinapulan Elementary School
- Holy Child Jesus Parochial School
- Little Stars Pre-school
- Lord of Lords Christian School
- Lupac-Tabigue Elementary School
- Mahinhin Elementary School
- Mainit Elementary School
- Maligaya Elementary School
- Mansiwat Primary School
- Maybo Elementary School
- Minido Preschool
- Pawa Elementary School
- Pili-Balogo Elementary School
- Poctoy Elementary School
- Poras Elementary School
- Puting Buhangin Elementary School
- Puyog Elementary School
- Sawi Elementary School
- Tambunan Elementary School
- Tanza Elementary School
- Tugos Elementary School
- Tumagabok Elementary School

=== Secondary ===
- Cawit National Comprehensive High School
- Ilaya National High School
- Marinduque National High School - the main public high school in the province. This institution was used as a camp for Japanese, American, and Filipino soldiers during World War II.
- MSC Laboratory High School - a laboratory school located in Brgy. Tanza administered by the Marinduque State University.

=== Higher educational institutions ===
- Educational Systems Technological Institute
- Marinduque State University Main Campus - a public state college located in Brgy. Tanza; formerly known as Marinduque Institute of Science and Technology and Marinduque School of Arts and Trades.
- St. Mary's College of Marinduque (formerly Immaculate Conception College of Marinduque) - a private, Catholic school under the Religious of the Virgin Mary (RVM) located in Brgy. Isok I offering vocational and non-vocational courses including Teacher Education, Business Administration, and Hotel Management.

== Tourism ==
- Boac Town Plaza, located in Barangay San Miguel, is where most major gatherings and festivals are held.
- The Boac Museum, beside the Boac Town Plaza and Rizal Park, is home to a collection of facts and information about the Island.
- The Boac Cathedral is Marinduque's central cathedral. In Barangay Mataas na Bayan, it is a historical church where the Katipunan Flag is said to have been baptized. Our Lady of Immaculate Conception is the patron saint of Boac, while Birhen ng Biglang-Awa is the patroness of the province.
- In Barangay San Miguel, the Boac Town Arena is where the famous senakulo (a part of the celebration of Moriones Festival) is held.
- Laylay Port is a historical landmark in the municipality where the Japanese and American troops landed. It was once a commercial port where goods and products from other places embarked.

== Culture ==
Roman Catholicism is the major religion in Boac, with the see of the Diocese located in its town proper, the Immaculate Conception Cathedral.

There are also several Christian denominations present, such as the Iglesia ni Cristo, which operates chapels in Boac. Born-Again groups are also active such as the Victory, Solid Rock, and Jesus the Lord of Lords Churches.

- The Annual Moriones Festival is held in Boac and surrounding areas of Marinduque Island during the Lenten season. This holy celebration is famed as one of the most colorful festivities in Marinduque and the Philippines.
- The Feast of the Immaculate Conception is celebrated every December 8.

== Notable personalities ==
- Ricardo Paras (February 17, 1891 - October 10, 1984) - Chief Justice of the Supreme Court of the Philippines from April 2, 1951, until February 17, 1961.
- Paz Latorena (January 17, 1908 – October 19, 1953) - one of the foremost writers of the first generation of Filipino English writers, in both literary writing and education was a poet, editor, author, and teacher.
- Pilar Hidalgo-Lim (May 24, 1893 - December 8, 1973) - Filipino educator and civic leader. She was married to Brig. General Vicente Lim, a World War II hero.
- Hayden Kho - Filipino celebrity and doctor with roots from Brgy. San Miguel, Boac.
- Gretchen Malalad - Filipina 2005 Southeast Asian Games karate gold medalist and a former beauty pageant contestant in Binibining Pilipinas 2002 with roots from Brgy. Tugos, Boac.
- Zaijian Jaranilla - Filipino actor and model having primary allegiance with ABS-CBN Corporation under Star Magic and secondary allegiance conditionally with other media companies (GMA Network and TV5 Network) who is best known for his role as the orphan Santino in the 2009–2013 ABS-CBN religious-themed teleserye, May Bukas Pa. A native of Gloria, Oriental Mindoro and resides at University of the Philippines (UP) Professors Subdivision at Tandang Sora (formerly Roxas District until 2019) in Quezon City, Metro Manila, he spends his vacation at Brgy. Amiongon, Boac.
- Zymic Jaranilla – Zaijian Jaranilla's sibling who originally worked with ABS-CBN briefly and currently a GMA Network contract artist. Like Zaijian, he is a native of Gloria, spends vacation at Boac, and resides at Quezon City.

== Sister cities ==
- Tayabas City, Quezon, Philippines
