= Mogpog =

Municipality in Marinduque, Philippines

- Municipality
- Municipality of Mogpog
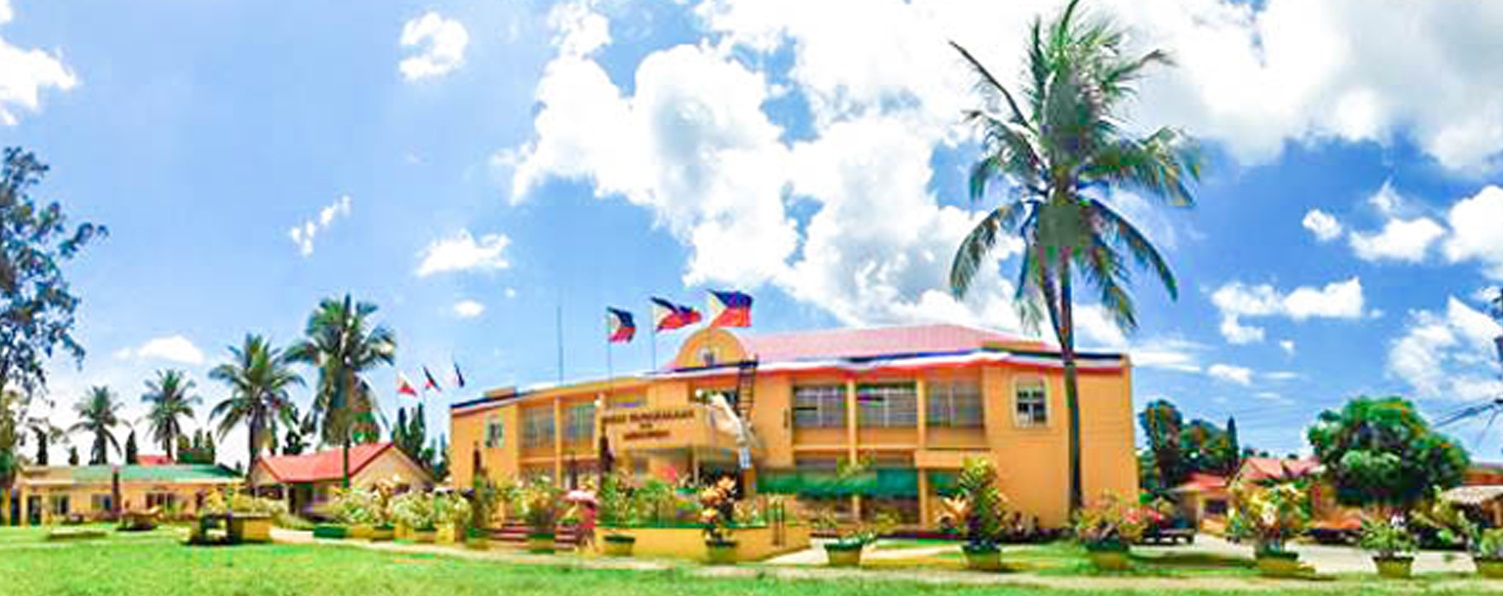
- Mogpog Municipal Hall

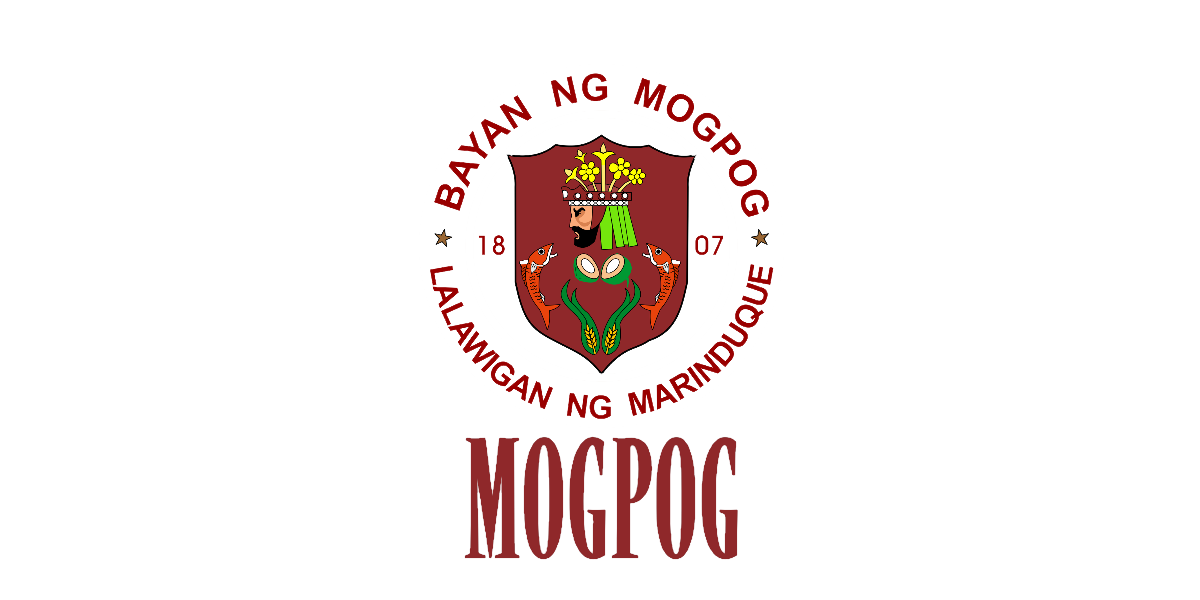
- Flag Seal
- Nicknames: Gateway to the Heart of the Philippines; Home of the Original Moriones
- Anthem: Mogpog Hymn
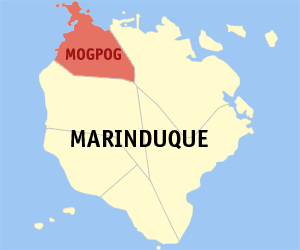
- Map of Marinduque with Mogpog highlighted
- Interactive map of Mogpog
- Location within the Philippines
- Coordinates: 13°28′26″N 121°51′40″E
- Country: Philippines
- Region: Mimaropa
- Province: Marinduque
- District: Lone district
- Founded: 1807
- Barangays: 37 (see Barangays)

Government
  - Type: Sangguniang Bayan
  - Mayor: Senen Livelo Jr.
  - Vice Mayor: Augusto Leo M. Livelo
  - Representative: Reynaldo Salvacion
  - Councilors: List: Franklin Sarili; Mauris Malilay; Edgardo Dela Cruz; Belen Luisaga; Rufino Logmao; Edmundo Ola; Robert Narito; Romeo Motar; ABC President; Baldomero Limpiada; PPSK President; Apol Largado
  - Electorate: 23,172 voters (2025)

Area
  - Total: 108.06 km^{2} (41.72 sq mi)
- Elevation: 33 m (108 ft)
- Highest elevation: 692 m (2,270 ft)
- Lowest elevation: 0 m (0 ft)

Population (2024 census)
  - Total: 32,577
  - Density: 301.47/km^{2} (780.81/sq mi)
  - Households: 9,048
- Demonym: Mogpogueño

Economy
  - Income class: 2nd municipal income class
  - Poverty incidence: 9.91% (2023)
  - Revenue: ₱ 190.7 million (2024)
  - Assets: ₱ 547.9 million (2024)
  - Expenditure: ₱ 161.7 million (2024)
  - Liabilities: ₱ 152.7 million (2024)

Service provider
  - Electricity: Marinduque Electric Cooperative (MARELCO)
- Time zone: UTC+8 (PST)
- ZIP code: 4901
- PSGC: 1704004000
- IDD : area code: +63 (0)42
- Native languages: Tagalog
- Major religions: Catholic Church; Protestantism; Iglesia ni Cristo
- Feast date: May 15
- Patron saint: St. Isidore the Laborer
- Website: mogpog.gov.ph

Mogpog /mɔːɡˈpoʊɡ/, officially the Municipality of Mogpog (Tagalog: Bayan ng Mogpog), is a municipality in the province of Marinduque, Philippines. According to the 2024 census, it has a population of 32,577 people.

== History ==
In 1911, a stone marker was placed by the United States Coast and Geodetic Survey (USC&GS), now National Oceanic and Atmospheric Administration (NOAA), at Luzon Datum or Station Balanacan, Mt. Mataas, Barangay Hinanggayon to indicate the geographical center of the Philippines. The site was commemorated by a historical marker installed on August 9, 2011.

In 1942, the Japanese troops occupied the town of Mogpog.

In 1945, during the Second World War, at the liberation of the town of Mogpog, American and Filipino troops fought against the Japanese Imperial forces during the Battle of Marinduque.

Historically, the famous Moriones Festival is said to have originated from Mogpog. Moriones Festival was founded by a Spanish friar, Rev. Father Dionisio Santiago, the first parish priest of Mogpog. This festival is known to be one of the most colorful festivals in Marinduque and the Philippines. It is held in Mogpog and the surrounding areas of Marinduque island.

== Geography ==
The town is at the geographical center of the Philippines, attested by the site of the Luzon Datum of 1911 or Station Balanacan, a stone marker placed at a hill called Mt. Mataas, Barangay Hinanggayon. As the geographical center, it has been the primary geodetic reference station for triangulation in the country.

Mogpog is 5 kilometres (3.1 mi) from Boac.

=== Barangays ===
Mogpog is politically subdivided into 37 barangays. Each barangay consists of puroks and some have sitios.

Hinanggayon was formerly a sitio of barrio (barangay) Argao; in 1954 it was elevated as a barrio.

- Anapog-Sibucao
- Argao
- Balanacan
- Banto
- Bintakay
- Bocboc
- Butansapa
- Candahon
- Capayang
- Danao
- Dulong Bayan (Poblacion)
- Gitnang Bayan (Poblacion)
- Guisian
- Hinadharan
- Hinanggayon
- Ino
- Janagdong (Planned Poblacion Expansion)
- Lamesa
- Laon
- Magapua
- Malayak
- Malusak
- Mampaitan
- Mangyan-Mababad
- Market Site (Poblacion)
- Mataas Na Bayan (Poblacion)
- Mendez
- Nangka I (Planned Poblacion Expansion)
- Nangka II
- Paye
- Pili
- Puting Buhangin
- Sayao
- Silangan
- Sumangga
- Tarug
- Villa Mendez (Poblacion)

The town center or poblacion comprises the barangays of Dulong Bayan, Gitnang Bayan, Market Site, Mataas na Bayan, and Villa Mendez with possible expansion to barangays of Janagdong and Nangka I.

=== Climate ===
Climate data for Mogpog, Marinduque
Month	Jan	Feb	Mar	Apr	May	Jun	Jul	Aug	Sep	Oct	Nov	Dec	Year
Mean daily maximum °C (°F)	26 (79)	27 (81)	29 (84)	31 (88)	30 (86)	30 (86)	29 (84)	29 (84)	29 (84)	29 (84)	28 (82)	26 (79)	29 (83)
Mean daily minimum °C (°F)	22 (72)	22 (72)	22 (72)	23 (73)	24 (75)	24 (75)	24 (75)	24 (75)	24 (75)	24 (75)	23 (73)	23 (73)	23 (74)
Average precipitation mm (inches)	83 (3.3)	55 (2.2)	44 (1.7)	37 (1.5)	90 (3.5)	123 (4.8)	145 (5.7)	125 (4.9)	135 (5.3)	166 (6.5)	163 (6.4)	152 (6.0)	1,318 (51.8)
Average rainy days	15.1	10.8	11.9	11.4	19.9	23.7	26.3	23.9	23.9	22.1	20.2	18.6	227.8
Source: Meteoblue

== Demographics ==
Population census of Mogpog
Year	Pop.	±% p.a.
1903	6,956	—
1918	6,827	−0.12%
1939	12,132	+2.78%
1948	12,922	+0.70%
1960	18,413	+2.99%
1970	21,980	+1.78%
1975	24,736	+2.40%
1980	26,399	+1.31%
1990	25,337	−0.41%
1995	28,201	+2.03%
2000	31,330	+2.28%
2007	33,341	+0.86%
2010	33,384	+0.05%
2015	34,043	+0.37%
2020	34,516	+0.29%
2024	32,577	−1.38%
Source: Philippine Statistics Authority

In the 2024 census, the population of Mogpog was 32,577 people, with a density of 300 inhabitants per square kilometre or 780 inhabitants per square mile.

== Economy ==
Poverty incidence of Mogpog (%)

Source: Philippine Statistics Authority

== Landmarks ==
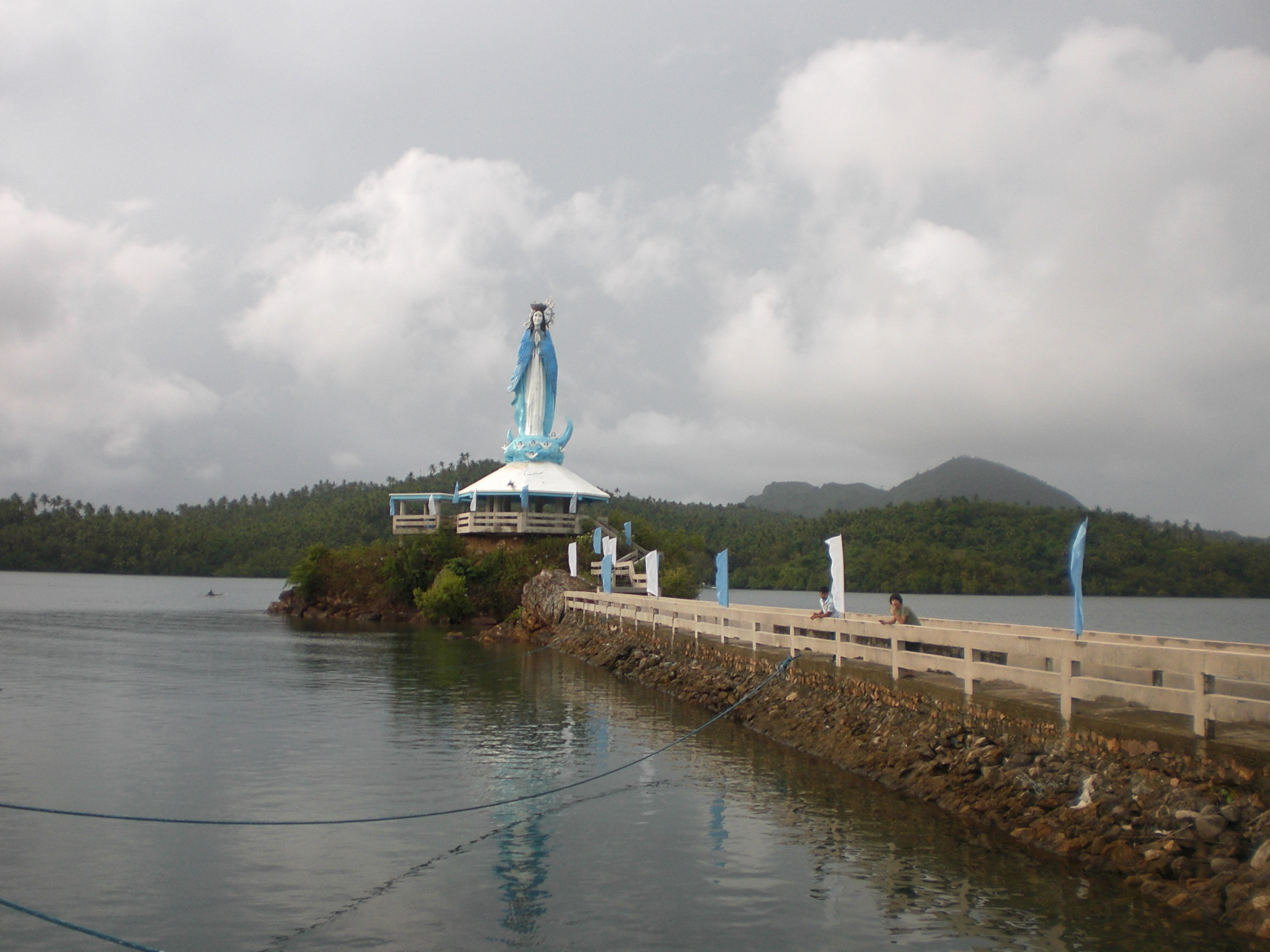
A Shrine and Statue of the Mahal na Birhen ng Biglang Awa overlooking the Port of Balanacan.

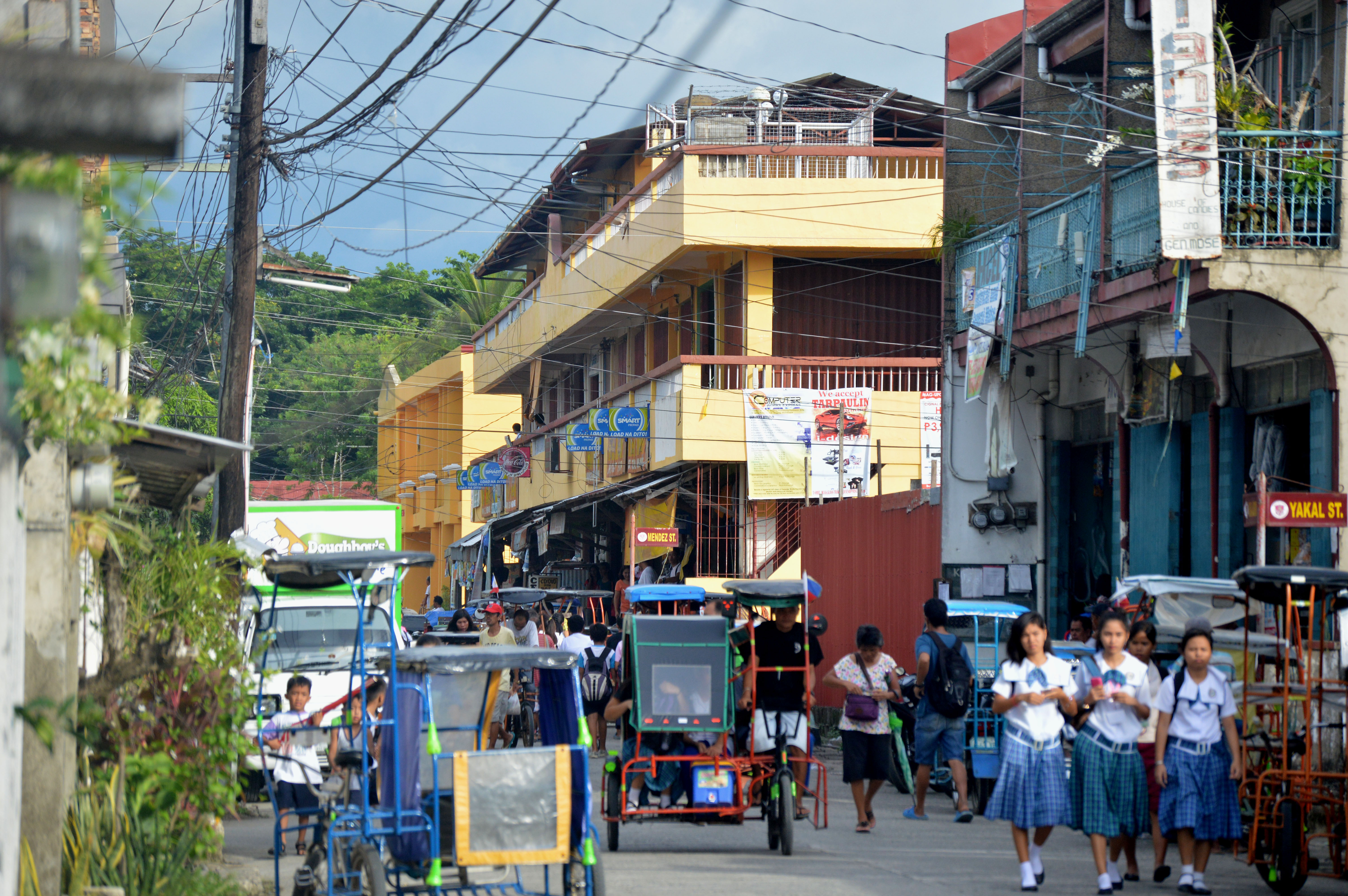
Downtown Mogpog

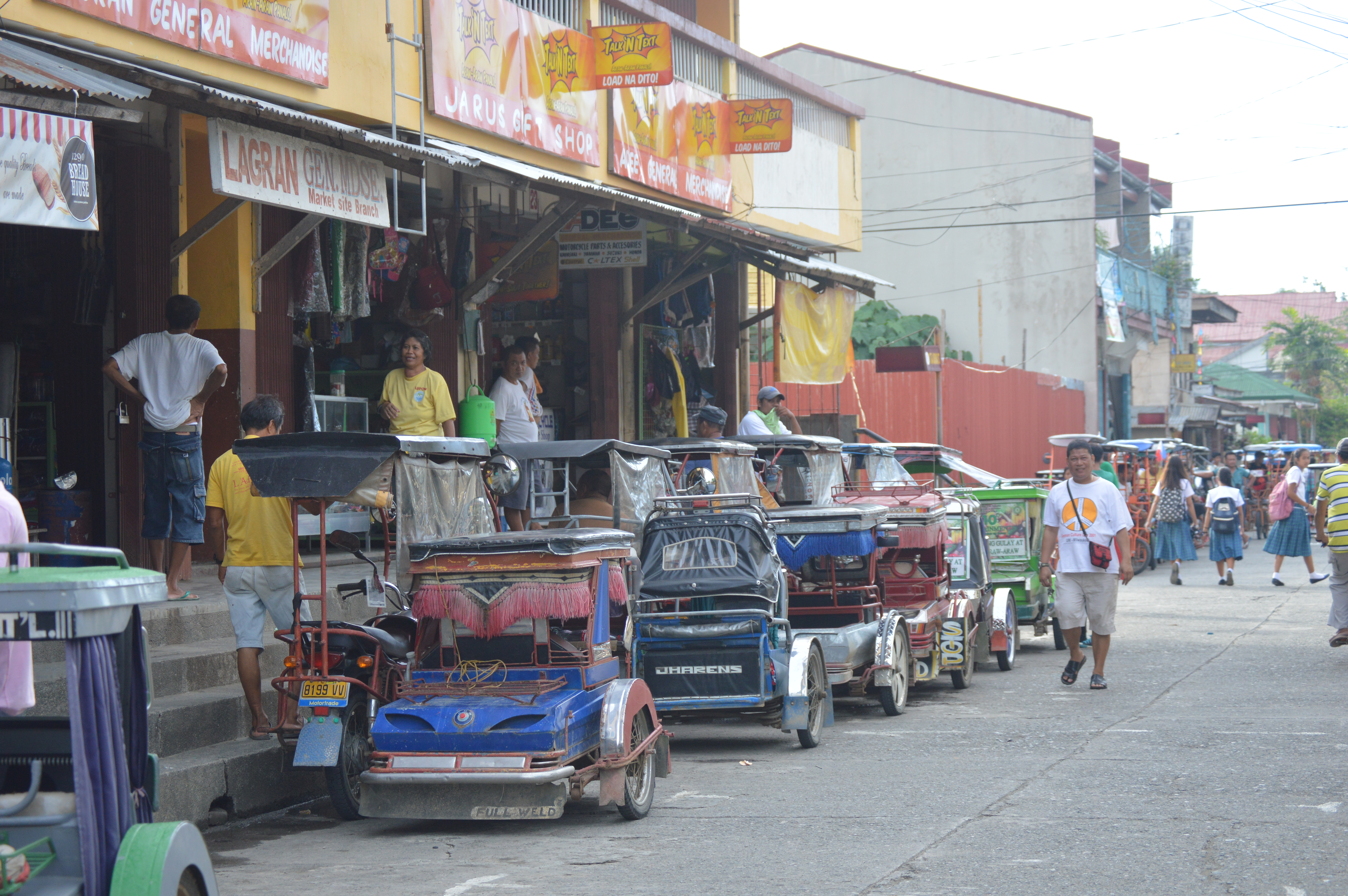
Public Transportation

Barangay Balanacan is home to the town’s main shipping port and is notable for the large image of Our Lady of Biglang Awa, which stands atop a structure on an elevated mound overlooking the sea.

Nearby is the town plaza, situated beside the main building of Marinduque Academy. The plaza offers views of a local park, the municipal building, and the trial court, all located within the vicinity of the public market.

The site of the Luzon Datum of 1911, along with its stone and historical markers, also serves as a local tourist attraction.

== Education ==
The Mogpog Schools District Office governs all educational institutions within the municipality. It oversees the management and operations of all public and private schools, from primary to secondary.

=== Primary and elementary schools ===
- Argao Elementary School
- Balanacan Elementary School
- Bintakay Elementary School
- Bocboc Elementary School
- Butansapa Elementary School
- Capayang-Ino Elementary School
- Danao Public School
- Guisian Elementary School
- Hinadharan Public School
- Hinanggayon Elementary School
- Ino Primary School
- Janagdong Elementary School
- Lamesa Elementary School
- Laon Elementary School
- Magapua Elementary School
- Malayak Elementary School
- Mampaitan Public School
- Mendez Elementary School
- Mogpog Central School
- Nangka Elementary School
- Paye Elementary School
- Pili Elementary School
- Puting Buhangin Elementary School
- Sayao Elementary School
- Silangan Elementary School
- Sumangga Primary School
- Tarug Public School

=== Secondary schools ===
- Argao National High School
- Balanacan National High School
- Butansapa National High School
- Marinduque Academy (Barangay Gitnang Bayan)
- Mogpog NCHS
- Sayao National High School
- Quezon-Roxaz High School (poblacion)
- Puting Buhangin National High School

== Notable personalities ==
- Cardinal Ricardo Jamin Vidal, archbishop emeritus of Cebu was born February 6, 1931, in Mogpog.

== Sister cities ==
- Makati, Philippines
