= List of historical markers of the Philippines in Northern Mindanao =

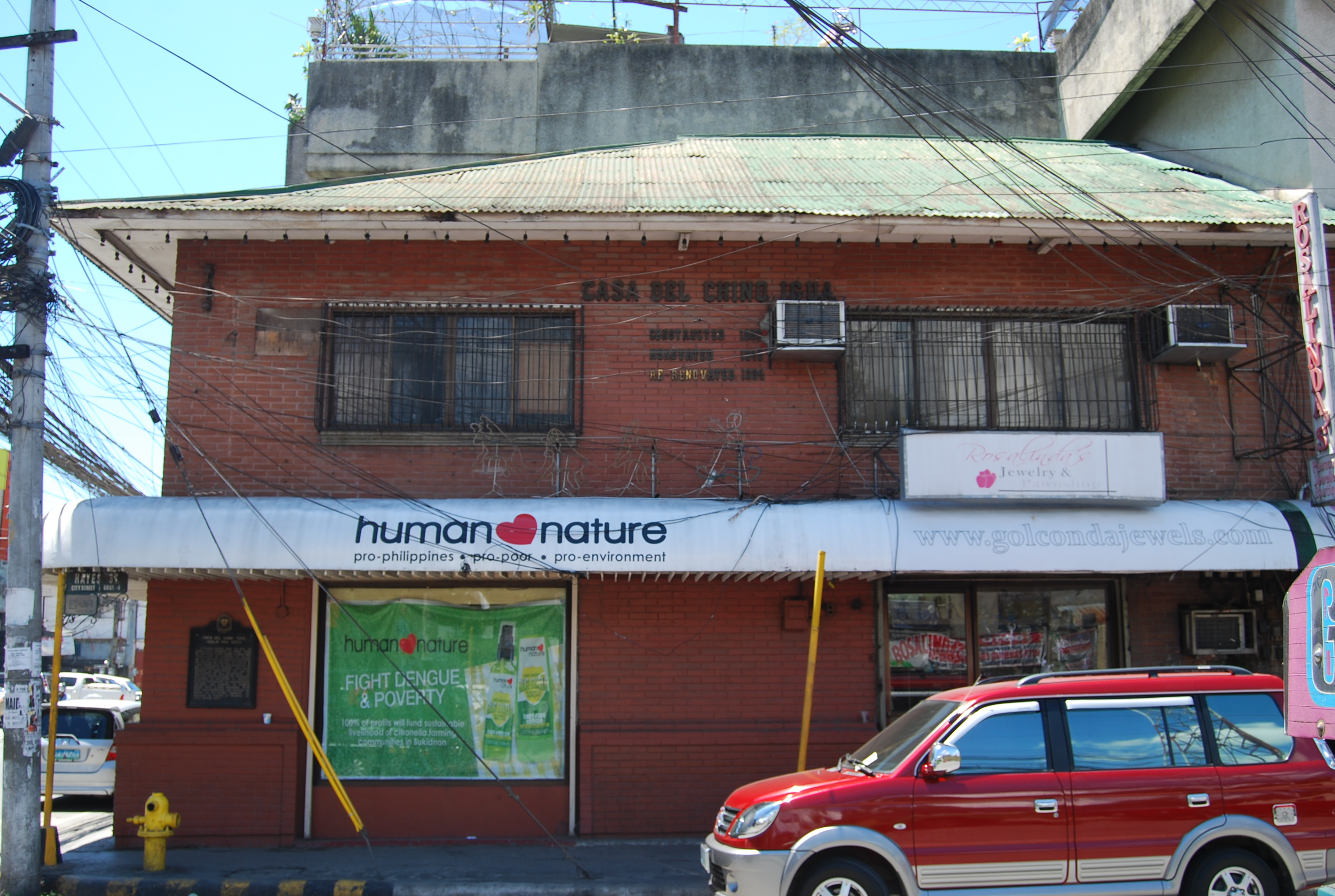
Casa del Chino Ygua house and marker, Cagayan de Oro, Misamis Oriental

This list of historical markers installed by the National Historical Commission of the Philippines (NHCP) in Northern Mindanao (Region X) is an annotated list of people, places, or events in the region that have been commemorated by cast-iron plaques issued by the said commission. The plaques themselves are permanent signs installed in publicly visible locations on buildings, monuments, or in special locations.

While many Cultural Properties have historical markers installed, not all places marked with historical markers are designated into one of the particular categories of Cultural Properties.

The marker for the Macapagal-Macaraeg House marker in Iligan, issued in 2002, became an issue because President Diosdado Macapagal never lived in the said house, although it became a home for his daughter President Gloria Macapagal-Arroyo, the president at that time.

This article lists 15 markers from the Northern Mindanao region.

== Bukidnon ==
This table lists three markers from the province of Bukidnon.

Marker title	Description	Location	Language	Date issued	Image
Camp Kasisang	A camp where war prisoners were imprisoned during World War II.	Malaybalay (currently within NHCP storage)	English	1948	
Kampo Kasisang (Note: Camp Kasisang)	A camp where war prisoners were imprisoned during World War II, including Manuel Roxas and William Sharp.	Casisang Central Integrated School, Malaybalay	Filipino	March 7, 2024	
Kapitolyo ng Bukidnon (Note: Bukidnon Capitol)	Current building built in 1933 following the designs of Juan Arellano.	Bukidnon Capitol, Valencia City	Filipino	March 20, 2025	

== Camiguin ==
This table lists one marker from the province of Camiguin.

Marker title	Description	Location	Language	Date issued	Image
Ang Camiguin (Note: The Camiguin)	Miguel Lopez de Legazpi landed here in February 1565. Famous for the Hibok-Hibok that erupted in 1951.	Mambajao	Filipino	1971 (shipped to the island on July 13)	

== Lanao del Norte ==
This table lists one marker from the province of Lanao del Norte.

Marker title	Description	Location	Language	Date issued	Image
Macapagal–Macaraeg Ancestral House	Declared as a heritage house by the NHCP.	Iligan	English	September 25, 2002	

== Misamis Occidental ==
This table lists three markers from the province of Misamis Occidental.

Marker title	Description	Location	Language	Date issued	Image
Fuerte de la Concepcion y del Triunfo (Note: Fort of the Conception and of the Triumph)	Constructed from coral stones in 1756. Became a headquarters for the Philippine Constabulary.	Ozamiz	Filipino	March 13, 2006	
Jose F. Ozamiz (1898–1944)	Governor of Misamis Occidental from 1929-1931. Martyred World War II guerrilla hero.	Aloran	Filipino	September 17, 2014	
Women's Auxiliary Service	Established by Josefa Borromeo Capistrano. They helped the tenth military district under Co. Wendell W. Fertic.	Ozamiz	English	July 15, 1965	

== Misamis Oriental ==
This table lists seven markers from the province of Misamis Oriental.

Marker title	Description	Location	Language	Date issued	Image
Casa del Chino Ygua (Balay nga Bato) (Note: Ygua's Chinese House (Stone House))	Made from bricks imported by Sia Ygua from Southern China. Built in 1882.	Archbishop Hayes St., Cagayan de Oro	Filipino	April 7, 2000	
Macabalan Wharf	Site where Gen. Douglas MacArthur left before going to Australia.	MacArthur Memorial Marker, Macabalan Port, Cagayan de Oro	Filipino	March 13, 2008	Macabalan Wharf NHCP Marker
Labanan sa Cagayan de Misamis (Note: Battle of Cagayan de Misamis)	Where Filipinos led by Gen. Nicolas Capistrano lost against the American forces.	Gaston Park, Cagayan de Oro	Filipino	April 7, 2000	
Labanan sa Burol Agusan (Note: Battle of Agusan Hill)	Where Filipinos led by Cap. Vicente Roa and Sgt. Uldarico Akut lost against the American forces.	Agusan Hill, Barangay Agusan, Cagayan de Oro	Filipino	May 14, 2000	
Labanan sa Burol ng Makahambus (Note: Battle of Macahambus Hill)	Where the Filipinos under Col. Apolinar Velez won against the American forces.	Cagayan de Oro	Filipino	June 4, 2000	
Pagtaas ng Watawat ng Pilipinas sa Cagayan de Misamis; 10 Enero 1899 (Note: The Raising of the Philippine Flag in Cagayan de Misamis: January 10, 1899)	The first raising of the Philippine flag in Cagayan de Misamis (now Cagayan de Oro) on January 10, 1899.	City Executive House, Cagayan de Oro	Filipino	January 13, 2015	
Simbahan ng Jasaan (Note: Jasaan Church)	Current structure started to be built in 1887, fashioned after San Ignacio Church.	Jasaan Church, Jasaan	Filipino	April 23, 2025	

== See also ==
- List of Cultural Properties of the Philippines in Northern Mindanao

== Bibliography ==
- National Historical Institute (1994). Historical Markers: Regions V-XIII. National Historical Institute.
- National Historical Institute (2008). Historical Markers (1992 - 2006). National Historical Institute.
- A list of sites and structures with historical markers, as of 16 January 2012
- A list of institutions with historical markers, as of 16 January 2012
