= List of Cultural Properties of the Philippines in Northern Mindanao =

This list contains an overview of the government recognized Cultural Properties of the Philippines in Northern Mindanao. The list is based on the official lists provided by the National Commission on Culture and the Arts, National Historical Commission of the Philippines and the National Museum of the Philippines.

Cultural Property wmph identifier (Note: wmph is an internal identifier used by Wikimedia Philippines to identify the monument. This is not an official identifier, and only shown temporarily in the templates until the government creates an updated complete list.)	Site name	Description	Province	City or municipality	Address	Coordinates	Image
PH-10-0001	Macapagal-Macaraeg Heritage House		Lanao del Norte	Iligan	Buru-un	8°11′28″N 124°10′44″E	Upload file
PH-10-0002	Fuerte de la Concepcion y del Triunfo		Misamis Occidental	Ozamiz	Baybay Triunfo	8°08′25″N 123°50′49″E	Upload file
PH-10-0003	Jimenez Church		Misamis Occidental	Jimenez		8°20′04″N 123°50′21″E	Upload file
PH-10-0004	Casa del Chino Ygua		Misamis Oriental	Cagayan de Oro	Don Apolinar Velez cor. Archbishop Hayes Sts.	8°28′35″N 124°38′39″E	Upload file
PH-10-0005	Macabalan Wharf		Misamis Oriental	Cagayan de Oro	Macabalan	8°29′41″N 124°39′45″E	Upload file
PH-10-0006	Immaculate Conception Parish Church		Misamis Oriental	Jasaan	Town Plaza	8°39′04″N 124°45′17″E	More images

== See also ==
- List of historical markers of the Philippines in Northern Mindanao
