= Jasaan Church =

Roman Catholic church in Misamis Oriental, Philippines

- Immaculate Conception Parish Church
- Iglesia Parroquial de la Inmaculada Concepción de María (Spanish)
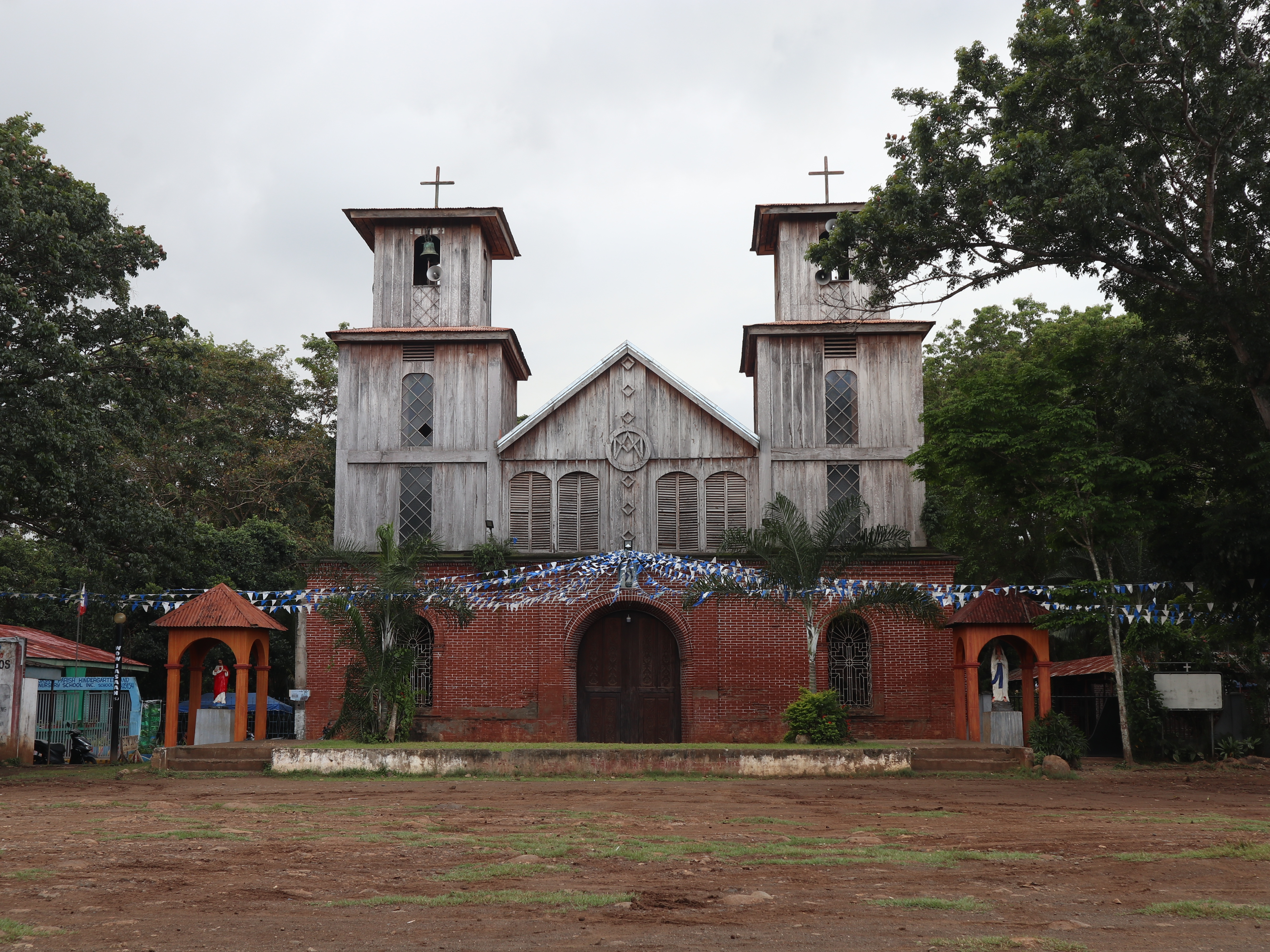
- Church facade in 2025

- Location in Mindanao Location in the Philippines
- 8°39′03″N 124°45′15″E
- Location: Upper Jasaan, Misamis Oriental
- Country: Philippines
- Denomination: Roman Catholic

Architecture
- Functional status: Active
- Heritage designation: National Cultural Treasure
- Architectural type: Church building
- Style: Barn Style Baroque
- Completed: Late 19th to early 20th century

Specifications
- Length: 150 feet (46 m)
- Width: 60 feet (18 m)
- Materials: Brick and wood

Administration
- Province: Ecclesiastical Province of Cagayan de Oro
- Archdiocese: Cagayan de Oro

Clergy
- Archbishop: Most Rev. José A. Cabantan, S.S.J.V.

Immaculate Conception Parish Church, commonly known as Jasaan Church, is a Baroque Roman Catholic church located in Poblacion, Upper Jasaan in Misamis Oriental, Philippines. It is under the jurisdiction of the Archdiocese of Cagayan de Oro. The church was declared by the National Museum as a National Cultural Treasure in Northern Mindanao due to its artistic design and cultural values.

The church was a provincial attempt to mimic the famous San Ignacio Church of Intramuros in Manila. The Jesuit brothers Francisco Rivera and Juan Cuesta are credited with the construction of the original church.

== History ==
NHC historical marker

The first church of Jasaan was built out of lime from 1723 to 1830 under the supervision of Fr. Ramos Cabas, parish priest in sitio Kabitaugan in barangay Aplaya. The first church is currently in ruins and a "cotta" or fortification is visible on the low hill near the highway. In 1859, Jasaan became the base for evangelical activities among the Manobos in Bukidnon. From Jasaan, missionaries fanned out to areas in Bukidnon now known as Malitbog, Siloo, San Luis, Linabo, and Sumilao. In 1887, Father Juan Herras, a Jesuit, began the construction of the present Immaculate Conception Church. Father Gregorio Parache, S.J., was the parish priest of Jasaan at that time. The construction aimed to mimic the famous San Ignacio Church of Intramuros in Manila.

Due to its cultural and historical value, the National Museum declared the Immaculate Conception Parish Church a National Cultural Treasure on July 31, 2001.

Priests who served the first church in Jasaan (currently ruins)
Parish Priest	Inclusive Dates	Notes
Fray Jose Casals, OAR	1834	
Fray Manuel de Sta. Rita, OAR	1838	
Dom. Vicente de Dolores, OAR	1844-1845	
Fray Gregorio Logrono del Ducisimo Nombre de Maria, OAR	1845-1852	
Fray Ramon Cabas, OAR	1851	
Fray Fernando Ramos de la Encarnacion, OAR	1852	
Fray Mateo Bernard, OAR	March 1873 – 1877	
Fray Benigno Jimenez, OAR	July 1882-January 1887	Last priest from the Order of Augustinian-Recollect
Fr. Nenesio Llorente, SJ	Jan. 26, 1887 - June 25, 1887	First Spanish Jesuit
Fr. Pablo Pastells, SJ	June 25, 1887 - Oct. 8 - 1887	
Fr. Juan Herras, SJ	Nov. 1887 - Sept. 1915	
Fr. Juan Terricabras, SJ	Oct. 18, 1887 - Dec. 19, 1887	
Fr. Gregorio Parache, SJ	Dec. 19, 1887 - Oct. 22, 1888	

Priests who served the Immaculate Conception Parish Church
Parish Priest	Inclusive Dates	Notes
Fr. Juan Casellas, SJ	Oct. 29, 1888 - Oct. 30, 1888	
Fr. Juan Bautista Herras, SJ	Oct. 30, 1888 - Sept. 15, 1915	
Fr. Jaime Valles, SJ	Nov. 1915 - August 1927	Last Spanish Jesuit Priest
Fr. Joseph Lucas, SJ	March 1927 - Jan. 1930	First American Jesuit Priest
Fr. John A. Pollocks, SJ	Jan. 1930 - 1935	
Fr. Vincent de Paul O. Beirne, SJ	1935 - Jan. 1937	
Fr. Andrew F. Cervini, SJ	Jan. 1937 - Oct. 1938	
Fr. Harold Murphy, SJ	Oct. 1938 - Oct. 1950	
Fr. Clarence Martin, SJ	Oct. 1950 - April 1952	
Fr. Arthur F. Shea, SJ	April 1952 - Jan. 1953	
Fr. James S. Collins, SJ	Jan. 1953 - Oct. 1957	
Fr. Joseph Stoffel, SJ	Dec. 1957 - Dec. 1958	Last American Jesuit Priest
Fr. Alejandro Mejia, SSJV	1957 - 1975	First Filipino Parish Priest (from the Society of St. John Vianney)
Fr. Alfeo Villanueva, SSJV	1975 - 1976	
Fr. Bartolome Llenas, SSJV		
Fr. Elfedio Alilin, SSJV; Asst. Fr. Mariano Valmoria, SSJV and Asst.Fr. Diosdado Ladera	1984 - 1985	
Fr. Romeo Alavanza, SSJV; Asst. Fr. Alfredo Heyrosa, SSJV	1985 - 1988	
Fr. Pedro Baricutro, SSJV; Asst. Fr. Filomeno Cabulosan, SSJV	1988 - 1994; 1992	
Fr. Venecio Andohon, SSJV	1993	
Fr. Glenn Pimentel, SSJV	1994	
Fr. Cesar Ramantin		
Fr. Rolando Pabella, SSJV	1995-1999	
Fr. Allan Chabit, SSJV; Asst. Fr. Ramer Colanse, SSJV	1999-2000	
Fr. Elcon Magtrayo, SSJV	2000-2001	
Fr. Cesar Ramantin, SSJV		Temporary Assignment
Fr. William Salva, SSJV	2001	
Fr. Lyndon Zayas, SSJV	2002	
Fr. Aurelio Jaranilla, SSJV	2002	
Fr. Ismael Scott Escanilla, SSJV	2003	
Fr. Ruel Buhisan, SSJV	2004	
Fr. Bernard Elvin Simene, SSJV	2005	
Fr. Ronald Gadrenab, SSJV	2005	
Fr. Joe Schwegmann, SSJV	2005	
Fr. Filomeno Cabulusan, SSJV; Asst. Fr. Ronald Ledesma, SSJV	Oct. 17, 2006 - May 31, 2010	
Fr. Neil B. Limbaco, SSJV; Asst. Fr. Nemecio Pacaña, SJJV	June 1, 2010 - 2013; Nov. 2012 - 2013	
Fr. Ramer M. Colanse, SSJV	June 2013 – present	

== Architecture ==
The church of Jasaan falls under Barn Style Baroque with originally a tri-partite partition. It spans 150 feet (46 m) long and 60 feet (18 m) wide. The brick wall on all sides about 20 feet (6.1 m) high and almost 4 feet (1.2 m) thick. The portal area leads to two semi-arched openings to the choir loft area. Vertical articulation is rendered through the shallow piers which divide the areas into three. It is further squeezed to the narrow central portion of the facade. The church is flanked by square towers to a level above the apex of the pediment. Significant church portions includes the original brick paving, neo-Gothic retablo, and ceiling woodwork (reminiscent of basket weave).

The original facade of the church has been modified after a series of renovations. The original altar of the church has been moved backward to allow a larger area for the faithful inside the church building. The original sacristy has been moved to the side.

The church has two bell towers containing four bells in total. The oldest of the four bells is dated 1807 while the largest is cast "Nuestra Señora de la Inmaculada Concepcion de Jasaan Año 1854." The old church bells of the Immaculate Conception Church of Jasaan (four of them, excluding the one that was transferred to San Agustin Cathedral at Cagayan de Oro) bore these inscriptions around its outer rim: "Para El Pueblo de Jasaan 1860".

Closeup of façade

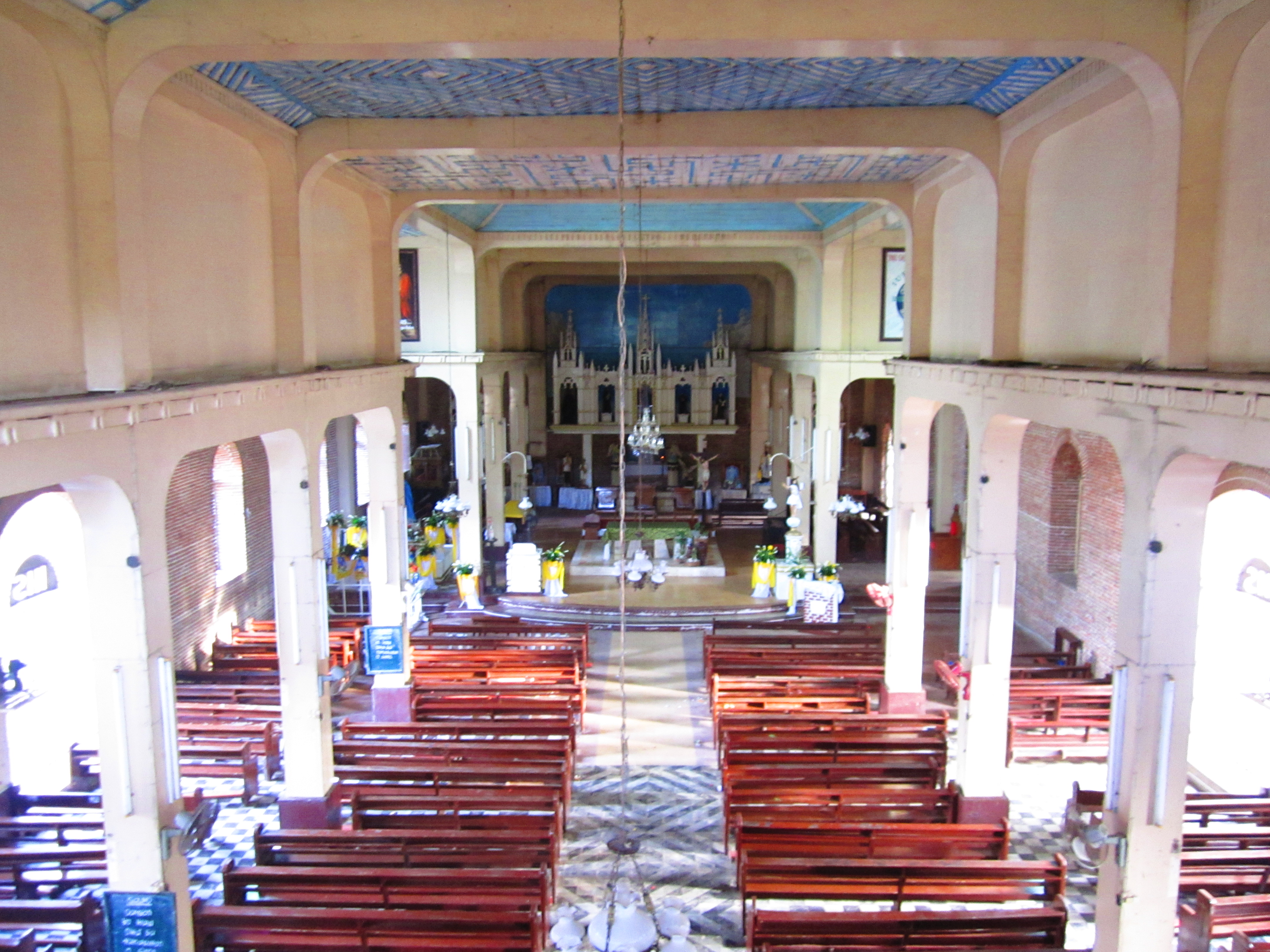
View of the nave and sanctuary from the choir loft

Altarpiece

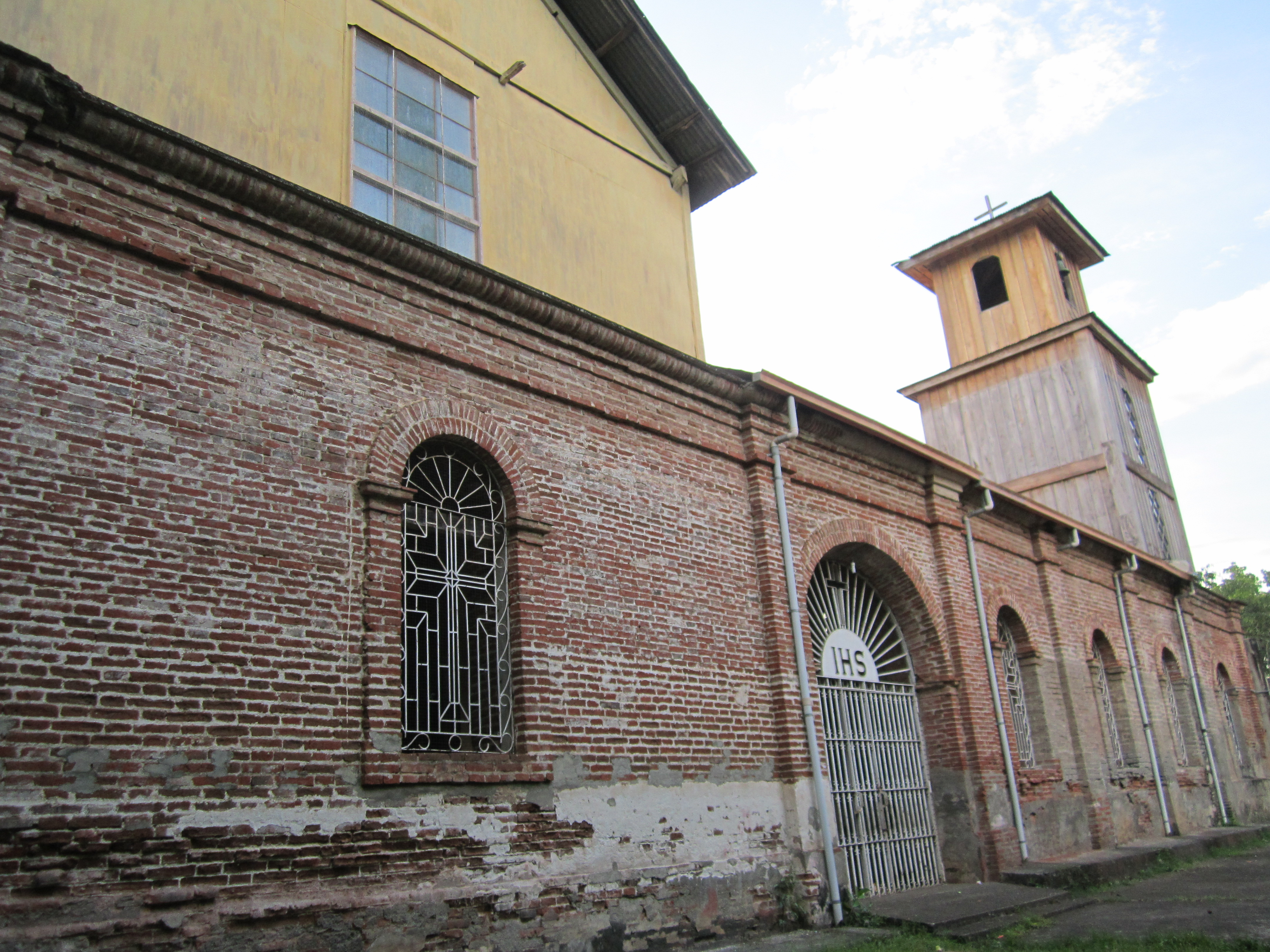
Side façade and one of the belltowers

Church bell

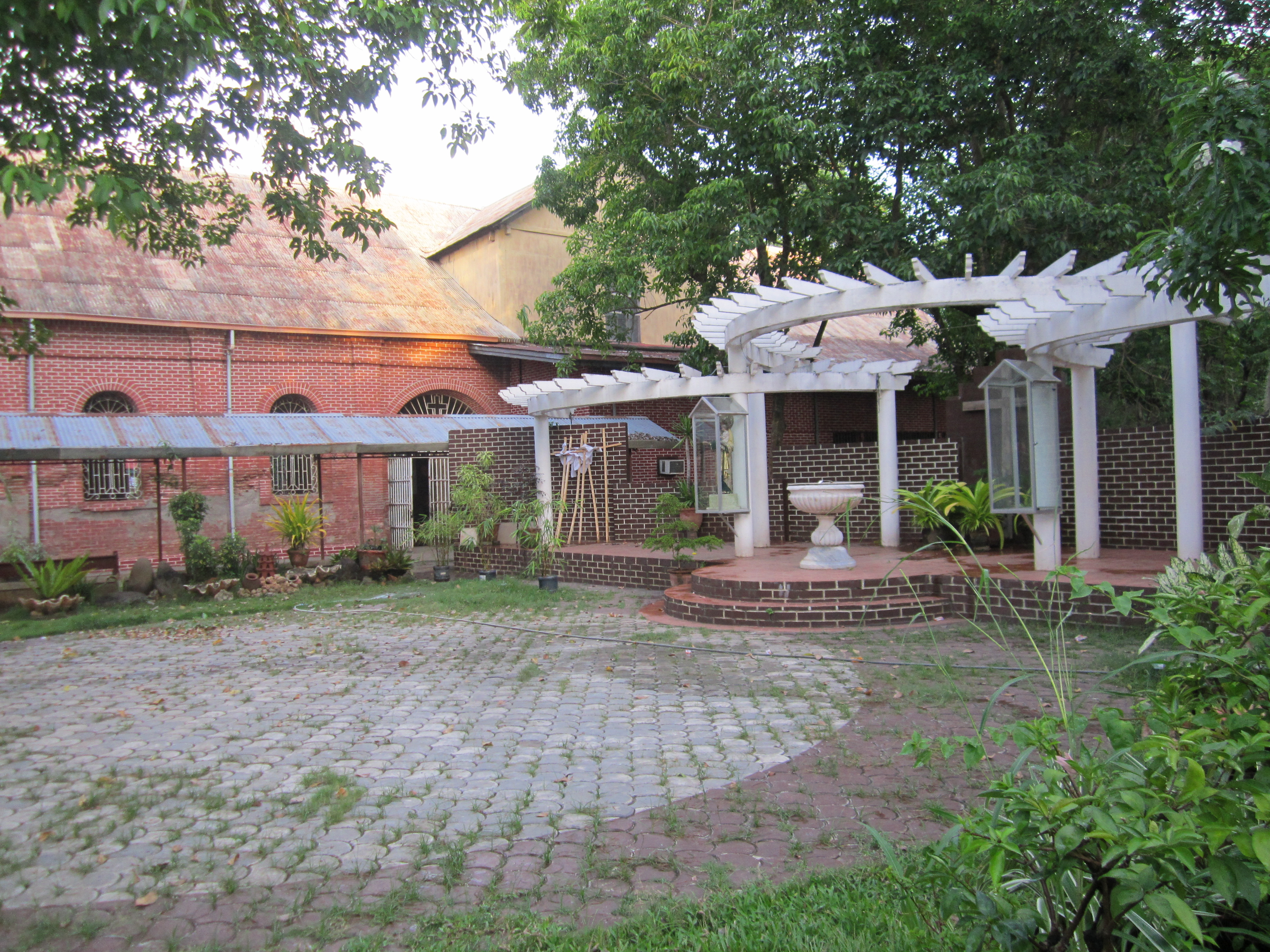
Church patio

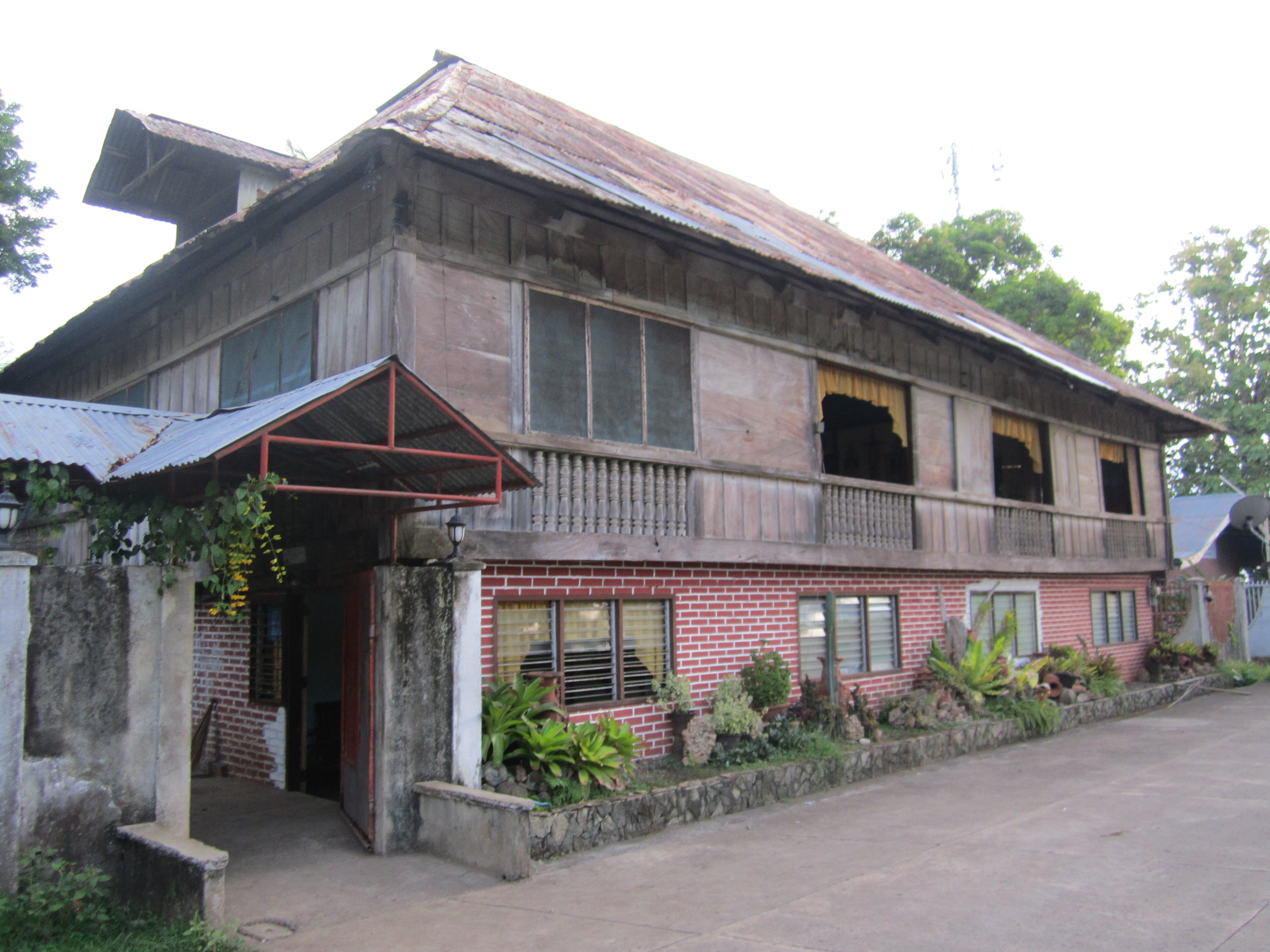
Convent

Aerial view of the church (lower right) and its surroundings

== See also ==
- List of Cultural Properties of the Philippines in Northern Mindanao
- Lists of Cultural Properties of the Philippines
- List of Jesuit sites
