= Jasaan =

Municipality in Misamis Oriental, Philippines

- Municipality
- Aerial view

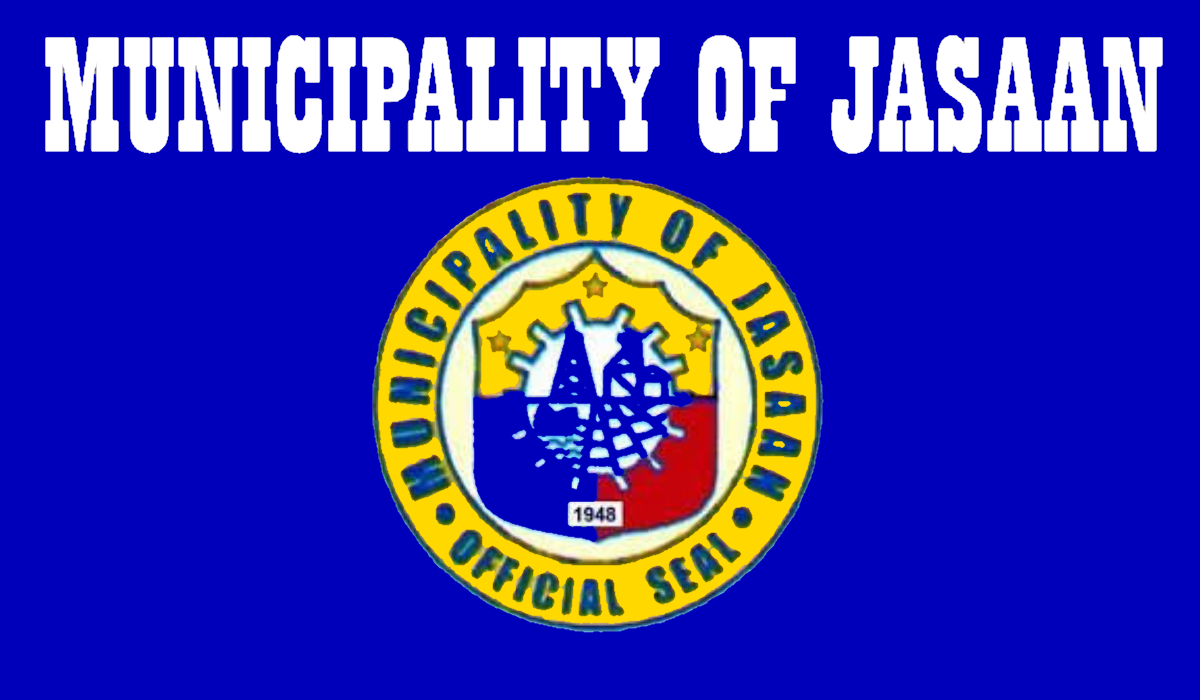
- Flag

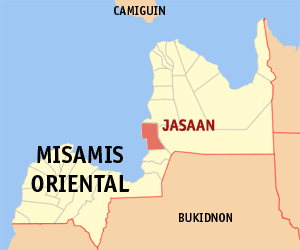
- Map of Misamis Oriental with Jasaan highlighted
- Interactive map of Jasaan
- Location within the Philippines
- Coordinates: 8°39′N 124°45′E
- Country: Philippines
- Region: Northern Mindanao
- Province: Misamis Oriental
- District: 2nd district
- Founded: September 1, 1948
- Barangays: 15 (see Barangays)

Government
  - Type: Sangguniang Bayan
  - Mayor: Redentor "Red" S. Jardin
  - Vice Mayor: Jannus Ray A. Estor
  - Representative: Yevgeny Vincent "Bambi" B. Emano
  - Municipal Council: Members: Adrian "Titi" D. Salcedo; Khaye E. Estacio; Gracia "Inday" E. Edades; Francisco "Boying" P. Uyguangco Jr.; Andres "Andy" Ompoc; Heracleo Adajar; Rodenio "Dr. Rody" C. Zayas; Rico C. Valdon
  - Electorate: 39,516 voters (2025)

Area
  - Total: 77.02 km^{2} (29.74 sq mi)
- Elevation: 90 m (300 ft)
- Highest elevation: 402 m (1,319 ft)
- Lowest elevation: 0 m (0 ft)

Population (2024 census)
  - Total: 58,098
  - Density: 754.3/km^{2} (1,954/sq mi)
  - Households: 13,740

Economy
  - Income class: 1st municipal income class
  - Poverty incidence: 22.14% (2023)
  - Revenue: ₱ 289.3 million (2024)
  - Assets: ₱ 747.7 million (2024)
  - Expenditure: ₱ 264.2 million (2024)
  - Liabilities: ₱ 378.6 million (2024)

Service provider
  - Electricity: Misamis Oriental 2 Rural Electric Cooperative (MORESCO 2)
- Time zone: UTC+8 (PST)
- ZIP code: 9003
- PSGC: 1004311000
- IDD : area code: +63 (0)88
- Native languages: Cebuano; Binukid; Subanon; Tagalog

Jasaan, officially the Municipality of Jasaan (Cebuano: Lungsod sa Jasaan; Tagalog: Bayan ng Jasaan), is a municipality in the province of Misamis Oriental, Philippines. According to the 2024 census, it has a population of 58,098 people.

It is approximately 28 kilometres (17 mi) east of the capital city of Cagayan de Oro. It borders on the municipalities of Villanueva, Claveria and Balingasag, while Macajalar Bay is to the west. Although its land is mostly rocky, it is able to maintain and support its lush vegetation and its main rivers, Cabulig, Dumagooc and Mandangisiao.

== Etymology ==
Jasaan was named by a Spanish missionary who chanced upon a native man (possibly from Higaonon tribe) sharpening his bolo in Sapong Spring in what is now called Kota, Aplaya, The missionary asked for the name of the place, however, the native replied “Ag-hasaa” meaning “I am sharpening my bolo”. The missionary, thought that he was answered correctly, called the place “Ag-hasaa”. He found it difficult for him to pronounce the word, and called it “Hasaan” instead. Then it was changed to “Jasaan”.

== History ==
In 1830, the mission of Jasaan was established separately from Cagayan de Oro, where its authority and evangelization reached as far as the towns of Sumilao, Libona and Malitbog in the province of Bukidnon.

The center of civilization of the new parish and its first church was at "Daanglungsod," which is now the Aplaya, Jasaan, where an old kota (watchtower) still exists. This kota, however, has been moved a few meters from where it originally stood to allow for the construction of the national highway in the 1970s.

Father Gregorio Parache, S.J. (432 local historical sources of Northern Mindanao by Father Francisco Demetrio, S.J.), was the parish priest of Jasaan at that time. The Jesuits later built the Nuestra Señora de Immaculada Concepcion Church in what is now the Immaculate Conception Church of Jasaan. The original facade of the church has been modified after a series of renovations. The original altar of the church has been moved backward to allow a larger area for the faithful inside the church building. The original sacristy has been moved to the side. The church is registered as a National Cultural Treasure by the National Commission for Culture and the Arts (NCCA).

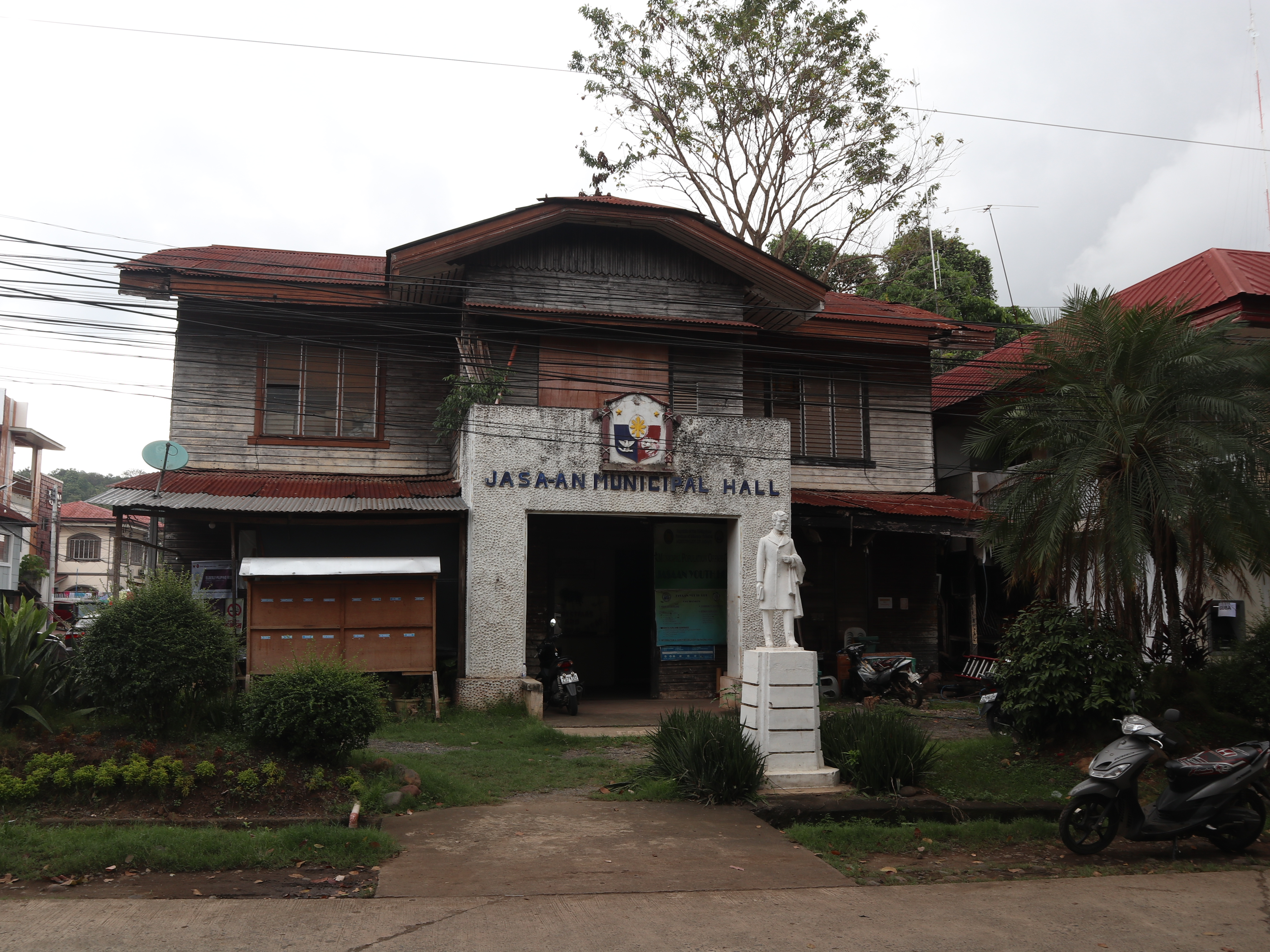
Old Jasaan Municipal Hall

Jasaan is believed to have been already a municipality during the establishment of the Immaculate Conception Parish in 1840. The old church bells (four of them, excluding the one now at the San Agustin Cathedral at Cagayan de Oro) of the Immaculate Conception Church of Jasaan bore these inscriptions around its outer rim: "Para El Pueblo de Jasaan 1860" [more or less], which suggests that the Spanish government had recognized Jasaan as a town.

With the coming of the Americans at the turn of the 20th century, the national government in 1903 downgraded the political status of Jasaan from that of a municipality to a barrio (a Spanish subdivision of a municipio) and made it a part of the Municipality of Balingasag. The Philippine Commission of 1903, Act No. 960, combined some municipalities in 1903 because the civil government had no control of these municipalities. They could not be defended by the Philippine constabulary or the scouts, nor could they be governed by the pro-American inhabitants. The Jasaanons called for the restoration of their municipio into a municipality. Eventually, on August 18, 1948, by virtue of Executive Order No. 165, issued by President Elpidio Quirino, Jasaan regained its municipal status. On November 10 in the same year, Jasaan was inaugurated as a municipality, and a set of appointed municipal officials assumed office (from the website of Jasaan Local Government).

In the early 1970s, electric power lines were installed and a road-widening program was undertaken in the area. Ubos once featured remnants of Hispanic-style houses along its main street, but these were destroyed by fire in the early 1980s.

Municipal hall

== Geography ==
=== Barangays ===
Jasaan is politically subdivided into 15 barangays Each barangay consists of puroks while some have sitios.

There are 8 barangays which considered coastal barangays (Aplaya, Solana, Luz Banzon, Kimaya, Lower Jasaan, Bobuntugan, Jampason and San Antonio) and 7 inland barangays (Upper Jasaan, Corrales, San Isidro, Natubo, Danao, San Nicolas, and Ignacio S. Cruz).

- Aplaya
- Bobuntugan
- Danao
- Ignacio S. Cruz
- Jampason
- Kimaya
- Corrales
- Lower Jasaan (Ubos)
- Luz Banzon (Kiog-ang)
- Natubo
- San Antonio
- San Isidro
- San Nicolas (Kilumba)
- Solana
- Upper Jasaan (Ibabaw)

=== Climate ===
Climate data for Jasaan, Misamis Oriental
| Month | Jan | Feb | Mar | Apr | May | Jun | Jul | Aug | Sep | Oct | Nov | Dec | Year |
|---|---|---|---|---|---|---|---|---|---|---|---|---|---|
| Mean daily maximum °C (°F) | 28 (82) | 29 (84) | 30 (86) | 31 (88) | 30 (86) | 30 (86) | 30 (86) | 30 (86) | 30 (86) | 30 (86) | 29 (84) | 29 (84) | 30 (85) |
| Mean daily minimum °C (°F) | 24 (75) | 24 (75) | 24 (75) | 25 (77) | 26 (79) | 26 (79) | 25 (77) | 25 (77) | 25 (77) | 25 (77) | 25 (77) | 25 (77) | 25 (77) |
| Average precipitation mm (inches) | 271 (10.7) | 217 (8.5) | 193 (7.6) | 178 (7.0) | 344 (13.5) | 423 (16.7) | 362 (14.3) | 358 (14.1) | 329 (13.0) | 320 (12.6) | 322 (12.7) | 260 (10.2) | 3,577 (140.9) |
| Average rainy days | 23.2 | 19.5 | 22.0 | 22.8 | 29.6 | 28.9 | 30.3 | 29.8 | 28.1 | 28.8 | 26.1 | 24.1 | 313.2 |
Source: Meteoblue

== Demographics ==
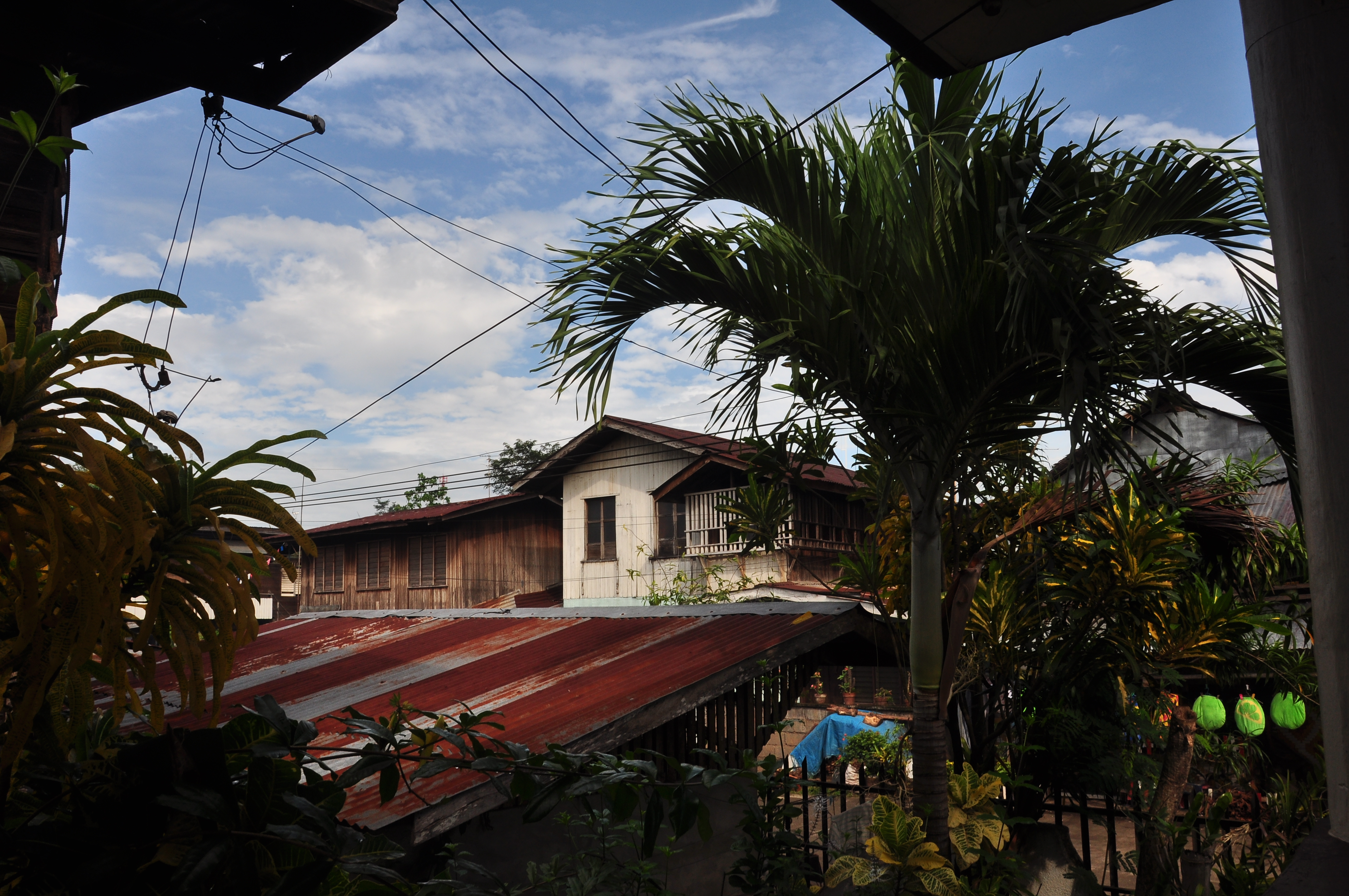
Rizal Street, Upper Jasaan

Population census of Jasaan

| Year | Pop. | ±% p.a. |
|---|---|---|
| 1903 | 3,175 | — |
| 1948 | 6,035 | +1.44% |
| 1960 | 11,676 | +5.65% |
| 1970 | 15,732 | +3.02% |
| 1975 | 18,486 | +3.29% |
| 1980 | 23,366 | +4.80% |
| 1990 | 29,146 | +2.24% |

| Year | Pop. | ±% p.a. |
|---|---|---|
| 1995 | 33,598 | +2.70% |
| 2000 | 39,969 | +3.79% |
| 2007 | 45,310 | +1.74% |
| 2010 | 50,121 | +3.74% |
| 2015 | 54,478 | +1.60% |
| 2020 | 57,055 | +0.98% |
| 2024 | 58,098 | +0.44% |

Source: Philippine Statistics Authority

In the 2024 census, the population of Jasaan was 58,098 people, with a density of 750 inhabitants per square kilometre or 1,900 inhabitants per square mile.

Approximately 20 percent of its 45,310 inhabitants live in the urban center. The population is mostly composed of descendants of those who settled there in the mid-1800s. Most of them are related by consanguinity and they speak a unique Cebuano dialect called Jasaanon, but can speak and understand standard Cebuano (Northern Mindanao variant) and Tagalog/Filipino. Other languages varyingly spoken as well in the municipality include Binukid, Subanen, Higaonon, Hiligaynon, Ilocano and Kapampangan.

== Economy ==
Poverty incidence of Jasaan (%)

Source: Philippine Statistics Authority

People are dependent on coconut, livestock and cattle. Other agricultural products, such as corn and vegetables, were minimal. Employment was provided primarily by the government through the public school system, a few national government agencies and the local government unit. Trading and merchandising was mostly confined to Ubos (now Lower Jasaan) along a stretch ending at the public market.

With the coming of electricity in the late 1960s, Jasaan slowly developed into an industrial town. Resins Incorporated and Philippine Iron Construction and Marine Works (PICMW) established their plants at Nahalinan, a village which is a part of Lower Jasaan. The Pilipinas Kao, another industrial plant, was established at Luz Banzon in the 1970s. A substation of the National Power Corporation has been established in Aplaya. Vertical infrastructure in the municipality of Jasaan improved when pavement and widening of the national highway that extends the whole of Northern Mindanao was completed in the 1970s.

At the turn of the millennium, Jasaan has gradually metamorphosed into a resort town. Entrepreneurs have capitalized on the abundance of its spring water sources. The town has spring resorts which draw visitors from neighboring areas.

== Tourism ==
A number of water resorts have been built in the town. The Sagpulon Falls in San Isidro is a tourist attraction. The Napapong Spring is also an attraction from Corrales. The local tourism office of Jasaan maintains the area to preserve is natural allure. The marine sanctuary is located at the waters around the white sands of Agutayan Island, five kilometers off the coast of Bobuntugan.

== Celebrations and holidays ==
The Christmas season in Jasaan used to end on February 2, to commemorate the feast of the Presentation of the Child Jesus at the Temple and the Purification of the Blessed Virgin Mary.

The town calendar of activities was associated with the calendar of the Roman Catholic Church. After the Lenten celebration, Jasaanons used to celebrate a second town fiesta on May 5, to honor St. Augustine. Then there was a lull until the All Souls Day, when Jasaanons from all over came to pay respects for their dead. This was followed by the parochial fiesta on December 8, and the Feast of the Immaculate Conception.

=== Lubong-lubong ===
During the 1960s, the Jasaanon had a calendar of activities that included a New Year's celebration with a "lubong-lubong"–a ritual marking the death of an old year and rejoicing in the birth of a new year. "Lubong-lubong" ("lubong" is vernacular for "to bury") was a mock burial, performed in the town plaza. It began with a masked old man in tattered clothes plodding around the hall where townsfolk gathered in merriment to greet the coming year. As the countdown to the New Year continued, the old man in tattered clothes disappeared in the dark. A little tot in diapers appeared in the midst of hall as the church tolled the knell of the dying year. The ringing shifted to the pealing of all the church bells in the twin belfries of the Immaculate Conception Church to mark the New Year. The Jasaanon was then led to the main door of the church, where a funeral bier awaited. A mock person tagged with the year that passed was laid on top of it, and a man dressed in tattered black cloth recited Latin prayer and led people through a funeral march, which ended at the gates of the Catholic cemetery. The bier was left at the gates to end the ritual.

== Town center, poblacion ==
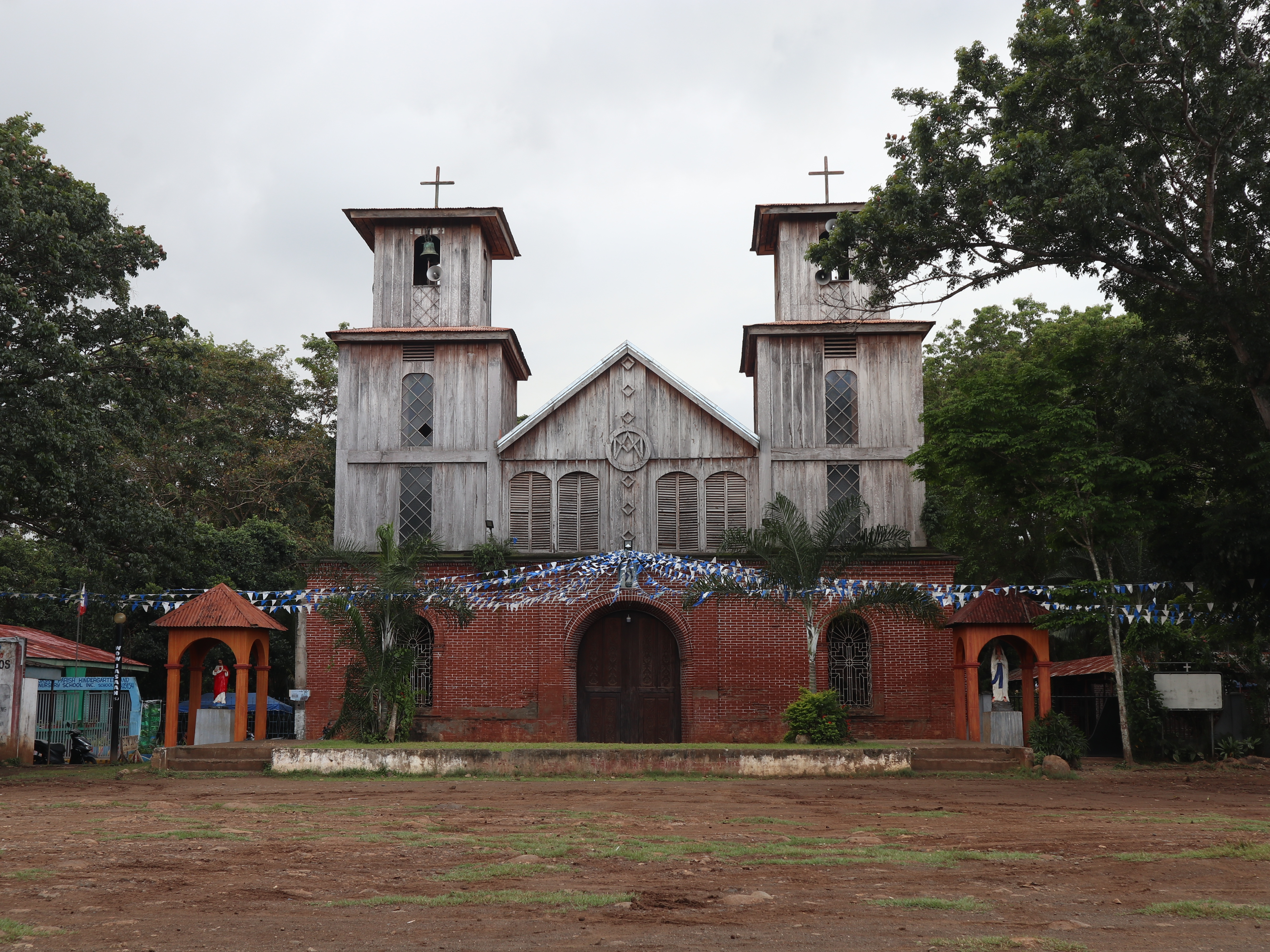
Immaculate Conception Church

The town center or poblacion of Jasaan is a picture of the Spanish Catholic concept of settlement model–"bajo de las campanas"–where people live around the vicinity of the church within earshot of the peal of the bells. There used to be a bell at the belfry of the Nuestra Senora de la Inmaculada Concepcion Church, where the peal could be heard as far as the hills of Natubo.

This town center used to be one big poblacion, subdivided into nine puroks (hamlets): Purok Uno, Purok Dos, Purok Tres, Purok Cuatro, Purok Cinco, Purok Seis, Purok Siete, Purok Ocho, and Purok Nueve. In the 1960s, these villages adopted names, such as like Siga-Siga, Mauswagon and Mabuligon, etc.

In the early 1970s, when martial law was in force, then-President Ferdinand Marcos (by a series of presidential decrees) made the barangay the basic political unit of Philippines. The Centro, as it used to known, was then split into Upper Jasaan and Lower Jasaan. Local residents would refer to these two as Ubos and Ibabaw, a vernacular indication of their geographical location in the slope: Ubos being Lower, and Ibabaw being Upper. Despite the partition of the Poblacion into two barangays, the old village identifications–the Purok–are still generally referred to in the present Jasaan.

Jasaan town plaza is a good example of the separation of church and state property. A road runs through the middle of the plaza, making the demarcation line. The portion fronting the centuries-old church belongs to the Roman Catholic Church, and on portion on the other side of the road is owned by the local government of Jasaan.

== Education ==
The Jasaan Catholic School (later Mary Immaculate Academy, and recently Saint Mary's Academy of Jasaan) which has been in operation from the start of the 20th century until the mid-70s, experienced competition from Jasaan National High School. The former was established by the Jesuits and later turned over to the Religious of the Virgin Mary, while the latter is a government-operated secondary school.

Schools of higher learning, like the Colegio de Santo Nino and Jasaan School of Midwifery and Jasaan Community College (later Don Mariano Marcos Polytechnic College of Jasaan and now Mindanao University of Science and Technology), were also established in Jasaan.
