= Fuerte de la Concepcion y del Triunfo =

Fuerte de la Concepción y del Triunfo
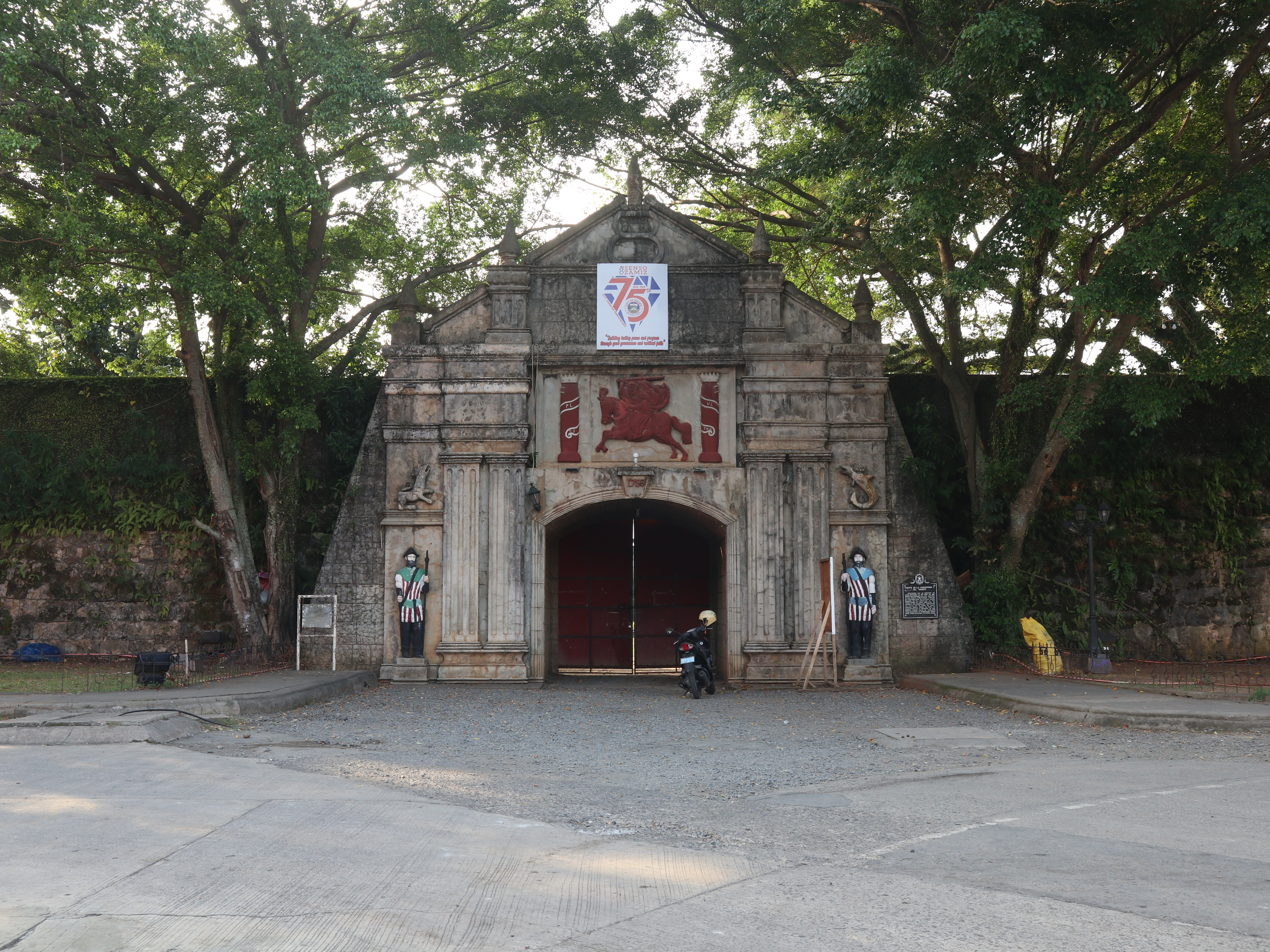
- Front entrance of the fort

- Location within Mindanao mainland Location within Philippines
- Alternative names: El Fuerte de Nuestra Señora de la Concepción del Triunfo, Fort of Misamis, Triunfo Fort

General information
- Type: Fortification
- Architectural style: Bastioned fort
- Location: Brgy. Baybay Triunfo, Ozamiz City, Philippines
- Coordinates: 8°08′25″N 123°50′50″E
- Construction started: 1756
- Renovated: 2002

Technical details
- Structural system: Masonry

Design and construction
- Designations: National Historical Landmark

The Fuerte de la Concepción y del Triunfo (lit. 'Fort of the Conception and of the Triumph'), also known as Fuerte de Nuestra Señora de la Concepción del Triunfo (Fort of Our Lady of the Conception of the Triumph), Fort of Misamis, and Triunfo Fort, is a fortress first built by Spanish Jesuit priest and commander José Ducos as a Spanish fortress in the old town of Misamis (now the city of Ozamiz) in the island of Mindanao.

The fort is an important historical landmark of the area as it symbolizes the city's cultural heritage. Outside of the fort's south wall is the Archdiocesan Marian Shrine of the Birhen sa Cotta, which is dedicated to the city's patroness, Nuestra Señora de la Inmaculada Concepción y del Triunfo de la Cruz de Migpangi. The shrine is a well-known pilgrimage site in the city.

== Features ==
The fort is square in shape, with one side facing Panguil Bay and the opposite side facing the city. The fort has four bastions (baluartes): San Fernando, San José, Santiago and San Ignacio. The fort's material is mostly blocks made from a mixture of coral and sandstone joined together by lime. The stones were a common building material which was mostly abundant in Panguil Bay and its islands.

At the fort's entrance is a large gate added during the 2002 renovation. The gate icon is a bas relief of Santiago Matamoros ("Saint James the Moorslayer" in Spanish), flanked on either side by heraldic repesentations of the Pillars of Hercules.

== History ==
=== Construction ===
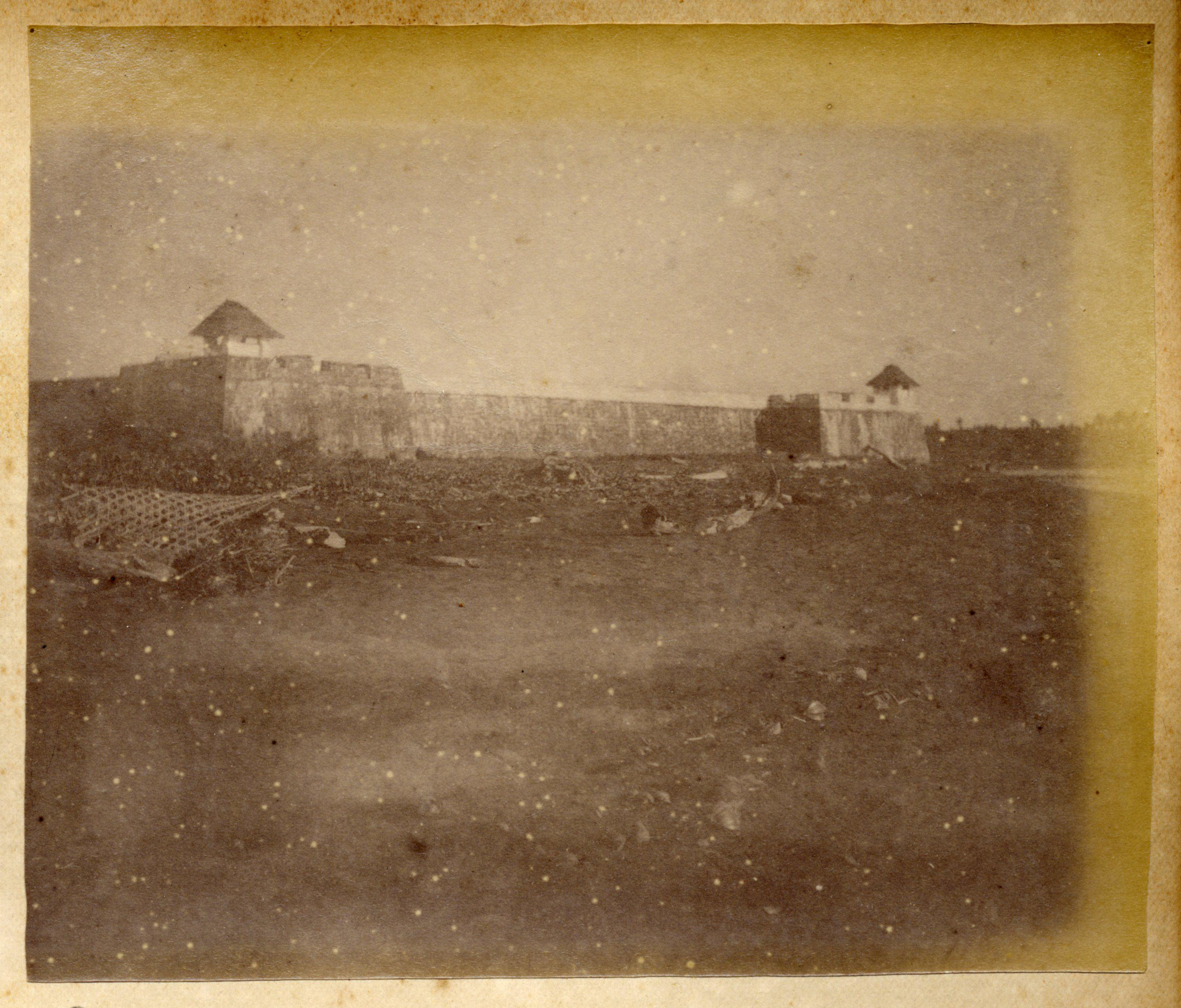
Fuerte de la Concepcion y del Triunfo in the late 1800s

1754 was known back then as a time of great suffering for the people living in coastal towns and villages in southern Luzon, Visayas and Mindanao. Marauding pirates would appear, with no warning, and would burn the houses, crops, and carry away as many of the people as they could catch in order to be sold as slaves in Maguindanao, Sulu, Borneo or Indonesia. This problem led to the creation of a flotilla by the Spanish government, and a Spanish Jesuit missionary, Father José Ducos, was appointed as its commander in order to counter this scourge. After several victorious battles and when some peace was restored, it was decided to construct a stone fort at the mouth of Panguil Bay as a form of protection against future attacks.

Construction of the fortress soon began in 1756. However, due to limited money for the payment of workers and transport of materials, the fort took a long time to finish. The fort also served as shelter for the ships of the Spanish fleet during that time.

Because of the fort's benefit to the town, Misamis became the most important town in Northern Mindanao in the 18th and early 19th centuries. Misamis was then made the capital of the District of Misamis when Mindanao was originally divided into five districts, until during the 1870s when the seat of government was transferred to Cagayan de Oro.

=== Naming of the fort ===
Father Ducos belonged to a society that had a special devotion to the Blessed Virgin Mary, under her title of the Immaculate Conception. The fort and the town was therefore put under her patronage, which led to the fort being officially called Fuerte de la Concepción y del Triunfo.

The name "Triunfo" (Triumph) comes from the leading vessel in battles that cleared the harbor of Misamis and Panguil Bay of pirates. It was named in honor of the Triunfo de la Cruz, the decisive battle of the Reconquista in which united Christian armies defeated the Moors at Las Navas de Tolosa in 1212. In thanksgiving for that victory, the Spaniards celebrated a special feast for the Triumph of the Cross on July 16 in the Mozarabic Rite.

=== Patronage ===
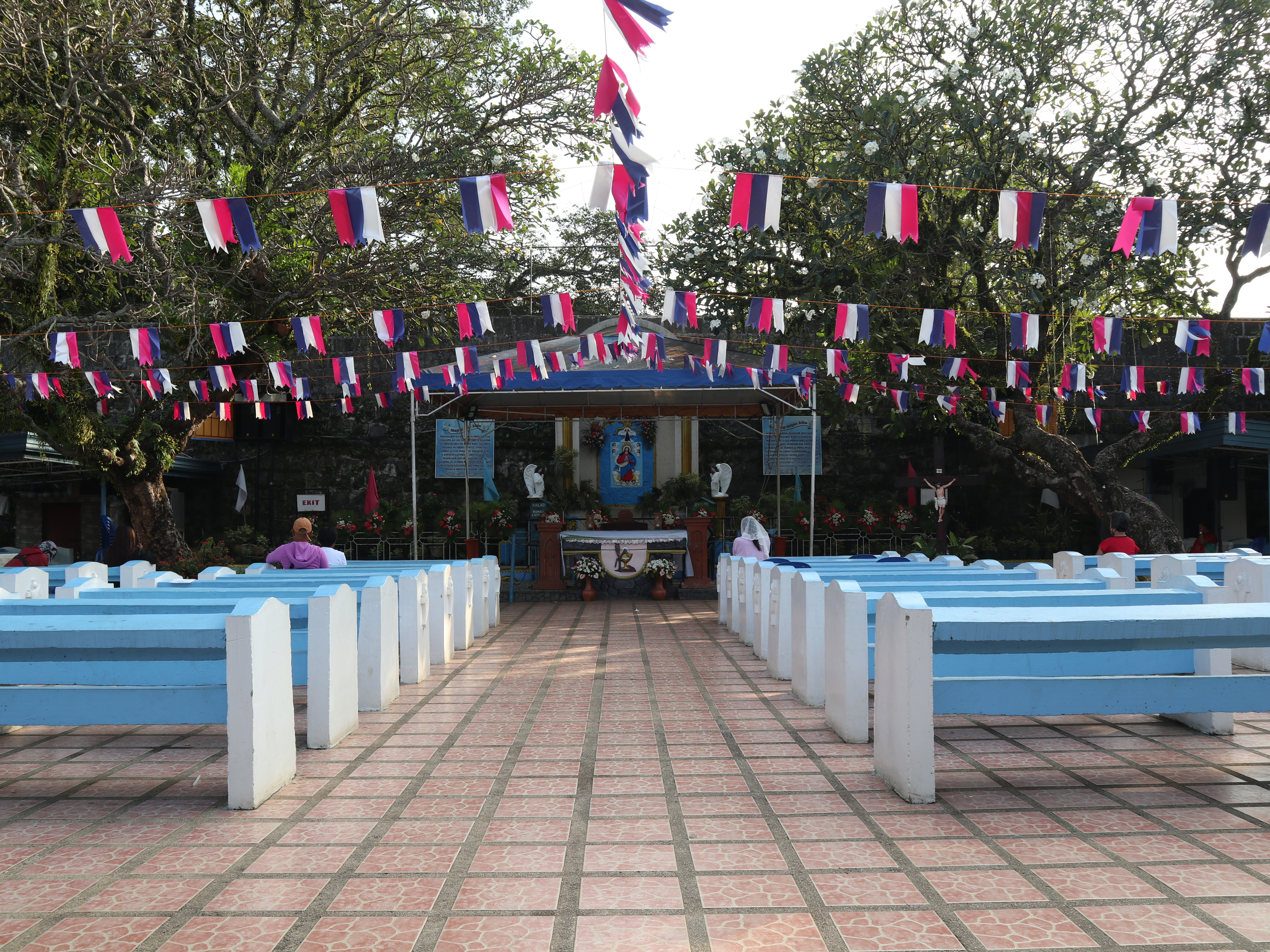
Archdiocesan Marian Shrine of the Birhen sa Cotta

During or after the fort's construction, the image of the Nuestra Señora de la Inmaculada Concepción y del Triunfo de la Cruz de Migpangi arrived at Misamis. Father Ducos then placed the fort under her patronage and enshrined the image in a chapel inside the walls. Outside the fort's southern wall is a bas relief of the Virgin, which is facing the bay. The bas relief's appearance is comparable to the painting of the Nuestra Señora de la Porteria (Our Lady of the Gate), venerated in Ávila, Spain.

The wooden image was kept in the fort until sometime between 1875 and 1884 when it was transferred to the nearby parish church (now the Metropolitan Cathedral of the Immaculate Conception) by Fray Jorge Carcabilla, the Spanish priest assigned to Misamis at the time, as both the chapel and the image were not properly taken care of.

Sometime in the late 1950s, a mentally ill man hacked to pieces the original, two centuries-old bas relief using a bolo. A devotee placed a plaster replica in its stead, which is still venerated today.

=== World War II ===
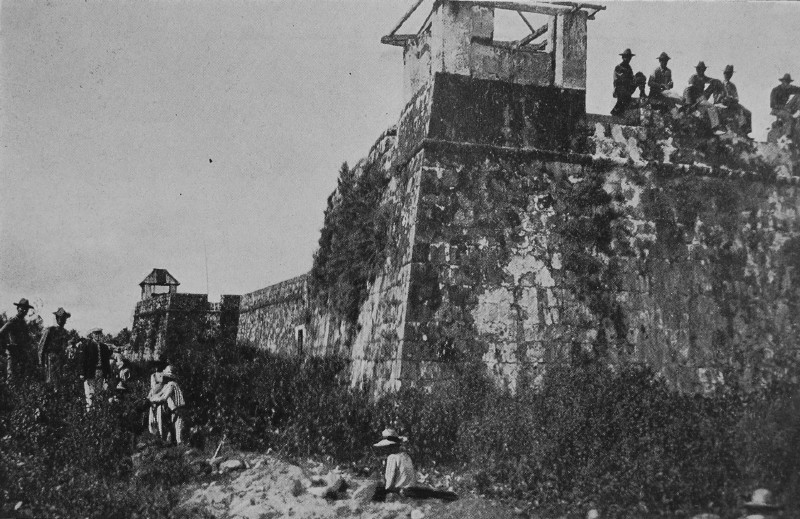
The fort during the 1900s

During World War II, Wendell Fertig made the fort the command headquarters of the growing guerrilla resistance to the Japanese occupaion in October 1942. However, his headquarters was abandoned on June 26, 1943 in the face of a large Japanese attack. The fort was captured and garrisoned by a contingent of Japanese troops who dug foxholes near and under the walls. This structural damage later led to the collapse of the southwest bastion in 1955 in a 7.4-magnitude earthquake.

== The fort today ==
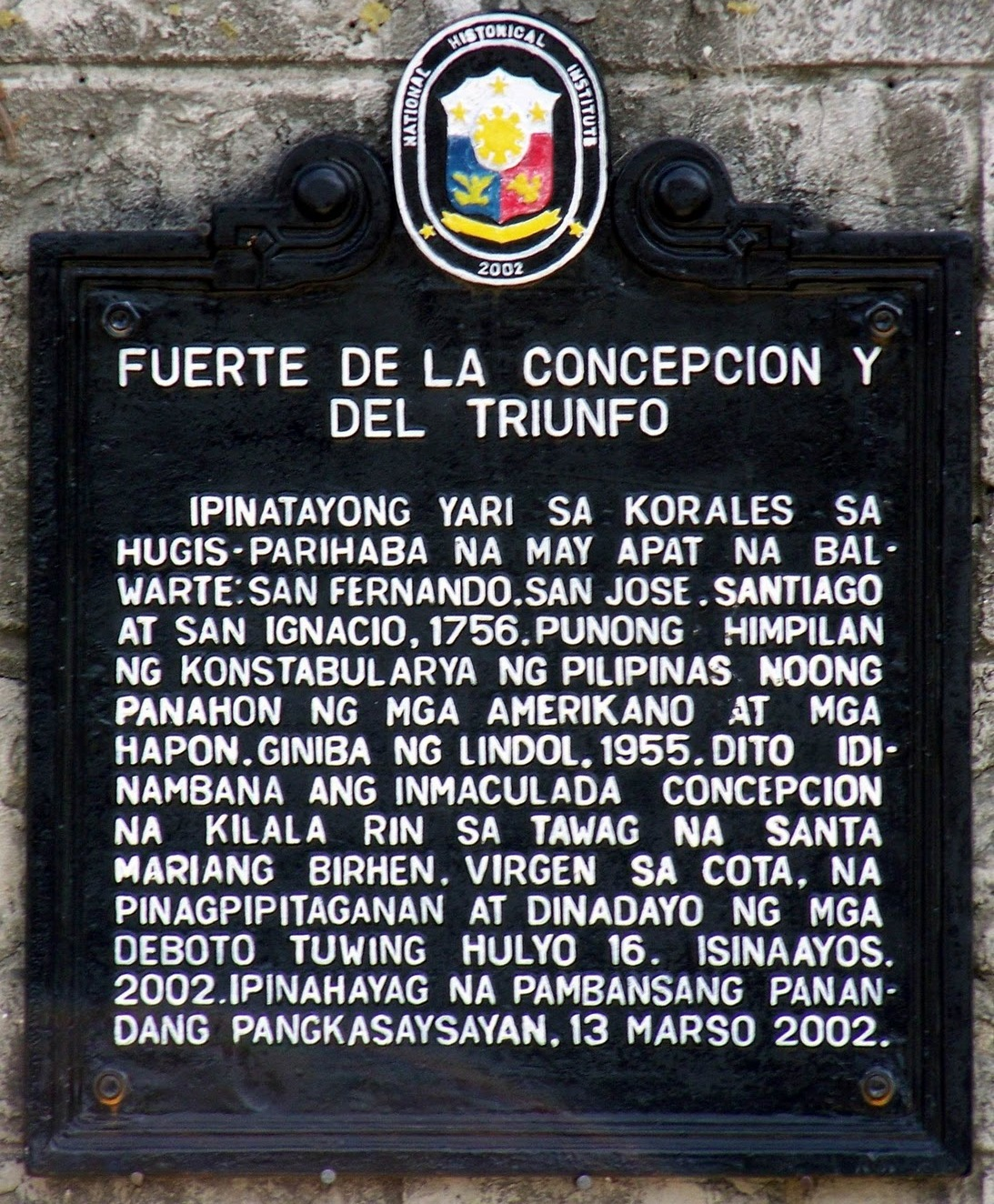
Marker of the National Historical Commission

Today, the fort is a tourist and pilgrimage destination and divided into three areas: Cotta Shrine, Cotta Garden (inside), and the Plaza de los Jesuitas (the seaside). The outdoor Cotta Shrine was formerly a gate with the icon, and has since been walled in. Inside the fort is the Cotta Garden, containing a small museum housing precious artifacts from the fort and the city. On the southeast bastion is a 9 meter (30 ft) concrete lighthouse built in around 1917. The lighthouse has a focal plane of 17 meters (55 ft) and it has two red flashes at ten-second intervals.

The fort was renovated and restored to its original design in 2002. The fort was declared a National Historical Landmark on March 13, 2002 by the National Historical Commission of the Philippines. On July 16, 2006, the Philippine Postal Corporation issued stamps of the fort in commemoration of its 250th anniversary.

== Gallery ==
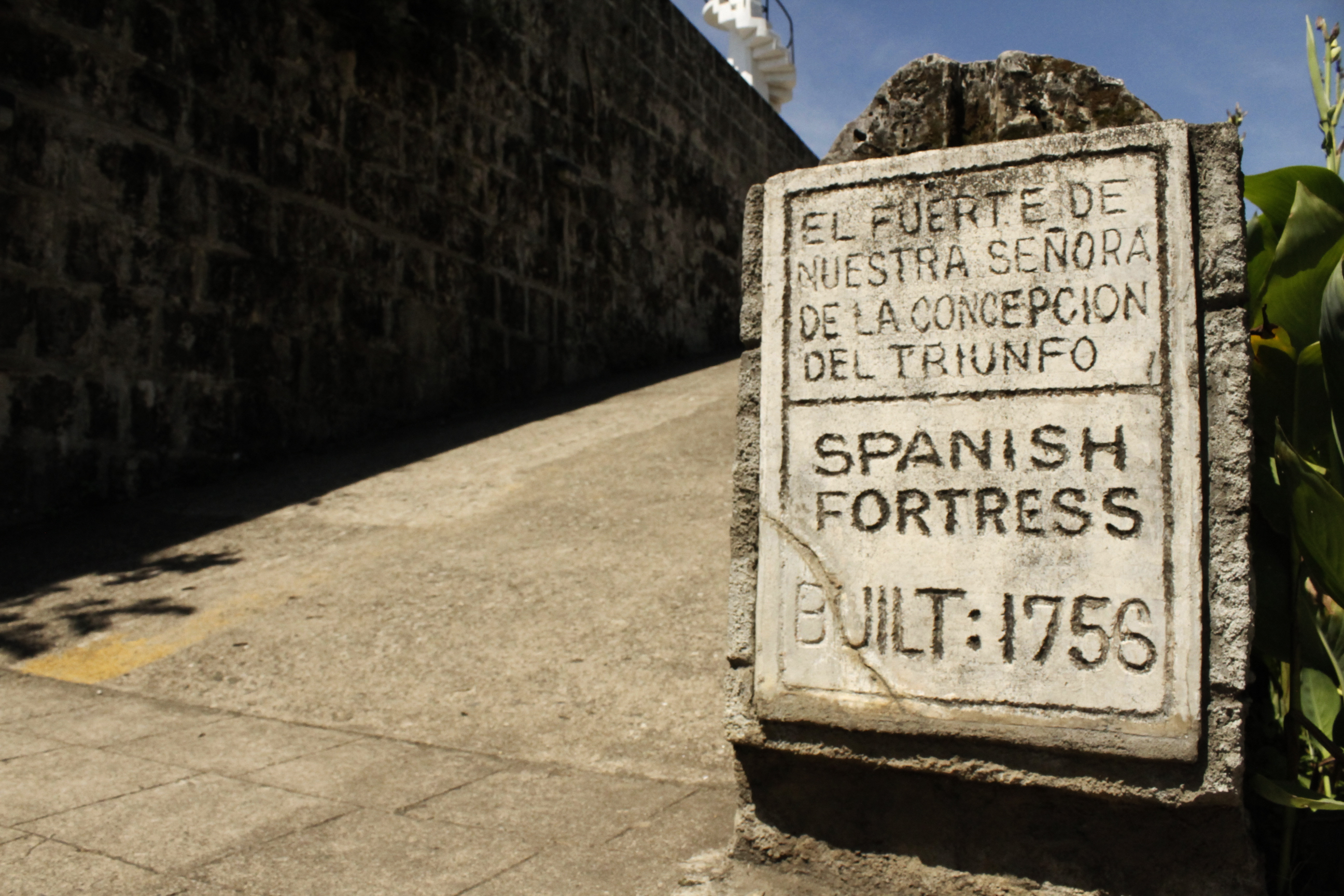
Marker with the name and date of the fort

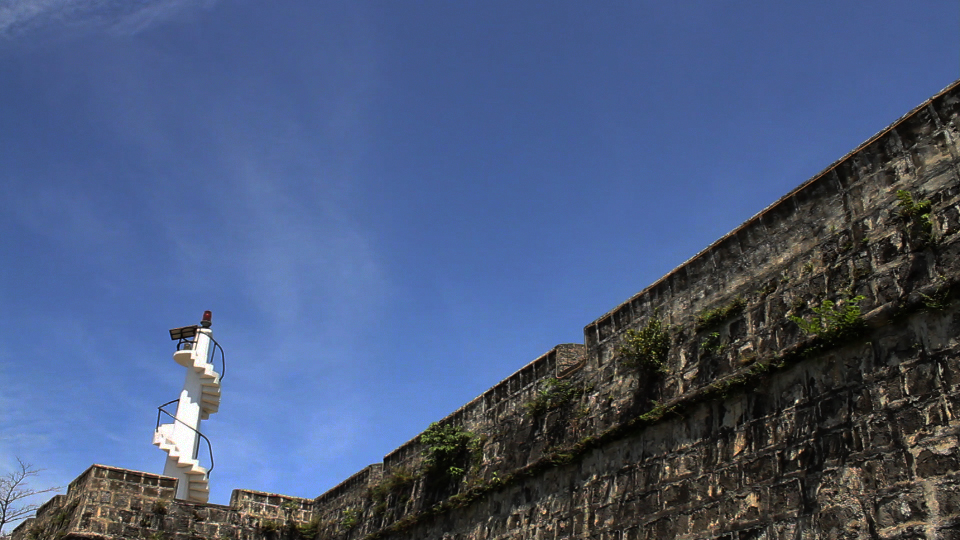
The lighthouse on the southeast bastion
